= 1994 WTA Tier I Series =

Women's professional tennis tour

Details
- Duration: January 31 – November 17
- Edition: 5th
- Tournaments: 8

Achievements (singles)
- Most titles: (Germany) Steffi Graf (3)
- Most finals: (Germany) Steffi Graf (4)

The WTA Tier I events are part of the elite tour for professional women's tennis organised by the WTA called the WTA Tour.

== Tournaments ==
Tournament	Country	Location	Surface	Date	Prize money
Tory Pan Pacific Open	Japan	Tokyo	Carpet (i)	Jan 31 – Feb 6	$750,000
Lipton Championships	United States	Key Biscayne	Hard	Mar 7 – 20	$1,000,000
Family Circle Cup	United States	Hilton Head Island	Clay	Mar 28 – Apr 3	$750,000
Italian Open	Italy	Rome	Clay	May 2 – 8	$750,000
German Open	Germany	Berlin	Clay	May 9 – 15	$750,000
Matinee LTD Canadian Open	Canada	Montreal	Hard	Aug 15 – 21	$750,000
European Indoors	Switzerland	Zürich	Carpet (i)	Oct 3 – 9	$750,000
Virginia Slims of Philadelphia	United States	Philadelphia	Carpet (i)	Nov 7 – 13	$750,000

== Results ==
* First-time champion

Tournament	Singles champions	Runners-up	Score	Doubles champions	Runners-up	Score
Tokyo Singles – Doubles	(Germany) Steffi Graf	(United States) Martina Navratilova	6–2, 6–4	(United States) Pam Shriver* (Australia) Elizabeth Smylie*	(Netherlands) Manon Bollegraf (United States) Martina Navratilova	6–3, 3–6, 7–6^{(7–3)}
Miami Singles – Doubles	(Germany) Steffi Graf	(Belarus) Natasha Zvereva	4–6, 6–1, 6–2	(United States) Gigi Fernández (Belarus) Natasha Zvereva	(United States) Patty Fendick (United States) Meredith McGrath	6–3, 6–1
Hilton Head Singles – Doubles	(Spain) Conchita Martínez	(Belarus) Natasha Zvereva	6–4, 6–0	(United States) Lori McNeil (Spain) Arantxa Sánchez Vicario	(United States) Gigi Fernández (Belarus) Natasha Zvereva	6–4, 4–1, ret.
Rome Singles – Doubles	(Spain) Conchita Martínez	(United States) Martina Navratilova	7–6^{(7–5)}, 6–4	(United States) Gigi Fernández (Belarus) Natasha Zvereva	(Argentina) Gabriela Sabatini (Netherlands) Brenda Schultz	6–1, 6–3
Berlin Singles – Doubles	(Germany) Steffi Graf	(Netherlands) Brenda Schultz	7–6^{(8–6)}, 6–4	(United States) Gigi Fernández (Belarus) Natasha Zvereva	(Czech Republic) Jana Novotná (Spain) Arantxa Sánchez Vicario	6–3, 7–6^{(7–2)}
Montréal Singles – Doubles	(Spain) Arantxa Sánchez Vicario	(Germany) Steffi Graf	7–5, 1–6, 7–6^{(7–4)}	(United States) Meredith McGrath*	(United States) Pam Shriver (Australia) Elizabeth Smylie	2–6, 6–2, 6–4
Montréal Singles – Doubles	(Spain) Arantxa Sánchez Vicario	(Germany) Steffi Graf	7–5, 1–6, 7–6^{(7–4)}	(Spain) Arantxa Sánchez Vicario	(United States) Pam Shriver (Australia) Elizabeth Smylie	2–6, 6–2, 6–4
Zürich Singles – Doubles	(Bulgaria) Magdalena Maleeva*	(Belarus) Natasha Zvereva	7–5, 3–6, 6–4	(Netherlands) Manon Bollegraf (United States) Martina Navratilova	(United States) Patty Fendick (United States) Meredith McGrath	7–6^{(7–3)}, 6–1
Philadelphia Singles – Doubles	(Germany) Anke Huber*	(France) Mary Pierce	6–0, 6–7^{(4–7)}, 7–5	(United States) Gigi Fernández (Belarus) Natasha Zvereva	(Argentina) Gabriela Sabatini (Netherlands) Brenda Schultz	4–6, 6–4, 6–2

== See also ==
- WTA Tier I events
- 1994 WTA Tour
- 1994 ATP Championship Series, Single Week
- 1994 ATP Tour
