= WTA 1000 Series singles records and statistics =

List of WTA 1000 records and statistics

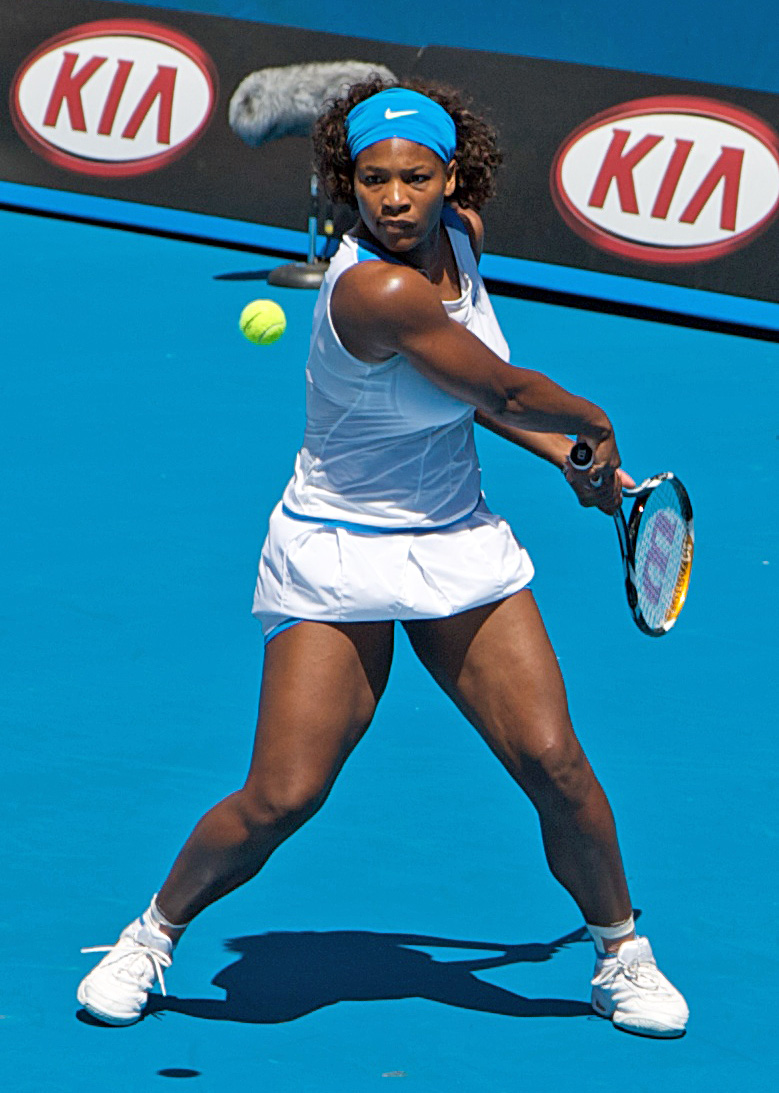
Serena Williams has won a record 23 WTA 1000 singles titles.

WTA 1000 is a category of tennis tournaments on the WTA Tour organized by the Women's Tennis Association.

The Series was initially called WTA Tier I which began in 1988 and lasted until 2008. Records before 1990 are excluded from this list. When the WTA Tour was established in 1990 there were initially six Tier I tournaments held annually in the first three years. The list thereafter expanded to eight events in 1993, nine in 1997 and ten in 2004, before being scaled back to nine for 2008.

In 2009 the WTA changed the tournament categories, so that the majority of Tier I and Tier II tournaments were in one category, Premier Tournaments, split into three categories: two of them being Premier Mandatory and Premier 5, comprising nine events being held with Wuhan, which replaced Tokyo in 2014, as the only exception.

WTA Premier Mandatory and Premier 5 tournaments merged into a single highest tier and it is implemented since the reorganization of the schedule in 2021.

In 2024 the WTA expanded to ten WTA 1000 tournaments, up from nine in 2023, with both Doha and Dubai becoming 1000 events every year instead of alternating. There are ten WTA 1000 tournaments: Doha, Dubai, Indian Wells, Miami, Madrid, Rome, Canada, Cincinnati, Beijing and Wuhan.

These tournaments offer 1000 ranking points for the winner.

Only three tournaments were held in 2020 due to the COVID-19 pandemic: Doha, Rome and Cincinnati.

Guadalajara replaced Wuhan and Beijing in 2022 due to the disappearance of Peng Shuai.

On 1 March 2022, the WTA announced that players from Belarus will not be allowed to compete under the name or flag of Belarus following the 2022 Russian invasion of Ukraine.

== Champions by year ==
- New tournaments underlined.

| Active tournaments | Defunct tournaments |

| Year | Tournaments (Note: All of the listed tournaments were held in chronological order with some exceptions: 1. Berlin was held before Rome between 1990–1999.; 2. Zürich was held before Moscow between 1997–2000.; 3. San Diego was held as the 6th event between 2004–2007.; 4. Canada preceded Cincinnati in 2009–2010.; 5. Rome was held before Madrid between 2009–2011.; 6. Rome was held as the last event in 2020.; 7. Indian Wells was held as the last event in 2021.) | | | | | | | | | |
|---|---|---|---|---|---|---|---|---|---|---|
| | Chicago | Tier III | Tier II | Miami | Hilton Head | Berlin | Rome | Canada | not an event | Tier II |
| 1990 | Navratilova (1/3) | Tier III | Tier II | Seles (1/9) | Navratilova (2/3) | Seles (3/9) | Seles (2/9) | Graf (1/15) | not an event | Tier II |
| | Boca Raton | Tier III | Tier II | Miami | Hilton Head | Berlin | Rome | Canada | Tier II | Tier II |
| 1991 | Sabatini (1/5) | Tier III | Tier II | Seles (4/9) | Sabatini (2/5) | Graf (2/15) | Sabatini (3/5) | Capriati (1/2) | Tier II | Tier II |
| 1992 | Graf (3/15) | Tier III | Tier II | Sánchez Vicario (1/6) | Sabatini (4/5) | Graf (4/15) | Sabatini (5/5) | Sánchez Vicario (2/6) | Tier II | Tier II |
| | Tokyo (Note: First event of Tokyo was played in Yokohama.) | Tier III | Tier II | Miami | Hilton Head | Berlin | Rome | Canada | Philadelphia | Zürich |
| 1993 | Navratilova (3/3) | Tier II | Tier II | Sánchez Vicario (3/6) | Graf (5/15) | Graf (6/15) | Martínez (1/9) | Graf (7/15) | Martínez (2/9) | Man. Maleeva (1/1) |
| 1994 | Graf (8/15) | Tier II | Tier II | Graf (9/15) | Martínez (3/9) | Graf (10/15) | Martínez (4/9) | Sánchez Vicario (4/6) | Huber (1/1) | Mag. Maleeva (1/2) |
| 1995 | Date (1/1) | Tier II | Tier II | Graf (11/15) | Martínez (5/9) | Sánchez Vicario (5/6) | Martínez (6/9) | Seles (5/9) | Graf (12/15) | Majoli (1/3) |
| | Tokyo | Tier II | Indian Wells | Miami | Hilton Head | Berlin | Rome | Canada | Tier II | Zürich |
| 1996 | Majoli (2/3) | Tier II | Graf (13/15) | Graf (14/15) | Sánchez Vicario (6/6) | Graf (15/15) | Martínez (7/9) | Seles (6/9) | Tier II | Novotná (1/2) |
| | Tokyo | Tier II | Indian Wells | Miami | Hilton Head | Berlin | Rome | Canada | Moscow | Zürich |
| 1997 | Hingis (1/17) | Tier II | Davenport (1/11) | Hingis (2/17) | Hingis (3/17) | Fernández (1/1) | Pierce (1/5) | Seles (7/9) | Novotná (2/2) | Davenport (2/11) |
| 1998 | Davenport (3/11) | Tier II | Hingis (4/17) | V. Williams (1/9) | Coetzer (1/1) | Martínez (8/9) | Hingis (5/17) | Seles (8/9) | Pierce (2/5) | Davenport (4/11) |
| 1999 | Hingis (6/17) | Tier II | S. Williams (1/23) | V. Williams (2/9) | Hingis (7/17) | Hingis (8/17) | V. Williams (3/9) | Hingis (9/17) | Tauziat (1/1) | V. Williams (4/9) |
| 2000 | Hingis (10/17) | Tier II | Davenport (5/11) | Hingis (11/17) | Pierce (3/5) | Martínez (9/9) | Seles (9/9) | Hingis (12/17) | Hingis (14/17) | Hingis (13/17) |
| | Tokyo | Tier II | Indian Wells | Miami | Charleston | Berlin | Rome | Canada | Moscow | Zürich |
| 2001 | Davenport (6/11) | Tier II | S. Williams (2/23) | V. Williams (5/9) | Capriati (2/2) | Mauresmo (1/6) | Dokic (1/2) | S. Williams (3/23) | Dokic (2/2) | Davenport (7/11) |
| 2002 | Hingis (15/17) | Tier II | Hantuchová (1/2) | S. Williams (4/23) | Majoli (3/3) | Henin (1/10) | S. Williams (5/23) | Mauresmo (2/6) | Mag. Maleeva (2/2) | Schnyder (1/1) |
| 2003 | Davenport (8/11) | Tier II | Clijsters (1/7) | S. Williams (6/23) | Henin (2/10) | Henin (3/10) | Clijsters (2/7) | Henin (4/10) | Myskina (1/2) | Henin (5/10) |
| | Tokyo | San Diego | Indian Wells | Miami | Charleston | Berlin | Rome | Canada | Moscow | Zürich |
| 2004 | Davenport (9/11) | Davenport (10/11) | Henin (6/10) | S. Williams (7/23) | V. Williams (6/9) | Mauresmo (3/6) | Mauresmo (4/6) | Mauresmo (5/6) | Myskina (2/2) | Molik (1/1) |
| 2005 | Sharapova (1/14) | Pierce (4/5) | Clijsters (3/7) | Clijsters (4/7) | Henin (7/10) | Henin (8/10) | Mauresmo (6/6) | Clijsters (5/7) | Pierce (5/5) | Davenport (11/11) |
| 2006 | Dementieva (1/3) | Sharapova (3/14) | Sharapova (2/14) | Kuznetsova (1/2) | Petrova (1/3) | Petrova (2/3) | Hingis (16/17) | Ivanovic (1/3) | Chakvetadze (1/1) | Sharapova (4/14) |
| 2007 | Hingis (17/17) | Sharapova (5/14) | Hantuchová (2/2) | S. Williams (8/23) | Janković (1/6) | Ivanovic (2/3) | Janković (2/6) | Henin (9/10) | Dementieva (2/3) | Henin (10/10) |
| | Doha (Note: In 2008, Doha replaced Tokyo, which was moved to replace Zürich as the last event.) | not an event | Indian Wells | Miami | Charleston | Berlin | Rome | Canada | Moscow | Tokyo |
| 2008 | Sharapova (6/14) | not an event | Ivanovic (3/3) | S. Williams (9/23) | S. Williams (10/23) | Safina (1/5) | Janković (3/6) | Safina (2/5) | Janković (4/6) | Safina (3/5) |
| | Doha | Dubai | Indian Wells | Miami | Madrid | Rome | Canada | Cincinnati | Tokyo | Beijing |
| 2009 | not an event | (United States) V. Williams (7/9) | (Russia) Zvonareva (1/1) | (Belarus) Azarenka (1/10) | (Russia) Safina (5/5) | (Russia) Safina (4/5) | (Russia) Dementieva (3/3) | (Serbia) Janković (5/6) | (Russia) Sharapova (7/14) | (Russia) Kuznetsova (2/2) |
| 2010 | not an event | (United States) V. Williams (8/9) | (Serbia) Janković (6/6) | (Belgium) Clijsters (6/7) | (France) Rezaï (1/1) | (Spain) Martínez Sánchez (1/1) | (Denmark) Wozniacki (1/6) | (Belgium) Clijsters (7/7) | (Denmark) Wozniacki (2/6) | (Denmark) Wozniacki (3/6) |
| 2011 | WTA Premier | (Denmark) Wozniacki (4/6) | (Denmark) Wozniacki (5/6) | (Belarus) Azarenka (2/10) | (Czech Republic) Kvitová (1/9) | (Russia) Sharapova (8/14) | (United States) S. Williams (11/23) | (Russia) Sharapova (9/14) | (Poland) Radwańska (1/5) | (Poland) Radwańska (2/5) |
| 2012 | (Belarus) Azarenka (3/10) | WTA Premier | (Belarus) Azarenka (4/10) | (Poland) Radwańska (3/5) | (United States) S. Williams (12/23) | (Russia) Sharapova (10/14) | (Czech Republic) Kvitová (2/9) | (China) Li (1/1) | (Russia) Petrova (3/3) | (Belarus) Azarenka (5/10) |
| 2013 | (Belarus) Azarenka (6/10) | WTA Premier | (Russia) Sharapova (11/14) | (United States) S. Williams (13/23) | (United States) S. Williams (14/23) | (United States) S. Williams (15/23) | (United States) S. Williams (16/23) | (Belarus) Azarenka (7/10) | (Czech Republic) Kvitová (3/9) | (United States) S. Williams (17/23) |
| | Doha | Dubai | Indian Wells | Miami | Madrid | Rome | Canada | Cincinnati | Wuhan | Beijing |
| 2014 | (Romania) Halep (1/9) | WTA Premier | (Italy) Pennetta (1/1) | (United States) S. Williams (18/23) | (Russia) Sharapova (12/14) | (United States) S. Williams (19/23) | (Poland) Radwańska (4/5) | (United States) S. Williams (20/23) | (Czech Republic) Kvitová (4/9) | (Russia) Sharapova (13/14) |
| 2015 | WTA Premier | (Romania) Halep (2/9) | (Romania) Halep (3/9) | (United States) S. Williams (21/23) | (Czech Republic) Kvitová (5/9) | (Russia) Sharapova (14/14) | (Switzerland) Bencic (1/2) | (United States) S. Williams (22/23) | (United States) V. Williams (9/9) | (Spain) Muguruza (1/3) |
| 2016 | (Spain) Suárez Navarro (1/1) | WTA Premier | (Belarus) Azarenka (8/10) | (Belarus) Azarenka (9/10) | (Romania) Halep (4/9) | (United States) S. Williams (23/23) | (Romania) Halep (5/9) | (Czech Republic) Plíšková (1/2) | (Czech Republic) Kvitová (6/9) | (Poland) Radwańska (5/5) |
| 2017 | WTA Premier | (Ukraine) Svitolina (1/4) | (Russia) Vesnina (1/1) | (United Kingdom) Konta (1/1) | (Romania) Halep (6/9) | (Ukraine) Svitolina (2/4) | (Ukraine) Svitolina (3/4) | (Spain) Muguruza (2/3) | (France) Garcia (1/3) | (France) Garcia (2/3) |
| 2018 | (Czech Republic) Kvitová (7/9) | WTA Premier | (Japan) Osaka (1/2) | (United States) Stephens (1/1) | (Czech Republic) Kvitová (8/9) | (Ukraine) Svitolina (4/4) | (Romania) Halep (7/9) | (Netherlands) Bertens (1/2) | (Belarus) Sabalenka (1/5) | (Denmark) Wozniacki (6/6) |
| 2019 | WTA Premier | (Switzerland) Bencic (2/2) | (Canada) Andreescu (1/2) | (Australia) Barty (1/3) | (Netherlands) Bertens (2/2) | (Czech Republic) Plíšková (2/2) | (Canada) Andreescu (2/2) | (United States) Keys (1/1) | (Belarus) Sabalenka (2/5) | (Japan) Osaka (2/2) |
| 2020 (Note: In 2020, Cincinnati was held in New York City.) | (Belarus) Sabalenka (3/5) | WTA Premier | not held (Note: Cancelled due to the COVID-19 pandemic.) | | | (Romania) Halep (8/9) | not held | (Belarus) Azarenka (10/10) | not held | |
| 2021 | WTA 500 | (Spain) Muguruza (3/3) | (Spain) Badosa (1/1) | (Australia) Barty (2/3) | (Belarus) Sabalenka (4/5) | (Poland) Świątek (1/6) | (Italy) Giorgi (1/1) | (Australia) Barty (3/3) | not held | |
| | Doha | Dubai | Indian Wells | Miami | Madrid | Rome | Canada | Cincinnati | Guadalajara | Beijing |
| 2022 | (Poland) Świątek (2/6) | WTA 500 | (Poland) Świątek (3/6) | (Poland) Świątek (4/6) | (Tunisia) Jabeur (1/1) | (Poland) Świątek (5/6) | (Romania) Halep (9/9) | (France) Garcia (3/3) | (United States) Pegula (1/2) | not held |
| 2023 | WTA 500 | (Czech Republic) Krejčíková (1/1) | (Kazakhstan) Rybakina (1/2) | (Czech Republic) Kvitová (9/9) | Sabalenka (5/5) | (Kazakhstan) Rybakina (2/2) | (United States) Pegula (2/2) | (United States) Gauff (1/1) | (Greece) Sakkari (1/1) | (Poland) Świątek (6/6) |
| | Doha | Dubai | Indian Wells | Miami | Madrid | Rome | Canada | Cincinnati | Beijing | Wuhan |
| 2024 | Świątek (7/12) | Paolini (1/2) | Świątek (8/12) | Collins (1/1) | Świątek (9/12) | Świątek (10/12) | Pegula (3/4) | Sabalenka (6/11) | Gauff (2/4) | Sabalenka (7/11) |
| 2025 | Anisimova (1/2) | Andreeva (1/2) | Andreeva (2/2) | Sabalenka (8/11) | Sabalenka (9/11) | Paolini (2/2) | Mboko (1/1) | Świątek (11/12) | Anisimova (2/2) | Gauff (3/4) |
| 2026 | Muchová (1/1) | Pegula (4/4) | Sabalenka (10/11) | Sabalenka (11/11) | Kostyuk (1/1) | Svitolina (5/5) | Świątek (12/12) | Gauff (4/4) | Zheng (1/1) | Chwalińska (1/1) |

== Title leaders ==
- **CA** (Canadian Open)
- **CH** (Charleston Open)
- **CI** (Cincinnati Open)
- **CN** (China Open)
- **DU** (Dubai Championship)
- **FL** (Virginia Slims of Florida)
- **GE** (German Open)
- **IT** (Italian Open)
- **IW** (Indian Wells Open)
- **KC** (Kremlin Cup)
- **MA** (Madrid Open)
- **MI** (Miami Open)
- **PH** (Virginia Slims of Philadelphia)
- **PP** (Pan Pacific Open)
- **QA** (Qatar Open)
- **SD** (San Diego Open)
- **WU** (Wuhan Open)
- **ZU** (Zurich Open)

| Active events | Defunct events |

* Active players and most titles won per tournament are denoted in bold.

Title leaders
| Titles | Player | QA | DU | IW | MI | MA | IT | CA | CI | WU | CN | FL | CH | GE | SD | PH | KC | PP | ZU | Years |
|---|---|---|---|---|---|---|---|---|---|---|---|---|---|---|---|---|---|---|---|---|
| 23 | Serena Williams | - | - | **2*** | **8*** | 2 | **4*** | 3 | **2*** | - | 1 | - | 1 | - | - | - | - | - | - | 1999–2016 |
| 17 | Martina Hingis | - | - | 1 | 2 | - | 2 | 2 | - | - | - | - | **2*** | 1 | - | - | 1 | **5*** | 1 | 1997–2007 |
| 15 | Steffi Graf | - | - | 1 | 3 | - | - | 2 | - | - | - | **1*** | 1 | **5*** | - | **1*** | - | 1 | - | 1990–1996 |
| 14 | Maria Sharapova | 1 | - | **2*** | - | 1 | 3 | - | 1 | - | 1 | - | - | - | **2*** | - | - | 2 | 1 | 2005–2015 |
| 12 | **Iga Świątek*** | **2*** | - | **2*** | 1 | 1 | 3 | 1 | 1 | - | 1 | - | - | - | - | - | - | - | - | 2021–2026 |
| 11 | Lindsay Davenport | - | - | **2*** | - | - | - | - | - | - | - | - | - | - | 1 | - | - | 4 | **4*** | 1997–2005 |
| 11 | **Aryna Sabalenka*** | 1 | - | 1 | 2 | **3*** | - | - | 1 | **3*** | - | - | - | - | - | - | - | - | - | 2018–2026 |
| 10 | Justine Henin | - | - | 1 | - | - | - | 2 | - | - | - | - | **2*** | 3 | - | - | - | - | 2 | 2002–2007 |
| 10 | **Victoria Azarenka*** | **2*** | - | **2*** | 3 | - | - | - | **2*** | - | 1 | - | - | - | - | - | - | - | - | 2009–2020 |
| 9 | Conchita Martínez | - | - | - | - | - | **4*** | - | - | - | - | - | **2*** | 2 | - | **1*** | - | - | - | 1993–2000 |
| 9 | Monica Seles | - | - | - | 2 | - | 2 | **4*** | - | - | - | - | - | 1 | - | - | - | - | - | 1990–2000 |
| 9 | **Venus Williams*** | - | **2*** | - | 3 | - | 1 | - | - | 1 | - | - | 1 | - | - | - | - | - | 1 | 1998–2015 |
| 9 | Simona Halep | 1 | 1 | 1 | - | 2 | 1 | 3 | - | - | - | - | - | - | - | - | - | - | - | 2014–2022 |
| 9 | Petra Kvitová | 1 | - | - | 1 | **3*** | - | 1 | - | 2 | - | - | - | - | - | - | - | 1 | - | 2011–2023 |
| 7 | Kim Clijsters | - | - | **2*** | 2 | - | 1 | 1 | 1 | - | - | - | - | - | - | - | - | - | - | 2003–2010 |
| 6 | Arantxa Sánchez Vicario | - | - | - | 2 | - | 1 | 2 | - | - | - | - | 1 | - | - | - | - | - | - | 1992–1996 |
| 6 | Amélie Mauresmo | - | - | - | - | - | 2 | 2 | - | - | - | - | - | 2 | - | - | - | - | - | 2001–2005 |
| 6 | Jelena Janković | - | - | 1 | - | - | 2 | - | 1 | - | - | - | 1 | - | - | - | 1 | - | - | 2007–2010 |
| 6 | **Caroline Wozniacki*** | - | 1 | 1 | - | - | - | 1 | - | - | **2*** | - | - | - | - | - | - | 1 | - | 2010–2018 |
| 5 | Gabriela Sabatini | - | - | - | - | - | 2 | - | - | - | - | **1*** | **2*** | - | - | - | - | - | - | 1991–1992 |
| 5 | Mary Pierce | - | - | - | - | - | 1 | - | - | - | - | - | 1 | - | 1 | - | **2*** | - | - | 1997–2005 |
| 5 | Dinara Safina | - | - | - | - | 1 | 1 | 1 | - | - | - | - | - | 1 | - | - | - | 1 | - | 2008–2009 |
| 5 | Agnieszka Radwańska | - | - | - | 1 | - | - | 1 | - | - | **2*** | - | - | - | - | - | - | 1 | - | 2011–2016 |
| 5 | **Elina Svitolina*** | - | 1 | - | - | - | 3 | 1 | - | - | - | - | - | - | - | - | - | - | - | 2017–2026 |
| **Titles** | **Player** | **QA** | **DU** | **IW** | **MI** | **MA** | **IT** | **CA** | **CI** | **WU** | **CN** | **FL** | **CH** | **GE** | **SD** | **PH** | **KC** | **PP** | **ZU** | **Years** |

- Players with 5+ titles.
- 78 champions in 307 events as of **2026 Canada**.

== Career totals ==
- Active players in **bold**.

Singles
| No. | Titles |
|---|---|
| 23 | (United States) Serena Williams |
| 17 | (Switzerland) Martina Hingis |
| 15 | (Germany) Steffi Graf |
| 14 | (Russia) Maria Sharapova |
| 12 | (Poland) **Iga Świątek** |
| 11 | (United States) Lindsay Davenport |
| 11 | (Belarus) **Aryna Sabalenka** |
| 10 | (Belgium) Justine Henin |
| 10 | (Belarus) **Victoria Azarenka** |
| 9 | (Spain) Conchita Martínez |
| 9 | (Socialist Federal Republic of Yugoslavia) / (United States) Monica Seles |
| 9 | (United States) **Venus Williams** |
| 9 | (Romania) Simona Halep |
| 9 | (Czech Republic) Petra Kvitová |

| No. | Finals |
|---|---|
| 33 | Serena Williams |
| 27 | Martina Hingis |
| 25 | Maria Sharapova |
| 22 | Steffi Graf |
| 21 | Lindsay Davenport |
| 18 | Monica Seles |
| 18 | Simona Halep |
| 15 | **Venus Williams** |
| 15 | (Belarus) Victoria Azarenka |
| 15 | **Aryna Sabalenka** |
| 14 | Conchita Martínez |
| 14 | Justine Henin |
| 14 | **Iga Świątek** |

| No. | Semifinals |
|---|---|
| 43 | Serena Williams |
| 38 | Martina Hingis |
| 37 | Maria Sharapova |
| 29 | Simona Halep |
| 28 | Conchita Martínez |
| 28 | **Venus Williams** |
| 26 | Steffi Graf |
| 26 | Lindsay Davenport |
| 26 | (Belarus) Victoria Azarenka |
| 25 | Monica Seles |
| 25 | **Iga Świątek** |

| No. | Quarterfinals |
|---|---|
| 59 | Serena Williams |
| 47 | Martina Hingis |
| 47 | Maria Sharapova |
| 47 | **Venus Williams** |
| 46 | Agnieszka Radwańska |
| 44 | Conchita Martínez |
| 42 | Svetlana Kuznetsova |
| 41 | (Belarus) Victoria Azarenka |
| 40 | Lindsay Davenport |
| 39 | Simona Halep |

| No. | Matches Played |
|---|---|
| 327 | Svetlana Kuznetsova |
| 325 | (Belarus) Victoria Azarenka |
| 313 | Serena Williams |
| 307 | **Venus Williams** |
| 295 | Caroline Wozniacki |
| 290 | Maria Sharapova |
| 290 | Jelena Janković |
| 282 | Agnieszka Radwańska |
| 281 | Petra Kvitová |
| 257 | Simona Halep |

| No. | Match wins |
|---|---|
| 263 | Serena Williams |
| 231 | (Belarus) Victoria Azarenka |
| 220 | Maria Sharapova |
| 214 | Svetlana Kuznetsova |
| 214 | **Venus Williams** |
| 199 | Agnieszka Radwańska |
| 195 | Caroline Wozniacki |
| 189 | Martina Hingis |
| 186 | Simona Halep |
| 181 | Petra Kvitová |

| % | W–L | Match record |
|---|---|---|
| 88.4 | 130–17 | Steffi Graf |
| 84.0 | 263–50 | Serena Williams |
| 81.6 | 111–25 | Justine Henin |
| 81.1 | 189–44 | Martina Hingis |
| 80.5 | 120–29 | Monica Seles |
| 80.3 | 151–37 | **Iga Swiatek** |
| 77.6 | 152–44 | Lindsay Davenport |
| 75.9 | 220–70 | Maria Sharapova |
| 75.7 | 109–35 | Gabriela Sabatini |
| 74.3 | 156–54 | (Belarus) **Aryna Sabalenka** |
*minimum 100 wins

- Statistics correct as of **2026 Rome**. To avoid double counting, they should be updated at the conclusion of a tournament or when the player's participation has ended.

== Season records ==
Most titles
| No. | Player | Year | |
|---|---|---|---|
| 5 | Martina Hingis | 2000 | |
| 5 | Serena Williams | 2013 | |
| 4 | Iga Świątek | 2 | 2022, 24 |
| 4 | Martina Hingis | 1999 | |
| 3 | Steffi Graf | 3 | 1993–94, 96 |
| 3 | Monica Seles | 1990 | |
| 3 | Gabriela Sabatini | 1991 | |
| 3 | Martina Hingis | 1997 | |
| 3 | Amélie Mauresmo | 2004 | |
| 3 | Kim Clijsters | 2005 | |
| 3 | Maria Sharapova | 2006 | |
| 3 | Dinara Safina | 2008 | |
| 3 | Caroline Wozniacki | 2010 | |
| 3 | Victoria Azarenka | 2012 | |
| 3 | Elina Svitolina | 2017 | |

Most finals
| No. | Player | Year | |
|---|---|---|---|
| 7 | Serena Williams | 2013 | |
| 6 | Martina Hingis | 2000 | |
| 5 | Steffi Graf | 1993 | |
| 5 | Martina Hingis | 1999 | |
| 4 | Maria Sharapova | 2 | 2006, 12 |
| 4 | Simona Halep | 2 | 2015, 17 |
| 4 | Iga Świątek | 2 | 2022, 24 |
| 4 | Gabriela Sabatini | 1991 | |
| 4 | Steffi Graf | 1994 | |
| 4 | Jennifer Capriati | 2001 | |
| 4 | Justine Henin | 2003 | |
| 4 | Victoria Azarenka | 2012 | |
| 4 | Aryna Sabalenka | 2024 | |

== Consecutive records ==
| No. | Consecutive titles | Years |
|---|---|---|
| 5 | Caroline Wozniacki | 2010–11 |
| 4 | Serena Williams | 2013 |
| 3 | Martina Hingis | 2000 |
| 3 | Iga Świątek | 2022 |

| No. | Consecutive finals | Years |
|---|---|---|
| 5 | Caroline Wozniacki | 2010–11 |
| 5 | Serena Williams | 2013 |
| 4 | Gabriela Sabatini | 1991 |
| 4 | Martina Hingis | 2000–01 |
| 4 | Lindsay Davenport | 2002–03 |

== Tournament records ==
=== Most titles per tournament ===
Active
| Tournament | No. | Player | Years |
|---|---|---|---|
| Doha | 2 | Victoria Azarenka | 2012–13 |
| Doha | 2 | Iga Świątek | 2022–24 |
| Dubai | 2 | Venus Williams | 2009–10 |
| Indian Wells (Note: Multiple winners of Indian Wells before 1996 are not included.) | 2 | Lindsay Davenport | 1997–2000 |
| Indian Wells | 2 | Serena Williams | 1999–2001 |
| Indian Wells | 2 | Kim Clijsters | 2003–05 |
| Indian Wells | 2 | Daniela Hantuchová | 2002–07 |
| Indian Wells | 2 | Maria Sharapova | 2006–13 |
| Indian Wells | 2 | Victoria Azarenka | 2012–16 |
| Indian Wells | 2 | Iga Świątek | 2022–24 |
| Miami | 8 | Serena Williams | 2002–15 |
| Madrid | 3 | Petra Kvitová | 2011–18 |
| Madrid | 3 | Aryna Sabalenka | 2021–25 |
| Rome | 4 | Conchita Martínez | 1993–96 |
| Rome | 4 | Serena Williams | 2002–16 |
| Canada | 4 | Monica Seles | 1995–98 |
| Cincinnati | 2 | Serena Williams | 2014–15 |
| Cincinnati | 2 | Victoria Azarenka | 2013–20 |
| Cincinnati | 2 | Coco Gauff | 2023–26 |
| Beijing | 2 | Agnieszka Radwańska | 2011–16 |
| Beijing | 2 | Caroline Wozniacki | 2010–18 |
| Wuhan | 3 | Aryna Sabalenka | 2018–24 |

Discontinued
| Tournament | No. | Player | Years |
|---|---|---|---|
| Chicago (Note: Chicago was held only once.) | 1 | Martina Navratilova | 1990 |
| Boca Raton | 1 | Gabriela Sabatini | 1991 |
| Boca Raton | 1 | Steffi Graf | 1992 |
| Philadelphia | 1 | Conchita Martínez | 1993 |
| Philadelphia | 1 | Anke Huber | 1994 |
| Philadelphia | 1 | Steffi Graf | 1995 |
| Berlin | 5 | Steffi Graf | 1991–96 |
| Charleston | 2 | Gabriela Sabatini | 1991–92 |
| Charleston | 2 | Conchita Martínez | 1994–95 |
| Charleston | 2 | Martina Hingis | 1997–99 |
| Charleston | 2 | Justine Henin | 2003–05 |
| Zürich | 4 | Lindsay Davenport | 1997–2005 |
| Moscow | 2 | Mary Pierce | 1998–2005 |
| Moscow | 2 | Anastasia Myskina | 2003–04 |
| Tokyo | 5 | Martina Hingis | 1997–2007 |
| San Diego | 2 | Maria Sharapova | 2006–07 |
| Guadalajara | 1 | Jessica Pegula | 2022 |
| Guadalajara | 1 | Maria Sakkari | 2023 |

=== Tournaments won with no sets dropped ===
| No. | Player | Events |
|---|---|---|
| 7 | Martina Hingis | Indian Wells (1998), Charleston (1999), Berlin (1999), Canada (1999), Miami (2000), Tokyo (2000, 2007) |
| 6 | Monica Seles | Miami (1990), Berlin (1990), Rome (1990), Canada (1995, 1996, 1997) |
| 6 | Iga Świątek | Miami (2022), Rome (2022, 2024), Doha (2024), Indian Wells (2024), Cincinnati (2025) |
| 5 | Lindsay Davenport | Zürich (1997, 1998), Tokyo (1998, 2004), San Diego (2004) |
| 5 | Serena Williams | Miami (2002), Canada (2013), Beijing (2013), Rome (2013, 2016) |
| 4 | Gabriela Sabatini | Boca Raton (1991), Rome (1991, 1992), Charleston (1992) |
| 4 | Steffi Graf | Charleston (1993), Tokyo (1994), Miami (1995, 1996) |
| 3 | Conchita Martínez | Rome (1993, 1994), Berlin (2000) |
| 3 | Justine Henin | Zürich (2003), Indian Wells (2004), Canada (2007) |
| 3 | Maria Sharapova | San Diego (2006), Indian Wells (2006, 2013) |
| 3 | Victoria Azarenka | Doha (2012), Beijing (2012), Miami (2016) |
| 2 | Martina Navratilova | Chicago (1990), Charleston (1990) |
| 2 | Mary Pierce | Charleston (2000), San Diego (2005) |
| 2 | Kim Clijsters | Miami (2005), Canada (2005) |
| 2 | Caroline Wozniacki | Dubai (2011), Beijing (2018) |
| 2 | Agnieszka Radwańska | Miami (2012), Beijing (2016) |
| 2 | Aryna Sabalenka | Cincinnati (2024), Miami (2025) |
| 1 | Jennifer Capriati | Canada (1991) |
| 1 | Arantxa Sánchez Vicario | Miami (1992) |
| 1 | Manuela Maleeva | Zürich (1993) |
| 1 | Jana Novotná | Moscow (1997) |
| 1 | Amélie Mauresmo | Canada (2002) |
| 1 | Anastasia Myskina | Moscow (2003) |
| 1 | Jelena Janković | Rome (2007) |
| 1 | Vera Zvonareva | Indian Wells (2009) |
| 1 | Venus Williams | Dubai (2010) |
| 1 | Kiki Bertens | Madrid (2019) |
| 1 | Ashleigh Barty | Cincinnati (2021) |
| 1 | Maria Sakkari | Guadalajara (2023) |
| 1 | Coco Gauff | Wuhan (2025) |

=== Different titles won ===
Singles
| No. | Player | Events |
|---|---|---|
| 9 | Martina Hingis (Note: Hingis is the only player to win all nine active Tier I events during 1997–2000.) | Indian Wells (hard), Miami (hard), Berlin (clay), Rome (clay), Charleston (green clay), Canada (hard), Moscow (carpet indoors), Tokyo (carpet indoors), Zurich (carpet indoors) |
| 9 | Maria Sharapova | Indian Wells (hard), Miami (hard), Madrid (clay), Rome (clay), Cincinnati (hard), Beijing (hard), San Diego (hard), Tokyo (carpet indoors), Zurich (carpet indoors) |
| 8 | Steffi Graf | Indian Wells (hard), Miami (hard), Charleston (green clay), Berlin (clay), Canada (hard), Florida (hard), Philadelphia (carpet indoors), Tokyo (carpet indoors) |
| 8 | Serena Williams | Indian Wells (hard), Miami (hard), Madrid (clay), Rome (clay), Cincinnati (hard), Canada (hard), Beijing (hard), Charleston (green clay) |
| 8 | Iga Świątek | Doha (hard), Indian Wells (hard), Miami (hard), Madrid (clay), Rome (clay), Cincinnati (hard), Beijing (hard), Canada (hard) |

== Calendar title combinations ==
- **Back-to-back** tournament titles.
- Currently active combinations in **bold.**

=== Four consecutive ===
- Serena Williams won a season-record of four consecutive titles by winning the **Miami–Madrid–Rome-Canada** titles in 2013.

=== Three consecutive ===
| Combination | Winner | Year |
|---|---|---|
| Canada–Moscow—Zurich "Season end triple" | Martina Hingis | 2000 |
| Doha–Indian Wells—Miami "Season first triple" (Note: Until 2023, Doha and Dubai alternated yearly as 1000 events before the format expanded to ten events with both events being held each year from 2024 onwards.) | Iga Świątek | 2022 |

=== Two consecutive ===
| Combination | Winner | Year(s) |
|---|---|---|
| Indian Wells—Miami' "Sunshine double" | Steffi Graf | 1996 |
| Indian Wells—Miami' "Sunshine double" | Kim Clijsters | 2005 |
| Indian Wells—Miami' "Sunshine double" | Victoria Azarenka | 2016 |
| Indian Wells—Miami' "Sunshine double" | Iga Świątek | 2022 |
| Indian Wells—Miami' "Sunshine double" | Aryna Sabalenka | 2026 |
| Madrid—Rome "Clay double" | Dinara Safina | 2009 |
| Madrid—Rome "Clay double" | Serena Williams | 2013 |
| Madrid—Rome "Clay double" | Iga Świątek | 2024 |
| **Wuhan**/Moscow—**Beijing**/Zurich "Fall double" | Martina Hingis | 2000 |
| **Wuhan**/Moscow—**Beijing**/Zurich "Fall double" | Caroline Garcia | 2017 |

== Titles won by decade ==
as of 2026 Cincinnati.

| === 1990s === : 15 / Graf; 9 / Hingis; 8 / Martínez, Seles; 6 / Sánchez Vicario; 5 / Sabatini; 4 / Davenport, V. Williams; 3 / Navratilova; 2 / Majoli, Novotná, Pierce; 1 / Capriati, Coetzer, Date, Fernández, Huber, Mag. Maleeva, Man. Maleeva, Tauziat, S. Williams; === 2000s === : 10 / Henin; 9 / S. Williams; 8 / Hingis; 7 / Davenport, Sharapova; 6 / Mauresmo; 5 / Clijsters, Janković, Safina; 3 / Dementieva, Ivanovic, Pierce, V. Williams; 2 / Dokic, Hantuchová, Kuznetsova, Myskina, Petrova; 1 / Azarenka, Capriati, Chakvetadze, Mag. Maleeva, Majoli, Martinez, Molik, Schnyder, Seles, Zvonareva | === 2010s === : 13 / S. Williams; 8 / Azarenka, Kvitová; 7 / Halep, Sharapova; 6 / Wozniacki; 5 / Radwańska; 4 / Svitolina; 2 / Andreescu, Bencic, Bertens, Clijsters, Garcia, Muguruza, Osaka, Plíšková, Sabalenka, V. Williams; 1 / Barty, Janković, Keys, Konta, Li, Martínez Sánchez, Pennetta, Petrova, Rezaï, Stephens, Suárez Navarro, Vesnina; === 2020s === : 12 / Świątek; 9 / Sabalenka; 4 / Gauff, Pegula; 2 / Andreeva, Anisimova, Barty, Halep, Paolini, Rybakina; 1 / Azarenka, Badosa, Chwalińska, Collins, Garcia, Giorgi, Jabeur, Kostyuk, Krejčíková, Kvitová, Mboko, Muchová, Muguruza, Sakkari, Svitolina, Zheng |

== Titles won by country ==
as of 2026 Wuhan.

| 67 | United States (13 players) |

| 32 | Russia (9 players) (Note: Not including Mirra Andreeva's titles in 2025) |

| 21 | Spain (6 players), Switzerland (4 players) |

| 18 | Poland (3 players) |

| 17 | Belgium (2 players) |

| 16 | France (5 players), Germany (2 players) |

| 15 | Czech Republic (5 players), Yugoslavia / Serbia (4 players) |

| 14 | Belarus (2 players) (Note: Not including Aryna Sabalenka's titles in 2023–26) |

| 9 | Romania (1 player) |

| 6 | Denmark (1 player), Ukraine (2 players) |

| 5 | Argentina (1 player) |

| 4 | Australia (2 players), Italy (3 players) |

| 3 | Canada (2 players), Croatia (3 players), Japan (2 players) |

| 2 | Bulgaria (1 player), China (2 player), Kazakhstan (1 player), Netherlands (1 player), Slovakia (1 player) |

| 1 | Great Britain, Greece, South Africa, Tunisia |

== See also ==
WTA Tour

- WTA 1000
- WTA 1000 Series doubles records and statistics
- WTA Premier Mandatory and Premier 5
- WTA Tier I tournaments

ATP Tour

- ATP Masters 1000 tournaments
- ATP Masters 1000 singles records and statistics
- ATP Masters 1000 doubles records and statistics
