= 2024 Italian Open – Women's singles =

Women's singles
- 2024 Italian Open

Final
- Champion: (Poland) Iga Świątek
- Runner-up: Aryna Sabalenka
- Score: 6–2, 6–3

Details
- Draw: 96
- Seeds: 32

Events
Singles	men	women
Doubles	men	women
- Italian Open

Iga Świątek defeated Aryna Sabalenka in the final, 6–2, 6–3 to win the women's singles tennis title at the 2024 Italian Open. It was her third title at the Italian Open in four years. Świątek was the first woman to win a third title in Rome since Maria Sharapova in 2015, and the youngest (as a 22-year-old) to do so since Gabriela Sabatini in 1991. Świątek did not lose a set or face a tiebreak during the tournament.

This marked the first time that the same players contested the finals of both Madrid and Rome consecutively in the same year (since the women's event in Madrid was created in 2009). This also marked the first time in the tournament's history the Rome final was contested by the top two players in the world. Świątek and Sabalenka were the fifth and sixth players to reach the finals of both events in the same year, after Dinara Safina, Serena Williams, Simona Halep and Ons Jabeur, with Świątek joining Safina (2009) and Williams (2013) as the only women to win both tournaments in the same year.

Elena Rybakina was the reigning champion, but withdrew due to illness.

With Świątek, Sabalenka, and Coco Gauff all reaching the semifinals, this marked the first time that the top three women's players in the world all reached the semifinals at the same event since the 2013 French Open, excluding the WTA Finals.

== Seeds ==
All seeds received a bye into the second round.

1. (Poland) Iga Świątek (champion)
2. Aryna Sabalenka (final)
3. (United States) Coco Gauff (semifinals)
4. (Kazakhstan) Elena Rybakina (withdrew)
5. (Greece) Maria Sakkari (fourth round)
6. (Czech Republic) Markéta Vondroušová (third round)
7. (China) Zheng Qinwen (quarterfinals)
8. (Tunisia) Ons Jabeur (second round)
9. (Latvia) Jeļena Ostapenko (quarterfinals)
10. Daria Kasatkina (third round)
11. (Italy) Jasmine Paolini (second round)
12. (Brazil) Beatriz Haddad Maia (third round)
13. (United States) Danielle Collins (semifinals)
14. Ekaterina Alexandrova (second round)
15. Liudmila Samsonova (second round)
16. (Ukraine) Elina Svitolina (fourth round)
17. Veronika Kudermetova (second round)
18. (United States) Madison Keys (quarterfinals)
19. (Ukraine) Marta Kostyuk (second round)
20. Anastasia Pavlyuchenkova (second round)
21. (United States) Emma Navarro (second round)
22. (France) Caroline Garcia (third round)
23. Anna Kalinskaya (third round)
24. Victoria Azarenka (quarterfinals)
25. (Czech Republic) Barbora Krejčíková (withdrew)
26. (United Kingdom) Katie Boulter (second round)
27. (Belgium) Elise Mertens (third round)
28. (Romania) Sorana Cîrstea (fourth round)
29. (Czech Republic) Linda Nosková (third round)
30. (Ukraine) Anhelina Kalinina (third round)
31. (United States) Sloane Stephens (second round)
32. (Ukraine) Dayana Yastremska (third round)

Click on the seed number of a player to go to their draw section.

== Draw ==
Key

- Q = Qualifier
- WC = Wild card
- LL = Lucky loser
- Alt = Alternate
- ITF = ITF entry
- PR = Protected ranking
- SR = Special ranking
- SE = Special exempt
- JE = Junior exempt
- JR = Junior Accelerator Programme entrant
- CO = College Accelerator Programme entrant
- NG = Next Gen Accelerator Program entrant
- w/o = Walkover
- r = Retired
- d = Defaulted

=== Finals ===
Quarterfinals
1	(Poland) Iga Świątek	6	6
18	(United States) Madison Keys	1	3
3	(United States) Coco Gauff	7^{7}	6
7	(China) Zheng Qinwen	6^{4}	1
24	Victoria Azarenka	4	3
13	(United States) Danielle Collins	6	6
9	(Latvia) Jeļena Ostapenko	2	4
2	Aryna Sabalenka	6	6

Semifinals
1	(Poland) Iga Świątek	6	6
3	(United States) Coco Gauff	4	3
13	(United States) Danielle Collins	5	2
2	Aryna Sabalenka	7	6

Final
1	(Poland) Iga Świątek	6	6
2	Aryna Sabalenka	2	3

=== Top half ===
==== Section 1 ====
First round
(United States) C Dolehide	6^{6}	3
Q	(United States) B Pera	7^{8}	6
WC	(Italy) M Trevisan	3	4
(Kazakhstan) Y Putintseva	6	6
PR	(United States) L Davis	1	0
PR	(Germany) A Kerber	6	6
(Slovakia) AK Schmiedlová	2	6^{6}
Q	A Sasnovich	6	7^{8}

Second round
1	(Poland) I Świątek	6	6
Q	(United States) B Pera	0	2
(Kazakhstan) Y Putintseva	6	6
31	(United States) S Stephens	3	2
17	V Kudermetova	3	0
PR	(Germany) A Kerber	6	6
Q	A Sasnovich	6	6
14	E Alexandrova	0	1

Third round
1	(Poland) I Świątek	6	6
(Kazakhstan) Y Putintseva	3	4
PR	(Germany) A Kerber	6	7^{7}
Q	A Sasnovich	3	6^{4}

Fourth round
1	(Poland) I Świątek	7	6
PR	(Germany) A Kerber	5	3

==== Section 2 ====
First round
(China) Xin Wang	4	6	6
(China) Y Yuan	6	1	2
(Netherlands) A Rus	6	3	4
(Colombia) C Osorio	4	6	6
(United States) T Townsend	6	2	0
Q	(Czech Republic) B Fruhvirtová	3	6	6
(Romania) A Bogdan	6	6
(Canada) L Fernandez	4	1

Second round
12	(Brazil) B Haddad Maia	4	6	6
(China) Xin Wang	6	3	4
(Colombia) C Osorio	0	6	3
18	(United States) M Keys	6	4	6
28	(Romania) S Cîrstea	7	6
Q	(Czech Republic) B Fruhvirtová	5	0
(Romania) A Bogdan	2	6	4
6	(Czech Republic) M Vondroušová	6	3	6

Third round
12	(Brazil) B Haddad Maia	4	6	3
18	(United States) M Keys	6	4	6
28	(Romania) S Cîrstea	7^{7}	6
6	(Czech Republic) M Vondroušová	6^{1}	3

Fourth round
18	(United States) M Keys	6	6
28	(Romania) S Cîrstea	2	1

==== Section 3 ====
First round
(Poland) M Fręch	7^{7}	6
(United States) A Krueger	6^{2}	3
E Avanesyan	6^{3}	6	7
(Spain) C Bucșa	7^{7}	0	5
M Andreeva	2	3
PR	(Spain) P Badosa	6	6
(Belgium) G Minnen	2	3
D Shnaider	6	6

Second round
3	(United States) C Gauff	6	6
(Poland) M Fręch	3	3
E Avanesyan	7	2	2
LL	(Romania) J Cristian	5	6	6
21	(United States) E Navarro	6	4	2
PR	(Spain) P Badosa	1	6	6
D Shnaider	6	6
15	L Samsonova	1	3

Third round
3	(United States) C Gauff	6	0	6
LL	(Romania) J Cristian	1	6	3
PR	(Spain) P Badosa	5	6	6
D Shnaider	7	4	4

Fourth round
3	(United States) C Gauff	5	6	6
PR	(Spain) P Badosa	7	4	1

==== Section 4 ====
First round
(Germany) T Maria	7^{7}	3	6
Q	(Czech Republic) L Fruhvirtová	6^{5}	6	2
PR	(Japan) N Osaka	7^{7}	6
(France) C Burel	6^{2}	1
WC	(Italy) V Paganetti	5	3
WC	(Italy) L Stefanini	7	6
WC	(Italy) L Pigato	1	0
PR	(United States) S Rogers	6	6

Second round
10	D Kasatkina	7	6
(Germany) T Maria	5	1
PR	(Japan) N Osaka	6	6
19	(Ukraine) M Kostyuk	3	2
29	(Czech Republic) L Nosková	6	7^{7}
WC	(Italy) L Stefanini	3	6^{1}
PR	(United States) S Rogers	2	0
7	(China) Q Zheng	6	6

Third round
10	D Kasatkina	3	3
PR	(Japan) N Osaka	6	6
29	(Czech Republic) L Nosková	6	1	2
7	(China) Q Zheng	3	6	6

Fourth round
PR	(Japan) N Osaka	2	4
7	(China) Q Zheng	6	6

=== Bottom half ===
==== Section 5 ====
First round
WC	(Italy) F Di Sarra	1	3
Q	(France) V Gracheva	6	6
(Croatia) D Vekić	2	6	6^{5}
(Ukraine) L Tsurenko	6	3	7^{7}
(China) L Zhu	3	2
(Poland) M Linette	6	6
(Croatia) P Martić	2	2
(Egypt) M Sherif	6	6

Second round
5	(Greece) M Sakkari	6	6
Q	(France) V Gracheva	2	2
(Ukraine) L Tsurenko	0^{r}
30	(Ukraine) A Kalinina	2
24	V Azarenka	6^{5}	6	6
(Poland) M Linette	7^{7}	4	3
(Egypt) M Sherif	7^{7}	2	6
11	(Italy) J Paolini	6^{4}	6	4

Third round
5	(Greece) M Sakkari	7^{7}	6
30	(Ukraine) A Kalinina	6^{4}	0
24	V Azarenka	6	6^{6}	6
(Egypt) M Sherif	2	7^{8}	3

Fourth round
5	(Greece) M Sakkari	4	1
24	V Azarenka	6	6

==== Section 6 ====
First round
(France) D Parry	2	3
A Blinkova	6	6
Q	(Mexico) R Zarazúa	6	5	3
(Italy) E Cocciaretto	4	7	6
(Czech Republic) K Siniaková	6	6
WC	(Italy) N Brancaccio	4	2
Q	(Spain) R Masarova	7	3	4
PR	(Romania) I-C Begu	5	6	6

Second round
13	(United States) D Collins	6	0
A Blinkova	4	0^{r}
(Italy) E Cocciaretto	2	6^{5}
22	(France) C Garcia	6	7^{7}
27	(Belgium) E Mertens	6	6
(Czech Republic) K Siniaková	1	4
PR	(Romania) I-C Begu	5
LL	(France) O Dodin	2^{r}

Third round
13	(United States) D Collins	6	6
22	(France) C Garcia	3	3
27	(Belgium) E Mertens	2	0
PR	(Romania) I-C Begu	6	6

Fourth round
13	(United States) D Collins	6	6
PR	(Romania) I-C Begu	0	3

==== Section 7 ====
First round
(United States) S Kenin	6	6
(Italy) L Bronzetti	3	2
Q	(Slovakia) R Šramková	6	6
WC	(Italy) G Pedone	4	1
(Argentina) N Podoroska	4	3
(Spain) S Sorribes Tormo	6	6
A Potapova	6	7
(China) Xiy Wang	1	5

Second round
8	(Tunisia) O Jabeur	5	6	4
(United States) S Kenin	7	2	6
Q	(Slovakia) R Šramková	6	7^{10}
26	(United Kingdom) K Boulter	4	6^{8}
20	A Pavlyuchenkova	3	6	5
(Spain) S Sorribes Tormo	6	1	7
A Potapova	4	2
9	(Latvia) J Ostapenko	6	6

Third round
(United States) S Kenin	4	6	4
Q	(Slovakia) R Šramková	6	4	6
(Spain) S Sorribes Tormo	4	7	1
9	(Latvia) J Ostapenko	6	5	6

Fourth round
Q	(Slovakia) R Šramková	6	4	6^{3}
9	(Latvia) J Ostapenko	4	6	7^{7}

==== Section 8 ====
First round
WC	(Italy) S Errani	4	6	6
PR	(United States) A Anisimova	6	2	1
PR	(Australia) D Saville	2	3
Q	(Denmark) C Tauson	6	6
Q	(Argentina) ML Carlé	6	4	4
Q	(Germany) L Siegemund	2	6	6
(China) Y Wang	6^{6}	1
Q	(United States) K Volynets	7^{8}	6

Second round
16	(Ukraine) E Svitolina	6	6
WC	(Italy) S Errani	0	2
Q	(Denmark) C Tauson	1	2
23	A Kalinskaya	6	6
32	(Ukraine) D Yastremska	4	7	6
Q	(Germany) L Siegemund	6	5	2
Q	(United States) K Volynets	6	3	2
2	A Sabalenka	4	6	6

Third round
16	(Ukraine) E Svitolina	6	6
23	A Kalinskaya	3	3
32	(Ukraine) D Yastremska	4	2
2	A Sabalenka	6	6

Fourth round
16	(Ukraine) E Svitolina	6	1	6^{7}
2	A Sabalenka	4	6	7^{9}

== Seeded players ==
The following are the seeded players. Seedings are based on WTA rankings as of 22 April 2024. Rankings and points before are as of 6 May 2024.

Under the 2024 WTA Rulebook, points from all combined ATP/WTA 1000 tournaments (which include Rome) are required to be counted in a player's ranking.

Seed	Rank	Player	Points before	Points defending	Points earned	Points after	Status
1	1	(Poland) Iga Świątek	10,910	215	1,000	11,695	Champion, defeated Aryna Sabalenka [2]
2	2	Aryna Sabalenka	7,498	10	650	8,138	Runner-up, lost to (Poland) Iga Świątek [1]
3	3	(United States) Coco Gauff	7,313	65	390	7,638	Semifinals lost to (Poland) Iga Świątek [1]
4	4	(Kazakhstan) Elena Rybakina	6,673	1,000	0	5,673	Withdrew due to illness
5	8	(Greece) Maria Sakkari	3,925	65	120	3,980	Fourth round lost to Victoria Azarenka [24]
6	6	(Czech Republic) Markéta Vondroušová	4,090	120	65	4,035	Third round lost to (Romania) Sorana Cîrstea [28]
7	7	(China) Zheng Qinwen	3,945	215	215	3,945	Quarterfinals lost to (United States) Coco Gauff [3]
8	9	(Tunisia) Ons Jabeur	3,748	10	10	3,748	Second round lost to (United States) Sofia Kenin
9	10	(Latvia) Jeļena Ostapenko	3,493	390	215	3,318	Quarterfinals lost to Aryna Sabalenka [2]
10	11	Daria Kasatkina	3,313	120	65	3,258	Third round lost to (Japan) Naomi Osaka [PR]
11	12	(Italy) Jasmine Paolini	3,048	(160)^{†}	10	2,898	Second round lost to (Egypt) Mayar Sherif
12	13	(Brazil) Beatriz Haddad Maia	3,035	215	65	2,885	Third round lost to (United States) Madison Keys [18]
13	15	(United States) Danielle Collins	2,759	(1)^{‡}	390	3,148	Semifinals lost to Aryna Sabalenka [2]
14	18	Ekaterina Alexandrova	2,450	10	10	2,450	Second round lost to Aliaksandra Sasnovich [Q]
15	17	Liudmila Samsonova	2,495	65	10	2,440	Second round lost to Diana Shnaider
16	19	(Ukraine) Elina Svitolina	2,400	10	120	2,510	Fourth round lost to Aryna Sabalenka [2]
17	25	Veronika Kudermetova	2,003	390	10	1,623	Second round lost to (Germany) Angelique Kerber [PR]
18	16	(United States) Madison Keys	2,688	120	215	2,783	Quarterfinals lost to (Poland) Iga Świątek [1]
19	20	(Ukraine) Marta Kostyuk	2,235	65	10	2,180	Second round lost to (Japan) Naomi Osaka [PR]
20	21	Anastasia Pavlyuchenkova	2,191	35	10	2,166	Second round lost to (Spain) Sara Sorribes Tormo
21	22	(United States) Emma Navarro	2,143	(85)^{§}	10	2,068	Second round lost to (Spain) Paula Badosa [PR]
22	23	(France) Caroline Garcia	2,068	65	65	2,068	Third round lost to (United States) Danielle Collins [13]
23	26	Anna Kalinskaya	1,916	65	65	1,916	Third round lost to (Ukraine) Elina Svitolina [16]
24	24	Victoria Azarenka	2,024	65	215	2,174	Quarterfinals lost to (United States) Danielle Collins [13]
25	27	(Czech Republic) Barbora Krejčiková	1,832	65	0	1,767	Withdrew due to illness
26	28	(United Kingdom) Katie Boulter	1,742	(48)^{^}	10	1,704	Second round lost to (Slovakia) Rebecca Šramková [Q]
27	30	(Belgium) Elise Mertens	1,684	10	65	1,739	Third round lost to (Romania) Irina-Camelia Begu [PR]
28	32	(Romania) Sorana Cîrstea	1,619	35	120	1,704	Fourth round lost to (United States) Madison Keys [18]
29	29	(Czech Republic) Linda Nosková	1,684	35	65	1,714	Third round lost to (China) Zheng Qinwen [7]
30	31	(Ukraine) Anhelina Kalinina	1,666	650	65	1,081	Third round lost to (Greece) Maria Sakkari [5]
31	35	(United States) Sloane Stephens	1,552	35	10	1,527	Second round lost to (Kazakhstan) Yulia Putintseva
32	33	(Ukraine) Dayana Yastremska	1,590	30+15	65+12	1,622	Third round lost to Aryna Sabalenka [2]

† The player's 2023 points did not count towards her ranking on 6 May 2024 because the 2023 tournament was not mandatory. She is defending points from a WTA 125 event held during the second week of the 2023 tournament instead.
‡ The player withdrew from the tournament in 2023, when it was non-mandatory. Points from her 18th best result will be deducted instead.
§ The player did not qualify for the main draw in 2023. Points from her 18th best result will be deducted instead.
^ The player did not qualify for the main draw in 2023. She is defending points from an ITF tournament instead.

=== Withdrawn players ===
The following players would have been seeded, but withdrew before the tournament began.

Rank	Player	Points before	Points dropped	Points after	Withdrawal reason
5	(United States) Jessica Pegula	4,655	(105)^{†}	4,550	Injury
14	(Czech Republic) Karolína Muchová	2,930	120	2,810	Wrist surgery

† The player's 2023 points did not count towards her ranking on 6 May 2024 because the 2023 tournament was not mandatory. Points for her 18th best result will be deducted instead.

== Other entry information ==
=== Wild cards ===
- (Italy) Nuria Brancaccio
- (Italy) Federica Di Sarra
- (Italy) Sara Errani
- (Italy) Vittoria Paganetti
- (Italy) Giorgia Pedone
- (Italy) Lisa Pigato
- (Italy) Lucrezia Stefanini
- (Italy) Martina Trevisan

=== Protected ranking ===
- (United States) Amanda Anisimova
- (Spain) Paula Badosa
- (Romania) Irina-Camelia Begu
- (United States) Lauren Davis
- (Germany) Angelique Kerber
- (Japan) Naomi Osaka
- (United States) Shelby Rogers
- (Australia) Daria Saville

=== Withdrawals ===
- ‡ (Czech Republic) Marie Bouzková → replaced by (Spain) Cristina Bucșa
- § (Czech Republic) Barbora Krejčíková → replaced by (Romania) Jaqueline Cristian
- † (Czech Republic) Petra Kvitová → replaced by (United States) Ashlyn Krueger
- † (Czech Republic) Karolína Muchová → replaced by (Slovakia) Anna Karolína Schmiedlová
- ‡ (United States) Jessica Pegula → replaced by (China) Wang Yafan
- ‡ (Czech Republic) Karolína Plíšková → replaced by (Egypt) Mayar Sherif
- § (Kazakhstan) Elena Rybakina → replaced by (France) Océane Dodin

† – not included on entry list
‡ – withdrew from entry list
§ – withdrew from main draw

== Qualifying ==
=== Seeds ===
1. (Romania) Jaqueline Cristian (qualifying competition, lucky loser)
2. (France) Océane Dodin (qualifying competition, lucky loser)
3. (Switzerland) Viktorija Golubic (qualifying competition)
4. (United States) Bernarda Pera (qualified)
5. (Denmark) Clara Tauson (qualified)
6. (Bulgaria) Viktoriya Tomova (qualifying competition)
7. (Argentina) María Lourdes Carlé (qualified)
8. (Germany) Laura Siegemund (qualified)
9. (Japan) Nao Hibino (withdrew)
10. (United Kingdom) Harriet Dart (first round)
11. (Spain) Rebeka Masarova (qualified)
12. (China) Bai Zhuoxuan (first round)
13. (France) Varvara Gracheva (qualified)
14. (Spain) Jéssica Bouzas Maneiro (first round)
15. (Argentina) Julia Riera (qualifying competition)
16. (Hungary) Anna Bondár (qualifying competition)
17. Kamilla Rakhimova (first round)
18. Maria Timofeeva (first round)
19. Erika Andreeva (first round)
20. (Mexico) Renata Zarazúa (qualified)
21. (United States) Katie Volynets (qualified)
22. (Czech Republic) Brenda Fruhvirtová (qualified)
23. (France) Alizé Cornet (withdrew)
24. Aliaksandra Sasnovich (qualified)

=== Qualifiers ===
1. (France) Varvara Gracheva
2. (Czech Republic) Brenda Fruhvirtová
3. (Czech Republic) Linda Fruhvirtová
4. (United States) Bernarda Pera
5. (Denmark) Clara Tauson
6. (Mexico) Renata Zarazúa
7. (Argentina) María Lourdes Carlé
8. (Germany) Laura Siegemund
9. (United States) Katie Volynets
10. (Slovakia) Rebecca Šramková
11. (Spain) Rebeka Masarova
12. Aliaksandra Sasnovich

=== Lucky losers ===
1. (Romania) Jaqueline Cristian
2. (France) Océane Dodin

=== Qualifying draw ===
==== First qualifier ====
First round
1	(Romania) Jaqueline Cristian	4	7	6
(United States) Hailey Baptiste	6	5	3
WC	(Italy) Eleonora Alvisi	1	1
13	(France) Varvara Gracheva	6	6

Qualifying competition
1	(Romania) Jaqueline Cristian	6	2	3
13	(France) Varvara Gracheva	3	6	6

==== Second qualifier ====
First round
2	(France) Océane Dodin	5	6	6
(Hungary) Dalma Gálfi	7	0	3
(Germany) Jule Niemeier	0	2
22	(Czech Republic) Brenda Fruhvirtová	6	6

Qualifying competition
2	(France) Océane Dodin	4	3
22	(Czech Republic) Brenda Fruhvirtová	6	6

==== Third qualifier ====
First round
3	(Switzerland) Viktorija Golubic	4	6	6
WC	(Italy) Silvia Ambrosio	6	4	3
(United Kingdom) Lily Miyazaki	1	6^{2}
Alt	(Czech Republic) Linda Fruhvirtová	6	7^{7}

Qualifying competition
3	(Switzerland) Viktorija Golubic	1	6^{4}
Alt	(Czech Republic) Linda Fruhvirtová	6	7^{7}

==== Fourth qualifier ====
First round
4	(United States) Bernarda Pera	7^{7}	6
(United Kingdom) Heather Watson	6^{0}	3
(United States) Elizabeth Mandlik	4	6	2
16	(Hungary) Anna Bondár	6	4	6

Qualifying competition
4	(United States) Bernarda Pera	3	6	6
16	(Hungary) Anna Bondár	6	4	2

==== Fifth qualifier ====
First round
5	(Denmark) Clara Tauson	6	4	7^{7}
(Australia) Astra Sharma	4	6	6^{2}
(Serbia) Olga Danilović	6	6
17	Kamilla Rakhimova	2	0

Qualifying competition
5	(Denmark) Clara Tauson	6	6
(Serbia) Olga Danilović	2	0

==== Sixth qualifier ====
First round
6	(Bulgaria) Viktoriya Tomova	6	6
WC	(Italy) Anastasia Abbagnato	3	1
(Spain) Nuria Párrizas Díaz	3	3
20	(Mexico) Renata Zarazúa	6	6

Qualifying competition
6	(Bulgaria) Viktoriya Tomova	4	6	6^{5}
20	(Mexico) Renata Zarazúa	6	2	7^{7}

==== Seventh qualifier ====
First round
7	(Argentina) María Lourdes Carlé	6	7
(Colombia) Emiliana Arango	3	5
(Australia) Taylah Preston	6	6
18	Maria Timofeeva	4	2

Qualifying competition
7	(Argentina) María Lourdes Carlé	4	6	6
(Australia) Taylah Preston	6	4	1

==== Eighth qualifier ====
First round
8	(Germany) Laura Siegemund	6	6
WC	(Italy) Beatrice Ricci	3	3
(United States) Sachia Vickery	1	1^{r}
15	(Argentina) Julia Riera	6	4

Qualifying competition
8	(Germany) Laura Siegemund	6	6
15	(Argentina) Julia Riera	4	4

==== Ninth qualifier ====
First round
Alt	(France) Fiona Ferro	3	5
(Ukraine) Yuliia Starodubtseva	6	7
WC	(Italy) Jennifer Ruggeri	2	6^{5}
21	(United States) Katie Volynets	6	7^{7}

Qualifying competition
(Ukraine) Yuliia Starodubtseva	6	4	4
21	(United States) Katie Volynets	4	6	6

==== Tenth qualifier ====
First round
10	(United Kingdom) Harriet Dart	2	3
(Slovakia) Rebecca Šramková	6	6
(Latvia) Darja Semeņistaja	4	6	7
14	(Spain) Jéssica Bouzas Maneiro	6	0	5

Qualifying competition
(Slovakia) Rebecca Šramková	6	6
(Latvia) Darja Semeņistaja	3	4

==== Eleventh qualifier ====
First round
11	(Spain) Rebeka Masarova	6	7^{7}
WC	(Italy) Sofia Rocchetti	2	6^{2}
(Brazil) Laura Pigossi	6	6
19	Erika Andreeva	3	3

Qualifying competition
11	(Spain) Rebeka Masarova	6^{3}	6	7
(Brazil) Laura Pigossi	7^{7}	3	5

==== Twelfth qualifier ====
First round
12	(China) Bai Zhuoxuan	6	5	2
PR	(Serbia) Aleksandra Krunić	2	7	6
(United States) Alycia Parks	1	1
24	Aliaksandra Sasnovich	6	6

Qualifying competition
PR	(Serbia) Aleksandra Krunić	5	2
24	Aliaksandra Sasnovich	7	6
