= 1994 Italian Open – Men's singles =

Men's singles
- 1994 Italian Open

Final
- Champion: (United States) Pete Sampras
- Runner-up: (Germany) Boris Becker
- Score: 6–1, 6–2, 6–2

Details
- Draw: 64
- Seeds: 16

Events
Singles	men	women
Doubles	men	women
← 1993 ·	Italian Open	· 1995 →

Pete Sampras defeated Boris Becker in the final, 6–1, 6–2, 6–2 to win the men's singles tennis title at the 1994 Italian Open.

Jim Courier was the two-time defending champion, but was defeated in the quarterfinals by Sláva Doseděl.

== Seeds ==
1. (United States) Pete Sampras (champion)
2. (Germany) Michael Stich (quarterfinals, withdrew)
3. (United States) Jim Courier (quarterfinals)
4. (Croatia) Goran Ivanišević (semifinals)
5. (United States) Michael Chang (second round)
6. (Ukraine) Andrei Medvedev (third round)
7. (Austria) Thomas Muster (third round)
8. (Germany) Boris Becker (final)
9. (France) Cédric Pioline (third round)
10. (Switzerland) Marc Rosset (first round)
11. (France) Arnaud Boetsch (first round)
12. (United States) Andre Agassi (second round)
13. (South Africa) Wayne Ferreira (third round)
14. (Netherlands) Richard Krajicek (third round)
15. (Russia) Alexander Volkov (second round)
16. (Netherlands) Paul Haarhuis (first round)

== Draw ==
=== Key ===
- Q = Qualifier
- WC = Wild card
- LL = Lucky loser
- Alt = Alternate
- ITF = ITF entry
- PR = Protected ranking
- SR = Special ranking
- SE = Special exempt
- JE = Junior exempt
- JR = Junior Accelerator Programme entrant
- CO = College Accelerator Programme entrant
- NG = Next Gen Accelerator Program entrant
- w/o = Walkover
- r = Retired
- d = Defaulted

=== Finals ===
Quarter-finals
1	(United States) P Sampras	6	7
(Italy) A Gaudenzi	3	5
3	(United States) J Courier	6	3	4
(Czech Republic) S Doseděl	1	6	6
(Netherlands) J Eltingh	6^{5}	3
4	(Croatia) G Ivanišević	7	6
8	(Germany) B Becker	w/o
2	(Germany) M Stich

Semi-finals
1	(United States) P Sampras	6	6
(Czech Republic) S Doseděl	1	2
4	(Croatia) G Ivanišević	2	6^{5}
8	(Germany) B Becker	6	7^{7}

Final
1	(United States) P Sampras	6	6	6
8	(Germany) B Becker	1	2	2

=== Section 1 ===
First round
1	(United States) P Sampras	6	7^{7}
(United States) A Krickstein	1	6^{2}
Q	(France) F Fontang	6^{1}	7	5
(Spain) À Corretja	7^{7}	5	7
WC	(Italy) D Nargiso	5	7	6
Q	(France) A Beust	7	5	2
(Russia) A Chesnokov	7	6
16	(Netherlands) P Haarhuis	5	0
10	(Switzerland) M Rosset	4	6^{5}
(Netherlands) J Siemerink	6	7
(Italy) A Gaudenzi	6	6
(Haiti) R Agénor	2	3
(Russia) A Olhovskiy	6	3	7
(Morocco) Y El Aynaoui	4	6	5
(Russia) A Cherkasov	4	2
7	(Austria) T Muster	6	6

Second round
1	(United States) P Sampras	6	3	6
(Spain) À Corretja	3	6	3
WC	(Italy) D Nargiso	6	3	1
(Russia) A Chesnokov	2	6	6
(Netherlands) J Siemerink	4	3
(Italy) A Gaudenzi	6	6
(Russia) A Olhovskiy	6	5	5
7	(Austria) T Muster	4	7	7

Third round
1	(United States) P Sampras	7^{10}	6
(Russia) A Chesnokov	6^{8}	3
(Italy) A Gaudenzi	4
7	(Austria) T Muster	1	r

Quarter-finals
1	(United States) P Sampras	6	7
(Italy) A Gaudenzi	3	5

=== Section 2 ===
First round
3	(United States) J Courier	6	6
Q	(Czech Republic) L Němeček	3	3
(Austria) G Schaller	5	6^{0}
Q	(Spain) A Costa	7	7^{7}
(France) H Leconte	6	6^{5}	7^{7}
(United States) P McEnroe	3	7^{7}	6^{3}
(Canada) G Rusedski	6	6^{6}	2
13	(South Africa) W Ferreira	3	7^{8}	6
11	(France) A Boetsch	6	5	0
(Czech Republic) S Doseděl	3	7	6
WC	(Italy) P Canè	6	1	7
(Peru) J Yzaga	4	6	5
WC	(Italy) G Pozzi	0	3
(Italy) R Furlan	6	6
Q	(Spain) O Martinez	6	4	6^{4}
6	(Ukraine) A Medvedev	3	6	7^{7}

Second round
3	(United States) J Courier	6	6
Q	(Spain) A Costa	3	4
(France) H Leconte	2	7^{7}	1
13	(South Africa) W Ferreira	6	6^{5}	6
(Czech Republic) S Doseděl	7^{7}	6
WC	(Italy) P Canè	6^{4}	3
(Italy) R Furlan	4	6	2
6	(Ukraine) A Medvedev	6	4	6

Third round
3	(United States) J Courier	6^{3}	6	6
13	(South Africa) W Ferreira	7^{7}	4	4
(Czech Republic) S Doseděl	6	6
6	(Ukraine) A Medvedev	1	2

Quarter-finals
3	(United States) J Courier	6	3	4
(Czech Republic) S Doseděl	1	6	6

=== Section 3 ===
First round
5	(United States) M Chang	6	3	7
(Australia) P Rafter	3	6	5
(Netherlands) J Eltingh	6	6
(Spain) J Arrese	4	3
(Italy) S Pescosolido	6	6
(United States) R Reneberg	3	4
(Spain) T Carbonell	6	1	5
12	(United States) A Agassi	4	6	7
14	(Netherlands) R Krajicek	6	6
(Germany) M-C Goellner	4	2
(Australia) R Fromberg	6	7^{8}
Q	(Spain) F Roig	4	6^{6}
(Russia) Y Kafelnikov	6	7^{7}
(Spain) J Burillo	3	6^{5}
(Israel) A Mansdorf	4	6^{2}
4	(Croatia) G Ivanišević	6	7^{7}

Second round
5	(United States) M Chang	3	6^{4}
(Netherlands) J Eltingh	6	7^{7}
(Italy) S Pescosolido	6	1	6
12	(United States) A Agassi	3	6	3
14	(Netherlands) R Krajicek	6	7
(Australia) R Fromberg	4	5
(Russia) Y Kafelnikov	2	4
4	(Croatia) G Ivanišević	6	6

Third round
(Netherlands) J Eltingh	4	7	6
(Italy) S Pescosolido	6	5	4
14	(Netherlands) R Krajicek	2	4
4	(Croatia) G Ivanišević	6	6

Quarter-finals
(Netherlands) J Eltingh	6^{5}	3
4	(Croatia) G Ivanišević	7^{7}	6

=== Section 4 ===
First round
8	(Germany) B Becker	6	1	6
(Czech Republic) K Nováček	1	6	1
(Spain) J Sánchez	7	0	6
Q	(Egypt) T El Sawy	5	6	4
(Germany) K Braasch	2	4
(Czech Republic) D Vacek	6	6
(Sweden) N Kulti	4	3
9	(France) C Pioline	6	6
15	(Russia) A Volkov	6^{7}	6	6
(Sweden) J Svensson	7^{9}	2	0
WC	(Italy) O Camporese	6^{3}	2
Q	(Morocco) K Alami	7	6
(Spain) A Berasategui	6	6
(Spain) E Sánchez	2	2
(Czech Republic) D Rikl	6^{4}	4
2	(Germany) M Stich	7^{7}	6

Second round
8	(Germany) B Becker	6	6
(Spain) J Sánchez	2	2
(Czech Republic) D Vacek	6	1	5
9	(France) C Pioline	4	6	7
15	(Russia) A Volkov	4	4
Q	(Morocco) K Alami	6	6
(Spain) A Berasategui	6	6^{5}	5
2	(Germany) M Stich	2	7^{7}	7

Third round
8	(Germany) B Becker	6	6
9	(France) C Pioline	3	4
Q	(Morocco) K Alami	6^{5}	4
2	(Germany) M Stich	7^{7}	6

Quarter-finals
8	(Germany) B Becker	w/o
2	(Germany) M Stich
