= 1994 Italian Open – Men's doubles =

Men's doubles
- 1994 Italian Open

Final
- Champions: (Russia) Yevgeny Kafelnikov (Czech Republic) David Rikl
- Runners-up: (South Africa) Wayne Ferreira (Spain) Javier Sánchez
- Score: 6–1, 7–5

Details
- Draw: 32
- Seeds: 8

Events
Singles	men	women
Doubles	men	women
← 1993 ·	Italian Open	· 1995 →

Jacco Eltingh and Paul Haarhuis were the defending champions, but lost in second round to Jan Apell and Mike Bauer.

Yevgeny Kafelnikov and David Rikl won the title by defeating Wayne Ferreira and Javier Sánchez 6–1, 7–5 in the final.

== Seeds ==
1. (Canada) Grant Connell / (United States) Patrick Galbraith (first round)
2. (Netherlands) Jacco Eltingh / (Netherlands) Paul Haarhuis (second round)
3. (Netherlands) Tom Nijssen / (Czech Republic) Cyril Suk (first round)
4. (South Africa) David Adams / (Russia) Andrei Olhovskiy (first round)
5. (United States) Patrick McEnroe / (United States) Richey Reneberg (first round)
6. (United States) Luke Jensen / (United States) Murphy Jensen (second round)
7. (South Africa) Gary Muller / (South Africa) Danie Visser (first round)
8. (Spain) Sergio Casal / (Spain) Emilio Sánchez (first round)

== Draw ==
=== Key ===
- Q = Qualifier
- WC = Wild card
- LL = Lucky loser
- Alt = Alternate
- ITF = ITF entry
- PR = Protected ranking
- SR = Special ranking
- SE = Special exempt
- JE = Junior exempt
- JR = Junior Accelerator Programme entrant
- CO = College Accelerator Programme entrant
- NG = Next Gen Accelerator Program entrant
- w/o = Walkover
- r = Retired
- d = Defaulted

=== Finals ===
Semifinals
(South Africa) John-Laffnie de Jager (South Africa) Byron Talbot	4	4
(South Africa) Wayne Ferreira (Spain) Javier Sánchez	6	6
(Russia) Yevgeny Kafelnikov (Czech Republic) David Rikl	6	6
(Germany) Marc-Kevin Goellner (Italy) Diego Nargiso	4	3

Final
(South Africa) Wayne Ferreira (Spain) Javier Sánchez	1	5
(Russia) Yevgeny Kafelnikov (Czech Republic) David Rikl	6	7

=== Top half ===
First round
1	(Canada) G Connell (United States) P Galbraith	4	4
(South Africa) JL de Jager (South Africa) B Talbot	6	6
(Czech Republic) K Nováček (Germany) U Riglewski	6	7
WC	(Italy) O Camporese (Italy) C Caratti	4	5
(United States) B Pearce (United States) D Randall	6	7
(Germany) B Becker (Australia) P Rafter	3	5
Q	(Uruguay) D Pérez (Spain) F Roig	6	6
8	(Spain) S Casal (Spain) E Sánchez	1	2
4	(South Africa) D Adams (Russia) A Olhovskiy	3	3
(South Africa) W Ferreira (Spain) J Sánchez	6	6
WC	(Croatia) G Ivanišević (Switzerland) M Rosset	2	6
(Netherlands) J Siemerink (Czech Republic) D Vacek	6	7
(Spain) T Carbonell (South Africa) B Haygarth	6	7	4
(Netherlands) HJ Davids (South Africa) P Norval	7	6	6
(United States) F Montana (United States) J Pugh	6	3	7
5	(United States) P McEnroe (United States) R Reneberg	4	6	6

Second round
(South Africa) JL de Jager (South Africa) B Talbot	6	7
(Czech Republic) K Nováček (Germany) U Riglewski	3	5
(United States) B Pearce (United States) D Randall	4	6	3
Q	(Uruguay) D Pérez (Spain) F Roig	6	4	6
(South Africa) W Ferreira (Spain) J Sánchez	3	6	6
(Netherlands) J Siemerink (Czech Republic) D Vacek	6	3	4
(Netherlands) HJ Davids (South Africa) P Norval	2	7	6
(United States) F Montana (United States) J Pugh	6	6	4

Quarterfinals
(South Africa) JL de Jager (South Africa) B Talbot	6	6	6
Q	(Uruguay) D Pérez (Spain) F Roig	3	7	4
(South Africa) W Ferreira (Spain) J Sánchez	6	6
(Netherlands) HJ Davids (South Africa) P Norval	2	4

Semifinals
(South Africa) JL de Jager (South Africa) B Talbot	4	4
(South Africa) W Ferreira (Spain) J Sánchez	6	6

=== Bottom half ===
First round
6	(United States) L Jensen (United States) M Jensen	7	6
WC	(Italy) A Gaudenzi (Italy) S Pescosolido	6	4
WC	(Italy) R Furlan (Italy) G Pozzi	6	4	1
(United States) M Keil (Czech Republic) L Pimek	3	6	6
Q	(Spain) E Benfele Álvarez (Czech Republic) S Doseděl	6	4
(Russia) Y Kafelnikov (Czech Republic) D Rikl	7	6
(The Bahamas) M Knowles (United States) S Melville	6	6
3	(Netherlands) T Nijssen (Czech Republic) C Suk	4	4
7	(South Africa) G Muller (South Africa) D Visser	2	3
(United States) S Cannon (Australia) D Macpherson	6	6
(Germany) MK Goellner (Italy) D Nargiso	4	7	7
(Sweden) R Bergh (Netherlands) M Oosting	6	5	5
(Sweden) J Apell (United States) M Bauer	6	6
(Italy) C Brandi (Italy) F Mordegan	2	3
(Australia) D Cahill (Australia) J Fitzgerald	5	4
2	(Netherlands) J Eltingh (Netherlands) P Haarhuis	7	6

Second round
6	(United States) L Jensen (United States) M Jensen	5	4
(United States) M Keil (Czech Republic) L Pimek	7	6
(Russia) Y Kafelnikov (Czech Republic) D Rikl	2	6	6
(The Bahamas) M Knowles (United States) S Melville	6	3	4
(United States) S Cannon (Australia) D Macpherson	4	5
(Germany) MK Goellner (Italy) D Nargiso	6	7
(Sweden) J Apell (United States) M Bauer	6	6	6
2	(Netherlands) J Eltingh (Netherlands) P Haarhuis	7	3	4

Quarterfinals
(United States) M Keil (Czech Republic) L Pimek	3	4
(Russia) Y Kafelnikov (Czech Republic) D Rikl	6	6
(Germany) MK Goellner (Italy) D Nargiso	4	7	7
(Sweden) J Apell (United States) M Bauer	6	6	5

Semifinals
(Russia) Y Kafelnikov (Czech Republic) D Rikl	6	6
(Germany) MK Goellner (Italy) D Nargiso	4	3
