= 1993 Italian Open – Men's singles =

Men's singles
- 1993 Italian Open

Final
- Champion: (United States) Jim Courier
- Runner-up: (Croatia) Goran Ivanišević
- Score: 6–1, 6–2, 6–2

Details
- Draw: 64
- Seeds: 16

Events
Singles	men	women
Doubles	men	women
← 1992 ·	Italian Open	· 1994 →

Defending champion Jim Courier defeated Goran Ivanišević in the final, 6–1, 6–2, 6–2 to win the men's singles tennis title at the 1993 Italian Open.

== Seeds ==
1. (United States) Pete Sampras (semifinals)
2. (United States) Jim Courier (champion)
3. (Germany) Boris Becker (third round)
4. (Croatia) Goran Ivanišević (finals)
5. (United States) Ivan Lendl (first round)
6. (United States) Michael Chang (semifinals)
7. (Spain) Sergi Bruguera (quarterfinals)
8. (Ukraine) Andrei Medvedev (third round)
9. (Netherlands) Richard Krajicek (first round)
10. (Czechoslovakia) Karel Nováček (third round)
11. (South Africa) Wayne Ferreira (first round)
12. (United States) MaliVai Washington (first round)
13. (Austria) Thomas Muster (second round)
14. (France) Cédric Pioline (second round)
15. (Spain) Carlos Costa (second round)
16. (France) Fabrice Santoro (third round)

== Draw ==
=== Key ===
- Q = Qualifier
- WC = Wild card
- LL = Lucky loser
- Alt = Alternate
- SE = Special exempt
- PR = Protected ranking
- ITF = ITF entry
- JE = Junior exempt
- w/o = Walkover
- r = Retired
- d = Defaulted
- SR = Special ranking

=== Finals ===
Semifinals
1	(United States) Pete Sampras	6^{4}	2
4	(Croatia) Goran Ivanišević	7^{7}	6
6	(United States) Michael Chang	2	7^{7}	0
2	(United States) Jim Courier	6	6^{2}	6

Final
4	(Croatia) Goran Ivanišević	1	2	2
2	(United States) Jim Courier	6	6	6

=== Top half ===
==== Section 1 ====
First round
1	(United States) P Sampras	6	7^{7}
(Italy) R Furlan	1	6^{3}
Q	(Spain) Á Corretja	6	3	6
WC	(Italy) P Canè	3	6	3
(Sweden) C Bergström	4	7^{7}	6
(Argentina) F Davín	6	6^{3}	4
WC	(Italy) D Nargiso	6	2	6^{5}
15	(Spain) C Costa	3	6	7^{7}
9	(Netherlands) R Krajicek	6^{5}	6	3
(Argentina) G Pérez Roldán	7^{7}	4	6
(Germany) P Kühnen	6^{1}	3
(France) A Boetsch	7^{7}	6
(Russia) A Olhovskiy	6	1	2
(Denmark) K Carlsen	3	6	6
(Sweden) J Svensson	6	4	3
8	(Ukraine) A Medvedev	0	6	6

Second round
1	(United States) P Sampras	6	7
Q	(Spain) Á Corretja	4	5
(Sweden) C Bergström	6	6^{3}	6
15	(Spain) C Costa	2	7^{7}	3
(Argentina) G Pérez Roldán	6	7^{10}
(France) A Boetsch	3	6^{8}
(Denmark) K Carlsen	2	2
8	(Ukraine) A Medvedev	6	6

Third round
1	(United States) P Sampras	6	6
(Sweden) C Bergström	2	4
(Argentina) G Pérez Roldán	6	6
8	(Ukraine) A Medvedev	4	4

Quarterfinals
1	(United States) P Sampras	6	6
(Argentina) G Pérez Roldán	0	2

==== Section 2 ====
First round
4	(Croatia) G Ivanišević	6	6^{5}	6
(Brazil) J Oncins	3	7^{7}	3
Q	(France) F Fontang	2	1
(Sweden) M Gustafsson	6	6
(Switzerland) M Rosset	6	6
(Spain) E Sánchez	2	1
(Switzerland) J Hlasek	3	6	5
13	(Austria) T Muster	6	3	7
12	(United States) M Washington	4	6^{5}
(Netherlands) J Siemerink	6	7^{7}
(Germany) B Karbacher	6	6
(Argentina) A Mancini	4	1
(France) G Raoux	6	3	6
(Italy) G Pozzi	3	6	3
(Uruguay) M Filippini	6	6
5	(United States) I Lendl	2	1

Second round
4	(Croatia) G Ivanišević	6	6
(Sweden) M Gustafsson	3	4
(Switzerland) M Rosset	7^{7}	4	6
13	(Austria) T Muster	6^{4}	6	4
(Netherlands) J Siemerink	6	6
(Germany) B Karbacher	1	4
(France) G Raoux	6	6^{4}	6^{5}
(Uruguay) M Filippini	3	7^{7}	7^{7}

Third round
4	(Croatia) G Ivanišević	6	6
(Switzerland) M Rosset	4	3
(Netherlands) J Siemerink	4	4
(Uruguay) M Filippini	6	6

Quarterfinals
4	(Croatia) G Ivanišević	7^{7}	6
(Uruguay) M Filippini	6^{5}	4

=== Bottom half ===
==== Section 3 ====
First round
6	(United States) M Chang	6	6
(Spain) J Arrese	2	3
Q	(Spain) F Roig	7	2	1
Q	(Italy) A Gaudenzi	5	6	6
Q	(Italy) C Pistolesi	6	6
(Netherlands) J Eltingh	3	3
(Germany) C-U Steeb	6	6
11	(South Africa) W Ferreira	3	2
14	(France) C Pioline	6	6
WC	(Italy) M Cierro	1	2
(Italy) O Camporese	4	3
(Russia) A Chesnokov	6	6
Q	(Hungary) S Noszály	7^{7}	7
WC	(Italy) C Caratti	6^{2}	5
(Russia) A Cherkasov	4	3
3	(Germany) B Becker	6	6

Second round
6	(United States) M Chang	5	6	6
Q	(Italy) A Gaudenzi	7	4	3
Q	(Italy) C Pistolesi	1	1
(Germany) C-U Steeb	6	6
14	(France) C Pioline	7^{7}	3	0
(Russia) A Chesnokov	6^{4}	6	6
Q	(Hungary) S Noszály	3	2
3	(Germany) B Becker	6	6

Third round
6	(United States) M Chang	6	7^{7}
(Germany) C-U Steeb	2	6^{3}
(Russia) A Chesnokov	6	3	7^{7}
3	(Germany) B Becker	2	6	6^{3}

Quarterfinals
6	(United States) M Chang	6	5	7
(Russia) A Chesnokov	3	7	5

==== Section 4 ====
First round
7	(Spain) S Bruguera	6	6
WC	(Italy) S Pescosolido	4	2
(Spain) F Clavet	7^{7}	3	7
(Sweden) M Larsson	6^{5}	6	5
(Sweden) N Kulti	6	3	7
Q	(France) G Marx	4	6	5
(Peru) J Yzaga	6^{5}	2
10	(Czech Republic) K Nováček	7^{7}	6
16	(France) F Santoro	6	3
(Spain) J Sánchez	4	1^{r}
(Brazil) L Mattar	7^{7}	7^{7}
(Israel) A Mansdorf	6^{5}	6^{2}
(Netherlands) P Haarhuis	7^{9}	6
(South Africa) M Ondruska	6^{7}	2
Q	(Argentina) H de la Peña	2	1
2	(United States) J Courier	6	6

Second round
7	(Spain) S Bruguera	6	6
(Spain) F Clavet	3	0
(Sweden) N Kulti	3	2
10	(Czech Republic) K Nováček	6	6
16	(France) F Santoro	3	6	6
(Brazil) L Mattar	6	3	4
(Netherlands) P Haarhuis	3	6	0
2	(United States) J Courier	6	2	6

Third round
7	(Spain) S Bruguera	6	6
10	(Czech Republic) K Nováček	4	1
16	(France) F Santoro	3	3
2	(United States) J Courier	6	6

Quarterfinals
7	(Spain) S Bruguera	3	4
2	(United States) J Courier	6	6
