= 1993 Italian Open – Men's doubles =

Men's doubles
- 1993 Italian Open

Final
- Champions: (Netherlands) Jacco Eltingh (Netherlands) Paul Haarhuis
- Runners-up: (South Africa) Wayne Ferreira (Australia) Mark Kratzmann
- Score: 6–4, 7–6

Details
- Draw: 32
- Seeds: 8

Events
Singles	men	women
Doubles	men	women
← 1992 ·	Italian Open	· 1994 →

Jakob Hlasek and Marc Rosset were the defending champions, but lost in the first round to Luke Jensen and Murphy Jensen.

Jacco Eltingh and Paul Haarhuis won the title by defeating Wayne Ferreira and Mark Kratzmann 6–4, 7–6 in the final.

== Seeds ==
1. (Switzerland) Jakob Hlasek / (Switzerland) Marc Rosset (first round)
2. (South Africa) David Adams / (Russia) Andrei Olhovskiy (first round)
3. (South Africa) Danie Visser / (Australia) Laurie Warder (second round)
4. (United States) Steve DeVries / (Australia) David Macpherson (second round)
5. (Canada) Grant Connell / (United States) Patrick Galbraith (first round)
6. (Netherlands) Jacco Eltingh / (Netherlands) Paul Haarhuis (champions)
7. (Spain) Sergio Casal / (Spain) Emilio Sánchez (second round)
8. (Australia) John Fitzgerald / (Spain) Javier Sánchez (second round)

== Draw ==
=== Key ===
- Q = Qualifier
- WC = Wild card
- LL = Lucky loser
- Alt = Alternate
- SE = Special exempt
- PR = Protected ranking
- ITF = ITF entry
- JE = Junior exempt
- w/o = Walkover
- r = Retired
- d = Defaulted
- SR = Special ranking

=== Finals ===
Semifinals
(United States) Luke Jensen (United States) Murphy Jensen	2	1
(South Africa) Wayne Ferreira (Australia) Mark Kratzmann	6	6
6	(Netherlands) Jacco Eltingh (Netherlands) Paul Haarhuis	6	6
(Germany) Patrik Kühnen (Czech Republic) Cyril Suk	4	2

Final
(South Africa) Wayne Ferreira (Australia) Mark Kratzmann	4	6
6	(Netherlands) Jacco Eltingh (Netherlands) Paul Haarhuis	6	7

=== Top half ===
First round
1	(Switzerland) J Hlasek (Switzerland) M Rosset	4	6	6
(United States) L Jensen (United States) M Jensen	6	4	7
Q	(Brazil) L Mattar (Brazil) J Oncins	7	6
Q	(Spain) C Costa (Sweden) J Svensson	6	4
WC	(Italy) R Furlan (Italy) S Pescosolido	1	7	2
(South Africa) M Ondruska (United States) B Pearce	6	6	6
(South Africa) JL de Jager (Spain) F Roig	2	6
8	(Australia) J Fitzgerald (Spain) J Sánchez	6	7
4	(United States) S DeVries (Australia) D Macpherson	7	3	6
(Czech Republic) V Flégl (Denmark) M Mortensen	6	6	3
(South Africa) W Ferreira (Australia) A Kratzmann	3	7	6
(United States) M Bauer (Czech Republic) L Pimek	6	6	4
(Sweden) R Bergh (South Africa) B Talbot	6	6	6
(Netherlands) T Nijssen (South Africa) P Norval	7	3	1
WC	(United States) J Courier (United States) MV Washington	7	7
5	(Canada) G Connell (United States) P Galbraith	6	5

Second round
(United States) L Jensen (United States) M Jensen	6	7
Q	(Brazil) L Mattar (Brazil) J Oncins	2	5
(South Africa) M Ondruska (United States) B Pearce	7	6
8	(Australia) J Fitzgerald (Spain) J Sánchez	5	3
4	(United States) S DeVries (Australia) D Macpherson	3	2
(South Africa) W Ferreira (Australia) A Kratzmann	6	6
(Sweden) R Bergh (South Africa) B Talbot	6	4
WC	(United States) J Courier (United States) MV Washington	7	6

Quarterfinals
(United States) L Jensen (United States) M Jensen	6	6
(South Africa) M Ondruska (United States) B Pearce	2	2
(South Africa) W Ferreira (Australia) A Kratzmann	3	7	6
WC	(United States) J Courier (United States) MV Washington	6	6	1

Semifinals
(United States) L Jensen (United States) M Jensen	2	1
(South Africa) W Ferreira (Australia) A Kratzmann	6	6

=== Bottom half ===
First round
6	(Netherlands) J Eltingh (Netherlands) P Haarhuis	6	6
(Czech Republic) K Nováček (Germany) CU Steeb	3	4
(Argentina) H de la Peña (Mexico) J Lozano	6	7
(Netherlands) R Krajicek (Netherlands) J Siemerink	2	5
WC	(Croatia) G Ivanišević (Ukraine) A Medvedev	7	7
(United States) J Pugh (United States) G Van Emburgh	6	6
(South Africa) B Haygarth (Sweden) T Svantesson	3	4
3	(South Africa) D Visser (Australia) L Warder	6	6
7	(Spain) S Casal (Spain) E Sánchez	2	6	7
(Netherlands) M Oosting (Germany) U Riglewski	6	3	5
(Italy) O Camporese (Italy) D Nargiso	7	5	4
(United States) B Garnett (United States) TJ Middleton	6	7	6
(Netherlands) M Koevermans (Brazil) C Motta	5	3
(Germany) P Kühnen (Czech Republic) C Suk	7	6
WC	(Italy) C Brandi (Italy) C Caratti	7	6	6
2	(South Africa) D Adams (Russia) A Olhovskiy	5	7	3

Second round
6	(Netherlands) J Eltingh (Netherlands) P Haarhuis	1	6	6
(Argentina) H de la Peña (Mexico) J Lozano	6	4	2
WC	(Croatia) G Ivanišević (Ukraine) A Medvedev	6	7
3	(South Africa) D Visser (Australia) L Warder	3	6
7	(Spain) S Casal (Spain) E Sánchez	6	6	6
(United States) B Garnett (United States) TJ Middleton	4	7	7
(Germany) P Kühnen (Czech Republic) C Suk	6	6
WC	(Italy) C Brandi (Italy) C Caratti	1	4

Quarterfinals
6	(Netherlands) J Eltingh (Netherlands) P Haarhuis	7	6
WC	(Croatia) G Ivanišević (Ukraine) A Medvedev	6	4
(United States) B Garnett (United States) TJ Middleton	6	6	6
(Germany) P Kühnen (Czech Republic) C Suk	3	7	7

Semifinals
6	(Netherlands) J Eltingh (Netherlands) P Haarhuis	6	6
(Germany) P Kühnen (Czech Republic) C Suk	4	2
