= 1993 Italian Open – Women's singles =

Women's singles
- 1993 Italian Open

Final
- Champion: (Spain) Conchita Martínez
- Runner-up: (Argentina) Gabriela Sabatini
- Score: 7–5, 6–1

Details
- Draw: 56 (2WC/8Q/1LL)
- Seeds: 16

Events
| Singles | men | women |
| Doubles | men | women |
| ← 1992 · | Italian Open | · 1994 → |

Conchita Martínez defeated the two-time defending champion Gabriela Sabatini in the final, 7–5, 6–1 to win the women's singles tennis title at the 1993 Italian Open.

== Seeds ==
The first eight seeds received a bye to the second round.

1. (Spain) Arantxa Sánchez Vicario (semifinals)
2. (United States) Martina Navratilova (quarterfinals)
3. (Argentina) Gabriela Sabatini (final)
4. (United States) Mary Joe Fernández (semifinals)
5. (United States) Jennifer Capriati (quarterfinals)
6. (Spain) Conchita Martínez (champion)
7. (Czech Republic) Jana Novotná (second round)
8. (Germany) Anke Huber (quarterfinals)
9. (South Africa) Amanda Coetzer (third round)
10. (France) Nathalie Tauziat (first round)
11. (France) Mary Pierce (third round)
12. (Bulgaria) Magdalena Maleeva (second round)
13. (United States) Lori McNeil (first round)
14. (United States) Zina Garrison-Jackson (first round)
15. (Belarus) Natasha Zvereva (third round)
16. (Japan) Naoko Sawamatsu (third round)

== Draw ==
=== Key ===
- Q = Qualifier
- WC = Wild card
- LL = Lucky loser
- Alt = Alternate
- ITF = ITF entry
- PR = Protected ranking
- SR = Special ranking
- SE = Special exempt
- JE = Junior exempt
- JR = Junior Accelerator Programme entrant
- CO = College Accelerator Programme entrant
- NG = Next Gen Accelerator Program entrant
- w/o = Walkover
- r = Retired
- d = Defaulted

=== Finals ===
Quarterfinals
1 | (Spain) Arantxa Sánchez Vicario | 6 | 6
5 | (United States) Jennifer Capriati | 2 | 2
3 | (Argentina) Gabriela Sabatini | 6 | 6
Q | (Italy) Maria Francesca Bentivoglio | 1 | 1
8 | (Germany) Anke Huber | 4 | 7 | 6^{5}
4 | (United States) Mary Joe Fernández | 6 | 5 | 7^{7}
6 | (Spain) Conchita Martínez | 6 | 6
2 | (United States) Martina Navratilova | 1 | 4

Semifinals
1 | (Spain) Arantxa Sánchez Vicario | 1 | 3
3 | (Argentina) Gabriela Sabatini | 6 | 6
4 | (United States) Mary Joe Fernández | 5 | 4
6 | (Spain) Conchita Martínez | 7 | 6

Final
3 | (Argentina) Gabriela Sabatini | 5 | 1
6 | (Spain) Conchita Martínez | 7 | 6

=== Top half ===
==== Section 1 ====
First round
LL | (Paraguay) R de los Ríos | 6 | 6
(Canada) P Hy | 0 | 3
(United States) G Fernández | 7^{7} | 2 | 6
(Germany) S Frankl | 6^{2} | 6 | 3
(Netherlands) B Schultz | 6 | 6
14 | (United States) Z Garrison-Jackson | 4 | 2
9 | (South Africa) A Coetzer | 6 | 6
(Slovakia) R Zrubáková | 4 | 1
Q | (United States) J Emmons | 3 | 0
Q | (United States) K Adams | 6 | 6
(Australia) R McQuillan | 1 | 3
(Italy) S Cecchini | 6 | 6

Second round
1 | (Spain) A Sánchez Vicario | 6 | 6
LL | (Paraguay) R de los Ríos | 2 | 0
(United States) G Fernández | 4 | 2
(Netherlands) B Schultz | 6 | 6
9 | (South Africa) A Coetzer | 6 | 7
Q | (United States) K Adams | 4 | 5
(Italy) S Cecchini | 3 | 2
5 | (United States) J Capriati | 6 | 6

Third round
1 | (Spain) A Sánchez Vicario | 6 | 6
(Netherlands) B Schultz | 4 | 0
9 | (South Africa) A Coetzer | 6^{6} | 6 | 2
5 | (United States) J Capriati | 7^{8} | 4 | 6

Quarterfinals
1 | (Spain) A Sánchez Vicario | 6 | 6
5 | (United States) J Capriati | 2 | 2

==== Section 2 ====
First round
Q | (Netherlands) C Wegink | 5 | 6 | 7^{11}
(France) S Testud | 7 | 4 | 6^{9}
(Finland) N Dahlman | 2 | 3
(France) N van Lottum | 6 | 6
(Italy) G Pizzichini | 6^{3} | 1
12 | (Bulgaria) M Maleeva | 7^{7} | 6
15 | (Belarus) N Zvereva | 6 | 7
Q | (Austria) S Dopfer | 2 | 5
(Hungary) A Temesvári | 6 | 6
Pr. | (Greece) C Papadáki | 1 | 0
(Netherlands) M Bollegraf | 2 | 4
Q | (Italy) MF Bentivoglio | 6 | 6

Second round
3 | (Argentina) G Sabatini | 6 | 6
Q | (Netherlands) C Wegink | 0 | 2
(France) N van Lottum | 6 | 2 | 6
12 | (Bulgaria) M Maleeva | 3 | 6 | 3
15 | (Belarus) N Zvereva | 6 | 6
(Hungary) A Temesvári | 2 | 2
Q | (Italy) MF Bentivoglio | 7 | 7^{7}
7 | (Czech Republic) J Novotná | 5 | 6^{5}

Third round
3 | (Argentina) G Sabatini | 6 | 7^{8}
(France) N van Lottum | 0 | 6^{6}
15 | (Belarus) N Zvereva | 5 | 7 | 4
Q | (Italy) MF Bentivoglio | 7 | 5 | 6

Quarterfinals
3 | (Argentina) G Sabatini | 6 | 6
Q | (Italy) MF Bentivoglio | 1 | 1

| Preliminary Match |
| (Greece) C Papadáki | 3 | 6 | 7 |
| (Italy) F Romano | 6 | 4 | 5 |

=== Bottom half ===
==== Section 3 ====
First round
(Italy) L Ferrando | 2 | 6 | 6
(United States) C Cunningham | 6 | 2 | 4
(Argentina) I Gorrochategui | 6 | 6
(Italy) N Baudone | 4 | 4
(Croatia) I Majoli | 6 | 6
10 | (France) N Tauziat | 1 | 2
11 | (France) M Pierce | 6 | 7
(United States) S Stafford | 4 | 5
WC | (Italy) F Perfetti | 3 | 2
Q | (Italy) E Savoldi | 6 | 6
WC | (Italy) L Golarsa | 7^{7} | 4 | 6^{6}
(South Africa) J Kruger | 6^{4} | 6 | 7^{8}

Second round
8 | (Germany) A Huber | 7 | 6
(Italy) L Ferrando | 5 | 2
(Argentina) I Gorrochategui | 6 | 4 | 7^{7}
(Croatia) I Majoli | 3 | 6 | 6^{5}
11 | (France) M Pierce | 6 | 6
Q | (Italy) E Savoldi | 0 | 1
(South Africa) J Kruger | 2 | 1
4 | (United States) MJ Fernández | 6 | 6

Third round
8 | (Germany) A Huber | 1 | 6 | 6
(Argentina) I Gorrochategui | 6 | 2 | 0
11 | (France) M Pierce | 6^{3} | 6^{3}
4 | (United States) MJ Fernández | 7^{7} | 7^{7}

Quarterfinals
8 | (Germany) A Huber | 4 | 7 | 6^{5}
4 | (United States) MJ Fernández | 6 | 5 | 7^{7}

==== Section 4 ====
First round
(Italy) K Piccolini | 3 | 0
(Germany) M Živec-Škulj | 6 | 6
Q | (France) N Herreman | 4 | 6 | 6
Q | (Brazil) A Vieira | 6 | 4 | 2
(Italy) S Farina | 5 | 6 | 6
13 | (United States) L McNeil | 7 | 2 | 2
16 | (Japan) N Sawamatsu | 6 | 6
(Argentina) B Fulco-Villella | 3 | 4
(Czech Republic) K Kroupová | 6 | 6
(France) I Demongeot | 2 | 3
(United States) D Graham | 6 | 6
(Italy) F Bonsignori | 3 | 4

Second round
6 | (Spain) C Martínez | 7^{7} | 6
(Germany) M Živec-Škulj | 6^{5} | 3
Q | (France) N Herreman | 6 | 6
(Italy) S Farina | 2 | 0
16 | (Japan) N Sawamatsu | 6 | 6
(Czech Republic) K Kroupová | 1 | 2
(United States) D Graham | 0 | 4
2 | (United States) M Navratilova | 6 | 6

Third round
6 | (Spain) C Martínez | 6 | 6
Q | (France) N Herreman | 1 | 0
16 | (Japan) N Sawamatsu | 4 | 4
2 | (United States) M Navratilova | 6 | 6

Quarterfinals
6 | (Spain) C Martínez | 6 | 6
2 | (United States) M Navratilova | 1 | 4
