= 1993 Italian Open (tennis) =

1993 tennis tournament in Rome, Italy

- Date: 3–9 May (women); 10–17 May (men)
- Edition: 50th
- Prize money: $1,500,000 (men) $750,000 (women)
- Surface: Clay / outdoor
- Location: Rome, Italy
- Venue: Foro Italico

Champions

Men's singles
- (United States) Jim Courier

Women's singles
- (Spain) Conchita Martínez

Men's doubles
- (Netherlands) Jacco Eltingh / (Netherlands) Paul Haarhuis

Women's doubles
- (Czech Republic) Jana Novotná / (Spain) Arantxa Sánchez Vicario
← 1992 ·	Italian Open	· 1994 →

The 1993 Italian Open was a tennis tournament held in 1993. It was the 50th edition of the Italian Open tennis tournament, and it was part of the Tier I Series of the 1993 WTA Tour and the ATP Super 9 of the 1993 ATP Tour. Both the men's and the women's events took place at the Foro Italico in Rome, Italy. The women's tournament was held from 3 May through 9 May 1993 and the men's tournament was held from 10 May through 17 May 1993. Second-seeded Jim Courier and sixth-seeded Conchita Martínez won the singles titles. It was Courier's second consecutive title at the event, also winning in 1992.

== Finals ==
=== Men's singles ===
(United States) Jim Courier defeated (Croatia) Goran Ivanišević, 6–1, 6–2, 6–2

- It was Courier's 4th singles title of the year and the 13th of his career.

=== Women's singles ===
(Spain) Conchita Martínez defeated (Argentina) Gabriela Sabatini, 7–5, 6–1

- It was Martínez' 3rd singles title of the year and her 14th of her career.

=== Men's doubles ===
(Netherlands) Jacco Eltingh / (Netherlands) Paul Haarhuis defeated (South Africa) Wayne Ferreira / (Australia) Mark Kratzmann, 6–4, 7–6

=== Women's doubles ===
(Czech Republic) Jana Novotná / (Spain) Arantxa Sánchez Vicario defeated (United States) Mary Joe Fernández / (United States) Zina Garrison-Jackson, 6–4, 6–2
