= 1993 Italian Open – Women's doubles =

Women's doubles
- 1993 Italian Open

Final
- Champions: (Czech Republic) Jana Novotná; (Spain) Arantxa Sánchez Vicario
- Runners-up: (United States) Mary Joe Fernández; (United States) Zina Garrison-Jackson
- Score: 6–4, 6–2

Details
- Draw: 28
- Seeds: 8

Events
Singles	men	women
Doubles	men	women
← 1992 ·	Italian Open	· 1994 →

Monica Seles and Helena Suková were the defending champions, but none competed this year. Seles was unable to compete after being stabbed in the back in Hamburg only one week earlier.

Jana Novotná and Arantxa Sánchez Vicario won the title by defeating Mary Joe Fernández and Zina Garrison-Jackson 6–4, 6–2 in the final.

== Seeds ==
The first four seeds received a bye to the second round.

1. (United States) Gigi Fernández / (Belarus) Natasha Zvereva (quarterfinals)
2. (Czech Republic) Jana Novotná / (Spain) Arantxa Sánchez Vicario (champions)
3. (United States) Lori McNeil / (Australia) Rennae Stubbs (semifinal)
4. (United States) Mary Joe Fernández / (United States) Zina Garrison-Jackson (final)
5. (United States) Katrina Adams / (Netherlands) Manon Bollegraf (quarterfinals)
6. (South Africa) Amanda Coetzer / (Argentina) Inés Gorrochategui (quarterfinals)
7. (United States) Sandy Collins / (Australia) Rachel McQuillan (second round)
8. (Bulgaria) Katerina Maleeva / (France) Nathalie Tauziat (second round)

== Draw ==
=== Key ===
- Q = Qualifier
- WC = Wild card
- LL = Lucky loser
- Alt = Alternate
- ITF = ITF entry
- PR = Protected ranking
- SR = Special ranking
- SE = Special exempt
- JE = Junior exempt
- JR = Junior Accelerator Programme entrant
- CO = College Accelerator Programme entrant
- NG = Next Gen Accelerator Program entrant
- w/o = Walkover
- r = Retired
- d = Defaulted

=== Finals ===
Semifinals

Final

- (Italy) Silvia Farina
- (Italy) Linda Ferrando
1
4

4
(United States) Mary Joe Fernández
(United States) Zina Garrison-Jackson
6
6

4
- (United States) Mary Joe Fernández
- (United States) Zina Garrison-Jackson
4
2

2
(Czech Republic) Jana Novotná
(Spain) Arantxa Sánchez Vicario
6
6

3
- (United States) Lori McNeil
- (Australia) Rennae Stubbs
3
1

2
(Czech Republic) Jana Novotná
(Spain) Arantxa Sánchez Vicario
6
6

=== Top half ===
First round

Second round

Quarterfinals

Semifinals

1
(United States) G Fernández
(Belarus) N Zvereva
6
6

(Australia) L Pleming
(France) S Testud
7^{8}
6

- (Australia) L Pleming
- (France) S Testud
0
0

- (Australia) JA Faull
- (Australia) N Pratt
6^{6}
2

1
- (United States) G Fernández
- (Belarus) N Zvereva
6
4
4

(Italy) S Farina
(Italy) L Ferrando
6^{8}
6
7^{10}

(Italy) S Farina
(Italy) L Ferrando
2
6
6

- (Germany) A Huber
- (Canada) P Hy
7^{10}
3
6^{8}

(Italy) S Farina
(Italy) L Ferrando
1
6
6

- (Australia) K Godridge
- (Sweden) M Lindström
4
6^{2}

8
- (Bulgaria) K Maleeva
- (France) N Tauziat
6
3
1

8
(Bulgaria) K Maleeva
(France) N Tauziat
6
7^{7}

- (Italy) S Farina
- (Italy) L Ferrando
1
4

4
(United States) MJ Fernández
(United States) Z Garrison-Jackson
6
6

4
(United States) MJ Fernández
(United States) Z Garrison-Jackson
6^{9}
6
6

- (Slovakia) K Habšudová
- (Slovakia) R Zrubáková
4
5

- (United States) S Stafford
- (Hungary) A Temesvári
7^{11}
2
3

(United States) S Stafford
(Hungary) A Temesvári
6
7

4
(United States) MJ Fernández
(United States) Z Garrison-Jackson
6
6

(United States) J Fuchs
(Sweden) M Strandlund
6
6

6
- (South Africa) A Coetzer
- (Argentina) I Gorrochategui
2
3

Q
- (Italy) S Attili
- (Italy) E Savoldi
4
4

- (United States) J Fuchs
- (Sweden) M Strandlund
4
2

- (Italy) S Cecchini
- (Italy) L Garrone
4
1

6
(South Africa) A Coetzer
(Argentina) I Gorrochategui
6
6

6
(South Africa) A Coetzer
(Argentina) I Gorrochategui
6
6

=== Bottom half ===
First round

Second round

Quarterfinals

Semifinals

5
(United States) K Adams
(Netherlands) M Bollegraf
6
4
6

- (United States) J Capriati
- (Argentina) P Tarabini
4
6
4

5
(United States) K Adams
(Netherlands) M Bollegraf
3
6
6

- (United States) J Emmons
- (United States) P O'Reilly
1
0

- (United States) D Graham
- (Netherlands) B Schultz
6
3
4

(United States) D Graham
(Netherlands) B Schultz
6
6

5
- (United States) K Adams
- (Netherlands) M Bollegraf
1
6
1

WC
- (Italy) L Golarsa
- (Croatia) I Majoli
2
6^{4}

3
(United States) L McNeil
(Australia) R Stubbs
6
3
6

(Austria) S Dopfer
(Germany) M Živec-Škulj
6
7^{7}

- (Austria) S Dopfer
- (Germany) M Živec-Škulj
6
4
2

3
(United States) L McNeil
(Australia) R Stubbs
3
6
6

3
- (United States) L McNeil
- (Australia) R Stubbs
3
1

7
(United States) S Collins
(Australia) R McQuillan
6
3
7

2
(Czech Republic) J Novotná
(Spain) A Sánchez Vicario
6
6

- (France) I Demongeot
- (France) C Suire
3
6
5

7
- (United States) S Collins
- (Australia) R McQuillan
2
4

- (Czech Republic) K Kroupová
- (Bulgaria) E Pampoulova
4
3

(Austria) P Ritter
(France) N van Lottum
6
6

(Austria) P Ritter
(France) N van Lottum
6
6

- (Austria) P Ritter
- (France) N van Lottum
0
5

WC
- (Italy) R Grande
- (Italy) F Romano
3
2

2
(Czech Republic) J Novotná
(Spain) A Sánchez Vicario
6
7

(Finland) N Dahlman
(Japan) E Iida
6
6

- (Finland) N Dahlman
- (Japan) E Iida
0
2

2
(Czech Republic) J Novotná
(Spain) A Sánchez Vicario
6
6
