= 1994 Italian Open – Women's singles =

Women's singles
- 1994 Italian Open

Final
- Champion: (Spain) Conchita Martínez
- Runner-up: (United States) Martina Navratilova
- Score: 7–6^{(7–5)}, 6–4

Details
- Draw: 56 (3WC/8Q/3LL)
- Seeds: 16

Events
Singles	men	women
Doubles	men	women
← 1993 ·	Italian Open	· 1995 →

Defending champion Conchita Martínez defeated Martina Navratilova in the final, 7–6^{(7–5)}, 6–4 to win the women's singles tennis title at the 1994 Italian Open.

== Seeds ==
The first eight seeds received a bye to the second round.

1. (Spain) Conchita Martínez (champion)
2. (United States) Martina Navratilova (final)
3. (Argentina) Gabriela Sabatini (second round)
4. (Germany) Anke Huber (second round)
5. (France) Mary Pierce (third round)
6. (South Africa) Amanda Coetzer (second round)
7. (Japan) Naoko Sawamatsu (quarterfinals)
8. (France) Nathalie Tauziat (quarterfinals)
9. (Austria) Judith Wiesner (quarterfinals)
10. (Netherlands) Brenda Schultz (third round)
11. (Georgia (country)) ~~Leila Meskhi~~ (withdrew)
12. (Italy) Linda Ferrando (first round)
13. (United States) Ann Grossman (third round)
14. (United States) Sandra Cacic (second round)
15. (Germany) Meike Babel (first round)
16. (Netherlands) Miriam Oremans (first round)

== Draw ==
=== Key ===
- Q = Qualifier
- WC = Wild card
- LL = Lucky loser
- Alt = Alternate
- ITF = ITF entry
- PR = Protected ranking
- SR = Special ranking
- SE = Special exempt
- JE = Junior exempt
- JR = Junior Accelerator Programme entrant
- CO = College Accelerator Programme entrant
- NG = Next Gen Accelerator Program entrant
- w/o = Walkover
- r = Retired
- d = Defaulted

=== Finals ===
Quarterfinals
1	(Spain) Conchita Martínez	6	6
8	(France) Nathalie Tauziat	4	4
Q	(Italy) Adriana Serra Zanetti	3	2
Q	(Slovakia) Karina Habšudová	6	6
9	(Austria) Judith Wiesner	0	6	3
(Romania) Irina Spîrlea	6	4	6
7	(Japan) Naoko Sawamatsu	2	5
2	(United States) Martina Navratilova	6	7

Semifinals
1	(Spain) Conchita Martínez	6	6
Q	(Slovakia) Karina Habšudová	1	2
(Romania) Irina Spîrlea	2	3
2	(United States) Martina Navratilova	6	6

Final
1	(Spain) Conchita Martínez	7^{7}	6
2	(United States) Martina Navratilova	6^{5}	4

=== Top half ===
==== Section 1 ====
First round
(Slovakia) J Husárová	4	2
Q	(Hungary) A Temesvári	6	6
WC	(Italy) N Baudone	6	7
LL	(Italy) M Grossi	3	5
(Argentina) P Tarabini	1	6	7^{7}
12	(Italy) L Ferrando	6	4	6^{2}
14	(United States) S Cacic	6	6
(Belgium) D Monami	1	2
(Italy) S Cecchini	6	6
(United States) G Fernández	0	1
(Germany) S Frankl	4	6	2
WC	(Italy) E Savoldi	6	3	6

Second round
1	(Spain) C Martínez	6	6
Q	(Hungary) A Temesvári	2	0
WC	(Italy) N Baudone	6	3	1
(Argentina) P Tarabini	2	6	6
14	(United States) S Cacic	4	2
(Italy) S Cecchini	6	6
WC	(Italy) E Savoldi	1	2
8	(France) N Tauziat	6	6

Third round
1	(Spain) C Martínez	6	6
(Argentina) P Tarabini	1	1
(Italy) S Cecchini	4	2
8	(France) N Tauziat	6	6

Quarterfinals
1	(Spain) C Martínez	6	6
8	(France) N Tauziat	4	4

==== Section 2 ====
First round
Q	(Italy) Ad Serra Zanetti	6	6
(Austria) S Dopfer	2	2
(Romania) R Dragomir	1	4
(United States) S Stafford	6	6
(Italy) S Farina	4	4
10	(Netherlands) B Schultz	6	6
16	(Netherlands) M Oremans	6^{4}	4
Q	(Italy) F Fortuni	7^{7}	6
(Czech Republic) K Kroupová	7	1	0
Q	(Slovakia) K Habšudová	5	6	6
(Italy) MF Bentivoglio	2	3
Q	(Slovenia) B Mulej	6	6

Second round
4	(Germany) A Huber	6	3	3
Q	(Italy) Ad Serra Zanetti	2	6	6
(United States) S Stafford	1	3
10	(Netherlands) B Schultz	6	6
Q	(Italy) F Fortuni	4	3
Q	(Slovakia) K Habšudová	6	6
Q	(Slovenia) B Mulej	2	2
5	(France) M Pierce	6	6

Third round
Q	(Italy) Ad Serra Zanetti	6	6
10	(Netherlands) B Schultz	2	1
Q	(Slovakia) K Habšudová	6	6
5	(France) M Pierce	2	3

Quarterfinals
Q	(Italy) Ad Serra Zanetti	3	2
Q	(Slovakia) K Habšudová	6	6

=== Bottom half ===
==== Section 3 ====
First round
WC	(Italy) R Grande	4	1
Q	(Slovakia) R Zrubáková	6	6
(Argentina) MJ Gaidano	6	6^{2}	2
(Netherlands) N Muns-Jagerman	3	7^{7}	6
(Germany) V Martinek	2	4
9	(Austria) J Wiesner	6	6
15	(Germany) M Babel	6^{5}	1
(South Africa) J Kruger	7^{7}	6
(United States) K Po	5	6	2
Q	(Netherlands) C Wegink	7	4	6
(Romania) I Spîrlea	6	6
(Russia) E Maniokova	3	0

Second round
6	(South Africa) A Coetzer	0	5
Q	(Slovakia) R Zrubáková	6	7
(Netherlands) N Muns-Jagerman	5	1
9	(Austria) J Wiesner	7	6
(South Africa) J Kruger	7	6
Q	(Netherlands) C Wegink	5	2
(Romania) I Spîrlea	6	6
3	(Argentina) G Sabatini	4	3

Third round
Q	(Slovakia) R Zrubáková	6	4	3
9	(Austria) J Wiesner	3	6	6
(South Africa) J Kruger	6	3	1
(Romania) I Spîrlea	4	6	6

Quarterfinals
9	(Austria) J Wiesner	0	6	3
(Romania) I Spîrlea	6	4	6

==== Section 4 ====
First round
(Netherlands) K Boogert	6	6
(Austria) B Reinstadler	2	0
(Italy) L Golarsa	6	6
LL	(Argentina) M Paz	4	2
(United Kingdom) C Wood	1	1
13	(United States) A Grossman	6	6
LL	(Spain) N Ávila	5	4
(Argentina) I Gorrochategui	7	6
(France) K Quentrec	6^{4}	6	6
(Sweden) Å Carlsson	7^{7}	1	4
Q	(Czech Republic) L Richterová	6	6
(Czech Republic) R Bobková	4	4

Second round
7	(Japan) N Sawamatsu	4	6	6
(Netherlands) K Boogert	6	3	4
(Italy) L Golarsa	6	1	2
13	(United States) A Grossman	3	6	6
(Argentina) I Gorrochategui	6	6
(France) K Quentrec	3	0
Q	(Czech Republic) L Richterová	2	1
2	(United States) M Navratilova	6	6

Third round
7	(Japan) N Sawamatsu	6	6
13	(United States) A Grossman	3	3
(Argentina) I Gorrochategui	2	6	4
2	(United States) M Navratilova	6	3	6

Quarterfinals
7	(Japan) N Sawamatsu	2	5
2	(United States) M Navratilova	6	7
