= 1994 Italian Open – Women's doubles =

Women's doubles
- 1994 Italian Open

Final
- Champions: (United States) Gigi Fernández (Belarus) Natasha Zvereva
- Runners-up: (Argentina) Gabriela Sabatini (Netherlands) Brenda Schultz
- Score: 6–1, 6–3

Details
- Draw: 28
- Seeds: 8

Events
Singles	men	women
Doubles	men	women
← 1993 ·	Italian Open	· 1995 →

Jana Novotná and Arantxa Sánchez Vicario were the defending champions, but none competed this year.

Gigi Fernández and Natasha Zvereva won the title by defeating Gabriela Sabatini and Brenda Schultz 6–1, 6–3 in the final.

== Seeds ==
The first four seeds received a bye to the second round.

1. (United States) Gigi Fernández / (Belarus) Natasha Zvereva (champions)
2. (Latvia) Larisa Neiland / (Australia) Rennae Stubbs (quarterfinals)
3. (United States) Katrina Adams / (Netherlands) Manon Bollegraf (quarterfinals)
4. (South Africa) Amanda Coetzer / (Argentina) Inés Gorrochategui (quarterfinals)
5. (Italy) Sandra Cecchini / (Argentina) Patricia Tarabini (semifinals)
6. (Canada) Jill Hetherington / (United States) Shaun Stafford (second round)
7. (Italy) Laura Golarsa / (Argentina) Mercedes Paz (first round)
8. (France) Mary Pierce / (Hungary) Andrea Temesvári (first round)

== Draw ==
=== Key ===
- Q = Qualifier
- WC = Wild card
- LL = Lucky loser
- Alt = Alternate
- ITF = ITF entry
- PR = Protected ranking
- SR = Special ranking
- SE = Special exempt
- JE = Junior exempt
- JR = Junior Accelerator Programme entrant
- CO = College Accelerator Programme entrant
- NG = Next Gen Accelerator Program entrant
- w/o = Walkover
- r = Retired
- d = Defaulted

=== Finals ===
Semifinals
1	(United States) Gigi Fernández (Belarus) Natasha Zvereva	2	6	6
6	(Italy) Sandra Cecchini (Argentina) Patricia Tarabini	6	2	2
(Argentina) Gabriela Sabatini (Netherlands) Brenda Schultz	6	4	7
(France) Julie Halard (France) Nathalie Tauziat	4	6	5

Final
1	(United States) Gigi Fernández (Belarus) Natasha Zvereva	6	6
(Argentina) Gabriela Sabatini (Netherlands) Brenda Schultz	1	3

=== Top half ===
First round
(Czech Republic) R Bobková (Slovakia) J Husárová	0	3
(United States) A Grossman (United States) K Po	6	6
(Spain) C Martínez (Austria) J Wiesner	7^{7}	6^{4}	5
(Netherlands) K Boogert (Netherlands) N Muns-Jagerman	6^{5}	7^{7}	7
(Germany) A Huber (Netherlands) M Oremans	6	6
7	(Italy) L Golarsa (Argentina) M Paz	4	4
(Italy) N Baudone (Italy) M Grossi	2	0
LL	(United States) C Benjamin (Romania) R Dragomir	6	6
(Argentina) MJ Gaidano (Belgium) D Monami	7^{8}	2	2
(Finland) N Dahlman (Australia) JA Faull	6^{6}	6	6
(Argentina) B Fulco-Villella (Canada) P Hy	4	4
6	(Italy) S Cecchini (Argentina) P Tarabini	6	6

Second round
1	(United States) G Fernández (Belarus) N Zvereva	6	6
(United States) A Grossman (United States) K Po	3	4
(Netherlands) K Boogert (Netherlands) N Muns-Jagerman	4	4
(Germany) A Huber (Netherlands) M Oremans	6	6
4	(South Africa) A Coetzer (Argentina) I Gorrochategui	6	6
LL	(United States) C Benjamin (Romania) R Dragomir	3	0
(Finland) N Dahlman (Australia) JA Faull	2	6^{2}
6	(Italy) S Cecchini (Argentina) P Tarabini	6	7^{7}

Quarterfinals
1	(United States) G Fernández (Belarus) N Zvereva	6	6
(Germany) A Huber (Netherlands) M Oremans	3	4
4	(South Africa) A Coetzer (Argentina) I Gorrochategui	3	4
6	(Italy) S Cecchini (Argentina) P Tarabini	6	6

Semifinals
1	(United States) G Fernández (Belarus) N Zvereva	2	6	6
6	(Italy) S Cecchini (Argentina) P Tarabini	6	2	2

=== Bottom half ===
First round
8	(France) M Pierce (Hungary) A Temesvári	1	2
(Argentina) G Sabatini (Netherlands) B Schultz	6	6
(United Kingdom) V Lake (United Kingdom) C Wood	2	6	7^{9}
(Germany) M Babel (Sweden) Å Carlsson	6	3	6^{7}
(Italy) S Farina (Italy) L Ferrando	6	6
WC	(Italy) L Garrone (Italy) R Grande	3	2
6	(Canada) J Hetherington (United States) S Stafford	7^{7}	6
(Croatia) M Murić (Finland) P Thorén	6^{5}	3
(France) J Halard (France) N Tauziat	6	6
Q	(Italy) Ad Serra Zanetti (Italy) MP Zavagli	2	4
(Slovakia) K Habšudová (Slovakia) R Zrubáková	6	6
WC	(Italy) S Attili (Italy) E Savoldi	0	4

Second round
(Argentina) G Sabatini (Netherlands) B Schultz	6	6
(United Kingdom) V Lake (United Kingdom) C Wood	3	3
(Italy) S Farina (Italy) L Ferrando	6^{6}	4
3	(United States) K Adams (Netherlands) M Bollegraf	7^{8}	6
6	(Canada) J Hetherington (United States) S Stafford	3	4
(France) J Halard (France) N Tauziat	6	6
(Slovakia) K Habšudová (Slovakia) R Zrubáková	2	2
2	(Latvia) L Neiland (Australia) R Stubbs	6	6

Quarterfinals
(Argentina) G Sabatini (Netherlands) B Schultz	6	7^{7}
3	(United States) K Adams (Netherlands) M Bollegraf	1	6^{2}
(France) J Halard (France) N Tauziat	6	7^{7}
2	(Latvia) L Neiland (Australia) R Stubbs	3	6^{5}

Semifinals
(Argentina) G Sabatini (Netherlands) B Schultz	6	4	7
(France) J Halard (France) N Tauziat	4	6	5
