= 1994 WTA German Open – Doubles =

Doubles
- 1994 WTA German Open

Final
- Champions: (United States) Gigi Fernández; (Belarus) Natalia Zvereva
- Runners-up: (United States) Debbie Graham; (Netherlands) Brenda Schultz
- Score: 6–1, 6–3

Details
- Draw: 28 (1 Q / 2 WC)
- Seeds: 8

Events
Singles	Doubles
← 1993 ·	WTA German Open	· 1995 →

Gigi Fernández and Natalia Zvereva were the defending champions and successfully defended their title, defeating Debbie Graham and Brenda Schultz in the final, 6–1, 6–3.

== Seeds ==
All seeds received a bye to the second round.

1. (United States) Gigi Fernández / (Belarus) Natalia Zvereva (champions)
2. (Czech Republic) Jana Novotná / (Spain) Arantxa Sánchez Vicario (final)
3. (Latvia) Larisa Savchenko-Neiland / (Australia) Rennae Stubbs (semifinal)
4. (United States) Katrina Adams / (Netherlands) Manon Bollegraf (semifinal)
5. (Italy) Sandra Cecchini / (Argentina) Patricia Tarabini (quarterfinal)
6. (Canada) Jill Hetherington / (United States) Shaun Stafford (quarterfinal)
7. (Argentina) Mercedes Paz / (Netherlands) Brenda Schultz (first round)
8. (France) Julie Halard / (France) Nathalie Tauziat (quarterfinal)

== Draw ==
=== Key ===
- Q = Qualifier
- WC = Wild card
- LL = Lucky loser
- Alt = Alternate
- SE = Special exempt
- PR = Protected ranking
- ITF = ITF entry
- JE = Junior exempt
- w/o = Walkover
- r = Retired
- d = Defaulted
- SR = Special ranking

=== Finals ===
Semifinals

Final

1
(United States) Gigi Fernández
(Belarus) Natalia Zvereva
6
6

4
- (United States) Katrina Adams
- (Netherlands) Manon Bollegraf
2
3

1
(United States) Gigi Fernández
(Belarus) Natalia Zvereva
6
7

2
- (Czech Republic) Jana Novotná
- (Spain) Arantxa Sánchez Vicario
3
6

3
- (Latvia) Larisa Savchenko-Neiland
- (Australia) Rennae Stubbs
1
4

2
(Czech Republic) Jana Novotná
(Spain) Arantxa Sánchez Vicario
6
6

=== Top half ===
First round

Second round

Quarterfinals

Semifinals

1
(United States) G Fernández
(Belarus) N Zvereva
6
6

- (United States) T Austin
- (France) M Pierce
1
4

- (United States) A Grossman
- (United States) K Po
4
1

(United States) A Grossman
(United States) K Po
6
6

1
(United States) G Fernández
(Belarus) N Zvereva
6
2
6

Q
(Belarus) T Ignatieva
(United States) A Mall
0
6
6

6
- (Canada) J Hetherington
- (United States) S Stafford
3
6
3

WC
- (Germany) K Freye
- (Germany) S Meier
6
4
1

Q
- (Belarus) T Ignatieva
- (United States) A Mall
4
3

- (Kazakhstan) E Likhovtseva
- (Slovakia) R Zrubáková
2
6
3

6
(Canada) J Hetherington
(United States) S Stafford
6
6

6
(Canada) J Hetherington
(United States) S Stafford
6
3
6

1
(United States) Gigi Fernández
(Belarus) Natalia Zvereva
6
6

4
- (United States) Katrina Adams
- (Netherlands) Manon Bollegraf
2
3

4
(United States) K Adams
(Netherlands) M Bollegraf
6
1
6

- (Argentina) M Gaidano
- (Brazil) A Vieira
4
7
5

- (United Kingdom) V Lake
- (United Kingdom) C Wood
3
6
1

(United Kingdom) V Lake
(United Kingdom) C Wood
6
5
7

4
(United States) K Adams
(Netherlands) M Bollegraf
3
6
6

(West Germany) A Huber
(Germany) B Rittner
7
7

- (Ukraine) O Lugina
- (Bulgaria) E Pampoulova
6
2
3

- (Australia) J Faull
- (South Africa) T Price
6
5

- (West Germany) A Huber
- (Germany) B Rittner
3
4

(Ukraine) O Lugina
(Bulgaria) E Pampoulova
6
7

(Ukraine) O Lugina
(Bulgaria) E Pampoulova
6
6

7
- (Argentina) M Paz
- (Netherlands) B Schultz
3
5

=== Bottom half ===
First round

Second round

Quarterfinals

Semifinals

8
(France) J Halard
(France) N Tauziat
6
6

- (Australia) J Byrne
- (Australia) K Guse
4
3

8
(France) J Halard
(France) N Tauziat
4
6
6

(Netherlands) N Krijger-Jagerman
(Austria) P Ritter
6
6

- (Netherlands) N Krijger-Jagerman
- (Austria) P Ritter
6
3
1

WC
- (Germany) N Nittinger
- (Germany) S Schmidle
3
1

8
- (France) J Halard
- (France) N Tauziat
2
3

- (Germany) M Babel
- (Netherlands) C Vis
6
2
5

3
(Latvia) L Savchenko-Neiland
(Australia) R Stubbs
6
6

(Argentina) B Fulco-Villella
(Spain) V Ruano Pascual
0
6
7

- (Argentina) B Fulco-Villella
- (Spain) V Ruano Pascual
3
2

3
(Latvia) L Savchenko-Neiland
(Australia) R Stubbs
6
6

3
- (Latvia) Larisa Savchenko-Neiland
- (Australia) Rennae Stubbs
1
4

5
(Italy) S Cecchini
(Argentina) P Tarabini
7
6

2
(Czech Republic) Jana Novotná
(Spain) Arantxa Sánchez Vicario
6
6

- (Czech Republic) K Peschke
- (Netherlands) S Noorlander
6
1

5
(Italy) S Cecchini
(Argentina) P Tarabini
6
6

(United States) C Benjamin
(France) S Testud
0

- (United States) C Benjamin
- (France) S Testud
1
3

- (Canada) P Hy
- (Croatia) M Murić
0^{d}

5
- (Italy) S Cecchini
- (Argentina) P Tarabini
1
5

(Argentina) I Gorrochategui
(Argentina) G Sabatini
6
3
6

2
(Czech Republic) J Novotná
(Spain) A Sánchez Vicario
6
7

- (Italy) S Farina
- (United States) G Helgeson-Nielsen
2
6
4

- (Argentina) I Gorrochategui
- (Argentina) G Sabatini
4
2

2
(Czech Republic) J Novotná
(Spain) A Sánchez Vicario
6
6
