= 1994 Italian Open (tennis) =

- Date: 2–8 May (women); 9–16 May (men)
- Edition: 51st
- Prize money: $1,750,000 (men) $750,000 (women)
- Surface: Clay / outdoor
- Location: Rome, Italy
- Venue: Foro Italico

Champions

Men's singles
- (United States) Pete Sampras

Women's singles
- (Spain) Conchita Martínez

Men's doubles
- (Russia) Yevgeny Kafelnikov / (Czech Republic) David Rikl

Women's doubles
- (United States) Gigi Fernández / (Belarus) Natalia Zvereva
← 1993 ·	Italian Open	· 1995 →

The 1994 Italian Open was a tennis tournament played on outdoor clay courts. It was the 51st edition of the Italian Open, and was part of the ATP Super 9 of the 1994 ATP Tour, and of the Tier I Series of the 1994 WTA Tour. Both the men's and the women's events took place at the Foro Italico in Rome, Italy. The women's tournament was played from 2 May through 8 May 1994, and the men's tournament was played from 9 May through 16 May 1994. Pete Sampras and Conchita Martínez, both seeded first, won the singles titiles. It was Martínez' second consecutive title at the event, also winning in 1993.

== Finals ==
=== Men's singles ===
(United States) Pete Sampras defeated (Germany) Boris Becker, 6–1, 6–2, 6–2

- It was Sampras' 7th singles title of the year and the 28th of his career.

=== Women's singles ===
(Spain) Conchita Martínez defeated (United States) Martina Navratilova, 7–6, 6–4

- It was Martinez's 2nd singles title of the year and her 18th of her career.

=== Men's doubles ===
(Russia) Yevgeny Kafelnikov / (Czech Republic) David Rikl defeated (South Africa) Wayne Ferreira / (Spain) Javier Sánchez, 6–1, 7–5

=== Women's doubles ===
(United States) Gigi Fernández / (Belarus) Natasha Zvereva defeated (Argentina) Gabriela Sabatini / (Netherlands) Brenda Schultz, 6–1, 6–3
