= 1994 WTA German Open =

- Date: 9–15 May
- Edition: 83rd
- Category: Tier I
- Draw: 56S / 28D
- Prize money: $750,000
- Surface: Clay / outdoor
- Location: Berlin, Germany
- Venue: Rot-Weiss Tennis Club

Champions

Singles
- (Germany) Steffi Graf

Doubles
- (United States) Gigi Fernández / (Belarus) Natalia Zvereva
- WTA German Open

The 1994 WTA German Open was a professional women's tennis tournament played on outdoor clay courts in Berlin, Germany. It was part of the Tier I category of the 1994 WTA Tour. It was the 83rd edition of the tournament and was held from 9 May through 15 May 1994. First-seeded Steffi Graf won the singles title and earned $150,000 first-prize money.

== Finals ==
=== Singles ===
(Germany) Steffi Graf defeated (Netherlands) Brenda Schultz 7–6^{(8–6)}, 6–4

=== Doubles ===
(United States) Gigi Fernández / (Belarus) Natalia Zvereva defeated (United States) Debbie Graham / (Netherlands) Brenda Schultz 6–1, 6–3

== Prize money ==
Event	W	F	SF	QF	Round of 16	Round of 32	Round of 64
Singles	$150,000	$60,000	$30,000	$15,000	$7,725	$4,125	$2,250
