= 1994 WTA German Open – Singles =

Singles
- 1994 WTA German Open

Final
- Champion: (Germany) Steffi Graf
- Runner-up: (Netherlands) Brenda Schultz
- Score: 7–6^{(8–6)}, 6–4

Details
- Draw: 56 (8 Q / 3 WC)
- Seeds: 16

Events
Singles	Doubles
← 1993 ·	WTA German Open	· 1995 →

Steffi Graf was the three-time defending champion and successfully defended her title, defeating Brenda Schultz in the final, 7–6^{(8–6)}, 6–4.

== Seeds ==
The top eight seeds received a bye to the second round.

1. (Germany) Steffi Graf (champion)
2. (Spain) Arantxa Sánchez Vicario (second round)
3. (Czech Republic) Jana Novotná (semifinal)
4. (Argentina) Gabriela Sabatini (third round)
5. (Japan) Kimiko Date (second round)
6. (Belarus) Natalia Zvereva (second round)
7. (Germany) Anke Huber (semifinal)
8. (France) Mary Pierce (third round)
9. (Germany) Sabine Hack (third round)
10. (France) Nathalie Tauziat (second round)
11. (Netherlands) Brenda Schultz (final)
12. (France) Julie Halard (quarterfinal)
13. (United States) Ginger Helgeson-Nielsen (third round)
14. (Bulgaria) Katerina Maleeva (third round)
15. (Germany) Barbara Rittner (third round)
16. (Germany) Meike Babel (first round)

== Draw ==
=== Key ===
- Q = Qualifier
- WC = Wild card
- LL = Lucky loser
- Alt = Alternate
- SE = Special exempt
- PR = Protected ranking
- ITF = ITF entry
- JE = Junior exempt
- w/o = Walkover
- r = Retired
- d = Defaulted
- SR = Special ranking

=== Finals ===
Quarterfinals
1	(Germany) Steffi Graf	6	4	7
12	(France) Julie Halard	3	6	5
3	(Czech Republic) Jana Novotná	6	6
(Argentina) Inés Gorrochategui	2	2
11	(Netherlands) Brenda Schultz	6	6
(United States) Ann Grossman	2	2
7	(Germany) Anke Huber	6	6
(Russia) Elena Makarova	0	1

Semifinals
1	(Germany) Steffi Graf	6	6
3	(Czech Republic) Jana Novotná	2	3
11	(Netherlands) Brenda Schultz	7	6
7	(Germany) Anke Huber	6	3

Final
1	(Germany) Steffi Graf	7	6
11	(Netherlands) Brenda Schultz	6	4

=== Top half ===
==== Section 1 ====
First round
(Germany) K Kschwendt	6	6
(Argentina) P Tarabini	3	3
Q	(France) N Herreman	3	6	7
WC	(Germany) H Rusch	6	1	6
(United Kingdom) C Wood	4	2
13	(United States) G Helgeson-Nielsen	6	6
12	(France) J Halard	3	7	6
(Kazakhstan) E Likhovtseva	6	5	4
(Mexico) A Gavaldón	6	7	7
(Spain) N Ávila Bonastra	7	5	5
(Argentina) B Fulco-Villella	6	6
(France) S Testud	1	1

Second round
1	(Germany) S Graf	7	6
(Germany) K Kschwendt	6	2
Q	(France) N Herreman	1	1
13	(United States) G Helgeson-Nielsen	6	6
12	(France) J Halard	6	7
(Mexico) A Gavaldón	4	6
(Argentina) B Fulco-Villella	2	1
8	(France) M Pierce	6	6

Third round
1	(Germany) S Graf	6	6
13	(United States) G Helgeson-Nielsen	2	2
12	(France) J Halard	6	6
8	(France) M Pierce	2	4

Quarterfinals
1	(Germany) Steffi Graf	6	4	7
12	(France) Julie Halard	3	6	5

==== Section 2 ====
First round
(United States) S Stafford	6	6
Q	(Croatia) M Murić	1	2
(Italy) S Farina	6	6
Q	(Bulgaria) L Bacheva	1	4
Q	(Belarus) T Ignatieva	6	6
16	(Germany) M Babel	4	1
9	(Germany) S Hack	6	6
(Netherlands) N Krijger Jagerman	4	1
(Spain) V Ruano Pascual	3	4
(Canada) P Hy	6	6
(Argentina) I Gorrochategui	6	6	6
(Argentina) M Gaidano	7	2	2

Second round
3	(Czech Republic) J Novotná	6	6
(United States) S Stafford	3	1
(Italy) S Farina	3	2
Q	(Belarus) T Ignatieva	6	6
9	(Germany) S Hack	6	6
(Canada) P Hy	2	0
(Argentina) I Gorrochategui	7
6	(Belarus) N Zvereva	6^{r}

Third round
3	(Czech Republic) J Novotná	4	6	6
Q	(Belarus) T Ignatieva	6	1	2
9	(Germany) S Hack	4	2
(Argentina) I Gorrochategui	6	6

Quarterfinals
3	(Czech Republic) Jana Novotná	6	6
(Argentina) Inés Gorrochategui	2	2

=== Bottom half ===
==== Section 1 ====
First round
(Israel) A Smashnova	2	5
WC	(Germany) S Meier	6	7
Q	(Italy) L Garrone	6	6
WC	(Germany) C Hofmann	2	0
(Italy) S Cecchini	4	3
11	(Netherlands) B Schultz	6	6
10	(France) N Tauziat	6	7
Q	(Brazil) A Vieira	1	5
(United States) A Grossman	6	6
(United States) S Cacic	3	4
(United States) K Po	6	6
(Australia) J Byrne	2	2

Second round
5	(Japan) K Date	4	6	2
WC	(Germany) S Meier	6	4	6
Q	(Italy) L Garrone	2	6
11	(Netherlands) B Schultz	6	7
10	(France) N Tauziat	6	2	3
(United States) A Grossman	3	6	6
(United States) K Po	4	0
4	(Argentina) G Sabatini	6	6

Third round
WC	(Germany) S Meier	2	4
11	(Netherlands) B Schultz	6	6
(United States) A Grossman	6	6
4	(Argentina) G Sabatini	3	4

Quarterfinals
11	(Netherlands) Brenda Schultz	6	6
(United States) Ann Grossman	2	2

==== Section 2 ====
First round
(Austria) P Ritter	6	7
(Netherlands) M Bollegraf	2	5
LL	(Canada) S Jeyaseelan	1	1
(Germany) W Probst	6	6
(United States) G Fernández	4	6	3
14	(Bulgaria) K Maleeva	6	4	6
15	(Germany) B Rittner	6	6
(Latvia) L Savchenko-Neiland	4	3
Q	(Slovakia) R Zrubáková	6	3	3
Q	(Bulgaria) E Pampoulova	1	6	6
(Netherlands) C Vis	5	3
(Russia) E Makarova	7	6

Second round
7	(Germany) A Huber	6	6
(Austria) P Ritter	2	3
(Germany) W Probst	6	5
14	(Bulgaria) K Maleeva	7	7
15	(Germany) B Rittner	7	6
Q	(Bulgaria) E Pampoulova	5	3
(Russia) E Makarova	6	5	7
2	(Spain) A Sánchez Vicario	4	7	6

Third round
7	(Germany) A Huber	5	6	6
14	(Bulgaria) K Maleeva	7	4	4
15	(Germany) B Rittner	2	1
(Russia) E Makarova	6	6

Quarterfinals
7	(Germany) Anke Huber	6	6
(Russia) Elena Makarova	0	1
