= Maria Francesca Bentivoglio =

Italian tennis player

- Country (sports): Italy
- Born: 27 January 1977 (age 48)
- Retired: 1994
- Prize money: $50,031

Singles
- Career record: 36–30
- Career titles: 0
- Highest ranking: No. 73 (23 August 1993)

Grand Slam singles results
- French Open: 2R (1994)
- US Open: 1R (1993)

Doubles
- Career record: 2–4
- Career titles: 0

Maria Francesca Bentivoglio (born 27 January 1977) is a former tennis player from Italy. On 23 August 1993, she reached her highest WTA singles ranking of No. 73.

She reached the quarterfinals of the 1993 Italian Open, after beating Manon Bollegraf, Jana Novotná and Natasha Zvereva. The same year she won the 1993 US Open Championships in Juniors. She was a member of the Italian Fed Cup team. She retired prematurely in 1994 and became a gynaecologist.

== ITF finals ==
=== Singles (0–2) ===
Legend
$50,000 tournaments
$25,000 tournaments
$10,000 tournaments

Outcome	No.	Date	Tournament	Surface	Opponent	Score
Runner-up	1.	27 April 1992	Riccione, Italy	Clay	(Australia) Kirrily Sharpe	5–7, 3–6
Runner-up	2.	31 January 1993	Båstad, Sweden	Hard	(Russia) Elena Likhovtseva	2–6, 1–6
