= Àlex Corretja career statistics =

Career finals
Discipline	Type	Won	Lost	Total	WR ^{1}
Singles	Grand Slam	–	2	2	0.00
Singles	ATP Finals	1	–	1	1.00
Singles	ATP 1000 ^{2}	2	3	5	0.40
Singles	Olympics	–	–	–	–
Singles	ATP 500	5	–	5	1.00
Singles	ATP 250	9	8	17	0.53
Singles	Total	17	13	30	0.57
Doubles	Grand Slam	–	–	–	–
Doubles	ATP Finals	–	–	–	–
Doubles	ATP 1000 ^{2}	–	–	–	–
Doubles	Olympics	–	–	–	–
Doubles	ATP 500	1	2	3	0.33
Doubles	ATP 250	2	2	4	0.50
Doubles	Total	3	4	7	0.43
^{1)} WR = Winning Rate^{2)} Formerly known as "Super 9" (1996–1999), "Tennis Masters Series" (2000–2003) or "ATP Masters Series" (2004–2008)

This is a list of main career statistics of Spanish former professional tennis player Àlex Corretja. His career started when he turned professional in 1991 and lasted until his retirement in 2005.

Corretja reached a highest singles ranking of world No. 2 ranking on 1 February 1999. During his career he played in 30 singles finals of which he won 17 and has a career win–loss record of 438–281 (60.9%). He competed in 19 ties for the Spanish Davis Cup team between 1997 and 2003 and was a member of the Davis Cup winning team in 2000.

== Grand Slam tournaments ==
=== Singles: (2 runner-ups) ===
Result	Year	Championship	Surface	Opponent	Score
Loss	1998	French Open	Clay	(Spain) Carlos Moyá	3–6, 5–7, 3–6
Loss	2001	French Open	Clay	(Brazil) Gustavo Kuerten	7–6^{(7–3)}, 5–7, 2–6, 0–6

== Other significant finals ==
=== Year-end championships finals ===
==== Singles: 1 (1 title) ====
Result	Year	Championship	Surface	Opponent	Score
Win	1998	ATP Tour World Championships, Hanover	Hard (i)	(Spain) Carlos Moyà	3–6, 3–6, 7–5, 6–3, 7–5

=== Olympics medal matches ===
==== Doubles: 1 (1 bronze medal) ====
Result	Year	Tournament	Surface	Partner	Opponents	Score
Bronze	2000	Summer Olympics	Hard	(Spain) Albert Costa	(South Africa) David Adams (South Africa) John-Laffnie de Jager	2–6, 6–4, 6–3

=== Masters Series tournaments ===
==== Singles: 5 (2 titles, 3 runner-ups) ====
Result	Year	Tournament	Surface	Opponent	Score
Loss	1996	Hamburg Masters	Clay	(Spain) Roberto Carretero	6–2, 4–6, 4–6, 4–6
Loss	1997	Monte-Carlo Masters	Clay	(Chile) Marcelo Ríos	4–6, 3–6, 3–6
Win	1997	Rome Masters	Clay	(Chile) Marcelo Ríos	7–5, 7–5, 6–3
Loss	1998	Hamburg Masters	Clay	(Spain) Albert Costa	2–6, 0–6, 0–1 ret.
Win	2000	Indian Wells Masters	Hard	(Sweden) Thomas Enqvist	6–4, 6–4, 6–3

== Career finals ==
=== ATP career finals ===
==== Singles: 30 (17 titles, 13 runner-ups) ====
Legend Grand Slam (0–2) Tennis Masters Cup (1–0) ATP Masters Series (2–3) ATP International Series Gold (5–0) ATP International Series (9–8)	Titles by surface Hard (6–3) Clay (10–10) Grass (0–0) Carpet (1–0)	Titles by setting Outdoors (14–13) Indoors (3–0)

Result	W-L	Date	Tournament	Surface	Opponent	Score
Loss	0–1	Nov 1992	Guarujá, Brazil	Hard	(Germany) Carsten Arriens	6–7^{(5–7)}, 3–6
Loss	0–2	Oct 1994	Palermo, Italy	Clay	(Spain) Alberto Berasategui	6–2, 6–7^{(6–8)}, 4–6
Win	1–2	Nov 1994	Buenos Aires, Argentina	Clay	(Argentina) Javier Frana	6–3, 5–7, 7–6^{(7–5)}
Loss	1–3	May 1996	Hamburg, Germany	Clay	(Spain) Roberto Carretero	6–2, 4–6, 4–6, 4–6
Loss	1–4	Jul 1996	Kitzbühel, Austria	Clay	(Spain) Alberto Berasategui	2–6, 4–6, 4–6
Loss	1–5	Oct 1996	Marbella, Spain	Clay	(Germany) Marc-Kevin Goellner	6–7^{(4–7)}, 6–7^{(2–7)}
Win	2–5	Apr 1997	Estoril, Portugal	Clay	(Spain) Francisco Clavet	6–3, 7–5
Loss	2–6	Apr 1997	Monte Carlo, Monaco	Clay	(Chile) Marcelo Ríos	4–6, 4–6, 3–6
Loss	2–7	May 1997	Munich, Germany	Clay	(Australia) Mark Philippoussis	6–7^{(3–7)}, 6–1, 4–6
Win	3–7	May 1997	Rome, Italy	Clay	(Chile) Marcelo Ríos	7–5, 7–5, 6–3
Win	4–7	Jul 1997	Stuttgart Outdoor, Germany	Clay	(Slovakia) Karol Kučera	6–2, 7–5
Win	5–7	Feb 1998	Dubai, UAE	Hard	(Spain) Félix Mantilla	7–6^{(7–0)}, 6–0
Loss	5–8	May 1998	Hamburg, Germany	Clay	(Spain) Albert Costa	2–6, 0–6, 0–1, ret.
Loss	5–9	Jun 1998	French Open, Paris, France	Clay	(Spain) Carlos Moyà	3–6, 5–7, 3–6
Win	6–9	Jul 1998	Gstaad, Switzerland	Clay	(Germany) Boris Becker	7–6^{(7–5)}, 7–5, 6–3
Win	7–9	Aug 1998	Indianapolis, U.S.	Hard	(United States) Andre Agassi	2–6, 6–2, 6–3
Win	8–9	Oct 1998	Lyon, France	Carpet (i)	(Germany) Tommy Haas	2–6, 7–6^{(8–6)}, 6–1
Win	9–9	Nov 1998	Hanover, Germany	Hard (i)	(Spain) Carlos Moyà	3–6, 3–6, 7–5, 6–3, 7–5
Loss	9–10	Jan 1999	Sydney, Australia	Hard	(United States) Todd Martin	3–6, 6–7^{(5–7)}
Loss	9–11	Aug 1999	Long Island, U.S.	Hard	(Sweden) Magnus Norman	6–7^{(4–7)}, 6–4, 3–6
Loss	9–12	Sep 1999	Mallorca, Spain	Clay	(Spain) Juan Carlos Ferrero	6–2, 5–7, 3–6
Win	10–12	Mar 2000	Indian Wells, U.S.	Hard	(Sweden) Thomas Enqvist	6–4, 6–4, 6–3
Win	11–12	Jul 2000	Gstaad, Switzerland	Clay	(Argentina) Mariano Puerta	6–1, 6–3
Win	12–12	Jul 2000	Kitzbühel, Austria	Clay	(Spain) Emilio Benfele Álvarez	6–3, 6–1, 3–0 retired
Win	13–12	Aug 2000	Washington, U.S.	Hard	(United States) Andre Agassi	6–2, 6–3
Win	14–12	Oct 2000	Toulouse, France	Hard (i)	(Spain) Carlos Moyà	6–3, 6–2
Loss	14–13	Jun 2001	French Open, Paris, France	Clay	(Brazil) Gustavo Kuerten	7–6^{(7–3)}, 5–7, 2–6, 0–6
Win	15–13	Jul 2001	Amsterdam, Netherlands	Clay	(Morocco) Younes El Aynaoui	6–3, 5–7, 7–6^{(7–0)}, 3–6, 6–4
Win	16–13	Jul 2002	Gstaad, Switzerland	Clay	(Argentina) Gastón Gaudio	6–3, 7–6^{(7–3)}, 7–6^{(7–3)}
Win	17–13	Jul 2002	Kitzbühel, Austria	Clay	(Spain) Juan Carlos Ferrero	6–4, 6–1, 6–3

==== Doubles: 7 (3 titles, 4 runner-ups) ====
Legend Grand Slam (0–0) Tennis Masters Cup (0–0) ATP Masters Series (0–0) ATP International Series Gold (1–2) ATP International Series (2–2)	Titles by surface Hard (0–0) Clay (3–4) Grass (0–0) Carpet (0–0)	Titles by setting Outdoors (3–4) Indoors (0–0)

Result	W-L	Date	Tournament	Surface	Partner	Opponents	Score
Loss	0–1	Jun 1995	Oporto, Portugal	Clay	(Spain) Jordi Arrese	(Spain) Tomás Carbonell (Spain) Francisco Roig	3–6, 6–7
Win	1–1	Oct 1995	Palermo, Italy	Clay	(France) Fabrice Santoro	(Netherlands) Hendrik Jan Davids (South Africa) Piet Norval	6–7, 6–4, 6–3
Loss	1–2	Apr 1997	Barcelona, Spain	Clay	(Argentina) Pablo Albano	(Spain) Alberto Berasategui (Spain) Jordi Burillo	3–6, 5–7
Win	2–2	May 1997	Munich, Germany	Clay	(Argentina) Pablo Albano	(Germany) Karsten Braasch (Germany) Jens Knippschild	3–6, 7–5, 6–2
Loss	2–3	Jul 2001	Amsterdam, Netherlands	Clay	(Argentina) Luis Lobo	(Netherlands) Paul Haarhuis (Netherlands) Sjeng Schalken	4–6, 2–6
Win	3–3	Jul 2001	Kitzbühel, Austria	Clay	(Argentina) Luis Lobo	(Sweden) Simon Aspelin (Australia) Andrew Kratzmann	6–1, 6–4
Loss	3–4	Jul 2002	Kitzbühel, Austria	Clay	(Argentina) Lucas Arnold Ker	(South Africa) Robbie Koenig (Japan) Thomas Shimada	6–7^{(3–7)}, 4–6

== Other finals ==
=== ATP Challengers and ITF Futures ===
==== Singles: 1 (1 runner-up) ====
Legend
ATP Challengers (0–1)
ITF Futures (0–0)

Result	No.	Date	Tournament	Surface	Opponent	Score
Loss	1.	14 Jun 1992	Yvetot, France	Clay	(Haiti) Ronald Agénor	4–6, 6–2, 5–7

==== Doubles: 2 (2 runner-ups) ====
Legend
ATP Challengers (0–2)
ITF Futures (0–0)

Result	No.	Date	Tournament	Surface	Partner	Opponents	Score
Loss	1.	5 Jul 1992	Oporto, Portugal	Clay	(Spain) Jordi Arrese	(United States) Doug Eisenman (Norway) Bent-Ove Pedersen	6–1, 4–6, 2–6
Loss	2.	25 Sep 1994	Barcelona, Spain	Clay	(Spain) Francisco Clavet	(Spain) Sergio Casal (Spain) Emilio Sanchez	2–6, 5–7

== Performance timelines ==
Key
W	F	SF	QF	#R	RR	Q#	P#	DNQ	A	Z#	PO	G	S	B	NMS	NTI	P	NH

(W) winner; (F) finalist; (SF) semifinalist; (QF) quarterfinalist; (#R) rounds 4, 3, 2, 1; (RR) round-robin stage; (Q#) qualification round; (P#) preliminary round; (DNQ) did not qualify; (A) absent; (Z#) Davis/Fed Cup Zonal Group (with number indication) or (PO) play-off; (G) gold, (S) silver or (B) bronze Olympic/Paralympic medal; (NMS) not a Masters tournament; (NTI) not a Tier I tournament; (P) postponed; (NH) not held; (SR) strike rate (events won / competed); (W–L) win–loss record.

=== Singles ===
Tournament	1991	1992	1993	1994	1995	1996	1997	1998	1999	2000	2001	2002	2003	2004	2005	SR	W–L	Win %
Grand Slam Tournaments
Australian Open	A	A	A	A	A	2R	2R	3R	2R	2R	A	1R	1R	2R	A	0 / 8	7–8	47%
French Open	A	1R	1R	3R	4R	2R	4R	F	QF	QF	F	SF	1R	3R	A	0 / 13	36–13	74%
Wimbledon	A	A	A	2R	A	2R	A	1R	A	A	A	A	A	1R	A	0 / 4	2–4	33%
US Open	A	1R	1R	1R	2R	QF	3R	4R	1R	3R	3R	3R	1R	1R	A	0 / 13	16–13	55%
Win–loss	0–0	0–2	0–2	3–3	4–2	7–4	6–2	11–4	5–3	7–3	8–2	7–3	0–3	3–4	0–0	0 / 38	61–37	62%
Year-end championship
Tennis Masters Cup	did not qualify							W	DNQ	RR	did not qualify					1 / 2	5–3	63%
Grand Slam Cup	did not qualify					RR	did not qualify			not held						0 / 1	0–1	0%
National representation
Summer Olympics	NH	A	not held			A	not held			3R	not held			A	NH	0 / 1	2–1	67%
Davis Cup	A	A	A	A	A	PO	QF	SF	1R	W	1R	QF	F	A	A	1 / 7	12–3	80%
ATP Masters Series
Indian Wells Masters	A	A	A	A	1R	2R	2R	1R	2R	W	3R	2R	2R	3R	A	1 / 10	14–8	64%
Miami Masters	A	A	A	A	1R	2R	3R	SF	4R	2R	4R	4R	2R	Q1	A	0 / 9	13–9	59%
Monte-Carlo Masters	A	A	QF	3R	3R	1R	F	QF	A	QF	1R	3R	1R	2R	A	0 / 11	20–11	65%
Rome Masters	A	2R	2R	2R	3R	1R	W	2R	SF	SF	QF	1R	2R	1R	A	1 / 13	24–12	67%
Hamburg Masters	A	2R	A	3R	1R	F	3R	F	A	3R	2R	2R	1R	1R	A	0 / 11	18–11	62%
Canada Masters	A	A	A	A	A	2R	A	A	A	A	A	A	A	A	A	0 / 1	1–1	50%
Cincinnati Masters	A	A	A	A	1R	1R	3R	2R	2R	1R	A	A	1R	A	A	0 / 7	2–7	22%
Stuttgart Masters^{1}	A	A	A	A	1R	1R	1R	3R	2R	2R	3R	2R	2R	A	A	0 / 9	5–9	35%
Paris Masters	A	A	A	A	A	1R	2R	1R	2R	QF	2R	A	A	Q1	A	0 / 6	3–6	33%
Win–loss	0–0	2–2	4–2	5–3	4–6	8–8	18–7	12–8	7–6	17–7	8–7	8–6	3–7	4–5	0–0	2 / 77	100–74	57%
Career statistics
Finals	0	1	0	2	0	3	5	7	3	5	2	2	0	0	0	30		57%
Titles	0	0	0	1	0	0	3	5	0	5	1	2	0	0	0	17		57%
Win–loss	0–0	11–13	24–23	44–22	25–26	37–25	49–22	57–21	37–23	54–19	34–20	39–19	14–23	12–20	1–5	438–281		
Win %	–	46%	51%	67%	49%	60%	69%	73%	62%	74%	63%	67%	38%	38%	17%	60.92%		
Year-end ranking	235	86	76	22	48	23	12	3	27	8	16	19	100	114	525			

^{1}Held as Stuttgart Masters until 2001, Madrid Masters from 2002 to 2008.

=== Doubles ===
Tournament	1991	1992	1993	1994	1995	1996	1997	1998	1999	2000	2001	2002	2003	2004	2005	SR	W–L	Win %
Grand Slam Tournaments
Australian Open	A	A	A	A	A	1R	1R	3R	A	A	A	1R	2R	A	A	0 / 5	3–5	38%
French Open	A	A	A	A	A	A	A	A	A	A	A	A	A	A	A	0 / 0	0–0	–
Wimbledon	A	A	A	A	A	3R	A	A	A	A	A	A	A	A	A	0 / 1	2–1	67%
US Open	A	A	A	A	A	3R	2R	A	A	A	A	A	A	A	A	0 / 2	3–1	75%
Win–loss	0–0	0–0	0–0	0–0	0–0	4–3	1–1	2–1	0–0	0–0	0–0	0–1	1–1	0–0	0–0	0 / 8	8–7	53%
National representation
Summer Olympics	NH	A	not held			A	not held			SF-B	not held			A	NH	0 / 1	4–1	80%
Davis Cup	A	A	A	A	A	PO	QF	SF	1R	W	1R	QF	F	A	A	1 / 7	8–8	50%
ATP Masters Series
Indian Wells Masters	A	A	A	A	A	A	A	1R	1R	A	2R	2R	2R	A	A	0 / 5	3–5	38%
Miami Masters	A	A	A	A	A	2R	1R	1R	1R	1R	1R	SF	1R	A	A	0 / 8	5–8	38%
Monte-Carlo Masters	A	A	A	A	A	2R	2R	2R	A	A	1R	A	A	A	A	0 / 4	3–4	43%
Rome Masters	A	A	A	A	A	A	2R	A	A	A	A	A	A	A	A	0 / 1	1–1	50%
Hamburg Masters	A	A	A	A	A	Q1	A	A	A	A	A	A	A	A	A	0 / 0	0–0	–
Canada Masters	A	A	A	A	A	2R	A	A	A	A	A	A	A	A	A	0 / 1	1–1	50%
Cincinnati Masters	A	A	A	A	A	1R	2R	1R	A	1R	A	A	1R	A	A	0 / 5	1–5	17%
Stuttgart Masters^{1}	A	A	A	A	A	A	A	A	A	A	2R	A	1R	A	A	0 / 2	1–2	33%
Paris Masters	A	A	A	A	A	A	A	A	A	A	A	A	QF	A	A	0 / 1	1–1	50%
Win–loss	0–0	0–0	0–0	0–0	0–0	3–4	3–4	1–4	0–2	0–2	2–4	5–2	2–5	0–0	0–0	0 / 27	16–27	37%
Career statistics
Finals	0	0	0	0	2	0	2	0	0	0	2	1	0	0	0	7		43%
Titles	0	0	0	0	1	0	1	0	0	0	1	0	0	0	0	3		43%
Win–loss	0–0	2–4	0–3	1–1	14–12	15–17	17–15	4–10	0–6	11–6	14–9	14–11	8–13	3–7	0–1	103–115		
Win %	–	33%	0%	50%	54%	47%	53%	29%	0%	65%	61%	67%	56%	38%	0%	47.25%		
Year-end ranking	404	263	632	288	122	111	76	265	1218	304	99	88	125	297	1430			

^{1}Held as Stuttgart Masters until 2001, Madrid Masters from 2002 to 2008.

== Record against top-10 players ==
=== Top-10 wins per season ===
Season	1990	1991	1992	1993	1994	1995	1996	1997	1998	1999	2000	2001	2002	2003	2004	2005	Total
Wins	0	0	0	0	3	2	0	3	8	1	5	4	3	1	1	0	31

#	Player	Rank	Event	Surface	Rd	Score
1994
1.	(United States) Jim Courier	5	Barcelona, Spain	Clay	2R	6–2, 3–6, 6–3
2.	(United States) Jim Courier	10	Indianapolis, United States	Hard	2R	1–6, 6–4, 6–3
3.	(Sweden) Stefan Edberg	4	Indianapolis, United States	Hard	QF	1–6, 6–2, 6–4
1995
4.	(South Africa) Wayne Ferreira	8	French Open, Paris, France	Clay	3R	6–4, 7–5, 6–2
5.	(Austria) Thomas Muster	4	Gstaad, Switzerland	Clay	1R	7–5, 6–1
1997
6.	(Spain) Carlos Moyá	8	Rome, Italy	Clay	3R	6–4, 6–4
7.	(Croatia) Goran Ivanišević	6	Rome, Italy	Clay	SF	7–6^{(7–5)}, 7–6^{(7–4)}
8.	(Chile) Marcelo Ríos	9	Rome, Italy	Clay	F	7–5, 7–5, 6–3
1998
9.	(Sweden) Jonas Björkman	4	Dubai, United Arab Emirates	Hard	SF	6–3, 6–3
10.	(Brazil) Gustavo Kuerten	10	Davis Cup, Porto Alegre, Brazil	Clay	RR	6–3, 7–5, 4–6, 6–4
11.	(Brazil) Gustavo Kuerten	8	Hamburg, Germany	Clay	QF	4–6, 7–6^{(10–8)}, 6–4
12.	(United Kingdom) Greg Rusedski	7	Indianapolis, United States	Hard	QF	6–4, 6–3
13.	(United States) Andre Agassi	8	Indianapolis, United States	Hard	F	2–6, 6–2, 6–3
14.	(United States) Andre Agassi	4	ATP Tour World Championships, Hanover, Germany	Hard (i)	RR	5–7, 6–3, 2–1, ret.
15.	(United States) Pete Sampras	1	ATP Tour World Championships, Hanover, Germany	Hard (i)	SF	4–6, 6–3, 7–6^{(7–3)}
16.	(Spain) Carlos Moyá	5	ATP Tour World Championships, Hanover, Germany	Hard (i)	F	3–6, 3–6, 7–5, 6–3, 7–5
1999
17.	(Slovakia) Karol Kučera	8	Sydney, Australia	Hard	SF	7–5, 6–4
2000
18.	(Sweden) Magnus Norman	5	Indian Wells, United States	Hard	QF	4–6, 6–2, 6–2
19.	(Ecuador) Nicolás Lapentti	8	Indian Wells, United States	Hard	SF	6–3, 6–4
20.	(Sweden) Thomas Enqvist	10	Indian Wells, United States	Hard	F	6–4, 6–4, 6–3
21.	(United States) Andre Agassi	1	Washington D.C., United States	Hard	F	6–2, 6–3
22.	(Australia) Lleyton Hewitt	6	Tennis Masters Cup, Lisbon, Portugal	Hard (i)	RR	3–6, 7–6^{(7–3)}, 6–3
2001
23.	(Australia) Lleyton Hewitt	7	Rome, Italy	Clay	3R	7–6^{(7–2)}, 6–4
24.	(Australia) Lleyton Hewitt	6	World Team Cup, Düsseldorf, Germany	Clay	RR	3–6, 6–2, 6–3
25.	(Sweden) Magnus Norman	9	World Team Cup, Düsseldorf, Germany	Clay	RR	6–0, 6–4
26.	(France) Sébastien Grosjean	10	French Open, Paris, France	Clay	SF	7–6^{(7–2)}, 6–4, 6–4
2002
27.	(Russia) Yevgeny Kafelnikov	4	Hamburg, Germany	Clay	1R	6–1, 6–2
28.	(Spain) Albert Costa	6	Kitzbühel, Austria	Clay	QF	6–1, 6–2
29.	(Spain) Juan Carlos Ferrero	8	Kitzbühel, Austria	Clay	F	6–4, 6–1, 6–3
2003
30.	(France) Sébastien Grosjean	10	St. Petersburg, Russia	Hard (i)	QF	4–6, 6–2, 7–6^{(7–5)}
2004
31.	(Spain) Juan Carlos Ferrero	3	Monte Carlo, Monaco	Clay	1R	6–2, 6–3

== Career Grand Slam tournament seedings ==
The tournaments won by Corretja are bolded.

=== Singles ===
Legend
seeded No. 1 (0 / 0)
seeded No. 2 (0 / 1)
seeded No. 3 (0 / 0)
seeded No. 4–10 (0 / 7)
Seeded outside the Top 10 (0 / 10)
not seeded (0 / 18)
qualifier (0 / 1)
wild card (0 / 1)
lucky loser (0 / 0)
alternate (0 / 0)
special exempt (0 / 0)
protected ranking (0 / 0)

Year	Australian Open	French Open	Wimbledon	US Open
1991	did not play	did not play	did not play	did not play
1992	did not play	qualifier	did not play	not seeded
1993	did not play	wild card	did not play	not seeded
1994	did not play	not seeded	not seeded	not seeded
1995	did not play	not seeded	did not play	not seeded
1996	not seeded	not seeded	not seeded	not seeded
1997	not seeded	8th	did not play	6th
1998	11th	14th	10th	7th
1999	2nd	6th	did not play	13th
2000	not seeded	10th	did not play	8th
2001	did not play	13th	did not play	11th
2002	14th	18th	did not play	18th
2003	15th	16th	did not play	not seeded
2004	not seeded	not seeded	not seeded	not seeded
2005	did not play	did not play	did not play	did not play
2006	did not play	did not play	did not play	did not play

=== Doubles ===
Legend
seeded No. 1 (0 / 0)
seeded No. 2 (0 / 0)
seeded No. 3 (0 / 0)
seeded No. 4–10 (0 / 0)
Seeded outside the Top 10 (0 / 0)
not seeded (0 / 8)
qualifier (0 / 0)
wild card (0 / 0)
lucky loser (0 / 0)
alternate (0 / 0)
special exempt (0 / 0)
protected ranking (0 / 0)

Year	Australian Open	French Open	Wimbledon	US Open
1990	did not play	did not play	did not play	did not play
1991	did not play	did not play	did not play	did not play
1992	did not play	did not play	did not play	did not play
1993	did not play	did not play	did not play	did not play
1994	did not play	did not play	did not play	did not play
1995	did not play	did not play	did not play	did not play
1996	not seeded	did not play	not seeded	not seeded
1997	not seeded	did not play	did not play	not seeded
1998	not seeded	did not play	did not play	did not play
1999	did not play	did not play	did not play	did not play
2000	did not play	did not play	did not play	did not play
2001	did not play	did not play	did not play	did not play
2002	not seeded	did not play	did not play	did not play
2003	not seeded	did not play	did not play	did not play
2004	did not play	did not play	did not play	did not play
2005	did not play	did not play	did not play	did not play
2006	did not play	did not play	did not play	did not play

== National participation ==
=== Team competitions finals: 2 (1 title, 1 runner-up) ===
Result	No.	Date	Tournament	Surface	Partners	Opponents	Score
Win	1.	8–10 December 2000	Davis Cup, Barcelona, Spain	Clay	(Spain) Albert Costa (Spain) Juan Carlos Ferrero (Spain) Juan Manuel Balcells	(Australia) Lleyton Hewitt (Australia) Patrick Rafter (Australia) Mark Woodforde (Australia) Sandon Stolle	3–1
Loss	1.	28–30 November 2003	Davis Cup, Melbourne, Australia	Grass	(Spain) Juan Carlos Ferrero (Spain) Carlos Moyà (Spain) Feliciano López	(Australia) Lleyton Hewitt (Australia) Mark Philippoussis (Australia) Todd Woodbridge (Australia) Wayne Arthurs	1–3
