= 1996 Italian Open – Men's singles =

Men's singles
- 1996 Italian Open

Final
- Champion: (Austria) Thomas Muster
- Runner-up: (Netherlands) Richard Krajicek
- Score: 6–2, 6–4, 3–6, 6–3

Details
- Draw: 64 (5WC/8Q)
- Seeds: 16

Events
Singles	men	women
Doubles	men	women
- Italian Open

Defending champion Thomas Muster defeated Richard Krajicek in the final, 6–2, 6–4, 3–6, 6–3 to win the men's singles tennis title at the 1996 Italian Open.

== Seeds ==
1. (Austria) Thomas Muster (champion)
2. (Croatia) Goran Ivanišević (third round)
3. (Russia) Yevgeny Kafelnikov (third round)
4. (Sweden) Thomas Enqvist (third round)
5. (United States) Jim Courier (second round)
6. (South Africa) Wayne Ferreira (semifinals)
7. (Chile) Marcelo Ríos (quarterfinals)
8. (Spain) Sergi Bruguera (first round)
9. (France) Arnaud Boetsch (first round)
10. (Switzerland) Marc Rosset (third round)
11. (Spain) Albert Costa (semifinals)
12. (United States) MaliVai Washington (second round)
13. (Germany) Michael Stich (second round)
14. (Ukraine) Andriy Medvedev (quarterfinals)
15. (United States) Todd Martin (third round)
16. (France) Cédric Pioline (second round)

== Draw ==
Key

- Q = Qualifier
- WC = Wild card
- LL = Lucky loser
- Alt = Alternate
- ITF = ITF entry
- PR = Protected ranking
- SR = Special ranking
- SE = Special exempt
- JE = Junior exempt
- JR = Junior Accelerator Programme entrant
- CO = College Accelerator Programme entrant
- NG = Next Gen Accelerator Program entrant
- w/o = Walkover
- r = Retired
- d = Defaulted

=== Finals ===
Semifinals
1	(Austria) Thomas Muster	6	3	6
11	(Spain) Albert Costa	3	6	4
6	(South Africa) Wayne Ferreira	3	3
(Netherlands) Richard Krajicek	6	6

Final
1	(Austria) Thomas Muster	6	6	3	6
(Netherlands) Richard Krajicek	2	4	6	3

=== Top half ===
==== Section 1 ====
First round
1	(Austria) T Muster	6	6
Q	(Austria) H Wiltschnig	3	0
(Czech Republic) P Korda	3	6	6
(Spain) J Sánchez	6	3	4
Q	(Italy) V Santopadre	6^{3}	2
(Spain) A Berasategui	7^{7}	6
(Slovakia) K Kučera	1	3
15	(United States) T Martin	6	6
10	(Switzerland) M Rosset	6	7^{7}
Q	(Argentina) M Zabaleta	3	6^{2}
(Germany) B Karbacher	7^{8}	6
Q	(Australia) T Larkham	6^{6}	0
(Czech Republic) D Vacek	6	2	6
WC	(Italy) O Camporese	4	6	1
(Spain) À Corretja	6^{5}	6	2
7	(Chile) M Ríos	7^{7}	3	6

Second round
1	(Austria) T Muster	6	6
(Czech Republic) P Korda	2	3
(Spain) A Berasategui	6	3	4
15	(United States) T Martin	4	6	6
10	(Switzerland) M Rosset	6	3
(Germany) B Karbacher	1	0^{r}
(Czech Republic) D Vacek	3	3
7	(Chile) M Ríos	6	6

Third round
1	(Austria) T Muster	1	6	6
15	(United States) T Martin	6	4	2
10	(Switzerland) M Rosset	6^{5}	4
7	(Chile) M Ríos	7^{7}	6

Quarterfinals
1	(Austria) T Muster	6	6
7	(Chile) M Ríos	3	2

==== Section 2 ====
First round
4	(Sweden) T Enqvist	6	6
(Zimbabwe) B Black	2	1
WC	(Italy) D Nargiso	1	4
(Netherlands) P Haarhuis	6	6
(Switzerland) J Hlasek	5	1
(Italy) A Gaudenzi	7	6
WC	(Spain) E Sánchez	6^{5}	1
13	(Germany) M Stich	7^{7}	6
11	(Spain) A Costa	6	6^{3}	6
(Denmark) K Carlsen	1	7^{7}	4
(Netherlands) S Schalken	6	3	6
WC	(Italy) C Caratti	4	6	4
Q	(Egypt) T El-Sawy	2	5
(Argentina) H Gumy	6	7
(Italy) R Furlan	3	3
5	(United States) J Courier	6	6

Second round
4	(Sweden) T Enqvist	6	7^{7}
(Netherlands) P Haarhuis	4	6^{4}
(Italy) A Gaudenzi	6	3	6
13	(Germany) M Stich	4	6	4
11	(Spain) A Costa	6	6
(Netherlands) S Schalken	1	4
(Argentina) H Gumy	6	6
5	(United States) J Courier	4	4

Third round
4	(Sweden) T Enqvist	2	6^{7}
(Italy) A Gaudenzi	6	7^{9}
11	(Spain) A Costa	6	6
(Argentina) H Gumy	4	2

Quarterfinals
(Italy) A Gaudenzi	2	1
11	(Spain) A Costa	6	6

=== Bottom half ===
==== Section 3 ====
First round
6	(South Africa) W Ferreira	7^{7}	6
(France) G Forget	6^{5}	2
(United States) R Reneberg	6^{6}	6	6
(Morocco) Y El Aynaoui	7^{8}	3	1
(Spain) J Arrese	2	6	4
(Spain) C Moyá	6	4	6
WC	(Italy) G Pozzi	4	3
12	(United States) M Washington	6	6
14	(Ukraine) A Medvedev	6	2	6
(Norway) C Ruud	3	6	3
(Austria) G Schaller	6	4	1
Q	(Spain) E Benfele Álvarez	1	6	6
(Spain) C Costa	6	6
Q	(France) T Guardiola	2	1
Q	(Italy) C Borroni	6	3	4
3	(Russia) Y Kafelnikov	4	6	6

Second round
6	(South Africa) W Ferreira	6	6^{2}	6
(United States) R Reneberg	3	7^{7}	4
(Spain) C Moyá	7^{11}	7
12	(United States) M Washington	6^{9}	5
14	(Ukraine) A Medvedev	6	3	6
Q	(Spain) E Benfele Álvarez	4	6	1
(Spain) C Costa	1	2
3	(Russia) Y Kafelnikov	6	6

Third round
6	(South Africa) W Ferreira	2	6	6
(Spain) C Moyá	6	3	3
14	(Ukraine) A Medvedev	3	6	6
3	(Russia) Y Kafelnikov	6	3	0

Quarterfinals
6	(South Africa) W Ferreira	6	6
14	(Ukraine) A Medvedev	4	4

==== Section 4 ====
First round
8	(Spain) S Bruguera	4	4
(Netherlands) R Krajicek	6	6
(Spain) T Carbonell	6^{3}	3
(Spain) F Clavet	7^{7}	6
(Australia) M Philippoussis	6	4	7^{7}
(Spain) R Carretero	3	6	6^{3}
(Romania) A Voinea	3	6	7^{7}
9	(France) A Boetsch	6	4	6^{4}
16	(France) C Pioline	6	6
(Italy) S Pescosolido	3	2
(Netherlands) J Siemerink	3	4
(Sweden) S Edberg	6	6
(Japan) S Matsuoka	4	2
(Czech Republic) B Ulihrach	6	6
(United Kingdom) G Rusedski	6^{3}	3
2	(Croatia) G Ivanišević	7^{7}	6

Second round
(Netherlands) R Krajicek	6	6
(Spain) F Clavet	4	4
(Australia) M Philippoussis	7^{7}	6
(Romania) A Voinea	6^{4}	1
16	(France) C Pioline	3	6^{12}
(Sweden) S Edberg	6	7^{14}
(Czech Republic) B Ulihrach	6	4	1
2	(Croatia) G Ivanišević	1	6	6

Third round
(Netherlands) R Krajicek	6	6
(Australia) M Philippoussis	4	4
(Sweden) S Edberg	6	6
2	(Croatia) G Ivanišević	4	2

Quarterfinals
(Netherlands) R Krajicek	6	6
(Sweden) S Edberg	3	3

== Qualifying ==
=== Qualifying seeds ===
1. (Germany) Marc-Kevin Goellner (qualifying competition)
2. (Czech Republic) David Rikl (first round)
3. (Denmark) Frederik Fetterlein (first round)
4. (Hungary) Sándor Noszály (first round)
5. (Sweden) Magnus Norman (second round)
6. (n/a)
7. (Spain) Óscar Martínez (second round)
8. (Italy) Marco Meneschincheri (qualifying competition)
9. (France) Thierry Guardiola (qualified)
10. (Italy) Laurence Tieleman (first round)
11. (Argentina) Mariano Zabaleta (qualified)
12. (France) Daniel Courcol (second round)
13. (Brazil) Roberto Jabali (qualifying competition)
14. (France) Frédéric Fontang (qualifying competition)
15. (France) Thierry Champion (qualifying competition)
16. (Spain) Emilio Benfele Álvarez (qualified)

=== Qualifiers ===
1. (Spain) Emilio Benfele Álvarez
2. (Austria) Herbert Wiltschnig
3. (Australia) Todd Larkham
4. (Italy) Corrado Borroni
5. (Argentina) Mariano Zabaleta
6. (Egypt) Tamer El-Sawy
7. (Italy) Vincenzo Santopadre
8. (France) Thierry Guardiola

=== Qualifying draw ===
==== First qualifier ====
First round
1	(Germany) Marc-Kevin Goellner	3	7	6
(Czech Republic) Václav Roubíček	6	5	0
(Nigeria) Sule Ladipo	6	6	6
(Italy) Massimo Ardinghi	3	7	3
(Italy) Fabio Beraldo	6	7
(Germany) Jan Weinzierl	0	5
WC	(Italy) Gabrio Castrichella	6	4
16	(Spain) Emilio Benfele Álvarez	7	6

Second round
1	(Germany) Marc-Kevin Goellner	6	6
(Nigeria) Sule Ladipo	3	2
(Italy) Fabio Beraldo	2	4
16	(Spain) Emilio Benfele Álvarez	6	6

Qualifying competition
1	(Germany) Marc-Kevin Goellner	4	7	3
16	(Spain) Emilio Benfele Álvarez	6	6	6

==== Second qualifier ====
First round
2	(Czech Republic) David Rikl	4	1
(Romania) Răzvan Sabău	6	6
(France) Guillaume Marx	2	2
(Austria) Herbert Wiltschnig	6	6
(Australia) Ben Ellwood	6	6
(Germany) Carsten Arriens	2	4
(Spain) Víctor Sendín	6	4	6
15	(France) Thierry Champion	4	6	7

Second round
(Romania) Răzvan Sabău	3	6	4
(Austria) Herbert Wiltschnig	6	2	6
(Australia) Ben Ellwood	2	0
15	(France) Thierry Champion	6	6

Qualifying competition
(Austria) Herbert Wiltschnig	6	6
15	(France) Thierry Champion	1	4

==== Third qualifier ====
First round
3	(Denmark) Frederik Fetterlein	3	1
(Germany) Marcello Craca	6	6
(Australia) Todd Larkham	2	6	7
(Czech Republic) Radovan Světlík	6	2	5
(Germany) Markus Zillner	6	4	6
WC	(Italy) Florian Allgauer	1	6	3
WC	(Italy) Dario Sciortino	6	7	3
13	(Brazil) Roberto Jabali	7	5	6

Second round
(Germany) Marcello Craca	6	6	5
(Australia) Todd Larkham	7	1	7
(Germany) Markus Zillner	6	4	6
13	(Brazil) Roberto Jabali	2	6	7

Qualifying competition
(Australia) Todd Larkham	6	6
13	(Brazil) Roberto Jabali	1	3

==== Fourth qualifier ====
First round
4	(Hungary) Sándor Noszály	4	2
(Czech Republic) Radomír Vašek	6	6
(Italy) Corrado Borroni	6	6
(Switzerland) Alexandre Strambini	4	3
(Italy) Daniele Musa	4	7	7
(Austria) Rainer Falenti	6	5	5
(Netherlands) Hendrik Jan Davids	3	3
14	(France) Frédéric Fontang	6	6

Second round
(Czech Republic) Radomír Vašek	6	1	3
(Italy) Corrado Borroni	4	6	6
(Italy) Daniele Musa	3	6	4
14	(France) Frédéric Fontang	6	1	6

Qualifying competition
(Italy) Corrado Borroni	6	6
14	(France) Frédéric Fontang	2	2

==== Fifth qualifier ====
First round
5	(Sweden) Magnus Norman	6	6
(Italy) Pietro Pennisi	0	4
(France) Grégory Carraz	4	7	7
(Argentina) Sebastián Weisz	6	6	5
(Switzerland) Patrick Mohr	5	6	6
(Spain) Pepe Imaz	7	4	3
WC	(Italy) Massimo Valeri	7	4	4
11	(Argentina) Mariano Zabaleta	5	6	6

Second round
5	(Sweden) Magnus Norman	3	5
(France) Grégory Carraz	6	7
(Switzerland) Patrick Mohr	1	3
11	(Argentina) Mariano Zabaleta	6	6

Qualifying competition
(France) Grégory Carraz	2	6	6
11	(Argentina) Mariano Zabaleta	6	4	7

==== Sixth qualifier ====
First round
(Austria) Horst Skoff	6	6
(Switzerland) Valentin Frieden	4	1
(Argentina) Miguel Pastura	2	6	2
(Italy) Daniele Balducci	6	4	6
(Egypt) Tamer El-Sawy	6	6
(South Africa) David Adams	1	1
(France) Maxime Huard	6	3	1
12	(France) Daniel Courcol	3	6	6

Second round
(Austria) Horst Skoff	6	2	3
(Italy) Daniele Balducci	4	6	6
(Egypt) Tamer El-Sawy	6	6
12	(France) Daniel Courcol	0	3

Qualifying competition
(Italy) Daniele Balducci	6	4
(Egypt) Tamer El-Sawy	7	6

==== Seventh qualifier ====
First round
7	(Spain) Óscar Martínez	6	6
(Germany) Christian Vinck	3	4
(Italy) Davide Scala	3	3
(Italy) Vincenzo Santopadre	6	6
(Argentina) Francisco Yunis	2	2
(Italy) Giorgio Galimberti	6	6
(France) Jérôme Loustalot	2	6	6
10	(Italy) Laurence Tieleman	6	3	4

Second round
7	(Spain) Óscar Martínez	6	2	2
(Italy) Vincenzo Santopadre	3	6	6
(Italy) Giorgio Galimberti	6	3	6
(France) Jérôme Loustalot	2	6	1

Qualifying competition
(Italy) Vincenzo Santopadre	3	6	6
(Italy) Giorgio Galimberti	6	1	1

==== Eighth qualifier ====
First round
8	(Italy) Marco Meneschincheri	6	6
(France) Pier Gauthier	3	3
(Ecuador) Pablo Campana	0	4
(Italy) Carlo Santoro	6	6
WC	(Germany) Tommy Haas	7	6	7
(Spain) Marcos Górriz	6	7	6
(Italy) Davide Sanguinetti	3	6	4
9	(France) Thierry Guardiola	6	2	6

Second round
8	(Italy) Marco Meneschincheri	7	6
(Italy) Carlo Santoro	5	4
WC	(Germany) Tommy Haas	2	5
9	(France) Thierry Guardiola	6	7

Qualifying competition
8	(Italy) Marco Meneschincheri	4	6	6
9	(France) Thierry Guardiola	6	4	7
