= 1997 Italian Open (tennis) =

- Date: 5–11 May (women); 12–19 May (men)
- Edition: 54th
- Prize money: $2,050,000 (men) $926,250 (women)
- Surface: Clay / outdoor
- Location: Rome, Italy
- Venue: Foro Italico

Champions

Men's singles
- (Spain) Àlex Corretja

Women's singles
- (France) Mary Pierce

Men's doubles
- (The Bahamas) Mark Knowles / (Canada) Daniel Nestor

Women's doubles
- (United States) Nicole Arendt / (Netherlands) Manon Bollegraf
← 1996 ·	Italian Open	· 1998 →

The 1997 Italian Open was a tennis tournament played on outdoor clay courts. It was the 54th edition of the Italian Open and was part of the ATP Super 9 of the 1997 ATP Tour and of Tier I of the 1997 WTA Tour. Both the men's and women's events were held at the Foro Italico in Rome, Italy. The women's tournament was played from 5 May until 11 May 1997, and the men's tournament was played from 12 May until 19 May 1997. Àlex Corretja and Mary Pierce, who were both seeded tenth, won the singles titles.

== Finals ==
=== Men's singles ===
(Spain) Àlex Corretja defeated (Chile) Marcelo Ríos 7–5, 7–5, 6–3

- It was Corretja's 2nd singles title of the year and the 3rd of his career.

=== Women's singles ===
(France) Mary Pierce defeated (Spain) Conchita Martínez 6–4, 6–0

- It was Pierce's only singles title of the year and the 8th of her career.

=== Men's doubles ===
(The Bahamas) Mark Knowles / (Canada) Daniel Nestor defeated (Zimbabwe) Byron Black / (United States) Alex O'Brien 6–3, 4–6, 7–5

- It was Knowles' 2nd title of the year and the 11th of his career. It was Nestor's 2nd title of the year and the 8th of his career.

=== Women's doubles ===
(United States) Nicole Arendt / (Netherlands) Manon Bollegraf defeated (Spain) Conchita Martínez / (Argentina) Patricia Tarabini 6–2, 6–4

- It was Arendt's 2nd title of the year and the 11th of her career. It was Bollegraf's 3rd title of the year and the 26th of her career.
