= 1997 Italian Open – Men's singles =

Men's singles
- 1997 Italian Open

Final
- Champion: (Spain) Álex Corretja
- Runner-up: (Chile) Marcelo Ríos
- Score: 7–5, 7–5, 6–3

Details
- Draw: 64 (5WC/8Q)
- Seeds: 16

Events
Singles	men	women
Doubles	men	women
- Italian Open

Álex Corretja defeated Marcelo Ríos in the final, 7–5, 7–5, 6–3 to win the men's singles tennis title at the 1997 Italian Open.

Thomas Muster was the two-time defending champion, but lost in the second round to Scott Draper.

== Seeds ==
1. (United States) Pete Sampras (first round)
2. (United States) Michael Chang (first round)
3. (Austria) Thomas Muster (second round)
4. (Russia) Yevgeny Kafelnikov (third round)
5. (Netherlands) Richard Krajicek (second round)
6. (Croatia) Goran Ivanišević (semifinals)
7. (Chile) Marcelo Ríos (final)
8. (Spain) Carlos Moyà (third round)
9. (South Africa) Wayne Ferreira (first round)
10. (Spain) Álex Corretja (champion)
11. (Spain) Álbert Costa (third round)
12. (Germany) Boris Becker (third round)
13. (Spain) Félix Mantilla (first round)
14. (United Kingdom) Tim Henman (second round)
15. (Switzerland) Marc Rosset (third round)
16. (Australia) Mark Philippoussis (first round)

== Draw ==
Key

- Q = Qualifier
- WC = Wild card
- LL = Lucky loser
- Alt = Alternate
- ITF = ITF entry
- PR = Protected ranking
- SR = Special ranking
- SE = Special exempt
- JE = Junior exempt
- JR = Junior Accelerator Programme entrant
- CO = College Accelerator Programme entrant
- NG = Next Gen Accelerator Program entrant
- w/o = Walkover
- r = Retired
- d = Defaulted

=== Finals ===
Semifinals
7	(Chile) Marcelo Ríos	6	3	6
(Spain) Alberto Berasategui	3	6	1
6	(Croatia) Goran Ivanišević	6^{5}	6^{4}
10	(Spain) Álex Corretja	7^{7}	7^{7}

Final
7	(Chile) Marcelo Ríos	5	5	3
10	(Spain) Álex Corretja	7	7	6

=== Top half ===
==== Section 1 ====
First round
1	(United States) P Sampras	6^{5}	4
(United States) J Courier	7^{7}	6
Q	(Spain) A Portas	7^{9}	7^{7}
(United Kingdom) G Rusedski	6^{7}	6^{4}
(Spain) F Clavet	6	3	3
Q	(Spain) E Benfele Álvarez	4	6	6
Q	(France) J Golmard	5	4
15	(Switzerland) M Rosset	7	6
9	(South Africa) W Ferreira	6	5	6^{5}
(Sweden) M Larsson	4	7	7^{7}
(Sweden) T Johansson	5	6	6
Q	(Italy) D Sanguinetti	7	3	2
Q	(France) F Santoro	6	6
(Italy) R Furlan	4	1
WC	(Italy) O Camporese	3	5
7	(Chile) M Ríos	6	7

Second round
(United States) J Courier	7^{7}	6
Q	(Spain) A Portas	6^{5}	2
Q	(Spain) E Benfele Álvarez	5	7^{7}	3
15	(Switzerland) M Rosset	7	6^{3}	6
(Sweden) M Larsson	7^{7}	6
(Sweden) T Johansson	6^{4}	3
Q	(France) F Santoro	2	2
7	(Chile) M Ríos	6	6

Third round
(United States) J Courier	7^{7}	6
15	(Switzerland) M Rosset	6^{5}	3
(Sweden) M Larsson	6	5	4
7	(Chile) M Ríos	4	7	6

Quarterfinals
(United States) J Courier	3	6	6^{4}
7	(Chile) M Ríos	6	3	7^{7}

==== Section 2 ====
First round
4	(Russia) Y Kafelnikov	7	7^{7}
(Spain) J Sánchez	5	6^{5}
(Australia) T Woodbridge	5	1
(Netherlands) P Haarhuis	7	6
(Czech Republic) D Vacek	3	4
(Spain) A Berasategui	6	6
(Australia) P Rafter	6	3	6
13	(Spain) F Mantilla	1	6	4
11	(Spain) Á Costa	7	6
(Germany) A Rădulescu	5	2
(United States) J Tarango	5	3
(Netherlands) J Siemerink	7	6
(Germany) M-K Goellner	7^{7}	6
(United States) J Stark	6^{4}	4
WC	(Italy) D Nargiso	5	3
5	(Netherlands) R Krajicek	7	6

Second round
4	(Russia) Y Kafelnikov	7^{7}	3	6
(Netherlands) P Haarhuis	6^{5}	6	3
(Spain) A Berasategui	3	6	7
(Australia) P Rafter	6	4	5
11	(Spain) Á Costa	6	6
(Netherlands) J Siemerink	4	2
(Germany) M-K Goellner	7^{8}	7^{7}
5	(Netherlands) R Krajicek	6^{6}	6^{1}

Third round
4	(Russia) Y Kafelnikov	3	2
(Spain) A Berasategui	6	6
11	(Spain) Á Costa	4	6	4
(Germany) M-K Goellner	6	3	6

Quarterfinals
(Spain) A Berasategui	7	7
(Germany) M-K Goellner	5	5

=== Bottom half ===
==== Section 3 ====
First round
6	(Croatia) G Ivanišević	6	6^{8}	6
(Australia) M Woodforde	2	7^{10}	4
Q	(Denmark) F Fetterlein	4	5
(Norway) C Ruud	6	7
(France) C Pioline	6	6
(Zimbabwe) B Black	4	3
WC	(Italy) A Gaudenzi	6^{3}	2
12	(Germany) B Becker	7^{7}	6
14	(United Kingdom) T Henman	4	7	2
(Spain) R Carretero	6	5	0^{r}
Q	(Italy) D Scala	6	6^{3}	7^{7}
Q	(Italy) D Musa	4	7^{7}	6^{4}
(Australia) S Draper	7	6
(Ukraine) A Medvedev	5	3
WC	(Italy) M Martelli	3	2
3	(Austria) T Muster	6	6

Second round
6	(Croatia) G Ivanišević	6	6
(Norway) C Ruud	2	2
(France) C Pioline	4	5
12	(Germany) B Becker	6	7
14	(United Kingdom) T Henman	6	3	4
Q	(Italy) D Scala	1	6	6
(Australia) S Draper	7^{7}	5	7
3	(Austria) T Muster	6^{4}	7	5

Third round
6	(Croatia) G Ivanišević	7^{9}	6
12	(Germany) B Becker	6^{7}	3
Q	(Italy) D Scala	5	2
(Australia) S Draper	7	6

Quarterfinals
6	(Croatia) G Ivanišević	6	6
(Australia) S Draper	4	4

==== Section 4 ====
First round
8	(Spain) C Moyà	6	6
WC	(Italy) S Pescosolido	4	4
(Germany) T Haas	3	6	7
(Sweden) M Gustafsson	6	4	5
(France) A Boetsch	7^{7}	6
(United States) A O'Brien	6^{4}	4
(Morocco) H Arazi	0	3
10	(Spain) Á Corretja	6	6
16	(Australia) M Philippoussis	2	0
(Morocco) K Alami	6	6
(United States) C Woodruff	6	6
(Germany) D Prinosil	3	2
(Australia) S Stolle	1	4
(Spain) S Bruguera	6	6
(Argentina) H Gumy	6	6
2	(United States) M Chang	3	2

Second round
8	(Spain) C Moyà	6	6
(Germany) T Haas	4	2
(France) A Boetsch	2	3
10	(Spain) Á Corretja	6	6
(Morocco) K Alami	6	6
(United States) C Woodruff	0	4
(Spain) S Bruguera	6	6
(Argentina) H Gumy	1	4

Third round
8	(Spain) C Moyà	4	4
10	(Spain) Á Corretja	6	6
(Morocco) K Alami	3	6	7
(Spain) S Bruguera	6	2	5

Quarterfinals
10	(Spain) Á Corretja	4	7	6
(Morocco) K Alami	6	5	3

== Qualifying ==
=== Qualifying seeds ===
1. (France) Fabrice Santoro (qualified)
2. (France) Lionel Roux (qualifying competition)
3. (Spain) Albert Portas (qualified)
4. (Spain) Emilio Benfele Álvarez (qualified)
5. (Australia) Richard Fromberg (first round)
6. (Spain) Carlos Costa (first round)
7. (Argentina) Franco Squillari (qualifying competition)
8. (Germany) Nicolas Kiefer (first round)
9. (France) Jérôme Golmard (qualified)
10. (Germany) Martin Sinner (qualifying competition)
11. (Spain) Fernando Vicente (qualifying competition)
12. (Denmark) Frederik Fetterlein (qualified)
13. (Argentina) Gastón Etlis (qualifying competition)
14. (Argentina) Mariano Zabaleta (first round)
15. (France) Olivier Delaître (first round)
16. (Argentina) Guillermo Cañas (first round)

=== Qualifiers ===
1. (France) Fabrice Santoro
2. (Italy) Davide Sanguinetti
3. (Spain) Albert Portas
4. (Spain) Emilio Benfele Álvarez
5. (Denmark) Frederik Fetterlein
6. (Italy) Daniele Musa
7. (France) Jérôme Golmard
8. (Italy) Davide Scala

=== Qualifying draw ===
==== First qualifier ====
First round
1	(France) Fabrice Santoro	6	6
(Switzerland) Ivo Heuberger	0	3
WC	(Italy) Giorgio Galimberti	6	6
16	(Argentina) Guillermo Cañas	4	3

Qualifying competition
1	(France) Fabrice Santoro	6	6
WC	(Italy) Giorgio Galimberti	1	3

==== Second qualifier ====
First round
2	(France) Lionel Roux	6	6
(Italy) Mosé Navarra	2	1
(Italy) Davide Sanguinetti	6	7
15	(France) Olivier Delaître	3	5

Qualifying competition
2	(France) Lionel Roux	0	1
(Italy) Davide Sanguinetti	6	6

==== Third qualifier ====
First round
3	(Spain) Albert Portas	6	6
WC	(Italy) Stefano Tarallo	4	3
(United States) Jim Grabb	6	3	2
13	(Argentina) Gastón Etlis	3	6	6

Qualifying competition
3	(Spain) Albert Portas	7	6
13	(Argentina) Gastón Etlis	5	2

==== Fourth qualifier ====
First round
4	(Spain) Emilio Benfele Álvarez	6	6
(Italy) Gabrio Castrichella	3	1
(Spain) Jacobo Díaz	6	4	6
14	(Argentina) Mariano Zabaleta	4	6	3

Qualifying competition
4	(Spain) Emilio Benfele Álvarez	6	6
(Spain) Jacobo Díaz	2	3

==== Fifth qualifier ====
First round
5	(Australia) Richard Fromberg	7	2	3
(Australia) James Sekulov	5	6	6
(Italy) Cristiano Caratti	4	3
12	(Denmark) Frederik Fetterlein	6	6

Qualifying competition
(Australia) James Sekulov	2	1
12	(Denmark) Frederik Fetterlein	6	6

==== Sixth qualifier ====
First round
6	(Spain) Carlos Costa	3	4
(Italy) Daniele Musa	6	6
(Italy) Vincenzo Santopadre	5	6	4
11	(Spain) Fernando Vicente	7	4	6

Qualifying competition
(Italy) Daniele Musa	7	6
11	(Spain) Fernando Vicente	6	2

==== Seventh qualifier ====
First round
7	(Argentina) Franco Squillari	7	6
(Italy) Filippo Messori	5	0
WC	(Italy) Daniele Balducci	2	2
9	(France) Jérôme Golmard	6	6

Qualifying competition
7	(Argentina) Franco Squillari	4	2
9	(France) Jérôme Golmard	6	6

==== Eighth qualifier ====
First round
8	(Germany) Nicolas Kiefer	4	0
(Italy) Davide Scala	6	6
WC	(Italy) Florian Allgauer	5	5
10	(Germany) Martin Sinner	7	7

Qualifying competition
(Italy) Davide Scala	6	7
10	(Germany) Martin Sinner	2	5
