= Herbert Wiltschnig =

Austrian tennis player

- Full name: Herbert Wiltschnig
- Country (sports): Austria
- Born: 21 November 1975 (age 49); Klagenfurt, Austria
- Plays: Right-handed
- Prize money: $206,275

Singles
- Career record: 4–14
- Career titles: 0
- Highest ranking: No. 171 (15 May 2000)

Doubles
- Career record: 0–4
- Career titles: 0
- Highest ranking: No. 220 (7 July 2003)

Herbert Wiltschnig (born 21 November 1975) is a former professional tennis player from Austria.

== Biography ==
Wiltschnig, a right-handed player from Klagenfurt, featured in the boys' events at the French Open and Wimbledon in 1992. He turned professional in 1995.

Amongst his main draw appearances on the ATP Tour was the 1996 Italian Open, a top-tier event, now known as the Rome Masters. He also competed in seven editions of the Austrian Open Kitzbühel. As a doubles player he won Challenger titles in Brașov and Curitiba. As a veteran on the tennis circuit he played his last Futures tournament in 2011, on the verge of his 36th birthday.

== Challenger titles ==
=== Doubles: (2) ===
No.	Year	Tournament	Surface	Partner	Opponents	Score
1.	1997	Curitiba, Brazil	Clay	(United States) Glenn Weiner	(Argentina) Eduardo Medica (Argentina) Mariano Puerta	6–3, 6–4
2.	2002	Brașov, Romania	Clay	(Germany) Christopher Kas	(Spain) Rubén Ramírez Hidalgo (Spain) Santiago Ventura	5–7, 6–4, 7–5
