= Montauban Challenger =

Defunct tennis tournament
- Location: Montauban, France
- Category: ATP Challenger (1993–2007)
- Surface: Clay

The Montauban Challenger was a professional tennis tournament in France played on clay courts that was part of the ATP Challenger Series. It was held annually in Montauban from 1993 to 2007.

== Past finals ==
=== Singles ===
Year	Champion	Runner-up	Score
1993	(Norway) Christian Ruud	(Morocco) Younes El Aynaoui	6–7, 6–4, 7–6
1994	(Germany) Martin Sinner	(France) Pier Gauthier	7–6, 6–2
1995	(Belgium) Johan Van Herck	(Poland) Wojciech Kowalski	6–4, 4–6, 6–3
1996	(Romania) Andrei Pavel	(France) Stéphane Huet	6–4, 6–3
1997	(France) Olivier Mutis	(Austria) Horst Skoff	6–3, 7–6
1998	(Netherlands) Edwin Kempes	(Austria) Wolfgang Schranz	7–5, 6–3
1999	(Spain) Álex López Morón	(Portugal) Emanuel Couto	6–4, 4–6, 6–2
2000	(Monaco) Jean-René Lisnard	(Spain) Óscar Serrano	6–2, 6–0
2001	(Germany) Oliver Gross	(Spain) Julián Alonso	6–0, 4-1
2002	(France) Richard Gasquet	(Spain) Óscar Serrano	7–5, 6–1
2003	(Argentina) Juan Pablo Guzmán	(Algeria) Slimane Saoudi	6–3, 2–6, 6–1
2004	(Spain) Álex Calatrava	(Spain) Óscar Hernández	6–4, 1–6, 6–3
2005	(France) Édouard Roger-Vasselin	(Croatia) Roko Karanušić	6–4, 6–4
2006	(Algeria) Lamine Ouahab	(France) Marc Gicquel	7–5, 3–6, 7–6^{(2)}
2007	(Switzerland) Michael Lammer	(France) Thierry Ascione	1–6, 6–3, 7–6^{(4)}

=== Doubles ===
Year	Champions	Runners-up	Score
1993	(Croatia) Saša Hiršzon (Norway) Christian Ruud	(Italy) Massimo Cierro (Italy) Ugo Colombini	6–1, 6–2
1994	(Germany) Martin Sinner (Netherlands) Joost Winnink	(Italy) Nicola Bruno (Brazil) Otávio Della	7–5, 6–3
1995	(United States) Robert Devens (Egypt) Tamer El-Sawy	(South Africa) Clinton Ferreira (North Macedonia) Aleksandar Kitinov	7–5, 6–4
1996	(France) Gilles Bastié (Ivory Coast) Claude N'Goran	(South Africa) Clinton Ferreira (Romania) Andrei Pavel	6–4, 1–6, 7–6
1997	(Italy) Gabrio Castrichella (Italy) Daniele Musa	(Germany) Lars Rehmann (Hungary) Attila Sávolt	7–6, 2–6, 7–6
1998	(Spain) Eduardo Nicolás (Spain) Germán Puentes	(Netherlands) Edwin Kempes (Netherlands) Rogier Wassen	7–5, 7–5
1999	(Sweden) Simon Aspelin (Czech Republic) Ota Fukárek	(Lebanon) Ali Hamadeh (Netherlands) Rogier Wassen	6–3, 6–4
2000	(Australia) Lee Pearson (Australia) Grant Silcock	(Australia) Tim Crichton (Australia) Ashley Fisher	6–1, 6–4
2001	(Argentina) Diego del Río (Uzbekistan) Vadim Kutsenko	(Finland) Tuomas Ketola (Bulgaria) Orlin Stanoytchev	6–4, 6–2
2002	(Austria) Oliver Marach (Uzbekistan) Oleg Ogorodov	(Argentina) Federico Browne (Argentina) Cristian Kordasz	7–5, 7–6^{(3)}
2003	(Netherlands) Fred Hemmes Jr. (Netherlands) Rogier Wassen	(Argentina) Juan Pablo Guzmán (Argentina) Ignacio Hirigoyen	6–4, 6–4
2004	(Germany) Marc-Kevin Goellner (Spain) Álex López Morón	(Argentina) Brian Dabul (Argentina) Ignacio González King	6–3, 5–7, 7–6^{(5)}
2005	(Belgium) Steve Darcis (Belgium) Stefan Wauters	(Spain) Gabriel Trujillo Soler (Croatia) Lovro Zovko	6–4, 6–7^{(5)}, 6–4
2006	(Uruguay) Pablo Cuevas (Chile) Adrián García	(France) Marc Gicquel (France) Édouard Roger-Vasselin	6–3, 4–6, [10-8]
2007	(Spain) Marc Fornell (Spain) Gabriel Trujillo Soler	(Italy) Adriano Biasella (Monaco) Jean-René Lisnard	6–3, 7–5
