= 1996 Davis Cup World Group qualifying round =

The 1996 Davis Cup World Group qualifying round was held from 20 to 22 September. They were the main play-offs of the 1996 Davis Cup. The winners of the playoffs advanced to the 1997 Davis Cup World Group, and the losers were relegated to their respective Zonal Regions I.

== Teams ==
Bold indicates team had qualified for the 1997 Davis Cup World Group.

From World Group

- Austria
- Belgium
- Denmark
- Hungary
- **Mexico**
- **Netherlands**
- **Russia**
- **Switzerland**

From Americas Group I

- Argentina
- **Brazil**

From Asia/Oceania Group I

- **Australia**
- New Zealand

From Europe/Africa Group I

- Croatia
- Morocco
- **Romania**
- **Spain**

== Results summary ==
Date: 20–22 September

The eight losing teams in the World Group first round ties and eight winners of the Zonal Group I final round ties competed in the World Group qualifying round for spots in the 1997 World Group.

Home team	Score	Visiting team	Location	Venue	Door	Surface	Ref.
**Mexico**	3–2	Argentina	Mexico City	Club Alemán de México	Outdoor	Hard	
Croatia	1–4	**Australia**	Split	Teniski klub Split	Outdoor	Clay	
**Brazil**	4–1	Austria	São Paulo	Hotel Transamérica	Indoor	Carpet	
**Romania**	3–2	Belgium	Bucharest	Arenele BNR	Outdoor	Clay	
**Spain**	4–1	Denmark	Tarragona	Club de Tennis Tarragona	Outdoor	Clay	
**Russia**	4–1	Hungary	Moscow	Olympic Stadium	Indoor	Carpet	
**Switzerland**	5–0	Morocco	Olten	Olten Hallenstadion	Indoor	Carpet	
**Netherlands**	4–1	New Zealand	Haarlem	Sportclub Haarlem	Outdoor	Hard	

- Mexico, Netherlands, Russia and Switzerland remain in the World Group in 1997.
- Australia, Brazil, Romania and Spain are promoted to the World Group in 1997.
- Argentina, Croatia, Morocco and New Zealand remain in Zonal Group I in 1997.
- Austria, Belgium, Denmark and Hungary are relegated to Zonal Group I in 1997.

== Qualifying results ==
=== Mexico vs. Argentina ===
Mexico
3
Club Alemán de México, Mexico City, Mexico
20–22 September 1996
Hard

Argentina
2

			1	2	3	4	5
1	(Mexico) (Argentina)	**Alejandro Hernández**; Gastón Etlis	**7^{7}** 6^{5}	**6**; 2	**6**; 4
2	(Mexico) (Argentina)	Leonardo Lavalle; **Hernán Gumy**	6^{5} **7^{7}**	4; **6**	**6**; 4	**7**; 5	5; **7**
3	(Mexico) (Argentina)	**Alejandro Hernández / Óscar Ortiz**; Pablo Albano / Luis Lobo	6^{5} **7^{7}**	**6**; 4	3; **6**	**7^{7}** 6^{2}	**6**; 4
4	(Mexico) (Argentina)	**Alejandro Hernández**; Hernán Gumy	**6**; 4	**7**; 5	**6**; 1
5	(Mexico) (Argentina)	Leonardo Lavalle; **Gastón Etlis**	3; **6**	**6**; 3				**retired**

=== Croatia vs. Australia ===
Croatia
1
Teniski klub Split, Split, Croatia
20–22 September 1996
Clay

Australia
4

			1	2	3	4	5
1	(Croatia) (Australia)	Saša Hiršzon; **Mark Philippoussis**	2; **6**	3; **6**	2; **6**
2	(Croatia) (Australia)	Goran Ivanišević; **Jason Stoltenberg**	**6**; 4	3; **6**	**6**; 3	6^{5} **7^{7}**	2; **6**
3	(Croatia) (Australia)	Saša Hiršzon / Goran Ivanišević; **Pat Rafter / Mark Woodforde**	3; **6**	2; **6**	4; **6**
4	(Croatia) (Australia)	Goran Orešić; **Mark Philippoussis**	1; **6**	4; **6**
5	(Croatia) (Australia)	**Saša Hiršzon**; Jason Stoltenberg	**6**; 2	**6**; 2

=== Brazil vs. Austria ===
Brazil
4
Hotel Transamérica, São Paulo, Brazil
20–22 September 1996
Carpet (indoors)

Austria
1

			1	2	3	4	5
1	(Brazil) (Austria)	Fernando Meligeni; **Thomas Muster**	3; **6**	3; **6**	3; **6**
2	(Brazil) (Austria)	**Gustavo Kuerten**; Markus Hipfl	4; **6**	3; **6**	**7^{7}** 6^{0}	**7^{7}** 6^{5}	**6**; 1
3	(Brazil) (Austria)	**Gustavo Kuerten / Jaime Oncins**; Thomas Muster / Udo Plamberger	**7^{7}** 6^{2}	4; **6**	**6**; 3	3; **6**	**2**; 0
4	(Brazil) (Austria)	**Gustavo Kuerten**; Udo Plamberger						**w/o**
5	(Brazil) (Austria)	**Fernando Meligeni**; Markus Hipfl						**w/o**

=== Romania vs. Belgium ===
Romania
3
Arenele BNR, Bucharest, Romania
20–22 September 1996
Clay

Belgium
2

			1	2	3	4	5
1	(Romania) (Belgium)	Adrian Voinea; **Johan Van Herck**	**7^{8}** 6^{6}	4; **6**	2; **6**	1; **6**
2	(Romania) (Belgium)	**Andrei Pavel**; Filip Dewulf	**6**; 1	**6**; 3	**6**; 2
3	(Romania) (Belgium)	George Cosac / Dinu Pescariu; **Filip Dewulf / Libor Pimek**	**6**; 4	0; **6**	2; **6**	4; **6**
4	(Romania) (Belgium)	**Adrian Voinea**; Filip Dewulf	**6**; 0	**6**; 0	**6**; 2
5	(Romania) (Belgium)	**Andrei Pavel**; Johan Van Herck	**6**; 3	**6**; 4	**6**; 3

=== Spain vs. Denmark ===
Spain
4
Club de Tennis Tarragona, Tarragona, Spain
20–22 September 1996
Clay

Denmark
1

			1	2	3	4	5
1	(Spain) (Denmark)	**Albert Costa**; Frederik Fetterlein	**6**; 0	**6**; 0	**6**; 2
2	(Spain) (Denmark)	**Carlos Moyá**; Kenneth Carlsen	**6**; 1	**6**; 2	**6**; 1
3	(Spain) (Denmark)	**Tomás Carbonell / Àlex Corretja**; Kenneth Carlsen / Frederik Fetterlein	**6**; 4	**7**; 5	4; **6**	5; **7**	**6**; 3
4	(Spain) (Denmark)	Albert Costa; **Kenneth Carlsen**	**6**; 3	5; **7**	3; **6**
5	(Spain) (Denmark)	**Carlos Moyá**; Thomas Larsen	**6**; 3	**6**; 4

=== Russia vs. Hungary ===
Russia
4
Olympic Stadium, Moscow, Russia
20–22 September 1996
Carpet (indoors)

Hungary
1

			1	2	3	4	5
1	(Russia) (Hungary)	**Yevgeny Kafelnikov**; Attila Sávolt	**7**; 5	3; **6**	**6**; 3	**6**; 4
2	(Russia) (Hungary)	**Andrei Chesnokov**; József Krocskó	**6**; 2	**6**; 2	**6**; 2
3	(Russia) (Hungary)	**Yevgeny Kafelnikov / Andrei Olhovskiy**; Gábor Köves / Sándor Noszály	**7^{7}** 6^{2}	**6**; 3	**6**; 1
4	(Russia) (Hungary)	**Yevgeny Kafelnikov**; József Krocskó	**6**; 0	**6**; 3
5	(Russia) (Hungary)	Andrei Chesnokov; **Attila Sávolt**	3; **6**	2; **6**

=== Switzerland vs. Morocco ===
Switzerland
5
Olten Hallenstadion, Olten, Switzerland
20–22 September 1996
Carpet (indoors)

Morocco
0

			1	2	3	4	5
1	(Switzerland) (Morocco)	**Jakob Hlasek**; Mehdi Tahiri	0; **6**	**6**; 3	**6**; 2	**7**; 5
2	(Switzerland) (Morocco)	**Marc Rosset**; Mounir El Aarej	**6**; 0	**6**; 1	**6**; 3
3	(Switzerland) (Morocco)	**Jakob Hlasek / Marc Rosset**; Mounir El Aarej / Mehdi Tahiri	**6**; 2	**6**; 2	**6**; 0
4	(Switzerland) (Morocco)	**Marc Rosset**; Mehdi Tahiri	3; **6**	**6**; 3	**6**; 1
5	(Switzerland) (Morocco)	**Jakob Hlasek**; Larbi Rharnit	**6**; 0	**6**; 1

=== Netherlands vs. New Zealand ===
Netherlands
4
Sportclub Haarlem, Haarlem, Netherlands
20–22 September 1996
Hard

New Zealand
1

			1	2	3	4	5
1	(Netherlands) (New Zealand)	**Jan Siemerink**; Brett Steven	6^{4} **7^{7}**	**7^{7}** 6^{2}	**6**; 3	3; **6**	**6**; 2
2	(Netherlands) (New Zealand)	Richard Krajicek; **Alistair Hunt**	6^{5} **7^{7}**	**6**; 3	**6**; 4	1; 4		**retired**
3	(Netherlands) (New Zealand)	**Sjeng Schalken / Jan Siemerink**; Alistair Hunt / Brett Steven	3; **6**	**7^{8}** 6^{6}	**6**; 4	**6**; 2
4	(Netherlands) (New Zealand)	**Sjeng Schalken**; James Greenhalgh	**7**; 5	**6**; 1	6^{5} **7^{7}**	**6**; 1
5	(Netherlands) (New Zealand)	**Dennis van Scheppingen**; Alistair Hunt	3; **6**	**6**; 3	**7^{8}** 6^{6}
