= 1996 Italian Open – Men's doubles =

Men's doubles
- 1996 Italian Open

Final
- Champions: (Zimbabwe) Byron Black (Canada) Grant Connell
- Runners-up: (Belgium) Libor Pimek (South Africa) Byron Talbot
- Score: 6–2, 6–3

Details
- Draw: 32
- Seeds: 8

Events
Singles	men	women
Doubles	men	women
- Italian Open

Cyril Suk and Daniel Vacek were the defending champions but they competed with different partners that year, Suk with Hendrik Jan Davids and Vacek with Richey Reneberg.

Davids and Suk lost in the first round to Mark Keil and Peter Nyborg, as did Reneberg and Vacek to Emilio Sánchez and Christo van Rensburg.

Byron Black and Grant Connell won in the final 6–2, 6–3 against Libor Pimek and Byron Talbot.

== Seeds ==
1. (The Bahamas) Mark Knowles / (Canada) Daniel Nestor (first round)
2. (United States) Patrick Galbraith / (Russia) Andrei Olhovskiy (semifinals)
3. (Zimbabwe) Byron Black / (Canada) Grant Connell (champions)
4. (South Africa) Ellis Ferreira / (Netherlands) Jan Siemerink (semifinals)
5. (France) Guy Forget / (Switzerland) Jakob Hlasek (first round)
6. (United States) Todd Martin / (United States) Alex O'Brien (second round)
7. (Argentina) Luis Lobo / (Spain) Javier Sánchez (quarterfinals)
8. (Spain) Tomás Carbonell / (Spain) Francisco Roig (first round)

== Draw ==
Key

- Q = Qualifier
- WC = Wild card
- LL = Lucky loser
- Alt = Alternate
- ITF = ITF entry
- PR = Protected ranking
- SR = Special ranking
- SE = Special exempt
- JE = Junior exempt
- JR = Junior Accelerator Programme entrant
- CO = College Accelerator Programme entrant
- NG = Next Gen Accelerator Program entrant
- w/o = Walkover
- r = Retired
- d = Defaulted

=== Final ===
Semifinals
(Belgium) Libor Pimek (South Africa) Byron Talbot	6	6	6
4	(South Africa) Ellis Ferreira (Netherlands) Jan Siemerink	4	7	3
3	(Zimbabwe) Byron Black (Canada) Grant Connell	6	4
2	(United States) Patrick Galbraith (Russia) Andrei Olhovskiy	4	3^{r}

Final
(Belgium) Libor Pimek (South Africa) Byron Talbot	2	3
3	(Zimbabwe) Byron Black (Canada) Grant Connell	6	6

=== Top half ===
First round
1	(The Bahamas) M Knowles (Canada) D Nestor	6	3	6
(United States) K Kinnear (United States) D Randall	3	6	7
(Italy) A Gaudenzi (Croatia) G Ivanišević	7	4	6
(South Africa) D Adams (Australia) W Arthurs	5	6	1
(Netherlands) P Haarhuis (Netherlands) S Schalken	6	6	6
WC	(Italy) O Camporese (Italy) D Nargiso	4	7	4
(Belgium) L Pimek (South Africa) B Talbot	6	3	6
8	(Spain) T Carbonell (Spain) F Roig	4	6	4
4	(South Africa) E Ferreira (Netherlands) J Siemerink	6	3	6
Q	(Spain) J Arrese (South Africa) B Haygarth	3	6	1
(Netherlands) H J Davids (Czech Republic) C Suk	6	4
(United States) M Keil (Sweden) P Nyborg	7	6
Q	(United States) K Jones (Netherlands) S Noteboom	6	3	6
(United States) T Kronemann (Australia) D Macpherson	4	6	3
(Australia) J Eagle (Australia) A Florent	2	7	6
5	(France) G Forget (Switzerland) J Hlasek	6	6	4

Second round
(United States) K Kinnear (United States) D Randall	7	6	6
(Italy) A Gaudenzi (Croatia) G Ivanišević	6	7	4
(Netherlands) P Haarhuis (Netherlands) S Schalken	6	2	6
(Belgium) L Pimek (South Africa) B Talbot	4	6	7
4	(South Africa) E Ferreira (Netherlands) J Siemerink	6	6	6
(United States) M Keil (Sweden) P Nyborg	7	4	3
Q	(United States) K Jones (Netherlands) S Noteboom	1	6
(Australia) J Eagle (Australia) A Florent	6	7

Quarterfinals
(United States) K Kinnear (United States) D Randall	5	6
(Belgium) L Pimek (South Africa) B Talbot	7	7
4	(South Africa) E Ferreira (Netherlands) J Siemerink	7	7
(Australia) J Eagle (Australia) A Florent	5	5

Semifinals
(Belgium) L Pimek (South Africa) B Talbot	6	6	6
4	(South Africa) E Ferreira (Netherlands) J Siemerink	4	7	3

=== Bottom half ===
First round
6	(United States) T Martin (United States) A O'Brien	7	6
(United Kingdom) N Broad (South Africa) P Norval	5	4
(South Africa) W Ferreira (Russia) Y Kafelnikov	6	6
(South Africa) J-L de Jager (Australia) M Philippoussis	3	4
(Netherlands) T Nijssen (Netherlands) M Oosting	1	4
(Sweden) S Edberg (Czech Republic) P Korda	6	6
WC	(Italy) C Brandi (Italy) C Caratti	3	4
3	(Zimbabwe) B Black (Canada) G Connell	6	6
7	(Argentina) L Lobo (Spain) J Sánchez	6	6	7
WC	(France) A Boetsch (Switzerland) M Rosset	3	7	6
(South Africa) M Barnard (United States) G Van Emburgh	6	6
WC	(Chile) M Ríos (United States) M Washington	4	4
(United States) R Reneberg (Czech Republic) D Vacek	4	2
(Spain) E Sánchez (South Africa) C van Rensburg	6	6
(Netherlands) T Kempers (United States) J Waite	3	2
2	(United States) P Galbraith (Russia) A Olhovskiy	6	6

Second round
6	(United States) T Martin (United States) A O'Brien	4	6	5
(South Africa) W Ferreira (Russia) Y Kafelnikov	6	2	7
(Sweden) S Edberg (Czech Republic) P Korda	3	6	4
3	(Zimbabwe) B Black (Canada) G Connell	6	3	6
7	(Argentina) L Lobo (Spain) J Sánchez	6	6	6
(South Africa) M Barnard (United States) G Van Emburgh	2	7	3
(Spain) E Sánchez (South Africa) C van Rensburg	7	3	5
2	(United States) P Galbraith (Russia) A Olhovskiy	5	6	7

Quarterfinals
(South Africa) W Ferreira (Russia) Y Kafelnikov	5	2
3	(Zimbabwe) B Black (Canada) G Connell	7	6
7	(Argentina) L Lobo (Spain) J Sánchez	6	4	4
2	(United States) P Galbraith (Russia) A Olhovskiy	3	6	6

Semifinals
3	(Zimbabwe) B Black (Canada) G Connell	6	4
2	(United States) P Galbraith (Russia) A Olhovskiy	4	3^{r}

== Qualifying ==
=== Seeds ===
1. (Spain) Jordi Arrese / (South Africa) Brent Haygarth (qualified)
2. (United States) Kelly Jones / (Netherlands) Stephen Noteboom (qualified)
3. (Spain) Emilio Benfele Álvarez / (Spain) Pepe Imaz (first round)
4. (Australia) Ben Ellwood / (Australia) Todd Larkham (first round)

=== Qualifiers ===
1. (Spain) Jordi Arrese / (South Africa) Brent Haygarth
2. (United States) Kelly Jones / (Netherlands) Stephen Noteboom

=== Qualifying draw ===
==== First qualifier ====
First round				Qualifying competition
1	(Spain) Jordi Arrese (South Africa) Brent Haygarth	6	7
WC	(Italy) Giorgio Galimberti (Italy) Igor Gaudi	4	6	1	(Spain) Jordi Arrese (South Africa) Brent Haygarth	6	3	7
WC	(Spain) Alberto Berasategui (Spain) Albert Costa	7	6	WC	(Spain) Alberto Berasategui (Spain) Albert Costa	4	6	5
4	(Australia) Ben Ellwood (Australia) Todd Larkham	5	4

==== Second qualifier ====
First round				Qualifying competition
2	(United States) Kelly Jones (Netherlands) Stephen Noteboom	6	6
	(Czech Republic) Vojtěch Flégl (Slovakia) Karol Kučera	4	2	2	(United States) Kelly Jones (Netherlands) Stephen Noteboom	6	4	6
WC	(Germany) Tommy Haas (Argentina) Mariano Zabaleta	6	6	WC	(Germany) Tommy Haas (Argentina) Mariano Zabaleta	2	6	3
3	(Spain) Emilio Benfele Álvarez (Spain) Pepe Imaz	3	2
