= 1997 Italian Open – Women's doubles =

Women's doubles
- 1997 Italian Open
- 1996 Champions: (Spain) Arantxa Sánchez Vicario (Romania) Irina Spîrlea

Final
- Champions: (United States) Nicole Arendt (Netherlands) Manon Bollegraf
- Runners-up: (Spain) Conchita Martínez (Argentina) Patricia Tarabini
- Score: 6–2, 6–4

Details
- Draw: 28
- Seeds: 8

Events
Singles	men	women
Doubles	men	women
← 1996 ·	Italian Open	· 1998 →

Arantxa Sánchez Vicario and Irina Spîrlea were the defending champions but only Spîrlea competed that year with Gigi Fernández.

Fernández and Spîrlea lost in the quarterfinals to Nicole Arendt and Manon Bollegraf.

Arendt and Bollegraf won in the final 6–2, 6–4 against Conchita Martínez and Patricia Tarabini.

== Seeds ==
Champion seeds are indicated in bold text while text in italics indicates the round in which those seeds were eliminated. The top four seeded teams received byes into the second round.

1. (Latvia) Larisa Savchenko / (Czech Republic) Helena Suková (second round)
2. (United States) **Nicole Arendt** / (Netherlands) **Manon Bollegraf (champions)**
3. (France) Alexandra Fusai / (France) Nathalie Tauziat (quarterfinals)
4. (Indonesia) Yayuk Basuki / (Netherlands) Caroline Vis (semifinals)
5. (United States) Gigi Fernández / (Romania) Irina Spîrlea (quarterfinals)
6. (Spain) Conchita Martínez / (Argentina) Patricia Tarabini (final)
7. (Belgium) Sabine Appelmans / (Netherlands) Miriam Oremans (second round)
8. (France) Alexia Dechaume-Balleret / (France) Sandrine Testud (first round)

== Draw ==
=== Key ===
- Q = Qualifier
- WC = Wild card
- LL = Lucky loser
- Alt = Alternate
- ITF = ITF entry
- PR = Protected ranking
- SR = Special ranking
- SE = Special exempt
- JE = Junior exempt
- JR = Junior Accelerator Programme entrant
- CO = College Accelerator Programme entrant
- NG = Next Gen Accelerator Program entrant
- w/o = Walkover
- r = Retired
- d = Defaulted

=== Finals ===
Final
6	(Spain) Conchita Martínez (Argentina) Patricia Tarabini	2	4
2	(United States) **Nicole Arendt** (Netherlands) **Manon Bollegraf**	**6**	**6**

=== Top half ===
First round
(Russia) **A Kournikova** (Russia) **E Likhovtseva**	**6**	**6**
LL	(Argentina) B Fulco-Villella (Australia) L Pleming	2	0
(Austria) **B Schett** (Switzerland) **P Schnyder**	**6**	**6**
(Argentina) I Gorrochategui (Italy) F Perfetti	3	3
(United States) C Rubin (Netherlands) B Schultz-McCarthy	4	**7**	4
7	(Belgium) **S Appelmans** (Netherlands) **M Oremans**	**6**	5	**6**
(United States) **A Grossman** (Slovakia) **K Habšudová**	**6**	**6**
(Japan) M Saeki (Chinese Taipei) S-T Wang	3	3
(Japan) **R Hiraki** (Argentina) **F Labat**	3	**6**	**6**
(Croatia) M Murić (Poland) A Olsza	**6**	2	3
(Romania) R Dragomir (Croatia) I Majoli	4	**7**	4
6	(Spain) **C Martínez** (Argentina) **P Tarabini**	**6**	5	**6**

Second round
1	(Latvia) L Savchenko (Czech Republic) H Suková	**7**	2	5
(Russia) **A Kournikova** (Russia) **E Likhovtseva**	6	**6**	**7**
(Austria) **B Schett** (Switzerland) **P Schnyder**	**6**	5	**7**
7	(Belgium) S Appelmans (Netherlands) M Oremans	1	**7**	5
3	(France) **A Fusai** (France) **N Tauziat**	**6**	**6**
(United States) A Grossman (Slovakia) K Habšudová	3	4
(Japan) R Hiraki (Argentina) F Labat	2	1
6	(Spain) **C Martínez** (Argentina) **P Tarabini**	**6**	**6**

Quarterfinals
(Russia) **A Kournikova** (Russia) **E Likhovtseva**	**7**	**6**
(Austria) B Schett (Switzerland) P Schnyder	6	4
3	(France) A Fusai (France) N Tauziat	2	3
6	(Spain) **C Martínez** (Argentina) **P Tarabini**	**6**	**6**

Semifinals
(Russia) A Kournikova (Russia) E Likhovtseva	6	3
6	(Spain) **C Martínez** (Argentina) **P Tarabini**	**7**	**6**

=== Bottom half ===
First round
8	(France) A Dechaume-Balleret (France) S Testud	**6**	4	5
(Argentina) **P Suárez** (Belgium) **D Van Roost**	3	**6**	**7**
(South Africa) **A Coetzer** (France) **M Pierce**	**6**	**6**
(Australia) A Ellwood (Australia) R McQuillan	2	0
(Belgium) **E Callens** (France) **A-G Sidot**	**6**
(Argentina) L Montalvo (Slovakia) H Nagyová	2	r
5	(United States) **G Fernández** (Romania) **I Spîrlea**	**6**	**6**
Q	(Japan) A Sugiyama (Japan) Y Yoshida	1	4
(Italy) A Canepa (Italy) G Casoni	0	**6**	2
(Italy) **S Cecchini** (Italy) **L Garrone**	**6**	4	**6**
(United States) C Morariu (Argentina) M Paz	**6**	5	3
(United States) **D Graham** (Italy) **R Grande**	2	**7**	**6**

Second round
(Argentina) **P Suárez** (Belgium) **D Van Roost**	**6**	**6**
(South Africa) A Coetzer (France) M Pierce	2	4
(Belgium) E Callens (France) A-G Sidot	4	2
4	(Indonesia) **Y Basuki** (Netherlands) **C Vis**	**6**	**6**
5	(United States) **G Fernández** (Romania) **I Spîrlea**	**6**	4	**6**
(Italy) S Cecchini (Italy) L Garrone	1	**6**	2
(United States) D Graham (Italy) R Grande	3	1
2	(United States) **N Arendt** (Netherlands) **M Bollegraf**	**6**	**6**

Quarterfinals
(Argentina) P Suárez (Belgium) D Van Roost	6	4
4	(Indonesia) **Y Basuki** (Netherlands) **C Vis**	**7**	**6**
5	(United States) G Fernández (Romania) I Spîrlea	4	**6**	5
2	(United States) **N Arendt** (Netherlands) **M Bollegraf**	**6**	3	**7**

Semifinals
4	(Indonesia) Y Basuki (Netherlands) C Vis	2	6
2	(United States) **N Arendt** (Netherlands) **M Bollegraf**	**6**	**7**
