= 1996 Italian Open – Women's singles =

Women's singles
- 1996 Italian Open

Final
- Champion: (Spain) Conchita Martínez
- Runner-up: (Switzerland) Martina Hingis
- Score: 6–2, 6–3

Details
- Draw: 56
- Seeds: 16

Events
| Singles | men | women |
| Doubles | men | women |
| ← 1995 · | Italian Open | · 1997 → |

Three-time defending champion Conchita Martínez defeated Martina Hingis in the final, 6–2, 6–3 to win the women's singles tennis title at the 1996 Italian Open.

== Seeds ==
A champion seed is indicated in bold text while text in italics indicates the round in which that seed was eliminated. The top eight seeds received a bye to the second round.

1. (Germany) Steffi Graf (quarterfinals)
2. (Spain) **Conchita Martínez (champion)**
3. (Spain) Arantxa Sánchez Vicario (quarterfinals)
4. (Croatia) Iva Majoli (semifinals)
5. (Bulgaria) Magdalena Maleeva (quarterfinals)
6. (Switzerland) Martina Hingis (final)
7. (Romania) Irina Spîrlea (semifinals)
8. (France) Nathalie Tauziat (quarterfinals)
9. (Austria) Judith Wiesner (third round)
10. (Germany) Petra Begerow (first round)
11. (Indonesia) Yayuk Basuki (second round)
12. (France) Sandrine Testud (third round)
13. (United States) Lindsay Lee (second round)
14. (South Africa) Joannette Kruger (second round)
15. (Argentina) Florencia Labat (first round)
16. (Austria) Barbara Schett (third round)

== Draw ==
=== Key ===
- Q = Qualifier
- WC = Wild card
- LL = Lucky loser
- Alt = Alternate
- ITF = ITF entry
- PR = Protected ranking
- SR = Special ranking
- SE = Special exempt
- JE = Junior exempt
- JR = Junior Accelerator Programme entrant
- CO = College Accelerator Programme entrant
- NG = Next Gen Accelerator Program entrant
- w/o = Walkover
- r = Retired
- d = Defaulted

=== Finals ===
Semifinals
6 | (Switzerland) **Martina Hingis** | **6** | **7**
7 | (Romania) Irina Spîrlea | 2 | 5
4 | (Croatia) Iva Majoli | 4 | **7** | 2
2 | (Spain) **Conchita Martínez** | **6** | 6 | **6**

Final
6 | (Switzerland) Martina Hingis | 2 | 3
2 | (Spain) **Conchita Martínez** | **6** | **6**

=== Top half ===
==== Section 1 ====
First round
(France) **A Dechaume-Balleret** | **7** | **6**
(United States) K Rinaldi-Stunkel | 6 | 1
(Argentina) **P Suárez** | **7** | **6**
(Italy) L Golarsa | 6 | 1
(Germany) **J Kandarr** | **7** | 6 | **6**
15 | (Argentina) F Labat | 6 | **7** | 3
10 | (Germany) P Begerow | 2 | **6** | 4
WC | (Italy) **G Pizzichini** | **6** | 2 | **6**
(Italy) **S Cecchini** | **6** | **6**
(Israel) A Smashnova | 4 | 3
(Italy) R Grande | 4 | 3
(Spain) **V Ruano-Pascual** | **6** | **6**

Second round
1 | (Germany) **S Graf** | **6** | **7**
(France) A Dechaume-Balleret | 3 | 6
(Argentina) **P Suárez** | **6** | **6**
(Germany) J Kandarr | 2 | 2
WC | (Italy) G Pizzichini | 4 | 4
(Italy) **S Cecchini** | **6** | **6**
(Spain) V Ruano-Pascual | 3 | 1
6 | (Switzerland) **M Hingis** | **6** | **6**

Third round
1 | (Germany) **S Graf** | **6** | **6**
(Argentina) P Suárez | 2 | 4
(Italy) S Cecchini | 2 | 3
6 | (Switzerland) **M Hingis** | **6** | **6**

Quarterfinals
1 | (Germany) S Graf | **6** | 2 | 3
6 | (Switzerland) **M Hingis** | 2 | **6** | **6**

==== Section 2 ====
First round
Q | (Canada) R Simpson | 4 | 5
(France) **A Fusai** | **6** | **7**
Q | (Argentina) **B Fulco-Villella** | **6** | **6**
(Italy) N Baudone | 3 | 2
(Slovakia) H Nagyová | 6 | 5
11 | (Indonesia) **Y Basuki** | **7** | **7**
14 | (South Africa) **J Kruger** | **6** | 1 | **6**
(Argentina) M-J Gaidano | 4 | **6** | 1
(Slovakia) **K Habšudová** | **6** | **6**
Q | (Italy) F Fortuni | 1 | 1
WC | (Italy) G Boschiero | 5 | **6** | 3
(Slovakia) **R Zrubáková** | **7** | 2 | **6**

Second round
3 | (Spain) **A Sánchez Vicario** | **6** | **6**
(France) A Fusai | 2 | 3
Q | (Argentina) **B Fulco-Villella** | **6** | **6**
11 | (Indonesia) Y Basuki | 2 | 3
14 | (South Africa) J Kruger | 2 | 3
(Slovakia) **K Habšudová** | **7** | **6**
(Slovakia) R Zrubáková | 3 | 2
7 | (Romania) **I Spîrlea** | **6** | **6**

Third round
3 | (Spain) **A Sánchez Vicario** | **7** | **6**
Q | (Argentina) B Fulco-Villella | 6 | 3
(Slovakia) K Habšudová | 4 | 2
7 | (Romania) **I Spîrlea** | **6** | **6**

Quarterfinals
3 | (Spain) A Sánchez Vicario | 4 | 3
7 | (Romania) **I Spîrlea** | **6** | **6**

=== Bottom half ===
==== Section 3 ====
First round
(Canada) P Hy-Boulais | 4 | 4
(Poland) **M Grzybowska** | **6** | **6**
(Poland) **K Nowak** | **7** | **6**
(Germany) V Martinek | 5 | 2
(France) L Ghirardi | 2 | 3
16 | (Austria) **B Schett** | **6** | **6**
13 | (United States) **L Lee** | 1 | **6** | **6**
(United States) S Cacic | **6** | 2 | 4
(Italy) **F Perfetti** | **6** | **7**
(Germany) S Meier | 1 | 5
(Czech Republic) L Richterová | **6** | 3 | 6
(Spain) **G León García** | 4 | **6** | **7**

Second round
8 | (France) **N Tauziat** | **6** | **6**
(Poland) M Grzybowska | 1 | 1
(Poland) K Nowak | 0 | 5
16 | (Austria) **B Schett** | **6** | **7**
13 | (United States) L Lee | **7** | 4 | 2
(Italy) **F Perfetti** | 5 | **6** | **6**
(Spain) G León García | **7** | 4 | 2
4 | (Croatia) **I Majoli** | 6 | **6** | **6**

Third round
8 | (France) **N Tauziat** | **6** | 0 | **6**
16 | (Austria) B Schett | 3 | **6** | 0
(Italy) F Perfetti | 2 | 4
4 | (Croatia) **I Majoli** | **6** | **6**

Quarterfinals
8 | (France) N Tauziat | 4 | 1
4 | (Croatia) **I Majoli** | **6** | **6**

==== Section 4 ====
First round
(Spain) **M Sánchez Lorenzo** | **6** | **6**
(United States) S Stafford | 3 | 3
WC | (Italy) L Garrone | 4 | 3
(Italy) **F Lubiani** | **6** | **6**
Q | (Italy) G Casoni | 2 | 2
9 | (Austria) **J Wiesner** | **6** | **6**
12 | (France) **S Testud** | **6** | 4 | **6**
(Italy) A Serra Zanetti | 4 | **6** | 4
(Netherlands) P Kamstra | 6 | 3
LL | (Canada) **S Jeyaseelan** | **7** | **6**
(United States) J Watanabe | 6 | 0
(Federal Republic of Yugoslavia) **T Ječmenica** | **7** | **6**

Second round
5 | (Bulgaria) **M Maleeva** | **6** | **6**
(Spain) M Sánchez Lorenzo | 1 | 3
(Italy) F Lubiani | 4 | 1
9 | (Austria) **J Wiesner** | **6** | **6**
12 | (France) **S Testud** | **6** | **6**
LL | (Canada) S Jeyaseelan | 4 | 3
(Federal Republic of Yugoslavia) T Ječmenica | 3 | 2
2 | (Spain) **C Martínez** | **6** | **6**

Third round
5 | (Bulgaria) **M Maleeva** | 6 | **6** | **6**
9 | (Austria) J Wiesner | **7** | 1 | 4
12 | (France) S Testud | 0 | 1
2 | (Spain) **C Martínez** | **6** | **6**

Quarterfinals
5 | (Bulgaria) M Maleeva | 1 | **6** | 1
2 | (Spain) **C Martínez** | **6** | 2 | **6**
