= 1996 Italian Open – Women's doubles =

Women's doubles
- 1996 Italian Open
- 1995 Champions: (United States) Gigi Fernandez (Belarus) Natasha Zvereva

Final
- Champions: (Spain) Arantxa Sánchez Vicario (Romania) Irina Spîrlea
- Runners-up: (United States) Gigi Fernández (Switzerland) Martina Hingis
- Score: 6–4, 3–6, 6–3

Details
- Draw: 28
- Seeds: 8

Events
Singles	men	women
Doubles	men	women
← 1995 ·	Italian Open	· 1997 →

Gigi Fernández and Natasha Zvereva were the defending champions but did not compete that year.

Arantxa Sánchez Vicario and Irina Spîrlea won in the final 6–4, 3–6, 6–3 against Gigi Fernández and Martina Hingis.

== Seeds ==
Champion seeds are indicated in bold text while text in italics indicates the round in which those seeds were eliminated. The top four seeded teams received byes into the second round.

1. (Spain) **Arantxa Sánchez Vicario** / (Romania) **Irina Spîrlea (champions)**
2. (United States) Gigi Fernández / (Switzerland) Martina Hingis (final)
3. (Spain) Conchita Martínez / (Argentina) Patricia Tarabini (semifinals)
4. (Italy) Laura Golarsa / (France) Nathalie Tauziat (quarterfinals)
5. (Canada) Jill Hetherington / (Australia) Kristine Radford (second round)
6. (Indonesia) Yayuk Basuki / (Netherlands) Caroline Vis (quarterfinals)
7. (France) Alexia Dechaume-Balleret / (France) Sandrine Testud (semifinals)
8. (France) Alexandra Fusai / (Canada) Patricia Hy-Boulais (second round)

== Draw ==
=== Key ===
- Q = Qualifier
- WC = Wild card
- LL = Lucky loser
- Alt = Alternate
- ITF = ITF entry
- PR = Protected ranking
- SR = Special ranking
- SE = Special exempt
- JE = Junior exempt
- JR = Junior Accelerator Programme entrant
- CO = College Accelerator Programme entrant
- NG = Next Gen Accelerator Program entrant
- w/o = Walkover
- r = Retired
- d = Defaulted

=== Finals ===
Final
1	(Spain) **Arantxa Sánchez Vicario** (Romania) **Irina Spîrlea**	**6**	3	**6**
2	(United States) Gigi Fernández (Switzerland) Martina Hingis	4	**6**	3

=== Top half ===
First round
(Italy) A Canepa (Italy) G Casoni	**6**	3	2
(Argentina) **F Labat** (Argentina) **M Paz**	3	**6**	**6**
(Canada) R Simpson (United States) S Stafford	3	2
WC	(Italy) **R Grande** (Italy) **A Serra Zanetti**	**6**	**6**
(South Africa) J Kruger (Slovakia) H Nagyová	5	**6**	2
5	(Canada) **J Hetherington** (Australia) **K Radford**	**7**	3	**6**
WC	(Italy) F Lubiani (Italy) M P Zavagli	6	3
(Germany) **V Martinek** (Czech Republic) **L Richterová**	**7**	**6**
(United States) S Cacic (United States) J Watanabe	4	2
(France) **L Ghirardi** (Canada) **S Jeyaseelan**	**6**	**6**
(Slovakia) K Habšudová (Slovakia) R Zrubáková	3	6
7	(France) **A Dechaume-Balleret** (France) **S Testud**	**6**	**7**

Second round
1	(Spain) **A Sánchez Vicario** (Romania) **I Spîrlea**	2	**6**	**6**
(Argentina) F Labat (Argentina) M Paz	**6**	2	3
WC	(Italy) **R Grande** (Italy) **A Serra Zanetti**	5	**6**	**6**
5	(Canada) J Hetherington (Australia) K Radford	**7**	3	4
4	(Italy) **L Golarsa** (France) **N Tauziat**	**6**	**6**
(Germany) V Martinek (Czech Republic) L Richterová	2	3
(France) L Ghirardi (Canada) S Jeyaseelan	2	**6**	3
7	(France) **A Dechaume-Balleret** (France) **S Testud**	**6**	4	**6**

Quarterfinals
1	(Spain) **A Sánchez Vicario** (Romania) **I Spîrlea**	**7**	**6**
WC	(Italy) R Grande (Italy) A Serra Zanetti	6	0
4	(Italy) L Golarsa (France) N Tauziat	4	3
7	(France) **A Dechaume-Balleret** (France) **S Testud**	**6**	**6**

Semifinals
1	(Spain) **A Sánchez Vicario** (Romania) **I Spîrlea**	6	**7**	**7**
7	(France) A Dechaume-Balleret (France) S Testud	**7**	6	5

=== Bottom half ===
First round
8	(France) **A Fusai** (Canada) **P Hy-Boulais**	**6**	**7**
(Italy) F Perfetti (Italy) G Pizzichini	1	5
(Argentina) B Fulco-Villella (Spain) V Ruano-Pascual	0	2
(Italy) **S Cecchini** (Italy) **L Garrone**	**6**	**6**
(Poland) M Grzybowska (Federal Republic of Yugoslavia) T Ječmenica	0	2
(United States) **L Lee** (Germany) **C Schneider**	**6**	**6**
6	(Indonesia) **Y Basuki** (Netherlands) **C Vis**	**6**	**6**
(Netherlands) P Kamstra (Slovenia) T Križan	0	2
(Italy) E Brusati (Italy) C Salvi	0	0
(Argentina) **L Montalvo** (Argentina) **P Suárez**	**6**	**6**
Q	(Venezuela) **M Mazzotta** (Spain) **M Sánchez Lorenzo**	4	**7**	**6**
(Spain) G León García (Spain) S Ramón-Cortés	**6**	6	4

Second round
8	(France) A Fusai (Canada) P Hy-Boulais	6	5
(Italy) **S Cecchini** (Italy) **L Garrone**	**7**	**7**
(United States) L Lee (Germany) C Schneider	**7**	1	1
3	(Spain) **C Martínez** (Argentina) **P Tarabini**	5	**6**	**6**
6	(Indonesia) **Y Basuki** (Netherlands) **C Vis**	**6**	**6**
(Argentina) L Montalvo (Argentina) P Suárez	0	2
Q	(Venezuela) M Mazzotta (Spain) M Sánchez Lorenzo	1	**6**	2
2	(United States) **G Fernández** (Switzerland) **M Hingis**	**6**	4	**6**

Quarterfinals
(Italy) S Cecchini (Italy) L Garrone	4	2
3	(Spain) **C Martínez** (Argentina) **P Tarabini**	**6**	**6**
6	(Indonesia) Y Basuki (Netherlands) C Vis	2	2
2	(United States) **G Fernández** (Switzerland) **M Hingis**	**6**	**6**

Semifinals
3	(Spain) C Martínez (Argentina) P Tarabini	1	1
2	(United States) **G Fernández** (Switzerland) **M Hingis**	**6**	**6**
