= 1997 Italian Open – Women's singles =

Women's singles
- 1997 Italian Open

Final
- Champion: (France) Mary Pierce
- Runner-up: (Spain) Conchita Martínez
- Score: 6–4, 6–0

Details
- Draw: 56
- Seeds: 16

Events
Singles	men	women
Doubles	men	women
← 1996 ·	Italian Open	· 1998 →

Mary Pierce defeated the four-time defending champion Conchita Martínez in the final, 6–4, 6–0 to win the women's singles tennis title at the 1997 Italian Open.

== Seeds ==
A champion seed is indicated in bold text while text in italics indicates the round in which that seed was eliminated. The top eight seeds received a bye to the second round.

1. (United States) Monica Seles (third round)
2. (Spain) Arantxa Sánchez Vicario (quarterfinals)
3. (Spain) Conchita Martínez (final)
4. (Germany) Anke Huber (second round)
5. (Croatia) Iva Majoli (third round)
6. (South Africa) Amanda Coetzer (third round)
7. (Romania) Irina Spîrlea (quarterfinals)
8. (Slovakia) Karina Habšudová (third round)
9. (Netherlands) Brenda Schultz-McCarthy (second round)
10. (France) **Mary Pierce (champion)**
11. (Austria) Barbara Paulus (semifinals)
12. (Russia) Elena Likhovtseva (third round)
13. (Belgium) Sabine Appelmans (third round)
14. (Romania) Ruxandra Dragomir (quarterfinals)
15. (France) Nathalie Tauziat (second round)
16. (France) Sandrine Testud (second round)

== Draw ==
=== Key ===
- Q = Qualifier
- WC = Wild card
- LL = Lucky loser
- Alt = Alternate
- ITF = ITF entry
- PR = Protected ranking
- SR = Special ranking
- SE = Special exempt
- JE = Junior exempt
- JR = Junior Accelerator Programme entrant
- CO = College Accelerator Programme entrant
- NG = Next Gen Accelerator Program entrant
- w/o = Walkover
- r = Retired
- d = Defaulted

=== Finals ===
Semifinals
10	(France) **Mary Pierce**	4	**6**	**6**
11	(Austria) Barbara Paulus	**6**	3	1
3	(Spain) **Conchita Martínez**	**6**	**6**
(Switzerland) Patty Schnyder	2	2

Final
10	(France) **Mary Pierce**	**6**	**6**
3	(Spain) Conchita Martínez	4	0

=== Top half ===
==== Section 1 ====
First round
Q	(Czech Republic) S Kleinová	**6**	2	5
(Austria) **B Schett**	4	**6**	**7**
(Thailand) T Tanasugarn	4	3
Q	(United States) **A Grossman**	**6**	**6**
WC	(Italy) S Cecchini	1	1
10	(France) **M Pierce**	**6**	**6**
14	(Romania) **R Dragomir**	**6**	**6**
Q	(Italy) A Canepa	3	0
(Australia) A Ellwood	4	**6**	4
(Belgium) **E Callens**	**6**	3	**6**
WC	(Italy) L Golarsa	3	2
Q	(United States) **N Arendt**	**6**	**6**

Second round
1	(United States) **M Seles**	**7**	**6**
(Austria) B Schett	5	0
Q	(United States) A Grossman	2	2
10	(France) **M Pierce**	**6**	**6**
14	(Romania) **R Dragomir**	3	**6**	**6**
(Belgium) E Callens	**6**	2	0
Q	(United States) N Arendt	6	**6**	3
5	(Croatia) **I Majoli**	**7**	4	**6**

Third round
1	(United States) M Seles	6	6
10	(France) **M Pierce**	**7**	**7**
14	(Romania) **R Dragomir**	4	**6**	**6**
5	(Croatia) I Majoli	**6**	4	3

Quarterfinals
10	(France) **M Pierce**	**6**	**6**
14	(Romania) R Dragomir	3	4

==== Section 2 ====
First round
WC	(Italy) **F Lubiani**	**6**	**6**
(Czech Republic) D Chládková	2	4
(Czech Republic) **A Gerši**	**7**	**6**
Q	(Argentina) M Díaz Oliva	5	3
Q	(Puerto Rico) K Brandi	**6**	3	5
11	(Austria) **B Paulus**	3	**6**	**7**
15	(France) **N Tauziat**	**6**	**6**
(Czech Republic) H Suková	4	2
(Belgium) **D Van Roost**	**6**	**6**
(Germany) P Begerow	3	0
Q	(Spain) **C Torrens Valero**	2	**6**	**6**
(France) S Pitkowski	**6**	3	3

Second round
4	(Germany) A Huber	2	2
WC	(Italy) **F Lubiani**	**6**	**6**
(Czech Republic) A Gerši	1	3
11	(Austria) **B Paulus**	**6**	**6**
15	(France) N Tauziat	**7**	1	2
(Belgium) **D Van Roost**	6	**6**	**6**
Q	(Spain) C Torrens Valero	5	6
7	(Romania) **I Spîrlea**	**7**	**7**

Third round
WC	(Italy) F Lubiani	2	1
11	(Austria) **B Paulus**	**6**	**6**
(Belgium) D Van Roost	1	3
7	(Romania) **I Spîrlea**	**6**	**6**

Quarterfinals
11	(Austria) **B Paulus**	**6**	**6**
7	(Romania) I Spîrlea	4	2

=== Bottom half ===
==== Section 3 ====
First round
(Argentina) **F Labat**	**6**	**7**
Q	(Belarus) O Barabanschikova	1	6
(South Africa) **J Kruger**	**6**	**6**
(Japan) A Sugiyama	3	2
(Slovakia) H Nagyová	3	4
9	(Netherlands) **B Schultz-McCarthy**	**6**	**6**
12	(Russia) **E Likhovtseva**	**6**	**6**
(France) A-G Sidot	4	3
(Latvia) **L Savchenko**	**6**	3	**6**
(Italy) F Perfetti	2	**6**	2
(United States) **C Rubin**	**7**	**6**
(United States) J Capriati	6	2

Second round
8	(Slovakia) **K Habšudová**	**6**	**6**
(Argentina) F Labat	4	3
(South Africa) **J Kruger**	**6**	**7**
9	(Netherlands) B Schultz-McCarthy	2	5
12	(Russia) **E Likhovtseva**	**6**	**6**
(Latvia) L Savchenko	3	3
(United States) C Rubin	2	3
3	(Spain) **C Martínez**	**6**	**6**

Third round
8	(Slovakia) K Habšudová	2	4
(South Africa) **J Kruger**	**6**	**6**
12	(Russia) E Likhovtseva	2	1
3	(Spain) **C Martínez**	**6**	**6**

Quarterfinals
(South Africa) J Kruger	0	4
3	(Spain) **C Martínez**	**6**	**6**

==== Section 4 ====
First round
(Russia) **A Kournikova**	**6**	**6**
(Chinese Taipei) S-T Wang	4	3
(Indonesia) Y Basuki	0	1
(Switzerland) **P Schnyder**	**6**	**6**
(Netherlands) M Oremans	3	**6**	6
16	(France) **S Testud**	**6**	3	**7**
13	(Belgium) **S Appelmans**	**6**	**6**
(Japan) N Sawamatsu	3	1
(France) A Fusai	**6**	2	5
(Italy) **G Pizzichini**	3	**6**	**7**
(Argentina) **P Suárez**	**7**	**7**
(Slovakia) K Studeníková	5	6

Second round
6	(South Africa) **A Coetzer**	**6**	4	**6**
(Russia) A Kournikova	2	**6**	1
(Switzerland) **P Schnyder**	**7**	**6**
16	(France) S Testud	6	0
13	(Belgium) **S Appelmans**	**6**	**6**
(Italy) G Pizzichini	4	3
(Argentina) P Suárez	2	2
2	(Spain) **A Sánchez Vicario**	**6**	**6**

Third round
6	(South Africa) A Coetzer	6	5
(Switzerland) **P Schnyder**	**7**	**7**
13	(Belgium) S Appelmans	3	4
2	(Spain) **A Sánchez Vicario**	**6**	**6**

Quarterfinals
(Switzerland) **P Schnyder**	**6**	**6**
2	(Spain) A Sánchez Vicario	1	1
