= Robert Devens =

American tennis player

- Full name: Robert Devens, Jr.
- Country (sports): United States
- Born: May 20, 1972 (age 54) New York City, U.S.
- Plays: Right-handed

Singles
- Career record: 115-160
- Highest ranking: No. 386 (Jul 31, 1995)

Doubles
- Career record: 15-19
- Highest ranking: No. 133 (Sep 11, 1995)

Robert Devens, Jr. (born May 20, 1972) is an American former professional tennis player.

Born in New York City, Devens played collegiate tennis for Stanford University and was a member of the 1992 NCAA championship team. He competed briefly on the professional tour and earned a top-200 ranking in doubles. As a doubles player he had an ATP Tour main draw appearance at Kitzbühel in 1995 and won one ATP Challenger title.

== ATP Challenger finals ==
=== Doubles: 1 (1–0) ===
Result	No.	Date	Tournament	Surface	Partner	Opponents	Score
Win	1.	Jul 1995	Montauban, France	Clay	(Egypt) Tamer El-Sawy	(South Africa) Clinton Ferreira (North Macedonia) Aleksandar Kitinov	7–5, 6–4
