= 2001 Energis Open =

- Date: 16–22 July
- Edition: 44th
- Category: ATP International Series
- Draw: 32S / 16D
- Prize money: $375,000
- Surface: Clay / outdoor
- Location: Amsterdam, Netherlands

Champions

Singles
- (Spain) Àlex Corretja

Doubles
- (Netherlands) Paul Haarhuis / (Netherlands) Sjeng Schalken
← 2000 ·	Dutch Open	· 2002 →

The 2001 Energis Open was a men's tennis tournament played on outdoor clay courts in Amsterdam, Netherlands and was part of the International Series of the 2001 ATP Tour. It was the 44th edition of the tournament and was held from 16 July until 22 July 2001. Second-seeded Àlex Corretja won the singles title.

== Finals ==
=== Singles ===
(Spain) Àlex Corretja defeated (Morocco) Younes El Aynaoui 6–3, 5–7, 7–6^{(7–0)}, 3–6, 6–4

- It was Corretja's 1st singles title of the year and the 15th of his career.

=== Doubles ===
(Netherlands) Paul Haarhuis / (Netherlands) Sjeng Schalken defeated (Spain) Àlex Corretja / (Argentina) Luis Lobo 6–4, 6–2

- It was Haarhuis' 3rd title of the year and the 54th of his career. It was Schalken's 3rd title of the year and the 11th of his career.
