= 2001 Energis Open – Singles =

Singles
- 2001 Energis Open

Final
- Champion: (Spain) Àlex Corretja
- Runner-up: (Morocco) Younes El Aynaoui
- Score: 6–3, 5–7, 7–6^{(7–0)}, 3–6, 6–4

Events
Singles	Doubles
- Energis Open

The 2001 Energis Open tennis tournament was played in Amsterdam, Netherlands in July 2001.

Magnus Gustafsson was the defending singles champion but lost in the semifinals to Younes El Aynaoui.

Àlex Corretja won in the final 6–3, 5–7, 7–6^{(7–0)}, 3–6, 6–4 against El Aynaoui.

== Seeds ==
1. (France) Sébastien Grosjean (first round)
2. (Spain) Àlex Corretja (champion)
3. (Netherlands) Sjeng Schalken (semifinals)
4. (Spain) Álex Calatrava (quarterfinals)
5. (Russia) Mikhail Youzhny (second round)
6. (Sweden) Magnus Gustafsson (semifinals)
7. (Belgium) Olivier Rochus (quarterfinals)
8. (Switzerland) Michel Kratochvil (first round)

== Draw ==
Key

- Q = Qualifier
- WC = Wild card
- LL = Lucky loser
- Alt = Alternate
- ITF = ITF entry
- PR = Protected ranking
- SR = Special ranking
- SE = Special exempt
- JE = Junior exempt
- JR = Junior Accelerator Programme entrant
- CO = College Accelerator Programme entrant
- NG = Next Gen Accelerator Program entrant
- w/o = Walkover
- r = Retired
- d = Defaulted

=== Finals ===
Semifinals
(Morocco) Younes El Aynaoui	6	7
6	(Sweden) M Gustafsson	4	5
3	(Netherlands) S Schalken	6^{4}	1
2	(Spain) Àlex Corretja	7^{7}	6

Final
(Morocco) Younes El Aynaoui	3	7	6^{0}	6	4
2	(Spain) Àlex Corretja	6	5	7^{7}	3	6

=== Section 1 ===
First round
1	(France) S Grosjean	4	4
Q	(Argentina) J I Chela	6	6
(Russia) N Davydenko	6	6
(Belgium) D Norman	3	3
(Morocco) Y El Aynaoui	6	7^{7}
Q	(Netherlands) D van Scheppingen	1	6^{4}
(Argentina) M Zabaleta	6^{6}	6	1
5	(Russia) M Youzhny	7^{8}	4	6
4	(Spain) Á Calatrava	6	6
(Germany) A Popp	1	2
(Netherlands) E Kempes	4	7^{7}	6
(Netherlands) R Sluiter	6	6^{4}	3
(Netherlands) P Wessels	3	4
Q	(Costa Rica) J A Marín	6	6
WC	(Netherlands) J van Lottum	1	6	2
6	(Sweden) M Gustafsson	6	4	6

Second round
Q	(Argentina) J I Chela	6	6
(Russia) N Davydenko	2	4
(Morocco) Y El Aynaoui	6	6
5	(Russia) M Youzhny	2	3
4	(Spain) Á Calatrava	4	6	6
(Netherlands) E Kempes	6	3	3
Q	(Costa Rica) J A Marín	6^{4}	3
6	(Sweden) M Gustafsson	7^{7}	6

Quarterfinals
Q	(Argentina) J I Chela	6^{4}	6	5
(Morocco) Y El Aynaoui	7^{7}	4	7
4	(Spain) Á Calatrava	7	4	4
6	(Sweden) M Gustafsson	5	6	6

Semifinals
(Morocco) Y El Aynaoui	6	7
6	(Sweden) M Gustafsson	4	5

=== Section 2 ===
First round
WC/7	(Belgium) O Rochus	3	7^{7}	7
(Brazil) A Simoni	6	6^{5}	5
SE	(United Kingdom) M Lee	6	6
(Morocco) K Alami	4	0
(Netherlands) J Siemerink	6^{5}	7^{10}	6
(Brazil) A Sá	7^{7}	6^{8}	4
(Belgium) C Rochus	3	4
3	(Netherlands) S Schalken	6	6
8	(Switzerland) M Kratochvil	4	3
(Russia) A Stoliarov	6	6
(Germany) J Knippschild	7^{7}	6
(Thailand) P Srichaphan	6^{4}	4
Q	(France) O Mutis	6	2	6
WC	(Netherlands) M Verkerk	1	6	3
(Brazil) F Meligeni	5	4
2	(Spain) À Corretja	7	6

Second round
WC/7	(Belgium) O Rochus	6	6
SE	(United Kingdom) M Lee	4	0
(Netherlands) J Siemerink	6	4	4
3	(Netherlands) S Schalken	3	6	6
(Russia) A Stoliarov	7^{7}	6
(Germany) J Knippschild	6^{2}	1
Q	(France) O Mutis	2	6	4
2	(Spain) À Corretja	6	4	6

Quarterfinals
WC/7	(Belgium) O Rochus	2	6	1
3	(Netherlands) S Schalken	6	2	6
(Russia) A Stoliarov	3	5
2	(Spain) À Corretja	6	7

Semifinals
3	(Netherlands) S Schalken	6^{4}	1
2	(Spain) À Corretja	7^{7}	6
