= 1996 Italian Open (tennis) =

Tennis tournament

- Date: 6–12 May (women); 13–19 May (men)
- Edition: 53rd
- Prize money: $1,950,000 (men) $926,250 (women)
- Surface: Clay / outdoor
- Location: Rome, Italy
- Venue: Foro Italico

Champions

Men's singles
- (Austria) Thomas Muster

Women's singles
- (Spain) Conchita Martínez

Men's doubles
- (Zimbabwe) Byron Black / (Canada) Grant Connell

Women's doubles
- (Spain) Arantxa Sánchez Vicario / (Romania) Irina Spîrlea
← 1995 ·	Italian Open	· 1997 →

The 1996 Italian Open was a tennis tournament played on outdoor clay courts. It was the 53rd edition of the Italian Open and was part of the Mercedes Super 9 of the 1996 ATP Tour and of Tier I of the 1996 WTA Tour. Both the men's and women's events took place at the Foro Italico in Rome, Italy. The women's tournament was played from 6 May through 12 May 1996, while the men's tournament was played from 13 May through 19 May 1996.

The men's tournament was headlined by ATP No. 2 and defending champion Thomas Muster, Goran Ivanišević and Yevgeny Kafelnikov. The women's field was led by WTA No. 1 Steffi Graf, defending champion Conchita Martínez and Arantxa Sánchez Vicario.

First-seeded Thomas Muster and second-seeded Conchita Martínez won the singles titles. It was Muster's third title at the event, having also won in 1990 and 1995. It was Martínez's fourth title at the event, having also won in 1993, 1994 and 1995.

== Finals ==
=== Men's singles ===
(Austria) Thomas Muster defeated (Netherlands) Richard Krajicek 6–2, 6–4, 3–6, 6–3

- It was Muster's 5th singles title of the year and the 40th of his career.

=== Women's singles ===
(Spain) Conchita Martínez defeated (Switzerland) Martina Hingis 6–2, 6–3

- It was Martinez's 1st singles title of the year and her 27th of her career.

=== Men's doubles ===
(Zimbabwe) Byron Black / (Canada) Grant Connell defeated (Belgium) Libor Pimek / (South Africa) Byron Talbot 6–2, 6–3

- It was Black's 3rd title of the year and the 15th of his career. It was Connell's 2nd title of the year and the 19th of his career.

=== Women's doubles ===
(Spain) Arantxa Sánchez Vicario / (Romania) Irina Spîrlea defeated (United States) Gigi Fernández / (Switzerland) Martina Hingis 6–4, 3–6, 6–3

- It was Sánchez Vicario's 8th title of the year and the 70th of her career. It was Spîrlea's 2nd title of the year and the 6th of her career.
