= 2001 Energis Open – Doubles =

Doubles
- 2001 Energis Open

Final
- Champions: (Netherlands) Paul Haarhuis (Netherlands) Sjeng Schalken
- Runners-up: (Spain) Àlex Corretja (Argentina) Luis Lobo
- Score: 6–4, 6–2

Events
Singles	Doubles
← 2000 ·	Energis Open	· 2002 →

Sergio Roitman and Andrés Schneiter were the defending champions but did not compete that year.

Paul Haarhuis and Sjeng Schalken won in the final 6–4, 6–2 against Àlex Corretja and Luis Lobo.

== Seeds ==
1. (Netherlands) Paul Haarhuis / (Netherlands) Sjeng Schalken (champions)
2. (Argentina) Mariano Hood / (Argentina) Sebastián Prieto (first round)
3. (United States) Jack Waite / (South Africa) Jason Weir-Smith (first round)
4. (Argentina) Gastón Etlis / (Argentina) Martín Rodríguez (semifinals)

== Draw ==
=== Key ===
- Q = Qualifier
- WC = Wild card
- LL = Lucky loser
- Alt = Alternate
- SE = Special exempt
- PR = Protected ranking
- ITF = ITF entry
- JE = Junior exempt
- w/o = Walkover
- r = Retired
- d = Defaulted
- SR = Special ranking

First round
1	(Netherlands) P Haarhuis (Netherlands) S Schalken	4	6	6
(Spain) Á López Morón (Spain) J Velasco Jr.	6	3	1
WC	(Netherlands) E Kempes (Netherlands) D van Scheppingen	7^{7}	6
(United States) D Bowen (Australia) A Fisher	6^{4}	4
4	(Argentina) G Etlis (Argentina) M Rodríguez	7^{7}	7
(Switzerland) M Kratochvil (Russia) M Youzhny	6^{1}	5
(Australia) T Crichton (Australia) P Tramacchi	6^{4}	1
(Germany) K Braasch (Germany) J Knippschild	7^{7}	6
(Brazil) A Sá (Brazil) A Simoni	6	6
(United States) H Armando (Georgia (country)) I Labadze	1	2
WC	(Spain) À Corretja (Argentina) L Lobo	6	3	6
3	(United States) J Waite (South Africa) J Weir-Smith	3	6	3
(United States) B Coupe (Australia) P Kilderry	7^{7}	4	4
(South Africa) R Koenig (The Bahamas) M Merklein	6^{2}	6	6
WC	(Netherlands) J Siemerink (Netherlands) J van Lottum	7^{7}	7^{7}
2	(Argentina) M Hood (Argentina) S Prieto	6^{4}	6^{5}

Quarterfinals
1	(Netherlands) P Haarhuis (Netherlands) S Schalken	6	6
WC	(Netherlands) E Kempes (Netherlands) D van Scheppingen	3	4
4	(Argentina) G Etlis (Argentina) M Rodríguez	6	6
(Germany) K Braasch (Germany) J Knippschild	3	4
(Brazil) A Sá (Brazil) A Simoni	6^{9}	2
WC	(Spain) À Corretja (Argentina) L Lobo	7^{11}	6
(South Africa) R Koenig (The Bahamas) M Merklein	6	7^{7}
WC	(Netherlands) J Siemerink (Netherlands) J van Lottum	3	6^{5}

Semifinals
1	(Netherlands) P Haarhuis (Netherlands) S Schalken	6	6^{2}	6
4	(Argentina) G Etlis (Argentina) M Rodríguez	3	7^{7}	4
WC	(Spain) À Corretja (Argentina) L Lobo	6	3	6
(South Africa) R Koenig (The Bahamas) M Merklein	2	6	3

Final
1	(Netherlands) P Haarhuis (Netherlands) S Schalken	6	6
WC	(Spain) À Corretja (Argentina) L Lobo	4	2
