= 1997 Italian Open – Men's doubles =

Men's doubles
- 1997 Italian Open

Final
- Champions: (The Bahamas) Mark Knowles (Canada) Daniel Nestor
- Runners-up: (Zimbabwe) Byron Black (United States) Alex O'Brien
- Score: 6–3, 4–6, 7–5

Details
- Draw: 32
- Seeds: 8

Events
Singles	men	women
Doubles	men	women
- Italian Open

Byron Black and Grant Connell were the defending champions, but competed this year with different partners.

Connell teamed up with Jim Grabb and lost in second round to David Adams and Andrei Olhovskiy.

Black teamed up with Alex O'Brien and lost in the final 6–3, 4–6, 7–5 against Mark Knowles and Daniel Nestor.

== Seeds ==
1. (Australia) Todd Woodbridge / (Australia) Mark Woodforde (first round)
2. (Netherlands) Jacco Eltingh / (Netherlands) Paul Haarhuis (second round)
3. (The Bahamas) Mark Knowles / (Canada) Daniel Nestor (champions)
4. (Russia) Yevgeny Kafelnikov / (Czech Republic) Daniel Vacek (second round)
5. (Zimbabwe) Byron Black / (United States) Alex O'Brien (final)
6. (South Africa) Ellis Ferreira / (United States) Patrick Galbraith (second round)
7. (United States) Rick Leach / (United States) Jonathan Stark (semifinals)
8. (South Africa) David Adams / (Russia) Andrei Olhovskiy (quarterfinals)

== Draw ==
Key

- Q = Qualifier
- WC = Wild card
- LL = Lucky loser
- Alt = Alternate
- ITF = ITF entry
- PR = Protected ranking
- SR = Special ranking
- SE = Special exempt
- JE = Junior exempt
- JR = Junior Accelerator Programme entrant
- CO = College Accelerator Programme entrant
- NG = Next Gen Accelerator Program entrant
- w/o = Walkover
- r = Retired
- d = Defaulted

=== Finals ===
Semifinals
7	(United States) Rick Leach (United States) Jonathan Stark	5	2
5	(Zimbabwe) Byron Black (United States) Alex O'Brien	7	6
3	(The Bahamas) Mark Knowles (Canada) Daniel Nestor	7	7
(Australia) Sandon Stolle (Czech Republic) Cyril Suk	6	6

Final
5	(Zimbabwe) Byron Black (United States) Alex O'Brien	3	6	5
3	(The Bahamas) Mark Knowles (Canada) Daniel Nestor	6	4	7

=== Top half ===
First round
1	(Australia) T Woodbridge (Australia) M Woodforde	3	5
(Argentina) P Albano (Spain) À Corretja	6	7
(South Africa) G Muller (United States) J Tarango	6	4	6
(Netherlands) M Oosting (Netherlands) J Siemerink	4	6	4
(United Kingdom) N Broad (South Africa) P Norval	5	6
(Australia) J Eagle (Australia) A Florent	7	7
(Sweden) D Ekerot (Sweden) P Nyborg	6	4	3
7	(United States) R Leach (United States) J Stark	4	6	6
4	(Russia) Y Kafelnikov (Czech Republic) D Vacek	6	6
(South Africa) M Barnard (Netherlands) HJ Davids	3	4
(Argentina) L Lobo (Spain) J Sánchez	7	6	6
(United States) S Melville (Netherlands) F Wibier	6	7	2
(France) O Delaître (France) F Santoro	6	6
Q	(Italy) M Martelli (Italy) D Sanguinetti	2	4
(United States) D Johnson (United States) F Montana	5	3
5	(Zimbabwe) B Black (United States) A O'Brien	7	6

Second round
(Argentina) P Albano (Spain) À Corretja	6	6	4
(South Africa) G Muller (United States) J Tarango	7	4	6
(Australia) J Eagle (Australia) A Florent	3	4
7	(United States) R Leach (United States) J Stark	6	6
4	(Russia) Y Kafelnikov (Czech Republic) D Vacek	4	6	3
(Argentina) L Lobo (Spain) J Sánchez	6	3	6
(France) O Delaître (France) F Santoro	3	2
5	(Zimbabwe) B Black (United States) A O'Brien	6	6

Quarterfinals
(South Africa) G Muller (United States) J Tarango	3	4
7	(United States) R Leach (United States) J Stark	6	6
(Argentina) L Lobo (Spain) J Sánchez	4	0
5	(Zimbabwe) B Black (United States) A O'Brien	6	6

Semifinals
7	(United States) R Leach (United States) J Stark	5	2
5	(Zimbabwe) B Black (United States) A O'Brien	7	6

=== Bottom half ===
First round
6	(South Africa) E Ferreira (United States) P Galbraith	6	6
(Australia) P Kilderry (Czech Republic) P Vízner	3	4
(Australia) M Philippoussis (Australia) P Rafter	7	6
(Netherlands) T Nijssen (United States) J Waite	6	4
(United States) T Kronemann (Australia) D Macpherson	6	3
Q	(Italy) C Brandi (Italy) F Messori	7	6
(Belgium) L Pimek (South Africa) B Talbot	4	6	3
3	(The Bahamas) M Knowles (Canada) D Nestor	6	2	6
8	(South Africa) D Adams (Russia) A Olhovskiy	6	6
WC	(United States) J Courier (Italy) A Gaudenzi	3	4
(Canada) G Connell (United States) J Grabb	6	3	7
WC	(Italy) O Camporese (Italy) D Nargiso	1	6	6
(Czech Republic) C Suk (Australia) S Stolle	7	7
WC	(Croatia) S Hiršzon (Croatia) G Ivanišević	6	5
WC	(Ukraine) A Medvedev (Chile) M Ríos	6	1
2	(Netherlands) J Eltingh (Netherlands) P Haarhuis	7	6

Second round
6	(South Africa) E Ferreira (United States) P Galbraith	3	3
(Australia) M Philippoussis (Australia) P Rafter	6	6
Q	(Italy) C Brandi (Italy) F Messori	7	2	2
3	(The Bahamas) M Knowles (Canada) D Nestor	6	6	6
8	(South Africa) D Adams (Russia) A Olhovskiy	5	6	7
(Canada) G Connell (United States) J Grabb	7	4	6
(Czech Republic) C Suk (Australia) S Stolle	6	7
2	(Netherlands) J Eltingh (Netherlands) P Haarhuis	4	5

Quarterfinals
(Australia) M Philippoussis (Australia) P Rafter	3	6
3	(The Bahamas) M Knowles (Canada) D Nestor	6	7
8	(South Africa) D Adams (Russia) A Olhovskiy	5	2
(Czech Republic) C Suk (Australia) S Stolle	7	6

Semifinals
3	(The Bahamas) M Knowles (Canada) D Nestor	7	7
(Czech Republic) C Suk (Australia) S Stolle	6	6
