= 1997 Davis Cup World Group =

- Date: 7 February – 30 November
- Edition: 17th

Champions
- Sweden
- Davis Cup

The World Group was the highest level of Davis Cup competition in 1997. The first-round losers went into the Davis Cup World Group qualifying round, and the winners progressed to the quarterfinals and were guaranteed a World Group spot for 1998.

France were the defending champions, but were eliminated in the first round.

Sweden won the title, defeating the United States in the final, 5–0. The final was held at the Scandinavium in Gothenburg, Sweden, from 28 to 30 November. It was the Swedish team's 6th Davis Cup title overall.

== Participating teams ==
Participating teams
Australia	Brazil	Czech Republic	France
Germany	India	Italy	Mexico
Netherlands	Romania	Russia	South Africa
Spain	Sweden	Switzerland	United States

== Draw ==
First round 7–9 February
Ribeirão Preto, Brazil (clay)
United States	4
Brazil	1
Bucharest, Romania (indoor hard)
Netherlands	3
Romania	2
Sydney, Australia (grass)
France	1
Australia	4
Příbram, Czech Republic (indoor clay)
Czech Republic	3
India	2
Rome, Italy (clay)
Mexico	1
Italy	4
Mallorca, Spain (clay)
Spain	4
Germany	1
Durban, South Africa (hard)
South Africa	3
Russia	1
Luleå, Sweden (indoor hard)
Switzerland	1
Sweden	4

Quarterfinals; 4–6 April
Newport Beach, CA, United States (hard)
United States	4
Netherlands	1
Adelaide, Australia (grass)
Australia	5
Czech Republic	0
Pesaro, Italy (indoor carpet)
Italy	4
Spain	1
Växjö, Sweden (indoor carpet)
South Africa	2
Sweden	3

Semifinals; 19–21 September
Washington, DC, United States (hard)
United States	4
Australia	1
Norrköping, Sweden (indoor carpet)
Italy	1
Sweden	4

Final; 28–30 November
Gothenburg, Sweden (indoor carpet)
United States	0
Sweden	5

== First round ==
=== Brazil vs. United States ===
Brazil
1
Tennis Country Club, Ribeirão Preto, Brazil
7–9 February 1997
Clay

United States
4

			1	2	3	4	5
1	(Brazil) (United States)	Gustavo Kuerten; MaliVai Washington	6; 3	6^{6} 7^{8}	6^{3} 7^{7}	3; 6
2	(Brazil) (United States)	Fernando Meligeni; Jim Courier	6; 3	1; 6	4; 6	6; 4	4; 6
3	(Brazil) (United States)	Gustavo Kuerten / Jaime Oncins; Alex O'Brien / Richey Reneberg	6; 2	6; 4	7; 5
4	(Brazil) (United States)	Gustavo Kuerten; Jim Courier	3; 6	2; 6	7; 5	6^{11} 7^{13}
5	(Brazil) (United States)	Fernando Meligeni; Alex O'Brien	5; 7	6^{4} 7^{7}

=== Romania vs. Netherlands ===
Romania
2
Sports Palace, Bucharest, Romania
7–9 February 1997
Hard (indoors)

Netherlands
3

			1	2	3	4	5
1	(Romania) (Netherlands)	Adrian Voinea; Paul Haarhuis	4; 6	6; 1	6; 3	6; 3
2	(Romania) (Netherlands)	Andrei Pavel; Jan Siemerink	6; 2	6; 1	4; 6	6; 4
3	(Romania) (Netherlands)	Ionuț Moldovan / Răzvan Sabău; Jacco Eltingh / Paul Haarhuis	6^{4} 7^{7}	4; 6	3; 6
4	(Romania) (Netherlands)	Adrian Voinea; Jan Siemerink	6^{6} 7^{8}	7; 5	7^{7} 6^{3}	6^{8} 7^{10}	4; 6
5	(Romania) (Netherlands)	Andrei Pavel; Paul Haarhuis	3; 6	1; 6	2; 6

=== Australia vs. France ===
Australia
4
White City Stadium, Sydney, Australia
7–9 February 1997
Grass

France
1

			1	2	3	4	5
1	(Australia) (France)	Pat Rafter; Cédric Pioline	3; 6	6^{5} 7^{7}	6; 4	7; 5	6; 4
2	(Australia) (France)	Mark Woodforde; Arnaud Boetsch	6; 4	6; 4	6; 3
3	(Australia) (France)	Todd Woodbridge / Mark Woodforde; Guy Forget / Guillaume Raoux	7^{8} 6^{6}	6; 4	6; 3
4	(Australia) (France)	Sandon Stolle; Cédric Pioline	7^{7} 6^{3}	6; 4
5	(Australia) (France)	Pat Rafter; Arnaud Boetsch	6; 4	4; 6	6^{5} 7^{7}

=== Czech Republic vs. India ===
Czech Republic
3
Zimní stadion, Příbram, Czech Republic
7–9 February 1997
Clay (indoors)

India
2

			1	2	3	4	5
1	(Czech Republic) (India)	Petr Korda; Mahesh Bhupathi	6; 3	6^{2} 7^{7}	6; 1	6; 2
2	(Czech Republic) (India)	Jiří Novák; Leander Paes	2; 6	3; 6	7^{7} 6^{5}	3; 6
3	(Czech Republic) (India)	Martin Damm / Petr Korda; Mahesh Bhupathi / Leander Paes	6^{7} 7^{9}	3; 6	4; 6
4	(Czech Republic) (India)	Petr Korda; Leander Paes	5; 7	6; 3	6; 4	6; 1
5	(Czech Republic) (India)	Jiří Novák; Mahesh Bhupathi	6; 1	6; 4	6; 3

=== Italy vs. Mexico ===
Italy
4
Foro Italico, Rome, Italy
7–9 February 1997
Clay

Mexico
1

			1	2	3	4	5
1	(Italy) (Mexico)	Omar Camporese; Alejandro Hernández	2; 6	6; 0	6; 4	7; 5
2	(Italy) (Mexico)	Renzo Furlan; Luis Herrera	3; 6	6; 1	6; 2	6; 1
3	(Italy) (Mexico)	Diego Nargiso / Stefano Pescosolido; Alejandro Hernández / Leonardo Lavalle	6; 1	4; 6	7^{9} 6^{7}	6; 3
4	(Italy) (Mexico)	Renzo Furlan; Alejandro Hernández	6; 2	6; 3
5	(Italy) (Mexico)	Omar Camporese; Luis Herrera	6; 2	3; 6	4; 6

=== Spain vs. Germany ===
Spain
4
Hotel L'llot, S'illot, Mallorca, Spain
7–9 February 1997
Clay

Germany
1

			1	2	3	4	5
1	(Spain) (Germany)	Carlos Moyá; Marc-Kevin Goellner	6; 4	6; 3	6; 3
2	(Spain) (Germany)	Albert Costa; Hendrik Dreekmann	6; 4	6; 1	6; 4
3	(Spain) (Germany)	Àlex Corretja / Carlos Costa; Marc-Kevin Goellner / David Prinosil	2; 6	2; 6	3; 6
4	(Spain) (Germany)	Carlos Moyá; Hendrik Dreekmann	6; 4	6; 4	7; 5
5	(Spain) (Germany)	Albert Costa; Marc-Kevin Goellner	2; 6	7^{7} 6^{5}	6; 1

=== South Africa vs. Russia ===
South Africa
3
Westridge Park, Durban, South Africa
7–9 February 1997
Hard

Russia
1

			1	2	3	4	5
1	(South Africa) (Russia)	Marcos Ondruska; Andrei Chesnokov	7^{7} 6^{2}	6; 3	3; 6	4; 6	7; 5
2	(South Africa) (Russia)	Wayne Ferreira; Andrei Cherkasov	7; 5	6; 3	3; 6	4; 6	8; 6
3	(South Africa) (Russia)	Ellis Ferreira / Grant Stafford; Andrei Cherkasov / Andrei Olhovskiy	6; 2	3; 6	6; 0	6; 2
4	(South Africa) (Russia)	Wayne Ferreira; Andrei Chesnokov	2; 6	7^{9} 6^{7}	2; 6
5	(South Africa) (Russia)	Marcos Ondruska; Andrei Cherkasov						not played

=== Sweden vs. Switzerland ===
Sweden
4
Pontushallen, Luleå, Sweden
7–9 February 1997
Hard (indoors)

Switzerland
1

			1	2	3	4	5
1	(Sweden) (Switzerland)	Magnus Larsson; Marc Rosset	6^{3} 7^{7}	6; 3	4; 6	6; 4	11; 13
2	(Sweden) (Switzerland)	Thomas Enqvist; Lorenzo Manta	7^{7} 6^{4}	7^{11} 6^{9}	6; 2
3	(Sweden) (Switzerland)	Nicklas Kulti / Mikael Tillström; Lorenzo Manta / Marc Rosset	5; 7	6; 4	6; 3	5; 7	6; 4
4	(Sweden) (Switzerland)	Thomas Enqvist; Marc Rosset	6; 3	6; 2	3; 6	6; 2
5	(Sweden) (Switzerland)	Magnus Larsson; Ivo Heuberger	3; 6	6; 4	6; 2

== Quarterfinals ==
=== United States vs. Netherlands ===
United States
4
Palisades Tennis Club, Newport Beach, CA, United States
4–6 April 1997
Hard

Netherlands
1

			1	2	3	4	5
1	(United States) (Netherlands)	Andre Agassi; Sjeng Schalken	7^{8} 6^{6}	6; 4	7^{7} 6^{2}
2	(United States) (Netherlands)	Jim Courier; Jan Siemerink	4; 6	4; 6	6; 1	7^{7} 6^{4}	6; 3
3	(United States) (Netherlands)	Rick Leach / Jonathan Stark; Jacco Eltingh / Paul Haarhuis	4; 6	4; 6	6; 3	3; 6
4	(United States) (Netherlands)	Andre Agassi; Jan Siemerink	3; 6	3; 6	6; 3	6; 3	6; 3
5	(United States) (Netherlands)	Jonathan Stark; Sjeng Schalken	6; 4	6; 0

=== Australia vs. Czech Republic ===
Australia
5
Memorial Drive Park, Adelaide, Australia
4–6 April 1997
Grass

Czech Republic
0

			1	2	3	4	5
1	(Australia) (Czech Republic)	Pat Rafter; Martin Damm	6; 1	7^{9} 6^{7}	4; 6	6; 4
2	(Australia) (Czech Republic)	Mark Philippoussis; David Rikl	6; 1	6; 4	2; 6	6; 4
3	(Australia) (Czech Republic)	Todd Woodbridge / Mark Woodforde; Martin Damm / David Rikl	4; 6	6; 1	7; 5	6; 4
4	(Australia) (Czech Republic)	Mark Philippoussis; Martin Damm	6; 4	6; 2
5	(Australia) (Czech Republic)	Pat Rafter; David Rikl	7^{15} 6^{13}	0; 6	6; 2

=== Italy vs. Spain ===
Italy
4
Palazzo dello Sport, Pesaro, Italy
4–6 April 1997
Carpet (indoors)

Spain
1

			1	2	3	4	5
1	(Italy) (Spain)	Omar Camporese; Carlos Moyá	6^{8} 7^{10}	6^{4} 7^{7}	6; 1	6; 3	6; 3
2	(Italy) (Spain)	Renzo Furlan; Albert Costa	4; 6	6; 3	4; 6	6; 4	6; 1
3	(Italy) (Spain)	Omar Camporese / Diego Nargiso; Francisco Roig / Javier Sánchez	5; 7	7^{7} 6^{0}	6; 2	7^{7} 6^{5}
4	(Italy) (Spain)	Marzio Martelli; Carlos Moyá	6^{5} 7^{7}	6; 4	3; 6
5	(Italy) (Spain)	Omar Camporese; Albert Costa	6; 2	3; 6	6; 4

=== Sweden vs. South Africa ===
Sweden
3
Tipshallen, Växjö, Sweden
4–6 April 1997
Carpet (indoors)

South Africa
2

			1	2	3	4	5
1	(Sweden) (South Africa)	Thomas Enqvist; Grant Stafford	7; 5	2; 6	6; 4	6; 1
2	(Sweden) (South Africa)	Jonas Björkman; Wayne Ferreira	3; 6	4; 6	6; 2	6^{3} 7^{7}
3	(Sweden) (South Africa)	Jonas Björkman / Nicklas Kulti; David Adams / Ellis Ferreira	7; 5	2; 6	6; 4	6^{6} 7^{8}	6; 2
4	(Sweden) (South Africa)	Thomas Enqvist; Wayne Ferreira	4; 6	4; 6	4; 6
5	(Sweden) (South Africa)	Jonas Björkman; Grant Stafford	3; 6	6; 0	3; 6	6; 2	6; 2

== Semifinals ==
=== United States vs. Australia ===
United States
4
William H.G. FitzGerald Tennis Center, Washington, DC, United States
19–21 September 1997
Hard

Australia
1

			1	2	3	4	5
1	(United States) (Australia)	Michael Chang; Pat Rafter	6; 4	1; 6	6; 3	6; 4
2	(United States) (Australia)	Pete Sampras; Mark Philippoussis	6; 1	6; 2	7^{7} 6^{5}
3	(United States) (Australia)	Todd Martin / Pete Sampras; Todd Woodbridge / Mark Woodforde	6; 3	6^{5} 7^{7}	2; 6	4; 6
4	(United States) (Australia)	Pete Sampras; Pat Rafter	6^{6} 7^{8}	6; 1	6; 1	6; 4
5	(United States) (Australia)	Michael Chang; Mark Philippoussis	7^{7} 6^{5}	7^{7} 6^{2}

=== Sweden vs. Italy ===
Sweden
4
Himmelstalundshallen, Norrköping, Sweden
19–21 September 1997
Carpet (indoors)

Italy
1

			1	2	3	4	5
1	(Sweden) (Italy)	Jonas Björkman; Omar Camporese	6^{5} 7^{7}	6; 3	6; 2	3; 6	6; 3
2	(Sweden) (Italy)	Thomas Enqvist; Renzo Furlan	6; 3	3; 6	4; 6	6; 3	3; 6
3	(Sweden) (Italy)	Jonas Björkman / Nicklas Kulti; Omar Camporese / Diego Nargiso	6; 1	6; 1	6; 2
4	(Sweden) (Italy)	Jonas Björkman; Renzo Furlan	4; 6	6; 4	6; 0	6; 4
5	(Sweden) (Italy)	Thomas Enqvist; Omar Camporese	6; 3	6^{5} 7^{7}	6; 3

== Final ==
=== Sweden vs. United States ===
Sweden
5
Scandinavium, Gothenburg, Sweden
28–30 November 1997
Carpet (indoors)

United States
0

			1	2	3	4	5
1	(Sweden) (United States)	Jonas Björkman; Michael Chang	7; 5	1; 6	6; 3	6; 3
2	(Sweden) (United States)	Magnus Larsson; Pete Sampras	3; 6	7^{7} 6^{1}	2; 1			retired
3	(Sweden) (United States)	Jonas Björkman / Nicklas Kulti; Todd Martin / Jonathan Stark	6; 4	6; 4	6; 4
4	(Sweden) (United States)	Jonas Björkman; Jonathan Stark	6; 1	6; 1
5	(Sweden) (United States)	Magnus Larsson; Michael Chang	7^{7} 6^{4}	6^{6} 7^{8}	6; 4
