= Daniele Musa =

Italian tennis player

- Country (sports): Italy
- Born: September 10, 1972 (age 52); Rome, Italy
- Height: 1.83 m (6 ft 0 in)
- Turned pro: 1992
- Plays: Right-handed
- Prize money: $183,355

Singles
- Career record: 3–10
- Career titles: 0
- Highest ranking: No. 133 (19 June 1995)

Grand Slam singles results
- US Open: 1R (1994)

Doubles
- Highest ranking: No. 338 (18 May 1998)

Daniele Musa (born 10 September 1972) is a former professional tennis player from Italy.

== Career ==
Musa, who was runner-up in the 1990 Italian 18s Championships, made it through qualifying at the 1994 US Open. He lost in the opening round to 13th seed Thomas Muster.

He won the Recife Challenger tournament in 1994.

The Italian reached the second round of two ATP Tour tournaments in 1995, at Kitzbuhel and the New Haven Open.

== Challenger titles ==
=== Singles: (1) ===
No.	Year	Tournament	Surface	Opponent	Score
1.	1994	Recife, Brazil	Hard	(United States) Doug Flach	6–1, 6–4

=== Doubles: (1) ===
No.	Year	Tournament	Surface	Partner	Opponents	Score
1.	1997	Montauban, France	Clay	(Italy) Gabrio Castrichella	(Germany) Lars Rehmann (Hungary) Attila Sávolt	5–7, 6–2, 6–3
