= Gabrio Castrichella =

Italian tennis coach and former tennis player

- Country (sports): Italy
- Born: October 24, 1972 (age 52)

Singles
- Career record: 0–0
- Highest ranking: No. 207 (28 April 1997)

Doubles
- Career record: 1–2
- Highest ranking: No. 274 (27 October 1997)
Medal record
Mediterranean Games
| Gold medal – first place | 1997 Bari | Doubles |
- Last updated on: April 14, 2019.

Gabrio Castrichella (born October 24, 1972) is an Italian tennis coach and retired professional tennis player who won a gold medal at the 1997 Mediterranean Games.

== ATP Challenger Tour finals ==
=== Doubles: 1 (1 title) ===
| Result | Date | Tournament | Surface | Partner | Opponents | Score |
|---|---|---|---|---|---|---|
| Win | Jul 1997 | Montauban Challenger, France | Clay | (Italy) Daniele Musa | (Germany) Lars Rehmann (Hungary) Attila Sávolt | 5–7, 6–2, 6–3 |
