= 1990 Dutch Open – Doubles =

Doubles
- 1990 Dutch Open

Final
- Champions: (Spain) Sergio Casal (Spain) Emilio Sánchez
- Runners-up: (Netherlands) Paul Haarhuis (Netherlands) Mark Koevermans
- Score: 7–5, 7–5

Details
- Draw: 16
- Seeds: 4

Events
Singles	Doubles
← 1989 ·	Dutch Open	· 1991 →

There was no defending champions for this year, as the previous final between Tomás Carbonell and Diego Pérez against Paul Haarhuis and Mark Koevermans was cancelled due to rain.

Pérez did not compete this year. Carbonell teamed up with Carlos Costa and lost in first round to tournament winners Sergio Casal and Emilio Sánchez.

Haarhuis and Koevermans reached the final again, but lost to Casal and Sánchez 7–5, 7–5.

== Seeds ==
1. (Spain) Sergio Casal / (Spain) Emilio Sánchez (champions)
2. (Italy) Omar Camporese / (Spain) Javier Sánchez (semifinals)
3. (Czechoslovakia) Karel Nováček / (Czechoslovakia) Tomáš Šmíd (semifinals)
4. (Netherlands) Paul Haarhuis / (Netherlands) Mark Koevermans (final)

== Draw ==
=== Key ===
- Q = Qualifier
- WC = Wild card
- LL = Lucky loser
- Alt = Alternate
- ITF = ITF entry
- PR = Protected ranking
- SR = Special ranking
- SE = Special exempt
- JE = Junior exempt
- JR = Junior Accelerator Programme entrant
- CO = College Accelerator Programme entrant
- NG = Next Gen Accelerator Program entrant
- w/o = Walkover
- r = Retired
- d = Defaulted

=== Draw ===
First round
1	(Spain) S Casal (Spain) E Sánchez	6	2	6
(Spain) C Costa (Spain) T Carbonell	2	6	2
(Uruguay) M Filippini (Argentina) G Pérez Roldán	2	6	4
(Sweden) D Engel (Czechoslovakia) L Pimek	6	3	6
3	(Czechoslovakia) K Nováček (Czechoslovakia) T Šmíd	6	7
(Iran) M Bahrami (Switzerland) M Rosset	0	5
(Spain) F Clavet (Austria) H Skoff	6	6
(Italy) F Mordegan (Spain) F Roig	0	4
(Denmark) M Mortensen (Netherlands) T Nijssen	4	3
(Argentina) M Jaite (Argentina) C Miniussi	6	6
WC	(Netherlands) HJ Davids (Netherlands) T Kempers	4	6	3
4	(Netherlands) P Haarhuis (Netherlands) M Koevermans	6	4	6
(Spain) JC Báguena (Czechoslovakia) C Suk	6	7
(France) O Delaître (Belgium) E Masso	4	5
(Spain) S Bruguera (Argentina) H de la Peña	2	6
2	(Italy) O Camporese (Spain) J Sánchez	6	7

Quarterfinals
1	(Spain) S Casal (Spain) E Sánchez	6	6
(Sweden) D Engel (Czechoslovakia) L Pimek	4	3
3	(Czechoslovakia) K Nováček (Czechoslovakia) T Šmíd	7	6
(Spain) F Clavet (Austria) H Skoff	5	2
(Argentina) M Jaite (Argentina) C Miniussi	2	1
4	(Netherlands) P Haarhuis (Netherlands) M Koevermans	6	6
(Spain) JC Báguena (Czechoslovakia) C Suk	7	1	4
2	(Italy) O Camporese (Spain) J Sánchez	6	6	6

Semifinals
1	(Spain) S Casal (Spain) E Sánchez	7	7
3	(Czechoslovakia) K Nováček (Czechoslovakia) T Šmíd	5	5
4	(Netherlands) P Haarhuis (Netherlands) M Koevermans	6	6	6
2	(Italy) O Camporese (Spain) J Sánchez	1	7	2

Final
1	(Spain) S Casal (Spain) E Sánchez	7	7
4	(Netherlands) P Haarhuis (Netherlands) M Koevermans	5	5
