= 1992 Dutch Open – Doubles =

Doubles
- 1992 Dutch Open

Final
- Champions: (Netherlands) Paul Haarhuis (Netherlands) Mark Koevermans
- Runners-up: (Sweden) Mårten Renström (Sweden) Mikael Tillström
- Score: 6–7, 6–1, 6–4

Events
| Singles | Doubles |
| ← 1991 · | Dutch Open | · 1993 → |

Richard Krajicek and Jan Siemerink were the defending champions, but none competed this year.

Paul Haarhuis and Mark Koevermans won the title by defeating Mårten Renström and Mikael Tillström 6–7, 6–1, 6–4 in the final.

== Seeds ==
1. (Netherlands) Tom Nijssen / (Czechoslovakia) Cyril Suk (semifinals)
2. (Netherlands) Paul Haarhuis / (Netherlands) Mark Koevermans (champions)
3. (Netherlands) Hendrik Jan Davids / (Czechoslovakia) Libor Pimek (first round)
4. (Netherlands) Jacco Eltingh / (Netherlands) Tom Kempers (semifinals)

== Draw ==
=== Key ===
- Q = Qualifier
- WC = Wild card
- LL = Lucky loser
- Alt = Alternate
- ITF = ITF entry
- PR = Protected ranking
- SR = Special ranking
- SE = Special exempt
- JE = Junior exempt
- JR = Junior Accelerator Programme entrant
- CO = College Accelerator Programme entrant
- NG = Next Gen Accelerator Program entrant
- w/o = Walkover
- r = Retired
- d = Defaulted

=== Draw ===
First round
1 | (Netherlands) T Nijssen (Czechoslovakia) C Suk | 4 | 6 | 6
(France) T Benhabiles (France) F Santoro | 6 | 3 | 2
Q | (Netherlands) M van den Berg (Netherlands) J Wijnhoud | 6 | 2 | 6
(France) T Champion (France) C Pioline | 4 | 6 | 7
3 | (Netherlands) HJ Davids (Czechoslovakia) L Pimek | 2 | 4
(Sweden) M Renström (Sweden) M Tillström | 6 | 6
WC | (Russia) A Chesnokov (Sweden) L Jönsson | 3 | 0
(Czechoslovakia) K Nováček (Kenya) P Wekesa | 6 | 6
(Peru) P Arraya (Belgium) E Masso | 1 | 4
(Australia) C Limberger (United States) T Nelson | 6 | 6
(Spain) J Arrese (Spain) G Pérez Roldán | 1 | 3
4 | (Netherlands) J Eltingh (Netherlands) T Kempers | 6 | 6
(Germany) MK Goellner (Netherlands) M Oosting | 6 | 6
(Sweden) N Holm (South Africa) B Haygarth | 1 | 4
(Spain) JA Conde (Netherlands) J Winnink | 6 | 1
2 | (Netherlands) P Haarhuis (Netherlands) M Koevermans | 7 | 6

Quarterfinals
1 | (Netherlands) T Nijssen (Czechoslovakia) C Suk | 6 | 6
(France) T Champion (France) C Pioline | 3 | 4
(Sweden) M Renström (Sweden) M Tillström | 6 | 7
(Czechoslovakia) K Nováček (Kenya) P Wekesa | 3 | 6
(Australia) C Limberger (United States) T Nelson | 7 | 2 | 3
4 | (Netherlands) J Eltingh (Netherlands) T Kempers | 5 | 6 | 6
(Germany) MK Goellner (Netherlands) M Oosting | 1 | 3
2 | (Netherlands) P Haarhuis (Netherlands) M Koevermans | 6 | 6

Semifinals
1 | (Netherlands) T Nijssen (Czechoslovakia) C Suk | 2 | 6 | 3
(Sweden) M Renström (Sweden) M Tillström | 6 | 2 | 6
4 | (Netherlands) J Eltingh (Netherlands) T Kempers | 4 | 6 | 4
2 | (Netherlands) P Haarhuis (Netherlands) M Koevermans | 6 | 2 | 6

Final
(Sweden) M Renström (Sweden) M Tillström | 7 | 1 | 4
2 | (Netherlands) P Haarhuis (Netherlands) M Koevermans | 6 | 6 | 6
