= 1991 Dutch Open – Singles =

Singles
- 1991 Dutch Open

Final
- Champion: (Sweden) Magnus Gustafsson
- Runner-up: (Spain) Jordi Arrese
- Score: 5–7, 7–6^{(7–2)}, 2–6, 6–1, 6–0

Details
- Draw: 32
- Seeds: 8

Events
Singles	Doubles
← 1990 ·	Dutch Open	· 1992 →

Francisco Clavet was the defending champion of the singles event at the Dutch Open men's tennis tournament, but he lost to Magnus Gustafsson.

Gustafsson won in the final 5–7, 7–6^{(7–2)}, 2–6, 6–1, 6–0 against Jordi Arrese.

== Seeds ==
Champion seeds are indicated in bold while text in italics indicates the round in which that seed was eliminated.

1. (Spain) Sergi Bruguera (second round)
2. (Czechoslovakia) Karel Nováček (semifinals)
3. (Soviet Union) Andrei Cherkasov (first round)
4. (Sweden) **Magnus Gustafsson** **(champion)**
5. (Socialist Federal Republic of Yugoslavia) Goran Prpić (second round)
6. (Austria) Horst Skoff (second round)
7. (Argentina) Guillermo Pérez Roldán (first round)
8. (Italy) Omar Camporese (second round)

== Draw ==
=== Key ===
- Q = Qualifier
- WC = Wild card
- LL = Lucky loser
- Alt = Alternate
- ITF = ITF entry
- PR = Protected ranking
- SR = Special ranking
- SE = Special exempt
- JE = Junior exempt
- JR = Junior Accelerator Programme entrant
- CO = College Accelerator Programme entrant
- NG = Next Gen Accelerator Program entrant
- w/o = Walkover
- r = Retired
- d = Defaulted

=== Finals ===
Semifinals
(Netherlands) Mark Koevermans	3	**6**	4
(Spain) **Jordi Arrese**	**6**	3	**6**
4	(Sweden) **Magnus Gustafsson**	**7**	**6**
2	(Czechoslovakia) Karel Nováček	6	3

Final
(Spain) Jordi Arrese	**7**	6^{2}	**6**	1	0
4	(Sweden) **Magnus Gustafsson**	5	**7^{7}**	2	**6**	**6**

=== Section 1 ===
First round
1	(Spain) **S Bruguera**	**6**	**6**
Q	(Uruguay) D Pérez	4	4
(Netherlands) **M Koevermans**	**7**	**6**
(Netherlands) P Haarhuis	4	2
Q	(Italy) **R Furlan**	3	**6**	**6**
(Uruguay) M Filippini	**6**	2	1
8	(Italy) **O Camporese**	**6**	**6**
(Argentina) M Jaite	1	3
6	(Austria) **H Skoff**	**6**	**6**
WC	(Netherlands) J Eltingh	4	3
(Spain) **J Arrese**	**6**	**6**
Q	(France) O Delaître	0	2
(Spain) **T Carbonell**	**6**	**6**
(Haiti) R Agénor	1	3
WC	(Austria) **T Muster**	**6**	**6**
3	(Soviet Union) A Cherkasov	3	3

Second round
1	(Spain) S Bruguera	5	4
(Netherlands) **M Koevermans**	**7**	**6**
Q	(Italy) **R Furlan**	1	**7**	**6**
8	(Italy) O Camporese	**6**	6	2
6	(Austria) H Skoff	**6**	6	2
(Spain) **J Arrese**	3	**7**	**6**
(Spain) T Carbonell	**7**	1	1
WC	(Austria) **T Muster**	6	**6**	**6**

Quarterfinals
(Netherlands) **M Koevermans**	**6**	**6**
(Italy) R Furlan	1	1
(Spain) **J Arrese**	**6**	**6**
WC	(Austria) T Muster	4	1

Semifinals
(Netherlands) M Koevermans	3	**6**	4
(Spain) **J Arrese**	**6**	3	**6**

=== Section 2 ===
First round
4	(Sweden) **M Gustafsson**	**7**	**7**
(Spain) F Clavet	6	6
(Sweden) **L Jonsson**	3	**6**	**6**
(Argentina) H de la Peña	**6**	4	0
(Switzerland) **M Rosset**	**6**	**6**
(Netherlands) R Krajicek	4	4
5	(Socialist Federal Republic of Yugoslavia) **G Prpić**	**6**	**7**
Q	(Germany) K Braasch	3	6
7	(Argentina) G Pérez Roldán	4	**6**	6
WC	(France) **T Champion**	**6**	3	**7**
(Argentina) **F Davín**	**6**	**6**
(Netherlands) J Siemerink	4	3
(France) **C Pioline**	**6**	**6**
Q	(Spain) F Roig	4	2
(Argentina) A Mancini	**7**	3	1
2	(Czechoslovakia) **K Nováček**	5	**6**	**6**

Second round
4	(Sweden) **M Gustafsson**	**7**	**7**
(Sweden) L Jonsson	5	5
(Switzerland) **M Rosset**	**7**	3	**6**
5	(Socialist Federal Republic of Yugoslavia) G Prpić	6	**6**	4
WC	(France) T Champion	**6**	4	4
(Argentina) **F Davín**	3	**6**	**6**
(France) C Pioline	4	4
2	(Czechoslovakia) **K Nováček**	**6**	**6**

Quarterfinals
4	(Sweden) **M Gustafsson**	6	**6**	**6**
(Switzerland) M Rosset	**7**	2	4
(Argentina) F Davín	6	**6**	2
2	(Czechoslovakia) **K Nováček**	**7**	2	**6**

Semifinals
4	(Sweden) **M Gustafsson**	**7**	**6**
2	(Czechoslovakia) K Nováček	6	3
