= 1988 Dutch Open – Singles =

Singles
- 1988 Dutch Open

Final
- Champion: (Spain) Emilio Sánchez
- Runner-up: (Argentina) Guillermo Pérez Roldán
- Score: 6–3, 6–1, 3–6, 6–3

Details
- Draw: 32 (3WC/4Q)
- Seeds: 8

Events
Singles	Doubles
← 1987 ·	Dutch Open	· 1989 →

Miloslav Mečíř was the defending champion, but did not compete this year.

Emilio Sánchez won the title by defeating Guillermo Pérez Roldán 6–3, 6–1, 3–6, 6–3 in the final.

== Seeds ==
1. (Argentina) Guillermo Pérez Roldán (final)
2. (Spain) Emilio Sánchez (champion)
3. (Switzerland) Claudio Mezzadri (quarterfinals)
4. (Sweden) Magnus Gustafsson (semifinals)
5. (Australia) Mark Woodforde (semifinals)
6. (Argentina) Alberto Mancini (quarterfinals)
7. (West Germany) Tore Meinecke (first round)
8. (Argentina) Eduardo Bengoechea (quarterfinals)

== Draw ==
=== Key ===
- Q = Qualifier
- WC = Wild card
- LL = Lucky loser
- Alt = Alternate
- SE = Special exempt
- PR = Protected ranking
- ITF = ITF entry
- JE = Junior exempt
- w/o = Walkover
- r = Retired
- d = Defaulted
- SR = Special ranking

=== Finals ===
Semifinals
1	(Argentina) Guillermo Pérez Roldán	7	2	6
4	(Sweden) Magnus Gustafsson	6	6	3
5	(Australia) Mark Woodforde	4	3
2	(Spain) Emilio Sánchez	6	6

Final
1	(Argentina) Guillermo Pérez Roldán	3	1	6	3
2	(Spain) Emilio Sánchez	6	6	3	6

=== Top half ===
First round
1	(Argentina) G Pérez Roldán	6	6
(Czechoslovakia) L Pimek	2	1
(West Germany) P Vojtíšek	6	6
(Czechoslovakia) B Stankovič	2	2
(Chile) P Rebolledo	6	6
Q	(Netherlands) P Haarhuis	2	2
(Sweden) N Kroon	6	6
7	(West Germany) T Meinecke	2	4
4	(Sweden) M Gustafsson	6	6
(Spain) S Casal	4	4
Q	(West Germany) G Marzenell	7	6
(Czechoslovakia) P Korda	5	3
(Argentina) F Yunis	6	6
(West Germany) H Schwaier	4	4
(Sweden) U Stenlund	4	1
6	(Argentina) A Mancini	6	6

Second round
1	(Argentina) G Pérez Roldán	6	6
(West Germany) P Vojtíšek	3	4
(Chile) P Rebolledo	6	6
(Sweden) N Kroon	0	4
4	(Sweden) M Gustafsson	6	6
Q	(West Germany) G Marzenell	4	1
(Argentina) F Yunis	4	2
6	(Argentina) A Mancini	6	6

Quarterfinals
1	(Argentina) G Pérez Roldán	7	7
(Chile) P Rebolledo	5	6
4	(Sweden) M Gustafsson	2	7	6
6	(Argentina) A Mancini	6	5	0

Semifinals
1	(Argentina) G Pérez Roldán	7	2	6
4	(Sweden) M Gustafsson	6	6	3

=== Bottom half ===
First round
5	(Australia) M Woodforde	4	6	6
Q	(Socialist Federal Republic of Yugoslavia) M Ostoja	6	3	4
(Sweden) J Gunnarsson	7	6
WC	(Australia) C Limberger	5	3
Q	(Netherlands) JW Lodder	4	6	7
(West Germany) D Keretić	6	3	5
(Israel) G Bloom	4	1
3	(Switzerland) C Mezzadri	6	6
8	(Argentina) E Bengoechea	6	6
(Netherlands) M Oosting	1	3
(West Germany) U Riglewski	2	7	3
(Netherlands) T Nijssen	6	5	6
WC	(Netherlands) P Dogger	6	6	6
WC	(Netherlands) H van Boeckel	7	3	2
(Japan) S Matsuoka	3	2
2	(Spain) E Sánchez	6	6

Second round
5	(Australia) M Woodforde	6	6
(Sweden) J Gunnarsson	1	3
Q	(Netherlands) JW Lodder	2	4
3	(Switzerland) C Mezzadri	6	6
8	(Argentina) E Bengoechea	6	6
(Netherlands) T Nijssen	2	2
WC	(Netherlands) P Dogger	3	2
2	(Spain) E Sánchez	6	6

Quarterfinals
5	(Australia) M Woodforde	7	6
3	(Switzerland) C Mezzadri	5	2
8	(Argentina) E Bengoechea	1	6
2	(Spain) E Sánchez	6	7

Semifinals
5	(Australia) M Woodforde	4	3
2	(Spain) E Sánchez	6	6
