= 1991 Dutch Open – Doubles =

Doubles
- 1991 Dutch Open

Final
- Champions: (Netherlands) Richard Krajicek (Netherlands) Jan Siemerink
- Runners-up: (Spain) Francisco Clavet (Sweden) Magnus Gustafsson
- Score: 7–5, 6–4

Details
- Draw: 16
- Seeds: 4

Events
Singles	Doubles
← 1990 ·	Dutch Open	· 1992 →

Sergio Casal and Emilio Sánchez were the defending champions, but none competed this year. Sánchez opted to rest after winning at Stuttgart in the previous week, alongside Wally Masur.

Richard Krajicek and Jan Siemerink won the title by defeating Francisco Clavet and Magnus Gustafsson 7–5, 6–4 in the final.

== Seeds ==
1. (Netherlands) Tom Nijssen / (Czechoslovakia) Cyril Suk (semifinals)
2. (Sweden) Ronnie Båthman / (Sweden) Rikard Bergh (semifinals)
3. (Czechoslovakia) Vojtěch Flégl / (Socialist Federal Republic of Yugoslavia) Goran Prpić (quarterfinals)
4. (Netherlands) Hendrik Jan Davids / (Sweden) Per Henricsson (first round)

== Draw ==
=== Key ===
- Q = Qualifier
- WC = Wild card
- LL = Lucky loser
- Alt = Alternate
- SE = Special exempt
- PR = Protected ranking
- ITF = ITF entry
- JE = Junior exempt
- w/o = Walkover
- r = Retired
- d = Defaulted
- SR = Special ranking

=== Draw ===
First round
1	(Netherlands) T Nijssen (Czechoslovakia) C Suk	6	3	6
(Netherlands) J Eltingh (Netherlands) M Schapers	1	6	2
(South Africa) D Adams (Spain) E Roig	5	2
(Argentina) C Miniussi (Brazil) C Motta	7	6
3	(Czechoslovakia) V Flégl (Socialist Federal Republic of Yugoslavia) G Prpić	7	7
Q	(France) O Delaître (Soviet Union) D Poliakov	5	5
WC	(Argentina) G Pérez Roldán (Switzerland) M Rosset	2	3
(Netherlands) R Krajicek (Netherlands) J Siemerink	6	6
(Sweden) N Holm (Sweden) O Jonsson	2	4
(Spain) C Costa (Argentina) H de la Peña	6	6
(Spain) F Clavet (Sweden) M Gustafsson	6	6
4	(Netherlands) HJ Davids (Sweden) P Henricsson	3	0
(Netherlands) P Haarhuis (Netherlands) T Kempers	6	5	5
(Czechoslovakia) K Nováček (Netherlands) M Oosting	3	7	7
(Iran) M Bahrami (Uruguay) D Pérez	3	1
2	(Sweden) R Båthman (Sweden) R Bergh	6	6

Quarterfinals
1	(Netherlands) T Nijssen (Czechoslovakia) C Suk	6	6	7
(Argentina) C Miniussi (Brazil) C Motta	1	7	5
3	(Czechoslovakia) V Flégl (Socialist Federal Republic of Yugoslavia) G Prpić	6	4	4
(Netherlands) R Krajicek (Netherlands) J Siemerink	4	6	6
(Spain) C Costa (Argentina) H de la Peña	3	2
(Spain) F Clavet (Sweden) M Gustafsson	6	6
(Czechoslovakia) K Nováček (Netherlands) M Oosting	4	3
2	(Sweden) R Båthman (Sweden) R Bergh	6	6

Semifinals
1	(Netherlands) T Nijssen (Czechoslovakia) C Suk	1	1
(Netherlands) R Krajicek (Netherlands) J Siemerink	6	6
(Spain) F Clavet (Sweden) M Gustafsson	2	7	6
2	(Sweden) R Båthman (Sweden) R Bergh	6	6	4

Final
(Netherlands) R Krajicek (Netherlands) J Siemerink	7	6
(Spain) F Clavet (Sweden) M Gustafsson	5	4
