= 1989 Dutch Open – Doubles =

Doubles
- 1989 Dutch Open

Final
- Champions: No champions declared
- Runners-up: (Spain) Tomás Carbonell (Uruguay) Diego Pérez, and (Netherlands) Paul Haarhuis (Netherlands) Mark Koevermans
- Score: Final cancelled due to rain

Events
Singles	Doubles
← 1988 ·	Dutch Open	· 1990 →

Sergio Casal and Emilio Sánchez were the defending champions, but Casal did not compete this year due to a wrist injury. Sánchez teamed up with Javier Sánchez and lost in the semifinals to Paul Haarhuis and Mark Koevermans.

The tournament was finished with no champions, as the final between Tomás Carbonell and Diego Pérez against Paul Haarhuis and Mark Koevermans was cancelled due to rain.

== Seeds ==
1. (Spain) Emilio Sánchez / (Spain) Javier Sánchez (semifinals)
2. (Spain) Tomás Carbonell / (Uruguay) Diego Pérez (final, match cancelled)
3. (Netherlands) Menno Oosting / (Netherlands) Johan Vekemans (quarterfinals)
4. (Czechoslovakia) Josef Čihák / (Czechoslovakia) Karel Nováček (quarterfinals)

== Draw ==
=== Key ===
- Q = Qualifier
- WC = Wild card
- LL = Lucky loser
- Alt = Alternate
- ITF = ITF entry
- PR = Protected ranking
- SR = Special ranking
- SE = Special exempt
- JE = Junior exempt
- JR = Junior Accelerator Programme entrant
- CO = College Accelerator Programme entrant
- NG = Next Gen Accelerator Program entrant
- w/o = Walkover
- r = Retired
- d = Defaulted

=== Draw ===
First round
1	(Spain) E Sánchez (Spain) J Sánchez	7	6
(France) T Champion (France) F Errard	5	2
(Netherlands) HJ Davids (Netherlands) J Eltingh	3	3
(Argentina) R Azar (Spain) J Clavet	6	6
3	(Netherlands) M Oosting (Netherlands) J Vekemans	4	6	6
(Czechoslovakia) J Bulant (Italy) C Pistolesi	6	4	2
(Netherlands) P Haarhuis (Netherlands) M Koevermans	7	4	6
WC	(Australia) B Larkham (Australia) C Limberger	5	6	3
(Sweden) N Kroon (Sweden) T Nydahl	6	5
(Spain) F Clavet (Argentina) G Giussani	7	7
(Italy) P Canè (Argentina) F Davín	4	1
4	(Czechoslovakia) J Čihák (Czechoslovakia) K Nováček	6	6
(Finland) J Berner (Japan) E Furusho	6	1	3
(Austria) H Skoff (Soviet Union) A Võsand	4	6	6
(Netherlands) R Kok (Sweden) P Nyborg	4	3
2	(Spain) T Carbonell (Uruguay) D Pérez	6	6

Quarterfinals
1	(Spain) E Sánchez (Spain) J Sánchez	7	6
(Argentina) R Azar (Spain) J Clavet	5	3
3	(Netherlands) M Oosting (Netherlands) J Vekemans	6	6
(Netherlands) P Haarhuis (Netherlands) M Koevermans	7	7
(Spain) F Clavet (Argentina) G Giussani	6	6
4	(Czechoslovakia) J Čihák (Czechoslovakia) K Nováček	2	3
(Austria) H Skoff (Soviet Union) A Võsand	1	1
2	(Spain) T Carbonell (Uruguay) D Pérez	6	6

Semifinals
1	(Spain) E Sánchez (Spain) J Sánchez	6	6	1
(Netherlands) P Haarhuis (Netherlands) M Koevermans	7	4	6
(Spain) F Clavet (Argentina) G Giussani	0	15	r
2	(Spain) T Carbonell (Uruguay) D Pérez	0	40

Final
(Netherlands) P Haarhuis (Netherlands) M Koevermans
2	(Spain) T Carbonell (Uruguay) D Pérez	s
