= 1989 Dutch Open – Singles =

Singles
- 1989 Dutch Open

Final
- Champion: (Czechoslovakia) Karel Nováček
- Runner-up: (Spain) Emilio Sánchez
- Score: 6–2, 6–4

Details
- Draw: 32 (2WC / 4Q)
- Seeds: 8

Events
Singles	Doubles
← 1988 ·	Dutch Open	· 1990 →

Emilio Sánchez was the defending champion, but finished runner-up this year.

Karel Nováček won the tournament, beating Sánchez in the final, 6–2, 6–4.

== Seeds ==
1. (Sweden) Kent Carlsson (first round)
2. (Spain) Emilio Sánchez (final)
3. (Soviet Union) Andrei Chesnokov (quarterfinals)
4. (Austria) Horst Skoff (quarterfinals)
5. (Italy) Paolo Canè (semifinals)
6. N/A
7. (Spain) Javier Sánchez (second round)
8. (Czechoslovakia) Karel Nováček (champion)

== Draw ==
=== Key ===
- Q = Qualifier
- WC = Wild card
- LL = Lucky loser
- Alt = Alternate
- ITF = ITF entry
- PR = Protected ranking
- SR = Special ranking
- SE = Special exempt
- JE = Junior exempt
- JR = Junior Accelerator Programme entrant
- CO = College Accelerator Programme entrant
- NG = Next Gen Accelerator Program entrant
- w/o = Walkover
- r = Retired
- d = Defaulted

=== Finals ===
Semifinals
8	(Czechoslovakia) Karel Nováček	6	7
(Spain) Tomás Carbonell	3	6
5	(Italy) Paolo Canè	2	2
2	(Spain) Emilio Sánchez	6	6

Final
8	(Czechoslovakia) Karel Nováček	6	6
2	(Spain) Emilio Sánchez	2	4

=== Top half ===
First round
1	(Sweden) K Carlsson	3	5
(Netherlands) P Haarhuis	6	7
Q	(Argentina) R Azar	1	6	6
(Sweden) N Kroon	6	3	2
(Spain) S Casal	6	6
(Austria) S Lochbihler	2	2
(Czechoslovakia) J Čihák	6	3	6
8	(Czechoslovakia) K Nováček	2	6	7
4	(Austria) H Skoff	6	6
(West Germany) U Riglewski	4	4
(Sweden) T Nydahl	6	6	7
Q	(Spain) F Clavet	1	7	6
WC	(Netherlands) HJ Davids	1	4
(Italy) C Pistolesi	6	6
(Spain) Tomás Carbonell (tennis)T Carbonell	6	6
LL	(Netherlands) R Kok	1	2

Second round
(Netherlands) P Haarhuis	7	6
Q	(Argentina) R Azar	6	2
(Spain) S Casal	3	6	3
8	(Czechoslovakia) K Nováček	6	3	6
4	(Austria) H Skoff	6	7
(Sweden) T Nydahl	2	6
(Italy) C Pistolesi	6	5	2
(Spain) T Carbonell	4	7	6

Quarterfinals
(Netherlands) P Haarhuis	2	3
8	(Czechoslovakia) K Nováček	6	6
4	(Austria) H Skoff	5	3
(Spain) T Carbonell	7	6

Semifinals
8	(Czechoslovakia) K Nováček	6	7
(Spain) T Carbonell	3	6

=== Bottom half ===
First round
5	(Italy) P Canè	6	6	6
LL	(Sweden) P Nyborg	4	7	1
(Czechoslovakia) J Bulant	6	2
Q	(West Germany) C Geyer	7	6
(Uruguay) D Pérez	6	6
(Australia) C Limberger	1	0
(France) T Champion	3	1
3	(Soviet Union) A Chesnokov	6	6
7	(Spain) J Sánchez	6	7
WC	(Netherlands) P Dogger	3	6
Q	(Netherlands) J Eltingh	5	1
(Argentina) F Davín	7	6
(Soviet Union) A Võsand	1	3
(Argentina) G Giussani	6	6
(Netherlands) T Nijssen	6	5
2	(Spain) E Sánchez	7	7

Second round
5	(Italy) P Canè	6	6
Q	(West Germany) C Geyer	4	2
(Uruguay) D Pérez	2	2
3	(Soviet Union) A Chesnokov	6	6
7	(Spain) J Sánchez	6	6	6
(Argentina) F Davín	7	3	7
(Argentina) G Giussani	6	2	2
2	(Spain) E Sánchez	1	6	6

Quarterfinals
5	(Italy) P Canè	7	1	6
3	(Soviet Union) A Chesnokov	5	6	4
(Argentina) F Davín	7	1	3
2	(Spain) E Sánchez	6	6	6

Semifinals
5	(Italy) P Canè	2	2
2	(Spain) E Sánchez	6	6
