= 1970 Dutch Open (tennis) =

- Date: 3–9 August
- Edition: 13th
- Draw: 64S / 32D
- Prize money: $10,000
- Surface: Clay / outdoor
- Location: Hilversum, Netherlands
- Venue: 't Melkhuisje

Champions

Men's singles
- (Netherlands) Tom Okker

Women's singles
- (Australia) Margaret Court

Men's doubles
- (Australia) Bill Bowrey / (Australia) Owen Davidson

Women's doubles
- (Australia) Karen Krantzcke / (Australia) Kerry Melville

Mixed doubles
- (United Kingdom) Winnie Shaw / (Australia) Owen Davidson
| ← 1969 · | Dutch Open | · 1971 → |

The 1970 Dutch Open was a combined men's and women's tennis tournament staged in Hilversum, Netherlands. The tournament was played on outdoor clay courts and was held from 3 August until 9 August 1970. It was the 13th edition of the tournament. Tom Okker won the men's singles title and earned $3,000 first-prize money while Margaret Court won the women's singles event.

== Finals ==
=== Men's singles ===
(Netherlands) Tom Okker defeated (United Kingdom) Roger Taylor 4–6, 6–0, 6–1, 6–3

=== Women's singles ===
(Australia) Margaret Court defeated (Australia) Kerry Melville 6–1, 6–1

=== Men's doubles ===
(Australia) Bill Bowrey / (Australia) Owen Davidson defeated (Australia) John Alexander / (Australia) Phil Dent 6–3, 6–4, 6–2

=== Women's doubles ===
(Australia) Karen Krantzcke / (Australia) Kerry Melville defeated (Australia) Margaret Court / (West Germany) Helga Niessen 3–6, 9–7, 7–5

=== Mixed doubles ===
(United Kingdom) Winnie Shaw / (Australia) Owen Davidson defeated (Sweden) Christina Sandberg / (South Africa) Bob Maud 4–6, 6–3, 7–5
