= 1992 Dutch Open – Singles =

Singles
- 1992 Dutch Open

Final
- Champion: (Czechoslovakia) Karel Nováček
- Runner-up: (Spain) Jordi Arrese
- Score: 6–2, 6–3, 2–6, 7–5

Details
- Draw: 32
- Seeds: 8

Events
| Singles | Doubles |
| ← 1991 · | Dutch Open | · 1993 → |

Magnus Gustafsson was the defending champion, but the sixth seeded Swede lost in the second round to Jacco Eltingh. Karel Nováček won the singles event at the 1992 Dutch Open defeating Jordi Arrese in the final 6–2, 6–3, 2–6, 7–5 and captured his second title in Hilversum.

== Seeds ==
Champion seeds are indicated in bold while text in italics indicates the round in which that seed was eliminated.

1. (Spain) Carlos Costa (first round)
2. (Spain) Jordi Arrese (final)
3. (Czechoslovakia) **Karel Nováček (champion)**
4. (Commonwealth of Independent States) Andrei Cherkasov (second round)
5. (Netherlands) Paul Haarhuis (first round)
6. (Sweden) Magnus Gustafsson (second round)
7. (France) Fabrice Santoro (semifinals)
8. (Argentina) Guillermo Pérez Roldán (second round)

== Draw ==
=== Key ===
- Q = Qualifier
- WC = Wild card
- LL = Lucky loser
- Alt = Alternate
- SE = Special exempt
- PR = Protected ranking
- ITF = ITF entry
- JE = Junior exempt
- w/o = Walkover
- r = Retired
- d = Defaulted
- SR = Special ranking

=== Finals ===
Semifinals
7 | (France) Fabrice Santoro | 3 | 3
3 | (Czechoslovakia) **Karel Nováček** | **6** | **6**
WC | (Sweden) Mikael Tillström | 3 | 3
2 | (Spain) **Jordi Arrese** | **6** | **6**

Final
2 | (Czechoslovakia) **Karel Nováček** | **6** | **6** | 2 | **7**
3 | (Spain) Jordi Arrese | 2 | 3 | **6** | 5

=== Section 1 ===
First round
1 | (Spain) Carlos Costa | 3 | 3
**(France) C Pioline** | **6** | **6**
**(Netherlands) J Siemerink** | **7** | **6**
Q | (France) T Benhabiles | 5 | 3
(Peru) P Arraya | 5 | 4
WC | **(Netherlands) T Nijssen** | **7** | **6**
(France) R Gilbert | 3 | 3
7 | **(France) F Santoro** | **6** | **6**
3 | **(Czech Republic) K Nováček** | **6** | **6**
(Belgium) E Masso | 4 | 4
**(Italy) R Furlan** | **6** | 4 | **6**
Q | (Spain) JA Conde | 1 | **6** | 3
(Australia) C Limberger | **6** | 3 | 1
**(Netherlands) J Eltingh** | 3 | **6** | **6**
(Sweden) J Svensson | 3 | 3
6 | **(Sweden) M Gustafsson** | **6** | **6**

Second round
(France) C Pioline | 4 | 5
**(Netherlands) J Siemerink** | **6** | **7**
WC | (Netherlands) T Nijssen | 2 | 3
7 | **(France) F Santoro** | **6** | **6**
3 | **(Czech Republic) K Nováček** | **6** | 0 | **6**
(Italy) R Furlan | 2 | **6** | 3
**(Netherlands) J Eltingh** | 4 | **6** | **7^{7}**
6 | (Sweden) M Gustafsson | **6** | 4 | 6^{5}

Quarterfinals
(Netherlands) J Siemerink | 3 | 1
7 | **(France) F Santoro** | **6** | **6**
3 | **(Czech Republic) K Nováček** | **6** | **6**
(Netherlands) J Eltingh | 3 | 1

Semifinals
7 | (France) F Santoro | 3 | 3
3 | (Czechoslovakia) **K Nováček** | **6** | **6**

=== Section 2 ===
First round
5 | (Netherlands) P Haarhuis | 6^{6} | 5
**(Germany) M-K Goellner** | **7^{8}** | **7**
**(Netherlands) M Koevermans** | **6** | **6**
(France) T Guardiola | 4 | 1
(Peru) J Yzaga | 5 | 5
WC | **(Sweden) M Tillström** | **7** | **7**
WC | (Netherlands) T Kempers | **6** | 3 | 6^{2}
4 | **(Commonwealth of Independent States) A Chesnokov** | 3 | **6** | **7^{7}**
8 | **(Argentina) G Pérez Roldán** | **6** | **6**
Q | (Denmark) F Fetterlein | 0 | 3
**(Belgium) B Wuyts** | **7** | 2 | **6**
(Switzerland) C Mezzadri | 5 | **6** | 4
**(France) T Champion** | **6** | **6**
Q | (Czech Republic) J Kodeš Jr. | 1 | 2
(Sweden) L Jonsson | **7^{7}** | 1 | 4
2 | **(Spain) J Arrese** | 6^{4} | **6** | **6**

Second round
(Germany) M-K Goellner | **6** | 1 | 3
**(Netherlands) M Koevermans** | 1 | **6** | **6**
WC | **(Sweden) M Tillström** | **6** | **6**
4 | (Commonwealth of Independent States) A Chesnokov | 0 | 2
8 | (Argentina) G Pérez Roldán | 2 | 1
**(Belgium) B Wuyts** | **6** | **6**
(France) T Champion | **7^{7}** | 2 | 2
2 | **(Spain) J Arrese** | 6^{5} | **6** | **6**

Quarterfinals
(Netherlands) M Koevermans | **6** | 3 | 4
WC | **(Sweden) M Tillström** | 2 | **6** | **6**
(Belgium) B Wuyts | **7^{7}** | 3 | 2
2 | **(Spain) J Arrese** | 6^{5} | **6** | **6**

Semifinals
WC | (Sweden) M Tillström | 3 | 3
2 | (Spain) **J Arrese** | **6** | **6**
