= 1991 Dutch Open (tennis) =

- Date: 22–28 July
- Edition: 34th
- Category: World Series
- Draw: 32S / 16D
- Prize money: $215,000
- Surface: Clay / outdoor
- Location: Hilversum, Netherlands

Champions

Singles
- (Sweden) Magnus Gustafsson

Doubles
- (Netherlands) Richard Krajicek / (Netherlands) Jan Siemerink
- Dutch Open

The 1991 Dutch Open was a men's tennis tournament played on outdoor clay courts in Hilversum in the Netherlands that was part of the World Series of the 1991 ATP Tour. It was the 34th edition of the tournament and was held from 22 July until 28 July 1991. Fourth-seeded Magnus Gustafsson won the singles title.

== Finals ==
=== Singles ===
(Sweden) Magnus Gustafsson defeated (Spain) Jordi Arrese, 5–7, 7–6^{(7–2)}, 2–6, 6–1, 6–0

- It was Gustafsson's 3rd singles title of the year, and the 3rd of his career.

=== Doubles ===
(Netherlands) Richard Krajicek / (Netherlands) Jan Siemerink defeated (Spain) Francisco Clavet / (Sweden) Magnus Gustafsson, 7–5, 6–4
