= 1990 Dutch Open (tennis) =

- Date: 23–29 July
- Edition: 33rd
- Category: World Series
- Draw: 32S / 16D
- Prize money: $215,000
- Surface: Clay / outdoor
- Location: Hilversum, Netherlands

Champions

Singles
- (Spain) Francisco Clavet

Doubles
- (Spain) Sergio Casal / (Spain) Emilio Sánchez
- Dutch Open

The 1990 Dutch Open was an ATP men's tennis tournament staged in Hilversum, Netherlands. It was the 33rd edition of the tournament and was held from 23 July until 29 July 1990. Spain's Francisco Clavet (a lucky loser) won his first individual title of the year, and first of his career. Unseeded Francisco Clavet won the singles title.

== Finals ==
=== Singles ===
(Spain) Francisco Clavet defeated (Belgium) Eduardo Masso 3–6, 6–4, 6–2, 6–0

- It was Clavet's only singles title of the year and the first of his career.

=== Doubles ===
(Spain) Sergio Casal / (Spain) Emilio Sánchez defeated (Netherlands) Paul Haarhuis / (Netherlands) Mark Koevermans, 7–5, 7–5
