= 2022 Dutch Open – Doubles =

Doubles
- 2022 Dutch Open

Final
- Champions: (Netherlands) Robin Haase (Netherlands) Sem Verbeek
- Runners-up: (Colombia) Nicolás Barrientos (Mexico) Miguel Ángel Reyes-Varela
- Score: 6–4, 3–6, [10–7]

Events
Singles	Doubles
- Dutch Open

Luca Castelnuovo and Manuel Guinard were the defending champions but chose not to defend their title.

Robin Haase and Sem Verbeek won the title after defeating Nicolás Barrientos and Miguel Ángel Reyes-Varela 6–4, 3–6, [10–7] in the final.

== Seeds ==
1. (Colombia) Nicolás Barrientos / (Mexico) Miguel Ángel Reyes-Varela (final)
2. (Netherlands) Robin Haase / (Netherlands) Sem Verbeek (champions)
3. (Netherlands) Sander Arends / (Netherlands) David Pel (semifinals)
4. (India) Yuki Bhambri / (India) Saketh Myneni (quarterfinals)

== Draw ==
Key

- Q = Qualifier
- WC = Wild card
- LL = Lucky loser
- Alt = Alternate
- ITF = ITF entry
- PR = Protected ranking
- SR = Special ranking
- SE = Special exempt
- JE = Junior exempt
- JR = Junior Accelerator Programme entrant
- CO = College Accelerator Programme entrant
- NG = Next Gen Accelerator Program entrant
- w/o = Walkover
- r = Retired
- d = Defaulted

First round
1	(Colombia) N Barrientos (Mexico) MÁ Reyes-Varela	6	6
(India) A Chandrasekar (India) VS Prashanth	0	3
(France) T Arribagé (France) L Sanchez	6	7
(France) E Furness (Zimbabwe) CJ Lock	1	5
4	(India) Y Bhambri (India) S Myneni	7^{8}	7
(Spain) J Barranco Cosano (Switzerland) J Nikles	6^{6}	5
(France) A Fils (France) L Van Assche	6	1	[10]
(United States) J Cerretani (Finland) P Niklas-Salminen	4	6	[7]
(Argentina) A Collarini (Italy) S Travaglia	3	2
Alt	(Bulgaria) A Andreev (Ukraine) G Kravchenko	6	6
I Gakhov (Brazil) Oscar José Gutierrez	2	4
3	(Netherlands) S Arends (Netherlands) D Pel	6	6
WC	(Netherlands) Alexander Maarten Jong (Netherlands) B Stevens	6	6
(Bolivia) B Arias (Bolivia) F Zeballos	3	0
WC	(Netherlands) Sidané Pontjodikromo (Netherlands) Deney Wassermann	6^{2}	2
2	(Netherlands) R Haase (Netherlands) S Verbeek	7^{7}	6

Quarterfinals
1	(Colombia) N Barrientos (Mexico) MÁ Reyes-Varela	6	6
(France) T Arribagé (France) L Sanchez	2	1
4	(India) Y Bhambri (India) S Myneni	6	6^{6}	[9]
(France) A Fils (France) L Van Assche	3	7^{8}	[11]
Alt	(Bulgaria) A Andreev (Ukraine) G Kravchenko	2	3
3	(Netherlands) S Arends (Netherlands) D Pel	6	6
WC	(Netherlands) AM Jong (Netherlands) B Stevens	6	4	[8]
2	(Netherlands) R Haase (Netherlands) S Verbeek	2	6	[10]

Semifinals
1	(Colombia) N Barrientos (Mexico) MÁ Reyes-Varela	6	6
(France) A Fils (France) L Van Assche	0	3
3	(Netherlands) S Arends (Netherlands) D Pel	2	4
2	(Netherlands) R Haase (Netherlands) S Verbeek	6	6

Final
1	(Colombia) N Barrientos (Mexico) MÁ Reyes-Varela	4	6	[7]
2	(Netherlands) R Haase (Netherlands) S Verbeek	6	3	[10]
