= 2022 Dutch Open – Singles =

Singles
- 2022 Dutch Open

Final
- Champion: (Netherlands) Tallon Griekspoor
- Runner-up: (Spain) Roberto Carballés Baena
- Score: 6–1, 6–2

Events
| Singles | Doubles |
- Dutch Open

Tallon Griekspoor was the defending champion and successfully defended his title, defeating Roberto Carballés Baena 6–1, 6–2 in the final.

== Seeds ==
1. (Netherlands) Tallon Griekspoor (champion)
2. (Spain) Roberto Carballés Baena (final)
3. (Spain) Bernabé Zapata Miralles (semifinals)
4. (Spain) Carlos Taberner (second round)
5. (Japan) Taro Daniel (quarterfinals)
6. (Italy) Stefano Travaglia (first round)
7. (Germany) Mats Moraing (second round)
8. (Belgium) Zizou Bergs (first round)

== Draw ==
Key

- Q = Qualifier
- WC = Wild card
- LL = Lucky loser
- Alt = Alternate
- ITF = ITF entry
- PR = Protected ranking
- SR = Special ranking
- SE = Special exempt
- JE = Junior exempt
- JR = Junior Accelerator Programme entrant
- CO = College Accelerator Programme entrant
- NG = Next Gen Accelerator Program entrant
- w/o = Walkover
- r = Retired
- d = Defaulted

=== Finals ===
Semifinals
1 | (Netherlands) Tallon Griekspoor | 6 | 3 | 6
Q | Ivan Gakhov | 2 | 6 | 3
3 | (Spain) Bernabé Zapata Miralles | 7^{8} | 4 | 3
2 | (Spain) Roberto Carballés Baena | 6^{6} | 6 | 6

Final
1 | (Netherlands) Tallon Griekspoor | 6 | 6
2 | (Spain) Roberto Carballés Baena | 1 | 2

=== Top half ===
First round
1 | (Netherlands) T Griekspoor | 6 | 6
Alt | (Spain) J Barranco Cosano | 1 | 2
(Hungary) Z Piros | 6 | 7^{8}
(Switzerland) A Ritschard | 1 | 6^{6}
(Ukraine) V Sachko | 6 | 4 | 6
(Argentina) A Collarini | 3 | 6 | 4
(Bulgaria) D Kuzmanov | 4 | 4
7 | (Germany) M Moraing | 6 | 6
4 | (Spain) C Taberner | 7 | 6^{4} | 6
Alt | (Netherlands) R Haase | 5 | 7^{7} | 2
WC | (Netherlands) M Houkes | 7^{7} | 7^{7}
(Kazakhstan) T Skatov | 6^{1} | 6^{4}
Q | I Gakhov | 6 | 7^{7}
WC | (Netherlands) Deney Wassermann | 4 | 6^{3}
Q | (France) A Fils | 6 | 6
6 | (Italy) S Travaglia | 4 | 2

Second round
1 | (Netherlands) T Griekspoor | 6 | 6^{2} | 6
(Hungary) Z Piros | 3 | 7^{7} | 3
(Ukraine) V Sachko | 6 | 7^{8}
7 | (Germany) M Moraing | 3 | 6^{6}
4 | (Spain) C Taberner | 3 | 3
WC | (Netherlands) M Houkes | 6 | 6
Q | I Gakhov | 6 | 6
Q | (France) A Fils | 3 | 1

Quarterfinals
1 | (Netherlands) T Griekspoor | 6 | 7^{7}
(Ukraine) V Sachko | 2 | 6^{4}
WC | (Netherlands) M Houkes | 2 | 7^{7} | 6^{5}
Q | I Gakhov | 6 | 6^{4} | 7^{7}

Semifinals
1 | (Netherlands) T Griekspoor | 6 | 3 | 6
Q | I Gakhov | 2 | 6 | 3

=== Bottom half ===
First round
5 | (Japan) T Daniel | 6 | 5 | 7^{7}
(France) E Furness | 2 | 7 | 6^{3}
LL | (Brazil) Oscar José Gutierrez | 2 | 1
(France) L Lokoli | 6 | 6
Q | (France) T Lamasine | 7^{7} | 5 | 6
(Argentina) N Kicker | 6^{4} | 7 | 3
Q | (Czech Republic) M Krumich | 7 | 2 | 4
3 | (Spain) B Zapata Miralles | 5 | 6 | 6
8 | (Belgium) Z Bergs | 3 | 6 | 4
Q | (France) L Van Assche | 6 | 4 | 6
LL | (France) H Mayot | 4 | 5
WC | (Netherlands) Alexander Maarten Jong | 6 | 7
(Germany) D Masur | 6^{5} | 0
Q | (Bulgaria) A Andreev | 7^{7} | 6
(Netherlands) J Sels | 4 | 3
2 | (Spain) R Carballés Baena | 6 | 6

Second round
5 | (Japan) T Daniel | 6 | 6
(France) L Lokoli | 1 | 2
Q | (France) T Lamasine | 1 | 2
3 | (Spain) B Zapata Miralles | 6 | 6
Q | (France) L Van Assche | 6 | 6
WC | (Netherlands) AM Jong | 0 | 2
Q | (Bulgaria) A Andreev | 4 | 4
2 | (Spain) R Carballés Baena | 6 | 6

Quarterfinals
5 | (Japan) T Daniel | 1 | 7 | 6^{3}
3 | (Spain) B Zapata Miralles | 6 | 5 | 7^{7}
Q | (France) L Van Assche | 3 | 4
2 | (Spain) R Carballés Baena | 6 | 6

Semifinals
3 | (Spain) B Zapata Miralles | 7^{8} | 4 | 3
2 | (Spain) R Carballés Baena | 6^{6} | 6 | 6
