= 1988 Dutch Open – Doubles =

Doubles
- 1988 Dutch Open

Final
- Champions: (Spain) Sergio Casal (Spain) Emilio Sánchez
- Runners-up: (Sweden) Magnus Gustafsson (Argentina) Guillermo Pérez Roldán
- Score: 7–6, 6–3

Events
Singles	Doubles
← 1987 ·	Dutch Open	· 1989 →

Wojciech Fibak and Miloslav Mečíř were the defending champions, but none competed this year.

Sergio Casal and Emilio Sánchez won the final by defeating Magnus Gustafsson and Guillermo Pérez Roldán 7–6, 6–3 in the final.

== Seeds ==
1. (Spain) Sergio Casal / (Spain) Emilio Sánchez (champions)
2. (Czechoslovakia) Petr Korda / (Switzerland) Claudio Mezzadri (quarterfinals)
3. (West Germany) Tore Meinecke / (Netherlands) Tom Nijssen (quarterfinals)
4. (Czechoslovakia) Josef Čihák / (Czechoslovakia) Karel Nováček (first round)

== Draw ==
=== Key ===
- Q = Qualifier
- WC = Wild card
- LL = Lucky loser
- Alt = Alternate
- ITF = ITF entry
- PR = Protected ranking
- SR = Special ranking
- SE = Special exempt
- JE = Junior exempt
- JR = Junior Accelerator Programme entrant
- CO = College Accelerator Programme entrant
- NG = Next Gen Accelerator Program entrant
- w/o = Walkover
- r = Retired
- d = Defaulted

=== Draw ===
First round
1	(Spain) S Casal (Spain) E Sánchez	6	6
(Argentina) E Bengoechea (Argentina) A Mancini	4	2
(West Germany) D Keretić (Australia) C Limberger	2	3
(Japan) S Matsuoka (Chile) P Rebolledo	6	6
3	(West Germany) T Meinecke (Netherlands) T Nijssen	6	6
(West Germany) J Becka (West Germany) H Schwaier	4	2
(United States) R Baxter (Spain) T Carbonell	0	7	6
(Australia) R Barlow (West Germany) T Theine	6	6	3
(Sweden) M Gustafsson (Argentina) G Pérez Roldán	4	6	6
(Sweden) J Gunnarsson (Sweden) N Kroon	6	2	2
(Czechoslovakia) L Pimek (Czechoslovakia) B Stankovič	6	5	7
4	(Czechoslovakia) J Čihák (Czechoslovakia) K Nováček	3	7	6
(Netherlands) M Oosting (Netherlands) H van Boeckel	4	6	6
WC	(Netherlands) HJ Davids (Netherlands) JW Lodder	6	2	3
(Belgium) D Langaskens (Romania) MI Năstase	7	4	6
2	(Czechoslovakia) P Korda (Switzerland) C Mezzadri	6	6	7

Quarterfinals
1	(Spain) S Casal (Spain) E Sánchez	6	7
(Japan) S Matsuoka (Chile) P Rebolledo	1	5
3	(West Germany) T Meinecke (Netherlands) T Nijssen	6	4
(United States) R Baxter (Spain) T Carbonell	7	6
(Sweden) M Gustafsson (Argentina) G Pérez Roldán	2	7	6
(Czechoslovakia) L Pimek (Czechoslovakia) B Stankovič	6	6	3
(Netherlands) M Oosting (Netherlands) H van Boeckel	2	6	7
2	(Czechoslovakia) P Korda (Switzerland) C Mezzadri	6	1	6

Semifinals
1	(Spain) S Casal (Spain) E Sánchez	6	3	6
(United States) R Baxter (Spain) T Carbonell	3	6	4
(Sweden) M Gustafsson (Argentina) G Pérez Roldán	7	3	6
(Netherlands) M Oosting (Netherlands) H van Boeckel	5	6	0

Final
1	(Spain) S Casal (Spain) E Sánchez	7	6
(Sweden) M Gustafsson (Argentina) G Pérez Roldán	6	3
