= 1972 Dutch Open (tennis) =

- Date: 1–7 August
- Edition: 15th
- Category: Non-tour
- Draw: 64S
- Surface: Clay / outdoor
- Location: Hilversum, Netherlands
- Venue: 't Melkhuisje

Champions

Men's singles
- (Australia) John Cooper

Women's singles
- (Netherlands) Betty Stöve

Men's doubles
- (Australia) Ross Case / (Australia) Geoff Masters

Women's doubles
- (Belgium) Michèle Gurdal / (Netherlands) Betty Stöve

Mixed doubles
- (Netherlands) Betty Stöve / (Australia) Bob Howe
← 1971 ·	Dutch Open	· 1973 →

The 1972 Dutch Open was a combined men's and women's tennis tournament staged at 't Melkhuisje in Hilversum, Netherlands. The tournament was played on outdoor clay courts and was held from 1 August until 7 August 1972. It was the 15th edition of the tournament and was a non-tour event, i.e. not part of the main men's or women's circuits. John Cooper and Betty Stöve won the singles titles.

== Finals ==
=== Men's singles ===
(Australia) John Cooper defeated (Austria) Hans Kary 6–1, 3–6, 12–10, 3–6, 6–2

=== Women's singles ===
(Netherlands) Betty Stöve defeated (Netherlands) Marijke Schaar 7–5, 6–3

=== Men's doubles ===
(Australia) Ross Case / (Australia) Geoff Masters defeated (Australia) John Cooper (Australia) Colin Dibley 8–6, 6–4

=== Women's doubles ===
(Belgium) Michèle Gurdal / (Netherlands) Betty Stöve defeated (Indonesia) Lita Liem / (Indonesia) Lany Kaligis 6–4, 6–0

=== Mixed doubles ===
(Netherlands) Betty Stöve / (Australia) Bob Howe defeated (Australia) Wendy Turnbull / (Australia) Colin Dibley 2–6, 9–7, 6–3
