= 1990 Dutch Open – Singles =

Singles
- 1990 Dutch Open

Final
- Champion: (Spain) Francisco Clavet
- Runner-up: (Belgium) Eduardo Masso
- Score: 3–6, 6–4, 6–2, 6–0

Details
- Draw: 32 (2WC / 4Q)
- Seeds: 8

Events
Singles	Doubles
← 1989 ·	Dutch Open	· 1991 →

Karel Nováček was the defending champion, but lost in the first round this year.

Francisco Clavet won the tournament, beating Eduardo Masso in the final, 3–6, 6–4, 6–2, 6–0.

== Seeds ==
1. (Spain) Emilio Sánchez (semifinals)
2. (Argentina) Martín Jaite (quarterfinals)
3. (Spain) Juan Aguilera (second round)
4. (Argentina) Guillermo Pérez Roldán (first round)
5. (Switzerland) Marc Rosset (first round, retired)
6. (Germany) Carl-Uwe Steeb (first round)
7. (Austria) Horst Skoff (first round)
8. (Czechoslovakia) Karel Nováček (first round)

== Draw ==
=== Key ===
- Q = Qualifier
- WC = Wild card
- LL = Lucky loser
- Alt = Alternate
- ITF = ITF entry
- PR = Protected ranking
- SR = Special ranking
- SE = Special exempt
- JE = Junior exempt
- JR = Junior Accelerator Programme entrant
- CO = College Accelerator Programme entrant
- NG = Next Gen Accelerator Program entrant
- w/o = Walkover
- r = Retired
- d = Defaulted

=== Finals ===
Semifinals
1	(Spain) Emilio Sánchez	4	5
Q	(Belgium) Eduardo Masso	6	7
(Italy) Omar Camporese	6	6^{3}	6^{3}
LL	(Spain) Francisco Clavet	4	7^{7}	7^{7}

Final
Q	(Belgium) Eduardo Masso	6	4	2	0
LL	(Spain) Francisco Clavet	3	6	6	6

=== Top half ===
First round
1	(Spain) E Sánchez	6	5	6
WC	(Netherlands) T Nijssen	3	7	4
WC	(Peru) J Yzaga	6	6	2
(Australia) W Masur	7	4	6
Q	(France) O Delaître	6	6
(Spain) J Arrese	1	0
(Spain) J Sánchez	7	4	7
7	(Austria) H Skoff	6	6	6
3	(Spain) J Aguilera	6	7
(Czechoslovakia) M Vajda	4	5
(Socialist Federal Republic of Yugoslavia) G Prpić	5	3
Q	(Belgium) E Masso	7	6
Q	(Spain) S Casal	6	5	6
(Uruguay) D Pérez	1	7	2
(Spain) S Bruguera	6	6
6	(Germany) C-U Steeb	3	1

Second round
1	(Spain) E Sánchez	4	7	6
(Australia) W Masur	6	6	4
Q	(France) O Delaître	3	6	6
(Spain) J Sánchez	6	4	4
3	(Spain) J Aguilera	3	6	2
Q	(Belgium) E Masso	6	3	6
Q	(Spain) S Casal	1	3
(Spain) S Bruguera	6	6

Quarterfinals
1	(Spain) E Sánchez	6	7^{7}
Q	(France) O Delaître	2	6^{1}
Q	(Belgium) E Masso	4	7	6
(Spain) S Bruguera	6	5	0

Semifinals
1	(Spain) E Sánchez	4	5
Q	(Belgium) E Masso	6	7

=== Bottom half ===
First round
5	(Switzerland) M Rosset	2	1^{r}
Q	(Spain) C Costa	6	3
(Argentina) F Davín	3	1
(Haiti) R Agénor	6	6
(France) F Santoro	3	5
(Italy) O Camporese	6	7
(Uruguay) M Filippini	6	6
4	(Argentina) G Pérez Roldán	3	4
8	(Czechoslovakia) K Nováček	6	6
LL	(Spain) F Clavet	7	7
(Netherlands) P Haarhuis	6	6
(Argentina) A Mancini	2	2
(Spain) T Carbonell	7	3	6
(Argentina) R Azar	6	6	3
(Netherlands) M Koevermans	6	1	3
2	(Argentina) M Jaite	1	6	6

Second round
Q	(Spain) C Costa	6	6	1
(Haiti) R Agénor	7	3	6
(Italy) O Camporese	6	6	7
(Uruguay) M Filippini	7	1	6
LL	(Spain) F Clavet	7	6
(Netherlands) P Haarhuis	5	2
(Spain) T Carbonell	6	5	4
2	(Argentina) M Jaite	4	7	6

Quarterfinals
(Haiti) R Agénor	5	6^{2}
(Italy) O Camporese	7	7^{7}
LL	(Spain) F Clavet	5	6	6
2	(Argentina) M Jaite	7	1	2

Semifinals
(Italy) O Camporese	6	6^{3}	6^{3}
LL	(Spain) F Clavet	4	7^{7}	7^{7}
