= 1992 Dutch Open (tennis) =

- Date: 20–26 July
- Edition: 35th
- Category: World Series
- Draw: 32S / 16D
- Prize money: $225,000
- Surface: Clay / outdoor
- Location: Hilversum, Netherlands
- Venue: 't Melkhuisje

Champions

Singles
- (Czechoslovakia) Karel Nováček

Doubles
- (Netherlands) Paul Haarhuis / (Netherlands) Mark Koevermans
- Dutch Open

The 1992 Dutch Open was an ATP men's tennis tournament staged in Hilversum, Netherlands that was part of the World Series of the 1992 ATP Tour. It was the 35th edition of the tournament and was held from 20 July until 26 July 1992. Czechoslovakia's Karel Nováček, who was seeded third, won his first individual title of the year, and eighth of his career.

== Finals ==
=== Singles ===
(Czechoslovakia) Karel Nováček defeated (Spain) Jordi Arrese 6–2, 6–3, 2–6, 7–5

- It was Nováček 1st singles title of the year and the 8th of his career.

=== Doubles ===
(Netherlands) Paul Haarhuis / (Netherlands) Mark Koevermans defeated (Sweden) Mårten Renström / (Sweden) Mikael Tillström, 6–7, 6–1, 6–4
