= 1968 Dutch Open (tennis) =

- Date: 22–28 July
- Edition: 11th
- Draw: 32S / 16D
- Surface: Clay / outdoor
- Location: Hilversum, Netherlands
- Venue: 't Melkhuisje

Champions

Men's singles
- (South Africa) Bob Maud

Women's singles
- (Australia) Margaret Court

Men's doubles
- (Czechoslovakia) Jan Kodeš / (Czechoslovakia) Jan Kukal

Women's doubles
- (South Africa) Annette Du Plooy / (South Africa) Pat Walkden

Mixed doubles
- (South Africa) Annette Du Plooy / (South Africa) Bob Maud
- Dutch Open

The 1968 Dutch Open was a combined men's and women's tennis tournament staged at 't Melkhuisje in Hilversum, Netherlands. The tournament was played on outdoor clay courts and was held from 22 July to 28 July 1968. It was the 11th edition of the tournament and the first in the Open era of tennis. Bob Maud and Margaret Smith won the singles titles.

== Finals ==
=== Men's singles ===
(South Africa) Bob Maud defeated (Hungary) István Gulyás 7–9, 7–5, 6–0, 1–6, 13–11

=== Women's singles ===
(Australia) Margaret Court defeated (Australia) Judy Tegart 8–6, 6–0

=== Men's doubles ===
(Czechoslovakia) Jan Kodeš / (Czechoslovakia) Jan Kukal defeated (West Germany) Ingo Buding / (West Germany) Harald Elschenbroich 6–3, 6–1

=== Women's doubles ===
(South Africa) Annette du Plooy / (South Africa) Pat Walkden defeated (Australia) Judy Tegart / (Netherlands) Astrid Suurbeek 6–2, 3–6, 6–3

=== Mixed doubles ===
(South Africa) Annette du Plooy / (South Africa) Bob Maud defeated (Australia) Margaret Court / (Netherlands) Tom Okker two sets
