= Gerald Marzenell =

German tennis player

- Country (sports): West Germany; Germany
- Born: 6 February 1964 (age 61); Mannheim, West Germany
- Height: 5 ft 11 in (180 cm)
- Plays: Right-handed
- Prize money: $16,134

Singles
- Career record: 1–1
- Highest ranking: No. 182 (15 February 1988)

Grand Slam singles results
- Wimbledon: Q2 (1989)

Doubles
- Career record: 0–0
- Highest ranking: No. 378 (28 November 1988)

Gerald Marzenell (born 6 February 1964) is a German former professional tennis player.

A right-handed player from Mannheim, Marzenell played college tennis in the United States at the University of Houston prior to his professional career.

Marzenell reached a career high ranking of 182 in the world and featured in the Wimbledon qualifying draw on two occasions during the late 1980s. His best performance on the Grand Prix circuit came when he defeated Petr Korda to make the round of 16 at the 1988 Dutch Open.
