= Richard Krajicek =

Dutch tennis player (born 1971)

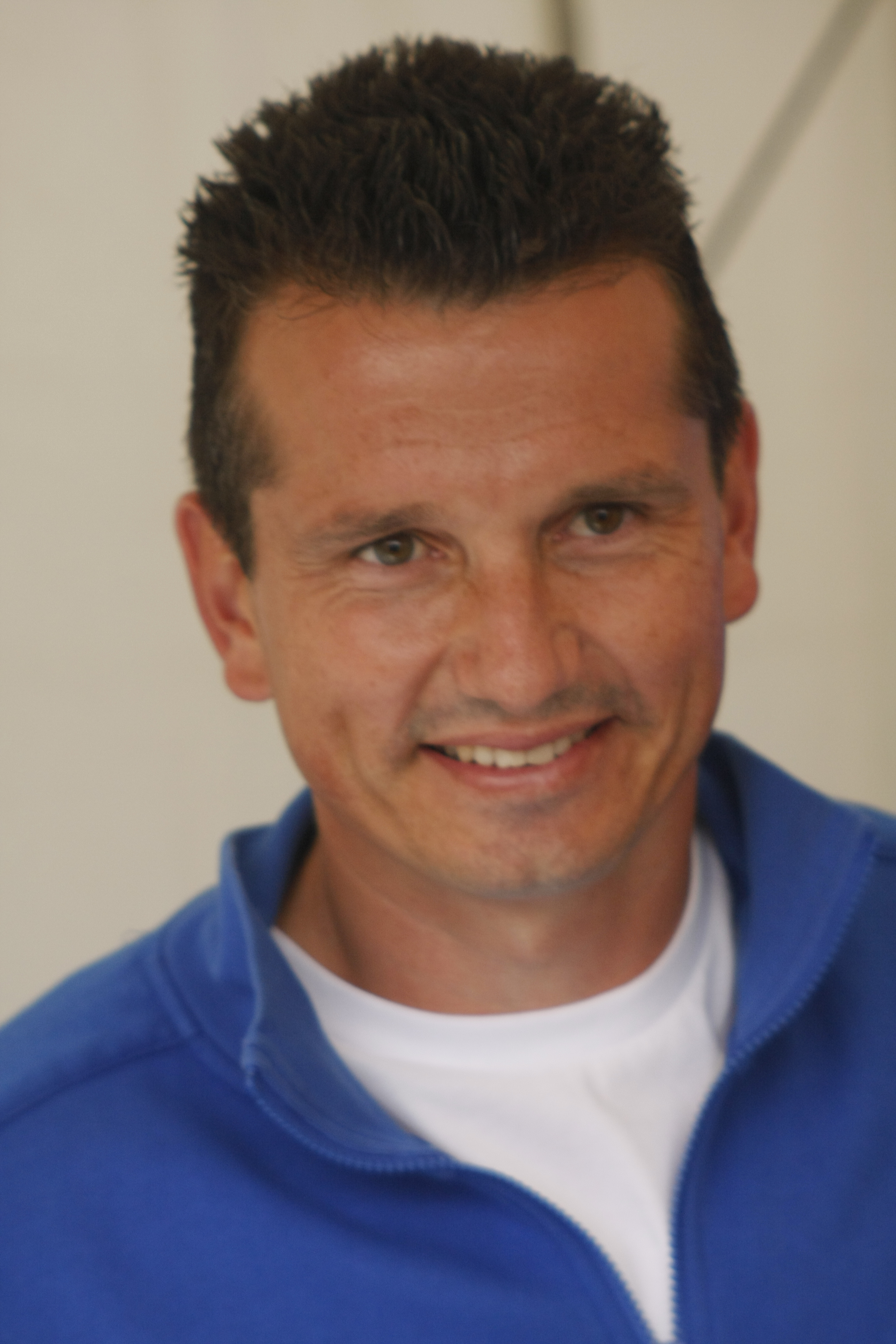
- Krajicek at the Eastbourne International tennis tournament in 2011.
- Country (sports): Netherlands
- Residence: Muiderberg, Netherlands
- Born: 6 December 1971 (age 54) Rotterdam, Netherlands
- Height: 1.96 m (6 ft 5 in)
- Turned pro: 1989
- Retired: 2003
- Plays: Right-handed (one-handed backhand)
- Prize money: $10,077,425

Singles
- Career record: 411–219 (65.2%)
- Career titles: 17
- Highest ranking: No. 4 (29 March 1999)

Grand Slam singles results
- Australian Open: SF (1992)
- French Open: SF (1993)
- Wimbledon: W (1996)
- US Open: QF (1997, 1999, 2000)

Other tournaments
- Tour Finals: SF (1996)
- Grand Slam Cup: QF (1992, 1999)

Doubles
- Career record: 77–60 (56.2%)
- Career titles: 3
- Highest ranking: No. 45 (26 July 1993)

Grand Slam doubles results
- Australian Open: SF (1992)
- French Open: 3R (1991)
- Wimbledon: 2R (1991)
- US Open: 1R (1995)

Team competitions
- Davis Cup: QF (1993, 1994, 1995)

Richard Peter Stanislav Krajicek (Czech: Krajíček; born 6 December 1971) is a Dutch former professional tennis player and tournament director. Krajicek won 17 singles titles during his career, including the 1996 Wimbledon Championships, becoming the first (and only) Dutchman to win a major singles title. He reached a career high world No. 4 ranking in men's singles by the Association of Tennis Professionals (ATP) in March 1999. Retiring from the sport in 2003, Krajicek has been the tournament director of the Rotterdam Open since 2004. He is also the author of various sports books.

== Personal life ==
Richard Krajicek is the son of Czech immigrants and grew up in The Hague. In primary school, he was in the same class as later professional road bicyle racer Michael Boogerd. Nicknamed "de Kraai" (Dutch for "the crow") in his home country, one of Krajicek's siblings is Michaëlla Krajicek, a half-sister and fellow tennis professional. A distant cousin of his is another tennis player, the American Austin Krajicek.

In the nineties Krajicek had a relationship with Italian actress and model Lory Del Santo, with whom he had a son who was born prematurely and died of an infection after two weeks of life. In 1999, he married model, writer and hostess of Holland's Next Top Model and Benelux's Next Top Model, Daphne Deckers, with whom he lives in Muiderberg and has two children (a son and a daughter).

Krajicek is a member of the People's Party for Freedom and Democracy (VVD), a political party in the Netherlands.

== Career ==
Richard Krajicek began playing tennis at the age of four. As a youngster he won both the Dutch under-12 and the under-14 National Championships twice. His biggest achievement as a youngster was winning the Wiltshire Open in the UK after beating Steven White in straight sets in the final. He turned professional in 1989, and in 1991 won his first top-level singles title in Hong Kong and his first tour doubles title at the Dutch Open.

In 1992, the 1.95 metres (6 feet 5 inches) tall Dutchman reached his first Grand Slam semi-finals at the Australian Open. He had to withdraw from this semi-final match due to a shoulder injury. The next year, he reached the semi-finals at the French Open, where he lost in four sets to the defending champion Jim Courier. Also in 1992, Krajicek made a controversial comment regarding equal pay for women in Grand Slam events, saying, "Eighty percent of the top 100 women are fat pigs who don't deserve equal pay." Later, he jokingly clarified his comments, remarking, "What I meant to say was that only 75 percent are fat pigs."

At the 1996 Italian Open, Krajicek reached the final, before losing in four sets to the reigning champion, Thomas Muster. At the French Open later that year, Krajicek was the only player to take a set off the eventual champion, Yevgeny Kafelnikov, during their quarterfinal match.

Coming into 1996 Wimbledon, Krajicek had never previously progressed beyond the fourth round at the tournament and had lost in the first round in the two previous years. He was seen as a player with potential, having one of the fastest serves at the time, but was not considered to be a strong contender for the title. The clear favourite was Pete Sampras, who had won the title for the past three consecutive years. Despite being ranked within the world's top 16, Krajicek just missed out on the seedings for the tournament, but when seventh seed (and world No. 2) Thomas Muster pulled out shortly before the tournament due to an injury, Krajicek was declared the 17th seed and moved to Muster's place in the draw. Opinions differ, therefore, on whether he won the tournament as an unseeded player.

Krajicek beat former champion Michael Stich in the fourth round and met Sampras in the quarterfinals. By that time, Krajicek had managed to turn his notably weak slice backhand into an aggressive top-spin shot. Krajicek defeated Sampras in straight sets, becoming the only player to beat Sampras in a Wimbledon singles match in the eight-year period from 1993 until Sampras's fourth-round loss to Roger Federer in 2001. (Krajicek's Wimbledon victory over Sampras proved to be no fluke, since he ended his career with a 6–4 record against the American player.) Next, Krajicek beat Australia's Jason Stoltenberg in the semi-finals, and went on to face American MaliVai Washington in the final. He won the final in straight sets to become the first Dutchman to win Wimbledon.

In 1997, Krajicek's defence of his Wimbledon title ended in the fourth round, when Tim Henman defeated him in four sets.

In 1998, Krajicek was in the Wimbledon semi-finals again, losing to Goran Ivanišević in a marathon match, 13–15 in the fifth set, with both players serving a combined 38 aces. His final attempt at a Wimbledon title was in 2002, when he lost in the quarterfinals to Xavier Malisse. Krajicek beat world No. 5 Andre Agassi, world No. 1 Sampras and world No. 9 Yevgeny Kafelnikov on his way to the Stuttgart Masters title in November.

At the 1999 US Open, Krajicek lost a quarterfinal matchup to Yevgeny Kafelnikov. Despite the loss, he set several most aces records that day. In the 2000 U.S. Open, Krajicek met Sampras in the quarterfinals, winning the first set and going up 6–2 during the second-set tiebreaker, but then losing six straight points and the match. In 2000, Krajicek was awarded the ATP Arthur Ashe Humanitarian award for his efforts to help youth in his home country. He was named ATP Comeback Player of the Year in 2002.

Krajicek retired from the professional tour in 2003. During his career, he won 17 singles titles and three doubles titles. His career-high singles ranking was world No. 4 in 1999.

Since retiring from the ATP Tour, Krajicek runs The Richard Krajicek Foundation, which builds sports facilities for children in inner-city areas in the Netherlands. In 2004, Krajicek became the tournament director of the ABN AMRO World Tennis Tournament in Rotterdam.

In 2005, he published a book on tennis, Fast Balls (Dutch: Harde Ballen).

== Significant finals ==
=== Singles: 1 (1 title) ===
Result	Year	Championship	Surface	Opponent	Score
Win	1996	Wimbledon	Grass	(United States) MaliVai Washington	6–3, 6–4, 6–3

=== Masters Series finals ===
==== Singles: 6 (2 titles, 4 runners-up) ====
Result	Year	Tournament	Surface	Opponent	Score
Loss	1996	Rome	Clay	(Austria) Thomas Muster	2–6, 4–6, 6–3, 3–6
Loss	1997	Stuttgart	Carpet (i)	(Czech Republic) Petr Korda	6–7^{(6–8)}, 2–6, 4–6
Loss	1998	Canada (Toronto)	Hard	(Australia) Patrick Rafter	6–7^{(3–7)}, 4–6
Win	1998	Stuttgart	Carpet (i)	(Russia) Yevgeny Kafelnikov	6–4, 6–3, 6–3
Win	1999	Key Biscayne	Hard	(France) Sébastien Grosjean	4–6, 6–1, 6–2, 7–5
Loss	1999	Stuttgart	Carpet (i)	(Sweden) Thomas Enqvist	1–6, 4–6, 7–5, 5–7

== Career finals ==
=== Singles: 26 (17 titles, 9 runners-up) ===
Legend Grand Slam (1–0) Tennis Masters Cup (0–0) ATP Super 9 (2–4) ATP Championship Series (5–3) ATP World Series (9–2)	Finals by surface Hard (7–5) Clay (1–1) Grass (3–1) Carpet (6–2)

Result	W/L	Date	Tournament	Category	Surface	Opponent	Score
Win	1–0	Apr 1991	Hong Kong, UK	World Series	Hard	(Australia) Wally Masur	6–2, 3–6, 6–3
Loss	1–1	Apr 1992	Tokyo, Japan	Championships Series	Hard	(United States) Jim Courier	4–6, 4–6, 6–7^{(3–7)}
Win	2–1	Aug 1992	Los Angeles, U.S.	World Series	Hard	(Australia) Mark Woodforde	6–4, 2–6, 6–4
Win	3–1	Nov 1992	Antwerp, Belgium	World Series	Carpet (i)	(Australia) Mark Woodforde	6–2, 6–2
Loss	3–2	Feb 1993	Stuttgart, Germany	Championships Series	Carpet (i)	(Germany) Michael Stich	6–4, 5–7, 6–7^{(4–7)}, 6–3, 5–7
Win	4–2	Aug 1993	Los Angeles, U.S.	World Series	Hard	(United States) Michael Chang	0–6, 7–6^{(7–3)}, 7–6^{(7–5)}
Win	5–2	Apr 1994	Barcelona, Spain	Championships Series	Clay	(Spain) Carlos Costa	6–4, 7–6^{(8–6)}, 6–2
Win	6–2	Jun 1994	Rosmalen, Netherlands	World Series	Grass	(Germany) Karsten Braasch	6–3, 6–4
Win	7–2	Oct 1994	Sydney, Australia	Championships Series	Hard (i)	(Germany) Boris Becker	7–6^{(7–5)}, 7–6^{(9–7)}, 2–6, 6–3
Win	8–2	Feb 1995	Stuttgart, Germany	Championships Series	Carpet (i)	(Germany) Michael Stich	7–6^{(7–4)}, 6–3, 6–7^{(6–8)}, 1–6, 6–3
Win	9–2	Mar 1995	Rotterdam, Netherlands	World Series	Carpet (i)	(Netherlands) Paul Haarhuis	7–6^{(7–5)}, 6–4
Loss	9–3	Aug 1995	New Haven, U.S.	Championships Series	Hard	(United States) Andre Agassi	6–3, 6–7^{(2–7)}, 3–6
Loss	9–4	May 1996	Rome, Italy	Super 9	Clay	(Austria) Thomas Muster	2–6, 4–6, 6–3, 3–6
Win	10–4	Jul 1996	Wimbledon, UK	Grand Slam	Grass	(United States) MaliVai Washington	6–3, 6–4, 6–3
Loss	10–5	Aug 1996	Los Angeles, U.S.	World Series	Hard	(United States) Michael Chang	4–6, 3–6
Win	11–5	Mar 1997	Rotterdam, Netherlands	World Series	Carpet (i)	(Czech Republic) Daniel Vacek	7–6^{(7–4)}, 7–6^{(7–5)}
Win	12–5	Apr 1997	Tokyo, Japan	Championships Series	Hard	(France) Lionel Roux	6–2, 3–6, 6–1
Win	13–5	Jun 1997	Rosmalen, Netherlands	World Series	Grass	(France) Guillaume Raoux	6–4, 7–6^{(9–7)}
Loss	13–6	Oct 1997	Stuttgart, Germany	Super 9	Carpet (i)	(Czech Republic) Petr Korda	6–7^{(6–8)}, 2–6, 4–6
Win	14–6	Feb 1998	St. Petersburg, Russia	World Series	Carpet (i)	(Switzerland) Marc Rosset	6–4, 7–6^{(7–5)}
Loss	14–7	Aug 1998	Toronto, Canada	Super 9	Hard	(Australia) Patrick Rafter	6–7^{(3–7)}, 4–6
Win	15–7	Nov 1998	Stuttgart, Germany	Super 9	Hard (i)	(Russia) Yevgeny Kafelnikov	6–4, 6–3, 6–3
Win	16–7	Mar 1999	London, UK	Championships Series	Carpet (i)	(United Kingdom) Greg Rusedski	7–6^{(8–6)}, 6–7^{(5–7)}, 7–5
Win	17–7	Mar 1999	Miami, U.S.	Super 9	Hard	(France) Sébastien Grosjean	4–6, 6–1, 6–2, 7–5
Loss	17–8	Nov 1999	Stuttgart, Germany	Super 9	Hard (i)	(Sweden) Thomas Enqvist	1–6, 4–6, 7–5, 5–7
Loss	17–9	Jun 2000	Halle, Germany	International Series	Grass	(Germany) David Prinosil	3–6, 2–6

=== Doubles: 6 (3 titles, 3 runner-ups) ===
Legend Grand Slam Tournaments (0–0) ATP World Tour Finals (0–0) ATP Masters 1000 Series (1–0) ATP 500 Series (0–0) ATP 250 Series (2–3)	Finals by surface Hard (1–0) Clay (1–2) Grass (1–1) Carpet (0–0)	Finals by setting Outdoors (3–3) Indoors (0–0)

Result	W/L	Date	Tournament	Tier	Surface	Partner	Opponents	Score
Loss	0–1	Oct 1990	Athens, Greece	World Series	Clay	(Netherlands) Tom Kempers	(Spain) Sergio Casal (Spain) Javier Sánchez	6–4, 6–7, 3–6
Loss	0–2	Jun 1991	Rosmalen, Netherlands	World Series	Grass	(Netherlands) Jan Siemerink	(Netherlands) Hendrik Jan Davids (Netherlands) Paul Haarhuis	3–6, 6–7
Win	1–2	Jul 1991	Hilversum, Netherlands	World Series	Clay	(Netherlands) Jan Siemerink	(Spain) Francisco Clavet (Sweden) Magnus Gustafsson	7–5, 6–4
Win	2–2	Mar 1993	Miami, United States	Masters Series	Hard	(Netherlands) Jan Siemerink	(United States) Patrick McEnroe (United States) Jonathan Stark	6–7, 6–4, 7–6
Loss	2–3	Mar 1994	Estoril, Portugal	World Series	Clay	(Netherlands) Menno Oosting	(Italy) Cristian Brandi (Italy) Federico Mordegan	w/o
Win	3–3	Jun 1995	Rosmalen, Netherlands	World Series	Grass	(Netherlands) Jan Siemerink	(Netherlands) Hendrik Jan Davids (Russia) Andrei Olhovskiy	7–5, 6–3

== Performance timelines ==
Key
W	F	SF	QF	#R	RR	Q#	DNQ	A	NH

(W) winner; (F) finalist; (SF) semifinalist; (QF) quarterfinalist; (#R) rounds 4, 3, 2, 1; (RR) round-robin stage; (Q#) qualification round; (DNQ) did not qualify; (A) absent; (NH) not held; (SR) strike rate (events won / competed); (W–L) win–loss record.

Singles

Tournament	1989	1990	1991	1992	1993	1994	1995	1996	1997	1998	1999	2000	2001	2002	2003	Career SR	Career win–loss
Grand Slam tournaments
Australian Open	A	A	4R	SF	2R	A	2R	3R	A	A	3R	2R	A	A	2R	0 / 8	16–7
French Open	A	A	2R	3R	SF	3R	2R	QF	3R	3R	2R	3R	A	A	A	0 / 10	22–10
Wimbledon	A	A	3R	3R	4R	1R	1R	W	4R	SF	3R	2R	A	QF	A	1 / 11	29–10
U.S. Open	A	A	1R	4R	4R	2R	3R	1R	QF	3R	QF	QF	A	1R	A	0 / 11	22–11
Grand Slam SR	0 / 0	0 / 0	0 / 4	0 / 4	0 / 4	0 / 3	0 / 4	1 / 4	0 / 3	0 / 3	0 / 4	0 / 4	0 / 0	0 / 2	0 / 1	1 / 40	N/A
Annual win–loss	0–0	0–0	6–4	12–3	12–4	3–3	4–4	13–3	8–3	9–3	9–3	8–4	0–0	4–2	1–1	N/A	89–38
Year-end championships
Tennis Masters Cup	Did not qualify			RR	DNQ			SF	Did not qualify							0 / 2	3–4
Grand Slam Cup	NH	DNQ		QF	DNQ			1R	DNQ		QF	Not Held				0 / 3	2–3
ATP Masters Series
Indian Wells	A	A	A	3R	A	A	A	A	A	A	QF	A	A	A	1R	0 / 3	4–3
Miami	A	A	1R	QF	QF	A	2R	4R	4R	A	W	A	A	A	1R	1 / 8	16–7
Monte Carlo	A	A	A	1R	3R	2R	QF	3R	QF	SF	A	3R	A	A	A	0 / 8	15–8
Rome	A	A	1R	1R	1R	3R	A	F	2R	QF	2R	1R	A	A	A	0 / 9	12–9
Hamburg	A	A	A	QF	QF	QF	3R	3R	2R	3R	2R	A	A	A	A	0 / 8	13–8
Montreal/Toronto	A	A	A	A	A	A	2R	A	QF	F	2R	3R	A	1R	A	0 / 6	9–6
Cincinnati	A	A	A	3R	2R	1R	1R	3R	2R	3R	QF	1R	A	3R	A	0 / 10	9–10
Madrid (Stuttgart)	A	A	A	A	A	2R	QF	3R	F	W	F	2R	A	A	A	1 / 7	17–6
Paris	A	A	1R	3R	2R	3R	QF	2R	QF	2R	2R	A	A	A	A	0 / 9	6–9
Masters Series SR	0 / 0	0 / 0	0 / 3	0 / 7	0 / 6	0 / 6	0 / 7	0 / 7	0 / 8	1 / 7	1 / 8	0 / 5	0 / 0	0 / 2	0 / 2	2 / 68	N/A
Annual win–loss	0–0	0–0	0–3	11–7	7–6	7–6	10–7	13–7	14–8	17–6	15–7	5–5	0–0	2–2	0–2	N/A	101–66
Year-end ranking	392	129	45	10	15	17	11	7	11	10	10	36	–	112	147	N/A	

== Top 10 wins ==
Season	1989	1990	1991	1992	1993	1994	1995	1996	1997	1998	1999	2000	2001	2002	2003	Total
Wins	0	0	1	10	4	4	5	3	4	8	3	2	0	0	0	44

#	Player	Rank	Event	Surface	Rd	Score	KR
1991
1.	(Sweden) Stefan Edberg	2	New Haven, United States	Hard	3R	4–6, 6–3, 6–3	37
1992
2.	(Czechoslovakia) Ivan Lendl	5	Sydney, Australia	Hard	1R	5–7, 6–3, 6–3	44
3.	(Germany) Michael Stich	5	Australian Open, Melbourne	Hard	QF	5–7, 7–6^{(7–2)}, 6–7^{(1–7)}, 6–4, 6–4	45
4.	(Croatia) Goran Ivanišević	7	Indian Wells, United States	Hard	2R	6–0, 6–3	27
5.	(Germany) Michael Stich	5	Tokyo, Japan	Hard	QF	7–6^{(7–5)}, 6–4	30
6.	(Sweden) Stefan Edberg	1	Tokyo, Japan	Hard	SF	6–3, 7–5	30
7.	(Croatia) Goran Ivanišević	8	Hamburg, Germany	Clay	3R	7–5, 6–2	16
8.	(United States) Ivan Lendl	9	Sydney, Australia	Hard (i)	QF	7–6^{(7–1)}, 7–5	15
9.	(Czechoslovakia) Petr Korda	7	Antwerp, Belgium	Carpet (i)	QF	3–6, 6–1, 7–6^{(9–7)}	13
10.	(United States) Jim Courier	1	Antwerp, Belgium	Carpet (i)	SF	4–6, 6–4, 7–5	13
11.	(United States) Michael Chang	5	ATP Tour World Championships, Frankfurt, Germany	Carpet (i)	RR	2–6, 6–3, 7–6^{(7–4)}	10
1993
12.	(Spain) Sergi Bruguera	10	Stuttgart, Germany	Carpet (i)	1R	6–2, 6–3	13
13.	(United States) Andre Agassi	8	Miami, United States	Hard	4R	6–2, 7–5	11
14.	(United States) Pete Sampras	1	Los Angeles, United States	Hard	SF	6–4, 3–6, 7–6^{(7–3)}	10
15.	(United States) Michael Chang	9	Los Angeles, United States	Hard	F	0–6, 7–6^{(7–3)}, 7–6^{(7–5)}	10
1994
16.	(Spain) Sergi Bruguera	4	Barcelona, Spain	Clay	QF	7–5, 6–3	24
17.	(Austria) Thomas Muster	10	Hamburg, Germany	Clay	3R	6–4, 6–4	20
18.	(United States) Pete Sampras	1	Davis Cup, Rotterdam, Netherlands	Hard	RR	2–6, 7–5, 7–6^{(7–5)}, 7–5	26
19.	(Germany) Boris Becker	7	Sydney, Australia	Hard (i)	F	7–6^{(7–5)}, 7–6^{(9–7)}, 2–6, 6–3	32
1995
20.	(South Africa) Wayne Ferreira	10	Stuttgart, Germany	Carpet (i)	2R	6–3, 7–6^{(7–0)}	16
21.	(Germany) Michael Stich	9	Stuttgart, Germany	Carpet (i)	F	7–6^{(7–4)}, 6–3, 6–7^{(6–8)}, 1–6, 6–3	16
22.	(Germany) Boris Becker	4	New Haven, United States	Hard	QF	7–6^{(7–5)}, 3–6, 7–6^{(7–5)}	14
23.	(Russia) Yevgeny Kafelnikov	6	New Haven, United States	Hard	SF	6–4, 6–4	14
24.	(Germany) Boris Becker	4	Essen, Germany	Carpet (i)	3R	6–4, 6–7^{(4–7)}, 6–3	15
1996
25.	(United States) Pete Sampras	1	Wimbledon, United Kingdom	Grass	QF	7–5, 7–6^{(7–3)}, 6–4	13
26.	(United States) Michael Chang	2	ATP Tour World Championships, Frankfurt	Carpet (i)	RR	6–4, 6–4	8
27.	(Austria) Thomas Muster	5	ATP Tour World Championships, Frankfurt	Carpet (i)	RR	7–6^{(7–4)}, 6–7^{(5–7)}, 6–3	8
1997
28.	(Sweden) Thomas Enqvist	8	Rotterdam, Netherlands	Carpet (i)	SF	6–7^{(5–7)}, 6–3, 6–4	7
29.	(United States) Michael Chang	2	Rosmalen, Netherlands	Grass	SF	6–7^{(5–7)}, 6–3, 6–4	6
30.	(United States) Pete Sampras	1	Stuttgart, Germany	Carpet (i)	3R	6–4, 6–4	15
31.	(Australia) Pat Rafter	3	Paris, France	Carpet (i)	3R	7–5, 6–2	11
1998
32.	(United Kingdom) Greg Rusedski	6	Rotterdam, Netherlands	Carpet (i)	QF	3–6, 7–6^{(7–2)}, 7–6^{(7–3)}	10
33.	(Czech Republic) Petr Korda	3	Monte-Carlo, Monaco	Clay	QF	4–6, 7–6^{(7–1)}, 6–1	13
34.	(Russia) Yevgeny Kafelnikov	6	Rome, Italy	Clay	3R	6–2, 3–6, 7–6^{(8–6)}	11
35.	(Russia) Yevgeny Kafelnikov	8	Toronto, Canada	Hard	QF	6–4, 6–4	9
36.	(United Kingdom) Tim Henman	10	New Haven, United States	Hard	QF	5–7, 6–2, 7–6^{(18–16)}	6
37.	(United States) Andre Agassi	5	Stuttgart, Germany	Hard (i)	3R	6–3, 6–4	11
38.	(United States) Pete Sampras	1	Stuttgart, Germany	Hard (i)	SF	6–7^{(2–7)}, 6–4, 7–6^{(7–5)}	11
39.	(Russia) Yevgeny Kafelnikov	8	Stuttgart, Germany	Hard (i)	F	6–4, 6–3, 6–3	11
1999
40.	(United Kingdom) Greg Rusedski	10	London, United Kingdom	Carpet (i)	F	7–6^{(8–6)}, 6–7^{(5–7)}, 7–5	9
41.	(United States) Pete Sampras	2	Miami, United States	Hard	QF	6–2, 7–6^{(8–6)}	7
42.	(United Kingdom) Greg Rusedski	6	Stuttgart, Germany	Hard (i)	SF	6–4, 6–4	8
2000
43.	(Sweden) Thomas Enqvist	9	Monte-Carlo, Monaco	Clay	2R	7–5, 6–1	43
44.	(Sweden) Magnus Norman	3	Toronto, Canada	Hard	1R	7–5, 7–6^{(9–7)}	24

== Honours ==
- Knight of the Order of the Netherlands Lion (1997)
- Officer of the Order of Orange-Nassau (17 November 2017)
- Medal of Honour for Ingenuity and Entrepreneurship of the Order of the House of Orange (17 juni 2024)

== Bibliography ==
List of books written by Richard Krajicek:

- Een half jaar netpost (2003) with Tino Bakker
- Naar de top (2005) with Anja de Crom
- Harde ballen (2005)
- Honger naar de bal (2006)
- Alle ballen verzamelen (2007)

Awards and achievements
Preceded by Danny Nelissen	Dutch Sportsman of the year 1996	Succeeded by Marcel Wouda
Preceded by Mac Winker	ATP Arthur Ashe Humanitarian of the Year; 2000	Succeeded by Andre Agassi
