= 2022 Dutch Open (tennis) =

- Date: 11 – 17 July
- Surface: Clay / outdoor
- Location: Amersfoort, Netherlands

Champions

Singles
- (Netherlands) Tallon Griekspoor

Doubles
- (Netherlands) Robin Haase / (Netherlands) Sem Verbeek
- Dutch Open

The 2022 Dutch Open, also known by its sponsored name Van Mossel Kia Dutch Open, was a professional tennis tournament played on clay courts. It was the third edition of the Challenger tournament which was part of the 2022 ATP Challenger Tour. It took place in Amersfoort, Netherlands between 11 and 17 July 2022.

== Singles main draw entrants ==
=== Seeds ===
Country	Player	Rank^{1}	Seed
NED	Tallon Griekspoor	53	1
ESP	Roberto Carballés Baena	87	2
ESP	Bernabé Zapata Miralles	90	3
ESP	Carlos Taberner	98	4
JPN	Taro Daniel	118	5
ITA	Stefano Travaglia	139	6
GER	Mats Moraing	140	7
BEL	Zizou Bergs	146	8

- ^{1} Rankings are as of 27 June 2022.

=== Other entrants ===
The following players received wildcards into the singles main draw:

- (Netherlands) Max Houkes
- (Netherlands) Alexander Maarten Jong
- (Netherlands) Deney Wassermann

The following players received entry into the singles main draw as alternates:

- (Spain) Javier Barranco Cosano
- (Netherlands) Robin Haase

The following players received entry from the qualifying draw:

- (Bulgaria) Adrian Andreev
- (France) Arthur Fils
- Ivan Gakhov
- (Czech Republic) Martin Krumich
- (France) Tristan Lamasine
- (France) Luca Van Assche

The following players received entry as lucky losers:

- (Brazil) Oscar José Gutierrez
- (France) Harold Mayot

== Champions ==
=== Singles ===
- (Netherlands) Tallon Griekspoor def. (Spain) Roberto Carballés Baena 6–1, 6–2.

=== Doubles ===
- (Netherlands) Robin Haase / (Netherlands) Sem Verbeek def. (Colombia) Nicolás Barrientos / (Mexico) Miguel Ángel Reyes-Varela 6–4, 3–6, [10–7].
