= 1989 Dutch Open (tennis) =

- Date: 24–30 July
- Edition: 32nd
- Category: Grand Prix
- Draw: 32S
- Prize money: $150,000
- Surface: Clay
- Location: Hilversum, The Netherlands
- Venue: 't Melkhuisje

Champions

Singles
- (Czechoslovakia) Karel Nováček

Doubles
- Final cancelled due to rain
- Dutch Open

The 1989 Dutch Open was a men's Grand Prix tennis tournament staged at 't Melkhuisje in Hilversum, Netherlands and played on outdoor clay courts. It was the 32nd edition of the tournament was held from 24 July to 30 July 1989. Eighth-seeded Karel Nováček won the singles title.

== Finals ==
=== Singles ===
(Czechoslovakia) Karel Nováček defeated (Spain) Emilio Sánchez 6–2, 6–4

- It was Nováček's 1st singles title of the year and the 2nd of his career.

=== Doubles ===
(Spain) Tomás Carbonell / (Uruguay) Diego Pérez vs. (Netherlands) Paul Haarhuis / (Netherlands) Mark Koevermans, final cancelled due to rain
