= 1969 Dutch Open (tennis) =

Dutch tennis tournament

- Date: 28 July – 3 August
- Edition: 12th
- Draw: 32S / 16D
- Prize money: $7,210
- Surface: Clay / Outdoor
- Location: Hilversum, Netherlands
- Venue: 't Melkhuisje

Champions

Men's singles
- (Netherlands) Tom Okker

Women's singles
- (Australia) Kerry Melville

Men's doubles
- (Netherlands) Tom Okker / (United Kingdom) Roger Taylor

Women's doubles
- (Australia) Kerry Melville / (Australia) Karen Krantzcke
- Dutch Open

The 1969 Dutch Open was a combined men's and women's tennis tournament staged in Hilversum, Netherlands. The tournament was played on outdoor clay courts and was held from 28 July to 3 August 1969. It was the 12th edition of the tournament and the second in the Open era of tennis. Tom Okker and Kerry Melville won the singles titles.

== Finals ==
=== Men's singles ===
(Netherlands) Tom Okker defeated (United Kingdom) Roger Taylor 10–8, 7–9, 6–4, 6–4

=== Women's singles ===
(Australia) Kerry Melville defeated (Australia) Karen Krantzcke 6–2, 3–6, 6–3

=== Men's doubles ===
(Netherlands) Tom Okker / (United Kingdom) Roger Taylor defeated (Czechoslovakia) Jan Kodeš / (Czechoslovakia) Jan Kukal 6–3, 6–2, 6–4

=== Women's doubles ===
(Australia) Kerry Melville / (Australia) Karen Krantzcke defeated (South Africa) Pat Walkden / (Australia) Helen Gourlay 1–6, 6–4, 6–3

=== Mixed doubles ===
Final was not played due to thunderstorms.
