= 1988 Dutch Open (tennis) =

- Date: 25–31 July
- Edition: 31st
- Category: Grand Prix
- Draw: 32S / 16D
- Prize money: $150,000
- Surface: Clay / outdoor
- Location: Hilversum, Netherlands
- Venue: 't Melkhuisje

Champions

Singles
- (Spain) Emilio Sánchez

Doubles
- (Spain) Sergio Casal / (Spain) Emilio Sánchez
- Dutch Open

The 1988 Dutch Open was a Grand Prix men's tennis tournament staged at the Melkhuisje in Hilversum, Netherlands. The tournament was played on outdoor clay courts and was held from 25 July until 31 July 1988. It was the 30th edition of the tournament. Second-seeded Emilio Sánchez won the singles title.

== Finals ==
=== Singles ===
(Spain) Emilio Sánchez defeated (Argentina) Guillermo Pérez Roldán 6–3, 6–1, 3–6, 6–3

- It was Sánchez' only singles title of the year and the 8th of his career.

=== Doubles ===
(Spain) Sergio Casal / (Spain) Emilio Sánchez defeated. (Sweden) Magnus Gustafsson / (Argentina) Guillermo Pérez Roldán 7–6, 6–3
