= 1971 Dutch Open (tennis) =

- Date: 26 July – 1 August
- Edition: 14th
- Category: Non–tour event
- Draw: 64S
- Surface: Clay / outdoor
- Location: Hilversum, Netherlands
- Venue: 't Melkhuisje

Champions

Men's singles
- (United Kingdom) Gerald Battrick

Women's singles
- (Australia) Evonne Goolagong

Men's doubles
- (France) Jean-Claude Barclay / (France) Daniel Contet

Women's doubles
- (Netherlands) Betty Stöve / (Sweden) Christina Sandberg

Mixed doubles
- (Netherlands) Betty Stöve / (France) Jean-Claude Barclay
- Dutch Open

The 1971 Dutch Open was a combined men's and women's tennis tournament staged at 't Melkhuisje in Hilversum, Netherlands. It was a non–tour event, i.e. not part of one of the main tennis circuits, the Grand Prix or World Championship Tennis circuit. The tournament was played on outdoor clay courts and was held from 26 July through 1 August 1971. It was the 14th edition of the tournament and was part of the 1971 Grand Prix circuit. Gerald Battrick and Evonne Goolagong won the singles titles.

== Finals ==
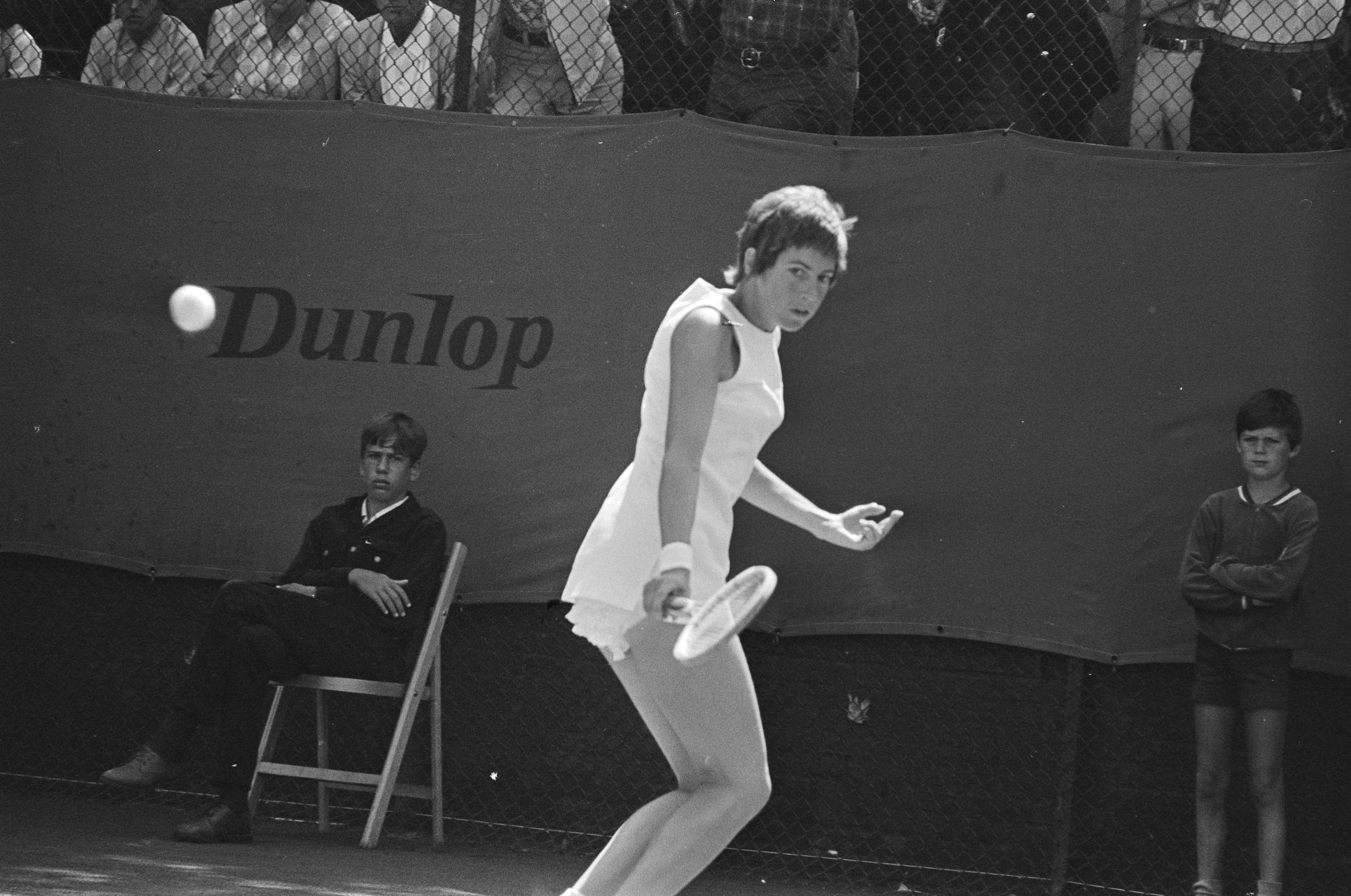
Christina Sandberg at the 1971 Dutch Open

=== Men's singles ===
(United Kingdom) Gerald Battrick defeated (Australia) Ross Case 6–3, 6–4, 9–7

=== Women's singles ===
(Australia) Evonne Goolagong defeated (Sweden) Christina Sandberg 8–6, 6–3

=== Men's doubles ===
(France) Jean-Claude Barclay / (France) Daniel Contet defeated (Australia) John Cooper / (Australia) Colin Dibley 7–5, 3–6, 7–5, 4–6, 6–2

=== Women's doubles ===
(Netherlands) Betty Stöve / (Sweden) Christina Sandberg defeated (West Germany) Katja Ebbinghaus / (Netherlands) Trudy Walhof 6–1, 6–2

=== Mixed doubles ===
(Netherlands) Betty Stöve / (France) Jean-Claude Barclay defeated (Sweden) Christina Sandberg / (France) Patrice Dominguez 8–6, 6–3
