= Eduardo Masso =

Belgian tennis player

- Country (sports): Belgium
- Residence: Brussels, Belgium
- Born: 11 January 1964 (age 62) Bell Ville, Argentina
- Height: 1.78 m (5 ft 10 in)
- Turned pro: 1984
- Retired: 1992
- Plays: Left-handed (one-handed backhand)
- Prize money: $397,593

Singles
- Career record: 46–73
- Career titles: 0
- Highest ranking: No. 56 (22 July 1991)

Grand Slam singles results
- Australian Open: 2R (1991)
- French Open: 2R (1988)
- Wimbledon: 2R (1992)
- US Open: 1R (1988)

Doubles
- Career record: 22–40
- Career titles: 0
- Highest ranking: No. 134 (26 November 1990)

Eduardo Masso (born 11 January 1964) is a former tennis professional from Belgium.

Born in Argentina, the left-hander reached his highest ATP singles ranking of World No. 56 in July 1991. Masso's greatest result in singles was reaching the final of Hilversum in 1990 as a qualifier, beating celebrated claycourters Juan Aguilera, Sergi Bruguera and Emilio Sanchez en route. He lost this final being a qualifier and losing against a lucky loser: Francisco Clavet

Masso became a naturalised citizen of Belgium after marrying Sabrina Merckx, the daughter of Eddy Merckx and taking up residence in Brussels They are the parents of Luca Masso, who was part of the Argentinian hockey team that took the gold medal in the 2016 Olympics in the finals against Belgium.

== Career finals ==
Legend
Grand Slam
Tennis Masters Cup
ATP Masters Series
ATP Tour

=== Singles (1 runner-up) ===
Result	No.	Date	Tournament	Surface	Opponent	Score
Loss	1.	Jul 1990	Hilversum, Netherlands	Clay	(Spain) Francisco Clavet	6–3, 4–6, 2–6, 0–6
