= Francisco Clavet =

Spanish tennis player (born 1968)

- Full name: Francisco Javier Clavet
- Country (sports): Spain
- Residence: Aranjuez, Spain
- Born: 24 October 1968 (age 57) Madrid, Spain
- Height: 1.83 m (6 ft 0 in)
- Turned pro: 1988
- Retired: 2003
- Plays: Left-handed (two-handed backhand)
- Prize money: $4,278,632

Singles
- Career record: 388–340
- Career titles: 8
- Highest ranking: No. 18 (13 July 1992)

Grand Slam singles results
- Australian Open: 3R (1996, 1998, 2000, 2002)
- French Open: 4R (1991, 1996, 1998)
- Wimbledon: 4R (1998)
- US Open: 3R (1991, 1995)

Doubles
- Career record: 53–84
- Career titles: 0
- Highest ranking: No. 89 (1 January 1990)

Team competitions
- Davis Cup: W (2000)

Francisco Javier Clavet González de Castejón (Spanish pronunciation: [fɾanˈθisko xaˈβjeɾ klaˈβet ɣonˈθaleθ ðe kasteˈxon]; (Note: In isolation, González is pronounced [gonˈθaleθ].) born 24 October 1968), known as Pato Clavet (Spanish pronunciation: [ˈpato]), is a former professional tennis player from Spain. He won eight singles titles, reached the semifinals of the 1992 Indian Wells Masters and the 1999 Miami Masters, and achieved a career-high ranking of world No. 18 in July 1992. He reached No. 16 at the Champions Race (now called ATP Race), after winning in Scottsdale in 2001.

During his career, he defeated some contemporary, future and past number-one-ranked players, including John McEnroe, Mats Wilander, Andre Agassi, Lleyton Hewitt, and Roger Federer. In his only meeting with Federer, at the 2000 Cincinnati Masters, Clavet won and told Swiss newspaper Blick his defeat of Federer was one of his most important wins as he considers Federer "the greatest tennis player of all time".

Clavet was coached by his brother, José Clavet, until 1999. From 2001 until his retirement in 2003, he was coached by Uruguayan Bebe Pérez.

== 1988–99: Debut on the professional tour, early career, middle career ==
Clavet turned pro in 1988 and won his first ATP singles title two years later at the Dutch Open in Hilversum. He won five consecutive matches to capture the title. He is one of the few people to accomplish this since 1978. (Leonardo Mayer was the last player to win five matches in a row, doing so at the 2017 German Open in Hamburg.)

In 1991, he was among the top 30 players, and reached the semifinals in five different tournaments.

Despite not winning a tournament, his best year was 1992, and resulted in his best ranking (No. 18). That year he reached the finals in Gstaad and San Marino, the semifinals in Philadelphia, Indian Wells, in Madrid, in Palermo and Athens, and the quarterfinals in Indianapolis, and in Schenectady. In 1993, his best result saw him reach the semifinals in Genoa. He lost to the eventual champion Thomas Muster. He reached the quarterfinals three times in clay-court tournaments.

He played two finals, losing to Alberto Berasategui in 1994. In addition, he reached two semifinals in Athens and Buenos Aires, losing, again to the eventual winners (Àlex Corretja and Alberto Berasategui). He also reached the quarterfinals in four clay-court tournaments.

In 1995, he won the tournament of Sicilia (now played in the city of Palermo) and reached the semifinals in Mexico City, Porto, Umag and Montevideo.

He won the Amsterdam Open in 1996 (defeating Younes El Aynaoui), and reached the semifinals in Mexico and Bologna. He also reached the quarterfinals in: Antwerp, Estoril, St. Pölten, Gstaad, Stuttgart, Bucharest, and Palermo. He had won in Sicilia the year before, but this time lost to Karim Alami.

In 1997, he won two consecutive titles, Acapulco and Bogotá, which gave him a record of 19 wins/four losses from the US Open. He also played the final in Estoril losing to countryman Àlex Corretja. The same year he also reached two semifinals, Tashkent and Bucharest, but lost to Tim Henman and Richard Fromberg, respectively. The Tashkent tournament was played on a carpet surface, and his was the best performance of a Spanish male tennis player on this surface in 1997.

He won two other titles in 1998: Santiago and Bucharest. He managed to reach two other semifinals: Mexico and Kitzbühel. He also performed well in Grand Slams tournaments. He repeated his best achievements at Roland Garros and the Australian Open (fourth and third round, respectively) and reached the fourth round at Wimbledon, delivering a surprise upset by defeating the second-seeded, and world No. 2, Marcelo Ríos, in a five-set match in the first round. Rios underestimated Clavet and lamented the lost match by attacking the grass surface

In 1999, after the success of the previous past two years and winning at least one tournament during the past four years, he ended the year without winning a title. He reached the semifinals of the Miami Masters and Barcelona Open, which were his best performances. He also reached the quarterfinals in Dubai (losing to eventual finalist Nicolas Kiefer; he defeated hard-court specialists including Wayne Ferreira and Greg Rusedski), at St. Pölten, Gstaad, Umag and the Mallorca Open. Clavet began improving his hard-court game and was called to play for the Davis Cup for the first time, facing a difficult qualifying round but playing well.

He came close to defeating his nemesis Pete Sampras, who was top-ranked for most of Clavet's career, in the 1999 Paris Open. Sampras finished the match injured and was forced to withdraw from the tournament after winning at the tie-break of the final set in a very tough match.

He was considered (along with Sergi Bruguera) the best male Spanish player on hard and indoor courts in the early 1990s, and also the best male Spanish player on grass courts during the 1990s and the early years of the 2000s. He was the best male Spanish player at Wimbledon during the 90s, reaching the fourth round in 1998, with victories over second-seeded Marcelo Ríos in the first round in five sets and Thomas Johansson in the third round. He also reached the third round in Wimbledon 1999 and played an excellent match in 2001 against Pete Sampras, losing the second set due to a controversial point that Clavet saw out, but was awarded to Sampras.

== 2000–03: Twilight years and retirement ==
Of his eight ATP singles titles, seven were won on clay. But he showed, especially in his last years of career, that he could also play well on hard surface and grass courts.

In 2000, Clavet's best result was reaching the final of the Estoril Open, which he lost to Carlos Moyá. He also reached the semifinal in Kitzbühel and the quarterfinals at the Hamburg Masters (Tennis Master Series) and at Rosmalen.

2001 was the year with his best performances on hard courts. He reached the final at the Auckland Open losing to Dominik Hrbatý. He won in Scottsdale, defeating Agassi in the first round, Lleyton Hewitt in the semifinals and Magnus Norman in the final (ranked No. 4, 6 and 5 respectively by this date in the ATP Tour). After winning in Scottsdale he declared: "I think this is the happiest day of my life as a tennis player. I am living a dream. I am a clay court player, and I have won all I have could in that surface, so winning a tournament at hard court aged 32, and winning over three top ten during this, is something very special. I will save this moment in my heart for all the rest of my life". That year, on hard courts, he also reached the semifinal in Shanghai and the quarterfinals in Japan losing both to the eventual champions. Clavet holds the record for the fastest ever ATP Tour victory when he beat Shan Jiang 6–0, 6–0 in only 25 minutes at the Shanghai Open.

In 2002, Clavet's career began to decline. Even though he had a good start to the year reaching third round at the Australian Open defeating No. 5 seed Sébastien Grosjean, he only reached the quarterfinals at three minor tournaments for his best results of this year.

At age 34, Clavet decided to retire at the end of the 2003 season. He lost all of his matches that year. But at Key Biscayne, entering at the tournament as a qualifier ranked 178th, and the oldest player in the draw, he defeated then-current number-one-ranked Lleyton Hewitt, who suffered from food poisoning the previous day. Clavet established the record for the lowest-ranked man to defeat a number-one-ranked player until Thanasi Kokkinakis defeated Roger Federer in 2018. He lost the next round to Lee Hyung-taik. Finally, his official retirement came at the second round of the Spanish Challenger tournament of Open Castilla y León, one of his favourite tournaments due to his relationship with the organization.

Following his retirement, he worked as a coach with Thomaz Bellucci, Feliciano López, Alejandro Falla and Santiago Giraldo. He occasionally works as a commentator for Spanish television, including the broadcast of the 10th French Open won by Rafael Nadal. He continues playing tennis at senior levels. December 2019, he won the singles title at USTA National 40 Hard Court Championships defeating American Samuel Schroerlucke.

== Davis Cup ==
His Davis Cup debut came in 1999 in New Zealand in a playoff that Spain had to win to stay in the World Group. That year, due to several injuries and some refuses, the top Spanish players did not participate in the Davis Cup and Manolo Santana called Félix Mantilla and Clavet to play the singles matches on a difficult surface than Spanish tennis: hard indoor. Clavet won easily over Brett Steven in three sets, showing a powerful and accurate style, and had favourable results in the playoff (4–0) defeating Mark Nielsen in straight sets, losing only four games.

In 2000, Clavet played for the Spanish Davis Cup Team in the first round of the Davis Cup against Italy in Murcia. He gave Spain a 4–1 definitive result with a victory over Vincenzo Santopadre. Eventually, Spain was the winner of the championship. This was Clavet's last Davis Cup match, finishing his contribution with a 3–0 career Davis Cup record and two ties.

== National competitions ==
In national competitions, Clavet played in singles finals from 1994 to 1997 at the National Tennis Masters competition in Spain (national version of ATP World Tour Finals), losing all of them. In 1999, in Madrid, the region where he was born, he defeated Àlex Corretja, the previous champion, recovering from a 1–6 loss in the first set, to claim the trophy. He also won the National Championship of Spain twice—1995: Juan Antonio Marín and 1999: Juan Carlos Ferrero, and reached the final in 2000 losing to Àlex Corretja.

== Playing style ==
Clavet used to play in the back of the court behind the baseline, but he often used his drive to move his opponent out wide with balls that took the opponent off the court. He used to finish the point by approaching the net and volleying or smashing. His best shot was his powerful, open stance forehand drive. His backhand was also quite good and consistent, but not as powerful as his drive. He was known as an exceptional fighter on the court. Former tennis player and commentator for Spanish public television Andrés Gimeno said about him: "Clavet never gives up, he reaches all the balls, you must beat him each point".

It is said, but this is not official, that Clavet was the inventor of the two-handed backhand while jumping in the air. While for some, this is considered only an aesthetic hit with no relevance, other people opine that, with the hip rotation, it can help the player hit with a wider angle, and therefore, it could be useful while attacking. This has been used by players like Sébastien Grosjean, Marcelo Ríos and Thomaz Bellucci.

Clavet is a reference in tennis in the capital of Spain, Madrid. Spanish player Daniel Muñoz de la Nava sees in Clavet a reference to keep fighting in the ATP World tour: "Francisco Clavet has always been my idol. I practiced with him a lot when I was 20–23 and he was at the end of his career. He inspired me because he was always focused, professional and working hard. I have to work hard at every point and he really taught me a lot about how to be a professional player."

== Career finals ==
=== Singles: 15 (8 titles / 7 runner-ups) ===
Legend
Grand Slam (0–0)
Tennis Masters Cup (0–0)
ATP Masters Series (0–0)
ATP Tour (8–7)

Result	W/L	Date	Tournament	Surface	Opponent	Score
Win	1–0	Jul 1990	Hilversum, Netherlands	Clay	(Argentina) Eduardo Masso	3–6, 6–4, 6–2, 6–0
Loss	1–1	Jul 1992	Gstaad, Switzerland	Clay	(Spain) Sergi Bruguera	6–1, 6–4
Loss	1–2	Jul 1992	Saint-Marin, San Marino	Clay	(Czech Republic) Karel Nováček	7–5, 6–2
Loss	1–3	Oct 1994	Santiago, Chile	Clay	(Spain) Alberto Berasategui	6–3, 6–4
Loss	1–4	Oct 1994	Montevideo, Uruguay	Clay	(Spain) Alberto Berasategui	6–4, 6–0
Win	2–4	Sep 1995	Palermo, Italy	Clay	(Spain) Jordi Burillo	6–7^{(3–7)}, 6–3, 7–6^{(7–1)}
Win	3–4	Jul 1996	Amsterdam, Netherlands	Clay	(Morocco) Younes El Aynaoui	7–5, 6–1, 6–1
Loss	3–5	Apr 1997	Estoril, Portugal	Clay	(Spain) Àlex Corretja	6–3, 7–5
Win	4–5	Oct 1997	Acapulco, Mexico	Clay	(Spain) Juan Albert Viloca	6–4, 7–6^{(9–7)}
Win	5–5	Oct 1997	Bogotá, Colombia	Clay	(Ecuador) Nicolás Lapentti	6–3, 6–3
Win	6–5	Sep 1998	Bucharest, Romania	Clay	(France) Arnaud Di Pasquale	6–4, 2–6, 7–5
Win	7–5	Nov 1998	Santiago, Chile	Clay	(Morocco) Younes El Aynaoui	6–2, 6–4
Loss	7–6	Apr 2000	Estoril, Portugal	Clay	(Spain) Carlos Moyá	6–3, 6–2
Loss	7–7	Jan 2001	Auckland, New Zealand	Hard	(Slovakia) Dominik Hrbatý	6–4, 2–6, 6–3
Win	8–7	Mar 2001	Scottsdale, United States	Hard	(Sweden) Magnus Norman	6–4, 6–2

=== Records ===
- These records were attained in the Open Era of tennis.

Tournament	Year	Record accomplished	Player tied
Dutch Open	1990	Winning an ATP tournament as lucky loser	Heinz Günthardt; Bill Scanlon; Christian Miniussi; Sergiy Stakhovsky; Rajeev Ram; Leonardo Mayer; Andrey Rublev; Marco Cecchinato; Kwon Soon-woo

== Singles performance timeline ==
Key
W	F	SF	QF	#R	RR	Q#	DNQ	A	NH

(W) winner; (F) finalist; (SF) semifinalist; (QF) quarterfinalist; (#R) rounds 4, 3, 2, 1; (RR) round-robin stage; (Q#) qualification round; (DNQ) did not qualify; (A) absent; (NH) not held; (SR) strike rate (events won / competed); (W–L) win–loss record.

Tournament	1990	1991	1992	1993	1994	1995	1996	1997	1998	1999	2000	2001	2002	2003	Career SR	Career W-L
Grand Slam tournaments
Australian Open	Q2	2R	2R	A	A	A	3R	A	3R	1R	3R	2R	3R	1R	0 / 9	11–9
French Open	1R	4R	1R	2R	2R	3R	4R	2R	4R	2R	2R	1R	1R	Q3	0 / 13	16–13
Wimbledon	A	1R	1R	A	A	A	1R	2R	4R	3R	2R	1R	1R	A	0 / 9	7–9
US Open	A	3R	1R	1R	2R	3R	1R	1R	2R	1R	1R	1R	1R	A	0 / 12	6–12
Grand Slam win–loss	0 / 1	6 / 4	1 / 4	1 / 2	2 / 2	4 / 2	5 / 4	2 / 3	8 / 4	3 / 4	4 / 4	1 / 4	2 / 4	0 / 1	0 / 43	40 / 43
ATP Masters Series
Indian Wells	A	3R	SF	2R	A	2R	1R	3R	2R	2R	2R	2R	1R	A	0 / 13	
Miami	A	2R	3R	2R	A	2R	1R	3R	3R	SF	1R	3R	2R	3R	0 / 12	
Monte Carlo	A	A	1R	2R	Q1	A	1R	2R	2R	3R	1R	1R	1R	A	0 / 9	
Hamburg	A	3R	3R	3R	A	2R	1R	2R	3R	3R	QF	1R	A	A	0 / 10	
Rome	A	A	2R	2R	A	1R	2R	1R	1R	2R	3R	2R	1R	A	0 / 10	
Canada	A	A	A	A	A	A	2R	A	A	A	A	2R	A	A	0 / 2	
Cincinnati	A	A	A	A	A	A	A	A	A	A	2R	1R	A	A	0 / 2	
Madrid^{1}	A	A	2R	A	A	A	1R	A	A	1R	1R	1R	1R	A	0 / 6	
Paris	A	A	1R	A	A	A	1R	A	A	2R	A	1R	A	A	0 / 4	
Year-end ranking	90	30	22	100	38	49	34	33	30	38	49	51	113	358	N/A	

^{1}This event was held in Stockholm through 1994, Essen in 1995, and Stuttgart from 1996 through 2001.
