= Dutch Open (tennis) =

Tournament information
- Event name: Van Mossel Kia Dutch Open
- Tour: Grand Prix circuit (1972–1989); ATP Tour (1990–2008); ATP Challenger Tour (2019-present)
- Founded: 1957
- Editions: 57
- Location: Hilversum, Netherlands (1957–1994); Amsterdam, Netherlands (1995–2001); Amersfoort, Netherlands (2002–2008, 2019-2024); Bunschoten, Netherlands (2025-)
- Surface: Clay / outdoor
- Website: website

The Dutch Open is a professional tennis tournament currently part of the ATP Challenger Tour since 2019. It is played on outdoor clay courts in Amersfoort (until 2024) and later Bunschoten, Netherlands (since 2025).

Originally known as the International Championships of the Netherlands and then known as the Dutch Open Tennis, it was a Grand Prix circuit and subsequently an ATP Tour event held in three different locations in The Netherlands between 1957 and 2008. No tournament was organized in 1967. From 1957 to 1973 the tournament consisted of both men's and women's events (singles, doubles, mixed doubles) but from 1975 onward only men's singles and doubles events were held.

== History ==
The tournament was a Grand Prix in the 1970s and an ATP Tour event from its inception in 1990. Amsterdam became the event host in 1995 and in 2002 the tournament moved to Amersfoort where it was held until its final edition in 2008.

In 2008 the organizers sold the right of organization to the family of Serbian tennis player Novak Djokovic, and the tournament was moved to Belgrade, where it became known as the Serbia Open.

In 2019, the tournament returned as an ATP Challenger Tour event, known as the Van Mossel Kia Dutch Open, first held in Amersfoort, and since 2025 held in Bunschoten, Netherlands. As a Challenger event, it was the continuation of The Hague Open, which had been held in Scheveningen from 1993-2018.

Balázs Taróczy won six editions and is the record title holder.

== Past finals ==
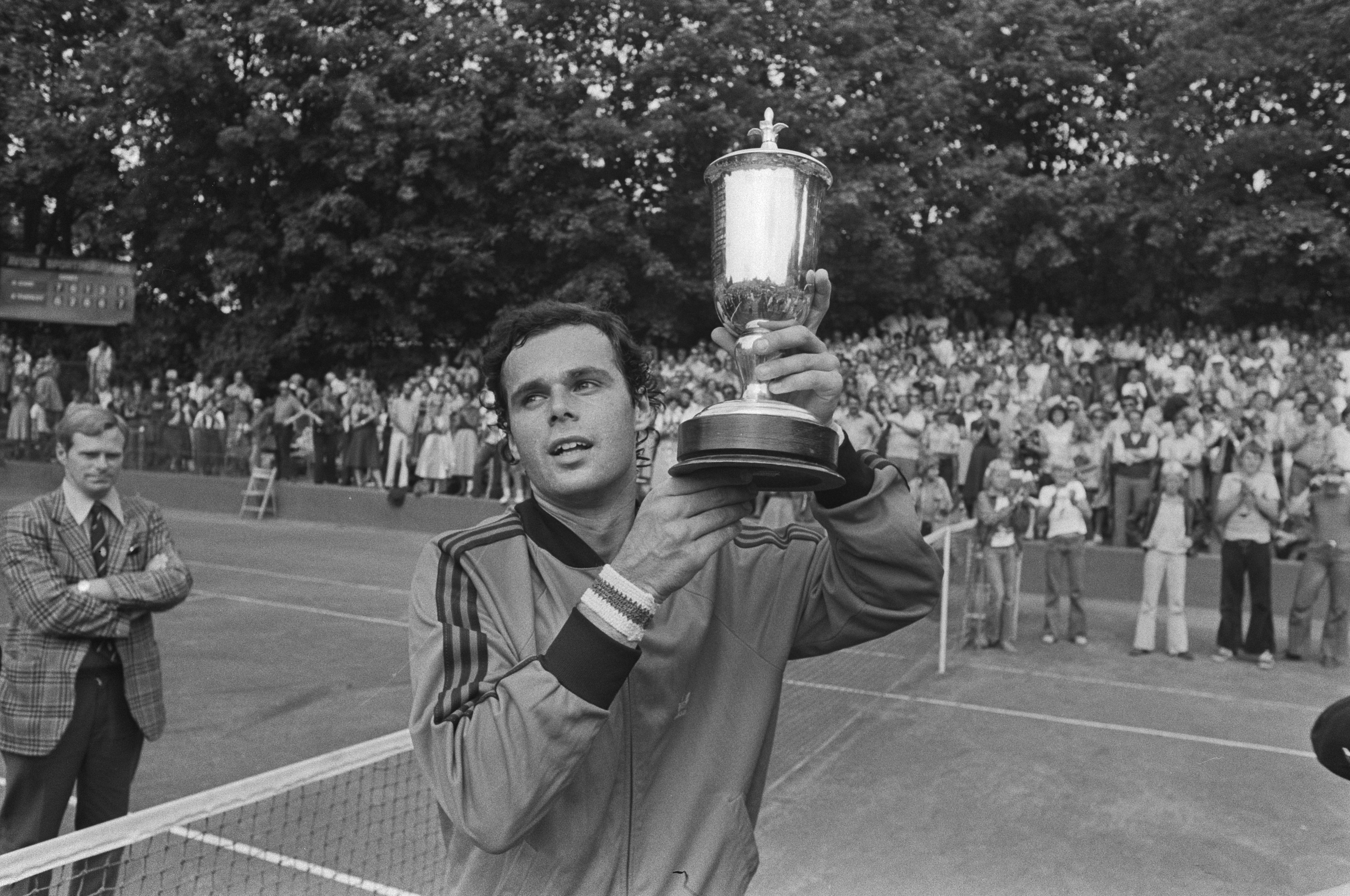
Balázs Taróczy, record winner with six singles titles

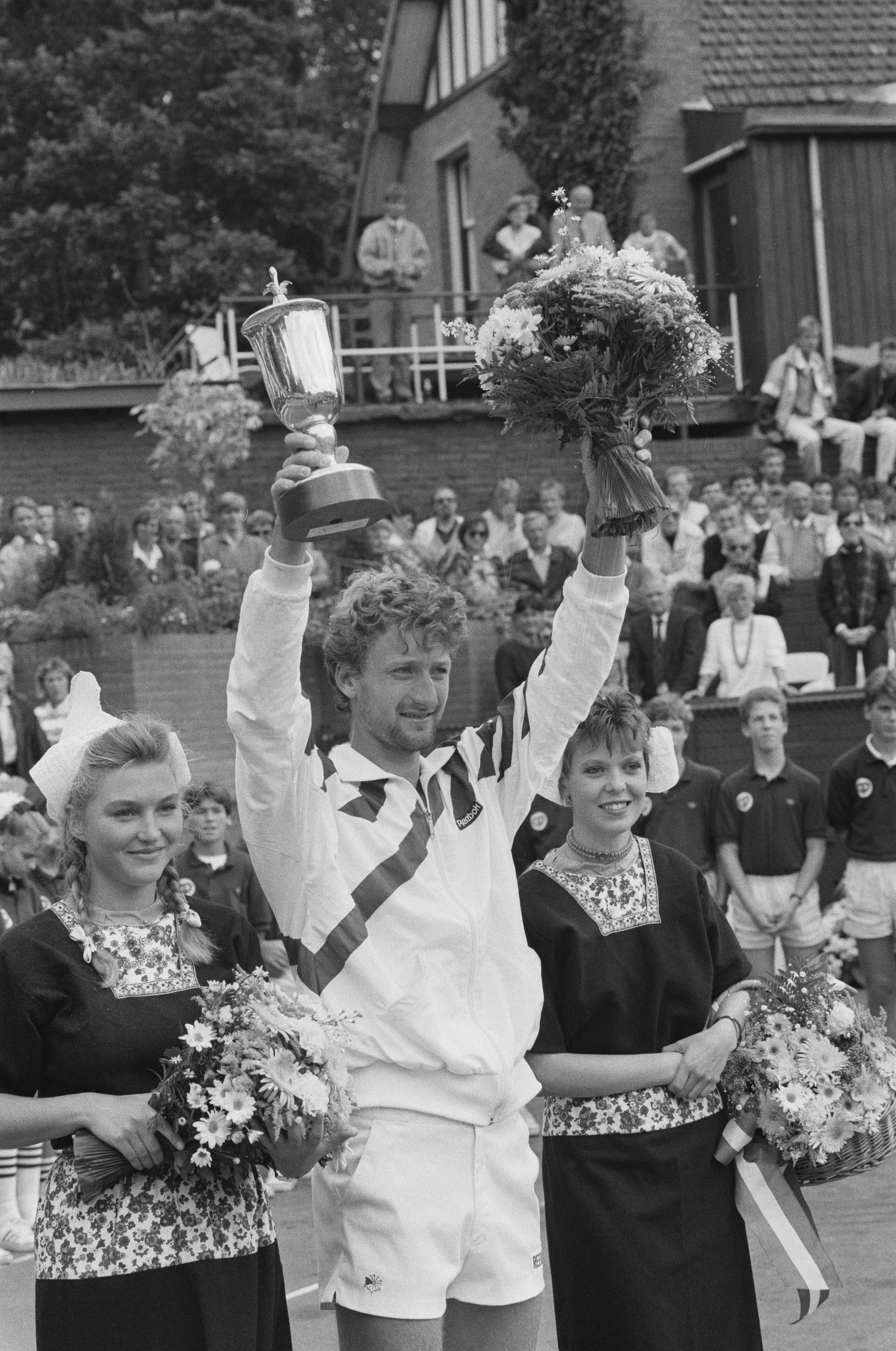
Miloslav Mecir, after winning the 1987 tournament

=== Men's singles ===
Location	Year	Champions	Runners-up	Score
Hilversum
Hilversum	1957	Ladislav Legenstein (Note: Legenstein and Petrović were both stateless when they won their singles titles in 1957 and 1958 respectively.)	(Netherlands) Fred Dehnert	6–1, 6–1
Hilversum	1958	Vladimir Petrović	(Netherlands) Piet van Eijsden	6–4, 6–4
Hilversum	1959	(Belgium) Jacques Brichant	(Austria) Ladislav Legenstein	6–2, 2–6, 6–2
Hilversum	1960	(United Kingdom) Mike Davies	(Socialist Federal Republic of Yugoslavia) Vladimir Petrović	6–2, 4–6, 6–2
Hilversum	1961	(India) Ramanathan Krishnan	(Australia) Martin Mulligan	6–2, 6–3
Hilversum	1962	(Australia) Rod Laver	(India) Ramanathan Krishnan	4–6, 6–3, 6–3, 7–5
Hilversum	1963	(South Africa) Cliff Drysdale	(Australia) Roy Emerson	6–3, 6–4, 6–2
Hilversum	1964	(South Africa) Cliff Drysdale	(Brazil) Thomaz Koch	7–5, 4–6, 6–2, 7–5
Hilversum	1965	(Australia) John Newcombe	(Netherlands) Tom Okker	6–2, 3–6, 6–1, 6–3
Hilversum	1966	(Netherlands) Tom Okker	(South Africa) Bob Hewitt	6–3, 6–3, 2–6, 6–3
Hilversum	1967	Not held		
Hilversum	↓ Open Era ↓			
Hilversum	1968	(South Africa) Bob Maud	(Hungary) István Gulyás	7–9, 7–5, 6–0, 1–6, 13–11
Hilversum	1969	(Netherlands) Tom Okker	(United Kingdom) Roger Taylor	10–8, 7–9, 6–4, 6–4
Hilversum	1970	(Netherlands) Tom Okker	(United Kingdom) Roger Taylor	4–6, 6–0, 6–1, 6–3
Hilversum	1971	(United Kingdom) Gerald Battrick	(Australia) Ross Case	6–3, 6–4, 9–7
Hilversum	1972	(Australia) John Cooper	(Austria) Hans Kary	6–1, 3–6, 12–10, 3–6, 6–2
Hilversum	1973	(Netherlands) Tom Okker	(Spain) Andrés Gimeno	2–6, 6–4, 6–4, 6–7, 6–3
Hilversum	1974	(Argentina) Guillermo Vilas	(Australia) Barry Phillips-Moore	6–4, 6–2, 1–6, 6–3
Hilversum	1975	(Argentina) Guillermo Vilas	(Socialist Federal Republic of Yugoslavia) Željko Franulović	6–4, 6–7, 6–2, 6–3
Hilversum	1976	(Hungary) Balázs Taróczy	(Argentina) Ricardo Cano	6–4, 6–0, 6–1
Hilversum	1977	(France) Patrick Proisy	(Argentina) Lito Álvarez	6–0, 6–2, 6–0
Hilversum	1978	(Hungary) Balázs Taróczy	(Netherlands) Tom Okker	2–6, 6–1, 6–2, 6–4
Hilversum	1979	(Hungary) Balázs Taróczy	(Czechoslovakia) Tomáš Šmíd	6–2, 6–2, 6–1
Hilversum	1980	(Hungary) Balázs Taróczy	(Zimbabwe) Haroon Ismail	6–3, 6–2, 6–1
Hilversum	1981	(Hungary) Balázs Taróczy	(Switzerland) Heinz Günthardt	6–3, 6–7, 6–4
Hilversum	1982	(Hungary) Balázs Taróczy	(United Kingdom) Buster Mottram	7–6, 6–7, 6–3, 7–6
Hilversum	1983	(Czechoslovakia) Tomáš Šmíd	(Hungary) Balázs Taróczy	6–4, 6–4
Hilversum	1984	(Sweden) Anders Järryd	(Czechoslovakia) Tomáš Šmíd	6–3, 6–3, 2–6, 6–2
Hilversum	1985	(West Germany) Ricki Osterthun	(Sweden) Kent Carlsson	4–6, 4–6, 6–2, 6–4, 6–3
Hilversum	1986	(Austria) Thomas Muster	(Switzerland) Jakob Hlasek	6–1, 6–3, 6–3
Hilversum	1987	(Czechoslovakia) Miloslav Mečíř	(Argentina) Guillermo Pérez Roldán	6–4, 1–6, 6–3, 6–2
Hilversum	1988	(Spain) Emilio Sánchez	(Argentina) Guillermo Pérez Roldán	6–3, 6–1, 3–6, 6–3
Hilversum	1989	(Czechoslovakia) Karel Nováček	(Spain) Emilio Sánchez	6–2, 6–4
Hilversum	1990	(Spain) Francisco Clavet	(Belgium) Eduardo Masso	3–6, 6–4, 6–2, 6–0
Hilversum	1991	(Sweden) Magnus Gustafsson	(Spain) Jordi Arrese	5–7, 7–6^{(7-2)}, 2–6, 6–1, 6–0
Hilversum	1992	(Czechoslovakia) Karel Nováček	(Spain) Jordi Arrese	6–2, 6–3, 2–6, 7–5
Hilversum	1993	(Spain) Carlos Costa	(Sweden) Magnus Gustafsson	6–1, 6–2, 6–3
Hilversum	1994	(Czech Republic) Karel Nováček	(Australia) Richard Fromberg	7–5, 6–4, 7–6^{(9-7)}
Amsterdam
Amsterdam	1995	(Chile) Marcelo Ríos	(Netherlands) Jan Siemerink	6–4, 7–5, 6–4
Amsterdam	1996	(Spain) Francisco Clavet	(Morocco) Younes El Aynaoui	7–5, 6–1, 6–1
Amsterdam	1997	(Czech Republic) Ctislav Doseděl	(Spain) Carlos Moyà	7–6^{(7–4)}, 7–6^{(7–5)}, 6–7^{(4–7)}, 6–2
Amsterdam	1998	(Sweden) Magnus Norman	(Australia) Richard Fromberg	6–3, 6–3, 2–6, 6-4
Amsterdam	1999	(Morocco) Younes El Aynaoui	(Argentina) Mariano Zabaleta	6–0, 6–3
Amsterdam	2000	(Sweden) Magnus Gustafsson	(Netherlands) Raemon Sluiter	6–7^{(4-7)}, 6–3, 7–6^{(7-5)}, 6–1
Amsterdam	2001	(Spain) Àlex Corretja	(Morocco) Younes El Aynaoui	6–3, 5–7, 7–6^{(7-0)}, 3–6, 6–4
Amersfoort	2002	(Argentina) Juan Ignacio Chela	(Spain) Albert Costa	6–1, 7–6^{(7–)}
Amersfoort	2003	(Chile) Nicolás Massú	(Netherlands) Raemon Sluiter	6–4, 7–6^{(7-3)}, 6–2
Amersfoort	2004	(Netherlands) Martin Verkerk	(Chile) Fernando González	7–6^{(7–5)}, 4–6, 6–4
Amersfoort	2005	(Chile) Fernando González	(Argentina) Agustín Calleri	7–5 6–3
Amersfoort	2006	(Serbia) Novak Djokovic	(Chile) Nicolás Massú	7–6^{(7–5)}, 6–4
Amersfoort	2007	(Belgium) Steve Darcis	(Austria) Werner Eschauer	6–1, 7–6^{(7–1)}
Amersfoort	2008	(Spain) Albert Montañés	(Belgium) Steve Darcis	1–6, 7–5, 6–3

=== Women's singles ===
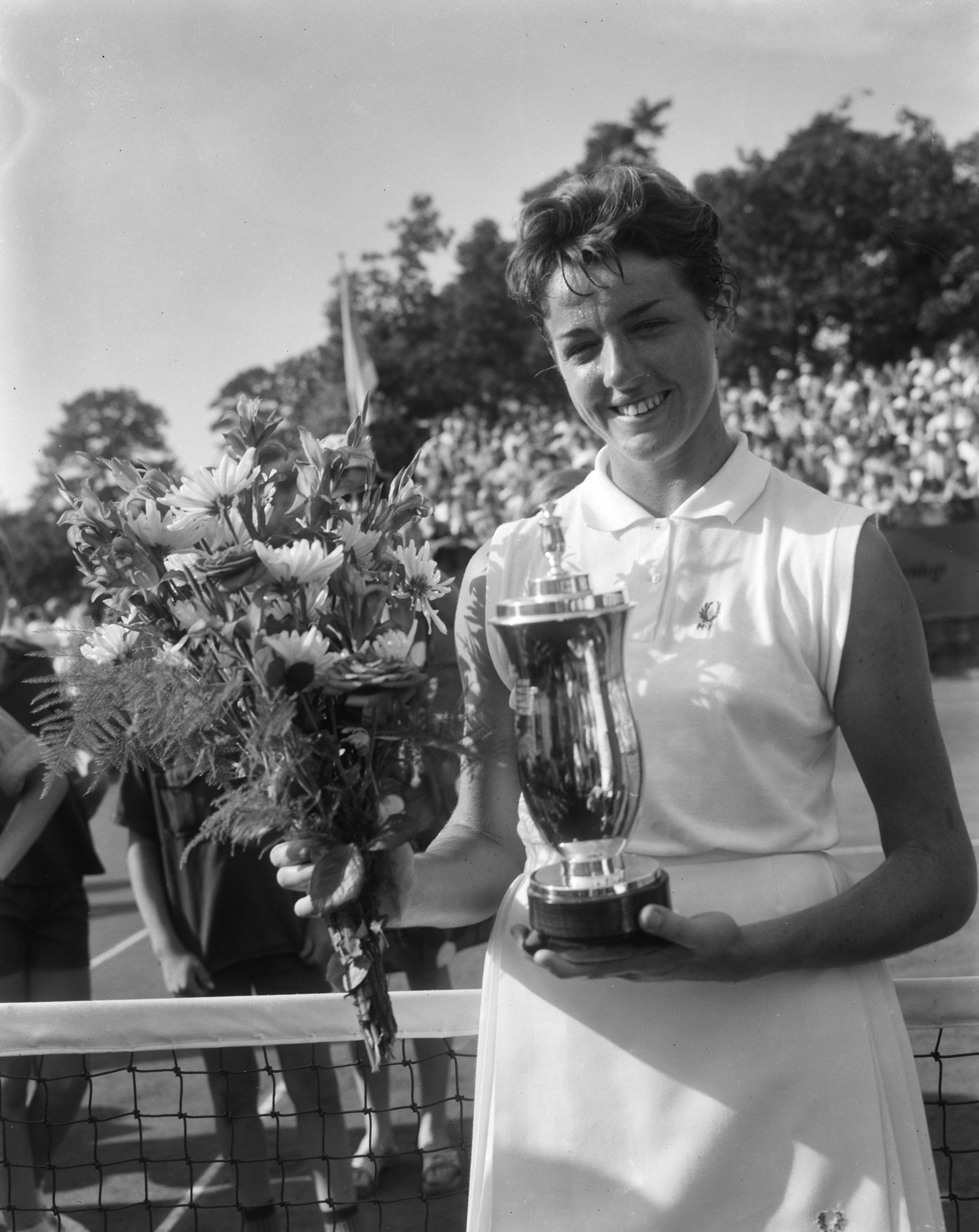
Margaret Smith, after winning the 1964 tournament

Location	Year	Champions	Runners-up	Score
Hilversum	1957	(France) Beatrice de Chambure	R. Topel	6–3, 4–6, 7–5
Hilversum	1958	(Netherlands) Jettie Wienese	(Netherlands) Zus Peters	6–4, 6–2
Hilversum	1959	(Australia) Norma Marsh	(Netherlands) Zus Peters	6–4, 6–1
Hilversum	1960	(South Africa) Bernice Vukovic-Carr	(South Africa) Renée Schuurman	6–0, 6–1
Hilversum	1961	(Australia) Jan Lehane	(Belgium) Christiane Mercelis	6–4, 6–0
Hilversum	1962	(Brazil) Maria Bueno	(South Africa) Sandra Price	6–1, 4–6, 6–2
Hilversum	1963	(Australia) Lesley Turner	(South Africa) Renée Schuurman	6–2, 6–1
Hilversum	1964	(Australia) Margaret Smith	(Brazil) Maria Bueno	6–0, 1–6, 6–3
Hilversum	1965	(France) Françoise Dürr	(West Germany) Edda Buding	9–11, 6–4, 6–4
Hilversum	1966	(South Africa) Annette Van Zyl	(Netherlands) Trudy Groenman	6–3, 6–1
Hilversum	1967	Not held		
Hilversum	1968	(Australia) Margaret Court	(Australia) Judy Tegart	8–6, 6–0
Hilversum	1969	(Australia) Kerry Melville	(Australia) Karen Krantzcke	6–2, 3–6, 6–3
Hilversum	1970	(Australia) Margaret Court	(Australia) Kerry Melville	6–1, 6–1
Hilversum	1971	(Australia) Evonne Goolagong	(Sweden) Christina Sandberg	8–6, 6–3
Hilversum	1972	(Netherlands) Betty Stöve	(Netherlands) Marijke Schaar	7–5, 6–3
Hilversum	1973	(Netherlands) Betty Stöve	(West Germany) Helga Masthoff	7–5, 6–2

=== Men's Challenger singles ===
Year	Champions	Runners-up	Score
2019	(Germany) Mats Moraing	(Belgium) Kimmer Coppejans	6–2, 3–6, 6–3
2020	Not held		
2021	(Netherlands) Tallon Griekspoor	(Netherlands) Botic van de Zandschulp	6–1, 3–6, 6–1
2022	(Netherlands) Tallon Griekspoor	(Spain) Roberto Carballés Baena	6–1, 6–2
2023	(Germany) Maximilian Marterer	(France) Titouan Droguet	6–4, 6–2
2024	(Chile) Tomás Barrios Vera	Alexey Zakharov	6–2, 6–1
2025	(United Kingdom) Jan Choinski	(Belgium) Kimmer Coppejans	6–4, 3–6, 6–3
2026	(Netherlands) Guy den Ouden	(Germany) Tom Gentzsch	6–4, 4–6, 6–0

=== Men's Challenger doubles ===
Year	Champions	Runners-up	Score
2019	(Finland) Harri Heliövaara (Finland) Emil Ruusuvuori	(Netherlands) Jesper de Jong (Netherlands) Ryan Nijboer	6–3, 6–4
2020	Not held		
2021	(Switzerland) Luca Castelnuovo (France) Manuel Guinard	(Peru) Sergio Galdós (Portugal) Gonçalo Oliveira	0–6, 6–4, [11–9]
2022	(Netherlands) Robin Haase (Netherlands) Sem Verbeek	(Colombia) Nicolás Barrientos (Mexico) Miguel Ángel Reyes-Varela	6–4, 3–6, [10–7]
2023	(France) Manuel Guinard (France) Grégoire Jacq	(Netherlands) Mats Hermans (Netherlands) Sander Jong	6–4, 6–4
2024	(Brazil) Marcelo Demoliner (Argentina) Guillermo Durán	(United Kingdom) Jay Clarke (United Kingdom) David Stevenson	7–6^{(7–2)}, 6–4
2025	(Belgium) Michael Geerts (Germany) Tim Rühl	(Netherlands) Mats Hermans (Netherlands) Mick Veldheer	7–5, 7–6^{(7–4)}
2026	(Czech Republic) Andrew Paulson (Belgium) Joran Vliegen	(Romania) Victor Vlad Cornea (Israel) Daniel Cukierman	7–6^{(7–5)}, 6–2

== See also ==
- Category:National and multi-national tennis tournaments
