= 1995 WTA Tier I Series =

Women's professional tennis tour

Details
- Duration: January 30 – November 12
- Edition: 6th
- Tournaments: 8

Achievements (singles)
- Most titles: (Germany) Steffi Graf (Spain) Conchita Martínez (2)
- Most finals: (Japan) Kimiko Date (Germany) Steffi Graf (Bulgaria) Magdalena Maleeva (Spain) Conchita Martínez (Spain) Arantxa Sánchez Vicario (2)

The WTA Tier I events are part of the elite tour for professional women's tennis organised by the WTA called the WTA Tour.

== Tournaments ==
Tournament	Country	Location	Surface	Date	Prize money
Toray Pan Pacific Open	Japan	Tokyo	Carpet (i)	Jan 30 – Feb 5	$806,250
Lipton Championships	United States	Key Biscayne	Hard	Mar 13 – 26	$1,550,000
Family Circle Cup	United States	Hilton Head Island	Clay	Mar 27 – Apr 2	$806,250
Italian Open	Italy	Rome	Clay	May 8 – 14	$806,250
WTA German Open	Germany	Berlin	Clay	May 15 – 21	$806,250
Canadian Open	Canada	Toronto	Hard	Aug 14 – 20	$806,250
European Indoors	Switzerland	Zürich	Carpet (i)	Oct 2 – 8	$806,250
Advanta Championships of Philadelphia	United States	Philadelphia	Carpet (i)	Nov 6 – 12	$806,250

== Results ==
* First-time champion

Tournament	Singles champions	Runners-up	Score	Doubles champions	Runners-up	Score
Tokyo Singles – Doubles	(Japan) Kimiko Date*	(United States) Lindsay Davenport	6–1, 6–2	(United States) Gigi Fernández (Belarus) Natalia Zvereva	(United States) Lindsay Davenport (Australia) Rennae Stubbs	6–0, 6–3
Miami Singles – Doubles	(Germany) Steffi Graf	(Japan) Kimiko Date	6–1, 6–4	(Czech Republic) Jana Novotná (Spain) Arantxa Sánchez Vicario	(United States) Gigi Fernández (Belarus) Natalia Zvereva	7–5, 2–6, 6–3
Hilton Head Singles – Doubles	(Spain) Conchita Martínez	(Bulgaria) Magdalena Maleeva	6–1, 6–1	(United States) Nicole Arendt*	(United States) Gigi Fernández (Belarus) Natalia Zvereva	0–6, 6–3, 6–4
Hilton Head Singles – Doubles	(Spain) Conchita Martínez	(Bulgaria) Magdalena Maleeva	6–1, 6–1	(Netherlands) Manon Bollegraf	(United States) Gigi Fernández (Belarus) Natalia Zvereva	0–6, 6–3, 6–4
Rome Singles – Doubles	(Spain) Conchita Martínez	(Spain) Arantxa Sánchez Vicario	6–3, 6–1	(United States) Gigi Fernández (Belarus) Natalia Zvereva	(Spain) Conchita Martínez (Argentina) Patricia Tarabini	3–6, 7–6, 6–4
Berlin Singles – Doubles	(Spain) Arantxa Sánchez Vicario	(Bulgaria) Magdalena Maleeva	6–4, 6–1	(South Africa) Amanda Coetzer* (Argentina) Inés Gorrochategui*	(Latvia) Larisa Neiland (Argentina) Gabriela Sabatini	4–6, 7–6, 6–2
Toronto Singles – Doubles	(United States) Monica Seles	(South Africa) Amanda Coetzer	6–0, 6–1	(Argentina) Gabriela Sabatini	(Switzerland) Martina Hingis (Croatia) Iva Majoli	4–6, 6–0, 6–3
Toronto Singles – Doubles	(United States) Monica Seles	(South Africa) Amanda Coetzer	6–0, 6–1	(Netherlands) Brenda Schultz-McCarthy*	(Switzerland) Martina Hingis (Croatia) Iva Majoli	4–6, 6–0, 6–3
Zürich Singles – Doubles	(Croatia) Iva Majoli*	(France) Mary Pierce	6–4, 6–4	(United States) Nicole Arendt (Netherlands) Manon Bollegraf	(United States) Chanda Rubin (Netherlands) Caroline Vis	6–4, 6–7^{(4–7)}, 6–4
Philadelphia Singles – Doubles	(Germany) Steffi Graf	(United States) Lori McNeil	6–1, 4–6, 6–3	(United States) Lori McNeil (Czech Republic) Helena Suková	(United States) Meredith McGrath (Latvia) Larisa Neiland	4–6, 6–3, 6–4

== See also ==
- WTA Tier I events
- 1995 WTA Tour
- 1995 ATP Championship Series, Single Week
- 1995 ATP Tour
