= 1995 ATP Championship Series, Single Week =

Men's professional tennis tour

Details
- Duration: March 6 – October 30
- Edition: 6th
- Tournaments: 9

Achievements (singles)
- Most titles: (United States) Andre Agassi (3)
- Most finals: (United States) Andre Agassi (United States) Pete Sampras (4)

The 1995 ATP Championship Series, Single Week was a series of tennis tournaments that was part of the 1995 ATP Tour, the elite tour for professional men's tennis organised by the Association of Tennis Professionals. It formed the tier below the Grand Slam tournaments.

== Tournaments ==
Tournament	Country	Location	Venue	Began	Court surface
Indian Wells Masters	United States	Indian Wells		1974	Hard
Miami Masters	United States	Key Biscayne	Tennis Center at Crandon Park	1985	Hard
Monte Carlo Masters	Monaco	Roquebrune-Cap-Martin, France	Monte Carlo Country Club	1897	Clay
Rome Masters	Italy	Rome	Foro Italico	1930	Clay
Hamburg Masters	Hamburg	Hamburg	Am Rothenbaum	1892	Clay
Canada Masters	Canada	Montreal	Stade Uniprix	1881	Hard
Cincinnati Masters	United States	Mason, Ohio	Lindner Family Tennis Center	1899	Hard
Essen Masters	Germany	Essen		1990	Carpet (i)
Paris Masters	France	Paris	Palais Omnisports de Paris-Bercy	1968	Carpet (i)

Note: Although the Monte Carlo Masters is billed as taking place in Monte Carlo, it is held in Roquebrune-Cap-Martin, a commune of France adjacent to Monaco.

== Results ==
* First-time champion

Masters	Singles champions	Runners-up	Score	Doubles champions	Runners-up	Score
Indian Wells Singles – Doubles	(United States) Pete Sampras	(United States) Andre Agassi	7–5, 6–3, 7–5	(United States) Tommy Ho* (New Zealand) Brett Steven*	(South Africa) Gary Muller (South Africa) Piet Norval	7–6, 6–7, 6–4
Miami Singles – Doubles	(United States) Andre Agassi	(United States) Pete Sampras	3–6, 6–2, 7–6^{(7–4)}	(Australia) Todd Woodbridge (Australia) Mark Woodforde	(United States) Jim Grabb (United States) Patrick McEnroe	6–3, 7–6
Monte Carlo Singles – Doubles	(Austria) Thomas Muster	(Germany) Boris Becker	4–6, 5–7, 6–1, 7–6^{(8–6)}, 6–0	(Netherlands) Jacco Eltingh (Netherlands) Paul Haarhuis	(Argentina) Luis Lobo (Spain) Javier Sánchez	6–1, 6–2
Hamburg Singles – Doubles	(Ukraine) Andriy Medvedev	(Croatia) Goran Ivanišević	6–3, 6–2, 6–1	(South Africa) Wayne Ferreira (Russia) Yevgeny Kafelnikov	(Zimbabwe) Byron Black (Russia) Andrei Olhovskiy	7–6, 6–0
Rome Singles – Doubles	(Austria) Thomas Muster	(Spain) Sergi Bruguera	3–6, 7–6^{(7–5)}, 6–2, 6–3	(Czech Republic) Cyril Suk* (Czech Republic) Daniel Vacek*	(Sweden) Jan Apell (Sweden) Jonas Björkman	6–3, 6–4
Montreal Singles – Doubles	(United States) Andre Agassi	(United States) Pete Sampras	3–6, 6–2, 6–3	(Russia) Yevgeny Kafelnikov	(United States) Brian MacPhie (Australia) Sandon Stolle	6–4, 6–4
Montreal Singles – Doubles	(United States) Andre Agassi	(United States) Pete Sampras	3–6, 6–2, 6–3	(Russia) Andrei Olhovskiy*	(United States) Brian MacPhie (Australia) Sandon Stolle	6–4, 6–4
Cincinnati Singles – Doubles	(United States) Andre Agassi	(United States) Michael Chang	7–5, 6–2	(Australia) Todd Woodbridge (Australia) Mark Woodforde	(The Bahamas) Mark Knowles (Canada) Daniel Nestor	6–4, 6–4
Essen Singles – Doubles	(Austria) Thomas Muster	(United States) MaliVai Washington	7–6^{(8–6)}, 2–6, 6–3, 6–4	(Netherlands) Jacco Eltingh (Netherlands) Paul Haarhuis	(Czech Republic) Cyril Suk (Czech Republic) Daniel Vacek	7–5, 6–7, 6–4
Paris Singles – Doubles	(United States) Pete Sampras	(Germany) Boris Becker	7–6^{(7–5)}, 6–4, 6–4	(Canada) Grant Connell (United States) Patrick Galbraith	(United States) Jim Grabb (United States) Todd Martin	6–3, 7–6

== Titles by player ==
=== Singles ===
#	Player	IN	MI	MO	HA	RO	CA	CI	ES	PA	#	Winning span
	(United States) Andre Agassi	-	2	-	-	-	3	1	-	1	7	1990–1995 (6)
	(United States) Pete Sampras	2	2	-	-	1	-	1	-	1	7	1992–1995 (4)
	(United States) Jim Courier	2	1	-	-	2	-	-	-	-	5	1991–1993 (3)
	(United States) Michael Chang	1	1	-	-	-	1	2	-	-	5	1990–1994 (5)
	(Austria) Thomas Muster	-	-	2	-	2	-	-	1	-	5	1990–1995 (6)
	(Germany) Boris Becker	-	-	-	-	-	-	-	3	1	4	1990–1994 (5)
	(Sweden) Stefan Edberg	1	-	-	1	-	-	1	-	1	4	1990–1992 (3)
	(Ukraine) Andrei Medvedev	-	-	1	2	-	-	-	-	-	3	1994–1995 (2)
	(Spain) Sergi Bruguera	-	-	2	-	-	-	-	-	-	2	1991–1993 (3)
	(Russia) Andrei Chesnokov	-	-	1	-	-	1	-	-	-	2	1990–1991 (2)
	(France) Guy Forget	-	-	-	-	-	-	1	-	1	2	1991
	(Croatia) Goran Ivanišević	-	-	-	-	-	-	-	1	1	2	1992–1993 (2)
	(Germany) Michael Stich	-	-	-	1	-	-	-	1	-	2	1993
	(Spain) Juan Aguilera	-	-	-	1	-	-	-	-	-	1	1990
	(Czech Republic) Karel Nováček	-	-	-	1	-	-	-	-	-	1	1991
	(Spain) Emilio Sánchez	-	-	-	-	1	-	-	-	-	1	1991
	(Sweden) Mikael Pernfors	-	-	-	-	-	1	-	-	-	1	1993
#	Player	IN	MI	MO	HA	RO	CA	CI	ES	PA	#	Winning span

== See also ==
- ATP Tour Masters 1000
- 1995 ATP Tour
- 1995 WTA Tier I Series
- 1995 WTA Tour
