= 1995 Italian Open – Men's singles =

Men's singles
- 1995 Italian Open

Final
- Champion: (Austria) Thomas Muster
- Runner-up: (Spain) Sergi Bruguera
- Score: 3–6, 7–6^{(7–5)}, 6–2, 6–3

Details
- Draw: 64 (5WC/8Q/1LL)
- Seeds: 16

Events
| Singles | men | women |
| Doubles | men | women |
| ← 1994 · | Italian Open | · 1996 → |

Thomas Muster defeated Sergi Bruguera in the final, 3–6, 7–6^{(7–5)}, 6–2, 6–3 to win the men's singles tennis title at the 1995 Italian Open.

Pete Sampras was the defending champion, but was defeated in the first round by Fabrice Santoro.

== Seeds ==
1. (United States) Pete Sampras (first round)
2. (United States) Michael Chang (quarterfinals)
3. (Croatia) Goran Ivanišević (semifinals)
4. (South Africa) Wayne Ferreira (semifinals)
5. (Spain) Alberto Berasategui (first round)
6. (Russia) Yevgeny Kafelnikov (first round)
7. (Austria) Thomas Muster (champion)
8. (Spain) Sergi Bruguera (final)
9. (United States) Jim Courier (first round)
10. (United States) Todd Martin (second round)
11. (Switzerland) Marc Rosset (first round)
12. (Sweden) Stefan Edberg (quarterfinals)
13. (Italy) Andrea Gaudenzi (second round)
14. (Ukraine) Andriy Medvedev (third round)
15. (Czech Republic) Karel Nováček (first round)
16. (Sweden) Jonas Björkman (quarterfinals)

== Draw ==
=== Key ===
- Q = Qualifier
- WC = Wild card
- LL = Lucky loser
- Alt = Alternate
- ITF = ITF entry
- PR = Protected ranking
- SR = Special ranking
- SE = Special exempt
- JE = Junior exempt
- JR = Junior Accelerator Programme entrant
- CO = College Accelerator Programme entrant
- NG = Next Gen Accelerator Program entrant
- w/o = Walkover
- r = Retired
- d = Defaulted

=== Finals ===
Semifinals
8 | (Spain) Sergi Bruguera | 6 | 6
3 | (Croatia) Goran Ivanišević | 4 | 4
4 | (South Africa) Wayne Ferreira | 6 | 1 | 3
7 | (Austria) Thomas Muster | 3 | 6 | 6

Final
8 | (Spain) Sergi Bruguera | 6 | 6^{5} | 2 | 3
7 | (Austria) Thomas Muster | 3 | 7^{7} | 6 | 6

=== Top half ===
==== Section 1 ====
First round
1 | (United States) P Sampras | 4 | 3
(France) F Santoro | 6 | 6
(Czech Republic) S Doseděl | 6 | 6
(Australia) J Stoltenberg | 1 | 0
(Spain) F Clavet | 6 | 5 | 2
(Russia) A Chesnokov | 2 | 7 | 6
Q | (Canada) D Nestor | 6 | 1 | 6^{4}
16 | (Sweden) J Björkman | 3 | 6 | 7^{7}
9 | (United States) J Courier | 6 | 3 | 6^{3}
Q | (France) T Guardiola | 3 | 6 | 7^{7}
(United States) J Palmer | 2 | 2
(Australia) R Fromberg | 6 | 6
WC | (Sweden) M Wilander | 3 | 2
(Netherlands) J Eltingh | 6 | 6
(Australia) P Rafter | 4 | 5
8 | (Spain) S Bruguera | 6 | 7

Second round
(France) F Santoro | 7 | 6^{5} | 6
(Czech Republic) S Doseděl | 5 | 7^{7} | 4
(Russia) A Chesnokov | 6^{5} | 3
16 | (Sweden) J Björkman | 7^{7} | 6
Q | (France) T Guardiola | 3 | 5
(Australia) R Fromberg | 6 | 7
(Netherlands) J Eltingh | 2 | 6 | 4
8 | (Spain) S Bruguera | 6 | 4 | 6

Third round
(France) F Santoro | 6 | 5 | 1
16 | (Sweden) J Björkman | 3 | 7 | 6
(Australia) R Fromberg | 6 | 2 | 2
8 | (Spain) S Bruguera | 1 | 6 | 6

Quarterfinals
16 | (Sweden) J Björkman | 4 | 1
8 | (Spain) S Bruguera | 6 | 6

==== Section 2 ====
First round
3 | (Croatia) G Ivanišević | 7 | 6
(Spain) O Martinez | 5 | 1
(United States) V Spadea | 6 | 6
(Spain) C Costa | 4 | 3
(United States) R Reneberg | 7^{7} | 7^{7}
WC | (Italy) S Pescosolido | 6^{2} | 6^{5}
(Czech Republic) D Vacek | 1 | 2
14 | (Ukraine) A Medvedev | 6 | 6
11 | (Switzerland) M Rosset | 6^{4} | 3
(United States) J Tarango | 7^{7} | 6
LL | (Germany) O Gross | 6 | 3 | 6
(Czech Republic) P Korda | 4 | 6 | 3
(Austria) G Schaller | 2 | 6 | 3
Q | (Germany) M-K Goellner | 6 | 3 | 6
(United States) M Washington | 7 | 6
5 | (Spain) A Berasategui | 5 | 2

Second round
3 | (Croatia) G Ivanišević | 6 | 6
(United States) V Spadea | 4 | 3
(United States) R Reneberg | 4 | 4
14 | (Ukraine) A Medvedev | 6 | 6
(United States) J Tarango | w/o
LL | (Germany) O Gross
Q | (Germany) M-K Goellner | 6^{5} | 2
(United States) M Washington | 7^{7} | 6

Third round
3 | (Croatia) G Ivanišević | 6 | 7^{7}
14 | (Ukraine) A Medvedev | 1 | 6^{3}
(United States) J Tarango | 3 | 6 | 6
(United States) M Washington | 6 | 3 | 4

Quarterfinals
3 | (Croatia) G Ivanišević | 7^{7} | 6
(United States) J Tarango | 6^{2} | 4

=== Bottom half ===
==== Section 3 ====
First round
6 | (Russia) Y Kafelnikov | 6 | 5 | 3
Q | (Italy) C Borroni | 3 | 7 | 6
Q | (Spain) R Carretero | 6 | 6
WC | (Italy) G Pozzi | 3 | 3
WC | (Chile) M Ríos | 7 | 6
Q | (Spain) E Benfele Álvarez | 5 | 2
(France) A Boetsch | 2 | 6 | 3
12 | (Sweden) S Edberg | 6 | 4 | 6
13 | (Italy) A Gaudenzi | 6 | 6
(Russia) A Olhovskiy | 2 | 2
(Spain) J Sánchez | 1 | 6 | 3
(Spain) Á Corretja | 6 | 3 | 6
(Peru) J Yzaga | 6 | 6^{6} | 6
(Russia) A Volkov | 2 | 7^{8} | 4
(France) C Pioline | 4 | 1
4 | (South Africa) W Ferreira | 6 | 6

Second round
Q | (Italy) C Borroni | 7^{7} | 7^{7}
Q | (Spain) R Carretero | 6^{4} | 6^{5}
WC | (Chile) M Ríos | 3 | 3
12 | (Sweden) S Edberg | 6 | 6
13 | (Italy) A Gaudenzi | 6 | 6^{2} | 0
(Spain) Á Corretja | 3 | 7^{7} | 6
(Peru) J Yzaga | 4 | 6^{3}
4 | (South Africa) W Ferreira | 6 | 7^{7}

Third round
Q | (Italy) C Borroni | 0 | 2
12 | (Sweden) S Edberg | 6 | 6
(Spain) Á Corretja | 3 | 4
4 | (South Africa) W Ferreira | 6 | 6

Quarterfinals
12 | (Sweden) S Edberg | 2 | 0
4 | (South Africa) W Ferreira | 6 | 6

==== Section 4 ====
First round
7 | (Austria) T Muster | 6 | 6
(Netherlands) P Haarhuis | 4 | 4
Q | (Spain) M A Gorriz | 3 | 2
(Netherlands) J Siemerink | 6 | 6
(Uruguay) M Filippini | 6 | 2 | 4
Q | (Czech Republic) B Ulihrach | 3 | 6 | 6
(Spain) Á Costa | 6^{3} | 7 | 3
10 | (United States) T Martin | 7^{7} | 5 | 6
15 | (Czech Republic) K Nováček | 3 | 2
(Italy) R Furlan | 6 | 6
(Czech Republic) M Damm | 6 | 3 | 3
(Slovakia) K Kučera | 4 | 6 | 6
(Spain) T Carbonell | 6 | 6
(Germany) M Sinner | 2 | 4
WC | (Australia) M Philippoussis | 4 | 3
2 | (United States) M Chang | 6 | 6

Second round
7 | (Austria) T Muster | 3 | 6 | 6
(Netherlands) J Siemerink | 6 | 4 | 3
Q | (Czech Republic) B Ulihrach | 6 | 3 | 6
10 | (United States) T Martin | 4 | 6 | 3
(Italy) R Furlan | 6^{5} | 1
(Slovakia) K Kučera | 7^{7} | 6
(Spain) T Carbonell | 6 | 2 | 3
2 | (United States) M Chang | 2 | 6 | 6

Third round
7 | (Austria) T Muster | 6 | 6
Q | (Czech Republic) B Ulihrach | 2 | 2
(Slovakia) K Kučera | 2 | 6 | 4
2 | (United States) M Chang | 6 | 3 | 6

Quarterfinals
7 | (Austria) T Muster | 6 | 6
2 | (United States) M Chang | 3 | 2

== Qualifying ==
=== Qualifying seeds ===
1. (Norway) Christian Ruud (first round)
2. (Germany) Oliver Gross (qualifying competition, lucky loser)
3. (Czech Republic) Bohdan Ulihrach (qualified)
4. (Germany) Marc-Kevin Goellner (qualified)
5. (Germany) Carl-Uwe Steeb (first round)
6. (Germany) Jörn Renzenbrink (first round)
7. (Morocco) Karim Alami (qualifying competition)
8. (Italy) Diego Nargiso (first round)
9. (Argentina) Marcelo Charpentier (second round)
10. (Italy) Daniele Musa (qualifying competition)
11. (Italy) Laurence Tieleman (first round)
12. (Canada) Daniel Nestor (qualified)
13. (Spain) Albert Portas (first round)
14. (France) Frédéric Vitoux (first round)
15. (Spain) Emilio Benfele Álvarez (qualified)
16. (France) Thierry Guardiola (qualified)

=== Qualifiers ===
1. (France) Thierry Guardiola
2. (Spain) Emilio Benfele Álvarez
3. (Czech Republic) Bohdan Ulihrach
4. (Germany) Marc-Kevin Goellner
5. (Canada) Daniel Nestor
6. (Spain) Marcos Górriz
7. (Italy) Corrado Borroni
8. (Spain) Roberto Carretero

=== Lucky loser ===
1. (Germany) Oliver Gross

=== Qualifying draw ===
==== First qualifier ====
First round
1 | (Norway) Christian Ruud | 6 | 3 | 1
(Romania) Alexandru Rădulescu | 3 | 6 | 6
(Belgium) Tom Vanhoudt | 4 | 3
(Italy) Marco Meneschincheri | 6 | 6
(Argentina) Franco Squillari | 2 | 4
(The Bahamas) Mark Knowles | 6 | 6
(Chile) Gabriel Silberstein | 4 | 4
16 | (France) Thierry Guardiola | 6 | 6

Second round
(Romania) Alexandru Rădulescu | 6 | 6 | 6
(Italy) Marco Meneschincheri | 7 | 2 | 2
(The Bahamas) Mark Knowles | 3 | 3
16 | (France) Thierry Guardiola | 6 | 6

Qualifying competition
(Romania) Alexandru Rădulescu | 6 | 5 | 3
16 | (France) Thierry Guardiola | 4 | 7 | 6

==== Second qualifier ====
First round
2 | (Germany) Oliver Gross | 6 | 4 | 6
(Argentina) Luis Lobo | 1 | 6 | 4
(South Africa) Ellis Ferreira | 2 | 6 | 4
(Italy) Pietro Pennisi | 6 | 3 | 6
(Spain) Félix Mantilla | 6 | 6
WC | (Italy) Riccardo Ciruolo | 2 | 1
(Austria) Roland Burtscher | 4 | 2
15 | (Spain) Emilio Benfele Álvarez | 6 | 6

Second round
2 | (Germany) Oliver Gross | 6 | 2 | 7
(Italy) Pietro Pennisi | 4 | 6 | 6
(Spain) Félix Mantilla | 3 | 0
15 | (Spain) Emilio Benfele Álvarez | 6 | 6

Qualifying competition
2 | (Germany) Oliver Gross | 5 | 0
15 | (Spain) Emilio Benfele Álvarez | 7 | 6

==== Third qualifier ====
First round
3 | (Czech Republic) Bohdan Ulihrach | 7 | 6
(France) Nicolas Kischkewitz | 5 | 0
(France) Pier Gauthier | 3 | 1
(Italy) Massimo Valeri | 6 | 6
(Austria) Thomas Gollwitzer | 2 | 6 | 6
(Netherlands) Stephen Noteboom | 6 | 2 | 3
(Italy) Davide Sanguinetti | 6 | 6
14 | (France) Frédéric Vitoux | 1 | 1

Second round
3 | (Czech Republic) Bohdan Ulihrach | 7 | 6
(Italy) Massimo Valeri | 6 | 1
(Austria) Thomas Gollwitzer | 4 | 4
(Italy) Davide Sanguinetti | 6 | 6

Qualifying competition
3 | (Czech Republic) Bohdan Ulihrach | 6 | 6
(Italy) Davide Sanguinetti | 3 | 0

==== Fourth qualifier ====
First round
4 | (Germany) Marc-Kevin Goellner | 6 | 6
(Germany) Jan Weinzierl | 2 | 4
WC | (Italy) Cristian Brandi | 1 | 1
(France) Jérôme Golmard | 6 | 6
(South Africa) Lan Bale | 4 | 4
(Sweden) Mikael Stadling | 6 | 6
(Czech Republic) Libor Němeček | 6 | 6
13 | (Spain) Albert Portas | 1 | 4

Second round
4 | (Germany) Marc-Kevin Goellner | 6 | 6 | 6
(France) Jérôme Golmard | 7 | 2 | 3
(Sweden) Mikael Stadling | 4 | 4
(Czech Republic) Libor Němeček | 6 | 6

Qualifying competition
4 | (Germany) Marc-Kevin Goellner | 6 | 6
(Czech Republic) Libor Němeček | 2 | 1

==== Fifth qualifier ====
First round
5 | (Germany) Carl-Uwe Steeb | 4 | 5
WC | (Italy) Stefano Cobolli | 6 | 7
(Romania) Dinu Pescariu | 6 | 3 | 6
(Italy) Gabrio Castrichella | 3 | 6 | 3
(Italy) Filippo Messori | 2 | 2
(Italy) Massimo Calvelli | 6 | 6
(Italy) Vincenzo Carlone | 3 | 4
12 | (Canada) Daniel Nestor | 6 | 6

Second round
WC | (Italy) Stefano Cobolli | 1 | 2
(Romania) Dinu Pescariu | 6 | 6
(Italy) Massimo Calvelli | 6 | 6
12 | (Canada) Daniel Nestor | 7 | 7

Qualifying competition
(Romania) Dinu Pescariu | 3 | 3
12 | (Canada) Daniel Nestor | 6 | 6

==== Sixth qualifier ====
First round
6 | (Germany) Jörn Renzenbrink | 4 | 6 | 4
(Spain) Marcos Górriz | 6 | 3 | 6
(South Africa) Marius Barnard | 6 | 7 | 6
(Spain) Jordi Mas | 7 | 6 | 3
(Ecuador) Luis Morejón | 6 | 6
WC | (Italy) Giuseppe Montenet | 0 | 0
(Italy) Vincenzo Santopadre | 7 | 6
11 | (Italy) Laurence Tieleman | 5 | 4

Second round
(Spain) Marcos Górriz | 2 | 6 | 6
(South Africa) Marius Barnard | 6 | 2 | 2
(Ecuador) Luis Morejón | 4 | 3
(Italy) Vincenzo Santopadre | 6 | 6

Qualifying competition
(Spain) Marcos Górriz | 6 | 5 | 6
(Italy) Vincenzo Santopadre | 2 | 7 | 4

==== Seventh qualifier ====
First round
7 | (Morocco) Karim Alami | 6 | 6
(Italy) Giorgio Galimberti | 3 | 1
(Italy) Fabio Rizzo | 6 | 6
(Italy) Mosé Navarra | 3 | 3
(Peru) Américo Venero | 4 | 3
(Italy) Corrado Borroni | 6 | 6
WC | (Italy) Claudio Pistolesi | 5 | 2
9 | (Argentina) Marcelo Charpentier | 7 | 6

Second round
7 | (Morocco) Karim Alami | 6 | 6
(Italy) Fabio Rizzo | 4 | 2
(Italy) Corrado Borroni | 6 | 6
9 | (Argentina) Marcelo Charpentier | 4 | 2

Qualifying competition
7 | (Morocco) Karim Alami | 6 | 2
(Italy) Corrado Borroni | 7 | 6

==== Eighth qualifier ====
First round
8 | (Italy) Diego Nargiso | 6 | 1 | 4
(France) Thierry Champion | 1 | 6 | 6
(Italy) Massimo Bertolini | 3 | 3
(Spain) Roberto Carretero | 6 | 6
(Italy) Elia Grossi | 6 | 3 | 4
(Italy) Federico Mordegan | 4 | 6 | 6
WC | (Italy) Stefano Tarallo | 3 | 3
10 | (Italy) Daniele Musa | 6 | 6

Second round
(France) Thierry Champion | 4 | 4
(Spain) Roberto Carretero | 6 | 6
(Italy) Federico Mordegan | 4 | 6
10 | (Italy) Daniele Musa | 6 | 7

Qualifying competition
(Spain) Roberto Carretero | 6 | 6
10 | (Italy) Daniele Musa | 4 | 3
