= Corrado Borroni =

Italian tennis player

- Full name: Corrado Borroni
- Country (sports): Italy
- Born: 6 May 1973 (age 52); Bollate, Italy
- Height: 6 ft 1 in (185 cm)
- Plays: Right-handed
- Prize money: $53,599

Singles
- Career record: 2–3
- Highest ranking: No. 196 (29 January 1996)

Doubles
- Highest ranking: No. 460 (5 October 1992)

Corrado Borroni (born 6 May 1973) is a former professional tennis player from Italy.

== Biography ==
Borroni, who comes from Milan, began playing tennis at the age of five and turned professional in 1991.

A right-handed player, Borroni is most noted for his performance on debut at the 1995 Italian Open (Rome Masters), where he made the third round as a qualifier. In the opening round, he upset world number nine Yevgeny Kafelnikov, who was ranked over 400 places ahead of him. He then beat Roberto Carretero in the second round, before his run was ended by Stefan Edberg. When he made it through qualifying at the same tournament in 1996, he again came up against Kafelnikov in the first round and was beaten in three sets.
