= 1995 WTA German Open – Singles =

Singles
- 1995 WTA German Open
- 1994 Champion: (Germany) Steffi Graf

Final
- Champion: (Spain) Arantxa Sánchez Vicario
- Runner-up: (Bulgaria) Magdalena Maleeva
- Score: 6–4, 6–1

Details
- Draw: 56
- Seeds: 16

Events
Singles	Doubles
- WTA German Open

Arantxa Sánchez Vicario defeated Magdalena Maleeva in the final, 6–4, 6–1 to win the singles tennis title at the 1995 WTA German Open.

Steffi Graf was the four-time reigning champion, but did not compete that year.

== Seeds ==
A champion seed is indicated in bold text while text in italics indicates the round in which that seed was eliminated. The top eight seeds received a bye to the second round.

1. (Spain) **Arantxa Sánchez Vicario (champion)**
2. (France) Mary Pierce (quarterfinals)
3. n/a
4. (Argentina) Gabriela Sabatini (third round)
5. (Bulgaria) Magdalena Maleeva (final)
6. (Japan) Kimiko Date (quarterfinals)
7. (Belarus) Natasha Zvereva (semifinals)
8. (United States) Mary Joe Fernández (third round)
9. (Japan) Naoko Sawamatsu (second round)
10. (South Africa) Amanda Coetzer (second round)
11. (United States) Lori McNeil (first round)
12. (France) Julie Halard (third round)
13. (Czech Republic) Helena Suková (first round)
14. (Argentina) Inés Gorrochategui (second round)
15. (United States) Marianne Werdel-Witmeyer (first round)
16. (Switzerland) Martina Hingis (second round)

== Draw ==
Key

- Q = Qualifier
- WC = Wild card
- LL = Lucky loser
- Alt = Alternate
- ITF = ITF entry
- PR = Protected ranking
- SR = Special ranking
- SE = Special exempt
- JE = Junior exempt
- JR = Junior Accelerator Programme entrant
- CO = College Accelerator Programme entrant
- NG = Next Gen Accelerator Program entrant
- w/o = Walkover
- r = Retired
- d = Defaulted

=== Finals ===
Semifinals
1	(Spain) **Arantxa Sánchez Vicario**	5	**6**	**6**
(Romania) Irina Spîrlea	**7**	4	2
7	(Belarus) Natasha Zvereva	4	6
5	(Bulgaria) **Magdalena Maleeva**	**6**	**7**

Final
1	(Spain) **Arantxa Sánchez Vicario**	**6**	**6**
5	(Bulgaria) Magdalena Maleeva	4	1

=== Top half ===
==== Section 1 ====
First round
(France) I Demongeot	3	5
(France) **N Tauziat**	**6**	**7**
(Belarus) **T Ignatieva**	4	**6**	**6**
(Spain) N Ávila Bonastre	**6**	4	0
(United States) **A Grossman**	2	**6**	**7**
15	(United States) M Werdel-Witmeyer	**6**	3	5
12	(France) **J Halard**	4	**6**	**6**
(United States) L Harvey-Wild	**6**	3	3
(Slovakia) **R Zrubáková**	**6**	**7**
(Israel) A Smashnova	3	6
Q	(Moldova) S Komleva	2	**6**	2
WC	(Germany) **S Meier**	**6**	3	**6**

Second round
1	(Spain) **A Sánchez Vicario**	**6**	**6**
(France) N Tauziat	2	3
(Belarus) **T Ignatieva**	**7**	**6**
(United States) A Grossman	6	3
12	(France) **J Halard**	**7**	**6**
(Slovakia) R Zrubáková	5	1
WC	(Germany) S Meier	0	4
6	(Japan) **K Date**	**6**	**6**

Third round
1	(Spain) **A Sánchez Vicario**	**6**	**6**
(Belarus) T Ignatieva	2	1
12	(France) J Halard	2	3
6	(Japan) **K Date**	**6**	**6**

Quarterfinals
1	(Spain) **A Sánchez Vicario**	**6**	**6**
6	(Japan) K Date	3	0

==== Section 2 ====
First round
(Hungary) **A Temesvári**	**6**	2	**6**
Q	(Russia) E Maniokova	2	**6**	4
(Latvia) L Savchenko	4	2
(Germany) **P Begerow**	**6**	**6**
WC	(Germany) **J Kandarr**	**6**	**6**
13	(Czech Republic) H Suková	0	3
10	(South Africa) **A Coetzer**	**6**	**6**
(South Africa) E Reinach	0	2
Q	(France) N van Lottum	0	4
(Romania) **I Spîrlea**	**6**	**6**
Q	(Slovakia) J Husárová	3	**7**	2
(Germany) **B Rittner**	**6**	6	**6**

Second round
LL	(United States) M Tu	3	6
(Hungary) **A Temesvári**	**6**	**7**
(Germany) **P Begerow**	4	**6**	**7**
WC	(Germany) J Kandarr	**6**	1	5
10	(South Africa) A Coetzer	5	4
(Romania) **I Spîrlea**	**7**	**6**
(Germany) B Rittner	2	2
8	(United States) **M J Fernández**	**6**	**6**

Third round
(Hungary) A Temesvári	4	3
(Germany) **P Begerow**	**6**	**6**
(Romania) **I Spîrlea**	**6**	**6**
8	(United States) M J Fernández	2	1

Quarterfinals
(Germany) P Begerow	4	3
(Romania) **I Spîrlea**	**6**	**6**

=== Bottom half ===
==== Section 3 ====
First round
(Russia) E Likhovtseva	4	3
WC	(Germany) **S Wächtershäuser**	**6**	**6**
(Germany) **S Hack**	**6**	**6**
(Bulgaria) K Maleeva	2	3
LL	(Spain) M Sánchez Lorenzo	4	0
16	(Switzerland) **M Hingis**	**6**	**6**
14	(Argentina) **I Gorrochategui**	**6**	**6**
(Bulgaria) E Pampoulova	3	2
(Australia) **N Bradtke**	**6**	**6**
(Italy) S Cecchini	2	3
(Mexico) **A Gavaldón**	3	**6**	**6**
(Russia) E Makarova	**6**	1	3

Second round
7	(Belarus) **N Zvereva**	**6**	**6**
WC	(Germany) S Wächtershäuser	0	3
(Germany) **S Hack**	**6**	1	**6**
16	(Switzerland) M Hingis	3	**6**	3
14	(Argentina) I Gorrochategui	**6**	2	4
(Australia) **N Bradtke**	4	**6**	**6**
(Mexico) A Gavaldón	4	0
4	(Argentina) **G Sabatini**	**6**	**6**

Third round
7	(Belarus) **N Zvereva**	2	**7**	**6**
(Germany) S Hack	**6**	5	4
(Australia) **N Bradtke**	**7**	**6**
4	(Argentina) G Sabatini	6	4

Quarterfinals
7	(Belarus) **N Zvereva**	**7**	**6**
(Australia) N Bradtke	6	2

==== Section 4 ====
First round
(Germany) **M Babel**	**6**	**6**
(Spain) V Ruano-Pascual	2	3
(United States) **T Whitlinger-Jones**	3	**7**	**6**
Q	(Italy) M Grossi	**6**	6	2
Q	(Russia) **T Panova**	**6**	2	**6**
11	(United States) L McNeil	4	**6**	3
9	(Japan) **N Sawamatsu**	**6**	**6**
(United States) K Po	2	4
(Argentina) **F Labat**	**6**	**6**
Q	(Italy) F Fortuni	2	3
(Slovakia) **K Habšudová**	**6**	**6**
Q	(Finland) N Dahlman	0	3

Second round
5	(Bulgaria) **M Maleeva**	**6**	**6**
(Germany) M Babel	3	1
(United States) **T Whitlinger-Jones**	**6**	**6**
Q	(Russia) T Panova	4	4
9	(Japan) N Sawamatsu	5	**7**	5
(Argentina) **F Labat**	**7**	5	**7**
(Slovakia) K Habšudová	2	4
2	(France) **M Pierce**	**6**	**6**

Third round
5	(Bulgaria) **M Maleeva**	5	**6**	**6**
(United States) T Whitlinger-Jones	**7**	2	1
(Argentina) F Labat	5	3
2	(France) **M Pierce**	**7**	**6**

Quarterfinals
5	(Bulgaria) **M Maleeva**	**7**	4	**6**
2	(France) M Pierce	6	**6**	4
