= Tina Križan =

Slovenian tennis player

- Country (sports): Yugoslavia (1989–1991); Slovenia (1991–2007)
- Residence: London, Ljubljana
- Born: 18 March 1974 (age 51) Maribor, Slovenia, Yugoslavia
- Height: 1.75 m (5 ft 9 in)
- Turned pro: 1990
- Retired: 2007
- Plays: Right-handed
- Prize money: $868,461

Singles
- Career record: 211–210
- Career titles: 0 WTA 1 ITF
- Highest ranking: 95 (16 January 1995)

Grand Slam singles results
- Australian Open: 1R 1995,2R (1996)
- French Open: 1R (1995)
- Wimbledon: 1R (1995)
- US Open: 2R (1996, 1999)

Doubles
- Career record: 286–277
- Career titles: 6 WTA 10 ITF
- Highest ranking: 19 (18 March 2002)

Grand Slam doubles results
- Australian Open: QF (2002)
- French Open: 2R (1998–99, 2000, 2003–04)
- Wimbledon: QF (2002)
- US Open: QF (2001)

Tina Križan (born 18 March 1974) is a former Slovenian professional tennis player.

Known primarily for her achievements playing doubles, she reached a career-high singles ranking of 95, including a win over Jana Novotna, and a career-high doubles ranking of 19 in 2002. She won six WTA doubles titles and was runner-up in more than 10 WTA doubles events. She also won 10 ITF tournaments.

She represented Slovenia in doubles at the Olympics in 1992, 2000, and 2004, and in the latter two events, her partner was Katarina Srebotnik). She qualified twice for the doubles season end Masters Championships in Munich and Los Angeles.

Tina Križan holds the record for Fed Cup appearances for her country, representing Slovenia in 46 ties and playing a record 72 matches.

She graduated from Maribor University in 2004.

== WTA Tour finals ==
=== Doubles 20 (6–14) ===
Legend: Before 2009	Legend: Starting in 2009
Grand Slam tournaments (0)
WTA Championships (0)
Tier I (0)	Premier Mandatory (0)
Tier II (0)	Premier 5 (0)
Tier III (0)	Premier (0)
Tier IV & V (0)	International (0)

Result	No.	Date	Tournament	Surface	Partner	Opponents	Score
Win	1.	Oct 1995	Surabaya, Indonesia	Hard	(Netherlands) Petra Kamstra	(Japan) Nana Miyagi (United States) Stephanie Reece	2–6, 6–4, 6–1
Loss	1.	Oct 1996	Surabaya, Indonesia	Hard	(France) Noëlle van Lottum	(France) Alexandra Fusai (Australia) Kerry-Anne Guse	4–6, 4–6
Loss	2.	Nov 1996	Pattaya, Thailand	Hard	(Japan) Nana Miyagi	(Japan) Miho Saeki (Japan) Yuka Yoshida	2–6, 3–6
Win	2.	Apr 1998	Makarska, Croatia	Clay	(Slovenia) Katarina Srebotnik	(Russia) Eugenia Kulikovskaya (Austria) Karin Kschwendt	7–6^{(7–3)}, 6–1
Loss	3.	Jul 1998	Maria Lankowitz, Austria	Clay	(Slovenia) Katarina Srebotnik	(Argentina) Laura Montalvo (Argentina) Paola Suárez	1–6, 2–6
Win	3.	Jul 1999	Palermo, Italy	Clay	(Slovenia) Katarina Srebotnik	(Canada) Sonya Jeyaseelan (Sweden) Åsa Svensson	4–6, 6–3, 6–0
Loss	4.	Sep 1999	Luxembourg	Carpet	(Slovenia) Katarina Srebotnik	(Romania) Irina Spîrlea (Netherlands) Caroline Vis	1–6, 2–6
Loss	5.	Oct 1999	Linz, Austria	Carpet	(Latvia) Larisa Savchenko	(Romania) Irina Spîrlea (Netherlands) Caroline Vis	4–6, 3–6
Win	4.	Apr 2000	Estoril, Portugal	Clay	(Slovenia) Katarina Srebotnik	(Netherlands) Amanda Hopmans (Spain) Cristina Torrens Valero	6–0, 7–6^{(11–9)}
Loss	6.	May 2000	Bol, Croatia	Clay	(Slovenia) Katarina Srebotnik	(France) Julie Halard-Decugis (United States) Corina Morariu	2–6, 2–6
Loss	7.	Oct 2000	Japan Open, Japan	Hard	(Slovenia) Katarina Srebotnik	(France) Julie Halard-Decugis (United States) Corina Morariu	1–6, 2–6
Loss	8.	Nov 2000	Pattaya, Thailand	Hard	(Slovenia) Katarina Srebotnik	(Indonesia) Yayuk Basuki (Netherlands) Caroline Vis	3–6, 3–6
Loss	9.	Apr 2001	Estoril, Portugal	Clay	(Slovenia) Katarina Srebotnik	(Czech Republic) Květa Hrdličková (Germany) Barbara Rittner	6–3, 5–7, 1–6
Loss	10.	Aug 2001	Canadian Open, Canada	Hard	(Slovenia) Katarina Srebotnik	(United States) Kimberly Po-Messerli (Australia) Nicole Pratt	3–6, 1–6
Win	5.	Sep 2001	Waikoloa, Hawaii, USA	Hard	(Slovenia) Katarina Srebotnik	(Belgium) Els Callens (Australia) Nicole Pratt	6–2, 6–3
Loss	11.	Feb 2002	Bogotá, Colombia	Clay	(Slovenia) Katarina Srebotnik	(Spain) Virginia Ruano Pascual (Argentina) Paola Suárez	2–6, 1–6
Loss	12.	Mar 2002	Acapulco, Mexico	Clay	(Slovenia) Katarina Srebotnik	(Spain) Virginia Ruano Pascual (Argentina) Paola Suárez	5–7, 1–6
Loss	13.	Feb 2003	Bogotá, Colombia	Clay	(Ukraine) Tatiana Perebiynis	(Slovenia) Katarina Srebotnik (Sweden) Åsa Carlsson	2–6, 1–6
Loss	14.	May 2004	Strasbourg, France	Clay	(Slovenia) Katarina Srebotnik	(Australia) Lisa McShea (Venezuela) Milagros Sequera	4–6, 1–6
Win	6.	Jan 2005	Canberra, Australia	Hard	(Italy) Tathiana Garbin	(Czech Republic) Gabriela Navrátilová (Czech Republic) Michaela Paštiková	7–5, 1–6, 6–4

== ITF finals ==
=== Singles (1-0) ===
$100,000 tournaments
$75,000 tournaments
$50,000 tournaments
$25,000 tournaments
$10,000 tournaments

Result	No.	Date	Tournament	Surface	Opponent	Score
Win	1.	13 February 2000	Ljubljana, Slovenia	Carpet (i)	(Germany) Miriam Schnitzer	6–2, 6–3

=== Doubles (10–11) ===
Result	No.	Date	Tournament	Surface	Partner	Opponents	Score
Loss	1.	15 June 1992	Maribor, Slovenia	Clay	(Slovenia) Karin Lušnic	(Germany) Renata Kochta (Czechoslovakia) Pavlína Rajzlová	6–2, 4–6, 4–6
Win	2.	20 July 1992	Darmstadt, Germany	Clay	(United States) Nicole Arendt	(Germany) Anouschka Popp (Germany) Sandra Wächtershäuser	6–2, 6–1
Loss	3.	12 July 1993	Darmstadt, Germany	Clay	(Italy) Laura Garrone	(Poland) Magdalena Feistel (Poland) Katarzyna Teodorowicz	6–4, 4–6, 5–7
Win	4.	8 August 1993	Sopot, Poland	Clay	(Czech Republic) Květa Peschke	(Slovakia) Denisa Krajčovičová (Slovakia) Katarína Studeníková	6–3, 6–1
Loss	5.	15 November 1993	Port Pirie, Australia	Clay	(Czech Republic) Eva Martincová	(Australia) Lisa McShea (Canada) Vanessa Webb	6–7^{(5)}, 3–6
Loss	6.	10 July 1994	Erlangen, Germany	Clay	(Slovakia) Janette Husárová	(Sweden) Maria Lindström (Sweden) Maria Strandlund	2–6, 2–6
Loss	7.	31 July 1995	Sopot, Poland	Clay	(Slovakia) Katarína Studeníková	(Czech Republic) Petra Kučová (Czech Republic) Lenka Němečková	0–2 ret.
Win	8.	14 August 1995	Maribor, Slovenia	Clay	(Italy) Laura Garrone	(Czech Republic) Eva Melicharová (Czech Republic) Helena Vildová	6–4, 3–6, 6–2
Loss	9.	26 February 1996	Southampton, Great Britain	Carpet (i)	(Italy) Laura Golarsa	(United Kingdom) Valda Lake (United Kingdom) Clare Wood	4–6, 6–4, 3–6
Win	10.	14 July 1996	Istanbul, Turkey	Hard	(Ukraine) Olga Lugina	(Italy) Laura Garrone (Italy) Flora Perfetti	6–4, 6–2
Win	11.	14 December 1997	Bad Gögging, Germany	Carpet (i)	(Austria) Sylvia Plischke	(France) Emmanuelle Curutchet (France) Sophie Georges	6–3, 6–3
Win	12.	15 February 1998	Rogaška Slatina, Slovenia	Hard (i)	(Slovenia) Katarina Srebotnik	(Slovenia) Tina Pisnik (Germany) Miriam Schnitzer	6–0, 6–3
Loss	13.	15 March 1998	Biel, Switzerland	Hard (i)	(Belgium) Nancy Feber	(Germany) Kirstin Freye (France) Noëlle van Lottum	3–6, 6–3, 6–7^{(4–7)}
Win	14.	25 October 1998	Welwyn, United Kingdom	Carpet (i)	(Belgium) Laurence Courtois	(Australia) Louise Pleming (United Kingdom) Samantha Smith	7–6, 6–4
Loss	15.	5 december 1998	New Delhi, India	Hard	(Austria) Karin Kschwendt	(Czech Republic) Lenka Cenková (Netherlands) Amanda Hopmans	W/O
Win	16.	8 February 1999	Rogaška Slatina, Slovenia	Carpet (i)	(Slovenia) Katarina Srebotnik	(Czech Republic) Eva Martincová (Bulgaria) Svetlana Krivencheva	7–5, 6–2
Loss	17.	22 February 1999	Bushey, United Kingdom	Carpet (i)	(Bulgaria) Svetlana Krivencheva	(Switzerland) Emmanuelle Gagliardi (Hungary) Katalin Marosi	7–6^{(7–4)}, 2–6, 6–7^{(0–7)}
Win	18.	9 May 1999	Bratislava, Slovakia	Clay	(Slovenia) Katarina Srebotnik	(Czech Republic) Lenka Němečková (Slovakia) Radka Zrubáková	6–1, 6–3
Win	19.	20 February 2000	Redbridge, United Kingdom	Hard (i)	(France) Alexandra Fusai	(United Kingdom) Julie Pullin (United Kingdom) Lorna Woodroffe	7–6^{(7–4)}, 3–6, 7–6^{(7–1)}
Loss	20.	3 April 2000	Dubai, United Arab Emirates	Hard	(Germany) Angelika Bachmann	(Italy) Tathiana Garbin (Hungary) Katalin Marosi	6–7^{(5–7)}, 3–6
Loss	21.	11 February 2001	Redbridge, United Kingdom	Hard (i)	(Kazakhstan) Irina Selyutina	(United Kingdom) Julie Pullin (United Kingdom) Lorna Woodroffe	1–6, 3–6
