= 1995 WTA German Open – Doubles =

Doubles
- 1995 WTA German Open

Final
- Champions: (South Africa) Amanda Coetzer (Argentina) Inés Gorrochategui
- Runners-up: (Argentina) Gabriela Sabatini (Latvia) Larisa Savchenko
- Score: 4–6, 7–6, 6–2

Details
- Draw: 28
- Seeds: 8

Events
Singles	Doubles
- WTA German Open

Gigi Fernández and Natasha Zvereva were the defending champions but lost in the quarterfinals to Amanda Coetzer and Inés Gorrochategui.

Coetzer and Gorrochategui won in the final 4–6, 7–6, 6–2 against Gabriela Sabatini and Larisa Savchenko.

== Seeds ==
Champion seeds are indicated in bold text while text in italics indicates the round in which those seeds were eliminated. The top four seeded teams received byes into the second round.

1. (Czech Republic) Jana Novotná / (Spain) Arantxa Sánchez Vicario (semifinals)
2. (United States) Gigi Fernández / (Belarus) Natasha Zvereva (quarterfinals)
3. (Argentina) Gabriela Sabatini / (Latvia) Larisa Savchenko (final)
4. (Netherlands) Manon Bollegraf / (Australia) Rennae Stubbs (semifinals)
5. (France) Julie Halard / (France) Nathalie Tauziat (quarterfinals)
6. (South Africa) **Amanda Coetzer** / (Argentina) **Inés Gorrochategui (champions)**
7. (Australia) Nicole Bradtke / (United States) Mary Joe Fernández (quarterfinals)
8. (United States) Linda Harvey-Wild / (Bulgaria) Katerina Maleeva (first round)

== Draw ==
Key

- Q = Qualifier
- WC = Wild card
- LL = Lucky loser
- Alt = Alternate
- ITF = ITF entry
- PR = Protected ranking
- SR = Special ranking
- SE = Special exempt
- JE = Junior exempt
- JR = Junior Accelerator Programme entrant
- CO = College Accelerator Programme entrant
- NG = Next Gen Accelerator Program entrant
- w/o = Walkover
- r = Retired
- d = Defaulted

=== Final ===
Final
3	(Argentina) Gabriela Sabatini (Latvia) Larisa Savchenko	**6**	6	2
6	(South Africa) **Amanda Coetzer** (Argentina) **Inés Gorrochategui**	4	**7**	**6**

=== Top half ===
First round
(United States) M Werdel-Witmeyer (United States) T Whitlinger-Jones	2	1
(Italy) **S Cecchini** (France) **I Demongeot**	**6**	**6**
(United States) L McNeil (Czech Republic) H Suková	4	5
(Russia) **E Makarova** (Russia) **E Maniokova**	**6**	**7**
(United Kingdom) V Lake (United States) K Po	2	1
5	(France) **J Halard** (France) **N Tauziat**	**6**	**6**
(South Africa) **E Reinach** (Romania) **I Spîrlea**	**6**	**6**
(Argentina) F Labat (Hungary) A Temesvári	3	4
(Slovakia) **K Habšudová** (Slovakia) **R Zrubáková**	0	**6**	**7**
(Japan) N Kijimuta (Japan) N Sawamatsu	**6**	3	5
(Spain) S Ramón-Cortés (United States) M Tu	3	3
7	(Australia) **N Bradtke** (United States) **M J Fernández**	**6**	**6**

Second round
1	(Czech Republic) **J Novotná** (Spain) **A Sánchez Vicario**	4	**6**	**6**
(Italy) S Cecchini (France) I Demongeot	**6**	1	2
(Russia) E Makarova (Russia) E Maniokova	3	1
5	(France) **J Halard** (France) **N Tauziat**	**6**	**6**
3	(Argentina) **G Sabatini** (Latvia) **L Savchenko**	**6**	**0**
(South Africa) E Reinach (Romania) I Spîrlea	3	1	r
(Slovakia) K Habšudová (Slovakia) R Zrubáková	3	r
7	(Australia) **N Bradtke** (United States) **M J Fernández**	**6**

Quarterfinals
1	(Czech Republic) **J Novotná** (Spain) **A Sánchez Vicario**	**6**	**6**
5	(France) J Halard (France) N Tauziat	3	3
3	(Argentina) **G Sabatini** (Latvia) **L Savchenko**	**6**	**6**
7	(Australia) N Bradtke (United States) M J Fernández	1	3

Semifinals
1	(Czech Republic) J Novotná (Spain) A Sánchez Vicario	4	1
3	(Argentina) **G Sabatini** (Latvia) **L Savchenko**	**6**	**6**

=== Bottom half ===
First round
8	(United States) L Harvey-Wild (Bulgaria) K Maleeva	5	1
Q	(Germany) **A Kerek** (Moldova) **S Komleva**	**7**	**6**
(United States) A Grossman (Slovakia) J Husárová	3	3
(Czech Republic) **E Martincová** (Czech Republic) **J Pospíšilová**	**6**	**6**
(Finland) **N Dahlman** (Russia) **E Likhovtseva**	**6**	**6**
(Czech Republic) P Kučová (Poland) M Mroz	4	4
6	(South Africa) **A Coetzer** (Argentina) **I Gorrochategui**	**6**	**6**
(Switzerland) M Hingis (Germany) C Schneider	4	4
WC	(Germany) **S Schmidle** (Germany) **S Wächtershäuser**	**6**	4	**6**
WC	(Germany) S Meier (Germany) M Weingärtner	1	**6**	3
(Argentina) M Paz (United States) S Stafford	5	4
(Germany) **B Rittner** (Bulgaria) **E Pampoulova**	**7**	**6**

Second round
Q	(Germany) **A Kerek** (Moldova) **S Komleva**	**7**	**6**
(Czech Republic) E Martincová (Czech Republic) J Pospíšilová	6	4
(Finland) N Dahlman (Russia) E Likhovtseva	1	3
4	(Netherlands) **M Bollegraf** (Australia) **R Stubbs**	**6**	**6**
6	(South Africa) **A Coetzer** (Argentina) **I Gorrochategui**	**6**	2	**6**
WC	(Germany) S Schmidle (Germany) S Wächtershäuser	1	**6**	2
(Germany) B Rittner (Bulgaria) E Pampoulova	2	0
2	(United States) **G Fernández** (Belarus) **N Zvereva**	**6**	**6**

Quarterfinals
Q	(Germany) A Kerek (Moldova) S Komleva	0	3
4	(Netherlands) **M Bollegraf** (Australia) **R Stubbs**	**6**	**6**
6	(South Africa) **A Coetzer** (Argentina) **I Gorrochategui**	1	**7**
2	(United States) G Fernández (Belarus) N Zvereva	**6**	6	r

Semifinals
4	(Netherlands) M Bollegraf (Australia) R Stubbs	**6**	5	6
6	(South Africa) **A Coetzer** (Argentina) **I Gorrochategui**	3	**7**	**7**
