= Sandra Wächtershäuser =

German tennis player

- ITF name: Sandra Waechtershauser
- Country (sports): Germany
- Born: 4 March 1975 (age 50)
- Plays: Left-handed
- Prize money: $37,122

Singles
- Highest ranking: No. 181 (10 July 1995)

Grand Slam singles results
- US Open: Q1 (1995)

Doubles
- Career titles: 1 ITF
- Highest ranking: No. 186 (29 April 1996)

Sandra Wächtershäuser (born 4 March 1975), also spelled Waechtershauser or Waechtershaeuser, is a German former professional tennis player.

A left-handed player from Schöneck, Wächtershäuser played on the professional tour in the 1990s and reached a best singles ranking of 181. She featured in the qualifying draw for the 1995 US Open and made the second round of the 1995 German Open, by beating world number 41 Elena Likhovtseva.

== ITF finals ==
$25,000 tournaments
$10,000 tournaments

=== Doubles: 2 (1–1) ===
Result	No.	Date	Tournament	Surface	Partner	Opponents	Score
Loss	1.	20 July 1992	Darmstadt, Germany	Clay	(Germany) Anouschka Popp	(Slovenia) Tina Križan (United States) Nicole Arendt	2–6, 1–6
Win	1.	7 March 1994	Offenbach, Germany	Carpet	(Germany) Petra Winzenhöller	(Japan) Yuka Yoshida (Japan) Hiroko Mochizuki	7–6, 6–3
