= 1995 Canadian Open – Men's singles =

Men's singles
- 1995 Canadian Open

Final
- Champions: (United States) Andre Agassi
- Runners-up: (United States) Pete Sampras
- Score: 3–6, 6–2, 6–3

Events
Singles	men	women
Doubles	men	women
← 1994 ·	Canadian Open	· 1996 →

Defending champion Andre Agassi defeated Pete Sampras in the final, 3–6, 6–2, 6–3 to win the men's singles tennis title at the 1995 Canadian Open.

== Seeds ==
A champion seed is indicated in bold text while text in italics indicates the round in which that seed was eliminated.

1. (United States) **Andre Agassi (champion)**
2. (United States) Pete Sampras (final)
3. (United States) Michael Chang (quarterfinals)
4. (Russia) Yevgeny Kafelnikov (quarterfinals)
5. (Croatia) Goran Ivanišević (third round)
6. (South Africa) Wayne Ferreira (third round)
7. (Germany) Michael Stich (quarterfinals)
8. (Switzerland) Marc Rosset (second round)
9. (Spain) Sergi Bruguera (third round)
10. (United States) Jim Courier (third round)
11. (Sweden) Stefan Edberg (second round)
12. (Sweden) Thomas Enqvist (semifinals)
13. (United States) Todd Martin (third round)
14. (United States) David Wheaton (first round)
15. (Australia) Jason Stoltenberg (second round)
16. (Russia) Alexander Volkov (first round)

== Draw ==
=== Key ===
- Q = Qualifier
- WC = Wild card
- LL = Lucky loser
- Alt = Alternate
- SE = Special exempt
- PR = Protected ranking
- ITF = ITF entry
- JE = Junior exempt
- w/o = Walkover
- r = Retired
- d = Defaulted
- SR = Special ranking

=== Finals ===
Semifinals
1	(United States) **Andre Agassi**	**6**	**6**
(Sweden) Mats Wilander	2	0
12	(Sweden) Thomas Enqvist	**6**	3	6^{3}
2	(United States) **Pete Sampras**	3	**6**	**7^{7}**

Final
1	(United States) **Andre Agassi**	3	**6**	**6**
2	(United States) Pete Sampras	**6**	2	3

=== Top half ===
==== Section 1 ====
First round
Q	(Kenya) P Wekesa	1	6^{2}
(United States) **J Tarango**	**6**	**7^{7}**
WC	(Canada) A Sznajder	**7^{7}**	2	4
Q	(Czech Republic) **D Vacek**	6^{4}	**6**	**6**
(France) **A Boetsch**	**6**	**6**
16	(Russia) A Volkov	1	1
9	(Spain) **S Bruguera**	**6**	6^{2}	**6**
(Italy) C Caratti	1	**7^{7}**	4
(United States) **A Krickstein**	**6**	**6**
(United States) J Grabb	4	4
(Italy) G Pozzi	2	4
(United States) **MV Washington**	**6**	**6**

Second round
1	(United States) **A Agassi**	**6**	**6**
(United States) J Tarango	3	4
Q	(Czech Republic) **D Vacek**	**6**	**6**
(France) A Boetsch	2	4
9	(Spain) **S Bruguera**	**6**	**7^{7}**
(United States) A Krickstein	2	6^{4}
(United States) **MV Washington**	**6**	**7^{7}**
8	(Switzerland) M Rosset	3	6^{4}

Third round
1	(United States) **A Agassi**	**6**	**6**
Q	(Czech Republic) D Vacek	4	2
9	(Spain) S Bruguera	4	2
(United States) **MV Washington**	**6**	**6**

Quarterfinals
1	(United States) **A Agassi**	**7^{7}**	**6**
(United States) MV Washington	6^{5}	3

==== Section 2 ====
First round
Q	(United States) S Herdoiza	3	2
(Australia) **M Philippoussis**	**6**	**6**
Q	(Netherlands) **R Krajicek**	**7**	**6**
(United Kingdom) J Bates	5	2
(New Zealand) **B Steven**	**6**	3	**6**
14	(United States) D Wheaton	4	**6**	3
11	(Sweden) **S Edberg**	2	**6**	**6**
WC	(Canada) A Chang	**6**	1	1
(Sweden) **M Wilander**	**6**	**6**
Q	(United States) M Washington	0	2
(Australia) **S Draper**	6^{4}	**7**	**7^{7}**
(Russia) A Olhovskiy	**7^{7}**	5	6^{3}

Second round
4	(Russia) **Y Kafelnikov**	**6**	6^{6}	**7^{10}**
(Australia) M Philippoussis	4	**7^{8}**	6^{8}
Q	(Netherlands) R Krajicek	6^{7}	1^{r}
(New Zealand) **B Steven**	**7^{9}**	3
11	(Sweden) S Edberg	**6**	3	4
(Sweden) **M Wilander**	3	**6**	**6**
(Australia) S Draper	5	1
6	(South Africa) **W Ferreira**	**7**	**6**

Third round
4	(Russia) **Y Kafelnikov**	**6**	1	**6**
(New Zealand) B Steven	4	**6**	4
(Sweden) **M Wilander**	**6**	**6**
6	(South Africa) W Ferreira	3	2

Quarterfinals
4	(Russia) Y Kafelnikov	5	6^{4}
(Sweden) **M Wilander**	**7**	**7^{7}**

=== Bottom half ===
==== Section 3 ====
First round
(United Kingdom) G Rusedski	6^{2}	3
Q	(United States) **M Joyce**	**7^{7}**	**6**
Q	(Australia) **J Morgan**	4	**6**	**6**
(Czech Republic) M Damm	**6**	3	3
(Romania) A Voinea	0	2
12	(Sweden) **T Enqvist**	**6**	**6**
13	(United States) **T Martin**	**6**	**6**
(France) O Delaître	4	4
(Spain) J Burillo	5	1
(Zimbabwe) **B Black**	**7**	**6**
(United States) P McEnroe	3	6^{7}
(Czech Republic) **P Korda**	**6**	**7^{9}**

Second round
5/WC	(Croatia) **G Ivanišević**	**6**	3	**6**
Q	(United States) M Joyce	4	**6**	3
Q	(Australia) J Morgan	4	4
12	(Sweden) **T Enqvist**	**6**	**6**
13	(United States) **T Martin**	**6**	**6**
(Zimbabwe) B Black	3	1
(Czech Republic) P Korda	5	1
3	(United States) **M Chang**	**7**	**6**

Third round
5/WC	(Croatia) G Ivanišević	**7^{7}**	6^{3}	5
12	(Sweden) **T Enqvist**	6^{2}	**7^{7}**	**7**
13	(United States) T Martin	3	2
3	(United States) **M Chang**	**6**	**6**

Quarterfinals
12	(Sweden) **T Enqvist**	**6**	**6**
3	(United States) M Chang	3	4

==== Section 4 ====
First round
(Australia) M Tebbutt	3	4
(Australia) **P Rafter**	**6**	**6**
(Canada) **S Lareau**	**6**	**6**
WC	(Canada) G Connell	4	3
WC	(Canada) D Nestor	6^{1}	4
10	(United States) **J Courier**	**7^{7}**	**6**
15	(Australia) **J Stoltenberg**	**6**	**6**
(France) L Roux	4	4
(United States) R Reneberg	5	3
(Colombia) **M Hadad**	**7**	**6**
(Switzerland) J Hlasek	6^{4}	**6**	3
(United States) **J Stark**	**7^{7}**	3	**6**

Second round
7	(Germany) **M Stich**	**7^{7}**	**7**
(Australia) P Rafter	6^{5}	5
(Canada) S Lareau	4	3
10	(United States) **J Courier**	**6**	**6**
15	(Australia) J Stoltenberg	**6**	6^{4}	5
(Colombia) **M Hadad**	4	**7^{7}**	**7**
(United States) J Stark	3	**6**	4
2	(United States) **P Sampras**	**6**	4	**6**

Third round
7	(Germany) **M Stich**	**6**	**6**
10	(United States) J Courier	3	2
(Colombia) M Hadad	2	3
2	(United States) **P Sampras**	**6**	**6**

Quarterfinals
7	(Germany) M Stich	6^{3}	2
2	(United States) **P Sampras**	**7^{7}**	**6**
