= 1995 Italian Open – Women's doubles =

Women's doubles
- 1995 Italian Open
- 1994 Champions: (United States) Gigi Fernandez; (Belarus) Natasha Zvereva

Final
- Champions: (United States) Gigi Fernandez; (Belarus) Natasha Zvereva
- Runners-up: (Spain) Conchita Martínez; (Argentina) Patricia Tarabini
- Score: 3–6, 7–6^{(7–3)}, 6–4

Details
- Draw: 28
- Seeds: 8

Events
| Singles | men | women |
| Doubles | men | women |
| ← 1994 · | Italian Open | · 1996 → |

Gigi Fernandez and Natasha Zvereva were the defending champions and won in the final 3–6, 7–6^{(7–3)}, 6–4 against Conchita Martínez and Patricia Tarabini.

== Seeds ==
Champion seeds are indicated in bold text while text in italics indicates the round in which those seeds were eliminated. The top four seeded teams received byes into the second round.

1. (United States) **Gigi Fernández** / (Belarus) **Natasha Zvereva (champions)**
2. (United States) Meredith McGrath / (Spain) Arantxa Sánchez Vicario (quarterfinals)
3. (Argentina) Inés Gorrochategui / (Argentina) Gabriela Sabatini (quarterfinals)
4. (Australia) Nicole Bradtke / (United States) Mary Joe Fernández (semifinals)
5. (South Africa) Elna Reinach / (Romania) Irina Spîrlea (quarterfinals)
6. (Spain) Conchita Martínez / (Argentina) Patricia Tarabini (final)
7. (Italy) Laura Golarsa / (Netherlands) Caroline Vis (semifinals)
8. (Czech Republic) Helena Suková / (France) Nathalie Tauziat (second round)

== Draw ==
=== Key ===
- Q = Qualifier
- WC = Wild card
- LL = Lucky loser
- Alt = Alternate
- ITF = ITF entry
- PR = Protected ranking
- SR = Special ranking
- SE = Special exempt
- JE = Junior exempt
- JR = Junior Accelerator Programme entrant
- CO = College Accelerator Programme entrant
- NG = Next Gen Accelerator Program entrant
- w/o = Walkover
- r = Retired
- d = Defaulted

=== Finals ===
Final

1
- (United States) **Gigi Fernández**
- (Belarus) **Natasha Zvereva**
3
**7**
**6**

6
- (Spain) Conchita Martínez
- (Argentina) Patricia Tarabini
**6**
6
4

=== Top half ===
First round

Second round

Quarterfinals

Semifinals

1
- (United States) **G Fernández**
- (Belarus) **N Zvereva**
**6**
**6**

- (Brazil) L Tella
- (Brazil) A Vieira
2
**6**
5

WC
- (Italy) A Serra Zanetti
- (Italy) M P Zavagli
2
2

WC
- (Italy) **A Serra Zanetti**
- (Italy) **M P Zavagli**
**6**
3
**7**

1
- (United States) **G Fernández**
- (Belarus) **N Zvereva**
6
**6**
**6**

- (Russia) T Panova
- (Paraguay) L Schaerer
5
6

5
- (South Africa) E Reinach
- (Romania) I Spîrlea
**7**
4
2

- (Italy) **L Garrone**
- (United States) **M Tu**
**7**
**7**

- (Italy) L Garrone
- (United States) M Tu
3
0

- (Italy) A Canepa
- (Italy) G Casoni
2
4

5
- (South Africa) **E Reinach**
- (Romania) **I Spîrlea**
**6**
**6**

5
- (South Africa) **E Reinach**
- (Romania) **I Spîrlea**
**6**
**6**

1
- (United States) **G Fernández**
- (Belarus) **N Zvereva**
**6**
2
**6**

4
- (Australia) N Bradtke
- (United States) M J Fernández
2
**6**
2

4
- (Australia) **N Bradtke**
- (United States) **M J Fernández**
**7**
**6**

- (Japan) **N Kijimuta**
- (France) **S Testud**
**7**
**7**

- (Japan) N Kijimuta
- (France) S Testud
5
3

- (Italy) S Attili
- (Italy) E Savoldi
5
6

4
- (Australia) **N Bradtke**
- (United States) **M J Fernández**
**6**
**6**

- (Italy) **F Perfetti**
- (Italy) **G Pizzichini**
4
**6**
**6**

- (Italy) F Perfetti
- (Italy) G Pizzichini
1
4

- (Italy) S Farina
- (Austria) P Schwarz
**6**
3
3

- (Italy) **F Perfetti**
- (Italy) **G Pizzichini**
3
**7**
**6**

- (Spain) S Ramón-Cortés
- (Spain) C Torrens Valero
4
1

8
- (Czech Republic) H Suková
- (France) N Tauziat
**6**
5
4

8
- (Czech Republic) **H Suková**
- (France) **N Tauziat**
**6**
**6**

=== Bottom half ===
First round

Second round

Quarterfinals

Semifinals

7
- (Italy) **L Golarsa**
- (Netherlands) **C Vis**
**6**
**6**

- (Argentina) B Fulco-Villella
- (Spain) V Ruano-Pascual
2
1

7
- (Italy) **L Golarsa**
- (Netherlands) **C Vis**
**w/o**

- (South Africa) **J Kruger**
- (Croatia) **I Majoli**
**7**
**7**

- (South Africa) J Kruger
- (Croatia) I Majoli

- (Italy) S Cecchini
- (France) I Demongeot
5
6

7
- (Italy) **L Golarsa**
- (Netherlands) **C Vis**
**6**
4
**6**

- (United States) D Graham
- (Canada) J Hetherington
2
**6**
2

3
- (Argentina) I Gorrochategui
- (Argentina) G Sabatini
4
**6**
2

- (Romania) **R Dragomir**
- (United States) **A Grossman**
**6**
1
**6**

- (Romania) R Dragomir
- (United States) A Grossman
4
**6**
6

3
- (Argentina) **I Gorrochategui**
- (Argentina) **G Sabatini**
**6**
3
**7**

7
- (Italy) L Golarsa
- (Netherlands) C Vis
2
3

6
- (Spain) **C Martínez**
- (Argentina) **P Tarabini**
**6**
**6**

6
- (Spain) **C Martínez**
- (Argentina) **P Tarabini**
**6**
**6**

- (Slovakia) K Habšudová
- (Slovakia) R Zrubáková
2
2

6
- (Spain) **C Martínez**
- (Argentina) **P Tarabini**
**6**
**6**

- (Argentina) **M Paz**
- (United States) **S Stafford**
4
**6**
**6**

- (Argentina) M Paz
- (United States) S Stafford
0
2

WC
- (Italy) E Brusati
- (Italy) C Salvi
**6**
4
1

6
- (Spain) **C Martínez**
- (Argentina) **P Tarabini**
**7**
**6**

- (South Africa) **A Coetzer**
- (South Africa) **M de Swardt**
**6**
**7**

2
- (United States) M McGrath
- (Spain) A Sánchez Vicario
5
2

- (France) A Dechaume-Balleret
- (Argentina) F Labat
2
5

- (South Africa) A Coetzer
- (South Africa) M de Swardt
5
2

2
- (United States) **M McGrath**
- (Spain) **A Sánchez Vicario**
**7**
**6**
