= 1995 Canadian Open – Women's doubles =

Women's doubles
- 1995 Canadian Open

Final
- Champions: (Argentina) Gabriela Sabatini (Netherlands) Brenda Schultz-McCarthy
- Runners-up: (Switzerland) Martina Hingis (Croatia) Iva Majoli
- Score: 4–6, 6–0, 6–3

Details
- Draw: 28
- Seeds: 8

Events
Singles	men	women
Doubles	men	women
- Canadian Open

Meredith McGrath and Arantxa Sánchez Vicario were the defending champions, but competed this year with different partners. McGrath teamed up with Larisa Neiland and lost in semifinals to Gabriela Sabatini and Brenda Schultz-McCarthy, while Sánchez Vicario teamed up with Jana Novotná and also lost in semifinals to Martina Hingis and Iva Majoli.

Gabriela Sabatini and Brenda Schultz-McCarthy won the title by defeating Martina Hingis and Iva Majoli 4–6, 6–0, 6–3 in the final.

== Seeds ==
The first four seeds received a bye into the second round. Since seeds No. 4 withdrew from the tournament, seeds No. 9 took their place.

1. (Czech Republic) Jana Novotná / (Spain) Arantxa Sánchez Vicario (semifinals)
2. (United States) Meredith McGrath / (Latvia) Larisa Neiland (semifinals, retired)
3. (Argentina) Gabriela Sabatini / (Netherlands) Brenda Schultz-McCarthy (champions)
4. (United States) ~~Patty Fendick~~ / (United States) ~~Mary Joe Fernández~~ (withdrew)
5. (South Africa) Elna Reinach / (Romania) Irina Spîrlea (second round)
6. (Australia) Nicole Bradtke / (Australia) Rennae Stubbs (second round)
7. (South Africa) Amanda Coetzer / (France) Nathalie Tauziat (second round)
8. (Russia) Elena Makarova / (Russia) Eugenia Maniokova (second round)
9. (Japan) Kyōko Nagatsuka / (Canada) Rene Simpson (quarterfinals)

== Draw ==
Key

- Q = Qualifier
- WC = Wild card
- LL = Lucky loser
- Alt = Alternate
- ITF = ITF entry
- PR = Protected ranking
- SR = Special ranking
- SE = Special exempt
- JE = Junior exempt
- JR = Junior Accelerator Programme entrant
- CO = College Accelerator Programme entrant
- NG = Next Gen Accelerator Program entrant
- w/o = Walkover
- r = Retired
- d = Defaulted

=== Finals ===
Semifinals
1	(Czech Republic) Jana Novotná (Spain) Arantxa Sánchez Vicario	3	6	5
(Switzerland) Martina Hingis (Croatia) Iva Majoli	6	3	7
3	(Argentina) Gabriela Sabatini (Netherlands) Brenda Schultz-McCarthy	6	3
2	(United States) Meredith McGrath (Latvia) Larisa Neiland	3	1^{r}

Final
(Switzerland) Martina Hingis (Croatia) Iva Majoli	6	0	3
3	(Argentina) Gabriela Sabatini (Netherlands) Brenda Schultz-McCarthy	4	6	6

=== Top half ===
First round
(Canada) J Hetherington (Australia) K Radford	6	6
(France) S Amiach (France) I Demongeot	1	1
(Australia) R McQuillan (Germany) C Porwik	6	6
(Argentina) M Paz (United States) S Stafford	3	0
(Sweden) Å Carlsson (Canada) C Delisle	2	3
8	(Russia) E Makarova (Russia) E Maniokova	6	6
(Germany) A Huber (Germany) C Singer	1	6	7
(Indonesia) Y Basuki (Italy) S Farina	6	4	5
(Switzerland) M Hingis (Croatia) I Majoli	6	6
(Belgium) S Appelmans (Netherlands) M Oremans	4	2
(Canada) P Hy-Boulais (Argentina) F Labat	5	2
6	(Australia) N Bradtke (Australia) R Stubbs	7	6

Second round
1	(Czech Republic) J Novotná (Spain) A Sánchez Vicario	0	6	6
(Canada) J Hetherington (Australia) K Radford	6	4	4
(Australia) R McQuillan (Germany) C Porwik	6	7
8	(Russia) E Makarova (Russia) E Maniokova	1	5
9	(Japan) K Nagatsuka (Canada) R Simpson	6^{4}	7^{8}	6
(Germany) A Huber (Germany) C Singer	7^{7}	6^{6}	1
(Switzerland) M Hingis (Croatia) I Majoli	5	6	6
6	(Australia) N Bradtke (Australia) R Stubbs	7	4	4

Quarterfinals
1	(Czech Republic) J Novotná (Spain) A Sánchez Vicario	6	6
(Australia) R McQuillan (Germany) C Porwik	2	2
9	(Japan) K Nagatsuka (Canada) R Simpson	5	6^{3}
(Switzerland) M Hingis (Croatia) I Majoli	7	7^{7}

Semifinals
1	(Czech Republic) J Novotná (Spain) A Sánchez Vicario	3	6	5
(Switzerland) M Hingis (Croatia) I Majoli	6	3	7

=== Bottom half ===
First round
7	(South Africa) A Coetzer (France) N Tauziat	6	6
WC	(Canada) C Bassett-Seguso (Canada) M Drake	1	3
(Slovakia) K Habšudová (United States) T Whitlinger-Jones	2	2
(United States) L McNeil (Czech Republic) H Suková	6	6
Q	(Spain) V Ruano Pascual (Argentina) P Suárez	3	0
(United States) A Frazier (United States) K Po	6	6
5	(South Africa) E Reinach (Romania) I Spîrlea	6	6
(Japan) Y Kamio (Japan) N Kijimuta	4	4
WC	(Canada) S Jeyaseelan (Canada) J Nejedly	7	6
Q	(France) C Dhenin (France) L Ghirardi	5	3
LL	(Italy) R Grande (South Africa) J Kruger	1	0
(France) A Dechaume-Balleret (France) S Testud	6	6

Second round
7	(South Africa) A Coetzer (France) N Tauziat	4	3
(United States) L McNeil (Czech Republic) H Suková	6	6
(United States) A Frazier (United States) K Po	6^{3}	3
3	(Argentina) G Sabatini (Netherlands) B Schultz-McCarthy	7^{7}	6
5	(South Africa) E Reinach (Romania) I Spîrlea	4	6	1
WC	(Canada) S Jeyaseelan (Canada) J Nejedly	6	4	6
(France) A Dechaume-Balleret (France) S Testud	6^{3}	2
2	(United States) M McGrath (Latvia) L Neiland	7^{7}	6

Quarterfinals
(United States) L McNeil (Czech Republic) H Suková	3	5
3	(Argentina) G Sabatini (Netherlands) B Schultz-McCarthy	6	7
WC	(Canada) S Jeyaseelan (Canada) J Nejedly	1	1
2	(United States) M McGrath (Latvia) L Neiland	6	6

Semifinals
3	(Argentina) G Sabatini (Netherlands) B Schultz-McCarthy	6	3
2	(United States) M McGrath (Latvia) L Neiland	3	1^{r}
