= 1995 Canadian Open – Men's doubles =

Men's doubles
- 1995 Canadian Open

Final
- Champions: (Russia) Yevgeny Kafelnikov (Russia) Andrei Olhovskiy
- Runners-up: (United States) Brian MacPhie (Australia) Sandon Stolle
- Score: 6–2, 6–2

Details
- Draw: 28
- Seeds: 8

Events
Singles	men	women
Doubles	men	women
- Canadian Open

Byron Black and Jonathan Stark were the defending champions, but lost in second round to Jamie Morgan and Michael Tebbutt.

Yevgeny Kafelnikov and Andrei Olhovskiy won the title by defeating Brian MacPhie and Sandon Stolle 6–2, 6–2 in the final.

== Seeds ==
The first four seeds received a bye into the second round.

1. (Canada) Grant Connell / (United States) Patrick Galbraith (semifinals)
2. (Zimbabwe) Byron Black / (United States) Jonathan Stark (second round)
3. (United States) Jim Grabb / (United States) Patrick McEnroe (second round)
4. (Russia) Yevgeny Kafelnikov / (Russia) Andrei Olhovskiy (champions)
5. (The Bahamas) Mark Knowles / (Canada) Daniel Nestor (second round)
6. (Czech Republic) Cyril Suk / (Czech Republic) Daniel Vacek (second round)
7. (United States) Alex O'Brien / (United States) Richey Reneberg (first round)
8. (South Africa) Wayne Ferreira / (New Zealand) Brett Steven (first round)

== Draw ==
Key

- Q = Qualifier
- WC = Wild card
- LL = Lucky loser
- Alt = Alternate
- ITF = ITF entry
- PR = Protected ranking
- SR = Special ranking
- SE = Special exempt
- JE = Junior exempt
- JR = Junior Accelerator Programme entrant
- CO = College Accelerator Programme entrant
- NG = Next Gen Accelerator Program entrant
- w/o = Walkover
- r = Retired
- d = Defaulted

=== Finals ===
Semifinals
1	(Canada) Grant Connell (United States) Patrick Galbraith	3	3
4	(Russia) Yevgeny Kafelnikov (Russia) Andrei Olhovskiy	6	6
(United States) Brian MacPhie (Australia) Sandon Stolle	6	3	6
(Australia) Mark Philippoussis (Australia) Patrick Rafter	3	6	2

Final
4	(Russia) Yevgeny Kafelnikov (Russia) Andrei Olhovskiy	6	6
(United States) Brian MacPhie (Australia) Sandon Stolle	2	2

=== Top half ===
First round
Q	(United States) D Bowen (United States) Thomas Orvald	4	6
(South Africa) D Adams (France) O Delaître	6	7
(United States) S Cannon (United States) J Tarango	4	6	6
WC	(Canada) B Kokavec (Canada) J Robichaud	6	2	2
(South Africa) M Barnard (South Africa) B Haygarth	7	6
8	(South Africa) W Ferreira (New Zealand) B Steven	5	4
WC	(Netherlands) R Krajicek (Germany) M Stich	7	4	7
(United States) D Johnson (United States) K Thorne	6	6	6
WC	(Canada) A Chang (Canada) A Sznajder	2	2
(Switzerland) J Hlasek (United States) D Wheaton	6	6
(United States) K Jones (United States) D Pate	4	4
5	(The Bahamas) M Knowles (Canada) D Nestor	6	6

Second round
1	(Canada) G Connell (United States) P Galbraith	6	6
(South Africa) D Adams (France) O Delaître	2	4
(United States) S Cannon (United States) J Tarango	7	6
(South Africa) M Barnard (South Africa) B Haygarth	6	3
4	(Russia) Y Kafelnikov (Russia) A Olhovskiy	w/o
WC	(Netherlands) R Krajicek (Germany) M Stich
(Switzerland) J Hlasek (United States) D Wheaton	6	6
5	(The Bahamas) M Knowles (Canada) D Nestor	3	4

Quarterfinals
1	(Canada) G Connell (United States) P Galbraith	6	6
(United States) S Cannon (United States) J Tarango	3	2
4	(Russia) Y Kafelnikov (Russia) A Olhovskiy	7	6
(Switzerland) J Hlasek (United States) D Wheaton	6	4

Semifinals
1	(Canada) G Connell (United States) P Galbraith	3	3
4	(Russia) Y Kafelnikov (Russia) A Olhovskiy	6	6

=== Bottom half ===
First round
6	(Czech Republic) C Suk (Czech Republic) D Vacek	6	6
(United States) J Courier (Croatia) G Ivanišević	4	0
(Australia) P Kilderry (United States) K Kinnear	2	7	6
(United States) R Leach (United States) S Melville	6	6	3
(United States) B MacPhie (Australia) S Stolle	6	6
(Czech Republic) M Damm (Czech Republic) P Korda	3	4
7	(United States) A O'Brien (United States) R Reneberg	4	4
(Australia) M Philippoussis (Australia) P Rafter	6	6
(Canada) S Lareau (Canada) S Leblanc	6	3	4
(United Kingdom) G Rusedski (Kenya) P Wekesa	4	6	6
Q	(Australia) J Morgan (Australia) M Tebbutt	4	6	6
WC	(United States) T Martin (United States) P Sampras	6	1	4

Second round
6	(Czech Republic) C Suk (Czech Republic) D Vacek	4	6	6
(Australia) P Kilderry (United States) K Kinnear	6	3	7
(United States) B MacPhie (Australia) S Stolle	6	3	6
3	(United States) J Grabb (United States) P McEnroe	4	6	4
(Australia) M Philippoussis (Australia) P Rafter	3	6	7
(United Kingdom) G Rusedski (Kenya) P Wekesa	6	4	6
Q	(Australia) J Morgan (Australia) M Tebbutt	6	6	7
2	(Zimbabwe) B Black (United States) J Stark	2	7	6

Quarterfinals
(Australia) P Kilderry (United States) K Kinnear	4	4
(United States) B MacPhie (Australia) S Stolle	6	6
(Australia) M Philippoussis (Australia) P Rafter	6	6
Q	(Australia) J Morgan (Australia) M Tebbutt	4	4

Semifinals
(United States) B MacPhie (Australia) S Stolle	6	3	6
(Australia) M Philippoussis (Australia) P Rafter	3	6	2
