= 1995 Italian Open – Women's singles =

Women's singles
- 1995 Italian Open

Final
- Champion: (Spain) Conchita Martínez
- Runner-up: (Spain) Arantxa Sánchez Vicario
- Score: 6–3, 6–1

Details
- Draw: 56
- Seeds: 16

Events
Singles	men	women
Doubles	men	women
← 1994 ·	Italian Open	· 1996 →

Two-time defending champion Conchita Martínez defeated Arantxa Sánchez Vicario in the final, 6–3, 6–1 to win the women's singles tennis title at the 1995 Italian Open.

== Seeds ==
A champion seed is indicated in bold text while text in italics indicates the round in which that seed was eliminated. The top eight seeds received a bye to the second round.

1. (Spain) Arantxa Sánchez Vicario (final)
2. (France) Mary Pierce (semifinals)
3. (Spain) **Conchita Martínez (champion)**
4. (Argentina) Gabriela Sabatini (third round)
5. (Germany) Anke Huber (third round)
6. (United States) Mary Joe Fernández (quarterfinals)
7. (Netherlands) Brenda Schultz (second round)
8. (Croatia) Iva Majoli (quarterfinals)
9. (Japan) Naoko Sawamatsu (second round)
10. (South Africa) Amanda Coetzer (third round)
11. (Argentina) Inés Gorrochategui (first round)
12. (Austria) Judith Wiesner (third round)
13. (Czech Republic) Helena Suková (semifinals)
14. (Slovakia) Karina Habšudová (third round)
15. (Romania) Irina Spîrlea (third round)
16. (France) Nathalie Tauziat (third round)

== Draw ==
=== Key ===
- Q = Qualifier
- WC = Wild card
- LL = Lucky loser
- Alt = Alternate
- ITF = ITF entry
- PR = Protected ranking
- SR = Special ranking
- SE = Special exempt
- JE = Junior exempt
- JR = Junior Accelerator Programme entrant
- CO = College Accelerator Programme entrant
- NG = Next Gen Accelerator Program entrant
- w/o = Walkover
- r = Retired
- d = Defaulted

=== Finals ===
Semifinals
1	(Spain) **Arantxa Sánchez Vicario**	**6**	**6**
13	(Czech Republic) Helena Suková	3	0
3	(Spain) **Conchita Martínez**	**6**	**6**
WC/2	(France) Mary Pierce	3	3

Final
1	(Spain) Arantxa Sánchez Vicario	3	1
3	(Spain) **Conchita Martínez**	**6**	**6**

=== Top half ===
==== Section 1 ====
First round
(France) I Demongeot	5	3
Q	(Spain) **V Ruano-Pascual**	**7**	**6**
(Slovakia) **R Zrubáková**	**6**	**6**
(United States) A Grossman	4	3
WC	(Italy) F Lubiani	2	**6**	3
10	(South Africa) **A Coetzer**	**6**	1	**6**
16	(France) **N Tauziat**	**6**	**6**
(Argentina) F Labat	3	3
(South Africa) M de Swardt	5	2
Q	(Spain) **S Ramón-Cortés**	**7**	**6**
(United States) **S Stafford**	**6**	**6**
(United States) D Graham	2	3

Second round
1	(Spain) **A Sánchez Vicario**	6	**6**	**6**
Q	(Spain) V Ruano-Pascual	**7**	2	2
(Slovakia) R Zrubáková	3	1
10	(South Africa) **A Coetzer**	**6**	**6**
16	(France) **N Tauziat**	**6**	**7**
Q	(Spain) S Ramón-Cortés	3	5
(United States) **S Stafford**	**6**	**6**
7	(Netherlands) B Schultz	4	2

Third round
1	(Spain) **A Sánchez Vicario**	**6**	**6**
10	(South Africa) A Coetzer	3	2
16	(France) N Tauziat	6	2
(United States) **S Stafford**	**7**	**6**

Quarterfinals
1	(Spain) **A Sánchez Vicario**	**6**	**6**
(United States) S Stafford	1	3

==== Section 2 ====
First round
Q	(Italy) **F Perfetti**	**6**	**6**
(France) A Dechaume-Balleret	3	2
(Italy) **S Cecchini**	6	**6**	**6**
(South Africa) E Reinach	**7**	4	4
(Australia) N Bradtke	**6**	1	5
13	(Czech Republic) **H Suková**	1	**6**	**7**
11	(Argentina) I Gorrochategui	3	2
Q	(Slovenia) **B Mulej**	**6**	**6**
(South Africa) **J Kruger**	**6**	**7**
(Romania) R Dragomir	3	5
(Germany) **S Hack**	**7**	**6**
(United States) J Watanabe	5	4

Second round
4	(Argentina) **G Sabatini**	**6**	**7**
Q	(Italy) F Perfetti	1	5
(Italy) S Cecchini	1	3
13	(Czech Republic) **H Suková**	**6**	**6**
Q	(Slovenia) B Mulej	2	1
(South Africa) **J Kruger**	**6**	**6**
(Germany) S Hack	2	**7**	3
5	(Germany) **A Huber**	**6**	5	**6**

Third round
4	(Argentina) G Sabatini	**6**	6	6
13	(Czech Republic) **H Suková**	2	**7**	**7**
(South Africa) **J Kruger**	**6**	**7**
5	(Germany) A Huber	4	6

Quarterfinals
13	(Czech Republic) **H Suková**	**6**	**6**
(South Africa) J Kruger	0	3

=== Bottom half ===
==== Section 3 ====
First round
(Czech Republic) **R Bobková**	**7**	**6**
(Argentina) P Tarabini	6	1
(Germany) S Frankl	2	1
(United States) **M McGrath**	**6**	**6**
(Bulgaria) E Pampoulova	0	**6**	0
9	(Japan) **N Sawamatsu**	**6**	4	**6**
14	(Slovakia) **K Habšudová**	**6**	**6**
(France) S Testud	4	4
(Italy) **N Baudone**	**6**	**6**
Q	(Italy) F Bonsignori	2	4
(Italy) **A Serra Zanetti**	**6**	**6**
(Belgium) L Courtois	4	1

Second round
6	(United States) **M J Fernández**	**6**	**6**
(Czech Republic) R Bobková	4	3
(United States) **M McGrath**	6	**6**	**6**
9	(Japan) N Sawamatsu	**7**	3	3
14	(Slovakia) **K Habšudová**	1	**6**	**6**
(Italy) N Baudone	**6**	1	2
(Italy) A Serra Zanetti	2	**6**	1
3	(Spain) **C Martínez**	**6**	1	**6**

Third round
6	(United States) **M J Fernández**	**6**	**6**
(United States) M McGrath	1	1
14	(Slovakia) K Habšudová	3	3
3	(Spain) **C Martínez**	**6**	**6**

Quarterfinals
6	(United States) M J Fernández	4	3
3	(Spain) **C Martínez**	**6**	**6**

==== Section 4 ====
First round
Q	(Italy) **G Boschiero**	**7**	**6**
LL	(Argentina) M Paz	6	3
(Mexico) **A Gavaldón**	**6**	**6**
(United States) S Cacic	2	4
(Argentina) B Fulco-Villella	1	2
12	(Austria) **J Wiesner**	**6**	**6**
15	(Romania) **I Spîrlea**	**6**	**6**
WC	(Italy) L Golarsa	3	1
Q	(Argentina) **M-J Gaidano**	**7**	**6**
(Austria) P Schwarz	6	2
Q	(Canada) **S Jeyaseelan**	**6**	**6**
(Italy) S Farina	2	2

Second round
8	(Croatia) **I Majoli**	**6**	**6**
Q	(Italy) G Boschiero	1	1
(Mexico) A Gavaldón	**7**	5	4
12	(Austria) **J Wiesner**	6	**7**	**6**
15	(Romania) **I Spîrlea**	**6**	**6**
Q	(Argentina) M-J Gaidano	3	4
Q	(Canada) S Jeyaseelan	1	2
WC/2	(France) **M Pierce**	**6**	**6**

Third round
8	(Croatia) **I Majoli**	4	**7**	**7**
12	(Austria) J Wiesner	**6**	6	6
15	(Romania) I Spîrlea	2	0
WC/2	(France) **M Pierce**	**6**	**6**

Quarterfinals
8	(Croatia) I Majoli	4	**6**	6
WC/2	(France) **M Pierce**	**6**	2	**7**
