= 1995 Canadian Open – Women's singles =

Women's singles
- 1995 Canadian Open

Final
- Champion: (United States) Monica Seles
- Runner-up: (South Africa) Amanda Coetzer
- Score: 6–0, 6–1

Details
- Draw: 56
- Seeds: 16

Events
Singles	men	women
Doubles	men	women
- Canadian Open

Monica Seles defeated Amanda Coetzer in the final, 6–0, 6–1 to win the women's singles tennis title at the 1995 Canadian Open. It was Seles' first tournament back after being stabbed during a match in April 1993.

Arantxa Sánchez Vicario was the defending champion, but lost in the third round to Helena Suková.

== Seeds ==
The top eight seeds receive a bye into the second round.

1. (Germany) Steffi Graf (second round)
1. (United States) Monica Seles (champion)
3. (Spain) Arantxa Sánchez Vicario (third round)
4. (Czech Republic) Jana Novotná (semifinals)
5. (France) Mary Pierce (quarterfinals)
6. (Argentina) Gabriela Sabatini (semifinals)
7. (Germany) Anke Huber (quarterfinals)
8. (Croatia) Iva Majoli (quarterfinals)
9. (United States) Mary Joe Fernández (withdrew due to endometriosis)
10. (United States) Amy Frazier (third round)
11. (Netherlands) Brenda Schultz-McCarthy (withdrew)
12. (France) Nathalie Tauziat (third round)
13. (Czech Republic) Helena Suková (quarterfinals)
14. (Switzerland) Martina Hingis (third round)
15. (Austria) Judith Wiesner (third round)
16. (Romania) Irina Spîrlea (third round)
17. (Belgium) Sabine Appelmans (third round)
18. (Slovakia) Karina Habšudová (first round)

== Draw ==
Key

- Q = Qualifier
- WC = Wild card
- LL = Lucky loser
- Alt = Alternate
- ITF = ITF entry
- PR = Protected ranking
- SR = Special ranking
- SE = Special exempt
- JE = Junior exempt
- JR = Junior Accelerator Programme entrant
- CO = College Accelerator Programme entrant
- NG = Next Gen Accelerator Program entrant
- w/o = Walkover
- r = Retired
- d = Defaulted

=== Finals ===
Quarterfinals
(South Africa) Amanda Coetzer	6	5	6
5	(France) Mary Pierce	4	7	0
4	(Czech Republic) Jana Novotná	6	6
8	(Croatia) Iva Majoli	4	2
6	(Argentina) Gabriela Sabatini	6	6
13	(Czech Republic) Helena Suková	2	1
7	(Germany) Anke Huber	3	2
1/WC	(United States) Monica Seles	6	6

Semifinals
(South Africa) Amanda Coetzer	6	6
4	(Czech Republic) Jana Novotná	4	3
6	(Argentina) Gabriela Sabatini	1	0
1/WC	(United States) Monica Seles	6	6

Final
(South Africa) Amanda Coetzer	0	1
1/WC	(United States) Monica Seles	6	6

=== Top half ===
==== Section 1 ====
First round
Q	(Canada) V Webb	4	2
(South Africa) A Coetzer	6	6
(Israel) A Smashnova	3	3
Q	(Madagascar) D Randriantefy	6	6
WC	(United States) V Williams	4	6^{3}
17	(Belgium) S Appelmans	6	7^{7}
14	(Switzerland) M Hingis	4	6	7^{9}
(France) S Testud	6	3	6^{7}
(Latvia) L Neiland	2	0^{r}
(Argentina) F Labat	6	1
(Mexico) A Gavaldón	6	6
(Japan) M Endo	1	4

Second round
1	(Germany) S Graf	6	2	6^{6}
(South Africa) A Coetzer	3	6	7^{8}
Q	(Madagascar) D Randriantefy	1	1
17	(Belgium) S Appelmans	6	6
14	(Switzerland) M Hingis	6	6
(Argentina) F Labat	1	2
(Mexico) A Gavaldón	1	2
5	(France) M Pierce	6	6

Third round
(South Africa) A Coetzer	5	6	6
17	(Belgium) S Appelmans	7	3	1
14	(Switzerland) M Hingis	0	0
5	(France) M Pierce	6	6

Quarterfinals
(South Africa) A Coetzer	6	5	6
5	(France) M Pierce	4	7	0

==== Section 2 ====
First round
Q	(France) A Dechaume-Balleret	6^{6}	7^{7}	5
Q	(Finland) N Dahlman	7^{8}	6^{2}	3^{r}
(France) J Halard	7^{7}	6
(South Africa) E Reinach	6^{5}	2
(Russia) E Likhovtseva	7^{7}	4	2
15	(Austria) J Wiesner	6^{1}	6	6
10	(United States) A Frazier	6	6
LL	(Argentina) P Suárez	3	3
(Romania) R Dragomir	6	6
(Italy) S Farina	0	4
(United States) P Fendick	3	7	6
(Russia) E Makarova	6	5	3

Second round
4	(Czech Republic) J Novotná	6	6
Q	(France) A Dechaume-Balleret	3	2
(France) J Halard	0	1
15	(Austria) J Wiesner	6	6
10	(United States) A Frazier	6	6
(Romania) R Dragomir	3	1
(United States) P Fendick	2	2
8	(Croatia) I Majoli	6	6

Third round
4	(Czech Republic) J Novotná	6	6
15	(Austria) J Wiesner	3	4
10	(United States) A Frazier	0	2
8	(Croatia) I Majoli	6	6

Quarterfinals
4	(Czech Republic) J Novotná	6	6
8	(Croatia) I Majoli	4	2

=== Bottom half ===
==== Section 3 ====
First round
(France) L Ghirardi	5	6	6
(Spain) V Ruano Pascual	7	3	1
(Japan) Y Kamio	6	4	6
(Germany) B Rittner	3	6	0
(Sweden) Å Carlsson	7	6
18	(Slovakia) K Habšudová	5	2
13	(Czech Republic) H Suková	6	6
(United States) S Stafford	3	4
(Japan) K Nagatsuka	6	6
(South Africa) J Kruger	4	2
Q	(Italy) N Baudone	6^{7}	6	1
(Canada) P Hy-Boulais	7^{9}	1	6

Second round
6	(Argentina) G Sabatini	6	6
(France) L Ghirardi	1	2
(Japan) Y Kamio	0	6	6
(Sweden) Å Carlsson	6	1	4
13	(Czech Republic) H Suková	0	6	6
(Japan) K Nagatsuka	6	0	4
(Canada) P Hy-Boulais	4	3
3	(Spain) A Sánchez Vicario	6	6

Third round
6	(Argentina) G Sabatini	6	6
(Japan) Y Kamio	1	0
13	(Czech Republic) H Suková	7	6
3	(Spain) A Sánchez Vicario	5	4

Quarterfinals
6	(Argentina) G Sabatini	6	6
13	(Czech Republic) H Suková	2	1

==== Section 4 ====
First round
(Australia) N Bradtke	6	7
Q	(United States) M McGrath	2	5
WC	(Canada) J Nejedly	3	6	6
(United States) T Whitlinger	6	4	3
(Netherlands) M Oremans	6^{2}	3
16	(Romania) I Spîrlea	7^{7}	6
12	(France) N Tauziat	6	1	7
Q	(United States) M Tu	1	6	5
(Indonesia) Y Basuki	7	5	3
(United States) L McNeil	5	7	6
LL	(United States) K Po	6	6
Q	(Australia) R Stubbs	4	1

Second round
7	(Germany) A Huber	6	6
(Australia) N Bradtke	4	3
WC	(Canada) J Nejedly	2	1
16	(Romania) I Spîrlea	6	6
12	(France) N Tauziat	7	6
(United States) L McNeil	5	3
LL	(United States) K Po	0	3
1/WC	(United States) M Seles	6	6

Third round
7	(Germany) A Huber	1	6	7
16	(Romania) I Spîrlea	6	3	5
12	(France) N Tauziat	2	2
1/WC	(United States) M Seles	6	6

Quarterfinals
7	(Germany) A Huber	3	2
1/WC	(United States) M Seles	6	6
