= 1995 Italian Open – Men's doubles =

Men's doubles
- 1995 Italian Open

Final
- Champions: (Czech Republic) Cyril Suk (Czech Republic) Daniel Vacek
- Runners-up: (Sweden) Jan Apell (Sweden) Jonas Björkman
- Score: 6–3, 6–4

Details
- Draw: 32
- Seeds: 8

Events
Singles	men	women
Doubles	men	women
← 1994 ·	Italian Open	· 1996 →

Yevgeny Kafelnikov and David Rikl were the defending champions, but none competed this year.

Cyril Suk and Daniel Vacek won the title by defeating Jan Apell and Jonas Björkman 6–3, 6–4 in the final.

== Seeds ==
1. (Netherlands) Jacco Eltingh / (Netherlands) Paul Haarhuis (first round)
2. (Canada) Grant Connell / (United States) Patrick Galbraith (second round)
3. (Zimbabwe) Byron Black / (Russia) Andrei Olhovskiy (first round)
4. (Sweden) Jan Apell / (Sweden) Jonas Björkman (final)
5. (United States) Jared Palmer / (United States) Richey Reneberg (first round)
6. (n/a)
7. (The Bahamas) Mark Knowles / (Canada) Daniel Nestor (second round)
8. (Czech Republic) Cyril Suk / (Czech Republic) Daniel Vacek (champions)

== Draw ==
=== Key ===
- Q = Qualifier
- WC = Wild card
- LL = Lucky loser
- Alt = Alternate
- ITF = ITF entry
- PR = Protected ranking
- SR = Special ranking
- SE = Special exempt
- JE = Junior exempt
- JR = Junior Accelerator Programme entrant
- CO = College Accelerator Programme entrant
- NG = Next Gen Accelerator Program entrant
- w/o = Walkover
- r = Retired
- d = Defaulted

=== Finals ===
Semifinals
8	(Czech Republic) Cyril Suk (Czech Republic) Daniel Vacek	6	6
(Spain) Tomás Carbonell (Netherlands) Jan Siemerink	3	3
4	(Sweden) Jan Apell (Sweden) Jonas Björkman	3	6	6
(South Africa) Lan Bale (South Africa) John-Laffnie de Jager	6	4	3

Final
8	(Czech Republic) Cyril Suk (Czech Republic) Daniel Vacek	6	6
4	(Sweden) Jan Apell (Sweden) Jonas Björkman	3	4

=== Top half ===
First round
1	(Netherlands) J Eltingh (Netherlands) P Haarhuis	5	4
(Australia) J Eagle (Australia) A Florent	7	6
(United States) R Leach (United States) S Melville	6	6
LL	(Uruguay) M Filippini (France) F Santoro	3	4
(Argentina) L Lobo (Spain) J Sánchez	6	6
(Czech Republic) V Flégl (Netherlands) S Noteboom	3	4
(Australia) D Macpherson (Australia) P Rafter	6	7	3
8	(Czech Republic) C Suk (Czech Republic) D Vacek	7	5	6
3	(Zimbabwe) B Black (Russia) A Olhovskiy	3	6	4
Q	(South Africa) M Barnard (United States) J Tarango	6	4	6
(United States) M Keil (Sweden) P Nyborg	6	6
WC	(Italy) C Brandi (Italy) S Pescosolido	3	4
(Germany) MK Goellner (Italy) D Nargiso	7	6
(United Kingdom) N Broad (South Africa) B Haygarth	5	1
(Spain) T Carbonell (Netherlands) J Siemerink	2	7	7
5	(United States) J Palmer (United States) R Reneberg	6	6	6

Second round
(Australia) J Eagle (Australia) A Florent	6	4
(United States) R Leach (United States) S Melville	7	6
(Argentina) L Lobo (Spain) J Sánchez	3	4
8	(Czech Republic) C Suk (Czech Republic) D Vacek	6	6
Q	(South Africa) M Barnard (United States) J Tarango	6	0	6
(United States) M Keil (Sweden) P Nyborg	3	6	3
(Germany) MK Goellner (Italy) D Nargiso	4	3
(Spain) T Carbonell (Netherlands) J Siemerink	6	6

Quarterfinals
(United States) R Leach (United States) S Melville	3	4
8	(Czech Republic) C Suk (Czech Republic) D Vacek	6	6
Q	(South Africa) M Barnard (United States) J Tarango	4	7	1
(Spain) T Carbonell (Netherlands) J Siemerink	6	6	6

Semifinals
8	(Czech Republic) C Suk (Czech Republic) D Vacek	6	6
(Spain) T Carbonell (Netherlands) J Siemerink	3	3

=== Bottom half ===
First round
LL	(Morocco) K Alami (United States) V Spadea	3	2
(Sweden) S Edberg (Czech Republic) P Korda	6	6
(Italy) A Gaudenzi (Croatia) G Ivanišević	6	1	6
(Australia) J Fitzgerald (South Africa) D Visser	4	6	3
(United States) S Davis (Belgium) L Pimek	7	6	3
Q	(Australia) R Fromberg (Australia) M Philippoussis	5	7	6
(Netherlands) T Nijssen (Netherlands) M Oosting	6	1
4	(Sweden) J Apell (Sweden) J Björkman	7	6
7	(The Bahamas) M Knowles (Canada) D Nestor	4	4
(Australia) W Arthurs (South Africa) E Ferreira	6	6
WC	(United States) T Martin (United States) MV Washington	6	6
(South Africa) G Muller (South Africa) P Norval	3	3
(South Africa) L Bale (South Africa) JL de Jager	7	6
WC	(Italy) C Caratti (Italy) R Furlan	6	3
(Czech Republic) M Damm (Czech Republic) K Nováček	3	4
2	(Canada) G Connell (United States) P Galbraith	6	6

Second round
(Sweden) S Edberg (Czech Republic) P Korda	1	6	6
(Italy) A Gaudenzi (Croatia) G Ivanišević	6	4	7
Q	(Australia) R Fromberg (Australia) M Philippoussis	2	4
4	(Sweden) J Apell (Sweden) J Björkman	6	6
(Australia) W Arthurs (South Africa) E Ferreira	6	3	2
WC	(United States) T Martin (United States) MV Washington	2	6	6
(South Africa) L Bale (South Africa) JL de Jager	6	6	6
2	(Canada) G Connell (United States) P Galbraith	7	3	4

Quarterfinals
(Italy) A Gaudenzi (Croatia) G Ivanišević	4	1
4	(Sweden) J Apell (Sweden) J Björkman	6	6
WC	(United States) T Martin (United States) MV Washington	4	7	4
(South Africa) L Bale (South Africa) JL de Jager	6	6	6

Semifinals
4	(Sweden) J Apell (Sweden) J Björkman	3	6	6
(South Africa) L Bale (South Africa) JL de Jager	6	4	3
