= 1995 Canadian Open (tennis) =

- Date: July 24–31 (M); August 13–20 (W)
- Edition: 106th
- Category: Championship Series, Single Week (M); Tier I (W)
- Draw: 64S / 32D
- Prize money: $1,545,000 (M) $806,250 (W)
- Surface: Hard / outdoor
- Location: Montreal, Quebec, Canada (M); Toronto, Ontario, Canada (W)

Champions

Men's singles
- (United States) Andre Agassi

Women's singles
- (United States) Monica Seles

Men's doubles
- (Russia) Yevgeny Kafelnikov / (Russia) Andrei Olhovskiy

Women's doubles
- (Netherlands) Brenda Schultz-McCarthy / (Argentina) Gabriela Sabatini
- Canadian Open

The 1995 Canadian Open, also known by its sponsored name Du Maurier Canadian Open, was a men's and women's professional tennis tournament played on outdoor hard courts that was part of the Championship Series, Single Week of the 1995 ATP Tour, and of Tier I of the 1995 WTA Tour. The men's event took place at the Jarry Stadium in Montreal, Quebec, Canada, from July 24 through July 31, 1995, and the women's event at the National Tennis Centre in Toronto, Ontario, Canada, from August 13 through August 20, 1995. First-seeded Andre Agassi, the defending champion, and Monica Seles won the singles titles. It was Seles' first tournament back after being stabbed during a match at the WTA Hamburg in April 1993.

== Finals ==
=== Men's singles ===
(United States) Andre Agassi defeated (United States) Pete Sampras, 3–6, 6–2, 6–3

- It was Andre Agassi's 5th title of the year and his 29th overall. It was his 2nd Masters title of the year and his 6th overall. It was his 3rd win at the event, also winning in 1992 and 1994.

=== Women's singles ===
(United States) Monica Seles defeated (South Africa) Amanda Coetzer, 6–0, 6–1

- It was Monica Seles' 1st title of the year and her 33rd overall. It was her 1st Tier I title of the year and her 5th overall.

=== Men's doubles ===
(Russia) Yevgeny Kafelnikov / (Russia) Andrei Olhovskiy defeated (United States) Brian MacPhie / (Australia) Sandon Stolle, 6–4, 6–4

=== Women's doubles ===
(Netherlands) Brenda Schultz-McCarthy / (Argentina) Gabriela Sabatini defeated (Switzerland) Martina Hingis / (Croatia) Iva Majoli 4–6, 6–0, 6–3

== See also ==
- Agassi–Sampras rivalry
