= 1995 WTA German Open =

- Date: 15–21 May
- Edition: 84th
- Category: Tier I
- Draw: 56S / 28D
- Prize money: $806,250
- Surface: Clay / outdoor
- Location: Berlin, Germany
- Venue: Rot-Weiss Tennis Club

Champions

Singles
- (Spain) Arantxa Sánchez Vicario

Doubles
- (South Africa) Amanda Coetzer (Argentina) Inés Gorrochategui
- WTA German Open

The 1995 WTA German Open was a women's tennis tournament played on outdoor clay courts at the Rot-Weiss Tennis Club in Berlin in Germany that was part of Tier I of the 1995 WTA Tour. It was the 84th edition of the tournament and was held from 15 May through 21 May 1995. First-seeded Arantxa Sánchez Vicario won the singles and earned $148,500 first-prize money.

== Finals ==
=== Singles ===
(Spain) Arantxa Sánchez Vicario defeated (Bulgaria) Magdalena Maleeva 6–4, 6–1

- It was Sánchez Vicario's 5th title of the year and the 62nd of her career.

=== Doubles ===
(South Africa) Amanda Coetzer / (Argentina) Inés Gorrochategui defeated (Argentina) Gabriela Sabatini / (Latvia) Larisa Savchenko 4–6, 7–6, 6–2

- It was Coetzer's 2nd title of the year and the 8th of her career. It was Gorrochategui's 2nd title of the year and the 6th of her career.

== Prize money ==
Event	W	F	SF	QF	Round of 16	Round of 32	Round of 64
Singles	$148,500	$59,500	$29,050	$14,590	$7,520	$4,005	$2,175
