= 1995 Italian Open (tennis) =

- Date: 15–22 May (men); 8–14 May (women)
- Edition: 52nd
- Category: ATP Super 9 (men); Tier I (women)
- Prize money: $1,750,000 (men) $806,250 (women)
- Surface: Clay / outdoor
- Location: Rome, Italy
- Venue: Foro Italico

Champions

Men's singles
- (Austria) Thomas Muster

Women's singles
- (Spain) Conchita Martínez

Men's doubles
- (Czech Republic) Cyril Suk / (Czech Republic) Daniel Vacek

Women's doubles
- (United States) Gigi Fernández / (Belarus) Natasha Zvereva
- Italian Open

The 1995 Italian Open was a tennis tournament played on outdoor clay courts that was part of the ATP Super 9 of the 1995 ATP Tour and of Tier I of the 1995 WTA Tour. Both the men's and the women's events took place at the Foro Italico in Rome, Italy. The women's tournament was played from 8 May through 14 May 1995 while the men's tournament was played from 15 May through 22 May 1995. Seventh-seeded Thomas Muster and third-seeded Conchita Martínez won the singles titles. It was Muster's second victory at the event after winning in 1990. It was Martínez's third consecutive win at the event after 1993 and 1994.

== Finals ==
=== Men's singles ===
(Austria) Thomas Muster defeated (Spain) Sergi Bruguera 3–6, 7–6^{(7–5)}, 6–2, 6–3

- It was Muster's 5th singles title of the year and the 28th of his career.

=== Women's singles ===
(Spain) Conchita Martínez defeated (Spain) Arantxa Sánchez Vicario 6–3, 6–1

- It was Martinez's 4th singles title of the year and her 24th of her career.

=== Men's doubles ===
(Czech Republic) Cyril Suk / (Czech Republic) Daniel Vacek defeated (Sweden) Jan Apell / (Sweden) Jonas Björkman 6–3, 6–4

- It was Suk's 2nd title of the year and the 13th of his career. It was Vacek's 2nd title of the year and the 8th of his career.

=== Women's doubles ===
(United States) Gigi Fernández / (Belarus) Natasha Zvereva defeated (Spain) Conchita Martínez / (Argentina) Patricia Tarabini 3–6, 7–6^{(7–3)}, 6–4

- It was Fernández's 3rd title of the year and the 58th of her career. It was Zvereva's 2nd title of the year and the 57th of her career.
