= 1996 WTA Tier I Series =

Women's professional tennis tour

Details
- Duration: January 29 – October 20
- Edition: 7th
- Tournaments: 8

Achievements (singles)
- Most titles: (Germany) Steffi Graf (3)
- Most finals: (Germany) Steffi Graf (Spain) Arantxa Sánchez (3)

The WTA Tier I events are part of the elite tour for professional women's tennis organised by the WTA called the WTA Tour.

== Tournaments ==
Tournament	Country	Location	Surface	Date	Prize money
Toray Pan Pacific Open	Japan	Tokyo	Carpet (i)	Jan 29 – Feb 4	$926,250
State Farm Evert Cup	United States	Indian Wells	Hard	Mar 8 – 17	$550,000
Lipton Championships	United States	Key Biscayne	Hard	Mar 21 – 31	$1,550,000
Family Circle Cup	United States	Hilton Head Island	Clay	Apr 1 – 8	$926,250
Italian Open	Italy	Rome	Clay	May 6 – 12	$926,250
WTA German Open	Germany	Berlin	Clay	May 13 – 19	$926,250
du Maurier Open	Canada	Montreal	Hard	Aug 5 – 11	$926,250
European Indoors	Switzerland	Zürich	Carpet (i)	Oct 14 – 20	$926,250

== Results ==
* First-time champion

Tournament	Singles champions	Runners-up	Score	Doubles champions	Runners-up	Score
Tokyo Singles – Doubles	(Croatia) Iva Majoli	(Spain) Arantxa Sánchez Vicario	6–4, 6–1	(United States) Gigi Fernández (Belarus) Natasha Zvereva	(South Africa) Mariaan de Swardt (Romania) Irina Spîrlea	7–6, 6–3
Indian Wells Singles – Doubles	(Germany) Steffi Graf	(Spain) Conchita Martínez	7–6^{(7–5)}, 7–6^{(7–5)}	(United States) Chanda Rubin*	(France) Julie Halard-Decugis (France) Nathalie Tauziat	6–1, 6–4
Indian Wells Singles – Doubles	(Germany) Steffi Graf	(Spain) Conchita Martínez	7–6^{(7–5)}, 7–6^{(7–5)}	(Netherlands) Brenda Schultz-McCarthy	(France) Julie Halard-Decugis (France) Nathalie Tauziat	6–1, 6–4
Miami Singles – Doubles	(Germany) Steffi Graf	(United States) Chanda Rubin	6–1, 6–3	(Czech Republic) Jana Novotná (Spain) Arantxa Sánchez Vicario	(United States) Meredith McGrath (Latvia) Larisa Neiland	6–4, 6–4
Hilton Head Singles – Doubles	(Spain) Arantxa Sánchez Vicario	(Austria) Barbara Paulus	6–2, 2–6, 6–2	(Czech Republic) Jana Novotná (Spain) Arantxa Sánchez Vicario	(United States) Gigi Fernández (United States) Mary Joe Fernández	6–2, 6–3
Rome Singles – Doubles	(Spain) Conchita Martínez	(Switzerland) Martina Hingis	6–2, 6–3	(Spain) Arantxa Sánchez Vicario	(United States) Gigi Fernández (Switzerland) Martina Hingis	6–4, 3–6, 6–3
Rome Singles – Doubles	(Spain) Conchita Martínez	(Switzerland) Martina Hingis	6–2, 6–3	(Romania) Irina Spîrlea*	(United States) Gigi Fernández (Switzerland) Martina Hingis	6–4, 3–6, 6–3
Berlin Singles – Doubles	(Germany) Steffi Graf	(Slovakia) Karina Habšudová	4–6, 6–2, 7–5	(United States) Meredith McGrath (Latvia) Larisa Neiland	(Switzerland) Martina Hingis (Czech Republic) Helena Suková	6–1, 5–7, 7–6^{(7–4)}
Montréal Singles – Doubles	(United States) Monica Seles	(Spain) Arantxa Sánchez Vicario	6–1, 7–6^{(7–2)}	(Latvia) Larisa Neiland (Spain) Arantxa Sánchez Vicario	(United States) Mary Joe Fernández (Czech Republic) Helena Suková	7–6, 6–1
Zürich Singles – Doubles	(Czech Republic) Jana Novotná*	(Switzerland) Martina Hingis	6–2, 6–2	(Switzerland) Martina Hingis*	(United States) Nicole Arendt (Belarus) Natasha Zvereva	7–5, 6–4
Zürich Singles – Doubles	(Czech Republic) Jana Novotná*	(Switzerland) Martina Hingis	6–2, 6–2	(Czech Republic) Helena Suková	(United States) Nicole Arendt (Belarus) Natasha Zvereva	7–5, 6–4

== See also ==
- WTA Tier I events
- 1996 WTA Tour
- 1996 ATP Super 9
- 1996 ATP Tour
