= 1996 ATP Super 9 =

Men's professional tennis tour

Details
- Duration: March 11 – November 19
- Edition: 7th
- Tournaments: 9

Achievements (singles)
- Most titles: (United States) Andre Agassi (Austria) Thomas Muster (2)
- Most finals: (United States) Andre Agassi (Germany) Boris Becker (United States) Michael Chang (Austria) Thomas Muster (United States) Pete Sampras (2)

The 1996 ATP Super 9 (also known as Mercedes-Benz Super 9 for sponsorship reasons) were part of the 1996 ATP Tour, the elite tour for professional men's tennis organised by the Association of Tennis Professionals.

== Results ==
* First-time champion

Masters	Singles champions	Runners-up	Score	Doubles champions	Runners-up	Score
Indian Wells Singles – Doubles	(United States) Michael Chang	(Netherlands) Paul Haarhuis	7–5, 6–1, 6–1	(Australia) Todd Woodbridge (Australia) Mark Woodforde	(United States) Brian MacPhie (Australia) Michael Tebbutt	6–3, 6–4
Miami Singles – Doubles	(United States) Andre Agassi	(Croatia) Goran Ivanišević	3–0 ret.	(Australia) Todd Woodbridge (Australia) Mark Woodforde	(South Africa) Ellis Ferreira (United States) Patrick Galbraith	6–1, 6–3
Monte Carlo Singles – Doubles	(Austria) Thomas Muster	(Spain) Albert Costa	6–3, 5–7, 4–6, 6–3, 6–2	(South Africa) Ellis Ferreira*	(Sweden) Jonas Björkman (Sweden) Nicklas Kulti	6–2, 6–7, 6–2
Monte Carlo Singles – Doubles	(Austria) Thomas Muster	(Spain) Albert Costa	6–3, 5–7, 4–6, 6–3, 6–2	(Netherlands) Jan Siemerink	(Sweden) Jonas Björkman (Sweden) Nicklas Kulti	6–2, 6–7, 6–2
Hamburg Singles – Doubles	(Spain) Roberto Carretero*	(Spain) Àlex Corretja	2–6, 6–4, 6–4, 6–4	(The Bahamas) Mark Knowles	(France) Guy Forget (Switzerland) Jakob Hlasek	6–4, 7–6
Hamburg Singles – Doubles	(Spain) Roberto Carretero*	(Spain) Àlex Corretja	2–6, 6–4, 6–4, 6–4	(Canada) Daniel Nestor*	(France) Guy Forget (Switzerland) Jakob Hlasek	6–4, 7–6
Rome Singles – Doubles	(Austria) Thomas Muster	(Netherlands) Richard Krajicek	6–2, 6–4, 3–6, 6–3	(Zimbabwe) Byron Black (Canada) Grant Connell	(Czech Republic) Libor Pimek (South Africa) Byron Talbot	6–2, 6–3
Cincinnati Singles – Doubles	(United States) Andre Agassi	(United States) Michael Chang	7–6^{(7–4)}, 6–4	(The Bahamas) Mark Knowles (Canada) Daniel Nestor	(Australia) Sandon Stolle (Czech Republic) Cyril Suk	6–2, 7–5
Toronto Singles – Doubles	(South Africa) Wayne Ferreira*	(Australia) Todd Woodbridge	6–2, 6–4	(United States) Patrick Galbraith (Netherlands) Paul Haarhuis	(The Bahamas) Mark Knowles (Canada) Daniel Nestor	7–6, 6–3
Stuttgart Singles – Doubles	(Germany) Boris Becker	(United States) Pete Sampras	3–6, 6–3, 3–6, 6–3, 6–4	(Canada) Sébastien Lareau*	(Netherlands) Jacco Eltingh (Netherlands) Paul Haarhuis	6–4, 6–4
Stuttgart Singles – Doubles	(Germany) Boris Becker	(United States) Pete Sampras	3–6, 6–3, 3–6, 6–3, 6–4	(United States) Alex O'Brien	(Netherlands) Jacco Eltingh (Netherlands) Paul Haarhuis	6–4, 6–4
Paris Singles – Doubles	(Sweden) Thomas Enqvist*	(Russia) Yevgeny Kafelnikov	6–2, 6–4, 7–5	(Netherlands) Jacco Eltingh (Netherlands) Paul Haarhuis	(Russia) Yevgeny Kafelnikov (Czech Republic) Daniel Vacek	6–2, 6–4

== Titles won by player ==
=== Singles ===
#	Player	IN	MI	MO	HA	RO	CA	CI	ST	PA	#	Winning span
	(United States) Andre Agassi	-	3	-	-	-	3	2	-	1	9	1990–1996 (7)
	(Austria) Thomas Muster	-	-	3	-	3	-	-	1	-	7	1990–1996 (7)
	(United States) Pete Sampras	2	2	-	-	1	-	1	-	1	7	1992–1995 (4)
	(United States) Michael Chang	2	1	-	-	-	1	2	-	-	6	1990–1995 (6)
	(United States) Jim Courier	2	1	-	-	2	-	-	-	-	5	1991–1993 (3)
	(Germany) Boris Becker	-	-	-	-	-	-	-	4	1	5	1990–1996 (7)
	(Sweden) Stefan Edberg	1	-	-	1	-	-	1	-	1	4	1990–1992 (3)
	(Ukraine) Andrei Medvedev	-	-	1	2	-	-	-	-	-	3	1994–1995 (2)
	(Spain) Sergi Bruguera	-	-	2	-	-	-	-	-	-	2	1991–1993 (3)
	(Russia) Andrei Chesnokov	-	-	1	-	-	1	-	-	-	2	1990–1991 (2)
	(France) Guy Forget	-	-	-	-	-	-	1	-	1	2	1991
	(Croatia) Goran Ivanišević	-	-	-	-	-	-	-	1	1	2	1992–1993 (2)
	(Germany) Michael Stich	-	-	-	1	-	-	-	1	-	2	1993
	(Spain) Juan Aguilera	-	-	-	1	-	-	-	-	-	1	1990
	(Spain) Roberto Carretero	-	-	-	1	-	-	-	-	-	1	1996
	(Sweden) Thomas Enqvist	-	-	-	-	-	-	-	-	1	1	1996
	(South Africa) Wayne Ferreira	-	-	-	-	-	1	-	-	-	1	1996
	(Czech Republic) Karel Nováček	-	-	-	1	-	-	-	-	-	1	1991
	(Sweden) Mikael Pernfors	-	-	-	-	-	1	-	-	-	1	1993
	(Spain) Emilio Sánchez	-	-	-	-	1	-	-	-	-	1	1991
#	Player	IN	MI	MO	HA	RO	CA	CI	ST	PA	#	Winning span

== See also ==
- ATP Tour Masters 1000
- 1996 ATP Tour
- 1996 WTA Tier I Series
- 1996 WTA Tour
