= 1996 du Maurier Open – Women's singles =

Women's singles
- 1996 du Maurier Open

Final
- Champion: (United States) Monica Seles
- Runner-up: (Spain) Arantxa Sánchez Vicario
- Score: 6–1, 7–6^{(7–2)}

Details
- Draw: 56
- Seeds: 16

Events
Singles	men	women
Doubles	men	women
- du Maurier Open

Defending champion Monica Seles defeated Arantxa Sánchez Vicario in the final, 6–1, 7–6^{(7–2)} to win the women's singles tennis title at the 1996 Canadian Open.

== Seeds ==
A champion seed is indicated in bold text while text in italics indicates the round in which that seed was eliminated. The top eight seeds received a bye to the second round.

1. (United States) **Monica Seles (champion)**
2. (Spain) Arantxa Sánchez Vicario (final)
3. (Croatia) Iva Majoli (second round)
4. (Germany) Anke Huber (second round)
5. (United States) Mary Joe Fernández (quarterfinals)
6. (Bulgaria) Magdalena Maleeva (quarterfinals)
7. (Netherlands) Brenda Schultz-McCarthy (second round)
8. (France) Mary Pierce (third round)
9. (Argentina) Gabriela Sabatini (third round)
10. (South Africa) Amanda Coetzer (third round)
11. (Romania) Irina Spîrlea (first round)
12. (Slovakia) Karina Habšudová (second round)
13. (United States) Amy Frazier (quarterfinals)
14. (Czech Republic) Helena Suková (first round)
15. (France) Nathalie Tauziat (third round)
16. (Russia) Elena Likhovtseva (third round)

== Draw ==
Key

- Q = Qualifier
- WC = Wild card
- LL = Lucky loser
- Alt = Alternate
- ITF = ITF entry
- PR = Protected ranking
- SR = Special ranking
- SE = Special exempt
- JE = Junior exempt
- JR = Junior Accelerator Programme entrant
- CO = College Accelerator Programme entrant
- NG = Next Gen Accelerator Program entrant
- w/o = Walkover
- r = Retired
- d = Defaulted

=== Finals ===
Semifinals
1	(United States) **Monica Seles**	**6**	**6**
(Indonesia) Yayuk Basuki	0	3
Q	(United States) Kimberly Po	0	4
2	(Spain) **Arantxa Sánchez Vicario**	**6**	**6**

Final
1	(United States) **Monica Seles**	**6**	**7^{7}**
2	(Spain) Arantxa Sánchez Vicario	1	6^{2}

=== Top half ===
==== Section 1 ====
First round
(Spain) G León García	**6**	3	6
(Slovakia) **K Studeníková**	2	**6**	**7**
(France) **S Testud**	**6**	3	**6**
WC	(Canada) R Simpson	3	**6**	3
Q	(Canada) S Jeyaseelan	4	2
9	(Argentina) **G Sabatini**	**6**	**6**
11	(Romania) I Spîrlea	4	2
(United States) **J Capriati**	**6**	**6**
(United States) **L McNeil**	**6**	6	**7**
(Italy) S Farina	3	**7**	5
WC	(Canada) J Nejedly	6	1
(United States) **L Raymond**	**7**	**6**

Second round
1	(United States) **M Seles**	**6**	**6**
(Slovakia) K Studeníková	2	0
(France) S Testud	3	**6**	3
9	(Argentina) **G Sabatini**	**6**	0	**6**
(United States) **J Capriati**	**7**	**7**
(United States) L McNeil	6	5
(United States) L Raymond	4	3
6	(Bulgaria) **M Maleeva**	**6**	**6**

Third round
1	(United States) **M Seles**	**7**	**6**
9	(Argentina) G Sabatini	6	1
(United States) J Capriati	2	2	r
6	(Bulgaria) **M Maleeva**	**6**	**3**

Quarterfinals
1	(United States) **M Seles**	**6**	**6**
6	(Bulgaria) M Maleeva	4	2

==== Section 2 ====
First round
(Indonesia) **Y Basuki**	**6**	**7**
(Chinese Taipei) S-T Wang	2	5
(United States) A Miller	**7**	5	6
(United States) **N Arendt**	5	**7**	**7**
(Latvia) L Savchenko	1	2
16	(Russia) **E Likhovtseva**	**6**	**6**
13	(United States) **A Frazier**	**6**	**7**
(France) A Fusai	0	6
(United States) **A Grossman**	4	**6**	**6**
(Canada) P Hy-Boulais	**6**	3	1
(Russia) **E Makarova**	**7**	**6**
(Germany) B Rittner	5	3

Second round
3	(Croatia) I Majoli	6	2
(Indonesia) **Y Basuki**	**7**	**6**
(United States) N Arendt	4	5
16	(Russia) **E Likhovtseva**	**6**	**7**
13	(United States) **A Frazier**	**6**	**6**
(United States) A Grossman	2	0
(Russia) E Makarova	**6**	3	3
8	(France) **M Pierce**	2	**6**	**6**

Third round
(Indonesia) **Y Basuki**	**6**	6	**6**
16	(Russia) E Likhovtseva	1	**7**	4
13	(United States) **A Frazier**	**6**	**6**
8	(France) M Pierce	3	3

Quarterfinals
(Indonesia) **Y Basuki**	2	**6**	**7**
13	(United States) A Frazier	**6**	2	5

=== Bottom half ===
==== Section 3 ====
First round
(United States) M Werdel-Witmeyer	4	2
(South Korea) **S-H Park**	**6**	**6**
(Germany) **P Begerow**	**6**	**6**
Q	(Germany) C Singer	1	2
(Sweden) Å Carlsson	2	4
15	(France) **N Tauziat**	**6**	**6**
12	(Slovakia) **K Habšudová**	**6**	**6**
(Austria) B Schett	0	0
(Italy) F Lubiani	1	4
Q	(Australia) **R Stubbs**	**6**	**6**
WC	(Canada) C Popescu	3	3
Q	(United States) **K Po**	**6**	**6**

Second round
5	(United States) **M J Fernández**	**6**	**6**
(South Korea) S-H Park	1	1
(Germany) P Begerow	1	**6**	4
15	(France) **N Tauziat**	**6**	3	**6**
12	(Slovakia) K Habšudová	2	4
Q	(Australia) **R Stubbs**	**6**	**6**
Q	(United States) **K Po**	**6**	**6**
4	(Germany) A Huber	4	4

Third round
5	(United States) **M J Fernández**	**6**	**6**
15	(France) N Tauziat	1	1
Q	(Australia) R Stubbs	3	2
Q	(United States) **K Po**	**6**	**6**

Quarterfinals
5	(United States) M J Fernández	2	3
Q	(United States) **K Po**	**6**	**6**

==== Section 4 ====
First round
(United States) S Cacic	2	4
(Japan) **N Kijimuta**	**6**	**6**
Q	(Argentina) M Paz	1	1
(Argentina) **F Labat**	**6**	**6**
Q	(Spain) **V Ruano-Pascual**	**7**	3	**6**
14	(Czech Republic) H Suková	5	**6**	4
10	(South Africa) **A Coetzer**	**6**	**6**
(Italy) R Grande	3	2
(Netherlands) K Boogert	1	2
Q	(United States) **J Watanabe**	**6**	**6**
(Italy) G Pizzichini	1	4
Q	(Italy) **N Baudone**	**6**	**6**

Second round
7	(Netherlands) B Schultz-McCarthy	**7**	1	2
(Japan) **N Kijimuta**	6	**6**	**6**
(Argentina) **F Labat**	**6**	**6**
Q	(Spain) V Ruano-Pascual	3	2
10	(South Africa) **A Coetzer**	**6**	**6**
Q	(United States) J Watanabe	0	0
Q	(Italy) N Baudone	0	0
2	(Spain) **A Sánchez Vicario**	**6**	**6**

Third round
(Japan) N Kijimuta	3	0
(Argentina) **F Labat**	**6**	**6**
10	(South Africa) A Coetzer	5	1
2	(Spain) **A Sánchez Vicario**	**7**	**6**

Quarterfinals
(Argentina) F Labat	4	4
2	(Spain) **A Sánchez Vicario**	**6**	**6**
