= 1996 du Maurier Open – Women's doubles =

Women's doubles
- 1996 du Maurier Open
- 1995 Champions: (Argentina) Gabriela Sabatini (Netherlands) Brenda Schultz-McCarthy

Final
- Champions: (Latvia) Larisa Savchenko (Spain) Arantxa Sánchez Vicario
- Runners-up: (United States) Mary Joe Fernández (Czech Republic) Helena Suková
- Score: 7–6, 6–1

Details
- Draw: 28
- Seeds: 8

Events
Singles	men	women
Doubles	men	women
- du Maurier Open

Gabriela Sabatini and Brenda Schultz-McCarthy were the defending champions but lost in the semifinals to Larisa Savchenko and Arantxa Sánchez Vicario.

Savchenko and Sánchez Vicario won in the final 7–6, 6–1 against Mary Joe Fernández and Helena Suková.

== Seeds ==
Champion seeds are indicated in bold text while text in italics indicates the round in which those seeds were eliminated. The top four seeded teams received byes into the second round.

1. (Latvia) **Larisa Savchenko** / (Spain) **Arantxa Sánchez Vicario (champions)**
2. (United States) Mary Joe Fernández / (Czech Republic) Helena Suková (final)
3. (Argentina) Gabriela Sabatini / (Netherlands) Brenda Schultz-McCarthy (semifinals)
4. (United States) Nicole Arendt / (Netherlands) Manon Bollegraf (second round)
5. (United States) Lisa Raymond / (Australia) Rennae Stubbs (quarterfinals)
6. (South Africa) Amanda Coetzer / (United States) Lori McNeil (quarterfinals)
7. (Indonesia) Yayuk Basuki / (Netherlands) Caroline Vis (semifinals)
8. (Netherlands) Kristie Boogert / (Romania) Irina Spîrlea (first round)

== Draw ==
Key

- Q = Qualifier
- WC = Wild card
- LL = Lucky loser
- Alt = Alternate
- ITF = ITF entry
- PR = Protected ranking
- SR = Special ranking
- SE = Special exempt
- JE = Junior exempt
- JR = Junior Accelerator Programme entrant
- CO = College Accelerator Programme entrant
- NG = Next Gen Accelerator Program entrant
- w/o = Walkover
- r = Retired
- d = Defaulted

=== Final ===
Final
1	(Latvia) **Larisa Savchenko** (Spain) **Arantxa Sánchez Vicario**	**7**	**6**
2	(United States) Mary Joe Fernández (Czech Republic) Helena Suková	6	1

=== Top half ===
First round
(United States) **A Grossman** (Spain) **V Ruano-Pascual**	**6**	**6**
(Russia) E Makarova (United States) J Watanabe	0	3
WC	(Canada) M Bernard (Canada) C Popescu	0	3
(South Korea) **S-H Park** (Chinese Taipei) **S-T Wang**	**6**	**6**
(Canada) **S Jeyaseelan** (Canada) **R Simpson**	3	**6**	**6**
8	(Netherlands) K Boogert (Romania) I Spîrlea	**6**	3	1
(Sweden) Å Carlsson (Sweden) M Strandlund	6	**7**	3
(Italy) **L Golarsa** (France) **N Tauziat**	**7**	6	**6**
WC	(Canada) J Nejedly (Canada) V Webb	**7**	6	4
(France) **A Dechaume-Balleret** (France) **S Testud**	6	**7**	**6**
(Finland) N Dahlman (United Kingdom) C Wood	4	2
6	(South Africa) **A Coetzer** (United States) **L McNeil**	**6**	**6**

Second round
1	(Latvia) **L Savchenko** (Spain) **A Sánchez Vicario**	**6**	**6**
(United States) A Grossman (Spain) V Ruano-Pascual	1	4
(South Korea) S-H Park (Chinese Taipei) S-T Wang	3	**6**	4
(Canada) **S Jeyaseelan** (Canada) **R Simpson**	**6**	2	**6**
3	(Argentina) **G Sabatini** (Netherlands) **B Schultz-McCarthy**	**6**	**6**
(Italy) L Golarsa (France) N Tauziat	2	1
(France) A Dechaume-Balleret (France) S Testud	3	3
6	(South Africa) **A Coetzer** (United States) **L McNeil**	**6**	**6**

Quarterfinals
1	(Latvia) **L Savchenko** (Spain) **A Sánchez Vicario**	**6**	**6**
(Canada) S Jeyaseelan (Canada) R Simpson	0	3
3	(Argentina) **G Sabatini** (Netherlands) **B Schultz-McCarthy**	**6**	**7**
6	(South Africa) A Coetzer (United States) L McNeil	2	6

Semifinals
1	(Latvia) **L Savchenko** (Spain) **A Sánchez Vicario**	**7**	**6**
3	(Argentina) G Sabatini (Netherlands) B Schultz-McCarthy	5	2

=== Bottom half ===
First round
7	(Indonesia) **Y Basuki** (Netherlands) **C Vis**	3	**6**	**6**
(United States) A Frazier (United States) K Po	**6**	4	4
(Germany) B Rittner (Germany) C Singer	4	5
(Japan) **N Kijimuta** (Argentina) **F Labat**	**6**	**7**
Q	(Italy) **S Farina** (Austria) **B Schett**	**6**	**7**
(United States) S Reece (United States) M Werdel-Witmeyer	2	6
5	(United States) **L Raymond** (Australia) **R Stubbs**	0	**6**	**6**
(Germany) A Huber (Croatia) I Majoli	**6**	4	3
(Canada) **J Hetherington** (United States) **K Rinaldi-Stunkel**	**6**	**6**
(Italy) R Grande (Russia) E Likhovtseva	4	4
(Canada) P Hy-Boulais (South Africa) R Nideffer	3	**7**	2
(France) **A Fusai** (Argentina) **M Paz**	**6**	6	**6**

Second round
7	(Indonesia) **Y Basuki** (Netherlands) **C Vis**	**7**	**6**
(Japan) N Kijimuta (Argentina) F Labat	5	3
Q	(Italy) **S Farina** (Austria) **B Schett**	**w/o**
4	(United States) N Arendt (Netherlands) M Bollegraf
5	(United States) **L Raymond** (Australia) **R Stubbs**	**6**	5	**7**
(Canada) J Hetherington (United States) K Rinaldi-Stunkel	3	**7**	5
(France) A Fusai (Argentina) M Paz	4	0
2	(United States) **M J Fernández** (Czech Republic) **H Suková**	**6**	**6**

Quarterfinals
7	(Indonesia) **Y Basuki** (Netherlands) **C Vis**	6	**6**	**7**
Q	(Italy) S Farina (Austria) B Schett	**7**	3	5
5	(United States) L Raymond (Australia) R Stubbs	2	4
2	(United States) **M J Fernández** (Czech Republic) **H Suková**	**6**	**6**

Semifinals
7	(Indonesia) Y Basuki (Netherlands) C Vis	4	**6**	5
2	(United States) **M J Fernández** (Czech Republic) **H Suková**	**6**	3	**7**
