= 1996 du Maurier Open – Men's doubles =

Men's doubles
- 1996 du Maurier Open
- 1995 Champions: (Russia) Yevgeny Kafelnikov (Russia) Andrei Olhovskiy

Final
- Champions: (United States) Patrick Galbraith (Netherlands) Paul Haarhuis
- Runners-up: (The Bahamas) Mark Knowles (Canada) Daniel Nestor
- Score: 7–6, 6–3

Details
- Draw: 28
- Seeds: 8

Events
Singles	men	women
Doubles	men	women
- du Maurier Open

Yevgeny Kafelnikov and Andrei Olhovskiy were the defending champions but only Olhovskiy competed that year with Ken Flach.

Flach and Olhovskiy lost in the first round to Sébastien Leblanc and Jocelyn Robichaud.

Patrick Galbraith and Paul Haarhuis won in the final 7–6, 6–3 against Mark Knowles and Daniel Nestor.

== Seeds ==
Champion seeds are indicated in bold text while text in italics indicates the round in which those seeds were eliminated. The top four seeded teams received byes into the second round.

1. (Australia) Todd Woodbridge / (Australia) Mark Woodforde (quarterfinals)
2. (Zimbabwe) Byron Black / (Canada) Grant Connell (quarterfinals)
3. (The Bahamas) Mark Knowles / (Canada) Daniel Nestor (final)
4. (United States) **Patrick Galbraith** / (Netherlands) **Paul Haarhuis (champions)**
5. (France) Guy Forget / (Switzerland) Jakob Hlasek (first round)
6. (Canada) Sébastien Lareau / (United States) Alex O'Brien (quarterfinals)
7. (Sweden) Jonas Björkman / (Sweden) Nicklas Kulti (semifinals)
8. (Czech Republic) Jiří Novák / (Czech Republic) Daniel Vacek (first round)

== Draw ==
Key

- Q = Qualifier
- WC = Wild card
- LL = Lucky loser
- Alt = Alternate
- ITF = ITF entry
- PR = Protected ranking
- SR = Special ranking
- SE = Special exempt
- JE = Junior exempt
- JR = Junior Accelerator Programme entrant
- CO = College Accelerator Programme entrant
- NG = Next Gen Accelerator Program entrant
- w/o = Walkover
- r = Retired
- d = Defaulted

=== Final ===
Final

4
- (United States) **Patrick Galbraith**
- (Netherlands) **Paul Haarhuis**
**7**
**6**

3
- (The Bahamas) Mark Knowles
- (Canada) Daniel Nestor
6
3

=== Top half ===
First round

Second round

Quarterfinals

Semifinals

1
- (Australia) **T Woodbridge**
- (Australia) **M Woodforde**
2
**6**
**6**

WC
- (Croatia) S Hiršzon
- (Croatia) G Ivanišević
3
2

- (United Kingdom) N Broad
- (South Africa) P Norval
**6**
4
4

- (United Kingdom) **N Broad**
- (South Africa) **P Norval**
**6**
**6**

1
- (Australia) T Woodbridge
- (Australia) M Woodforde
**6**
2
4

- (United States) **K Jones**
- (United States) **C Woodruff**
**7**
**7**

- (Argentina) **L Lobo**
- (Spain) **J Sánchez**
4
**6**
**6**

- (United States) M Keil
- (South Africa) G Muller
6
6

- (United States) K Jones
- (United States) C Woodruff

- (Argentina) **L Lobo**
- (Spain) **J Sánchez**
**7**
6
**6**

- (Argentina) **L Lobo**
- (Spain) **J Sánchez**
w/o

8
- (Czech Republic) J Novák
- (Czech Republic) D Vacek
6
**7**
4

- (Argentina) L Lobo
- (Spain) J Sánchez
6
2

4
- (United States) **P Galbraith**
- (Netherlands) **P Haarhuis**
**7**
**6**

4
- (United States) **P Galbraith**
- (Netherlands) **P Haarhuis**
**6**
**7**

Q
- (Canada) **R Janecek**
- (Canada) **G Michibata**
**7**
**7**

Q
- (Canada) R Janecek
- (Canada) G Michibata
3
6

- (Sweden) D Ekerot
- (United States) G Van Emburgh
6
5

4
- (United States) **P Galbraith**
- (Netherlands) **P Haarhuis**
6
**6**
**6**

- (United States) K Flach
- (Russia) A Olhovskiy
**7**
3
3

6
- (Canada) S Lareau
- (United States) A O'Brien
**7**
4
1

WC
- (Canada) **S Leblanc**
- (Canada) **J Robichaud**
5
**6**
**6**

WC
- (Canada) S Leblanc
- (Canada) J Robichaud
4
4

- (Spain) T Carbonell
- (Spain) F Roig
3
**6**
3

6
- (Canada) **S Lareau**
- (United States) **A O'Brien**
**6**
**6**

6
- (Canada) **S Lareau**
- (United States) **A O'Brien**
**6**
3
**6**

=== Bottom half ===
First round

Second round

Quarterfinals

Semifinals

5
- (France) G Forget
- (Switzerland) J Hlasek
**6**
6
4

- (Australia) **M Philippoussis**
- (Australia) **P Rafter**
4
**7**
**6**

- (Australia) M Philippoussis
- (Australia) P Rafter
6
3

- (United States) **D Johnson**
- (United States) **F Montana**
6
**6**
**7**

- (United States) **D Johnson**
- (United States) **F Montana**
**7**
**6**

9
- (United States) S Cannon
- (The Bahamas) R Smith
**7**
4
6

- (United States) D Johnson
- (United States) F Montana
3
5

WC
- (Australia) P Cash
- (Canada) B Kokavec
4
4

3
- (The Bahamas) **M Knowles**
- (Canada) **D Nestor**
**6**
**7**

- (Czech Republic) **P Korda**
- (Czech Republic) **C Suk**
**6**
**6**

- (Czech Republic) P Korda
- (Czech Republic) C Suk
6
3

3
- (The Bahamas) **M Knowles**
- (Canada) **D Nestor**
**7**
**6**

3
- (The Bahamas) **M Knowles**
- (Canada) **D Nestor**
4
**6**
**6**

7
- (Sweden) **J Björkman**
- (Sweden) **N Kulti**
**6**
**6**

7
- (Sweden) J Björkman
- (Sweden) N Kulti
**6**
3
4

Q
- (United States) B Dickinson
- (Japan) T Suzuki
4
1

7
- (Sweden) **J Björkman**
- (Sweden) **N Kulti**
**6**
**6**

- (Spain) **J A Conde**
- (Spain) **À Corretja**
1
**7**
**6**

- (Spain) J A Conde
- (Spain) À Corretja
3
4

WC
- (Italy) A Gaudenzi
- (Austria) T Muster
**6**
6
4

7
- (Sweden) **J Björkman**
- (Sweden) **N Kulti**
**6**
5
**7**

- (South Africa) D Adams
- (Netherlands) S Schalken
6
**6**
4

2
- (Zimbabwe) B Black
- (Canada) G Connell
4
**7**
6

- (South Africa) **M Barnard**
- (Sweden) **P Nyborg**
**7**
3
**6**

- (South Africa) M Barnard
- (Sweden) P Nyborg
6
4

2
- (Zimbabwe) **B Black**
- (Canada) **G Connell**
**7**
**6**
