= 1996 du Maurier Open – Men's singles =

Men's singles
- 1996 du Maurier Open
- 1995 Champion: (United States) Andre Agassi

Final
- Champion: (South Africa) Wayne Ferreira
- Runner-up: (Australia) Todd Woodbridge
- Score: 6–2, 6–4

Details
- Draw: 56
- Seeds: 16

Events
Singles	men	women
Doubles	men	women
← 1995 ·	du Maurier Open	· 1997 →

Wayne Ferreira defeated Todd Woodbridge in the final, 6–2, 6–4 to win the men's singles tennis title at the 1996 Canadian Open.

Andre Agassi was the two-time reigning champion, but did not compete that year.

== Seeds ==
A champion seed is indicated in bold text while text in italics indicates the round in which that seed was eliminated. The top eight seeds received a bye to the second round.

1. (Austria) Thomas Muster (second round)
2. (Croatia) Goran Ivanišević (second round)
3. (South Africa) **Wayne Ferreira (champion)**
4. (Chile) Marcelo Ríos (semifinals)
5. (Sweden) Thomas Enqvist (quarterfinals)
6. (United States) MaliVai Washington (third round)
7. (United States) Todd Martin (semifinals)
8. (Switzerland) Marc Rosset (second round)
9. (France) Cédric Pioline (third round)
10. (France) Arnaud Boetsch (first round)
11. (Spain) Alberto Berasategui (second round)
12. (Spain) Francisco Clavet (second round)
13. (Australia) Jason Stoltenberg (second round)
14. (Netherlands) Paul Haarhuis (first round)
15. (Australia) Mark Woodforde (first round)
16. (Sweden) Magnus Gustafsson (first round)

== Draw ==
=== Key ===
- Q = Qualifier
- WC = Wild card
- LL = Lucky loser
- Alt = Alternate
- ITF = ITF entry
- PR = Protected ranking
- SR = Special ranking
- SE = Special exempt
- JE = Junior exempt
- JR = Junior Accelerator Programme entrant
- CO = College Accelerator Programme entrant
- NG = Next Gen Accelerator Program entrant
- w/o = Walkover
- r = Retired
- d = Defaulted

=== Finals ===
Semifinals
(Australia) **Todd Woodbridge**	**6**	**6**
4	(Chile) Marcelo Ríos	0	3
3	(South Africa) **Wayne Ferreira**	4	**6**	**7**
7	(United States) Todd Martin	**6**	3	5

Final
(Australia) Todd Woodbridge	2	4
3	(South Africa) **Wayne Ferreira**	**6**	**6**

=== Top half ===
==== Section 1 ====
First round
Q	(Germany) M-K Goellner	6^{4}	4
WC	(Canada) **D Nestor**	**7^{7}**	**6**
WC	(Canada) **S Lareau**	**6**	**6**
WC	(Canada) J Robichaud	1	4
(Australia) **T Woodbridge**	**6**	**7**
15	(Australia) M Woodforde	3	5
10	(France) A Boetsch	**6**	5	2
(Italy) **A Gaudenzi**	4	**7**	**6**
(Czech Republic) **B Ulihrach**	**7**	**7**
(Argentina) H Gumy	5	5
(Netherlands) S Schalken	3	4
(Australia) **M Philippoussis**	**6**	**6**

Second round
1	(Austria) T Muster	3	5
WC	(Canada) **D Nestor**	**6**	**7**
WC	(Canada) S Lareau	3	**6**	1
(Australia) **T Woodbridge**	**6**	4	**6**
(Italy) A Gaudenzi	3	**6**	1
(Czech Republic) **B Ulihrach**	**6**	4	**6**
(Australia) **M Philippoussis**	**6**	3	**7^{8}**
8	(Switzerland) M Rosset	3	**6**	6^{6}

Third round
WC	(Canada) D Nestor	6^{2}	6^{4}
(Australia) **T Woodbridge**	**7^{7}**	**7^{7}**
(Czech Republic) B Ulihrach	3	4
(Australia) **M Philippoussis**	**6**	**6**

Quarterfinals
(Australia) **T Woodbridge**	**7**	**6**
(Australia) M Philippoussis	5	4

==== Section 2 ====
First round
Q	(Denmark) **K Carlsen**	**6**	**6**
(Spain) J Burillo	2	0
(Germany) B Karbacher	4	**6**	3
(Czech Republic) **D Vacek**	**6**	4	**6**
(Spain) T Carbonell	1	0
13	(Australia) **J Stoltenberg**	**6**	**6**
11	(Spain) **A Berasategui**	**6**	**6**
(Belgium) F Dewulf	4	0
(Australia) **P Rafter**	**7^{8}**	**6**
(Spain) C Costa	6^{6}	2
(France) G Forget	3	**6**	3
(Spain) **À Corretja**	**6**	3	**6**

Second round
4	(Chile) **M Ríos**	**6**	**6**
Q	(Denmark) K Carlsen	3	2
(Czech Republic) **D Vacek**	5	**7^{7}**	**7^{13}**
13	(Australia) J Stoltenberg	**7**	6^{1}	6^{11}
11	(Spain) A Berasategui	1	2
(Australia) **P Rafter**	**6**	**6**
(Spain) À Corretja	4	2
6	(United States) **M Washington**	**6**	**6**

Third round
4	(Chile) **M Ríos**	**6**	**6**
(Czech Republic) D Vacek	4	3
(Australia) **P Rafter**	**6**	**6**
6	(United States) M Washington	2	1

Quarterfinals
4	(Chile) **M Ríos**	0	**7^{7}**	**6**
(Australia) P Rafter	**6**	6^{4}	1

=== Bottom half ===
==== Section 3 ====
First round
(Spain) **J Sánchez**	**7^{7}**	**7^{7}**
Q	(Australia) S Draper	6^{5}	6^{5}
(Czech Republic) **P Korda**	3	**6**	**6**
Q	(South Africa) N Godwin	**6**	0	4
Q	(Colombia) M Hadad	4	4
12	(Spain) **F Clavet**	**6**	**6**
14	(Netherlands) P Haarhuis	2	**6**	6^{7}
(United Kingdom) **T Henman**	**6**	2	**7^{9}**
WC	(Canada) S Leblanc	4	3
(United States) **C Woodruff**	**6**	**6**
(Sweden) J Björkman	1	**7**	3
(Czech Republic) **J Novák**	**6**	5	**6**

Second round
5	(Sweden) **T Enqvist**	**6**	**6**
(Spain) J Sánchez	3	4
(Czech Republic) **P Korda**	**6**	**6**
12	(Spain) F Clavet	3	4
(United Kingdom) **T Henman**	w/o
(United States) C Woodruff
(Czech Republic) J Novák	5	3
3	(South Africa) **W Ferreira**	**7**	**6**

Third round
5	(Sweden) **T Enqvist**	**6**	**6**
(Czech Republic) P Korda	3	4
(United Kingdom) T Henman	4	4
3	(South Africa) **W Ferreira**	**6**	**6**

Quarterfinals
5	(Sweden) T Enqvist	5	2
3	(South Africa) **W Ferreira**	**7**	**6**

==== Section 4 ====
First round
(Norway) C Ruud	1	3
(Italy) **R Furlan**	**6**	**6**
Q	(France) **G Carraz**	**6**	**6**
Q	(The Bahamas) M Knowles	4	0
(Sweden) N Kulti	4	2
9	(France) **C Pioline**	**6**	**6**
16	(Sweden) M Gustafsson	3	6^{5}
SE	(United States) **A O'Brien**	**6**	**7^{7}**
(Zimbabwe) **B Black**	**7^{7}**	3
(Switzerland) J Hlasek	6^{4}	1^{r}
(Sweden) **M Tillström**	**6**	1	**6**
LL	(Germany) J Renzenbrink	3	**6**	3

Second round
7	(United States) **T Martin**	**7^{7}**	**6**
(Italy) R Furlan	6^{3}	3
Q	(France) G Carraz	6^{1}	4
9	(France) **C Pioline**	**7^{7}**	**6**
SE	(United States) **A O'Brien**	**7^{7}**	**6**
(Zimbabwe) B Black	6^{2}	2
(Sweden) **M Tillström**	6^{3}	**6**	**6**
2	(Croatia) G Ivanišević	**7^{7}**	4	4

Third round
7	(United States) **T Martin**	2	**6**	**6**
9	(France) C Pioline	**6**	2	4
SE	(United States) **A O'Brien**	3	**6**	3
(Sweden) M Tillström	**6**	2	**6**

Quarterfinals
7	(United States) **T Martin**	**6**	**6**
SE	(United States) A O'Brien	4	4
