= 1996 du Maurier Open =

- Date: August 19–26 (men); August 5–11 (women)
- Edition: 107th
- Surface: Hard / outdoor

Champions

Men's singles
- (South Africa) Wayne Ferreira

Women's singles
- (United States) Monica Seles

Men's doubles
- (United States) Patrick Galbraith / (Netherlands) Paul Haarhuis

Women's doubles
- (Latvia) Larisa Neiland / (Spain) Arantxa Sánchez Vicario
- Canadian Open

The 1996 du Maurier Open was a tennis tournament played on outdoor hard courts. It was the 107th edition of the Canada Masters and was part of the Mercedes Super 9 of the 1996 ATP Tour and of Tier I of the 1996 WTA Tour. The men's event took place at the National Tennis Centre in Toronto from August 5 through August 11, 1996, while the women's event took place at the du Maurier Stadium in Montreal from August 19 through August 26, 1996.

== Finals ==
=== Men's singles ===
(South Africa) Wayne Ferreira defeated (Australia) Todd Woodbridge 6–2, 6–4

- It was Ferreira's 2nd title of the year and the 18th of his career. It was his 3rd Masters title.

=== Women's singles ===
(United States) Monica Seles defeated (Spain) Arantxa Sánchez Vicario 6–1, 7–6^{(7–2)}

- It was Seles' 3rd title of the year and the 41st of her career. It was her 1st Tier I title of the year and her 6th overall. It was also her 2nd consecutive title at the event after winning in 1995.

=== Men's doubles ===
(United States) Patrick Galbraith / (Netherlands) Paul Haarhuis defeated (The Bahamas) Mark Knowles / (Canada) Daniel Nestor 7–6, 6–3

- It was Galbraith's 3rd title of the year and the 27th of his career. It was Haarhuis' 1st title of the year and the 29th of his career.

=== Women's doubles ===
(Latvia) Larisa Neiland / (Spain) Arantxa Sánchez Vicario defeated (United States) Mary Joe Fernandez / (Czech Republic) Helena Suková 7–6^{(7–1)} (Fernandez and Suková retired)

- It was Neiland's 4th title of the year and the 60th of her career. It was Sánchez Vicario's 11th title of the year and the 73rd of her career.
