= List of WTA Tour top-level tournament doubles champions =

This is a list of the women's doubles tennis champions at the Grand Slam tournaments, the WTA championships, the Olympic Games, and the WTA Tier I/Premier (Premier Mandatory and Premier 5)/1000 tournaments since 1990.

== Champions list ==
Year	Grand Slam tournaments				Tier I tournaments										WTA Finals	Olympics
Year	AO	FO	WI	UO	SD/DO	CO/BR/IW	MI	HH/CH	BE	RO	CA	TO	PH/MO	ZU	WTA Finals	Olympics
1990	(Czechoslovakia) Novotná (Czechoslovakia) Suková*	(Czechoslovakia) Novotná (Czechoslovakia) Suková*	(Czechoslovakia) Novotná (Czechoslovakia) Suková*	(United States) G. Fernández (United States) Navratilova*	not Tier I	(United States) Navratilova (United States) Smith	(Czechoslovakia) Novotná (Czechoslovakia) Suková*	(United States) Navratilova (Spain) Sánchez Vicario*	(Australia) Provis (South Africa) Reinach*	(Canada) Kelesi (Socialist Federal Republic of Yugoslavia) Seles*	(United States) Nagelsen (Argentina) Sabatini*	not Tier I	not Tier I	not Tier I	(United States) Jordan (Australia) Smylie*	not held
1991	(United States) Fendick (United States) M. J. Fernández*	(United States) G. Fernández (Czechoslovakia) Novotná*	(Soviet Union) Savchenko-Neiland (Soviet Union) Zvereva*	(United States) Shriver (Soviet Union) Zvereva*	not Tier I	(Soviet Union) Savchenko-Neiland (Soviet Union) Zvereva	(United States) M. J. Fernández (United States) Garrison*	(Germany) Kohde-Kilsch (Soviet Union) Zvereva*	(Soviet Union) Savchenko-Neiland (Soviet Union) Zvereva*	(United States) Capriati (Socialist Federal Republic of Yugoslavia) Seles*	(Soviet Union) Savchenko-Neiland (Soviet Union) Zvereva*	not Tier I	not Tier I	not Tier I	(United States) Navratilova (United States) Shriver*	not held
1992	(Spain) Sánchez Vicario (Czechoslovakia) Suková*	(United States) G. Fernández (Commonwealth of Independent States) Zvereva*	(United States) G. Fernández (Commonwealth of Independent States) Zvereva*	(United States) G. Fernández (Commonwealth of Independent States) Zvereva*	not Tier I	(Commonwealth of Independent States) Savchenko-Neiland (Commonwealth of Independent States) Zvereva	(Spain) Sánchez Vicario (Latvia) Savchenko-Neiland*	(Spain) Sánchez Vicario (Belarus) Zvereva*	(Czechoslovakia) Novotná (Latvia) Savchenko-Neiland*	(Federal Republic of Yugoslavia) Seles (Czechoslovakia) Suková*	(United States) McNeil (Australia) Stubbs*	not Tier I	not Tier I	not Tier I	(Spain) Sánchez Vicario (Czechoslovakia) Suková*	(United States) G. Fernández (United States) M. J. Fernández*
1993	(United States) G. Fernández (Belarus) Zvereva*	(United States) G. Fernández (Belarus) Zvereva*	(United States) G. Fernández (Belarus) Zvereva*	(Spain) Sánchez Vicario (Czech Republic) Suková*	not Tier I	not Tier I	(Czech Republic) Novotná (Latvia) Savchenko-Neiland*	(United States) G. Fernández (Belarus) Zvereva*	(United States) G. Fernández (Belarus) Zvereva*	(Czech Republic) Novotná (Spain) Sánchez Vicario*	(Latvia) Savchenko-Neiland (Czech Republic) Novotná*	(United States) Navratilova (Czech Republic) Suková*	(United States) Adams (Netherlands) Bollegraf*	(United States) Garrison (United States) Navratilova	(United States) G. Fernández (Belarus) Zvereva*	not held
1994	(United States) G. Fernández (Belarus) Zvereva*	(United States) G. Fernández (Belarus) Zvereva*	(United States) G. Fernández (Belarus) Zvereva*	(Czech Republic) Novotná (Spain) Sánchez Vicario*	not Tier I	not Tier I	(United States) G. Fernández (Belarus) Zvereva*	(United States) McNeil (Spain) Sánchez Vicario*	(United States) G. Fernández (Belarus) Zvereva*	(United States) G. Fernández (Belarus) Zvereva*	(United States) McGrath (Spain) Sánchez Vicario*	(Australia) Sayers-Smylie (United States) Shriver*	(United States) G. Fernández (Belarus) Zvereva*	(Netherlands) Bollegraf (United States) Navratilova*	(United States) G. Fernández (Belarus) Zvereva*	not held
1995	(Czech Republic) Novotná (Spain) Sánchez Vicario*	(United States) G. Fernández (Belarus) Zvereva*	(Czech Republic) Novotná (Spain) Sánchez Vicario*	(United States) G. Fernández (Belarus) Zvereva*	not Tier I	not Tier I	(Czech Republic) Novotná (Spain) Sánchez Vicario*	(United States) Arendt (Netherlands) Bollegraf*	(South Africa) Coetzer (Argentina) Gorrochategui*	(United States) G. Fernández (Belarus) Zvereva*	(Argentina) Sabatini (Netherlands) Schultz-McCarthy*	(United States) G. Fernández (Belarus) Zvereva*	(United States) McNeil (Czechoslovakia) Suková*	(United States) Arendt (Netherlands) Bollegraf*	(Czech Republic) Novotná (Spain) Sánchez Vicario*	not held
1996	(United States) Rubin (Spain) Sánchez Vicario*	(United States) Davenport (United States) M. J. Fernández*	(Switzerland) Hingis (Czech Republic) Suková*	(United States) G. Fernández (Belarus) Zvereva*	not Tier I	(United States) Rubin (Netherlands) Schultz-McCarthy*	(Czech Republic) Novotná (Spain) Sánchez Vicario*	(Czech Republic) Novotná (Spain) Sánchez Vicario*	(United States) McGrath (Latvia) Savchenko-Neiland*	(Spain) Sánchez Vicario (Romania) Spîrlea*	(Spain) Sánchez Vicario (Latvia) Savchenko-Neiland*	(United States) G. Fernández (Belarus) Zvereva*	not Tier I	(Switzerland) Hingis (Czech Republic) Suková*	(United States) Davenport (United States) M. J. Fernández*	(United States) G. Fernández (United States) M. J. Fernández*
1997	(Switzerland) Hingis (Belarus) Zvereva*	(United States) G. Fernández (Belarus) Zvereva*	(United States) G. Fernández (Belarus) Zvereva*	(United States) Davenport (Czech Republic) Novotná*	not Tier I	(United States) Davenport (Belarus) Zvereva*	(Spain) Sánchez Vicario (Belarus) Zvereva*	(United States) M. J. Fernández (Switzerland) Hingis*	(United States) Davenport (Czech Republic) Novotná*	(United States) Arendt (Netherlands) Bollegraf*	(Indonesia) Basuki (Netherlands) Vis*	(United States) Davenport (Belarus) Zvereva*	(Spain) Sánchez Vicario (Belarus) Zvereva*	(Switzerland) Hingis (Spain) Sánchez Vicario*	(United States) Davenport (Czech Republic) Novotná*	not held
1998	(Switzerland) Hingis (Croatia) Lučić-Baroni*	(Switzerland) Hingis (Czech Republic) Novotná*	(Switzerland) Hingis (Czech Republic) Novotná*	(Switzerland) Hingis (Czech Republic) Novotná*	not Tier I	(United States) Davenport (Belarus) Zvereva*	(Switzerland) Hingis (Czech Republic) Novotná*	(Spain) Martínez (Argentina) Tarabini*	(United States) Davenport (Belarus) Zvereva*	(Spain) Pascual (Argentina) Suárez*	(Switzerland) Hingis (Czech Republic) Novotná*	(Switzerland) Hingis (Croatia) Lučić-Baroni*	(France) Pierce (Belarus) Zvereva*	(United States) S. Williams (United States) V. Williams*	(United States) Davenport (Belarus) Zvereva*	not held
1999	(Switzerland) Hingis (Russia) Kournikova*	(United States) S. Williams (United States) V. Williams*	(United States) Davenport (United States) Morariu*	(United States) S. Williams (United States) V. Williams*	not Tier I	(Switzerland) Hingis (Russia) Kournikova*	(Switzerland) Hingis (Czech Republic) Novotná*	(Russia) Likhovtseva (Czech Republic) Novotná*	(France) Fusai (France) Tauziat*	(Switzerland) Hingis (Russia) Kournikova*	(Czech Republic) Novotná (France) Pierce*	(United States) Davenport (Belarus) Zvereva*	(United States) Raymond (Australia) Stubbs*	(United States) Raymond (Australia) Stubbs*	(Switzerland) Hingis (Russia) Kournikova*	not held
2000	(United States) Raymond (Australia) Stubbs*	(Switzerland) Hingis (France) Pierce*	(United States) S. Williams (United States) V. Williams*	(France) Halard-Decugis (Japan) Sugiyama*	not Tier I	(United States) Davenport (United States) Morariu*	(France) Halard-Decugis (Japan) Sugiyama*	(Spain) Pascual (Argentina) Suárez*	(Spain) Martínez (Spain) Sánchez Vicario*	(United States) Raymond (Australia) Stubbs*	(Switzerland) Hingis (France) Tauziat*	(Switzerland) Hingis (France) Pierce*	(France) Halard-Decugis (Japan) Sugiyama*	(Switzerland) Hingis (Russia) Kournikova*	(Switzerland) Hingis (Russia) Kournikova*	(United States) S. Williams (United States) V. Williams*
2001	(United States) S. Williams (United States) V. Williams*	(Spain) Pascual (Argentina) Suárez*	(United States) Raymond (Australia) Stubbs*	(United States) Raymond (Australia) Stubbs*	not Tier I	(United States) Arendt (Japan) Sugiyama*	(Spain) Sánchez Vicario (France) Tauziat*	(United States) Raymond (Australia) Stubbs*	(Belgium) Callens (United States) Shaughnessy*	(Zimbabwe) Black (Russia) Likhovtseva*	(United States) Po-Messerli (Australia) Pratt*	(United States) Raymond (Australia) Stubbs*	(Switzerland) Hingis (Russia) Kournikova*	(United States) Davenport (United States) Raymond*	(United States) Raymond (Australia) Stubbs*	not held
2002	(Switzerland) Hingis (Russia) Kournikova*	(Spain) Pascual (Argentina) Suárez*	(United States) S. Williams (United States) V. Williams*	(Spain) Pascual (Argentina) Suárez*	not Tier I	(United States) Raymond (Australia) Stubbs*	(United States) Raymond (Australia) Stubbs*	(United States) Raymond (Australia) Stubbs*	(Russia) Dementieva (Slovakia) Husárová*	(Spain) Pascual (Argentina) Suárez*	(Spain) Pascual (Argentina) Suárez*	(United States) Raymond (Australia) Stubbs*	(Russia) Dementieva (Slovakia) Husárová*	(Russia) Bovina (Belgium) Henin*	(Russia) Dementieva (Slovakia) Husárová*	not held
2003	(United States) S. Williams (United States) V. Williams*	(Belgium) Clijsters (Japan) Sugiyama*	(Belgium) Clijsters (Japan) Sugiyama*	(Spain) Pascual (Argentina) Suárez*	not Tier I	(United States) Davenport (United States) Raymond*	(South Africa) Huber (Bulgaria) Mag. Maleeva*	(Spain) Pascual (Argentina) Suárez	(Spain) Pascual (Argentina) Suárez*	(Russia) Kuznetsova (United States) Navratilova*	(Russia) Kuznetsova (United States) Navratilova*	(Russia) Bovina (Australia) Stubbs*	(Russia) Petrova (United States) Shaughnessy*	(Belgium) Clijsters (Japan) Sugiyama*	(Spain) Pascual (Argentina) Suárez*	not held
2004	(Spain) Pascual (Argentina) Suárez*	(Spain) Pascual (Argentina) Suárez*	(Zimbabwe) Black (Australia) Stubbs*	(Spain) Pascual (Argentina) Suárez*	(Zimbabwe) Black (Australia) Stubbs*	(Spain) Pascual (Argentina) Suárez*	(Russia) Petrova (United States) Shaughnessy*	(Spain) Pascual (Argentina) Suárez*	(Russia) Petrova (United States) Shaughnessy*	(Russia) Petrova (United States) Shaughnessy*	(Japan) Asagoe (Japan) Sugiyama*	(Zimbabwe) Black (Australia) Stubbs*	(Russia) Myskina (Russia) Zvonareva*	(Zimbabwe) Black (Australia) Stubbs*	(Russia) Petrova (United States) Shaughnessy*	(China) T. Li (China) Sun*
2005	(Russia) Kuznetsova (Australia) Molik*	(Spain) Pascual (Argentina) Suárez*	(Zimbabwe) Black (South Africa) Huber*	(United States) Raymond (Australia) Stosur*	(Spain) Martínez (Spain) Pascual*	(Spain) Pascual (Argentina) Suárez*	(Russia) Kuznetsova (Australia) Molik*	(Spain) Martínez (Spain) Pascual*	(Russia) Likhovtseva (Russia) Zvonareva*	(Zimbabwe) Black (South Africa) Huber*	(Germany) Grönefeld (United States) Navratilova*	(Slovakia) Husárová (Russia) Likhovtseva*	(United States) Raymond (Australia) Stosur*	(Zimbabwe) Black (Australia) Stubbs*	(United States) Raymond (Australia) Stosur*	not held
2006	(China) Yan (China) Zheng*	(United States) Raymond (Australia) Stosur*	(China) Yan (China) Zheng*	(France) Dechy (Russia) Zvonareva*	(Zimbabwe) Black (Australia) Stubbs*	(United States) Raymond (Australia) Stosur*	(United States) Raymond (Australia) Stosur*	(United States) Raymond (Australia) Stosur*	(China) Yan (China) Zheng*	(Slovakia) Hantuchová (Japan) Sugiyama*	(United States) Navratilova (Russia) Petrova*	(United States) Raymond (Australia) Stosur*	(Czech Republic) Peschke (Italy) Schiavone*	(Zimbabwe) Black (Australia) Stubbs*	(United States) Raymond (Australia) Stosur*	not held
2007	(Zimbabwe) Black (South Africa) Huber*	(Australia) Molik (Italy) Santangelo*	(Zimbabwe) Black (South Africa) Huber*	(France) Dechy (Russia) Safina*	(Zimbabwe) Black (United States) Huber*	(United States) Raymond (Australia) Stosur*	(United States) Raymond (Australia) Stosur*	(China) Yan (China) Zheng*	(United States) Raymond (Australia) Stosur*	(France) Dechy (Italy) Santangelo*	(Slovenia) Srebotnik (Japan) Sugiyama*	(United States) Raymond (Australia) Stosur*	(Zimbabwe) Black (United States) Huber*	(Czech Republic) Peschke (Australia) Stubbs*	(Zimbabwe) Black (United States) Huber*	not held
2008	(Ukraine) A. Bondarenko (Ukraine) K. Bondarenko*	(Spain) Medina Garrigues (Spain) Pascual*	(United States) S. Williams (United States) V. Williams*	(Zimbabwe) Black (United States) Huber*	(Czech Republic) Peschke (Australia) Stubbs*	(Russia) Safina (Russia) Vesnina*	(Slovenia) Srebotnik (Japan) Sugiyama*	(Slovenia) Srebotnik (Japan) Sugiyama*	(Zimbabwe) Black (United States) Huber*	(Chinese Taipei) L. Chan (Chinese Taipei) Chuang*	(Zimbabwe) Black (United States) Huber*	(United States) King (Russia) Petrova*	(Russia) Petrova (Slovenia) Srebotnik*	not Tier I	(Zimbabwe) Black (United States) Huber*	(United States) S. Williams (United States) V. Williams*
					Premier Mandatory				Premier 5					defunct		
					IW	MI	MA	BG	DU/DO	RO	CA	CI	TO/WU	defunct		
2009	(United States) S. Williams (United States) V. Williams*	(Spain) Medina Garrigues (Spain) Pascual*	(United States) S. Williams (United States) V. Williams*	(United States) S. Williams (United States) V. Williams*	(Belarus) Azarenka (Russia) Zvonareva*	(Russia) Kuznetsova (France) Mauresmo*	(Zimbabwe) Black (United States) Huber*	(Chinese Taipei) Hsieh (China) Peng*	(Zimbabwe) Black (United States) Huber*	(Chinese Taipei) Hsieh (China) Peng*	(Spain) Vives (Spain) Martínez Sánchez*	(Zimbabwe) Black (United States) Huber*	(Russia) Kleybanova (Italy) Schiavone*	defunct	(Spain) Vives (Spain) Martínez Sánchez*	not held
2010	(United States) S. Williams (United States) V. Williams*	(United States) S. Williams (United States) V. Williams*	(United States) King (Kazakhstan) Shvedova*	(United States) King (Kazakhstan) Shvedova*	(Czech Republic) Peschke (Slovenia) Srebotnik*	(Argentina) Dulko (Italy) Pennetta*	(United States) S. Williams (United States) V. Williams*	(Belarus) Govortsova (Chinese Taipei) Chuang*	(Spain) Vives (Spain) Martínez Sánchez*	(Argentina) Dulko (Italy) Pennetta*	(Argentina) Dulko (Italy) Pennetta*	(Belarus) Azarenka (Russia) Kirilenko*	(Czech Republic) Benešová (Czech Republic) Strýcová*	defunct	(Argentina) Dulko (Italy) Pennetta*	not held
2011	(Argentina) Dulko (Italy) Pennetta*	(Czech Republic) Hlaváčková (Czech Republic) Hradecká*	(Czech Republic) Peschke (Slovenia) Srebotnik*	(United States) Huber (United States) Raymond*	(India) Mirza (Russia) Vesnina*	(Slovakia) Hantuchová (Poland) Radwańska*	(Belarus) Azarenka (Russia) Kirilenko*	(Czech Republic) Peschke (Slovenia) Srebotnik*	(United States) Huber (Spain) Martínez Sánchez*	(China) Peng (China) Zheng*	(United States) Huber (United States) Raymond*	(United States) King (Kazakhstan) Shvedova*	(United States) Huber (United States) Raymond*	defunct	(United States) Huber (United States) Raymond*	not held
2012	(Russia) Kuznetsova (Russia) Zvonareva*	(Italy) Errani (Italy) Vinci*	(United States) S. Williams (United States) V. Williams*	(Italy) Errani (Italy) Vinci*	(United States) Huber (United States) Raymond*	(Russia) Kirilenko (Russia) Petrova*	(Italy) Errani (Italy) Vinci*	(Russia) Makarova (Russia) Vesnina*	(United States) Huber (United States) Raymond*	(Italy) Errani (Italy) Vinci*	(Poland) Jans-Ignacik (France) Mladenovic*	(Czech Republic) Hlaváčková (Czech Republic) Hradecká*	(United States) Kops-Jones (United States) Spears*	defunct	(Russia) Kirilenko (Russia) Petrova*	(United States) S. Williams (United States) V. Williams*
2013	(Italy) Errani (Italy) Vinci*	(Russia) Makarova (Russia) Vesnina*	(Chinese Taipei) Hsieh (China) Peng*	(Czech Republic) Hlaváčková (Czech Republic) Hradecká*	(Russia) Makarova (Russia) Vesnina*	(Russia) Petrova (Slovenia) Srebotnik*	(Russia) Pavlyuchenkova (Czech Republic) Šafářová*	(Zimbabwe) Black (India) Mirza*	(Italy) Errani (Italy) Vinci*	(Chinese Taipei) Hsieh (China) Peng*	(Serbia) Janković (Slovenia) Srebotnik*	(Chinese Taipei) Hsieh (China) Peng*	(Zimbabwe) Black (India) Mirza*	defunct	(Chinese Taipei) Hsieh (China) Peng*	not held
2014	(Italy) Errani (Italy) Vinci*	(Chinese Taipei) Hsieh (China) Peng*	(Italy) Errani (Italy) Vinci*	(Russia) Makarova (Russia) Vesnina*	(Chinese Taipei) Hsieh (China) Peng*	(Switzerland) Hingis (Germany) Lisicki*	(Italy) Errani (Italy) Vinci*	(Czech Republic) Hlaváčková (China) Peng*	(Chinese Taipei) Hsieh (China) Peng*	(Czech Republic) Peschke (Slovenia) Srebotnik*	(Italy) Errani (Italy) Vinci*	(United States) Kops-Jones (United States) Spears*	(Switzerland) Hingis (Italy) Pennetta*	defunct	(Zimbabwe) Black (India) Mirza*	not held
2015	(United States) Mattek-Sands (Czech Republic) Šafářová*	(United States) Mattek-Sands (Czech Republic) Šafářová*	(Switzerland) Hingis (India) Mirza*	(Switzerland) Hingis (India) Mirza*	(Switzerland) Hingis (India) Mirza*	(Switzerland) Hingis (India) Mirza*	(Australia) Dellacqua (Kazakhstan) Shvedova*	(Switzerland) Hingis (India) Mirza*	(Hungary) Babos (France) Mladenovic*	(Hungary) Babos (France) Mladenovic*	(United States) Mattek-Sands (Czech Republic) Šafářová*	(Chinese Taipei) H.-c. Chan (Chinese Taipei) L. Chan*	(Switzerland) Hingis (India) Mirza*	defunct	(Switzerland) Hingis (India) Mirza*	not held
2016	(Switzerland) Hingis (India) Mirza*	(France) Garcia (France) Mladenovic*	(United States) S. Williams (United States) V. Williams*	(United States) Mattek-Sands (Czech Republic) Šafářová*	(United States) Mattek-Sands (United States) Vandeweghe*	(United States) Mattek-Sands (Czech Republic) Šafářová*	(France) Garcia (France) Mladenovic*	(United States) Mattek-Sands (Czech Republic) Šafářová*	(Chinese Taipei) H.-c. Chan (Chinese Taipei) L. Chan*	(Switzerland) Hingis (India) Mirza*	(Russia) Makarova (Russia) Vesnina*	(India) Mirza (Czech Republic) Strýcová*	(United States) Mattek-Sands (Czech Republic) Šafářová*	defunct	(Russia) Makarova (Russia) Vesnina*	(Russia) Makarova (Russia) Vesnina*
2017	(United States) Mattek-Sands (Czech Republic) Šafářová*	(United States) Mattek-Sands (Czech Republic) Šafářová*	(Russia) Makarova (Russia) Vesnina*	(Chinese Taipei) L. Chan (Switzerland) Hingis*	(Chinese Taipei) L. Chan (Switzerland) Hingis*	(Canada) Dabrowski (China) Xu*	(Chinese Taipei) L. Chan (Switzerland) Hingis*	(Chinese Taipei) L. Chan (Switzerland) Hingis*	(Russia) Makarova (Russia) Vesnina*	(Switzerland) Hingis (Chinese Taipei) L. Chan*	(Russia) Makarova (Russia) Vesnina*	(Chinese Taipei) L. Chan (Switzerland) Hingis*	(Chinese Taipei) L. Chan (Switzerland) Hingis*	defunct	(Hungary) Babos (Czech Republic) Hlaváčková*	not held
2018	(Hungary) Babos (France) Mladenovic*	(Czech Republic) Krejčíková (Czech Republic) Siniaková*	(Czech Republic) Krejčíková (Czech Republic) Siniaková*	(Australia) Barty (United States) Vandeweghe*	(Chinese Taipei) Hsieh (Czech Republic) Strýcová*	(Australia) Barty (United States) Vandeweghe*	(Russia) Makarova (Russia) Vesnina*	(Czech Republic) Sestini Hlaváčková (Czech Republic) Strýcová*	(Canada) Dabrowski (Latvia) Ostapenko*	(Australia) Barty (Netherlands) Schuurs*	(Australia) Barty (Netherlands) Schuurs*	(Czech Republic) Hradecká (Russia) Makarova*	(Belgium) Mertens (Netherlands) Schuurs*	defunct	(Hungary) Babos (France) Mladenovic*	not held
2019	(Australia) Stosur (China) Zhang*	(Hungary) Babos (France) Mladenovic*	(Chinese Taipei) Hsieh (Czech Republic) Strýcová*	(Belgium) Mertens (Belarus) Sabalenka*	(Belgium) Mertens (Belarus) Sabalenka*	(Belgium) Mertens (Belarus) Sabalenka*	(Chinese Taipei) Hsieh (Czech Republic) Strýcová*	(United States) Kenin (United States) Mattek-Sands*	(Chinese Taipei) Hsieh (Czech Republic) Strýcová*	(Belarus) Azarenka (Australia) Barty*	(Czech Republic) Krejčíková (Czech Republic) Siniaková*	(Czech Republic) Hradecká (Slovenia) Klepač*	(China) Yingying (Russia) Kudermetova*	defunct	(Hungary) Babos (France) Mladenovic*	not held
2020	(Hungary) Babos (France) Mladenovic*	(Hungary) Babos (France) Mladenovic*	not held (Note: not held due to the COVID-19 pandemic.)	(Germany) Siegemund (Russia) Zvonareva*	not held due to the COVID-19 pandemic				(Chinese Taipei) Hsieh (Czech Republic) Strýcová*	(Chinese Taipei) Hsieh (Czech Republic) Strýcová*	not held	(Czech Republic) Peschke (Netherlands) Schuurs*	not held	defunct	not held	not held
					WTA 1000 mandatory				WTA 1000 non-mandatory					defunct		
					IW	MI	MA	BG	DU/DO	RO	CA	CI	WU/GU	defunct		
2021	(Belgium) Mertens (Belarus) Sabalenka*	(Czech Republic) Krejčíková (Czech Republic) Siniaková*	(Chinese Taipei) Hsieh (Belgium) Mertens*	(Australia) Stosur (China) Zhang*	(Chinese Taipei) Hsieh (Belgium) Mertens*	(Japan) Aoyama (Japan) Shibahara*	(Czech Republic) Krejčíková (Czech Republic) Siniaková*	not held	(Chile) Guarachi (Croatia) Jurak*	(Canada) Fichman (Mexico) Olmos*	(Canada) Dabrowski (Brazil) Stefani*	(Australia) Stosur (China) Zhang*	not held	defunct	(Czech Republic) Krejčíková (Czech Republic) Siniaková*	(Czech Republic) Krejčíková (Czech Republic) Siniaková*
2022	(Czech Republic) Krejčíková (Czech Republic) Siniaková*	(France) Garcia (France) Mladenovic*	(Czech Republic) Krejčíková (Czech Republic) Siniaková*	(Czech Republic) Krejčíková (Czech Republic) Siniaková*	(China) Xu (China) Yang*	(Germany) Siegemund (Note: On 1 March 2022, the WTA announced that players from Russia and Belarus will not be allowed to compete under their nations' names or flags following the 2022 Russian invasion of Ukraine.) Zvonareva*	(Canada) Dabrowski (Mexico) Olmos*	not held	(United States) Gauff (United States) Pegula*	Kudermetova; Pavlyuchenkova*	(United States) Gauff (United States) Pegula*	(Ukraine) Kichenok (Latvia) Ostapenko*	(Australia) Sanders (Brazil) Stefani*	defunct	Kudermetova (Belgium) Mertens*	not held
2023	(Czech Republic) Krejčíková (Czech Republic) Siniaková*	(Chinese Taipei) Hsieh (China) Wang*	(Chinese Taipei) Hsieh (Czech Republic) Strýcová*	(Canada) Dabrowski (New Zealand) Routliffe*	(Czech Republic) Krejčíková (Czech Republic) Siniaková*	(United States) Gauff (United States) Pegula*	Azarenka (Brazil) Haddad Maia*	(Czech Republic) Bouzková (Spain) Sorribes Tormo*	Kudermetova; Samsonova*	(Australia) Hunter (Belgium) Mertens*	(Japan) Aoyama (Japan) Shibahara*	(United States) Parks (United States) Townsend*	(Australia) Hunter (Belgium) Mertens*	defunct	(Germany) Siegemund; Zvonareva*	not held
					WTA 1000 Mandatory											
					DO	DU	IW	MI	MA	RO	CA	CI	BG	WU		
2024	(Chinese Taipei) Hsieh (Belgium) Mertens*	(United States) Gauff (Czech Republic) Siniaková*	(Czech Republic) Siniaková (United States) Townsend*	(Ukraine) Kichenok (Latvia) Ostapenko*	(Netherlands) Schuurs (Brazil) Stefani*	(Australia) Hunter (Czech Republic) Siniaková*	(Chinese Taipei) Hsieh (Belgium) Mertens*	(United States) Kenin (United States) Mattek-Sands*	(Spain) Bucșa (Spain) Sorribes Tormo*	(Italy) Errani (Italy) Paolini*	(United States) Dolehide (United States) Krawczyk*	(United States) Muhammad (New Zealand) Routliffe*	(Italy) Errani (Italy) Paolini*	(Kazakhstan) Danilina; Khromacheva*	(Canada) Dabrowski (New Zealand) Routliffe*	(Italy) Errani (Italy) Paolini*
2025	(Czech Republic) Siniaková (United States) Townsend*	(Italy) Errani (Italy) Paolini*	Kudermetova (Belgium) Mertens*	(Canada) Dabrowski (New Zealand) Routliffe*	(Italy) Errani (Italy) Paolini*	(Czech Republic) Siniaková (United States) Townsend*	(United States) Muhammad (Netherlands) Schuurs*	Andreeva; Shnaider*	(Romania) Cîrstea; Kalinskaya*	(Italy) Errani (Italy) Paolini*	(United States) Gauff (United States) Kessler*	(Canada) Dabrowski (New Zealand) Routliffe*	(Italy) Errani (Italy) Paolini*	(Australia) Hunter (Czech Republic) Siniaková*	Kudermetova (Belgium) Mertens*	not held
2026	(Belgium) Mertens (China) Zhang*	(Czech Republic) Siniaková (United States) Townsend*	(China) Guo (France) Mladenovic*	(Czech Republic) Siniaková (United States) Townsend*	(Kazakhstan) Danilina (Serbia) Krunić*	(Canada) Dabrowski (Brazil) Stefani*	(Czech Republic) Siniaková (United States) Townsend*	(Czech Republic) Siniaková (United States) Townsend*	(Czech Republic) Siniaková (United States) Townsend*	Andreeva; Shnaider*	(Czech Republic) Siniaková (China) Zhang*	(Czech Republic) Bouzková (Czech Republic) Nosková*				not held

== Titles leaders ==
- The leaders in these tournaments since 1990 are (10+ total titles):
- Important note: by setting 1990 as the cut-off point, this list excludes many notable champions in high level tournaments from the previous years. Totals including titles won before 1990 are in brackets.

Active players and records since 1990 are denoted in bold.

Titles	Player	Majors	Tier I	Premier Mandatory/5	WTA 1000	WTA Finals	Olympic Games
43	(Soviet Union) / (Commonwealth of Independent States) / (Belarus) / (Belarus) Natasha Zvereva	**17** (18)	**23**	—	—	3	—
42	(Switzerland) Martina Hingis	13	13	**13**	—	3	—
34	(United States) Lisa Raymond	6	20	4	—	**4**	—
29	(United States) Gigi Fernández	16 (17)	9 (10)	—	—	2	2
27	(Czechoslovakia) Jana Novotná	11 (12)	14	—	—	2	—
25	(Zimbabwe) Cara Black	5	12	5	—	3	—
24	(Spain) Arantxa Sánchez Vicario	6	16	—	—	2	—
24	(Australia) Rennae Stubbs	4	19	—	—	1	—
24	(Czech Republic) **Kateřina Siniaková**	12	—	1	**9**	1	1
22	(Spain) Virginia Ruano Pascual	10	11	—	—	1	—
22	(South Africa) Liezel Huber	5	6	8	—	3	—
21	(Chinese Taipei) **Hsieh Su-wei**	7	—	11	2	1	—
19	(United States) Serena Williams	14	1	1	—	—	**3**
19	(United States) **Venus Williams**	14	1	1	—	—	**3**
18	(Argentina) Paola Suárez	8	9	—	—	1	—
17	(Italy) **Sara Errani**	6	—	5	5	—	1
16	(Australia) Samantha Stosur	4	9	—	1	2	—
15	(United States) Lindsay Davenport	3	9	—	—	3	—
15	(Belgium) **Elise Mertens**	6	—	3	4	2	—
14	(India) Sania Mirza	3	9	—	—	2	—
13	(Russia) Elena Vesnina	3	1	7	—	1	1
13	(France) **Kristina Mladenovic**	7	—	4	—	2	—
12	(Czechoslovakia) Helena Suková	6 (9)	5	—	—	1	—
12	(Japan) Ai Sugiyama	3	9	—	—	—	—
12	(Russia) Ekaterina Makarova	3	—	7	—	1	1
12	(Czech Republic) **Barbora Krejčíková**	7	—	1	2	1	1
12	(United States) **Bethanie Mattek-Sands**	5	—	6	1	—	—
11	(United States) Martina Navratilova	1 (31)	9	—	—	1 (13)	—
11	(Soviet Union) / (Latvia) Larisa Neiland	1 (2)	10	—	—	—	—
11	(Russia) Nadia Petrova	—	7	2	—	2	
11	(China) Peng Shuai	2	—	8	—	1	—
10	(Slovenia) Katarina Srebotnik	1	4	5	—	—	—
10	(Chinese Taipei) **Latisha Chan**	1	1	8	—	—	—
10	(Italy) Roberta Vinci	5	—	5	—	—	—
10	(Czech Republic) Lucie Šafářová	5	5	—	—	—	—
10	(Czech Republic) **Barbora Strýcová**	2	—	8	—	—	—

== Calendar sweeps ==
- **Back-to-back** titles in a calendar year (three minimum).
- Currently active calendar combinations in **bold.**

Combination	Winner	Year
Rome—Berlin—French Open	(United States) Gigi Fernández (Belarus) Natasha Zvereva	1994
Australian Open—Tokyo—Indian Wells—Miami	(Belarus) Natasha Zvereva	1997
Madrid—Rome—French Open	(Italy) Sara Errani (Italy) Roberta Vinci	2012
Wuhan—Beijing—WTA Finals	(Switzerland) Martina Hingis (India) Sania Mirza	2015

== See also ==
- List of WTA Tour top-level tournament singles champions
- List of Grand Slam women's doubles champions
- WTA Tier I tournaments
- List of Olympic medalists in tennis
- List of ATP Tour top-level tournament singles champions
- List of ATP Tour top-level tournament doubles champions
