= 1996 European Indoors =

- Date: 14–20 October
- Edition: 13th
- Category: Tier I
- Draw: 28S / 16D
- Prize money: $926,250
- Surface: Hard / indoor
- Location: Zürich, Switzerland
- Venue: Hallenstadion

Champions

Singles
- (Czech Republic) Jana Novotná

Doubles
- (Switzerland) Martina Hingis / (Czech Republic) Helena Suková
← 1995 ·	Zurich Open	· 1997 →

The 1996 European Indoors was a women's tennis tournament played on indoor hard courts at the Hallenstadion in Zürich in Switzerland that was part of Tier I of the 1996 WTA Tour. The tournament was held from 14 October through 20 October 1996. Fourth-seeded Jana Novotná won the singles titles and earned $150,000 first-prize money.

Gabriela Sabatini announced her retirement shortly after losing her first-round match against Jennifer Capriati.

== Finals ==
=== Singles ===
(Czech Republic) Jana Novotná defeated (Switzerland) Martina Hingis 6–2, 6–2

- It was Novotná's 2nd title of the year and the 13th of her career.

=== Doubles ===
(Switzerland) Martina Hingis / (Czech Republic) Helena Suková defeated (United States) Nicole Arendt / (Belarus) Natasha Zvereva 7–5, 6–4

- It was Hingis' 3rd title of the year and the 4th of her career. It was Suková's 4th title of the year and the 76th of her career.
