= 1994 European Indoors =

- Date: 3–9 October
- Edition: 11th
- Category: Tier I
- Draw: 32S / 16D
- Prize money: $750,000
- Surface: Carpet / indoor
- Location: Zürich, Switzerland
- Venue: Saalsporthalle Allmend

Champions

Singles
- (Bulgaria) Magdalena Maleeva

Doubles
- (Netherlands) Manon Bollegraf (United States) Martina Navratilova
← 1993 ·	Zurich Open	· 1995 →

The 1994 European Indoors was a women's tennis tournament played on indoor carpet courts at the Saalsporthalle Allmend in Zürich in Switzerland and was part of the 1994 WTA Tour. It was the 11th edition of the tournament and was held from 3 October through 9 October 1994. Fifth-seeded Magdalena Maleeva won the singles title, succeeding her retired sister Manuela Maleeva-Fragniere, and earning $150,000 in first-prize money.

== Finals ==
=== Singles ===
(Bulgaria) Magdalena Maleeva defeated (Belarus) Natasha Zvereva 7–5, 3–6, 6–4

- It was Maleeva's 2nd singles title of the year and the 3rd of her career.

=== Doubles ===
(Netherlands) Manon Bollegraf / (United States) Martina Navratilova defeated (United States) Patty Fendick / (United States) Meredith McGrath 7–6, 6–1
