= 1993 Barilla Indoors – Singles =

Singles
- 1993 Barilla Indoors

Final
- Champion: (Switzerland) Manuela Maleeva-Fragnière
- Runner-up: (United States) Martina Navratilova
- Score: 6–3, 7–6^{(7–1)}

Details
- Draw: 32 (4 Q / 2 WC)
- Seeds: 8

Events
Singles	Doubles
- Zurich Open

Manuela Maleeva-Fragnière won the title, defeating Martina Navratilova in the finals, 6–3, 7–6^{(7–1)}.

Steffi Graf was the defending champion, but chose not to participate.

== Seeds ==
1. (United States) Martina Navratilova (final)
2. (Czech Republic) Jana Novotná (first round)
3. (Switzerland) Manuela Maleeva-Fragnière (champion)
4. (Bulgaria) Magdalena Maleeva (semifinal)
5. (France) Nathalie Tauziat (quarterfinal)
6. (United States) Zina Garrison-Jackson (first round)
7. (Austria) Judith Wiesner (second round)
8. (Belarus) Natalia Zvereva (quarterfinal)

== Draw ==
Key

- Q = Qualifier
- WC = Wild card
- LL = Lucky loser
- Alt = Alternate
- ITF = ITF entry
- PR = Protected ranking
- SR = Special ranking
- SE = Special exempt
- JE = Junior exempt
- JR = Junior Accelerator Programme entrant
- CO = College Accelerator Programme entrant
- NG = Next Gen Accelerator Program entrant
- w/o = Walkover
- r = Retired
- d = Defaulted

=== Finals ===
Semifinals
1	(United States) Martina Navratilova	6	6
4	(Bulgaria) Magdalena Maleeva	3	4
3	(Switzerland) Manuela Maleeva-Fragnière	6	7
(Netherlands) Stephanie Rottier	3	6

Final
1	(United States) Martina Navratilova	3	6
3	(Switzerland) Manuela Maleeva-Fragnière	6	7

=== Top half ===
First round
1	(United States) M Navratilova	6	6
(Germany) B Rittner	4	1
(France) P Paradis-Mangon	4	3
Q	(Russia) E Makarova	6	6
(Netherlands) M Oremans	6	6
WC	(Netherlands) K Boogert	2	4
(Slovakia) R Zrubáková	6	3	4
7	(Austria) J Wiesner	4	6	6
4	(Bulgaria) M Maleeva	6	6
WC	(United Kingdom) J Durie	1	0
(United States) L McNeil	5	4
(United States) P Shriver	7	6
Q	(Slovakia) K Studeníková	5	3
(Croatia) I Majoli	7	6
Q	(Netherlands) M Bollegraf	6	2	6
5	(France) N Tauziat	4	6	7

Second round
1	(United States) M Navratilova	6	6
Q	(Russia) E Makarova	0	4
(Netherlands) M Oremans	6	6
7	(Austria) J Wiesner	2	4
4	(Bulgaria) M Maleeva	6	6
(United States) P Shriver	0	3
(Croatia) I Majoli	3	4
5	(France) N Tauziat	6	6

Quarterfinals
1	(United States) M Navratilova	6	6
(Netherlands) M Oremans	2	2
4	(Bulgaria) M Maleeva	6	6
5	(France) N Tauziat	4	1

Semifinals
1	(United States) Martina Navratilova	6	6
4	(Bulgaria) Magdalena Maleeva	3	4

=== Bottom half ===
First round
8	(Belarus) N Zvereva	6	6
LL	(Germany) W Probst	0	3
(Switzerland) E Zardo	2	6
(United States) G Fernández	6	7
(South Africa) R Nideffer	7	6
(United States) K Po	5	0
(Netherlands) B Schultz	4	2
3	(Switzerland) M Maleeva-Fragnière	6	6
6	(United States) Z Garrison-Jackson	6	6	3
(United States) P Fendick	7	3	6
(Ukraine) N Medvedeva	4	2
(Netherlands) S Rottier	6	6
(Austria) B Reinstadler	2	6	3
(Latvia) L Savchenko-Neiland	6	1	6
Q	(United States) S Cacic	2	7	6
2	(Czech Republic) J Novotná	6	5	1

Second round
8	(Belarus) N Zvereva	6	6
(United States) G Fernández	1	4
(South Africa) R Nideffer	2	1
3	(Switzerland) M Maleeva-Fragnière	6	6
(United States) P Fendick	4	2
(Netherlands) S Rottier	6	6
(Latvia) L Savchenko-Neiland	3	6	3
Q	(United States) S Cacic	6	1	6

Quarterfinals
8	(Belarus) N Zvereva	2	5
3	(Switzerland) M Maleeva-Fragnière	6	7
(Netherlands) S Rottier	6	6
Q	(United States) S Cacic	3	4

Semifinals
3	(Switzerland) Manuela Maleeva-Fragnière	6	7
(Netherlands) Stephanie Rottier	3	6
