= 1993 Barilla Indoors =

- Date: 4–10 October
- Edition: 10th
- Category: Tier I
- Draw: 32S / 16D
- Prize money: $750,000
- Surface: Carpet / indoor
- Location: Zürich, Switzerland
- Venue: Saalsporthalle Allmend

Champions

Singles
- (Switzerland) Manuela Maleeva-Fragnière

Doubles
- (United States) Zina Garrison-Jackson; (United States) Martina Navratilova
← 1992 ·	Zurich Open	· 1994 →

The 1993 Barilla Indoors was a women's tennis tournament played on indoor carpet courts at the Saalsporthalle Allmend in Zürich in Switzerland and was part of the 1993 WTA Tour. It was the 10th edition of the tournament, which had been upgraded from Tier II to Tier I, and was held from 4 October through 10 October 1993. Third-seeded Manuela Maleeva-Fragnière won the singles title and earned $150,000 first-prize money.

== Finals ==
=== Singles ===
(Switzerland) Manuela Maleeva-Fragnière defeated (United States) Martina Navratilova 6–3, 7–6^{(7–1)}

- It was Maleeva-Fragnière's 2nd singles title of the year and the 18th of her career.

=== Doubles ===
(United States) Zina Garrison-Jackson / (United States) Martina Navratilova defeated (United States) Gigi Fernández / (Belarus) Natasha Zvereva 6–3, 5–7, 6–3
