= 1995 European Indoors – Singles =

Singles
- 1995 European Indoors
- 1994 Champion: (Bulgaria) Magdalena Maleeva

Final
- Champion: (Croatia) Iva Majoli
- Runner-up: (France) Mary Pierce
- Score: 6–4, 6–4

Details
- Draw: 28
- Seeds: 8

Events
Singles	Doubles
← 1994 ·	Zurich Open	· 1996 →

Iva Majoli defeated Mary Pierce in the final, 6–4, 6–4 to win the singles tennis title at the 1995 European Indoor Championships.

Magdalena Maleeva was the defending champion, but withdrew in quarterfinals.

== Seeds ==
1. (Czech Republic) Jana Novotná (quarterfinals)
2. (France) Mary Pierce (final)
3. (Bulgaria) Magdalena Maleeva (quarterfinals, withdrew)
4. (Germany) Anke Huber (second round)
5. (United States) ~~Mary Joe Fernández~~ (withdrew)
6. (Belarus) Natasha Zvereva (first round)
7. (Croatia) Iva Majoli (champion)
8. (Netherlands) Brenda Schultz-McCarthy (quarterfinals)

== Draw ==
=== Key ===
- Q = Qualifier
- WC = Wild card
- LL = Lucky loser
- Alt = Alternate
- SE = Special exempt
- PR = Protected ranking
- ITF = ITF entry
- JE = Junior exempt
- w/o = Walkover
- r = Retired
- d = Defaulted
- SR = Special ranking

=== Finals ===
Semifinals
7	(Croatia) Iva Majoli	7^{7}	6
(United States) Chanda Rubin	6^{2}	0
Q	(South Africa) Mariaan de Swardt	1	4
2	(France) Mary Pierce	6	6

Final
7	(Croatia) Iva Majoli	6	6
2	(France) Mary Pierce	4	4

=== Top half ===
First round
Q	(Germany) P Begerow	6^{5}	6	3
(Netherlands) M Oremans	7^{7}	1	6
(France) N Tauziat	2	2
(United States) M Werdel-Witmeyer	6	6
Q	(Czech Republic) H Vildová	7	3	1
7	(Croatia) I Majoli	5	6	6
(United States) Z Garrison Jackson	6	6
Q	(Germany) M Kochta	1	3
(Switzerland) M Hingis	6	6^{1}	6
(United States) A Frazier	3	7^{7}	3
(United States) C Rubin	6	6
LL	(United States) K Adams	2	2

Second round
1	(Czech Republic) J Novotná	6^{5}	6	7
(Netherlands) M Oremans	7^{7}	3	5
(United States) M Werdel-Witmeyer	2	4
7	(Croatia) I Majoli	6	6
3	(Bulgaria) M Maleeva	3	7	6
(United States) Z Garrison Jackson	6	5	3
(Switzerland) M Hingis	2	1
(United States) C Rubin	6	6

Quarterfinals
1	(Czech Republic) J Novotná	6^{4}	6	3
7	(Croatia) I Majoli	7^{7}	3	6
3	(Bulgaria) M Maleeva
(United States) C Rubin	w/o

Semifinals
7	(Croatia) I Majoli	7^{7}	6
(United States) C Rubin	6^{2}	0

=== Bottom half ===
First round
6	(Belarus) N Zvereva	6	6^{6}	4
(Czech Republic) H Suková	3	7^{8}	6
(United States) L McNeil	6	4	4
(South Africa) J Kruger	4	6	6
Q	(South Africa) M de Swardt	7^{8}	6
WC	(Netherlands) K Boogert	6^{6}	2
8	(Netherlands) B Schultz-McCarthy	6	6
LL	(Belgium) N Feber	3	1
(Japan) N Sawamatsu	1	7^{7}	1
(United States) L Raymond	6	6^{0}	6
WC	(Switzerland) P Schnyder	2	6	6
(Romania) I Spîrlea	6	3	4

Second round
(Czech Republic) H Suková	3	5
(South Africa) J Kruger	6	7
Q	(South Africa) M de Swardt	6	3	6
4	(Germany) A Huber	4	6	4
8	(Netherlands) B Schultz-McCarthy	3	6	6
(United States) L Raymond	6	3	2
WC	(Switzerland) P Schnyder	1	3
2	(France) M Pierce	6	6

Quarterfinals
(South Africa) J Kruger	6^{1}	6^{4}
Q	(South Africa) M de Swardt	7^{7}	7^{7}
8	(Netherlands) B Schultz-McCarthy	6^{3}	4
2	(France) M Pierce	7^{7}	6

Semifinals
Q	(South Africa) M de Swardt	1	4
2	(France) M Pierce	6	6
