= 1997 European Indoors =

- Date: 12–19 October
- Edition: 14th
- Category: Tier I
- Draw: 28S / 16D
- Prize money: $926,250
- Surface: Hard / indoor
- Location: Zürich, Switzerland
- Venue: Schluefweg

Champions

Singles
- (United States) Lindsay Davenport

Doubles
- (Switzerland) Martina Hingis / (Spain) Arantxa Sánchez Vicario
← 1996 ·	Zurich Open	· 1998 →

The 1997 European Indoors was a women's tennis tournament played on indoor hard courts at the Schluefweg in Zürich in Switzerland that was part of Tier I of the 1997 WTA Tour. It was the 14th edition of the tournament and was held from 12 October until 19 October 1997. Fourth-seeded Lindsay Davenport won the singles title.

== Finals ==
=== Singles ===
(United States) Lindsay Davenport defeated (France) Nathalie Tauziat 7–6^{(7–3)}, 7–5

- It was Davenport's 5th singles title of the year and the 12th of her career.

=== Doubles ===
(Switzerland) Martina Hingis / (Spain) Arantxa Sánchez Vicario defeated (Latvia) Larisa Savchenko / (Czech Republic) Helena Suková 4–6, 6–4, 6–1

- It was Hingis' 8th and last doubles title of the year and the 11th of her career. It was Sánchez Vicario's 6th doubles title of the year and the 55th of her career.
