= 1997 European Indoors – Singles =

Singles
- 1997 European Indoors

Final
- Champion: (United States) Lindsay Davenport
- Runner-up: (France) Nathalie Tauziat
- Score: 7–6, 7–5

Details
- Draw: 28
- Seeds: 8

Events
Singles	Doubles
← 1996 ·	European Indoors	· 1998 →

Lindsay Davenport defeated Nathalie Tauziat in the final, 7–6, 7–5 to win the singles tennis title at the 1996 European Indoor Championships.

Jana Novotná was the defending champion, but lost in the semifinals to Davenport.

== Seeds ==
A champion seed is indicated in bold text while text in italics indicates the round in which that seed was eliminated. The top four seeds received a bye to the second round.

1. (Switzerland) Martina Hingis (quarterfinals)
2. (Czech Republic) Jana Novotná (semifinals)
3. (Croatia) Iva Majoli (second round)
4. (United States) **Lindsay Davenport (champion)**
5. (South Africa) Amanda Coetzer (second round)
6. (Germany) Anke Huber (second round)
7. (Romania) Irina Spîrlea (second round)
8. (Spain) Arantxa Sánchez Vicario (first round)

== Draw ==
=== Key ===
- Q = Qualifier
- WC = Wild card
- LL = Lucky loser
- Alt = Alternate
- ITF = ITF entry
- PR = Protected ranking
- SR = Special ranking
- SE = Special exempt
- JE = Junior exempt
- JR = Junior Accelerator Programme entrant
- CO = College Accelerator Programme entrant
- NG = Next Gen Accelerator Program entrant
- w/o = Walkover
- r = Retired
- d = Defaulted

=== Final ===
Final
	(France) Nathalie Tauziat	6	5
4	(United States) **Lindsay Davenport**	**7**	**7**

=== Section 1 ===
First round
(Slovakia) K Habšudová	2	6
LL	(France) **A-G Sidot**	**6**	**7**
(United States) **L Raymond**	**7**	**6**
(Czech Republic) H Suková	5	3
WC	(Switzerland) P Schnyder	6	3
5	(South Africa) **A Coetzer**	**7**	**6**
(Belgium) **S Appelmans**	**6**	6	**7**
(Netherlands) B Schultz-McCarthy	3	**7**	5
(France) **N Tauziat**	**6**	5	**7**
(United States) K Po	3	**7**	5
Q	(Belgium) **D Van Roost**	**7**	5	**6**
8	(Spain) A Sánchez Vicario	5	**7**	4

Second round
1	(Switzerland) **M Hingis**	**6**	**6**
LL	(France) A-G Sidot	3	2
(United States) **L Raymond**	**7**	**6**
5	(South Africa) A Coetzer	5	3
3	(Croatia) I Majoli	6	2
(Belgium) **S Appelmans**	**7**	**6**
(France) **N Tauziat**	**6**	6	**7**
Q	(Belgium) D Van Roost	3	**7**	6

Quarterfinals
1	(Switzerland) M Hingis	**6**	2	5
(United States) **L Raymond**	4	**6**	**7**
(Belgium) S Appelmans	**6**	1	5
(France) **N Tauziat**	4	**6**	**7**

Semifinals
(United States) L Raymond	3	5
(France) **N Tauziat**	**6**	**7**

=== Section 2 ===
First round
6	(Germany) **A Huber**	**7**	**6**
(United States) MJ Fernández	5	0
Q	(United States) **V Williams**	**6**	**6**
(Romania) R Dragomir	0	3
Q	(Netherlands) M Oremans	2	**6**	3
(Belarus) **N Zvereva**	**6**	2	**6**
7	(Romania) **I Spîrlea**	**6**	3	**6**
(Japan) N Sawamatsu	4	**6**	2
(Bulgaria) M Maleeva	3	3
Q	(Czech Republic) **S Kleinová**	**6**	**6**
(Japan) **A Sugiyama**	**6**	**1**
WC	(Austria) B Schett	2	0^{r}

Second round
6	(Germany) A Huber
Q	(United States) **V Williams**	**w/o**
(Belarus) N Zvereva	4	2^{r}
4	(United States) **L Davenport**	**6**	**2**
7	(Romania) I Spîrlea	**6**	1^{r}
Q	(Czech Republic) **S Kleinová**	3	**5**
(Japan) A Sugiyama	0	**7**	2
2	(Czech Republic) **J Novotná**	**6**	6	**6**

Quarterfinals
Q	(United States) V Williams	0	4
4	(United States) **L Davenport**	**6**	**6**
Q	(Czech Republic) S Kleinová	2	6
2	(Czech Republic) **J Novotná**	**6**	**7**

Semifinals
4	(United States) **L Davenport**	**6**	**6**
2	(Czech Republic) J Novotná	4	1

== Qualifying ==
=== Seeds ===
1. (United States) **Venus Williams (qualified)**
2. (Belgium) **Dominique Van Roost (qualified)**
3. (United States) Jennifer Capriati (first round)
4. (France) Anne-Gaëlle Sidot (qualifying competition, lucky loser)
5. (South Africa) Joannette Kruger (qualifying competition)
6. (Argentina) Florencia Labat (second round)
7. (Spain) Magüi Serna (first round)
8. (Czech Republic) Denisa Chládková (first round)

=== Qualifiers ===
1. **(United States) Venus Williams**
2. **(Czech Republic) Sandra Kleinová**
3. **(Netherlands) Miriam Oremans**
4. **(Belgium) Dominique Van Roost**

=== Lucky loser ===
1. **(France) Anne-Gaëlle Sidot**

=== Qualifying draw ===
==== First qualifier ====
First round
1	**(United States) Venus Williams**	**6**	**6**
(Czech Republic) Petra Langrová	2	1
**(Germany) Wiltrud Probst**	**6**	2	**7**
(France) Alexia Dechaume-Balleret	4	**6**	6
**(Latvia) Larisa Neiland**	**6**	4	**6**
(Russia) Tatiana Panova	4	**6**	3
**(Sweden) Åsa Carlsson**	**6**	**6**
8	(Czech Republic) Denisa Chládková	2	3

Second round
1	**(United States) Venus Williams**	**7**	**6**
(Germany) Wiltrud Probst	5	3
**(Latvia) Larisa Neiland**	**6**	**7**
(Sweden) Åsa Carlsson	4	6

Qualifying competition
1	**(United States) Venus Williams**	**6**	**6**
(Latvia) Larisa Neiland	1	2

==== Second qualifier ====
First round
4	**(France) Anne-Gaëlle Sidot**	**6**	**6**
(Poland) Aleksandra Olsza	0	0
WC	(Germany) Maja Živec-Škulj	6	5
**(Spain) María Sánchez Lorenzo**	**7**	**7**
(Czech Republic) Radka Bobková	0	4
**(Czech Republic) Sandra Kleinová**	**6**	**6**
(Germany) Andrea Glass	6	5
6	**(Argentina) Florencia Labat**	**7**	**7**

Second round
4	**(France) Anne-Gaëlle Sidot**	**6**	**6**
(Spain) María Sánchez Lorenzo	2	1
**(Czech Republic) Sandra Kleinová**	**6**	**7**
6	(Argentina) Florencia Labat	3	6

Qualifying competition
4	(France) Anne-Gaëlle Sidot	5	5
**(Czech Republic) Sandra Kleinová**	**7**	**7**

==== Third qualifier ====
First round
7	(Spain) Magüi Serna	3	3
WC	**(United States) Brie Rippner**	**6**	**6**
**(Italy) Rita Grande**	**6**	6	**6**
(Italy) Silvia Farina	2	**7**	3
WC	**(United States) Katrina Adams**	**7**	**6**
(Czech Republic) Ludmila Varmužová	6	4
**(Netherlands) Miriam Oremans**	**6**	**6**
3	(United States) Jennifer Capriati	1	3

Second round
WC	**(United States) Brie Rippner**	**6**	**7**
(Italy) Rita Grande	2	6
WC	(United States) Katrina Adams	2	6
**(Netherlands) Miriam Oremans**	**6**	**7**

Qualifying competition
WC	(United States) Brie Rippner	**7**	5	4
**(Netherlands) Miriam Oremans**	6	**7**	**6**

==== Fourth qualifier ====
First round
5	**(South Africa) Joannette Kruger**	**6**	**7**
(France) Alexandra Fusai	1	6
(Italy) Francesca Lubiani	**6**	1	2
**(United States) Annie Miller**	4	**6**	**6**
WC	**(United States) Serena Williams**	**6**	**6**
(Italy) Gloria Pizzichini	2	4
(Italy) Flora Perfetti	6	1
2	**(Belgium) Dominique Van Roost**	**7**	**6**

Second round
5	**(South Africa) Joannette Kruger**	**7**	**6**
(United States) Annie Miller	5	2
WC	(United States) Serena Williams	2	4
2	**(Belgium) Dominique Van Roost**	**6**	**6**

Qualifying competition
5	(South Africa) Joannette Kruger	4	1
2	**(Belgium) Dominique Van Roost**	**6**	**6**
