= 1994 European Indoors – Singles =

Singles
- 1994 European Indoors

Final
- Champion: (Bulgaria) Magdalena Maleeva
- Runner-up: (Belarus) Natasha Zvereva
- Score: 7–5, 3–6, 6–4

Details
- Draw: 32 (2WC/4Q)
- Seeds: 8

Events
Singles	Doubles
← 1993 ·	Zurich Open	· 1995 →

Magdalena Maleeva defeated Natasha Zvereva in the final, 7–5, 3–6, 6–4 to win the singles tennis title at the 1994 European Indoor Championships.

Manuela Maleeva-Fragnière was the reigning champion, but retired from professional tennis earlier in the season.

This event marked the first professional appearance of future world No. 1 and five-time singles major champion Martina Hingis, who was 14 years old. Hingis reached the second round before losing to Mary Pierce.

== Seeds ==
1. (United States) Martina Navratilova (quarterfinals)
2. (France) Mary Pierce (quarterfinals)
3. (Belarus) Natasha Zvereva (final)
4. (United States) Zina Garrison-Jackson (second round)
5. (Bulgaria) Magdalena Maleeva (champion)
6. (United States) Lori McNeil (quarterfinals)
7. (Croatia) Iva Majoli (second round)
8. (Argentina) Florencia Labat (first round)

== Draw ==
=== Key ===
- Q = Qualifier
- WC = Wild card
- LL = Lucky loser
- Alt = Alternate
- SE = Special exempt
- PR = Protected ranking
- ITF = ITF entry
- JE = Junior exempt
- w/o = Walkover
- r = Retired
- d = Defaulted
- SR = Special ranking

=== Finals ===
Semifinals
(Czech Republic) Helena Suková	2	5
5	(Bulgaria) Magdalena Maleeva	6	7
3	(Belarus) Natasha Zvereva	6	6
Q	(Netherlands) Miriam Oremans	0	2

Final
5	(Bulgaria) Magdalena Maleeva	7	3	6
3	(Belarus) Natasha Zvereva	5	6	4

=== Top half ===
First round
1	(United States) M Navratilova	7	4	6
(United States) A Grossman	5	6	1
(United States) M McGrath	4	6	6
(United States) K Po	6	0	2
(France) N Tauziat	7^{7}	6
(Netherlands) S Rottier	6^{4}	4
(Czech Republic) H Suková	6	6
8	(Argentina) F Labat	4	3
4	(United States) Z Garrison-Jackson	7^{7}	2	6
(Slovakia) K Habšudová	6^{4}	6	2
(Israel) A Smashnova	0	1
Q	(United States) S Stafford	6	6
(United States) M Werdel	6	6
(United States) S Cacic	3	4
(United States) P Shriver	5	6^{5}
5	(Bulgaria) M Maleeva	7	7^{7}

Second round
1	(United States) M Navratilova	7^{7}	6
(United States) M McGrath	6^{1}	3
(France) N Tauziat	4	4
(Czech Republic) H Suková	6	6
4	(United States) Z Garrison-Jackson	4	4
Q	(United States) S Stafford	6	6
(United States) M Werdel	1	1^{r}
5	(Bulgaria) M Maleeva	6	3

Quarterfinals
1	(United States) M Navratilova	5	6	4
(Czech Republic) H Suková	7	3	6
Q	(United States) S Stafford	3	1
5	(Bulgaria) M Maleeva	6	6

Semifinals
(Czech Republic) H Suková	2	5
5	(Bulgaria) M Maleeva	6	7

=== Bottom half ===
First round
6	(United States) L McNeil	2	6	7
Q	(United States) K Adams	6	3	5
(United States) L Raymond	6	3	7^{7}
(Netherlands) K Boogert	4	6	6^{1}
WC	(Slovakia) R Zrubáková	5	1
(Russia) E Makarova	7	6
(Ukraine) N Medvedeva	3	6^{12}
3	(Belarus) N Zvereva	6	7^{14}
7	(Croatia) I Majoli	6	6
(Australia) K Radford	2	1
Q	(Netherlands) C Vis	3	6^{5}
Q	(Netherlands) M Oremans	6	7^{7}
(United States) P Fendick	4	3
WC	(Switzerland) M Hingis	6	6
(Latvia) L Neiland	3	3
2	(France) M Pierce	6	6

Second round
6	(United States) L McNeil	6	6
(United States) L Raymond	1	2
(Russia) E Makarova	6	2	1
3	(Belarus) N Zvereva	4	6	6
7	(Croatia) I Majoli	5	1
Q	(Netherlands) M Oremans	7	6
WC	(Switzerland) M Hingis	4	0
2	(France) M Pierce	6	6

Quarterfinals
6	(United States) L McNeil	6^{5}	7	4
3	(Belarus) N Zvereva	7^{7}	5	6
Q	(Netherlands) M Oremans	6	6^{8}	6
2	(France) M Pierce	4	7^{10}	3

Semifinals
3	(Belarus) N Zvereva	6	6
Q	(Netherlands) M Oremans	0	2
