= 1995 European Indoors =

- Date: 2–8 October
- Edition: 12th
- Category: Tier I
- Draw: 28S / 16D
- Prize money: $806,250
- Surface: Carpet / indoor
- Location: Zürich, Switzerland
- Venue: Saalsporthalle Allmend

Champions

Singles
- (Croatia) Iva Majoli

Doubles
- (United States) Nicole Arendt (Netherlands) Manon Bollegraf
← 1994 ·	Zurich Open	· 1996 →

The 1995 European Indoors was a women's tennis tournament played on indoor carpet courts at the Saalsporthalle Allmend in Zürich in Switzerland and was part of the 1995 WTA Tour. It was the 12th edition of the tournament and was held from 2 October through 8 October 1995. Seventh-seeded Iva Majoli won the singles title and earned $150,000 first-prize money.

== Finals ==
=== Singles ===
(Croatia) Iva Majoli defeated (France) Mary Pierce 6–4, 6–4

- It was Majoli's 1st singles title of her career.

=== Doubles ===
(United States) Nicole Arendt / (Netherlands) Manon Bollegraf defeated (United States) Chanda Rubin / (Netherlands) Caroline Vis 6–4, 6–7^{(4–7)}, 6–4
