= 1996 European Indoors – Singles =

Singles
- 1996 European Indoors
- 1995 Champion: (Croatia) Iva Majoli

Final
- Champion: (Czech Republic) Jana Novotná
- Runner-up: (Switzerland) Martina Hingis
- Score: 6–2, 6–2

Details
- Draw: 28
- Seeds: 8

Events
Singles	Doubles
← 1995 ·	European Indoors	· 1997 →

Jana Novotná defeated Martina Hingis in the final, 6–2, 6–2 to win the singles tennis title at the 1996 European Indoor Championships.

Iva Majoli was the defending champion, but lost in the semifinals to Novotná.

== Seeds ==
A champion seed is indicated in bold text while text in italics indicates the round in which that seed was eliminated. The top four seeds received a bye to the second round.

1. (Spain) Conchita Martínez (second round)
2. (Croatia) Iva Majoli (semifinals)
3. (Germany) Anke Huber (semifinals)
4. (Czech Republic) **Jana Novotná (champion)**
5. (Switzerland) Martina Hingis (final)
6. (Netherlands) Brenda Schultz-McCarthy (quarterfinals)
7. (Bulgaria) Magdalena Maleeva (second round)
8. (South Africa) Amanda Coetzer (first round)

== Draw ==
=== Key ===
- Q = Qualifier
- WC = Wild card
- LL = Lucky loser
- Alt = Alternate
- SE = Special exempt
- PR = Protected ranking
- ITF = ITF entry
- JE = Junior exempt
- w/o = Walkover
- r = Retired
- d = Defaulted
- SR = Special ranking

=== Final ===
Final
5	(Switzerland) Martina Hingis	2	2
4	(Czech Republic) **Jana Novotná**	**6**	**6**

=== Section 1 ===
First round
(Belgium) **S Appelmans**	1	**7**	**6**
(United States) M Werdel-Witmeyer	**6**	5	3
Q	(Czech Republic) S Kleinová	3	6
(Romania) **I Spîrlea**	**6**	**7**
(Japan) N Sawamatsu	0	1
5	(Switzerland) **M Hingis**	**6**	**6**
(United States) **L Raymond**	**6**	**7**
(Belarus) N Zvereva	2	5
WC	(Switzerland) P Schnyder	**7**	4	6
Q	(Italy) **S Farina**	5	**6**	**7**
WC	(Russia) **A Kournikova**	2	**7**	**6**
8	(South Africa) A Coetzer	**6**	6	4

Second round
1	(Spain) C Martínez	4	4
(Belgium) **S Appelmans**	**6**	**6**
(Romania) I Spîrlea	3	3
5	(Switzerland) **M Hingis**	**6**	**6**
3	(Germany) **A Huber**	**6**	**6**
(United States) L Raymond	4	2
Q	(Italy) **S Farina**	0	**7**	**6**
WC	(Russia) A Kournikova	**6**	5	2

Quarterfinals
(Belgium) S Appelmans	3	1
5	(Switzerland) **M Hingis**	**6**	**6**
3	(Germany) **A Huber**	**6**	**6**
Q	(Italy) S Farina	1	1

Semifinals
5	(Switzerland) **M Hingis**	3	**6**	**7**
3	(Germany) A Huber	**6**	2	6

=== Section 2 ===
First round
7	(Bulgaria) **M Maleeva**	**6**	**7**
(Netherlands) M Oremans	3	5
(United States) **J Capriati**	**6**	**6**
(Argentina) G Sabatini	3	4
(Austria) **B Schett**	**6**	2	**6**
(Czech Republic) H Suková	4	**6**	2
6	(Netherlands) **B Schultz-McCarthy**	**6**	4	**6**
Q	(Germany) P Begerow	3	**6**	4
(Slovakia) **K Habšudová**	**6**	**6**
Q	(Germany) M Kochta	3	4
(Austria) **J Wiesner**	0	**6**	**6**
(France) N Tauziat	**6**	4	3

Second round
7	(Bulgaria) M Maleeva	3	3
(United States) **J Capriati**	**6**	**6**
(Austria) B Schett	**6**	4	5
4	(Czech Republic) **J Novotná**	4	**6**	**7**
6	(Netherlands) **B Schultz-McCarthy**	**7**	**7**
(Slovakia) K Habšudová	5	6
(Austria) J Wiesner	2	2
2	(Croatia) **I Majoli**	**6**	**6**

Quarterfinals
(United States) J Capriati	4	2
4	(Czech Republic) **J Novotná**	**6**	**6**
6	(Netherlands) B Schultz-McCarthy	3	6
2	(Croatia) **I Majoli**	**6**	**7**

Semifinals
4	(Czech Republic) **J Novotná**	5	**6**	**6**
2	(Croatia) I Majoli	**7**	2	2
