= 1993 Barilla Indoors – Doubles =

Doubles
- 1993 Barilla Indoors

Final
- Champions: (United States) Zina Garrison-Jackson; (United States) Martina Navratilova
- Runners-up: (United States) Gigi Fernández; (Belarus) Natasha Zvereva
- Score: 6–3, 5–7, 6–3

Details
- Draw: 16 (1 Q / 1 WC)
- Seeds: 4

Events
Singles	Doubles
- Zurich Open

Zina Garrison-Jackson and Martina Navratilova won the title, defeating Gigi Fernández and Natasha Zvereva in the final, 6–3, 5–7, 6–3.

Helena Suková and Natasha Zvereva were the defending champions, but only Zvereva chose to participate. Zvereva partnered Gigi Fernández, but lost in the final to the eventual champions Garrison-Jackson and Navratilova.

== Seeds ==
1. (United States) Gigi Fernández / (Belarus) Natalia Zvereva (final)
2. (Latvia) Larisa Savchenko-Neiland / (Czech Republic) Jana Novotná (semifinal)
3. (United States) Lori McNeil / (Australia) Rennae Stubbs (first round)
4. (United States) Pam Shriver / (Australia) Elizabeth Smylie (first round)

== Draw ==
Key

- Q = Qualifier
- WC = Wild card
- LL = Lucky loser
- Alt = Alternate
- ITF = ITF entry
- PR = Protected ranking
- SR = Special ranking
- SE = Special exempt
- JE = Junior exempt
- JR = Junior Accelerator Programme entrant
- CO = College Accelerator Programme entrant
- NG = Next Gen Accelerator Program entrant
- w/o = Walkover
- r = Retired
- d = Defaulted

First round

Quarterfinals

Semifinals

Final

1
(United States) G Fernández
(Belarus) N Zvereva
6
6

- (Soviet Union) E Maniokova
- (Slovakia) R Zrubáková
2
4

1
(United States) G Fernández
(Belarus) N Zvereva
6
6
6

- (United Kingdom) J Durie
- (South Africa) R Nideffer
6
6
6

- (United States) D Graham
- (Netherlands) B Schultz
7
3
4

(United States) D Graham
(Netherlands) B Schultz
3
7
7

1
(United States) G Fernández
(Belarus) N Zvereva
3
6
6

4
(United States) P Shriver
(Australia) E Smylie
6
6

- (United States) P Fendick
- (United States) M McGrath
6
4
2

- (United States) P Fendick
- (United States) M McGrath
2
3

(United States) P Fendick
(United States) M McGrath
6
6

(United States) K Adams
(Netherlands) M Bollegraf
6
7

- (United States) K Adams
- (Netherlands) M Bollegraf
4
3

- (Netherlands) M Oremans
- (Netherlands) C Vis
2
6

1
- (United States) Gigi Fernández
- (Belarus) Natalia Zvereva
3
7
3

(Switzerland) M Maleeva-Fragnière
(France) N Tauziat
6
6

(United States) Zina Garrison-Jackson
(United States) Martina Navratilova
6
5
6

Q
- (France) S Amiach
- (France) K Quentrec
0
3

- (Switzerland) M Maleeva-Fragnière
- (France) N Tauziat
4
3

(United States) Z Garrison-Jackson
(United States) M Navratilova
7
6

(United States) Z Garrison-Jackson
(United States) M Navratilova
6
6

3
- (United States) L McNeil
- (Australia) R Stubbs
5
4

(United States) Z Garrison-Jackson
(United States) M Navratilova
7
7

WC
(Netherlands) K Boogert
(Switzerland) E Zardo
6
1
6

2
- (Latvia) L Savchenko-Neiland
- (Czech Republic) J Novotná
5
6

- (Czech Republic) A Strnadová
- (Austria) J Wiesner
1
6
3

WC
- (Netherlands) K Boogert
- (Switzerland) E Zardo
2
2

- (Ukraine) N Medvedeva
- (Germany) B Rittner
3
4

2
(Latvia) L Savchenko-Neiland
(Czech Republic) J Novotná
6
6

2
(Latvia) L Savchenko-Neiland
(Czech Republic) J Novotná
6
6
