= 1994 European Indoors – Doubles =

Doubles
- 1994 European Indoors

Final
- Champions: (Netherlands) Manon Bollegraf (United States) Martina Navratilova
- Runners-up: (United States) Patty Fendick (United States) Meredith McGrath
- Score: 7–6^{(7–3)}, 6–1

Details
- Draw: 16 (1WC/1Q)
- Seeds: 4

Events
Singles	Doubles
← 1993 ·	Zurich Open	· 1995 →

Zina Garrison-Jackson and Martina Navratilova were the defending champions, but competed this year with different partners.

Garrison-Jackson teamed up with Larisa Neiland and lost in semifinals to Patty Fendick and Meredith McGrath.

Navratilova teamed up with Manon Bollegraf and successfully defended her title, by defeating Fendick and McGrath 7–6^{(7–3)}, 6–1 in the final.

== Seeds ==
1. (Czech Republic) Helena Suková / (Belarus) Natasha Zvereva (first round)
2. (United States) Patty Fendick / (United States) Meredith McGrath (final)
3. (Netherlands) Manon Bollegraf / (United States) Martina Navratilova (champions)
4. (United States) Zina Garrison-Jackson / (Latvia) Larisa Neiland (semifinals)

== Draw ==
=== Key ===
- Q = Qualifier
- WC = Wild card
- LL = Lucky loser
- Alt = Alternate
- SE = Special exempt
- PR = Protected ranking
- ITF = ITF entry
- JE = Junior exempt
- w/o = Walkover
- r = Retired
- d = Defaulted
- SR = Special ranking

=== Draw ===
First round
1	(Czech Republic) H Suková (Belarus) N Zvereva	4	6^{4}
(United Kingdom) V Lake (United Kingdom) C Wood	6	7^{7}
Q	(Argentina) F Labat (Croatia) I Majoli	3	4
(Russia) E Makarova (Russia) E Maniokova	6	6
3	(Netherlands) M Bollegraf (United States) M Navratilova	7	6
WC	(Bulgaria) M Maleeva (Ukraine) N Medvedeva	5	4
(Netherlands) K Boogert (United States) A Grossman	3	3
(United States) K Adams (United States) D Graham	6	6
(United States) L McNeil (Australia) R Stubbs	7^{9}	6
(United States) N Arendt (Australia) K Radford	6^{7}	1
(Netherlands) M Oremans (Netherlands) C Vis	6^{6}	7^{7}	4
4	(United States) Z Garrison-Jackson (Latvia) L Neiland	7^{8}	6^{1}	6
(France) M Pierce (Hungary) A Temesvári	7^{7}	6
(Canada) J Hetherington (United States) S Stafford	6^{3}	3
(United States) L Raymond (France) N Tauziat	d
2	(United States) P Fendick (United States) M McGrath

Quarterfinals
(United Kingdom) V Lake (United Kingdom) C Wood	3	5
(Russia) E Makarova (Russia) E Maniokova	6	7
3	(Netherlands) M Bollegraf (United States) M Navratilova	6	6^{10}	7
(United States) K Adams (United States) D Graham	2	7^{12}	5
(United States) L McNeil (Australia) R Stubbs	2	6	2
4	(United States) Z Garrison-Jackson (Latvia) L Neiland	6	4	6
(France) M Pierce (Hungary) A Temesvári	3	2
2	(United States) P Fendick (United States) M McGrath	6	6

Semifinals
(Russia) E Makarova (Russia) E Maniokova	7^{10}	0	2
3	(Netherlands) M Bollegraf (United States) M Navratilova	6^{8}	6	6
4	(United States) Z Garrison-Jackson (Latvia) L Neiland	4	4
2	(United States) P Fendick (United States) M McGrath	6	6

Final
3	(Netherlands) M Bollegraf (United States) M Navratilova	7^{7}	6
2	(United States) P Fendick (United States) M McGrath	6^{3}	1
