= 1996 European Indoors – Doubles =

Doubles
- 1996 European Indoors

Final
- Champions: (Switzerland) Martina Hingis (Czech Republic) Helena Suková
- Runners-up: (United States) Nicole Arendt (Belarus) Natasha Zvereva
- Score: 7–5, 6–4

Details
- Draw: 16
- Seeds: 4

Events
Singles	Doubles
← 1995 ·	European Indoors	· 1997 →

Nicole Arendt and Manon Bollegraf were the defending champions but only Arendt competed that year with Natasha Zvereva.

Arendt and Zvereva lost in the final 7–5, 6–4 against Martina Hingis and Helena Suková.

== Seeds ==
Champion seeds are indicated in bold text while text in italics indicates the round in which those seeds were eliminated.

1. (United States) Nicole Arendt / (Belarus) Natasha Zvereva (final)
2. (Switzerland) **Martina Hingis** / (Czech Republic) **Helena Suková (champions)**
3. (United States) Lori McNeil / (Argentina) Gabriela Sabatini (semifinals)
4. (Latvia) Larisa Savchenko / (France) Nathalie Tauziat (quarterfinals)

== Draw ==
=== Key ===
- Q = Qualifier
- WC = Wild card
- LL = Lucky loser
- Alt = Alternate
- SE = Special exempt
- PR = Protected ranking
- ITF = ITF entry
- JE = Junior exempt
- w/o = Walkover
- r = Retired
- d = Defaulted
- SR = Special ranking

First round
1	(United States) **N Arendt** (Belarus) **N Zvereva**	**6**	**6**
(Netherlands) K Boogert (Romania) I Spîrlea	2	3
(Italy) S Farina (United States) M Werdel-Witmeyer	6	2
(Belgium) **S Appelmans** (Netherlands) **M Oremans**	**7**	**6**
3	(United States) **L McNeil** (Argentina) **G Sabatini**	**7**	**7**
(Slovakia) K Habšudová (Russia) A Kournikova	5	5
(Czech Republic) S Kleinová (Germany) M Kochta	3	4
(Austria) **B Schett** (Switzerland) **P Schnyder**	**6**	**6**
(Germany) A Huber (Croatia) I Majoli	4	3
(Netherlands) **B Schultz-McCarthy** (Netherlands) **C Vis**	**6**	**6**
(Italy) F Perfetti (Italy) G Pizzichini	1	2
4	(Latvia) **L Savchenko** (France) **N Tauziat**	**6**	**6**
(Spain) **C Martínez** (Argentina) **P Tarabini**	4	**6**	**6**
(Germany) P Begerow (France) K Quentrec-Eagle	**6**	3	3
(Slovakia) H Nagyová (Poland) A Olsza	2	2
2	(Switzerland) **M Hingis** (Czech Republic) **H Suková**	**6**	**6**

Quarterfinals
1	(United States) **N Arendt** (Belarus) **N Zvereva**	**7**	**6**
(Belgium) S Appelmans (Netherlands) M Oremans	6	3
3	(United States) **L McNeil** (Argentina) **G Sabatini**	**6**	**7**
(Austria) B Schett (Switzerland) P Schnyder	1	5
(Netherlands) **B Schultz-McCarthy** (Netherlands) **C Vis**	6	**7**	**6**
4	(Latvia) L Savchenko (France) N Tauziat	**7**	6	3
(Spain) C Martínez (Argentina) P Tarabini	3	1
2	(Switzerland) **M Hingis** (Czech Republic) **H Suková**	**6**	**6**

Semifinals
1	(United States) **N Arendt** (Belarus) **N Zvereva**	**7**	**6**
3	(United States) L McNeil (Argentina) G Sabatini	5	2
(Netherlands) B Schultz-McCarthy (Netherlands) C Vis	**6**	3	0
2	(Switzerland) **M Hingis** (Czech Republic) **H Suková**	3	**6**	**6**

Final
1	(United States) Nicole Arendt (Belarus) Natasha Zvereva	5	4
2	(Switzerland) **Martina Hingis** (Czech Republic) **Helena Suková**	**7**	**6**
