= 1995 European Indoors – Doubles =

Doubles
- 1995 European Indoors

Final
- Champions: (United States) Nicole Arendt (Netherlands) Manon Bollegraf
- Runners-up: (United States) Chanda Rubin (Netherlands) Caroline Vis
- Score: 6–4, 6–7^{(4–7)}, 6–4

Details
- Draw: 16
- Seeds: 4

Events
Singles	Doubles
← 1994 ·	Zurich Open	· 1996 →

Manon Bollegraf and Martina Navratilova were the defending champions, but Navratilova did not compete this year, following her plans of retiring from professional tennis at the end of the season.

Bollegraf teamed up with Nicole Arendt and successfully defended her title, by defeating Chanda Rubin and Caroline Vis 6–4, 6–7^{(4–7)}, 6–4 in the final.

== Seeds ==
1. (United States) Mary Joe Fernández / (Czech Republic) Jana Novotná (quarterfinals)
2. (United States) Meredith McGrath / (Latvia) Larisa Neiland (first round)
3. (United States) Lisa Raymond / (Belarus) Natasha Zvereva (first round)
4. (Netherlands) Brenda Schultz-McCarthy / (Australia) Rennae Stubbs (first round)

== Draw ==
=== Key ===
- Q = Qualifier
- WC = Wild card
- LL = Lucky loser
- Alt = Alternate
- SE = Special exempt
- PR = Protected ranking
- ITF = ITF entry
- JE = Junior exempt
- w/o = Walkover
- r = Retired
- d = Defaulted
- SR = Special ranking

=== Draw ===
First round
1	(United States) MJ Fernández (Czech Republic) J Novotná	6	6
(Russia) E Makarova (Russia) E Maniokova	3	4
(Russia) C Rubin (Netherlands) C Vis	6	1	6
(Switzerland) M Hingis (Croatia) I Majoli	4	6	3
4	(Netherlands) B Schultz-McCarthy (Australia) R Stubbs	3	4
(United States) L McNeil (Czech Republic) H Suková	6	6
(United States) K Adams (United States) Z Garrison-Jackson	6	6
Q	(United States) A Frazier (United States) K Po	2	3
(Romania) I Spîrlea (Argentina) P Tarabini	3	2
(South Africa) M de Swardt (Belgium) N Feber	6	6
(Netherlands) K Boogert (Netherlands) N Muns-Jagerman	3	7^{7}	6
3	(United States) L Raymond (Belarus) N Zvereva	6	6^{5}	3
WC	(France) M Pierce (Hungary) A Temesvári	3	0
(United States) N Arendt (Netherlands) M Bollegraf	6	6
(France) J Halard (France) N Tauziat	6	3	6
2	(United States) M McGrath (Latvia) L Neiland	3	6	4

Quarterfinals
1	(United States) MJ Fernández (Czech Republic) J Novotná	6	4	3
(Russia) C Rubin (Netherlands) C Vis	3	6	6
(United States) L McNeil (Czech Republic) H Suková	7	6
(United States) K Adams (United States) Z Garrison-Jackson	5	3
(South Africa) M de Swardt (Belgium) N Feber	6	4	6
(Netherlands) K Boogert (Netherlands) N Muns-Jagerman	1	6	2
(United States) N Arendt (Netherlands) M Bollegraf	7^{7}	6
(France) J Halard (France) N Tauziat	6^{4}	0

Semifinals
(Russia) C Rubin (Netherlands) C Vis	6^{4}	6	6
(United States) L McNeil (Czech Republic) H Suková	7^{7}	2	4
(South Africa) M de Swardt (Belgium) N Feber	4	6	4
(United States) N Arendt (Netherlands) M Bollegraf	6	3	6

Final
(Russia) C Rubin (Netherlands) C Vis	4	7^{7}	4
(United States) N Arendt (Netherlands) M Bollegraf	6	6^{4}	6
