= 1997 European Indoors – Doubles =

Doubles
- 1997 European Indoors

Final
- Champions: (Switzerland) Martina Hingis (Spain) Arantxa Sánchez Vicario
- Runners-up: (Latvia) Larisa Savchenko (Czech Republic) Helena Suková
- Score: 4–6, 6–4, 6–1

Details
- Draw: 16
- Seeds: 4

Events
| Singles | Doubles |
| ← 1996 · | Zurich Open | · 1998 → |

Martina Hingis and Helena Suková were the defending champions but they competed with different partners that year, Hingis with Arantxa Sánchez Vicario and Suková with Larisa Savchenko.

Savchenko and Suková lost in the final 4–6, 6–4, 6–1 against Hingis and Sánchez Vicario.

== Seeds ==
Champion seeds are indicated in bold text while text in italics indicates the round in which those seeds were eliminated.

1. (United States) Lindsay Davenport / (Czech Republic) Jana Novotná (semifinals)
2. (Switzerland) **Martina Hingis** / (Spain) **Arantxa Sánchez Vicario (champions)**
3. (United States) Mary Joe Fernández / (United States) Lisa Raymond (first round)
4. (United States) Kimberly Po / (Belarus) Natasha Zvereva (quarterfinals)

== Draw ==
=== Key ===
- Q = Qualifier
- WC = Wild card
- LL = Lucky loser
- Alt = Alternate
- ITF = ITF entry
- PR = Protected ranking
- SR = Special ranking
- SE = Special exempt
- JE = Junior exempt
- JR = Junior Accelerator Programme entrant
- CO = College Accelerator Programme entrant
- NG = Next Gen Accelerator Program entrant
- w/o = Walkover
- r = Retired
- d = Defaulted

First round
1 | (United States) **L Davenport** (Czech Republic) **J Novotná** | **6** | **6**
(Romania) R Dragomir (Croatia) I Majoli | 2 | 2
(United States) **K Adams** (Netherlands) **M Bollegraf** | **7**
(Netherlands) B Schultz-McCarthy (Romania) I Spîrlea | 6 | r
4 | (United States) **K Po** (Belarus) **N Zvereva** | **7** | **6**
(France) A Fusai (France) N Tauziat | 5 | 3
WC | (Bulgaria) M Maleeva (Spain) M Serna | 3 | 4
(Latvia) **L Savchenko** (Czech Republic) **H Suková** | **6** | **6**
(Spain) **C Martínez** (Argentina) **P Tarabini** | **6** | **6**
Q | (United States) A Miller (United States) B Rippner | 4 | 4
(South Africa) **A Coetzer** (Germany) **A Huber** | **6** | **7**
3 | (United States) M J Fernández (United States) L Raymond | 2 | 5
(Japan) A Sugiyama (Belgium) D Van Roost | 3 | 2
(Indonesia) **Y Basuki** (Netherlands) **C Vis** | **6** | **6**
(Belgium) S Appelmans (Netherlands) M Oremans | 3 | 4
2 | (Switzerland) **M Hingis** (Spain) **A Sánchez Vicario** | **6** | **6**

Quarterfinals
1 | (United States) **L Davenport** (Czech Republic) **J Novotná** | **6** | **7**
(United States) K Adams (Netherlands) M Bollegraf | 3 | 5
4 | (United States) K Po (Belarus) N Zvereva
(Latvia) **L Savchenko** (Czech Republic) **H Suková** | **w/o**
(Spain) **C Martínez** (Argentina) **P Tarabini** | **w/o**
(South Africa) A Coetzer (Germany) A Huber
(Indonesia) Y Basuki (Netherlands) C Vis | 1 | 5
2 | (Switzerland) **M Hingis** (Spain) **A Sánchez Vicario** | **6** | **7**

Semifinals
1 | (United States) L Davenport (Czech Republic) J Novotná | 6 | 4
(Latvia) **L Savchenko** (Czech Republic) **H Suková** | **7** | **6**
(Spain) C Martínez (Argentina) P Tarabini | 2 | 1
2 | (Switzerland) **M Hingis** (Spain) **A Sánchez Vicario** | **6** | **6**

Final
(Latvia) Larisa Savchenko (Czech Republic) Helena Suková | **6** | 4 | 1
2 | (Switzerland) **Martina Hingis** (Spain) **Arantxa Sánchez Vicario** | 4 | **6** | **6**

== Qualifying ==
=== Seeds ===
Both seeds received a bye into the second round.

1. (Italy) Silvia Farina / (Austria) Barbara Schett (second round)
2. (Sweden) Åsa Carlsson / (Italy) Rita Grande (second round)

=== Qualifiers ===
1. **(United States) Annie Miller / (United States) Brie Rippner**

=== Qualifying draw ===
First round
(South Africa) J Kruger (Germany) C Schneider | 2
WC | **(United States) S Williams** **(United States) V Williams** | **8**

Second round
1 | (Italy) S Farina (Austria) B Schett | 5
**(United States) A Miller** **(United States) B Rippner** | **8**
WC | **(United States) S Williams** **(United States) V Williams** | **9**
2 | (Sweden) Å Carlsson (Italy) R Grande | 7

Qualifying competition
**(United States) A Miller** **(United States) B Rippner** | **9**
WC | (United States) S Williams (United States) V Williams | 8
