= Natasha Zvereva =

Belarusian tennis player

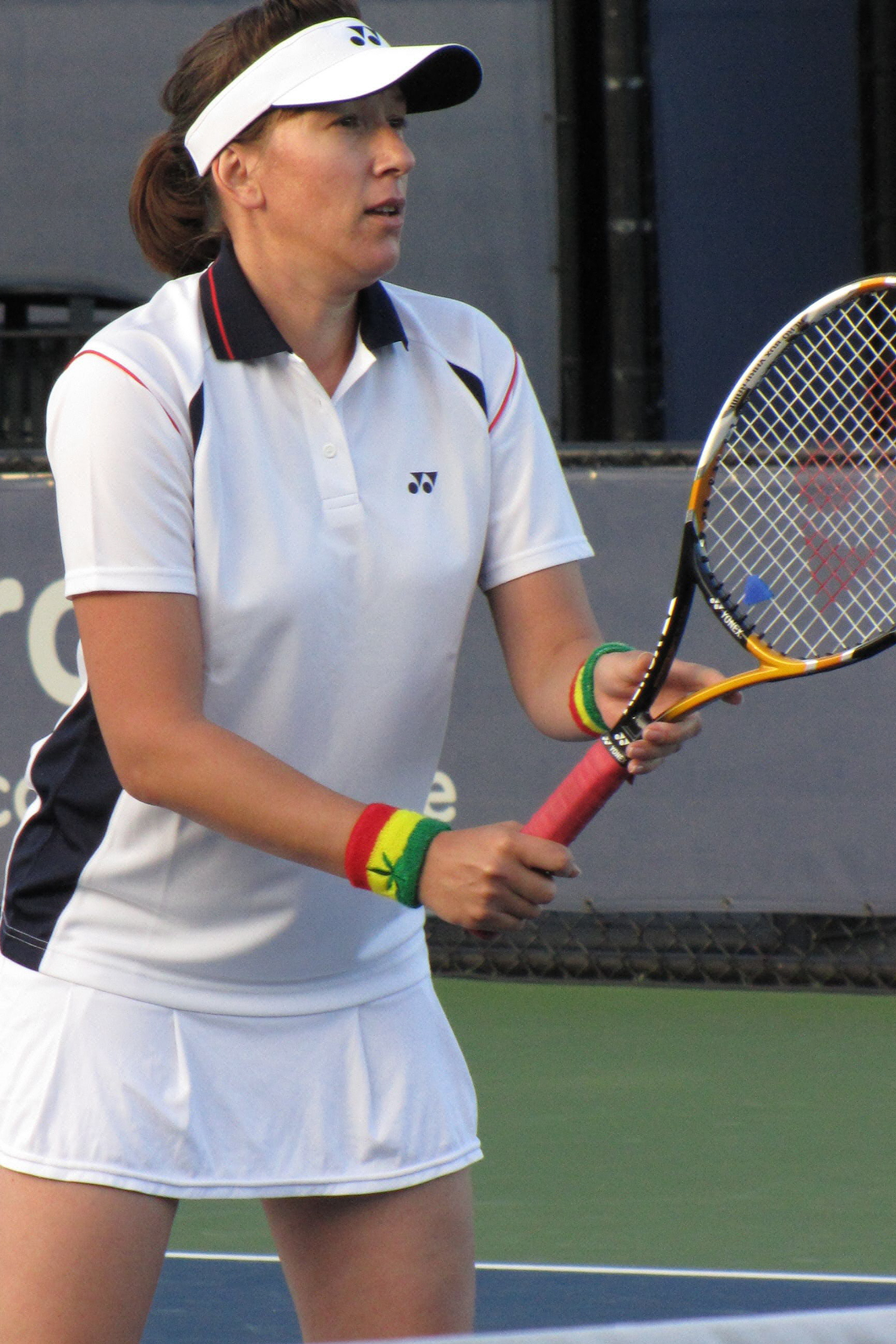
- Native name: Наташа Зверaва
- Country (sports): USSR (1988–1991), CIS (1992), Unified Team (1992), Belarus (from 1993)
- Residence: Minsk, Belarus
- Born: 16 April 1971 (age 55) Minsk, Byelorussian SSR, Soviet Union
- Height: 1.74 m (5 ft 9 in)
- Turned pro: May 1988
- Retired: 2002
- Plays: Right-handed (two-handed backhand)
- Prize money: $7,792,503
- Int. Tennis HoF: 2010 (member page)

Singles
- Career record: 434–252 (63.3%)
- Career titles: 4 WTA, 3 ITF
- Highest ranking: No. 5 (22 May 1989)

Grand Slam singles results
- Australian Open: QF (1995)
- French Open: F (1988)
- Wimbledon: SF (1998)
- US Open: QF (1993)

Doubles
- Career record: 714–170
- Career titles: 80 WTA, 3 ITF
- Highest ranking: No. 1 (7 October 1991)

Grand Slam doubles results
- Australian Open: W (1993, 1994, 1997)
- French Open: W (1989, 1992, 1993, 1994, 1995, 1997)
- Wimbledon: W (1991, 1992, 1993, 1994, 1997)
- US Open: W (1991, 1992, 1995, 1996)

Other doubles tournaments
- Tour Finals: W (1993, 1994, 1998)

Mixed doubles
- Career titles: 2

Grand Slam mixed doubles results
- Australian Open: W (1990, 1995)
- Wimbledon: F (1991)
- US Open: F (1990)

Team competitions
- Fed Cup: 59–21
Medal record
Women's tennis
Representing the Unified Team
Olympic Games
Bronze medal – third place	1992 Barcelona	Doubles

Natalya "Natasha" Maratovna Zvereva (Note: Russian: Наталья "Наташа" Маратовна Зверева; Belarusian: Наталля "Наташа" Маратаўна Зверава, romanized: Natallia "Nataša" Marataŭna Zvierava;) (born 16 April 1971) is a former professional tennis player from Belarus. She was the first major athlete in the Soviet Union to demand publicly that she should be able to keep her tournament earnings. Zvereva and her main doubles partner Gigi Fernández are the most successful women's doubles team (measured by WTA Tour and major titles) since Martina Navratilova and Pam Shriver.

On 12 July 2010, Zvereva was inducted into the International Tennis Hall of Fame alongside Fernández.

== Personal life ==
Zvereva was born as Natalya Maratovna Zvereva in Minsk, Belarus to parents Marat Nikolayevich Zverev and Nina Grigoryevna Zvereva. She started tennis at the age of seven at the encouragement of her parents, who were both tennis instructors in the Soviet Union. While her name is sometimes spelled Zverava, in 1994 she officially changed her name to Natasha Zvereva. At 18, answering the question about her personal symbol of success, she famously replied the following: "A red Mercedes-Benz, a big one".

== Career ==
As a junior, Zvereva won the Wimbledon girls' singles title in 1986, defeating Leila Meskhi in the final 2–6, 6–2, 9–7. In 1987, Zvereva won the Wimbledon girls' singles title again, as well as the US Open and French Open girls' singles titles, making her one of only 2 players to win 4 or more junior titles and one of only 2 players to win 3 or more junior singles titles in a calendar year.

After turning pro, Zvereva won four WTA Tour singles titles and 80 WTA Tour doubles titles, 18 of them in Grand Slam tournaments: five at Wimbledon, four at the US Open, five at the French Open, and four at the Australian Open. She won those Grand Slam doubles titles with four different partners: Gigi Fernández, Martina Hingis, Pam Shriver, and Larisa Savchenko Neiland. She achieved non-calendar year Grand Slams twice: in 1992–93 with Fernández and in 1996–97 with Fernández (three tournaments) and Hingis (Australia).

In addition to her Grand Slam doubles titles, Zvereva teamed with Meskhi to win a bronze medal at the 1992 Olympics in Barcelona.

At the age of 17, she made her sole Grand Slam singles final at the 1988 French Open, beating Martina Navratilova en route. In a highly publicized final, she lost to Steffi Graf 6-0, 6-0 in only 34 minutes. The official time of the match given on the scoresheet was 34 minutes, but just 32 minutes of that was spent on the court, as a rain break split the match into two periods of play, of nine and 23 minutes. (Graf went on to win all four Grand Slam singles titles and an Olympic gold medal that year.)

This was the shortest Grand Slam final in the Open Era. It was also the most one-sided until equalled by the 2025 women's final at Wimbledon, which had the same score but lasted 57 minutes.

Zvereva is one of the few players to have beaten both Graf and Monica Seles, both former world number ones, in the same Grand Slam singles tournament. Ten years later at Wimbledon in 1998, Zvereva defeated the fourth-seeded Graf in the third round 6–4, 7–5 and the sixth-seeded Seles in a quarterfinal 7–6, 6–2. This was also notable because it was Zvereva's sole win over Graf in 21 career singles matches. She lost in the semifinals to Nathalie Tauziat which was to be her second best career Grand Slam singles result. Starting with the French Open in 1987 and extending through Wimbledon in 2000, Zvereva played in 51 of the 54 Grand Slam singles tournaments held, reaching the quarterfinals or better eight times.

In addition to her Grand Slam women's doubles titles, Zvereva twice won the mixed-doubles title at the Australian Open. She partnered with Jim Pugh to win the title in 1990 and with Rick Leach in 1995.

Zvereva retired from professional tennis in 2003. Her last appearance in a Grand Slam tournament was in Wimbledon 2002, where she lost in the first round to Marlene Weingärtner 6–4, 3–6, 2–6.

== Playing style ==
Zvereva used a baseline, counter-punching style centered around topspin and her double-handed backhand. She had great hands, used a variety of spins, and was willing to rush the net and volley. Though Zvereva's talent was never in doubt, she often suffered from lapses in concentration during matches and in her confidence as a singles player.

== Significant finals ==
=== Grand Slam finals ===
==== Singles: 1 (runner-up) ====
Result	Year	Championship	Surface	Opponent	Score
Loss	1988	French Open	Clay	(Germany) Steffi Graf	0–6, 0–6

==== Doubles: 31 (18 titles, 13 runner-ups) ====
Result	Year	Championship	Surface	Partner	Opponents	Score
Loss	1988	Wimbledon (1)	Grass	(Soviet Union) Larisa Savchenko	(West Germany) Steffi Graf (Argentina) Gabriela Sabatini	3–6, 6–1, 10–12
Win	1989	French Open (1)	Clay	(Soviet Union) Larisa Savchenko	(West Germany) Steffi Graf (Argentina) Gabriela Sabatini	6–4, 6–4
Loss	1989	Wimbledon (2)	Grass	(Soviet Union) Larisa Savchenko	(Czechoslovakia) Jana Novotná (Czechoslovakia) Helena Suková	1–6, 2–6
Loss	1990	French Open (1)	Clay	(Soviet Union) Larisa Savchenko-Neiland	(Czechoslovakia) Jana Novotná (Czechoslovakia) Helena Suková	4–6, 5–7
Loss	1991	French Open (2)	Clay	(Soviet Union) Larisa Savchenko-Neiland	(United States) Gigi Fernández (Czechoslovakia) Jana Novotná	4–6, 0–6
Win	1991	Wimbledon (1)	Grass	(Latvia) Larisa Savchenko-Neiland	(Puerto Rico) Gigi Fernández (Czechoslovakia) Jana Novotná	6–4, 3–6, 6–4
Win	1991	US Open (1)	Hard	(United States) Pam Shriver	(Czechoslovakia) Jana Novotná (Latvia) Larisa Neiland	6–4, 4–6, 7–6^{(7–5)}
Win	1992	French Open (2)	Clay	(United States) Gigi Fernández	(Spain) Conchita Martínez (Spain) Arantxa Sánchez Vicario	6–3, 6–2
Win	1992	Wimbledon (2)	Grass	(United States) Gigi Fernández	(Czechoslovakia) Jana Novotná (Latvia) Larisa Neiland	6–4, 6–1
Win	1992	US Open (2)	Hard	(United States) Gigi Fernández	(Czechoslovakia) Jana Novotná (Latvia) Larisa Neiland	7–6^{(7–4)}, 6–1
Win	1993	Australian Open (1)	Hard	(United States) Gigi Fernández	(United States) Pam Shriver (Australia) Elizabeth Smylie	6–4, 6–3
Win	1993	French Open (3)	Clay	(United States) Gigi Fernández	(Czech Republic) Jana Novotná (Latvia) Larisa Neiland	6–3, 7–5
Win	1993	Wimbledon (3)	Grass	(United States) Gigi Fernández	(Czech Republic) Jana Novotná (Latvia) Larisa Neiland	6–4, 6–7^{(9–11)}, 6–4
Win	1994	Australian Open (2)	Hard	(United States) Gigi Fernández	(United States) Patty Fendick (Australia) Meredith McGrath	6–3, 4–6, 6–4
Win	1994	French Open (4)	Clay	(United States) Gigi Fernández	(United States) Lindsay Davenport (United States) Lisa Raymond	6–2, 6–2
Win	1994	Wimbledon (4)	Grass	(United States) Gigi Fernández	(Czech Republic) Jana Novotná (Spain) Arantxa Sánchez Vicario	6–4, 6–1
Loss	1995	Australian Open (1)	Hard	(United States) Gigi Fernández	(Czech Republic) Jana Novotná (Spain) Arantxa Sánchez Vicario	3–6, 7–6^{(7–3)}, 4–6
Win	1995	French Open (5)	Clay	(United States) Gigi Fernández	(Czech Republic) Jana Novotná (Spain) Arantxa Sánchez Vicario	6–7^{(6–8)}, 6–4, 7–5
Loss	1995	Wimbledon (3)	Grass	(United States) Gigi Fernández	(Czech Republic) Jana Novotná (Spain) Arantxa Sánchez Vicario	7–5, 5–7, 4–6
Win	1995	US Open (3)	Hard	(United States) Gigi Fernández	(Netherlands) Brenda Schultz (Australia) Rennae Stubbs	7–5, 6–3
Loss	1996	French Open (3)	Clay	(United States) Gigi Fernández	(United States) Lindsay Davenport (United States) Mary Joe Fernández	2–6, 1–6
Win	1996	US Open (4)	Hard	(United States) Gigi Fernández	(Czech Republic) Jana Novotná (Spain) Arantxa Sánchez Vicario	1–6, 6–1, 6–4
Win	1997	Australian Open (3)	Hard	(Switzerland) Martina Hingis	(United States) Lindsay Davenport (United States) Lisa Raymond	6–2, 6–2
Win	1997	French Open (6)	Clay	(United States) Gigi Fernández	(United States) Mary Joe Fernández (United States) Lisa Raymond	6–2, 6–3
Win	1997	Wimbledon (5)	Grass	(United States) Gigi Fernández	(United States) Nicole Arendt (Netherlands) Manon Bollegraf	7–6^{(7–4)}, 6–4
Loss	1997	US Open (1)	Hard	(United States) Gigi Fernández	(United States) Lindsay Davenport (Czech Republic) Jana Novotná	3–6, 4–6
Loss	1998	Australian Open (2)	Hard	(United States) Lindsay Davenport	(Switzerland) Martina Hingis (Croatia) Mirjana Lučić	4–6, 6–2, 3–6
Loss	1998	French Open (4)	Clay	(United States) Lindsay Davenport	(Switzerland) Martina Hingis (Czech Republic) Jana Novotná	1–6, 6–7^{(4–7)}
Loss	1998	Wimbledon (4)	Grass	(United States) Lindsay Davenport	(Switzerland) Martina Hingis (Czech Republic) Jana Novotná	3–6, 6–3, 6–8
Loss	1998	US Open (2)	Hard	(United States) Lindsay Davenport	(Switzerland) Martina Hingis (Czech Republic) Jana Novotná	3–6, 3–6
Loss	1999	Australian Open (3)	Hard	(United States) Lindsay Davenport	(Switzerland) Martina Hingis (Russia) Anna Kournikova	5–7, 3–6

==== Mixed doubles: 4 (2 titles, 2 runner-ups) ====
Result	Year	Championship	Surface	Partner	Opponents	Score
Win	1990	Australian Open (1)	Hard	(United States) Jim Pugh	(United States) Zina Garrison (United States) Rick Leach	4–6, 6–2, 6–3
Loss	1990	US Open (1)	Hard	(United States) Jim Pugh	(Australia) Elizabeth Smylie (Australia) Todd Woodbridge	4–6, 2–6
Loss	1991	Wimbledon (1)	Grass	(United States) Jim Pugh	(Australia) Elizabeth Smylie (Australia) John Fitzgerald	6–7^{(4–7)}, 2–6
Win	1995	Australian Open (2)	Hard	(United States) Rick Leach	(United States) Gigi Fernández (Czech Republic) Cyril Suk	7–6^{(7–4)}, 6–7^{(3–7)}, 6–4

=== Olympic Games ===
==== Doubles: 1 bronze medal ====
Result	Year	Championship	Surface	Partner	Opponents	Score
Bronze	1992	Barcelona	Clay	Leila Meskhi (EUN)	Tied	DNP

Meskhi and Zvereva lost in the semifinals to Gigi Fernández and Mary Joe Fernández 4–6, 5–7. In 1992, there was no bronze medal play-off match, both beaten semifinal pairs received bronze medals.

=== Year-end championships finals ===
==== Doubles: 6 (3 titles, 3 runner-ups) ====
Result	Year	Championship	Surface	Partner	Opponents	Score
Loss	1988	New York	Carpet (i)	(Soviet Union) Larisa Savchenko	(United States) Martina Navratilova (United States) Pam Shriver	3–6, 4–6
Loss	1989	New York	Carpet (i)	(Soviet Union) Larisa Savchenko	(United States) Martina Navratilova (United States) Pam Shriver	3–6, 2–6
Win	1993	New York	Carpet (i)	(United States) Gigi Fernández	(Latvia) Larisa Neiland (Czech Republic) Jana Novotná	6–3, 7–5
Win	1994	New York	Carpet (i)	(United States) Gigi Fernández	(Latvia) Larisa Neiland (Czech Republic) Jana Novotná	6–3, 6–7^{(4–7)}, 6–3
Loss	1995	New York	Carpet (i)	(United States) Gigi Fernández	(Czech Republic) Jana Novotná (Spain) Arantxa Sánchez Vicario	2–6, 1–6
Win	1998	New York	Carpet (i)	(United States) Lindsay Davenport	(France) Alexandra Fusai (France) Nathalie Tauziat	6–7^{(6–8)}, 7–5, 6–3

== WTA career finals ==
=== Singles: 19 (4–15) ===
Legend Grand Slam tournaments (0–1) Tier I (0–3) Tier II (2–5) Tier III (1–1) Tier IV (1–1) Tier V (0–1) Virginia Slims/VS (0–3)	Finals by surface Hard (2–6) Grass (1–2) Clay (0–3) Carpet (1–4)

Result	W-L	Date	Tournament	Surface	Opponent	Score
Loss	0–1	Nov 1986	VS of Arkansas, Little Rock	Carpet (i)	(United States) Kathy Rinaldi	4–6, 7–6^{(9–7)}, 0–6
Loss	0–2	Nov 1987	VS of Arkansas, Little Rock	Hard	(Italy) Sandra Cecchini	6–0, 1–6, 3–6
Loss	0–3	Nov 1987	Ameritech Cup, Chicago	Carpet (i)	(United States) Martina Navratilova	1–6, 2–6
Loss	0–4	May 1988	French Open, Paris	Clay	(West Germany) Steffi Graf	0–6, 0–6
Loss	0–5	Jun 1988	Eastbourne International, UK	Grass	(United States) Martina Navratilova	2–6, 2–6
Loss	0–6	Aug 1988	Canadian Open, Montreal	Hard	(Argentina) Gabriela Sabatini	1–6, 2–6
Loss	0–7	Oct 1988	VS of New England, Worcester	Carpet (i)	(United States) Martina Navratilova	7–6^{(7–4)}, 4–6, 3–6
Loss	0–8	Apr 1989	Family Circle Cup, Hilton Head	Clay	(West Germany) Steffi Graf	1–6, 1–6
Loss	0–9	Oct 1989	Moscow Ladies Open, Russia	Carpet (i)	(United States) Gretchen Magers	3–6, 4–6
Win	1–9	Jan 1990	Hardcourt Championships, Brisbane	Hard	(Australia) Rachel McQuillan	6–4, 6–0
Win	2–9	Jan 1990	Sydney International, Australia	Hard	(Austria) Barbara Paulus	4–6, 6–1, 6–3
Loss	2–10	Jun 1991	Birmingham Classic, UK	Grass	(United States) Martina Navratilova	4–6, 6–7^{(6–8)}
Loss	2–11	Oct 1993	Stuttgart Open, Filderstadt	Hard (i)	(France) Mary Pierce	3–6, 3–6
Win	3–11	Feb 1994	Ameritech Cup, Chicago	Carpet (i)	(United States) Chanda Rubin	6–3, 7–5
Loss	3–12	Mar 1994	Miami Masters, Key Biscayne	Hard	(Germany) Steffi Graf	6–4, 1–6, 2–6
Loss	3–13	Mar 1994	Family Circle Cup, Hilton Head	Clay	(Spain) Conchita Martínez	4–6, 0–6
Loss	3–14	Oct 1994	Zurich Open, Switzerland	Hard (i)	(Bulgaria) Magdalena Maleeva	5–7, 6–3, 4–6
Loss	3–15	Feb 1995	Indian Wells Masters, U.S.	Hard	(United States) Mary Joe Fernández	4–6, 3–6
Win	4–15	Jun 1999	Eastbourne International, UK	Grass	(France) Nathalie Tauziat	0–6, 7–5, 6–3

=== Doubles: 129 (80–49) ===
Legend Grand Slam tournaments (18–13) Tour Championships (3–3) Tier I (23–13) Tier II (26–12) Tier III (3–3) Tier IV (1–0) Tier V (4–1) Virginia Slims/VS (2–4)	Finals by surface Hard (27–16) Grass (12–7) Clay (21–15) Carpet (20–11)

Result	No.	Date	Tournament	Surface	Partner	Opponents	Score
Win	1.	Jun 1988	Birmingham Classic	Grass	(Soviet Union) Larisa Savchenko	(Soviet Union) Leila Meskhi (Soviet Union) Svetlana Parkhomenko	6–4, 6–1
Loss	1.	Jul 1988	Wimbledon	Grass	(Soviet Union) Larisa Savchenko	(West Germany) Steffi Graf (Argentina) Gabriela Sabatini	3–6, 6–1, 10–12
Win	2.	Oct 1988	VS of Indianapolis	Hard (i)	(Soviet Union) Larisa Savchenko	(United States) Katrina Adams (United States) Zina Garrison	6–2, 6–1
Loss	2.	Nov 1988	Ameritech Cup, Chicago	Carpet (i)	(Soviet Union) Larisa Savchenko	(United States) Lori McNeil (United States) Betsy Nagelsen	4–6, 6–3, 4–6
Loss	3.	Nov 1988	VS Championships, New York	Carpet (i)	(Soviet Union) Larisa Savchenko	(United States) Martina Navratilova (United States) Pam Shriver	3–6, 4–6
Loss	4.	Feb 1989	VS of Washington	Carpet (i)	(Soviet Union) Larisa Savchenko	(United States) Betsy Nagelsen (United States) Pam Shriver	2–6, 3–6
Loss	5.	Feb 1989	Stanford Classic, Oakland	Carpet (i)	(Soviet Union) Larisa Savchenko	(United States) Patty Fendick (Canada) Jill Hetherington	5–7, 6–3, 2–6
Win	3.	Apr 1989	Amelia Island Championships	Clay	(Soviet Union) Larisa Savchenko	(United States) Martina Navratilova (United States) Pam Shriver	7–6^{(7–4)}, 2–6, 6–1
Loss	6.	May 1989	Swiss Open, Geneva	Clay	(Soviet Union) Larisa Savchenko	(United States) Katrina Adams (United States) Lori McNeil	6–2, 3–6, 4–6
Win	4.	May 1989	French Open, Paris	Clay	(Soviet Union) Larisa Savchenko	(West Germany) Steffi Graf (Argentina) Gabriela Sabatini	6–4, 6–4
Win	5.	Jun 1989	Birmingham Classic	Grass	(Soviet Union) Larisa Savchenko	(United States) Meredith McGrath (United States) Pam Shriver	7–5, 5–7, 6–0
Loss	7.	Jun 1989	Wimbledon	Grass	(Soviet Union) Larisa Savchenko	(Czechoslovakia) Jana Novotná (Czechoslovakia) Helena Suková	1–6, 2–6
Win	6.	Oct 1989	Moscow Ladies Open	Carpet (i)	(Soviet Union) Larisa Savchenko	(France) Nathalie Herreman (France) Catherine Suire	6–3, 6–4
Win	7.	Nov 1989	Ameritech Cup, Chicago	Carpet (i)	(Soviet Union) Larisa Savchenko	(Czechoslovakia) Jana Novotná (Czechoslovakia) Helena Suková	6–3, 2–6, 6–3
Loss	8.	Nov 1989	VS Championships, New York	Carpet (i)	(Soviet Union) Larisa Savchenko	(United States) Martina Navratilova (United States) Pam Shriver	3–6, 2–6
Loss	9.	Jan 1990	Sydney International	Hard	(Soviet Union) Larisa Neiland	(Czechoslovakia) Jana Novotná (Czechoslovakia) Helena Suková	3–6, 5–7
Loss	10.	Apr 1990	Family Circle Cup, Hilton Head	Clay	(Argentina) Mercedes Paz	(United States) Martina Navratilova (Spain) Arantxa Sánchez Vicario	2–6, 2–6
Loss	11.	May 1990	French Open	Clay	(Soviet Union) Larisa Neiland	(Czechoslovakia) Jana Novotná (Czechoslovakia) Helena Suková	4–6, 5–7
Win	8.	Jun 1990	Birmingham Classic	Grass	(Soviet Union) Larisa Neiland	(South Africa) Lise Gregory (United States) Gretchen Magers	3–6, 6–3, 6–3
Win	9.	Jun 1990	Eastbourne International, UK	Grass	(Soviet Union) Larisa Neiland	(United States) Patty Fendick (United States) Zina Garrison	6–4, 6–3
Win	10.	Sep 1990	WTA Doubles Championships, Orlando	Carpet (i)	(Soviet Union) Larisa Neiland	(Netherlands) Manon Bollegraf (United States) Meredith McGrath	6–4, 6–1
Loss	12.	Oct 1990	Brighton International	Carpet (i)	(United Kingdom) Jo Durie	(Czechoslovakia) Helena Suková (France) Nathalie Tauziat	1–6, 4–6
Win	11.	Mar 1991	VS of Florida, Boca Raton	Hard	(Soviet Union) Larisa Neiland	(United States) Meredith McGrath (United States) Anne Smith	6–4, 7–6^{(7–3)}
Loss	13.	Mar 1991	WTA Doubles Championships, Tarpon Springs	Clay	(Soviet Union) Larisa Neiland	(United States) Gigi Fernández (Czechoslovakia) Helena Suková	6–4, 4–6, 6–7^{(3–7)}
Win	12.	Apr 1991	Family Circle Cup, Hilton Head	Clay	(Germany) Claudia Kohde-Kilsch	(United States) Mary Lou Daniels (South Africa) Lise Gregory	6–4, 6–0
Loss	14.	Apr 1991	Amelia Island Championships	Clay	(Argentina) Mercedes Paz	(Spain) Arantxa Sánchez Vicario (Czechoslovakia) Helena Suková	6–4, 2–6, 2–6
Win	13.	May 1991	German Open, Berlin	Clay	(Soviet Union) Larisa Neiland	(Australia) Nicole Provis (South Africa) Elna Reinach	6–3, 6–3
Loss	15.	May 1991	French Open, Paris	Clay	(Soviet Union) Larisa Neiland	(United States) Gigi Fernández (Czechoslovakia) Jana Novotná	4–6, 0–6
Win	14.	Jun 1991	Eastbourne International	Grass	(Soviet Union) Larisa Neiland	(United States) Gigi Fernández (Czechoslovakia) Jana Novotná	2–6, 6–4, 6–4
Win	15.	Jun 1991	Wimbledon, London	Grass	(Soviet Union) Larisa Neiland	(United States) Gigi Fernández (Czechoslovakia) Jana Novotná	6–4, 3–6, 6–4
Win	16.	Aug 1991	Canadian Open, Toronto	Hard	(Soviet Union) Larisa Neiland	(Germany) Claudia Kohde-Kilsch (Czechoslovakia) Helena Suková	1–6, 7–5, 6–2
Win	17.	Aug 1991	LA Championships, U.S.	Hard	(Soviet Union) Larisa Neiland	(United States) Gretchen Magers (United States) Robin White	6–1, 2–6, 6–2
Loss	16.	Aug 1991	VS of Washington	Hard	(United States) Gigi Fernández	(Soviet Union) Larisa Neiland (Czechoslovakia) Jana Novotná	7–5, 1–6, 6–7^{(10–12)}
Win	18.	Aug 1991	US Open, New York	Hard	(United States) Pam Shriver	(Soviet Union) Larisa Neiland (Czechoslovakia) Jana Novotná	6–4, 4–6, 7–6^{(7–5)}
Loss	17.	Oct 1991	Stuttgart Open, Germany	Hard (i)	(United States) Pam Shriver	(United States) Martina Navratilova (Czechoslovakia) Jana Novotná	2–6, 7–5, 4–6
Win	19.	Oct 1991	Brighton International	Carpet (i)	(United States) Pam Shriver	(United States) Zina Garrison (United States) Lori McNeil	6–1, 6–2
Win	20.	Mar 1992	VS of Florida, Boca Raton	Hard	(Latvia) Larisa Neiland	(Spain) Conchita Martínez (United States) Linda Wild	6–2, 6–2
Loss	18.	Mar 1992	WTA Doubles Championships, Wesley Chapel	Clay	(Spain) Arantxa Sánchez Vicario	(Latvia) Larisa Neiland (Czechoslovakia) Jana Novotná	4–6, 2–6
Win	21.	Mar 1992	Family Circle Cup, Hilton Head	Clay	(Spain) Arantxa Sánchez Vicario	(Latvia) Larisa Neiland (Czechoslovakia) Jana Novotná	6–4, 6–2
Win	22.	Apr 1992	Amelia Island Championships	Clay	(Spain) Arantxa Sánchez Vicario	(United States) Zina Garrison (Czechoslovakia) Jana Novotná	6–1, 6–0
Loss	19.	May 1992	German Open, Berlin	Clay	(United States) Gigi Fernández	(Latvia) Larisa Neiland (Czechoslovakia) Jana Novotná	6–7^{(5–7)}, 6–4, 5–7
Win	23.	May 1992	French Open	Clay	(United States) Gigi Fernández	(Spain) Conchita Martínez (Spain) Arantxa Sánchez Vicario	6–3, 6–2
Win	24.	Jun 1992	Wimbledon	Grass	(United States) Gigi Fernández	(Latvia) Larisa Neiland (Czechoslovakia) Jana Novotná	6–4, 6–1
Loss	20.	Aug 1992	Canadian Open, Montreal	Hard	(United States) Gigi Fernández	(United States) Lori McNeil (Australia) Rennae Stubbs	6–3, 5–7, 5–7
Win	25.	Aug 1992	US Open	Hard	(United States) Gigi Fernández	(Latvia) Larisa Neiland (Czechoslovakia) Jana Novotná	7–6^{(7–4)}, 6–1
Win	26.	Oct 1992	Zurich Open	Hard (i)	(Czechoslovakia) Helena Suková	(United States) Martina Navratilova (United States) Pam Shriver	7–6^{(7–5)}, 6–4
Loss	21.	Oct 1992	Stuttgart Open, Filderstadt	Hard (i)	(United States) Pam Shriver	(Spain) Arantxa Sánchez Vicario (Czechoslovakia) Helena Suková	4–6, 5–7
Win	27.	Nov 1992	Stanford Classic, Oakland	Carpet (i)	(United States) Gigi Fernández	(South Africa) Rosalyn Fairbank-Nideffer (United States) Gretchen Magers	3–6, 6–2, 6–4
Win	28.	Nov 1992	Championships of Philadelphia	Carpet (i)	(United States) Gigi Fernández	(Spain) Conchita Martínez (France) Mary Pierce	6–1, 6–3
Win	29.	Jan 1993	Australian Open, Melbourne	Hard	(United States) Gigi Fernández	(United States) Pam Shriver (Australia) Elizabeth Smylie	6–4, 6–3
Win	30.	Mar 1993	Virginia Slims of Florida, Delray Beach	Hard	(United States) Gigi Fernández	(Latvia) Larisa Neiland (Czech Republic) Jana Novotná	6–2, 6–2
Win	31.	Mar 1993	WTA Doubles Championships, Wesley Chapel	Clay	(United States) Gigi Fernández	(Latvia) Larisa Neiland (Spain) Arantxa Sánchez Vicario	7–5, 6–3
Win	32.	Mar 1993	Family Circle Cup, Hilton Head	Clay	(United States) Gigi Fernández	(United States) Katrina Adams (Netherlands) Manon Bollegraf	6–3, 6–1
Win	33.	May 1993	German Open, Berlin	Clay	(United States) Gigi Fernández	(United States) Debbie Graham (Netherlands) Brenda Schultz	6–1, 6–3
Win	34.	May 1993	French Open, Paris	Clay	(United States) Gigi Fernández	(Latvia) Larisa Neiland (Czech Republic) Jana Novotná	6–3, 7–5
Win	35.	Jun 1993	Eastbourne International	Grass	(United States) Gigi Fernández	(Latvia) Larisa Neiland (Czech Republic) Jana Novotná	2–6, 7–5, 6–1
Win	36.	Jun 1993	Wimbledon	Grass	(United States) Gigi Fernández	(Latvia) Larisa Neiland (Czech Republic) Jana Novotná	6–4, 6–7^{(9–11)}, 6–4
Loss	22.	Aug 1993	LA Women's Tennis Championships, Los Angeles	Hard	(United States) Gigi Fernández	(Spain) Arantxa Sánchez Vicario (Czech Republic) Helena Suková	6–7^{(3–7)}, 3–6
Win	37.	Sep 1993	Sparkassen Cup, Leipzig	Carpet (i)	(United States) Gigi Fernández	(Latvia) Larisa Neiland (Czech Republic) Jana Novotná	6–3, 6–2
Loss	23.	Oct 1993	Zurich Open	Hard (i)	(United States) Gigi Fernández	(United States) Zina Garrison (United States) Martina Navratilova	3–6, 7–5, 3–6
Win	38.	Oct 1993	Stuttgart Open, Filderstadt	Hard (i)	(United States) Gigi Fernández	(United States) Patty Fendick (United States) Martina Navratilova	7–6^{(8–6)}, 6–4
Win	39.	Nov 1993	VS Championships, New York	Carpet (i)	(United States) Gigi Fernández	(Latvia) Larisa Neiland (Czech Republic) Jana Novotná	6–3, 7–5
Win	40.	Jan 1994	Australian Open, Melbourne	Hard	(United States) Gigi Fernández	(United States) Patty Fendick (United States) Meredith McGrath	6–3, 4–6, 6–4
Win	41.	Feb 1994	Ameritech Cup, Chicago	Carpet (i)	(United States) Gigi Fernández	(Netherlands) Manon Bollegraf (United States) Martina Navratilova	6–3, 4–6, 6–4
Win	42.	Mar 1994	Miami Masters, Key Biscayne	Hard	(United States) Gigi Fernández	(United States) Patty Fendick (United States) Meredith McGrath	6–3, 6–1
Loss	24.	Mar 1994	WTA Doubles Championships, Wesley Chapel	Clay	(United States) Gigi Fernández	(Czech Republic) Jana Novotná (Spain) Arantxa Sánchez Vicario	2–6, 5–7
Loss	25.	Mar 1994	Family Circle Cup, Hilton Head	Clay	(United States) Gigi Fernández	(United States) Lori McNeil (Spain) Arantxa Sánchez Vicario	4–6, 1–4 ret.
Win	43.	May 1994	Italian Open, Rome	Clay	(United States) Gigi Fernández	(Argentina) Gabriela Sabatini (Netherlands) Brenda Schultz	6–1, 6–3
Win	44.	May 1994	German Open, Berlin	Clay	(United States) Gigi Fernández	(Czech Republic) Jana Novotná (Spain) Arantxa Sánchez Vicario	6–3, 7–6^{(7–2)}
Win	45.	May 1994	French Open, Paris	Clay	(United States) Gigi Fernández	(United States) Lindsay Davenport (United States) Lisa Raymond	6–2, 6–2
Win	46.	Jun 1994	Eastbourne International	Grass	(United States) Gigi Fernández	(Argentina) Inés Gorrochategui (Czech Republic) Helena Suková	6–7^{(4–7)}, 6–4, 6–3
Win	47.	Jun 1994	Wimbledon	Grass	(United States) Gigi Fernández	(Czech Republic) Jana Novotná (Spain) Arantxa Sánchez Vicario	6–4, 6–1
Win	48.	Oct 1994	Stuttgart Open, Filderstadt	Hard (i)	(United States) Gigi Fernández	(Netherlands) Manon Bollegraf (Latvia) Larisa Neiland	7–6^{(7–5)}, 6–4
Win	49.	Nov 1994	Championships of Philadelphia	Carpet (i)	(United States) Gigi Fernández	(Argentina) Gabriela Sabatini (Netherlands) Brenda Schultz	4–6, 6–4, 6–2
Win	50.	Nov 1994	VS Championships	Carpet (i)	(United States) Gigi Fernández	(Latvia) Larisa Neiland (Czech Republic) Jana Novotná	6–3, 6–7^{(4–7)}, 6–3
Loss	26.	Jan 1995	Australian Open	Hard	(United States) Gigi Fernández	(Czech Republic) Jana Novotná (Spain) Arantxa Sánchez Vicario	3–6, 7–6^{(7–3)}, 4–6
Win	51.	Feb 1995	Pan Pacific Open, Tokyo	Carpet (i)	(United States) Gigi Fernández	(United States) Lindsay Davenport (Australia) Rennae Stubbs	6–0, 6–3
Loss	27.	Mar 1995	Miami Masters, Key Biscayne	Hard	(United States) Gigi Fernández	(Czech Republic) Jana Novotná (Spain) Arantxa Sánchez Vicario	5–7, 6–2, 3–6
Loss	28.	Apr 1995	Family Circle Cup, Hilton Head	Clay	(United States) Gigi Fernández	(United States) Nicole Arendt (Netherlands) Manon Bollegraf	6–0, 3–6, 4–6
Win	52.	May 1995	Italian Open, Rome	Clay	(United States) Gigi Fernández	(Spain) Conchita Martínez (Argentina) Patricia Tarabini	3–6, 7–6^{(7–3)}, 6–4
Win	53.	Jun 1995	French Open	Clay	(United States) Gigi Fernández	(Czech Republic) Jana Novotná (Spain) Arantxa Sánchez Vicario	6–7^{(6–8)}, 6–4, 7–5
Loss	29.	Jun 1995	Eastbourne International	Grass	(United States) Gigi Fernández	(Czech Republic) Jana Novotná (Spain) Arantxa Sánchez Vicario	6–0, 3–6, 4–6
Loss	30.	Jul 1995	Wimbledon	Grass	(United States) Gigi Fernández	(Czech Republic) Jana Novotná (Spain) Arantxa Sánchez Vicario	7–5, 5–7, 4–6
Win	54.	Aug 1995	Southern California Open, San Diego	Hard	(United States) Gigi Fernández	(France) Alexia Dechaume-Balleret (France) Sandrine Testud	6–2, 6–1
Win	55.	Aug 1995	LA Championships	Hard	(United States) Gigi Fernández	(Latvia) Larisa Neiland (Argentina) Gabriela Sabatini	7–5, 6–7^{(2–7)}, 7–5
Win	56.	Sep 1995	US Open	Hard	(United States) Gigi Fernández	(Netherlands) Brenda Schultz-McCarthy (Australia) Rennae Stubbs	6–4, 7–6^{(8–6)}
Win	57.	Oct 1995	Stuttgart Open, Filderstadt	Hard (i)	(United States) Gigi Fernández	(United States) Meredith McGrath (Latvia) Larisa Neiland	5–7, 6–1, 6–4
Loss	31.	Nov 1995	WTA Tour Championships, New York	Carpet (i)	(United States) Gigi Fernández	(Czech Republic) Jana Novotná (Spain) Arantxa Sánchez Vicario	2–6, 1–6
Win	58.	Feb 1996	Pan Pacific Open, Tokyo	Carpet (i)	(United States) Gigi Fernández	(South Africa) Mariaan de Swardt (Romania) Irina Spîrlea	7–6^{(9–7)}, 6–3
Loss	32.	May 1996	WTA Doubles Championships, Edinburgh	Clay	(United States) Gigi Fernández	(United States) Nicole Arendt (Netherlands) Manon Bollegraf	3–6, 6–2, 6–7^{(6–8)}
Loss	33.	Jun 1996	French Open	Clay	(United States) Gigi Fernández	(United States) Lindsay Davenport (United States) Mary Joe Fernández	2–6, 1–6
Win	59.	Aug 1996	LA Championships	Hard	(United States) Lindsay Davenport	(United States) Amy Frazier (United States) Kimberly Po	6–1, 6–4
Win	60.	Sep 1996	US Open	Hard	(United States) Gigi Fernández	(Czech Republic) Jana Novotná (Spain) Arantxa Sánchez Vicario	1–6, 6–1, 6–4
Loss	34.	Oct 1996	Zurich Open	Hard (i)	(United States) Nicole Arendt	(Switzerland) Martina Hingis (Czech Republic) Helena Suková	5–7, 4–6
Loss	35.	Jan 1997	Sydney International	Hard	(United States) Lindsay Davenport	(United States) Gigi Fernández (Spain) Arantxa Sánchez Vicario	0–6, 6–7^{(5–7)}
Win	61.	Feb 1997	Australian Open	Hard	(Switzerland) Martina Hingis	(United States) Lisa Raymond (Australia) Rennae Stubbs	6–2, 6–2
Win	62.	Jan 1997	Pan Pacific Open, Tokyo	Carpet (i)	(United States) Lindsay Davenport	(United States) Gigi Fernández (Switzerland) Martina Hingis	6–4, 6–3
Win	63.	Mar 1997	Indian Wells Masters	Hard	(United States) Lindsay Davenport	(United States) Lisa Raymond (France) Nathalie Tauziat	7–5, 6–2
Win	64.	Mar 1997	Miami Masters, Key Biscayne	Hard	(Spain) Arantxa Sánchez Vicario	(Belgium) Sabine Appelmans (Netherlands) Miriam Oremans	6–4, 6–2
Loss	36.	May 1997	German Open, Berlin	Clay	(United States) Gigi Fernández	(United States) Lindsay Davenport (Czech Republic) Jana Novotná	2–6, 6–3, 2–6
Win	65.	May 1997	Internationaux de Strasbourg	Clay	(Czech Republic) Helena Suková	(Russia) Elena Likhovtseva (Japan) Ai Sugiyama	6–1, 6–1
Win	66.	Jun 1997	French Open	Clay	(United States) Gigi Fernández	(United States) Mary Joe Fernández (United States) Lisa Raymond	6–2, 6–3
Win	67.	Jul 1997	Wimbledon	Grass	(United States) Gigi Fernández	(United States) Nicole Arendt (Netherlands) Manon Bollegraf	6–2, 3–6, 6–1
Loss	37.	Sep 1997	US Open	Hard	(United States) Gigi Fernández	(United States) Lindsay Davenport (Czech Republic) Jana Novotná	3–6, 4–6
Win	68.	Nov 1997	Kremlin Cup, Moscow	Carpet (i)	(Spain) Arantxa Sánchez Vicario	(Indonesia) Yayuk Basuki (Netherlands) Caroline Vis	5–3 ret.
Loss	38.	Jan 1998	Australian Open	Hard	(United States) Lindsay Davenport	(Switzerland) Martina Hingis (Croatia) Mirjana Lučić	4–6, 6–2, 3–6
Loss	39.	Feb 1998	Pan Pacific Open, Tokyo	Carpet (i)	(United States) Lindsay Davenport	(Switzerland) Martina Hingis (Croatia) Mirjana Lučić	5–7, 4–6
Win	69.	Mar 1998	Indian Wells Masters	Hard	(United States) Lindsay Davenport	(France) Alexandra Fusai (France) Nathalie Tauziat	6–4, 2–6, 6–4
Loss	40.	Mar 1998	Miami Masters, Key Biscayne	Hard	(Spain) Arantxa Sánchez Vicario	(Switzerland) Martina Hingis (Czech Republic) Jana Novotná	2–6, 6–3, 3–6
Win	70.	May 1998	German Open, Berlin	Clay	(United States) Lindsay Davenport	(France) Alexandra Fusai (France) Nathalie Tauziat	6–3, 6–0
Loss	41.	Jun 1998	French Open	Clay	(United States) Lindsay Davenport	(Switzerland) Martina Hingis (Czech Republic) Jana Novotná	1–6, 6–7^{(4–7)}
Loss	42.	Jun 1998	Eastbourne International	Grass	(Spain) Arantxa Sánchez Vicario	(South Africa) Mariaan de Swardt (Czech Republic) Jana Novotná	1–6, 3–6
Loss	43.	Jul 1998	Wimbledon	Grass	(United States) Lindsay Davenport	(Switzerland) Martina Hingis (Czech Republic) Jana Novotná	3–6, 6–3, 6–8
Win	71.	Aug 1998	Stanford Classic	Hard	(United States) Lindsay Davenport	(Latvia) Larisa Neiland (Ukraine) Elena Tatarkova	6–4, 6–4
Win	72.	Aug 1998	Southern California Open, San Diego	Hard	(United States) Lindsay Davenport	(France) Alexandra Fusai (France) Nathalie Tauziat	6–2, 6–1
Win	73.	Aug 1998	LA Championships	Hard	(Switzerland) Martina Hingis	(Thailand) Tamarine Tanasugarn (Ukraine) Elena Tatarkova	6–4, 6–2
Loss	44.	Sep 1998	US Open	Hard	(United States) Lindsay Davenport	(Switzerland) Martina Hingis (Czech Republic) Jana Novotná	3–6, 3–6
Win	74.	Oct 1998	Stuttgart Open, Filderstadt	Hard (i)	(United States) Lindsay Davenport	(Russia) Anna Kournikova (Spain) Arantxa Sánchez Vicario	6–4, 6–2
Win	75.	Oct 1998	Kremlin Cup, Moscow	Carpet (i)	(France) Mary Pierce	(United States) Lisa Raymond (Australia) Rennae Stubbs	6–2, 6–4
Loss	45.	Nov 1998	Championships of Philadelphia	Carpet (i)	(United States) Monica Seles	(Russia) Elena Likhovtseva (Japan) Ai Sugiyama	5–7, 6–4, 2–6
Win	76.	Nov 1998	WTA Tour Championships	Carpet (i)	(United States) Lindsay Davenport	(France) Alexandra Fusai (France) Nathalie Tauziat	6–7^{(6–8)}, 7–5, 6–3
Loss	46.	Jan 1999	Australian Open	Hard	(United States) Lindsay Davenport	(Switzerland) Martina Hingis (Russia) Anna Kournikova	5–7, 3–6
Win	77.	Feb 1999	Pan Pacific Open, Tokyo	Carpet (i)	(United States) Lindsay Davenport	(Switzerland) Martina Hingis (Czech Republic) Jana Novotná	6–2, 6–3
Loss	47.	Jun 1999	Eastbourne International	Grass	(Czech Republic) Jana Novotná	(Switzerland) Martina Hingis (Russia) Anna Kournikova	4–6, ret.
Loss	48.	Oct 1999	Zurich Open	Hard (i)	(France) Nathalie Tauziat	(United States) Lisa Raymond (Australia) Rennae Stubbs	2–6, 2–6
Win	78.	Feb 2000	Faber Grand Prix, Hanover	Carpet (i)	(Sweden) Åsa Carlsson	(Italy) Silvia Farina (Slovakia) Karina Habšudová	6–3, 6–4
Loss	49.	Mar 2000	Indian Wells Masters	Hard	(Russia) Anna Kournikova	(United States) Lindsay Davenport (United States) Corina Morariu	2–6, 3–6
Win	79.	May 2000	WTA Hamburg, Germany	Clay	(Russia) Anna Kournikova	(United States) Nicole Arendt (Netherlands) Manon Bollegraf	6–7^{(5–7)}, 6–2, 6–4
Win	80.	May 2002	Madrid Open, Spain	Clay	(United States) Martina Navratilova	(Paraguay) Rossana de los Ríos (Spain) Arantxa Sánchez Vicario	6–2, 6–3

== ITF finals ==
=== Singles: 4 (3–1) ===
$100,000 tournaments
$75,000 tournaments
$50,000 tournaments
$25,000 tournaments
$10,000 tournaments

Result	No.	Date	Tournament	Surface	Opponent	Score
Loss	1.	4 May 1986	ITF Sutton, United Kingdom	Clay	(Sweden) Cecilia Dahlman	6–2, 3–6, 6–0
Win	2.	11 May 1986	ITF Bournemouth, United Kingdom	Clay	(Japan) Kumiko Okamoto	6–2, 4–6, 7–5
Win	3.	10 October 1986	ITF Bethesda, United States	Hard	(United States) Stacey Martin	6–3, 6–3
Win	4.	3 May 1987	ITF Taranto, Italy	Clay	(Czechoslovakia) Regina Kordová	7–6, 4–6, 6–3

=== Doubles: 4 (3–1) ===
Result	No.	Date	Tournament	Surface	Partner	Opponents	Score
Loss	1.	6 January 1986	ITF El Paso, United States	Clay	(Soviet Union) Viktoria Milvidskaia	(United States) Cammy MacGregor (United States) Cynthia MacGregor	6–4, 3–6, 4–6
Win	2.	21 April 1986	ITF Bournemouth, United Kingdom	Hard	(Soviet Union) Natalia Egorova	(Czechoslovakia) Regina Kordová (Czechoslovakia) Petra Tesarová	6–1, 6–2
Win	3.	10 October 1986	ITF Bethesda, United States	Hard	(Soviet Union) Leila Meskhi	(United States) Jane Forman (United States) Jenni Goodling	6–3, 6–1
Win	4.	3 May 1987	ITF Taranto, Italy	Clay	(Soviet Union) Leila Meskhi	(Netherlands) Simone Schilder (United Kingdom) Clare Wood	6–3, 6–2

== Other finals ==
=== Singles (3–0) ===
Result	No.	Year	Tournament	Location	Opponent	Score
Win	1.	1986	USSR Tennis National Championship	Alma-Ata, Kazakh SSR	(Soviet Union) Leila Meskhi	6–2, 6–4
Win	2.	1987	USSR Tennis National Championship	Tallinn, Soviet Union	(Soviet Union) Viktoria Milvidskaia	6–1, 6–2
Win	3.	1988	USSR Winter Tennis National Championship	Moscow, Russian SFSR	(Soviet Union) Leila Meskhi	6–2, 6–2

=== Doubles (2–1) ===
Result	No.	Year	Tournament	Location	Partner	Opponents	Score
Loss	1.	1986	USSR Tennis National Championship	Alma-Ata, Kazakh SSR	(Soviet Union) Leila Meskhi	(Soviet Union) Svetlana Parkhomenko (Soviet Union) Larisa Savchenko	2–6, 4–6
Win	2.	1988	USSR Winter Tennis National Championship	Moscow, Russian SFSR	(Soviet Union) Larisa Savchenko	(Soviet Union) Natalia Egorova (Soviet Union) Svetlana Parkhomenko	7–6, 0–6, 6–4
Win	3.	1989	USSR Winter Tennis National Championship	Moscow, Russian SFSR	(Soviet Union) Larisa Savchenko	(Soviet Union) Eugenia Maniokova (Soviet Union) Elena Pogorelova	6–7, 1–0 ret.

=== Mixed (1–0) ===
Result	No.	Year	Tournament	Location	Partner	Opponents	Score
Win	1.	1987	USSR Tennis National Championship	Tallinn, Soviet Union	(Soviet Union) Andres Võsand	(Soviet Union) Natalia Egorova (Soviet Union) Andrei Olhovskiy	6–2, 3–6, 6–3

== Grand Slam performance timelines ==
Key
W	F	SF	QF	#R	RR	Q#	DNQ	A	NH

(W) winner; (F) finalist; (SF) semifinalist; (QF) quarterfinalist; (#R) rounds 4, 3, 2, 1; (RR) round-robin stage; (Q#) qualification round; (DNQ) did not qualify; (A) absent; (NH) not held; (SR) strike rate (events won / competed); (W–L) win–loss record.

=== Singles ===
	Soviet Union						CIS	Belarus										
Tournament	1986	1987	1988	1989	1990	1991	1992	1993	1994	1995	1996	1997	1998	1999	2000	2001	2002	Career SR
Australian Open	NH	A	A	A	2R	4R	2R	3R	1R	QF	1R	3R	3R	3R	2R	A	A	0 / 11
French Open	A	3R	F	1R	4R	2R	QF	4R	4R	1R	3R	4R	2R	2R	4R	A	A	0 / 14
Wimbledon	Q1	4R	4R	3R	QF	2R	QF	QF	1R	3R	2R	1R	SF	2R	2R	A	1R	0 / 15
US Open	A	3R	1R	4R	2R	4R	3R	QF	A	4R	3R	3R	2R	2R	A	A	A	0 / 12
SR	0 / 0	0 / 3	0 / 3	0 / 3	0 / 4	0 / 4	0 / 4	0 / 4	0 / 3	0 / 4	0 / 4	0 / 4	0 / 4	0 / 4	0 / 3	0 / 0	0 / 1	0 / 52
Year-end ranking	94	19	7	27	12	21	23	19	10	14	57	25	16	27	79	NR	NR	

=== Doubles ===
	Soviet Union						CIS	Belarus											
Tournament	1986	1987	1988	1989	1990	1991	1992	1993	1994	1995	1996	1997	1998	1999	2000	2001	2002	SR	W–L
Australian Open	NH	A	A	A	QF	QF	SF	W	W	F	QF	W	F	F	2R	A	A	3 / 11	47–8
French Open	A	A	3R	W	F	F	W	W	W	W	F	W	F	QF	3R	A	1R	6 / 14	63–8
Wimbledon	A	1R	F	F	SF	W	W	W	W	F	SF	W	F	SF	SF	A	2R	5 / 15	66–10
US Open	A	1R	2R	QF	SF	W	W	SF	SF	W	W	F	F	3R	A	A	3R	4 / 13	54–10
Win–loss	0–0	0–2	8–3	14–2	16–4	20–2	22–1	22–1	22–1	22–2	18–3	23–1	20–4	13–4	7–3	0–0	3–3	18 / 53	230–36
Year-end championships
Tour Championships	A	A	F	F	QF	QF	SF	W	W	F	SF	QF	W	A	A	A	A	3 / 11	17–8
Tier I tournaments
Tokyo	Not Tier I							SF	A	W	W	W	F	W	QF	A	A	4 / 7	22–3
Chicago	Not Tier I				SF	Not Tier I							Not Held					0 / 1	2–1
Boca Raton	Not Tier I					W	W	Not Tier I			Not Held							2 / 2	8–0
Indian Wells	Not Held			Not Tier I							A	W	W	QF	F	A	1R	2 / 5	13–3
Miami	Not Tier I				A	3R	QF	QF	W	F	A	W	F	3R	2R	A	1R	2 / 10	26–7
Charleston	Not Tier I				F	W	W	W	F	F	A	A	QF	SF	A	A	A	3 / 8	24–5
Rome	NH	Not Tier I			A	A	SF	QF	W	W	A	A	A	SF	SF	A	QF	2 / 7	19–5
Berlin	Not Tier I				QF	W	F	W	W	QF	1R	F	W	A	A	A	2R	4 / 10	23–6
Montreal / Toronto	Not Tier I				2R	W	F	QF	A	A	A	A	A	A	A	A	QF	1 / 5	10–2
Zürich	Not Tier I							F	1R	1R	F	QF	1R	F	A	A	QF	0 / 8	11–7
Philadelphia	Not Held					Not Tier I		SF	W	QF	Not Tier I					Not Held		1 / 3	7–2
Moscow	Not Held										NTI	W	W	QF	A	A	1R	2 / 4	10–2
Career statistics
Year-end ranking	111	94	11	6	5	3	2	3	1	4	9	1	1	12	25	NR	46		

== Notes ==
Sporting positions
Preceded by (Argentina) Patricia Tarabini	Orange Bowl Girls' Singles Champion; Category: 18 and under 1987	Succeeded by (United States) Carrie Cunningham
