= Zurich Open =

Defunct tennis tournament
- Founded: 1984
- Abolished: 2008
- Editions: 25
- Location: Zürich; Switzerland
- Venue: Saalsporthalle (1984–1996); Schluefweg (1997–2004); Hallenstadion (2005–2008)
- Category: Tier I (1993–2007); Tier II (1990–1992, 2008); Category 4 (1989); Category 3 (1986–1988)
- Surface: Hard / Indoors
- Draw: 28M/32Q/16D
- Prize money: $1,340,000 $600,000 (from 2008)

The Zurich Open was a WTA Tour affiliated professional tennis tournament for women, formerly held every winter in Zürich, Switzerland. It was classified on the WTA Tour as a Tier I tournament from 1993 until 2007. In its final year, 2008, it was downgraded to a Tier II event.

The Open was held at the Hallenstadion, a multifunctional sports arena. It takes 150 specialist workers and 300 tonnes of material to prepare the Hallenstadion into the Zurich Open tennis venue. The event has two tennis courts available for tournament play.

Past champions of the tournament include former world number ones Steffi Graf, Lindsay Davenport, Martina Hingis, Venus Williams, Justine Henin and Maria Sharapova. Swiss champions included Hingis, Manuela Maleeva-Fragnière (formerly of Bulgaria) and Patty Schnyder.

== Name history ==
- European Indoors: 1984–1989
- BMW European Indoors: 1990–1992
- Barilla Indoors: 1993
- European Indoor Championships: 1994–1997
- European Swisscom Challenge: 1998
- Swisscom Challenge: 1999–2004
- Zurich Open: 2005–2007
- TENNIS.com Zurich Open: 2008
- BNP Paribas Zurich Open: 2012

== Past finals ==
=== Singles ===
Year	Champions	Runners-up	Score
1984	(United States) Zina Garrison	(West Germany) Claudia Kohde-Kilsch	6–1, 0–6, 6–2
1985	(United States) Zina Garrison	(Czechoslovakia) Hana Mandlíková	6–1, 6–3
1986	(West Germany) Steffi Graf	(Czechoslovakia) Helena Suková	4–6, 6–2, 6–4
1987	(West Germany) Steffi Graf	(Czechoslovakia) Hana Mandlíková	6–2, 6–2
↓ Category 3 ↓
1988	(United States) Pam Shriver	(Bulgaria) Manuela Maleeva-Fragnière	6–3, 6–4
↓ Category 4 ↓
1989	(West Germany) Steffi Graf	(Czechoslovakia) Jana Novotná	6–1, 7–6^{(8–6)}
↓ Tier II tournament ↓
1990	(West Germany) Steffi Graf	(Argentina) Gabriela Sabatini	6–3, 6–2
1991	(Germany) Steffi Graf	(France) Nathalie Tauziat	6–4, 6–4
1992	(Germany) Steffi Graf	(United States) Martina Navratilova	2–6, 7–5, 7–5
↓ Tier I tournament ↓
1993	(Switzerland) Manuela Maleeva-Fragnière	(United States) Martina Navratilova	6–3, 7–6^{(7–1)}
1994	(Bulgaria) Magdalena Maleeva	(Belarus) Natasha Zvereva	7–5, 3–6, 6–4
1995	(Croatia) Iva Majoli	(France) Mary Pierce	6–4, 6–4
1996	(Czech Republic) Jana Novotná	(Switzerland) Martina Hingis	6–2, 6–2
1997	(United States) Lindsay Davenport	(France) Nathalie Tauziat	7–6^{(7–3)}, 7–5
1998	(United States) Lindsay Davenport	(United States) Venus Williams	7–5, 6–3
1999	(United States) Venus Williams	(Switzerland) Martina Hingis	6–3, 6–4
2000	(Switzerland) Martina Hingis	(United States) Lindsay Davenport	6–4, 4–6, 7–5
2001	(United States) Lindsay Davenport	(Serbia and Montenegro) Jelena Dokić	6–3, 6–1
2002	(Switzerland) Patty Schnyder	(United States) Lindsay Davenport	6–7^{(7–5)}, 7–6^{(10–8)}, 6–3
2003	(Belgium) Justine Henin	(Serbia and Montenegro) Jelena Dokić	6–0, 6–4
2004	(Australia) Alicia Molik	(Russia) Maria Sharapova	4–6, 6–2, 6–3
2005	(United States) Lindsay Davenport	(Switzerland) Patty Schnyder	7–6^{(7–5)}, 6–3
2006	(Russia) Maria Sharapova	(Slovakia) Daniela Hantuchová	6–1, 4–6, 6–3
2007	(Belgium) Justine Henin	(France) Tatiana Golovin	6–4, 6–4
↓ Tier II tournament ↓
2008	(United States) Venus Williams	(Italy) Flavia Pennetta	7–6^{(7–1)}, 6–2

=== Doubles ===
Year	Champions	Runners-up	Score
1984	(United States) Andrea Leand (Hungary) Andrea Temesvári	(West Germany) Claudia Kohde-Kilsch (Czechoslovakia) Hana Mandlíková	6–1, 6–3
1985	(Czechoslovakia) Hana Mandlíková (Hungary) Andrea Temesvári	(West Germany) Claudia Kohde-Kilsch (Czechoslovakia) Helena Suková	6–4, 3–6, 7–5
1986	(West Germany) Steffi Graf (Argentina) Gabriela Sabatini	(United States) Lori McNeil (United States) Alycia Moulton	1–6, 6–4, 6–4
1987	(France) Nathalie Herreman (France) Pascale Paradis	(Czechoslovakia) Jana Novotná (France) Catherine Suire	6–3, 2–6, 6–3
↓ Category 3 ↓
1988	(France) Isabelle Demongeot (France) Nathalie Tauziat	(West Germany) Claudia Kohde-Kilsch (Czechoslovakia) Helena Suková	6–3, 6–3
↓ Category 4 ↓
1989	(Czechoslovakia) Jana Novotná (Czechoslovakia) Helena Suková	(Austria) Judith Polzl-Wiesner (France) Nathalie Tauziat	6–3, 3–6, 6–4
↓ Tier II tournament ↓
1990	(Netherlands) Manon Bollegraf (West Germany) Eva Pfaff	(France) Catherine Suire (South Africa) Dinky Van Rensburg	7–5, 6–4
1991	(Czechoslovakia) Jana Novotná (Czechoslovakia) Andrea Strnadová	(United States) Zina Garrison (United States) Lori McNeil	6–4, 6–3
1992	(Czechoslovakia) Helena Suková (Belarus) Natasha Zvereva	(United States) Martina Navratilova (United States) Pam Shriver	7–6^{(7–5)}, 6–4
↓ Tier I tournament ↓
1993	(United States) Zina Garrison (United States) Martina Navratilova	(United States) Gigi Fernández (Belarus) Natalia Zvereva	6–3, 5–7, 6–3
1994	(Netherlands) Manon Bollegraf (United States) Martina Navratilova	(United States) Patty Fendick (United States) Meredith McGrath	7–6^{(7–3)}, 6–1
1995	(United States) Nicole Arendt (Netherlands) Manon Bollegraf	(United States) Chanda Rubin (Netherlands) Caroline Vis	4–6, 7–6^{(7–4)}, 6–4
1996	(Switzerland) Martina Hingis (Czech Republic) Helena Suková	(United States) Nicole Arendt (Belarus) Natasha Zvereva	7–5, 6–4
1997	(Switzerland) Martina Hingis (Spain) Arantxa Sánchez	(Latvia) Larisa Savchenko-Neiland (Czech Republic) Helena Suková	4–6, 6–4, 6–1
1998	(United States) Serena Williams (United States) Venus Williams	(South Africa) Mariaan de Swardt (Ukraine) Elena Tatarkova	5–7, 6–1, 6–3
1999	(United States) Lisa Raymond (Australia) Rennae Stubbs	(France) Nathalie Tauziat (Belarus) Natasha Zvereva	6–2, 6–2
2000	(Switzerland) Martina Hingis (Russia) Anna Kournikova	(United States) Kimberly Po (France) Anne-Gaëlle Sidot	6–3, 6–4
2001	(United States) Lindsay Davenport (United States) Lisa Raymond	(France) Sandrine Testud (Italy) Roberta Vinci	6–3, 2–6, 6–2
2002	(Russia) Elena Bovina (Belgium) Justine Henin	(Serbia and Montenegro) Jelena Dokić (Russia) Nadia Petrova	6–2, 7–6^{(7–2)}
2003	(Belgium) Kim Clijsters (Japan) Ai Sugiyama	(Spain) Virginia Ruano (Argentina) Paola Suárez	7–6^{(7–3)}, 6–2
2004	(Zimbabwe) Cara Black (Australia) Rennae Stubbs	(Spain) Virginia Ruano (Argentina) Paola Suárez	6–4, 6–4
2005	(Zimbabwe) Cara Black (Australia) Rennae Stubbs	(Slovakia) Daniela Hantuchová (Japan) Ai Sugiyama	6–7^{(6–8)}, 7–6^{(7–4)}, 6–3
2006	(Zimbabwe) Cara Black (Australia) Rennae Stubbs	(South Africa) Liezel Huber (Slovenia) Katarina Srebotnik	7–5, 7–5
2007	(Czech Republic) Květa Peschke (Australia) Rennae Stubbs	(United States) Lisa Raymond (Italy) Francesca Schiavone	7–5, 7–6^{(7–1)}
↓ Tier II tournament ↓
2008	(Zimbabwe) Cara Black (United States) Liezel Huber	(Germany) Anna-Lena Grönefeld (Switzerland) Patty Schnyder	6–1, 7–6^{(7–3)}

== Records ==
- Most singles wins: (Germany) Steffi Graf (6)
- Most consecutive single wins: (Germany) Steffi Graf (4: 1989–1992)
