= 1993 Virginia Slims of Chicago – Singles =

Singles
- 1993 Virginia Slims of Chicago
- 1992 Champion: (United States) Martina Navratilova

Final
- Champion: (Federal Republic of Yugoslavia) Monica Seles
- Runner-up: (United States) Martina Navratilova
- Score: 3–6, 6–2, 6–1

Events
| Singles | Doubles |
| ← 1992 · | Virginia Slims of Chicago | · 1994 → |

Martina Navratilova was the defending champion but lost in the finals to top seed Monica Seles 3–6, 6–2, 6–1.

== Seeds ==
A champion seed is indicated in bold text while text in italics indicates the round in which that seed was eliminated. The top four seeds received a bye to the second round.

1. (Federal Republic of Yugoslavia) **Monica Seles (champion)**
2. (United States) Martina Navratilova (final)
3. (United States) Mary Joe Fernández (semifinals)
4. (Bulgaria) Katerina Maleeva (semifinals)
5. (United States) Zina Garrison-Jackson (quarterfinals)
6. (United States) Amy Frazier (first round)
7. (Netherlands) Brenda Schultz (quarterfinals)
8. (United States) Pam Shriver (quarterfinals)

== Draw ==
=== Key ===
- Q = Qualifier
- WC = Wild card
- LL = Lucky loser
- Alt = Alternate
- SE = Special exempt
- PR = Protected ranking
- ITF = ITF entry
- JE = Junior exempt
- w/o = Walkover
- r = Retired
- d = Defaulted
- SR = Special ranking

=== Final ===
| Final |
| 1 | (Federal Republic of Yugoslavia) **Monica Seles** | 3 | **6** | **6** |
| 2 | (United States) Martina Navratilova | **6** | 2 | 1 |

=== Section 1 ===
First round
(United States) **K Po** | **6** | **6**
WC | (Sweden) Å Carlsson | 0 | 3
(United States) **L Harvey-Wild** | **6** | **6**
(Australia) L Field | 2 | 1
(United States) S Stafford | 4 | 4
7 | (Netherlands) **B Schultz** | **6** | **6**
(United States) **A Grossman** | **6** | **7**
WC | (United States) B Nagelsen | 3 | 6
(Croatia) **I Majoli** | 4 | **6** | **6**
Q | (United States) S McCarthy | **6** | 2 | 0
(United States) **T Whitlinger** | **6** | 1 | **6**
6 | (United States) A Frazier | 3 | **6** | 1

Second round
1 | (Federal Republic of Yugoslavia) **M Seles** | **6** | **6**
(United States) K Po | 1 | 2
(United States) L Harvey-Wild | 1 | 2
7 | (Netherlands) **B Schultz** | **6** | **6**
3 | (United States) **MJ Fernández** | **6** | **6**
(United States) A Grossman | 4 | 2
(Croatia) **I Majoli** | **7** | **7**
(United States) T Whitlinger | 6 | 5

Quarterfinals
1 | (Federal Republic of Yugoslavia) **M Seles** | 4 | **7** | **6**
7 | (Netherlands) B Schultz | **6** | 6 | 4
3 | (United States) **MJ Fernández** | 4 | **6** | **6**
(Croatia) I Majoli | **6** | 1 | 2

Semifinals
1 | (Federal Republic of Yugoslavia) **M Seles** | **6** | **6**
3 | (United States) MJ Fernández | 3 | 0

=== Section 2 ===
First round
8 | (United States) **P Shriver** | **6** | **7**
(United States) D Graham | 0 | 5
(Netherlands) M Bollegraf | 3 | 6
Q | (United States) **A Keller** | **6** | **7**
Q | (France) S Amiach | **7** | 4 | 1
(United States) **M Werdel** | 6 | **6** | **6**
5 | (United States) **Z Garrison-Jackson** | **6** | **6**
(United States) L Raymond | 2 | 4
Q | (United States) K Adams | **7** | 2 | 3
(South Africa) **E Reinach** | 6 | **6** | **6**
(United States) L Allen | 6 | 2
(South Africa) **R Fairbank-Nideffer** | **7** | **6**

Second round
8 | (United States) **P Shriver** | **6** | **6**
(United States) A Keller | 2 | 1
(United States) M Werdel | 0 | 1
4 | (Bulgaria) **K Maleeva** | **6** | **6**
5 | (United States) **Z Garrison-Jackson** | **6** | **6**
(South Africa) E Reinach | 0 | 1
(South Africa) R Fairbank-Nideffer | 4 | 3
2 | (United States) **M Navratilova** | **6** | **6**

Quarterfinals
8 | (United States) P Shriver | **6** | 4 | 3
4 | (Bulgaria) **K Maleeva** | 4 | **6** | **6**
5 | (United States) Z Garrison-Jackson | 2 | 1
2 | (United States) **M Navratilova** | **6** | **6**

Semifinals
4 | (Bulgaria) K Maleeva | 0 | **6** | 1
2 | (United States) **M Navratilova** | **6** | 4 | **6**
