= 1995 Ameritech Cup – Doubles =

Doubles
- 1995 Ameritech Cup
- 1994 Champions: (United States) Gigi Fernández (Belarus) Natasha Zvereva

Final
- Champions: (Argentina) Gabriela Sabatini (Netherlands) Brenda Schultz
- Runners-up: (United States) Marianne Werdel (United States) Tami Whitlinger-Jones
- Score: 5–7, 7–6, 6–4

Details
- Draw: 16
- Seeds: 4

Events
Singles	Doubles
← 1994 ·	Ameritech Cup	· 1996 →

Gigi Fernández and Natasha Zvereva were the defending champions but only Zvereva competed that year with Lori McNeil.

McNeil and Zvereva lost in the semifinals to Marianne Werdel and Tami Whitlinger-Jones.

Gabriela Sabatini and Brenda Schultz won in the final 5–7, 7–6, 6–4 against Werdel and Whitlinger-Jones.

== Seeds ==
Champion seeds are indicated in bold text while text in italics indicates the round in which those seeds were eliminated.

1. (United States) Lori McNeil / (Belarus) Natasha Zvereva (semifinals)
2. (United States) Lisa Raymond / (United States) Pam Shriver (semifinals)
3. (Argentina) **Gabriela Sabatini** / (Netherlands) **Brenda Schultz (champions)**
4. (United States) Katrina Adams / (United States) Zina Garrison-Jackson (quarterfinals)

== Draw ==
=== Key ===
- Q = Qualifier
- WC = Wild card
- LL = Lucky loser
- Alt = Alternate
- SE = Special exempt
- PR = Protected ranking
- ITF = ITF entry
- JE = Junior exempt
- w/o = Walkover
- r = Retired
- d = Defaulted
- SR = Special ranking

First round
1	(United States) **L McNeil** (Belarus) **N Zvereva**	**6**	**6**
(Georgia (country)) N Louarsabishvili (United States) V Paynter	3	1
(United States) **D Graham** (Canada) **J Hetherington**	**6**	**6**
(United States) S McCarthy (United States) D Scott	3	1
4	(United States) **K Adams** (United States) **Z Garrison-Jackson**	3	**6**	**6**
(United States) L Harvey-Wild (United States) C Rubin	**6**	3	4
(Belgium) L Courtois (Russia) E Likhovtseva	6	4
WC	(United States) **M Werdel** (United States) **T Whitlinger-Jones**	**7**	**6**
(Canada) **M Bernard** (Canada) **C Delisle**	**7**	**7**
Q	(United States) S Reece (United States) J Steven	6	6
(Australia) N Bradtke (Australia) K Radford	3	4
3	(Argentina) **G Sabatini** (Netherlands) **B Schultz**	**6**	**6**
(United States) **A Frazier** (United States) **K Po**	**6**	**6**
(Italy) L Golarsa (South Africa) E Reinach	3	3
(Bulgaria) M Maleeva (South Africa) R Fairbank-Nideffer	3	4
2	(United States) **L Raymond** (United States) **P Shriver**	**6**	**6**

Quarterfinals
1	(United States) **L McNeil** (Belarus) **N Zvereva**	**6**	**7**
(United States) D Graham (Canada) J Hetherington	3	5
4	(United States) K Adams (United States) Z Garrison-Jackson	4	6
WC	(United States) **M Werdel** (United States) **T Whitlinger-Jones**	**6**	**7**
(Canada) M Bernard (Canada) C Delisle	4	4
3	(Argentina) **G Sabatini** (Netherlands) **B Schultz**	**6**	**6**
(United States) A Frazier (United States) K Po	5	3
2	(United States) **L Raymond** (United States) **P Shriver**	**7**	**6**

Semifinals
1	(United States) L McNeil (Belarus) N Zvereva	**6**	3	3
WC	(United States) **M Werdel** (United States) **T Whitlinger-Jones**	2	**6**	**6**
3	(Argentina) **G Sabatini** (Netherlands) **B Schultz**	**6**	**7**
2	(United States) L Raymond (United States) P Shriver	2	5

Final
WC	(United States) Marianne Werdel (United States) Tami Whitlinger-Jones	**7**	6	4
3	(Argentina) **Gabriela Sabatini** (Netherlands) **Brenda Schultz**	5	**7**	**6**
