= 1993 Virginia Slims of Chicago – Doubles =

Doubles
- 1993 Virginia Slims of Chicago

Final
- Champions: (United States) Katrina Adams; (United States) Zina Garrison-Jackson
- Runners-up: (United States) Amy Frazier; (United States) Kimberly Po
- Score: 7–6^{(9–7)}, 6–3

Events
Singles	Doubles
← 1992 ·	Virginia Slims of Chicago	· 1994 →

Martina Navratilova and Pam Shriver were the defending champions, but Navratilova did not compete this year. Shriver teamed up with Manon Bollegraf and lost in first round to Debbie Graham and Brenda Schultz.

Katrina Adams and Zina Garrison-Jackson won the title by defeating Amy Frazier and Kimberly Po 7–6^{(9–7)}, 6–3 in the final.

== Seeds ==
1. (Netherlands) Manon Bollegraf / (United States) Pam Shriver (first round)
2. (United States) Katrina Adams / (United States) Zina Garrison-Jackson (champions)
3. (United States) Louise Allen / (United States) Mary Lou Daniels (first round)
4. (United States) Shannan McCarthy / (United States) Marianne Werdel (quarterfinals)

== Draw ==
=== Key ===
- Q = Qualifier
- WC = Wild card
- LL = Lucky loser
- Alt = Alternate
- SE = Special exempt
- PR = Protected ranking
- ITF = ITF entry
- JE = Junior exempt
- w/o = Walkover
- r = Retired
- d = Defaulted
- SR = Special ranking

=== Draw ===
First round

Quarterfinals

Semifinals

Final

1
- (Netherlands) M Bollegraf
- (United States) P Shriver
2
6^{8}

(United States) D Graham
(Netherlands) B Schultz
6
7^{10}

(United States) D Graham
(Netherlands) B Schultz
6
6

(United States) A Grossman
(Germany) R Kochta
6
6

- (United States) A Grossman
- (Germany) R Kochta
1
2

- (United States) H Ludloff
- (Netherlands) C Vis
4
3

- (United States) D Graham
- (Netherlands) B Schultz
4
2

4
(United States) S McCarthy
(United States) M Werdel
6
1
6

(United States) A Frazier
(United States) K Po
6
6

- (Australia) L Field
- (United States) S Stafford
3
6
4

4
- (United States) S McCarthy
- (United States) M Werdel
4
6
4

(United States) A Frazier
(United States) K Po
6
6

(United States) A Frazier
(United States) K Po
6
0
6

- (France) S Amiach
- (United States) A Keller
3
3

- (United States) A Frazier
- (United States) K Po
6^{7}
3

WC
(United States) B Nagelsen
(Federal Republic of Yugoslavia) M Seles
6
6

2
(United States) K Adams
(United States) Z Garrison-Jackson
7^{9}
6

- (United States) Ta Whitlinger
- (United States) Te Whitlinger
0
4

WC
(United States) B Nagelsen
(Federal Republic of Yugoslavia) M Seles
6
6

(United States) J Emmons
(United States) L Harvey-Wild
6
6

- (United States) J Emmons
- (United States) L Harvey-Wild
3
2

3
- (United States) L Allen
- (United States) ML Daniels
1
4

WC
- (United States) B Nagelsen
- (Federal Republic of Yugoslavia) M Seles
4
1

- (Netherlands) I Driehuis
- (Sweden) M Lindström
3
4

2
(United States) K Adams
(United States) Z Garrison-Jackson
6
6

(South Africa) R Fairbank
(United States) M McGrath
6
6

- (South Africa) R Fairbank
- (United States) M McGrath
6
4
2

- (Sweden) Å Carlsson
- (Germany) C Schneider
2
0

2
(United States) K Adams
(United States) Z Garrison-Jackson
4
6
6

2
(United States) K Adams
(United States) Z Garrison-Jackson
6
6
