= 1990 Virginia Slims of Chicago – Doubles =

Doubles
- 1990 Virginia Slims of Chicago

Final
- Champions: (United States) Martina Navratilova (United States) Anne Smith
- Runners-up: (Spain) Arantxa Sánchez Vicario (France) Nathalie Tauziat
- Score: 6–7^{(9–11)}, 6–4, 6–3

Details
- Draw: 16
- Seeds: 4

Events
Singles	Doubles
← 1989 ·	Virginia Slims of Chicago	· 1991 →

The defending champions were Larisa Savchenko and Natasha Zvereva, but Savchenko chose not to participate. Zvereva partnered Patty Fendick, but lost in the quarterfinals to Arantxa Sánchez Vicario and Nathalie Tauziat.

Martina Navratilova and Anne Smith won the title, defeating Sánchez Vicario and Tauziat in the finals, 6–7^{(9–11)}, 6–4, 6–3.

== Seeds ==
1. (United States) Pam Shriver / (Australia) Elizabeth Smylie (quarterfinals)
2. (United States) Patty Fendick / (Soviet Union) Natasha Zvereva (quarterfinals)
3. (United States) Katrina Adams / (United States) Lori McNeil (second round)
4. (Netherlands) Brenda Schultz / (Hungary) Andrea Temesvári-Trunkos (first round)

== Draw ==
=== Key ===
- Q = Qualifier
- WC = Wild card
- LL = Lucky loser
- Alt = Alternate
- SE = Special exempt
- PR = Protected ranking
- ITF = ITF entry
- JE = Junior exempt
- w/o = Walkover
- r = Retired
- d = Defaulted
- SR = Special ranking

First round
1	(United States) P Shriver (Australia) E Smylie	6	6	7
(South Africa) R Fairbank-Nideffer (West Germany) C Kohde-Kilsch	1	7	6
(United States) C MacGregor (South Africa) D Van Rensburg	7	6
(United States) A Henricksson (United States) K Rinaldi	5	4
3	(United States) K Adams (United States) L McNeil	6	7
(United States) S Collins (United States) J Smoller	3	6
(United States) M Navratilova (United States) A Smith	6	6
(United States) L Allen (Peru) L Gildemeister	1	1
(United States) P Barg (United States) M Louie-Harper	7	1	6
(United States) M Daniels (United States) W White	6	6	7
(Spain) A Sánchez Vicario (France) N Tauziat	7	6
4	(Netherlands) B Schultz (Hungary) A Temesvári-Trunkos	6	3
(South Africa) L Gregory (United States) G Rush	6
(France) S Amiach (United States) H Ludloff	1^{r}
(Switzerland) M Maleeva-Fragniere (Australia) N Provis	2	3
2	(United States) P Fendick (Soviet Union) N Zvereva	6	6

Quarterfinals
1	(United States) P Shriver (Australia) E Smylie	6	6
(United States) C MacGregor (South Africa) D Van Rensburg	0	4
3	(United States) K Adams (United States) L McNeil	4	6	5
(United States) M Navratilova (United States) A Smith	6	4	7
(United States) M Daniels (United States) W White	4	7	3
(Spain) A Sánchez Vicario (France) N Tauziat	6	5	6
(United States) C MacGregor (South Africa) D Van Rensburg	2	3
2	(United States) P Fendick (Soviet Union) N Zvereva	6	6

Semifinals
1	(United States) P Shriver (Australia) E Smylie	3	0
(United States) M Navratilova (United States) A Smith	6	6
(Spain) A Sánchez Vicario (France) N Tauziat	6	7
2	(United States) P Fendick (Soviet Union) N Zvereva	3	6

Final
(United States) Martina Navratilova (United States) Anne Smith	6	6	6
(Spain) Arantxa Sánchez Vicario (France) Nathalie Tauziat	7	4	3
