= 1996 Ameritech Cup – Doubles =

Doubles
- 1996 Ameritech Cup
- 1995 Champions: (Argentina) Gabriela Sabatini (Netherlands) Brenda Schultz-McCarthy

Final
- Champions: (United States) Lisa Raymond (Australia) Rennae Stubbs
- Runners-up: (United States) Angela Lettiere (Japan) Nana Miyagi
- Score: 6–1, 6–1

Events
Singles	Doubles
← 1995 ·	Ameritech Cup	· 1997 →

Gabriela Sabatini and Brenda Schultz-McCarthy were the defending champions but did not compete that year.

Lisa Raymond and Rennae Stubbs won in the final 6–1, 6–1 against Angela Lettiere and Nana Miyagi.

== Seeds ==
Champion seeds are indicated in bold text while text in italics indicates the round in which those seeds were eliminated.

1. (United States) Meredith McGrath / (Czech Republic) Jana Novotná (quarterfinals)
2. (United States) Lindsay Davenport / (United States) Mary Joe Fernández (quarterfinals)
3. (United States) Nicole Arendt / (United States) Lori McNeil (semifinals)
4. (Switzerland) Martina Hingis / (United States) Linda Wild (quarterfinals)

== Draw ==
=== Key ===
- Q = Qualifier
- WC = Wild card
- LL = Lucky loser
- Alt = Alternate
- SE = Special exempt
- PR = Protected ranking
- ITF = ITF entry
- JE = Junior exempt
- w/o = Walkover
- r = Retired
- d = Defaulted
- SR = Special ranking

First round
1	(United States) **M McGrath** (Czech Republic) **J Novotná**	6	**6**	**6**
(Russia) E Likhovtseva (France) S Testud	**7**	3	0
(Argentina) L Montalvo (Argentina) P Suárez	5	1
(United States) **L Raymond** (Australia) **R Stubbs**	**7**	**6**
3	(United States) **N Arendt** (United States) **L McNeil**	**7**	**6**
(Canada) P Hy-Boulais (South Africa) R Nideffer	5	3
(United States) K Adams (United States) Z Garrison-Jackson	4	2
(United States) **A Frazier** (United States) **K Po**	**6**	**6**
(Indonesia) **Y Basuki** (Netherlands) **C Vis**	**6**	1	**6**
(United States) D Graham (United States) M Werdel-Witmeyer	3	**6**	4
(Canada) J Hetherington (United States) K Rinaldi-Stunkel	0	4
4	(Switzerland) **M Hingis** (United States) **L Wild**	**6**	**6**
(United States) **A Lettiere** (Japan) **N Miyagi**	**6**	1	**7**
(Canada) S Jeyaseelan (Canada) R Simpson	4	**6**	6
(Croatia) I Majoli (Romania) I Spîrlea	3	5
2	(United States) **L Davenport** (United States) **M J Fernández**	**6**	**7**

Quarterfinals
1	(United States) M McGrath (Czech Republic) J Novotná
(United States) **L Raymond** (Australia) **R Stubbs**	**w/o**
3	(United States) **N Arendt** (United States) **L McNeil**	**6**	1	**6**
(United States) A Frazier (United States) K Po	3	**6**	0
(Indonesia) **Y Basuki** (Netherlands) **C Vis**	5	**6**	**6**
4	(Switzerland) M Hingis (United States) L Wild	**7**	3	1
(United States) **A Lettiere** (Japan) **N Miyagi**	**7**	4	**7**
2	(United States) L Davenport (United States) M J Fernández	5	**6**	6

Semifinals
(United States) **L Raymond** (Australia) **R Stubbs**	4	**6**	**6**
3	(United States) N Arendt (United States) L McNeil	**6**	3	4
(Indonesia) Y Basuki (Netherlands) C Vis	4	**7**	4
(United States) **A Lettiere** (Japan) **N Miyagi**	**6**	6	**6**

Final
(United States) **Lisa Raymond** (Australia) **Rennae Stubbs**	**6**	**6**
(United States) Angela Lettiere (Japan) Nana Miyagi	1	1
