= 1996 Ameritech Cup – Singles =

Singles
- 1996 Ameritech Cup
- 1995 Champion: (Bulgaria) Magdalena Maleeva

Final
- Champion: (Czech Republic) Jana Novotná
- Runner-up: (United States) Jennifer Capriati
- Score: 6–4, 3–6, 6–1

Events
Singles	Doubles
← 1995 ·	Ameritech Cup	· 1997 →

Magdalena Maleeva was the defending champion but lost in the second round to Jennifer Capriati.

Jana Novotná won in the final 6–4, 3–6, 6–1 against Capriati.

== Seeds ==
A champion seed is indicated in bold text while text in italics indicates the round in which that seed was eliminated. The top four seeds received a bye to the second round.

1. (United States) Monica Seles (semifinals)
2. (Czech Republic) **Jana Novotná (champion)**
3. (United States) Lindsay Davenport (quarterfinals)
4. (Croatia) Iva Majoli (second round)
5. (Switzerland) Martina Hingis (semifinals)
6. (United States) Mary Joe Fernández (second round)
7. (Netherlands) Brenda Schultz-McCarthy (quarterfinals)
8. (Bulgaria) Magdalena Maleeva (second round)

== Draw ==
=== Key ===
- Q = Qualifier
- WC = Wild card
- LL = Lucky loser
- Alt = Alternate
- SE = Special exempt
- PR = Protected ranking
- ITF = ITF entry
- JE = Junior exempt
- w/o = Walkover
- r = Retired
- d = Defaulted
- SR = Special ranking

=== Final ===
Final
	(United States) Jennifer Capriati	4	**6**	1
2	(Czech Republic) **Jana Novotná**	**6**	3	**6**

=== Section 1 ===
First round
(United States) Z Garrison-Jackson	4	4
(Russia) **E Likhovtseva**	**6**	**6**
(Romania) **I Spîrlea**	**6**	**6**
Q	(United States) M Werdel-Witmeyer	3	0
WC	(United States) M Shaughnessy	2	4
6	(United States) **M J Fernández**	**6**	**6**
(United States) **M McGrath**	**6**	**6**
(Canada) P Hy-Boulais	4	3
(United States) L Raymond	5	6
(United States) **J Capriati**	**7**	**7**
(France) S Testud	3	2
8	(Bulgaria) **M Maleeva**	**6**	**6**

Second round
1	(United States) **M Seles**	**6**	**6**
(Russia) E Likhovtseva	2	1
(Romania) **I Spîrlea**	**6**	**6**
6	(United States) M J Fernández	1	2
4	(Croatia) I Majoli	3	2
(United States) **M McGrath**	**6**	**6**
(United States) **J Capriati**	**6**	5	**6**
8	(Bulgaria) M Maleeva	3	**7**	1

Quarterfinals
1	(United States) **M Seles**	**7**	**6**
(Romania) I Spîrlea	6	1
(United States) M McGrath	2	r
(United States) **J Capriati**	**5**

Semifinals
1	(United States) M Seles	3	3
(United States) **J Capriati**	**6**	**6**

=== Section 2 ===
First round
5	(Switzerland) **M Hingis**	**6**	**6**
Q	(United States) J Watanabe	1	1
Q	(United States) L Poruri	4	**7**	3
(Belgium) **S Devillé**	**6**	6	**6**
(Argentina) **P Suárez**	**6**	2	**7**
Q	(South Africa) L Horn	3	**6**	6
7	(Netherlands) **B Schultz-McCarthy**	**7**	6	**6**
(United States) L McNeil	6	**7**	4
(United States) **L Wild**	**6**	**6**
(United States) K Po	2	3
(United States) **A Frazier**	**6**	**7**
WC	(United States) M Tu	3	5

Second round
5	(Switzerland) **M Hingis**	**6**	**6**
(Belgium) S Devillé	1	2
(Argentina) P Suárez	6	0
3	(United States) **L Davenport**	**7**	**6**
7	(Netherlands) **B Schultz-McCarthy**	**7**	6	**7**
(United States) L Wild	5	**7**	6
(United States) A Frazier	2	1
2	(Czech Republic) **J Novotná**	**6**	**6**

Quarterfinals
5	(Switzerland) **M Hingis**	**6**	6	**6**
3	(United States) L Davenport	3	**7**	2
7	(Netherlands) B Schultz-McCarthy	2	5
2	(Czech Republic) **J Novotná**	**6**	**7**

Semifinals
5	(Switzerland) M Hingis	5	4
2	(Czech Republic) **J Novotná**	**7**	**6**
