= Serena Williams's early career =

Williams's career from 1995 to 1998

- Full name: Serena Jameka Williams
- Country: United States
- Calendar prize money: 1997: $37,947; 1998: 324,974

Singles
- Season record: 1997: 9–5 (64.29%); 1998: 29-11 (72.50%)
- Calendar titles: 0
- Year-end ranking: 1997: No. 99; 1998: No. 20
- Ranking change from previous year: 1997: ▲NR; 1998: ▲79

Grand Slam & significant results
- Australian Open: 1998: 2R
- French Open: 1998: 4R
- Wimbledon: 1998: 3R
- US Open: 1998: 3R

Doubles
- Season record: 1997: 4–2 (66.67%); 1998: 14-5 (73.68%)
- Calendar titles: 1998: 1
- Year-end ranking: 1997: No. 121; 1998: No. 36
- Ranking change from previous year: 1997: ▲NR; 1998: ▲85

Grand Slam doubles results
- Australian Open: 1998: 3R
- Wimbledon: 1998: 1R
- US Open: 1997: 1R

Mixed doubles
- Season record: 1998: 15-2 (88.24%)
- Calendar titles: 2

Grand Slam mixed doubles results
- Australian Open: 1998: 1R
- French Open: 1998: F
- Wimbledon: 1998: W
- US Open: 1998: W
- Last updated on: April 2, 2013.

The career of American tennis player Serena Williams began in 1995, but she did not compete in 1996. She continued through the 1997 season and ended in the top 20 in 1998. And was starting to already gain fame during these years of her doing tennis.

== 1995–1996 ==
Williams's first professional event was in October 1995, at the age of 14, at the Bell Challenge in Quebec City. She lost in the first round of qualifying to world no. 149 Annie Miller in less than an hour of play and earned US$240 in prize money.

Williams did not play a tournament in 1996.

== 1997 ==
Williams played the qualifying rounds of her first three tournaments of 1997, in the first round of State Farm Evert Cup, third round of Acura Classic and second round of European Indoor Championships, to Alexia Dechaume-Balleret, Magui Serna and Dominique Monami respectively. She then qualified for her first tour main draw when she defeated Magui Serna in the final round of qualifying at the Kremlin Cup, but lost in the first round of the main draw to compatriot Kimberly Po. In November, Williams entered the Ameritech Cup as a wild card and ranked no. 304. She earned her first main draw win against then world no. 27 Elena Likhovtseva in straight sets. In the next round, she upset world no. 7 Mary Pierce in two tight sets, with Williams failing to serve it out in the twelfth game of the second set but eventually won in a tie-break. In the quarterfinal she upset world no. 4 Monica Seles easing through the second and third sets, recording her first career wins over top 10 players and becoming the lowest-ranked player in the open era to defeat two top 10 opponents in one tournament. She also became the lowest ranked player to defeat a Top 5 player since unranked Stephanie Rehe defeated No. 3 Gabriela Sabatini at 1990 Hilton Head. She ultimately lost in the semifinals to world no. 5 Lindsay Davenport 4-6 in both sets. Her run in Chicago propelled Williams into the Top 100 for the first time in her career, and she finished 1997 ranked No. 99 in the world.

In doubles, she paired with sister Venus Williams in three events, reaching the quarterfinals of State Farm Evert Cup losing to third seeds Lindsay Davenport and Natasha Zvereva easily and the semifinals of the Ameritech Cup withdrawing before their match against compatriots Lindsay Davenport and Monica Seles.

== 1998 ==
=== Adidas International ===
Williams began her 1998 by entering the qualifying draw of the Adidas International. Williams qualified by defeating No. 64 Laura Golarsa in the final round losing just two games. In the main draw she was made to work in three sets against Mirjana Lučić coming from a set down to advance. She then faced Frenchwoman Sandrine Testud and was a set and 3-0 up when her opponent retired. In the quarterfinals, Williams took on world no. 3 Lindsay Davenport. Williams was down a set and faced two match points in the 8th game of the second. Williams came back and won the last two sets in the 12th game of each. Williams's run was ended by Arantxa Sánchez Vicario in the semifinals when Williams fell, winning only 2 games in each set. World-ranked No. 53 on 19 January 1998, became the third-highest ranked player after three major-tour main draw events since 1976.

=== Australian Open ===
Williams then competed in her first slam at the Australian Open. In her first match, she faced Romanian Irina Spîrlea. Spîrlea won the first set in a tie-breaker, however, Williams came back to take the next two sets with relative ease dropping just four games. In the following round, Williams faced her older sister Venus Williams in their first professional match. The first set went to a tie-break, which Venus won and from then on carried the momentum to win the second set only dropping one game.

Williams paired with sister Venus Williams and moved through the third round with straight sets victory over Erika deLone and Liezel Horn, and a three-set comeback victory over Rika Hiraki and Mercedes Paz. However, they fell in straights to the Japanese duo of Naoko Kijimuta and Nana Smith.

Williams also played Mixed doubles and partnered with local Lleyton Hewitt, however, they faltered in the first round in straight sets to Natasha Zvereva and Andrew Florent.

=== IGA Tennis Classic ===
Williams headed to the United States in Oklahoma in the IGA Tennis Classic. In the first round she faced compatriot Katrina Adams and won in straight sets in just 44 minutes, breaking Adams twice in both sets. She then faced Australian Annabel Ellwood in the following round and cruised through with a straight set victory. In the quarterfinals, she faced Joannette Kruger and fell in a lop-sided loss winning only two games in the match, one in each set.

In the doubles, she and sister Venus Williams cruised through their first title as a team without dropping a set defeating the teams of Surina De Beer and Lindsay Lee-Waters, Katrina Adams and Debbie Graham, Laura Golarsa and Liezel Horn, and Cătălina Cristea and Kristine Kunce in the final.

=== State Farm Evert Cup and Lipton Championships ===
Williams then stayed in the USA, playing at the Lipton Championships. Williams began her tournament against Denisa Chládková and won easily losing four games including a bagel in the second set. In the next round she faced Irina Spîrlea, the world no. 10. The first set went to a tie-break, which Williams won, Williams then stormed through the second set with a bagel. By defeating 10th-ranked Spirlea in only her 16th career WTA Tour main-draw singles match, she defeated five Top 10 players faster than any player in the history of professional women's tennis, breaking the previous record set by Monica Seles in 1989 who recorded her fifth career Top 10 victory in her 33rd main-draw match. Williams then had an easier match in the Round of 32, defeating Barbara Paulus in straight sets. In the fourth round, she faced Swiss no. 2 Patty Schnyder, Williams won the first set in a bagel, however her higher ranked opponent took the second set. Williams then took control of the final set taking it in the ninth game. In the final 8, Williams took on world no. 1 Martina Hingis and took the first set, however, Hingis came back to push it to a decider. The decider went to a tie-breaker which Hingis took.

Williams chose to compete at the State Farm Evert Cup but only in doubles with sister Venus Williams they were able to get to the quarterfinals without dropping a set but fell to Martina Hingis and Mirjana Lučić in three sets. They also played at the Lipton Championships but fell in their first match to the team of Els Callens and Patricia Hy-Boulais.

=== Campionati Internazionali d’Italia ===
Williams then played at the Campionati Internazionali d’Italia, in her first clay court tournament. Her first opponent was 11th seed Nathalie Tauziat, Williams came through in a tough first set, but won the second set with ease in a bagel scoreline to upset her seeded opponent. In her next match, Williams advanced when her opponent South African Joannette Kruger retired with a back injury in the seventh game when Williams was leading by a double break. In the following round she faced 8th seed Conchita Martínez and won with ease in straight sets, losing two games in each. In the quarterfinals, she faced sister Venus Williams for the second time in the year and like their previous encounter Serena lost in straight sets.

In doubles, she played with sister Venus and they cruised through the first three rounds in straight sets defeating the teams of Naoko Kijimuta and Nana Smith, Virág Csurgó and Yuka Yoshida, and Katrina Adams and Manon Bollegraf. In the semifinals, they faced Virginia Ruano Pascual and Paola Suárez, the Williams sisters won the first set but lost the second and third.

=== French Open ===
Williams then played in the second slam of the year at the clay courts of Roland Garros. In her debut match, she faced Canadian Jana Nejedly and won in three sets, Williams came through despite losing the second set easily, winning only a game. In her next match, she faced compatriot Corina Morariu and won with ease dropping only a game. In the third round, Williams took on Dominique Monami and won in a double breadstick. In the round of 16, Williams faced world no. 5 Arantxa Sánchez Vicario, Williams was up by a set and was serving for the match in the ninth game, but eventually lost in three.

Williams also played mixed doubles with Argentinian Luis Lobo. Williams and Lobo won their first two matches against the teams of Helena Vildová and Pavel Vízner, and Larisa Savchenko and Leander Paes. In the third round they faced the American pairing of Ginger Helgeson-Nielsen and Jim Grabb, they split the first two sets, however Williams and Lobo dominated the third without dropping a game. They then had little difficulty putting out the pairings of Kristie Boogert and Donald Johnson, and Rachel McQuillan and David Macpherson to advance to the title match. In the final they faced sister Venus Williams and Justin Gimelstob. Serena and Lobo led by a break by the fifth game in the first set just to lose the next five games. Venus and Gimelstob took the second set by the same scoreline.

=== Direct Line Insurance Championships ===
Williams then played her first grass tournament at the Direct Line Insurance Championships, she faced two Japanese players in her first two matches taking on Naoko Sawamatsu and Ai Sugiyama, she won both matches in straight sets. In the quarterfinals, she again faced Arantxa Sánchez Vicario for the second time in three weeks and once again lost in three sets after winning the first set.

=== Wimbledon Championships ===
Williams next event was the Wimbledon Championships, Williams's first round opponent was Laura Golarsa and won in two sets with a break lead in each. Williams then faced Mirjana Lučić in the next round and dominated losing only three games, including a bagel in the second set. In the third round, Williams faced Spaniard Virginia Ruano Pascual and was down by a set and just won a game after losing the first four in the first set, when she retired due to leg injury, however after the match, Williams said that she could have finished the match.

She and sister Venus were supposed to compete in doubles, but withdrew before their first round match against Naoko Kijimuta and Nana Smith.

Williams once again played in the Mixed Doubles, but this time partnering Belorussian Max Mirnyi. In their first match, they faced Cătălina Cristea and Geoff Grant winning by a breadstick and a tie-break. In their next matches, they were pushed to three sets, coming back from a set down against the teams of Lindsay Davenport and Brian MacPhie, and Nathalie Tauziat and Daniel Nestor. In the quarterfinals, they faced the Australian team of Kristine Kunce and Sandon Stolle and won in three dropping the second set. In the following match they defeated the Dutch team of Caroline Vis and Paul Haarhuis and for the third time came back from a set down. In the final they faced Mirjana Lučić and Mahesh Bhupathi and won in straight sets, losing four games in both sets. This win gave both Williams and Mirnyi their first slam title.

=== Toshiba TennisClassic ===
Williams then came to the States and competed at the Toshiba TennisClassic. In the first round she faced Larisa Neiland and demolished the Latvian with a double bagel in just 38 minutes and losing only 19 points. In the second round she faced Sandrine Testud and won three dropping the second set. In the final 8, she took on world no. 1 Martina Hingis and fell quite convincingly, winning just five games to the top player.

=== US Open ===
Williams then competed in the final slam of the year at the US Open. In her first match, Williams had to battle with Australian Nicole Pratt, when she dropped the second set, but finally came through in three. However, her next match was easier taking on Kiwi's Pavlina Nola, Williams just dropped three games to advance. In the third round, she faced Irina Spîrlea, Williams had won their two previous matches in the year, however Spîrlea took the first set just to see Williams come back in the second winning it in a bagel. In the final set, Williams was broken in the 11th game and Spîrlea took advantage and closed it out in the next game to eliminate Williams.

For the second slam in a row, Williams played mixed doubles with Max Mirnyi. In their first two matches, they came through easily defeating Miriam Oremans and Nicklas Kulti in straight sets and having a walkover over Americans Lindsay Davenport and Jan-Michael Gambill. In a repeat of the Wimbledon mixed doubles final, they faced Mirjana Lučić and Mahesh Bhupathi, Williams and Mirnyi dropped the first set, but took the final two sets at five. In the semifinals, they had to battle hard against Debbie Graham and Sandon Stolle, as both teams traded the first two sets both going to a tie-break. In the final set Williams and Mirnyi took it with ease to advance. In the final they faced the American team of Lisa Raymond and Patrick Galbraith. The American-Belorussian team came through in two easy sets over the American team to claim their second straight slam as a team.

=== Porsche Tennis Grand Prix ===
In her final tournament in singles in the year, Williams played at the Porsche Tennis Grand Prix. In her opening match she took on Květa Hrdličková, and was pushed in three set, but came through winning the final set with a bagel. In the second round, she faced another Czech third seed Jana Novotná, the pair split the first two sets, however Novotná being down a break retired after twisting her back. Williams then fell to France's Sandrine Testud despite coming back to take the second set.

In the doubles, she paired with sister Venus Williams but fell in the first round to Lisa Raymond and Rennae Stubbs, losing in a tie-break and a breadstick.

=== European Championships and MGTS Kremlin Cup ===
Williams chose to play only in the doubles of the European Championships pairing with sister Venus Williams, they faced top seeds Lindsay Davenport and Natasha Zvereva, they produced an upset in straight sets. They then came through coming back from a set down against Amanda Coetzer and Anna Kournikova. In the semifinals they defeated Manon Bollegraf and Debbie Graham in a tough first set but came through easily in the second. In the final, they came back from a set down against Mariaan De Swardt and Elena Tatarkova, to claim their second title as a team and their biggest title so far.

The pair also chose to compete at the MGTS Kremlin Cup and came through their tough first match against Elena Likhovtseva and Ai Sugiyama, winning it in a tie-break in the third set. However, they withdrew prior to their quarterfinal match against Anna Kournikova and Monica Seles.

Williams finished 1998 ranked No. 20 in singles, the fastest to that milestone in history. In 1998 alone, she recorded five wins against Top 10 players.

== All matches ==
=== Singles matches ===
Year	Tournament	Match	Round	Opponent	Rank	Result	Score
1995	Bell Challenge; Quebec City, Canada; Tier III; Hard, outdoor 30 October–5 November 1995	1	Q1	(United States) Annie Miller	#148	Loss	1–6, 1–6
1997	State Farm Evert Cup; Indian Wells, United States; Tier I Hard, outdoor 3 –16 March 1997	2	Q1	(France) Alexia Dechaume-Balleret	#87	Loss	4–6, 0–6
1997	Acura Classic; Los Angeles, United States; Tier II; Hard, outdoor 4 –10 August 1997	3	Q1	(United States) Amanda Basica	#755	Win	6–1, 6–4
1997	Acura Classic; Los Angeles, United States; Tier II; Hard, outdoor 4 –10 August 1997	4	Q2	(Thailand) Tamarine Tanasugarn	#44	Win	3–6, 6–2, 6–3
1997	Acura Classic; Los Angeles, United States; Tier II; Hard, outdoor 4 –10 August 1997	5	Q3	(Spain) Magui Serna	#54	Loss	6–7^{(6–8)}, 6–4, 3–6
1997	European Indoor Championships; Zurich, Switzerland; Tier I Hard, outdoor 13 –19 October 1997	6	Q1	(Italy) Gloria Pizzichini	#88	Win	6–2, 6–4
1997	European Indoor Championships; Zurich, Switzerland; Tier I Hard, outdoor 13 –19 October 1997	7	Q2	(Belgium) Dominique Monami	#29	Loss	2–6, 4–6
1997	Kremlin Cup; Moscow, Russia; Tier I Carpet, indoor 27 October - 2 November 1997	8	Q1	(Russia) Anastasia Myskina	#619	Win	6–0, 6–4
1997	Kremlin Cup; Moscow, Russia; Tier I Carpet, indoor 27 October - 2 November 1997	9	Q2	(Sweden) Åsa Svensson	#46	Win	6–2, 6–3
1997	Kremlin Cup; Moscow, Russia; Tier I Carpet, indoor 27 October - 2 November 1997	10	Q3	(Spain) Magui Serna	#42	Win	6–0, 7–6^{(13-11)}
1997	Kremlin Cup; Moscow, Russia; Tier I Carpet, indoor 27 October - 2 November 1997	11	1R	(United States) Kimberly Po	#22	Loss	3–6, 6–7^{(6–8)}
1997	Ameritech Cup; Chicago, United States; Tier II; Carpet, indoor 3–9 November 1997	12	1R	(Russia) Elena Likhovtseva	#27	Win	6–3, 7–5
1997	Ameritech Cup; Chicago, United States; Tier II; Carpet, indoor 3–9 November 1997	13	2R	(France) Mary Pierce	#7	Win	6–3, 7–6^{(7–3)}
1997	Ameritech Cup; Chicago, United States; Tier II; Carpet, indoor 3–9 November 1997	14	QF	(United States) Monica Seles	#4	Win	4–6, 6–1, 6–1
1997	Ameritech Cup; Chicago, United States; Tier II; Carpet, indoor 3–9 November 1997	15	SF	(United States) Lindsay Davenport	#5	Loss	4–6, 4–6
1998	Adidas International; Sydney, Australia; Tier II; Hard, outdoor 12–18 January 1998	16	Q1	(Italy) Gloria Pizzichini	#89	Win	6–3, 6–1
1998	Adidas International; Sydney, Australia; Tier II; Hard, outdoor 12–18 January 1998	17	Q2	(United States) Corina Morariu	#55	Win	7–5, 6–4
1998	Adidas International; Sydney, Australia; Tier II; Hard, outdoor 12–18 January 1998	18	Q3	(Italy) Laura Golarsa	#64	Win	6–2, 6–0
1998	Adidas International; Sydney, Australia; Tier II; Hard, outdoor 12–18 January 1998	19	1R	(Croatia) Mirjana Lučić	#48	Win	3–6, 6–4, 7–5
1998	Adidas International; Sydney, Australia; Tier II; Hard, outdoor 12–18 January 1998	20	2R	(France) Sandrine Testud	#13	Win	7–6^{(7–5)}, 3–0 RET
1998	Adidas International; Sydney, Australia; Tier II; Hard, outdoor 12–18 January 1998	21	QF	(United States) Lindsay Davenport	#3	Win	1–6, 7–5, 7–5
1998	Adidas International; Sydney, Australia; Tier II; Hard, outdoor 12–18 January 1998	22	SF	(Spain) Arantxa Sánchez Vicario	#9	Loss	2–6, 1–6
1998	Australian Open; Melbourne, Australia; Grand Slam; Hard, outdoor 19 January - 1 February 1998	23	1R	(Romania) Irina Spîrlea	#9	Win	6–7^{(7–9)}, 6–3, 6–1
1998	Australian Open; Melbourne, Australia; Grand Slam; Hard, outdoor 19 January - 1 February 1998	24	2R	(United States) Venus Williams	#16	Loss	6–7^{(4–7)}, 1–6
1998	IGA Tennis Classic; Oklahoma City, USA; Tier III; Hard, outdoor 23 February - 1 March 1998	25	1R	(United States) Katrina Adams	#286	Win	6–1, 6–2
1998	IGA Tennis Classic; Oklahoma City, USA; Tier III; Hard, outdoor 23 February - 1 March 1998	26	2R	(Australia) Annabel Ellwood	#110	Win	6–1, 6–3
1998	IGA Tennis Classic; Oklahoma City, USA; Tier III; Hard, outdoor 23 February - 1 March 1998	27	QF	(South Africa) Joannette Kruger	#27	Loss	1–6, 1–6
1998	Lipton Championships; Miami, USA; Tier I Hard, outdoor 16–29 March 1998	28	1R	(Czech Republic) Denisa Chládková	#59	Win	6–4, 6–0
1998	Lipton Championships; Miami, USA; Tier I Hard, outdoor 16–29 March 1998	29	2R	(Romania) Irina Spîrlea	#10	Win	7–6^{(7–4)}, 6–0
1998	Lipton Championships; Miami, USA; Tier I Hard, outdoor 16–29 March 1998	30	3R	(Austria) Barbara Paulus	#26	Win	6–3, 6–2
1998	Lipton Championships; Miami, USA; Tier I Hard, outdoor 16–29 March 1998	31	4R	(Switzerland) Patty Schnyder	#17	Win	6–0, 4–6, 6–3
1998	Lipton Championships; Miami, USA; Tier I Hard, outdoor 16–29 March 1998	32	QF	(Switzerland) Martina Hingis	#1	Loss	3–6, 6–1, 6–7^{(4–7)}
1998	Campionati Internazionali d’Italia; Rome, Italy; Tier I Clay, outdoor 4–10 May 1998	33	1R	(France) Nathalie Tauziat	#12	Win	7–5, 6–0
1998	Campionati Internazionali d’Italia; Rome, Italy; Tier I Clay, outdoor 4–10 May 1998	34	2R	(South Africa) Joannette Kruger	#21	Win	5–1 ret
1998	Campionati Internazionali d’Italia; Rome, Italy; Tier I Clay, outdoor 4–10 May 1998	35	3R	(Spain) Conchita Martínez	#8	Win	6–2, 6–2
1998	Campionati Internazionali d’Italia; Rome, Italy; Tier I Clay, outdoor 4–10 May 1998	36	QF	(United States) Venus Williams	#9	Loss	4–6, 2–6
1998	French Open; Paris, France; Grand Slam; Clay, outdoor 25 May - 7 June 1998	37	1R	(Canada) Jana Nejedly	#97	Win	6–2, 1–6, 6–4
1998	French Open; Paris, France; Grand Slam; Clay, outdoor 25 May - 7 June 1998	38	2R	(United States) Corina Morariu	#43	Win	6–1, 6–0
1998	French Open; Paris, France; Grand Slam; Clay, outdoor 25 May - 7 June 1998	39	3R	(Belgium) Dominique Monami	#14	Win	6–1, 6–1
1998	French Open; Paris, France; Grand Slam; Clay, outdoor 25 May - 7 June 1998	40	4R	(Spain) Arantxa Sánchez Vicario	#5	Loss	6–4, 5–7, 3–6
1998	Direct Line Insurance Championships; Eastbourne, Great Britain; Tier II; Grass, outdoor 15–21 June 1998	41	1R	(Japan) Naoko Sawamatsu	#34	Win	6–4, 7–5
1998	Direct Line Insurance Championships; Eastbourne, Great Britain; Tier II; Grass, outdoor 15–21 June 1998	42	2R	(Japan) Ai Sugiyama	#17	Win	6–2, 7–5
1998	Direct Line Insurance Championships; Eastbourne, Great Britain; Tier II; Grass, outdoor 15–21 June 1998	43	QF	(Spain) Arantxa Sánchez Vicario	#4	Loss	6–4, 4–6, 4–6
1998	Wimbledon Championships; London, Great Britain; Grand Slam; Grass, outdoor 23 June - 5 July 1998	44	1R	(Italy) Laura Golarsa	#77	Win	6–4, 6–3
1998	Wimbledon Championships; London, Great Britain; Grand Slam; Grass, outdoor 23 June - 5 July 1998	45	2R	(Croatia) Mirjana Lučić	#46	Win	6–3, 6–0
1998	Wimbledon Championships; London, Great Britain; Grand Slam; Grass, outdoor 23 June - 5 July 1998	46	3R	(Spain) Virginia Ruano Pascual	#47	Loss	5–7, 1–4 ret
1998	Toshiba TennisClassic; Los Angeles, USA; Tier II; Hard, outdoor 10–16 August 1998	47	1R	(Latvia) Larisa Neiland	#90	Win	6–0, 6–0
1998	Toshiba TennisClassic; Los Angeles, USA; Tier II; Hard, outdoor 10–16 August 1998	48	2R	(France) Sandrine Testud	#14	Win	6–4, 3–6, 6–1
1998	Toshiba TennisClassic; Los Angeles, USA; Tier II; Hard, outdoor 10–16 August 1998	49	QF	(Switzerland) Martina Hingis	#1	Loss	4–6, 1–6
1998	US Open; New York City, USA; Grand Slam; Hard, outdoor 31 August - 13 September 1998	50	1R	(Australia) Nicole Pratt	#94	Win	6–3, 3–6, 6–4
1998	US Open; New York City, USA; Grand Slam; Hard, outdoor 31 August - 13 September 1998	51	2R	(New Zealand) Pavlina Nola	#124	Win	6–2, 6–1
1998	US Open; New York City, USA; Grand Slam; Hard, outdoor 31 August - 13 September 1998	52	3R	(Romania) Irina Spîrlea	#8	Loss	3–6, 6–0, 5–7
1998	Porsche Tennis Grand Prix; Filderstadt, Germany; Tier II; Hard, outdoor 5–11 October 1998	53	1R	(Czech Republic) Květa Hrdličková	#64	Win	7–6^{(7–5)}, 3–6, 6–0
1998	Porsche Tennis Grand Prix; Filderstadt, Germany; Tier II; Hard, outdoor 5–11 October 1998	54	2R	(Czech Republic) Jana Novotná	#3	Win	2–6, 6–3, 2–0 ret
1998	Porsche Tennis Grand Prix; Filderstadt, Germany; Tier II; Hard, outdoor 5–11 October 1998	55	QF	(France) Sandrine Testud	#18	Loss	4–6, 6–1, 1–6

=== Doubles matches ===
Year	Tournament	Match	Round	Partner	Opponents	Rank	Result	Score
1997	State Farm Evert Cup; Indian Wells, United States; Tier I Hard, outdoor 3 –16 March 1997	1	1R	(United States) Venus Williams	(Spain) Conchita Martínez (Argentina) Patricia Tarabini	#25 #26	Win	4–6, 7–6^{(7–5)}, 7–5
1997	State Farm Evert Cup; Indian Wells, United States; Tier I Hard, outdoor 3 –16 March 1997	2	2R	(United States) Venus Williams	(Sweden) Åsa Svensson (France) Anne-Gaëlle Sidot	#89 #83	Win	0–6, 6–3, 6–3
1997	State Farm Evert Cup; Indian Wells, United States; Tier I Hard, outdoor 3 –16 March 1997	3	QF	(United States) Venus Williams	(United States) Lindsay Davenport (Belarus) Natasha Zvereva	#7 #4	Loss	3–6, 0–6
1997	US Open; New York City, USA; Grand Slam; Hard, outdoor 31 August - 13 September 1998	4	1R	(United States) Venus Williams	(Canada) Jill Hetherington (United States) Kathy Rinaldi Stunkel	#104 #102	Loss	4–6, 5–7
1997	Ameritech Cup; Chicago, United States; Tier II; Carpet, indoor 3–9 November 1997	5	1R	(United States) Venus Williams	(Romania) Ruxandra Dragomir Ilie (Croatia) Iva Majoli	#22 #37	Win	6–0, 6–0
1997	Ameritech Cup; Chicago, United States; Tier II; Carpet, indoor 3–9 November 1997	6	QF	(United States) Venus Williams	(Netherlands) Manon Bollegraf (United States) Mary Joe Fernandez	#8 #9	Win	7–6^{(7–2)}, 6–2
1997	Ameritech Cup; Chicago, United States; Tier II; Carpet, indoor 3–9 November 1997	-	SF	(United States) Venus Williams	(United States) Lindsay Davenport (United States) Monica Seles	#1 #84	Withdrew	N/A
1998	Australian Open; Melbourne, Australia; Grand Slam; Hard, outdoor 19 January - 1 February 1998	7	1R	(United States) Venus Williams	(United States) Erika deLone (South Africa) Liezel Horn	#99 #103	Win	6–4, 6–2
1998	Australian Open; Melbourne, Australia; Grand Slam; Hard, outdoor 19 January - 1 February 1998	8	2R	(United States) Venus Williams	(Japan) Rika Hiraki (Argentina) Mercedes Paz	#28 #49	Win	2–6, 6–2, 6–2
1998	Australian Open; Melbourne, Australia; Grand Slam; Hard, outdoor 19 January - 1 February 1998	9	3R	(United States) Venus Williams	(Japan) Naoko Kijimuta (Japan) Nana Smith	#23 #19	Loss	3–6, 3–6
1998	IGA Tennis Classic; Oklahoma City, USA; Tier III; Hard, outdoor 23 February - 1 March 1998	10	1R	(United States) Venus Williams	(South Africa) Surina De Beer (United States) Lindsay Lee-Waters	#208 #86	Win	6–4, 7–5
1998	IGA Tennis Classic; Oklahoma City, USA; Tier III; Hard, outdoor 23 February - 1 March 1998	11	QF	(United States) Venus Williams	(United States) Katrina Adams (United States) Debbie Graham	#22 #37	Win	6–4, 4–3 ret
1998	IGA Tennis Classic; Oklahoma City, USA; Tier III; Hard, outdoor 23 February - 1 March 1998	12	SF	(United States) Venus Williams	(Italy) Laura Golarsa (South Africa) Liezel Horn	#84 #102	Win	6–2, 6–2
1998	IGA Tennis Classic; Oklahoma City, USA; Tier III; Hard, outdoor 23 February - 1 March 1998	13	F	(United States) Venus Williams	(Romania) Cătălina Cristea (Austria) Kristine Kunce	#93 #50	Win	7–5, 6–2
1998	State Farm Evert Cup; Indian Wells, USA; Tier I Hard, outdoor 2–15 March 1998	14	1R	(United States) Venus Williams	(Romania) Cătălina Cristea (Australia) Annabel Ellwood	#84 #66	Win	6–4, 6–3
1998	State Farm Evert Cup; Indian Wells, USA; Tier I Hard, outdoor 2–15 March 1998	15	2R	(United States) Venus Williams	(Spain) Conchita Martínez (Argentina) Patricia Tarabini	#19 #17	Win	6–4, 6–1
1998	State Farm Evert Cup; Indian Wells, USA; Tier I Hard, outdoor 2–15 March 1998	16	QF	(United States) Venus Williams	(Switzerland) Martina Hingis (Croatia) Mirjana Lučić	#3 #31	Loss	5–7, 6–4, 1–6
1998	Lipton Championships; Miami, USA; Tier I Hard, outdoor 16–29 March 1998	17	1R	(United States) Venus Williams	(Belgium) Els Callens (Canada) Patricia Hy-Boulais	#54 #116	Loss	4–6, 4–6
1998	Campionati Internazionali d’Italia; Rome, Italy; Tier I Clay, outdoor 4–10 May 1998	18	1R	(United States) Venus Williams	(Japan) Naoko Kijimuta (Japan) Nana Smith	#24 #22	Win	6–4, 6–4
1998	Campionati Internazionali d’Italia; Rome, Italy; Tier I Clay, outdoor 4–10 May 1998	19	2R	(United States) Venus Williams	(Hungary) Virág Csurgó (Japan) Yuka Yoshida	#122 #68	Win	7–6^{(9–7)}, 6–4
1998	Campionati Internazionali d’Italia; Rome, Italy; Tier I Clay, outdoor 4–10 May 1998	20	QF	(United States) Venus Williams	(United States) Katrina Adams (Netherlands) Manon Bollegraf	#23 #5	Win	6–2, 6–1
1998	Campionati Internazionali d’Italia; Rome, Italy; Tier I Clay, outdoor 4–10 May 1998	21	SF	(United States) Venus Williams	(Spain) Virginia Ruano Pascual (Argentina) Paola Suárez	#73 #49	Loss	6–2, 4–6, 5–7
1998	Wimbledon Championships; London, Great Britain; Grand Slam; Grass, outdoor 23 June - 5 July 1998	-	1R	(United States) Venus Williams	(Japan) Naoko Kijimuta (Japan) Nana Smith	#24 #23	Withdrew	N/A
1998	Porsche Tennis Grand Prix; Filderstadt, Germany; Tier II; Hard, outdoor 5–11 October 1998	22	1R	(United States) Venus Williams	(United States) Lisa Raymond (Australia) Rennae Stubbs	#13 #14	Loss	6–7^{(5–7)}, 1–6
1998	European Championships; Zurich, Switzerland; Tier I Hard, indoor 12–18 October 1998	23	1R	(United States) Venus Williams	(United States) Lindsay Davenport (Belarus) Natasha Zvereva	#3 #4	Win	7–6^{(8–6)}, 6–2
1998	European Championships; Zurich, Switzerland; Tier I Hard, indoor 12–18 October 1998	24	QF	(United States) Venus Williams	(South Africa) Amanda Coetzer (Russia) Anna Kournikova	#32 #13	Win	1–6, 6–1, 6–2
1998	European Championships; Zurich, Switzerland; Tier I Hard, indoor 12–18 October 1998	25	SF	(United States) Venus Williams	(Netherlands) Manon Bollegraf (United States) Debbie Graham	#19 #26	Win	7–6^{(10–8)}, 6–2
1998	European Championships; Zurich, Switzerland; Tier I Hard, indoor 12–18 October 1998	26	F	(United States) Venus Williams	(South Africa) Mariaan De Swardt (Ukraine) Elena Tatarkova	#16 #31	Win	5–7, 6–1, 6–3
1998	MGTS Kremlin Cup; Moscow, Russia; Tier I Carpet, indoor 19–25 October 1998	27	1R	(United States) Venus Williams	(Russia) Elena Likhovtseva (Japan) Ai Sugiyama	#17 #22	Win	3–6, 7–5, 7–6^{(7–4)}
1998	MGTS Kremlin Cup; Moscow, Russia; Tier I Carpet, indoor 19–25 October 1998	-	QF	(United States) Venus Williams	(Russia) Anna Kournikova (United States) Monica Seles	#13 #60	Withdrew	N/A

=== Mixed Doubles matches ===
Year	Tournament	Match	Round	Partner	Opponents	Rank	Result	Score
1998	Australian Open; Melbourne, Australia; Grand Slam; Hard, outdoor 19 January - 1 February 1998	1	1R	(Australia) Lleyton Hewitt	(Belarus) Natasha Zvereva (Australia) Andrew Florent	#2 #51	Loss	6–7^{(3–7)}, 2–6
1998	French Open; Paris, France; Grand Slam; Clay, outdoor 25 May - 7 June 1998	2	1R	(Argentina) Luis Lobo	(Czech Republic) Helena Vildová (Czech Republic) Pavel Vízner	#131 #40	Win	6–3, 6–2
1998	French Open; Paris, France; Grand Slam; Clay, outdoor 25 May - 7 June 1998	3	2R	(Argentina) Luis Lobo	(Soviet Union) Larisa Savchenko (India) Leander Paes	#4 #6	Win	7–6^{(7–4)}, 6–3
1998	French Open; Paris, France; Grand Slam; Clay, outdoor 25 May - 7 June 1998	4	3R	(Argentina) Luis Lobo	(United States) Ginger Helgeson-Nielsen (United States) Jim Grabb	#? #12	Win	6–4, 3–6, 6–0
1998	French Open; Paris, France; Grand Slam; Clay, outdoor 25 May - 7 June 1998	5	QF	(Argentina) Luis Lobo	(Netherlands) Kristie Boogert (United States) Donald Johnson	#76 #15	Win	6–3, 7–5
1998	French Open; Paris, France; Grand Slam; Clay, outdoor 25 May - 7 June 1998	6	SF	(Argentina) Luis Lobo	(Australia) Rachel McQuillan (Australia) David Macpherson	#74 #19	Win	6–1, 6–0
1998	French Open; Paris, France; Grand Slam; Clay, outdoor 25 May - 7 June 1998	7	F	(Argentina) Luis Lobo	(United States) Venus Williams (United States) Justin Gimelstob	#8 #91	Loss	4–6, 4–6
1998	Wimbledon Championships; London, Great Britain; Grand Slam; Grass, outdoor 23 June - 5 July 1998	8	1R	(Belarus) Max Mirnyi	(Romania) Cătălina Cristea (United States) Geoff Grant	#55 #99	Win	6–1, 7–6^{(11-9)}
1998	Wimbledon Championships; London, Great Britain; Grand Slam; Grass, outdoor 23 June - 5 July 1998	9	2R	(Belarus) Max Mirnyi	(United States) Lindsay Davenport (United States) Brian MacPhie	#1 #83	Win	4–6, 7–6^{(7–4)}, 6–2
1998	Wimbledon Championships; London, Great Britain; Grand Slam; Grass, outdoor 23 June - 5 July 1998	10	3R	(Belarus) Max Mirnyi	(France) Nathalie Tauziat (Canada) Daniel Nestor	#17 #18	Win	5–7, 6–3, 6–4
1998	Wimbledon Championships; London, Great Britain; Grand Slam; Grass, outdoor 23 June - 5 July 1998	11	QF	(Belarus) Max Mirnyi	(Australia) Kristine Kunce (Australia) Sandon Stolle	#49 #67	Win	7–5, 5–7, 6–4
1998	Wimbledon Championships; London, Great Britain; Grand Slam; Grass, outdoor 23 June - 5 July 1998	12	SF	(Belarus) Max Mirnyi	(Netherlands) Caroline Vis (Netherlands) Paul Haarhuis	#21 #2	Win	4–6, 6–4, 7–5
1998	Wimbledon Championships; London, Great Britain; Grand Slam; Grass, outdoor 23 June - 5 July 1998	13	F	(Belarus) Max Mirnyi	(Croatia) Mirjana Lučić (India) Mahesh Bhupathi	#192 #5	Win	6–4, 6–4
1998	US Open; New York City, United States; Grand Slam; Hard, outdoor 31 August - 13 September 1998	14	1R	(Belarus) Max Mirnyi	(Netherlands) Miriam Oremans (Sweden) Nicklas Kulti	#46 #29	Win	6–1, 6–3
1998	US Open; New York City, United States; Grand Slam; Hard, outdoor 31 August - 13 September 1998	-	2R	(Belarus) Max Mirnyi	(United States) Lindsay Davenport (United States) Jan-Michael Gambill	#5 #1,076	Walkover	N/A
1998	US Open; New York City, United States; Grand Slam; Hard, outdoor 31 August - 13 September 1998	15	QF	(Belarus) Max Mirnyi	(Croatia) Mirjana Lučić (India) Mahesh Bhupathi	#146 #7	Win	3–6, 7–5, 7–5
1998	US Open; New York City, United States; Grand Slam; Hard, outdoor 31 August - 13 September 1998	16	SF	(Belarus) Max Mirnyi	(United States) Debbie Graham (Australia) Sandon Stolle	#64 #47	Win	6–7^{(5–7)}, 7–6^{(7–3)}, 6–2
1998	US Open; New York City, United States; Grand Slam; Hard, outdoor 31 August - 13 September 1998	17	F	(Belarus) Max Mirnyi	(United States) Lisa Raymond (United States) Patrick Galbraith	#1 #14	Win	6–2, 6–2

== Tournament schedule ==
=== Singles schedule ===
Williams's 1995-1998 singles tournament schedule is as follows:

Date	Championship	Location	Category	Surface	Points	Outcome
30 October 1995– 5 November 1995	Bell Challenge	Quebec City (CAN)	WTA Tier III	Hard	1	First round Qualifying lost to Annie Miller, 1–6, 1–6
1995 Total year-end points					1	
3 March 1997– 16 March 1997	State Farm Evert Cup	Indian Wells (USA)	WTA Tier I	Hard	1	First round Qualifying lost to Alexia Dechaume-Balleret, 4–6, 0–6
4 August 1997– 10 August 1997	Acura Classic	Los Angeles (USA)	WTA Tier II	Hard	5	Third round Qualifying lost to Magui Serna, 6-7^{(6-8)}, 6-4, 3-6
13 October 1997– 19 October 1997	European Indoor Championships	Zurich (SUI)	WTA Tier I	Hard	3	Second round Qualifying lost to Dominique Monami, 2–6, 4–6
27 October 1997– 2 November 1997	Kremlin Cup	Moscow (RUS)	WTA Tier I	Carpet (i)	11	First round lost to Kimberly Po, 3-6, 6-7^{(6-8)}
3 November 1997– 9 November 1997	Ameritech Cup	Chicago (USA)	WTA Tier II	Hard	90	Semifinals lost to Lindsay Davenport, 4-6, 4-6
1997 Total year-end points					110	
12 January 1998– 18 January 1998	Adidas International	Sydney (AUS)	WTA Tier II	Hard	99	Semifinals lost to Arantxa Sánchez Vicario, 2-6, 1-6
19 January 1998– 1 February 1998	Australian Openl	Melbourne (AUS)	Grand Slam	Hard	26	Second Round lost to Venus Williams, 6-7^{(4-7)}, 1-6
23 February 1998– 1 March 1999	IGA Tennis Classic	Oklahoma City (USA)	WTA Tier III	Hard	35	Quarterfinals lost to Joannette Kruger, 1–6, 1–6
16 March 1998– 29 March 1998	Lipton Championships	Miami (USA)	WTA Tier I	Hard	65	Quarterfinals lost to Martina Hingis, 3-6, 6-1, 6-7^{(4-7)}
4 May 1998– 10 May 1998	Campionati Internazionali d’Italia	Rome (ITA)	WTA Tier I	Clay	65	Quarterfinals lost to Venus Williams, 4-6, 2-6
25 May– 7 June 1998	French Open	Paris (FRA)	Grand Slam	Clay	72	Fourth Round lost to Arantxa Sánchez Vicario, 6-4, 5-7, 3-6
15 June– 21 June 1998	Direct Line Insurance Championships	Eastbourne (GBR)	WTA Tier II	Grass	50	Quarterfinals lost to Arantxa Sánchez Vicario, 6-4, 4-6, 4-6
23 June– 5 July 1998	Wimbledon Championships	London (GBR)	Grand Slam	Grass	44	Third Round lost to Virginia Ruano Pascual, 5-7, 1-4 ret
10 August– 16 August 1998	Toshiba TennisClassic	Los Angeles (USA)	WTA Tier II	Hard	50	Quarterfinals lost to Martina Hingis, 4-6, 1-6
31 August 1998- 13 September 1998	US Open	New York City (USA)	Grand Slam	Grass	44	Third Round lost to Irina Spîrlea, 3-6, 6-0, 5-7
5 October– 11 October 1998	Porsche Tennis Grand Prix	Filderstadt (GER)	WTA Tier II	Hard	50	Quarterfinals lost to Sandrine Testud, 4-6, 6-1, 1-6
1998 Total year-end points					600	

=== Doubles schedule ===
Williams's 1997-1998 doubles tournament schedule is as follows:

Date	Championship	Location	Category	Partner	Surface	Points	Outcome
3 March 1997– 16 March 1997	State Farm Evert Cup	Indian Wells (USA)	WTA Tier I	(United States) Venus Williams	Hard	65	Quarterfinals lost to Davenport/Zvereva, 3–6, 0–6
31 August 1997– 13 September 1997	US Open	New York (USA)	Grand Slam	(United States) Venus Williams	Hard	2	First Round lost to Hetherington/Rinaldi Stunkel, 4–6, 5–7
3 November 1997– 9 November 1997	Ameritech Cup	Chicago (USA)	WTA Tier II	(United States) Venus Williams	Carpet (i)	90	Semifinals; Withdrew before match against Davenport/Seles
1997 Total year-end points						157	
19 January 1998- 1 February 1998	Australian Open	Melbourne (AUS)	Grand Slam	(United States) Venus Williams	Hard	72	Third Round lost to Kijimuta/Smith, 3-6, 3-6
23 February 1998- 1 March 1998	IGA Tennis Classic	Oklahoma City (USA)	WTA Tier III	(United States) Venus Williams	Hard (i)	90	Winner defeated Cristea/Kunce 7–5, 6–2
3 March 1998- 15 March 1998	State Farm Evert Cup	Indian Wells (USA)	WTA Tier I	(United States) Venus Williams	Hard	65	Quarterfinals lost to Hingis/Lučić 5-7, 6-4, 1-6
16 March 1998- 29 March 1998	Lipton Championships	Miami (USA)	WTA Tier I	(United States) Venus Williams	Hard	1	First Round lost to Callens/Hy-Boulais 4-6, 4-6
4 May 1998- 10 May 1998	Campionati Internazionali d’Italia	Rome (ITA)	WTA Tier I	(United States) Venus Williams	Clay	117	Semifinals lost to Ruano Pascual/Suárez 6-2, 4-6, 5-7
23 June 1998- 5 July 1998	Wimbledon Championships	London (GBR)	Grand Slam	(United States) Venus Williams	Grass	0	First round Withdrew before match against Kijimuta/Smith
5 October 1998- 11 October 1998	Porsche Tennis Grand Prix	Filderstadt (GER)	WTA Tier II	(United States) Venus Williams	Hard	1	First Round lost to Raymond/Stubbs 6-7^{(5-7)}, 1-6
12 October 1998- 18 October 1998	European Championships	Zurich (SUI)	WTA Tier I	(United States) Venus Williams	Hard	265	Winner defeated De Swardt/Tatarkova 5–7, 6–1, 6–3
19 October 1998- 25 October 1998	MGTS Kremlin Cup	Moscow (RUS)	WTA Tier I	(United States) Venus Williams	Carpet (i)	65	Quarterfinals; Withdrew before match against Kournikova/Seles
1998 Total year-end points						721	

=== Mixed Doubles schedule ===
Williams's 1998 doubles tournament schedule is as follows:

Date	Championship	Location	Category	Partner	Surface	Outcome
19 January 1998- 1 February 1998	Australian Open	Melbourne (AUS)	Grand Slam	(Australia) Lleyton Hewitt	Hard	First Round lost to Zvereva/Florent, 6-7^{(3-7)}, 2-6
25 May 1998- 7 June 1998	French Open	Paris (FRA)	Grand Slam	(Argentina) Luis Lobo	Clay	Final lost to V Williams/Gimelstob, 4-6, 4-6
23 June 1998- 5 July 1998	Wimbledon Championships	London (GBR)	Grand Slam	(Belarus) Max Mirnyi	Grass	Winner defeated Lučić/Bhupathi 6-4, 6-4
31 August 1998- 13 September 1998	US Open	New York (USA)	Grand Slam	(Belarus) Max Mirnyi	Hard	Winner defeated Raymond/Galbraith 6-2, 6-2

== Yearly records ==
=== Head-to-head matchups ===
==== 1995 ====
- (United States) Annie Miller 0-1

==== 1997 ====
- (United States) Amanda Basica 1-0
- (Thailand) Tamarine Tanasugarn 1-0
- (Italy) Gloria Pizzichini 1-0
- (Russia) Anastasia Myskina 1-0
- (Sweden) Åsa Svensson 1-0
- (Russia) Elena Likhovtseva 1-0
- (France) Mary Pierce 1-0
- (United States) Monica Seles 1-0
- (Spain) Magui Serna 1-1
- (United States) Kimberly Po 0-1
- (Belgium) Dominique Monami 0-1
- (United States) Lindsay Davenport 0-1
- (France) Alexia Dechaume-Balleret 0-1

==== 1998 ====
- (United States) Corina Morariu 2-0
- (Italy) Laura Golarsa 2-0
- (Croatia) Mirjana Lučić 2-0
- (United States) Corina Morariu 2-0
- (Italy) Gloria Pizzichini 1-0
- (United States) Lindsay Davenport 1-0
- (United States) Katrina Adams 1-0
- (Australia) Annabel Ellwood 1-0
- (Czech Republic) Denisa Chládková 1-0
- (Austria) Barbara Paulus 1-0
- (Switzerland) Patty Schnyder 1-0
- (France) Nathalie Tauziat 1-0
- (Spain) Conchita Martínez 1-0
- (Canada) Jana Nejedly 1-0
- (Belgium) Dominique Monami 1-0
- (Japan) Naoko Sawamatsu 1-0
- (Japan) Ai Sugiyama 1-0
- (Latvia) Larisa Neiland 1-0
- (Australia) Nicole Pratt 1-0
- (New Zealand) Pavlina Nola 1-0
- (Czech Republic) Květa Hrdličková 1-0
- (Czech Republic) Jana Novotná 1-0
- (Romania) Irina Spîrlea 2-1
- (France) Sandrine Testud 2-1
- (France) Sandrine Testud 1-1
- (South Africa) Joannette Kruger 1-1
- (Spain) Virginia Ruano Pascual 0-1
- (United States) Venus Williams 0-2
- (Switzerland) Martina Hingis 0-2
- (Spain) Arantxa Sánchez Vicario 0-3

=== Finals ===
==== Doubles: 2 (2–0) ====
Legend Tier I (1–0) Tier III (1–0)	Finals by Surface Hard (2–0)	Finals by Surface Outdoors (1–0) Indoors (1–0)

Outcome	No.	Date	Championship	Surface	Partner	Opponent	Score
Winner	1.	February 23, 1998	Oklahoma City, US (1)	Hard	(United States) Venus Williams	(Romania) Cătălina Cristea (Australia) Kristine Kunce	7–5, 6–2
Winner	2.	October 12, 1998	Zürich, Switzerland (1)	Carpet (i)	(United States) Venus Williams	(South Africa) Mariaan de Swardt (Ukraine) Elena Tatarkova	5–7, 6–1, 6–3

==== Mixed doubles: (2–1) ====
Legend Grand Slam (2–1)	Finals by Surface Hard (1–0) Grass (1–0) Clay (0-1)	Finals by Surface Outdoors (2–1)

Outcome	No.	Date	Championship	Surface	Partner	Opponent	Score
Runner-up	1.	May 25, 1998	French Open	Clay	(Argentina) Luis Lobo	(United States) Venus Williams (United States) Justin Gimelstob	4–6, 4–6
Winner	1.	June 23, 1998	Wimbledon	Grass	(Belarus) Max Mirnyi	(Croatia) Mirjana Lučić (India) Mahesh Bhupathi	6–4, 6–4
Winner	2.	August 31, 1998	US Open	Hard	(Belarus) Max Mirnyi	(United States) Lisa Raymond (United States) Patrick Galbraith	6–2, 6–2

== See also ==
- 1995 WTA Tour
- 1997 WTA Tour
- 1998 WTA Tour

Sporting positions
Preceded by Venus Williams; Angelique Kerber	World No. 1 First stint: July 8, 2002 – August 10, 2003; Last stint: April 24, 2017 – May 14, 2017	Succeeded by Kim Clijsters; Angelique Kerber
Preceded by Jennifer Capriati; Justine Henin; Petra Kvitová	Year-end World No. 1; 2002; 2008, 2009; 2012 – 2015	Succeeded by Justine Henin; Kim Clijsters; Angelique Kerber
Awards
Preceded by Jennifer Capriati; Jelena Janković; Petra Kvitová	ITF Women's Singles World Champion; 2002; 2009; 2012 – 2015	Succeeded by Justine Henin; Caroline Wozniacki; Angelique Kerber
Preceded by Martina Hingis & Anna Kournikova; Cara Black & Liezel Huber	WTA Doubles Team of the Year; 2000 (with Venus Williams); 2009 (with Venus Williams)	Succeeded by Lisa Raymond & Rennae Stubbs; Gisela Dulko & Flavia Pennetta
Preceded by Cara Black & Liezel Huber	ITF Women's Doubles World Champion; 2009 (with Venus Williams)	Succeeded by Gisela Dulko & Flavia Pennetta
