= 1997 Ameritech Cup – Doubles =

Doubles
- 1997 Ameritech Cup
- 1996 Champions: (United States) Lisa Raymond (Australia) Rennae Stubbs

Final
- Champions: (France) Alexandra Fusai (France) Nathalie Tauziat
- Runners-up: (United States) Lindsay Davenport (United States) Monica Seles
- Score: 6–3, 6–2

Details
- Draw: 16
- Seeds: 4

Events
Singles	Doubles
← 1996 ·	Ameritech Cup

Lisa Raymond and Rennae Stubbs were the defending champions but lost in the first round to Katrina Adams and Debbie Graham.

Alexandra Fusai and Nathalie Tauziat won in the final 6–3, 6–2 against Lindsay Davenport and Monica Seles.

== Seeds ==
Champion seeds are indicated in bold text while text in italics indicates the round in which those seeds were eliminated.

1. (Netherlands) Manon Bollegraf / (United States) Mary Joe Fernández (quarterfinals)
2. (Indonesia) Yayuk Basuki / (Netherlands) Caroline Vis (semifinals)
3. (United States) Lisa Raymond / (Australia) Rennae Stubbs (first round)
4. (France) **Alexandra Fusai** / (France) **Nathalie Tauziat (champions)**

== Draw ==
=== Key ===
- Q = Qualifier
- WC = Wild card
- LL = Lucky loser
- Alt = Alternate
- ITF = ITF entry
- PR = Protected ranking
- SR = Special ranking
- SE = Special exempt
- JE = Junior exempt
- JR = Junior Accelerator Programme entrant
- CO = College Accelerator Programme entrant
- NG = Next Gen Accelerator Program entrant
- w/o = Walkover
- r = Retired
- d = Defaulted

First round
1	(Netherlands) **M Bollegraf** (United States) **M J Fernández**	**6**	**6**
(Sweden) Å Carlsson (Belgium) L Courtois	3	2
(Romania) R Dragomir (Croatia) I Majoli	0	0
WC	(United States) **S Williams** (United States) **V Williams**	**6**	**6**
3	(United States) L Raymond (Australia) R Stubbs	3	4
(United States) **K Adams** (United States) **D Graham**	**6**	**6**
(United States) **L Davenport** (United States) **M Seles**	**6**	**6**
(Japan) A Sugiyama (Argentina) P Tarabini	1	2
(Russia) **E Likhovtseva** (Czech Republic) **H Suková**	5	**6**	**6**
(United States) L McNeil (Croatia) M Murić	**7**	2	4
Q	(Canada) M Drake (Canada) R Kolbovic	6	0
4	(France) **A Fusai** (France) **N Tauziat**	**7**	**6**
(South Africa) **M de Swardt** (United States) **M McGrath**	**6**	**6**
(United States) C Rubin (Netherlands) B Schultz-McCarthy	0	4
(Japan) N Kijimuta (Japan) N Miyagi	6	4
2	(Indonesia) **Y Basuki** (Netherlands) **C Vis**	**7**	**6**

Quarterfinals
1	(Netherlands) M Bollegraf (United States) M J Fernández	6	2
WC	(United States) **S Williams** (United States) **V Williams**	**7**	**6**
(United States) K Adams (United States) D Graham	2	1
(United States) **L Davenport** (United States) **M Seles**	**6**	**6**
(Russia) E Likhovtseva (Czech Republic) H Suková	1	6
4	(France) **A Fusai** (France) **N Tauziat**	**6**	**7**
(South Africa) M de Swardt (United States) M McGrath	4	4
2	(Indonesia) **Y Basuki** (Netherlands) **C Vis**	**6**	**6**

Semifinals
WC	(United States) S Williams (United States) V Williams
(United States) **L Davenport** (United States) **M Seles**	**w/o**
4	(France) **A Fusai** (France) **N Tauziat**	5	**6**	**6**
2	(Indonesia) Y Basuki (Netherlands) C Vis	**7**	1	4

Final
(United States) Lindsay Davenport (United States) Monica Seles	3	2
4	(France) **Alexandra Fusai** (France) **Nathalie Tauziat**	**6**	**6**
