= Magdalena Maleeva career statistics =

Career finals
Discipline	Type	Won	Lost	Total
Singles	Grand Slam	–	–	–
Singles	Summer Olympics	–	–	–
Singles	WTA Finals (Note: Formerly known as: Virginia Slims Championships (until 1995); WTA Tour Championships (until 2014))	–	–	–
Singles	WTA 1000 (Note: Formerly known as: Category 4 & 5 & 6 (until 1990); Tier I (until 2009); WTA Premier Mandatory and 5 (until 2021))	2	3	5
Singles	WTA 500 (Note: Formerly known as: Category 3 (until 1990); Tier II (until 2009); WTA Premier (until 2021))	2	4	6
Singles	WTA 250 (Note: Formerly known as: Category 1 & 2 (until 1990); Tier III & IV & V (until 2009); WTA International (until 2021))	6	4	10
Singles	Total	10	11	21
Doubles	Grand Slam	–	–	–
Doubles	Summer Olympics	–	–	–
Doubles	WTA Finals	–	–	–
Doubles	WTA 1000	1	1	–
Doubles	WTA 500	2	1	–
Doubles	WTA 250	2	3	–
Doubles	Total	5	5	10
Total		15	16	31

This is a list of the main career statistics of Bulgarian professional tennis player Magdalena Maleeva.

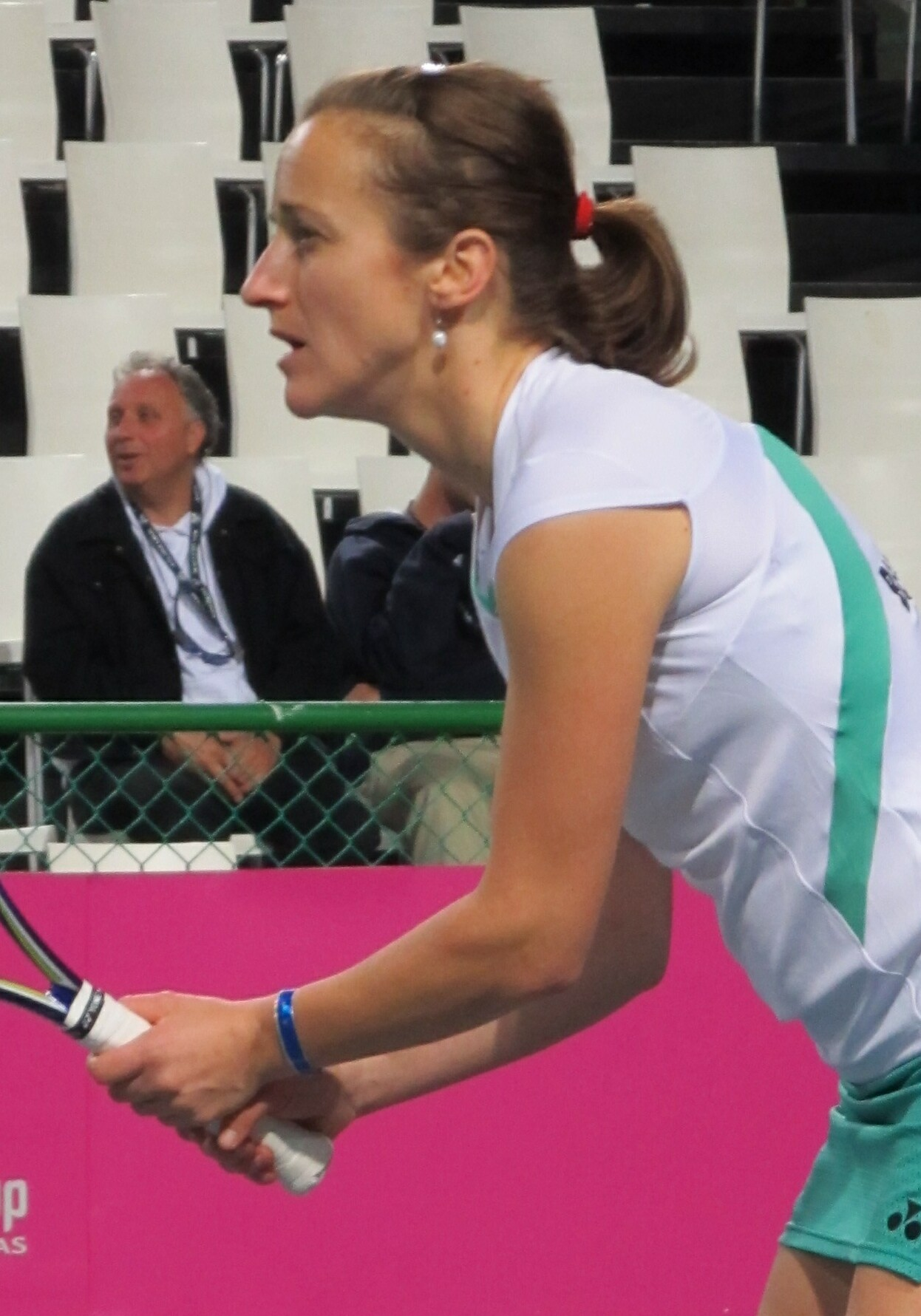
Maleeva at the 2011 Fed Cup.

== Performance timelines ==
Key
W	F	SF	QF	#R	RR	Q#	DNQ	A	NH

(W) winner; (F) finalist; (SF) semifinalist; (QF) quarterfinalist; (#R) rounds 4, 3, 2, 1; (RR) round-robin stage; (Q#) qualification round; (DNQ) did not qualify; (A) absent; (NH) not held; (SR) strike rate (events won / competed); (W–L) win–loss record.

=== Singles ===
Tournament	1989	1990	1991	1992	1993	1994	1995	1996	1997	1998	1999	2000	2001	2002	2003	2004	2005	SR	W-L	Win%
Grand Slam tournaments
Australian Open	A	Q2	4R	1R	4R	4R	1R	A	A	1R	A	1R	1R	4R	3R	2R	3R	0 / 12	17–12	59%
French Open	Q1	3R	1R	3R	4R	1R	2R	4R	1R	A	1R	3R	1R	1R	4R	4R	2R	0 / 15	20–15	66%
Wimbledon	A	2R	1R	1R	3R	2R	A	2R	3R	A	A	2R	4R	4R	2R	4R	4R	0 / 13	21–13	62%
US Open	Q1	1R	2R	QF	4R	4R	2R	1R	3R	A	A	2R	2R	3R	1R	2R	2R	0 / 14	20–14	59%
Win–loss	0–0	3–3	4–4	6–4	11–4	7–4	2–3	4–3	4–3	0–1	0–1	4–4	4–4	8–4	6–4	8–4	7–4	0 / 54	78–54	59%
Year-end championships
WTA Championships	Did not qualify				1R	A	1R	Did not qualify					1R	2R	Did not qualify			0 / 4	1–4	20%
National representation
Summer Olympics	Not Held			3R	Not Held			3R	Not Held			A	Not Held			2R	NH	0 / 3	5–3	63%
Fed Cup	A	A	2R	1R	2R	QF	1R	A	A	E/A I	A	A	A	E/A I	E/A I	A	PO	0 / 5	18–8	69%
Career statistics
Titles	0	0	0	1	0	2	3	0	0	0	1	0	1	1	1	0	0	Career total: 10		
Finals	0	0	1	1	1	2	6	1	0	0	1	1	3	2	1	1	0	Career total: 21		
Year-end ranking	216	73	38	20	16	11	6	19	36	115	89	22	16	14	30	25	52	$4,398,582		

=== Doubles ===
Tournament	1989	1990	1991	1992	1993	1994	1995	1996	1997	1998	1999	2000	2001	2002	2003	2004	2005	SR	W-L	Win%
Grand Slam tournaments
Australian Open	A	A	1R	3R	2R	A	1R	A	A	A	A	A	3R	2R	1R	3R	A	0 / 8	8–8	50%
French Open	A	A	1R	1R	3R	1R	A	A	A	A	A	A	2R	A	1R	1R	A	0 / 7	3–7	30%
Wimbledon	A	A	1R	1R	3R	1R	A	A	A	A	A	A	1R	A	3R	A	A	0 / 6	4–6	40%
US Open	A	1R	1R	1R	1R	2R	A	A	A	A	A	1R	1R	A	QF	A	2R	0 / 9	5–9	36%
Win–loss	0–0	0–1	0–4	2–4	5–4	1–3	0–1	0–0	0–0	0–0	0–0	0–1	3–4	1–1	5–4	2–2	1–1	0 / 30	20–30	40%
Career statistics
Titles	0	0	1	0	0	0	0	0	0	0	0	0	0	1	2	0	1	Career total: 5		
Finals	0	0	1	0	2	0	0	0	0	0	0	0	0	2	2	2	1	Career total: 10		
Year-end ranking	576	83	97	101	35	131	824	NR	363	892	340	129	92	54	14	51	92	$4,398,582		

== WTA Tour finals ==
=== Singles: 21 (10 titles, 11 runner-ups) ===
Legend WTA 1000 (Tier I) (2–3) WTA 500 (Tier II) (2–4) WTA 250 (Tier III / Tier IV / Tier V) (6–4)	Finals by surface Hard (1–3) Clay (2–4) Grass (1–0) Carpet (6–4)

Result	W–L	Date	Tournament	Tier	Surface	Opponent	Score
Loss	0–1	Apr 1991	Bol Open, Yugoslavia	Tier V	Clay	(Italy) Sandra Cecchini	4–6, 6–3, 5–7
Win	1–1	Jul 1992	San Marino Open	Tier V	Clay	(Italy) Federica Bonsignori	7–6^{(7–3)}, 6–4
Loss	1–2	Jan 1993	Hardcourt Championships, Australia	Tier III	Hard	(Spain) Conchita Martínez	3–6, 4–6
Win	2–2	Sep 1994	Moscow Open, Russia	Tier III	Carpet (i)	(Italy) Sandra Cecchini	7–5, 6–1
Win	3–2	Oct 1994	Zurich Open, Switzerland	Tier I	Carpet (i)	(Belarus) Natasha Zvereva	7–5, 3–6, 6–4
Win	4–2	Feb 1995	Chicago Cup, United States	Tier II	Carpet (i)	(United States) Lisa Raymond	7–5, 7–6^{(7–2)}
Loss	4–3	Apr 1995	Charleston Open, United States	Tier I	Clay	(Spain) Conchita Martínez	1–6, 1–6
Loss	4–4	May 1995	German Open	Tier I	Clay	(Spain) Arantxa Sánchez Vicario	4–6, 1–6
Win	5–4	Sep 1995	Moscow Open, Russia	Tier III	Carpet (i)	(Russia) Elena Makarova	6–4, 6–2
Loss	5–5	Oct 1995	Leipzig Cup, Germany	Tier II	Carpet (i)	(Germany) Anke Huber	w/o
Win	6–5	Nov 1995	Oakland Classic, United States	Tier II	Carpet (i)	(Japan) Ai Sugiyama	6–3, 6–4
Loss	6–6	May 1996	Madrid Open, Spain	Tier II	Clay	(Czech Republic) Jana Novotná	6–4, 4–6, 3–6
Win	7–6	Nov 1999	Pattaya Open, Thailand	Tier IV	Hard	(Luxembourg) Anne Kremer	4–6, 6–1, 6–2
Loss	7–7	Oct 2000	Luxembourg Open	Tier III	Carpet (i)	(United States) Jennifer Capriati	6–4, 1–6, 4–6
Loss	7–8	Feb 2001	Internationaux de Nice, France	Tier II	Hard (i)	(France) Amélie Mauresmo	2–6, 0–6
Win	8–8	Apr 2001	Hungarian Ladies Open	Tier V	Clay	(Luxembourg) Anne Kremer	3–6, 6–2, 6–4
Loss	8–9	Sep 2001	Leipzig Cup, Germany	Tier II	Carpet (i)	(Belgium) Kim Clijsters	1–6, 1–6
Win	9–9	Oct 2002	Kremlin Cup, Russia	Tier I	Carpet (i)	(United States) Lindsay Davenport	5–7, 6–3, 7–6^{(7–4)}
Loss	9–10	Oct 2002	Luxembourg Open	Tier III	Hard (i)	(Belgium) Kim Clijsters	1–6, 2–6
Win	10–10	Jun 2003	Birmingham Classic, UK	Tier III	Grass	(Japan) Shinobu Asagoe	6–1, 6–4
Loss	10–11	Feb 2004	Pan Pacific Open, Japan	Tier I	Carpet (i)	(United States) Lindsay Davenport	4–6, 1–6

=== Doubles: 10 (5 titles, 5 runner–ups) ===
Legend WTA 1000 (Tier I) (1–1) WTA 500 (Tier II) (2–1) WTA 250 (Tier III / Tier V) (2–3)	Finals by surface Hard (2–1) Clay (2–1) Grass (0–1) Carpet (1–2)

Result	W–L	Date	Tournament	Tier	Surface	Partner	Opponents	Score
Win	1–0	Apr 1991	Bol Open, Yugoslavia	Tier V	Clay	(Italy) Laura Golarsa	(Italy) Sandra Cecchini (Italy) Laura Garrone	Walkover
Loss	1–1	Feb 1993	Asian Open, Japan	Tier III	Carpet (i)	(Switzerland) Manuela Maleeva	(Czech Republic) Jana Novotná (Latvia) Larisa Neiland	1–6, 3–6
Loss	1–2	Apr 1993	Barcelona Open, Spain	Tier II	Clay	(Switzerland) Manuela Maleeva	(Spain) Conchita Martínez (Spain) Arantxa Sánchez Vicario	6–4, 1–6, 0–6
Win	2–2	Feb 2002	Antwerp Open, Belgium	Tier II	Carpet (i)	(Switzerland) Patty Schnyder	(France) Nathalie Dechy (United States) Meilen Tu	6–3, 6–7^{(3–7)}, 6–3
Loss	2–3	Jun 2002	Rosmalen Championships, Netherlands	Tier III	Grass	(Germany) Bianka Lamade	(Australia) Catherine Barclay (Germany) Martina Müller	4–6, 5–7
Win	3–3	Mar 2003	Miami Open, United States	Tier I	Hard	(South Africa) Liezel Huber	(Japan) Shinobu Asagoe (Japan) Nana Miyagi	6–4, 3–6, 7–5
Win	4–3	May 2003	Warsaw Open, Poland	Tier II	Clay	(South Africa) Liezel Huber	(Greece) Eleni Daniilidou (Italy) Francesca Schiavone	3–6, 6–4, 6–2
Loss	4–4	Jan 2004	Hard Court Championships, Australia	Tier III	Hard	(South Africa) Liezel Huber	(Russia) Svetlana Kuznetsova (Russia) Elena Likhovtseva	3–6, 4–6
Loss	4–5	Feb 2004	Pan Pacific Open, Japan	Tier I	Carpet (i)	(Russia) Elena Likhovtseva	(Zimbabwe) Cara Black (Australia) Rennae Stubbs	0–6, 1–6
Win	5–5	Jan 2005	Hard Court Championships, Australia	Tier III	Hard	(Russia) Elena Likhovtseva	(Italy) Maria Elena Camerin (Italy) Silvia Farina Elia	6–3, 5–7, 6–1

== ITF Circuit finals ==
=== Singles: 2 (1–1) ===
Legend $50,000 tournaments $10,000 tournaments	Finals by surface Hard (1–0) Clay (0–1)

Result	W–L	Date	Tournament	Tier	Surface	Opponent	Score
Loss	0–1	Apr 1989	ITF Bari, Italy	10,000	Clay	(Germany) Eva-Maria Schürhoff	6–2, 1–6, 6–7^{(5)}
Win	1–1	Dec 1999	ITF Cergy-Pontoise, France	50,000	Hard (i)	(Netherlands) Seda Noorlander	6–1, 6–4

=== Doubles: 1 (1–0) ===
Legend $25,000 tournaments	Finals by surface Carpet (1–0)

Result	W–L	Date	Tournament	Tier	Surface	Partner	Opponents	Score
Win	1–0	Mar 1990	ITF Moulins, France	25,000	Carpet (i)	(Czechoslovakia) Andrea Strnadová	(France) Valerie Ledroff (France) Pascale Paradis	3–6, 6–1, 6–1

== Junior Grand Slam tournament finals ==
=== Singles: 3 (3 titles) ===
Result	Year	Tournament	Surface	Opponent	Score
Win	1990	Australian Open	Hard	(Australia) Louise Stacey	7–5, 6–7^{(2)}, 6–1
Win	1990	French Open	Clay	(Soviet Union) Tatiana Ignatieva	6–2, 6–3
Win	1990	US Open	Hard	(France) Noëlle van Lottum	7–5, 6–2

== Billie Jean King Cup ==
=== Participations ===
Magdalena Maleeva debuted for the Bulgaria Fed Cup team in 1991. Since then, she has an 18–8 singles record and a 9–9 doubles record (27–17 overall).

==== Singles (18–8) ====
Edition	Round	Date	Against	Surface	Opponent	W/L	Result
1991	R1	22 July 1991	Hungary	Hard	Petra Schmitt	W	6–1, 6–2
1991	R2	24 July 1991	United States	Hard	Jennifer Capriati	L	5–7, 2–6
1992	R1	14 July 1992	Australia	Clay	Rachel McQuillan	W	7–6^{(4)}, 6–2
1992	PO	16 July 1992	Romania	Clay	Ruxandra Dragomir	W	6–0, 6–1
1993	R1	19 July 1993	South Korea	Clay	Park Sung-hee	W	6–0, 6–4
1993	R2	21 July 1993	Argentina	Clay	Florencia Labat	W	6–4, 5–7, 6–3
1994	R1	19 July 1994	Croatia	Clay	Iva Majoli	L	6–3, 4–6, 4–6
1994	R2	21 July 1994	Indonesia	Clay	Yayuk Basuki	W	6–3, 6–3
1994	WG QF	22 July 1994	France	Clay	Mary Pierce	W	6–7^{(6)}, 6–4, 6–4
1995	WG QF	22 April 1995	Spain	Carpet (I)	Conchita Martínez	L	2–6, 4–6
1995	WG QF	22 April 1995	Spain	Carpet (I)	Arantxa Sánchez Vicario	W	6–3, 6–3
1998	Z1 RR	14 April 1998	Romania	Clay	Raluca Sandu	L	1–6, 3–6
1998	Z1 RR	14 April 1998	South Africa	Clay	Mariaan de Swardt	L	1–6, 5–7
1998	Z1 RR	14 April 1998	Latvia	Clay	Elena Krutko	L	6–7^{(2)}, 6–1, 1–6
2002	Z1 RR	24 April 2002	Portugal	Clay	Angela Cardoso	W	6–0, 6–0
2002	Z1 RR	24 April 2002	Georgia	Clay	Salome Devidze	W	6–1, 6–3
2002	Z1 RR	24 April 2002	Estonia	Clay	Kaia Kanepi	W	6–4, 6–2
2002	Z1 PO	27 April 2002	Ukraine	Clay	Yuliya Beygelzimer	L	3–6, 4–6
2003	Z1 RR	21 April 2003	Georgia	Clay	Margalita Chakhnashvili	W	6–3, 6–1
2003	Z1 RR	21 April 2003	Serbia and Montenegro	Clay	Jelena Janković	W	6–2, 3–6, 6–2
2003	Z1 RR	21 April 2003	Israel	Clay	Anna Smashnova	W	7–5, 6–4
2005	Z1 RR	20 April 2005	South Africa	Clay	Natalie Grandin	W	6–4, 6–3
2005	Z1 RR	20 April 2005	Hungary	Clay	Zsófia Gubacsi	W	7–6^{(4)}, 6–2
2005	Z1 PO	23 April 2005	Netherlands	Clay	Michaëlla Krajicek	W	4–6, 6–3, 6–2
2005	PO2	9 July 2005	Japan	Hard (I)	Aiko Nakamura	W	3–6, 6–4, 6–3
2005	PO2	9 July 2005	Japan	Hard (I)	Akiko Morigami	L	6–7^{(3)}, 3–6

==== Doubles (9–9) ====
Edition	Round	Date	Against	Surface	Partner	Opponents	W/L	Result
1991	R1	22 July 1991	Hungary	Hard	Katerina Maleeva	(Hungary) Virág Csurgó (Hungary) Ágnes Muzamel	W	6–1, 6–2
1991	R2	24 July 1991	United States	Hard	Katerina Maleeva	(United States) Gigi Fernández (United States) Zina Garrison-Jackson	L	2–6, 1–6
1992	R1	14 July 1992	Australia	Hard	Katerina Maleeva	(Australia) Nicole Bradtke (Australia) Rennae Stubbs	L	2–6, 1–6
1992	PO	16 July 1992	Romania	Hard	Elena Pampoulova	(Romania) Ruxandra Dragomir (Romania) Irina Spîrlea	L	6–7^{(5)}, 2–6
1993	R2	21 July 1993	Argentina	Clay	Katerina Maleeva	(Argentina) Inés Gorrochategui (Argentina) Patricia Tarabini	L	7–5, 4–6, 2–6
1994	R1	19 July 1994	Croatia	Clay	Katerina Maleeva	(Croatia) Iva Majoli (Croatia) Maja Murić	W	6–2, 6–3
1994	WG QF	22 July 1994	France	Clay	Katerina Maleeva	(France) Julie Halard (France) Nathalie Tauziat	L	2–6, 6–3, 2–6
1995	WG QF	23 April 1995	Spain	Carpet (I)	Katerina Maleeva	(Spain) Neus Ávila Bonastre (Spain) Virginia Ruano Pascual	W	6–0, 6–1
2002	Z1 RR	24 April 2002	Portugal	Clay	Desislava Topalova	(Portugal) Angela Cardoso (Portugal) Ana Catarina Nogueira	W	6–2, 7–5
2002	Z1 PO	27 April 2002	Ukraine	Clay	Desislava Topalova	(Ukraine) Yuliya Beygelzimer (Ukraine) Alona Bondarenko	L	4–6, 0–6
2003	Z1 RR	21 April 2003	Georgia	Clay	Desislava Topalova	(Georgia (country)) Margalita Chakhnashvili (Georgia (country)) Tinatin Kavlashvili	W	6–1, 6–2
2003	Z1 RR	21 April 2003	Serbia and Montenegro	Clay	Desislava Topalova	(Serbia and Montenegro) Katarina Mišić (Serbia and Montenegro) Dragana Zarić	L	3–6, 6–3, 0–6
2003	Z1 RR	21 April 2003	Israel	Clay	Desislava Topalova	(Israel) Tzipora Obziler (Israel) Anna Smashnova	L	7–6^{(3)}, 3–6, 3–6
2005	Z1 RR	20 April 2005	South Africa	Clay	Sesil Karatantcheva	(South Africa) Lizaan du Plessis (South Africa) Alicia Pillay	W	6–3, 6–2
2005	Z1 RR	20 April 2005	Hungary	Clay	Sesil Karatantcheva	(Hungary) Virág Németh (Hungary) Ágnes Szávay	L	6–4, 3–6, 1–6
2011	Z1 RR	2 February 2011	Poland	Hard	Tsvetana Pironkova	(Poland) Klaudia Jans-Ignacik (Poland) Alicja Rosolska	W	6–1, 6–3
2011	Z1 RR	2 February 2011	Luxembourg	Hard	Tsvetana Pironkova	(Luxembourg) Anne Kremer (Luxembourg) Claudine Schaul	W	6–2, 7–5
2011	Z1 RR	2 February 2011	Israel	Hard	Dia Evtimova	(Israel) Valeria Patiuk (Israel) Keren Shlomo	W	6–3, 6–4
