= 1994 Virginia Slims of Chicago – Doubles =

Doubles
- 1994 Virginia Slims of Chicago
- 1993 Champions: (United States) Katrina Adams (United States) Zina Garrison-Jackson

Final
- Champions: (United States) Gigi Fernández (Belarus) Natasha Zvereva
- Runners-up: (Netherlands) Manon Bollegraf (United States) Martina Navratilova
- Score: 6–3, 3–6, 6–4

Events
Singles	Doubles
← 1993 ·	Virginia Slims of Chicago	· 1995 →

Katrina Adams and Zina Garrison-Jackson were the defending champions but lost in the semifinals to Gigi Fernández and Natasha Zvereva.

Fernández and Zvereva won in the final 6–3, 3–6, 6–4 against Manon Bollegraf and Martina Navratilova.

== Seeds ==
Champion seeds are indicated in bold text while text in italics indicates the round in which those seeds were eliminated.

1. (United States) **Gigi Fernández** / (Belarus) **Natasha Zvereva (champions)**
2. (United States) Lori McNeil / (Czech Republic) Helena Suková (semifinals)
3. (United States) Katrina Adams / (United States) Zina Garrison-Jackson (semifinals)
4. (Netherlands) Manon Bollegraf / (United States) Martina Navratilova (final)

== Draw ==
=== Key ===
- Q = Qualifier
- WC = Wild card
- LL = Lucky loser
- Alt = Alternate
- SE = Special exempt
- PR = Protected ranking
- ITF = ITF entry
- JE = Junior exempt
- w/o = Walkover
- r = Retired
- d = Defaulted
- SR = Special ranking

First round
1	(United States) **G Fernández** (Belarus) **N Zvereva**	**6**	**6**
WC	(Canada) S Jeyaseelan (United Kingdom) J Moore	1	1
(United States) A Grossman (New Zealand) J Richardson	2	**6**	4
(United States) **N Arendt** (United States) **S McCarthy**	**6**	4	**6**
3	(United States) **K Adams** (United States) **Z Garrison-Jackson**	**7**	**6**
(United States) L Harvey-Wild (United States) B Nagelsen	5	1
(United States) C MacGregor (United States) M Werdel	2	1
(South Africa) **R Fairbank-Nideffer** (Netherlands) **B Schultz**	**6**	**6**
(United States) **L Davenport** (Bulgaria) **M Maleeva**	**6**	**6**
(United States) A Frazier (United States) K Po	1	2
(Netherlands) I Driehuis (Mexico) L Novelo	2	2
4	(Netherlands) **M Bollegraf** (United States) **M Navratilova**	**6**	**6**
(Ukraine) E Brioukhovets (Croatia) M Murić	0	6
(Canada) **J Hetherington** (United States) **S Stafford**	**6**	**7**
(United States) M Jackson-Nobrega (United States) A Keller	0	5
2	(United States) **L McNeil** (Czech Republic) **H Suková**	**6**	**7**

Quarterfinals
1	(United States) **G Fernández** (Belarus) **N Zvereva**	**6**	**6**
(United States) N Arendt (United States) S McCarthy	2	2
3	(United States) **K Adams** (United States) **Z Garrison-Jackson**	**6**	**7**
(South Africa) R Fairbank-Nideffer (Netherlands) B Schultz	3	6
(United States) L Davenport (Bulgaria) M Maleeva	1	r
4	(Netherlands) **M Bollegraf** (United States) **M Navratilova**	**4**
(Canada) J Hetherington (United States) S Stafford	2	6
2	(United States) **L McNeil** (Czech Republic) **H Suková**	**6**	**7**

Semifinals
1	(United States) **G Fernández** (Belarus) **N Zvereva**	3	**7**	**6**
3	(United States) K Adams (United States) Z Garrison-Jackson	**6**	5	2
4	(Netherlands) **M Bollegraf** (United States) **M Navratilova**	**6**	**6**
2	(United States) L McNeil (Czech Republic) H Suková	1	3

Final
1	(United States) **Gigi Fernández** (Belarus) **Natasha Zvereva**	**6**	3	**6**
4	(Netherlands) Manon Bollegraf (United States) Martina Navratilova	3	**6**	4
