= 1990 Virginia Slims of Chicago – Singles =

Singles
- 1990 Virginia Slims of Chicago

Final
- Champion: (United States) Martina Navratilova
- Runner-up: (Switzerland) Manuela Maleeva
- Score: 6–3 6–2

Details
- Draw: 32 (3Q)
- Seeds: 8

Events
Singles	Doubles
- Virginia Slims of Chicago

Martina Navratilova defeated Manuela Maleeva in the final, 6–3, 6–2 to win the singles tennis title at the 1990 Virginia Slims of Chicago.

Zina Garrison was the defending champion, but lost in the semifinals to Maleeva.

== Seeds ==
1. (United States) Martina Navratilova (champion)
2. (United States) Zina Garrison-Jackson (semifinal)
3. (Spain) Arantxa Sánchez Vicario (first round)
4. (Socialist Federal Republic of Yugoslavia) Monica Seles (first round)
5. (Switzerland) Manuela Maleeva-Fragniere (final)
6. (Soviet Union) Natalia Zvereva (first round)
7. (Peru) Laura Gildemeister (second round)
8. (United States) Pam Shriver (quarterfinals)

== Draw ==
Key

- Q = Qualifier
- WC = Wild card
- LL = Lucky loser
- Alt = Alternate
- ITF = ITF entry
- PR = Protected ranking
- SR = Special ranking
- SE = Special exempt
- JE = Junior exempt
- JR = Junior Accelerator Programme entrant
- CO = College Accelerator Programme entrant
- NG = Next Gen Accelerator Program entrant
- w/o = Walkover
- r = Retired
- d = Defaulted

=== Finals ===
Semifinals
1	(United States) Martina Navratilova	6	6
8	(United States) Pam Shriver	4	3
5	(Switzerland) Manuela Maleeva-Fragniere	6	6
2	(United States) Zina Garrison-Jackson	2	0

Final
1	(United States) Martina Navratilova	6	6
5	(Switzerland) Manuela Maleeva-Fragniere	3	2

=== Top half ===
First round
1	(United States) M Navratilova	6	6
(Hungary) A Temesvári-Trunkos	1	3
Q	(United States) A Keller	6	6
(United States) A White	7	7
Q	(United States) T Whitlinger	3	6	6
(United States) H Na	6	3	1
(United States) K Rinaldi	7	3	6
6	(Soviet Union) N Zvereva	5	6	1
3	(Spain) A Sánchez Vicario	3	6
Q	(United States) L Harvey-Wild	6	7
(Australia) N Provis	1	6	7
(United States) A Grossman	6	1	6
(United States) S Sloane	7	7
(Italy) L Ferrando	5	6
(United States) A Henricksson	2	2
8	(United States) P Shriver	6	6

Second round
1	(United States) M Navratilova	6	6
(United States) A White	0	0
Q	(United States) T Whitlinger	0	6	6
(United States) K Rinaldi	6	4	3
Q	(United States) L Harvey-Wild	6	6
(Australia) N Provis	4	4
(United States) S Sloane	3	4
8	(United States) P Shriver	6	6

Quarterfinals
1	(United States) M Navratilova	6	6
Q	(United States) T Whitlinger	0	1
Q	(United States) L Harvey-Wild	1	2
8	(United States) P Shriver	6	6

Semifinals
1	(United States) Martina Navratilova	6	6
8	(United States) Pam Shriver	4	3

=== Bottom half ===
First round
5	(Switzerland) M Maleeva-Fragniere	6	6
LL	(United States) L Allen	3	3
(United States) A Smith	6	3	1
(United States) P Fendick	3	6	6
(Australia) A Minter	6	3	1
(West Germany) C Kohde-Kilsch	3	6	6
(South Africa) R Fairbank-Nideffer	6	6
4	(Socialist Federal Republic of Yugoslavia) M Seles	3	4
7	(Peru) L Gildemeister	6	6	6
(United States) G Rush	1	7	4
(France) N Tauziat	6	6
(West Germany) I Cueto	4	1
(United States) L McNeil	7	7
(United States) T Phelps	5	6
(France) M Pierce	4	4
2	(United States) Z Garrison-Jackson	6	6

Second round
5	(Switzerland) M Maleeva-Fragniere	6	7
(United States) P Fendick	4	5
(West Germany) C Kohde-Kilsch	3	6	3
(South Africa) R Fairbank-Nideffer	6	3	6
7	(Peru) L Gildemeister	1	7	5
(France) N Tauziat	6	6	7
(United States) L McNeil	3	2
2	(United States) Z Garrison-Jackson	6	6

Quarterfinals
5	(Switzerland) M Maleeva-Fragniere	6	6
(South Africa) R Fairbank-Nideffer	1	0
(France) N Tauziat	3	5
2	(United States) Z Garrison-Jackson	6	7

Semifinals
5	(Switzerland) Manuela Maleeva-Fragniere	6	6
2	(United States) Zina Garrison-Jackson	2	0
