= 1997 Ameritech Cup – Singles =

Singles
- 1997 Ameritech Cup
- 1996 Champion: (Czech Republic) Jana Novotná

Final
- Champion: (United States) Lindsay Davenport
- Runner-up: (France) Nathalie Tauziat
- Score: 6–0, 7–5

Details
- Draw: 30
- Seeds: 8

Events
| Singles | Doubles |
| ← 1996 · | Ameritech Cup |

Jana Novotná was the defending champion but lost in the quarterfinals to Nathalie Tauziat.

Lindsay Davenport won in the final 6–0, 7–5 against Tauziat.

== Seeds ==
A champion seed is indicated in bold text while text in italics indicates the round in which that seed was eliminated. The top four seeds received a bye to the second round.

1. (Czech Republic) Jana Novotná (quarterfinals)
2. (United States) Monica Seles (quarterfinals)
3. (United States) **Lindsay Davenport (champion)**
4. (Croatia) Iva Majoli (semifinals)
5. (France) Mary Pierce (second round)
6. (United States) Mary Joe Fernández (first round)
7. (Netherlands) Brenda Schultz-McCarthy (second round)
8. (United States) Lisa Raymond (quarterfinals)

== Draw ==
=== Key ===
- Q = Qualifier
- WC = Wild card
- LL = Lucky loser
- Alt = Alternate
- ITF = ITF entry
- PR = Protected ranking
- SR = Special ranking
- SE = Special exempt
- JE = Junior exempt
- JR = Junior Accelerator Programme entrant
- CO = College Accelerator Programme entrant
- NG = Next Gen Accelerator Program entrant
- w/o = Walkover
- r = Retired
- d = Defaulted

=== Final ===
| Final |
| | (France) Nathalie Tauziat | 0 | 5 |
| 3 | (United States) **Lindsay Davenport** | **6** | **7** |

=== Section 1 ===
First round
(United States) **A Frazier** | **6** | **6**
Q | (Canada) J Nejedly | 3 | 3
(Romania) R Dragomir | 3 | **7** | 2
(France) **N Tauziat** | **6** | 5 | **6**
(Belgium) **S Appelmans** | **6** | **6**
6 | (United States) M J Fernández | 2 | 1
PR | (Belgium) **L Courtois** | 5 | **7** | **6**
Q | (France) A Mauresmo | **7** | 6 | 4
WC | (United States) L Osterloh | 0 | 3
(Indonesia) **Y Basuki** | **6** | **6**
(United States) C Rubin | 4 | 5
7 | (Netherlands) **B Schultz-McCarthy** | **6** | **7**

Second round
1 | (Czech Republic) **J Novotná** | 5 | **6** | **6**
(United States) A Frazier | **7** | 2 | 3
(France) **N Tauziat** | **6** | **6**
(Belgium) S Appelmans | 1 | 2
4 | (Croatia) **I Majoli** | **7** | **6**
PR | (Belgium) L Courtois | 5 | 1
(Indonesia) **Y Basuki** | **6** | 4 | **6**
7 | (Netherlands) B Schultz-McCarthy | 2 | **6** | 4

Quarterfinals
1 | (Czech Republic) J Novotná | 5 | 3
(France) **N Tauziat** | **7** | **6**
4 | (Croatia) **I Majoli** | 4 | **7** | **6**
(Indonesia) Y Basuki | **6** | 5 | 4

Semifinals
(France) **N Tauziat** | **6** | **6**
4 | (Croatia) I Majoli | 2 | 3

=== Section 2 ===
First round
8 | (United States) **L Raymond** | **6** | **6**
(Czech Republic) H Suková | 2 | 2
(Japan) **A Sugiyama** | **6** | **6**
Q | (United States) T Snyder | 4 | 3
(Sweden) Å Carlsson | **7** | 3 | 3
(South Africa) **J Kruger** | 5 | **6** | **6**
5 | (France) **M Pierce** | **6** | **6**
Q | (Romania) C Cristea | 3 | 3
WC | (United States) **S Williams** | **6** | **7**
(Russia) E Likhovtseva | 3 | 5
(Poland) **M Grzybowska** | **6** | **7**
(United States) J Capriati | 3 | 5

Second round
8 | (United States) **L Raymond** | **6** | **6**
(Japan) A Sugiyama | 4 | 2
(South Africa) J Kruger | 2 | 4
3 | (United States) **L Davenport** | **6** | **6**
5 | (France) M Pierce | 3 | 6
WC | (United States) **S Williams** | **6** | **7**
(Poland) M Grzybowska | **6** | 3 | 2
2 | (United States) **M Seles** | 3 | **6** | **6**

Quarterfinals
8 | (United States) L Raymond | 4 | 4
3 | (United States) **L Davenport** | **6** | **6**
WC | (United States) **S Williams** | 4 | **6** | **6**
2 | (United States) M Seles | **6** | 1 | 1

Semifinals
3 | (United States) **L Davenport** | **6** | **6**
WC | (United States) S Williams | 4 | 4
