= 1995 Ameritech Cup – Singles =

Singles
- 1995 Ameritech Cup
- 1994 Champion: (Belarus) Natasha Zvereva

Final
- Champion: (Bulgaria) Magdalena Maleeva
- Runner-up: (United States) Lisa Raymond
- Score: 7–5, 7–6

Details
- Draw: 28
- Seeds: 8

Events
Singles	Doubles
← 1994 ·	Ameritech Cup	· 1996 →

Natasha Zvereva was the defending champion but lost in the second round to Lisa Raymond.

Magdalena Maleeva won in the final 7–5, 7–6 against Lisa Raymond.

== Seeds ==
A champion seed is indicated in bold text while text in italics indicates the round in which that seed was eliminated. The top four seeds received a bye to the second round.

1. (Belarus) Natasha Zvereva (second round)
2. (Argentina) Gabriela Sabatini (semifinals)
3. (Bulgaria) **Magdalena Maleeva (champion)**
4. (Netherlands) Brenda Schultz (quarterfinals)
5. (United States) Amy Frazier (quarterfinals)
6. (United States) Lori McNeil (second round)
7. (United States) Zina Garrison-Jackson (semifinals)
8. (United States) Chanda Rubin (quarterfinals)

== Draw ==
=== Key ===
- Q = Qualifier
- WC = Wild card
- LL = Lucky loser
- Alt = Alternate
- SE = Special exempt
- PR = Protected ranking
- ITF = ITF entry
- JE = Junior exempt
- w/o = Walkover
- r = Retired
- d = Defaulted
- SR = Special ranking

=== Final ===
Final
	(United States) Lisa Raymond	5	6
3	(Bulgaria) **Magdalena Maleeva**	**7**	**7**

=== Section 1 ===
First round
WC	(United States) C Kuhlman	3	1
(United States) **L Raymond**	**6**	**6**
WC	(Netherlands) Y Basting	4	4
(United States) **M Werdel**	**6**	**6**
(United States) T Whitlinger-Jones	**6**	4	4
5	(United States) **A Frazier**	3	**6**	**6**
(South Africa) E Reinach	2	3
(United States) **D Graham**	**6**	**6**
Q	(Venezuela) **M Vento**	1	**6**	**6**
(Austria) B Reinstadler	**6**	3	2
Q	(United States) A Keller	1	0
7	(United States) **Z Garrison-Jackson**	**6**	**6**

Second round
1	(Belarus) N Zvereva	6	6
(United States) **L Raymond**	**7**	**7**
(United States) M Werdel	3	4
5	(United States) **A Frazier**	**6**	**6**
4	(Netherlands) **B Schultz**	**6**	**7**
(United States) D Graham	4	6
Q	(Venezuela) M Vento	2	4
7	(United States) **Z Garrison-Jackson**	**6**	**6**

Quarterfinals
(United States) **L Raymond**	**6**	**6**
5	(United States) A Frazier	4	3
4	(Netherlands) B Schultz	**7**	3	6
7	(United States) **Z Garrison-Jackson**	6	**6**	**7**

Semifinals
(United States) **L Raymond**	5	**6**	**6**
7	(United States) Z Garrison-Jackson	**7**	4	3

=== Section 2 ===
First round
6	(United States) **L McNeil**	**6**	**6**
(South Africa) R Fairbank-Nideffer	2	2
Q	(Belgium) **L Courtois**	**6**	**6**
(United States) K Po	4	3
LL	(Canada) S Jeyaseelan	**7**	3	3
(Russia) **E Likhovtseva**	6	**6**	**6**
8	(United States) **C Rubin**	**6**	**6**
LL	(France) S Amiach	2	1
(United States) **P Shriver**	4	**7**	**6**
(United States) L Harvey-Wild	**6**	5	3
Q	(United States) K Adams	6	2
(Germany) **M Kochta**	**7**	**6**

Second round
6	(United States) L McNeil	6	0
Q	(Belgium) **L Courtois**	**7**	**6**
(Russia) E Likhovtseva
3	(Bulgaria) **M Maleeva**	**w/o**
8	(United States) **C Rubin**	**6**	**6**
(United States) P Shriver	4	1
(Germany) M Kochta	3	3
2	(Argentina) **G Sabatini**	**6**	**6**

Quarterfinals
Q	(Belgium) L Courtois	3	3
3	(Bulgaria) **M Maleeva**	**6**	**6**
8	(United States) C Rubin	6	4
2	(Argentina) **G Sabatini**	**7**	**6**

Semifinals
3	(Bulgaria) **M Maleeva**	**6**	4	**6**
2	(Argentina) G Sabatini	4	**6**	3
