= 1994 Virginia Slims of Chicago – Singles =

Singles
- 1994 Virginia Slims of Chicago
- 1993 Champion: (Federal Republic of Yugoslavia) Monica Seles

Final
- Champion: (Belarus) Natasha Zvereva
- Runner-up: (United States) Chanda Rubin
- Score: 6–3, 7–5

Events
Singles	Doubles
← 1993 ·	Virginia Slims of Chicago	· 1995 →

Monica Seles was the defending champion but did not compete that year.

Natasha Zvereva won in the final 6–3, 7–5 against Chanda Rubin.

== Seeds ==
A champion seed is indicated in bold text while text in italics indicates the round in which that seed was eliminated. The top four seeds received a bye to the second round.

1. (United States) Martina Navratilova (quarterfinals)
2. (United States) Lindsay Davenport (quarterfinals)
3. (Czech Republic) Helena Suková (second round)
4. (United States) Zina Garrison-Jackson (quarterfinals)
5. (Bulgaria) Magdalena Maleeva (semifinals)
6. (Belarus) **Natasha Zvereva (champion)**
7. (United States) Lori McNeil (semifinals)
8. (United States) Ann Grossman (first round)

== Draw ==
=== Key ===
- Q = Qualifier
- WC = Wild card
- LL = Lucky loser
- Alt = Alternate
- SE = Special exempt
- PR = Protected ranking
- ITF = ITF entry
- JE = Junior exempt
- w/o = Walkover
- r = Retired
- d = Defaulted
- SR = Special ranking

=== Final ===
Final
	(United States) Chanda Rubin	3	5
6	(Belarus) **Natasha Zvereva**	**6**	**7**

=== Section 1 ===
First round
Q	(United States) **A Keller**	**6**	**6**
Q	(United States) A Creek	1	1
LL	(France) S Amiach	4	2	r
(United States) **M Werdel**	**6**	**3**
(United States) T Whitlinger	2	**7**	2
5	(Bulgaria) **M Maleeva**	**6**	5	**6**
(United States) **S Cacic**	**6**	**6**
(Canada) H Kelesi	3	4
Q	(Ukraine) E Brioukhovets	4	4
(United States) **C Rubin**	**6**	**6**
(United States) **K Po**	**6**	**6**
8	(United States) A Grossman	1	4

Second round
1	(United States) **M Navratilova**	**6**	**6**
Q	(United States) A Keller	2	4
(United States) M Werdel	4	4
5	(Bulgaria) **M Maleeva**	**6**	**6**
3	(Czech Republic) H Suková	**6**	6	4
(United States) **S Cacic**	4	**7**	**6**
(United States) **C Rubin**	**6**	2	**6**
(United States) K Po	2	**6**	2

Quarterfinals
1	(United States) M Navratilova	4	3
5	(Bulgaria) **M Maleeva**	**6**	**6**
(United States) S Cacic	4	0
(United States) **C Rubin**	**6**	**6**

Semifinals
5	(Bulgaria) M Maleeva	6	0	r
(United States) **C Rubin**	**7**	**2**

=== Section 2 ===
First round
6	(Belarus) **N Zvereva**	**6**	**6**
(United States) S Stafford	3	2
(Netherlands) **B Schultz**	**6**	**6**
WC	(United States) J Steven	4	3
(United States) **G Fernández**	**6**	**7**
(Mexico) A Gavaldón	4	5
7	(United States) **L McNeil**	**7**	**7**
Q	(United States) N Arendt	5	5
(South Africa) R Fairbank-Nideffer	3	4
(United States) **L Harvey-Wild**	**6**	**6**
(United States) **A Frazier**	**6**	**6**
WC	(United States) A Miller	4	2

Second round
6	(Belarus) **N Zvereva**	**6**	3	**6**
(Netherlands) B Schultz	3	**6**	1
(United States) G Fernández	**7**	2	4
4	(United States) **Z Garrison-Jackson**	6	**6**	**6**
7	(United States) **L McNeil**	**6**	5	**6**
(United States) L Harvey-Wild	3	**7**	2
(United States) A Frazier	3	5
2	(United States) **L Davenport**	**6**	**7**

Quarterfinals
6	(Belarus) **N Zvereva**	**6**	**6**
4	(United States) Z Garrison-Jackson	2	3
7	(United States) **L McNeil**	**7**	**6**
2	(United States) L Davenport	6	2

Semifinals
6	(Belarus) **N Zvereva**	**6**	**7**
7	(United States) L McNeil	3	6
