= 1983 Virginia Slims of Chicago – Doubles =

Doubles
- 1983 Virginia Slims of Chicago
- 1982 Champions: (United States) Martina Navratilova (United States) Pam Shriver

Final
- Champions: (United States) Martina Navratilova (United States) Pam Shriver
- Runners-up: (United States) Kathy Jordan (United States) Anne Smith
- Score: 6–1, 6–2

Events
Singles	Doubles
← 1982 ·	Virginia Slims of Chicago	· 1984 →

Martina Navratilova and Pam Shriver were the defending champions and won in the final 6–1, 6–2 against Kathy Jordan and Anne Smith.

== Seeds ==
Champion seeds are indicated in bold text while text in italics indicates the round in which those seeds were eliminated.

1. (United States) **Martina Navratilova** / (United States) **Pam Shriver (champions)**
2. (United States) Kathy Jordan / (United States) Anne Smith (final)
3. (United States) Barbara Potter / (United States) Sharon Walsh (semifinals)
4. (United States) Rosemary Casals / (Australia) Wendy Turnbull (quarterfinals)

== Draw ==
=== Key ===
- Q = Qualifier
- WC = Wild card
- LL = Lucky loser
- Alt = Alternate
- SE = Special exempt
- PR = Protected ranking
- ITF = ITF entry
- JE = Junior exempt
- w/o = Walkover
- r = Retired
- d = Defaulted
- SR = Special ranking

First round
1	(United States) **M Navratilova** (United States) **P Shriver**	**6**	**6**
(United States) B Gadusek (United States) W White	3	1
(United States) B J King (South Africa) Y Vermaak	**6**	4	4
(Czechoslovakia) **H Suková** (France) **C Tanvier**	2	**6**	**6**
4	(United States) **R Casals** (Australia) **W Turnbull**	**7**	**7**
(United States) A Kiyomura (United States) P Smith	5	6
(West Germany) **C Kohde-Kilsch** (West Germany) **E Pfaff**	4	**6**	**6**
(South Africa) R Fairbank (Netherlands) M Mesker	**6**	3	4
(United States) **A Jaeger** (United States) **M L Piatek**	**6**	**6**
(Socialist Federal Republic of Yugoslavia) M Jaušovec (Hungary) A Temesvári	3	2
(United Kingdom) J Durie (United States) C Reynolds	4	4
3	(United States) **B Potter** (United States) **S Walsh**	**6**	**6**
(West Germany) **B Bunge** (United States) **A Leand**	**6**	4	**7**
(South Africa) I Kloss (United States) J Russell	0	**6**	6
(United States) L Allen (United Kingdom) A Hobbs	1	4
2	(United States) **K Jordan** (United States) **A Smith**	**6**	**6**

Quarterfinals
1	(United States) **M Navratilova** (United States) **P Shriver**	**6**	**6**
(Czechoslovakia) H Suková (France) C Tanvier	0	3
4	(United States) R Casals (Australia) W Turnbull	6	**6**	3
(West Germany) **C Kohde-Kilsch** (West Germany) **E Pfaff**	**7**	3	**6**
(United States) A Jaeger (United States) M L Piatek	5	6
3	(United States) **B Potter** (United States) **S Walsh**	**7**	**7**
(West Germany) B Bunge (United States) A Leand	1	**6**	1
2	(United States) **K Jordan** (United States) **A Smith**	**6**	3	**6**

Semifinals
1	(United States) **M Navratilova** (United States) **P Shriver**	**6**	**6**
(West Germany) C Kohde-Kilsch (West Germany) E Pfaff	4	1
3	(United States) B Potter (United States) S Walsh	3	4
2	(United States) **K Jordan** (United States) **A Smith**	**6**	**6**

Final
1	(United States) **Martina Navratilova** (United States) **Pam Shriver**	**6**	**6**
2	(United States) Kathy Jordan (United States) Anne Smith	1	2
