= 1990 Virginia Slims of Chicago =

- Date: February 12–18
- Edition: 19th
- Category: Tier I
- Draw: 32S / 16D
- Prize money: $500,000
- Surface: Carpet (Supreme) / indoor
- Location: Chicago, Illinois, U.S.
- Venue: UIC Pavilion

Champions

Singles
- (United States) Martina Navratilova

Doubles
- (United States) Martina Navratilova (United States) Anne Smith
| ← 1989 · | Virginia Slims of Chicago | · 1991 → |

The 1990 Virginia Slims of Chicago was a women's tennis tournament played on indoor carpet courts at the UIC Pavilion in Chicago, Illinois in the United States and was part of the Tier I category of the 1990 WTA Tour. It was the 19th edition of the tournament and was held from February 12 through February 18, 1990. First-seeded Martina Navratilova won the singles title, her 10th at the event and earned $100,000 first-prize money.

== Finals ==
=== Singles ===
(United States) Martina Navratilova defeated (Switzerland) Manuela Maleeva-Fragniere 6–3, 6–2

- It was Navratilova's 1st singles title of the year and the 147th of her career.

=== Doubles ===
(United States) Martina Navratilova / (United States) Anne Smith defeated (Spain) Arantxa Sánchez Vicario / (France) Nathalie Tauziat 6–7^{(9–11)}, 6–4, 6–3
