= 1983 Virginia Slims of Chicago – Singles =

Singles
- 1983 Virginia Slims of Chicago
- 1982 Champion: (United States) Martina Navratilova

Final
- Champion: (United States) Martina Navratilova
- Runner-up: (United States) Andrea Jaeger
- Score: 6–3, 6–2

Events
Singles	Doubles
← 1982 ·	Virginia Slims of Chicago	· 1984 →

Martina Navratilova was the defending champion and won in the final 6–3, 6–2 against Andrea Jaeger.

== Seeds ==
A champion seed is indicated in bold text while text in italics indicates the round in which that seed was eliminated.

1. (United States) **Martina Navratilova (champion)**
2. (United States) Andrea Jaeger (final)
3. (United States) Tracy Austin (semifinals)
4. (United States) Pam Shriver (semifinals)
5. (Socialist Federal Republic of Yugoslavia) Mima Jaušovec (first round)
6. (Australia) Wendy Turnbull (quarterfinals)
7. (West Germany) Sylvia Hanika (second round)
8. (West Germany) Bettina Bunge (quarterfinals)

== Draw ==
=== Key ===
- Q = Qualifier
- WC = Wild card
- LL = Lucky loser
- Alt = Alternate
- SE = Special exempt
- PR = Protected ranking
- ITF = ITF entry
- JE = Junior exempt
- w/o = Walkover
- r = Retired
- d = Defaulted
- SR = Special ranking

First round
1	(United States) **M Navratilova**	**6**	**6**
(United States) A Kiyomura	3	1
(Czechoslovakia) **I Budařová**	**6**	**6**
(Hungary) A Temesvári	3	2
(Netherlands) **M Mesker**	**6**	**6**
(Italy) S Simmonds	1	4
(United Kingdom) **J Durie**	**6**	**7**
5	(Socialist Federal Republic of Yugoslavia) M Jaušovec	4	5
4	(United States) **P Shriver**	**6**	**6**
(South Africa) Y Vermaak	3	0
(West Germany) **C Kohde-Kilsch**	**6**	1	**6**
(United States) J Russell	2	**6**	4
(South Africa) **R Fairbank**	**6**	**6**
(United States) A Leand	3	1
(United States) M L Piatek	6	4
8	(West Germany) **B Bunge**	**7**	**6**
6	(Australia) **W Turnbull**	**6**	**6**
(United States) L Allen	2	2
(United States) G Purdy	4	3
(United States) **C Reynolds**	**6**	**6**
(United States) **A Smith**	**6**	**6**
(United Kingdom) A Hobbs	4	3
(United States) W White	4	3
3	(United States) **T Austin**	**6**	**6**
7	(West Germany) **S Hanika**	**6**	**6**
(United States) K Jordan	4	2
(West Germany) **E Pfaff**	**6**	**6**
(United States) M Torres	3	0
(United States) B Gadusek	0	3
(Czechoslovakia) **H Suková**	**6**	**6**
(France) C Tanvier	0	1
2	(United States) **A Jaeger**	**6**	**6**

Second round
1	(United States) **M Navratilova**	**6**	**6**
(Czechoslovakia) I Budařová	1	1
(Netherlands) **M Mesker**	**6**	3	**6**
(United Kingdom) J Durie	4	**6**	1
4	(United States) **P Shriver**	**7**	**6**
(West Germany) C Kohde-Kilsch	6	3
(South Africa) R Fairbank	2	0
8	(West Germany) **B Bunge**	**6**	**6**
6	(Australia) **W Turnbull**	**6**	**3**
(United States) C Reynolds	2	2	r
(United States) A Smith	1	6
3	(United States) **T Austin**	**6**	**7**
7	(West Germany) S Hanika	**7**	4	3
(West Germany) **E Pfaff**	5	**6**	**6**
(Czechoslovakia) H Suková	1	2
2	(United States) **A Jaeger**	**6**	**6**

Quarterfinals
1	(United States) **M Navratilova**	**6**	**6**
(Netherlands) M Mesker	2	2
4	(United States) **P Shriver**	6	**6**	**6**
8	(West Germany) B Bunge	**7**	1	1
6	(Australia) W Turnbull	6	6
3	(United States) **T Austin**	**7**	**7**
(West Germany) E Pfaff	4	4
2	(United States) **A Jaeger**	**6**	**6**

Semifinals
1	(United States) **M Navratilova**	**6**	**6**
4	(United States) P Shriver	1	3
3	(United States) T Austin	3	0
2	(United States) **A Jaeger**	**6**	**6**

Final
1	(United States) **Martina Navratilova**	**6**	**6**
2	(United States) Andrea Jaeger	3	2
