= 1995 Ameritech Cup =

- Date: February 6–12
- Edition: 24th
- Category: Tier II
- Draw: 28S /16D
- Prize money: $430,000
- Surface: Carpet / indoor
- Location: Chicago, Illinois
- Venue: UIC Pavilion

Champions

Singles
- (Bulgaria) Magdalena Maleeva

Doubles
- (Argentina) Gabriela Sabatini / (Netherlands) Brenda Schultz
← 1994 ·	Ameritech Cup	· 1996 →

The 1995 Ameritech Cup was a women's tennis tournament played on indoor carpet courts at the UIC Pavilion in Chicago, Illinois in the United States that was part of Tier II of the 1995 WTA Tour. It was the 24th edition of the tournament and was held from February 6 through February 12, 1995. Third-seeded Magdalena Maleeva won the singles title and earned $79,000 first-prize money.

== Finals ==
=== Singles ===
(Bulgaria) Magdalena Maleeva defeated (United States) Lisa Raymond 7–5, 7–6

- It was Maleeva's 1st singles title of the year and the 4th of her career.

=== Doubles ===
(Argentina) Gabriela Sabatini / (Netherlands) Brenda Schultz defeated (United States) Marianne Werdel / (United States) Tami Whitlinger-Jones 5–7, 7–6, 6–4

- It was Sabatini's 2nd title of the year and the 38th of her career. It was Schultz's 1st title of the year and the 6th of her career.
