= 1991 Virginia Slims of Chicago =

- Date: February 11–17
- Edition: 20th
- Category: Tier II
- Draw: 28S / 14D
- Prize money: $350,000
- Surface: Carpet (Supreme) / indoor
- Location: Chicago, Illinois, U.S.
- Venue: UIC Pavilion

Champions

Singles
- (United States) Martina Navratilova

Doubles
- (United States) Gigi Fernández (Czechoslovakia) Jana Novotná
← 1990 ·	Virginia Slims of Chicago	· 1992 →

The 1991 Virginia Slims of Chicago was a women's tennis tournament played on indoor carpet courts at the UIC Pavilion in Chicago, Illinois in the United States and was part of the Tier II category of the 1991 WTA Tour. It was the 20th edition of the tournament and was held from February 11 through February 17, 1991. First-seeded Martina Navratilova won the singles title, her 11th at the event and earned $70,000 first-prize money as well as 300 ranking points.

== Finals ==
=== Singles ===
(United States) Martina Navratilova defeated (United States) Zina Garrison-Jackson 6–1, 6–2

- It was Navratilova's 1st singles title of the year and the 153rd of her career.

=== Doubles ===
(United States) Gigi Fernández / (Czechoslovakia) Jana Novotná defeated (United States) Martina Navratilova / (United States) Pam Shriver 6–2, 6–4
