= 1993 Virginia Slims of Chicago =

- Date: February 8–14
- Edition: 22nd
- Category: Tier II
- Draw: 28S / 16D
- Prize money: $375,000
- Surface: Carpet / indoors
- Location: Chicago, Illinois, U.S.
- Venue: UIC Pavilion

Champions

Singles
- (Federal Republic of Yugoslavia) Monica Seles

Doubles
- (United States) Katrina Adams / (United States) Zina Garrison-Jackson
| ← 1992 · | Virginia Slims of Chicago | · 1994 → |

The 1993 Virginia Slims of Chicago was a women's tennis tournament played on indoor carpet courts at the UIC Pavilion in Chicago in the United States that was part of Tier II of the 1993 WTA Tour. It was the 22nd edition of the tournament and was held from February 8 through February 14, 1993. First-seeded Monica Seles won the singles title and earned $75,000 first-prize money.

== Finals ==
=== Singles ===
(Federal Republic of Yugoslavia) Monica Seles defeated (United States) Martina Navratilova 3–6, 6–2, 6–1

- It was Seles' 2nd singles title of the year and the 32nd of her career.

=== Doubles ===
(United States) Katrina Adams / (United States) Zina Garrison-Jackson defeated (United States) Amy Frazier / (United States) Kimberly Po 7–6^{(9–7)}, 6–3

== Prize money ==
| Event | W | F | SF | QF | Round of 16 | Round of 32 |
| Singles | $75,000 | $33,750 | $16,875 | $9,000 | $4,750 | $2,525 |
| Doubles | $22,500 | $11,250 | $7,500 | $3,750 | $1,875 | – |
Doubles prize money per team
