= 1983 Virginia Slims of Chicago =

- Date: February 14–20
- Edition: 12th
- Draw: 32S / 16D
- Prize money: $150,000
- Surface: Carpet (Sporteze) / indoor
- Location: Chicago, IL, United States
- Venue: International Amphitheatre

Champions

Singles
- (United States) Martina Navratilova

Doubles
- (United States) Martina Navratilova / (United States) Pam Shriver
← 1982 ·	Virginia Slims of Chicago	· 1984 →

The 1983 Virginia Slims of Chicago was a women's tennis tournament played on indoor carpet courts at the International Amphitheatre in Chicago, Illinois in the United States that was part of the 1983 Virginia Slims World Championship Series. It was the 12th edition of the tournament and was held from February 14 through February 20, 1983. First-seeded Martina Navratilova won the singles title and earned $30,000 first-prize money.

== Finals ==
=== Singles ===
(United States) Martina Navratilova defeated (United States) Andrea Jaeger 6–3, 6–2

- It was Navratilova's 3rd singles title of the year and the 73rd of her career.

=== Doubles ===
(United States) Martina Navratilova / (United States) Pam Shriver defeated (United States) Kathy Jordan / (United States) Anne Smith 6–1, 6–2

- It was Navratilova's 6th title of the year and the 153rd of her career. It was Shriver's 3rd title of the year and the 37th of her career.

== Prize money ==
Event	W	F	SF	QF	Round of 16	Round of 32
Singles	$30,000	$15,000	$7,350	$3,600	$1,900	$1,100
