= 1996 Ameritech Cup =

- Date: October 28 – November 3
- Edition: 25th
- Category: Tier II
- Prize money: $450,000
- Surface: Carpet / indoor
- Location: Chicago, Illinois, U.S.
- Venue: UIC Pavilion

Champions

Singles
- (Czech Republic) Jana Novotná

Doubles
- (United States) Lisa Raymond / (Australia) Rennae Stubbs
← 1995 ·	Ameritech Cup	· 1997 →

The 1996 Ameritech Cup was a women's tennis tournament played on indoor carpet courts at the UIC Pavilion in Chicago, Illinois in the United States that was part of Tier II of the 1996 WTA Tour. It was the 25th edition of the tournament and was held from October 28 through November 3, 1996. Second-seeded Jana Novotná won the singles title.

== Finals ==
=== Singles ===
(Czech Republic) Jana Novotná defeated (United States) Jennifer Capriati 6–4, 3–6, 6–1

- It was Novotná's 9th title of the year and the 75th of her career.

=== Doubles ===
(United States) Lisa Raymond / (Australia) Rennae Stubbs defeated (United States) Angela Lettiere / (Japan) Nana Miyagi 6–1, 6–1

- It was Raymond's 3rd title of the year and the 6th of her career. It was Stubbs' 1st title of the year and the 10th of her career.
