= 1997 Ameritech Cup =

- Date: November 3–9
- Edition: 26th
- Category: Tier II
- Draw: 28S / 16D
- Prize money: $450,000
- Surface: Carpet / indoor
- Location: Chicago, Illinois, U.S.
- Venue: UIC Pavilion

Champions

Singles
- (United States) Lindsay Davenport

Doubles
- (France) Alexandra Fusai / (France) Nathalie Tauziat
← 1996 ·	Ameritech Cup

The 1997 Ameritech Cup was a women's tennis tournament played on indoor carpet courts at the UIC Pavilion in Chicago, Illinois in the United States and was part of the Tier II category of the 1997 WTA Tour. It was the 26th and last edition of the tournament and was held from November 3 through November 9, 1997. Third-seeded Lindsay Davenport won the singles title and earned $79,000 first-prize money.

== Finals ==
=== Singles ===
(United States) Lindsay Davenport defeated (France) Nathalie Tauziat 6–0, 7–5

- It was Davenport's 6th and last singles title of the year and the 13th of her career.

=== Doubles ===
(France) Alexandra Fusai / (France) Nathalie Tauziat defeated (United States) Lindsay Davenport / (United States) Monica Seles 6–3, 6–2

- It was Fusai's 3rd and last doubles title of the year and the 4th of her career. It was Tauziat's 2nd and last doubles title of the year and the 14th of her career.
