= 1992 Virginia Slims of Chicago =

- Date: February 10–16
- Edition: 21st
- Category: Tier II
- Draw: 28S / 14D
- Prize money: $350,000
- Surface: Carpet (Supreme) / indoor
- Location: Chicago, Illinois, U.S.
- Venue: UIC Pavilion

Champions

Singles
- (United States) Martina Navratilova

Doubles
- (United States) Martina Navratilova (United States) Pam Shriver
← 1991 ·	Virginia Slims of Chicago	· 1993 →

The 1992 Virginia Slims of Chicago was a women's tennis tournament played on indoor carpet courts at the UIC Pavilion in Chicago, Illinois in the United States and was part of the Tier II category of the 1992 WTA Tour. It was the 21st edition of the tournament and was held from February 10 through February 16, 1992. Second-seeded Martina Navratilova won the singles title, her 3rd consecutive at the event and 12th in total, earned $70,000 first-prize money as well as 300 ranking points.

== Finals ==
=== Singles ===
(United States) Martina Navratilova defeated (Czechoslovakia) Jana Novotná 7–6^{(7–4)}, 4–6, 7–5

- It was Navratilova's 1st singles title of the year and the 158th of her career.

=== Doubles ===
(United States) Martina Navratilova / (United States) Pam Shriver defeated (United States) Katrina Adams / (United States) Zina Garrison-Jackson 6–4, 7–6^{(9–7)}
