= 1994 Virginia Slims of Chicago =

- Date: February 7–13
- Edition: 23rd
- Category: Tier II
- Draw: 28S / 16D
- Prize money: $400,000
- Surface: Carpet (Supreme) / indoor
- Location: Chicago, Illinois, U.S.
- Venue: UIC Pavilion

Champions

Singles
- (Belarus) Natasha Zvereva

Doubles
- (United States) Gigi Fernández / (Belarus) Natasha Zvereva
← 1993 ·	Virginia Slims of Chicago	· 1995 →

The 1994 Virginia Slims of Chicago was a women's tennis tournament played on indoor carpet courts at the UIC Pavilion in Chicago, Illinois in the United States that was part of Tier II of the 1994 WTA Tour. It was the 23rd edition of the tournament and was held from February 7 through February 13, 1994. Second-seeded Natasha Zvereva won the singles title and earned $80,000 first-prize money.

== Finals ==
=== Singles ===
(Belarus) Natasha Zvereva defeated (United States) Chanda Rubin 6–3, 7–5

- It was Zvereva's 2nd title of the year and the 45th of her career.

=== Doubles ===
(United States) Gigi Fernández / (Belarus) Natasha Zvereva defeated (Netherlands) Manon Bollegraf / (United States) Martina Navratilova 6–3, 3–6, 6–4

- It was Fernández's 2nd title of the year and the 46th of her career. It was Zvereva's 3rd title of the year and the 46th of her career.

== Prize money ==
Event	W	F	SF	QF	Round of 16	Round of 32
Singles	$80,000	$36,000	$18,000	$9,600	$5,050	$2,650
Doubles *	$24,000	$12,000	$8,000	$4,000	$2,000	–

* per team
