= Ameritech Cup =

Defunct tennis tournament
- Event name: VS of Chicago (1971–78, 1983–94); Avon Championships of Chicago (1979–82); Ameritech Cup (1995–97)
- Tour: WTA Tour (1971–97)
- Founded: 1971
- Abolished: 1997
- Editions: 26
- Surface: Clay / outdoors (1971); Carpet (i) (1973–97)

The Ameritech Cup (known also as the Virginia Slims of Chicago and the Avon Championships of Chicago) is a defunct WTA Tour affiliated tennis tournament held every year from 1971 until 1997 in Chicago, Illinois in the United States. Its sponsors were Virginia Slims from 1971 to 1978 and again from 1983 to 1994, Avon from 1979 to 1982 and Ameritech from 1995 to 1997. The tournament was classified as Tier III in 1988-1989, Tier I in 1990 and Tier II until 1997, and was played on indoor carpet courts.

Martina Navratilova was the most successful player at the tournament, winning the singles competition 12 times and the doubles competition 7 times. Past champions also include former No. 1 players Chris Evert (1977), Monica Seles (1993) and Lindsay Davenport (1997).

== Past finals ==
=== Singles ===
Year	Champion	Runner-up	Score
1971	(France) Françoise Dürr	(United States) Billie Jean King	6–4, 6–2
1972	Not held		
1973	(Australia) Margaret Court	(United States) Billie Jean King	6–2, 4–6, 6–4
1974	(United Kingdom) Virginia Wade	(United States) Rosemary Casals	2–6, 6–4, 6–4
1975	(Australia) Margaret Court	(Czechoslovakia) Martina Navratilova	6–3, 3–6, 6–2
1976	(Australia) Evonne Goolagong Cawley	(United Kingdom) Virginia Wade	3–6, 6–3, 6–2
1977	(United States) Chris Evert	(Australia) Margaret Court	6–1, 6–3
1978	(United States) Martina Navratilova	(Australia) Evonne Goolagong Cawley	6–7^{(4–5)}, 6–2, 6–2
1979	(United States) Martina Navratilova	(United States) Tracy Austin	6–3, 6–4
1980	(United States) Martina Navratilova	(United States) Chris Evert-Lloyd	6–4, 6–4
1981	(United States) Martina Navratilova	(Czechoslovakia) Hana Mandlíková	6–4, 6–2
1982	(United States) Martina Navratilova	(Australia) Wendy Turnbull	6–4, 6–1
1983	(United States) Martina Navratilova	(United States) Andrea Jaeger	6–3, 6–2
1984	(United States) Pam Shriver	(United States) Barbara Potter	7–6, 2–6, 6–3
1985	(United States) Bonnie Gadusek	(United States) Kathy Rinaldi	6–1, 6–3
1986	(United States) Martina Navratilova	(Czechoslovakia) Hana Mandlíková	7–5, 7–5
1987	(United States) Martina Navratilova	(Soviet Union) Natasha Zvereva	6–1, 6–2
1988	(United States) Martina Navratilova	(United States) Chris Evert	6–2, 6–2
1989	(United States) Zina Garrison	(Soviet Union) Larisa Savchenko	6–3, 2–6, 6–4
1990	(United States) Martina Navratilova	(Switzerland) Manuela Maleeva-Fragnière	6–3, 6–2
1991	(United States) Martina Navratilova	(United States) Zina Garrison-Jackson	6–1, 6–2
1992	(United States) Martina Navratilova	(Czechoslovakia) Jana Novotná	7–6, 4–6, 7–5
1993	(Federal Republic of Yugoslavia) Monica Seles	(United States) Martina Navratilova	3–6, 6–2, 6–1
1994	(Belarus) Natasha Zvereva	(United States) Chanda Rubin	6–3, 7–5
1995	(Bulgaria) Magdalena Maleeva	(United States) Lisa Raymond	7–5, 7–6
1996	(Czech Republic) Jana Novotná	(United States) Jennifer Capriati	6–4, 3–6, 6–1
1997	(United States) Lindsay Davenport	(France) Nathalie Tauziat	6–0, 7–5

=== Doubles ===
Year	Champions	Runners-up	Score
1971	(Australia) Judy Dalton (France) Françoise Dürr	(United States) Rosemary Casals (United States) Billie Jean King	6–4, 7–6
1972	Not held		
1973	(United States) Rosemary Casals (United States) Billie Jean King	(Australia) Karen Krantzcke (Netherlands) Betty Stöve	6–4, 6–2
1974	(United States) Chris Evert (United States) Billie Jean King	(France) Françoise Dürr (Netherlands) Betty Stöve	3–6, 6–4, 6–4
1975	(United States) Chris Evert (Czechoslovakia) Martina Navratilova	(Australia) Margaret Court (Soviet Union) Olga Morozova	6–2, 7–6
1976	(Soviet Union) Olga Morozova (United Kingdom) Virginia Wade	(Australia) Evonne Goolagong Cawley (United States) Martina Navratilova	6–7^{(4–5)}, 6–4, 6–4
1977	(United States) Rosemary Casals (United States) Chris Evert	(Australia) Margaret Court (Netherlands) Betty Stöve	6–3, 6–4
1978	(Netherlands) Betty Stöve (Australia) Evonne Goolagong Cawley	(United States) Rosemary Casals (United States) JoAnne Russell	6–1, 6–4
1979	(United States) Rosemary Casals (United States) Betty Ann Grubb Stuart	(South Africa) Ilana Kloss (South Africa) Greer Stevens	3–6, 7–5, 7–5
1980	(United States) Billie Jean King (Czechoslovakia) Martina Navratilova	(West Germany) Sylvia Hanika (United States) Kathy Jordan	6–3, 6–4
1981	(Czechoslovakia) Martina Navratilova (United States) Pam Shriver	(United States) Barbara Potter (United States) Sharon Walsh	6–3, 6–1
1982	(United States) Martina Navratilova (United States) Pam Shriver	(United States) Rosemary Casals (Australia) Wendy Turnbull	7–5, 6–4
1983	(United States) Martina Navratilova (United States) Pam Shriver	(United States) Kathy Jordan (United States) Anne Smith	6–1, 6–2
1984	(United States) Billie Jean King (United States) Sharon Walsh	(United States) Barbara Potter (United States) Pam Shriver	5–7, 6–3, 6–3
1985	(United States) Kathy Jordan (Australia) Elizabeth Smylie	(United States) Elise Burgin (United States) JoAnne Russell	6–2, 6–2
1986	(West Germany) Claudia Kohde-Kilsch (Czechoslovakia) Helena Suková	(West Germany) Steffi Graf (Argentina) Gabriela Sabatini	6–7, 7–6, 6–3
1987	(West Germany) Claudia Kohde-Kilsch (Czechoslovakia) Helena Suková	(United States) Zina Garrison (United States) Lori McNeil	6–4, 6–3
1988	(United States) Lori McNeil (United States) Betsy Nagelsen	(Soviet Union) Larisa Savchenko (Soviet Union) Natasha Zvereva	6–4, 3–6, 6–4
1989	(Soviet Union) Larisa Savchenko (Soviet Union) Natasha Zvereva	(Czechoslovakia) Jana Novotná (Czechoslovakia) Helena Suková	6–3, 2–6, 6–3
1990	(United States) Martina Navratilova (United States) Anne Smith	(Spain) Arantxa Sánchez Vicario (France) Nathalie Tauziat	6–7, 6–4, 6–3
1991	(United States) Gigi Fernández (Czechoslovakia) Jana Novotná	(United States) Martina Navratilova (United States) Pam Shriver	6–2, 6–4
1992	(United States) Martina Navratilova (United States) Pam Shriver	(United States) Katrina Adams (United States) Zina Garrison-Jackson	6–4, 7–6
1993	(United States) Katrina Adams (United States) Zina Garrison-Jackson	(United States) Amy Frazier (United States) Kimberly Po	7–6^{(9–7)}, 6–3
1994	(United States) Gigi Fernández (Belarus) Natasha Zvereva	(Netherlands) Manon Bollegraf (United States) Martina Navratilova	6–3, 3–6, 6–4
1995	(Argentina) Gabriela Sabatini (Netherlands) Brenda Schultz	(United States) Marianne Werdel (United States) Tami Whitlinger-Jones	5–7, 7–6, 6–4
1996	(United States) Lisa Raymond (Australia) Rennae Stubbs	(United States) Angela Lettiere (Japan) Nana Miyagi	6–1, 6–1
1997	(France) Alexandra Fusai (France) Nathalie Tauziat	(United States) Lindsay Davenport (United States) Monica Seles	6–3, 6–2
