= 1988 Virginia Slims of Chicago =

- Date: November 7–13
- Edition: 17th
- Category: Category 4
- Draw: 28S / 16D
- Prize money: $250,000
- Surface: Carpet / indoor
- Location: Chicago, Illinois, U.S.
- Venue: UIC Pavilion

Champions

Singles
- (United States) Martina Navratilova

Doubles
- (United States) Lori McNeil / (United States) Betsy Nagelsen
← 1987 ·	Virginia Slims of Chicago	· 1989 →

The 1988 Virginia Slims of Chicago was a women's tennis tournament played on indoor carpet courts at the UIC Pavilion in Chicago, Illinois in the United States and was part of the Category 4 tier of the 1988 WTA Tour. It was the 17th edition of the tournament and was held from November 7 through November 13, 1988. First-seeded Martina Navratilova won the singles title, her third consecutive and ninth in total at the event, and earned $50,000 first-prize money.

== Finals ==
=== Singles ===
(United States) Martina Navratilova defeated (United States) Chris Evert 6–2, 6–2

- It was Navratilova's 9th singles title of the year and the 138th of her career.

=== Doubles ===
(United States) Lori McNeil / (United States) Betsy Nagelsen defeated (Soviet Union) Larisa Savchenko / (Soviet Union) Natasha Zvereva 6–4, 3–6, 6–4

- It was McNeil's 8th title of the year and the 18th of her career. It was Nagelsen's 2nd title of the year and the 18th of her career.

== See also ==
- Evert–Navratilova rivalry
