= 1987 Virginia Slims of Chicago – Singles =

Singles
- 1987 Virginia Slims of Chicago

Final
- Champion: (United States) Martina Navratilova
- Runner-up: (Soviet Union) Natasha Zvereva
- Score: 6–1, 6–2

Details
- Draw: 32 (4Q/4LL)
- Seeds: 8

Events
Singles	Doubles
← 1986 ·	Ameritech Cup	· 1988 →

Martina Navratilova successfully defended her title by defeating Natasha Zvereva 6–1, 6–2 in the final.

== Seeds ==
1. (United States) Martina Navratilova (champion)
2. (Czechoslovakia) Hana Mandlíková (second round)
3. (Czechoslovakia) Helena Suková (semifinals)
4. (United States) Zina Garrison (quarterfinals)
5. (West Germany) Claudia Kohde-Kilsch (second round)
6. (United States) Lori McNeil (quarterfinals)
7. (West Germany) Bettina Bunge (second round)
8. (Sweden) Catarina Lindqvist (first round)

== Draw ==
=== Key ===
- Q = Qualifier
- WC = Wild card
- LL = Lucky loser
- Alt = Alternate
- ITF = ITF entry
- PR = Protected ranking
- SR = Special ranking
- SE = Special exempt
- JE = Junior exempt
- JR = Junior Accelerator Programme entrant
- CO = College Accelerator Programme entrant
- NG = Next Gen Accelerator Program entrant
- w/o = Walkover
- r = Retired
- d = Defaulted

=== Finals ===
Semifinals
1	(United States) Martina Navratilova	7	7
3	(Czechoslovakia) Helena Suková	5	5
(United States) Barbara Potter	4	6	4
(Soviet Union) Natasha Zvereva	6	2	6

Final
1	(United States) Martina Navratilova	6	6
(Soviet Union) Natasha Zvereva	1	2

=== Top half ===
First round
1	(United States) M Navratilova	6	6
LL	(France) C Suire	0	1
LL	(United States) C Christian	1	1
(United States) MJ Fernández	6	6
LL	(Czechoslovakia) A Holíková	2	4
(Japan) E Inoue	6	6
(United States) B Bowes	4	2
6	(United States) L McNeil	6	6
3	(Czechoslovakia) H Suková	3	6	6
(Canada) H Kelesi	6	3	2
(Czechoslovakia) J Novotná	6	6
(South Africa) R Fairbank	1	4
(United States) E Hakami	1	0
Q	(Soviet Union) L Meskhi	6	6
(Soviet Union) L Savchenko	2	1
7	(West Germany) B Bunge	6	6

Second round
1	(United States) M Navratilova	6	6
(United States) MJ Fernández	4	3
(Japan) E Inoue	2	6	1
6	(United States) L McNeil	6	1	6
3	(Czechoslovakia) H Suková	3	6	6
(Czechoslovakia) J Novotná	6	3	2
Q	(Soviet Union) L Meskhi	6	6
7	(West Germany) B Bunge	4	2

Quarterfinals
1	(United States) M Navratilova	6	6
6	(United States) L McNeil	1	4
3	(Czechoslovakia) H Suková	7	0	6
Q	(Soviet Union) L Meskhi	6	6	0

Semifinals
1	(United States) M Navratilova	7	7
3	(Czechoslovakia) H Suková	5	5

=== Bottom half ===
First round
8	(Sweden) C Lindqvist	3	2
(United States) B Potter	6	6
Q	(United States) H Cioffi	2	5
(United States) K Adams	6	7
(United States) ML Daniels	6	6
Q	(Soviet Union) N Bykova	3	3
Q	(Poland) I Kuczyńska	5	2
4	(United States) Z Garrison	7	6
5	(West Germany) C Kohde-Kilsch	6	6
(United States) W White	2	0
(United States) B Nagelsen	3	2
(Soviet Union) N Zvereva	6	6
(United States) K Gompert	6	6
LL	(United States) P Casale	2	3
(West Germany) E Pfaff	3	2
2	(Czechoslovakia) H Mandlíková	6	6

Second round
(United States) B Potter	6	6
(United States) K Adams	2	4
(United States) ML Daniels	1	0
4	(United States) Z Garrison	6	6
5	(West Germany) C Kohde-Kilsch	4	2
(Soviet Union) N Zvereva	6	6
(United States) K Gompert	6	7
2	(Czechoslovakia) H Mandlíková	2	6

Quarterfinals
(United States) B Potter	6	6
4	(United States) Z Garrison	3	4
(Soviet Union) N Zvereva	5	6	6
(United States) K Gompert	7	4	0

Semifinals
(United States) B Potter	4	6	4
(Soviet Union) N Zvereva	6	2	6
