= 1987 Virginia Slims of Chicago – Doubles =

Doubles
- 1987 Virginia Slims of Chicago

Final
- Champions: (West Germany) Claudia Kohde-Kilsch (Czechoslovakia) Helena Suková
- Runners-up: (United States) Zina Garrison (United States) Lori McNeil
- Score: 6–4, 6–3

Details
- Draw: 16
- Seeds: 4

Events
Singles	Doubles
← 1986 ·	Ameritech Cup	· 1988 →

Claudia Kohde-Kilsch and Helena Suková successfully defended their title, by defeating Zina Garrison and Lori McNeil 6–4, 6–3 in the final.

== Seeds ==
1. (West Germany) Claudia Kohde-Kilsch / (Czechoslovakia) Helena Suková (champions)
2. (United States) Zina Garrison / (United States) Lori McNeil (final)
3. (United States) Betsy Nagelsen / (Australia) Wendy Turnbull (quarterfinals)
4. (Czechoslovakia) Hana Mandlíková / (Czechoslovakia) Jana Novotná (semifinals)

== Draw ==
=== Key ===
- Q = Qualifier
- WC = Wild card
- LL = Lucky loser
- Alt = Alternate
- ITF = ITF entry
- PR = Protected ranking
- SR = Special ranking
- SE = Special exempt
- JE = Junior exempt
- JR = Junior Accelerator Programme entrant
- CO = College Accelerator Programme entrant
- NG = Next Gen Accelerator Program entrant
- w/o = Walkover
- r = Retired
- d = Defaulted

=== Draw ===
First round
1	(West Germany) C Kohde-Kilsch (Czechoslovakia) H Suková	6	6
(United States) L Antonoplis (United States) B Gerken	2	1
(Soviet Union) L Savchenko (Soviet Union) N Zvereva	6	7
(United States) S Collins (United States) J Russell	3	5
4	(Czechoslovakia) H Mandlíková (Czechoslovakia) J Novotná	6	6
(United States) ML Daniels (United States) S Walsh-Pete	4	2
(United States) E Burgin (South Africa) R Fairbank	1	6	6
(United States) K Adams (United States) J Thomas	6	3	2
(West Germany) B Bunge (West Germany) E Pfaff	7	6
(France) C Suire (United States) W White	6	2
(Soviet Union) N Bykova (Italy) S Cecchini	2	4
3	(United States) B Nagelsen (Australia) W Turnbull	6	6
(Soviet Union) L Meskhi (Soviet Union) S Parkhomenko	6	6
(United States) Diane McKeon (South Africa) Y Vermaak	2	0
(United States) MJ Fernández (Sweden) C Lindqvist	2	0
2	(United States) Z Garrison (United States) L McNeil	6	6

Quarterfinals
1	(West Germany) C Kohde-Kilsch (Czechoslovakia) H Suková	6	6
(Soviet Union) L Savchenko (Soviet Union) N Zvereva	2	4
4	(Czechoslovakia) H Mandlíková (Czechoslovakia) J Novotná	7	4	6
(United States) E Burgin (South Africa) R Fairbank	6	6	3
(West Germany) B Bunge (West Germany) E Pfaff	3	6	6
3	(United States) B Nagelsen (Australia) W Turnbull	6	3	4
(Soviet Union) L Meskhi (Soviet Union) S Parkhomenko	4	0
2	(United States) Z Garrison (United States) L McNeil	6	6

Semifinals
1	(West Germany) C Kohde-Kilsch (Czechoslovakia) H Suková	6	7
4	(Czechoslovakia) H Mandlíková (Czechoslovakia) J Novotná	1	6
(West Germany) B Bunge (West Germany) E Pfaff	4	5
2	(United States) Z Garrison (United States) L McNeil	6	7

Final
1	(West Germany) C Kohde-Kilsch (Czechoslovakia) H Suková	6	6
2	(United States) Z Garrison (United States) L McNeil	4	3
