= 1994 Light n' Lively Doubles Championships =

- Date: March 24–27
- Edition: 20th
- Draw: 8D
- Prize money: $175,000
- Surface: Clay / outdoor
- Location: Wesley Chapel, Florida, U.S.
- Venue: Saddlebrook Golf & Tennis Resort
← 1993 ·	WTA Doubles Championships	· 1995 →

1994 Light n' Lively Doubles Championships
- 1994 Light 'n' Lively Doubles Championships
- 1993 Champions: (United States) Gigi Fernández (Belarus) Natasha Zvereva

Final
- Champions: (Czech Republic) Jana Novotná (Spain) Arantxa Sánchez Vicario
- Runners-up: (United States) Gigi Fernández (Belarus) Natasha Zvereva
- Score: 6–2, 7–5

Details
- Draw: 8D

Events
Doubles
← 1993 ·	Light 'n' Lively Doubles Championships	· 1995 →

The 1994 Light n' Lively Doubles Championships was a women's tennis tournament played on outdoor clay courts at the Saddlebrook Golf & Tennis Resort in Wesley Chapel, Florida in the United States that was part of the 1994 WTA Tour. It was the 20th edition of the tournament and was held from March 24 through March 27, 1994.

Gigi Fernández and Natasha Zvereva were the defending champions but lost in the final 6–2, 7–5 against Jana Novotná and Arantxa Sánchez Vicario. It was Novotná's 2nd title of the year and the 57th of her career. It was Sánchez Vicario's 2nd title of the year and the 40th of her career.

== Seeds ==
Champion seeds are indicated in bold text while text in italics indicates the round in which those seeds were eliminated.

1. (United States) Gigi Fernández / (Belarus) Natasha Zvereva (final)
2. (Czech Republic) **Jana Novotná** / (Spain) **Arantxa Sánchez Vicario (champions)**
3. (United States) Patty Fendick / (United States) Meredith McGrath (semifinals)
4. (Latvia) Larisa Neiland / (Australia) Elizabeth Smylie (quarterfinals)

== Draw ==
=== Key ===
- Q = Qualifier
- WC = Wild card
- LL = Lucky loser
- Alt = Alternate
- ITF = ITF entry
- PR = Protected ranking
- SR = Special ranking
- SE = Special exempt
- JE = Junior exempt
- JR = Junior Accelerator Programme entrant
- CO = College Accelerator Programme entrant
- NG = Next Gen Accelerator Program entrant
- w/o = Walkover
- r = Retired
- d = Defaulted

Quarterfinals
1	(United States) **Gigi Fernández** (Belarus) **Natasha Zvereva**	**6**	**6**
(United States) Mary Joe Fernández (United States) Kathy Rinaldi-Stunkel	0	0
3	(United States) **Patty Fendick** (United States) **Meredith McGrath**	4	**6**	**6**
(United States) Lori McNeil (Australia) Rennae Stubbs	**6**	1	4
WC	(United States) **Tracy Austin** (United States) **Pam Shriver**	**6**	**7**
4	(Latvia) Larisa Neiland (Australia) Elizabeth Smylie	3	5
(Canada) Jill Hetherington (United States) Shaun Stafford	2	3
2	(Czech Republic) **Jana Novotná** (Spain) **Arantxa Sánchez Vicario**	**6**	**6**

Semifinals
1	(United States) **Gigi Fernández** (Belarus) **Natasha Zvereva**	2	**6**	**6**
3	(United States) Patty Fendick (United States) Meredith McGrath	**6**	3	2
WC	(United States) Tracy Austin (United States) Pam Shriver	2	2
2	(Czech Republic) **Jana Novotná** (Spain) **Arantxa Sánchez Vicario**	**6**	**6**

Final
1	(United States) Gigi Fernández (Belarus) Natasha Zvereva	2	5
2	(Czech Republic) **Jana Novotná** (Spain) **Arantxa Sánchez Vicario**	**6**	**7**
