= 1997 World Doubles Cup =

- Date: 21–24 May
- Edition: 23rd
- Draw: 8D
- Prize money: $188,125
- Surface: Clay / outdoor
- Location: Edinburgh, Scotland
- Venue: Craiglockhart Tennis Centre
← 1996 ·	World Doubles Cup

1997 World Doubles Cup
- 1997 World Doubles Cup
- 1996 Champions: (United States) Nicole Arendt (Netherlands) Manon Bollegraf

Final
- Champions: (United States) Nicole Arendt (Netherlands) Manon Bollegraf
- Runners-up: (Australia) Rachel McQuillan (Japan) Nana Miyagi
- Score: 6–1, 3–6, 7–5

Details
- Draw: 8D

Events
Doubles
← 1996 ·	World Doubles Cup

The 1997 World Doubles Cup was a women's tennis tournament played on outdoor clay courts at the Craiglockhart Tennis Centre in Edinburgh in Scotland that was part of the 1997 WTA Tour. It was the 23rd and last edition of the tournament and was held from 21 May through 24 May 1997.

Top seeds and defending champion pairing Nicole Arendt and Manon Bollegraf won in the final 6–1, 3–6, 7–5 against Rachel McQuillan and Nana Miyagi. It was Arendt's 3rd title of the year and the 12th of her career. It was Bollegraf's 3rd title of the year and the 26th of her career.

== Seeds ==
Champion seeds are indicated in bold text while text in italics indicates the round in which those seeds were eliminated.

1. (United States) **Nicole Arendt** / (Netherlands) **Manon Bollegraf (champions)**
2. (United States) Lori McNeil / (Latvia) Larisa Savchenko (semifinals)
3. (United States) Gigi Fernández / (Argentina) Patricia Tarabini (quarterfinals)
4. (Indonesia) Yayuk Basuki / (Netherlands) Caroline Vis (quarterfinals)

== Draw ==
=== Key ===
- Q = Qualifier
- WC = Wild card
- LL = Lucky loser
- Alt = Alternate
- ITF = ITF entry
- PR = Protected ranking
- SR = Special ranking
- SE = Special exempt
- JE = Junior exempt
- JR = Junior Accelerator Programme entrant
- CO = College Accelerator Programme entrant
- NG = Next Gen Accelerator Program entrant
- w/o = Walkover
- r = Retired
- d = Defaulted

Quarterfinals
1	(United States) **Nicole Arendt** (Netherlands) **Manon Bollegraf**	**6**	**7**
(Ukraine) Olga Lugina (Germany) Elena Pampoulova	4	5
3	(United States) Gigi Fernández (Argentina) Patricia Tarabini	5	3
(Argentina) **Mercedes Paz** (United States) **Chanda Rubin**	**7**	**6**
(Australia) **Rachel McQuillan** (Japan) **Nana Miyagi**	**7**	1	**6**
4	(Indonesia) Yayuk Basuki (Netherlands) Caroline Vis	6	**6**	4
(United States) Debbie Graham (Australia) Kristine Kunce	4	4
2	(United States) **Lori McNeil** (Latvia) **Larisa Savchenko**	**6**	**6**

Semifinals
1	(United States) **Nicole Arendt** (Netherlands) **Manon Bollegraf**	**6**	**6**
(Argentina) Mercedes Paz (United States) Chanda Rubin	1	3
(Australia) **Rachel McQuillan** (Japan) **Nana Miyagi**	**6**	**6**
2	(United States) Lori McNeil (Latvia) Larisa Savchenko	1	4

Final
1	(United States) **Nicole Arendt** (Netherlands) **Manon Bollegraf**	**6**	3	**7**
(Australia) Rachel McQuillan (Japan) Nana Miyagi	1	**6**	5
