= 1980 Bridgestone Doubles Championships =

- Date: April 2–8
- Edition: 6th
- Draw: 8D
- Prize money: $150,000
- Surface: Carpet / indoor
- Location: Tokyo, Japan
- Venue: Yoyogi National Gymnasium

Champions

Doubles
- (United States) Billie Jean King / (United States) Martina Navratilova
← 1979 ·	WTA Doubles Championships	· 1981 →

The 1980 Bridgestone Doubles Championships was a women's tennis tournament played on indoor carpet courts at the Yoyogi National Gymnasium in Tokyo in Japan that was part of the Colgate Series of the 1980 WTA Tour. It was the sixth edition of the tournament and was held from April 2 through April 8, 1980.

== Final ==
=== Doubles ===
(United States) Billie Jean King / (United States) Martina Navratilova defeated (United Kingdom) Sue Barker / (United States) Ann Kiyomura 7–5, 6–3

- It was King's 8th doubles title of the year and the 128th of her career. It was Navratilova's 7th doubles title of the year and the 50th of her career.
