= 1989 Virginia Slims of Chicago – Doubles =

Doubles
- 1989 Virginia Slims of Chicago

Final
- Champions: (Soviet Union) Larisa Savchenko (Soviet Union) Natasha Zvereva
- Runners-up: (Czechoslovakia) Jana Novotná (Czechoslovakia) Helena Suková
- Score: 6–3, 2–6, 6–3

Details
- Draw: 16
- Seeds: 4

Events
Singles	Doubles
← 1988 ·	Ameritech Cup	· 1990 →

Lori McNeil and Betsy Nagelsen were the defending champions, but both players competed this year with different partners. McNeil teamed up with Hana Mandlíková and were forced to withdraw in the quarterfinals, while Nagelsen teamed up with Mary Joe Fernández and lost in the semifinals to Larisa Savchenko and Natasha Zvereva

Savchenko and Zvereva won the title by defeating Jana Novotná and Helena Suková 6–3, 2–6, 6–3 in the final.

== Seeds ==
1. (Czechoslovakia) Jana Novotná / (Czechoslovakia) Helena Suková (final)
2. (Soviet Union) Larisa Savchenko / (Soviet Union) Natasha Zvereva (champions)
3. (United States) Katrina Adams / (United States) Zina Garrison (quarterfinals)
4. (United States) Mary Joe Fernández / (United States) Betsy Nagelsen (semifinals)

== Draw ==
=== Key ===
- Q = Qualifier
- WC = Wild card
- LL = Lucky loser
- Alt = Alternate
- SE = Special exempt
- PR = Protected ranking
- ITF = ITF entry
- JE = Junior exempt
- w/o = Walkover
- r = Retired
- d = Defaulted
- SR = Special ranking

=== Draw ===
First round
1	(Czechoslovakia) J Novotná (Czechoslovakia) H Suková	6	4	6
(United States) E Burgin (South Africa) R Fairbank	3	6	2
(Poland) R Baranski (United States) D Faber	6	4	2
(Australia) H Mandlíková (United States) L McNeil	3	6	6
3	(United States) K Adams (United States) Z Garrison	6	6
(France) S Amiach (United States) C Reynolds	4	3
(United States) A Frazier (United States) M Werdel	3	0
(Netherlands) B Schultz (United States) P Shriver	6	6
(United States) A Henricksson (United States) A Smith	2	4
(West Germany) B Bunge (West Germany) E Pfaff	6	6
(United States) K Gompert (Peru) P Vásquez	3	1
4	(United States) MJ Fernández (United States) B Nagelsen	6	6
(United States) R Casals (United States) J Smoller	1	3
(Sweden) M Lindström (United States) H Ludloff	6	6
(United States) G Magers (United States) K Rinaldi	6^{3}	1
2	(Soviet Union) L Savchenko (Soviet Union) N Zvereva	7^{7}	6

Quarterfinals
1	(Czechoslovakia) J Novotná (Czechoslovakia) H Suková	w/o
(Australia) H Mandlíková (United States) L McNeil
3	(United States) K Adams (United States) Z Garrison	5	5
(Netherlands) B Schultz (United States) P Shriver	7	7
(West Germany) B Bunge (West Germany) E Pfaff	4	1
4	(United States) MJ Fernández (United States) B Nagelsen	6	6
(Sweden) M Lindström (United States) H Ludloff	6	5	3
2	(Soviet Union) L Savchenko (Soviet Union) N Zvereva	4	7	6

Semifinals
1	(Czechoslovakia) J Novotná (Czechoslovakia) H Suková	7	6
(Netherlands) B Schultz (United States) P Shriver	5	1
4	(United States) MJ Fernández (United States) B Nagelsen	2	2
2	(Soviet Union) L Savchenko (Soviet Union) N Zvereva	6	6

Final
1	(Czechoslovakia) J Novotná (Czechoslovakia) H Suková	3	6	3
2	(Soviet Union) L Savchenko (Soviet Union) N Zvereva	6	2	6
