= 1984 Bridgestone Doubles Championships =

- Date: March 5–11
- Edition: 10th
- Draw: 8D
- Prize money: $175,000
- Surface: Carpet / indoor
- Location: Tokyo & Yokohama, Japan

Champions

Doubles
- (United States) Ann Kiyomura / (United States) Pam Shriver
← 1983 ·	WTA Doubles Championships	· 1985 →

The 1984 Bridgestone Doubles Championships was a women's tennis tournament played on indoor carpet courts in Tokyo, Japan that was part of the 1984 Virginia Slims World Championship Series. It was the tenth edition of the tournament and was held from March 5 through March 11, 1984.

== Final ==
=== Doubles ===
(United States) Ann Kiyomura / (United States) Pam Shriver defeated (United States) Barbara Jordan / (Australia) Elizabeth Smylie, 6–3, 6–7, 6–3.

- It was Kiyomura's 1st title of the year and the 25th of her career. It was Shriver's 5th title of the year and the 53rd of her career.
