= 1983 Bridgestone Doubles Championships =

- Date: March 28 – April 3
- Edition: 9th
- Draw: 8D
- Prize money: $150,000
- Surface: Carpet / indoor
- Location: Tokyo, Japan
- Venue: Tokyo Metropolitan Gymnasium
← 1982 ·	WTA Doubles Championships	· 1984 →

1983 Bridgestone Doubles Championships
- 1983 Bridgestone Doubles Championships
- 1982 Champions: (United States) Martina Navratilova (United States) Pam Shriver

Final
- Champions: (United States) Billie Jean King (United States) Sharon Walsh
- Runners-up: (United States) Kathy Jordan (United States) Anne Smith
- Score: 6–1, 6–1

Details
- Draw: 8
- Seeds: 4

Events
Doubles
← 1982 ·	Bridgestone Doubles Championships	· 1984 →

The 1983 Bridgestone Doubles Championships was a women's tennis tournament played on indoor carpet courts at the Tokyo Metropolitan Gymnasium in Tokyo in Japan that was part of the 1983 Virginia Slims World Championship Series. It was the ninth edition of the tournament and was held from March 28 through April 3, 1983.

Martina Navratilova and Pam Shriver were the defending champions but did not compete that year. Billie Jean King and Sharon Walsh won in the final 6–1, 6–1 against Kathy Jordan and Anne Smith. It was King's 1st title of the year and the 167th of her career. It was Walsh's 2nd title of the year and the 13th of her career.

== Seeds ==
Champion seeds are indicated in bold text while text in italics indicates the round in which those seeds were eliminated.

1. (United States) Kathy Jordan / (United States) Anne Smith (final)
2. (United States) Rosemary Casals / (Australia) Wendy Turnbull (quarterfinals)
3. (United States) Ann Kiyomura / (United States) Paula Smith (semifinals)
4. (United States) Leslie Allen / (Socialist Federal Republic of Yugoslavia) Mima Jaušovec (semifinals)

== Draw ==
=== Key ===
- Q = Qualifier
- WC = Wild card
- LL = Lucky loser
- Alt = Alternate
- ITF = ITF entry
- PR = Protected ranking
- SR = Special ranking
- SE = Special exempt
- JE = Junior exempt
- JR = Junior Accelerator Programme entrant
- CO = College Accelerator Programme entrant
- NG = Next Gen Accelerator Program entrant
- w/o = Walkover
- r = Retired
- d = Defaulted

Quarterfinals
1	(United States) **Kathy Jordan** (United States) **Anne Smith**	**6**	**6**
(United States) Lea Antonoplis (United States) Barbara Jordan	4	2
3	(United States) **Ann Kiyomura** (United States) **Paula Smith**	**7**	**6**
(United Kingdom) Anne Hobbs (Australia) Susan Leo	6	2
(Brazil) Patricia Medrado (Brazil) Cláudia Monteiro	1	3
4	(United States) **Leslie Allen** (Socialist Federal Republic of Yugoslavia) **Mima Jaušovec**	**6**	**6**
(United States) **Billie Jean King** (United States) **Sharon Walsh**	3	**6**	**7**
2	(United States) Rosemary Casals (Australia) Wendy Turnbull	**6**	2	5

Semifinals
1	(United States) **Kathy Jordan** (United States) **Anne Smith**	2	**6**	**7**
3	(United States) Ann Kiyomura (United States) Paula Smith	**6**	4	6
4	(United States) Leslie Allen (Socialist Federal Republic of Yugoslavia) Mima Jaušovec	**7**	5	4
(United States) **Billie Jean King** (United States) **Sharon Walsh**	6	**7**	**6**

Final
1	(United States) Kathy Jordan (United States) Anne Smith	1	1
(United States) **Billie Jean King** (United States) **Sharon Walsh**	**6**	**6**
