= 1988 Virginia Slims of Chicago – Singles =

Singles
- 1988 Virginia Slims of Chicago
- 1987 Champion: (United States) Martina Navratilova

Final
- Champion: (United States) Martina Navratilova
- Runner-up: (United States) Chris Evert
- Score: 6–2, 6–2

Details
- Seeds: 8

Events
| Singles | Doubles |
| ← 1987 · | Virginia Slims of Chicago | · 1989 → |

Two-time defending champion Martina Navratilova defeated Chris Evert in the final, 6–2, 6–2 to win the singles tennis title at the 1988 Virginia Slims of Chicago. This was the 80th and the last time these two legends faced each other in a professional match, with Navratilova ending their rivalry 43–37 in her favour.

== Seeds ==
A champion seed is indicated in bold text while text in italics indicates the round in which that seed was eliminated. The top four seeds received a bye to the second round.

1. (United States) **Martina Navratilova (champion)**
2. (United States) Chris Evert (final)
3. (Argentina) Gabriela Sabatini (quarterfinals)
4. (Bulgaria) Manuela Maleeva (semifinals)
5. (Czechoslovakia) Helena Suková (semifinals)
6. (Soviet Union) Natasha Zvereva (second round)
7. (United States) Zina Garrison (quarterfinals)
8. (West Germany) Claudia Kohde-Kilsch (first round)

== Draw ==
=== Key ===
- Q = Qualifier
- WC = Wild card
- LL = Lucky loser
- Alt = Alternate
- SE = Special exempt
- PR = Protected ranking
- ITF = ITF entry
- JE = Junior exempt
- w/o = Walkover
- r = Retired
- d = Defaulted
- SR = Special ranking

=== Final ===
| Final |
| 1 | (United States) **Martina Navratilova** | **6** | **6** |
| 2 | (United States) Chris Evert | 2 | 2 |

=== Section 1 ===
First round
(Canada) H Kelesi | 4 | **6** | 6
Q | (United States) **A Frazier** | **6** | 4 | **7**
LL | (United States) H Ludloff | 6 | 4
(United States) **P Louie-Harper** | **7** | **6**
(United States) H Cioffi | 3 | 3
7 | (United States) **Z Garrison** | **6** | **6**
(United States) **K Rinaldi** | **6** | **6**
(United States) G Fernández | 2 | 3
(United States) L Allen | 3 | **6** | 2
(United States) **W White** | **6** | 4 | **6**
Q | (United States) C Cunningham | 2 | 1
5 | (Czechoslovakia) **H Suková** | **6** | **6**

Second round
1 | (United States) **M Navratilova** | **6** | **6**
Q | (United States) A Frazier | 0 | 3
(United States) P Louie-Harper | 3 | 2
7 | (United States) **Z Garrison** | **6** | **6**
3 | (Argentina) **G Sabatini** | **6** | **6**
(United States) K Rinaldi | 0 | 2
(United States) W White | 4 | 4
5 | (Czechoslovakia) **H Suková** | **6** | **6**

Quarterfinals
1 | (United States) **M Navratilova** | **6** | **6**
7 | (United States) Z Garrison | 3 | 3
3 | (Argentina) G Sabatini | 3 | **6** | 2
5 | (Czechoslovakia) **H Suková** | **6** | 2 | **6**

Semifinals
1 | (United States) **M Navratilova** | **6** | **6**
5 | (Czechoslovakia) H Suková | 4 | 3

=== Section 2 ===
First round
6 | (Soviet Union) **N Zvereva** | **6** | **6**
(Mexico) A Gavaldón | 1 | 0
(United States) **A Grossman** | **6** | **6**
Q | (United States) M L Daniels | 4 | 3
(United States) **A Smith** | **6** | **6**
Q | (United States) S Stafford | 3 | 4
8 | (West Germany) C Kohde-Kilsch | 4 | 1
(United States) **L McNeil** | **6** | **6**
(South Africa) **R Fairbank** | 2 | **7** | **6**
(Australia) W Turnbull | **6** | 6 | 2
(Soviet Union) L Savchenko | **6** | 4 | 6
(United States) **S Rehe** | 3 | **6** | **7**

Second round
6 | (Soviet Union) N Zvereva | 3 | 3
(United States) **A Grossman** | **6** | **6**
(United States) A Smith | 6 | 2
4 | (Bulgaria) **M Maleeva** | **7** | **6**
(United States) L McNeil | **7** | 3 | 2
(South Africa) **R Fairbank** | 5 | **6** | **6**
(United States) S Rehe
2 | (United States) **C Evert** | **w/o**

Quarterfinals
(United States) A Grossman | 2 | 1
4 | (Bulgaria) **M Maleeva** | **6** | **6**
(South Africa) R Fairbank | 0 | 2
2 | (United States) **C Evert** | **6** | **6**

Semifinals
4 | (Bulgaria) M Maleeva | 4 | **6** | 2
2 | (United States) **C Evert** | **6** | 2 | **6**

== See also ==
- Evert–Navratilova rivalry
