= 1979 Bridgestone Doubles Championships =

- Date: April 2–8
- Edition: 5th
- Draw: 8D
- Prize money: $150,000
- Surface: Carpet / indoor
- Location: Tokyo, Japan
- Venue: Yoyogi National Gymnasium

Champions

Doubles
- (France) Françoise Dürr / (Netherlands) Betty Stöve
← 1978 ·	WTA Doubles Championships	· 1980 →

The 1979 Bridgestone Doubles Championships was a women's tennis tournament played on indoor carpet courts at the Yoyogi National Gymnasium in Tokyo in Japan that was part of the Colgate Series of the 1979 WTA Tour. It was the fifth edition of the tournament and was held from April 2 through April 8, 1979.

For the first time since its inception, the Doubles Championships was played separately from the WTA Finals which took place two weeks earlier in the United States, although by strange coincidence the doubles final that year featured the same two pairings, the same outcome and almost the same scoreline (7–6, 7–6).

== Final ==
=== Doubles ===
(France) Françoise Dürr / (Netherlands) Betty Stöve defeated (United Kingdom) Sue Barker / (United States) Ann Kiyomura 7–5, 7–6^{(9–7)}
