= 1981 Bridgestone Doubles Championships =

- Date: May 4–10
- Edition: 7th
- Draw: 8D
- Prize money: $150,000
- Surface: Carpet / indoor
- Location: Tokyo, Japan
- Venue: Tokyo Metropolitan Gymnasium

Champions

Doubles
- (United Kingdom) Sue Barker / (United States) Ann Kiyomura
← 1980 ·	WTA Doubles Championships	· 1982 →

The 1981 Bridgestone Doubles Championships was a women's tennis tournament played on indoor carpet courts at the Tokyo Metropolitan Gymnasium in Tokyo in Japan that was part of the Toyota Series of the 1981 WTA Tour. It was the seventh edition of the tournament and was held from May 4 through May 10, 1981.

== Final ==
=== Doubles ===
(United Kingdom) Sue Barker / (United States) Ann Kiyomura defeated (United States) Barbara Potter / (United States) Sharon Walsh 7–5, 6–2

- It was Barker's 3rd doubles title of the year and the 9th of her career. It was Kiyomura's 2nd doubles title of the year and the 20th of her career.
