= 1989 Virginia Slims of Chicago – Singles =

Singles
- 1989 Virginia Slims of Chicago

Final
- Champion: (United States) Zina Garrison
- Runner-up: (Soviet Union) Larisa Savchenko
- Score: 6–3, 2–6, 6–4

Details
- Draw: 28
- Seeds: 8

Events
Singles	Doubles
← 1988 ·	Ameritech Cup	· 1990 →

Martina Navratilova was the three-time defending champion, but was forced to withdraw in her quarterfinal match against Larisa Savchenko.

Zina Garrison won the title by defeating Savchenko 6–3, 2–6, 6–4 in the final.

== Seeds ==
The top four seeds received a bye to the second round.

1. (United States) Martina Navratilova (quarterfinals, withdrew)
2. (United States) Zina Garrison (champion)
3. (Czechoslovakia) Helena Suková (semifinals)
4. (Bulgaria) Manuela Maleeva (semifinals)
5. (Czechoslovakia) Jana Novotná (first round)
6. (United States) Mary Joe Fernández (first round)
7. (United States) Pam Shriver (quarterfinals)
8. (Soviet Union) Natasha Zvereva (first round)

== Draw ==
=== Key ===
- Q = Qualifier
- WC = Wild card
- LL = Lucky loser
- Alt = Alternate
- SE = Special exempt
- PR = Protected ranking
- ITF = ITF entry
- JE = Junior exempt
- w/o = Walkover
- r = Retired
- d = Defaulted
- SR = Special ranking

=== Finals ===
Semifinals
(Soviet Union) Larisa Savchenko	7	6
3	(Czechoslovakia) Helena Suková	5	4
4	(Bulgaria) Manuela Maleeva	3	6	1
2	(United States) Zina Garrison	6	4	6

Final
(Soviet Union) Larisa Savchenko	3	6	4
2	(United States) Zina Garrison	6	2	6

=== Top half ===
First round
(United States) K Adams	6^{6}	4
(United States) D Faber	7^{8}	6
(Soviet Union) L Savchenko	4	7	6
(Netherlands) B Schultz	6	5	2
(West Germany) B Bunge	6	6^{4}	6
5	(Czechoslovakia) J Novotná	2	7^{7}	0
(United States) L Poruri	6^{4}	4
(South Africa) R Fairbank	7^{7}	6
(United States) J Smoller	2	4
(United States) A Henricksson	6	6
(United States) M Werdel	6	6
8	(Soviet Union) N Zvereva	2	3

Second round
1	(United States) M Navratilova	6	6
(United States) D Faber	4	2
(Soviet Union) L Savchenko	6	6
(West Germany) B Bunge	4	4
3	(Czechoslovakia) H Suková	6	7^{7}
(South Africa) R Fairbank	3	6^{2}
(United States) A Henricksson	6	6^{4}	6
(United States) M Werdel	4	7^{7}	3

Quarterfinals
1	(United States) M Navratilova
(Soviet Union) L Savchenko	w/o
3	(Czechoslovakia) H Suková	6	6
(United States) A Henricksson	4	4

Semifinals
(Soviet Union) L Savchenko	7	6
3	(Czechoslovakia) H Suková	5	4

=== Bottom half ===
First round
6	(United States) MJ Fernández	3	5
(United States) G Magers	6	7
(United States) K Rinaldi	3	7	7^{8}
(United States) A Frazier	6	5	6^{6}
(Poland) R Baranski	6^{1}	1
(United States) L McNeil	7^{7}	6
7	(United States) P Shriver	6	6
(France) S Amiach	1	0
(United States) A Smith	6	6
(West Germany) E Pfaff	3	3
(Peru) P Vásquez	6	6
(United States) K Gompert	3	2

Second round
(United States) G Magers	4	7^{7}	2
(United States) K Rinaldi	6	6^{4}	0^{r}
(United States) L McNeil	2	2
4	(Bulgaria) M Maleeva	6	6
7	(United States) P Shriver	6	6
(United States) A Smith	4	2
(Peru) P Vásquez	2	0
2	(United States) Z Garrison	6	6

Quarterfinals
(United States) G Magers	1	1
4	(Bulgaria) M Maleeva	6	6
7	(United States) P Shriver	3	0
2	(United States) Z Garrison	6	6

Semifinals
4	(Bulgaria) M Maleeva	3	6	1
2	(United States) Z Garrison	6	4	6
