= 1992 Light n' Lively Doubles Championships =

- Date: March 26–29
- Edition: 18th
- Draw: 8D
- Prize money: $175,000
- Surface: Clay / outdoor
- Location: Wesley Chapel, Florida, U.S.
- Venue: Saddlebrook Golf & Tennis Resort
← 1991 ·	WTA Doubles Championships	· 1993 →

1992 Light n' Lively Doubles Championships
- 1992 Light n' Lively Doubles Championships
- 1991 Champions: (United States) Gigi Fernández (Czechoslovakia) Helena Suková

Final
- Champions: (Czechoslovakia) Jana Novotná (Latvia) Larisa Savchenko-Neiland
- Runners-up: (Spain) Arantxa Sánchez Vicario (Commonwealth of Independent States) Natasha Zvereva
- Score: 6–4, 6–2

Details
- Draw: 8
- Seeds: 4

Events
Doubles
← 1991 ·	WTA Doubles Championships	· 1993 →

The 1992 Light n' Lively Doubles Championships was a women's doubles tennis tournament played on outdoor clay courts at the Saddlebrook Golf & Tennis Resort in Wesley Chapel, Florida in the United States that was part of the 1992 WTA Tour. It was the 18th edition of the tournament and was held from March 26 through March 29, 1992.

Gigi Fernández and Helena Suková were the defending champions, but Suková did not qualify for this edition. Fernández teamed up with Jennifer Capriati and lost in the semifinals to Jana Novotná and Larisa Savchenko-Neiland. Novotná and Savchenko-Neiland won the title by defeating Arantxa Sánchez Vicario and Natasha Zvereva 6–4, 6–2 in the final. The result ended Sánchez Vicario's 21-match streak in doubles, which made her win four consecutive titles at Sydney, the Australian Open, Tokyo and Key Biscayne. It was Novotná's 1st doubles title of the year and the 33rd of her career. It was Savchenko-Neiland's 3rd doubles title of the year and the 32nd of her career.

== Seeds ==
1. (Czechoslovakia) Jana Novotná / (Latvia) Larisa Savchenko-Neiland (champions)
2. (Spain) Arantxa Sánchez Vicario / (Commonwealth of Independent States) Natasha Zvereva (final)
3. (United States) Katrina Adams / (Netherlands) Manon Bollegraf (quarterfinals)
4. (United States) Sandy Collins / (South Africa) Elna Reinach (quarterfinals)

== Draw ==
=== Key ===
- Q = Qualifier
- WC = Wild card
- LL = Lucky loser
- Alt = Alternate
- ITF = ITF entry
- PR = Protected ranking
- SR = Special ranking
- SE = Special exempt
- JE = Junior exempt
- JR = Junior Accelerator Programme entrant
- CO = College Accelerator Programme entrant
- NG = Next Gen Accelerator Program entrant
- w/o = Walkover
- r = Retired
- d = Defaulted

=== Draw ===
Quarterfinals
1	(Czechoslovakia) Jana Novotná (Latvia) Larisa Savchenko-Neiland	6	6
(Commonwealth of Independent States) Leila Meskhi (Argentina) Mercedes Paz	3	1
3	(United States) Katrina Adams (Netherlands) Manon Bollegraf	2	5
(United States) Jennifer Capriati (United States) Gigi Fernández	6	7
(United States) Gretchen Magers (United States) Robin White	6	6
4	(United States) Sandy Collins (South Africa) Elna Reinach	1	4
(Canada) Jill Hetherington (United States) Kathy Rinaldi	3	2
2	(Spain) Arantxa Sánchez Vicario (Commonwealth of Independent States) Natasha Zvereva	6	6

Semifinals
1	(Czechoslovakia) Jana Novotná (Latvia) Larisa Savchenko-Neiland	6	7
(United States) Jennifer Capriati (United States) Gigi Fernández	2	5
(United States) Gretchen Magers (United States) Robin White	6	2	3
2	(Spain) Arantxa Sánchez Vicario (Commonwealth of Independent States) Natasha Zvereva	2	6	6

Final
1	(Czechoslovakia) Jana Novotná (Latvia) Larisa Savchenko-Neiland	6	6
2	(Spain) Arantxa Sánchez Vicario (Commonwealth of Independent States) Natasha Zvereva	4	2
