= 1988 Virginia Slims Championships – Doubles =

Doubles
- 1988 Virginia Slims Championships

Final
- Champions: (United States) Martina Navratilova (United States) Pam Shriver
- Runners-up: (Soviet Union) Larisa Savchenko (Soviet Union) Natasha Zvereva
- Score: 6–3, 6–4

Details
- Draw: 8
- Seeds: 4

Events
Singles	Doubles
← 1987 ·	Virginia Slims Championships	· 1989 →

Two-time defending champions Martina Navratilova and Pam Shriver defeated Larisa Savchenko and Natasha Zvereva in the final, 6–3, 6–4 to win the doubles tennis title at the 1988 Virginia Slims Championships. It was Navratilova's eleventh Tour Finals doubles title, and Shriver's eighth.

== Seeds ==
Champion seeds are indicated in bold text while text in italics indicates the round in which those seeds were eliminated. The top two seeded teams received byes into the semifinals.

1. (United States) **Martina Navratilova** / (United States) **Pam Shriver (champions)**
2. (West Germany) Claudia Kohde-Kilsch / (Czechoslovakia) Helena Suková (semifinals)
3. (West Germany) Steffi Graf / (Argentina) Gabriela Sabatini (semifinals)
4. (United States) Gigi Fernández / (United States) Robin White (quarterfinals)

== Draw ==
=== Key ===
- Q = Qualifier
- WC = Wild card
- LL = Lucky loser
- Alt = Alternate
- SE = Special exempt
- PR = Protected ranking
- ITF = ITF entry
- JE = Junior exempt
- w/o = Walkover
- r = Retired
- d = Defaulted
- SR = Special ranking

Quarterfinals

Semifinals

Final

1
- (United States) **Martina Navratilova**
- (United States) **Pam Shriver**
**6**
**6**

- (United States) Lori McNeil
- (United States) Betsy Nagelsen
3
1

1
- (United States) **Martina Navratilova**
- (United States) **Pam Shriver**
**w/o**

3
- (West Germany) Steffi Graf
- (Argentina) Gabriela Sabatini

3
- (West Germany) **Steffi Graf**
- (Argentina) **Gabriela Sabatini**
**6**
**6**

- (France) Isabelle Demongeot
- (France) Nathalie Tauziat
3
1

1
- (United States) **Martina Navratilova**
- (United States) **Pam Shriver**
**6**
**6**

- (Soviet Union) Larisa Savchenko
- (Soviet Union) Natasha Zvereva
3
4

- (Soviet Union) **Larisa Savchenko**
- (Soviet Union) **Natasha Zvereva**
3
**6**
**6**

4
- (United States) Gigi Fernández
- (United States) Robin White
**6**
3
1

- (Soviet Union) **Larisa Savchenko**
- (Soviet Union) **Natasha Zvereva**
3
**6**
**7**

2
- (West Germany) Claudia Kohde-Kilsch
- (Czechoslovakia) Helena Suková
**6**
4
5

- (United States) Patty Fendick
- (Canada) Jill Hetherington
4
2

2
- (West Germany) **Claudia Kohde-Kilsch**
- (Czechoslovakia) **Helena Suková**
**6**
**6**
