= 1996 World Doubles Cup =

- Date: 22–25 May
- Edition: 22nd
- Draw: 8D
- Prize money: $188,125
- Surface: Clay / outdoor
- Location: Edinburgh, Scotland
- World Doubles Cup

1996 World Doubles Cup
- 1996 World Doubles Cup
- 1995 Champions: (United States) Meredith McGrath (Latvia) Larisa Savchenko

Final
- Champions: (United States) Nicole Arendt (Netherlands) Manon Bollegraf
- Runners-up: (United States) Gigi Fernández (Belarus) Natasha Zvereva
- Score: 6–3, 2–6, 7–6

Details
- Draw: 8D

Events
Doubles
- World Doubles Cup

The 1996 World Doubles Cup was a women's doubles tennis tournament played on outdoor clay courts at the Craiglockhart Tennis Centre in Edinburgh in Scotland that was part of the 1996 WTA Tour. It was the 22nd edition of the tournament and was held from 22 to 25 May 1996

Meredith McGrath and Larisa Savchenko were the defending champions but lost in the semifinals to Nicole Arendt and Manon Bollegraf. Arendt and Bollegraf won in the final 6–3, 2–6, 7–6 against Gigi Fernández and Natasha Zvereva. It was Arendt's 1st title of the year and the 5th of her career. It was Bollegraf's 2nd title of the year and the 23rd of her career

== Seeds ==
Champion seeds are indicated in bold text while text in italics indicates the round in which those seeds were eliminated.

1. (United States) Gigi Fernández / (Belarus) Natasha Zvereva (final)
2. (United States) Meredith McGrath / (Latvia) Larisa Savchenko (semifinals)
3. (United States) **Nicole Arendt** / (Netherlands) **Manon Bollegraf (champions)**
4. (United States) Katrina Adams / (South Africa) Mariaan de Swardt (semifinals)

== Draw ==
Key

- Q = Qualifier
- WC = Wild card
- LL = Lucky loser
- Alt = Alternate
- ITF = ITF entry
- PR = Protected ranking
- SR = Special ranking
- SE = Special exempt
- JE = Junior exempt
- JR = Junior Accelerator Programme entrant
- CO = College Accelerator Programme entrant
- NG = Next Gen Accelerator Program entrant
- w/o = Walkover
- r = Retired
- d = Defaulted

Quarterfinals
1	(United States) **Gigi Fernández** (Belarus) **Natasha Zvereva**	3	**6**	**6**
(Russia) Elena Makarova (Russia) Eugenia Maniokova	**6**	1	1
4	(United States) **Katrina Adams** (South Africa) **Mariaan de Swardt**	**6**	**6**
WC	(United States) Zina Garrison-Jackson (United States) Kathy Rinaldi-Stunkel	2	4
(Argentina) Patricia Tarabini (Netherlands) Caroline Vis	2	3
3	(United States) **Nicole Arendt** (Netherlands) **Manon Bollegraf**	**6**	**6**
(Canada) Jill Hetherington (Australia) Kristine Radford	3	**6**	3
2	(United States) **Meredith McGrath** (Latvia) **Larisa Savchenko**	**6**	3	**6**

Semifinals
1	(United States) **Gigi Fernández** (Belarus) **Natasha Zvereva**	**6**	5	**7**
4	(United States) Katrina Adams (South Africa) Mariaan de Swardt	1	**7**	6
3	(United States) **Nicole Arendt** (Netherlands) **Manon Bollegraf**	3	**6**	**6**
2	(United States) Meredith McGrath (Latvia) Larisa Savchenko	**6**	4	4

Final
1	(United States) Gigi Fernández (Belarus) Natasha Zvereva	3	**6**	6
3	(United States) **Nicole Arendt** (Netherlands) **Manon Bollegraf**	**6**	2	**7**
