= 1987 Bridgestone Doubles Championships =

- Date: January 26 – February 1
- Edition: 13th
- Draw: 8D
- Prize money: $175,000
- Surface: Carpet / indoor
- Location: Tokyo, Japan
← 1986 ·	WTA Doubles Championships	· 1988 →

1987 Bridgestone Doubles Championships
- 1987 Bridgestone Doubles Championships
- 1986 Champions: (United States) Barbara Potter (United States) Pam Shriver

Final
- Champions: (West Germany) Claudia Kohde-Kilsch (Czechoslovakia) Helena Suková
- Runners-up: (United States) Elise Burgin (United States) Pam Shriver
- Score: 6–1, 7–6^{(7–5)}

Details
- Draw: 8
- Seeds: 4

Events
Doubles
← 1986 ·	WTA Doubles Championships	· 1988 →

The 1987 Bridgestone Doubles Championships was a women's tennis tournament played on indoor carpet courts in Tokyo, Japan that was part of the 1987 Virginia Slims World Championship Series. It was the 13th edition of the tournament and was held from January 26 through February 1, 1987.

Barbara Potter and Pam Shriver were the defending champions, but Potter could not qualify for this year. Shriver teamed up with Elise Burgin and lost in the final to top seeds Claudia Kohde-Kilsch and Helena Suková, who earned $60,000 first-prize money. It was Kohde-Kilsch's 1st doubles title of the year and the 17th of her career. It was Suková's 1st doubles title of the year and the 18th of her career.

== Seeds ==
1. (West Germany) Claudia Kohde-Kilsch / (Czechoslovakia) Helena Suková (champions)
2. (United States) Elise Burgin / (United States) Pam Shriver (final)
3. (United States) Betsy Nagelsen / (Australia) Elizabeth Smylie (quarterfinals)
4. (United States) Gigi Fernández / (United States) Robin White (semifinals)

== Draw ==
=== Key ===
- Q = Qualifier
- WC = Wild card
- LL = Lucky loser
- Alt = Alternate
- ITF = ITF entry
- PR = Protected ranking
- SR = Special ranking
- SE = Special exempt
- JE = Junior exempt
- JR = Junior Accelerator Programme entrant
- CO = College Accelerator Programme entrant
- NG = Next Gen Accelerator Program entrant
- w/o = Walkover
- r = Retired
- d = Defaulted

=== Draw ===
Quarterfinals
1	(West Germany) Claudia Kohde-Kilsch (Czechoslovakia) Helena Suková	6	7^{8}
(United States) Beth Herr (United States) Alycia Moulton	2	6^{6}
4	(United States) Gigi Fernández (United States) Robin White	6	6
(Australia) Jenny Byrne (Australia) Janine Thompson	3	3
(United States) Sandy Collins (United States) Sharon Walsh-Pete	2	7^{7}	6
3	(United States) Betsy Nagelsen (Australia) Elizabeth Smylie	6	6^{3}	2
(United States) Candy Reynolds (United States) Anne Smith	3	5
2	(United States) Elise Burgin (United States) Pam Shriver	6	7

Semifinals
1	(West Germany) Claudia Kohde-Kilsch (Czechoslovakia) Helena Suková	6	1	6
4	(United States) Gigi Fernández (United States) Robin White	4	6	2
(United States) Sandy Collins (United States) Sharon Walsh-Pete	4	6	3
2	(United States) Elise Burgin (United States) Pam Shriver	6	4	6

Final
1	(West Germany) Claudia Kohde-Kilsch (Czechoslovakia) Helena Suková	6	7^{7}
2	(United States) Elise Burgin (United States) Pam Shriver	1	6^{5}
