= 1982 Bridgestone Doubles Championships =

- Date: April 15–18
- Edition: 8th
- Draw: 8D
- Prize money: $150,000
- Surface: Carpet / indoor
- Location: Fort Worth, Texas, United States
- Venue: Will Rogers Coliseum

Champions

Doubles
- (United States) Martina Navratilova / (United States) Pam Shriver
← 1981 ·	WTA Doubles Championships	· 1983 →

The 1982 Bridgestone Doubles Championships was a women's tennis tournament played on indoor carpet courts at the Will Rogers Coliseum in Fort Worth, Texas in the United States that was part of the Toyota Series of the 1982 WTA Tour. It was the eighth edition of the tournament and was held from April 15 through April 18, 1982.

== Final ==
=== Doubles ===
(United States) Martina Navratilova / (United States) Pam Shriver defeated (United States) Kathy Jordan / (United States) Anne Smith 7–5, 6–3

- It was Navratilova's 5th doubles title of the year and the 70th of her career. It was Shriver's 6th doubles title of the year and the 24th of her career.
