= 1986 Bridgestone Doubles Championships =

- Date: March 28–30
- Edition: 12th
- Draw: 8D
- Prize money: $175,000
- Surface: Carpet / indoor
- Location: Nashville, Tennessee, US

Champions

Doubles
- (United States) Barbara Potter / (United States) Pam Shriver
| ← 1985 · | WTA Doubles Championships | · 1987 → |

The 1986 Bridgestone Doubles Championships was a women's tennis tournament played on indoor carpet courts in Nashville, Tennessee in the United States that was part of the 1986 Virginia Slims World Championship Series. It was the 12th edition of the tournament and was held from March 28 through March 30, 1986. The first-seeded team of Barbara Potter and Pam Shriver won the title.

== Final ==
=== Doubles ===
(United States) Barbara Potter / (United States) Pam Shriver defeated (United States) Kathy Jordan / (Australia) Elizabeth Smylie 6–4, 6–3

- It was Potter's only doubles title of the year and the 18th of her career. It was Shriver's 4th doubles title of the year and the 71st of her career.
