= 1985 Bridgestone Doubles Championships =

- Date: April 5–7
- Edition: 11th
- Draw: 9D
- Prize money: $175,000
- Surface: Carpet / indoor
- Location: Tokyo, Japan

Champions

Doubles
- (United States) Kathy Jordan / (Australia) Elizabeth Smylie
| ← 1984 · | WTA Doubles Championships | · 1986 → |

The 1985 Bridgestone Doubles Championships was a women's tennis tournament played on indoor carpet courts in Tokyo, Japan that was part of the 1985 Virginia Slims World Championship Series. It was the 11th edition of the tournament and was held from April 5 through April 7, 1985. The first-seeded team of Kathy Jordan and Elizabeth Smylie won the title.

== Final ==
=== Doubles ===
(United States) Kathy Jordan / (Australia) Elizabeth Smylie defeated (United States) Betsy Nagelsen / (United States) Anne White 4–6, 7–5, 6–2

- It was Jordan's 3rd doubles title of the year and the 26th of her career. It was Smylie's 3rd doubles title of the year and the 8th of her career.
