= 1993 Light n' Lively Doubles Championships =

- Date: March 25–28
- Edition: 19th
- Draw: 8D
- Prize money: $175,000
- Surface: Clay / outdoor
- Location: Wesley Chapel, Florida, U.S.
- Venue: Saddlebrook Golf & Tennis Resort
| ← 1992 · | WTA Doubles Championships | · 1994 → |

1993 Light n' Lively Doubles Championships
- 1993 Light n' Lively Doubles Championships
- 1992 Champions: (Czechoslovakia) Jana Novotná (Latvia) Larisa Savchenko-Neiland

Final
- Champions: (United States) Gigi Fernández (Belarus) Natasha Zvereva
- Runners-up: (Latvia) Larisa Savchenko-Neiland (Spain) Arantxa Sánchez Vicario
- Score: 7–5, 6–3

Details
- Draw: 8 (1WC)
- Seeds: 4

Events
Doubles
| ← 1992 · | WTA Doubles Championships | · 1994 → |

The 1993 Light n' Lively Doubles Championships was a women's doubles tennis tournament played on outdoor clay courts at the Saddlebrook Golf & Tennis Resort in Wesley Chapel, Florida in the United States that was part of the 1993 WTA Tour. It was the 19th edition of the tournament and was held from March 25 through March 28, 1993.

Jana Novotná and Larisa Savchenko-Neiland were the defending champions, but Novotná could not compete this year. Savchenko-Neiland teamed up with Arantxa Sánchez Vicario and lost in the final to Gigi Fernández and Natasha Zvereva. The score was 7–5, 6–3. It was Fernández's 3rd doubles title of the year and the 34th of her career. It was Zvereva's 3rd doubles title of the year and the 31st of her career.

== Seeds ==
1. (United States) Gigi Fernández / (Belarus) Natasha Zvereva (champions)
2. (Latvia) Larisa Savchenko-Neiland / (Spain) Arantxa Sánchez Vicario (final)
3. (United States) Lori McNeil / (Australia) Rennae Stubbs (semifinals)
4. (United States) Pam Shriver / (Australia) Elizabeth Smylie (semifinals)

== Draw ==
=== Key ===
- Q = Qualifier
- WC = Wild card
- LL = Lucky loser
- Alt = Alternate
- ITF = ITF entry
- PR = Protected ranking
- SR = Special ranking
- SE = Special exempt
- JE = Junior exempt
- JR = Junior Accelerator Programme entrant
- CO = College Accelerator Programme entrant
- NG = Next Gen Accelerator Program entrant
- w/o = Walkover
- r = Retired
- d = Defaulted

=== Draw ===
Quarterfinals
1 | (United States) Gigi Fernández (Belarus) Natasha Zvereva | 6 | 2 | 7
WC | (United States) Tracy Austin (South Africa) Elna Reinach | 2 | 6 | 5
3 | (United States) Lori McNeil (Australia) Rennae Stubbs | 6 | 6
(South Africa) Rosalyn Fairbank-Nideffer (United States) Patty Fendick | 3 | 2
(Canada) Jill Hetherington (United States) Kathy Rinaldi | 6 | 5 | 4
4 | (United States) Pam Shriver (Australia) Elizabeth Smylie | 3 | 7 | 6
(United States) Sandy Collins (United States) Stephanie Rehe | 3 | 4
2 | (Latvia) Larisa Savchenko-Neiland (Spain) Arantxa Sánchez Vicario | 6 | 6

Semifinals
1 | (United States) Gigi Fernández (Belarus) Natasha Zvereva | 6 | 7
3 | (United States) Lori McNeil (Australia) Rennae Stubbs | 3 | 5
4 | (United States) Pam Shriver (Australia) Elizabeth Smylie | 5 | 5
2 | (Latvia) Larisa Savchenko-Neiland (Spain) Arantxa Sánchez Vicario | 7 | 7

Final
1 | (United States) Gigi Fernández (Belarus) Natasha Zvereva | 7 | 6
2 | (Latvia) Larisa Savchenko-Neiland (Spain) Arantxa Sánchez Vicario | 5 | 3
