= 1988 World Doubles Championships =

- Date: 25–27 November
- Edition: 14th
- Draw: 8D
- Prize money: $ 250,000
- Surface: Carpet / indoor
- Location: Tokyo, Japan
← 1987 ·	World Doubles Championships	· 1989 →

1988 World Doubles Championships
- 1988 World Doubles Championships
- 1987 Champions: (West Germany) Claudia Kohde-Kilsch (Czechoslovakia) Helena Suková

Final
- Champions: (United States) Katrina Adams (United States) Zina Garrison
- Runners-up: (United States) Gigi Fernández (United States) Robin White
- Score: 7–5, 7–5

Details
- Draw: 8D

Events
Doubles
← 1987 ·	World Doubles Championships	· 1989 →

The 1988 World Doubles Championships was a women's tennis tournament played on indoor carpet courts in Tokyo in Japan and was part of the 1988 WTA Tour. It was the 14th edition of the tournament and was held from 25 November through 27 November 1988.

Claudia Kohde-Kilsch and Helena Suková were the defending champions but did not compete that year. Unseeded pairing Katrina Adams and Zina Garrison won in the final 7–5, 7–5 against Gigi Fernández and Robin White. It was Adams' 3rd title of the year and the 4th of her career. It was Garrison's 5th title of the year and the 15th of her career.

== Seeds ==
Champion seeds are indicated in bold text while text in italics indicates the round in which those seeds were eliminated.

1. (United States) Gigi Fernández / (United States) Robin White (final)
2. (United States) Lori McNeil / (United States) Betsy Nagelsen (quarterfinals)
3. (West Germany) Eva Pfaff / (Australia) Elizabeth Smylie (semifinals)
4. (United States) Patty Fendick / (Canada) Jill Hetherington (semifinals)

== Draw ==
=== Key ===
- Q = Qualifier
- WC = Wild card
- LL = Lucky loser
- Alt = Alternate
- ITF = ITF entry
- PR = Protected ranking
- SR = Special ranking
- SE = Special exempt
- JE = Junior exempt
- JR = Junior Accelerator Programme entrant
- CO = College Accelerator Programme entrant
- NG = Next Gen Accelerator Program entrant
- w/o = Walkover
- r = Retired
- d = Defaulted

Quarterfinals
1	(United States) **Gigi Fernández** (United States) **Robin White**	**7**	**6**
(United States) Anne Smith (Australia) Janine Tremelling	6	4
4	(United States) **Patty Fendick** (Canada) **Jill Hetherington**	**6**	6	**6**
(Bulgaria) Katerina Maleeva (Bulgaria) Manuela Maleeva	4	**7**	3
(United States) Beth Herr (United States) Candy Reynolds	5	4
3	(West Germany) **Eva Pfaff** (Australia) **Elizabeth Smylie**	**7**	**6**
(United States) **Katrina Adams** (United States) **Zina Garrison**	5	**6**	**7**
2	(United States) Lori McNeil (United States) Betsy Nagelsen	**7**	2	5

Semifinals
1	(United States) **Gigi Fernández** (United States) **Robin White**	**7**	**7**
4	(United States) Patty Fendick (Canada) Jill Hetherington	5	5
3	(West Germany) Eva Pfaff (Australia) Elizabeth Smylie	**6**	0	2
(United States) **Katrina Adams** (United States) **Zina Garrison**	2	**6**	**6**

Final
1	(United States) Gigi Fernández (United States) Robin White	5	5
(United States) **Katrina Adams** (United States) **Zina Garrison**	**7**	**7**
