= 1989 Virginia Slims Championships – Doubles =

Doubles
- 1989 Virginia Slims Championships

Final
- Champions: (United States) Martina Navratilova (United States) Pam Shriver
- Runners-up: (Soviet Union) Larisa Savchenko (Soviet Union) Natasha Zvereva
- Score: 6–3, 6–2

Details
- Draw: 8
- Seeds: 4

Events
Singles	Doubles
← 1988 ·	WTA Tour Championships	· 1990 →

Three-time defending champions Martina Navratilova and Pam Shriver defeated Larisa Savchenko and Natasha Zvereva in a rematch of the previous year's final, 6–3, 6–2 to win the doubles tennis title at the 1989 Virginia Slims Championships. It was Navratilova's twelfth Tour Finals doubles title, and Shriver's ninth.

== Seeds ==
1. (United States) Martina Navratilova / (United States) Pam Shriver (champions)
2. (Czechoslovakia) Jana Novotná / (Czechoslovakia) Helena Suková (semifinals)
3. (Soviet Union) Larisa Savchenko / (Soviet Union) Natasha Zvereva (final)
4. (United States) Katrina Adams / (United States) Zina Garrison (quarterfinals)

== Draw ==
=== Key ===
- Q = Qualifier
- WC = Wild card
- LL = Lucky loser
- Alt = Alternate
- SE = Special exempt
- PR = Protected ranking
- ITF = ITF entry
- JE = Junior exempt
- w/o = Walkover
- r = Retired
- d = Defaulted
- SR = Special ranking

=== Draw ===
Quarterfinals
1	(United States) Martina Navratilova (United States) Pam Shriver	5	7	7
(United States) Elise Burgin (South Africa) Rosalyn Fairbank	7	5	5
4	(United States) Katrina Adams (United States) Zina Garrison	3	6
(Australia) Wendy Turnbull (Australia) Elizabeth Smylie	6	7
(United States) Robin White (United States) Gigi Fernández	2	4
3	(Soviet Union) Larisa Savchenko (Soviet Union) Natasha Zvereva	6	6
(United States) Patty Fendick (Canada) Jill Hetherington	3	7	5
2	(Czechoslovakia) Jana Novotná (Czechoslovakia) Helena Suková	6	5	7

Semifinals
1	(United States) Martina Navratilova (United States) Pam Shriver	6	6
(Australia) Wendy Turnbull (Australia) Elizabeth Smylie	1	1
3	(Soviet Union) Larisa Savchenko (Soviet Union) Natasha Zvereva	3	7	6
2	(Czechoslovakia) Jana Novotná (Czechoslovakia) Helena Suková	6	6	4

Final
1	(United States) Martina Navratilova (United States) Pam Shriver	6	6
3	(Soviet Union) Larisa Savchenko (Soviet Union) Natasha Zvereva	3	2
