= 1988 Virginia Slims of Chicago – Doubles =

Doubles
- 1988 Virginia Slims of Chicago
- 1987 Champions: (West Germany) Claudia Kohde-Kilsch (Czechoslovakia) Helena Suková

Final
- Champions: (United States) Lori McNeil (United States) Betsy Nagelsen
- Runners-up: (Soviet Union) Larisa Savchenko (Soviet Union) Natasha Zvereva
- Score: 6–4, 3–6, 6–4

Events
Singles	Doubles
← 1987 ·	Virginia Slims of Chicago	· 1989 →

Claudia Kohde-Kilsch and Helena Suková were the defending champions but lost in the first round to Isabelle Demongeot and Nathalie Tauziat.

Lori McNeil and Betsy Nagelsen won in the final 6–4, 3–6, 6–4 against Larisa Savchenko and Natasha Zvereva.

== Seeds ==
Champion seeds are indicated in bold text while text in italics indicates the round in which those seeds were eliminated.

1. (West Germany) Claudia Kohde-Kilsch / (Czechoslovakia) Helena Suková (first round)
2. (United States) Gigi Fernández / (United States) Robin White (quarterfinals)
3. (United States) **Lori McNeil** / (United States) **Betsy Nagelsen (champions)**
4. (Soviet Union) Larisa Savchenko / (Soviet Union) Natasha Zvereva (final)

== Draw ==
=== Key ===
- Q = Qualifier
- WC = Wild card
- LL = Lucky loser
- Alt = Alternate
- SE = Special exempt
- PR = Protected ranking
- ITF = ITF entry
- JE = Junior exempt
- w/o = Walkover
- r = Retired
- d = Defaulted
- SR = Special ranking

First round
1	(West Germany) C Kohde-Kilsch (Czechoslovakia) H Suková	**6**	1	2
(France) **I Demongeot** (France) **N Tauziat**	2	**6**	**6**
(United States) **A Henricksson** (United States) **A Smith**	**6**	**6**
(United States) Ca MacGregor (United States) Cy MacGregor	2	2
4	(Soviet Union) **L Savchenko** (Soviet Union) **N Zvereva**	**4**
(United States) R Casals (United States) S Rehe	1	r
(United States) **M L Daniels** (Hong Kong) **P Hy**	**6**	**6**
(United States) A Leand (United States) K Rinaldi	4	1
(United States) **L Antonoplis** (United States) **S Collins**	**6**	**7**
(South Africa) L Gregory (United States) R Reis	3	5
(United States) C Evert (Australia) W Turnbull	5	0
3	(United States) **L McNeil** (United States) **B Nagelsen**	**7**	**6**
(United States) **K Adams** (United States) **Z Garrison**	**6**	**7**
(United States) E Burgin (South Africa) R Fairbank	4	5
(Australia) J Byrne (Australia) J Tremelling	2	5
2	(United States) **G Fernández** (United States) **R White**	**6**	**7**

Quarterfinals
(France) I Demongeot (France) N Tauziat	4	**6**	6
(United States) **A Henricksson** (United States) **A Smith**	**6**	4	**7**
4	(Soviet Union) **L Savchenko** (Soviet Union) **N Zvereva**	**6**	**6**
(United States) M L Daniels (Hong Kong) P Hy	1	1
(United States) L Antonoplis (United States) S Collins	4	**6**	3
3	(United States) **L McNeil** (United States) **B Nagelsen**	**6**	3	**6**
(United States) **K Adams** (United States) **Z Garrison**	**6**	**6**
2	(United States) G Fernández (United States) R White	1	4

Semifinals
(United States) A Henricksson (United States) A Smith	3	3
4	(Soviet Union) **L Savchenko** (Soviet Union) **N Zvereva**	**6**	**6**
3	(United States) **L McNeil** (United States) **B Nagelsen**	**6**	**7**
(United States) K Adams (United States) Z Garrison	1	6

Final
4	(Soviet Union) Larisa Savchenko (Soviet Union) Natasha Zvereva	4	**6**	4
3	(United States) **Lori McNeil** (United States) **Betsy Nagelsen**	**6**	3	**6**
