= 1978 Bridgestone Doubles Championships =

- Date: April 5–8
- Edition: 4th
- Draw: 8D
- Prize money: $100,000
- Surface: Carpet / indoor
- Location: Salt Lake City, Utah, US
- Venue: Salt Palace

Champions

Doubles
- (United States) Billie Jean King / (United States) Martina Navratilova
← 1977 ·	WTA Doubles Championships	· 1979 →

The 1978 Bridgestone Doubles Championships was a women's tennis tournament played on indoor carpet courts at the Salt Palace in Salt Lake City, Utah in the United States that was part of the Colgate Series of the 1978 WTA Tour. It was the fourth edition of the tournament and was held from April 5 through April 8, 1978. The first-seeded team of Billie Jean King and Martina Navratilova won the title and earned $36,000 first-prize money

It also served as the doubles tournament for the 1978 Virginia Slims Championships (WTA Finals) – the singles were played in Oakland, California.

== Final ==
=== Doubles ===
(United States) Billie Jean King / (United States) Martina Navratilova defeated (France) Françoise Dürr / (United Kingdom) Virginia Wade 6–4, 6–4

== See also ==
- 1978 Colgate Series Championships
