= 1989 Virginia Slims Doubles Championships =

- Date: 15–17 September
- Edition: 15th
- Draw: 8D
- Prize money: $175,000
- Surface: Carpet / indoor
- Location: Tokyo, Japan

Champions

Doubles
- (United States) Gigi Fernández / (United States) Robin White
← 1988 ·	WTA Doubles Championships	· 1990 →

The 1989 Virginia Slims Doubles Championships was a women's tennis tournament played on indoor carpet courts in Tokyo in Japan and was part of the 1989 WTA Tour. It was the 15th edition of the tournament and was held from 15 September through 17 September 1989. The first-seeded team of Gigi Fernández and Zina Garrison won the title.

== Final ==
=== Doubles ===
(United States) Gigi Fernández / (United States) Robin White defeated (Australia) Elizabeth Smylie / (Australia) Wendy Turnbull 6–2, 6–2

- It was Fernández's 3rd doubles title of the year and the 12th of her career. It was White's 2nd doubles title of the year and the 10th of her career.
