= WTA Doubles Championships =

Defunct tennis tournament
- Event name: Bridgestone Doubles Championships (1975–87); World Doubles Championships (1988, 1990); VS International Doubles Championships (1989); Light 'n' Lively Doubles Championships (1991–94); World Doubles Cup (1995–97)
- Tour: WTA Tour (1975–97)
- Founded: 1975
- Abolished: 1997
- Editions: 23
- Surface: Carpet (1975–81, 1983–90); Clay (1982, 1991–97)

The WTA Doubles Championships is a defunct WTA Tour affiliated tennis tournament for doubles, played from 1975 to 1997. It was held on indoor carpet courts from 1975 to 1981 and from 1983 to 1990, and on outdoor clay courts in 1982 and from 1991 to 1997.

Year	Location
1975–1977	Tokyo, Japan
1978	Salt Lake City, Utah
1979–1981	Tokyo, Japan
1982	Fort Worth, Texas
1983–1985	Tokyo, Japan
1986	Nashville, Tennessee
1987–1989	Tokyo, Japan
1990	Orlando, Florida
1991	Tarpon Springs, Florida
1992–1994	Wesley Chapel, Florida
1995–1997	Edinburgh, Scotland

== Finals ==
Year	Champions	Runners-up	Score
1975	(Australia) Margaret Court (United Kingdom) Virginia Wade	(United States) Rosemary Casals (United States) Billie Jean King	6–7, 7–6, 6–2
1976	(United States) Billie Jean King (Netherlands) Betty Stöve	(United States) Mona Guerrant (United States) Ann Kiyomura	6–3, 6–2
1977	(Czechoslovakia) Martina Navratilova (Netherlands) Betty Stöve	(France) Françoise Dürr (United Kingdom) Virginia Wade	7–5, 6–3
1978	(United States) Billie Jean King (Czechoslovakia) Martina Navratilova	(France) Françoise Dürr (United Kingdom) Virginia Wade	6–4, 6–4
1979	(France) Françoise Dürr (Netherlands) Betty Stöve	(United Kingdom) Sue Barker (United States) Ann Kiyomura	7–5, 7–6
1980	(United States) Billie Jean King (United States) Martina Navratilova	(United Kingdom) Sue Barker (United States) Ann Kiyomura	7–5, 6–3
1981	(United Kingdom) Sue Barker (United States) Ann Kiyomura	(United States) Barbara Potter (United States) Sharon Walsh	7–5, 6–2
1982	(United States) Martina Navratilova (United States) Pam Shriver	(United States) Kathy Jordan (United States) Anne Smith	7–5, 6–3
1983	(United States) Billie Jean King (United States) Sharon Walsh	(United States) Kathy Jordan (United States) Anne Smith	6–1, 6–1
1984	(United States) Ann Kiyomura (United States) Pam Shriver	(United States) Barbara Jordan (Australia) Elizabeth Sayers	6–3, 6–7, 6–3
1985	(United States) Kathy Jordan (Australia) Elizabeth Smylie	(United States) Betsy Nagelsen (United States) Anne White	4–6, 7–5, 6–2
1986	(United States) Barbara Potter (United States) Pam Shriver	(United States) Kathy Jordan (Australia) Elizabeth Smylie	6–4, 6–3
1987	(West Germany) Claudia Kohde-Kilsch (Czechoslovakia) Helena Suková	(United States) Elise Burgin (United States) Pam Shriver	6–1, 7–6^{(7–5)}
1988	(United States) Katrina Adams (United States) Zina Garrison	(United States) Gigi Fernández (United States) Robin White	7–5, 7–5
1989	(United States) Gigi Fernández (United States) Robin White	(Australia) Elizabeth Smylie (Australia) Wendy Turnbull	6–2, 6–2
1990	(Soviet Union) Larisa Savchenko (Soviet Union) Natasha Zvereva	(Netherlands) Manon Bollegraf (United States) Meredith McGrath	6–4, 6–1
1991	(United States) Gigi Fernández (Czechoslovakia) Helena Suková	(Soviet Union) Larisa Savchenko (Soviet Union) Natasha Zvereva	4–6, 6–4, 7–6
1992	(Czechoslovakia) Jana Novotná (Commonwealth of Independent States) Larisa Savchenko	(Spain) Arantxa Sánchez Vicario (Commonwealth of Independent States) Natasha Zvereva	6–4, 6–2
1993	(United States) Gigi Fernández (Belarus) Natasha Zvereva	(Spain) Arantxa Sánchez Vicario (Latvia) Larisa Savchenko	7–5, 6–3
1994	(Czech Republic) Jana Novotná (Spain) Arantxa Sánchez Vicario	(United States) Gigi Fernández (Belarus) Natasha Zvereva	6–2, 7–5
1995	(United States) Meredith McGrath (Latvia) Larisa Savchenko	(Netherlands) Manon Bollegraf (Australia) Rennae Stubbs	6–2, 7–6
1996	(United States) Nicole Arendt (Netherlands) Manon Bollegraf	(United States) Gigi Fernández (Belarus) Natasha Zvereva	6–3, 2–6, 7–6
1997	(United States) Nicole Arendt (Netherlands) Manon Bollegraf	(Australia) Rachel McQuillan (Japan) Nana Miyagi	6–1, 3–6, 7–5

== Winners ==
Player	Wins	Total	Final	Total
(United States) Billie Jean King	4	1976, 1978, 1980, 1983	1	1975
(Czechoslovakia) (United States) Martina Navratilova	4	1977, 1978, 1980, 1982	0	
(United States) Gigi Fernández	3	1989, 1991, 1993	3	1988, 1994, 1996
(Soviet Union) (Commonwealth of Independent States) (Latvia) Larisa Savchenko	3	1990, 1992, 1995	2	1991, 1993
(United States) Pam Shriver	3	1982, 1984, 1986	1	1987
(Netherlands) Betty Stöve	3	1976, 1977, 1979	0	
(Soviet Union) (Commonwealth of Independent States) (Belarus) Natasha Zvereva	2	1990, 1993	4	1991, 1992, 1994, 1996
(United States) Ann Kiyomura	2	1981, 1984	3	1976, 1979, 1980
(Netherlands) Manon Bollegraf	2	1996, 1997	2	1990, 1995
(United States) Nicole Arendt	2	1996, 1997	0	
(Czechoslovakia) (Czech Republic) Jana Novotná	2	1992, 1994	0	
(Czechoslovakia) Helena Suková	2	1987, 1991	0	
(Australia) Elizabeth Smylie	1	1985	3	1984, 1986, 1989
(United States) Kathy Jordan	1	1985	3	1982, 1983, 1986
(Spain) Arantxa Sánchez Vicario	1	1994	2	1992, 1993
(United Kingdom) Sue Barker	1	1981	2	1979, 1980
(France) Françoise Dürr	1	1979	2	1977, 1978
(United Kingdom) Virginia Wade	1	1975	2	1977, 1978
(United States) Meredith McGrath	1	1995	1	1990
(United States) Robin White	1	1989	1	1988
(United States) Barbara Potter	1	1986	1	1981
(United States) Sharon Walsh	1	1983	1	1981
(United States) Zina Garrison	1	1988	0	
(United States) Katrina Adams	1	1988	0	
(West Germany) Claudia Kohde-Kilsch	1	1987	0	
(Australia) Margaret Court	1	1975	0	
(United States) Anne Smith	0		2	1982, 1983
(Japan) Nana Miyagi	0		1	1997
(Australia) Rachel McQuillan	0		1	1997
(Australia) Rennae Stubbs	0		1	1995
(Australia) Wendy Turnbull	0		1	1989
(United States) Elise Burgin	0		1	1987
(United States) Anne White	0		1	1985
(United States) Betsy Nagelsen	0		1	1985
(United States) Barbara Jordan	0		1	1984
(United States) Mona Guerrant	0		1	1976
(United States) Rosemary Casals	0		1	1975
