= 1991 Light n' Lively Doubles Championships =

- Date: March 28–31
- Edition: 17th
- Draw: 8D
- Prize money: $200,000
- Surface: Clay / outdoor
- Location: Tarpon Springs, Florida, U.S.
← 1990 ·	WTA Doubles Championships	· 1992 →

1991 Light n' Lively Doubles Championships
- 1991 Light n' Lively Doubles Championships
- 1990 Champions: (Soviet Union) Larisa Savchenko (Soviet Union) Natasha Zvereva

Final
- Champions: (United States) Gigi Fernández (Czechoslovakia) Helena Suková
- Runners-up: (Soviet Union) Larisa Savchenko (Soviet Union) Natasha Zvereva
- Score: 4–6, 6–4, 7–6^{(7–3)}

Details
- Draw: 8
- Seeds: 4

Events
Doubles
← 1990 ·	WTA Doubles Championships	· 1992 →

The 1991 Light n' Lively Doubles Championships was a women's doubles tennis tournament played on outdoor clay courts in Tarpon Springs, Florida in the United States that was part of the 1991 WTA Tour. It was the 17th edition of the tournament and was held from March 28 through March 31, 1991.

Larisa Savchenko and Natasha Zvereva were the defending champions, but lost in the final to Gigi Fernández and Helena Suková. The final score was 4–6, 6–4, 7–6^{(7–3)}. It was Fernández's 3rd doubles title of the year and the 21st of her career. It was Suková's 2nd doubles title of the year and the 43rd of her career.

== Seeds ==
1. (United States) Gigi Fernández / (Czechoslovakia) Helena Suková (champions)
2. (Soviet Union) Larisa Savchenko / (Soviet Union) Natasha Zvereva (final)
3. (United States) Kathy Jordan / (Australia) Elizabeth Smylie (semifinals)
4. (Spain) Arantxa Sánchez Vicario / (United States) Robin White (semifinals)

== Draw ==
=== Key ===
- Q = Qualifier
- WC = Wild card
- LL = Lucky loser
- Alt = Alternate
- ITF = ITF entry
- PR = Protected ranking
- SR = Special ranking
- SE = Special exempt
- JE = Junior exempt
- JR = Junior Accelerator Programme entrant
- CO = College Accelerator Programme entrant
- NG = Next Gen Accelerator Program entrant
- w/o = Walkover
- r = Retired
- d = Defaulted

=== Draw ===
Quarterfinals
1	(United States) Gigi Fernández (Czechoslovakia) Helena Suková	6	6
(United States) Elise Burgin (United States) Mary Lou Daniels	3	4
3	(United States) Kathy Jordan (Australia) Elizabeth Smylie	6	6
(United States) Meredith McGrath (United States) Anne Smith	3	3
(Netherlands) Manon Bollegraf (South Africa) Lise Gregory	3	3
4	(Spain) Arantxa Sánchez Vicario (United States) Robin White	6	6
(South Africa) Rosalyn Fairbank-Nideffer (Netherlands) Brenda Schultz	4	4
2	(Soviet Union) Larisa Savchenko (Soviet Union) Natasha Zvereva	6	6

Semifinals
1	(United States) Gigi Fernández (Czechoslovakia) Helena Suková	4	6	6
3	(United States) Kathy Jordan (Australia) Elizabeth Smylie	6	4	1
4	(Spain) Arantxa Sánchez Vicario (United States) Robin White	1	3
2	(Soviet Union) Larisa Savchenko (Soviet Union) Natasha Zvereva	6	6

Final
1	(United States) Gigi Fernández (Czechoslovakia) Helena Suková	4	6	7^{7}
2	(Soviet Union) Larisa Savchenko (Soviet Union) Natasha Zvereva	6	4	6^{3}
