= 1990 Light n' Lively Doubles Championships =

- Date: September 12–16
- Edition: 16th
- Draw: 12D
- Prize money: $175,000
- Surface: Clay / outdoor
- Location: Orlando, Florida, U.S.
| ← 1989 · | WTA Doubles Championships | · 1991 → |

1990 Light n' Lively Doubles Championships
- 1990 Light n' Lively Doubles Championships
- 1989 Champions: (United States) Gigi Fernández (United States) Robin White

Final
- Champions: (Soviet Union) Larisa Savchenko (Soviet Union) Natasha Zvereva
- Runners-up: (Netherlands) Manon Bollegraf (United States) Meredith McGrath
- Score: 6–4, 6–1

Details
- Draw: 12
- Seeds: 4

Events
Doubles
| ← 1989 · | WTA Doubles Championships | · 1991 → |

The 1990 Light n' Lively Doubles Championships was a women's doubles tennis tournament played on outdoor clay courts in Orlando, Florida in the United States that was part of the 1990 WTA Tour. It was the 16th edition of the tournament and was held from September 12 through September 16, 1990.

Larisa Savchenko and Natasha Zvereva won the title and earned $50,000 first-prize money by defeating Manon Bollegraf and Meredith McGrath 6–4, 6–1 in the final. It was Savchenko's 3rd doubles title of the year and the 10th of her career. It was Zvereva's 3rd doubles title of the year and the 10th of her career.

== Seeds ==
The top four seeds received a bye to the quarterfinals.

1. (Soviet Union) Larisa Savchenko / (Soviet Union) Natasha Zvereva (champions)
2. (United States) Gigi Fernández / (United States) Robin White (semifinals)
3. (United States) Kathy Jordan / (Australia) Elizabeth Smylie (quarterfinals)
4. (United States) Patty Fendick / (United States) Betsy Nagelsen (quarterfinals)

== Draw ==
=== Key ===
- Q = Qualifier
- WC = Wild card
- LL = Lucky loser
- Alt = Alternate
- ITF = ITF entry
- PR = Protected ranking
- SR = Special ranking
- SE = Special exempt
- JE = Junior exempt
- JR = Junior Accelerator Programme entrant
- CO = College Accelerator Programme entrant
- NG = Next Gen Accelerator Program entrant
- w/o = Walkover
- r = Retired
- d = Defaulted

=== Draw ===
First round
(United States) ML Daniels (United States) W White-Prausa | 6 | 6
(New Zealand) J Richardson (Australia) W Turnbull | 1 | 2
(Australia) N Provis (South Africa) E Reinach | 4 | 6 | 5
(United States) K Adams (United States) L McNeil | 6 | 4 | 7
(United States) A Smith (Hungary) A Temesvári | 2 | 4
(Netherlands) M Bollegraf (United States) M McGrath | 6 | 6
(Soviet Union) N Medvedeva (Soviet Union) L Meskhi | 3 | 4
(United States) E Burgin (South Africa) R Fairbank-Nideffer | 6 | 6

Quarterfinals
1 | (Soviet Union) L Savchenko (Soviet Union) N Zvereva | 7 | 6
(United States) ML Daniels (United States) W White-Prausa | 5 | 3
4 | (United States) P Fendick (United States) B Nagelsen | 3 | 3
(United States) K Adams (United States) L McNeil | 6 | 6
(Netherlands) M Bollegraf (United States) M McGrath | 6 | 5 | 6
3 | (United States) K Jordan (Australia) E Smylie | 2 | 7 | 4
(United States) E Burgin (South Africa) R Fairbank-Nideffer | 2 | 1
2 | (United States) G Fernández (United States) R White | 6 | 6

Semifinals
1 | (Soviet Union) L Savchenko (Soviet Union) N Zvereva | 7^{7} | 3 | 6
(United States) K Adams (United States) L McNeil | 6^{2} | 6 | 2
(Netherlands) M Bollegraf (United States) M McGrath | 6 | 6
2 | (United States) G Fernández (United States) R White | 2 | 4

Final
1 | (Soviet Union) L Savchenko (Soviet Union) N Zvereva | 6 | 6
(Netherlands) M Bollegraf (United States) M McGrath | 4 | 1
