= 1995 World Doubles Cup =

Sports competition

- Date: 24–27 May
- Edition: 21st
- Draw: 8D
- Prize money: $188,125
- Surface: Clay / outdoor
- Location: Edinburgh, Scotland
- World Doubles Cup

1995 World Doubles Cup
- 1995 World Doubles Cup
- 1994 Champions: (Czech Republic) Jana Novotná (Spain) Arantxa Sánchez Vicario

Final
- Champions: (United States) Meredith McGrath (Latvia) Larisa Neiland
- Runners-up: (Netherlands) Manon Bollegraf (Australia) Rennae Stubbs
- Score: 6–2, 7–6^{(7–2)}

Details
- Draw: 8
- Seeds: 4

Events
Doubles
- World Doubles Cup

The 1995 World Doubles Cup was a women's doubles tennis tournament played on outdoor clay courts at the Craiglockhart Tennis Centre in Edinburgh in Scotland that was part of the 1995 WTA Tour. It was the 21st edition of the tournament and was held from 24 May until 27 May 1995.

Jana Novotná and Arantxa Sánchez Vicario were the reigning champions but did not compete that year. Top-seeded pair Meredith McGrath and Larisa Neiland won in the final 6–2, 7–6^{(7–2)} against Manon Bollegraf and Rennae Stubbs. It was McGrath's 3rd title of the year and the 21st of her career. It was Savchenko's 3rd title of the year and the 54th of her career.

== Seeds ==
Champion seeds are indicated in bold text while text in italics indicates the round in which those seeds were eliminated.

1. (United States) **Meredith McGrath** / (Latvia) **Larisa Neiland (champions)**
2. (Netherlands) Manon Bollegraf / (Australia) Rennae Stubbs (final)
3. (United States) Nicole Arendt / (Italy) Laura Golarsa (quarterfinals)
4. (United States) Katrina Adams / (United States) Zina Garrison-Jackson (semifinals)

== Draw ==
Key

- Q = Qualifier
- WC = Wild card
- LL = Lucky loser
- Alt = Alternate
- ITF = ITF entry
- PR = Protected ranking
- SR = Special ranking
- SE = Special exempt
- JE = Junior exempt
- JR = Junior Accelerator Programme entrant
- CO = College Accelerator Programme entrant
- NG = Next Gen Accelerator Program entrant
- w/o = Walkover
- r = Retired
- d = Defaulted

Quarterfinals
1	(United States) **Meredith McGrath** (Latvia) **Larisa Neiland**	**6**	**6**
(Sweden) Maria Lindström (Sweden) Maria Strandlund	2	4
4	(United States) **Katrina Adams** (United States) **Zina Garrison-Jackson**	**6**	**6**
(United States) Debbie Graham (United States) Linda Harvey-Wild	3	4
(United States) **Patty Fendick** (Canada) **Jill Hetherington**	**6**	**7^{7}**
3	(United States) Nicole Arendt (Italy) Laura Golarsa	4	6^{4}
WC	(United Kingdom) Julie Pullin (United Kingdom) Lorna Woodroffe	4	3
2	(Netherlands) **Manon Bollegraf** (Australia) **Rennae Stubbs**	**6**	**6**

Semifinals
1	(United States) **Meredith McGrath** (Latvia) **Larisa Neiland**	**7**	**6**
4	(United States) Katrina Adams (United States) Zina Garrison-Jackson	5	1
(United States) Patty Fendick (Canada) Jill Hetherington	**6**	1	4
2	(Netherlands) **Manon Bollegraf** (Australia) **Rennae Stubbs**	0	**6**	**6**

Final
1	(United States) **Meredith McGrath** (Latvia) **Larisa Neiland**	**6**	**7^{7}**
2	(Netherlands) Manon Bollegraf (Australia) Rennae Stubbs	2	6^{2}
