= 1987 Virginia Slims of Chicago =

- Date: November 9–15
- Edition: 16th
- Category: Category 3
- Draw: 32S / 16D
- Prize money: $150,000
- Surface: Carpet (Supreme) / indoor
- Location: Chicago, Illinois, U.S.
- Venue: UIC Pavilion

Champions

Singles
- (United States) Martina Navratilova

Doubles
- (West Germany) Claudia Kohde-Kilsch (Czechoslovakia) Helena Suková
← 1986 ·	Virginia Slims of Chicago	· 1988 →

The 1987 Virginia Slims of Chicago was a women's tennis tournament played on indoor carpet courts at the UIC Pavilion in Chicago, Illinois in the United States and was part of the Category 3 tier of the 1987 WTA Tour. It was the 16th edition of the tournament and was held from November 9 through November 15, 1987. First-seeded Martina Navratilova won the singles title, her second consecutive and eighth in total at the event.

== Finals ==
=== Singles ===
(United States) Martina Navratilova defeated (Soviet Union) Natasha Zvereva 6–1, 6–2

- It was Navratilova's 4th singles title of the year and the 129th of her career.

=== Doubles ===
(West Germany) Claudia Kohde-Kilsch / (Czechoslovakia) Helena Suková defeated (United States) Zina Garrison / (United States) Lori McNeil 6–4, 6–3
