= 1989 Virginia Slims of Chicago =

- Date: November 6–12
- Edition: 18th
- Category: Category 4
- Draw: 28S / 16D
- Prize money: $250,000
- Surface: Carpet (Supreme) / indoor
- Location: Chicago, Illinois, U.S.
- Venue: UIC Pavilion

Champions

Singles
- (United States) Zina Garrison

Doubles
- (Soviet Union) Larisa Savchenko (Soviet Union) Natasha Zvereva
- Virginia Slims of Chicago

The 1989 Virginia Slims of Chicago was a women's tennis tournament played on indoor carpet courts at the UIC Pavilion in Chicago, Illinois in the United States and was part of the Category 4 tier of the 1989 WTA Tour. It was the 18th edition of the tournament and was held from November 6 through November 12, 1989. Second-seeded Zina Garrison won the singles title.

== Finals ==
=== Singles ===
(United States) Zina Garrison defeated (Soviet Union) Larisa Savchenko 6–3, 2–6, 6–4

- It was Garrison's 3rd singles title of the year and the 9th of her career.

=== Doubles ===
(Soviet Union) Larisa Savchenko / (Soviet Union) Natasha Zvereva defeated (Czechoslovakia) Jana Novotná / (Czechoslovakia) Helena Suková 6–3, 2–6, 6–3
