= Ann Kiyomura =

American tennis player

- Full name: Ann Kiyomura-Hayashi
- Country (sports): United States
- Born: August 22, 1955 (age 70) San Mateo, California, US
- Height: 5 ft 1 in (1.55 m)
- Plays: Right-handed
- Prize money: US$ 625,453

Singles
- Career titles: 2
- Highest ranking: No. 15 (December 31, 1979)

Grand Slam singles results
- Australian Open: 3R (1974)
- Wimbledon: 3R (1974, 1977, 1984)
- US Open: 4R (1978)

Doubles
- Career titles: 15

Grand Slam doubles results
- Australian Open: F (1980)
- French Open: 3R (1983)
- Wimbledon: W (1975)
- US Open: SF (1976)

Grand Slam mixed doubles results
- Wimbledon: QF (1977, 1980)
- US Open: QF (1976, 1980)

Ann Kiyomura-Hayashi (born August 22, 1955) is a retired American professional tennis player. She is from San Mateo, California.

== Early years ==
Born in San Mateo, California, Kiyomura was the youngest of four children. Her father Harry was a tennis instructor, while her American born mother Hisayo had become Japan's number ranked player during her two-year residency in Japan. At age nine, Kiyomura won the San Mateo County Recreation Department's tennis tournament. She continued to excel at tennis while attending Aragon High School in San Mateo.

== Tennis career ==
Kiyomura won a total of 17 national junior tennis titles, and in 1973, she won the Wimbledon junior singles title, beating Martina Navratilova.

Kiyomura played on the WTA Tour from 1973 to 1984. She played in 11 US Opens, reaching the fourth round in 1978. In 1975, she won the Wimbledon women's doubles title, playing with Kazuko Sawamatsu. She reached the final of the Australian Open women's doubles in 1980. Kiyomura was also a member of the winning team of the Wightman Cup competition in 1976 and 1979.

Kiyomura played in 1981 for the short-lived Oakland Breakers of World Team Tennis (WTT). Other WTT teams of hers included the San Francisco Golden Gaters (1975), Los Angeles Strings (1978 WTT Champions), Hawaii Leis (1974) and Indiana Loves (1976–1977). In 1976, she teamed with Ray Ruffels of the Loves to lead WTT in game-winning percentage in mixed doubles.

== Grand Slam finals ==
=== Doubles (1 title, 1 runner-up) ===
Result	Year	Championship	Surface	Partner	Opponents	Score
Win	1975	Wimbledon	Grass	(Japan) Kazuko Sawamatsu	(France) Françoise Dürr (Netherlands) Betty Stöve	7–5, 1–6, 7–5
Loss	1980	Australian Open	Grass	(United States) Candy Reynolds	(United States) Betsy Nagelsen (United States) Martina Navratilova	4–6, 4–6

== WTA Tour finals ==
=== Doubles: 33 (16–17) ===
Result	W-L	Date	Tournament	Surface	Partner	Opponents	Score
Win	1–0	Nov 1976	Tokyo, Japan	Carpet (i)	(United Kingdom) Sue Barker	(United States) Rosie Casals (France) Françoise Dürr	4–6, 6–3, 6–1
Loss	1–1	Jan 1977	Houston, US	Carpet (i)	(United Kingdom) Sue Barker	(Czechoslovakia) Martina Navratilova (Netherlands) Betty Stöve	6–4, 2–6, 1–6
Loss	1–2	Feb 1977	San Francisco, US	Carpet (i)	(United Kingdom) Sue Barker	(Australia) Kerry Reid (South Africa) Greer Stevens	3–6, 1–6
Loss	1–3	Feb 1979	Seattle, US	Carpet (i)	(United Kingdom) Sue Barker	(France) Françoise Dürr (Netherlands) Betty Stöve	6–7^{(4–7)}, 6–4, 4–6
Loss	1–4	Feb 1979	Detroit, US	Carpet (i)	(United Kingdom) Sue Barker	(Netherlands) Betty Stöve (Australia) Wendy Turnbull	4–6, 6–7^{(5–7)}
Loss	1–5	Mar 1979	Boston, US	Carpet (i)	(United Kingdom) Sue Barker	(Australia) Kerry Reid (Australia) Wendy Turnbull	4–6, 2–6
Loss	1–6	Mar 1979	Avon Championships	Carpet (i)	(United Kingdom) Sue Barker	(France) Françoise Dürr (Netherlands) Betty Stöve	6–7, 6–7
Loss	1–7	Apr 1979	Tokyo, Japan	Carpet (i)	(United Kingdom) Sue Barker	(France) Françoise Dürr (Netherlands) Betty Stöve	5–7, 6–7
Loss	1–8	Sep 1979	Atlanta, US	Carpet	(United States) Anne Smith	(Netherlands) Betty Stöve (Australia) Wendy Turnbull	2–6, 4–6
Win	2–8	Nov 1979	Brighton	Carpet	(United States) Anne Smith	(South Africa) Ilana Kloss (United States) Laura duPont	6–2, 6–1
Win	3–8	Feb 1980	Oakland, US	Carpet (i)	(United Kingdom) Sue Barker	(South Africa) Greer Stevens (United Kingdom) Virginia Wade	6–0, 6–4
Loss	3–9	Mar 1980	Tokyo, Japan	Carpet (i)	(United Kingdom) Sue Barker	(United States) Billie Jean King (Czechoslovakia) Martina Navratilova	5–7, 3–6
Win	4–9	Jul 1980	San Diego, US	Hard	(United States) Tracy Austin	(United States) Rosie Casals (Australia) Wendy Turnbull	3–6, 6–4, 6–3
Win	5–9	Oct 1980	U.S. Indoors	Carpet (i)	(United States) Candy Reynolds	(United States) Paula Smith (United States) Anne Smith	6–3, 4–6, 6–1
Loss	5–10	Oct 1980	Phoenix, US	Hard	(United States) Candy Reynolds	(United States) Pam Shriver (United States) Paula Smith	0–6, 4–6
Loss	5–11	Nov 1980	Australian Open	Grass	(United States) Candy Reynolds	(United States) Betsy Nagelsen (United States) Martina Navratilova	4–6, 4–6
Win	6–11	Feb 1981	Houston, US	Carpet (i)	(United Kingdom) Sue Barker	(Czechoslovakia) Regina Maršíková (United States) Mary-Lou Piatek	5–7, 6–3, 6–4
Loss	6–12	Feb 1981	Seattle, US	Carpet (i)	(United Kingdom) Sue Barker	(United States) Rosie Casals (Australia) Wendy Turnbull	4–6, 1–6
Win	7–12	Mar 1981	Los Angeles, US	Carpet (i)	(United Kingdom) Sue Barker	(United States) Peanut Louie (United States) Marita Redondo	6–1, 4–6, 6–1
Win	8–12	May 1981	Tokyo, Japan	Carpet (i)	(United Kingdom) Sue Barker	(United States) Barbara Potter (United States) Sharon Walsh	7–5, 6–2
Win	9–12	Jun 1981	Surbiton, UK	Grass	(United Kingdom) Sue Barker	(United States) Billie Jean King (South Africa) Ilana Kloss	6–1, 6–7, 6–1
Win	10–12	Aug 1981	Richmond, US	Carpet (i)	(United Kingdom) Sue Barker	(United States) Kathy Jordan (United States) Anne Smith	4–6, 7–6, 6–4
Win	11–12	Nov 1981	Hong Kong	Clay	(United States) Sharon Walsh	(United Kingdom) Anne Hobbs (Australia) Susan Leo	6–3, 6–4
Win	12–12	Jan 1982	Cincinnati, US	Carpet (i)	(United Kingdom) Sue Barker	(United States) Pam Shriver (United States) Anne Smith	6–2, 7–6
Win	13–12	Oct 1982	Tampa, US	Hard	(United States) Paula Smith	(United States) Mary-Lou Piatek (United States) Wendy White	6–2, 6–4
Win	14–12	Feb 1983	Palm Springs, US	Hard	(United States) Kathy Jordan	(Australia) Dianne Fromholtz (Netherlands) Betty Stöve	6–2, 6–2
Win	15–12	Mar 1983	Boston, US	Carpet (i)	(United Kingdom) Jo Durie	(United States) Kathy Jordan (United States) Anne Smith	6–3, 6–1
Loss	15–13	Oct 1983	Brighton, UK	Carpet (i)	(United Kingdom) Jo Durie	(United States) Chris Evert-Lloyd (United States) Pam Shriver	5–7, 4–6
Loss	15–14	Feb 1984	Livingston, US.	Carpet (i)	(United Kingdom) Jo Durie	(United States) Martina Navratilova (United States) Pam Shriver	4–6, 3–6
Loss	15–15	Feb 1984	VS Championships, US	Carpet (i)	(United Kingdom) Jo Durie	(United States) Martina Navratilova (United States) Pam Shriver	3–6, 1–6
Win	16–15	Mar 1984	Doubles Championship, Tokyo	Carpet (i)	(United States) Pam Shriver	(United States) Barbara Jordan (Australia) Elizabeth Smylie	6–3, 6–7^{(7–9)}, 6–3
Loss	16–16	Jun 1984	Eastbourne, UK	Grass	(United Kingdom) Jo Durie	(United States) Martina Navratilova (United States) Pam Shriver	4–6, 2–6
Loss	16–17	Aug 1984	Mahwah, US	Hard	(United Kingdom) Jo Durie	(United States) Martina Navratilova (United States) Pam Shriver	6–7^{(3–7)}, 6–3, 2–6
