= Larisa Neiland =

Latvian tennis player

Larisa Savchenko-Neiland
- Country (sports): Soviet Union; Latvia
- Residence: Jūrmala, Latvia
- Born: 21 July 1966 (age 60) Lviv, Ukrainian SSR, Soviet Union
- Height: 1.69 m (5 ft 6 1/2 in)
- Turned pro: 1983
- Retired: 2000
- Plays: Right-handed (one-handed backhand)
- Prize money: $4,083,936

Singles
- Career record: 322–283
- Career titles: 2
- Highest ranking: No. 13 (23 May 1988)

Grand Slam singles results
- Australian Open: 4R (1992)
- French Open: 3R (1984, 1989)
- Wimbledon: QF (1994)
- US Open: QF (1988)

Doubles
- Career record: 766–258
- Career titles: 65
- Highest ranking: No. 1 (27 January 1992)

Grand Slam doubles results
- Australian Open: SF (1995, 1996, 1997)
- French Open: W (1989)
- Wimbledon: W (1991)
- US Open: F (1991, 1992)

Other doubles tournaments
- Tour Finals: F (1988, 1989, 1992, 1993, 1999)

Mixed doubles
- Career titles: 4

Grand Slam mixed doubles results
- Australian Open: W (1994, 1996)
- French Open: W (1995)
- Wimbledon: W (1992)
- US Open: QF (1997)
Medal record
Women's tennis
Representing USSR
Friendship Games
Bronze medal – third place	1984	Women's doubles
Summer Universiade
Gold medal – first place	1985 Kobe	Women's singles
Gold medal – first place	1985 Kobe	Women's doubles
Silver medal – second place	1985 Kobe	Mixed doubles

Larisa Savchenko-Neiland (Ukrainian: Лариса Савченко-Нейланд, Latvian: Larisa Savčenko-Neilande; née Savchenko; also Larisa Neiland; born 21 July 1966) is a tennis coach and former professional player who represented the Soviet Union and Latvia. A former world No. 1 doubles player, Neiland won six Grand Slam titles: two in women's doubles and four in mixed doubles. She also won two singles titles and 63 doubles titles on the WTA Tour. She is listed in fourth place for the most doubles match wins (766) in WTA history, after Lisa Raymond, Rennae Stubbs and Liezel Huber. Neiland has been the coach of Ukrainian tennis player Daria Snigur since 2017.

== Career ==
Savchenko turned professional in 1983 as No. 10 on the ITF Junior rankings in that year. Doubles team of Savchenko and Svetlana Parkhomenko reached the Wimbledon quarterfinals in 1983 and 1984, both times as an unseeded pair; beat No. 2 seeds Fairbank/Reynolds in 1983 and No. 3 seeds Horvath/Ruzici in 1984. In 1984, Savchenko reached the third round of the French Open as a qualifier, which was her best singles result at the French Open. She won her first singles title in Chicago in January 1984, where she only lost one set.

Having 1986 wins over Wendy Turnbull (twice), Ann Henricksson, and Annabel Croft, Savchenko was ranked No. 1 in USSR for 1986. She qualified for the Virginia Slims Championships in March and November 1986 with partner Svetlana Parkhomenko. She defeated Kathy Rinaldi, Peanut Louie Harper, and Nathalie Tauziat to reach the quarterfinals of Eastbourne in 1986.

Savchenko jumped from No. 53 to No. 28 (June 1983) on the Hewlett-Packard/WITA Computer rankings after performances at Birmingham and Eastbourne. She also had wins over Robin White, Ann Henricksson, Candy Reynolds, and Melissa Gurney.

In 1988, Savchenko reached her first Grand Slam doubles final with Natasha Zvereva. They lost 10–12 in the final set to Gabriela Sabatini and Steffi Graf, who in that same year won all four Grand Slam singles titles and an Olympic gold medal. In 1989, again with Zvereva, Savchenko won her first doubles major final, over Graf and Sabatini in straight sets.

In December 1989, Larisa married Aleksandr Neiland and took his last name, she continued to compete as Larisa Savchenko-Neiland.

In 1991, she captured the Wimbledon title with Zvereva. She won her first mixed doubles title at Wimbledon, as well, when she and Cyril Suk teamed and won over Dutch duo Jacco Eltingh and Miriam Oremans. That year, she reached the No. 1 doubles ranking. Neiland then reached her next five doubles runners-up with Novotná. Each and every final played with Novotná was lost, the first being the US Open in 1991 and losing to Pam Shriver and Zvereva.

She also represented Latvia at the 1992 Summer Olympics in both singles and doubles, but lost in the first round in both events.

Her final Grand Slam doubles final appearance came in 1996 at Wimbledon. Neiland played in 2000 but retired after losing at Wimbledon. She lost in the first round, when she and her partner Lina Krasnoroutskaya lost to Ai Sugiyama and Julie Halard, the eventual runners-up, in straight sets.

Neiland tested positive for prohibited levels of the stimulant caffeine at the 1999 Australian Open. She was subsequently stripped of the $15k she had earned for reaching the women's doubles quarterfinals with Arantxa Sanchez Vicario, and issued a warning by the International Tennis Federation.

As a coach, she is best known for guiding Svetlana Kuznetsova to the 2009 French Open singles title, and has been a part of the Russian Fed Cup coaching team.

== Major finals ==
=== Grand Slam tournaments ===
==== Doubles: 12 (2 titles, 10 runner-ups) ====
Result	Year	Championship	Surface	Partner	Opponents	Score
Loss	1988	Wimbledon	Grass	(Soviet Union) Natasha Zvereva	(West Germany) Steffi Graf (Argentina) Gabriela Sabatini	3–6, 6–1, 10–12
Win	1989	French Open	Clay	(Soviet Union) Natasha Zvereva	(West Germany) Steffi Graf (Argentina) Gabriela Sabatini	6–4, 6–4
Loss	1989	Wimbledon (2)	Grass	(Soviet Union) Natasha Zvereva	(Czechoslovakia) Jana Novotná (Czechoslovakia) Helena Suková	1–6, 2–6
Loss	1990	French Open (2)	Clay	(Soviet Union) Natasha Zvereva	(Czechoslovakia) Jana Novotná (Czechoslovakia) Helena Suková	4–6, 5–7
Loss	1991	French Open (3)	Clay	(Soviet Union) Natasha Zvereva	(United States) Gigi Fernández (Czechoslovakia) Jana Novotná	4–6, 0–6
Win	1991	Wimbledon (3)	Grass	(Soviet Union) Natasha Zvereva	(Puerto Rico) Gigi Fernández (Czechoslovakia) Jana Novotná	6–4, 3–6, 6–4
Loss	1991	US Open	Hard	(Czechoslovakia) Jana Novotná	(United States) Pam Shriver (Belarus) Natasha Zvereva	4–6, 6–4, 6–7^{(5)}
Loss	1992	Wimbledon (4)	Grass	(Czechoslovakia) Jana Novotná	(United States) Gigi Fernández (Belarus) Natasha Zvereva	4–6, 1–6
Loss	1992	US Open (2)	Hard	(Czechoslovakia) Jana Novotná	(United States) Gigi Fernández (Belarus) Natasha Zvereva	6–7^{(5)}, 1–6
Loss	1993	French Open (4)	Clay	(Czech Republic) Jana Novotná	(United States) Gigi Fernández (Belarus) Natasha Zvereva	3–6, 5–7
Loss	1993	Wimbledon (5)	Grass	(Czech Republic) Jana Novotná	(United States) Gigi Fernández (Belarus) Natasha Zvereva	4–6, 7–6^{(7)}, 4–6
Loss	1996	Wimbledon (6)	Grass	(United States) Meredith McGrath	(Switzerland) Martina Hingis (Czech Republic) Helena Suková	7–5, 5–7, 1–6

==== Mixed doubles: 9 (4 titles, 5 runner-ups) ====
Result	Year	Championship	Surface	Partner	Opponents	Score
Win	1992	Wimbledon	Grass	(Czechoslovakia) Cyril Suk	(Netherlands) Miriam Oremans (Netherlands) Jacco Eltingh	7–6^{(2)}, 6–2
Win	1994	Australian Open	Hard	(Russia) Andrei Olhovskiy	(Czech Republic) Helena Suková (Australia) Todd Woodbridge	7–5, 6–7^{(0)}, 6–2
Loss	1994	French Open	Clay	(Russia) Andrei Olhovskiy	(Netherlands) Kristie Boogert (Netherlands) Menno Oosting	5–7, 6–3, 5–7
Win	1995	French Open (2)	Clay	(Australia) Mark Woodforde	(Canada) Jill Hetherington (South Africa) John-Laffnie de Jager	7–6^{(8)}, 7–6^{(4)}
Win	1996	Australian Open (2)	Hard	(Australia) Mark Woodforde	(United States) Nicole Arendt (United States) Luke Jensen	4–6, 7–5, 6–0
Loss	1996	Wimbledon (2)	Grass	(Australia) Mark Woodforde	(Czech Republic) Helena Suková (Czechoslovakia) Cyril Suk	6–1, 3–6, 2–6
Loss	1997	Australian Open (3)	Hard	(South Africa) John-Laffnie de Jager	(Netherlands) Manon Bollegraf (United States) Rick Leach	3–6, 7–6^{(5)}, 5–7
Loss	1997	Wimbledon (3)	Grass	(Russia) Andrei Olhovskiy	(Czech Republic) Helena Suková (Czechoslovakia) Cyril Suk	6–4, 3–6, 4–6
Loss	1999	French Open (3)	Clay	(United States) Rick Leach	(Slovenia) Katarina Srebotnik (South Africa) Piet Norval	3–6, 6–3, 3–6

=== Year-end championships ===
==== Doubles: 5 (5 runner-ups) ====
Result	Year	Championship	Surface	Partner	Opponents	Score
Loss	1988	New York	Carpet (i)	(Soviet Union) Natasha Zvereva	(United States) Martina Navratilova (United States) Pam Shriver	3–6, 4–6
Loss	1989	New York (2)	Carpet (i)	(Soviet Union) Natasha Zvereva	(United States) Martina Navratilova (United States) Pam Shriver	3–6, 2–6
Loss	1992	New York (3)	Carpet (i)	(Czechoslovakia) Jana Novotná	(Spain) Arantxa Sánchez Vicario (Czechoslovakia) Helena Suková	6–7^{(4)}, 1–6
Loss	1993	New York (4)	Carpet (i)	(Czech Republic) Jana Novotná	(Belarus) Natasha Zvereva (United States) Gigi Fernández	3–6, 5–7
Loss	1999	New York (5)	Carpet (i)	(Spain) Arantxa Sánchez Vicario	(Switzerland) Martina Hingis (Russia) Anna Kournikova	4–6, 4–6

== WTA career finals ==
=== Singles: 9 (2 titles, 7 runner-ups) ===
Legend Tier I (0–1) Tier II (0–0) Tier III (1–4) Tier IV (0–0) Tier V (1–0) Virginia Slims (0–2)	Finals by surface Hard (1–1) Grass (0–1) Clay (0–0) Carpet (1–5)

Result	W/L	Date	Tournament	Surface	Opponent	Score
Loss	0–1	Jan 1987	Wichita Open, U.S.	Carpet (i)	(United States) Barbara Potter	6–7^{(6–8)}, 6–7^{(5–7)}
Loss	0–2	Jun 1987	Birmingham Classic, UK	Grass	(United States) Pam Shriver	6–4, 2–6, 2–6
Loss	0–3	Feb 1988	Oakland Classic, U.S.	Carpet (i)	(United States) Martina Navratilova	1–6, 2–6
Loss	0–4	Feb 1989	Oakland Classic (2)	Carpet (i)	(United States) Zina Garrison	1–6, 1–6
Loss	0–5	Nov 1989	Chicago Cup, U.S.	Carpet (i)	(United States) Zina Garrison	3–6, 6–2, 4–6
Win	1–5	Sep 1991	St. Petersburg Open, Russia	Carpet (i)	(Germany) Barbara Rittner	3–6, 6–3, 6–4
Loss	1–6	Feb 1993	Pan Pacific Open, Japan	Carpet (i)	(United States) Martina Navratilova	2–6, 2–6
Win	2–6	Aug 1993	Schenectady Open, U.S.	Hard	(Ukraine) Natalia Medvedeva	6–3, 7–5
Loss	2–7	Aug 1994	Schenectady Open, U.S. (2)	Hard	(Austria) Judith Wiesner	5–7, 6–3, 4–6

=== Doubles: 123 (65 titles, 58 runner-ups) ===
Result	W/L	Date	Tournament	Surface	Partner	Opponents	Score
Loss	0–1	Jan 1985	Key Biscayne, US	Hard	(Soviet Union) Svetlana Parkhomenko	(United States) Kathy Jordan (Australia) Elizabeth Smylie	4–6, 6–7
Win	1–1	Apr 1985	Seabrook Island, US	Clay	(Soviet Union) Svetlana Parkhomenko	(United States) Elise Burgin (United States) Lori McNeil	6–1, 6–3
Loss	1–2	Apr 1985	Hilton Head, US	Clay	(Soviet Union) Svetlana Parkhomenko	(South Africa) Rosalyn Fairbank (United States) Pam Shriver	4–6, 1–6
Win	2–2	Sep 1985	Salt Lake City, U.S.	Hard	(Soviet Union) Svetlana Parkhomenko	(South Africa) Beverly Mould (South Africa) Rosalyn Fairbank	7–5, 6–2
Loss	2–3	Sep 1986	Tulsa, US	Hard	(Soviet Union) Svetlana Parkhomenko	(United States) Camille Benjamin (South Africa) Dinky Van Rensburg	6–7, 5–7
Loss	2–4	Sep 1986	New Orleans, US	Hard	(Soviet Union) Svetlana Parkhomenko	(United States) Candy Reynolds (United States) Anne Smith	3–6, 6–3, 3–6
Win	3–4	Nov 1986	Little Rock, US	Carpet (i)	(Soviet Union) Svetlana Parkhomenko	(Czechoslovakia) Iva Budařová (United States) Beth Herr	6–2, 1–6, 6–1
Win	4–4	Jan 1987	Wichita, US	Carpet (i)	(Soviet Union) Svetlana Parkhomenko	(United States) Barbara Potter (United States) Wendy White	6–2, 6–4
Win	5–4	Feb 1987	Oklahoma City, US	Hard	(Soviet Union) Svetlana Parkhomenko	(United States) Lori McNeil (United States) Kim Sands	6–4, 6–4
Win	6–4	Feb 1987	Boca Raton, US	Hard	(Soviet Union) Svetlana Parkhomenko	(United States) Chris Evert (United States) Pam Shriver	6–0, 3–6, 6–2
Win	7–4	Jun 1987	Eastbourne, UK	Grass	(Soviet Union) Svetlana Parkhomenko	(South Africa) Rosalyn Fairbank (Australia) Elizabeth Smylie	7–6^{(7–5)}, 4–6, 7–5
Win	8–4	Jun 1988	Birmingham, UK	Grass	(Soviet Union) Natasha Zvereva	(Soviet Union) Leila Meskhi (Soviet Union) Svetlana Parkhomenko	6–4, 6–1
Loss	8–5	Jul 1988	Wimbledon	Grass	(Soviet Union) Natasha Zvereva	(West Germany) Steffi Graf (Argentina) Gabriela Sabatini	3–6, 6–1, 10–12
Win	9–5	Oct 1988	Indianapolis, US	Hard (i)	(Soviet Union) Natasha Zvereva	(United States) Katrina Adams (United States) Zina Garrison	6–2, 6–1
Loss	9–6	Nov 1988	Chicago, US	Carpet (i)	(Soviet Union) Natasha Zvereva	(United States) Lori McNeil (United States) Betsy Nagelsen	4–6, 6–3, 4–6
Loss	9–7	Nov 1988	VS Championships, New York	Carpet (i)	(Soviet Union) Natasha Zvereva	(United States) Martina Navratilova (United States) Pam Shriver	3–6, 4–6
Loss	9–8	Feb 1989	Washington, US	Carpet (i)	(Soviet Union) Natasha Zvereva	(United States) Betsy Nagelsen (United States) Pam Shriver	2–6, 3–6
Loss	9–9	Feb 1989	Stanford, US	Carpet (i)	(Soviet Union) Natasha Zvereva	(United States) Patty Fendick (Canada) Jill Hetherington	5–7, 6–3, 2–6
Win	10–9	Apr 1989	Amelia Island, US	Clay	(Soviet Union) Natasha Zvereva	(United States) Martina Navratilova (United States) Pam Shriver	7–6^{(7–4)}, 2–6, 6–1
Loss	10–10	May 1989	Geneva, Switzerland	Clay	(Soviet Union) Natasha Zvereva	(United States) Katrina Adams (United States) Lori McNeil	6–2, 3–6, 4–6
Win	11–10	May 1989	French Open, Paris	Clay	(Soviet Union) Natasha Zvereva	(West Germany) Steffi Graf (Argentina) Gabriela Sabatini	6–4, 6–4
Win	12–10	Jun 1989	Birmingham, UK	Grass	(Soviet Union) Natasha Zvereva	(United States) Meredith McGrath (United States) Pam Shriver	7–5, 5–7, 6–0
Loss	12–11	Jun 1989	Wimbledon	Grass	(Soviet Union) Natasha Zvereva	(Czechoslovakia) Jana Novotná (Czechoslovakia) Helena Suková	1–6, 2–6
Loss	12–12	Aug 1989	Toronto, Canada	Hard	(United States) Martina Navratilova	(United States) Gigi Fernández (United States) Robin White	1–6, 5–7
Win	13–12	Oct 1989	Moscow, Soviet Union	Carpet (i)	(Soviet Union) Natasha Zvereva	(France) Nathalie Herreman (France) Catherine Suire	6–3, 6–4
Loss	13–13	Nov 1989	Indianapolis, US	Hard	(Germany) Claudia Porwik	(United States) Katrina Adams (United States) Lori McNeil	4–6, 4–6
Win	14–13	Nov 1989	Chicago, US	Carpet (i)	(Soviet Union) Natasha Zvereva	(Czechoslovakia) Jana Novotná (Czechoslovakia) Helena Suková	6–3, 2–6, 6–3
Loss	14–14	Nov 1989	VS Championships, New York	Carpet (i)	(Soviet Union) Natasha Zvereva	(United States) Martina Navratilova (United States) Pam Shriver	3–6, 2–6
Loss	14–15	Jan 1990	Sydney, Australia	Hard	(Soviet Union) Natasha Zvereva	(Czechoslovakia) Jana Novotná (Czechoslovakia) Helena Suková	3–6, 5–7
Loss	14–16	Apr 1990	Hamburg, Germany	Clay	(Czechoslovakia) Helena Suková	(United States) Gigi Fernández (United States) Martina Navratilova	2–6, 3–6
Loss	14–17	May 1990	French Open	Clay	(Soviet Union) Natasha Zvereva	(Czechoslovakia) Jana Novotná (Czechoslovakia) Helena Suková	4–6, 5–7
Win	15–17	Jun 1990	Birmingham, UK	Grass	(Soviet Union) Natasha Zvereva	(South Africa) Lise Gregory (United States) Gretchen Magers	3–6, 6–3, 6–3
Win	16–17	Jun 1990	Eastbourne, UK	Grass	(Soviet Union) Natasha Zvereva	(United States) Patty Fendick (United States) Zina Garrison	6–4, 6–3
Win	17–17	Sep 1990	WTA Championships, Orlando	Carpet (i)	(Soviet Union) Natasha Zvereva	(Netherlands) Manon Bollegraf (United States) Meredith McGrath	6–4, 6–1
Win	18–17	Oct 1990	Nashville, US	Hard (i)	(United States) Kathy Jordan	(Netherlands) Brenda Schultz (Netherlands) Caroline Vis	6–1, 6–2
Win	19–17	Jan 1991	Auckland, New Zealand	Hard	(United States) Patty Fendick	(Australia) Jo-Anne Faull (Australia) Julie Richardson	6–3, 6–3
Win	20–17	Mar 1991	Boca Raton, US	Hard	(Soviet Union) Natasha Zvereva	(United States) Meredith McGrath (United States) Anne Smith	6–4, 7–6^{(7–3)}
Loss	20–18	Mar 1991	Tarpon Springs, US	Clay	(Soviet Union) Natasha Zvereva	(United States) Gigi Fernández (Czechoslovakia) Helena Suková	6–4, 4–6, 6–7^{(3–7)}
Win	21–18	Apr 1991	Hamburg, Germany	Clay	(Czechoslovakia) Jana Novotná	(Spain) Arantxa Sánchez Vicario (Czech Republic) Helena Suková	7–5, 6–1
Win	22–18	May 1991	Berlin, Germany	Clay	(Soviet Union) Natasha Zvereva	(Australia) Nicole Provis (South Africa) Elna Reinach	6–3, 6–3
Loss	22–19	May 1991	French Open	Clay	(Soviet Union) Natasha Zvereva	(United States) Gigi Fernández (Czechoslovakia) Jana Novotná	4–6, 0–6
Win	23–19	Jun 1991	Eastbourne, UK	Grass	(Soviet Union) Natasha Zvereva	(United States) Gigi Fernández (Czechoslovakia) Jana Novotná	2–6, 6–4, 6–4
Win	24–19	Jun 1991	Wimbledon	Grass	(Soviet Union) Natasha Zvereva	(United States) Gigi Fernández (Czechoslovakia) Jana Novotná	6–4, 3–6, 6–4
Win	25–19	Aug 1991	Toronto, Canada	Hard	(Soviet Union) Natasha Zvereva	(Germany) Claudia Kohde-Kilsch (Czechoslovakia) Helena Suková	1–6, 7–5, 6–2
Win	26–19	Aug 1991	Manhattan Beach, US	Hard	(Soviet Union) Natasha Zvereva	(United States) Gretchen Magers (United States) Robin White	6–1, 2–6, 6–2
Win	27–19	Aug 1991	Washington, D.C., US	Hard	(Czechoslovakia) Jana Novotná	(United States) Gigi Fernández (Soviet Union) Natasha Zvereva	5–7, 6–1, 7–6^{(12–10)}
Loss	27–20	Aug 1991	US Open	Hard	(Czechoslovakia) Jana Novotná	(United States) Pam Shriver (Belarus) Natasha Zvereva	4–6, 6–4, 6–7^{(5–7)}
Win	28–20	Nov 1991	Philadelphia, US	Carpet	(Czechoslovakia) Jana Novotná	(United States) Mary Joe Fernández (United States) Zina Garrison	6–2, 6–4
Win	29–20	Jan 1992	Brisbane, Australia	Hard	(Czechoslovakia) Jana Novotná	(Netherlands) Manon Bollegraf (Australia) Nicole Bradtke	6–4, 6–3
Win	30–20	Mar 1992	Boca Raton, US	Hard	(Commonwealth of Independent States) Natasha Zvereva	(Spain) Conchita Martínez (United States) Linda Wild	6–2, 6–2
Win	31–20	Mar 1992	Key Biscayne, US	Hard	(Spain) Arantxa Sánchez Vicario	(Canada) Jill Hetherington (United States) Kathy Rinaldi	7–5, 5–7, 6–3
Win	32–20	Mar 1992	Wesley Chapel, US	Clay	(Czechoslovakia) Jana Novotná	(Spain) Arantxa Sánchez Vicario (Belarus) Natasha Zvereva	6–4, 6–2
Loss	32–21	Mar 1992	Hilton Head, US	Clay	(Czechoslovakia) Jana Novotná	(Spain) Arantxa Sánchez Vicario (Belarus) Natasha Zvereva	4–6, 2–6
Win	33–21	May 1992	Berlin, Germany	Clay	(Czechoslovakia) Jana Novotná	(United States) Gigi Fernández (Belarus) Natasha Zvereva	7–6^{(7–5)}, 4–6, 7–5
Win	34–21	Jun 1992	Eastbourne, UK	Grass	(Czechoslovakia) Jana Novotná	(United States) Mary Joe Fernández (United States) Zina Garrison	6–0, 6–3
Loss	34–22	Jul 1992	Wimbledon	Grass	(Czechoslovakia) Jana Novotná	(United States) Gigi Fernández (Belarus) Natasha Zvereva	4–6, 1–6
Win	35–22	Aug 1992	San Diego, US	Hard	(Czechoslovakia) Jana Novotná	(Spain) Conchita Martínez (Argentina) Mercedes Paz	6–1, 6–4
Loss	35–23	Aug 1992	US Open	Hard	(Czechoslovakia) Jana Novotná	(United States) Gigi Fernández (Belarus) Natasha Zvereva	6–7^{(4–7)}, 1–6
Win	36–23	Sep 1992	Leipzig, Germany	Carpet (i)	(Czechoslovakia) Jana Novotná	(United States) Patty Fendick (Czech Republic) Andrea Strnadová	7–5, 7–6^{(7–4)}
Win	37–23	Oct 1992	Brighton, UK	Carpet (i)	(Czechoslovakia) Jana Novotná	(Spain) Conchita Martínez (Czech Republic) Radka Zrubáková	6–4, 6–1
Loss	37–24	Nov 1992	WTA Championships, US	Carpet (i)	(Czech Republic) Jana Novotná	(Spain) Arantxa Sánchez Vicario (Czech Republic) Helena Suková	6–7^{(4–7)}, 1–6
Win	38–24	Jan 1993	Brisbane, Australia	Hard	(Spain) Conchita Martínez	(United States) Kimberly Po (United States) Shannan McCarthy	6–2, 6–2
Win	39–24	Feb 1993	Osaka, Japan	Carpet (i)	(Czechoslovakia) Jana Novotná	(Bulgaria) Magdalena Maleeva (Switzerland) Manuela Maleeva-Fragniere	6–1, 6–3
Loss	39–25	Mar 1993	Delray Beach, US	Hard	(Czechoslovakia) Jana Novotná	(United States) Gigi Fernández (Belarus) Natasha Zvereva	2–6, 2–6
Win	40–25	Mar 1993	Key Biscayne, US	Hard	(Czechoslovakia) Jana Novotná	(Canada) Jill Hetherington (United States) Kathy Rinaldi	6–2, 7–5
Loss	40–26	Mar 1993	Wesley Chapel, US	Clay	(Spain) Arantxa Sánchez Vicario	(United States) Gigi Fernández (Belarus) Natasha Zvereva	5–7, 3–6
Loss	40–27	Apr 1993	Hamburg, Germany	Clay	(Czechoslovakia) Jana Novotná	(Germany) Steffi Graf (Australia) Rennae Stubbs	4–6, 6–7^{(5–7)}
Loss	40–28	May 1993	French Open	Clay	(Czechoslovakia) Jana Novotná	(United States) Gigi Fernández (Belarus) Natasha Zvereva	3–6, 5–7
Loss	40–29	Jun 1993	Eastbourne, UK	Grass	(Czechoslovakia) Jana Novotná	(United States) Gigi Fernández (Belarus) Natasha Zvereva	6–2, 5–7, 1–6
Loss	40–30	Jun 1993	Wimbledon	Grass	(Czechoslovakia) Jana Novotná	(United States) Gigi Fernández (Belarus) Natasha Zvereva	4–6, 7–6^{(11–9)}, 4–6
Win	41–30	Aug 1993	Toronto, Canada	Hard	(Czechoslovakia) Jana Novotná	(Spain) Arantxa Sánchez Vicario (Czech Republic) Helena Suková	6–1, 6–2
Loss	41–31	Sep 1993	Leipzig, Germany	Carpet (i)	(Czechoslovakia) Jana Novotná	(United States) Gigi Fernández (Belarus) Natasha Zvereva	3–6, 2–6
Loss	41–32	Oct 1993	Brighton, UK	Carpet (i)	(Germany) Anke Huber	(Italy) Laura Golarsa (Ukraine) Natalia Medvedeva	3–6, 6–1, 4–6
Loss	41–33	Nov 1993	Philadelphia, US	Carpet (i)	(Spain) Conchita Martínez	(Netherlands) Manon Bollegraf (United States) Katrina Adams	6–2, 4–6, 7–6^{(9–7)}
Loss	41–34	Nov 1993	New York, US	Carpet (i)	(Czechoslovakia) Jana Novotná	(United States) Gigi Fernández (Belarus) Natasha Zvereva	6–3, 7–5
Win	42–34	Feb 1994	Osaka, Japan	Carpet	(Australia) Rennae Stubbs	(United States) Pam Shriver (Australia) Elizabeth Smylie	6–4, 6–7^{(2)}, 7–5
Win	43–34	Apr 1994	Amelia Island, US	Clay	(Spain) Arantxa Sánchez Vicario	(South Africa) Amanda Coetzer (Argentina) Inés Gorrochategui	6–2, 6–7^{(6–8)}, 6–4
Win	44–34	Apr 1994	Barcelona, Spain	Clay	(Spain) Arantxa Sánchez Vicario	(France) Julie Halard (France) Nathalie Tauziat	6–2, 6–4
Win	45–34	Jun 1994	Birmingham, UK	Grass	(United States) Zina Garrison	(Australia) Catherine Barclay (Australia) Kerry-Anne Guse	6–4, 6–4
Win	46–34	Aug 1994	Schenectady, US	Hard	(United States) Meredith McGrath	(United States) Pam Shriver (Australia) Liz Smylie	6–2, 6–2
Loss	46–35	Oct 1994	Leipzig, Germany	Carpet	(Netherlands) Manon Bollegraf	(United States) Patty Fendick (United States) Meredith McGrath	4–6, 4–6
Loss	46–36	Oct 1994	Filderstadt, Germany	Hard (i)	(Netherlands) Manon Bollegraf	(United States) Gigi Fernández (Belarus) Natalia Zvereva	6–7^{(5–7)}, 4–6
Win	47–36	Oct 1994	Brighton, UK	Carpet	(Netherlands) Manon Bollegraf	(United States) Mary Joe Fernández (Czech Republic) Jana Novotná	4–6, 6–2, 6–3
Loss	47–37	Jan 1995	Hobart, Australia	Hard	(Netherlands) Manon Bollegraf	(Japan) Kyoko Nagatsuka (Japan) Ai Sugiyama	6–2, 4–6, 2–6
Win	48–37	Feb 1995	Paris, France	Hard (i)	(United States) Meredith McGrath	(Netherlands) Manon Bollegraf (Australia) Rennae Stubbs	6–4, 6–1
Loss	48–38	Feb 1995	Indian Wells	Hard	(Spain) Arantxa Sánchez Vicario	(United States) Lindsay Davenport (United States) Lisa Raymond	6–2, 4–6, 3–6
Loss	48–39	Mar 1995	Delray Beach, US	Hard	(United States) Lori McNeil	(United States) Mary Joe Fernández (Czech Republic) Jana Novotná	4–6, 0–6
Win	49–39	Apr 1995	Barcelona, Spain	Clay	(Spain) Arantxa Sánchez Vicario	(South Africa) Mariaan de Swardt (Croatia) Iva Majoli	7–5, 4–6, 7–5
Loss	49–40	May 1995	Berlin, Germany	Clay	(Argentina) Gabriela Sabatini	(South Africa) Amanda Coetzer (Argentina) Inés Gorrochategui	6–4, 6–7^{(3–7)}, 2–6
Win	50–40	May 1995	Edinburgh, UK	Clay	(United States) Meredith McGrath	(Netherlands) Manon Bollegraf (Australia) Rennae Stubbs	6–2, 7–6^{(7–2)}
Loss	50–41	Aug 1995	Manhattan Beach, US	Hard	(Argentina) Gabriela Sabatini	(United States) Gigi Fernández (Belarus) Natasha Zvereva	5–7, 7–6^{(7–2)}, 5–7
Win	51–41	Sep 1995	Moscow, Russia	Carpet (i)	(United States) Meredith McGrath	(Russia) Anna Kournikova (Poland) Aleksandra Olsza	6–1, 6–1
Win	52–41	Oct 1995	Leipzig, Germany	Carpet (i)	(United States) Meredith McGrath	(Netherlands) Brenda Schultz-McCarthy (Netherlands) Caroline Vis	6–4, 6–4
Loss	52–42	Oct 1995	Filderstadt, Germany	Hard (i)	(United States) Meredith McGrath	(United States) Gigi Fernández (Belarus) Natalia Zvereva	7–5, 1–6, 4–6
Win	53–42	Oct 1995	Brighton, England	Carpet (i)	(United States) Meredith McGrath	(United States) Lori McNeil (Czech Republic) Helena Suková	7–5, 6–1
Loss	53–43	Nov 1995	Philadelphia, U.S.	Carpet (i)	(United States) Meredith McGrath	(United States) Lori McNeil (Czech Republic) Helena Suková	6–4, 3–6, 4–6
Win	54–43	Feb 1996	Essen, Germany	Carpet (i)	(United States) Meredith McGrath	(United States) Lori McNeil (Czech Republic) Helena Suková	6–4, 3–6, 4–6
Loss	54–44	Mar 1996	Key Biscayne, US	Hard	(United States) Meredith McGrath	(Czech Republic) Jana Novotná (Spain) Arantxa Sánchez Vicario	4–6, 4–6
Loss	54–45	Apr 1996	Amelia Island, U.S.	Clay	(United States) Meredith McGrath	(United States) Chanda Rubin (Spain) Arantxa Sánchez Vicario	4–6, 4–6
Win	55–45	May 1996	Berlin, Germany	Clay	(United States) Meredith McGrath	(Switzerland) Martina Hingis (Czech Republic) Helena Suková	6–1, 5–7, 7–6
Win	56–45	Jun 1996	Rosmalen, Netherlands	Grass	(Netherlands) Brenda Schultz-McCarthy	(Netherlands) Kristie Boogert (Czech Republic) Helena Suková	6–4, 7–6^{(9–7)}
Loss	56–46	Jul 1996	Wimbledon	Grass	(United States) Meredith McGrath	(Switzerland) Martina Hingis (Czech Republic) Helena Suková	7–5, 5–7, 1–6
Win	57–46	Aug 1996	Montreal, Canada	Hard	(Spain) Arantxa Sánchez Vicario	(United States) Mary Joe Fernández (Czech Republic) Helena Suková	7–6^{(7–1)}, 6–1
Loss	57–47	Aug 1996	San Diego, US	Hard	(Spain) Arantxa Sánchez Vicario	(United States) Gigi Fernández (Spain) Conchita Martínez	6–4, 3–6, 4–6
Win	58–47	Nov 1996	Moscow, Russia	Carpet (i)	(Ukraine) Natalia Medvedeva	(Italy) Silvia Farina (Austria) Barbara Schett	7–6^{(7–5)}, 4–6, 6–1
Loss	58–48	Feb 1997	Hannover, Germany	Carpet (i)	(Netherlands) Brenda Schultz-McCarthy	(United States) Nicole Arendt (Netherlands) Manon Bollegraf	6–4, 3–6, 6–7^{(4–7)}
Win	59–48	Jun 1997	Birmingham, UK	Grass	(United States) Katrina Adams	(France) Nathalie Tauziat (United States) Linda Wild	6–2, 6–3
Loss	59–49	Aug 1997	Manhattan Beach, US	Hard	(Czech Republic) Helena Suková	(Indonesia) Yayuk Basuki (Netherlands) Caroline Vis	6–7^{(7–9)}, 3–6
Loss	59–50	Oct 1997	Zürich, Switzerland	Carpet	(Czech Republic) Helena Suková	(Switzerland) Martina Hingis (Spain) Arantxa Sánchez Vicario	6–4, 4–6, 1–6
Win	60–50	Oct 1997	Kockelscheuer, Luxembourg	Carpet (i)	(Czech Republic) Helena Suková	(Germany) Meike Babel (Belgium) Laurence Courtois	6–2, 6–4
Loss	60–51	Feb 1998	Paris, France	Hard	(Russia) Anna Kournikova	(Belgium) Sabine Appelmans (Netherlands) Miriam Oremans	1–6, 6–3, 6–7^{(3–7)}
Loss	60–52	Mar 1998	Linz, Austria	Hard	(Russia) Anna Kournikova	(France) Alexandra Fusai (France) Nathalie Tauziat	3–6, 6–3, 4–6
Loss	60–53	Aug 1998	Stanford, US	Hard	(Ukraine) Elena Tatarkova	(United States) Lindsay Davenport (Belarus) Natalia Zvereva	4–6, 4–6
Loss	60–54	Oct 1998	Kockelscheuer, Luxembourg	Carpet (i)	(Ukraine) Elena Tatarkova	(Russia) Elena Likhovtseva (Japan) Ai Sugiyama	7–6^{(7–3)}, 3–6, 0–2 ret.
Win	61–54	Jan 1999	Gold Coast, Australia	Hard	(United States) Corina Morariu	(Australia) Kristine Kunce (Romania) Irina Spîrlea	6–3, 6–3
Win	62–54	Apr 1999	Hamburg, Germany	Clay	(Spain) Arantxa Sánchez Vicario	(South Africa) Amanda Coetzer (Czech Republic) Jana Novotná	6–2, 6–1
Win	63–54	Jun 1999	Birmingham, UK	Grass	(United States) Corina Morariu	(Argentina) Inés Gorrochategui (France) Alexandra Fusai	6–4, 6–4
Win	64–54	Aug 1999	Manhattan Beach, US	Hard	(Spain) Arantxa Sánchez Vicario	(United States) Lisa Raymond (Australia) Rennae Stubbs	6–2, 6–7^{(5–7)}, 6–0
Loss	64–55	Aug 1999	Toronto, Canada	Hard	(Spain) Arantxa Sánchez Vicario	(Czech Republic) Jana Novotná (France) Mary Pierce	3–6, 6–2, 3–6
Loss	64–56	Oct 1999	Filderstadt, Germany	Carpet (i)	(Spain) Arantxa Sánchez Vicario	(United States) Chanda Rubin (France) Sandrine Testud	3–6, 4–6
Loss	64–57	Oct 1999	Linz, Austria	Carpet (i)	(Slovenia) Tina Križan	(Romania) Irina Spîrlea (Netherlands) Caroline Vis	4–6, 3–6
Win	65–57	Nov 1999	Leipzig, Germany	Carpet (i)	(France) Mary Pierce	(Russia) Elena Likhovtseva (Japan) Ai Sugiyama	6–4, 6–3
Loss	65–58	Nov 1999	New York, US	Carpet	(Spain) Arantxa Sánchez Vicario	(Switzerland) Martina Hingis (Russia) Anna Kournikova	4–6, 4–6

== ITF finals ==
=== Singles (2–0) ===
Legend
$75,000 tournaments
$10,000 tournaments

Result	No.	Date	Tournament	Surface	Opponent	Score
Win	1.	2 January 1984	ITF Chicago, United States	Hard	(Soviet Union) Natasha Reva	6–2, 6–4
Win	2.	9 April 1984	ITF Caserta, Italy	Clay	(Soviet Union) Elena Eliseenko	6–2, 6–1

=== Doubles (3–1) ===
Result	No.	Date	Tournament	Surface	Partner	Opponents	Score
Loss	1.	2 January 1984	ITF Chicago, United States	Hard	(Soviet Union) Svetlana Parkhomenko	(Switzerland) Csilla Bartos-Cserepy (Netherlands) Marianne van der Torre	w/o
Win	2.	9 April 1984	ITF Caserta, Italy	Clay	(Socialist Federal Republic of Yugoslavia) Renata Šašak	(Czechoslovakia) Marie Pinterová (Czechoslovakia) Renáta Tomanová	6–1, 6–3
Win	3.	13 September 1993	ITF Karlovy Vary, Czech Republic	Clay	(Slovakia) Karina Habšudová	(Czech Republic) Radka Bobková (Czech Republic) Petra Langrová	6–3, 6–4
Win	4.	28 September 1996	ITF Limoges, France	Hard (i)	(Ukraine) Natalia Medvedeva	(France) Caroline Dhenin (Belgium) Dominique Monami	6–1, 6–1

== Women's doubles performance timeline ==
Key
W	F	SF	QF	#R	RR	Q#	P#	DNQ	A	Z#	PO	G	S	B	NMS	NTI	P	NH

(W) winner; (F) finalist; (SF) semifinalist; (QF) quarterfinalist; (#R) rounds 4, 3, 2, 1; (RR) round-robin stage; (Q#) qualification round; (P#) preliminary round; (DNQ) did not qualify; (A) absent; (Z#) Davis/Fed Cup Zonal Group (with number indication) or (PO) play-off; (G) gold, (S) silver or (B) bronze Olympic/Paralympic medal; (NMS) not a Masters tournament; (NTI) not a Tier I tournament; (P) postponed; (NH) not held; (SR) strike rate (events won / competed); (W–L) win–loss record.

Tournament	1983	1984	1985	1986	1987	1988	1989	1990	1991	1992	1993	1994	1995	1996	1997	1998	1999	2000	SR	W–L
Grand Slam tournaments
Australian Open	A	2R	A	NH	A	A	A	QF	QF	QF	QF	3R	SF	SF	SF	2R	QF	A	0 / 11	31–11
French Open	A	1R	2R	QF	A	A	W	F	F	SF	F	QF	3R	SF	QF	SF	QF	1R	1 / 15	48–14
Wimbledon	QF	QF	QF	1R	SF	F	F	SF	W	F	F	QF	SF	F	SF	A	3R	1R	1 / 17	61–16
US Open	2R	A	A	A	1R	2R	QF	SF	F	F	2R	SF	3R	A	3R	2R	SF	A	0 / 13	33–13
Win–loss	4–2	4–3	4–2	3–2	4–2	6–2	14–2	16–4	19–3	17–4	14–4	12–4	12–4	13–3	13–4	6–3	12–4	0–2	2 / 56	173–54
Year-end championships
Tour Championships	A	A	A	QF	QF	F	F	QF	QF	F	F	A	SF	SF	SF	QF	F	A	0 / 13	13–13
Tier I tournaments
Tokyo	NH	Not Tier I									SF	1R	QF	A	A	A	1R	A	0 / 4	3–4
Indian Wells	Not Held						Not Tier I								2R	QF	A	A	0 / 2	2–2
Boca Raton	NH	Not Tier I							W	W	Not Tier I			Not Held					2 / 2	8–0
Miami	Not Held		Not Tier I					QF	3R	W	W	QF	SF	F	3R	QF	QF	2R	2 / 11	27–9
Charleston	Not Tier I							A	A	F	SF	1R	SF	SF	2R	SF	2R	QF	0 / 9	13–8
Rome	Not Tier I			NH	Not Tier I			SF	A	A	A	QF	A	A	2R	2R	2R	A	0 / 5	5–5
Berlin	Not Tier I							QF	W	W	A	SF	F	W	SF	SF	SF	A	3 / 9	25–5
Montreal / Toronto	Not Tier I							2R	W	A	W	SF	SF	W	SF	1R	F	A	3 / 9	23–5
Zürich	NH	Not Tier I									SF	SF	1R	QF	F	SF	1R	A	0 / 7	9–7
Philadelphia	Not Held								Not Tier I		F	A	F	Not Tier I					0 / 2	6–2
Moscow	Not Held													NTI	SF	1R	QF	A	0 / 3	3–3
Career statistics
Year-end ranking	—N/a	—N/a	—N/a	26	11	9	3	7	2	5	5	11	5	2	9	11	3	—N/a	No. 1	

== Head-to-head records ==
- Arantxa Sánchez Vicario 0–4
- Serena Williams 0–1
- Venus Williams 0–3
- Lindsay Davenport 1–1
- Steffi Graf 0–6
- Monica Seles 0–2
- Martina Navratilova 1–9

== Personal life ==
She married Latvian tennis coach Aleksandr Neiland on 21 December 1989, after which her surname was changed from Savchenko to Neiland (Savčenko-Neiland). The marriage later ended in divorce.
