= 1990 Pilkington Glass Championships =

Women's tennis tournament

- Date: 18–24 June
- Edition: 16th
- Category: Tier II
- Draw: 64S / 32D
- Prize money: $350,000
- Surface: Grass
- Location: Eastbourne, United Kingdom
- Venue: Devonshire Park Lawn Tennis Club

Champions

Singles
- (United States) Martina Navratilova

Doubles
- (Soviet Union) Larisa Savchenko-Neiland (Soviet Union) Natasha Zvereva
← 1989 ·	Eastbourne International	· 1991 →

The 1990 Pilkington Glass Championships was a women's tennis tournament played on grass courts at the Devonshire Park Lawn Tennis Club in Eastbourne in the United Kingdom that was part of Tier II of the 1990 WTA Tour. The tournament was held from 18 June until 24 June 1990. First-seeded Martina Navratilova won the singles title and earned $70,000 first-prize money.

== Finals ==
=== Singles ===
(United States) Martina Navratilova defeated (United States) Gretchen Magers 6–0, 6–2

- It was Navratilova's fifth singles title of the year and the 139th of her career.

=== Doubles ===
(Soviet Union) Larisa Savchenko-Neiland / (Soviet Union) Natasha Zvereva defeated (United States) Patty Fendick / (United States) Zina Garrison 6–4, 6–3

- It was Savchenko-Neiland's second doubles title of the year and the 16th of her career. It was Zvereva's second doubles title of the year and the 9th of her career.
