= 1991 Pilkington Glass Championships – Singles =

Singles
- 1991 Pilkington Glass Championships

Final
- Champion: (United States) Martina Navratilova
- Runner-up: (Spain) Arantxa Sánchez Vicario
- Score: 6–4, 6–4

Details
- Draw: 64 (8Q/3LL)
- Seeds: 16

Events
Singles	Doubles
← 1990 ·	Eastbourne International	· 1992 →

Martina Navratilova won her fourth consecutive title, and her tenth overall title at Eastbourne, by defeating Arantxa Sánchez Vicario 6–4, 6–4 in the final.

== Seeds ==
1. (United States) Martina Navratilova (champion)
2. (Spain) Arantxa Sánchez Vicario (final)
3. (United States) Mary Joe Fernández (semifinals)
4. (Czechoslovakia) Jana Novotná (quarterfinals)
5. (United States) ~~Zina Garrison~~ (withdrew)
6. (Czechoslovakia) Helena Suková (second round)
7. (France) Nathalie Tauziat (second round)
8. (United States) Amy Frazier (first round)
9. (United States) ~~Anne Smith~~ (withdrew)
10. (Canada) Helen Kelesi (third round)
11. (United States) Lori McNeil (third round)
12. (Australia) Rachel McQuillan (second round)
13. (France) Julie Halard (third round)
14. (United States) Marianne Werdel (first round)
15. (South Africa) Rosalyn Fairbank-Nideffer (third round)
16. (United States) Gretchen Magers (second round)

== Draw ==
=== Key ===
- Q = Qualifier
- WC = Wild card
- LL = Lucky loser
- Alt = Alternate
- ITF = ITF entry
- PR = Protected ranking
- SR = Special ranking
- SE = Special exempt
- JE = Junior exempt
- JR = Junior Accelerator Programme entrant
- CO = College Accelerator Programme entrant
- NG = Next Gen Accelerator Program entrant
- w/o = Walkover
- r = Retired
- d = Defaulted

=== Finals ===
Quarterfinals
1	(United States) Martina Navratilova	6	6
Q	(United States) Heather Ludloff	1	1
3	(United States) Mary Joe Fernández	6	6
(Indonesia) Yayuk Basuki	2	1
(United States) Gigi Fernández	7^{10}	6
4	(Czechoslovakia) Jana Novotná	6^{8}	4
(United States) Pam Shriver	0	1
2	(Spain) Arantxa Sánchez Vicario	6	6

Semifinals
1	(United States) Martina Navratilova	6	6
3	(United States) Mary Joe Fernández	3	0
(United States) Gigi Fernández	1	1
2	(Spain) Arantxa Sánchez Vicario	6	6

Final
1	(United States) Martina Navratilova	6	6
2	(Spain) Arantxa Sánchez Vicario	4	4

=== Top half ===
==== Section 1 ====
First round
1	(United States) M Navratilova	6	6
(South Africa) A Coetzer	0	1
(United States) G Helgeson	2	3
(Italy) L Golarsa	6	6
(Australia) A Minter	5	2
(Netherlands) B Schultz	7	6
Q	(Hungary) A Temesvári	3	6	4
12	(Australia) R McQuillan	6	4	6
15	(South Africa) R Fairbank-Nideffer	6	6
(Australia) N Provis	2	2
(United Kingdom) S Smith	6	6
(Sweden) C Dahlman	3	2
(United States) L Harvey Wild	6	3	3
Q	(United States) H Ludloff	1	6	6
(United States) P Fendick	6^{5}	6	2
7	(France) N Tauziat	7^{7}	3	6

Second round
1	(United States) M Navratilova	6	6
(Italy) L Golarsa	0	0
(Netherlands) B Schultz	6	6
12	(Australia) R McQuillan	3	2
15	(South Africa) R Fairbank-Nideffer	6	7
(United Kingdom) S Smith	3	5
Q	(United States) H Ludloff	3	7^{9}	6
7	(France) N Tauziat	6	6^{7}	3

Third round
1	(United States) M Navratilova	6	6
(Netherlands) B Schultz	1	2
15	(South Africa) R Fairbank-Nideffer	6^{5}	6	3
Q	(United States) H Ludloff	7^{7}	4	6

Quarterfinals
1	(United States) M Navratilova	6	6
Q	(United States) H Ludloff	1	1

==== Section 2 ====
First round
3	(United States) MJ Fernández	6	2	6
Q	(France) N Herreman	3	6	1
(United Kingdom) S Gomer	6	6
(United States) P Louie Harper	4	4
(United Kingdom) A Grunfeld	2	4
(Australia) K Godridge	6	6
(Soviet Union) E Brioukhovets	3	4
10	(Canada) H Kelesi	6	6
13	(France) J Halard	7^{7}	6
(United Kingdom) C Wood	6^{4}	2
(United Kingdom) M Javer	6^{5}	2
(South Africa) E Reinach	7^{7}	6
(United States) S Stafford	0	3
(Indonesia) Y Basuki	6	6
Q	(United States) A Henricksson	4	6^{4}
(Germany) C Kohde-Kilsch	6	7^{7}

Second round
3	(United States) MJ Fernández	6	6
(United Kingdom) S Gomer	2	2
(Australia) K Godridge	3	3
10	(Canada) H Kelesi	6	6
13	(France) J Halard	1	6	6
(South Africa) E Reinach	6	4	4
(Indonesia) Y Basuki	6	6
(Germany) C Kohde-Kilsch	3	2

Third round
3	(United States) MJ Fernández	6	6
10	(Canada) H Kelesi	2	4
13	(France) J Halard	5	6^{6}
(Indonesia) Y Basuki	7	7^{8}

Quarterfinals
3	(United States) MJ Fernández	6	6
(Indonesia) Y Basuki	2	1

=== Bottom half ===
==== Section 3 ====
First round
8	(United States) A Frazier	2	3
(United Kingdom) J Durie	6	6
LL	(United States) S Martin	6	4	6
(United States) E deLone	3	6	1
(United States) G Fernández	6^{0}	6	6
Q	(Netherlands) D Wamelink	7^{7}	4	2
(France) A Dechaume	7^{7}	6
14	(United States) M Werdel	6^{1}	2
11	(United States) L McNeil	6	6
LL	(France) P Paradis-Mangon	3	4
(United States) T Whitlinger	6	6
Q	(United States) T Whittington	4	1
(Sweden) C Lindqvist	3	2
(United States) R White	6	6
(Japan) A Kijimuta	2	2
4	(Czechoslovakia) J Novotná	6	6

Second round
(United Kingdom) J Durie	w/o
LL	(United States) S Martin
(United States) G Fernández	6	6
(France) A Dechaume	4	3
11	(United States) L McNeil	6	6^{5}	6
(United States) T Whitlinger	3	7^{7}	1
(United States) R White	1	3
4	(Czechoslovakia) J Novotná	6	6

Third round
(United Kingdom) J Durie	3	3
(United States) G Fernández	6	6
11	(United States) L McNeil	2	6^{5}
4	(Czechoslovakia) J Novotná	6	7^{7}

Quarterfinals
(United States) G Fernández	7^{10}	6
4	(Czechoslovakia) J Novotná	6^{8}	4

==== Section 4 ====
First round
6	(Czechoslovakia) H Suková	6	7^{8}
(France) K Quentrec	1	6^{6}
(Soviet Union) L Savchenko	2	4
(United States) P Shriver	6	6
Q	(Germany) E Pfaff	6	4	1
(United States) D Faber	2	6	6
(Canada) P Hy	6	5	6
LL	(Soviet Union) E Maniokova	2	7	1
16	(United States) G Magers	6	6
Q	(United Kingdom) B Borneo	1	4
(Australia) E Smylie	7	7^{7}
(United States) S Rehe	5	6^{3}
(United Kingdom) S Loosemore	1	4
(Czechoslovakia) A Strnadová	6	6
(Germany) C Porwik	1	4
2	(Spain) A Sánchez Vicario	6	6

Second round
6	(Czechoslovakia) H Suková	5	4
(United States) P Shriver	7	6
(United States) D Faber	0	2
(Canada) P Hy	6	6
16	(United States) G Magers	6^{5}	6^{0}
(Australia) E Smylie	7^{7}	7^{7}
(Czechoslovakia) A Strnadová	3	2
2	(Spain) A Sánchez Vicario	6	6

Third round
(United States) P Shriver	6	6
(Canada) P Hy	2	3
(Australia) E Smylie	3	3
2	(Spain) A Sánchez Vicario	6	6

Quarterfinals
(United States) P Shriver	0	1
2	(Spain) A Sánchez Vicario	6	6
