= 1993 Volkswagen Cup =

- Date: 14–19 June
- Edition: 19th
- Category: Tier II
- Draw: 64S / 32D
- Prize money: $375,000
- Surface: Grass
- Location: Eastbourne, United Kingdom
- Venue: Devonshire Park

Champions

Singles
- (United States) Martina Navratilova

Doubles
- (United States) Gigi Fernández / (Belarus) Natalia Zvereva
← 1992 ·	Eastbourne International	· 1994 →

The 1993 Volkswagen Cup was a women's tennis tournament played on grass courts at the Devonshire Park Lawn Tennis Club in Eastbourne in the United Kingdom that was part of Tier II of the 1993 WTA Tour. The tournament was held from 14 June until 19 June 1993. First-seeded Martina Navratilova won the singles title and earned $75,000 first-prize money.

== Finals ==
=== Singles ===
(United States) Martina Navratilova defeated (Netherlands) Miriam Oremans 2–6, 6–2, 6–3

- It was Navratilova's third singles title of the year and the 164th of her career.

=== Doubles ===
(United States) Gigi Fernández / (Belarus) Natalia Zvereva defeated (Latvia) Larisa Savchenko / (Czech Republic) Jana Novotná 2–6, 7–5, 6–1

- It was Fernandez's seventh doubles title of the year and the 39th of her career. It was Zvereva's seventh doubles title of the year and the 35th of her career.
