= 1991 Pilkington Glass Championships – Doubles =

Doubles
- 1991 Pilkington Glass Championships

Final
- Champions: (Soviet Union) Larisa Savchenko (Soviet Union) Natasha Zvereva
- Runners-up: (United States) Gigi Fernández (Czechoslovakia) Jana Novotná
- Score: 2–6, 6–4, 6–4

Details
- Draw: 32
- Seeds: 8

Events
Singles	Doubles
← 1990 ·	Eastbourne International	· 1992 →

Larisa Savchenko and Natasha Zvereva successfully defended their title, by defeating Gigi Fernández and Jana Novotná 2–6, 6–4, 6–4 in the final.

== Seeds ==
1. (United States) Gigi Fernández / (Czechoslovakia) Jana Novotná (final)
2. (Soviet Union) Larisa Savchenko / (Soviet Union) Natasha Zvereva (champions)
3. (Spain) Arantxa Sánchez Vicario / (Czechoslovakia) Helena Suková (semifinals)
4. (United States) Mary Joe Fernández / (United States) Zina Garrison (semifinals)
5. (United States) Kathy Jordan / (United States) Lori McNeil (first round)
6. (United States) Gretchen Magers / (United States) Robin White (first round)
7. (Australia) Nicole Provis / (Australia) Elizabeth Smylie (quarterfinals)
8. (United States) Elise Burgin / (United States) Patty Fendick (first round)

== Draw ==
=== Key ===
- Q = Qualifier
- WC = Wild card
- LL = Lucky loser
- Alt = Alternate
- ITF = ITF entry
- PR = Protected ranking
- SR = Special ranking
- SE = Special exempt
- JE = Junior exempt
- JR = Junior Accelerator Programme entrant
- CO = College Accelerator Programme entrant
- NG = Next Gen Accelerator Program entrant
- w/o = Walkover
- r = Retired
- d = Defaulted

=== Finals ===
Semifinals
1	(United States) Gigi Fernández (Czechoslovakia) Jana Novotná	6	6
4	(United States) Mary Joe Fernández (United States) Zina Garrison	3	1
3	(Spain) Arantxa Sánchez Vicario (Czechoslovakia) Helena Suková	3	4
2	(Soviet Union) Larisa Savchenko (Soviet Union) Natasha Zvereva	6	6

Final
1	(United States) Gigi Fernández (Czechoslovakia) Jana Novotná	6	4	4
2	(Soviet Union) Larisa Savchenko (Soviet Union) Natasha Zvereva	2	6	6

=== Top half ===
First round
1	(United States) G Fernández (Czechoslovakia) J Novotná	6	6
(Australia) R McQuillan (Germany) C Porwik	3	2
(France) I Demongeot (United Kingdom) J Durie	6	6
(United States) B Nagelsen (France) M Pierce	3	3
(Bulgaria) K Maleeva (Bulgaria) M Maleeva	4	2
(South Africa) L Gregory (United States) A May	6	6
(Luxembourg) K Kschwendt (South Africa) E Reinach	7^{10}	4	6
5	(United States) K Jordan (United States) L McNeil	6^{8}	6	3
4	(United States) MJ Fernández (United States) Z Garrison	7^{7}	6
(United States) S Collins (Czechoslovakia) A Strnadová	6^{5}	4
(France) A Dechaume (Germany) W Probst	3	2
(France) N Herreman (Switzerland) C Caverzasio	6	6
(South Africa) L Barnard (United States) A Henricksson	5	2
(France) N Tauziat (Austria) J Wiesner	7	6
(United States) P Louie Harper (Japan) M Kidowaki	2	1
7	(Australia) N Provis (Australia) E Smylie	6	6

Second round
1	(United States) G Fernández (Czechoslovakia) J Novotná	4	6	6
(France) I Demongeot (United Kingdom) J Durie	6	2	3
(South Africa) L Gregory (United States) A May	6	6
(Luxembourg) K Kschwendt (South Africa) E Reinach	4	3
4	(United States) MJ Fernández (United States) Z Garrison	7	1	6
(France) N Herreman (Switzerland) C Caverzasio	5	6	2
(France) N Tauziat (Austria) J Wiesner	3	6^{4}
7	(Australia) N Provis (Australia) E Smylie	6	7^{7}

Quarterfinals
1	(United States) G Fernández (Czechoslovakia) J Novotná	6	6
(South Africa) L Gregory (United States) A May	3	0
4	(United States) MJ Fernández (United States) Z Garrison	6	6
7	(Australia) N Provis (Australia) E Smylie	2	4

Semifinals
1	(United States) G Fernández (Czechoslovakia) J Novotná	6	6
4	(United States) MJ Fernández (United States) Z Garrison	3	1

=== Bottom half ===
First round
6	(United States) G Magers (United States) R White	3	3
(United States) M Navratilova (United States) P Shriver	6	6
(United Kingdom) B Borneo (United Kingdom) C Wood	6	7^{8}
(Belgium) S Appelmans (Netherlands) C Vis	4	6^{6}
(Indonesia) Y Basuki (Indonesia) S Wibowo	6	6
(Australia) K Godridge (United States) G Helgeson	0	2
(United States) S Rehe (Hungary) A Temesvári	3	5
3	(Spain) A Sánchez Vicario (Czechoslovakia) H Suková	6	7
8	(United States) E Burgin (United States) P Fendick	3	6	5
(South Africa) R Fairbank-Nideffer (Netherlands) B Schultz	6	3	7
(Canada) J Hetherington (United States) K Rinaldi	6	6
(United Kingdom) M Javer (United Kingdom) S Smith	0	3
(Italy) L Golarsa (France) P Paradis-Mangon	6	7
(Soviet Union) E Brioukhovets (Soviet Union) E Maniokova	3	5
(United States) A Frazier (United States) L Spadea	2	6	2
2	(Soviet Union) L Savchenko (Soviet Union) N Zvereva	6	4	6

Second round
(United States) M Navratilova (United States) P Shriver	5	7	6
(United Kingdom) B Borneo (United Kingdom) C Wood	7	5	2
(Indonesia) Y Basuki (Indonesia) S Wibowo	2	2
3	(Spain) A Sánchez Vicario (Czechoslovakia) H Suková	6	6
(South Africa) R Fairbank-Nideffer (Netherlands) B Schultz	6^{4}	6	4
(Canada) J Hetherington (United States) K Rinaldi	7^{7}	3	6
(Italy) L Golarsa (France) P Paradis-Mangon	2	4
2	(Soviet Union) L Savchenko (Soviet Union) N Zvereva	6	6

Quarterfinals
(United States) M Navratilova (United States) P Shriver	3	1
3	(Spain) A Sánchez Vicario (Czechoslovakia) H Suková	6	6
(Canada) J Hetherington (United States) K Rinaldi	4	3
2	(Soviet Union) L Savchenko (Soviet Union) N Zvereva	6	6

Semifinals
3	(Spain) A Sánchez Vicario (Czechoslovakia) H Suková	3	4
2	(Soviet Union) L Savchenko (Soviet Union) N Zvereva	6	6
