= 1988 Pilkington Glass Championships =

- Date: 13–19 June
- Edition: 14th
- Category: Category 4
- Draw: 64S / 32D
- Prize money: $250,000
- Surface: Grass / outdoor
- Location: Eastbourne, United Kingdom
- Venue: Devonshire Park Lawn Tennis Club

Champions

Singles
- (United States) Martina Navratilova

Doubles
- (West Germany) Eva Pfaff / (Australia) Elizabeth Smylie
← 1987 ·	Eastbourne International	· 1989 →

The 1988 Pilkington Glass Championships was a women's tennis tournament played on grass courts at the Devonshire Park Lawn Tennis Club in Eastbourne in the United Kingdom and was part of Category 4 (Note: Tournaments, other than Grand Slams, with prize money of at least $250,000.) tier of the 1988 WTA Tour. The tournament ran from 13 June until 19 June 1988. First-seeded Martina Navratilova won the singles title, her seventh at the event.

== Finals ==
=== Singles ===
(United States) Martina Navratilova defeated (Soviet Union) Natasha Zvereva 6–2, 6–2

- It was Navratilova's 6th singles title of the year and the 135th of her career.

=== Doubles ===
(West Germany) Eva Pfaff / (Australia) Elizabeth Smylie defeated (New Zealand) Belinda Cordwell / (South Africa) Dianne van Rensburg 6–3, 7–6^{(8–6)}

- It was Pfaff's 3rd title of the year and the 7th of her career. It was Smylie's only title of the year and the 21st of her career.
