= 1987 Pilkington Glass Championships – Doubles =

Doubles
- 1987 Pilkington Glass Championships

Final
- Champions: (Soviet Union) Svetlana Parkhomenko (Soviet Union) Larisa Savchenko
- Runners-up: (South Africa) Rosalyn Fairbank (Australia) Elizabeth Smylie
- Score: 7–6^{(7–5)}, 4–6, 7–5

Details
- Draw: 32
- Seeds: 8

Events
Singles	Doubles
← 1986 ·	Eastbourne International	· 1988 →

Six-time defending champions Martina Navratilova and Pam Shriver did not compete this year, as both players chose to focus only on the singles tournament.

Svetlana Parkhomenko and Larisa Savchenko won the title by defeating Rosalyn Fairbank and Elizabeth Smylie 7–6^{(7–5)}, 4–6, 7–5 in the final.

== Seeds ==
1. (West Germany) Claudia Kohde-Kilsch / (Czechoslovakia) Helena Suková (semifinals)
2. (Czechoslovakia) Hana Mandlíková / (Australia) Wendy Turnbull (semifinals)
3. (South Africa) Rosalyn Fairbank / (Australia) Elizabeth Smylie (final)
4. (Soviet Union) Svetlana Parkhomenko / (Soviet Union) Larisa Savchenko (champions)
5. (United States) Lori McNeil / (United States) Robin White (quarterfinals)
6. (West Germany) Bettina Bunge / (United States) Gigi Fernández (quarterfinals)
7. (United States) Kathy Jordan / (United States) Anne Smith (first round)
8. (Argentina) Mercedes Paz / (West Germany) Eva Pfaff (first round)

== Draw ==
=== Key ===
- Q = Qualifier
- WC = Wild card
- LL = Lucky loser
- Alt = Alternate
- ITF = ITF entry
- PR = Protected ranking
- SR = Special ranking
- SE = Special exempt
- JE = Junior exempt
- JR = Junior Accelerator Programme entrant
- CO = College Accelerator Programme entrant
- NG = Next Gen Accelerator Program entrant
- w/o = Walkover
- r = Retired
- d = Defaulted

=== Finals ===
Semifinals
1	(West Germany) Claudia Kohde-Kilsch (Czechoslovakia) Helena Suková	6	6	3
3	(South Africa) Rosalyn Fairbank (Australia) Elizabeth Smylie	2	7	6
4	(Soviet Union) Svetlana Parkhomenko (Soviet Union) Larisa Savchenko	6	6	6
2	(Czechoslovakia) Hana Mandlíková (Australia) Wendy Turnbull	3	7	4

Final
3	(South Africa) Rosalyn Fairbank (Australia) Elizabeth Smylie	6^{5}	6	5
4	(Soviet Union) Svetlana Parkhomenko (Soviet Union) Larisa Savchenko	7^{7}	4	7

=== Top half ===
First round
1	(West Germany) C Kohde-Kilsch (Czechoslovakia) H Suková	6	6
(Canada) J Hetherington (United States) P Smith	2	2
(United States) G Magers (United States) W White	3	4
(United Kingdom) A Hobbs (United States) C Reynolds	6	6
(United Kingdom) J Durie (France) C Tanvier	4	3
(Brazil) N Dias (Argentina) P Tarabini	6	6
(United Kingdom) V Lake (United Kingdom) C Wood	2	0
6	(West Germany) B Bunge (United States) G Fernández	6	6
3	(South Africa) R Fairbank (Australia) E Smylie	6	6
(United States) H Na (South Africa) D Van Rensubrg	3	3
(United States) ML Piatek (United States) A White	4	1
(France) I Demongeot (France) N Tauziat	6	6
(United States) C Benjamin (United States) B Gerken	6	6
(United States) P Louie Harper (United States) H Ludloff	3	2
(United States) A Henricksson (United States) M Van Nostrand	6	6	7
8	(Argentina) M Paz (West Germany) E Pfaff	7	3	5

Second round
1	(West Germany) C Kohde-Kilsch (Czechoslovakia) H Suková	6	6
(United Kingdom) A Hobbs (United States) C Reynolds	2	1
(Brazil) N Dias (Argentina) P Tarabini	4	3
6	(West Germany) B Bunge (United States) G Fernández	6	6
3	(South Africa) R Fairbank (Australia) E Smylie	6	6
(France) I Demongeot (France) N Tauziat	3	1
(United States) C Benjamin (United States) B Gerken	6	4	6
(United States) A Henricksson (United States) M Van Nostrand	3	6	3

Quarterfinals
1	(West Germany) C Kohde-Kilsch (Czechoslovakia) H Suková	2	6	6
6	(West Germany) B Bunge (United States) G Fernández	6	4	3
3	(South Africa) R Fairbank (Australia) E Smylie	6	6
(United States) C Benjamin (United States) B Gerken	2	2

Semifinals
1	(West Germany) C Kohde-Kilsch (Czechoslovakia) H Suková	6	6	3
3	(South Africa) R Fairbank (Australia) E Smylie	2	7	6

=== Bottom half ===
First round
5	(United States) L McNeil (United States) R White	6	3	6
(Czechoslovakia) J Novotná (France) C Suire	4	6	2
(Australia) D Balestrat (United States) T Phelps	5	6	6
(South Africa) E Reinach (South Africa) M Reinach	7	4	8
(Australia) N Provis (Spain) A Sánchez Vicario	7	4	4
(United Kingdom) S Gomer (United Kingdom) J Salmon	6	6	6
(Hong Kong) P Hy (Japan) E Inoue	3	4
4	(Soviet Union) S Parkhomenko (Soviet Union) L Savchenko	6	6
7	(United States) K Jordan (United States) A Smith	3	1
(United States) K Horvath (Netherlands) M Mesker	6	6
(United States) S Collins (United States) S Walsh-Pete	4	7	6
(Bulgaria) K Maleeva (Bulgaria) M Maleeva	6	6	0
(Canada) H Kelesi (Italy) R Reggi	7	6	3
(United States) Ca MacGregor (United States) Cy MacGregor	6	7	6
(United States) B Herr (United States) A Moulton	7	6	3
2	(Czechoslovakia) H Mandlíková (Australia) W Turnbull	5	7	6

Second round
5	(United States) L McNeil (United States) R White	6	1	6
(South Africa) E Reinach (South Africa) M Reinach	4	6	3
(United Kingdom) S Gomer (United Kingdom) J Salmon	3	6
4	(Soviet Union) S Parkhomenko (Soviet Union) L Savchenko	6	7
(United States) K Horvath (Netherlands) M Mesker	6	6
(United States) S Collins (United States) S Walsh-Pete	7	7
(United States) Ca MacGregor (United States) Cy MacGregor	3	4
2	(Czechoslovakia) H Mandlíková (Australia) W Turnbull	6	6

Quarterfinals
5	(United States) L McNeil (United States) R White	4	6	5
4	(Soviet Union) S Parkhomenko (Soviet Union) L Savchenko	6	2	7
(United States) S Collins (United States) S Walsh-Pete	4	3
2	(Czechoslovakia) H Mandlíková (Australia) W Turnbull	6	6

Semifinals
4	(Soviet Union) S Parkhomenko (Soviet Union) L Savchenko	6	6	6
2	(Czechoslovakia) H Mandlíková (Australia) W Turnbull	3	7	4
