= 1987 Pilkington Glass Championships – Singles =

Singles
- 1987 Pilkington Glass Championships

Final
- Champion: (Czechoslovakia) Helena Suková
- Runner-up: (United States) Martina Navratilova
- Score: 7–6^{(7–5)}, 6–3

Details
- Draw: 56 (8Q/1LL)
- Seeds: 16

Events
Singles	Doubles
← 1986 ·	Eastbourne International	· 1988 →

Martina Navratilova was the five-time defending champion, but lost in the final to Helena Suková. The score was 7–6^{(7–5)}, 6–3.

== Seeds ==
1. (United States) Martina Navratilova (final)
2. (United States) Chris Evert (semifinals)
3. (Czechoslovakia) Helena Suková (champion)
4. (United States) Pam Shriver (semifinals)
5. (Argentina) Gabriela Sabatini (quarterfinals)
6. (West Germany) Bettina Bunge (third round)
7. (United States) Lori McNeil (first round)
8. (Sweden) Catarina Lindqvist (third round)
9. (Australia) Wendy Turnbull (third round)
10. (Italy) Raffaella Reggi (second round)
11. (United States) Robin White (third round)
12. (Soviet Union) Larisa Savchenko (quarterfinals)
13. (Australia) Elizabeth Smylie (third round)
14. (United States) Mary Joe Fernández (first round)
15. (France) Nathalie Tauziat (first round)
16. (Australia) Dianne Balestrat (third round)

== Draw ==
=== Key ===
- Q = Qualifier
- WC = Wild card
- LL = Lucky loser
- Alt = Alternate
- ITF = ITF entry
- PR = Protected ranking
- SR = Special ranking
- SE = Special exempt
- JE = Junior exempt
- JR = Junior Accelerator Programme entrant
- CO = College Accelerator Programme entrant
- NG = Next Gen Accelerator Program entrant
- w/o = Walkover
- r = Retired
- d = Defaulted

=== Finals ===
Quarterfinals
1	(United States) Martina Navratilova	7	6
(France) Isabelle Demongeot	5	3
4	(United States) Pam Shriver	6	6
2	(Argentina) Gabriela Sabatini	3	3
(South Africa) Rosalyn Fairbank	7	3	6
3	(Czechoslovakia) Helena Suková	6	6	8
12	(Soviet Union) Larisa Savchenko	1	3
2	(United States) Chris Evert	6	6

Semifinals
1	(United States) Martina Navratilova	6	4	6
4	(United States) Pam Shriver	4	6	3
3	(Czechoslovakia) Helena Suková	4	6	8
2	(United States) Chris Evert	6	4	6

Final
1	(United States) Martina Navratilova	6^{5}	3
3	(Czechoslovakia) Helena Suková	7^{7}	6

=== Top half ===
==== Section 1 ====
First round
1	(United States) M Navratilova	6	6
(United States) M Werdel	1	0
(United States) G Magers	6	6
(United Kingdom) V Lake	4	1
Q	(Soviet Union) N Bykova	4	3
(United States) G Fernández	6	6
(United States) K Keil	3	4
11	(United States) R White	6	6
15	(France) N Tauziat	2	6
(United Kingdom) A Hobbs	6	7
(Italy) L Garrone	5
(United States) B Gerken	2^{r}
Q	(United States) ML Piatek	5	4
Q	(Australia) A Minter	7	6
(France) I Demongeot	6	1	6
7	(United States) L McNeil	4	6	3

Second round
1	(United States) M Navratilova	6	6
(United States) G Magers	1	0
(United States) G Fernández	2	5
11	(United States) R White	6	7
(United Kingdom) A Hobbs	7	4	9
(Italy) L Garrone	5	6	7
Q	(Australia) A Minter	6	5	6
(France) I Demongeot	4	7	8

Third round
1	(United States) M Navratilova	6	6
11	(United States) R White	4	3
(United Kingdom) A Hobbs	6	1	3
(France) I Demongeot	2	6	6

Quarterfinals
1	(United States) M Navratilova	7	6
(France) I Demongeot	5	3

==== Section 2 ====
First round
4	(United States) P Shriver	6	6
Q	(United Kingdom) J Louis	0	2
(West Germany) E Pfaff	3	2
(South Africa) E Reinach	6	6
(United States) A Moulton	6	6
(France) N Herreman	2	4
(Argentina) M Paz	3	4
13	(Australia) E Smylie	6	6
16	(Australia) B Balestrat	6	6
(United States) M Van Nostrand	3	3
(United Kingdom) S Gomer	7	7
(Hong Kong) P Hy	6	6
(Netherlands) M Mesker	1	6	3
(United States) H Na	6	1	6
(Japan) E Inoue	3	6	2
5	(Argentina) G Sabatini	6	4	6

Second round
4	(United States) P Shriver	4	6	6
(South Africa) E Reinach	6	1	2
(United States) A Moulton	3	1
13	(Australia) E Smylie	6	6
16	(Australia) B Balestrat	7	6
(United Kingdom) S Gomer	5	1
(United States) H Na	4	3
5	(Argentina) G Sabatini	6	6

Third round
4	(United States) P Shriver	6	6
13	(Australia) E Smylie	4	1
16	(Australia) B Balestrat	5	4
5	(Argentina) G Sabatini	7	6

Quarterfinals
4	(United States) P Shriver	6	6
5	(Argentina) G Sabatini	3	3

=== Bottom half ===
==== Section 3 ====
First round
8	(Sweden) C Lindqvist	4	6	6
(United States) A Henricksson	6	3	3
(South Africa) D Van Rensburg	6	7
Q	(Netherlands) N Jagerman	3	6
(United States) B Herr	2	7	6
(France) C Tanvier	6	5	8
(South Africa) R Fairbank	7	6
14	(United States) MJ Fernández	6	2
9	(Australia) W Turnbull	5	6	3
(United States) K Jordan	7	3	6
Q	(Australia) E Minter	6	1	6
(United States) H Ludloff	3	6	3
(United Kingdom) A Croft	2	6	4
(United States) P Casale	6	2	6
(United Kingdom) J Durie	0	4
3	(Czechoslovakia) H Suková	6	6

Second round
8	(Sweden) C Lindqvist	6	6
(South Africa) D Van Rensburg	4	0
(France) C Tanvier	7	1	2
(South Africa) R Fairbank	5	6	6
(United States) K Jordan	2	4
Q	(Australia) E Minter	6	6
(United States) P Casale	2	1
3	(Czechoslovakia) H Suková	6	6

Third round
8	(Sweden) C Lindqvist	3	2
(South Africa) R Fairbank	6	6
Q	(Australia) E Minter	5	2
3	(Czechoslovakia) H Suková	7	6

Quarterfinals
(South Africa) R Fairbank	7	3	6
3	(Czechoslovakia) H Suková	6	6	8

==== Section 4 ====
First round
6	(West Germany) B Bunge	4	7	7
(United States) B Bowes	6	6	5
(United States) Ca MacGregor	3	1
(Soviet Union) N Zvereva	6	6
(United States) P Louie Harper	4	2
Q	(Japan) A Kijimuta	6	6
LL	(United States) R Reis	3	2
12	(Soviet Union) L Savchenko	6	6
10	(Italy) R Reggi	6	6
(United Kingdom) J Salmon	0	3
(United States) C Benjamin	2	5
(United States) W White	6	7
(United States) L Bonder	6	6
(United Kingdom) C Wood	4	1
Q	(United States) S Walsh-Pete	2	1
2	(United States) C Evert	6	6

Second round
6	(West Germany) B Bunge	6	6	7
(Soviet Union) N Zvereva	7	0	5
Q	(Japan) A Kijimuta	3	3
12	(Soviet Union) L Savchenko	6	6
10	(Italy) R Reggi	6	3	4
(United States) W White	4	6	6
(United States) L Bonder	1	1
2	(United States) C Evert	6	6

Third round
6	(West Germany) B Bunge	2	7	6
12	(Soviet Union) L Savchenko	6	6	8
(United States) W White	3	4
2	(United States) C Evert	6	6

Quarterfinals
12	(Soviet Union) L Savchenko	1	3
2	(United States) C Evert	6	6
