= 1982 BMW Championships =

- Date: 14–19 June
- Edition: 9th
- Category: Toyota Series
- Draw: 64S / 32D
- Prize money: $150,000
- Surface: Grass
- Location: Eastbourne, United Kingdom
- Venue: Devonshire Park

Champions

Singles
- (United States) Martina Navratilova

Doubles
- (United States) Billie Jean King / (United States) Pam Shriver
← 1981 ·	Eastbourne International	· 1983 →

The 1982 BMW Championships was a women's tennis tournament played on outdoor grass courts at Devonshire Park in Eastbourne in the United Kingdom that was part of the Toyota Series category of the 1982 WTA Tour. It was the ninth edition of the tournament and was held from 14 June through 19 June 1982. First-seeded Martina Navratilova won the singles title and earned $23,000 in first-prize money.

== Finals ==
=== Singles ===
(United States) Martina Navratilova defeated (Czechoslovakia) Hana Mandlíková 6–4, 6–3

- It was Navratilova's 9th singles title of the year and the 64th of her career.

=== Doubles ===
(United States) Martina Navratilova / (United States) Pam Shriver defeated (United States) Kathy Jordan / (United States) Anne Smith 6–3, 6–4

== Prize money ==
Event	W	F	SF	QF	Round of 16	Round of 32	Prel. round
Singles	$23,000	$12,000	$6,100	$3,100	$1,600	$825	$450
