= 1992 Pilkington Glass Championships – Doubles =

Doubles
- 1992 Pilkington Glass Championships

Final
- Champions: (Czechoslovakia) Jana Novotná (Latvia) Larisa Savchenko-Neiland
- Runners-up: (United States) Mary Joe Fernández (United States) Zina Garrison
- Score: 6–0, 6–3

Details
- Draw: 32 (2WC/1Q)
- Seeds: 8

Events
Singles	Doubles
← 1991 ·	Eastbourne International	· 1993 →

Larisa Savchenko-Neiland and Natasha Zvereva were the defending champions, but competed this year with different partners.

Zvereva teamed up with Gigi Fernández and lost in the semifinals to Mary Joe Fernández and Zina Garrison.

Savchenko-Neiland teamed up with Jana Novotná and successfully defended her title, by defeating Fernández and Garrison 6–0, 6–3 in the final.

== Seeds ==
1. (Czechoslovakia) Jana Novotná / (Latvia) Larisa Savchenko-Neiland (champions)
2. (United States) Gigi Fernández / (Commonwealth of Independent States) Natasha Zvereva (semifinals, retired)
3. (Spain) Arantxa Sánchez Vicario / (Czechoslovakia) Helena Suková (semifinals)
4. (United States) Mary Joe Fernández / (United States) Zina Garrison (final)
5. (United States) Katrina Adams / (Netherlands) Manon Bollegraf (first round)
6. (United States) Sandy Collins / (South Africa) Elna Reinach (second round)
7. (Canada) Jill Hetherington / (United States) Kathy Rinaldi (quarterfinals)
8. (Australia) Nicole Provis / (Australia) Elizabeth Smylie (second round)

== Draw ==
=== Key ===
- Q = Qualifier
- WC = Wild card
- LL = Lucky loser
- Alt = Alternate
- SE = Special exempt
- PR = Protected ranking
- ITF = ITF entry
- JE = Junior exempt
- w/o = Walkover
- r = Retired
- d = Defaulted
- SR = Special ranking

=== Finals ===
Semifinals
1	(Czechoslovakia) Jana Novotná (Latvia) Larisa Savchenko-Neiland	6	6
3	(Spain) Arantxa Sánchez Vicario (Czechoslovakia) Helena Suková	3	4
4	(United States) Mary Joe Fernández (United States) Zina Garrison	7	2
2	(United States) Gigi Fernández (Commonwealth of Independent States) Natasha Zvereva	5	3^{r}

Final
1	(Czechoslovakia) Jana Novotná (Latvia) Larisa Savchenko-Neiland	6	6
4	(United States) Mary Joe Fernández (United States) Zina Garrison	0	3

=== Top half ===
First round
1	(Czechoslovakia) J Novotná (Latvia) L Savchenko-Neiland	6	6
(France) C Suire (Netherlands) C Vis	4	2
(Belgium) S Appelmans (Germany) C Porwik	5	6^{5}
(Australia) JA Faull (New Zealand) J Richardson	7	7^{7}
(United States) B Nagelsen (United States) R White	3	1
(United States) L McNeil (Australia) R Stubbs	6	6
(United States) P Fendick (Czechoslovakia) A Strnadová	6	6
5	(United States) K Adams (Netherlands) M Bollegraf	4	3
3	(Spain) A Sánchez Vicario (Czechoslovakia) H Suková	7	6
(Germany) C Kohde-Kilsch (United States) L Harvey Wild	5	2
(Australia) L Field (South Africa) L Gregory	7^{7}	6
(France) P Paradis-Mangon (France) S Testud	6^{5}	2
(South Africa) R Fairbank-Nideffer (Netherlands) B Schultz	6	6
(United States) E Burgin (United States) G Magers	4	2
Q	(Canada) P Hy (Australia) T Morton	6^{2}	4
7	(Canada) J Hetherington (United States) K Rinaldi	7^{7}	6

Second round
1	(Czechoslovakia) J Novotná (Latvia) L Savchenko-Neiland	6	7^{7}
(Australia) JA Faull (New Zealand) J Richardson	2	6^{0}
(United States) L McNeil (Australia) R Stubbs	6	4	4
(United States) P Fendick (Czechoslovakia) A Strnadová	4	6	6
3	(Spain) A Sánchez Vicario (Czechoslovakia) H Suková	6	6
(Australia) L Field (South Africa) L Gregory	2	2
(South Africa) R Fairbank-Nideffer (Netherlands) B Schultz	2	4
7	(Canada) J Hetherington (United States) K Rinaldi	6	6

Quarterfinals
1	(Czechoslovakia) J Novotná (Latvia) L Savchenko-Neiland	6	4	6
(United States) P Fendick (Czechoslovakia) A Strnadová	2	6	4
3	(Spain) A Sánchez Vicario (Czechoslovakia) H Suková	6	6
7	(Canada) J Hetherington (United States) K Rinaldi	1	3

Semifinals
1	(Czechoslovakia) J Novotná (Latvia) L Savchenko-Neiland	6	6
3	(Spain) A Sánchez Vicario (Czechoslovakia) H Suková	3	4

=== Bottom half ===
First round
6	(United States) S Collins (South Africa) E Reinach	6	6
(United States) S Stafford (United States) M Werdel	4	3
(United States) H Ludloff (Spain) C Martínez	7	6
WC	(United Kingdom) M Javer (United Kingdom) V Lake	5	2
(France) I Demongeot (France) N Tauziat	6	5	6
(United States) P Louie Harper (United States) Ca MacGregor	0	7	3
(Commonwealth of Independent States) E Brioukhovets (Commonwealth of Independent States) N Medvedeva	3	4
4	(United States) MJ Fernández (United States) Z Garrison	6	6
8	(Australia) N Provis (Australia) E Smylie	6	6
(United States) D Graham (United States) G Helgeson	2	4
WC	(United Kingdom) A Grunfeld (United Kingdom) J Salmon	2	2
(Japan) K Date (Japan) M Kidowaki	6	6
(United States) A Frazier (United States) K Po	7^{7}	6
(United Kingdom) B Borneo (United Kingdom) C Wood	6^{2}	0
(Indonesia) Y Basuki (United Kingdom) J Durie	3	3
2	(United States) G Fernández (Commonwealth of Independent States) N Zvereva	6	6

Second round
6	(United States) S Collins (South Africa) E Reinach	4	7	4
(United States) H Ludloff (Spain) C Martínez	6	5	6
(France) I Demongeot (France) N Tauziat	4	3
4	(United States) MJ Fernández (United States) Z Garrison	6	6
8	(Australia) N Provis (Australia) E Smylie	3	3
(Japan) K Date (Japan) M Kidowaki	6	6
(United States) A Frazier (United States) K Po	5	3
2	(United States) G Fernández (Commonwealth of Independent States) N Zvereva	7	6

Quarterfinals
(United States) H Ludloff (Spain) C Martínez	4	4
4	(United States) MJ Fernández (United States) Z Garrison	6	6
(Japan) K Date (Japan) M Kidowaki	1	3
2	(United States) G Fernández (Commonwealth of Independent States) N Zvereva	6	6

Semifinals
4	(United States) MJ Fernández (United States) Z Garrison	7	2
2	(United States) G Fernández (Commonwealth of Independent States) N Zvereva	5	3^{r}
