= 1992 Pilkington Glass Championships – Singles =

Singles
- 1992 Pilkington Glass Championships

Final
- Champion: (United States) Lori McNeil
- Runner-up: (United States) Linda Harvey Wild
- Score: 6–4, 6–4

Details
- Draw: 64 (3WC/8Q/2LL)
- Seeds: 16

Events
Singles	Doubles
← 1991 ·	Eastbourne International	· 1993 →

Martina Navratilova was the defending champion, but lost in the second round to Linda Harvey Wild.

Lori McNeil won the title by defeating Harvey Wild 6–4, 6–4 in the final.

== Seeds ==
1. (United States) Martina Navratilova (second round)
2. (United States) Mary Joe Fernández (semifinals)
3. (Spain) Conchita Martínez (third round)
4. (Czechoslovakia) Jana Novotná (quarterfinals)
5. (United States) Zina Garrison (first round)
6. (France) Nathalie Tauziat (quarterfinals)
7. (Czechoslovakia) Helena Suková (quarterfinals)
8. (Japan) Kimiko Date (second round)
9. (United States) Amy Frazier (first round)
10. (United States) Gigi Fernández (first round)
11. (United States) Lori McNeil (champion)
12. (Commonwealth of Independent States) ~~Natasha Zvereva~~ (withdrew)
13. (Netherlands) Brenda Schultz (first round)
14. (Commonwealth of Independent States) Natalia Medvedeva (second round)
15. (United States) Pam Shriver (third round)
16. (Netherlands) Manon Bollegraf (first round)

== Draw ==
=== Key ===
- Q = Qualifier
- WC = Wild card
- LL = Lucky loser
- Alt = Alternate
- SE = Special exempt
- PR = Protected ranking
- ITF = ITF entry
- JE = Junior exempt
- w/o = Walkover
- r = Retired
- d = Defaulted
- SR = Special ranking

=== Finals ===
Quarterfinals
(United States) Linda Harvey Wild	6	6
(Australia) Rennae Stubbs	1	1
4	(Czechoslovakia) Jana Novotná	1	3
(South Africa) Rosalyn Fairbank-Nideffer	6	6
6	(France) Nathalie Tauziat	6^{2}	7^{11}	5
11	(United States) Lori McNeil	7^{7}	6^{9}	7
7	(Czechoslovakia) Helena Suková	3	4
2	(United States) Mary Joe Fernández	6	6

Semifinals
(United States) Linda Harvey Wild	6	6
(South Africa) Rosalyn Fairbank-Nideffer	1	3
11	(United States) Lori McNeil	7^{7}	6
2	(United States) Mary Joe Fernández	6^{4}	0

Final
(United States) Linda Harvey Wild	4	4
11	(United States) Lori McNeil	6	6

=== Top half ===
==== Section 1 ====
First round
1	(United States) M Navratilova	6	6
WC	(United Kingdom) A Grunfeld	2	2
Q	(France) C Suire	3	6^{6}
(United States) L Harvey Wild	6	7^{8}
Q	(South Africa) T Price	2	5
(Australia) J Byrne	6	7
(Latvia) L Savchenko-Neiland	6	6
16	(Netherlands) M Bollegraf	3	3
LL	(Canada) J Hetherington	6	6
(France) C Tanvier	4	2
(Australia) R Stubbs	6	6
(Switzerland) C Fauche	3	0
(United Kingdom) M Javer	2	4
WC	(United Kingdom) SA Siddall	6	6
(United Kingdom) J Durie	6	7
5	(United States) Z Garrison	3	5

Second round
1	(United States) M Navratilova	3	7^{7}	3
(United States) L Harvey Wild	6	6^{4}	6
(Australia) J Byrne	2	2
(Latvia) L Savchenko-Neiland	6	6
LL	(Canada) J Hetherington	6	1	4
(Australia) R Stubbs	3	6	6
WC	(United Kingdom) SA Siddall	0	1
(United Kingdom) J Durie	6	6

Third round
(United States) L Harvey Wild	3	7^{8}	6
(Latvia) L Savchenko-Neiland	6	6^{6}	4
(Australia) R Stubbs	6	6
(United Kingdom) J Durie	3	1

Quarterfinals
(United States) L Harvey Wild	6	6
(Australia) R Stubbs	1	1

==== Section 2 ====
First round
4	(Czechoslovakia) J Novotná	3	6	6
(Indonesia) Y Basuki	6	3	4
(United States) T Whitlinger	3	4
(Japan) M Endo	6	6
WC	(United Kingdom) V Lake	6	2	5
(South Africa) E Reinach	4	6	7
(France) I Demongeot	6	6
9	(United States) A Frazier	3	3
14	(Commonwealth of Independent States) N Medvedeva	2	6	6
Q	(Slovenia) T Križan	6	1	3
(Commonwealth of Independent States) E Brioukhovets	2	6	6
Q	(Australia) T Morton	6	4	4
(United States) M Werdel	3	6	3
(South Africa) R Fairbank-Nideffer	6	4	6
(Japan) M Kidowaki	4	6	4
8	(Japan) K Date	6	2	6

Second round
4	(Czechoslovakia) J Novotná	6	6
(Japan) M Endo	4	4
(South Africa) E Reinach	3	7	6
(France) I Demongeot	6	5	3
14	(Commonwealth of Independent States) N Medvedeva	6^{6}	6	4
(Commonwealth of Independent States) E Brioukhovets	7^{8}	1	6
(South Africa) R Fairbank-Nideffer	7^{7}	6
8	(Japan) K Date	6^{4}	1

Third round
4	(Czechoslovakia) J Novotná	6	6
(South Africa) E Reinach	1	2
(Commonwealth of Independent States) E Brioukhovets	5	5
(South Africa) R Fairbank-Nideffer	7	7

Quarterfinals
4	(Czechoslovakia) J Novotná	1	3
(South Africa) R Fairbank-Nideffer	6	6

=== Bottom half ===
==== Section 3 ====
First round
6	(France) N Tauziat	6	6
Q	(United States) G Magers	3	2
(Sweden) C Lindqvist	4	5
(France) P Paradis-Mangon	6	7
LL	(United States) H Ludloff	7^{7}	6
(United States) G Helgeson	6^{3}	3
(United States) C Rubin	0	2
15	(United States) P Shriver	6	6
11	(United States) L McNeil	6	6
Q	(Latvia) A Blumberga	1	2
(United States) R White	6	6
(United Kingdom) S Gomer	3	2
(France) N Herreman	2	1
(Australia) N Provis	6	6
(United States) K Adams	1	1
3	(Spain) C Martínez	6	6

Second round
6	(France) N Tauziat	6	4	7
(France) P Paradis-Mangon	2	6	5
LL	(United States) H Ludloff	3	1
15	(United States) P Shriver	6	6
11	(United States) L McNeil	6	6
(United States) R White	4	4
(Australia) N Provis	7	6^{4}	4
3	(Spain) C Martínez	5	7^{7}	6

Third round
6	(France) N Tauziat	6	6
15	(United States) P Shriver	3	4
11	(United States) L McNeil	6	6
3	(Spain) C Martínez	0	3

Quarterfinals
6	(France) N Tauziat	6^{2}	7^{11}	5
11	(United States) L McNeil	7^{7}	6^{9}	7

==== Section 4 ====
First round
7	(Czechoslovakia) H Suková	6	6
Q	(New Zealand) J Richardson	1	4
(France) N van Lottum	0	6	4
Q	(United States) S McCarthy	6	4	6
(Italy) L Golarsa	6^{9}	6	4
(United States) K Rinaldi	7^{11}	2	6
(United States) P Fendick	4	7^{7}	6
13	(Netherlands) B Schultz	6	6^{0}	4
10	(United States) G Fernández	4	2
(Canada) P Hy	6	6
(United States) K Po	7	6
(United Kingdom) C Wood	5	1
(France) S Testud	7	6
(United States) L Allen	5	2
(Germany) K Kohde-Kilsch	3	1
2	(United States) MJ Fernández	6	6

Second round
7	(Czechoslovakia) H Suková	6	6
Q	(United States) S McCarthy	4	2
(United States) K Rinaldi	6	4	0
(United States) P Fendick	1	6	6
(Canada) P Hy	6	6
(United States) K Po	2	3
(France) S Testud	6^{5}	4
2	(United States) MJ Fernández	7^{7}	6

Third round
7	(Czechoslovakia) H Suková	6	6
(United States) P Fendick	4	0
(Canada) P Hy	3	3
2	(United States) MJ Fernández	6	6

Quarterfinals
7	(Czechoslovakia) H Suková	3	4
2	(United States) MJ Fernández	6	6
