= 1985 Pilkington Glass Championships =

Coordinates: 50°45′51″N 0°17′0″E

- Date: 17–22 June
- Edition: 12th
- Category: 3
- Draw: 64S / 32D
- Prize money: $175,000
- Surface: Grass / outdoor
- Location: Eastbourne, United Kingdom
- Venue: Devonshire Park Lawn Tennis Club

Champions

Singles
- (United States) Martina Navratilova

Doubles
- (United States) Martina Navratilova (United States) Pam Shriver
← 1984 ·	Eastbourne International	· 1986 →

The 1985 Pilkington Glass Championships was a women's tennis tournament played on grass courts at the Devonshire Park Lawn Tennis Club in Eastbourne, United Kingdom and was part of the Category 3 tier of the 1985 WTA Tour. It was the 12th edition of the tournament and ran from 17 June until 22 June 1985. First-seeded Martina Navratilova won the singles title, her fourth consecutive at the event and fifth in total.

== Finals ==
=== Singles ===
(United States) Martina Navratilova defeated (Czechoslovakia) Helena Suková 6–4, 6–3

- It was Navratilova's 7th singles title of the year and the 106th of her career.

=== Doubles ===
(United States) Martina Navratilova / (United States) Pam Shriver defeated (United States) Kathy Jordan / (Australia) Elizabeth Smylie 7–5, 6–4
