= 1979 Colgate International =

- Date: 18–23 June 1979
- Edition: 5th
- Category: Colgate Series (AAA)
- Draw: 64S / 32D
- Prize money: $100,000
- Surface: Grass / outdoor
- Location: Eastbourne, United Kingdom
- Venue: Devonshire Park

Champions

Singles
- (United States) Chris Evert

Doubles
- (Netherlands) Betty Stöve / (Australia) Wendy Turnbull
← 1978 ·	Eastbourne International	· 1980 →

The 1979 Colgate International was a women's tennis tournament played on outdoor grass courts at Devonshire Park in Eastbourne in the United Kingdom. The event was part of the AAA (Note: Tournaments with prize money for the women of at least $100,000.) category of the 1979 Colgate Series. It was the fifth edition of the tournament and was held from 18 June through 23 June 1979. Second-seeded Chris Evert survived four match points in the three-hour final against first-seeded Martina Navratilova to win the singles title and earn $20,000 first-prize money.

== Finals ==
=== Singles ===
(United States) Chris Evert defeated (United States) Martina Navratilova 7–5, 5–7, 13–11

- It was Evert's 6th singles title of the year and the 91st of her career.

=== Doubles ===
(Netherlands) Betty Stöve / (Australia) Wendy Turnbull defeated (South Africa) Ilana Kloss / (United States) Betty-Ann Stuart 6–2, 6–2

== Prize money ==
Event	W	F	SF	QF	Round of 16	Round of 32	Round of 64
Singles	$20,000	$10,000	$4,800	$2,100	$1,000	$525	$225

== See also ==
- Evert–Navratilova rivalry
