= 1980 BMW Challenge =

- Date: 16–21 June
- Edition: 7th
- Category: Colgate Series (AAA) (Note: Tournaments with prize money for the women of at least $125,000.)
- Draw: 64S / 32D
- Prize money: $125,000
- Surface: Grass
- Location: Eastbourne, United Kingdom
- Venue: Devonshire Park

Champions

Singles
- (United States) Tracy Austin

Doubles
- (United States) Kathy Jordan / (United States) Anne Smith
← 1979 ·	Eastbourne International	· 1981 →

The 1980 BMW Challenge was a women's tennis tournament played on outdoor grass courts at Devonshire Park in Eastbourne in the United Kingdom that was part of the Colgate Series category of the 1980 WTA Tour. It was the seventh edition of the tournament and was held from 16 June through 21 June 1980. Second-seeded Tracy Austin won the singles title and earned $22,000 first-prize money.

== Finals ==
=== Singles ===
(United States) Tracy Austin defeated (Australia) Wendy Turnbull 7–6^{(7–3)}, 6–2

- It was Austin's 7th singles title of the year and the 17th of her career.

=== Doubles ===
(United States) Kathy Jordan / (United States) Anne Smith defeated (United States) Pam Shriver / (Netherlands) Betty Stöve 6–4, 6–1

== Prize money ==
Event	W	F	SF	QF	Round of 16	Round of 32	Round of 64
Singles	$22,000	$11,000	$5,000	$2,700	$1,350	$700	$325
