= 1978 Colgate International =

- Date: 19–24 June
- Edition: 4th
- Category: Colgate Series (AA)
- Draw: 64S / 32D
- Prize money: $75,000
- Surface: Grass / outdoor
- Location: Eastbourne, United Kingdom
- Venue: Devonshire Park

Champions

Singles
- (United States) Martina Navratilova

Doubles
- (United States) Chris Evert / (Netherlands) Betty Stöve
← 1976 ·	Eastbourne International	· 1979 →

The 1978 Colgate International was a women's tennis tournament played on outdoor grass courts at Devonshire Park in Eastbourne in the United Kingdom. The event was part of the AA (Note: Tournaments with prize money for the women of at least $75,000.) category of the 1978 Colgate Series. It was the fourth edition of the tournament and was held from 19 June through 24 June 1978. Second-seeded Martina Navratilova survived a match point in the 2h12m final against first-seeded Chris Evert to win the singles title and earn $14,000 first-prize money.

== Finals ==
=== Singles ===
(United States) Martina Navratilova defeated (United States) Chris Evert 6–4, 4–6, 9–7

- It was Navratilova's 8th singles title of the year and the 22nd of her career.

=== Doubles ===
(United States) Chris Evert / (Netherlands) Betty Stöve defeated (United States) Billie Jean King / (United States) Martina Navratilova 6–4, 6–7, 7–5

== Prize money ==
Event	W	F	SF	QF	Round of 16	Round of 32	Round of 64
Singles	$14,000	$7,000	$3,600	$1,800	$1,000	$550	$250

== See also ==
- Evert–Navratilova rivalry
