= 1981 BMW Championships =

Women's tennis tournament

- Date: 15–21 June
- Edition: 8th
- Category: Toyota Series
- Draw: 64S / 32D
- Prize money: $125,000
- Surface: Grass
- Location: Eastbourne, United Kingdom
- Venue: Devonshire Park

Champions

Singles
- (United States) Tracy Austin

Doubles
- (United States) Billie Jean King / (United States) Pam Shriver
← 1980 ·	Eastbourne International	· 1982 →

The 1981 BMW Championships was a women's tennis tournament played on outdoor grass courts at Devonshire Park in Eastbourne in the United Kingdom that was part of the Toyota Series category of the 1981 WTA Tour. It was the eighth edition of the tournament and was held from 15 June through 21 June 1981. First-seeded Tracy Austin won the singles title and earned $22,000 first-prize money.

== Finals ==
=== Singles ===
(United States) Tracy Austin defeated (United States) Andrea Jaeger 6–3, 6–4

- It was Austin's 2nd singles title of the year and the 23rd of her career.

=== Doubles ===
(United States) Martina Navratilova / (United States) Pam Shriver defeated (United States) Kathy Jordan / (United States) Anne Smith 6–7^{(5–7)}, 6–2, 6–1

== Prize money ==
Event	W	F	SF	QF	Round of 16	Round of 32	Round of 64
Singles	$22,000	$11,000	$5,000	$2,700	$1,350	$700	$325
