= 1988 Pilkington Glass Championships – Doubles =

Doubles
- 1988 Pilkington Glass Championships
- 1987 Champions: (Soviet Union) Svetlana Parkhomenko (Soviet Union) Larisa Savchenko

Final
- Champions: (West Germany) Eva Pfaff (Australia) Elizabeth Smylie
- Runners-up: (New Zealand) Belinda Cordwell (South Africa) Dianne van Rensburg
- Score: 6–3, 7–6

Events
Singles	Doubles
← 1987 ·	Pilkington Glass Championships	· 1989 →

Svetlana Parkhomenko and Larisa Savchenko were the defending champions but they competed with different partners that year, Parkhomenko with Leila Meskhi and Savchenko with Natasha Zvereva.

Meskhi and Parkhomenko lost in the second round to Belinda Cordwell and Dianne van Rensburg.

Savchenko and Zvereva lost in the semifinals to Eva Pfaff and Elizabeth Smylie.

Pfaff and Smylie won in the final 6–3, 7–6 against Cordwell and van Rensburg.

== Seeds ==
Champion seeds are indicated in bold text while text in italics indicates the round in which those seeds were eliminated.

1. (West Germany) Claudia Kohde-Kilsch / (Czechoslovakia) Helena Suková (second round)
2. (United States) Lori McNeil / (United States) Betsy Nagelsen (quarterfinals)
3. (United States) Gigi Fernández / (France) Catherine Suire (semifinals)
4. (West Germany) **Eva Pfaff** / (Australia) **Elizabeth Smylie (champions)**
5. (United States) Elise Burgin / (United States) Robin White (second round)
6. (United States) Katrina Adams / (United States) Zina Garrison (second round)
7. (South Africa) Rosalyn Fairbank / (Australia) Wendy Turnbull (quarterfinals)
8. (Soviet Union) Leila Meskhi / (Soviet Union) Svetlana Parkhomenko (second round)

== Draw ==
=== Key ===
- Q = Qualifier
- WC = Wild card
- LL = Lucky loser
- Alt = Alternate
- SE = Special exempt
- PR = Protected ranking
- ITF = ITF entry
- JE = Junior exempt
- w/o = Walkover
- r = Retired
- d = Defaulted
- SR = Special ranking

=== Final ===
Final
	(New Zealand) Belinda Cordwell (South Africa) Dianne van Rensburg	3	6
4	(West Germany) **Eva Pfaff** (Australia) **Elizabeth Smylie**	**6**	**7**

=== Top half ===
First round
1	(West Germany) **C Kohde-Kilsch** (Czechoslovakia) **H Suková**	**6**	4	**6**
(Sweden) M Lindström (West Germany) C Porwik	3	**6**	1
(United States) G Magers (United States) W White	3	3
(Sweden) **C Lindqvist** (Denmark) **T Scheuer-Larsen**	**6**	**6**
(United States) A Henricksson (Switzerland) C Jolissaint	4	3
(New Zealand) **B Cordwell** (South Africa) **D van Rensburg**	**6**	**6**
(Soviet Union) N Bykova (West Germany) C Singer	5	2
8	(Soviet Union) **L Meskhi** (Soviet Union) **S Parkhomenko**	**7**	**6**
3	(United States) **G Fernández** (France) **C Suire**	**6**	**7**
(United States) P Fendick (Canada) J Hetherington	3	6
(United States) **L Antonoplis** (United States) **B Gerken**	**6**	**6**
(United Kingdom) V Lake (United Kingdom) C Wood	2	0
(Canada) H Kelesi (France) C Tanvier	1	**6**	3
(Netherlands) **M Bollegraf** (Australia) **N Provis**	**6**	4	**6**
(Australia) R McQuillan (Australia) J-A Faull	2	1
5	(United States) **E Burgin** (United States) **R White**	**6**	**6**

Second round
1	(West Germany) C Kohde-Kilsch (Czechoslovakia) H Suková
(Sweden) **C Lindqvist** (Denmark) **T Scheuer-Larsen**	**w/o**
(New Zealand) **B Cordwell** (South Africa) **D van Rensburg**	**6**	3	**6**
8	(Soviet Union) L Meskhi (Soviet Union) S Parkhomenko	1	**6**	2
3	(United States) **G Fernández** (France) **C Suire**	6	**7**	**6**
(United States) L Antonoplis (United States) B Gerken	**7**	5	2
(Netherlands) **M Bollegraf** (Australia) **N Provis**	**6**	**6**
5	(United States) E Burgin (United States) R White	4	3

Quarterfinals
(Sweden) C Lindqvist (Denmark) T Scheuer-Larsen	**6**	6	3
(New Zealand) **B Cordwell** (South Africa) **D van Rensburg**	3	**7**	**6**
3	(United States) **G Fernández** (France) **C Suire**	**6**	**6**
(Netherlands) M Bollegraf (Australia) N Provis	0	1

Semifinals
(New Zealand) **B Cordwell** (South Africa) **D van Rensburg**	**6**	3	**9**
3	(United States) G Fernández (France) C Suire	2	**6**	7

=== Bottom half ===
First round
7	(South Africa) **R Fairbank** (Australia) **W Turnbull**	**6**	**6**
(France) I Demongeot (France) N Tauziat	4	3
(United States) Ca MacGregor (United States) Cy MacGregor	4	6
(France) **N Herreman** (France) **P Paradis**	**6**	**7**
(Australia) **J Byrne** (Australia) **J Tremelling**	**7**	**7**
(United States) T Phelps (Italy) R Reggi	6	5
(South Africa) L Gregory (United States) R Reis	1	4
4	(West Germany) **E Pfaff** (Australia) **E Smylie**	**6**	**6**
6	(United States) **K Adams** (United States) **Z Garrison**	**6**	**7**
(United Kingdom) J Durie (United States) S Walsh-Pete	4	6
(Soviet Union) **L Savchenko** (Soviet Union) **N Zvereva**	**6**	**7**
(Netherlands) I Driehuis (South Africa) E Reinach	0	6
(United States) **P Louie-Harper** (United States) **H Ludloff**	**6**	3	**6**
(United States) C Reynolds (United States) P Smith	2	**6**	3
(United Kingdom) S Gomer (United Kingdom) J Salmon	**7**	2	3
2	(United States) **L McNeil** (United States) **B Nagelsen**	6	**6**	**6**

Second round
7	(South Africa) **R Fairbank** (Australia) **W Turnbull**	**6**	**7**
(France) N Herreman (France) P Paradis	1	5
(Australia) J Byrne (Australia) J Tremelling	**6**	2	9
4	(West Germany) **E Pfaff** (Australia) **E Smylie**	4	**6**	**11**
6	(United States) K Adams (United States) Z Garrison	**6**	3	9
(Soviet Union) **L Savchenko** (Soviet Union) **N Zvereva**	3	**6**	**11**
(United States) P Louie-Harper (United States) H Ludloff	6	3
2	(United States) **L McNeil** (United States) **B Nagelsen**	**7**	**6**

Quarterfinals
7	(South Africa) R Fairbank (Australia) W Turnbull	4	4
4	(West Germany) **E Pfaff** (Australia) **E Smylie**	**6**	**6**
(Soviet Union) **L Savchenko** (Soviet Union) **N Zvereva**	**6**	**7**
2	(United States) L McNeil (United States) B Nagelsen	1	6

Semifinals
4	(West Germany) **E Pfaff** (Australia) **E Smylie**	**7**	**6**
(Soviet Union) L Savchenko (Soviet Union) N Zvereva	6	2
