= 1988 Pilkington Glass Championships – Singles =

Singles
- 1988 Pilkington Glass Championships
- 1987 Champion: (Czechoslovakia) Helena Suková

Final
- Champion: (United States) Martina Navratilova
- Runner-up: (Soviet Union) Natasha Zvereva
- Score: 6–2, 6–2

Events
Singles	Doubles
← 1987 ·	Pilkington Glass Championships	· 1989 →

Helena Suková was the defending champion but lost in the second round to Pascale Paradis.

Martina Navratilova won in the final 6–2, 6–2 against Natasha Zvereva.

== Seeds ==
A champion seed is indicated in bold text while text in italics indicates the round in which that seed was eliminated.

1. (United States) **Martina Navratilova (champion)**
2. (United States) Pam Shriver (third round)
3. (Argentina) Gabriela Sabatini (quarterfinals)
4. (Czechoslovakia) Helena Suková (second round)
5. (Soviet Union) Natasha Zvereva (final)
6. n/a
7. (United States) Lori McNeil (third round)
8. (West Germany) Claudia Kohde-Kilsch (third round)
9. (United States) Zina Garrison (third round)
10. (Soviet Union) Larisa Savchenko (quarterfinals)
11. (United States) Mary Joe Fernández (semifinals)
12. (United States) Barbara Potter (third round)
13. (Italy) Raffaella Reggi (third round)
14. (United States) Patty Fendick (first round)
15. (Sweden) Catarina Lindqvist (quarterfinals)
16. (Australia) Dianne Balestrat (third round)

== Draw ==
=== Key ===
- Q = Qualifier
- WC = Wild card
- LL = Lucky loser
- Alt = Alternate
- SE = Special exempt
- PR = Protected ranking
- ITF = ITF entry
- JE = Junior exempt
- w/o = Walkover
- r = Retired
- d = Defaulted
- SR = Special ranking

=== Finals ===
Semifinals
1	(United States) **Martina Navratilova**	**6**	**6**
11	(United States) Mary Joe Fernández	2	3
(France) Pascale Paradis	1	**6**	2
5	(Soviet Union) **Natasha Zvereva**	**6**	2	**6**

Final
1	(United States) **Martina Navratilova**	**6**	**6**
5	(Soviet Union) Natasha Zvereva	2	2

=== Top half ===
==== Section 1 ====
First round
1	(United States) **M Navratilova**	**6**	**6**
Q	(France) A Dechaume	0	2
(United Kingdom) **M Javer**	**6**	**6**
(Australia) N Provis	1	0
(United States) M Werdel	4	2
(South Africa) **E Reinach**	**6**	**6**
Q	(United States) H Ludloff	3	1
13	(Italy) **R Reggi**	**6**	**6**
10	(Soviet Union) **L Savchenko**	**6**	3	**6**
(France) N Tauziat	4	**6**	1
(Soviet Union) **S Parkhomenko**	**6**	**6**
(United States) E Hakami	3	0
(Australia) **E Smylie**	**6**	2	**6**
(United States) E Burgin	3	**6**	4
(United Kingdom) S Loosemore	2	6
8	(West Germany) **C Kohde-Kilsch**	**6**	**7**

Second round
1	(United States) **M Navratilova**	**6**	**6**
(United Kingdom) M Javer	2	1
(South Africa) E Reinach	6	**7**	4
13	(Italy) **R Reggi**	**7**	6	**6**
10	(Soviet Union) **L Savchenko**	**6**	**6**
(Soviet Union) S Parkhomenko	3	1
(Australia) E Smylie	3	0
8	(West Germany) **C Kohde-Kilsch**	**6**	**6**

Third round
1	(United States) **M Navratilova**	**6**	**6**
13	(Italy) R Reggi	0	2
10	(Soviet Union) **L Savchenko**	**6**	**4**
8	(West Germany) C Kohde-Kilsch	4	4	r

Quarterfinals
1	(United States) **M Navratilova**	**6**	**6**
10	(Soviet Union) L Savchenko	4	4

==== Section 2 ====
First round
3	(Argentina) **G Sabatini**	2	**6**	**6**
(United States) G Fernández	**6**	4	3
(United States) H Cioffi	2	2
Q	(France) **C Tanvier**	**6**	**6**
Q	(Australia) E Minter	6	**7**	0
(United Kingdom) **S Gomer**	**7**	6	**6**
Q	(Netherlands) I Driehuis	1	3
16	(Australia) **D Balestrat**	**6**	**6**
11	(United States) **M J Fernández**	**6**	4	**6**
(France) J Halard	0	**6**	4
(United States) **G Magers**	**6**	**6**
(United States) P Louie-Harper	3	1
(South Africa) K Schimper	3	3
(United Kingdom) **J Durie**	**6**	**6**
(Netherlands) H Witvoet	4	5
9	(United States) **Z Garrison**	**6**	**7**

Second round
3	(Argentina) **G Sabatini**	**6**	**4**
Q	(France) C Tanvier	4	1	r
(United Kingdom) S Gomer	1	1
16	(Australia) **D Balestrat**	**6**	**6**
11	(United States) **M J Fernández**	**6**	**6**
(United States) G Magers	4	3
(United Kingdom) J Durie	4	6
9	(United States) **Z Garrison**	**6**	**7**

Third round
3	(Argentina) **G Sabatini**	4	**6**	**6**
16	(Australia) D Balestrat	**6**	1	3
11	(United States) **M J Fernández**	**6**	3	**6**
9	(United States) Z Garrison	3	**6**	0

Quarterfinals
3	(Argentina) G Sabatini	2	5
11	(United States) **M J Fernández**	**6**	**7**

=== Bottom half ===
==== Section 3 ====
First round
7	(United States) **L McNeil**	**6**	**6**
Q	(France) C Suire	2	4
(Netherlands) B Schultz	3	**6**	2
Q	(South Africa) **D Van Rensburg**	**6**	3	**6**
(Australia) **W Turnbull**	**6**	6	**6**
(United States) H Na	2	**7**	3
(United States) B Gerken	2	0
(Australia) **A Minter**	**6**	**6**
14	(United States) P Fendick	4	**6**	1
(France) **N Herreman**	**6**	1	**6**
(Canada) J Hetherington	2	6
(United States) **A Henricksson**	**6**	**7**
(France) **P Paradis**	**6**	**6**
(United Kingdom) C Wood	1	3
(New Zealand) B Cordwell	1	3
4	(Czechoslovakia) **H Suková**	**6**	**6**

Second round
7	(United States) **L McNeil**	**6**	4	**6**
Q	(South Africa) D Van Rensburg	1	**6**	4
(Australia) W Turnbull	3	2
(Australia) **A Minter**	**6**	**6**
(France) N Herreman	**6**	1	4
(United States) **A Henricksson**	4	**6**	**6**
(France) **P Paradis**	**6**	**6**
4	(Czechoslovakia) H Suková	2	3

Third round
7	(United States) L McNeil	3	2
(Australia) **A Minter**	**6**	**6**
(United States) A Henricksson	2	3
(France) **P Paradis**	**6**	**6**

Quarterfinals
(Australia) A Minter	4	3
(France) **P Paradis**	**6**	**6**

==== Section 4 ====
First round
5	(Soviet Union) **N Zvereva**	**6**	**6**
(United States) T Phelps	1	2
Q	(United States) C Benjamin	4	3
(West Germany) **C Porwik**	**6**	**6**
(United States) W White	2	6
(South Africa) **R Fairbank**	**6**	**7**
(Japan) A Kijimuta	4	1
12	(United States) **B Potter**	**6**	**6**
15	(Sweden) **C Lindqvist**	**6**	**6**
(Japan) E Inoue	4	4
(Poland) **I Kuczyńska**	**6**	**6**
(United Kingdom) V Lake	2	2
(Soviet Union) L Meskhi	4	**7**	4
(United States) **R White**	**6**	5	**6**
(France) I Demongeot	**6**	5	2
2	(United States) **P Shriver**	4	**7**	**6**

Second round
5	(Soviet Union) **N Zvereva**	**6**	**6**
(West Germany) C Porwik	3	0
(South Africa) R Fairbank	5	**6**	4
12	(United States) **B Potter**	**7**	2	**6**
15	(Sweden) **C Lindqvist**	**6**	**6**
(Poland) I Kuczyńska	0	3
(United States) R White	4	**6**	3
2	(United States) **P Shriver**	**6**	2	**6**

Third round
5	(Soviet Union) **N Zvereva**	**6**	**7**
12	(United States) B Potter	3	5
15	(Sweden) **C Lindqvist**	**w/o**
2	(United States) P Shriver

Quarterfinals
5	(Soviet Union) **N Zvereva**	**6**	0	**6**
15	(Sweden) C Lindqvist	4	**6**	2
