= 1989 Pilkington Glass Championships – Singles =

Singles
- 1989 Pilkington Glass Championships
- 1988 Champion: (United States) Martina Navratilova

Final
- Champion: (United States) Martina Navratilova
- Runner-up: (Italy) Raffaella Reggi
- Score: 7–6, 6–2

Events
Singles	Doubles
← 1988 ·	Pilkington Glass Championships	· 1990 →

Martina Navratilova was the defending champion and won in the final 7–6, 6–2 against Raffaella Reggi.

== Seeds ==
A champion seed is indicated in bold text while text in italics indicates the round in which that seed was eliminated.

1. (United States) **Martina Navratilova (champion)**
2. (United States) Chris Evert (third round)
3. (United States) Zina Garrison (third round)
4. (Czechoslovakia) Helena Suková (third round)
5. (Soviet Union) Natasha Zvereva (first round)
6. (United States) Lori McNeil (first round)
7. (United States) Mary Joe Fernández (quarterfinals)
8. (West Germany) Claudia Kohde-Kilsch (second round)
9. (Australia) Hana Mandlíková (first round)
10. (United States) Patty Fendick (first round)
11. (Sweden) Catarina Lindqvist (second round)
12. (France) Nathalie Tauziat (third round)
13. (Soviet Union) Larisa Savchenko (third round)
14. (Italy) Raffaella Reggi (final)
15. (Australia) Anne Minter (first round)
16. (South Africa) Rosalyn Fairbank (semifinals)

== Draw ==
=== Key ===
- Q = Qualifier
- WC = Wild card
- LL = Lucky loser
- Alt = Alternate
- SE = Special exempt
- PR = Protected ranking
- ITF = ITF entry
- JE = Junior exempt
- w/o = Walkover
- r = Retired
- d = Defaulted
- SR = Special ranking

=== Finals ===
Semifinals
1	(United States) **Martina Navratilova**	**6**	**6**
16	(South Africa) Rosalyn Fairbank	3	2
(United States) Gigi Fernández	4	2
14	(Italy) **Raffaella Reggi**	**6**	**6**

Final
1	(United States) **Martina Navratilova**	**7**	**6**
14	(Italy) Raffaella Reggi	6	2

=== Top half ===
==== Section 1 ====
First round
1	(United States) **M Navratilova**	**6**	**6**
(United Kingdom) J Durie	1	2
(United States) **R Reis**	**6**	**6**
(Netherlands) M Bollegraf	3	2
Q	(South Africa) **R Field**	**6**	**6**
(United States) D Faber	2	4
(France) P Paradis	5	2
13	(Soviet Union) **L Savchenko**	**7**	**6**
12	(France) **N Tauziat**	**6**	**7**
(United States) A Henricksson	4	6
Q	(United States) **C Benjamin**	**6**	3	**6**
(United States) E Burgin	4	**6**	4
Q	(United Kingdom) **A Simpkin**	**7**	**6**
(United Kingdom) J Salmon	5	1
(South Africa) E Reinach	6	2
7	(United States) **M J Fernández**	**7**	**6**

Second round
1	(United States) **M Navratilova**	**6**	**6**
(United States) R Reis	0	2
Q	(South Africa) R Field	2	5
13	(Soviet Union) **L Savchenko**	**6**	**7**
12	(France) **N Tauziat**	**6**	**6**
Q	(United States) C Benjamin	2	3
Q	(United Kingdom) A Simpkin	1	3
7	(United States) **M J Fernández**	**6**	**6**

Third round
1	(United States) **M Navratilova**	**6**	**6**
13	(Soviet Union) L Savchenko	3	0
12	(France) N Tauziat	3	4
7	(United States) **M J Fernández**	**6**	**6**

Quarterfinals
1	(United States) **M Navratilova**	**7**	**6**
7	(United States) M J Fernández	6	1

==== Section 2 ====
First round
4	(Czechoslovakia) **H Suková**	**6**	**6**
(United Kingdom) A Grunfeld	4	4
(United States) **R White**	**6**	**6**
(United States) M Van Nostrand	3	0
(West Germany) E Pfaff	4	0
(United States) **G Magers**	**6**	**6**
(United States) K Adams	1	2
16	(South Africa) **R Fairbank**	**6**	**6**
9	(Australia) H Mandlíková	6	4
(France) **C Tanvier**	**7**	**6**
(United States) **W White**	**7**	**6**
(United States) A Grossman	6	1
(United States) **M Louie-Harper**	**6**	4	**6**
LL	(Australia) J-A Faull	1	**6**	1
(United States) **B Nagelsen**	**6**	1	**6**
6	(United States) L McNeil	2	**6**	1

Second round
4	(Czechoslovakia) **H Suková**	**6**	**6**
(United States) R White	4	4
(United States) G Magers	3	5
16	(South Africa) **R Fairbank**	**6**	**7**
(France) **C Tanvier**	**7**	**6**
(United States) W White	6	2
(United States) M Louie-Harper	**6**	1	4
(United States) **B Nagelsen**	4	**6**	**6**

Third round
4	(Czechoslovakia) H Suková	2	3
16	(South Africa) **R Fairbank**	**6**	**6**
(France) C Tanvier	4	**6**	1
(United States) **B Nagelsen**	**6**	1	**6**

Quarterfinals
16	(South Africa) **R Fairbank**	**6**	**6**
(United States) B Nagelsen	3	0

=== Bottom half ===
==== Section 3 ====
First round
5	(Soviet Union) N Zvereva	6	3
Q	(Australia) **E Smylie**	**7**	**6**
(Japan) K Okamoto	0	1
(Netherlands) **B Schultz**	**6**	**6**
(United States) **G Fernández**	**6**	**6**
(France) N Herreman	0	4
(France) **I Demongeot**	**6**	**6**
10	(United States) P Fendick	2	1
15	(Australia) A Minter	2	**6**	4
(Australia) **J Byrne**	**6**	4	**6**
(Japan) **E Inoue**	**6**	**7**
Q	(United Kingdom) B Borneo	3	5
Q	(United States) H Ludloff	4	3
(Australia) **D Balestrat**	**6**	**6**
Q	(Australia) J Tremelling	2	r
3	(United States) **Z Garrison**	**6**

Second round
Q	(Australia) **E Smylie**	3	**6**	**6**
(Netherlands) B Schultz	**6**	4	4
(United States) **G Fernández**	**6**	**6**
(France) I Demongeot	1	3
(Australia) J Byrne	**7**	4	1
(Japan) **E Inoue**	5	**6**	**6**
(Australia) D Balestrat	2	4
3	(United States) **Z Garrison**	**6**	**6**

Third round
Q	(Australia) E Smylie	2	2
(United States) **G Fernández**	**6**	**6**
(Japan) **E Inoue**	4	**6**	**9**
3	(United States) Z Garrison	**6**	4	7

Quarterfinals
(United States) **G Fernández**	**6**	**6**
(Japan) E Inoue	2	4

==== Section 4 ====
First round
8	(West Germany) **C Kohde-Kilsch**	**6**	6	**7**
(South Africa) D Van Rensburg	2	**7**	5
(United Kingdom) A Hobbs	4	**7**	4
(Japan) **A Kijimuta**	**6**	5	**6**
(Australia) N Provis	2	2
(United States) **S Stafford**	**6**	**6**
(United Kingdom) C Wood	4	1
11	(Sweden) **C Lindqvist**	**6**	**6**
14	(Italy) **R Reggi**	**7**	2	**6**
(United States) E Hakami	5	**6**	0
(Italy) **L Golarsa**	**6**	3	**6**
(United Kingdom) M Javer	2	**6**	3
(United Kingdom) **S Gomer**	**6**	4	**6**
Q	(France) K Quentrec	3	**6**	2
(Poland) I Kuczyńska	2	3
2	(United States) **C Evert**	**6**	**6**

Second round
8	(West Germany) C Kohde-Kilsch	4	3
(Japan) **A Kijimuta**	**6**	**6**
(United States) **S Stafford**	**6**	2	**6**
11	(Sweden) C Lindqvist	0	**6**	4
14	(Italy) **R Reggi**	3	**6**	**7**
(Italy) L Golarsa	**6**	3	5
(United Kingdom) S Gomer	2	0
2	(United States) **C Evert**	**6**	**6**

Third round
(Japan) **A Kijimuta**	**6**	**6**
(United States) S Stafford	4	3
14	(Italy) **R Reggi**	**w/o**
2	(United States) C Evert

Quarterfinals
(Japan) A Kijimuta	2	**6**	1
14	(Italy) **R Reggi**	**6**	4	**6**
