= 1990 Pilkington Glass Championships – Doubles =

Doubles
- 1990 Pilkington Glass Championships

Final
- Champions: (Soviet Union) Larisa Savchenko-Neiland (Soviet Union) Natasha Zvereva
- Runners-up: (United States) Patty Fendick (United States) Zina Garrison
- Score: 6–4, 6–3

Details
- Draw: 32
- Seeds: 8

Events
Singles	Doubles
← 1989 ·	Eastbourne International	· 1991 →

Katrina Adams and Zina Garrison were the defending champions, but competed this year with different partners.

Adams teamed up with Lori McNeil and lost in the second round to Helen Kelesi and Andrea Temesvári.

Garrison teamed up with Patty Fendick and lost in the final to Larisa Savchenko-Neiland and Natasha Zvereva. The score was 6–4, 6–3.

== Seeds ==
1. (Czechoslovakia) Jana Novotná / (Czechoslovakia) Helena Suková (second round, withdrew)
2. (United States) Gigi Fernández / (United States) Martina Navratilova (semifinals)
3. (Soviet Union) Larisa Savchenko-Neiland / (Soviet Union) Natasha Zvereva (champions)
4. (Australia) Nicole Provis / (South Africa) Elna Reinach (quarterfinals)
5. (United States) Kathy Jordan / (Australia) Elizabeth Smylie (semifinals)
6. (United States) Mary Joe Fernández / (United States) Betsy Nagelsen (first round, withdrew)
7. (United States) Katrina Adams / (United States) Lori McNeil (second round)
8. (United States) Patty Fendick / (United States) Zina Garrison-Jackson (final)

== Draw ==
=== Key ===
- Q = Qualifier
- WC = Wild card
- LL = Lucky loser
- Alt = Alternate
- SE = Special exempt
- PR = Protected ranking
- ITF = ITF entry
- JE = Junior exempt
- w/o = Walkover
- r = Retired
- d = Defaulted
- SR = Special ranking

=== Finals ===
Semifinals
8	(United States) Patty Fendick (United States) Zina Garrison-Jackson	7	6
5	(United States) Kathy Jordan (Australia) Elizabeth Smylie	5	1
3	(Soviet Union) Larisa Savchenko-Neiland (Soviet Union) Natasha Zvereva	7	7
2	(United States) Gigi Fernández (United States) Martina Navratilova	6	6

Final
8	(United States) Patty Fendick (United States) Zina Garrison-Jackson	4	3
3	(Soviet Union) Larisa Savchenko-Neiland (Soviet Union) Natasha Zvereva	6	6

=== Top half ===
First round
1	(Czechoslovakia) J Novotná (Czechoslovakia) H Suková	6	6
(Australia) A Minter (Austria) B Paulus	3	2
(Canada) J Hetherington (United States) R White	6	6	6
(Spain) A Sánchez Vicario (Netherlands) B Schultz	4	7	3
(Netherlands) M Bollegraf (West Germany) C Kohde-Kilsch	7	6
(Sweden) M Lindström (United States) H Ludloff	5	2
(United States) E Burgin (South Africa) R Fairbank-Nideffer	0	6	3
8	(United States) P Fendick (United States) Z Garrison-Jackson	6	4	6
4	(Australia) N Provis (South Africa) E Reinach	6	6
(France) N Herreman (West Germany) C Porwik	3	4
(United Kingdom) B Borneo (United Kingdom) C Wood	6	6
(United States) P Louie Harper (United States) P Barg-Mager	4	3
(United States) S Collins (United States) J Smoller	4	6	2
(United States) J Capriati (United States) M McGrath	6	4	6
(France) I Demongeot (France) C Tanvier	3	6
5	(United States) K Jordan (Australia) E Smylie	6	7

Second round
1	(Czechoslovakia) J Novotná (Czechoslovakia) H Suková
(Canada) J Hetherington (United States) R White	w/o
(Netherlands) M Bollegraf (West Germany) C Kohde-Kilsch
8	(United States) P Fendick (United States) Z Garrison-Jackson	w/o
4	(Australia) N Provis (South Africa) E Reinach	6	6
(United Kingdom) B Borneo (United Kingdom) C Wood	3	3
(United States) J Capriati (United States) M McGrath	2	4
5	(United States) K Jordan (Australia) E Smylie	6	6

Quarterfinals
(Canada) J Hetherington (United States) R White	3	3
8	(United States) P Fendick (United States) Z Garrison-Jackson	6	6
4	(Australia) N Provis (South Africa) E Reinach	2	2
5	(United States) K Jordan (Australia) E Smylie	6	6

Semifinals
8	(United States) P Fendick (United States) Z Garrison-Jackson	7	6
5	(United States) K Jordan (Australia) E Smylie	5	1

=== Bottom half ===
First round
6	(United States) MJ Fernández (United States) B Nagelsen
(South Africa) L Gregory (United States) G Magers	w/o
(France) N Tauziat (Austria) J Wiesner	7	4	4
(Soviet Union) N Medvedeva (Soviet Union) L Meskhi	6	6	6
(South Africa) L Barnard (Australia) L Field	4	6	8
(United Kingdom) M Javer (United Kingdom) S Smith	6	4	6
(United Kingdom) J Durie (New Zealand) J Richardson	6	2	1
3	(Soviet Union) L Savchenko-Neiland (Soviet Union) N Zvereva	1	6	6
7	(United States) K Adams (United States) L McNeil	6	6
(Italy) L Garrone (Italy) L Golarsa	3	2
(Canada) H Kelesi (Hungary) A Temesvári	4	7	8
(Australia) JA Faull (Australia) R McQuillan	6	5	6
(United States) Ca MacGregor (United States) Cy MacGregor	6	2
(United States) A Smith (Australia) W Turnbull	7	6
(Italy) L Ferrando (Italy) R Reggi	1	6	0
2	(United States) G Fernández (United States) M Navratilova	6	3	6

Second round
(South Africa) L Gregory (United States) G Magers	6	3	6
(Soviet Union) N Medvedeva (Soviet Union) L Meskhi	3	6	2
(South Africa) L Barnard (Australia) L Field	1	2
3	(Soviet Union) L Savchenko-Neiland (Soviet Union) N Zvereva	6	6
7	(United States) K Adams (United States) L McNeil	1	2
(Canada) H Kelesi (Hungary) A Temesvári	6	6
(United States) A Smith (Australia) W Turnbull	1	6
2	(United States) G Fernández (United States) M Navratilova	6	7

Quarterfinals
(South Africa) L Gregory (United States) G Magers	4	2
3	(Soviet Union) L Savchenko-Neiland (Soviet Union) N Zvereva	6	6
(Canada) H Kelesi (Hungary) A Temesvári	2	4
2	(United States) G Fernández (United States) M Navratilova	6	6

Semifinals
3	(Soviet Union) L Savchenko-Neiland (Soviet Union) N Zvereva	7	7
2	(United States) G Fernández (United States) M Navratilova	6	6
