= 1989 Pilkington Glass Championships – Doubles =

Doubles
- 1989 Pilkington Glass Championships

Final
- Champions: (United States) Katrina Adams (United States) Zina Garrison
- Runners-up: (Czechoslovakia) Jana Novotná (Czechoslovakia) Helena Suková
- Score: 6–3 (Novotná and Suková retired)

Details
- Seeds: 8

Events
Singles	Doubles
← 1988 ·	Pilkington Glass Championships	· 1990 →

Eva Pfaff and Elizabeth Smylie were the defending champions but they competed with different partners that year, Pfaff with Manon Bollegraf and Smylie with Wendy Turnbull.

Bollegraf and Pfaff lost in the first round to Beth Herr and Candy Reynolds.

Smylie and Turnbull lost in the quarterfinals to Jana Novotná and Helena Suková.

Katrina Adams and Zina Garrison won the final 6–3 after Novotná and Suková were forced to retire.

== Seeds ==
Champion seeds are indicated in bold text while text in italics indicates the round in which those seeds were eliminated.

1. (United States) Martina Navratilova / (Soviet Union) Larisa Savchenko (semifinals)
2. (Czechoslovakia) Jana Novotná / (Czechoslovakia) Helena Suková (final)
3. (United States) Patty Fendick / (Canada) Jill Hetherington (quarterfinals)
4. (United States) Gigi Fernández / (United States) Lori McNeil (quarterfinals)
5. (United States) **Katrina Adams** / (United States) **Zina Garrison (champions)**
6. (Australia) Elizabeth Smylie / (Australia) Wendy Turnbull (quarterfinals)
7. (United States) Elise Burgin / (South Africa) Rosalyn Fairbank (first round)
8. (Netherlands) Manon Bollegraf / (West Germany) Eva Pfaff (first round)

== Draw ==
=== Key ===
- Q = Qualifier
- WC = Wild card
- LL = Lucky loser
- Alt = Alternate
- SE = Special exempt
- PR = Protected ranking
- ITF = ITF entry
- JE = Junior exempt
- w/o = Walkover
- r = Retired
- d = Defaulted
- SR = Special ranking

=== Final ===
Final
5	(United States) **Katrina Adams** (United States) **Zina Garrison**	**6**	0
2	(Czechoslovakia) Jana Novotná (Czechoslovakia) Helena Suková	3	0^{r}

=== Top half ===
First round
1	(United States) **M Navratilova** (Soviet Union) **L Savchenko**	**6**	**6**
(Australia) J Byrne (United States) R White	1	1
(West Germany) B Bunge (Sweden) C Lindqvist	4	2
(South Africa) **R Field** (United States) **C MacGregor**	**6**	**6**
(France) **N Herreman** (United States) **J Smoller**	**6**	**6**
(United States) R Casals (United States) S Walsh-Pete	2	1
(Australia) **N Provis** (South Africa) **E Reinach**	6	**7**	**7**
7	(United States) E Burgin (South Africa) R Fairbank	**7**	6	5
4	(United States) **G Fernández** (United States) **L McNeil**	5	**6**	**6**
(Netherlands) B Schultz (Hungary) A Temesvári	**7**	2	2
(Australia) **J-A Faull** (Italy) **R Reggi**	2	**6**	**6**
(United Kingdom) S Gomer (United Kingdom) J Salmon	**6**	3	3
(United Kingdom) **J Durie** (United States) **M J Fernández**	**6**	**6**
(United Kingdom) A Hobbs (France) C Suire	1	1
(Spain) A Sánchez Vicario (Soviet Union) N Zvereva	4	1
5	(United States) **K Adams** (United States) **Z Garrison**	**6**	**6**

Second round
1	(United States) **M Navratilova** (Soviet Union) **L Savchenko**	**6**	**7**
(South Africa) R Field (United States) C MacGregor	3	5
(France) N Herreman (United States) J Smoller	2	3
(Australia) **N Provis** (South Africa) **E Reinach**	**6**	**6**
4	(United States) **G Fernández** (United States) **L McNeil**	**6**	**6**
(Australia) J-A Faull (Italy) R Reggi	0	3
(United Kingdom) J Durie (United States) M J Fernández	2	**6**	2
5	(United States) **K Adams** (United States) **Z Garrison**	**6**	3	**6**

Quarterfinals
1	(United States) **M Navratilova** (Soviet Union) **L Savchenko**	**6**	**6**
(Australia) N Provis (South Africa) E Reinach	2	2
4	(United States) G Fernández (United States) L McNeil	3	5
5	(United States) **K Adams** (United States) **Z Garrison**	**6**	**7**

Semifinals
1	(United States) M Navratilova (Soviet Union) L Savchenko	3	**6**	7
5	(United States) **K Adams** (United States) **Z Garrison**	**6**	3	**9**

=== Bottom half ===
First round
8	(Netherlands) M Bollegraf (West Germany) E Pfaff	1	**6**	3
(United States) **B Herr** (United States) **C Reynolds**	**6**	4	**6**
(United States) P Barg (United States) R Reis	2	6
(United States) **C Benjamin** (South Africa) **K Schimper**	**6**	**7**
(United States) **L Antonoplis** (United States) **M Van Nostrand**	**7**	**6**
(West Germany) C Kohde-Kilsch (West Germany) C Porwik	6	0
(United States) M Louie-Harper (United States) W White	3	**6**	4
3	(United States) **P Fendick** (Canada) **J Hetherington**	**6**	4	**6**
6	(Australia) **E Smylie** (Australia) **W Turnbull**	**6**	1	**6**
(Australia) D Balestrat (Poland) I Kuczyńska	0	**6**	4
(Denmark) T Scheuer-Larsen (France) C Tanvier	4	4
(United States) **A Henricksson** (New Zealand) **J Richardson**	**6**	**6**
(South Africa) **L Gregory** (United States) **G Magers**	**6**	**6**
(Australia) H Mandlíková (United States) B Potter	4	4
(France) I Demongeot (France) N Tauziat	2	4
2	(Czechoslovakia) **J Novotná** (Czechoslovakia) **H Suková**	**6**	**6**

Second round
(United States) **B Herr** (United States) **C Reynolds**	**7**	4	**6**
(United States) C Benjamin (South Africa) K Schimper	5	**6**	3
(United States) L Antonoplis (United States) M Van Nostrand	2	**7**	1
3	(United States) **P Fendick** (Canada) **J Hetherington**	**6**	6	**6**
6	(Australia) **E Smylie** (Australia) **W Turnbull**	3	**6**	**12**
(United States) A Henricksson (New Zealand) J Richardson	**6**	2	10
(South Africa) L Gregory (United States) G Magers	2	0
2	(Czechoslovakia) **J Novotná** (Czechoslovakia) **H Suková**	**6**	**6**

Quarterfinals
(United States) **B Herr** (United States) **C Reynolds**	**6**	**7**
3	(United States) P Fendick (Canada) J Hetherington	1	6
6	(Australia) E Smylie (Australia) W Turnbull	**7**	4	7
2	(Czechoslovakia) **J Novotná** (Czechoslovakia) **H Suková**	6	**6**	**9**

Semifinals
(United States) B Herr (United States) C Reynolds	2	**7**	3
2	(Czechoslovakia) **J Novotná** (Czechoslovakia) **H Suková**	**6**	6	**6**
