= 1992 Pilkington Glass Championships =

- Date: 15–20 June
- Edition: 18th
- Category: Tier II
- Draw: 64S / 32D
- Prize money: $350,000
- Surface: Grass
- Location: Eastbourne, United Kingdom
- Venue: Devonshire Park Lawn Tennis Club

Champions

Singles
- (United States) Lori McNeil

Doubles
- (Czechoslovakia) Jana Novotná / (Latvia) Larisa Savchenko-Neiland
- Eastbourne International

The 1992 Pilkington Glass Championships was a women's tennis tournament played on grass courts at the Devonshire Park Lawn Tennis Club in Eastbourne in the United Kingdom that was part of Tier II of the 1992 WTA Tour. It was the 18th edition of the tournament and was held from 15 June until 20 June 1992. Lori McNeil, seeded 11th, won the singles title and earned $70,000 first-prize money.

== Finals ==
=== Singles ===
(United States) Lori McNeil defeated (United States) Linda Harvey-Wild 6–4, 6–4.

- It was McNeil's first singles title of the year and the eighth of her career.

=== Doubles ===
(Czechoslovakia) Jana Novotná / (Latvia) Larisa Savchenko-Neiland defeated (United States) Mary Joe Fernández / (United States) Zina Garrison 6–0, 6–3.

- It was Novotná's third doubles title of the year and the 36th of her career. It was Savchenko-Neiland's fifth doubles title of the year and the 34th of her career.
