= 1990 Pilkington Glass Championships – Singles =

Singles
- 1990 Pilkington Glass Championships

Final
- Champion: (United States) Martina Navratilova
- Runner-up: (United States) Gretchen Magers
- Score: 6–0, 6–2

Details
- Draw: 64 (4WC/8Q)
- Seeds: 16

Events
Singles	Doubles
← 1989 ·	Eastbourne International	· 1991 →

Martina Navratilova won her third consecutive title, and her ninth overall title at Eastbourne, by defeating Gretchen Magers 6–0, 6–2 in the final.

== Seeds ==
1. (United States) Martina Navratilova (champion)
2. (United States) Zina Garrison (second round)
3. (United States) Mary Joe Fernández (quarterfinals, retired)
4. (Czechoslovakia) Helena Suková (quarterfinals)
5. (Soviet Union) Natasha Zvereva (quarterfinals)
6. (United States) Jennifer Capriati (second round)
7. (Czechoslovakia) Jana Novotná (semifinals)
8. (Austria) Barbara Paulus (first round)
9. (France) Nathalie Tauziat (third round)
10. (United States) Amy Frazier (second round)
11. (South Africa) Rosalyn Fairbank-Nideffer (third round)
12. (Italy) Raffaella Reggi (second round)
13. (United States) Gigi Fernández (first round)
14. (Soviet Union) Leila Meskhi (third round)
15. (Sweden) Catarina Lindqvist (second round)
16. (West Germany) Claudia Porwik (first round)

== Draw ==
=== Key ===
- Q = Qualifier
- WC = Wild card
- LL = Lucky loser
- Alt = Alternate
- SE = Special exempt
- PR = Protected ranking
- ITF = ITF entry
- JE = Junior exempt
- w/o = Walkover
- r = Retired
- d = Defaulted
- SR = Special ranking

=== Finals ===
Quarterfinals
1	(United States) Martina Navratilova	7^{7}	6
5	(Soviet Union) Natasha Zvereva	6^{5}	1
4	(Czechoslovakia) Helena Suková	5	4
7	(Czechoslovakia) Jana Novotná	7	6
(United States) Gretchen Magers	6	2
3	(United States) Mary Joe Fernández	2	2^{r}
(Netherlands) Manon Bollegraf	3	1^{r}
(United States) Lori McNeil	6	1

Semifinals
1	(United States) Martina Navratilova	7^{7}	3	6
7	(Czechoslovakia) Jana Novotná	6^{3}	6	3
(United States) Gretchen Magers	7^{8}	6
(United States) Lori McNeil	6^{6}	2

Final
1	(United States) Martina Navratilova	6	6
(United States) Gretchen Magers	0	2

=== Top half ===
==== Section 1 ====
First round
1	(United States) M Navratilova	6	6
Q	(United States) C Benjamin	2	1
(Australia) JA Faull	4	4
(Australia) A Minter	6	6
(Mexico) A Gavaldón	4	1
WC	(United Kingdom) S Smith	6	6
(Australia) H Mandlíková	5	2
12	(Italy) R Reggi	7	6
9	(France) N Tauziat	6	7
(United Kingdom) S Loosemore	1	5
(Australia) N Provis	6	6
(West Germany) C Kohde-Kilsch	1	1
(Italy) L Ferrando	6	3	2
(United States) B Nagelsen	2	6	6
(Japan) N Sawamatsu	4	1
5	(Soviet Union) N Zvereva	6	6

Second round
1	(United States) M Navratilova	6	6
(Australia) A Minter	2	3
WC	(United Kingdom) S Smith	2	7^{9}	6
12	(Italy) R Reggi	6	6^{7}	4
9	(France) N Tauziat	4	6	6
(Australia) N Provis	6	3	0
(United States) B Nagelsen	5	6^{1}
5	(Soviet Union) N Zvereva	7	7^{7}

Third round
1	(United States) M Navratilova	6	6
WC	(United Kingdom) S Smith	3	2
9	(France) N Tauziat	2	0
5	(Soviet Union) N Zvereva	6	6

Quarterfinals
1	(United States) M Navratilova	7^{7}	6
5	(Soviet Union) N Zvereva	6^{5}	1

==== Section 2 ====
First round
4	(Czechoslovakia) H Suková	6	6
(South Africa) D Van Rensburg	4	2
(South Africa) E Reinach	7	4	6
Q	(United States) P Louie Harper	5	6	0
(Netherlands) B Schultz	5	2
(United States) R White	7	6
(Japan) M Kidowaki	3	2
15	(Sweden) C Lindqvist	6	6
14	(Soviet Union) L Meskhi	6	6
(United States) D Faber	2	2
(France) K Quentrec	6	6
Q	(France) N Herreman	3	1
WC	(United Kingdom) M Javer	6	5	6
Q	(United Kingdom) J Salmon	2	7	2
Q	(Australia) L Field	4	2
7	(Czechoslovakia) J Novotná	6	6

Second round
4	(Czechoslovakia) H Suková	6	6
(South Africa) E Reinach	4	3
(United States) R White	6	7
15	(Sweden) C Lindqvist	2	5
14	(Soviet Union) L Meskhi	6	2	7
(France) K Quentrec	2	6	5
WC	(United Kingdom) M Javer	2	2
7	(Czechoslovakia) J Novotná	6	6

Third round
4	(Czechoslovakia) H Suková	6	6
(United States) R White	3	3
14	(Soviet Union) L Meskhi	4	1
7	(Czechoslovakia) J Novotná	6	6

Quarterfinals
4	(Czechoslovakia) H Suková	5	4
7	(Czechoslovakia) J Novotná	7	6

=== Bottom half ===
==== Section 3 ====
First round
6	(United States) J Capriati	6	7
(United States) A Smith	3	5
(Australia) E Smylie	1	6^{5}
(United States) G Magers	6	7^{7}
WC	(United Kingdom) C Wood	3	4
WC	(United Kingdom) J Durie	6	6
Q	(United Kingdom) S Gomer	2	7^{7}	9
13	(United States) G Fernández	6	6^{1}	7
10	(United States) A Frazier	2	6	6
(France) J Halard	6	2	4
(Japan) N Miyagi	2	3
(Soviet Union) N Medvedeva	6	6
(France) I Demongeot	5	3
(United States) P Fendick	7	6
Q	(France) C Tanvier	4	1
3	(United States) MJ Fernández	6	6

Second round
6	(United States) J Capriati	6	4	2
(United States) G Magers	2	6	6
WC	(United Kingdom) J Durie	7	6
Q	(United Kingdom) S Gomer	5	0
10	(United States) A Frazier	5	6^{3}
(Soviet Union) N Medvedeva	7	7^{7}
(United States) P Fendick	7^{7}	6^{3}	0^{r}
3	(United States) MJ Fernández	6^{1}	7^{7}	3

Third round
(United States) G Magers	6	3	6
WC	(United Kingdom) J Durie	4	6	3
(Soviet Union) N Medvedeva	1	3
3	(United States) MJ Fernández	6	6

Quarterfinals
(United States) G Magers	6	2
3	(United States) MJ Fernández	2	2^{r}

==== Section 4 ====
First round
8	(Austria) B Paulus	5	6	3
(Netherlands) M Bollegraf	7	3	6
Q	(France) S Amiach	4	3
(Australia) R McQuillan	6	6
(United States) A Henricksson	2	3
(Soviet Union) L Savchenko	6	6
(Japan) E Inoue	1	1
11	(South Africa) R Fairbank-Nideffer	6	6
16	(West Germany) C Porwik	6	2	6^{2}
(United States) L McNeil	4	6	7^{7}
(Sweden) C Dahlman	7^{7}	7^{7}
(United States) T Phelps	6^{4}	6^{5}
(Italy) L Golarsa	6	5	6
(United States) S Stafford	4	7	0
(United States) E Burgin	1	0^{r}
2	(United States) Z Garrison	6	4

Second round
(Netherlands) M Bollegraf	6	6
(Australia) R McQuillan	3	0
(Soviet Union) L Savchenko	2	2
11	(South Africa) R Fairbank-Nideffer	6	6
(United States) L McNeil	6	6
(Sweden) C Dahlman	1	2
(Italy) L Golarsa	6	7
2	(United States) Z Garrison	2	5

Third round
(Netherlands) M Bollegraf	7	6
11	(South Africa) R Fairbank-Nideffer	5	4
(United States) L McNeil	6	6
(Italy) L Golarsa	3	3

Quarterfinals
(Netherlands) M Bollegraf	3	1^{r}
(United States) L McNeil	6	1
