= 1987 Pilkington Glass Championships =

1987 tennis tournament in Eastbourne, United Kingdom

Coordinates: 50°45′51″N 0°17′0″E

- Date: 15–20 June
- Edition: 13th
- Category: Category 4
- Draw: 64S / 32D
- Prize money: $200,000
- Surface: Grass / outdoor
- Location: Eastbourne, United Kingdom
- Venue: Devonshire Park Lawn Tennis Club

Champions

Singles
- (Czechoslovakia) Helena Suková

Doubles
- (Soviet Union) Svetlana Parkhomenko (Soviet Union) Larisa Savchenko
← 1986 ·	Eastbourne International	· 1988 →

The 1987 Pilkington Glass Championships was a women's tennis tournament played on grass courts at the Devonshire Park Lawn Tennis Club in Eastbourne, United Kingdom and was part of Category 4 (Note: Tournaments, other than Grand Slams, with prize money for women of at least $200,000.) tier of the 1987 WTA Tour. It was the 13th edition of the tournament and ran from 15 June until 20 June 1987. Third-seeded Helena Suková won the singles title.

== Finals ==
=== Singles ===
(Czechoslovakia) Helena Suková defeated (United States) Martina Navratilova 7–6^{(7–5)}, 6–3

- It was Suková's 2nd singles title of the year and the 6th of her career.

=== Doubles ===
(Soviet Union) Svetlana Parkhomenko / (Soviet Union) Larisa Savchenko defeated (South Africa) Rosalyn Fairbank / (Australia) Elizabeth Smylie 7–6^{(7–5)}, 4–6, 7–5
