= 1986 Pilkington Glass Championships =

Coordinates: 50°45′51″N 0°17′0″E

- Date: 16–21 June
- Edition: 12th
- Draw: 64S / 32D
- Prize money: $200,000
- Surface: Grass / outdoor
- Location: Eastbourne, United Kingdom
- Venue: Devonshire Park Lawn Tennis Club

Champions

Singles
- (United States) Martina Navratilova

Doubles
- (United States) Martina Navratilova (United States) Pam Shriver
← 1985 ·	Eastbourne International	· 1987 →

The 1986 Pilkington Glass Championships was a women's tennis tournament played on grass courts at the Devonshire Park Lawn Tennis Club in Eastbourne, United Kingdom and was part of the 1986 WTA Tour. It was the 12th edition of the tournament and ran from 16 June until 21 June 1986. First-seeded Martina Navratilova won the singles title, her fifth consecutive at the event and sixth in total.

== Finals ==
=== Singles ===
(United States) Martina Navratilova defeated (Czechoslovakia) Helena Suková 3–6, 6–3, 6–4

- It was Navratilova's 6th singles title of the year and the 117th of her career.

=== Doubles ===
(United States) Martina Navratilova / (United States) Pam Shriver defeated (West Germany) Claudia Kohde-Kilsch / (Czechoslovakia) Helena Suková 6–2, 6–4
