= 1989 Pilkington Glass Championships =

- Date: 19–25 June
- Edition: 15th
- Category: Category 5
- Draw: 64S / 32D
- Prize money: $300,000
- Surface: Grass
- Location: Eastbourne, United Kingdom
- Venue: Devonshire Park Lawn Tennis Club

Champions

Singles
- (United States) Martina Navratilova

Doubles
- (United States) Katrina Adams / (United States) Zina Garrison
- Eastbourne International

The 1989 Pilkington Glass Championships was a women's tennis tournament played on grass courts at the Devonshire Park Lawn Tennis Club in Eastbourne, United Kingdom, that was part of the Category 5 tier of the 1989 WTA Tour. It was the 15th edition of the tournament, and was held from 19 June until 25 June 1989. First-seeded Martina Navratilova won the singles title.

== Finals ==
=== Singles ===
(United States) Martina Navratilova defeated (Italy) Raffaella Reggi 7–6^{(7–2)}, 6–2

- It was Navratilova's 4th singles title of the year and the 142nd of her career.

=== Doubles ===
(United States) Katrina Adams / (United States) Zina Garrison defeated (Czechoslovakia) Jana Novotná / (Czechoslovakia) Helena Suková 6–3 (Novotná and Suková retired)

- It was Adams' fifth doubles title of the year and the ninth of her career. It was Garrison's third doubles title of the year and the twelfth of her career.
