= 1993 Volkswagen Cup – Doubles =

Doubles
- 1993 Volkswagen Cup
- 1992 Champions: (Czech Republic) Jana Novotná (Latvia) Larisa Savchenko

Final
- Champions: (United States) Gigi Fernández (Belarus) Natalia Zvereva
- Runners-up: (Czech Republic) Jana Novotná (Latvia) Larisa Savchenko
- Score: 2–6, 7–5, 6–1

Details
- Draw: 32
- Seeds: 8

Events
Singles	Doubles
- Eastbourne International

Jana Novotná and Larisa Savchenko were the defending champions but were beaten in the final by Gigi Fernández and Natalia Zvereva, 2–6, 7–5, 6–1.

== Seeds ==
Champion seeds are indicated in bold text while text in italics indicates the round in which those seeds were eliminated.

1. (United States) **Gigi Fernández** / (Belarus) **Natalia Zvereva (champions)**
2. (Latvia) Larisa Savchenko / (Czech Republic) Jana Novotná (final)
3. (Spain) Arantxa Sánchez Vicario / (Czech Republic) Helena Suková (Quarterfinal)
4. (United States) ~~Mary Joe Fernández~~ / (United States) ~~Zina Garrison Jackson~~ (withdrew)
5. (United States) ~~Pam Shriver~~ / (Australia) ~~Elizabeth Smylie~~ (withdrew)
6. (Canada) Jill Hetherington / (United States) Kathy Rinaldi (Quarterfinal)
7. (United States) Katrina Adams / (Netherlands) Manon Bollegraf (semifinal)
8. (South Africa) Amanda Coetzer / (Argentina) Inés Gorrochategui (semifinals)

== Draw ==
Key

- Q = Qualifier
- WC = Wild card
- LL = Lucky loser
- Alt = Alternate
- ITF = ITF entry
- PR = Protected ranking
- SR = Special ranking
- SE = Special exempt
- JE = Junior exempt
- JR = Junior Accelerator Programme entrant
- CO = College Accelerator Programme entrant
- NG = Next Gen Accelerator Program entrant
- w/o = Walkover
- r = Retired
- d = Defaulted

=== Final ===
Final
1	(United States) **Gigi Fernández** **(Belarus) Natalia Zvereva**	2	**7**	**6**
2	(Czech Republic) Jana Novotná (Latvia) Larisa Savchenko	**6**	5	1

=== Top half ===
First round
1	(United States) **G Fernández** **(Netherlands) N Zvereva**	**7**	**6**
(United States) B Nagelsen (South Africa) R Nideffer	5	1
Q	(Netherlands) **M Oremans** **(Netherlands) C Vis**	w/o
(United States) P Fendick (United States) M McGrath
(United States) **S Collins** **(United States) R White**	**6**	1	**8**
(Japan) K Date (Japan) E Iida	1	**6**	6
(United States) L Allen (United States) N Arendt	**7**	2	2
6	(Canada) **Jill Hetherington** **(United States) K Rinaldi**	6	**6**	**6**
3	(Spain) **A Sánchez Vicario** (Czech Republic) H Suková	w/o
(United Kingdom) J Durie (France) C Suire
(Belgium) S Appelmans (Italy) S Farina	5	4
(Peru) **L Gildemeister** **(Hungary) A Temesvári**	**7**	**6**
(Japan) R Hiraki (United States) K Po	4	2
(France) **P Paradis-Mangon** **(France) S Testud**	**6**	**6**
(France) I Demongeot (South Africa) E Reinach	0	**6**	2
8	(South Africa) **A Coetzer** **(Argentina) I Gorrochategui**	**6**	3	**6**

Second round
1	(United States) **G Fernández** **(Netherlands) N Zvereva**	w/o
Q	(Netherlands) M Oremans (Netherlands) C Vis
(United States) S Collins (United States) R White	**6**	3	0
6	(Canada) **Jill Hetherington** **(United States) K Rinaldi**	3	**6**	**6**
3	(Spain) **A Sánchez Vicario** (Czech Republic) H Suková	**6**	**6**
(Peru) L Gildemeister (Hungary) A Temesvári	2	2
(France) P Paradis-Mangon (France) S Testud	4	3
8	(South Africa) **A Coetzer** **(Argentina) I Gorrochategui**	**6**	**6**

Quarterfinals
1	(United States) **G Fernández** **(Netherlands) N Zvereva**	**6**	**6**
6	(Canada) Jill Hetherington (United States) K Rinaldi	3	1
3	(Spain) A Sánchez Vicario (Czech Republic) H Suková	6	6
8	(South Africa) **A Coetzer** **(Argentina) I Gorrochategui**	**7**	**7**

Semifinals
1	(United States) **G Fernández** **(Netherlands) N Zvereva**	**6**	**6**
8	(South Africa) A Coetzer (Argentina) I Gorrochategui	0	3

=== Bottom half ===
First round
7	(United States) **K Adams** **(Netherlands) M Bollegraf**	**6**	6	**6**
(France) M Pierce (Czech Republic) A Strnadová	4	**7**	1
(United States) G Helgeson (United States) M Werdel	2	6
WC	(United Kingdom) **V Lake** **(United Kingdom) C Wood**	**6**	**7**
(Indonesia) Y Basuki (Japan) N Miyagi	0	4
(Australia) **N Provis** **(France) N Tauziat**	**6**	**6**
(Italy) **L Golarsa** **(Argentina) P Tarabini**	**6**	**7**
(Australia) L Pleming (France) N van Lottum	1	6
(Ukraine) **E Brioukhovets** (Ukraine) **N Medvedeva**	**6**	**6**
(United States) L Harvey-Wild (Canada) P Hy	1	0
(United States) **D Graham** **(Netherlands) B Schultz**	**6**	**6**
WC	(United Kingdom) A Grunfeld (United Kingdom) J Salmon	2	1
(United States) C MacGregor (United States) S Stafford	5	4
(United States) **L Davenport** **(United States) C Rubin**	**7**	**6**
(Australia) R McQuillan (Germany) C Porwik	1	6
2	(Latvia) **L Savchenko** **(Czech Republic) J Novotná**	**6**	**7**

Second round
7	(United States) **K Adams** **(Netherlands) M Bollegraf**	**6**	**6**
WC	(United Kingdom) V Lake (United Kingdom) C Wood	2	3
(Australia) **N Provis** **(France) N Tauziat**	w/o
(Italy) L Golarsa (Argentina) P Tarabini
(Ukraine) **E Brioukhovets** (Ukraine) **N Medvedeva**	**6**	**6**
(United States) D Graham (Netherlands) B Schultz	4	3
(United States) L Davenport (United States) C Rubin	1	5
2	(Latvia) **L Savchenko** **(Czech Republic) J Novotná**	**6**	**7**

Quarterfinals
7	(United States) **K Adams** **(Netherlands) M Bollegraf**	**6**	**6**
(Australia) N Provis (France) N Tauziat	3	2
(Ukraine) E Brioukhovets (Ukraine) N Medvedeva	2	5
2	(Latvia) **L Savchenko** **(Czech Republic) J Novotná**	**6**	**7**

Semifinals
7	(United States) K Adams (Netherlands) M Bollegraf	3	2
2	(Latvia) **L Savchenko** **(Czech Republic) J Novotná**	**6**	**6**
