= 1993 Volkswagen Cup – Singles =

Singles
- 1993 Volkswagen Cup
- 1992 Champion: (United States) Lori McNeil

Final
- Champion: (United States) Martina Navratilova
- Runner-up: (Netherlands) Miriam Oremans
- Score: 2–6, 6–2, 6–3

Details
- Draw: 64
- Seeds: 16

Events
Singles	Doubles
- Eastbourne International

Lori McNeil was a defending champion at the time but was beaten in the 1993 semifinals by Miriam Oremans, 7–6, 7–6.

Martina Navratilova won in the final 2–6, 6–2, 6–3 against Oremans.

== Seeds ==
A champion seed is indicated in bold text while text in italics indicates the round in which that seed was eliminated.

1. (United States) **Martina Navratilova (champion)**
2. (Argentina) Gabriela Sabatini (third round)
3. (United States) Mary Jo Fernandez (second round)
4. (Czech Republic) Helena Suková (quarterfinals)
5. (France) Nathalie Tauziat (quarterfinals)
6. (Germany) ~~Sabine Hack~~ (withdrew)
7. (Japan) Naoko Sawamatsu (third round)
8. (Japan) Kimiko Date (third round)
9. (Belarus) Natalia Zvereva (second round)
10. (United States) Lori McNeil (semifinals)
11. (Australia) Nicole Provis (third round)
12. (United States) Zina Garrison-Jackson (third round)
13. (United States) Lindsay Davenport (first round)
14. (Netherlands) Brenda Schultz (third round)
15. (United States) Patty Fendick (semifinals)
16. (United States) Pam Shriver (second round)

== Draw ==
Key

- Q = Qualifier
- WC = Wild card
- LL = Lucky loser
- Alt = Alternate
- ITF = ITF entry
- PR = Protected ranking
- SR = Special ranking
- SE = Special exempt
- JE = Junior exempt
- JR = Junior Accelerator Programme entrant
- CO = College Accelerator Programme entrant
- NG = Next Gen Accelerator Program entrant
- w/o = Walkover
- r = Retired
- d = Defaulted

=== Finals ===
Semifinals
1	(United States) **Martina Navratilova**	**6**	**6**
15	(United States) Patty Fendick	1	3
(Netherlands) **Miriam Oremans**	**7**	**7**
10	(United States) Lori McNeil	6	6

Final
1	(United States) **Martina Navratilova**	2	**6**	**6**
(Netherlands) Miriam Oremans	**6**	2	3

=== Top half ===
==== Section 1 ====
First round
1	(United States) **M Navratilova**	**6**	**6**
Q	(Romania) R Dragomir	1	2
(United States) N Arendt	2	3
(United States) **R White**	**6**	**6**
(South Africa) E Reinach	0	**7**	1
(Canada) **P Hy**	**6**	5	**6**
(Czech Republic) A Strnadová	6	4
11	(Australia) **N Provis**	**7**	**6**
(United States) **G Fernández**	**7**	**6**
Q	(Japan) E Iida	5	1
Q	(Netherlands) **C Vis**	**6**	5	**6**
(Australia) M Jaggard-Lai	4	**7**	2
(United States) S Stafford	**7**	2	3
(Italy) **S Farina**	6	**6**	**6**
Q	(Italy) L Allen	2	3
7	(Japan) **N Sawamatsu**	**6**	**6**

Second round
1	(United States) **M Navratilova**	**6**	**6**
(United States) R White	2	2
(Canada) **P Hy**	**6**	**6**
11	(Australia) N Provis	3	1
(United States) **G Fernández**	3	**6**	**6**
Q	(Netherlands) C Vis	**6**	3	3
(Italy) S Farina	**7**	3	2
7	(Japan) **N Sawamatsu**	5	**6**	**6**

Third round
1	(United States) **M Navratilova**	**6**	3	**6**
(Canada) P Hy	4	**6**	3
(United States) **G Fernández**	**6**	**7**
7	(Japan) N Sawamatsu	2	5

Quarterfinal
1	(United States) **M Navratilova**	**6**	**6**
(United States) G Fernández	1	3

==== Section 2 ====
First round
3	(United States) **MJ Fernandez**	**6**	**7**
WC	(United Kingdom) S-A Siddall	4	5
(United States) **G Helgeson**	**6**	**6**
(France) S Testud	2	2
(Argentina) **I Gorrochategui**	3	**6**	**7**
(Australia) R McQuillan	**6**	1	5
(Japan) **M Endo**	4	**6**	**6**
13	(United States) L Davenport	**6**	1	3
15	(United States) **P Fendick**	5	**6**	**6**
(Peru) L Gildemeister	**7**	2	3
(Mexico) A Gavaldón	3	2
(United States) **K Po**	**6**	**6**
(United States) **L Raymond**	4	**6**	**10**
(Australia) E Smylie	**6**	2	8
Q	(Belarus) T Ignatieva	4	2
9	(Belarus) **N Zvereva**	**6**	**6**

Second round
3	(United States) MJ Fernandez	2	2
(United States) **G Helgeson**	**6**	**6**
(Argentina) **I Gorrochategui**	**7**	3	**6**
(Japan) M Endo	5	**6**	3
15	(United States) **P Fendick**	**6**	**6**
(United States) K Po	3	3
(United States) **L Raymond**	**6**	**7**
9	(Belarus) N Zvereva	4	6

Third round
(United States) **G Helgeson**	**6**	**6**
(Argentina) I Gorrochategui	4	2
15	(United States) **P Fendick**	**7**	**6**
(United States) L Raymond	5	4

Quarterfinal
(United States) G Helgeson	5	4
15	(United States) **P Fendick**	**7**	**6**

=== Bottom half ===
==== Section 3 ====
First round
8	(Japan) **K Date**	**6**	**6**
(Japan) R Hiraki	3	4
Q	(Kazakhstan) E Likhovtseva	4	**6**	1
(United Kingdom) **J Durie**	**6**	4	**6**
(United States) C Rubin	2	3
(Netherlands) **M Oremans**	**6**	**6**
(Netherlands) K Boogert	4	2
13	(United States) **P Shriver**	**6**	**6**
14	(Netherlands) **B Schultz**	**6**	**7**
(United States) D Graham	2	5
(South Africa) **R Nideffer**	**6**	**6**
(Hungary) A Temesvári	4	3
(United States) M Werdel	4	5
WC	(United Kingdom) **M Javer**	**6**	**7**
(United States) L Harvey-Wild	1	2
4	(Czech Republic) **H Suková**	**6**	**6**

Second round
8	(Japan) **K Date**	w/o
(United Kingdom) J Durie
(Netherlands) **M Oremans**	**7**	0
13	(United States) P Shriver	5	1	r
14	(Netherlands) **B Schultz**	**6**	**7**
(South Africa) R Nideffer	4	6
WC	(United Kingdom) M Javer	2	1
4	(Czech Republic) **H Suková**	**6**	**6**

Third round
8	(Japan) K Date	5	2
(Netherlands) **M Oremans**	**7**	**6**
14	(Netherlands) B Schultz	5	2
4	(Czech Republic) **H Suková**	**7**	**6**

Quarterfinal
(Netherlands) **M Oremans**	**6**	1	**7**
4	(Czech Republic) H Suková	3	**6**	5

==== Section 4 ====
First round
5	(France) **N Tauziat**	**6**	**6**
Q	(Australia) J-A Faull	3	1
(Soviet Union) **L Savchenko**	**6**	**6**
WC	(United Kingdom) A Grunfeld	3	2
(Netherlands) **M Bollegraf**	6	**7**	**6**
Q	(France) C Suire	**7**	6	0
(Indonesia) Y Basuki	5	2
12	(United States) **Z Garrison-Jackson**	**7**	**6**
10	(United States) **L McNeil**	**6**	**6**
WC	(United Kingdom) C Wood	4	1
(United States) **T Whitlinger**	0	**7**	**6**
(Ukraine) E Brioukhovets	**6**	6	4
LL	(Germany) **C Porwik**	**7**	**6**
(Finland) N Dahlman	6	2
(France) P Paradis-Mangon	3	2
2	(Argentina) **G Sabatini**	**6**	**6**

Second round
5	(France) **N Tauziat**	**7**	5	**6**
(Soviet Union) L Savchenko	6	**7**	4
(Netherlands) M Bollegraf	3	3
12	(United States) **Z Garrison-Jackson**	**6**	**6**
10	(United States) **L McNeil**	**6**	**7**
(United States) T Whitlinger	2	5
LL	(Germany) C Porwik	5	1
2	(Argentina) **G Sabatini**	**7**	**6**

Third round
5	(France) **N Tauziat**	5	**6**	1
12	(United States) Z Garrison-Jackson	**7**	2	0^{r}
10	(United States) **L McNeil**	**7**	**6**
2	(Argentina) G Sabatini	6	1

Quarterfinal
5	(France) N Tauziat	1	5
10	(United States) **L McNeil**	**6**	**7**
