= 1991 Pilkington Glass Championships =

- Date: 17–22 June
- Edition: 17th
- Category: Tier II
- Draw: 64S / 32D
- Prize money: $350,000
- Surface: Grass
- Location: Eastbourne, United Kingdom
- Venue: Devonshire Park Lawn Tennis Club

Champions

Singles
- (United States) Martina Navratilova

Doubles
- (Soviet Union) Larisa Savchenko (Soviet Union) Natasha Zvereva
- Eastbourne International

The 1991 Pilkington Glass Championships was a women's tennis tournament played on grass courts at the Devonshire Park Lawn Tennis Club in Eastbourne in the United Kingdom that was part of Tier II of the 1991 WTA Tour. The tournament was held from 17 June until 22 June 1991.

== Finals ==
=== Singles ===
(United States) Martina Navratilova defeated (Spain) Arantxa Sánchez Vicario 6–4, 6–4

- It was Navratilova's fourth singles title of the year and the 144th of her career.

=== Doubles ===
(Soviet Union) Larisa Savchenko / (Soviet Union) Natasha Zvereva defeated (United States) Gigi Fernández / (Czechoslovakia) Jana Novotná 2–6, 6–4, 6–4

- It was Savchenko's fifth doubles title of the year and the 23rd of her career. It was Zvereva's fourth doubles title of the year and the 14th of her career.
