= Devonshire Park Lawn Tennis Club =

Tennis complex in Eastbourne, United Kingdom

- the club where sport and sociability walk hand in hand
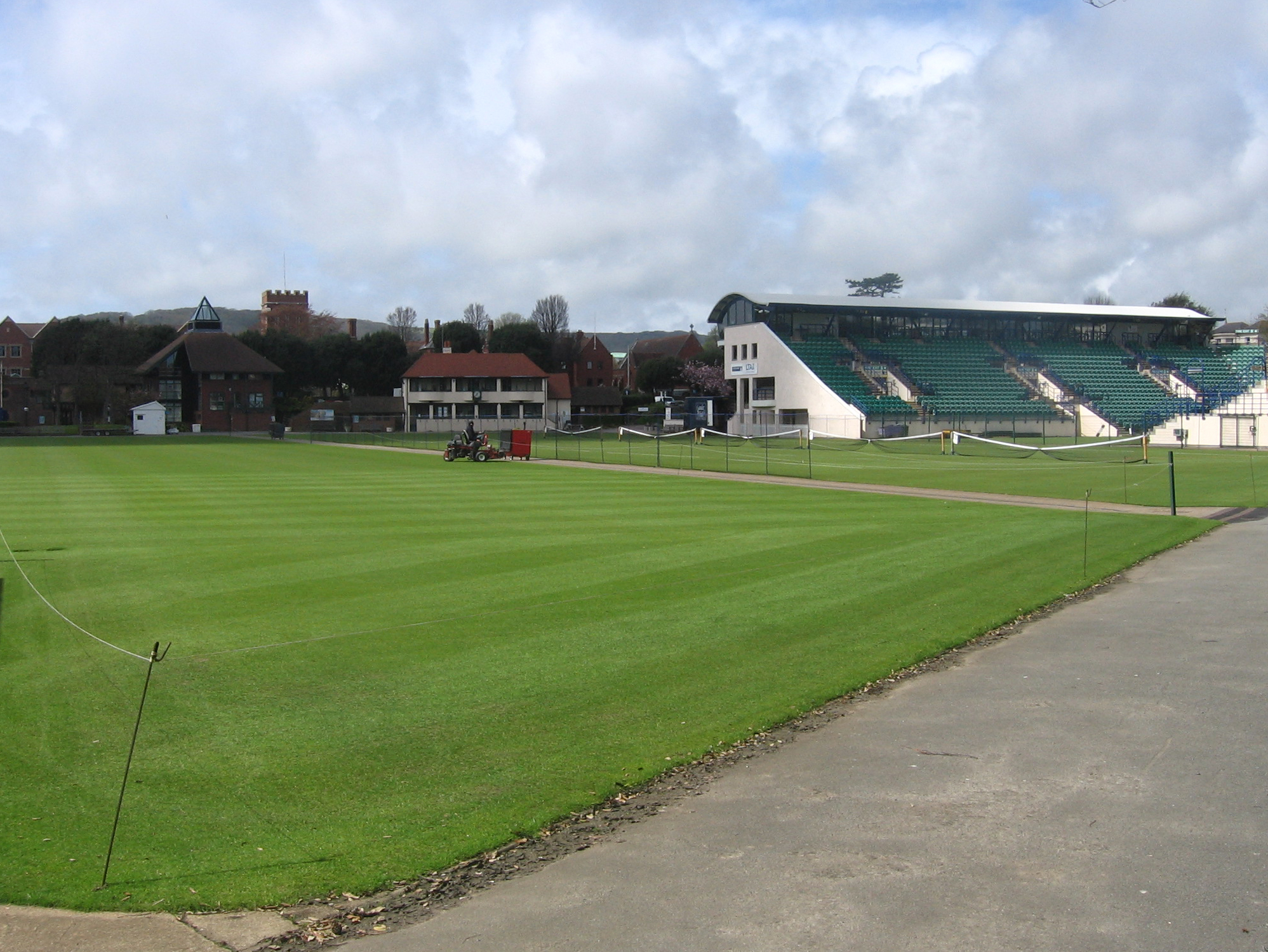
- Interactive map of Devonshire Park Lawn Tennis Club
- Location: Eastbourne, United Kingdom
- Coordinates: 50.763686°N 0.283204°E
- Surface: grass

Construction
- Opened: 1881

Tenants
- Devonshire Park F.C. Fed Cup Eastbourne International (WTA/ATP): 1881–1886; 1977 (present)

The Devonshire Park Lawn Tennis Club is a tennis complex in Eastbourne, United Kingdom. The complex is the host of the annual ATP and WTA Tour tournament called the Eastbourne International. The stadium court has a capacity of 8,000 people. The Devonshire Park, originally intended as a cricket ground, opened its gates to the public on 1 July 1874 and in 1879, the first tennis courts was marked out on its lawns. In 1877 the All England Croquet and Lawn Tennis Club set about regularising the laws of lawn tennis and produced its first tournament at Wimbledon running from July 9–16 of that year. In 1881 the club staged the inaugural South of England Championships, the event was played annually for 136 years until 1972.

In June 2016 the Lawn Tennis Association (LTA) and the Eastbourne council announced a £44m project to upgrade the park including a show court and new practice courts.

== Other uses ==
=== Football ===
In 1881, Devonshire Park Football Club, now known as Eastbourne Town first played here on 26 October 1881, having failed to secure a site near to Guildredge Park, the Devonshire Park company agreed the club to use the facilities alongside the cricket club and the tennis. This agreement lasted until 1886 when the tennis became more prominent and the club relocated to The Saffrons nearby.

== Gallery ==
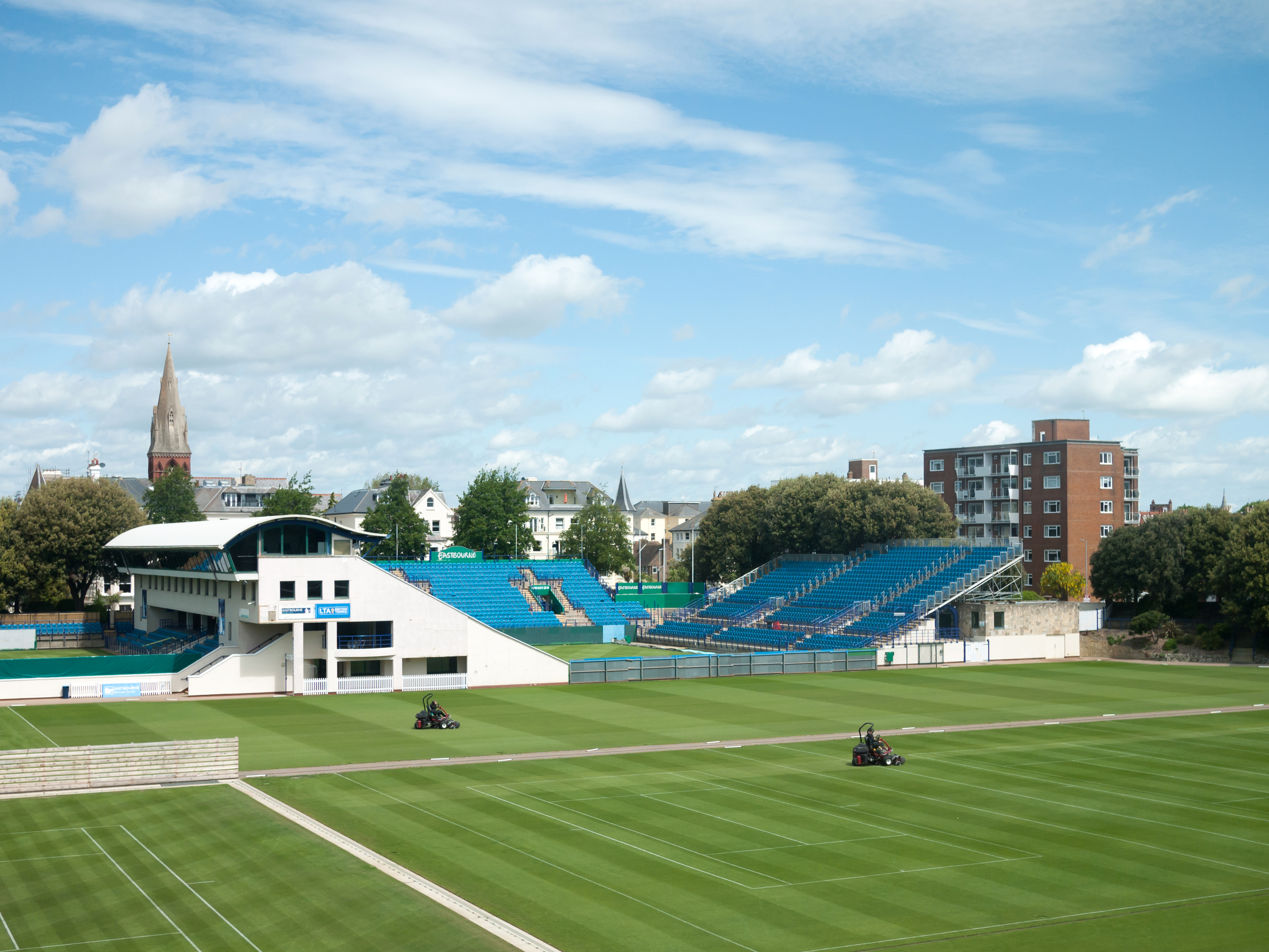
Devonshire Park in May 2019

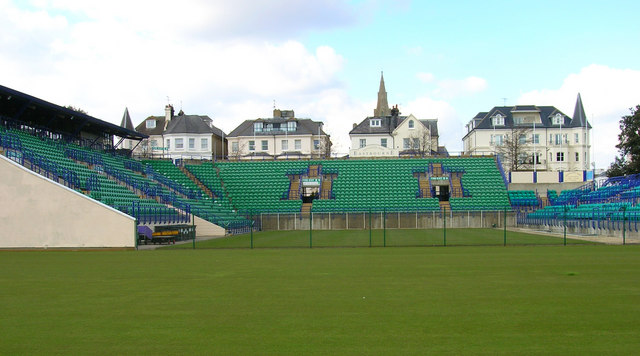
Centre court in April 2006

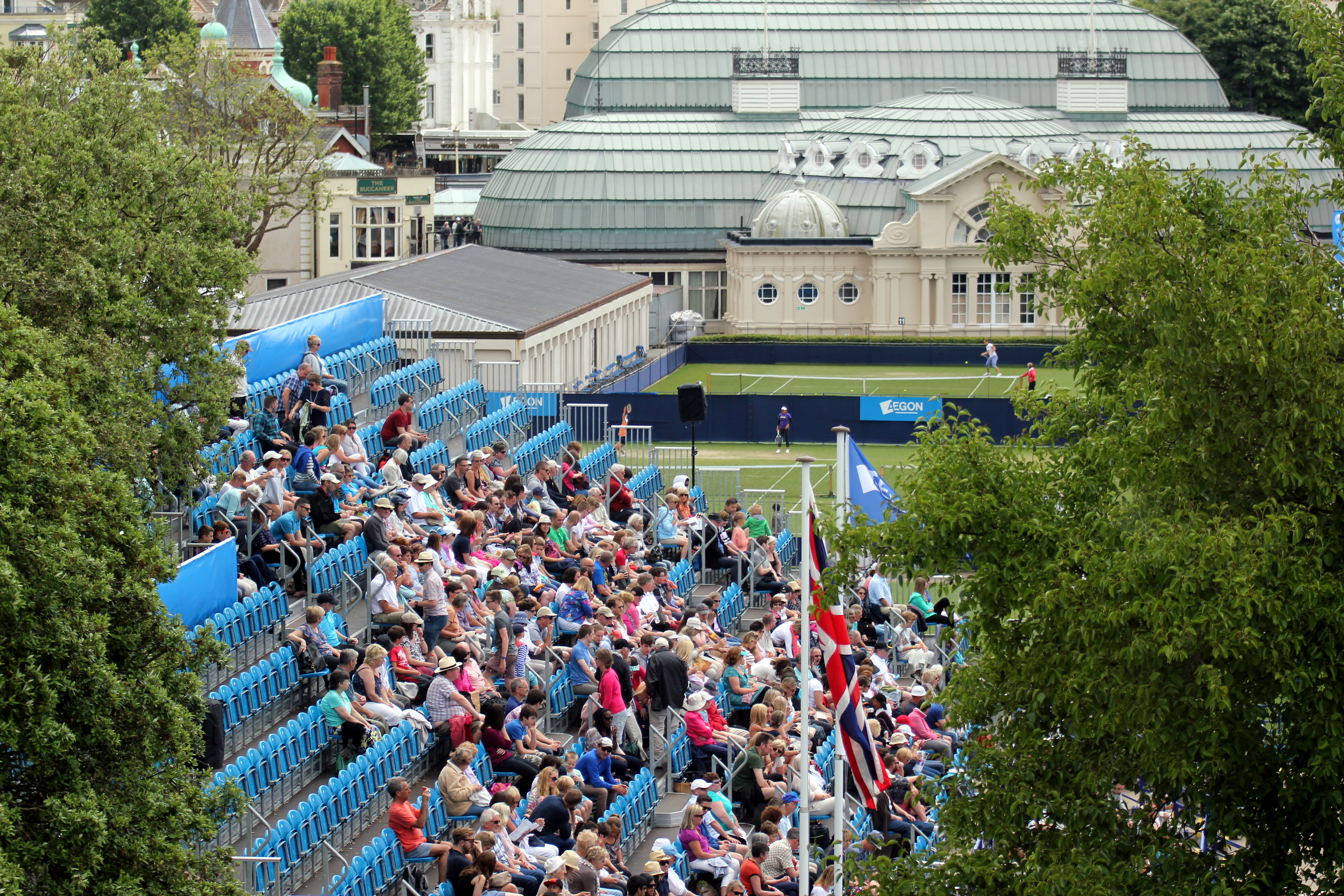
Crowd at Devonshire Park during the 2014 Aegon International

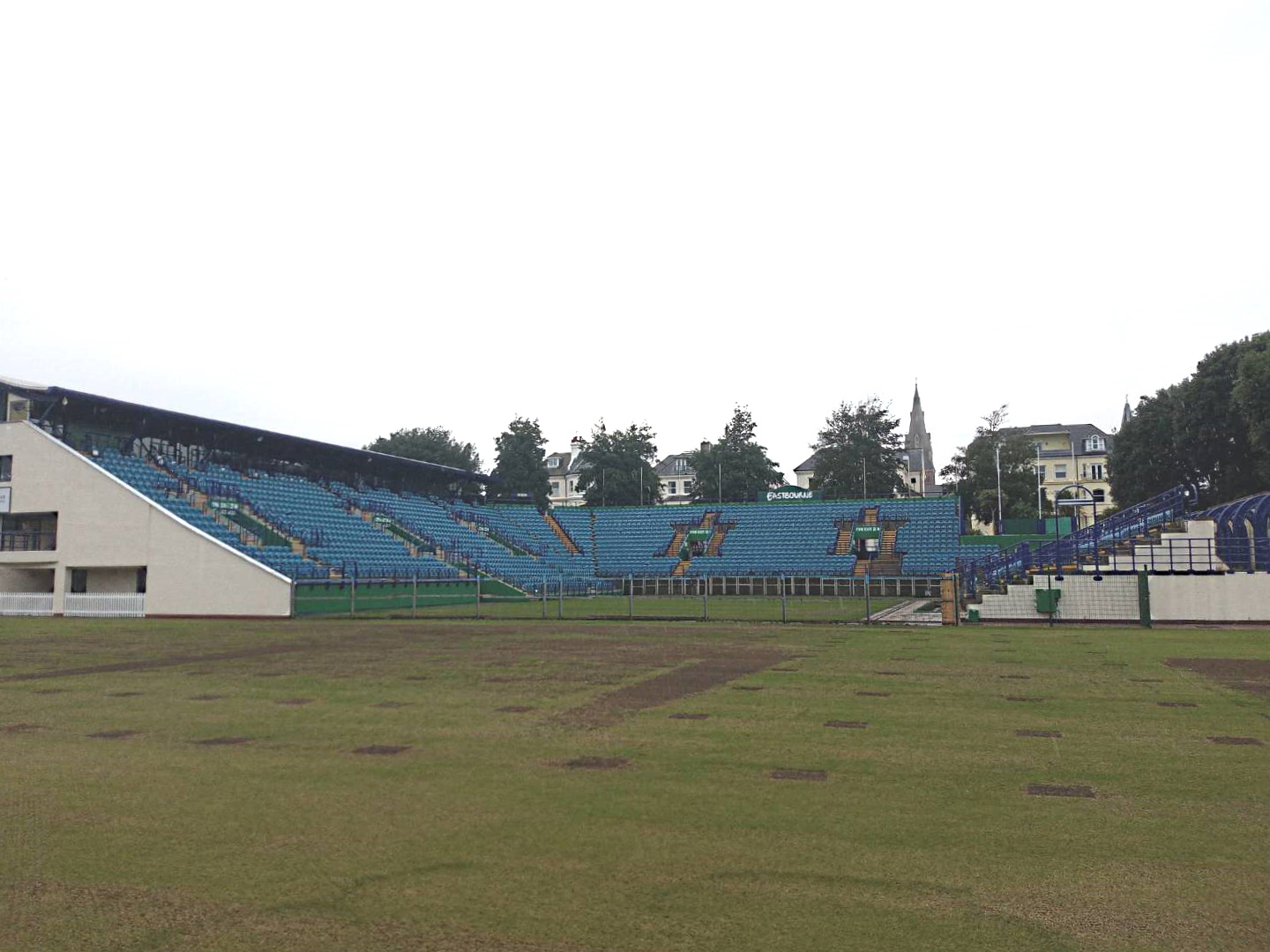
Devonshire Park in September 2021

== See also ==
- List of tennis stadiums by capacity

Preceded by Spectrum; Philadelphia	Fed Cup; Final Venue; 1977	Succeeded by Kooyong Stadium; Melbourne
