= Amazing Hotels: Life Beyond the Lobby =

- Genre: Travel
- Presented by: Giles Coren (2017–2022); Monica Galetti (2017–present); Rob Rinder (2023–present)
- Country of origin: United Kingdom
- Original language: English
- No. of seasons: 6

Production
- Running time: 59 minutes

Original release
- Network: BBC One; BBC One HD
- Release: 27 March 2017 – present

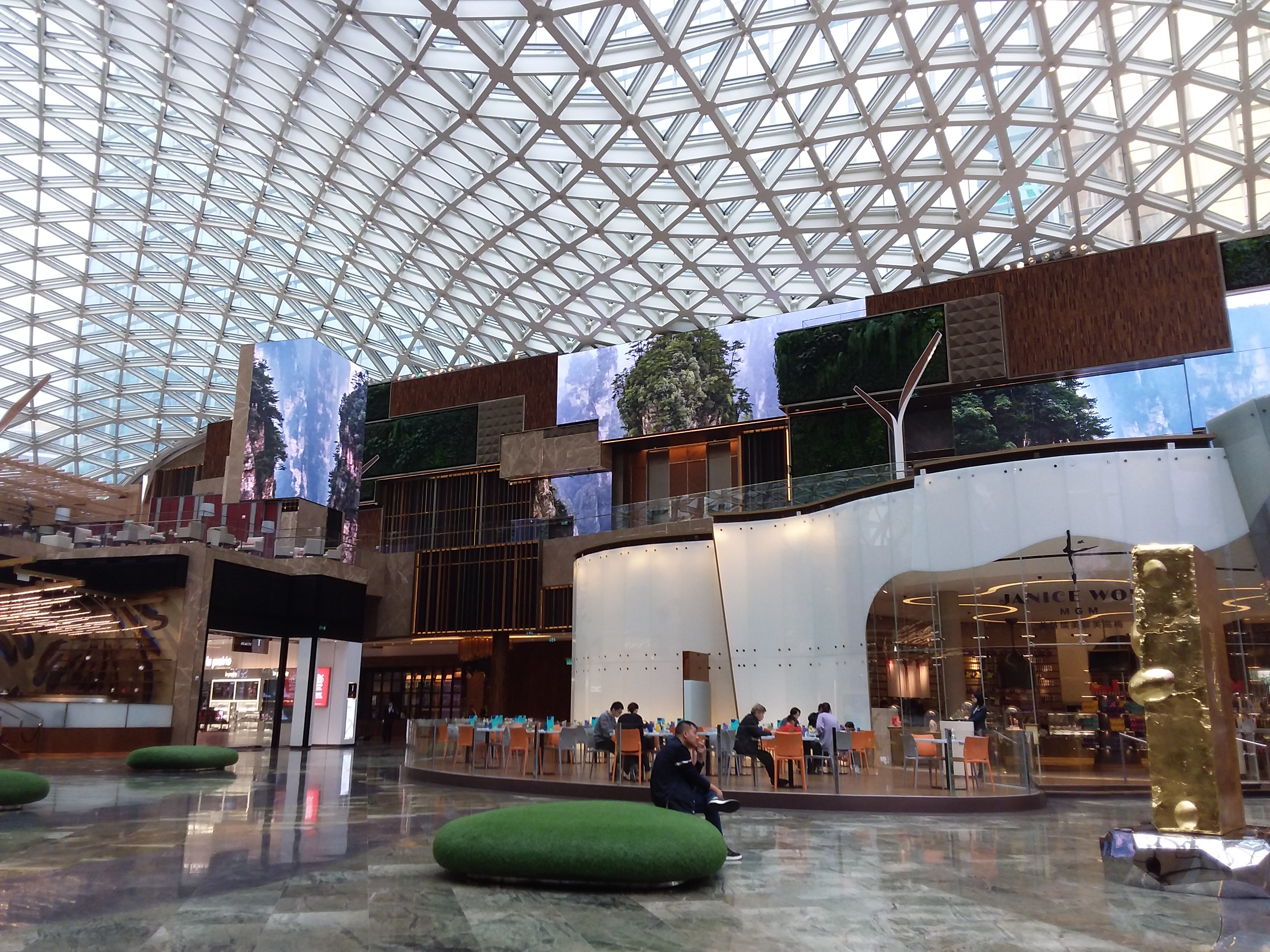
The MGM Cotai hotel shopping mall lobby, featured in Series 3 of Amazing Hotels

Amazing Hotels: Life Beyond the Lobby is a British BBC documentary television series, presented by the journalist Giles Coren and the chef Monica Galetti, and started in 2017.

Each programme in the series is based on a luxury hotel. The presenters take a hands-on approach, investigating the running of the hotel, hence the subtitle of the series. The programmes are shown on BBC Two.

The fourth series ran in 2021.

On 31 October 2022, the BBC announced that Rob Rinder will be the series' new co-presenter replacing Giles Coren who left after series four.

== Featured hotels ==
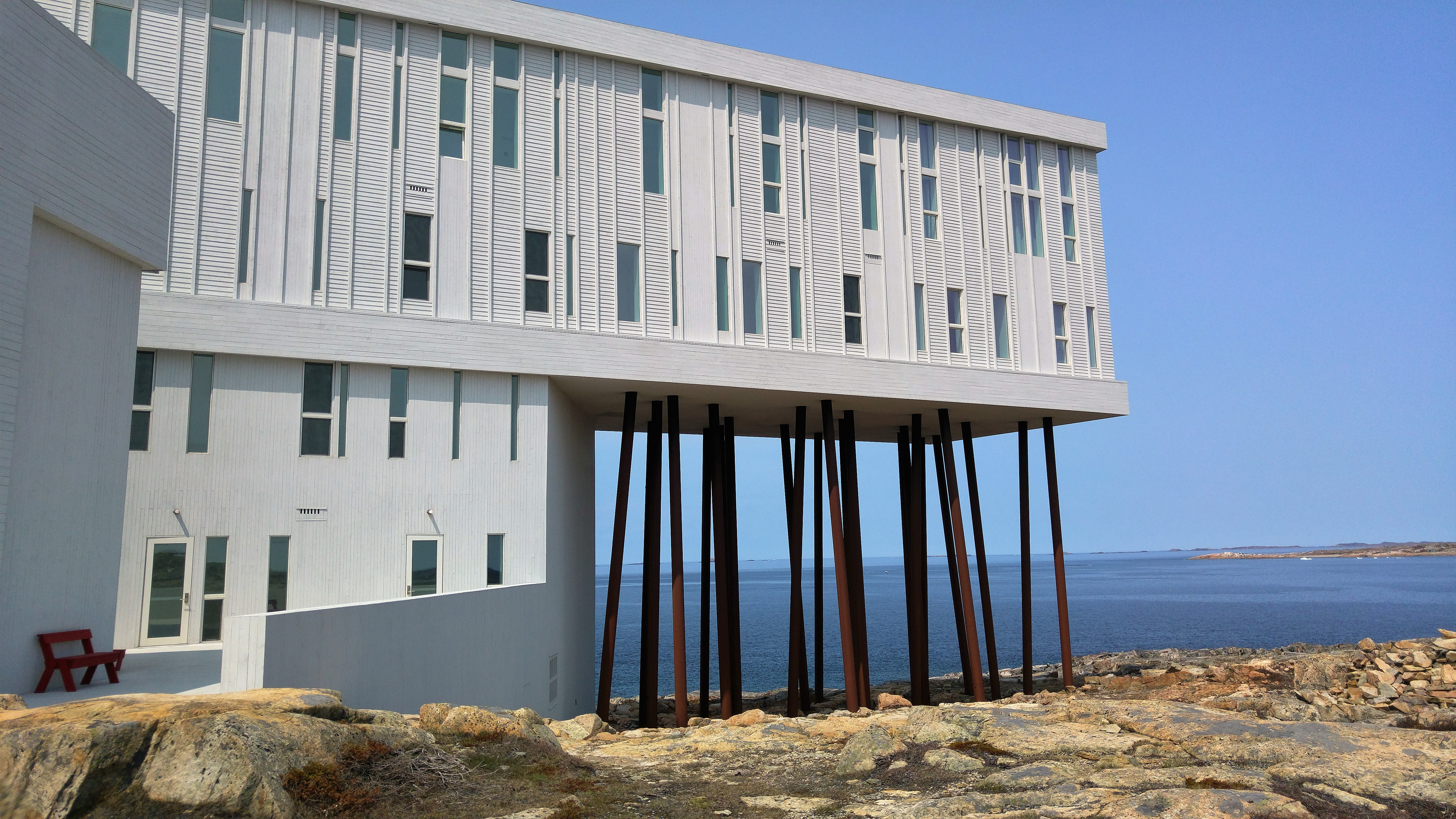
Fogo Island Inn

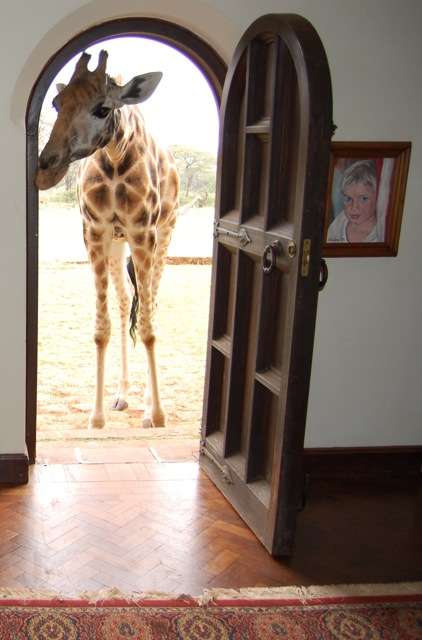
A giraffe poking its head through the front door of Giraffe Manor

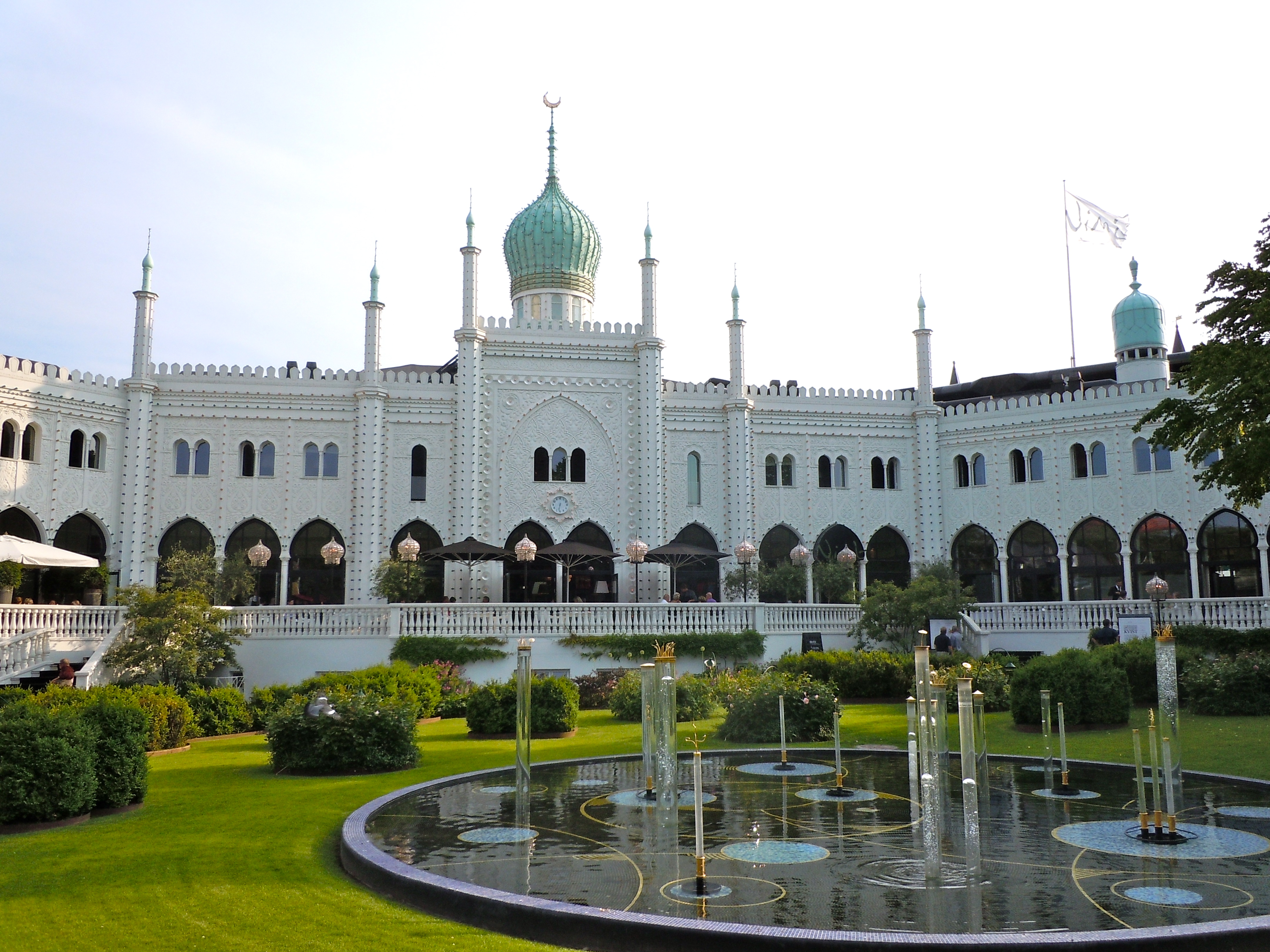
Nimb Hotel, overlooking Tivoli Gardens in Copenhagen, Denmark

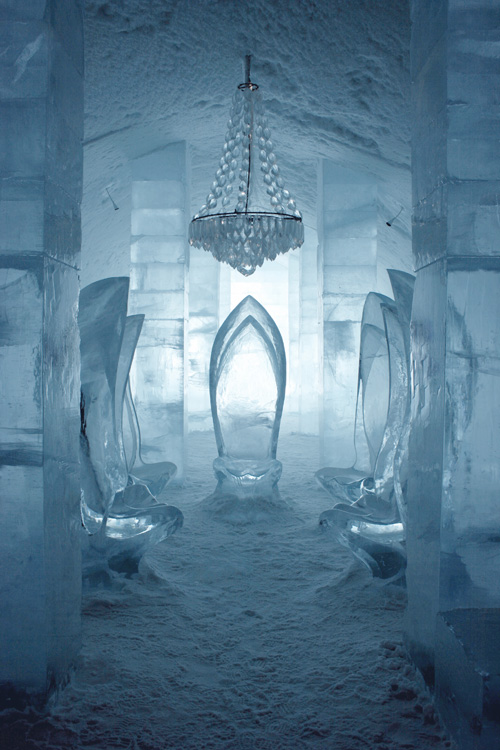
Jukkasjärvi Icehotel interior. Sculptures by Jörgen Westin

Featured hotels include the following:

Series 1 (2017)

1. Marina Bay Sands, Singapore
2. Mashpi Lodge, Ecuador
3. Giraffe Manor, Kenya
4. Royal Mansour, Morocco
5. Fogo Island Inn, Canada
6. ICEHOTEL, Sweden

Series 2 (2018)

1. The Brando Resort, French Polynesia
2. Anantara Al Jabal Al Akhdar, Oman
3. Grand Resort Bad Ragaz, Switzerland
4. Ashford Castle, Ireland
5. The Silo, South Africa
6. Hacienda Vira Vira, Chile
7. Kulm Hotel St. Moritz, Switzerland

Series 3 (2021)

1. MGM Cotai, Macau
2. The Torridon, Scotland, UK
3. Schloss Elmau, Germany
4. Jade Mountain, St Lucia
5. Swinton Estate, England, UK
6. Shangri-La, England, UK

Series 4 (2021–22)

1. ION Adventure Hotel, Iceland
2. Reid's Palace, Portugal
3. Grand Park Rovinj, Croatia
4. Nimb Hotel, Denmark
5. Qasr Al Sarab Desert Resort, Abu Dhabi, UAE
6. The Lanesborough, England, UK

Series 5 (2023)

1. Kasbah Tamadot, Morocco
2. Joali Maldives, Maldives
3. Nusfjord Arctic Resort, Norway
4. Ceylon Tea Trails, Sri Lanka
5. Phinda Game Reserve, South Africa
6. Borgo Egnazia, Italy
7. Glenapp Castle, Scotland, UK
8. Hotel Hubertus, Italy

Series 6 (2024)

1. InterContinental Shanghai Wonderland, China
2. Hotel Argos, Turkey
3. Six Senses, Spain
4. The Hassler, Italy
5. The Datai Langkawi, Malaysia
6. Gangtey Lodge, Bhutan
7. Stanglwirt Hotel, Austria
8. Wilderness Hotel Inari, Finland
