= 2005 Volvo Women's Open – Doubles =

Doubles
- 2005 Volvo Women's Open

Final
- Champion: (France) Marion Bartoli (Germany) Anna-Lena Grönefeld
- Runner-up: (Poland) Marta Domachowska (Croatia) Silvija Talaja
- Score: 6–3, 6–2

Details
- Draw: 16
- Seeds: 4

Events
Singles	Doubles
← 2003 ·	PTT Pattaya Open	· 2006 →

Marion Bartoli and Anna-Lena Grönefeld won the doubles title in this edition of the Thailand Open. The 2004 edition was cancelled.

== Seeds ==
1. (Spain) Magüi Serna / (Thailand) Tamarine Tanasugarn (quarterfinals)
2. (France) Marion Bartoli / (Germany) Anna-Lena Grönefeld (winners)
3. (United States) Jennifer Hopkins / (United States) Mashona Washington (semifinals)
4. (Belarus) Tatiana Poutchek / (Russia) Anastasia Rodionova (quarterfinals)

== Draw ==
First round
1	(Spain) M Serna (Thailand) T Tanasugarn	6	6
(Hungary) M Czink (Israel) T Obziler	2	1
(Poland) M Domachowska (Croatia) S Talaja	6	6
WC	(Thailand) P Buaklee (Thailand) O Lamangthong	0	4
4	(Belarus) T Poutchek (Russia) A Rodionova	6	6
Q	(Australia) M Adamczak (Australia) N Kriz	0	3
(Russia) N Bratchikova (Netherlands) K Kilsdonk	3	2
(Ukraine) Y Fedak (Ukraine) T Perebiynis	6	6
(Republic of Ireland) K Liggan (Russia) G Voskoboeva	5	2
(Germany) A Barna (Germany) M Weingärtner	7	6
(Luxembourg) A Kremer (Italy) An Serra Zanetti	3	6	1
3	(United States) J Hopkins (United States) M Washington	6	3	6
(Chinese Taipei) C-j Chuang (Chinese Taipei) S-w Hsieh	6^{3}	1
(Ukraine) A Bondarenko (Ukraine) K Bondarenko	7	6
(Italy) M Santangelo (Romania) A Vanc	2	2
2	(France) M Bartoli (Germany) A-L Grönefeld	6	6

Quarterfinals
1	(Spain) M Serna (Thailand) T Tanasugarn	1	6	3
(Poland) M Domachowska (Croatia) S Talaja	6	3	6
4	(Belarus) T Poutchek (Russia) A Rodionova	3	6^{4}
(Ukraine) Y Fedak (Ukraine) T Perebiynis	6	7
(Germany) A Barna (Germany) M Weingärtner	0	1
3	(United States) J Hopkins (United States) M Washington	6	6
(Ukraine) A Bondarenko (Ukraine) K Bondarenko	3	1
2	(France) M Bartoli (Germany) A-L Grönefeld	6	6

Semifinals
(Poland) M Domachowska (Croatia) S Talaja	7	6
(Ukraine) Y Fedak (Ukraine) T Perebiynis	5	2
3	(United States) J Hopkins (United States) M Washington	3	6	3
2	(France) M Bartoli (Germany) A-L Grönefeld	6	3	6

Final
(Poland) M Domachowska (Croatia) S Talaja	3	2
2	(France) M Bartoli (Germany) A-L Grönefeld	6	6
