= Martina Hingis =

Swiss tennis player (born 1980)

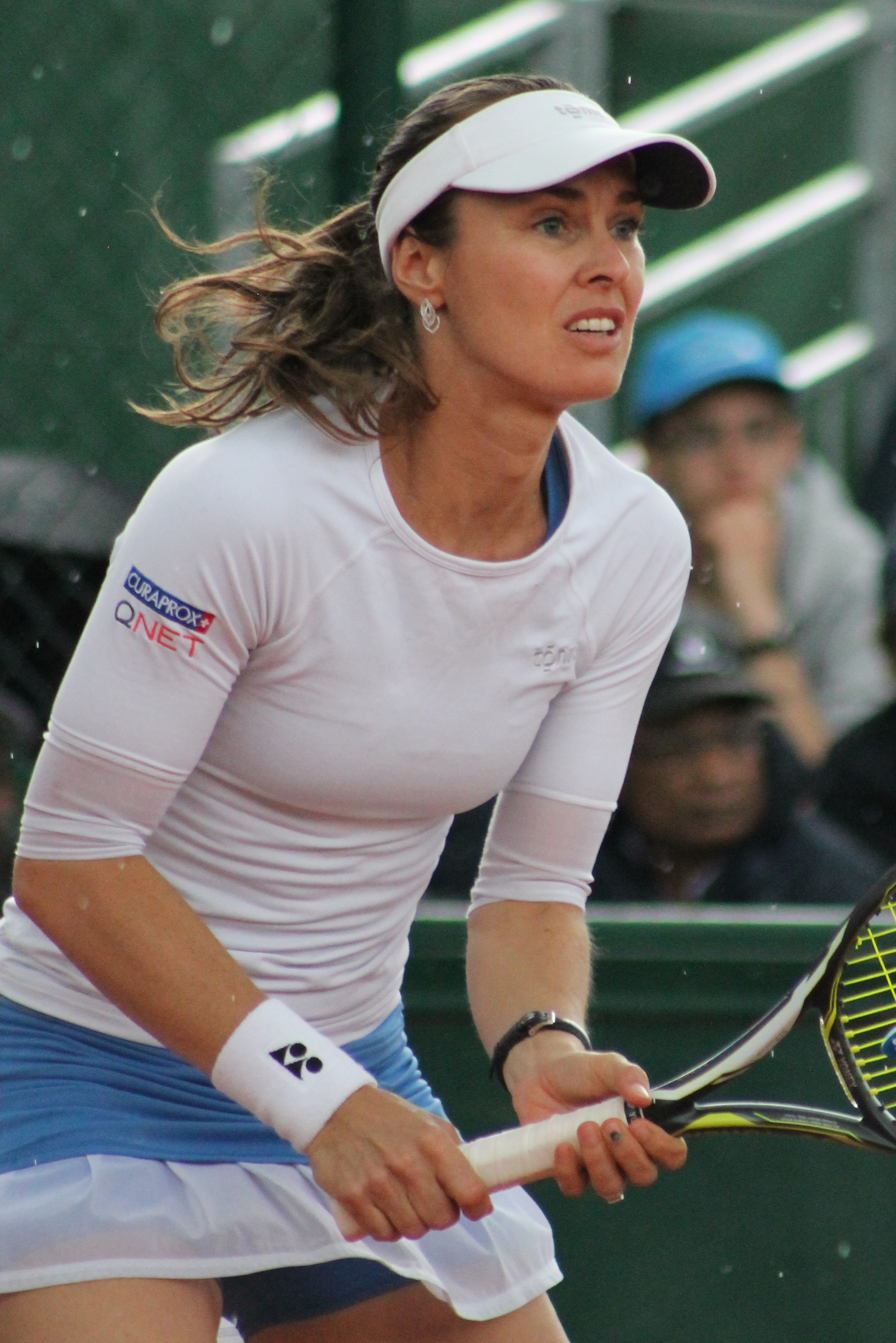
- Hingis at the 2016 French Open
- Native name: Martina Hingisová
- Country (sports): Switzerland
- Residence: Feusisberg, Switzerland
- Born: 30 September 1980 (age 46) Košice, Czechoslovakia
- Height: 1.70 m (5 ft 7 in)
- Turned pro: 1994
- Retired: 2017
- Plays: Right-handed (two-handed backhand)
- Prize money: US$24,749,074: 19th all-time in earnings
- Int. Tennis HoF: 2013 (member page)

Singles
- Career record: 548–135
- Career titles: 43
- Highest ranking: No. 1 (31 March 1997)

Grand Slam singles results
- Australian Open: W (1997, 1998, 1999)
- French Open: F (1997, 1999)
- Wimbledon: W (1997)
- US Open: W (1997)

Other tournaments
- Tour Finals: W (1998, 2000)
- Olympic Games: 2R (1996)

Doubles
- Career record: 490–110
- Career titles: 64
- Highest ranking: No. 1 (8 June 1998)

Grand Slam doubles results
- Australian Open: W (1997, 1998, 1999, 2002, 2016)
- French Open: W (1998, 2000)
- Wimbledon: W (1996, 1998, 2015)
- US Open: W (1998, 2015, 2017)

Other doubles tournaments
- Tour Finals: W (1999, 2000, 2015)
- Olympic Games: F (2016)

Mixed doubles
- Career record: 54–12
- Career titles: 7

Grand Slam mixed doubles results
- Australian Open: W (2006, 2015)
- French Open: W (2016)
- Wimbledon: W (2015, 2017)
- US Open: W (2015, 2017)

Team competitions
- Fed Cup: F (1998)
- Hopman Cup: W (2001)

Coaching career (2013–2015)
- (Russia) Anastasia Pavlyuchenkova (2013) (Germany) Sabine Lisicki (2014) (Switzerland) Belinda Bencic (2015)

Coaching achievements
- Coachee singles titles total: 2
- Coachee doubles titles total: 2
Medal record
Representing Switzerland
Olympic Games
Silver medal – second place	2016 Rio de Janeiro	Doubles

Martina Hingis (Note: German pronunciation: [maʁˈtiːna ˈhɪŋɡɪs], Slovak: Martina Hingisová) (born 30 September 1980) is a Swiss former professional tennis player. She was ranked as the world No. 1 in women's singles by the Women's Tennis Association (WTA) for 209 weeks (fifth-most of all time) and as the world No. 1 in women's doubles for 90 weeks, holding both No. 1 rankings simultaneously for 29 weeks. Hingis won 43 WTA Tour-level singles titles and 64 doubles titles, including a total of 25 major titles: five in singles, 13 in women's doubles (including the Grand Slam in 1998), and seven in mixed doubles. In addition, she won the season-ending Tour Finals two times in singles and three in doubles, an Olympic silver medal in doubles, and a record 17 Tier I singles titles.

Hingis set a series of "youngest-ever" records during the 1990s, including youngest-ever Grand Slam champion and youngest-ever world No. 1. Before ligament injuries in both ankles forced her to withdraw temporarily from professional tennis in early 2003, at the age of 22, she had won 40 singles titles and 36 doubles titles and, according to Forbes, was the highest-paid female athlete in the world for five consecutive years, 1997 to 2001. After several surgeries and long recoveries, Hingis returned to the WTA Tour in 2006, climbing to world No. 6 in singles, winning two Tier I tournaments, and receiving the Laureus World Sports Award for Comeback of the Year. She retired in November 2007 after being hampered by a hip injury for several months. In January 2008, the International Tennis Federation suspended Hingis for two years following a positive test for a metabolite of cocaine in 2007.

In July 2013, Hingis again returned from retirement to play the doubles events of the North American hardcourt season. During her doubles-only comeback, she won four major women's doubles tournaments, six major mixed doubles tournaments (completing the career Grand Slam in mixed doubles), 27 WTA Tour titles, and the silver medal in women's doubles at the 2016 Rio Olympics. Hingis retired for the third and final time after the 2017 WTA Finals, while ranked as the doubles world No. 1.

Hingis was ranked by Tennis magazine in 2005 as the eighth-greatest female player of the preceding 40 years. She was named one of the "30 Legends of Women's Tennis: Past, Present and Future" by TIME in June 2011. Hingis was the first Swiss player, male or female, to win a major title and to attain a world No. 1 ranking. In 2013, Hingis was elected into the International Tennis Hall of Fame, and was appointed two years later the organization's first ever Global Ambassador.

== Personal life ==
Hingis was born in Košice, Czechoslovakia (now in Slovakia) as Martina Hingisová, to Melanie Molitorová and Karol Hingis, both of whom were tennis players. Molitorová was a professional tennis player who was once ranked tenth among women in Czechoslovakia, and was determined to develop Hingis into a top player as early as pregnancy. Her father was ranked as high as 19th in the Czechoslovak tennis rankings. Martina Hingis spent her early childhood growing up in the town of Rožnov pod Radhoštěm (now in the Czech Republic). Hingis's parents divorced when she was six, and she and her mother defected from Czechoslovakia in 1987 and emigrated to Trübbach (Wartau) in Switzerland when she was seven. Her mother remarried to a Swiss man, Andreas Zogg, a computer technician. Hingis acquired Swiss citizenship through naturalization. Along with her native Czech and German, Hingis speaks English and French.

Hingis briefly dated Swedish tennis player Magnus Norman, from late May to mid October in 2000.

Hingis became engaged to Czech tennis player Radek Štěpánek in November 2006, but the couple broke off the engagement in August 2007. In December 2009, Hingis became engaged to then-38-year-old Andreas Bieri, a Swiss attorney she had been living with since the summer of 2009, but the couple broke off the engagement in April 2010.

On 10 December 2010, in Paris, Hingis married then-24-year-old Thibault Hutin, a French equestrian show jumper she had met at a competition in April of that year. On 8 July 2013, Hingis told the Swiss newspaper Schweizer Illustrierte the pair had been separated since the beginning of the year.

On 20 July 2018, Hingis married sports physician Harald Leemann in Switzerland in a secret ceremony at the Grand Resort Bad Ragaz. Hingis and Leemann had been in a relationship for almost a year before they got married. They were both 37. On 30 September 2018 (her 38th birthday) Hingis announced, via social media, her first pregnancy. She gave birth to a daughter, Lia, on 26 February 2019. The couple divorced in August 2022.

== Tennis career ==
Hingis began playing tennis when she was two years old and entered her first tournament at age four. In 1993, 12-year-old Hingis became the youngest player to win a Grand Slam junior title: the girls' singles at the French Open. In 1994, she retained her French Open junior title, won the girls' singles title at Wimbledon, and reached the final of the US Open.

She made her WTA debut at the Zurich Open in October 1994, two weeks after turning 14, and ended 1994 ranked world No. 87.

=== Grand Slam success and period of dominance (1996–2000) ===
==== 1996 ====
In 1996, Hingis became the youngest Grand Slam champion of all time, when she teamed with Helena Suková at Wimbledon to win the women's doubles title at age 15 years and 9 months. She also won her first professional singles title that year at Filderstadt, Germany. She reached the singles quarterfinals of the 1996 Australian Open and the singles semifinals of the 1996 US Open. Following her win at Filderstadt, Hingis defeated the reigning Australian Open champion and co-top ranked (with Steffi Graf) Monica Seles in the final in Oakland, but lost to Graf in the year-end WTA Tour Championships final in five sets.

==== 1997 ====
In 1997, Hingis became the World No. 1 women's tennis player. She started the year by winning the warm-up tournament in Sydney. She then became the youngest Grand Slam singles winner in the 20th century by winning the Australian Open at age 16 years and 3 months (beating former champion Mary Pierce in the final). She also won the Australian Open women's doubles with Natasha Zvereva. In March, she became the youngest top ranked player in history. In July, she became the youngest singles champion at Wimbledon since Lottie Dod in 1887 by beating Jana Novotná in the final. She then defeated another up-and-coming player, Venus Williams, in the final of the US Open. The only Grand Slam singles title that Hingis failed to win in 1997 was the French Open, where she lost in the final to Iva Majoli.

==== 1998: Doubles Grand Slam ====
In 1998, Hingis won all four of the Grand Slam women's doubles titles, only the fourth in women's tennis history to do so, (the Australian Open with Mirjana Lučić and the other three events with Novotná), and she became only the third woman to hold the No. 1 ranking in both singles and doubles simultaneously. She also retained her Australian Open singles title by beating Conchita Martínez in straight sets in the final. Hingis, however, lost in the final of the US Open to Lindsay Davenport. Davenport ended an 80-week stretch Hingis had enjoyed as the No. 1 singles player in October 1998, but Hingis finished the year by beating Davenport in the final of the WTA Tour Championships.

==== 1999 ====
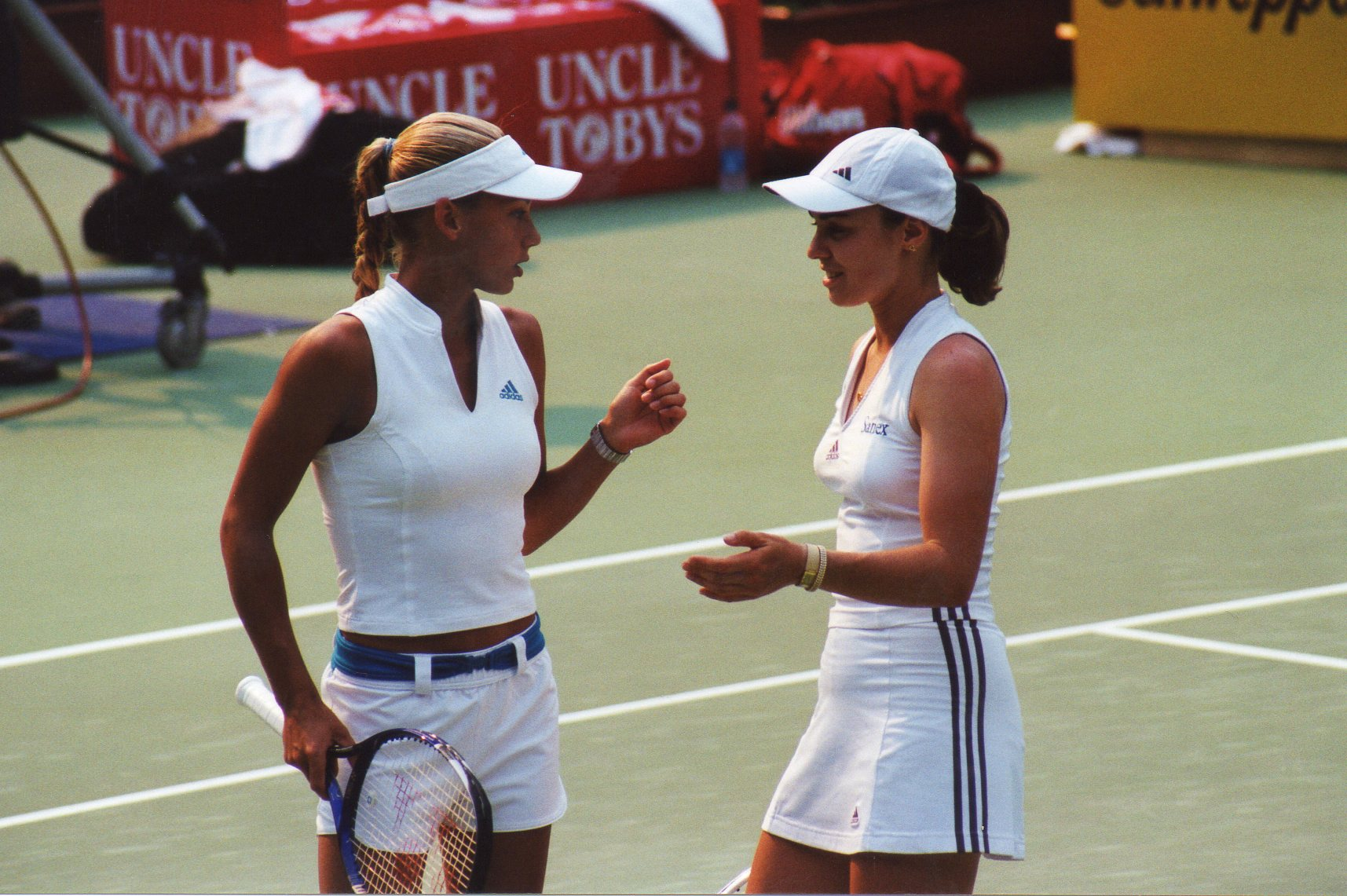
Martina Hingis (right) with doubles partner Anna Kournikova at the Sydney WTA tournament, 2002

1999 saw Hingis win her third successive Australian Open singles crown as well as the doubles title (with Anna Kournikova). She had dropped her former doubles partner Jana Novotná. She then reached the French Open final and was three points away from victory in the second set before losing to Steffi Graf about whom she had said before: "Steffi had some results in the past, but it's a faster, more athletic game now... She is old now. Her time has passed." She broke into tears after a game in which the crowd had booed her for using underhand serves and crossing the line in a discussion about an umpire decision. After a shock first-round, straight set, loss to Jelena Dokić at Wimbledon, Hingis bounced back to reach her third consecutive US Open final, where she lost to 17-year-old Serena Williams. Hingis won a total of seven singles titles that year and reclaimed the No. 1 singles ranking. She also reached the final of the WTA Tour Championships, where she lost to Lindsay Davenport.

==== 2000 ====
In 2000, Hingis again found herself in both the singles and doubles finals at the Australian Open. This time, however, she lost both. Her three-year hold on the singles championship ended when she lost to Davenport. Later, Hingis and Mary Pierce, her new doubles partner, lost to Lisa Raymond and Rennae Stubbs. Hingis captured the French Open women's doubles title with Pierce and produced consistent results in singles tournaments throughout the year. She reached the quarterfinals at Wimbledon before losing to Venus Williams. Although she did not win a Grand Slam singles tournament, the first time this had happened since 1996, she kept the year end No. 1 ranking because of nine tournament championships, including the WTA Tour Championships where she won the singles and doubles titles.

=== Injuries and first retirement from tennis (2001–2003) ===
==== 2001 ====
In 2001, Switzerland, with Hingis and Roger Federer on its team, won the Hopman Cup. Hingis didn't drop a set in any of her singles matches during the event, defeating Tamarine Tanasugarn, Nicole Pratt, Amanda Coetzer, and Monica Seles. In 2018, after his second Hopman Cup victory, Federer was quoted as saying: "I learned a lot from her, especially the two years I was here – once as a hitting partner and once as a partner with Martina. Definitely she helped me to become the player I am today."

Hingis reached her fifth consecutive Australian Open final in 2001, defeating both of the Williams sisters en route, before losing to Jennifer Capriati. She briefly ended her coaching relationship with her mother Melanie early in the year but had a change of heart two months later just before the French Open. 2001 was her least successful year in several seasons, with only three tournament victories in total. She lost her No. 1 ranking for the last time (to Jennifer Capriati) on 14 October 2001. In that same month, Hingis underwent surgery on her right ankle.

==== 2002 ====
Coming back from injury, Hingis won the Australian Open doubles final at the start of 2002 (again teaming with Anna Kournikova) and reached a sixth straight Australian Open final in singles, again facing Capriati. Hingis led by a set and 4–0 and had four match points but lost in three sets. In May 2002, she needed another ankle ligament operation, this time on her left ankle. After that, she continued to struggle with injuries and was not able to recapture her best form. At the 2002 US Open, Hingis became the first woman to receive a wildcard and be seeded in a grand slam tournament (and as of the 2026 Wimbledon this has only occurred three times in the Open Era), though she would lose to Monica Seles in the fourth round in straight sets. Hingis would drop out of the top-10 in the WTA's Rankings in October 2002.

==== 2003 ====
In February 2003, at the age of 22, Hingis announced her retirement from tennis, due to her injuries and being in pain. "I want to play tennis only for fun and concentrate more on horse riding and finish my studies." In several interviews, she indicated that she wished to return to her home country and coach full-time.

During this segment of her tennis career (until what would become her first retirement), Hingis won a total of 40 singles titles and 36 doubles. She held the world No. 1 singles ranking for a total of 209 weeks (fifth most following Steffi Graf, Martina Navratilova, Chris Evert, and Serena Williams). In 2005, Tennis magazine put her in 22nd place in its list of 40 Greatest Players of the Tennis era.

=== Return to the game (2005–2007) ===
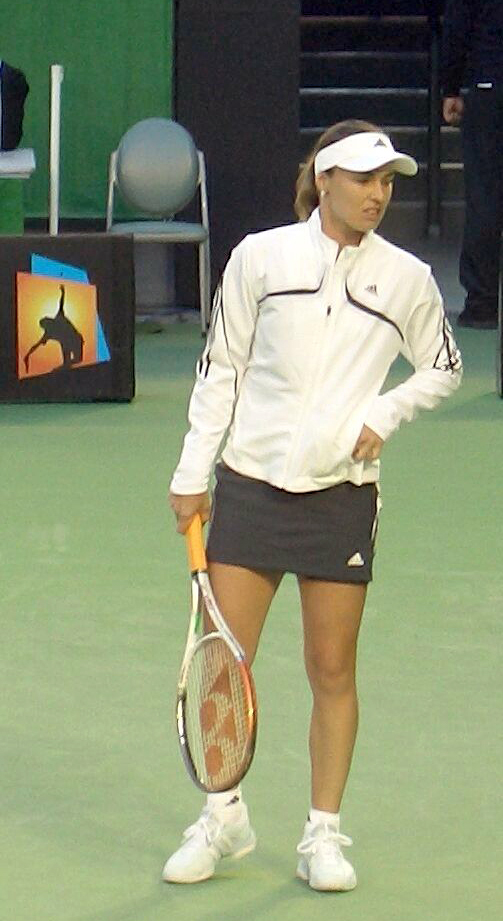
Martina Hingis at the Australian Open, 2006

==== 2005 ====
In February 2005, Hingis came out of retirement and made an unsuccessful return to competition. This took place at an event in Pattaya, Thailand, where she lost to Germany's Marlene Weingärtner in the first round. After the loss, she claimed that she had no further plans to continue further and make a full-fledged comeback.

Hingis, however, resurfaced in July, playing singles, doubles, and mixed doubles in World Team Tennis and notching up singles victories over two top 100 players and shutting out Martina Navratilova in singles on 7 July. With these promising results behind her, Hingis announced on 29 November her return to the next season's WTA Tour.

==== 2006 ====
At the Australian Open, Hingis lost in the quarterfinals to second-seeded Kim Clijsters. However, Hingis won the mixed doubles title with Mahesh Bhupathi of India. This was her first career Grand Slam mixed doubles title and fifteenth overall (5 singles, 9 women's doubles, 1 mixed doubles).

The week after the Australian Open, Hingis defeated world No. 4, Maria Sharapova, in the semifinals of the Tier I Pan Pacific Open in Tokyo, before losing in the final to world No. 9, Elena Dementieva. Hingis competed in Dubai then, reaching the quarterfinals before falling to Sharapova. At the Tier I Pacific Life Open in Indian Wells, Hingis defeated world No. 4, Lindsay Davenport in the fourth round, before again losing to Sharapova in the semifinals.

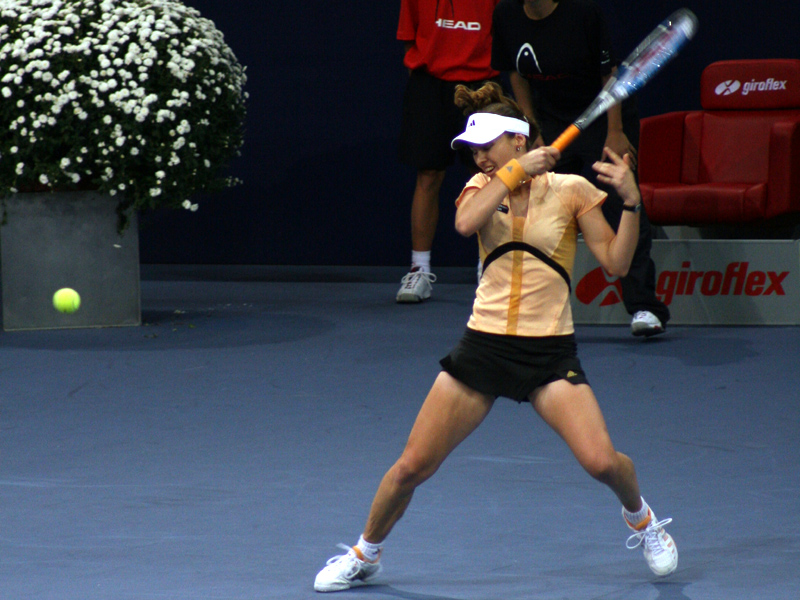
Martina Hingis at the Zurich Open, 2006

At the Tier I Italian Open in Rome, Hingis posted her 500th career singles match victory in the quarterfinals, beating world No. 18 Flavia Pennetta, and subsequently won the tournament with wins over Venus Williams in the semifinals and Dinara Safina in the final. This was her 41st WTA Tour singles title and first in more than four years. Hingis then reached the quarterfinals of the French Open before losing to Kim Clijsters.

At Wimbledon, Hingis lost in the third round to Ai Sugiyama.

Hingis's return to the US Open was short lived, as she was upset in the second round by world No. 112, Virginie Razzano of France.

In her first tournament after the US Open, Hingis won the second title of her comeback at the Tier III Sunfeast Open in Kolkata, India. She defeated unseeded Russian Olga Puchkova in the final. The following week in Seoul, Hingis notched her 50th match win of the year before losing in the second round to Sania Mirza.

Hingis qualified for the year-ending WTA Tour Championships in Madrid as the 8th seed. In her round robin matches, she lost in three sets to both Justine Henin and Amélie Mauresmo but defeated Nadia Petrova.

Hingis ended the year ranked world No. 7. She also finished eighth in prize money earnings (US$1,159,537). Hingis also ranked as No. 7 on the Annual Top Google News Searches in 2006.

==== 2007 ====
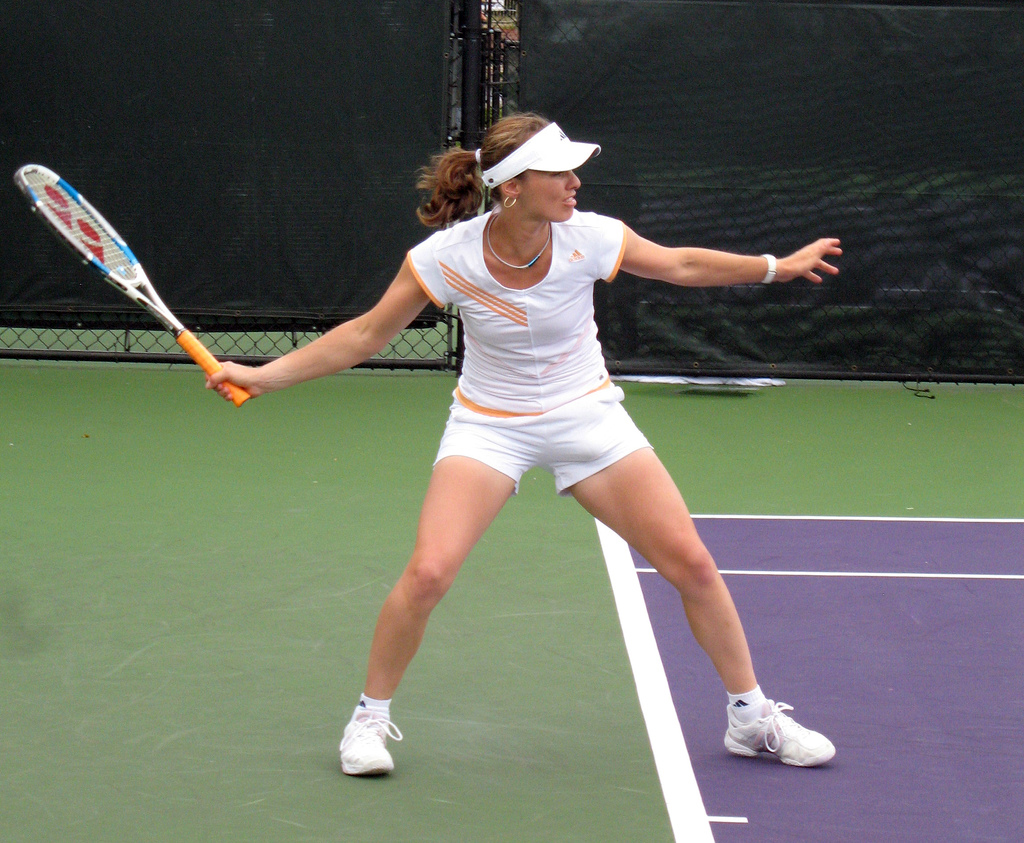
Martina Hingis in Miami, Florida, 2007

At the Australian Open, Hingis won her first three rounds without losing a set before defeating China's Li Na in the fourth round. Hingis then lost a quarterfinal match to Kim Clijsters. This was the second consecutive year that Hingis had lost to Clijsters in the quarterfinals of the Australian Open and the third time in the last five Grand Slam tournaments that Clijsters had eliminated Hingis in the quarterfinals.

Hingis won her next tournament, the Tier I Toray Pan Pacific Open in Tokyo, defeating Ana Ivanovic in the final. This was Hingis's record fifth singles title at this event.

A hip injury that troubled her at the German Open caused her to withdraw from the Rome Masters, where she was the defending champion, and the French Open, the only important singles title that eluded her.

In her first round match at Wimbledon, Hingis saved two match points to defeat British wildcard Naomi Cavaday, apparently not having fully recovered from the hip injury that prevented her from playing the French Open. In the third round, Hingis lost to Laura Granville of the United States, and stated afterwards she should not have entered the tournament.

Hingis's next tournament was the last Grand Slam tournament of the year, the US Open, in which Hingis lost in the third round to Belarusian teenager Victoria Azarenka. Hingis did not play any tournaments after the China Open, as she was beset by injuries for the rest of the year.

=== ITF suspension and second retirement (2007–2012) ===
In November 2007, Hingis called a press conference to announce that she was under investigation for testing positive for benzoylecgonine, a metabolite of cocaine, during a urine test taken by players at Wimbledon. Hingis's urine sample contained an estimated 42 nanograms per millilitre of benzoylecgonine. The International Tennis Federation's report on the matter states that "the very low estimated concentration of benzoylecgonine (42 ng/ml) was such that it would go unreported in many drug testing programmes such as that of the US military, which uses a screening threshold of 150 ng/ml." As the amount was so low, Hingis appealed, arguing the likely cause was contamination rather than intentional ingestion. In January 2008, the ITF's tribunal suspended Hingis from the sport for two years, effective from October 2007.

At the time of Hingis's suspension, the ITF required an automatic two-year suspension for any players who tested positive for banned substances, regardless of extenuating circumstances such as contamination or extremely low detection levels. The ITF subsequently altered the suspension rules as a result of the Hingis case, allowing for future flexibility in cases of unintentional or unexplained ingestion.

==== 2008–09 ====
Having retired for the second time in 2007, Hingis played an exhibition match at the Liverpool International tournament on 13 June 2008. Although this event was a warm-up for Wimbledon, it was not part of the WTA Tour. In a rematch of their 1997 Wimbledon final, Hingis defeated Jana Novotná.

In 2009, Hingis took part in the British television dancing competition Strictly Come Dancing. She was the bookies' favourite for the competition, but went out in the first week after performing a waltz and a rumba.

==== 2010 ====
At the start of 2010, Hingis defeated former world No. 1 Lindsay Davenport, and hinted at a possible return to tennis. In February, she announced having committed to a full season with the World TeamTennis tour in 2010. She had previously played for World TeamTennis in 2005 to assist her first comeback. Sparking thoughts that she was trying to come back to the WTA Tour, she committed to playing at the Nottingham Masters. On 5 May 2010, it was announced that Hingis would reunite with her doubles partner Anna Kournikova. Kournikova was participating in competitive tennis for the first time in seven years, in the Invitational Ladies Doubles event at Wimbledon. Hingis also confirmed that she would play at the Tradition-ICAP Liverpool International championship in June 2010, preceding Wimbledon, before playing in the Manchester Masters after Wimbledon. Liverpool like the Nottingham and Manchester Masters are organised by her management company Northern Vision. At the Nottingham Masters, Hingis faced Michaëlla Krajicek (twice), Olga Savchuk and Monika Wejnert. Hingis won just once in the event, against Wejnert. After the Nottingham event, Billie Jean King stated that she believed that Hingis might return to the WTA Tour on the doubles circuit, after competing in the WTT.

==== 2011 ====
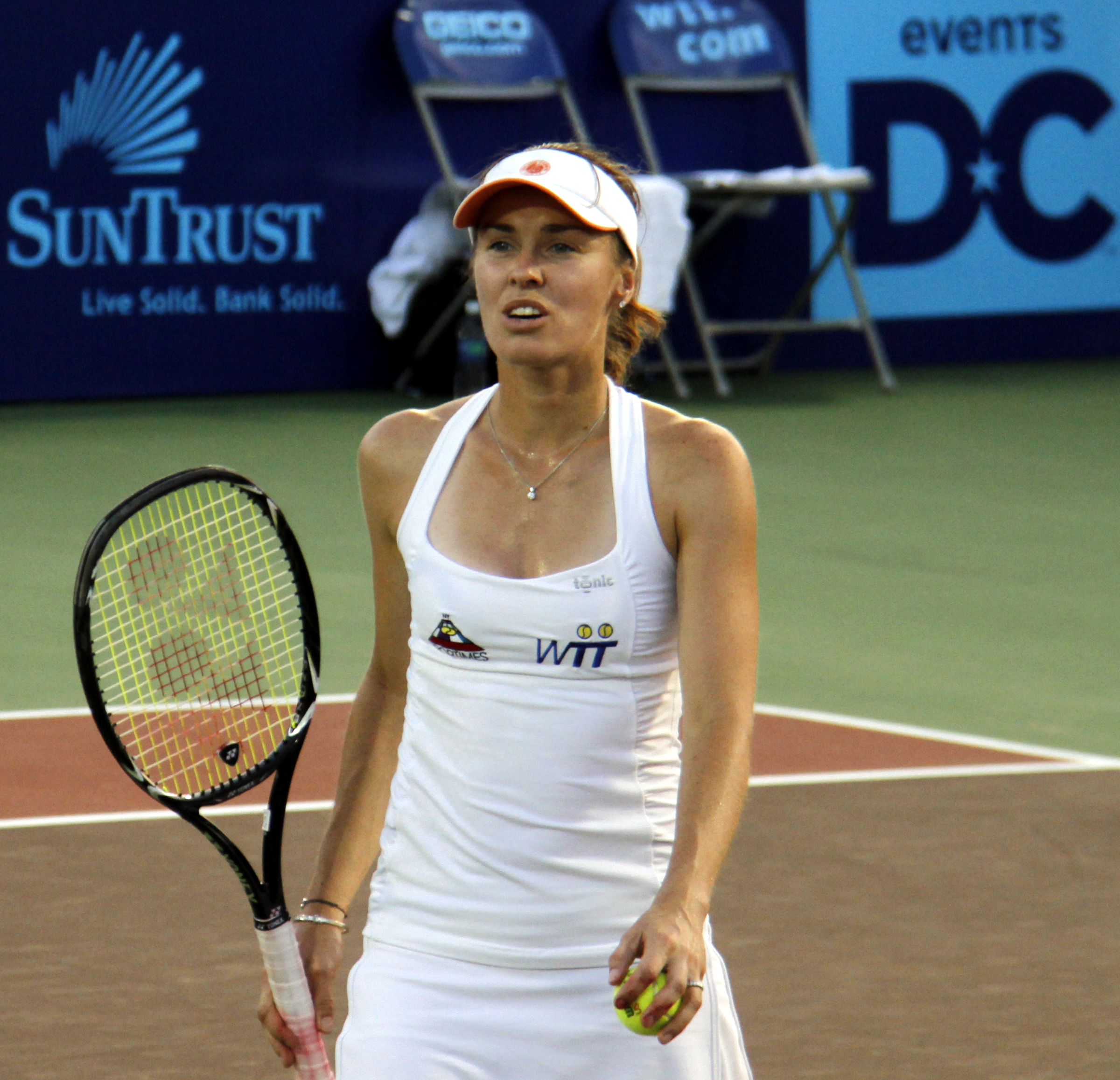
Martina Hingis with the New York Sportimes, 2011

On 5 June 2011, Hingis, paired with Lindsay Davenport, won the Roland Garros Women's Legends title, defeating Martina Navratilova and Jana Novotná in the final. Before facing Navratilova/Novotná, Hingis and Davenport won two round-robin matches in the tournament: first against Gigi Fernández/Natasha Zvereva, and then in the next match they prevailed over Andrea Temesvári/Sandrine Testud and 10:0 in the super tie-break.

On 3 July, Hingis partnering Lindsay Davenport won the Wimbledon Ladies' Invitation Doubles title, defeating Navratilova and Novotná in the final. She also played for the New York Sportimes of the World TeamTennis Pro League in July 2011. She finished the season with the top winning percentage of any player competing in women's singles.

==== 2012 ====
Hingis and Davenport successfully defended their Wimbledon Ladies' Invitation Doubles title in 2012, again beating Martina Navratilova and Jana Novotná in the final.

=== Second return and doubles success (2013–2017) ===
==== 2013: Coming out of retirement ====
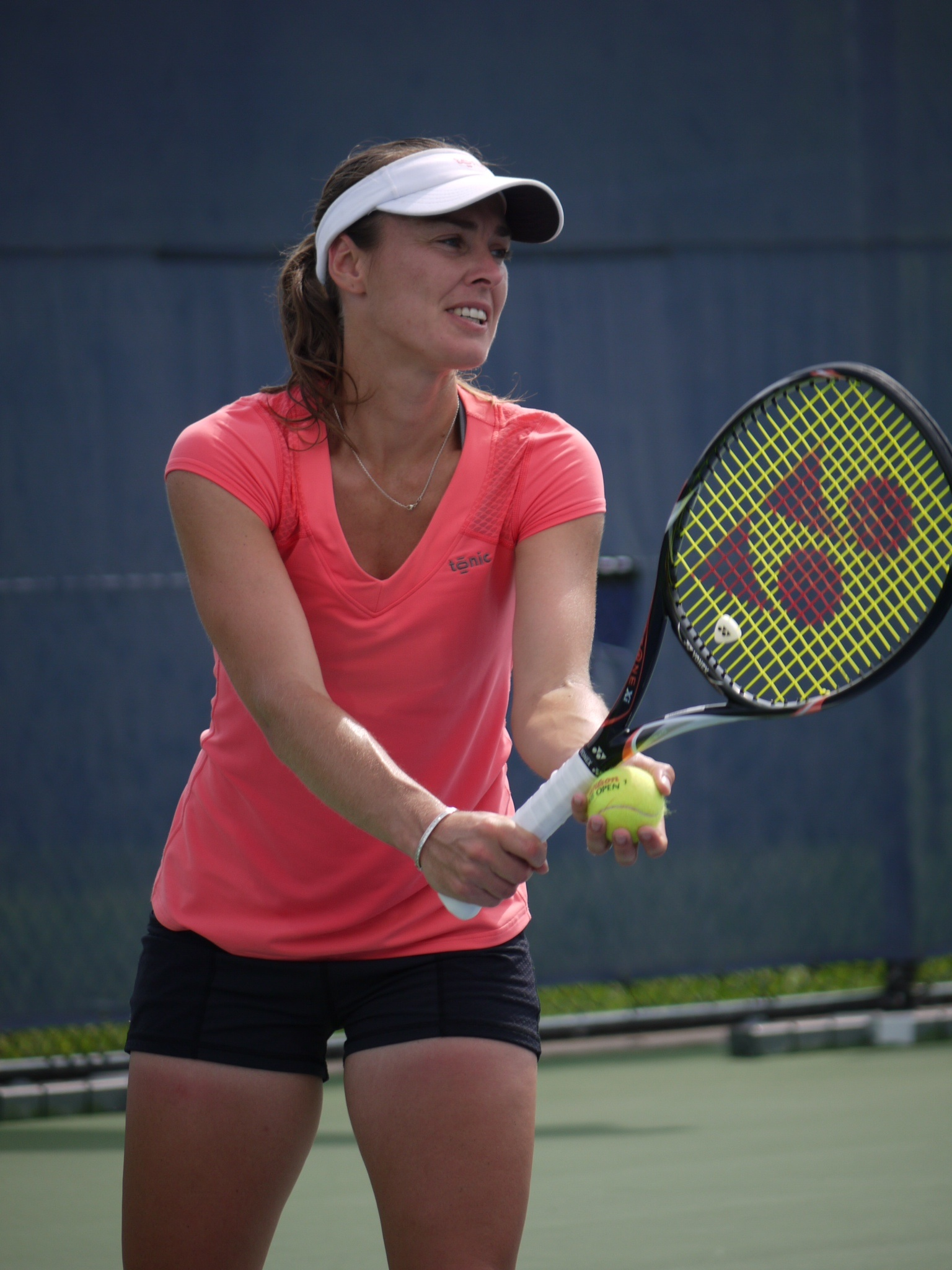
Hingis practicing at the Rogers Cup in Toronto, August 2013

In April 2013, Hingis agreed to coach Anastasia Pavlyuchenkova; however, after a disagreement about how to prepare for tournaments they parted ways in June.

Hingis won the Ladies' Invitation Doubles for a third year in a row at Wimbledon, again with Davenport. They beat Jana Novotná and Barbara Schett in the final. Hingis was inducted into the International Tennis Hall of Fame in July 2013, and in the same month, announced that she was coming out of retirement to play a doubles tournament, with Daniela Hantuchová as her partner, in Carlsbad, California. She was accepted as a wildcard entry. She also played doubles in Toronto, Cincinnati, New Haven, and the US Open.

==== 2014: US Open doubles finalist ====
Hingis helped Sabine Lisicki during the Australian Open. She participated in Champions Tennis League India to boost tennis in the country.

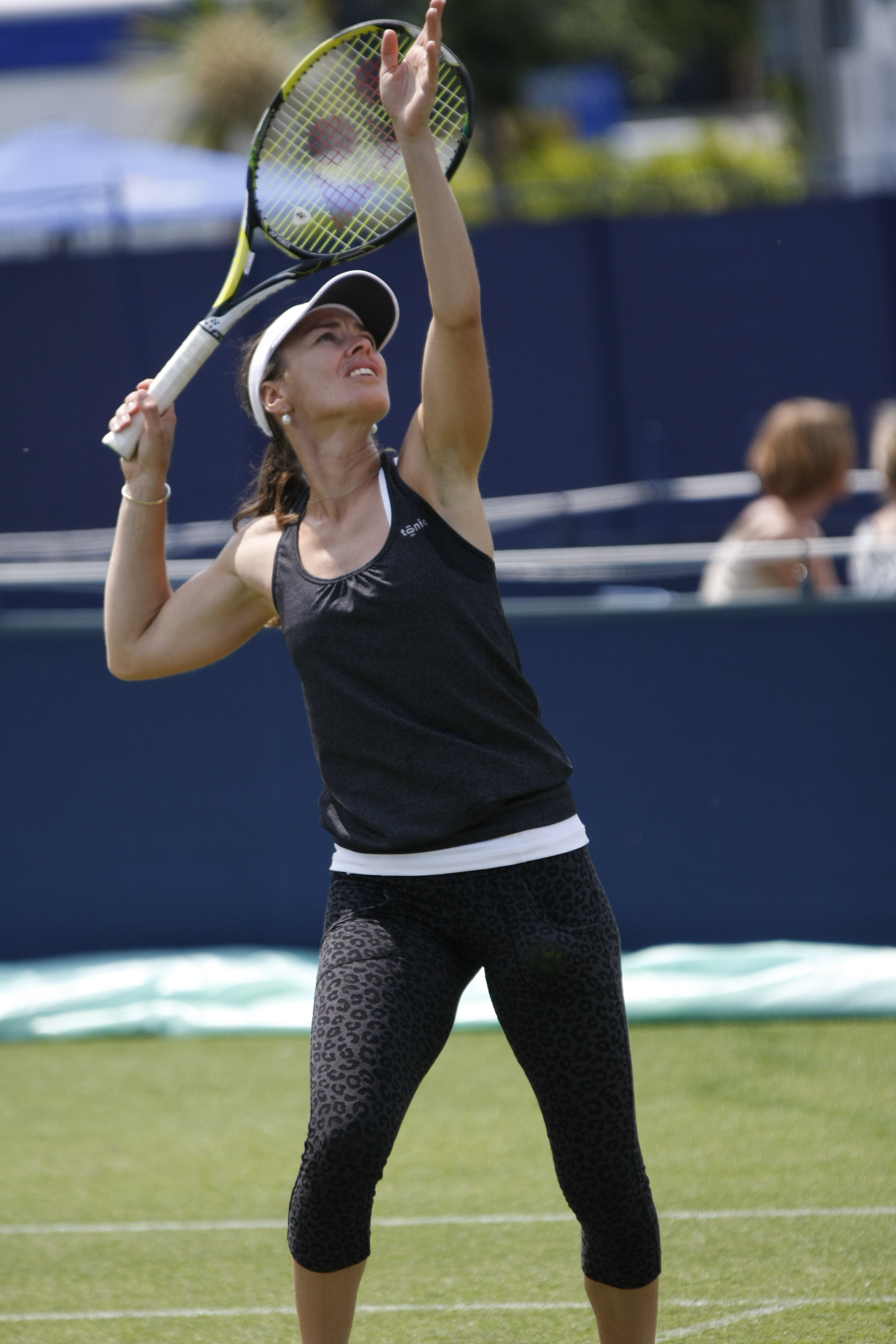
Hingis at Eastbourne International, June 2014

Hingis returned to the WTA Tour at Indian Wells, partnering Lisicki in the doubles. They lost in the first round to three-time Grand Slam finalists Ashleigh Barty and Casey Dellacqua. At the Miami Open, Hingis and Lisicki reached the finals of the tournament and then defeated Makarova and Vesnina in straight sets, marking Hingis's first title since she won the Qatar Ladies Open in 2007 and her first Premier Mandatory doubles title since winning the 2001 title in Moscow. This was also her third win in Miami, having won her last title there in 1999.

Hingis reached the final at Eastbourne with Pennetta where they lost to Chan Hao-ching and Chan Yung-jan of Taiwan. At the Wimbledon Championships, she reached the quarterfinals with partner Bruno Soares in mixed doubles, where they lost to Daniel Nestor and Kristina Mladenovic in straight sets.

Entering as an unseeded team at the US Open, Hingis and Pennetta reached the final, without losing a set in any of their matches. In the final they lost to Makarova and Vesnina in three sets.

At the latter end of the season, Hingis and Flavia Pennetta won two titles. At the tournament in Wuhan, they beat Cara Black and Caroline Garcia to take the title; in Moscow they beat Caroline Garcia and Arantxa Parra Santonja.

==== 2015: Five major doubles titles ====
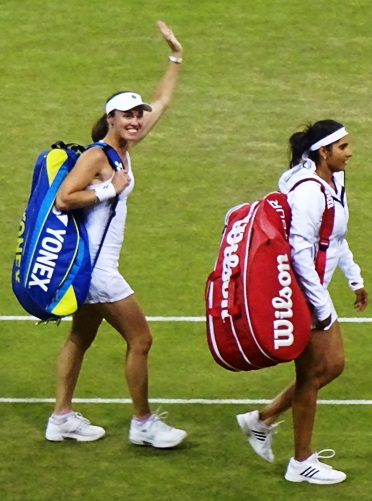
Hingis and Mirza after winning the 2015 Wimbledon doubles title

In her first tournament of the year in Brisbane, Hingis and partner Sabine Lisicki didn't drop a set en route to the title, beating Caroline Garcia and Katarina Srebotnik in straight sets in the final. Hingis played at the Australian Open with Flavia Pennetta, as the fourth seeds, but lost in the third round. However, Hingis paired with Leander Paes in the mixed doubles to win the title. The win was her first in a major event since capturing the mixed-doubles crown at the 2006 Australian Open.

After early exits with Pennetta at the Dubai Tennis Championships and Qatar Ladies Open, Hingis then partnered with Indian player Sania Mirza; they won the first 20 sets they contested, subsequently winning back-to-back titles in two WTA Premier Mandatory events: the Indian Wells Open and the Miami Open, also winning afterwise the Family Circle Cup. They were defeated in the first round in Stuttgart. At the Madrid Open they lost in the quarterfinals to Australian Open champions Bethanie Mattek-Sands and Lucie Šafářová 11–9 in the super tie-break. They reached the quarterfinals of the French Open, losing again to Mattek-Sands and Šafářová, this time in straight sets.

Hingis made a comeback in Fed Cup after a 17-year absence. She was scheduled to play doubles only, but then decided to try another comeback in singles by playing in the Fed Cup tie for Switzerland. She drew Agnieszka Radwańska in the first rubber and was defeated in two sets in her first official tour match since 2007. She lost her second singles rubber too, defeated by Urszula Radwańska in three sets, having been a set and a double break up.

On 11 July 2015, Hingis and Mirza beat Makarova and Vesnina in three tight sets, recovering from 5–2 down in the third to win the women's doubles tournament at Wimbledon. The win gave Hingis her first Grand Slam in women's doubles since the 2002 Australian Open. The following day, Hingis then won the mixed doubles final, partnering with Leander Paes, to defeat Alexander Peya and Tímea Babos in straight sets.

After two semifinal losses in Toronto and Cincinnati, Hingis won the mixed doubles title at the US Open on 12 September, partnering Paes, defeating Sam Querrey and Bethanie Mattek-Sands in three sets. The following day, Hingis and Mirza beat Casey Dellacqua and Yaroslava Shvedova in straight sets to win the doubles tournament. At the WTA Finals, they won all their group matches, including against Kops-Jones/Spears, Hlaváčková/Hradecká and Babos/Mladenovic. In the semifinals they beat the Chan sisters, and then they beat the Spanish team Muguruza/Suárez Navarro to win the title. That month Hingis participated at the Champions Tennis League in India, playing for the Hyderabad Aces team.

==== 2016: Mixed-doubles career Grand Slam ====
In January, Hingis and Mirza won at Brisbane and Sydney. They then won the doubles tournament at the Australian Open, defeating Hlaváčková and Hradecká in the final, for their third consecutive Grand Slam title. Afterwards, Hingis said of their partnership: "There's not that many people who can match her in the forehand rallies and me on the backhand side and at the net. That's what we try to do every match." In mixed doubles, Hingis and Paes lost in the quarterfinals to Mirza and Ivan Dodig.

In February, Hingis represented Switzerland in the Fed Cup tie against Germany alongside Belinda Bencic and Timea Bacsinszky. Switzerland beat Germany 3–2, with Hingis and Bencic clinching the doubles rubber. Switzerland advanced to the semifinals, where the team lost to the defending champions of the Czech Republic.

The Hingis-Mirza winning-streak record of 41 matches ended in the quarterfinals of the Qatar Ladies Open, where they lost to Kasatkina/Vesnina. Hingis and Mirza then proceeded to the Indian Wells Open to defend their title. However, they suffered a shock as the unseeded Vania King/Alla Kudryavtseva defeated them in straight sets.

At the Miami Open, Mirza and Hingis lost in the second round to Margarita Gasparyan and Monica Niculescu.

Hingis and Mirza started their clay season by reaching the finals of Porsche Tennis Grand Prix and Madrid Open, where they lost to Kristina Mladenovic and Caroline Garcia in both the tournaments. However, they won the Italian Open, defeating Makarova and Vesnina. At the French Open, they were upset by Czech pair Barbora Krejčíková and Kateřina Siniaková in the third round, which ended their 20 match winning streak in Grand Slam doubles tournaments.

Hingis won the French Open mixed doubles partnering Leander Paes. It is her first mixed doubles title at Roland Garros, and she completed the mixed-doubles career Grand Slam, becoming only the fourth woman ever to complete a career Grand Slam in both women's doubles and mixed doubles.

Hingis qualified for the 2016 Summer Olympics in Rio de Janeiro, 20 years after her last Olympic appearance. She played doubles with Timea Bacsinszky and won the silver medal, losing to Ekaterina Makarova and Elena Vesnina in straight sets in the final. Hingis then played at the US Open with CoCo Vandeweghe, where they made the semifinals and lost to top seeds Garcia and Mladenovic. At the WTA Finals, Hingis reunited with Sania Mirza in what would be the partnership's last tournament together; they defeated the Chan sisters in the quarterfinals but then lost to Makarova and Vesnina.

==== 2017: Three major doubles titles, back to world No. 1, final retirement ====
Hingis continued to partner CoCo Vandeweghe in women's doubles competition at the start of the season. Together they reached the quarterfinals of the Sydney International, losing to eventual champions Tímea Babos and Anastasia Pavlyuchenkova, and the second round of the Australian Open, losing to the Australian duo of Ashleigh Barty and Casey Dellacqua. This capped a run of poor form, having gone 5–5 in tournaments since they made the semifinals at the US Open the previous season. As a result, Hingis split with Vandeweghe and entered a new partnership with Taiwan's Chan Yung-jan, who herself had just split with her sister Hao-ching. In the mixed doubles competition at the Australian Open, Hingis reached the quarterfinals with Leander Paes before losing to another Australian duo, Samantha Stosur and Sam Groth in straight sets.

In preparation for the upcoming Fed Cup quarterfinal match between Switzerland and France, Hingis partnered with Belinda Bencic to defend her St. Petersburg title. The pair lost in the first round to Gabriela Dabrowski and Michaëlla Krajicek. In the Fed Cup quarterfinal match, Hingis instead paired up with Timea Bacsinszky and won their doubles match against Amandine Hesse and Kristina Mladenovic, helping the team to a 4–1 victory to advance to the semifinals.

In the first two tournaments of their new partnership, Hingis and Chan suffered some "tough" losses. They fell to Olga Savchuk and Yaroslava Shvedova in the semifinals of the Qatar Open and to Andrea Hlaváčková and Peng Shuai in straight sets in the quarterfinals of the Dubai Tennis Championships. However, they immediately rebounded by winning their first title together at the Indian Wells Open, defeating Hingis's old partner Sania Mirza with Barbora Strýcová in the quarterfinals, top seeded Mattek-Sands and Šafářová in the semifinals, and Czech pair Lucie Hradecká and Kateřina Siniaková in the final. They then reached the semifinals of the Miami Open, before losing to Mirza and Strýcová.

Hingis again sought to practice with a Swiss partner before the Fed Cup semifinal clash of Switzerland versus Belarus, and this time paired up with Bacsinszky to enter the inaugural Ladies Open Biel Bienne. Hingis and Bacsinszky reached the final, succumbing there to Hsieh Su-wei and Monica Niculescu. Despite winning her doubles rubber with Bacsinszky in the Fed Cup semifinal tie, Switzerland would ultimately lose 2–3. Switzerland had been seeking to reach its first final since Hingis had spearheaded the team to a narrow defeat to Spain in 1998.

In the clay-court season, Hingis and Chan continued their good form to win back-to-back titles at the Madrid and Italian Opens, defeating Tímea Babos and Andrea Hlaváčková and Ekaterina Makarova and Elena Vesnina respectively, in the finals of each event. Hingis's victory in Madrid was her 100th WTA career title. This success marked the pair as one of the pre-tournament favorites to win the French Open. Hingis and Chan reached the semifinals, where their 12 match winning streak was ended by eventual champions Mattek-Sands and Šafářová. Hingis and Paes lost in the opening round of the mixed doubles competition to Katarina Srebotnik and Raven Klaasen in a super tiebreak.

Hingis and Chan again won back-to-back titles, this time at the Mallorca Open and the Eastbourne International. At Mallorca, they won the title by walkover after Jelena Janković and Anastasija Sevastova withdrew from the title match owing to an injury sustained by Sevastova in the singles competition. At Eastbourne, they won after defeating Barty and Dellacqua in the final. However, like the French Open two months previous, Hingis and Chan could not replicate the success at Grand Slam level: losing at the quarterfinal stage to Grönefeld and Peschke at Wimbledon. In the mixed doubles competition, Hingis paired up with new partner Great Britain's Jamie Murray after splitting from Leander Paes. As top seeds they reached the final without losing a set, before defeating defending champions Heather Watson and Henri Kontinen in the championship match.

Hingis and Chan next played at the Canadian Open, where the German-Czech pair of Grönefeld and Peschke defeated them for the second tournament in a row in the quarterfinals. However, not to be deterred, a week later at the Cincinnati Open they produced another winning run and defeated Hsieh and Niculescu in the final to capture their next title together. On 14 August, Hingis and Chan became one of the first teams to qualify for the doubles competition at the year-end WTA Finals.

At the US Open, Hingis emerged victorious from both the women's and the mixed doubles competition. Jamie Murray and she defeated Chan Hao-ching and Michael Venus in the final to capture their second consecutive title together and remain undefeated as a pair. Then, less than 24 hours later with Chan, they defeated Hradecká and Siniaková in the final to win their first major title together. In total, this was Hingis's 25th Grand Slam title across all disciplines.

Hingis and Chan extended their winning run to 18 matches in China by winning their third and fourth straight titles: the Wuhan and China Opens. In Wuhan, they defeated Shuko Aoyama and Yang Zhaoxuan in the final. With this win, Hingis ascended to the No. 1 ranking on 2 October for the 67th week in her career. In Beijing, they defeated Babos and Hlaváčková.

Hingis announced her retirement at the WTA Finals in Singapore in October 2017.

== Playing style ==
Hingis was an all-court player who possessed an intelligent, crafty game. Hingis compensated for her lack of power with superior movement, anticipation, finesse, point construction, shot selection, and knowledge of the geometry of the court. Hingis used a semi-western grip for her forehand, allowing her to create sharp angles and dictate play. Her two-handed backhand was her most effective groundstroke, and was used to redirect power down the line. She could also hit her backhand one-handed with slice, and would use this shot to break up the pace of rallies. Her serve was not particularly powerful, and she rarely served aces, but was reliable, and she was proficient at defending her serve. Although her serve had been recorded as high as 111 mph (179 km/h), her first serve was typically delivered at 95 mph (153 km/h), and her second serve speed averaged 79 mph (127 km/h). She was one of the most effective returners on the WTA tour, positioning herself on the baseline to return first serves, and her superior sense of anticipation allowed her to read serves effectively. Due to her doubles experience, Hingis was one of the most effective players at the net on the WTA tour, possessing an almost complete repertoire of shots at the net, and she would frequently choose to finish points off at the net.

== Career statistics ==
=== Singles performance timeline ===
Key
W	F	SF	QF	#R	RR	Q#	DNQ	A	NH

(W) winner; (F) finalist; (SF) semifinalist; (QF) quarterfinalist; (#R) rounds 4, 3, 2, 1; (RR) round-robin stage; (Q#) qualification round; (DNQ) did not qualify; (A) absent; (NH) not held; (SR) strike rate (events won / competed); (W–L) win–loss record.

Tournament	1994	1995	1996	1997	1998	1999	2000	2001	2002	2003	2004	2005	2006	2007	SR	W–L
Australian Open	A	2R	QF	W	W	W	F	F	F	A	A	A	QF	QF	3 / 10	52–7
French Open	A	3R	3R	F	SF	F	SF	SF	A	A	A	A	QF	A	0 / 8	35–8
Wimbledon	A	1R	4R	W	SF	1R	QF	1R	A	A	A	A	3R	3R	1 / 9	23–8
US Open	A	4R	SF	W	F	F	SF	SF	4R	A	A	A	2R	3R	1 / 10	43–9
Grand Slam W–L	0–0	6–4	14–4	27–1	23–3	19–3	20–4	16–4	9–2	0–0	0–0	0–0	11–4	8–3	5 / 37	153–32
WTA Tour Championships	DNQ	DNQ	F	QF	W	F	W	A	A	A	A	A	RR	A	2 / 6	16–5

- ^{2}If ITF Women's Circuit (hardcourt: 12–2; carpet: 6–1) and Fed Cup (10–0) participations are included, overall win–loss record: 548–133.

==== Grand Slam singles finals: 12 (5–7) ====
Result	Year	Championship	Surface	Opponent	Score
Win	1997	Australian Open	Hard	(France) Mary Pierce	6–2, 6–2
Loss	1997	French Open	Clay	(Croatia) Iva Majoli	4–6, 2–6
Win	1997	Wimbledon	Grass	(Czech Republic) Jana Novotná	2–6, 6–3, 6–3
Win	1997	US Open	Hard	(United States) Venus Williams	6–0, 6–4
Win	1998	Australian Open (2)	Hard	(Spain) Conchita Martínez	6–3, 6–3
Loss	1998	US Open	Hard	(United States) Lindsay Davenport	3–6, 5–7
Win	1999	Australian Open (3)	Hard	(France) Amélie Mauresmo	6–2, 6–3
Loss	1999	French Open	Clay	(Germany) Steffi Graf	6–4, 5–7, 2–6
Loss	1999	US Open	Hard	(United States) Serena Williams	3–6, 6–7^{(4–7)}
Loss	2000	Australian Open	Hard	(United States) Lindsay Davenport	1–6, 5–7
Loss	2001	Australian Open	Hard	(United States) Jennifer Capriati	4–6, 3–6
Loss	2002	Australian Open	Hard	(United States) Jennifer Capriati	6–4, 6–7^{(7–9)}, 2–6

=== Doubles ===
Tournament	1994	1995	1996	1997	1998	1999	2000	2001	2002	2003–06	2007	2008–12	2013	2014	2015	2016	2017	SR	W–L
Australian Open	A	1R	1R	W	W	W	F	SF	W	A	2R	A	A	A	3R	W	2R	5 / 12	43–7
French Open	A	A	QF	SF	W	F	W	A	A	A	A	A	A	A	QF	3R	SF	2 / 8	33–6
Wimbledon	A	2R	W	QF	W	A	2R	A	A	A	A	A	A	1R	W	QF	QF	3 / 9	29–6
US Open	A	3R	SF	SF	W	A	3R	QF	QF	A	3R	A	1R	F	W	SF	W	3 / 13	47–9
Grand Slam Win–Loss	0–0	3–3	13–3	17–3	24–0	11–1	14–2	7–2	9–1	0–0	3–2	0–0	0–1	5–2	17–2	15–3	14–3	13 / 42	152–28
Tour Championships	A	A	QF	QF	QF	W	W	A	A	A	A	A	A	A	W	SF	SF	3 / 8	13–5

==== Grand Slam doubles finals: 16 (13–3) ====
By winning the 1998 US Open title, Hingis completed the doubles Career Grand Slam, becoming the 17th female player in history to achieve this, as well as the youngest. It also meant she completed the Calendar Year Grand Slam, becoming the fourth woman in history to achieve the feat in doubles.

Result	Year	Championship	Surface	Partner	Opponents	Score
Win	1996	Wimbledon	Grass	(Czech Republic) Helena Suková	(United States) Meredith McGrath (Latvia) Larisa Savchenko Neiland	5–7, 7–5, 6–1
Win	1997	Australian Open	Hard	(Belarus) Natasha Zvereva	(United States) Lindsay Davenport (United States) Lisa Raymond	6–2, 6–2
Win	1998	Australian Open (2)	Hard	(Croatia) Mirjana Lučić	(United States) Lindsay Davenport (Belarus) Natasha Zvereva	6–4, 2–6, 6–3
Win	1998	French Open	Clay	(Czechoslovakia) Jana Novotná	(United States) Lindsay Davenport (Belarus) Natasha Zvereva	6–1, 7–6^{(7–4)}
Win	1998	Wimbledon (2)	Grass	(Czechoslovakia) Jana Novotná	(United States) Lindsay Davenport (Belarus) Natasha Zvereva	6–3, 3–6, 8–6
Win	1998	US Open	Hard	(Czechoslovakia) Jana Novotná	(United States) Lindsay Davenport (Belarus) Natasha Zvereva	6–3, 6–3
Win	1999	Australian Open (3)	Hard	(Russia) Anna Kournikova	(United States) Lindsay Davenport (Belarus) Natasha Zvereva	7–5, 6–3
Loss	1999	French Open	Clay	(Russia) Anna Kournikova	(United States) Serena Williams (United States) Venus Williams	3–6, 7–6^{(7–2)}, 6–8
Loss	2000	Australian Open	Hard	(France) Mary Pierce	(United States) Lisa Raymond (Australia) Rennae Stubbs	4–6, 7–5, 4–6
Win	2000	French Open (2)	Clay	(France) Mary Pierce	(Spain) Virginia Ruano Pascual (Argentina) Paola Suárez	6–2, 6–4
Win	2002	Australian Open (4)	Hard	(Russia) Anna Kournikova	(Slovakia) Daniela Hantuchová (Spain) Arantxa Sánchez Vicario	6–2, 6–7^{(4–7)}, 6–1
Loss	2014	US Open	Hard	(Italy) Flavia Pennetta	(Russia) Ekaterina Makarova (Russia) Elena Vesnina	6–2, 3–6, 2–6
Win	2015	Wimbledon (3)	Grass	(India) Sania Mirza	(Russia) Ekaterina Makarova (Russia) Elena Vesnina	5–7, 7–6^{(7–4)}, 7–5
Win	2015	US Open (2)	Hard	(India) Sania Mirza	(Australia) Casey Dellacqua (Kazakhstan) Yaroslava Shvedova	6–3, 6–3
Win	2016	Australian Open (5)	Hard	(India) Sania Mirza	(Czech Republic) Andrea Hlaváčková (Czech Republic) Lucie Hradecká	7–6^{(7–1)}, 6–3
Win	2017	US Open (3)	Hard	(Chinese Taipei) Chan Yung-jan	(Czech Republic) Lucie Hradecká (Czech Republic) Kateřina Siniaková	6–3, 6–2

=== Mixed doubles ===
Tournament	1996	1997	1998–99	2000	2001–05	2006	2007–12	2013	2014	2015	2016	2017	SR	W–L
Australian Open	A	A	A	A	A	W	A	A	A	W	QF	QF	2 / 4	14–2
French Open	QF	A	A	A	A	2R	A	A	A	2R	W	1R	1 / 5	9–3
Wimbledon	2R	QF	A	A	A	A	A	A	QF	W	3R	W	2 / 6	17–4
US Open	SF	A	A	QF	A	A	A	1R	A	W	2R	W	2 / 6	14–3
Win–loss	6–3	3–1	0–0	2–0	0–0	6–0	0–0	0–1	2–1	14–1	9–3	12–2	7 / 21	54–12

==== Mixed doubles finals: 7 (7–0) ====
By winning the 2016 French Open title, Hingis completed the mixed doubles Career Grand Slam. She became the 7th female player in history to achieve this.

Result	Year	Championship	Surface	Partner	Opponents	Score
Win	2006	Australian Open	Hard	(India) Mahesh Bhupathi	(Russia) Elena Likhovtseva (Canada) Daniel Nestor	6–3, 6–3
Win	2015	Australian Open (2)	Hard	(India) Leander Paes	(France) Kristina Mladenovic (Canada) Daniel Nestor	6–4, 6–3
Win	2015	Wimbledon	Grass	(India) Leander Paes	(Hungary) Tímea Babos (Austria) Alexander Peya	6–1, 6–1
Win	2015	US Open	Hard	(India) Leander Paes	(United States) Bethanie Mattek-Sands (United States) Sam Querrey	6–4, 3–6, [10–7]
Win	2016	French Open	Clay	(India) Leander Paes	(India) Sania Mirza (Croatia) Ivan Dodig	4–6, 6–4, [10–8]
Win	2017	Wimbledon (2)	Grass	(United Kingdom) Jamie Murray	(United Kingdom) Heather Watson (Finland) Henri Kontinen	6–4, 6–4
Win	2017	US Open (2)	Hard	(United Kingdom) Jamie Murray	(Chinese Taipei) Chan Hao-ching (New Zealand) Michael Venus	6–1, 4–6, [10–8]

== Records ==
- These records were attained in the Open Era of tennis.

Grand Slam	Years	Record accomplished	Player tied
Australian Open	1997–99	3 consecutive titles	Margaret Court; Evonne Goolagong Cawley; Steffi Graf; Monica Seles
Australian Open	1997–2002	6 consecutive finals	Evonne Goolagong Cawley
Grand Slam	1997	2 wins without losing a set in the same calendar year	Billie Jean King; Martina Navratilova; Steffi Graf; Serena Williams; Justine Henin
Grand Slam	1997	Reached all four Grand Slam finals in a calendar year	Margaret Court; Chris Evert; Martina Navratilova; Steffi Graf; Monica Seles; Justine Henin
Grand Slam	1998	Calendar Year Women's Doubles Grand Slam	Martina Navratilova; Pam Shriver

- By winning Wimbledon doubles title in 1996 with Helena Suková became youngest doubles winner at 15 years, 282 days and youngest ever Grand Slam winner.
- By winning Australian singles title in 1997, became youngest winner there in tennis history at 16 years and 3 months.
- By defeating Monica Seles 6–2, 6–1 in 1997 at Key Biscayne, ascended the no. 1 spot as the youngest ever in tennis history.
- Became the youngest ever year-end No.1 in 1997 in tennis history.
- By winning the US Open against Venus Williams in 1997, Hingis contended all Grand Slam tournament finals that year; second youngest winner in the US Open at 16 years, 11 months and 8 days.
- Won the Australian and US Open in 1997 without losing a set.
- In 1997, from Sydney to the final of Roland Garros had a 37-match winning streak, best from 1995 until present.
- By winning the US Open doubles title in 1998 with Jana Novotná, completed a doubles Grand Slam, third player in the Open Era.
- Held simultaneously the no. 1 position for singles and doubles in 1998.
- Most successful player to play the Toray Pan-Pacific Tournament with 5 wins in 1997, 1999, 2000, 2002, 2007, and reached 8 finals in 1997, 1998, 1999, 2000, 2001, 2002, 2006, 2007.
- Compiled 103 top-10 wins (behind Serena Williams 164, Lindsay Davenport 129, and Venus Williams 127), 43 singles titles, 64 doubles titles, 7 mixed doubles titles, and 209 weeks at no.1 (5th behind Steffi Graf, Martina Navratilova, Chris Evert and Serena Williams).
- In 2015, won three Grand Slam Mixed Doubles title with Leander Paes, an accomplishment last achieved in 1969 by Margaret Court and Marty Riessen
- Most Mixed Doubles titles (2) won by a woman player in Open Era in Australian Open
- Only player in the Open Era to win the Australian Open singles and doubles titles three consecutive years.
  - 1997 (S) d. Pierce, (D) w/Zvereva d. Davenport/Raymond
  - 1998 (S) d. Martinez, (D) w/Lučić d. Davenport/Zvereva
  - 1999 (S) d. Mauresmo, (D) w/Kournikova d. Davenport/Zvereva

=== Notable accolades ===
- Except for the French Open, she won every major WTA Tour singles title at least once during her career (Grand Slam tournaments, WTA Tour Championships, and Tier I tournaments).
- She is the only player to win all nine Tier I (former WTA 1000 Series) active tournaments between 1997 and 2000 in singles, a feat later dubbed as Career Golden Masters in ATP Tour. This career sweep is achieved across hard, clay and indoor courts in a four-year universal cycle and coined as Career Golden Premiers in WTA Tour.
- Except for Berlin, she won every major WTA Tour doubles title at least once during her career (Grand Slam tournaments, WTA Tour Championships, and Tier I tournaments).
- By reaching the 2016 French Open mixed doubles finals, Hingis joined an elite group of players who have reached the finals in all 4 Grand Slams across singles, doubles, and mixed doubles.

== Awards ==
- 1992: Swiss Champion together with the tennisclub TC Schützenwiese (from Winterthur) in the Interclub-Championships.
- 1994: ITF Junior Girls Singles World Champion.
- 1995: WTA Newcomer of the Year.
- 1995: Named "Female Rookie of the Year" by Tennis magazine.
- 1996: WTA Most Improved Player of the Year.
- 1997: Associated Press Female Athlete of the Year.
- 1997: WTA Player of the Year.
- 1997: ITF World Champion – Women's singles.
- 1997: BBC Overseas Sports Personality of the Year.
- 1998: First female athlete to be on the cover of the American men's magazine GQ in June 1998.
- 1998: WTA Doubles Team of the Year (with Jana Novotná).
- 1999: WTA Doubles Team of the Year (with Anna Kournikova).
- 1999: ITF World Champion – Women's Singles.
- 1999: ITF World Champion – Women's doubles (with Anna Kournikova).
- 2000: ITF World Champion – Women's Singles.
- 2000: One of five female tennis players named to the 2000 Forbes magazine Power 100 in Fame and Fortune list at No. 51.
- 2000: WTA Diamond Aces Award.
- 2002: Elected to Tour Players' Council.
- 2006: Laureus World Sports Award for Comeback of the Year.
- 2007: Surpassed US$20 million in career earnings at the Sony Ericsson Open in Key Biscayne, Florida, the fourth female player to do so (after Steffi Graf, Martina Navratilova, and Lindsay Davenport). She was fourth in the all-time money list at $20,033,600 after the tournament.
- 2007: Meredith Inspiration Award for inspiring women around the world – Family Circle Cup/Family Circle magazine
- 2013: Inducted into the International Tennis Hall of Fame on 13 July 2013
- 2015: First Global Ambassador for the International Tennis Hall of Fame.
- 2015: WTA Doubles Team of the Year with Sania Mirza.
- 2015: ITF World Champion – Women's Doubles (with Sania Mirza).
- 2017: WTA Doubles Team of the Year with Chan Yung-jan.
- 2017: ITF World Champion – Women's Doubles (with Chan Yung-jan).

== Equipment endorsements ==
Hingis's current on-court apparel is manufactured by Tonic Lifestyle Apparel; having her own clothing line: Tonic by Martina Hingis. She is sponsored by Yonex for racquets and shoes.

In the 1990s, Hingis was sponsored by Sergio Tacchini. In 1998 she suffered a foot injury, and she withdrew from the Wimbledon doubles competition in 1999. She sued the company in 2001 for making allegedly defective shoes that injured her feet. Hingis and Tacchini settled in 2005 for an undisclosed amount of money. She was sponsored by Adidas from 1999 until 2008.

== See also ==
- WTA Tour records
- List of WTA number 1 ranked singles players
- List of WTA number 1 ranked doubles players
- List of female tennis players
- List of tennis rivalries
- List of Grand Slam women's singles champions
- List of Grand Slam women's doubles champions
- Open Era tennis records – women's singles
- All-time tennis records – women's singles

== Notes ==
Sporting positions
Preceded by Steffi Graf; Lindsay Davenport; Lindsay Davenport; Lindsay Davenport; Lindsay Davenport	World No. 1 March 31, 1997 – October 11, 1998; February 8, 1999 – July 4, 1999; August 9, 1999 – April 2, 2000; May 8, 2000 – May 14, 2000; May 22, 2000 – October 14, 2001	Succeeded by Lindsay Davenport; Lindsay Davenport; Lindsay Davenport; Lindsay Davenport; Jennifer Capriati
Awards and achievements
Preceded by Irina Spîrlea	WTA Newcomer of the Year; 1995	Succeeded by Anna Kournikova
Preceded by Chanda Rubin	WTA Most Improved Player; 1996	Succeeded by Amanda Coetzer
Preceded by Barbara Heeb	Swiss Sportswoman of the Year; 1997	Succeeded by Natascha Badmann
Preceded by Steffi Graf	WTA Player of the Year; 1997	Succeeded by Lindsay Davenport
Preceded by Steffi Graf; Lindsay Davenport	ITF Women's Singles World Champion; 1997; 1999, 2000	Succeeded by Lindsay Davenport; Jennifer Capriati
Preceded by Evander Holyfield; Michael Johnson	BBC Overseas Sports Personality of the Year; 1997	Succeeded by Mark O'Meara
Preceded by Amy Van Dyken	Associated Press Female Athlete of the Year; 1997	Succeeded by Se-ri Pak
Preceded by Fernández & Zvereva; Errani & Vinci	WTA Doubles Team of the Year; 1998 (with Novotná), 1999 (with Kournikova); 2015 (with Mirza)	Succeeded by Williams & Williams; Garcia & Mladenovic
Preceded by Davenport & Zvereva; Errani & Vinci	ITF Women's Doubles World Champion; 1999 (with Kournikova); 2015 (with Mirza)	Succeeded by Williams & Williams; Garcia & Mladenovic
Preceded by Kim Clijsters	WTA Comeback of the Year; 2006	Succeeded by Lindsay Davenport
Preceded by Alessandro Zanardi	Laureus World Comeback of the Year; 2006	Succeeded by Serena Williams
