= 2005 Volvo Women's Open =

- Date: 31 January – 6 February
- Edition: 14th
- Category: Tier IV
- Draw: 32S / 16D
- Prize money: $170,000
- Surface: Hard / outdoor
- Location: Pattaya, Thailand

Champions

Singles
- (Spain) Conchita Martínez

Doubles
- (France) Marion Bartoli (Germany) Anna-Lena Grönefeld
- Volvo Women's Open

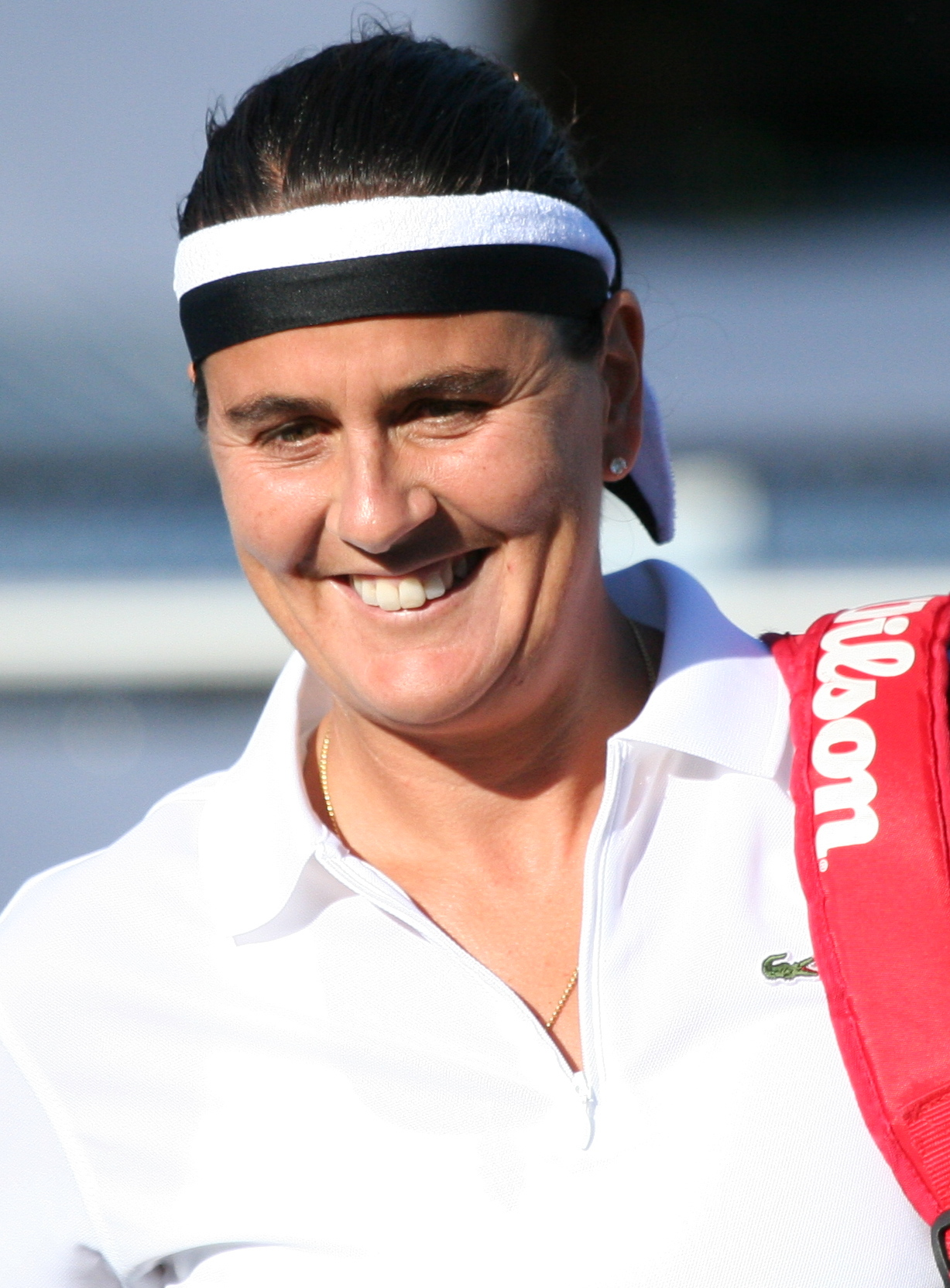

The 2005 Volvo Women's Open was a women's tennis tournament played on outdoor hard courts in Pattaya, Thailand. It was part of Tier IV of the 2005 WTA Tour. It was the 14th edition of the tournament and was held from 31 January through 6 February 2005. Third-seeded Conchita Martínez won the singles title and earned $25,650 first-prize money.

== Finals ==
=== Singles ===
(Spain) Conchita Martínez defeated (Germany) Anna-Lena Grönefeld, 6–3, 3–6, 6–3

- This was Martínez' 1st singles title of the year and the 33rd and last of her career.

=== Doubles ===
(France) Marion Bartoli / (Germany) Anna-Lena Grönefeld defeated (Poland) Marta Domachowska / (Croatia) Silvija Talaja, 6–3, 6–2
