= MGM Cotai =

Casino resort in Macau

Coordinates: 22°8′44″N 113°34′4″E

- 美獅美高梅 (Yue Chinese)

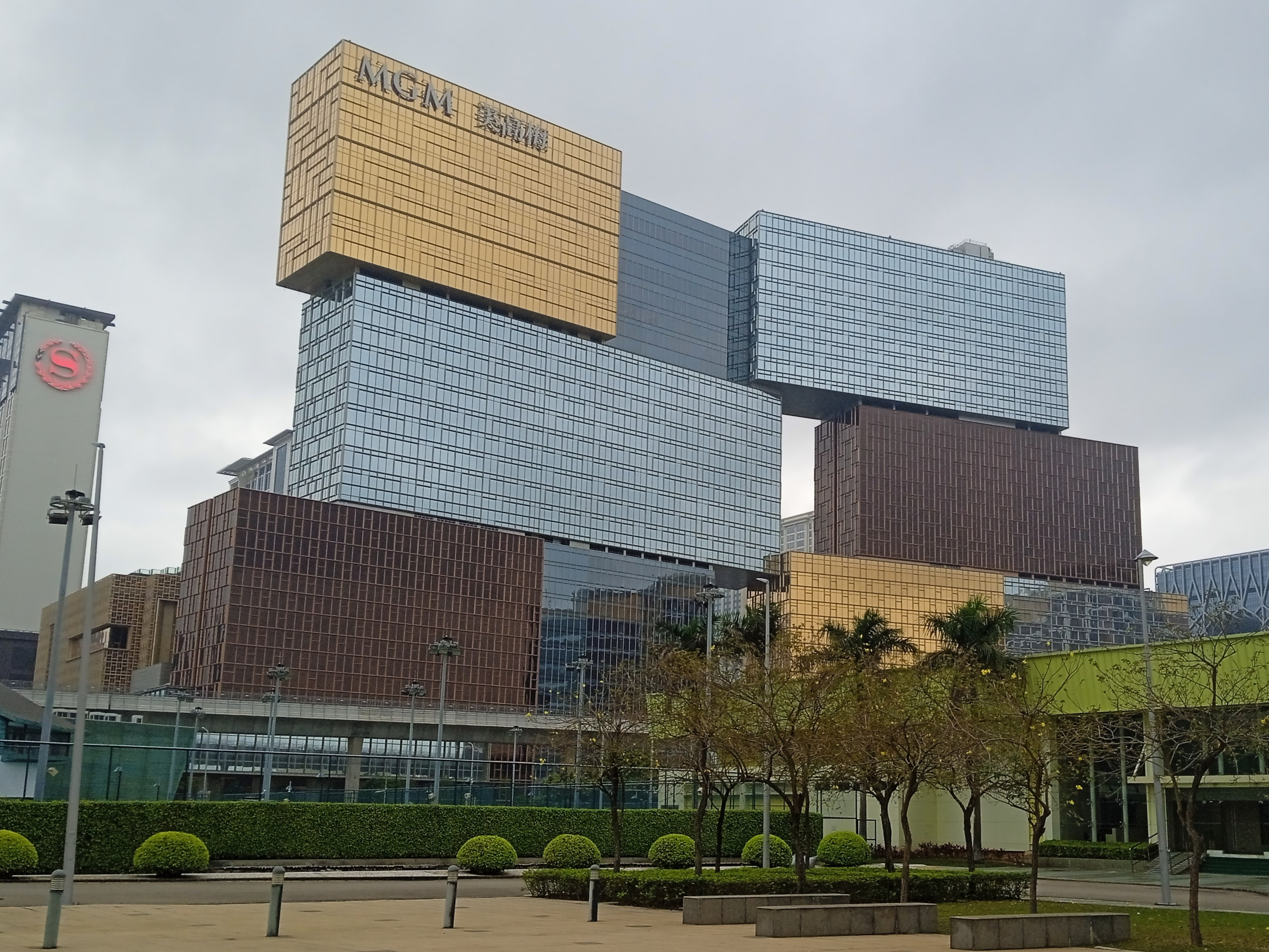
- Exterior of MGM Cotai in 2022
- Interactive map of MGM Cotai
- Location: Cotai, Macau, China
- Opened: February 13, 2018; 8 years ago
- No. of rooms: 1,390
- Casino type: Land-based
- Owner: MGM Resorts International

MGM Cotai is a casino resort in Cotai, Macau, China. Opened on February 13, 2018, it is MGM Resorts International's second property in Macau, after the MGM Macau.

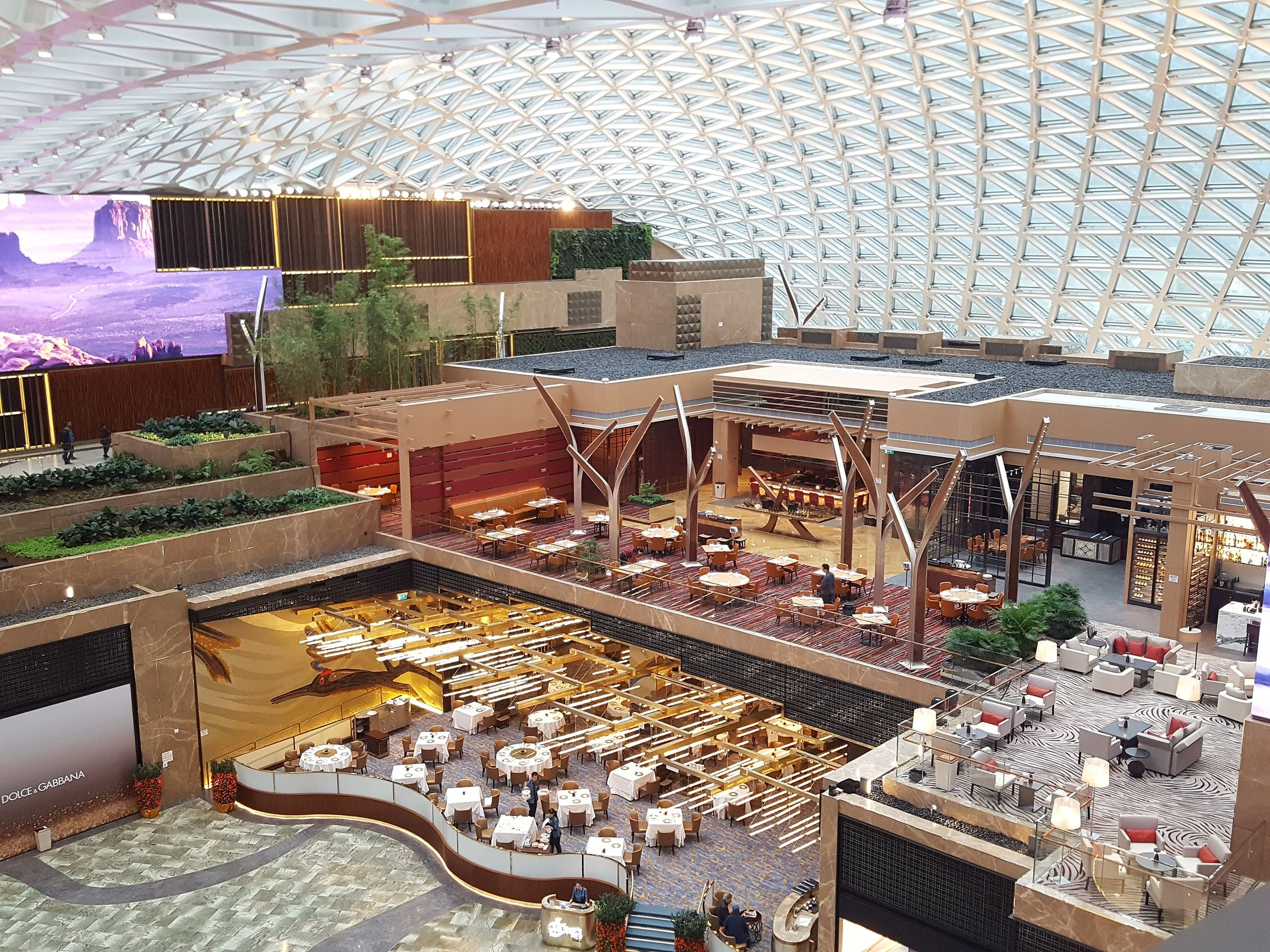
The Spectacle at the MGM Cotai

The hotel consists of 1,400 rooms and suites, a 2000-seat MGM Theater, a casino, meeting spaces, a retail promenade, 5-star spa facilities, retail stores, restaurants, and the awarded Emerald Tower, Emerald Villa, and Skylofts. It also features Nature's Art, an art garden which houses over 100,000 plants and more than 2,000 plant species, including several previously extinct species.

The hotel was featured in Series 3 of Amazing Hotels: Life Beyond the Lobby on BBC television.

== Design and construction ==
Designed by Kohn Pedersen Fox Associates, it was constructed at a cost of US$3.4 billion. The structure has the appearance of nine jewel-like boxes stacked upon each other, forming two interconnected towers. Its exterior is colored gold, silver, and bronze, similar to the MGM Macau. In 2018, the hotel won the Emporis Skyscraper Award. The hotel's atrium, connecting the main lobby to shops and restaurants, named The Spectacle, features the world's largest free-span gridshell glazed roof that is self-supporting. A further 77 tables transferred from MGM Macau have been authorized by the government, bringing the total to 177 gaming tables.

== Opening ==
Initially scheduled in 2016, the opening of MGM Cotai was delayed several times before finally opening on February 13, 2018. However, on opening day, the hotel's VIP accommodations, including The Mansions, were not completed. In addition, out of 1,390 rooms, only 500 rooms were available. The hotel was completed and fully operational later in that same year.

== Future developments ==
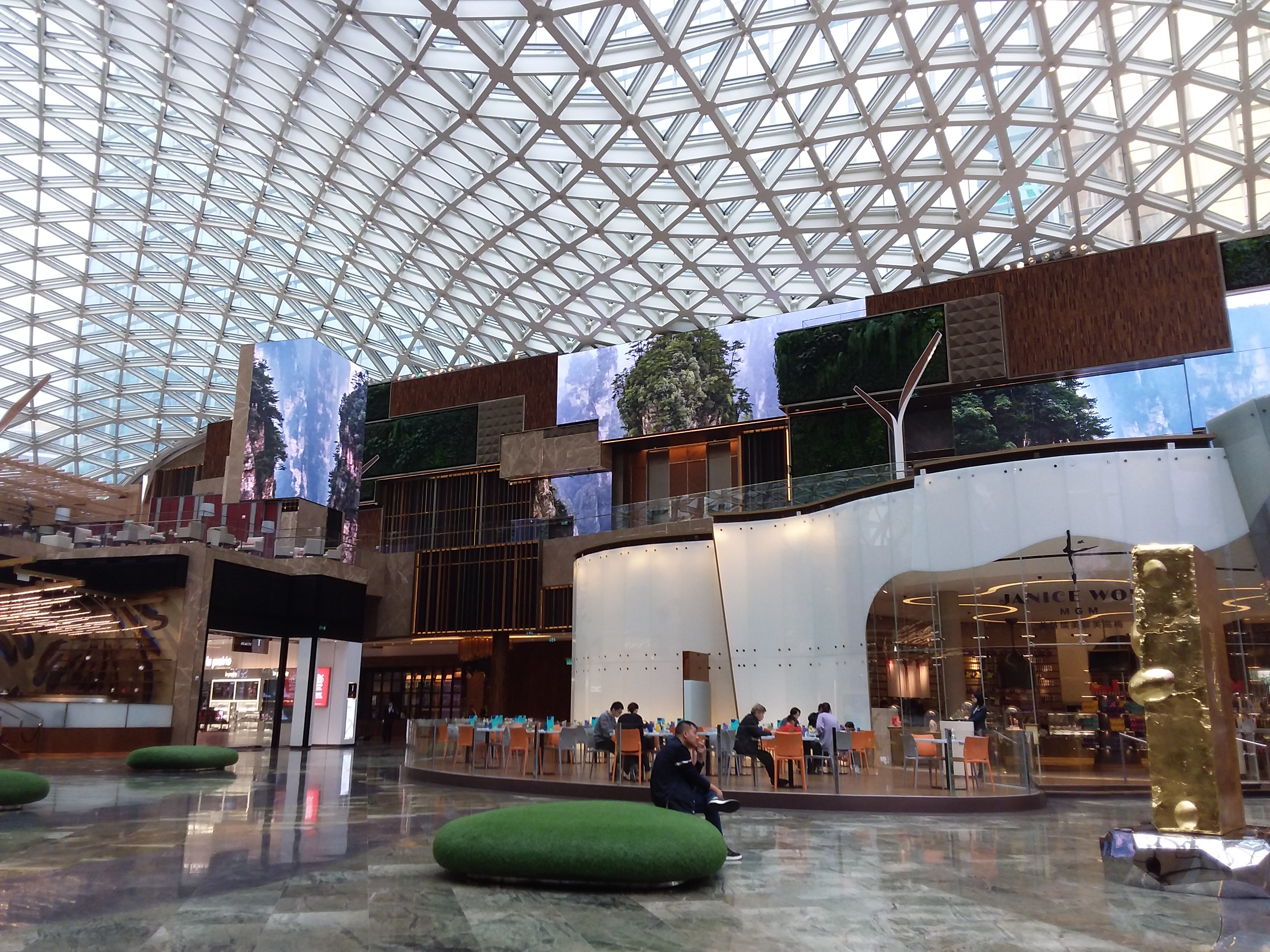
MGM Cotai hotel shopping mall lobby

First mentioned in 2018, an additional south hotel tower housing approximately 1,000 rooms has been planned as part of MGM Cotai's expansion. An expansion of the existing retail podium is also included as part of the plan to allow for more restaurants, retail outlets, and entertainment spots. The foundations for the expansion were pre-built when constructing the resort.

Details of the expansion have not been revealed as of 2019. However, it was announced that the expansion would not be likely before 2021.

== See also ==
- List of integrated resorts
