= 2003 Volvo Women's Open – Singles =

Singles
- 2003 Volvo Women's Open

Final
- Champion: (Slovakia) Henrieta Nagyová
- Runner-up: (Slovakia) Ľubomíra Kurhajcová
- Score: 6–4, 6–2

Details
- Draw: 32
- Seeds: 8

Events
Singles	Doubles
← 2002 ·	Thailand Open	· 2005 →

Angelique Widjaja was the defending champion, but lost to Ľubomíra Kurhajcová in the second round.

Henrieta Nagyová won the title in an all-Slovak final.

== Seeds ==
1. (Thailand) Tamarine Tanasugarn (semifinals)
2. (Japan) Saori Obata (quarterfinals)
3. (Germany) Marlene Weingärtner (withdrew)
4. (Germany) Anca Barna (semifinals)
5. (Slovakia) Ľudmila Cervanová (first round)
6. (Italy) Flavia Pennetta (withdrew)
7. (Croatia) Jelena Kostanić (quarterfinals)
8. (Indonesia) Angelique Widjaja (second round)

== Draw ==
=== Key ===
- Q = Qualifier
- WC = Wild card
- LL = Lucky loser
- Alt = Alternate
- SE = Special exempt
- PR = Protected ranking
- ITF = ITF entry
- JE = Junior exempt
- w/o = Walkover
- r = Retired
- d = Defaulted
- SR = Special ranking

=== Finals ===
Semifinals
1	(Thailand) Tamarine Tanasugarn	2	5
(Slovakia) Henrieta Nagyová	6	7
4	(Germany) Anca Barna	0	0
(Slovakia) Ľubomíra Kurhajcová	6	6

Finals
(Slovakia) Henrieta Nagyová	6	6
(Slovakia) Ľubomíra Kurhajcová	4	2

=== Top half ===
First round
1	(Thailand) T Tanasugarn	3	6	6
Q	(New Zealand) I Gers	6	2	0
(China) T Sun	0	6^{4}
(Czech Republic) S Kleinová	6	7
(Ukraine) Y Fedak	6	6
WC	(Indonesia) W Prakusya	3	1
(Russia) A Rodionova	5	6	6
LL	(Thailand) P Thongdach	7	2	4
LL	(Germany) L Steinbach	7	6
(China) Z Yan	5	1
(Ukraine) E Tatarkova	6	4	6
Q	(Poland) M Domachowska	3	6	0
Q	(Japan) R Fuda	3	1
(Croatia) S Talaja	6	6
(Slovakia) H Nagyová	6	7
5	(Slovakia) Ľ Cervanová	2	6^{5}

Second round
1	(Thailand) T Tanasugarn	6	6
(Czech Republic) S Kleinová	2	1
(Ukraine) Y Fedak	7	6^{2}	3
(Russia) A Rodionova	6^{5}	7	6
LL	(Germany) L Steinbach	4	2
(Ukraine) E Tatarkova	6	6
(Croatia) S Talaja	3	6	1
(Slovakia) H Nagyová	6	4	6

Quarterfinals
1	(Thailand) T Tanasugarn	6	6
(Russia) A Rodionova	2	3
(Ukraine) E Tatarkova	6	0	5
(Slovakia) H Nagyová	3	6	7

Semifinals
1	(Thailand) T Tanasugarn	2	5
(Slovakia) H Nagyová	6	7

=== Bottom half ===
First round
7	(Croatia) J Kostanić	6	6
LL	(Austria) T Schiechtl	3	2
Q	(Ukraine) K Bondarenko	6	7
(China) J Zheng	2	5
(Netherlands) E Tamaëla	7	6
(France) S Beltrame	5	4
LL	(Austria) S Klemenschits	2	6^{7}
4	(Germany) A Barna	6	7
8	(Indonesia) A Widjaja	6	4	6
WC	(Thailand) N Tongsalee	2	6	3
(Slovakia) Ľ Kurhajcová	6	6^{5}	6
(Ukraine) A Bondarenko	3	7	4
(Croatia) I Abramović	6	6
LL	(Japan) M Arai	3	0
(Ukraine) J Vakulenko	4	6	4
2	(Japan) S Obata	6	2	6

Second round
7	(Croatia) J Kostanić	6	6
Q	(Ukraine) K Bondarenko	1	3
(Netherlands) E Tamaëla	4	6^{4}
4	(Germany) A Barna	6	7
8	(Indonesia) A Widjaja	5	1
(Slovakia) Ľ Kurhajcová	7	6
(Croatia) I Abramović	0	3
2	(Japan) S Obata	6	6

Quarterfinals
7	(Croatia) J Kostanić	6	2	2
4	(Germany) A Barna	4	6	6
(Slovakia) Ľ Kurhajcová	6	6
2	(Japan) S Obata	2	4

Semifinals
4	(Germany) A Barna	0	0
(Slovakia) Ľ Kurhajcová	6	6
