= 2005 Volvo Women's Open – Singles =

Singles
- 2005 Volvo Women's Open

Final
- Champion: (Spain) Conchita Martínez
- Runner-up: (Germany) Anna-Lena Grönefeld
- Score: 6–3, 3–6, 6–3

Details
- Draw: 32
- Seeds: 8

Events
Singles	Doubles
← 2003 ·	PTT Pattaya Open	· 2006 →

Conchita Martínez won the title by defeating Anna-Lena Grönefeld in the final in three sets.

Martínez won her first singles title in five years. It was her last singles title before the retirement in 2006, bringing her career total to 33 top-level singles titles.

This tournament marked the return of former world No. 1 Martina Hingis, who lost to Marlene Weingärtner in the first round. It was Hingis' first professional match since October 2002.

== Seeds ==
1. (Russia) Vera Zvonareva (quarterfinals)
2. (France) Marion Bartoli (second round; retired because of an acute stomach illness)
3. (Spain) Conchita Martínez (champion)
4. (United States) Mashona Washington (first round)
5. (Puerto Rico) Kristina Brandi (first round)
6. (Poland) Marta Domachowska (first round)
7. (Germany) Anna-Lena Grönefeld (final)
8. (Spain) Virginia Ruano Pascual (semifinals)

== Draw ==
=== Key ===
- Q = Qualifier
- WC = Wild card
- LL = Lucky loser
- Alt = Alternate
- SE = Special exempt
- PR = Protected ranking
- ITF = ITF entry
- JE = Junior exempt
- w/o = Walkover
- r = Retired
- d = Defaulted
- SR = Special ranking

=== Finals ===
Semifinals
(Russia) Eugenia Linetskaia	2	0^{r}
3	(Spain) Conchita Martínez	6	4
7	(Germany) Anna-Lena Grönefeld	4	6	6
8	(Spain) Virginia Ruano Pascual	6	2	2

Finals
3	(Spain) Conchita Martínez	6	3	6
7	(Germany) Anna-Lena Grönefeld	3	6	3

=== Top half ===
First round
1	(Russia) V Zvonareva	6	6
(Argentina) ME Salerni	1	3
(Germany) A Barna	6	4	7
(Ukraine) T Perebiynis	4	6	5
(Russia) E Linetskaia	2	7	6
(Thailand) T Tanasugarn	6	5	2
(Italy) M Santangelo	6	6
5	(Puerto Rico) K Brandi	1	2
3	(Spain) C Martínez	3	6	6
Q	(India) S Uberoi	6	3	4
Q	(Germany) A Bachmann	2	1
(Croatia) S Talaja	6	6
(Italy) An Serra Zanetti	3	2
Q	(Uzbekistan) A Amanmuradova	6	6
Q	(Israel) S Pe'er	6	6
6	(Poland) M Domachowska	3	2

Second round
1	(Russia) V Zvonareva	6	6
(Germany) A Barna	2	3
(Russia) E Linetskaia	3	6	6
(Italy) M Santangelo	6	2	2
3	(Spain) C Martínez	7	2	7
(Croatia) S Talaja	5	6	5
Q	(Uzbekistan) A Amanmuradova	4	2
Q	(Israel) S Pe'er	6	6

Quarterfinals
1	(Russia) V Zvonareva	4	2
(Russia) E Linetskaia	6	6
3	(Spain) C Martínez	6	6
Q	(Israel) S Pe'er	4	3

Semifinals
(Russia) E Linetskaia	2	0^{r}
3	(Spain) C Martínez	6	4

=== Bottom half ===
First round
7	(Germany) A-L Grönefeld	6	6
(United States) J Hopkins	3	2
(Russia) G Voskoboeva	6	6
(Ukraine) Y Fedak	2	1
(Luxembourg) A Kremer	6^{3}	3
(Serbia and Montenegro) J Dokić	7	6
(Ukraine) A Bondarenko	7	6
4	(United States) M Washington	6^{5}	4
8	(Spain) V Ruano Pascual	6	6
(Israel) T Obziler	3	4
(Germany) M Weingärtner	1	6	6
WC	(Switzerland) M Hingis	6	2	2
(Spain) M Serna	7	7
(Hungary) M Czink	5	5
WC	(Indonesia) A-F Damayanti	3	1
2	(France) M Bartoli	6	6

Second round
7	(Germany) A-L Grönefeld	6	6
(Russia) G Voskoboeva	4	2
(Serbia and Montenegro) J Dokić	6^{1}	0^{r}
(Ukraine) A Bondarenko	7	1
8	(Spain) V Ruano Pascual	1	6	6
(Germany) M Weingärtner	6	1	4
(Spain) M Serna	6	0
2	(France) M Bartoli	4	0^{r}

Quarterfinals
7	(Germany) A-L Grönefeld	6	6
(Ukraine) A Bondarenko	4	1
8	(Spain) V Ruano Pascual	6	6
(Spain) M Serna	2	1

Semifinals
7	(Germany) A-L Grönefeld	4	6	6
8	(Spain) V Ruano Pascual	6	2	2
