= 2003 Volvo Women's Open =

- Date: 3–9 November
- Edition: 13th
- Category: Tier V
- Draw: 32S / 16D
- Prize money: $110,000
- Surface: Hard / outdoor
- Location: Pattaya, Thailand

Champions

Singles
- (Slovakia) Henrieta Nagyová

Doubles
- (China) Li Ting / (China) Sun Tiantian
- Pattaya Women's Open

The 2003 Volvo Women's Open was a women's tennis tournament played on outdoor hard courts in Pattaya, Thailand. It was part of Tier V of the 2003 WTA Tour. It was the 13th edition of the tournament and was held from 3 November through 9 November 2003. Unseeded Henrieta Nagyová won the singles title, her second at the event after 1997, and earned $16,000 first-prize money.

== Finals ==
=== Singles ===
(Slovakia) Henrieta Nagyová defeated (Slovakia) Ľubomíra Kurhajcová, 6–4, 6–2

- This was Nagyová's 1st singles title of the year and the 9th and last of her career.

=== Doubles ===
(China) Li Ting / (China) Sun Tiantian defeated (Indonesia) Wynne Prakusya / (Indonesia) Angelique Widjaja, 6–4, 6–3
