= Grand Resort Bad Ragaz =

Luxurious Resort in Bad Ragaz, Switzerland

Coordinates: 47.00054°N 9.50383°E

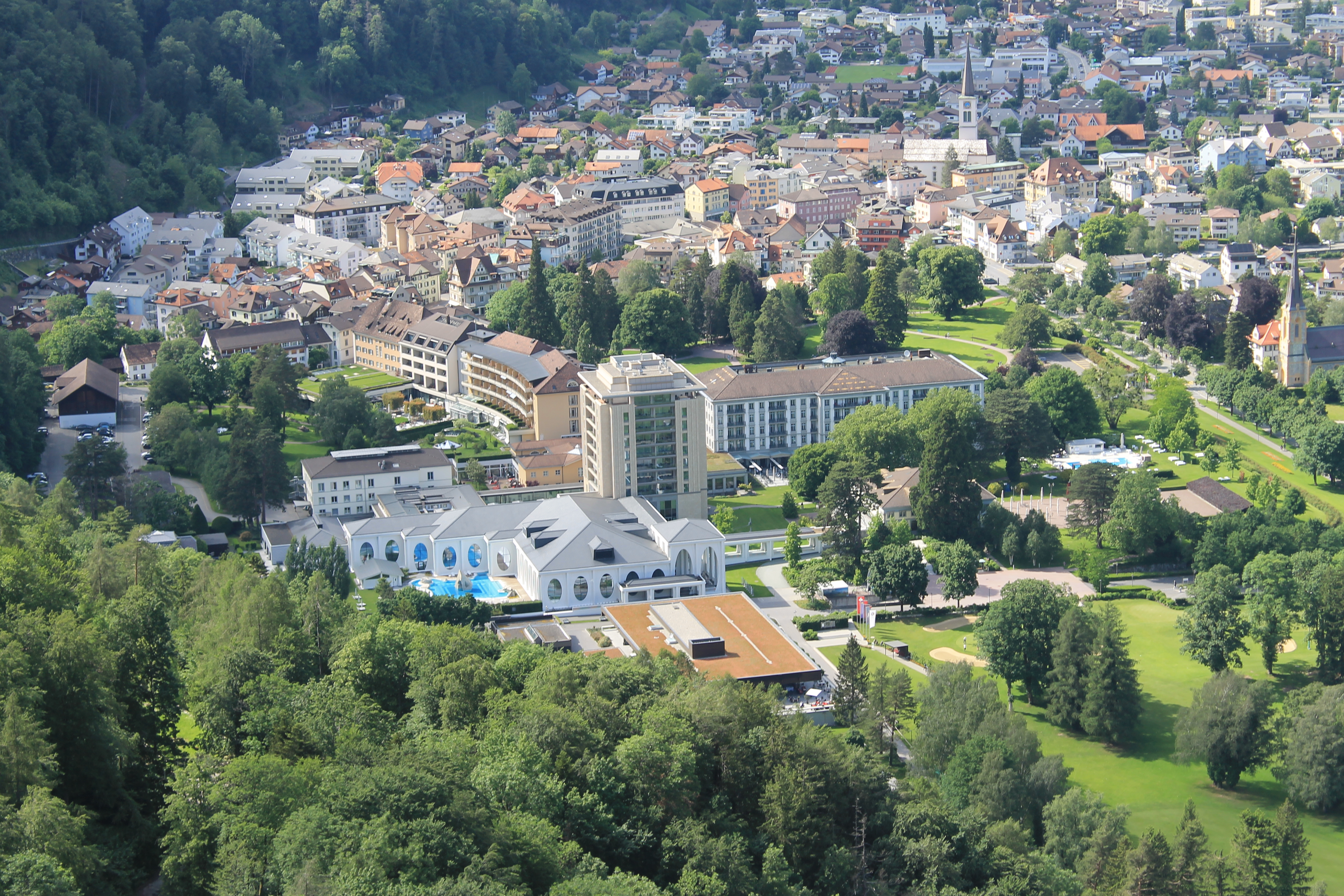
Grand Resort Bad Ragaz Ansicht Wartenstein

The Grand Resort Bad Ragaz is a historic wellness hotel with its own thermal spring and medical centre located in Bad Ragaz in Eastern Switzerland.

== History ==
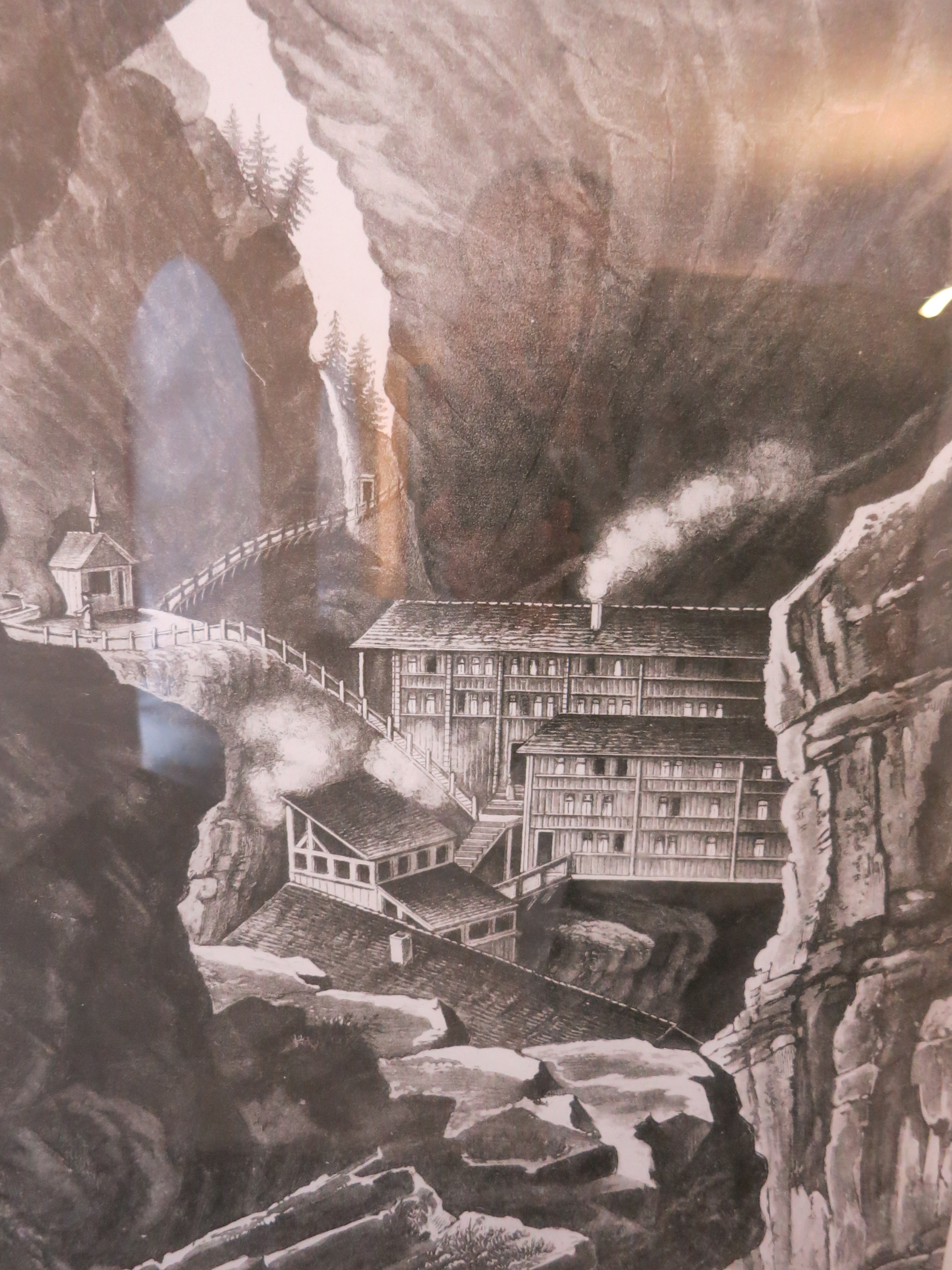
Old Pfäfers bath

In 1242, hunters from the Pfäfers Abbey discovered a 36.5 °C warm spring in the Tamina Gorge. The monks of the nearby Benedictine monastery recognized a healing effect in its water, according to tradition.

The history of Bad Ragaz as a bathing and health resort begins after the Pfäfers Abbey was abolished (1838) with the construction of the road through the Taminatobel to Bad Pfäfers (1839), the outflow of the warm thermal water to Bad Ragaz (1840) and the construction of the first Health resorts (Hotel "Hof Ragaz") in the premises of the former Pfäfers governorate. This development was assisted by the connection to the St. Gallen-Chur railway line (1858). In 1868 the Glarner architect Bernhard Simon acquired the former Pfäfers monastery domain in Bad Ragaz from the canton, founded the Ragaz-Pfäfers spa and built new spa facilities (including the Grand Hotel "Quellenhof"). The infrastructure in the village was adapted to the needs of spa and bathing guests. Hotels and guest houses for the middle class, restaurants, shops and businesses emerged. Numerous Russian nobles came to the spa for several months at a time.

== Thermal springs ==
The Tamina Thermal bath was established in 1872, and was the first indoor thermal water pool in Europe. The thermal bath is fed with the 36.5 °C thermal water from the nearby Tamina Gorge and consists of the historic Helena pool, a sports pool, a garden pool, a family spa and a sauna area. The water was used in Bad Pfäfers from 1350 to 1969, in the Valens healing clinic and in the thermal baths of Bad Ragaz. The water is used to allegedly treat circulatory diseases, rheumatism, symptoms of paralysis and the results from accidents.

== Resort ==
The resort consists of the Grand Hotel Hof Ragaz and the Grand Hotel Quellenhof & Spa Suites. The resort includes several restaurants. and a public thermal bath, and spa.

=== Lodging facilities ===
Lodging facilities include the Grand Hotel Quellenhof & Spa Suites. Bernhard Simon was granted the concession to operate a hotel in 1868. It was opened on 10 July 1869. The Grand Hotel Hof Ragaz is a five-star hotel in Bad Ragaz. The Hotel-Restaurant Schloss Wartenstein in Pfäfers is located 250 m above Bad Ragaz at the entrance to the Tamina Valley on a rocky outcrop and has been part of the Grand Resort Bad Ragaz since February 2016. There are a total of 10 rooms and 222 seats in the restaurant.

=== Gallery ===
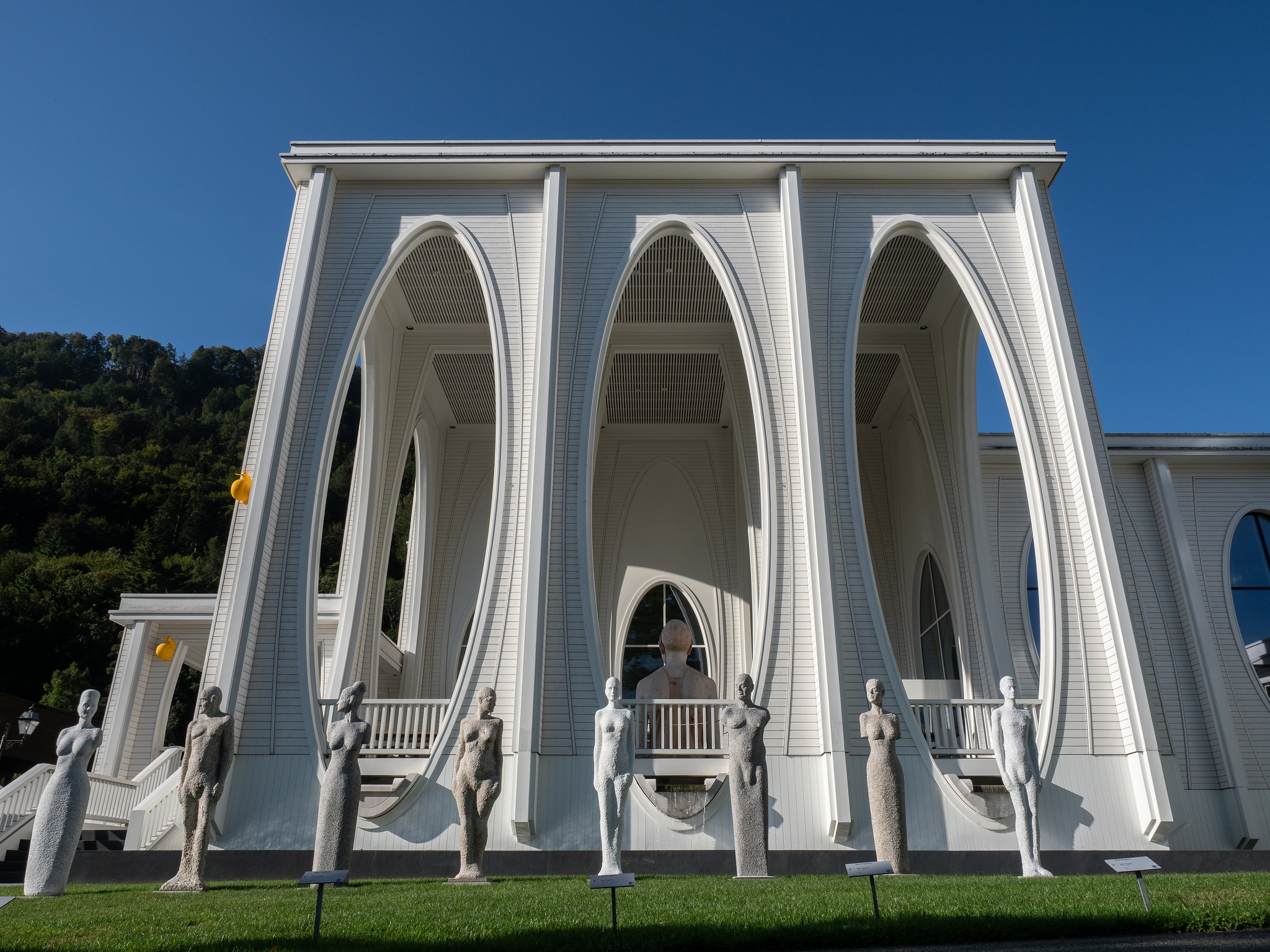
Tamina thermal bath

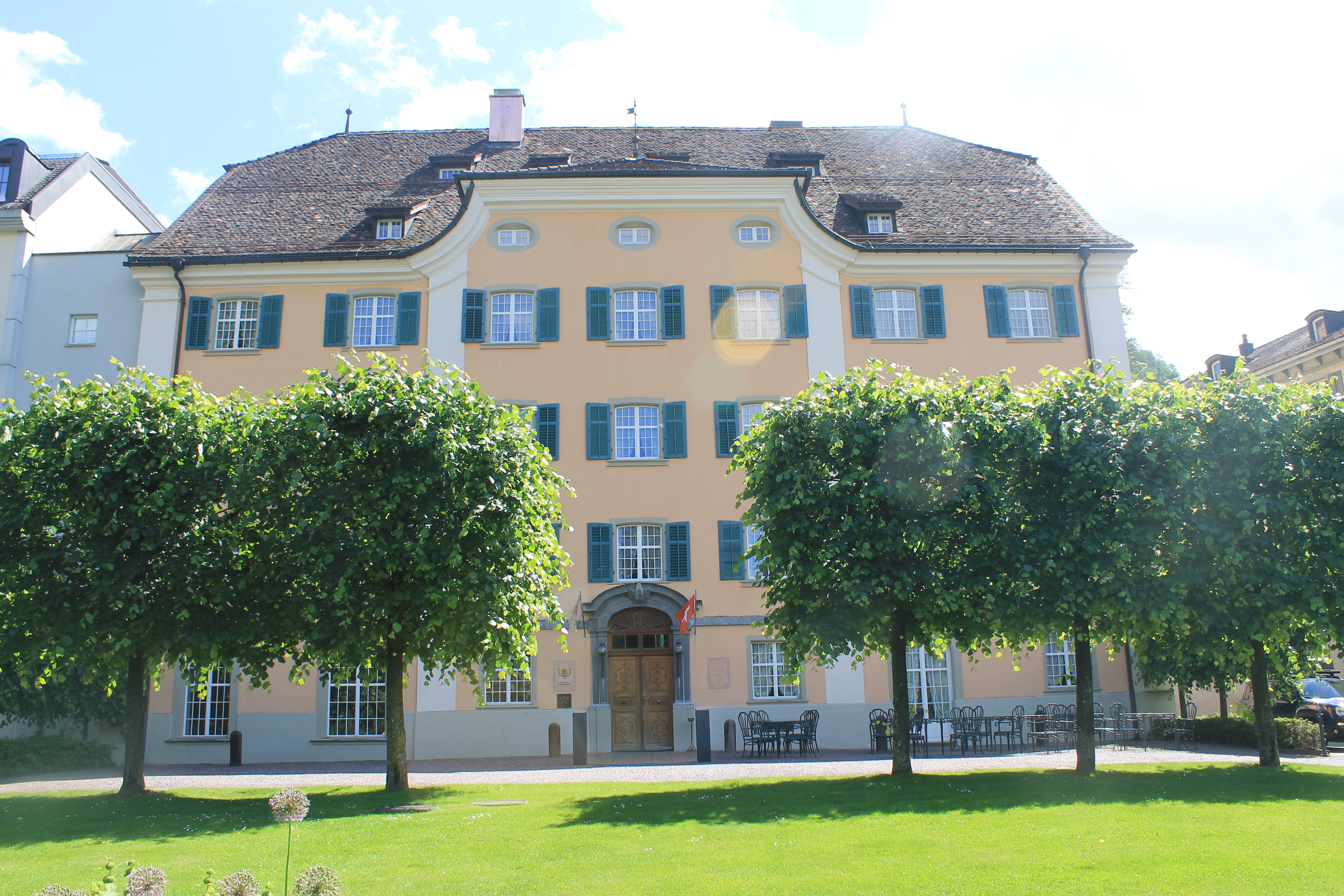
The old administrative building of the monastery in Ragaz. The first hotel was built from it in 1840.

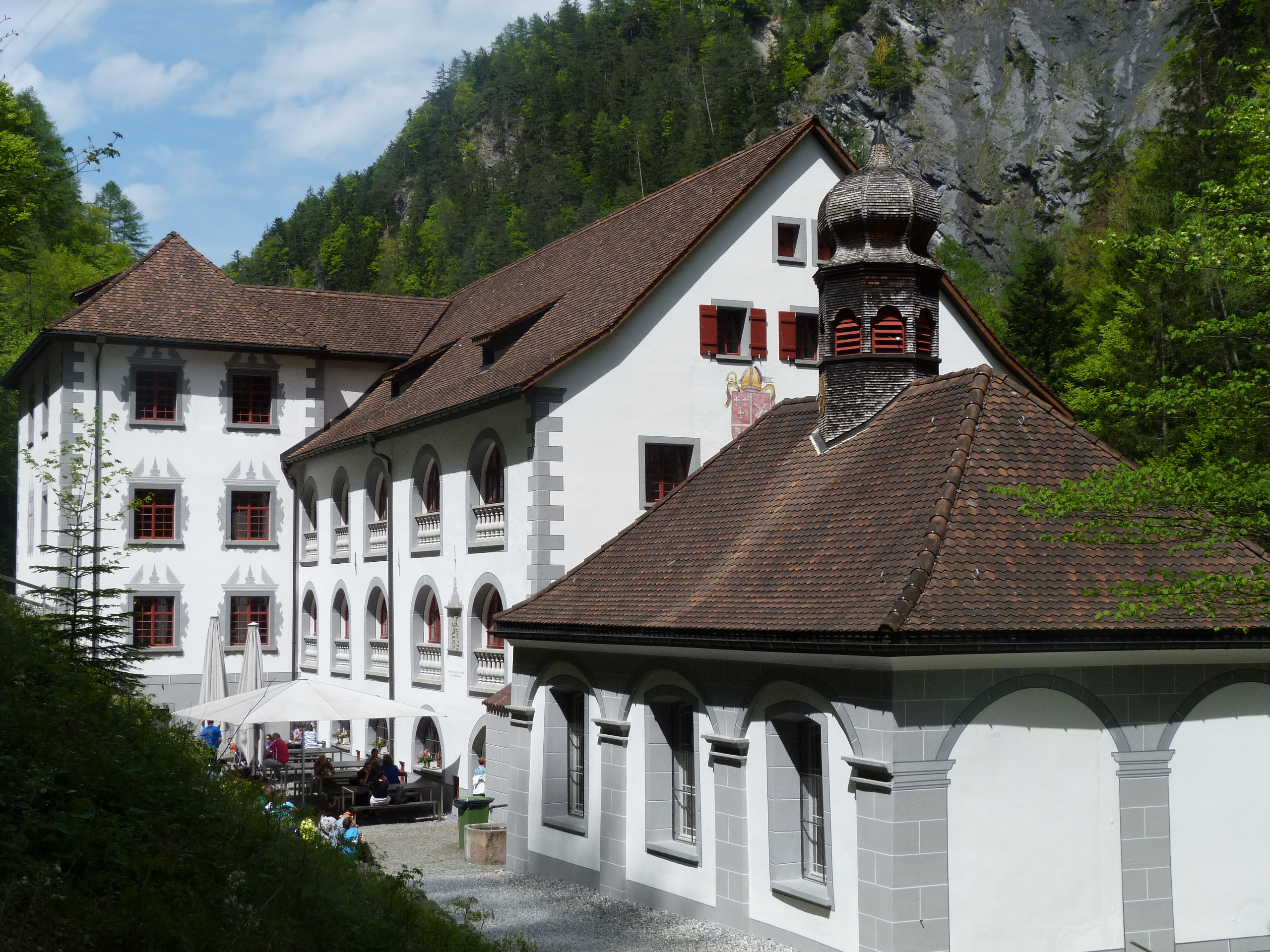
Before the construction of the water pipeline to Ragaz in 1840, the baths were located in the Tamina Gorge.

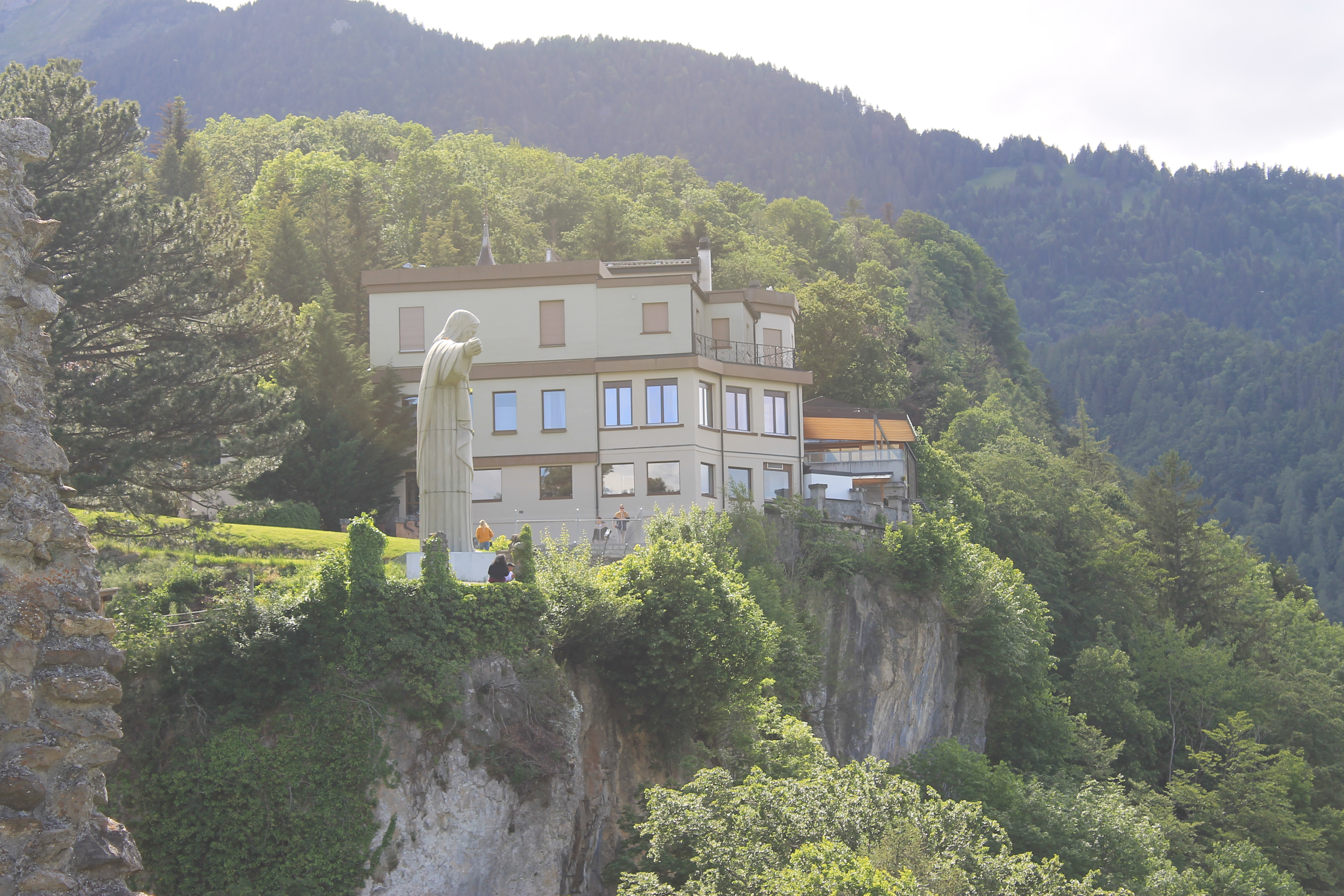
Hotel Wartenstein Castle with Jesus statue. View from the ruins of Wartenstein Castle.

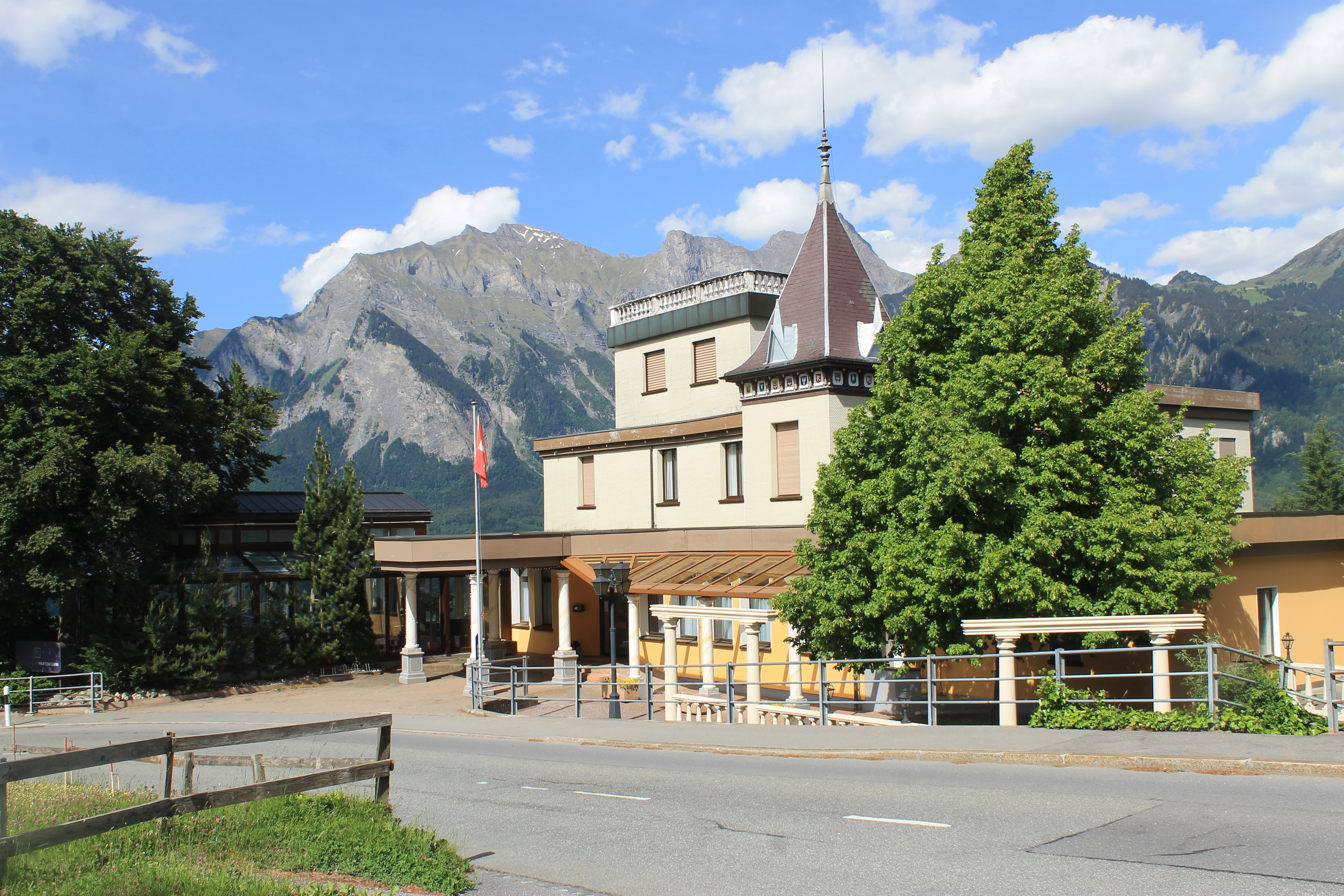
Hotel Wartenstein Castle main entrance. Owned by the resort since 2016.
