= WTA Finals appearances =

This list shows the appearances of all participants in the women's tennis WTA Finals singles since their inception as the Virginia Slims Championships in 1972. The tournament is currently held in King Saud University Indoor Arena in Riyadh, Saudi Arabia.

== Qualification ==
Eight players to compete. To qualify, players/teams have to play a minimum of eight WTA 1000 or WTA 500 tournaments during the season. Players/teams are qualified in the following sequence:

1. Ranked top seven in the leaderboard;
2. The highest-ranked current-year Grand Slam winning player/team ranked from eighth to twentieth;
3. The second-highest-ranked current-year Grand Slam winning player/team ranked from eighth to twentieth, if one player/team ranked in the top seven withdraws;
4. The next player who is ranked eighth or below.

In the singles, point totals are calculated by combining point totals from eighteen tournaments (excluding ITF and WTA 125 tournaments). Of these eighteen tournaments, a player's results from the following events are included:

- The four Grand Slam events;
- Six best mandatory WTA 1000 tournaments from the following seven events: Indian Wells, Miami, Madrid, Rome, Toronto/Montreal, Cincinnati and Beijing;
- The best mandatory WTA 1000 tournament from the following three events: Doha, Dubai and Wuhan;
- (for the players who played the main draw of least two such tournaments) the best seven results from any other mandatory WTA 1000, WTA 500 and WTA 250 tournaments.

=== Format ===
Unlike other events on the WTA Tour, the WTA Finals is not a straightforward single-elimination tournament. The eight players are divided into two groups of four and each play three round-robin matches against the others in their group. After the round-robin stage, the top two performers in each group advance to the semifinals in a knock-out stage. The two winners of the semifinals play a final to determine the champion. In this format, it is theoretically possible to advance to the semifinals with two round-robin losses, but no player in the history of the singles tournament has won the title after losing more than one round-robin match.

To create the groups, the eight players are seeded according to rank. The first and second seeds are placed in Group A and Group B, respectively. The remaining seeds are drawn in pairs (third and fourth, fifth and sixth, seventh and eighth); the first of the pair to be drawn goes to Group A and the other to Group B, and so on.

The format described above has been in place in 1977–1978 and from 2003 to present:

- 1972, 1974, 1983–2002: 16-player four-round single-elimination tournament (no round robin), no byes.
- 1973: 8-player three-round single-elimination tournament (no round robin), no byes.
- 1975–76: 16-player one-round single-elimination tournament, the 8 winners advanced to round robin groups.
- 1979–82: 8-player round robin groups with playoff round.

Key

Current format

- W = winner;
- F = runner-up;
- SF = lost in semi-finals (1972–present);
- RR = lost in Round Robin group stage (1975–1982, 2003–present);
- A+ = Alternate (played from the beginning = qualified player withdrew before the tournament);
- A− = Alternate (did not play from the beginning; 2003–present);
- R = withdrew during the tournament (2003–present).

Older format

- QF/PO = lost in quarter-finals or playoff round (1979–1982);
- R16/QPO = lost in 1st round/Round of 16 (1972, 1974, 1983–2002) or qualifying playoff (1975–1976);
- 3rd–8th = position playoffs played (1975–1978);

Note

When there are more players listed for any year, it is usually due to withdrawal by one or more players because of injury. When a player withdraws early in the tournament, his place is filled by the next-highest qualifier.

Participants are listed in order of number of appearances. When there are more than eight players listed for any year since 2003, it is usually due to withdrawal by one or more players because of injury. When a player withdraws early in the tournament, her place is filled by the next-highest qualifier.

Participants are listed in order of (1) number of appearances, (2) best result(s) (bolded years for wins, underlined years for other best results), (3) year of first appearance, and (4) alphabetical order if still tied. Active players are indicated in bold.

Player	#	Best result	Years Year(s) of best result underlined (Wins in bold)	Qualified but not played	W–L
(Czechoslovakia) / (United States) Martina Navratilova	21	**W**	1974, 1975, 1976, 1977, **1978**, **1979**, 1980, **1981**, 1982, **1983**, **1984**, **1985**, **1986** (Mar), **1986** (Nov), 1987, 1988, 1989, 1991, 1992, 1993, 1994	1990	60–13
(Germany) Steffi Graf	13	**W**	1986 (Mar), 1986 (Nov), **1987**, 1988, **1989**, 1990, 1991, 1992, **1993**, 1994, **1995**, **1996**, 1998	1999	33–8
(United States) Chris Evert	13	**W**	**1972**, **1973**, 1974, **1975**, 1976, **1977**, 1979, 1983, 1984, 1985, 1986 (Mar), 1987, 1988	1978	33–9
(Spain) Arantxa Sánchez Vicario	13	F	1989, 1990, 1991, 1992, 1993, 1994, 1995, 1996, 1997, 1998, 1999, 2000, 2001	–	11–13
(United States) Zina Garrison	12	QF	1983, 1984, 1985, 1986 (Mar), 1986 (Nov), 1987, 1988, 1989, 1990, 1991, 1992, 1993	–	2–12
(Spain) Conchita Martínez	12	QF	1989, 1990, 1991, 1992, 1993, 1994, 1995, 1996, 1997, 1998, 1999, 2000	–	7–12
(Argentina) Gabriela Sabatini	11	**W**	1986 (Mar), 1986 (Nov), 1987, **1988**, 1989, 1990, 1991, 1992, 1993, **1994**, 1995	–	21–9
(United States) Lindsay Davenport	11	**W**	1994, 1995, 1996, 1997, 1998, **1999**, 2000, 2001, 2002, 2004, 2005	2003	18–9
(Czech Republic) Helena Suková	11	F	1984, 1985, 1986 (Mar), 1986 (Nov), 1987, 1988, 1989, 1990, 1991, 1992, 1993	–	11–11
(Czech Republic) Jana Novotná	10	**W**	1989, 1990, 1991, 1992, 1993, 1994, 1995, 1996, **1997**, 1998	–	11–9
(Bulgaria) / (Switzerland) Manuela Maleeva	10	SF	1985, 1986 (Mar), 1986 (Nov), 1987, 1988, 1989, 1990, 1991, 1992, 1993	–	6–10
(Russia) Elena Dementieva	10	SF	2000, 2001, 2002, 2003, 2004, 2005, 2006, 2008, 2009, 2010	–	7–20
(United States) Serena Williams	9	**W**	**2001**, 2002, 2004, 2007(R), 2008(R), **2009**, **2012**, **2013**, **2014**	1999, 2000, 2003, 2010, 2015, 2016	29–6
(Socialist Federal Republic of Yugoslavia) / (Federal Republic of Yugoslavia) / (United States) Monica Seles	9	**W**	1989, **1990**, **1991**, **1992**, 1996, 1997, 1998, 2000, 2002	1993, 1995, 1999, 2001	18–6
(France) Nathalie Tauziat	9	SF	1990, 1991, 1992, 1993, 1997, 1998, 1999, 2000, 2001	–	6–9
(South Africa) Amanda Coetzer	9	QF	1993, 1994, 1995, 1996, 1997, 1998, 1999, 2000, 2001	–	2–9
(Russia) Maria Sharapova	8	**W**	**2004**, 2005, 2006, 2007, 2011(R), 2012, 2014, 2015	2013	21–11
(Poland) Agnieszka Radwańska	8	**W**	2008(A−), 2009(A−), 2011, 2012, 2013, 2014, **2015**, 2016	–	11–14
(Czech Republic) / (Australia) Hana Mandlíková	8	F	1981, 1983, 1984, 1985, 1986 (Mar), 1986 (Nov), 1987, 1989	–	8–9
(United States) Pam Shriver	8	F	1981, 1983, 1984, 1985, 1986 (Mar), 1986 (Nov), 1987, 1988	–	11–9
(United Kingdom) Virginia Wade	8	3rd	1973, 1974, 1975, 1976, 1977, 1978, 1979, 1980	–	10–14
(Australia) Wendy Turnbull	8	3rd	1978, 1979, 1980, 1982, 1983, 1984, 1985, 1986 (Mar)	–	7–11
(Germany) Sylvia Hanika	7	**W**	1981, **1982**, 1983, 1984, 1985, 1987, 1988	–	10–7
(Belgium) Kim Clijsters	7	**W**	2000, 2001, **2002**, **2003**, 2005, 2006, **2010**	–	19–7
(Czech Republic) Petra Kvitová	7	**W**	**2011**, 2012(R), 2013, 2014, 2015, 2018, 2019	–	10–14
(Germany) Anke Huber	7	F	1993, 1994, 1995, 1996, 1997, 1999, 2001	2000	6–7
(France) Mary Pierce	7	F	1993, 1994, 1995, 1997, 1998, 1999, 2005	2000	13–7
(United States) Mary Joe Fernández	7	SF	1989, 1990, 1991, 1992, 1993, 1995, 1997	1994	5–7
(United States) Jennifer Capriati	7	SF	1990, 1991, 1992, 2000, 2001, 2002, 2003	1993	7–8
(Australia) Evonne Goolagong	6	**W**	**1974**, 1975, **1976**, 1978, 1980, 1983	1973	17–5
(Switzerland) Martina Hingis	6	**W**	1996, 1997, **1998**, 1999, **2000**, 2006	2001, 2002	17–5
(France) Amélie Mauresmo	6	**W**	1999, 2001, 2003, 2004, **2005**, 2006	2000, 2002	12–9
(Denmark) Caroline Wozniacki	6	**W**	2009(R), 2010, 2011, 2014, **2017**, 2018	–	14–10
(Belarus) **Aryna Sabalenka**	6	F	2021, 2022^{†}, 2023^{†}, 2024^{†}, 2025^{†}, 2026^{†}	–	13–11
(United States) Barbara Potter	6	SF	1981, 1982, 1983, 1984, 1986 (Mar), 1988	–	3–8
(Soviet Union) / (Belarus) / (Belarus) Natasha Zvereva	6	SF	1988, 1990, 1993, 1994, 1995, 1998	–	3–6
(Russia) Svetlana Kuznetsova	6	SF	2004, 2006, 2007, 2008, 2009, 2016	–	5–14
(United States) **Venus Williams**	5	**W**	1999, 2002, **2008**, 2009, 2017	2000, 2001, 2003, 2007, 2010	14–7
(Belgium) Justine Henin	5	**W**	2001, 2002, 2003, **2006**, **2007**	2004, 2005	13–5
(Poland) **Iga Świątek**	5	**W**	2021, 2022, **2023**, 2024, 2025	–	12–6
(United States) **Coco Gauff**	5	**W**	2022, 2023, **2024**, 2025, 2026	–	9–9
(Russia) Vera Zvonareva	5	F	2004, 2008, 2009(A−) (R), 2010, 2011	–	8–9
(Belarus) **Victoria Azarenka**	5	F	2009(R), 2010, 2011, 2012, 2013	–	8–10
(Germany) Angelique Kerber	5	F	2012, 2013, 2015, 2016, 2018	–	7–10
(Romania) Simona Halep	5	F	2014, 2015, 2016, 2017, 2019	2018	7–10
(United States) **Jessica Pegula**	5	F	2022, 2023, 2024(R), 2025, 2026	–	8–10
(United States) Rosie Casals	5	3rd	1972, 1974, 1976, 1977, 1978	–	9–7
(France) Françoise Dürr	5	SF	1972, 1973, 1974, 1975, 1976	–	4–8
(United States) Billie Jean King	5	SF	1972, 1974, 1978, 1980, 1983	1973	8–8
(Germany) Bettina Bunge	5	SF	1981, 1982, 1983, 1986 (Nov), 1987	–	4–7
(United States) Lori McNeil	5	SF	1986 (Nov), 1987, 1988, 1991, 1992	–	2–5
(Federal Republic of Yugoslavia) / (Serbia and Montenegro) / (Serbia) Jelena Janković	5	SF	2007, 2008, 2009, 2010, 2013	–	5–13
(Czech Republic) **Karolína Plíšková**	5	SF	2016, 2017, 2018, 2019, 2021	–	9–9
(Netherlands) Betty Stöve	5	QF	1972, 1974, 1976, 1977, 1978	–	3–7
(Germany) Claudia Kohde-Kilsch	5	QF	1985, 1986 (Mar), 1986 (Nov), 1987, 1988	–	2–5
(Bulgaria) Katerina Maleeva	5	QF	1987, 1988, 1990, 1991, 1992	–	1–5
(Spain) Garbiñe Muguruza	4	**W**	2015, 2016, 2017, **2021**	–	9–6
(Ukraine) **Elina Svitolina**	4	**W**	2017, **2018**, 2019, 2026	–	13–5
(United States) Kathy Rinaldi	4	SF	1983, 1985, 1986 (Mar), 1986 (Nov)	–	2–4
(Netherlands) Brenda Schultz-McCarthy	4	SF	1994, 1995, 1996, 1997	–	3–4
(Socialist Federal Republic of Yugoslavia) / (Croatia) Iva Majoli	4	SF	1994, 1995, 1996, 1997	–	3–4
(France) Sandrine Testud	4	SF	1998, 1999, 2000, 2001	–	2–4
(United States) Julie Heldman	4	QF	1972, 1973, 1974, 1975	–	2–6
(United States) Kathy Jordan	4	QF	1980, 1982, 1984, 1985	–	3–6
(Sweden) Catarina Lindqvist	4	QF	1985, 1986 (Nov), 1987, 1989	–	1–4
(France) Julie Halard-Decugis	4	QF	1991, 1994, 1999, 2000	–	1–4
(Bulgaria) Magdalena Maleeva	4	QF	1993, 1995, 2001, 2002	1994	1–4
(United States) Chanda Rubin	4	R16/RR	1995, 2000, 2002, 2003	–	1–5
(United States) Tracy Austin	3	**W**	1979, **1980**, 1983	–	8–2
(Kazakhstan) **Elena Rybakina**	3	**W**	2023, 2024, **2025**	2026	7–4
(United States) Nancy Richey	3	F	1972, 1973, 1975	–	2–3
(Australia) Kerry Melville	3	F	1972, 1973, 1978	–	4–5
(United Kingdom) Sue Barker	3	F	1976, 1977, 1979	–	8–5
(United States) Andrea Jaeger	3	F	1981, 1983, 1984	–	3–3
(China) Li Na	3	F	2011, 2012, 2013	–	6–5
(Japan) Kimiko Date	3	SF	1994, 1995, 1996	–	4–3
(Romania) Irina Spîrlea	3	SF	1996, 1997, 1998	–	4–3
(Russia) Anna Kournikova	3	SF	1998, 1999, 2000	–	2–3
(Russia) Anastasia Myskina	3	SF	2002, 2003, 2004	–	3–5
(Serbia and Montenegro) / (Serbia) Ana Ivanovic	3	SF	2007, 2008(R), 2014	–	4–5
(Australia) Samantha Stosur	3	SF	2010, 2011, 2012(A−)	–	4–6
(Greece) **Maria Sakkari**	3	SF	2021, 2022, 2023	–	5–6
(Australia) Lesley Hunt	3	QF	1972, 1974, 1976	–	1–3
(Socialist Federal Republic of Yugoslavia) Mima Jaušovec	3	PO	1976, 1977, 1982	–	1–6
(Canada) Carling Bassett-Seguso	3	QF	1984, 1985, 1986 (Mar)	–	1–3
(Italy) Raffaella Reggi	3	QF	1986 (Nov), 1987, 1989	–	1–3
(Switzerland) Patty Schnyder	3	R16/RR	1998, 2002, 2005	–	1–4
(Russia) Nadia Petrova	3	RR	2005, 2006, 2008(A−)	–	2–5
(France) Caroline Garcia	2	**W**	2017, **2022**	–	6–3
(Netherlands) Kiki Bertens	2	SF	2018, 2019(A−) (R)	–	3–3
(Czech Republic) **Barbora Krejčíková**	2	SF	2021, 2024	–	2–5
(Australia) Karen Krantzcke	2	QF	1972, 1974	–	1–2
(United States) Wendy Overton	2	QF	1972, 1975	–	1–2
(United States) Janet Newberry	2	QF	1973, 1975	–	0–2
(United States) Anne Guerrant	2	QF	1973, 1975	–	2–4
(United States) Bonnie Gadusek	2	QF	1983, 1986 (Mar)	–	1–2
(Belgium) Dominique Monami	2	QF	1998, 1999	–	2–2
(Federal Republic of Yugoslavia) Jelena Dokic	2	QF	2001, 2002	–	2–2
(Soviet Union) Olga Morozova	2	5th	1975, 1976	–	3–4
(United States) Marcie Louie	2	8th	1974, 1975	–	1–5
(United States) Valerie Ziegenfuss	2	R16	1972, 1974	–	0–2
(United States) Kathy Kuykendall	2	R16	1974, 1975	–	0–2
(South Africa) Greer Stevens	2	RR	1979, 1980	–	0–4
(Romania) Virginia Ruzici	2	R16	1983, 1984	–	0–2
(Hungary) Andrea Temesvári	2	R16	1984, 1985	–	0–2
(United States) Terry Phelps	2	R16	1986 (Mar), 1986 (Nov)	–	0–2
(Canada) Helen Kelesi	2	R16	1988, 1989	–	0–2
(Austria) Barbara Paulus	2	R16	1990, 1996	–	0–2
(Austria) Judith Wiesner	2	R16	1990, 1996	–	0–2
(United States) Amy Frazier	2	R16	1992, 2000	–	0–2
(Russia) Elena Likhovtseva	2	R16	1999(A+), 2000	–	0–2
(Italy) Silvia Farina Elia	2	R16	2001, 2002	–	0–2
(Slovakia) Daniela Hantuchová	2	R16/RR	2002, 2007	–	1–3
(France) Marion Bartoli	2	RR	2007(A−), 2011(A−)	–	2–1
(Russia) Dinara Safina	2	RR	2008, 2009(R)	–	0–4
(Italy) **Sara Errani**	2	RR	2012, 2013	–	2–4
(United States) **Madison Keys**	2	RR	2016, 2025(R)	–	1–4
(Japan) **Naomi Osaka**	2	RR	2018, 2019(R)	–	1–3
(Tunisia) **Ons Jabeur**	2	RR	2022, 2023	–	2–4
(Russia) / (Australia) **Daria Kasatkina**	2	RR	2022, 2024(A−)	–	1–3
(Italy) **Jasmine Paolini**	2	RR	2024, 2025	–	1–5
(Slovakia) Dominika Cibulková	1	**W**	**2016**	–	3–2
(Australia) Ashleigh Barty	1	**W**	**2019**	2021	4–1
**Mirra Andreeva**	1	**W**	**2026**^{†}	–	5–0
(United States) **Sloane Stephens**	1	F	2018	–	4–1
(Estonia) Anett Kontaveit	1	F	2021	–	3–2
(China) **Zheng Qinwen**	1	F	2024	–	3–2
(Australia) Dianne Fromholtz	1	SF	1979	–	2–2
(United States) Anne Smith	1	SF	1982	–	2–2
(Russia) Anna Chakvetadze	1	SF	2007	–	2–2
(Switzerland) **Belinda Bencic**	1	SF	2019(R)	–	2–2
(Spain) **Paula Badosa**	1	SF	2021	–	2–2
(United States) **Amanda Anisimova**	1	SF	2025	–	2–2
(Czech Republic) **Linda Nosková**	1	SF	2026	–	2–2
(United States) Marita Redondo	1	5th	1976	–	2–3
(United States) Jeanne Evert	1	QF	1972	–	1–1
(Australia) Helen Gourlay	1	QF	1974	–	1–1
(United States) Leslie Allen	1	PO	1981	–	1–2
(United States) Kathleen Horvath	1	QF	1984	–	1–1
(Austria) Barbara Schett	1	QF	1999	–	1–1
(Australia) Margaret Court	1	R16	1972	1973	0–1
(Australia) Wendy Gilchrist	1	R16	1972	–	0–1
(United States) Laurie Rowley	1	R16	1972	–	0–1
(United States) Pam Teeguarden	1	R16	1974	–	0–1
(Argentina) Raquel Giscafré	1	QPO	1975	–	0–1
(United States) Sue Stap	1	QPO	1975	–	0–1
(Soviet Union) Natasha Chmyreva	1	QPO	1976	–	0–1
(Australia) Cynthia Doerner	1	QPO	1976	–	0–1
(United States) Terry Holladay	1	QPO	1976	–	0–1
(United States) Carrie Meyer	1	QPO	1976	–	0–1
(United States) Kristien Shaw	1	RR	1977	–	0–3
(United Kingdom) Jo Durie	1	R16	1984	–	0–1
(United States) Lisa Bonder	1	R16	1985	–	0–1
(United States) Melissa Gurney	1	R16	1986 (Nov)	–	0–1
(Soviet Union) Larisa Savchenko	1	R16	1988	–	0–1
(United States) Gretchen Rush	1	R16	1989	–	0–1
(Germany) Sabine Hack	1	R16	1994	–	0–1
(Slovakia) Karina Habšudová	1	R16	1996	–	0–1
(Belgium) Sabine Appelmans	1	R16	1997	–	0–1
(United States) Meghann Shaughnessy	1	R16	2001	–	0–1
(Israel) Anna Smashnova	1	R16	2002	–	0–1
(Japan) Ai Sugiyama	1	RR	2003	–	1–2
(Italy) Francesca Schiavone	1	RR	2010	–	1–2
(Canada) Eugenie Bouchard	1	RR	2014	–	0–3
(Italy) Flavia Pennetta	1	RR	2015	–	1–2
(Czech Republic) Lucie Šafářová	1	RR	2015	–	1–2
(Latvia) **Jeļena Ostapenko**	1	RR	2017	–	1–2
(Canada) **Bianca Andreescu**	1	RR	2019(R)	–	0–2
(United States) **Sofia Kenin**	1	RR	2019(A−)	–	0–1
(Czech Republic) **Markéta Vondroušová**	1	RR	2023	–	0–3
**Ekaterina Alexandrova**	1	RR	2025(A−)^{†}	–	0–1
(Ukraine) **Marta Kostyuk**	1	RR	2026(A+)	–	0–3
(Czech Republic) **Karolína Muchová**	1	RR	2026(R)	2023	0–2
**Diana Shnaider**	1	RR	2026(A−)^{†}	–	0–1

† Player competed under no flag due to the Russian invasion of Ukraine.

== See also ==
- WTA Finals
