= 1983 Virginia Slims Championships – Singles =

Singles
- 1983 Virginia Slims Championships

Final
- Champion: (United States) Martina Navratilova
- Runner-up: (United States) Chris Evert-Lloyd
- Score: 6–2, 6–0

Details
- Draw: 16
- Seeds: 8

Events
Singles	Doubles
← 1982 ·	Virginia Slims Championships	· 1984 →

Martina Navratilova defeated Chris Evert-Lloyd in the final, 6–2, 6–0 to win the singles tennis title at the 1983 Virginia Slims Championships. It was her fourth Tour Finals singles title.

Sylvia Hanika was the defending champion, but was defeated in the semifinals by Navratilova.

== Seeds ==
A champion seed is indicated in bold text while text in italics indicates the round in which that seed was eliminated.

1. (United States) **Martina Navratilova (champion)**
2. (United States) Chris Evert-Lloyd (final)
3. (United States) Andrea Jaeger (first round)
4. (United States) Tracy Austin (quarterfinals)
5. (United States) Pam Shriver (quarterfinals)
6. (Australia) Wendy Turnbull (first round)
7. (West Germany) Bettina Bunge (quarterfinals)
8. (West Germany) Sylvia Hanika (semifinals)

== Draw ==
=== Key ===
- Q = Qualifier
- WC = Wild card
- LL = Lucky loser
- Alt = Alternate
- SE = Special exempt
- PR = Protected ranking
- ITF = ITF entry
- JE = Junior exempt
- w/o = Walkover
- r = Retired
- d = Defaulted
- SR = Special ranking

First round
1	(United States) **M Navratilova**	4	**6**	**6**
(Czechoslovakia) H Mandlíková	**6**	1	0
(Australia) E Goolagong Cawley	1	3
5	(United States) **P Shriver**	**6**	**6**
4	(United States) **T Austin**	5	**6**	**7**
(Romania) V Ruzici	**7**	1	6
(United States) K Rinaldi	0	2
8	(West Germany) **S Hanika**	**6**	**6**
6	(Australia) W Turnbull	3	3
(United States) **B Potter**	**6**	**6**
(United States) **BJ King**	5	**6**	**6**
3	(United States) A Jaeger	**7**	2	2
7	(West Germany) **B Bunge**	**6**	**6**
(United States) B Gadusek	3	3
(United States) Z Garrison	3	0
2	(United States) **C Evert-Lloyd**	**6**	**6**

Quarterfinals
1	(United States) **M Navratilova**	**6**	**6**
5	(United States) P Shriver	1	2
4	(United States) T Austin	4	5
8	(West Germany) **S Hanika**	**6**	**7**
(United States) B Potter	3	1
(United States) **BJ King**	**6**	**6**
7	(West Germany) B Bunge	1	5
2	(United States) **C Evert-Lloyd**	**6**	**7**

Semifinals
1	(United States) **M Navratilova**	**6**	**6**
8	(West Germany) S Hanika	1	1
(United States) BJ King	1	1
2	(United States) **C Evert-Lloyd**	**6**	**6**

Final
1	(United States) **M Navratilova**	**6**	**6**
2	(United States) C Evert-Lloyd	2	0

== See also ==
- WTA Tour Championships appearances
