= 1994 Virginia Slims Championships – Singles =

Singles
- 1994 Virginia Slims Championships

Final
- Champion: (Argentina) Gabriela Sabatini
- Runner-up: (United States) Lindsay Davenport
- Score: 6–3, 6–2, 6–4

Details
- Draw: 16
- Seeds: 8

Events
Singles	Doubles
← 1993 ·	Virginia Slims Championships	· 1995 →

Gabriela Sabatini defeated Lindsay Davenport in the final, 6–3, 6–2, 6–4 to win the singles tennis title at the 1994 Virginia Slims Championships. It was her second Tour Finals singles title.

Steffi Graf was the defending champion, but lost in the quarterfinals to Mary Pierce.

== Seeds ==
1. (Germany) Steffi Graf (quarterfinals)
2. (Spain) Arantxa Sánchez Vicario (first round)
3. (Spain) Conchita Martínez (quarterfinals)
4. (Czech Republic) Jana Novotná (quarterfinals)
5. (France) Mary Pierce (semifinals)
6. (United States) Martina Navratilova (first round)
7. (United States) Lindsay Davenport (final)
8. (Japan) Kimiko Date (semifinals)

Notes:

- (Bulgaria) Magdalena Maleeva had qualified but withdrew due to rib stress fracture
- (United States) Mary Joe Fernandez had qualified but withdrew

== Main draw ==
=== Key ===
- Q = Qualifier
- WC = Wild card
- LL = Lucky loser
- Alt = Alternate
- SE = Special exempt
- PR = Protected ranking
- ITF = ITF entry
- JE = Junior exempt
- w/o = Walkover
- r = Retired
- d = Defaulted
- SR = Special ranking
- NB: The Final was the best of 5 sets while all other rounds were the best of 3 sets.

=== Finals ===
First round
1	(Germany) Steffi Graf	7	6
(Netherlands) Brenda Schultz	5	3
(South Africa) Amanda Coetzer	7	3	3
5	(France) Mary Pierce	5	6	6
4	(Czech Republic) Jana Novotná	6	3	6
(Croatia) Iva Majoli	2	6	1
(Germany) Anke Huber	2	3
7	(United States) Lindsay Davenport	6	6
8	(Japan) Kimiko Date	6	6
(Germany) Sabine Hack	3	0
(Belarus) Natasha Zvereva	6	2	4
3	(Spain) Conchita Martínez	2	6	6
6	(United States) Martina Navratilova	4	2
(Argentina) Gabriela Sabatini	6	6
(France) Julie Halard	6	1	7^{7}
2	(Spain) Arantxa Sánchez Vicario	1	6	6^{2}

Quarterfinals
1	(Germany) Steffi Graf	4	4
5	(France) Mary Pierce	6	6
4	(Czech Republic) Jana Novotná	2	2
7	(United States) Lindsay Davenport	6	6
8	(Japan) Kimiko Date	2	6	7^{7}
3	(Spain) Conchita Martínez	6	4	6^{1}
(Argentina) Gabriela Sabatini	2	6	6
(France) Julie Halard	6	2	3

Semifinals
5	(France) Mary Pierce	3	2
7	(United States) Lindsay Davenport	6	6
8	(Japan) Kimiko Date	6	0	3
(Argentina) Gabriela Sabatini	4	6	6

Final
7	(United States) Lindsay Davenport	3	2	4
(Argentina) Gabriela Sabatini	6	6	6

== See also ==
- WTA Tour Championships appearances
