= 1985 Virginia Slims Championships – Singles =

Singles
- 1985 Virginia Slims Championships

Final
- Champion: (United States) Martina Navratilova
- Runner-up: (Czechoslovakia) Helena Suková
- Score: 6–3, 7–5, 6–4

Details
- Draw: 16
- Seeds: 4

Events
Singles	Doubles
← 1984 ·	Virginia Slims Championships	· 1986 →

Two-time defending champion Martina Navratilova successfully defended her title, defeating Helena Suková in the final, 6–3, 7–5, 6–4 to win the singles tennis title at the 1985 Virginia Slims Championships. It was her sixth Tour Finals singles title.

== Seeds ==
1. (United States) Martina Navratilova (champion)
2. (United States) Chris Evert-Lloyd (first round)
3. (Czechoslovakia) Hana Mandlíková (semifinals)
4. (Czechoslovakia) Helena Suková (final)

== Draw ==
=== Key ===
- Q = Qualifier
- WC = Wild card
- LL = Lucky loser
- Alt = Alternate
- SE = Special exempt
- PR = Protected ranking
- ITF = ITF entry
- JE = Junior exempt
- w/o = Walkover
- r = Retired
- d = Defaulted
- SR = Special ranking

First round
1	(United States) Martina Navratilova	6	6
(United States) Lisa Bonder	1	1
(United States) Pam Shriver	6	0	6
(Bulgaria) Manuela Maleeva	4	6	4
3	(Czechoslovakia) Hana Mandlíková	7	7
(Hungary) Andrea Temesvári	5	5
(West Germany) Sylvia Hanika	2	3
(United States) Zina Garrison	6	6
4	(Czechoslovakia) Helena Suková	7	7
(West Germany) Claudia Kohde-Kilsch	6	6
(Sweden) Catarina Lindqvist	3	6	6
(Australia) Wendy Turnbull	6	2	2
(Canada) Carling Bassett	3	2
(United States) Kathy Rinaldi	6	6
(United States) Kathy Jordan	6	1	6
2	(United States) Chris Evert-Lloyd	2	6	2

Quarterfinals
1	(United States) Martina Navratilova	6	6
(United States) Pam Shriver	2	4
3	(Czechoslovakia) Hana Mandlíková	6	6
(United States) Zina Garrison	3	4
4	(Czechoslovakia) Helena Suková	6	6
(Sweden) Catarina Lindqvist	4	4
(United States) Kathy Rinaldi	6	6
(United States) Kathy Jordan	1	3

Semifinals
1	(United States) Martina Navratilova	7	7
3	(Czechoslovakia) Hana Mandlíková	5	6
4	(Czechoslovakia) Helena Suková	6	6
(United States) Kathy Rinaldi	4	2

Final
1	(United States) Martina Navratilova	6	7	6
4	(Czechoslovakia) Helena Suková	3	5	4

== See also ==
- WTA Tour Championships appearances
