= 1988 Virginia Slims Championships – Singles =

Singles
- 1988 Virginia Slims Championships

Final
- Champion: (Argentina) Gabriela Sabatini
- Runner-up: (United States) Pam Shriver
- Score: 7–5, 6–2, 6–2

Details
- Draw: 16
- Seeds: 8

Events
| Singles | Doubles |
| ← 1987 · | Virginia Slims Championships | · 1989 → |

Gabriela Sabatini defeated Pam Shriver in the final, 7–5, 6–2, 6–2 to win the singles tennis title at the 1988 Virginia Slims Championships. She did not drop a set en route to the title.

Steffi Graf was the defending champion, but lost in the semifinals to Shriver. Graf was attempting to achieve a Super Slam, having won all four majors (the Australian Open, French Open, Wimbledon and US Open) and the Olympics earlier in the season.

== Seeds ==
A champion seed is indicated in bold text while text in italics indicates the round in which that seed was eliminated.

1. (West Germany) Steffi Graf (semifinals)
2. (United States) Martina Navratilova (quarterfinals)
3. (United States) Chris Evert (quarterfinals)
4. (Argentina) **Gabriela Sabatini (champion)**
5. (United States) Pam Shriver (final)
6. (Soviet Union) Natasha Zvereva (quarterfinals)
7. (Bulgaria) Manuela Maleeva-Fragnière (quarterfinals)
8. (Czechoslovakia) Helena Suková (semifinals)

== Draw ==
=== Key ===
- Q = Qualifier
- WC = Wild card
- LL = Lucky loser
- Alt = Alternate
- SE = Special exempt
- PR = Protected ranking
- ITF = ITF entry
- JE = Junior exempt
- w/o = Walkover
- r = Retired
- d = Defaulted
- SR = Special ranking
- NB: The Final was the best of 5 sets while all other rounds were the best of 3 sets.

First round
1 | (West Germany) **Steffi Graf** | **6** | 4 | **6**
(West Germany) Claudia Kohde-Kilsch | 1 | **6** | 1
(United States) Lori McNeil | 1 | 0
7 | (Bulgaria) **Manuela Maleeva-Fragnière** | **6** | **6**
3 | (United States) **Chris Evert** | 4 | **6** | **6**
(United States) Barbara Potter | **6** | 2 | 4
(West Germany) Sylvia Hanika | 3 | 4
5 | (United States) **Pam Shriver** | **6** | **6**
6 | (Soviet Union) **Natasha Zvereva** | **6** | 1 | **6**
(Canada) Helen Kelesi | 2 | **6** | 2
(Bulgaria) Katerina Maleeva | 2 | 1
4 | (Argentina) **Gabriela Sabatini** | **6** | **6**
8 | (Czechoslovakia) **Helena Suková** | 2 | **6** | **6**
(United States) Zina Garrison | **6** | 3 | 3
(Soviet Union) Larisa Savchenko | **7** | 3 | 3
2 | (United States) **Martina Navratilova** | 6 | **6** | **6**

Quarterfinals
1 | (West Germany) **Steffi Graf** | **6** | **6**
7 | (Bulgaria) Manuela Maleeva-Fragnière | 1 | 3
3 | (United States) Chris Evert | 5 | 4
5 | (United States) **Pam Shriver** | **7** | **6**
6 | (Soviet Union) Natasha Zvereva | 1 | 1
4 | (Argentina) **Gabriela Sabatini** | **6** | **6**
8 | (Czechoslovakia) **Helena Suková** | 2 | **7** | **6**
2 | (United States) Martina Navratilova | **6** | 5 | 3

Semifinals
1 | (West Germany) Steffi Graf | 3 | 6
5 | (United States) **Pam Shriver** | **6** | **7**
4 | (Argentina) **Gabriela Sabatini** | **6** | **6**
8 | (Czechoslovakia) Helena Suková | 4 | 2

Final
5 | (United States) Pam Shriver | 5 | 2 | 2
4 | (Argentina) **Gabriela Sabatini** | **7** | **6** | **6**

== See also ==
- WTA Tour Championships appearances
