= 1995 WTA Tour Championships – Singles =

Singles
- 1995 WTA Tour Championships

Final
- Champion: (Germany) Steffi Graf
- Runner-up: (Germany) Anke Huber
- Score: 6–1, 2–6, 6–1, 4–6, 6–3

Details
- Draw: 16
- Seeds: 8

Events
Singles	Doubles
← 1994 ·	WTA Tour Championships	· 1996 →

Steffi Graf defeated Anke Huber in the final, 6–1, 2–6, 6–1, 4–6, 6–3 to win the singles tennis title at the 1995 WTA Tour Championships. It was her fourth Tour Finals singles title.

Gabriela Sabatini was the defending champion, but lost in the quarterfinals to Natasha Zvereva.

== Seeds ==
1. (Germany) Steffi Graf (champion)
2. (Spain) Conchita Martínez (quarterfinals)
3. (Spain) Arantxa Sánchez Vicario (first round)
4. (France) Mary Pierce (first round)
5. (Argentina) Gabriela Sabatini (quarterfinals)
6. (Japan) Kimiko Date (quarterfinals)
7. (Bulgaria) Magdalena Maleeva (first round)
8. (United States) Mary Joe Fernandez (quarterfinals)

Note

- American Monica Seles had qualified but withdrew due to tendinitis in left knee and a sprained right ankle.

== Main draw ==
=== Key ===
- Q = Qualifier
- WC = Wild card
- LL = Lucky loser
- Alt = Alternate
- SE = Special exempt
- PR = Protected ranking
- ITF = ITF entry
- JE = Junior exempt
- w/o = Walkover
- r = Retired
- d = Defaulted
- SR = Special ranking

=== Finals ===
First round
1	(Germany) S Graf	6	6
(South Africa) A Coetzer	2	2
(United States) C Rubin	6	2	3
8	(United States) M Fernandez	3	6	6
3	(Spain) A Sánchez	6	4	4
(Belarus) N Zvereva	4	6	6
(United States) L Davenport	4	3
5	(Argentina) G Sabatini	6	6
6	(Japan) K Date	5	6	6
(Czech Republic) J Novotná	7	3	4
(Germany) A Huber	6	6
4	(France) M Pierce	2	3
7	(Bulgaria) M Maleeva	2	6^{4}
(Netherlands) B Schultz-McCarthy	6	7
(Croatia) I Majoli	6	5	0
2	(Spain) C Martínez	1	7	6

Quarterfinals
1	(Germany) S Graf	6	6
8	(United States) M Fernandez	3	4
(Belarus) N Zvereva	6	5	7
5	(Argentina) G Sabatini	2	7	5
6	(Japan) K Date	6	2	1
(Germany) A Huber	3	6	6
(Netherlands) B Schultz-McCarthy	7	6
2	(Spain) C Martínez	5	2

Semifinals
1	(Germany) S Graf	6	6
(Belarus) N Zvereva	4	3
(Germany) A Huber	6	6
(Netherlands) B Schultz-McCarthy	3	3

Final
1	(Germany) S Graf	6	2	6	4	6
(Germany) A Huber	1	6	1	6	3

== See also ==
- WTA Tour Championships appearances
