= 1986 Virginia Slims Championships (March) – Singles =

Singles
- 1986 Virginia Slims Championships (March)

Final
- Champion: (United States) Martina Navratilova
- Runner-up: (Czechoslovakia) Hana Mandlíková
- Score: 6–2, 6–0, 3–6, 6–2

Details
- Draw: 16
- Seeds: 8

Events
Singles	Doubles
← 1985 ·	WTA Tour Championships	· 1986 →

Three-time defending champion Martina Navratilova successfully defended her title, defeating Hana Mandlíková in the final, 6–2, 6–0, 3–6, 6–2 to win the singles tennis title at the March edition of the 1986 Virginia Slims Championships. It was her seventh Tour Finals singles title.

== Seeds ==
1. (United States) Martina Navratilova (champion)
2. (United States) Chris Evert (semifinals)
3. (West Germany) Steffi Graf (semifinals)
4. (West Germany) Claudia Kohde-Kilsch (quarterfinals)
5. (Czechoslovakia) Hana Mandlíková (final)
6. (United States) Pam Shriver (quarterfinals)
7. (Czechoslovakia) Helena Suková (quarterfinals)
8. (Bulgaria) Manuela Maleeva (first round)

== Draw ==
=== Key ===
- Q = Qualifier
- WC = Wild card
- LL = Lucky loser
- Alt = Alternate
- SE = Special exempt
- PR = Protected ranking
- ITF = ITF entry
- JE = Junior exempt
- w/o = Walkover
- r = Retired
- d = Defaulted
- SR = Special ranking

First round
1	(United States) Martina Navratilova	6	6
(United States) Terry Phelps	1	1
(United States) Bonnie Gadusek	1	6	6
8	(Bulgaria) Manuela Maleeva	6	4	3
3	(West Germany) Steffi Graf	6	6^{5}	6
(Argentina) Gabriela Sabatini	0	7^{7}	2
(Canada) Carling Bassett	3	0
6	(United States) Pam Shriver	6	6
5	(Czechoslovakia) Hana Mandlíková	2	6	6
(United States) Zina Garrison	6	3	2
(Australia) Wendy Turnbull	6^{3}	2
4	(West Germany) Claudia Kohde-Kilsch	7^{7}	6
7	(Czechoslovakia) Helena Suková	6^{6}	6	7^{7}
(United States) Kathy Rinaldi	7^{8}	3	6^{5}
(United States) Barbara Potter	2	4
2	(United States) Chris Evert	6	6

Quarterfinals
1	(United States) Martina Navratilova	6	6
(United States) Bonnie Gadusek	3	4
3	(West Germany) Steffi Graf	4	7^{7}	6
6	(United States) Pam Shriver	6	6^{5}	3
5	(Czechoslovakia) Hana Mandlíková	4	6	7
4	(West Germany) Claudia Kohde-Kilsch	6	4	5
7	(Czechoslovakia) Helena Suková	6	1	1
2	(United States) Chris Evert	1	6	6

Semifinals
1	(United States) Martina Navratilova	6	6
3	(West Germany) Steffi Graf	2	2
5	(Czechoslovakia) Hana Mandlíková	6	7
2	(United States) Chris Evert	3	5

Final
1	(United States) Martina Navratilova	6	6	3	6
5	(Czechoslovakia) Hana Mandlíková	2	0	6	2

== See also ==
- WTA Tour Championships appearances
