= 1993 Virginia Slims Championships – Doubles =

Doubles
- 1993 Virginia Slims Championships

Final
- Champions: (United States) Gigi Fernández (Belarus) Natasha Zvereva
- Runners-up: (Latvia) Larisa Neiland (Czech Republic) Jana Novotná
- Score: 6–3, 7–5

Details
- Draw: 8
- Seeds: 4

Events
Singles	Doubles
← 1992 ·	Virginia Slims Championships	· 1994 →

Gigi Fernández and Natasha Zvereva defeated Larisa Neiland and Jana Novotná in the final, 6–3, 7–5 to win the doubles tennis title at the 1993 Virginia Slims Championships.

Arantxa Sánchez Vicario and Helena Suková were the defending champions, but were defeated in the semifinals by Neiland and Novotná.

== Seeds ==
1. (United States) Gigi Fernández / (Belarus) Natasha Zvereva (champions)
2. (Spain) Arantxa Sánchez Vicario / (Czech Republic) Helena Suková (semifinals)
3. (Latvia) Larisa Neiland / (Czech Republic) Jana Novotná (final)
4. (United States) Pam Shriver / (Australia) Elizabeth Smylie (semifinals)

== Draw ==
=== Key ===
- Q = Qualifier
- WC = Wild card
- LL = Lucky loser
- Alt = Alternate
- SE = Special exempt
- PR = Protected ranking
- ITF = ITF entry
- JE = Junior exempt
- w/o = Walkover
- r = Retired
- d = Defaulted
- SR = Special ranking

=== Finals ===
Quarterfinals
1	(United States) Gigi Fernández (Belarus) Natasha Zvereva	6	6
(United States) Katrina Adams (Netherlands) Manon Bollegraf	3	4
4	(United States) Pam Shriver (Australia) Elizabeth Smylie	7^{7}	7
(Canada) Jill Hetherington (United States) Kathy Rinaldi	6^{2}	5
(United States) Lori McNeil (Australia) Rennae Stubbs	4	6	2
3	(Latvia) Larisa Neiland (Czech Republic) Jana Novotná	6	3	6
(South Africa) Amanda Coetzer (Argentina) Inés Gorrochategui	3	3
2	(Spain) Arantxa Sánchez Vicario (Czech Republic) Helena Suková	6	6

Semifinals
1	(United States) Gigi Fernández (Belarus) Natasha Zvereva	6	6
4	(United States) Pam Shriver (Australia) Elizabeth Smylie	1	2
3	(Latvia) Larisa Neiland (Czech Republic) Jana Novotná	7^{7}	3	6
2	(Spain) Arantxa Sánchez Vicario (Czech Republic) Helena Suková	6^{5}	6	3

Final
1	(United States) Gigi Fernández (Belarus) Natasha Zvereva	6	7
3	(Latvia) Larisa Neiland (Czech Republic) Jana Novotná	3	5

== See also ==
- WTA Tour Championships appearances
