= 2000 WTA Tour Championships – Singles =

Singles
- 2000 WTA Tour Championships

Final
- Champion: (Switzerland) Martina Hingis
- Runner-up: (United States) Monica Seles
- Score: 6–7^{(5–7)}, 6–4, 6–4

Details
- Draw: 16
- Seeds: 8

Events
Singles	Doubles
← 1999 ·	WTA Tour Championships	· 2001 →

Martina Hingis defeated Monica Seles in the final, 6–7^{(5–7)}, 6–4, 6–4 to win the singles tennis title at the 2000 WTA Tour Championships. It was her second Tour Finals singles title.

Lindsay Davenport was the defending champion, but lost in the first round to Elena Dementieva.

== Seeds ==
1. (Switzerland) Martina Hingis (champion)
2. (United States) Lindsay Davenport (first round)
3. (United States) Monica Seles (final)
4. (Spain) Conchita Martínez (quarterfinals)
5. (Spain) Arantxa Sánchez Vicario (first round)
6. (France) Nathalie Tauziat (quarterfinals)
7. (Russia) Anna Kournikova (semifinals)
8. (United States) Chanda Rubin (first round)

Notes:

- (United States) Venus Williams had qualified but pulled out due to anemia
- (United States) Serena Williams had qualified but pulled out due to left foot injury
- (France) Mary Pierce had qualified but pulled out due to right hand injury
- (France) Amélie Mauresmo had qualified but pulled out due to left leg injury
- (Germany) Anke Huber had qualified but pulled out due to right wrist injury

== Draw ==
=== Key ===
- Q = Qualifier
- WC = Wild card
- LL = Lucky loser
- Alt = Alternate
- SE = Special exempt
- PR = Protected ranking
- ITF = ITF entry
- JE = Junior exempt
- w/o = Walkover
- r = Retired
- d = Defaulted
- SR = Special ranking

=== Finals ===
First round
1	(Switzerland) Martina Hingis	6	6
(France) Julie Halard	2	3
(United States) Amy Frazier	3	2
6	(France) Nathalie Tauziat	6	6
4	(Spain) Conchita Martínez	2	6	6
(Russia) Elena Likhovtseva	6	4	3
(United States) Jennifer Capriati	4	3
7	(Russia) Anna Kournikova	6	6
8	(United States) Chanda Rubin	2	1
(South Africa) Amanda Coetzer	6	6
(France) Sandrine Testud	3	4
3	(United States) Monica Seles	6	6
5	(Spain) Arantxa Sánchez Vicario	5	4
(Belgium) Kim Clijsters	7	6
(Russia) Elena Dementieva	3	7^{9}	6
2	(United States) Lindsay Davenport	6	6^{7}	4

Quarterfinals
1	(Switzerland) Martina Hingis	6	6^{2}	6
6	(France) Nathalie Tauziat	1	7^{7}	2
4	(Spain) Conchita Martínez	4	0
7	(Russia) Anna Kournikova	6	6
(South Africa) Amanda Coetzer	3	4
3	(United States) Monica Seles	6	6
(Belgium) Kim Clijsters	4	6	4
(Russia) Elena Dementieva	6	2	6

Semifinals
1	(Switzerland) Martina Hingis	7^{7}	6
7	(Russia) Anna Kournikova	6^{2}	2
3	(United States) Monica Seles	6	7^{7}
(Russia) Elena Dementieva	1	6^{4}

Final
1	(Switzerland) Martina Hingis	6^{5}	6	6
3	(United States) Monica Seles	7^{7}	4	4

== See also ==
- WTA Tour Championships appearances
