= 1987 Virginia Slims Championships – Singles =

Singles
- 1987 Virginia Slims Championships

Final
- Champion: (West Germany) Steffi Graf
- Runner-up: (Argentina) Gabriela Sabatini
- Score: 4–6, 6–4, 6–0, 6–4

Details
- Draw: 16
- Seeds: 4

Events
Singles	Doubles
← 1986 ·	Virginia Slims Championships	· 1988 →

Steffi Graf defeated Gabriela Sabatini in the final, 4–6, 6–4, 6–0, 6–4 to win the singles tennis title at the 1987 Virginia Slims Championships. This marked the eleventh career meeting between time Graf and Sabatini, with Graf winning all eleven matches.

Martina Navratilova was the five-time defending champion, but lost in the quarterfinals to Sabatini.

== Seeds ==
1. (West Germany) Steffi Graf (champion)
2. (United States) Martina Navratilova (quarterfinals)
3. (United States) Chris Evert (first round)
4. (United States) Pam Shriver (quarterfinals)

== Draw ==
=== Key ===
- Q = Qualifier
- WC = Wild card
- LL = Lucky loser
- Alt = Alternate
- SE = Special exempt
- PR = Protected ranking
- ITF = ITF entry
- JE = Junior exempt
- w/o = Walkover
- r = Retired
- d = Defaulted
- SR = Special ranking

First round
1	(West Germany) Steffi Graf	6	6
(United States) Zina Garrison	0	3
(United States) Lori McNeil	6	5	2
(Czechoslovakia) Helena Suková	2	7	6
3	(United States) Chris Evert	4	4
(West Germany) Sylvia Hanika	6	6
(Italy) Raffaella Reggi	7
(Czechoslovakia) Hana Mandlíková	5	r
(Bulgaria) Manuela Maleeva-Fragnière	4	6	6
(West Germany) Claudia Kohde-Kilsch	6	4	3
(Bulgaria) Katerina Maleeva	1	6	3
4	(United States) Pam Shriver	6	3	6
(Argentina) Gabriela Sabatini	6	7
(West Germany) Bettina Bunge	2	6
(Sweden) Catarina Lindqvist	4	6
2	(United States) Martina Navratilova	6	7

Quarterfinals
1	(West Germany) Steffi Graf	6	2
(Czechoslovakia) Helena Suková	2	0^{r}
(West Germany) Sylvia Hanika	6	4	6
(Italy) Raffaella Reggi	2	6	0
(Bulgaria) Manuela Maleeva-Fragnière	6	3	7
4	(United States) Pam Shriver	2	6	5
(Argentina) Gabriela Sabatini	6	7
2	(United States) Martina Navratilova	4	5

Semifinals
1	(West Germany) Steffi Graf	6	6
(West Germany) Sylvia Hanika	1	4
(Bulgaria) Manuela Maleeva-Fragnière	3	6	3
(Argentina) Gabriela Sabatini	6	4	6

Final
1	(West Germany) Steffi Graf	4	6	6	6
(Argentina) Gabriela Sabatini	6	4	0	4

== See also ==
- WTA Tour Championships appearances
