= 1985 Virginia Slims Championships =

- Date: March 18—24
- Edition: 14th
- Draw: 16S / 8D
- Prize money: $500,000
- Surface: Carpet / indoor
- Location: New York City, United States
- Venue: Madison Square Garden

Champions

Singles
- (United States) Martina Navratilova

Doubles
- (United States) Martina Navratilova / (United States) Pam Shriver
← 1984 ·	Virginia Slims Championships	· 1986 →

The 1985 Virginia Slims Championships were the fourteenth WTA Tour Championships, the annual tennis tournament for the best female tennis players in singles on the 1984 WTA Tour, which ran from March 1984 to March 1985. It was held in the week of 18 March 1985 and played on indoor carpet courts in Madison Square Garden in New York City, United States.

== Finals ==
=== Singles ===
(United States) Martina Navratilova defeated (Czechoslovakia) Helena Suková, 6–3, 7–5, 6–4

=== Doubles ===
(United States) Martina Navratilova / (United States) Pam Shriver defeated (West Germany) Claudia Kohde-Kilsch / (Czechoslovakia) Helena Suková, 6–7, 6–4, 7–6
