= 1990 Virginia Slims Championships – Singles =

Singles
- 1990 Virginia Slims Championships

Final
- Champion: (Socialist Federal Republic of Yugoslavia) Monica Seles
- Runner-up: (Argentina) Gabriela Sabatini
- Score: 6–4, 5–7, 3–6, 6–4, 6–2

Details
- Draw: 16
- Seeds: 8

Events
Singles	Doubles
← 1989 ·	Virginia Slims Championships	· 1991 →

Monica Seles defeated Gabriela Sabatini in the final, 6–4, 5–7, 3–6, 6–4, 6–2 to win the singles tennis title at the 1990 Virginia Slims Championships. The final lasted 3 hours and 47 minutes, the longest final by time in the tournament's history.

Steffi Graf was the defending champion, but lost in the semifinals to Sabatini.

== Seeds ==
1. (Germany) Steffi Graf (semifinals)
2. (Socialist Federal Republic of Yugoslavia) Monica Seles (champion)
3. (Argentina) Gabriela Sabatini (final)
4. (United States) Mary Joe Fernandez (semifinals)
5. (Spain) Arantxa Sánchez Vicario (quarterfinals)
6. (Bulgaria) Katerina Maleeva (quarterfinals)
7. (United States) Zina Garrison (first round)
8. (Switzerland) Manuela Maleeva-Fragnière (quarterfinals)

Note

- (United States) Martina Navratilova had qualified but withdrew due to knee surgery

== Draw ==
=== Key ===
- Q = Qualifier
- WC = Wild card
- LL = Lucky loser
- Alt = Alternate
- SE = Special exempt
- PR = Protected ranking
- ITF = ITF entry
- JE = Junior exempt
- w/o = Walkover
- r = Retired
- d = Defaulted
- SR = Special ranking

=== Finals ===
- NB: The final was the best of 5 sets while all other rounds were the best of 3 sets.

First round
1	(Germany) S Graf	6	5	6
(United States) J Capriati	3	7	3
(Czechoslovakia) H Suková	3	3
6	(Bulgaria) K Maleeva	6	6
3	(Argentina) G Sabatini	6	5	7
(Czechoslovakia) J Novotná	1	7	6
(Spain) C Martínez	6	6
7	(United States) Z Garrison	3	0
8	(Switzerland) M Maleeva-Fragnière	2	6	6
(Austria) J Wiesner	6	1	0
(France) N Tauziat	1	6
4	(United States) MJ Fernandez	6	7
5	(Spain) A Sánchez Vicario	6	7
(Soviet Union) N Zvereva	2	5
(Austria) B Paulus	2	2
2	(Socialist Federal Republic of Yugoslavia) M Seles	6	6

Quarterfinals
1	(Germany) S Graf	6	6
6	(Bulgaria) K Maleeva	3	0
3	(Argentina) G Sabatini	6	1	6
(Spain) C Martínez	4	6	1
8	(Switzerland) M Maleeva-Fragnière	2	4
4	(United States) MJ Fernandez	6	6
5	(Spain) A Sánchez Vicario	7	6	4
2	(Socialist Federal Republic of Yugoslavia) M Seles	5	7	6

Semifinals
1	(Germany) S Graf	4	4
3	(Argentina) G Sabatini	6	6
4	(United States) MJ Fernandez	3	4
2	(Socialist Federal Republic of Yugoslavia) M Seles	6	6

Final
3	(Argentina) G Sabatini	4	7	6	4	2
2	(Socialist Federal Republic of Yugoslavia) M Seles	6	5	3	6	6

== See also ==
- WTA Tour Championships appearances
