= 1986 Virginia Slims Championships (November) – Singles =

Singles
- 1986 Virginia Slims Championships (November)

Final
- Champion: (United States) Martina Navratilova
- Runner-up: (West Germany) Steffi Graf
- Score: 7–6^{(8–6)}, 6–3, 6–2

Details
- Draw: 16
- Seeds: 8

Events
Singles	Doubles
← 1986 ·	WTA Tour Championships	· 1987 →

Four-time defending champion Martina Navratilova successfully defended her title, defeating Steffi Graf in the final, 7–6^{(8–6)}, 6–3, 6–2 to win the singles tennis title at the November edition of the 1986 Virginia Slims Championships. It was her eighth Tour Finals singles title.

== Seeds ==
1. (United States) Martina Navratilova (champion)
2. (West Germany) Steffi Graf (final)
3. (Czechoslovakia) Hana Mandlíková (quarterfinals)
4. (Czechoslovakia) Helena Suková (semifinals)
5. (United States) Pam Shriver (semifinals)
6. (West Germany) Claudia Kohde-Kilsch (quarterfinals)
7. (Bulgaria) Manuela Maleeva (quarterfinals)
8. (United States) Kathy Rinaldi (first round)

== Draw ==
=== Key ===
- Q = Qualifier
- WC = Wild card
- LL = Lucky loser
- Alt = Alternate
- SE = Special exempt
- PR = Protected ranking
- ITF = ITF entry
- JE = Junior exempt
- w/o = Walkover
- r = Retired
- d = Defaulted
- SR = Special ranking

First round
1	(United States) Martina Navratilova	6	6
(Sweden) Catarina Lindqvist	3	0
(West Germany) Bettina Bunge	7	6
8	(United States) Kathy Rinaldi	5	4
3	(Czechoslovakia) Hana Mandlíková	6	6
(United States) Terry Phelps	2	4
(Italy) Raffaella Reggi	3	1
5	(United States) Pam Shriver	6	6
6	(West Germany) Claudia Kohde-Kilsch	6	7
(United States) Zina Garrison	3	5
(Argentina) Gabriela Sabatini	4	4
4	(Czechoslovakia) Helena Suková	6	6
7	(Bulgaria) Manuela Maleeva	6	6
(United States) Melissa Gurney	4	1
(United States) Lori McNeil	5	6	2
2	(West Germany) Steffi Graf	7	4	6

Quarterfinals
1	(United States) Martina Navratilova	6	6
(West Germany) Bettina Bunge	2	4
3	(Czechoslovakia) Hana Mandlíková	6	5	1
5	(United States) Pam Shriver	4	7	6
6	(West Germany) Claudia Kohde-Kilsch	3	6^{5}
4	(Czechoslovakia) Helena Suková	6	7^{7}
7	(Bulgaria) Manuela Maleeva	6	3	5
2	(West Germany) Steffi Graf	3	6	7

Semifinals
1	(United States) Martina Navratilova	6	4	6
5	(United States) Pam Shriver	2	6	4
4	(Czechoslovakia) Helena Suková	6^{5}	6	1
2	(West Germany) Steffi Graf	7^{7}	3	6

Final
1	(United States) Martina Navratilova	7^{8}	6	6
2	(West Germany) Steffi Graf	6^{6}	3	2

== See also ==
- WTA Tour Championships appearances
