= 1997 WTA Tour Championships – Singles =

Singles
- 1997 WTA Tour Championships

Final
- Champion: (Czech Republic) Jana Novotná
- Runner-up: (France) Mary Pierce
- Score: 7–6^{(7–4)}, 6–3, 6–2

Details
- Draw: 16
- Seeds: 8

Events
Singles	Doubles
- WTA Tour Championships

Jana Novotná defeated Mary Pierce in the final, 7–6(4), 6–3, 6–2 to win the singles tennis title at the 1997 WTA Tour Championships.

Steffi Graf was the two-time defending champion, but did not compete this year.

== Seeds ==
A champion seed is indicated in bold text while text in italics indicates the round in which that seed was eliminated.

1. (Switzerland) Martina Hingis (quarterfinals)
2. (Czech Republic) **Jana Novotná (champion)**
3. (United States) Lindsay Davenport (first round)
4. (South Africa) Amanda Coetzer (first round)
5. (United States) Monica Seles (first round)
6. (Croatia) Iva Majoli (quarterfinals)
7. (France) Mary Pierce (final)
8. (Romania) Irina Spîrlea (semifinals)

== Main draw ==
Key

- Q = Qualifier
- WC = Wild card
- LL = Lucky loser
- Alt = Alternate
- ITF = ITF entry
- PR = Protected ranking
- SR = Special ranking
- SE = Special exempt
- JE = Junior exempt
- JR = Junior Accelerator Programme entrant
- CO = College Accelerator Programme entrant
- NG = Next Gen Accelerator Program entrant
- w/o = Walkover
- r = Retired
- d = Defaulted
- NB: The final was a best of five sets while all other rounds were the best of three sets.

First round
1	(Switzerland) **Martina Hingis**	**7**	5
(Netherlands) Brenda Schultz-McCarthy	6	2	r
(Belgium) Sabine Appelmans	3	4
7	(France) **Mary Pierce**	**6**	**6**
4	(South Africa) Amanda Coetzer	3	3
(France) **Nathalie Tauziat**	**6**	**6**
(Germany) Anke Huber	6	6
6	(Croatia) **Iva Majoli**	**7**	**7**
8	(Romania) **Irina Spîrlea**	**6**	5	**6**
(France) Sandrine Testud	3	**7**	4
(United States) **Mary Joe Fernández**	2	**6**	**7**
3	(United States) Lindsay Davenport	**6**	4	6
5	(United States) Monica Seles	**6**	4	4
(Spain) **Arantxa Sánchez Vicario**	3	**6**	**6**
(Spain) Conchita Martínez	4	4
2	(Czech Republic) **Jana Novotná**	**6**	**6**

Quarterfinals
1	(Switzerland) Martina Hingis	3	**6**	5
7	(France) **Mary Pierce**	**6**	2	**7**
(France) **Nathalie Tauziat**	**7**	**7**
6	(Croatia) Iva Majoli	6	6
8	(Romania) **Irina Spîrlea**	5	**6**	**7**
(United States) Mary Joe Fernández	**7**	2	5
(Spain) Arantxa Sánchez Vicario	4	**6**	1
2	(Czech Republic) **Jana Novotná**	**6**	3	**6**

Semifinals
7	(France) **Mary Pierce**	**6**	5	**6**
(France) Nathalie Tauziat	2	**7**	4
8	(Romania) Irina Spîrlea	6	2
2	(Czech Republic) **Jana Novotná**	**7**	**6**

Final
7	(France) Mary Pierce	6^{4}	2	3
2	(Czech Republic) **Jana Novotná**	**7^{7}**	**6**	**6**

== See also ==
- WTA Tour Championships appearances
