= 2001 WTA Tour Championships – Doubles =

Doubles
- 2001 WTA Tour Championships

Final
- Champions: (United States) Lisa Raymond (Australia) Rennae Stubbs
- Runners-up: (Zimbabwe) Cara Black (Russia) Elena Likhovtseva
- Score: 7–5, 3–6, 6–3

Details
- Draw: 8
- Seeds: 4

Events
Singles	Doubles
← 2000 ·	WTA Tour Championships	· 2002 →

Lisa Raymond and Rennae Stubbs defeated Cara Black and Elena Likhovtseva in the final, 7–5, 3–6, 6–3 to win the doubles tennis title at the 2001 WTA Tour Championships.

Martina Hingis and Anna Kournikova were the two-time reigning champions, but did not participate this year.

== Seeds ==
1. (United States) Lisa Raymond / (Australia) Rennae Stubbs (champions)
2. (United States) Kimberly Po / (France) Nathalie Tauziat (semifinals)
3. (Zimbabwe) Cara Black / (Russia) Elena Likhovtseva (final)
4. (Spain) Virginia Ruano Pascual / (Argentina) Paola Suárez (semifinals)

== Draw ==
=== Key ===
- Q = Qualifier
- WC = Wild card
- LL = Lucky loser
- Alt = Alternate
- SE = Special exempt
- PR = Protected ranking
- ITF = ITF entry
- JE = Junior exempt
- w/o = Walkover
- r = Retired
- d = Defaulted
- SR = Special ranking

=== Draw ===
First round
1	(United States) Lisa Raymond (Australia) Rennae Stubbs	6	6
(Slovenia) Tina Križan (Slovenia) Katarina Srebotnik	3	4
4	(Spain) Virginia Ruano Pascual (Argentina) Paola Suárez	4	7^{7}	6
(France) Alexandra Fusai (Italy) Rita Grande	6	6^{3}	2
(France) Sandrine Testud (Italy) Roberta Vinci	3	4
3	(Zimbabwe) Cara Black (Russia) Elena Likhovtseva	6	6
(South Africa) Amanda Coetzer (United States) Lori McNeil	6	3	4
2	(United States) Kimberly Po (France) Nathalie Tauziat	1	6	6

Semifinals
1	(United States) Lisa Raymond (Australia) Rennae Stubbs	6	3
4	(Spain) Virginia Ruano Pascual (Argentina) Paola Suárez	3	0^{r}
3	(Zimbabwe) Cara Black (Russia) Elena Likhovtseva	7	6
2	(United States) Kimberly Po (France) Nathalie Tauziat	5	4

Finals
1	(United States) Lisa Raymond (Australia) Rennae Stubbs	7	3	6
3	(Zimbabwe) Cara Black (Russia) Elena Likhovtseva	5	6	3
