= 1989 Virginia Slims Championships – Singles =

Singles
- 1989 Virginia Slims Championships

Final
- Champion: (West Germany) Steffi Graf
- Runner-up: (United States) Martina Navratilova
- Score: 6–4, 7–5, 2–6, 6–2

Details
- Draw: 16
- Seeds: 8

Events
Singles	Doubles
← 1988 ·	Virginia Slims Championships	· 1990 →

Steffi Graf defeated Martina Navratilova in the final, 6–4, 7–5, 2–6, 6–2 to win the singles tennis title at the 1989 Virginia Slims Championships. It was her second Tour Finals singles title.

Gabriela Sabatini was the defending champion, but lost in the semifinals to Graf.

== Seeds ==
A champion seed is indicated in bold text while text in italics indicates the round in which that seed was eliminated.

1. (West Germany) **Steffi Graf (champion)**
2. (United States) Martina Navratilova (final)
3. (Argentina) Gabriela Sabatini (semifinals)
4. (Spain) Arantxa Sánchez Vicario (semifinals)
5. (United States) Zina Garrison (quarterfinals)
6. (Socialist Federal Republic of Yugoslavia) Monica Seles (quarterfinals)
7. (Czechoslovakia) Helena Suková (quarterfinals)
8. (Bulgaria) Manuela Maleeva-Fragnière (quarterfinals)

== Draw ==
=== Key ===
- Q = Qualifier
- WC = Wild card
- LL = Lucky loser
- Alt = Alternate
- SE = Special exempt
- PR = Protected ranking
- ITF = ITF entry
- JE = Junior exempt
- w/o = Walkover
- r = Retired
- d = Defaulted
- SR = Special ranking
- NB: The Final was the best of 5 sets while all other rounds were the best of 3 sets.

First round
1	**(West Germany) Steffi Graf**	**6**	**6**
(Czechoslovakia) Jana Novotná	3	4
(Italy) Raffaella Reggi	3	5
7	**(Czechoslovakia) Helena Suková**	**6**	**7**
3	**(Argentina) Gabriela Sabatini**	**6**	**6**
(United States) Gretchen Magers	4	1
(Canada) Helen Kelesi	3	1
5	**(United States) Zina Garrison**	**6**	**6**
8	**(Bulgaria) Manuela Maleeva-Fragnière**	**6**	**6**
(Australia) Hana Mandlíková	1	1
(Sweden) Catarina Lindqvist	6	3
4	**(Spain) Arantxa Sánchez Vicario**	**7**	**6**
6	**(Socialist Federal Republic of Yugoslavia) Monica Seles**	**6**	**6**
(Spain) Conchita Martínez	0	1
(United States) Mary Joe Fernández	2	3
2	**(United States) Martina Navratilova**	**6**	**6**

Quarterfinals
1	**(West Germany) Steffi Graf**	**6**	**6**
7	(Czechoslovakia) Helena Suková	2	1
3	**(Argentina) Gabriela Sabatini**	**6**	5	**6**
5	(United States) Zina Garrison	3	**7**	3
8	(Bulgaria) Manuela Maleeva-Fragnière	5	6
4	**(Spain) Arantxa Sánchez Vicario**	**7**	**7**
6	(Socialist Federal Republic of Yugoslavia) Monica Seles	3	**7**	5
2	**(United States) Martina Navratilova**	**6**	5	**7**

Semifinals
1	**(West Germany) Steffi Graf**	**6**	5	**6**
3	(Argentina) Gabriela Sabatini	3	**7**	1
4	(Spain) Arantxa Sánchez Vicario	2	2
2	**(United States) Martina Navratilova**	**6**	**6**

Final
1	**(West Germany) Steffi Graf**	**6**	**7**	2	**6**
2	(United States) Martina Navratilova	4	5	**6**	2

== See also ==
- WTA Tour Championships appearances
