= 1972 Virginia Slims Championships – Singles =

Singles
- 1972 Virginia Slims Championships

Final
- Champion: (United States) Chris Evert
- Runner-up: (Australia) Kerry Melville
- Score: 7–5, 6–4

Details
- Draw: 16 (4 Q )
- Seeds: 8

Events
Singles
Virginia Slims Championships	· 1973 →

Chris Evert defeated Kerry Melville in the final, 7–5, 6–4 to win the singles tennis title at the 1972 Virginia Slims Championships.

This was the inaugural edition of the tournament.

== Seeds ==
1. (United States) Billie Jean King (semifinals)
2. (United States) Nancy Richey (first round)
3. (Australia) Margaret Smith Court (first round)
4. (United States) Chris Evert (champion)
5. (United States) Rosie Casals (first round)
6. (Australia) Kerry Melville (final)
7. (France) Françoise Dürr (semifinals)
8. (United States) Wendy Overton (quarterfinals)

== Draw ==
=== Key ===
- Q = Qualifier
- WC = Wild card
- LL = Lucky loser
- Alt = Alternate
- SE = Special exempt
- PR = Protected ranking
- ITF = ITF entry
- JE = Junior exempt
- w/o = Walkover
- r = Retired
- d = Defaulted
- SR = Special ranking

First round
1	(United States) Billie Jean King	6	6
(Australia) Lesley Hunt	1	1
Q	(Australia) Wendy Gilchrist	0	7	2
8	(United States) Wendy Overton	6	5	6
5	(United States) Rosie Casals	3	3
(Australia) Karen Krantzcke	6	6
Q	(United States) Laurie Fleming	1	1
4	(United States) Chris Evert	6	6
3	(Australia) Margaret Court	6	6	5^{r}
Q	(United States) Jeanne Evert	7	2	2
(United States) Valerie Ziegenfuss	0	1
6	(Australia) Kerry Melville	6	6
7	(France) Françoise Dürr	6	6
(United States) Julie Heldman	2	2
Q	(Netherlands) Betty Stöve	6	7
2	(United States) Nancy Richey	6	3

Quarterfinals
1	(United States) Billie Jean King	7	6
(United States) Wendy Overton	5	2
(Australia) Karen Krantzcke	2	2
4	(United States) Chris Evert	6	6
(United States) Jeanne Evert	4	1
6	(Australia) Kerry Melville	6	6
7	(France) Françoise Dürr	3	7	6
(Netherlands) Betty Stöve	6	6	1

Semifinals
1	(United States) Billie Jean King	4	2
4	(United States) Chris Evert	6	6
6	(Australia) Kerry Melville	6	6
7	(France) Françoise Dürr	2	3

Finals
4	(United States) Chris Evert	7	6
6	(Australia) Kerry Melville	5	4

== See also ==
- WTA Tour Championships appearances
