= 1998 Chase Championships – Doubles =

Doubles
- 1998 Chase Championships
- 1997 Champions: (United States) Lindsay Davenport (Czech Republic) Jana Novotná

Final
- Champions: (United States) Lindsay Davenport (Belarus) Natasha Zvereva
- Runners-up: (France) Alexandra Fusai (France) Nathalie Tauziat
- Score: 6–7^{(6–8)}, 7–5, 6–3

Details
- Draw: 8
- Seeds: 4

Events
Singles	Doubles
← 1997 ·	Chase Championships	· 1999 →

Two-time defending champion Lindsay Davenport and her partner Natasha Zvereva defeated Alexandra Fusai and Nathalie Tauziat in the final, 6–7^{(6–8)}, 7–5, 6–3 to win the doubles tennis title at the 1998 WTA Tour Championships.

Davenport and Jana Novotná were the defending champions, but they competed with different partners that year: Davenport with Zvereva, and Novotná with Martina Hingis. Hingis and Novotná were defeated in the quarterfinals by Yayuk Basuki and Caroline Vis.

== Seeds ==
Champion seeds are indicated in bold text while text in italics indicates the round in which those seeds were eliminated.

1. (Switzerland) Martina Hingis / (Czech Republic) Jana Novotná (quarterfinals)
2. (United States) **Lindsay Davenport** / (Belarus) **Natasha Zvereva (champions)**
3. (United States) Lisa Raymond / (Australia) Rennae Stubbs (semifinals)
4. (France) Alexandra Fusai / (France) Nathalie Tauziat (final)

== Draw ==
=== Key ===
- Q = Qualifier
- WC = Wild card
- LL = Lucky loser
- Alt = Alternate
- SE = Special exempt
- PR = Protected ranking
- ITF = ITF entry
- JE = Junior exempt
- w/o = Walkover
- r = Retired
- d = Defaulted
- SR = Special ranking

Quarterfinals
1	(Switzerland) Martina Hingis (Czech Republic) Jana Novotná	4	**6**	4
(Indonesia) **Yayuk Basuki** (Netherlands) **Caroline Vis**	**6**	2	**6**
4	(France) **Alexandra Fusai** (France) **Nathalie Tauziat**	4	**6**	**6**
(Russia) Elena Likhovtseva (Japan) Ai Sugiyama	**6**	1	4
(Spain) Conchita Martínez (Argentina) Patricia Tarabini	2	2
3	(United States) **Lisa Raymond** (Australia) **Rennae Stubbs**	**6**	**6**
(Russia) Anna Kournikova (Latvia) Larisa Neiland	2	3
2	(United States) **Lindsay Davenport** (Belarus) **Natasha Zvereva**	**6**	**6**

Semifinals
(Indonesia) Yayuk Basuki (Netherlands) Caroline Vis	2	**6**	3
4	(France) **Alexandra Fusai** (France) **Nathalie Tauziat**	**6**	3	**6**
3	(United States) Lisa Raymond (Australia) Rennae Stubbs	3	1
2	(United States) **Lindsay Davenport** (Belarus) **Natasha Zvereva**	**6**	**6**

Finals
4	(France) Alexandra Fusai (France) Nathalie Tauziat	**7^{8}**	5	3
2	(United States) **Lindsay Davenport** (Belarus) **Natasha Zvereva**	6^{6}	**7**	**6**
