= 1983 Virginia Slims Championships =

- Date: March 23–27
- Edition: 12th (singles) / 8th (doubles)
- Category: Virginia Slims Championships
- Prize money: $350,000
- Location: New York City, US
- Venue: Madison Square Garden

Champions

Singles
- (United States) Martina Navratilova

Doubles
- (United States) Martina Navratilova / (United States) Pam Shriver
← 1982 ·	Virginia Slims Championships	· 1984 →

The 1983 Virginia Slims Championships was a tennis tournament played on indoor carpet courts at Madison Square Garden in New York City, New York in the United States. It was the 12th edition of the year-end singles championships, the 8th edition of the year-end doubles championships, and was part of the 1983 Virginia Slims World Championship Series. The tournament was held from March 14 through March 20, 1983. First-seeded Martina Navratilova won the singles event and the accompanying $80,000 first prize money.

== Finals ==
=== Singles ===
(United States) Martina Navratilova defeated (United States) Chris Evert-Lloyd, 6–2, 6–0

- It was Navratilova's 9th title of the year and the 156th of her career.

=== Doubles ===
(United States) Martina Navratilova / (United States) Pam Shriver defeated (West Germany) Claudia Kohde-Kilsch / (West Germany) Eva Pfaff, 7–5, 6–2

- It was Navratilova's 10th title of the year and the 157th of her career. It was Shriver's 5th title of the year and the 39th of her career.

== See also ==
- Evert–Navratilova rivalry
