= 1996 WTA Tour Championships – Doubles =

Doubles
- 1996 WTA Tour Championships

Final
- Champions: (United States) Lindsay Davenport (United States) Mary Joe Fernández
- Runners-up: (Czech Republic) Jana Novotná (Spain) Arantxa Sánchez Vicario
- Score: 6–3, 6–2

Details
- Draw: 8
- Seeds: 4

Events
Singles	Doubles
← 1995 ·	WTA Tour Championships	· 1997 →

Lindsay Davenport and Mary Joe Fernández defeated the defending champions Jana Novotná and Arantxa Sánchez Vicario in the final, 6–3, 6–2 to win the doubles tennis title at the 1996 WTA Tour Championships.

== Seeds ==
Champion seeds are indicated in bold text while text in italics indicates the round in which those seeds were eliminated.

1. (Czech Republic) Jana Novotná / (Spain) Arantxa Sánchez Vicario (final)
2. (United States) Gigi Fernández / (Belarus) Natasha Zvereva (semifinals)
3. (United States) **Lindsay Davenport** / (United States) **Mary Joe Fernández (champions)**
4. (United States) Meredith McGrath / (Latvia) Larisa Neiland (semifinals)

== Draw ==
=== Key ===
- Q = Qualifier
- WC = Wild card
- LL = Lucky loser
- Alt = Alternate
- SE = Special exempt
- PR = Protected ranking
- ITF = ITF entry
- JE = Junior exempt
- w/o = Walkover
- r = Retired
- d = Defaulted
- SR = Special ranking

Quarterfinals
1	(Czech Republic) **Jana Novotná** (Spain) **Arantxa Sánchez Vicario**	**6**	3	**7**
(Switzerland) Martina Hingis (Czech Republic) Helena Suková	4	**6**	5
4	(United States) **Meredith McGrath** (Latvia) **Larisa Neiland**	**6**	6	**6**
(Indonesia) Yayuk Basuki (Netherlands) Caroline Vis	4	**7**	4
(United States) Lisa Raymond (Australia) Rennae Stubbs	2	2
3	(United States) **Lindsay Davenport** (United States) **Mary Joe Fernández**	**6**	**6**
(Australia) Elizabeth Smylie (United States) Linda Wild	1	2
2	(United States) **Gigi Fernández** (Belarus) **Natasha Zvereva**	**6**	**6**

Semifinals
1	(Czech Republic) **Jana Novotná** (Spain) **Arantxa Sánchez Vicario**	**6**	**6**
4	(United States) Meredith McGrath (Latvia) Larisa Neiland	2	2
3	(United States) **Lindsay Davenport** (United States) **Mary Joe Fernández**	**7**	**6**
2	(United States) Gigi Fernández (Belarus) Natasha Zvereva	6	3

Final
1	(Czech Republic) Jana Novotná (Spain) Arantxa Sánchez Vicario	3	2
3	(United States) **Lindsay Davenport** (United States) **Mary Joe Fernández**	**6**	**6**
