= 1987 Virginia Slims Championships – Doubles =

Doubles
- 1987 Virginia Slims Championships

Final
- Champions: (United States) Martina Navratilova (United States) Pam Shriver
- Runners-up: (West Germany) Claudia Kohde-Kilsch (Czechoslovakia) Helena Suková
- Score: 6–1, 6–1

Details
- Draw: 8
- Seeds: 4

Events
Singles	Doubles
← 1986 ·	WTA Tour Championships	· 1988 →

Defending champions Martina Navratilova and Pam Shriver defeated Claudia Kohde-Kilsch and Helena Suková in the final, 6–1, 6–1 to win the doubles tennis title at the 1987 Virginia Slims Championships. It was Navratilova's tenth Tour Finals doubles title, and Shriver's seventh.

== Seeds ==
1. (United States) Martina Navratilova / (United States) Pam Shriver (champions)
2. (West Germany) Claudia Kohde-Kilsch / (Czechoslovakia) Helena Suková (final)
3. (United States) Zina Garrison / (United States) Lori McNeil (quarterfinals)
4. (West Germany) Steffi Graf / (Argentina) Gabriela Sabatini (semifinals)

== Draw ==
=== Key ===
- Q = Qualifier
- WC = Wild card
- LL = Lucky loser
- Alt = Alternate
- SE = Special exempt
- PR = Protected ranking
- ITF = ITF entry
- JE = Junior exempt
- w/o = Walkover
- r = Retired
- d = Defaulted
- SR = Special ranking

=== Draw ===
Quarterfinals
1	(United States) Martina Navratilova (United States) Pam Shriver	7	5	6
(Czechoslovakia) Jana Novotná (France) Catherine Suire	6	7	4
4	(West Germany) Steffi Graf (Argentina) Gabriela Sabatini	6	6
(Soviet Union) Svetlana Parkhomenko (Soviet Union) Larisa Savchenko	1	4
(United States) Elise Burgin (South Africa) Rosalyn Fairbank	2	6	6
3	(United States) Zina Garrison (United States) Lori McNeil	6	2	1
(United States) Mary-Lou Daniels (United States) Anne White	4	6	5
2	(West Germany) Claudia Kohde-Kilsch (Czechoslovakia) Helena Suková	6	3	7

Semifinals
1	(United States) Martina Navratilova (United States) Pam Shriver	3	7	6
4	(West Germany) Steffi Graf (Argentina) Gabriela Sabatini	6	6	1
(United States) Elise Burgin (South Africa) Rosalyn Fairbank	2	3
2	(West Germany) Claudia Kohde-Kilsch (Czechoslovakia) Helena Suková	6	6

Final
1	(United States) Martina Navratilova (United States) Pam Shriver	6	6
2	(West Germany) Claudia Kohde-Kilsch (Czechoslovakia) Helena Suková	1	1
