= 1983 Virginia Slims Championships – Doubles =

Doubles
- 1983 Virginia Slims Championships

Final
- Champions: (United States) Martina Navratilova (United States) Pam Shriver
- Runners-up: (West Germany) Claudia Kohde-Kilsch (West Germany) Eva Pfaff
- Score: 7–5, 6–2

Events
Singles	Doubles
← 1982 ·	WTA Tour Championships	· 1984 →

Two-time defending champions Martina Navratilova and Pam Shriver defeated Claudia Kohde-Kilsch and Eva Pfaff in the final, 7–5, 6–2 to win the doubles tennis title at the 1983 Virginia Slims Championships. It was Navratilova's sixth Tour Finals doubles title, and Shriver's third.

== Seeds ==
Champion seeds are indicated in bold text while text in italics indicates the round in which those seeds were eliminated. The top two seeded teams received byes into the semifinals.

1. (United States) **Martina Navratilova** / (United States) **Pam Shriver (champions)**
2. (United States) Kathy Jordan / (United States) Anne Smith (semifinals)
3. (United States) Rosemary Casals / (Australia) Wendy Turnbull (quarterfinals)
4. (United States) Barbara Potter / (United States) Sharon Walsh (quarterfinals)
5. (West Germany) Claudia Kohde-Kilsch / (West Germany) Eva Pfaff (final)
6. (United States) Billie Jean King / (United States) Candy Reynolds (semifinals)

== Draw ==
=== Key ===
- Q = Qualifier
- WC = Wild card
- LL = Lucky loser
- Alt = Alternate
- SE = Special exempt
- PR = Protected ranking
- ITF = ITF entry
- JE = Junior exempt
- w/o = Walkover
- r = Retired
- d = Defaulted
- SR = Special ranking

Quarterfinals
1	(United States) **Martina Navratilova** (United States) **Pam Shriver**
BYE
3	(United States) Rosemary Casals (Australia) Wendy Turnbull	6	2
6	(United States) **Billie Jean King** (United States) **Candy Reynolds**	**7**	**6**
5	(West Germany) **Claudia Kohde-Kilsch** (West Germany) **Eva Pfaff**	**7**	3	**6**
4	(United States) Barbara Potter (United States) Sharon Walsh	6	**6**	3
BYE
2	(United States) **Kathy Jordan** (United States) **Anne Smith**

Semifinals
1	(United States) **Martina Navratilova** (United States) **Pam Shriver**	**6**	**6**
6	(United States) Billie Jean King (United States) Candy Reynolds	2	4
5	(West Germany) **Claudia Kohde-Kilsch** (West Germany) **Eva Pfaff**	4	**6**	**6**
2	(United States) Kathy Jordan (United States) Anne Smith	**6**	3	2

Final
1	(United States) **Martina Navratilova** (United States) **Pam Shriver**	**7**	**6**
5	(West Germany) Claudia Kohde-Kilsch (West Germany) Eva Pfaff	5	2
