= 1977 Virginia Slims Championships =

- Date: March 24–27
- Edition: 6th
- Category: Virginia Slims Championships
- Draw: 8S (RR)
- Prize money: $150,000
- Surface: Carpet / indoor
- Location: New York City, United States
- Venue: Madison Square Garden

Champions

Singles
- (United States) Chris Evert
← 1976 ·	Virginia Slims Championships	· 1978 →

The 1977 Virginia Slims Championships were the sixth season-ending WTA Tour Championships, the annual tennis tournament for the best female tennis players in singles on the 1977 WTA Tour. The event consisted of two round robin groups (Gold and Orange) of four players each. The winners of each group played each other in the final and additionally there was a play-off match for third place. The tournament was played on indoor carpet courts and was held from March 24 to March 27, 1977 in Madison Square Garden in New York City. First-seeded Chris Evert won the singles event and the accompanying $50,000 first prize money.

The doubles tournament was held separately in Tokyo, Japan as the third edition of the WTA Doubles Championships.

== Final ==
=== Singles ===
(United States) Chris Evert defeated (United Kingdom) Sue Barker, 2–6, 6–1, 6–1.

- It was Evert's 6th singles title of the year and the 73rd of her career.

== See also ==
- 1977 Colgate Series Championships
