= 1986 Virginia Slims Championships (March) – Doubles =

Doubles
- 1986 Virginia Slims Championships (March)

Final
- Champions: (Czechoslovakia) Hana Mandlíková (Australia) Wendy Turnbull
- Runners-up: (West Germany) Claudia Kohde-Kilsch (Czechoslovakia) Helena Suková
- Score: 6–4, 6–7^{(4–7)}, 6–3

Details
- Draw: 8
- Seeds: 4

Events
Singles	Doubles
← 1985 ·	WTA Tour Championships	· 1986 →

Hana Mandlíková and Wendy Turnbull defeated Claudia Kohde-Kilsch and Helena Suková in the final, 6–4, 6–7^{(4–7)}, 6–3 to win the doubles tennis title at the March edition of the 1986 Virginia Slims Championships.

Martina Navratilova and Pam Shriver were the five-time defending champions, but were defeated in the semifinals by Mandlíková and Turnbull.

== Seeds ==
1. (United States) Martina Navratilova / (United States) Pam Shriver (semifinals)
2. (West Germany) Claudia Kohde-Kilsch / (Czechoslovakia) Helena Suková (final)
3. (Czechoslovakia) Hana Mandlíková / (Australia) Wendy Turnbull (champions)
4. (United States) Kathy Jordan / (Australia) Elizabeth Smylie (quarterfinals)

== Draw ==
=== Key ===
- Q = Qualifier
- WC = Wild card
- LL = Lucky loser
- Alt = Alternate
- SE = Special exempt
- PR = Protected ranking
- ITF = ITF entry
- JE = Junior exempt
- w/o = Walkover
- r = Retired
- d = Defaulted
- SR = Special ranking

=== Draw ===
Quarterfinals
1	(United States) Martina Navratilova (United States) Pam Shriver	6	6
(Bulgaria) Katerina Maleeva (Bulgaria) Manuela Maleeva	1	0
3	(Czechoslovakia) Hana Mandlíková (Australia) Wendy Turnbull	6	6
(United States) Gigi Fernández (United States) Robin White	4	3
(Soviet Union) Svetlana Parkhomenko (Soviet Union) Larisa Savchenko	7	2	6
4	(United States) Kathy Jordan (Australia) Elizabeth Smylie	5	6	2
(West Germany) Bettina Bunge (West Germany) Eva Pfaff	2	3
2	(West Germany) Claudia Kohde-Kilsch (Czechoslovakia) Helena Suková	6	6

Semifinals
1	(United States) Martina Navratilova (United States) Pam Shriver	6	3	4
3	(Czechoslovakia) Hana Mandlíková (Australia) Wendy Turnbull	4	6	6
(Soviet Union) Svetlana Parkhomenko (Soviet Union) Larisa Savchenko	5	1
2	(West Germany) Claudia Kohde-Kilsch (Czechoslovakia) Helena Suková	7	6

Final
3	(Czechoslovakia) Hana Mandlíková (Australia) Wendy Turnbull	6	6^{4}	6
2	(West Germany) Claudia Kohde-Kilsch (Czechoslovakia) Helena Suková	4	7^{7}	3
