= 1976 Virginia Slims Championships =

- Date: April 12–17
- Edition: 5th
- Category: Virginia Slims Championships
- Draw: 16S (8RR)
- Prize money: $150,000
- Surface: Carpet (i)
- Location: Los Angeles, United States
- Venue: Los Angeles Sports Arena

Champions

Singles
- (Australia) Evonne Goolagong
← 1975 ·	Virginia Slims Championships	· 1977 →

The 1976 Virginia Slims Championships were the fifth season-ending WTA Tour Championships, the annual tennis tournament for the best female tennis players in singles on the 1976 Virginia Slims circuit. The 16 best players, based on points average, qualified for the tournament provided they had played at least six tournaments. The singles event consisted of an elimination round and the eight winners were subsequently divided over two round robin groups (Gold and Orange). The winners of each group played each other in the final and additionally there were play-off matches for third, fifth and seventh place. The tournament was held from April 12 through April 17, 1976 at the Los Angeles Sports Arena. Evonne Goolagong won the singles event and the accompanying $40,000 first prize money.

The doubles tournament was held separately in Osaka and Tokyo, Japan as the second edition of the WTA Doubles Championships.

== Final ==
=== Singles ===
(Australia) Evonne Goolagong defeated (United States) Chris Evert, 6–3, 5–7, 6–3.
