= 1993 Virginia Slims Championships – Singles =

Singles
- 1993 Virginia Slims Championships

Final
- Champion: (Germany) Steffi Graf
- Runner-up: (Spain) Arantxa Sánchez Vicario
- Score: 6–1, 6–4, 3–6, 6–1

Details
- Draw: 16
- Seeds: 8

Events
Singles	Doubles
- Virginia Slims Championships

Steffi Graf defeated Arantxa Sánchez Vicario in the final, 6–1, 6–4, 3–6, 6–1 to win the singles tennis title at the 1993 Virginia Slims Championships.

Monica Seles was the three-time defending champion, but did not participate this year due to her stabbing that April.

== Seeds ==
1. (Germany) Steffi Graf (champion)
2. (Spain) Arantxa Sánchez Vicario (final)
3. (United States) Martina Navratilova (quarterfinals)
4. (Spain) Conchita Martínez (quarterfinals)
5. (Argentina) Gabriela Sabatini (first round)
6. (United States) Mary Joe Fernandez (first round)
7. (Czech Republic) Jana Novotná (quarterfinals)
8. (Germany) Anke Huber (semifinals)

Note

- (Federal Republic of Yugoslavia) Monica Seles had qualified but withdrew due to back stab received during Hamburg tournament
- (United States) Jennifer Capriati had qualified but withdrew due to temporal break from competitive tennis

== Draw ==
Key

- Q = Qualifier
- WC = Wild card
- LL = Lucky loser
- Alt = Alternate
- ITF = ITF entry
- PR = Protected ranking
- SR = Special ranking
- SE = Special exempt
- JE = Junior exempt
- JR = Junior Accelerator Programme entrant
- CO = College Accelerator Programme entrant
- NG = Next Gen Accelerator Program entrant
- w/o = Walkover
- r = Retired
- d = Defaulted

=== Finals ===
- NB: The final was the best of 5 sets while all other rounds were the best of 3 sets.

First round
1	(Germany) S Graf	6	6
(Belarus) N Zvereva	2	4
(South Africa) A Coetzer	6	1	6
6	(United States) MJ Fernandez	1	6	3
4	(Spain) C Martínez	7	6
(Switzerland) M Maleeva-Fragnière	5	2
(Bulgaria) M Maleeva	4	6	6^{5}
8	(Germany) A Huber	6	1	7^{7}
5	(Argentina) G Sabatini	6^{8}	3
(France) M Pierce	7^{10}	6
(France) N Tauziat	4	4
3	(United States) M Navratilova	6	6
7	(Czech Republic) J Novotná	6	6^{5}	6
(United States) Z Garrison	4	7^{7}	3
(Czech Republic) H Suková	5	2
2	(Spain) A Sánchez Vicario	7	6

Quarterfinals
1	(Germany) S Graf	6	6
(South Africa) A Coetzer	1	2
4	(Spain) C Martínez	3	3
8	(Germany) A Huber	6	6
(France) M Pierce	6	3	6
3	(United States) M Navratilova	1	6	4
7	(Czech Republic) J Novotná	7^{7}	6^{5}	4
2	(Spain) A Sánchez Vicario	6^{2}	7^{7}	6

Semifinals
1	(Germany) S Graf	6	3	6
8	(Germany) A Huber	2	6	3
(France) M Pierce	2	7	2
2	(Spain) A Sánchez Vicario	6	5	6

Final
1	(Germany) S Graf	6	6	3	6
2	(Spain) A Sánchez Vicario	1	4	6	1

== See also ==
- WTA Tour Championships appearances
