= 1986 Virginia Slims Championships (November) – Doubles =

Doubles
- 1986 Virginia Slims Championships (November)

Final
- Champions: (United States) Martina Navratilova (United States) Pam Shriver
- Runners-up: (West Germany) Claudia Kohde-Kilsch (Czechoslovakia) Helena Suková
- Score: 7–6^{(6–1)}, 6–3

Events
Singles	Doubles
← 1986 ·	WTA Tour Championships	· 1987 →

Martina Navratilova and Pam Shriver defeated Claudia Kohde-Kilsch and Helena Suková in the final, 7–6^{(6–1)}, 6–3 to win the doubles tennis title at the November edition of the 1986 Virginia Slims Championships. It was Navratilova's ninth Tour Finals doubles title, and Shriver's sixth.

Hana Mandlíková and Wendy Turnbull were the defending champions, but were defeated in the semifinals by Navratilova and Shriver.

== Seeds ==
1. (United States) Martina Navratilova / (United States) Pam Shriver (champions)
2. (West Germany) Claudia Kohde-Kilsch / (Czechoslovakia) Helena Suková (final)
3. (West Germany) Steffi Graf / (Argentina) Gabriela Sabatini (semifinals)
4. (Czechoslovakia) Hana Mandlíková / (Australia) Wendy Turnbull (semifinals)

== Draw ==
=== Key ===
- Q = Qualifier
- WC = Wild card
- LL = Lucky loser
- Alt = Alternate
- SE = Special exempt
- PR = Protected ranking
- ITF = ITF entry
- JE = Junior exempt
- w/o = Walkover
- r = Retired
- d = Defaulted
- SR = Special ranking

=== Draw ===
Quarterfinals
1	(United States) Martina Navratilova (United States) Pam Shriver	6	6
(Bulgaria) Katerina Maleeva (Bulgaria) Manuela Maleeva	1	0
(United States) Elise Burgin (South Africa) Rosalyn Fairbank	2	4
4	(Czechoslovakia) Hana Mandlíková (Australia) Wendy Turnbull	6	6
3	(West Germany) Steffi Graf (Argentina) Gabriela Sabatini	6	6
(United States) Gigi Fernández (United States) Robin White	3	2
(Soviet Union) Svetlana Parkhomenko (Soviet Union) Larisa Savchenko	6	6^{5}	2
2	(West Germany) Claudia Kohde-Kilsch (Czechoslovakia) Helena Suková	2	7^{7}	6

Semifinals
1	(United States) Martina Navratilova (United States) Pam Shriver	1	6	6
4	(Czechoslovakia) Hana Mandlíková (Australia) Wendy Turnbull	6	1	1
3	(West Germany) Steffi Graf (Argentina) Gabriela Sabatini	6^{8}	6	5
2	(West Germany) Claudia Kohde-Kilsch (Czechoslovakia) Helena Suková	7^{10}	3	7

Final
1	(United States) Martina Navratilova (United States) Pam Shriver	7^{7}	6
2	(West Germany) Claudia Kohde-Kilsch (Czechoslovakia) Helena Suková	6^{1}	3
