= 1995 WTA Tour Championships – Doubles =

Doubles
- 1995 WTA Tour Championships

Final
- Champions: (Czech Republic) Jana Novotná (Spain) Arantxa Sánchez Vicario
- Runners-up: (United States) Gigi Fernández (Belarus) Natasha Zvereva
- Score: 6–2, 6–1

Details
- Draw: 9
- Seeds: 4

Events
Singles	Doubles
← 1994 ·	WTA Tour Championships	· 1996 →

Jana Novotná and Arantxa Sánchez Vicario defeated the two-time defending champions Gigi Fernández and Natasha Zvereva in a rematch of the previous year's final, 6–2, 6–1 to win the doubles tennis title at the 1995 WTA Tour Championships. It was Novotná's second Tour Finals doubles title and Sánchez Vicario's first.

== Seeds ==
Champion seeds are indicated in bold text while text in italics indicates the round in which those seeds were eliminated.

1. (United States) Gigi Fernández / (Belarus) Natasha Zvereva (final)
2. (Czech Republic) **Jana Novotná / (Spain) Arantxa Sánchez Vicario (champions)**
3. (United States) Meredith McGrath / (Latvia) Larisa Neiland (semifinals)
4. (United States) Nicole Arendt / (Netherlands) Manon Bollegraf (semifinals)

== Draw ==
=== Key ===
- Q = Qualifier
- WC = Wild card
- LL = Lucky loser
- Alt = Alternate
- SE = Special exempt
- PR = Protected ranking
- ITF = ITF entry
- JE = Junior exempt
- w/o = Walkover
- r = Retired
- d = Defaulted
- SR = Special ranking

First round
**(Argentina) Gabriela Sabatini** **(Netherlands) Brenda Schultz-McCarthy**	**6**	**6**
(France) Julie Halard-Decugis (France) Nathalie Tauziat	4	4

Quarterfinals
1	(United States) **Gigi Fernández** (Belarus) **Natasha Zvereva**	**7^{7}**	**6**
(United States) Katrina Adams (United States) Zina Garrison	6^{4}	1
(Argentina) Gabriela Sabatini (Netherlands) Brenda Schultz-McCarthy	3	2
3	(United States) **Meredith McGrath** (Latvia) **Larisa Neiland**	**6**	**6**
4	(United States) **Nicole Arendt** (Netherlands) **Manon Bollegraf**	**7^{7}**	**6**
(United States) Lori McNeil (Czech Republic) Helena Suková	6^{3}	3
(Spain) Conchita Martínez (Argentina) Patricia Tarabini	3	0
2	(Czech Republic) **Jana Novotná** (Spain) **Arantxa Sánchez Vicario**	**6**	**6**

Semifinals
1	(United States) **Gigi Fernández** (Belarus) **Natasha Zvereva**	**6**	**6**
3	(United States) Meredith McGrath (Latvia) Larisa Neiland	4	2
4	(United States) Nicole Arendt (Netherlands) Manon Bollegraf	6^{7}	**6**	2
2	(Czech Republic) **Jana Novotná** (Spain) **Arantxa Sánchez Vicario**	**7^{9}**	2	**6**

Final
1	(United States) Gigi Fernández (Belarus) Natasha Zvereva	2	1
2	(Czech Republic) **Jana Novotná** (Spain) **Arantxa Sánchez Vicario**	**6**	**6**
