= 1974 Virginia Slims Championships =

- Date: October 14–19
- Edition: 3rd
- Category: Virginia Slims Championships
- Draw: 16S / 4D
- Prize money: $100,000
- Surface: Carpet / indoor
- Location: Los Angeles, United States
- Venue: Los Angeles Sports Arena

Champions

Singles
- (Australia) Evonne Goolagong

Doubles
- (United States) Rosemary Casals / (United States) Billie Jean King
| ← 1973 · | Virginia Slims Championships | · 1975 → |

The 1974 Virginia Slims Championships were the third season-ending WTA Tour Championships, the annual tennis tournament for the best female tennis players in singles on the 1974 Virginia Slims circuit. It was held on indoor carpet courts from October 14 through October 19, 1974 at the Los Angeles Sports Arena in Los Angeles, United States. The 16 best performers of the circuit qualified for the championship as well as the four best doubles teams. Third-seeded Evonne Goolagong won the singles title and the accompanying $32,000 first prize.

== Finals ==
=== Singles ===
(Australia) Evonne Goolagong defeated (United States) Chris Evert, 6–3, 6–4

=== Doubles ===
(United States) Rosemary Casals / (United States) Billie Jean King defeated (France) Françoise Dürr / (Netherlands) Betty Stöve, 6–1, 6–7^{(2–7)}, 7–5
