= 1985 Virginia Slims Championships – Doubles =

Doubles
- 1985 Virginia Slims Championships

Final
- Champions: (United States) Martina Navratilova (United States) Pam Shriver
- Runners-up: (West Germany) Claudia Kohde-Kilsch (Czechoslovakia) Helena Suková
- Score: 6–7, 6–4, 7–6

Details
- Draw: 8
- Seeds: 4

Events
Singles	Doubles
← 1984 ·	WTA Tour Championships	· 1986 →

Four-time defending champions Martina Navratilova and Pam Shriver defeated Claudia Kohde-Kilsch and Helena Suková in the final, 6–7, 6–4, 7–6 to win the doubles tennis title at the 1985 Virginia Slims Championships. It was Navratilova's eighth Tour Finals doubles title, and Shriver's fifth.

== Seeds ==
1. (United States) Martina Navratilova / (United States) Pam Shriver (champions)
2. (West Germany) Claudia Kohde-Kilsch / (Czechoslovakia) Helena Suková (final)
3. (United States) Barbara Potter / (United States) Sharon Walsh-Pete (semifinals)
4. (South Africa) Rosalyn Fairbank / (United States) Candy Reynolds (semifinals)

== Draw ==
=== Key ===
- Q = Qualifier
- WC = Wild card
- LL = Lucky loser
- Alt = Alternate
- SE = Special exempt
- PR = Protected ranking
- ITF = ITF entry
- JE = Junior exempt
- w/o = Walkover
- r = Retired
- d = Defaulted
- SR = Special ranking

=== Draw ===
Quarterfinals
1	(United States) Martina Navratilova (United States) Pam Shriver	6	6
(United States) Kathleen Horvath (Romania) Virginia Ruzici	3	1
(United States) Alycia Moulton (United States) Paula Smith	2	6	1
4	(South Africa) Rosalyn Fairbank (United States) Candy Reynolds	6	4	6
3	(United States) Barbara Potter (United States) Sharon Walsh-Pete	3	7	7
(United Kingdom) Jo Durie (United States) Ann Kiyomura	6	6	6
(Switzerland) Christiane Jolissaint (Netherlands) Marcella Mesker	3	6
2	(West Germany) Claudia Kohde-Kilsch (Czechoslovakia) Helena Suková	6	7

Semifinals
1	(United States) Martina Navratilova (United States) Pam Shriver	6	6
4	(South Africa) Rosalyn Fairbank (United States) Candy Reynolds	0	3
3	(United States) Barbara Potter (United States) Sharon Walsh-Pete	3	2
2	(West Germany) Claudia Kohde-Kilsch (Czechoslovakia) Helena Suková	6	6

Final
1	(United States) Martina Navratilova (United States) Pam Shriver	6	6	7
2	(West Germany) Claudia Kohde-Kilsch (Czechoslovakia) Helena Suková	7	4	6
