= 1998 Chase Championships =

- Date: November 16–22
- Edition: 28th (singles) / 27th (doubles)
- Category: Year-end championships
- Draw: 16S/8D
- Prize money: $2,000,000
- Surface: Carpet / indoor
- Location: New York City, United States
- Venue: Madison Square Garden

Champions

Singles
- (Switzerland) Martina Hingis

Doubles
- (United States) Lindsay Davenport / (Belarus) Natasha Zvereva
← 1997 ·	WTA Finals	· 1999 →

The 1998 Chase Championships was a women's tennis tournament played on indoor carpet courts at Madison Square Garden in New York City, New York in the United States. It was the 27th edition of the year-end singles championships, the 23rd edition of the year-end doubles championships, and was part of the 1998 WTA Tour. The tournament was held from November 16 through November 22, 1998. Martina Hingis won the singles title and earned $500,000 first-prize money. It was the last edition of the tournament to be played in the best-of-five-set format for the final which it had used since 1984.

== Finals ==
=== Singles ===
(Switzerland) Martina Hingis defeated (United States) Lindsay Davenport, 7–5, 6–4, 4–6, 6–2.

- It was Hingis' 14th title of the year and the 39th of her career.

=== Doubles ===
(United States) Lindsay Davenport / (Belarus) Natasha Zvereva defeated (France) Alexandra Fusai / (France) Nathalie Tauziat, 6–7^{(6–8)}, 7–5, 6–3.

- It was Davenport's 12th title of the year and the 43rd of her career. It was Zvereva's 8th title of the year and the 81st of her career.
