= 2001 WTA Tour Championships =

- Date: 30 October – 4 November
- Edition: 31st
- Category: Year-end championships
- Draw: 16S / 8D
- Prize money: $3,000,000
- Surface: Carpet / indoor
- Location: Munich, Germany
- Venue: Olympiahalle

Champions

Singles
- (United States) Serena Williams

Doubles
- (United States) Lisa Raymond / (Australia) Rennae Stubbs
← 2000 ·	WTA Finals	· 2002 →

The 2001 WTA Tour Championships, also known by its sponsored name Sanex Championships, was a women's tennis tournament played on indoor carpet courts at the Olympiahalle in Munich, Germany. It was the 31st edition of the year-end singles championships, the 26th edition of the year-end doubles championships, and was part of the 2001 WTA Tour. The tournament was held between 30 October and 4 November 2001. Seventh-seeded Serena Williams won the singles event after Lindsay Davenport defaulted the final due to a knee injury she sustained in her semifinal match. Davenport's semifinal win ensured her the No.1 year-end ranking. Williams earned $500,000 first-prize money as well as 390 ranking points.

Venus Williams and Martina Hingis had qualified for the tournament but withdrew due to injuries while Monica Seles refused to play in Germany, the country where she was stabbed in 1993.

== Finals ==
=== Singles ===
(United States) Serena Williams defeated (United States) Lindsay Davenport, walkover.

- It was Williams's 1st WTA Championships title.

=== Doubles ===
(United States) Lisa Raymond / (Australia) Rennae Stubbs defeated (Zimbabwe) Cara Black / (Russia) Elena Likhovtseva, 7–5, 3–6, 6–3.
