= 1984 Virginia Slims Championships – Doubles =

Doubles
- 1984 Virginia Slims Championships

Final
- Champions: (United States) Martina Navratilova (United States) Pam Shriver
- Runners-up: (United Kingdom) Jo Durie (United States) Ann Kiyomura
- Score: 6–3, 6–1

Details
- Draw: 8
- Seeds: 4

Events
Singles	Doubles
← 1983 ·	WTA Tour Championships	· 1985 →

Three-time defending champions Martina Navratilova and Pam Shriver defeated Jo Durie and Ann Kiyomura in the final, 6–3, 6–1 to win the doubles tennis title at the 1984 Virginia Slims Championships. It was Navratilova's seventh Tour Finals doubles title, and Shriver's fourth.

== Seeds ==
1. (United States) Martina Navratilova / (United States) Pam Shriver (champions)
2. (United States) Billie Jean King / (United States) Sharon Walsh (semifinals)
3. (South Africa) Rosalyn Fairbank / (United States) Candy Reynolds (semifinals)
4. (United States) Kathy Jordan / (United States) Anne Smith (quarterfinals)

== Draw ==
=== Key ===
- Q = Qualifier
- WC = Wild card
- LL = Lucky loser
- Alt = Alternate
- SE = Special exempt
- PR = Protected ranking
- ITF = ITF entry
- JE = Junior exempt
- w/o = Walkover
- r = Retired
- d = Defaulted
- SR = Special ranking

=== Draw ===
Quarterfinals
1	(United States) Martina Navratilova (United States) Pam Shriver	6	6
(United States) Lea Antonoplis (United States) Barbara Jordan	3	0
(Australia) Chris O'Neil (Australia) Pam Whytcross	2	6
3	(South Africa) Rosalyn Fairbank (United States) Candy Reynolds	6	7
4	(United States) Kathy Jordan (United States) Anne Smith	5	3
(United Kingdom) Jo Durie (United States) Ann Kiyomura	7	6
(United States) Rosemary Casals (Australia) Wendy Turnbull	6	6	3
2	(United States) Billie Jean King (United States) Sharon Walsh	7	4	6

Semifinals
1	(United States) Martina Navratilova (United States) Pam Shriver	6	6
3	(South Africa) Rosalyn Fairbank (United States) Candy Reynolds	4	2
(United Kingdom) Jo Durie (United States) Ann Kiyomura	6	7
2	(United States) Billie Jean King (United States) Sharon Walsh	3	5

Final
1	(United States) Martina Navratilova (United States) Pam Shriver	6	6
(United Kingdom) Jo Durie (United States) Ann Kiyomura	3	1
