= 1987 Virginia Slims Championships =

- Date: November 16–23
- Edition: 17th
- Draw: 16S / 8D
- Prize money: $1,000,000
- Surface: Carpet (indoors)
- Location: New York City, New York
- Venue: Madison Square Garden

Champions

Singles
- (West Germany) Steffi Graf

Doubles
- (United States) Martina Navratilova / (United States) Pam Shriver
← 1986 ·	Virginia Slims Championships	· 1988 →

The 1987 Virginia Slims Championships were the seventeenth WTA Tour Championships, the annual tennis tournament for the best female tennis players in singles on the 1987 WTA Tour. It was held from November 16 through November 23, 1987 and played on indoor carpet courts, in Madison Square Garden in New York City, New York. First-seeded Steffi Graf won the singles title and earned $125,000 first-prize money.

== Finals ==
=== Singles ===
(West Germany) Steffi Graf defeated (Argentina) Gabriela Sabatini, 4–6, 6–4, 6–0, 6–4

- It was Graf's 11th singles title of the year and the 19th of her career.

=== Doubles ===
(United States) Martina Navratilova / (United States) Pam Shriver defeated (West Germany) Claudia Kohde-Kilsch / (Czechoslovakia) Helena Suková, 6–1, 6–1
