= 2000 WTA Tour Championships – Doubles =

Doubles
- 2000 WTA Tour Championships

Final
- Champions: (Switzerland) Martina Hingis (Russia) Anna Kournikova
- Runners-up: (United States) Nicole Arendt (Netherlands) Manon Bollegraf
- Score: 6–2, 6–3

Details
- Draw: 8
- Seeds: 4

Events
Singles	Doubles
← 1999 ·	WTA Tour Championships	· 2001 →

Defending champions Martina Hingis and Anna Kournikova defeated Nicole Arendt and Manon Bollegraf in the final, 6–2, 6–3 to win the doubles tennis title at the 2000 WTA Tour Championships. It was the last tournament in which Hingis and Kournikova played as a pair, before splitting at the beginning of the following season.

== Seeds ==
1. (France) Julie Halard-Decugis / (Japan) Ai Sugiyama (first round)
2. (Switzerland) Martina Hingis / (Russia) Anna Kournikova (champions)
3. (United States) Lisa Raymond / (Australia) Rennae Stubbs (semifinals)
4. (Spain) Virginia Ruano Pascual / (Argentina) Paola Suárez (first round)

== Draw ==
=== Key ===
- Q = Qualifier
- WC = Wild card
- LL = Lucky loser
- Alt = Alternate
- SE = Special exempt
- PR = Protected ranking
- ITF = ITF entry
- JE = Junior exempt
- w/o = Walkover
- r = Retired
- d = Defaulted
- SR = Special ranking

=== Finals ===
First round
1	(France) Julie Halard-Decugis (Japan) Ai Sugiyama	6	3	4
(Belgium) Els Callens (Belgium) Dominique Van Roost	2	6	6
4	(Spain) Virginia Ruano Pascual (Argentina) Paola Suárez	4	2
(United States) Nicole Arendt (Netherlands) Manon Bollegraf	6	6
(France) Alexandra Fusai (France) Nathalie Tauziat	4	6^{5}
3	(United States) Lisa Raymond (Australia) Rennae Stubbs	6	7^{7}
(Zimbabwe) Cara Black (Russia) Elena Likhovtseva	0	5
2	(Switzerland) Martina Hingis (Russia) Anna Kournikova	6	7

Semifinals
(Belgium) Els Callens (Belgium) Dominique Van Roost	5	4
(United States) Nicole Arendt (Netherlands) Manon Bollegraf	7	6
3	(United States) Lisa Raymond (Australia) Rennae Stubbs	4	2
2	(Switzerland) Martina Hingis (Russia) Anna Kournikova	6	6

Finals
(United States) Nicole Arendt (Netherlands) Manon Bollegraf	2	3
2	(Switzerland) Martina Hingis (Russia) Anna Kournikova	6	6
