= 1996 Chase Championships =

- Date: November 18–24
- Edition: 26th (singles) / 25th (doubles)
- Category: WTA Finals
- Draw: 16S / 8D
- Prize money: $2,000,000
- Surface: Carpet / indoor
- Location: New York City, U.S.
- Venue: Madison Square Garden

Champions

Singles
- (Germany) Steffi Graf

Doubles
- (United States) Lindsay Davenport / (United States) Mary Joe Fernández
← 1995 ·	WTA Finals	· 1997 →

The 1996 Chase Championships was a women's tennis tournament played on indoor carpet courts at Madison Square Garden in New York City, New York in the United States. It was the 25th edition of the year-end singles championships, the 21st edition of the year-end doubles championships, and was part of the 1996 WTA Tour. The tournament was held from November 18 through November 24, 1996. First-seeded Steffi Graf won the singles title after defeating Martina Hingis in the final, which was the last women's match played over five sets.

== Finals ==
=== Singles ===
(Germany) Steffi Graf defeated (Switzerland) Martina Hingis, 6–3, 4–6, 6–0, 4–6, 6–0.

- It was Graf's 7th singles title of the year and the 102nd of her career.

=== Doubles ===
(United States) Lindsay Davenport / (United States) Mary Joe Fernández defeated (Czech Republic) Jana Novotná / (Spain) Arantxa Sánchez Vicario, 6–3, 6–2.

- It was Davenport's 8th title of the year and the 18th of her career. It was Fernández's 5th title of the year and the 23rd of her career.
