= 1982 Avon Championships – Doubles =

Doubles
- 1982 Avon Championships

Final
- Champions: (United States) Martina Navratilova (United States) Pam Shriver
- Runners-up: (United States) Kathy Jordan (United States) Anne Smith
- Score: 6–4, 6–3

Details
- Draw: 4

Events
Singles	Doubles
← 1981 ·	WTA Tour Championships	· 1983 →

Defending champions Martina Navratilova and Pam Shriver defeated Kathy Jordan and Anne Smith in the final, 6–4, 6–3 to win the doubles tennis title at the 1982 Avon Championships. It was Navratilova's fifth Tour Finals doubles title, and Shriver's second.

== Draw ==
=== Key ===
- Q = Qualifier
- WC = Wild card
- LL = Lucky loser
- Alt = Alternate
- SE = Special exempt
- PR = Protected ranking
- ITF = ITF entry
- JE = Junior exempt
- w/o = Walkover
- r = Retired
- d = Defaulted
- SR = Special ranking

Semifinals
(United States) Kathy Jordan (United States) Anne Smith	3	7	6
(United States) Rosemary Casals (Australia) Wendy Turnbull	6	6	4
(United States) Barbara Potter (United States) Sharon Walsh	1	6
(United States) Martina Navratilova (United States) Pam Shriver	6	7

Final
(United States) Kathy Jordan (United States) Anne Smith	4	3
(United States) Martina Navratilova (United States) Pam Shriver	6	6
