= 1992 Virginia Slims Championships =

- Date: November 16–22
- Edition: 22nd
- Category: WTA Finals
- Draw: 16S / 8D
- Prize money: $3,000,000
- Surface: Carpet / indoor
- Location: New York City, New York
- Venue: Madison Square Garden

Champions

Singles
- (Socialist Federal Republic of Yugoslavia) Monica Seles

Doubles
- (Spain) Arantxa Sánchez Vicario / (Czechoslovakia) Helena Suková
| ← 1991 · | WTA Finals | · 1993 → |

The 1992 Virginia Slims Championships was a women's tennis tournament played on indoor carpet courts in Madison Square Garden in New York City, New York between November 16 and November 22, 1992. It was the 22nd edition of the end-of-season event, eligible for the top-ranked singles and doubles players on the Women's Tennis Association (WTA) tour. First-seeded Monica Seles won her third consecutive singles title at the event and earned $250,000 first-prize money.

== Finals ==
=== Singles ===
(Federal Republic of Yugoslavia) Monica Seles defeated (United States) Martina Navratilova, 7–5, 6–3, 6–1

- It was Seles' 10th and last singles title of the year and the 30th of her career.

=== Doubles ===
(Spain) Arantxa Sánchez Vicario / (Czechoslovakia) Helena Suková defeated (Czechoslovakia) Jana Novotná / (Latvia) Larisa Savchenko Neiland, 7–6^{(7–4)}, 6–1
