= 1984 Virginia Slims Championships – Singles =

Singles
- 1984 Virginia Slims Championships

Final
- Champion: (United States) Martina Navratilova
- Runner-up: (United States) Chris Evert-Lloyd
- Score: 6–3, 7–5, 6–1

Details
- Draw: 16
- Seeds: 8

Events
Singles	Doubles
- Virginia Slims Championships

Defending champion Martina Navratilova defeated Chris Evert-Lloyd in a rematch of the previous year's final, 6–3, 7–5, 6–1 to win the singles tennis title at the 1984 Virginia Slims Championships. It was her fifth Tour Finals singles title.

This was the first edition of the tournament to feature a best-of-five-sets final.

== Seeds ==
1. (United States) Martina Navratilova (champion)
2. (United States) Chris Evert-Lloyd (final)
3. (United States) Pam Shriver (semifinals)
4. (United States) Andrea Jaeger (first round)
5. (United Kingdom) Jo Durie (first round)
6. (Czechoslovakia) Hana Mandlíková (quarterfinals)
7. (Hungary) Andrea Temesvári (first round)
8. (United States) Zina Garrison (first round)

== Draw ==
Key

- Q = Qualifier
- WC = Wild card
- LL = Lucky loser
- Alt = Alternate
- ITF = ITF entry
- PR = Protected ranking
- SR = Special ranking
- SE = Special exempt
- JE = Junior exempt
- JR = Junior Accelerator Programme entrant
- CO = College Accelerator Programme entrant
- NG = Next Gen Accelerator Program entrant
- w/o = Walkover
- r = Retired
- d = Defaulted

First round
1	(United States) Martina Navratilova	6	6
(Romania) Virginia Ruzici	3	1
(Canada) Carling Bassett	6	6
8	(United States) Zina Garrison	4	4
3	(United States) Pam Shriver	6	6
(Australia) Wendy Turnbull	4	4
(West Germany) Sylvia Hanika	6	2	3
6	(Czechoslovakia) Hana Mandlíková	4	6	6
7	(Hungary) Andrea Temesvári	6	6	2^{r}
(United States) Barbara Potter	3	7	1
(United States) Kathleen Horvath	6	7
4	(United States) Andrea Jaeger	2	6
5	(United Kingdom) Jo Durie	6	6
(Czechoslovakia) Helena Suková	7	7
(United States) Kathy Jordan	5	6	3
2	(United States) Chris Evert-Lloyd	7	4	6

Quarterfinals
1	(United States) Martina Navratilova	6	6
(Canada) Carling Bassett	3	0
3	(United States) Pam Shriver	6	7
6	(Czechoslovakia) Hana Mandlíková	3	6
(United States) Barbara Potter	6	6
(United States) Kathleen Horvath	2	1
(Czechoslovakia) Helena Suková	1	2
2	(United States) Chris Evert-Lloyd	6	6

Semifinals
1	(United States) Martina Navratilova	7	6
3	(United States) Pam Shriver	6	4
(United States) Barbara Potter	4	1
2	(United States) Chris Evert-Lloyd	6	6

Final
1	(United States) Martina Navratilova	6	7	6
2	(United States) Chris Evert-Lloyd	3	5	1

== See also ==
- WTA Tour Championships appearances
