= 1972 Virginia Slims Championships =

- Date: October 9 – 15
- Edition: 1st
- Category: Year-end Championship
- Draw: 16S
- Prize money: $100,000
- Surface: Clay (Green) / outdoor
- Location: Boca Raton, Florida, U.S.
- Venue: Boca Raton Hotel & Club

Champions

Singles
- (United States) Chris Evert
Virginia Slims Championships	· 1973 →

The 1972 Virgin Slims Championships were the first season-ending championships of the Virginia Slims Circuit (a precursor to the WTA Tour), the annual tennis tournament for the best female tennis players in singles on the 1972 Virginia Slims circuit. The singles-only tournament was played on outdoor clay courts and was held from October 9 through October 15, 1972, at the Boca Raton Hotel & Club in Boca Raton, Florida in the United States. Fourth-seeded Chris Evert won the title but could not accept the first place prize money of $25,000 as she was not yet 18 years old and therefore was classified as an amateur.

== Champion ==
(United States) Chris Evert defeated (Australia) Kerry Melville, 7–5, 6–4.

- It was Evert's 4th singles title of the year and the 11th of her career.

== Prize money ==
Event	W	F	3rd	4th	QF	Round of 16
Singles	$25,000	$15,000	$9,000	$7,000	$4,000	$2,000
