= 1995 WTA Tour Championships =

- Date: November 13–19
- Edition: 25th (singles) / 24th (doubles)
- Category: WTA Finals
- Draw: 16S / 16D
- Prize money: $2,000,000
- Surface: Carpet / indoor
- Location: New York City, United States
- Venue: Madison Square Garden

Champions

Singles
- (Germany) Steffi Graf

Doubles
- (Czech Republic) Jana Novotná / (Spain) Arantxa Sánchez Vicario
← 1994 ·	WTA Finals	· 1996 →

The 1995 WTA Tour Championships, also known by its sponsored name Corel WTA Tour Championships, was a women's tennis tournament played on indoor carpet courts at Madison Square Garden in New York City, New York in the United States. It was the 24th edition of the season-ending singles championships and the 21st edition of the year-end doubles championships. The event was part of the 1995 WTA Tour and was held from November 13 and November 19, 1995. First-seeded Steffi Graf won the singles title, her fourth, and the accompanying $500,000 first-prize money.

== Finals ==
=== Singles ===
(Germany) Steffi Graf defeated (Germany) Anke Huber, 6–1, 2–6, 6–1, 4–6, 6–3.

=== Doubles ===
(Czech Republic) Jana Novotná / (Spain) Arantxa Sánchez Vicario defeated (United States) Gigi Fernández / (Belarus) Natasha Zvereva, 6–2, 6–1.
