= 1994 Virginia Slims Championships =

- Date: November 14–20
- Edition: 24th
- Category: WTA Finals
- Draw: 16S / 8D
- Prize money: $3,708,500
- Surface: Carpet / indoor
- Location: New York City, United States
- Venue: Madison Square Garden

Champions

Singles
- (Argentina) Gabriela Sabatini

Doubles
- (United States) Gigi Fernández / (Belarus) Natasha Zvereva
| ← 1993 · | WTA Finals | · 1995 → |

The 1994 Virginia Slims Championships were played on indoor carpet courts at the Madison Square Garden in New York City, United States between November 14 and November 20. It marked the last singles tournament for Martina Navratilova until her comeback in 2002. The singles title was won by unseeded Gabriela Sabatini who earned $250,000 first-prize money. This was the final year with Virginia Slims as the title sponsor of the season-ending championships.

== Finals ==
=== Singles ===
(Argentina) Gabriela Sabatini defeated (United States) Lindsay Davenport, 6–3, 6–2, 6–4

- It was Sabatini's only singles title of the year and the 26th of her career.

=== Singles ===
(United States) Gigi Fernández / (Belarus) Natasha Zvereva defeated (Czech Republic) Jana Novotná / (Spain) Arantxa Sánchez Vicario, 6–3, 6–7^{(4–7)}, 6–3
