= 1988 Virginia Slims Championships =

- Date: November 14–20
- Edition: 18th (singles) / 13th (doubles)
- Draw: 16S / 8D
- Prize money: $1,000,000
- Surface: Carpet / indoor
- Location: New York City, U.S.
- Venue: Madison Square Garden

Champions

Singles
- (Argentina) Gabriela Sabatini

Doubles
- (United States) Martina Navratilova / (United States) Pam Shriver
← 1987 ·	Virginia Slims Championships	· 1989 →

The 1988 Virginia Slims Championships was a women's tennis tournament played on indoor carpet courts at Madison Square Garden in New York City, New York in the United States. It was the 17th edition of the year-end singles championships, the 13th edition of the year-end doubles championships, and was part of the 1988 WTA Tour. The tournament ran from November 14 through November 20, 1988. Fourth-seeded Gabriela Sabatini won the singles title.

Having become the only player in history to win the Golden Grand Slam by taking the Australian Open, French Open, Wimbledon and US Open singles titles, along with the Olympic gold medal; Steffi Graf's defeat in the semi-finals by Pam Shriver deprived her of the Super Slam and the Super Golden Slam.

== Finals ==
=== Singles ===
(Argentina) Gabriela Sabatini defeated (United States) Pam Shriver, 7–5, 6–2, 6–2.

- It was Sabatini's 4th and last singles title of the year and the 9th of her career.

=== Doubles ===
(United States) Martina Navratilova / (United States) Pam Shriver defeated (Soviet Union) Larisa Savchenko / (Soviet Union) Natasha Zvereva, 6–3, 6–4.

- It was Navratilova's 17th title of the year and the 281st overall title of her career. It was Shriver's 11th title of the year and the 114th of her career.

== See also ==
- 1988 Nabisco Masters
