= 1973 Virginia Slims Championships =

- Date: October 15–23
- Edition: 2nd
- Draw: 8S / 16D
- Prize money: $110,000
- Surface: Clay (Green) / outdoor
- Location: Boca Raton, United States
- Venue: Boca Raton Hotel & Club

Champions

Singles
- (United States) Chris Evert

Doubles
- (United States) Rosemary Casals / (Australia) Margaret Court
← 1972 ·	Virginia Slims Championships	· 1974 →

The 1973 Virginia Slims Championships were the second season-ending WTA Tour Championships, the annual tennis tournament for the best female tennis players in singles on the 1973 Virginia Slims circuit which was part of the 1973 WTA Tour. It was held from October 15 to 23, 1973 at the Boca Raton Hotel & Club in Boca Raton, United States. Both the top two qualifying players and top seeds Margaret Court and Billie Jean King had to withdraw from the tournament due to injury, although Court did compete (and win) in the doubles event. Fourth ranked Evonne Goolagong also defaulted. First-seeded Chris Evert won her second consecutive singles title at the event.

== Finals ==
=== Singles ===
(United States) Chris Evert defeated (United States) Nancy Richey, 6–3, 6–3

- It was Evert's 11th singles title of the year and the 22nd of her career.

=== Doubles ===
(United States) Rosemary Casals / (Australia) Margaret Court defeated (France) Françoise Dürr / (Netherlands) Betty Stöve, 6–2, 6–4

== Prize money ==
Event	W	F	SF	QF	2R	1R
Singles	$25,000	$14,000	$7,000	$3,500	$1,750	$800
