= 1990 Virginia Slims Championships =

Tennis tournament

- Date: November 12–18
- Edition: 20th
- Category: WTA Finals
- Draw: 16S / 8D
- Prize money: $3,000,000
- Surface: Carpet / indoor
- Location: New York City, United States
- Venue: Madison Square Garden

Champions

Singles
- (Socialist Federal Republic of Yugoslavia) Monica Seles

Doubles
- (United States) Kathy Jordan / (Australia) Elizabeth Sayers
← 1989 ·	WTA Finals	· 1991 →

The 1990 Virginia Slims Championships was the season-ending women's tennis held on indoor carpet courts at the Madison Square Garden in New York, United States between November 12 and November 18, 1990. Second-seeded Monica Seles won the singles title in the first five set women's final since Elisabeth Moore won the 1901 U.S. National Championships. Seles received $250,000 first-prize money. Martina Navratilova had qualified for the tournament but withdrew in order to undergo a knee operation.

== Finals ==
=== Singles ===
(Socialist Federal Republic of Yugoslavia) Monica Seles defeated (Argentina) Gabriela Sabatini, 6–4, 5–7, 3–6, 6–4, 6–2.

=== Doubles ===
(United States) Kathy Jordan / (Australia) Elizabeth Sayers defeated (Argentina) Mercedes Paz / (Spain) Arantxa Sánchez Vicario, 7–6^{(7–4)}, 6–4.
