= 1982 Avon Championships – Singles =

Singles
- 1982 Avon Championships

Final
- Champion: (West Germany) Sylvia Hanika
- Runner-up: (United States) Martina Navratilova
- Score: 1–6, 6–3, 6–4

Details
- Draw: 8 (RR + elimination)

Events
Singles	Doubles
- WTA Tour Championships

Sylvia Hanika defeated the defending champion Martina Navratilova in the final, 1–6, 6–3, 6–4 to win the singles tennis title at the 1982 Avon Championships.

== Draw ==
Key

- Q = Qualifier
- WC = Wild card
- LL = Lucky loser
- Alt = Alternate
- ITF = ITF entry
- PR = Protected ranking
- SR = Special ranking
- SE = Special exempt
- JE = Junior exempt
- JR = Junior Accelerator Programme entrant
- CO = College Accelerator Programme entrant
- NG = Next Gen Accelerator Program entrant
- w/o = Walkover
- r = Retired
- d = Defaulted

=== Finals ===
Play-off round
(United States) Anne Smith	6	3	6
(United States) Kathy Jordan	2	6	1
(Australia) Wendy Turnbull	6	3	6
(Socialist Federal Republic of Yugoslavia) Mima Jaušovec	1	6	2

Semifinals
1	(United States) Martina Navratilova	6	6
(United States) Anne Smith	4	3
2	(West Germany) Sylvia Hanika	6	5	6
(Australia) Wendy Turnbull	4	7	4

Final
1	(United States) Martina Navratilova	6	3	4
2	(West Germany) Sylvia Hanika	1	6	6

=== Round robin ===
==== Red group ====
		(United States) Navratilova	(Australia) Turnbull	(United States) Jordan	(West Germany) Bunge	RR W–L	Set W–L	Game W–L	Standings
1	(United States) Martina Navratilova		6–2, 6–2	Not played	6–1, 6–2	2–0	4–0 (100.0%)	24–7 (77.4%)	1 Q
	(Australia) Wendy Turnbull	2–6, 2–6		6–1, 6–3	Not played	1–1	2–2 (50.0%)	16–16 (50.0%)	2 PO
	(United States) Kathy Jordan	Not played	3–6, 3–6		2–6, 6–3, 6–2	1–1	2–3 (40.0%)	20–23 (46.5%)	3 PO
	(West Germany) Bettina Bunge	1–6, 2–6	Not played	6–2, 3–6, 2–6		0–2	1–4 (20.0%)	14–26 (35.0%)	4

Q: qualifies to semifinals. PO: advances to play-off round. Allen takes 2nd place after defeating Mandlíková

==== White group ====
		(West Germany) Hanika	(United States) Smith	(Socialist Federal Republic of Yugoslavia) Jaušovec	(United States) Potter	RR W–L	Set W–L	Game W–L	Standings
2	(West Germany) Sylvia Hanika		6–7, 6–3, 6–4	6–4, 6–1	Not played	2–0	4–1 (80%)	30–19 (61.2%)	1 Q
	(United States) Anne Smith	7–6, 3–6, 4–6		Not played	6–4, 7–6	1–1	3–2 (60.0%)	27–28 (49.1%)	2 PO
	(Socialist Federal Republic of Yugoslavia) Mima Jaušovec	4–6, 1–6	Not played		7–6, 7–5	1–1	2–2 (50.0%)	19–23 (45.2%)	3 PO
	(United States) Barbara Potter	Not played	4–6, 6–7	6–7, 5–7		0–2	0–4 (0.0%)	21–27 (43.8%)	4

Q: qualifies to semifinals. PO: advances to play-off round.
