= 1991 Virginia Slims Championships =

- Date: November 18–24
- Edition: 21st
- Category: WTA Finals
- Draw: 16S / 8D
- Prize money: $3,000,000 (Note: Including $2,000,000 bonus pool.)
- Surface: Carpet / indoor
- Location: New York City, United States
- Venue: Madison Square Gardens

Champions

Singles
- (Socialist Federal Republic of Yugoslavia) Monica Seles

Doubles
- (United States) Martina Navratilova / (United States) Pam Shriver
← 1990 ·	WTA Finals	· 1992 →

The 1991 Virginia Slims Championships was the season-ending women's tennis held on indoor carpet courts at the Madison Square Garden in New York, United States between November 18 and November 24, 1991. It was the 21st edition of the end-of-season event, eligible for the top-ranked singles and doubles players on the Women's Tennis Association (WTA) tour. First-seeded Monica Seles won her second consecutive singles title at the event.

== Finals ==
=== Singles ===
(Socialist Federal Republic of Yugoslavia) Monica Seles defeated (United States) Martina Navratilova 6–4, 3–6, 7–5, 6–0

- It was Seles' 10th and last singles title of the year and the 20th of her career.

=== Doubles ===
(United States) Martina Navratilova / (United States) Pam Shriver defeated (United States) Gigi Fernández / (Czechoslovakia) Jana Novotná 4–6, 7–5, 6–4
