= 2000 WTA Tour Championships =

- Date: November 13–19
- Edition: 30th / 25th
- Category: Year-end championships
- Draw: 16S / 8D
- Prize money: $2,000,000
- Surface: Carpet / indoor
- Location: New York City, United States
- Venue: Madison Square Garden

Champions

Singles
- (Switzerland) Martina Hingis

Doubles
- (Switzerland) Martina Hingis / (Russia) Anna Kournikova
← 1999 ·	WTA Finals	· 2001 →

The 2000 WTA Tour Championships, also known by its sponsored name The Chase Championships was a women's tennis tournament played on indoor carpet courts at the Madison Square Garden in New York City, New York in the United States. It was the 30th edition of the year-end singles championships, the 25th edition of the year-end doubles championships, and was part of the 2000 WTA Tour. The tournament was held from November 13 through November 19, 2000. First-seeded Martina Hingis won the singles event and the accompanying $500,000 first prize money as well as 390 ranking points. It was the last edition of the WTA Tour Championships to be held in New York.

Five players, Venus Williams, Serena Williams, Mary Pierce, Amélie Mauresmo and Anke Huber, had qualified for the tournament but withdrew citing various injuries and ailments.

== Finals ==
=== Singles ===
(Switzerland) Martina Hingis defeated (United States) Monica Seles, 6–7^{(5–7)}, 6–4, 6–4.

- It was Hingis' 9th title of the year and the 35th of her career.

=== Doubles ===
(Switzerland) Martina Hingis / (Russia) Anna Kournikova defeated (United States) Nicole Arendt / (Netherlands) Manon Bollegraf, 6–2, 6–3.
