= 2002 WTA Tour Championships – Doubles =

2002 WTA Doubles championship

Doubles
- 2002 WTA Tour Championships

Final
- Champions: (Russia) Elena Dementieva (Slovakia) Janette Husárová
- Runners-up: (Zimbabwe) Cara Black (Russia) Elena Likhovtseva
- Score: 4–6, 6–4, 6–3

Details
- Draw: 8
- Seeds: 4

Events
Singles	Doubles
- WTA Tour Championships

Elena Dementieva and Janette Husárová defeated Cara Black and Elena Likhovtseva in the final, 4–6, 6–4, 6–3 to win the doubles tennis title at the 2002 WTA Tour Championships.

Lisa Raymond and Rennae Stubbs were the defending champions, but were defeated in the semifinals by Black and Likhovtseva.

== Seeds ==
1. (Spain) Virginia Ruano Pascual / (Argentina) Paola Suárez (first round)
2. (United States) Lisa Raymond / (Australia) Rennae Stubbs (semifinals)
3. (Russia) Elena Dementieva / (Slovakia) Janette Husárová (champions)
4. (Slovakia) Daniela Hantuchová / (Spain) Arantxa Sánchez Vicario (withdrew)
5. (Zimbabwe) Cara Black / (Russia) Elena Likhovtseva (final)

== Draw ==
Key

- Q = Qualifier
- WC = Wild card
- LL = Lucky loser
- Alt = Alternate
- ITF = ITF entry
- PR = Protected ranking
- SR = Special ranking
- SE = Special exempt
- JE = Junior exempt
- JR = Junior Accelerator Programme entrant
- CO = College Accelerator Programme entrant
- NG = Next Gen Accelerator Program entrant
- w/o = Walkover
- r = Retired
- d = Defaulted

=== Finals ===
First round
1	(Spain) Virginia Ruano Pascual (Argentina) Paola Suárez	4	3
(Japan) Rika Fujiwara (Japan) Ai Sugiyama	6	6
3	(Russia) Elena Dementieva (Slovakia) Janette Husárová	6	4	6
Alt	(Slovenia) Tina Križan (Slovenia) Katarina Srebotnik	3	6	2
(United States) Nicole Arendt (South Africa) Liezel Huber	3	5
5	(Zimbabwe) Cara Black (Russia) Elena Likhovtseva	6	7
(Chinese Taipei) Janet Lee (Indonesia) Wynne Prakusya	3	1
2	(United States) Lisa Raymond (Australia) Rennae Stubbs	6	6

Semifinals
(Japan) Rika Fujiwara (Japan) Ai Sugiyama	6	5	4
3	(Russia) Elena Dementieva (Slovakia) Janette Husárová	4	7	6
5	(Zimbabwe) Cara Black (Russia) Elena Likhovtseva	3	6	7^{7}
2	(United States) Lisa Raymond (Australia) Rennae Stubbs	6	3	6^{4}

Finals
3	(Russia) Elena Dementieva (Slovakia) Janette Husárová	4	6	6
5	(Zimbabwe) Cara Black (Russia) Elena Likhovtseva	6	4	3
