= 1993 Virginia Slims Championships =

- Date: November 15–21
- Edition: 23rd
- Category: WTA Finals
- Draw: 16S / 8D
- Prize money: $3,708,500
- Surface: Carpet / indoor
- Location: New York City, New York
- Venue: Madison Square Garden

Champions

Singles
- (Germany) Steffi Graf

Doubles
- (United States) Gigi Fernández / (Belarus) Natalia Zvereva
← 1992 ·	Virginia Slims Championships	· 1994 →

The 1993 Virginia Slims Championships was a professional women's tennis tournament played on indoor carpet courts at the Madison Square Garden in New York City, New York between November 15 and November 21, 1993. It was the 23rd edition of the end-of-season event, eligible for the top-ranked singles and doubles players on the Women's Tennis Association (WTA) tour. First-seeded Steffi Graf won the singles title and earned $250,000 first-prize money. Three-time defending champion Monica Seles did not participate due to a stabbing earlier in the year.

== Finals ==
=== Singles ===
(Germany) Steffi Graf defeated (Spain) Arantxa Sánchez Vicario, 6–1, 6–4, 3–6, 6–1

- It was Graf's 10th singles title of the year and the 79th of her career.

=== Doubles ===
(United States) Gigi Fernández / (Belarus) Natalia Zvereva defeated (Czech Republic) Jana Novotná / (Latvia) Larisa Savchenko Neiland, 6–3, 7–5

== Prize money ==
Event	W	F	SF	QF	Round of 16
Singles	$250,000	$120,000	$53,000	$26,000	$14,000
Doubles	$90,000	$46,000	$25,000	$13,000	NA

Doubles prize money is per team.
