= 1989 Virginia Slims Championships =

- Date: November 13—19
- Edition: 19th
- Draw: 8S / 8D
- Prize money: $1,000,000
- Surface: Carpet / indoor
- Location: New York City, New York
- Venue: Madison Square Garden
- Attendance: 94,850

Champions

Singles
- (West Germany) Steffi Graf

Doubles
- (United States) Martina Navratilova / (United States) Pam Shriver
← 1988 ·	Virginia Slims Championships	· 1990 →

The 1989 Virginia Slims Championships was the nineteenth WTA Tour Championships, the annual tennis tournament for the best female tennis players in singles on the 1989 WTA Tour. It was the 19th edition of the tournament and was held from November 13 through November 19, 1989 on indoor carpet courts in Madison Square Garden in New York City, New York. First-seeded Steffi Graf won the singles title, her second at the event after 1987, and earned $125,000 first-prize money.

== Finals ==
=== Singles ===
(West Germany) Steffi Graf defeated (United States) Martina Navratilova, 6–4, 7–5, 2–6, 6–2

- It was Graf's 14th singles title of the year and the 44th of her career.

=== Doubles ===
(United States) Martina Navratilova / (United States) Pam Shriver defeated (Soviet Union) Larisa Savchenko / (Soviet Union) Natasha Zvereva, 6–3, 6–2
