= 1978 Virginia Slims Championships =

- Date: March 29 – April 2
- Edition: 7th
- Category: Virginia Slims Championships
- Draw: 8S (RR)
- Prize money: $150,000
- Location: Oakland, United States
- Venue: Oakland Coliseum Arena

Champions

Singles
- (Czechoslovakia) Martina Navratilova
- Virginia Slims Championships

The 1978 Virginia Slims Championships were the seventh WTA Tour Championships, the annual tennis tournament for the best female tennis players in singles on the 1978 WTA Tour. The singles event consisted of two round robin groups (Gold and Orange) of four players each. The winners of each group played each other in the final and additionally there was a play-off match for third place. The tournament was held from March 29 to April 2, 1978, in the Oakland Coliseum Arena. Top-seeded Martina Navratilova won the singles event and the accompanying $50,000 first prize money.

The doubles tournament was held separately in Salt Lake City, Utah as the fourth edition of the WTA Doubles Championships.

== Final ==
=== Singles ===
(United States) Martina Navratilova defeated (Australia) Evonne Goolagong, 7–6^{(5–0)}, 6–4

== Prize money ==
Event	W	F	3rd	4th	5th	6th	7th	8th
Singles	$50,000	$30,000	$16,000	$14,000	$11,000	$11,000	$9,000	$9,000

== See also ==
- 1978 Colgate Series Championships
