= 2002 WTA Tour Championships =

- Date: November 6 – 11
- Edition: 32nd
- Category: Year-end championships
- Draw: 16S/8D
- Prize money: $3,000,000
- Surface: Hard/indoor
- Location: Los Angeles, United States
- Venue: Staples Center

Champions

Singles
- (Belgium) Kim Clijsters

Doubles
- (Russia) Elena Dementieva / (Slovakia) Janette Husárová
- WTA Finals

The 2002 WTA Tour Championships, also known by its sponsored name Home Depot Championships, was a women's tennis tournament played on indoor hard courts at the Staples Center in Los Angeles, United States. It was the 32nd edition of the year-end singles championships, the 27th edition of the year-end doubles championships, and was part of the 2002 WTA Tour. The tournament was held between November 6 and November 11, 2002. Fifth-seeded Kim Clijsters won the singles event and earned $765,000 first-prize money as well as 485 ranking points. Total attendance for the event, held for the first time at the Staples Center, was 56,862.

Amélie Mauresmo and Martina Hingis had qualified for the tournament but withdrew due to injuries.

== Finals ==
=== Singles ===
(Belgium) Kim Clijsters defeated (United States) Serena Williams, 7–5, 6–3.

- It was Clijsters' 4th title of the year and the 10th of her career.

=== Doubles ===
(Russia) Elena Dementieva / (Slovakia) Janette Husárová defeated (Zimbabwe) Cara Black / (Russia) Elena Likhovtseva, 4–6, 6–4, 6–3.
