= 1986 Virginia Slims Championships (March) =

- Date: March 17–23, 1986
- Edition: 15th
- Category: WTA Tour Championships
- Draw: 16S / 8D
- Prize money: US$500,000
- Surface: Carpet (Indoor)
- Location: New York City, United States
- Venue: Madison Square Garden

Champions

Singles
- (United States) Martina Navratilova

Doubles
- (Czechoslovakia) Hana Mandlíková / (Australia) Wendy Turnbull
- Virginia Slims Championships

The Virginia Slims Championships was held twice in 1986 because of a change of schedule from March to November.

It was the fifteenth season-ending WTA Tour Championships, the annual tennis tournament for the best female tennis players in singles on the 1985 WTA Tour, which ran from March 1985 to March 1986. It was held from March 17 through March 23, 1986 in New York City, New York in the United States. First-seeded Martina Navratilova won the singles title.

== Finals ==
=== Singles ===
- (United States) Martina Navratilova defeated (Czechoslovakia) Hana Mandlíková 6–2, 6–0, 3–6, 6–1

=== Doubles ===
- (Czechoslovakia) Hana Mandlíková / (Australia) Wendy Turnbull defeated (West Germany) Claudia Kohde-Kilsch / (Czechoslovakia) Helena Suková 6–4, 6–7^{(4–7)}, 6–3
