= 1982 Avon Championships =

- Date: March 24–28
- Edition: 11th
- Category: WTA Tour Championships
- Draw: 8S / 4D
- Prize money: $300,000
- Surface: Carpet (Sporteze) / indoor
- Location: New York City, New York
- Venue: Madison Square Garden
- Attendance: 60,988

Champions

Singles
- (West Germany) Sylvia Hanika

Doubles
- (United States) Martina Navratilova / (United States) Pam Shriver
- WTA Championships

The 1982 Avon Championships were the eleventh WTA Tour Championships, the annual women's tennis tournament for the best players of the 11 tournament Avon Championships Circuit on the 1982 WTA Tour. It was the 11th edition of the event and was played from March 24 through March 28, 1982 on indoor carpet courts at the Madison Square Garden in New York City, New York. Fifth-seeded Sylvia Hanika won the singles title, after trailing Navratilova 1–6, 1–3 in the final, and earned $100,000 first-prize money.

== Finals ==
=== Singles ===
(West Germany) Sylvia Hanika defeated (United States) Martina Navratilova, 1–6, 6–3, 6–4

- It was Hanika's 1st singles title of the year and the 4th of her career.

=== Doubles ===
(United States) Martina Navratilova and (United States) Pam Shriver defeated (United States) Kathy Jordan and (United States) Anne Smith, 6–4, 6–3

== See also ==
- 1982 Toyota Series Championships
