= 1986 Virginia Slims Championships (November) =

- Date: November 17–23
- Edition: 16th
- Category: WTA Tour Championships
- Draw: 16S / 8D
- Prize money: US$500,000
- Surface: Carpet (Indoor)
- Location: New York City, United States
- Venue: Madison Square Garden

Champions

Singles
- (United States) Martina Navratilova

Doubles
- (United States) Martina Navratilova / (United States) Pam Shriver
- Virginia Slims Championships

The Virginia Slims Championships was held twice in 1986 because of a change of schedule from March to November.

It was the sixteenth season-ending WTA Tour Championships, the annual tennis tournament for the best female tennis players in singles on the 1986 WTA Tour. It was held from 17 to 23 November 1986 in New York City, New York, United States. First-seeded Martina Navratilova won the singles title.

== Finals ==
=== Singles ===
- (United States) Martina Navratilova defeated (West Germany) Steffi Graf 7–6^{(8–6)}, 6–3, 6–2

=== Doubles ===
- (United States) Martina Navratilova / (United States) Pam Shriver defeated (West Germany) Claudia Kohde-Kilsch / (Czechoslovakia) Helena Suková 7–6^{(7–1)}, 6–3
