= 1997 WTA Tour Championships – Doubles =

Doubles
- 1997 Chase Championships

Final
- Champions: (United States) Lindsay Davenport (Czech Republic) Jana Novotná
- Runners-up: (France) Alexandra Fusai (France) Nathalie Tauziat
- Score: 6–7, 6–3, 6–2

Details
- Draw: 8
- Seeds: 4

Events
Singles	Doubles
- Chase Championships

Defending champion Lindsay Davenport and her partner Jana Novotná defeated Alexandra Fusai and Nathalie Tauziat in the final, 6–7, 6–3, 6–2 to win the doubles tennis title at the 1997 WTA Tour Championships.

Davenport and Mary Joe Fernández were the reigning champions, but only Davenport competed that year.

== Seeds ==
Champion seeds are indicated in bold text while text in italics indicates the round in which those seeds were eliminated.

1. (United States) Gigi Fernández / (Belarus) Natasha Zvereva (quarterfinals)
2. (Switzerland) Martina Hingis / (Spain) Arantxa Sánchez Vicario (quarterfinals)
3. (United States) **Lindsay Davenport** / (Czech Republic) **Jana Novotná (champions)**
4. (United States) Nicole Arendt / (Netherlands) Manon Bollegraf (semifinals)

== Draw ==
Key

- Q = Qualifier
- WC = Wild card
- LL = Lucky loser
- Alt = Alternate
- ITF = ITF entry
- PR = Protected ranking
- SR = Special ranking
- SE = Special exempt
- JE = Junior exempt
- JR = Junior Accelerator Programme entrant
- CO = College Accelerator Programme entrant
- NG = Next Gen Accelerator Program entrant
- w/o = Walkover
- r = Retired
- d = Defaulted

Quarterfinals
1	(United States) Gigi Fernández (Belarus) Natasha Zvereva	5	**6**	4
(Latvia) **Larisa Neiland** (Czech Republic) **Helena Suková**	**7**	3	**6**
3	(United States) **Lindsay Davenport** (Czech Republic) **Jana Novotná**	**6**	**7**
(Indonesia) Yayuk Basuki (Netherlands) Caroline Vis	1	5
(Spain) Conchita Martínez (Argentina) Patricia Tarabini	2	6
4	(United States) **Nicole Arendt** (Netherlands) **Manon Bollegraf**	**6**	**7**
(France) **Alexandra Fusai** (France) **Nathalie Tauziat**	**6**	**6**
2	(Switzerland) Martina Hingis (Spain) Arantxa Sánchez Vicario	3	1

Semifinals
(Latvia) Larisa Neiland (Czech Republic) Helena Suková	0	6
3	(United States) **Lindsay Davenport** (Czech Republic) **Jana Novotná**	**6**	**7**
4	(United States) Nicole Arendt (Netherlands) Manon Bollegraf	3	2^{r}
(France) **Alexandra Fusai** (France) **Nathalie Tauziat**	**6**	3

Final
3	(United States) **Lindsay Davenport** (Czech Republic) **Jana Novotná**	6	**6**	**6**
(France) Alexandra Fusai (France) Nathalie Tauziat	**7**	3	2
