= 1984 Virginia Slims Championships =

- Date: February 28 — March 4
- Edition: 13th
- Draw: 16S / 8D
- Prize money: $500,000
- Surface: Carpet (indoors)
- Location: New York City, New York
- Venue: Madison Square Garden

Champions

Singles
- (United States) Martina Navratilova

Doubles
- (United States) Martina Navratilova / (United States) Pam Shriver
- Virginia Slims Championships

The 1984 Virginia Slims Championships were the thirteenth WTA Tour Championships, the annual tennis tournament for the best female tennis players in singles on the 1983 WTA Tour. (Note: The 1983 WTA Tour ran from January 1983 until February 1984.) It was the 13th edition of the tournament and was held from February 28 through March 4, 1984 at the Madison Square Garden in New York City, New York. First-seeded Martina Navratilova won the singles title.

== Finals ==
=== Singles ===
- (United States) Martina Navratilova defeated (United States) Chris Evert-Lloyd, 6–3, 7–5, 6–1
- It was Navratilova's 2nd singles title of the year and the 88th of her career.

=== Doubles ===
- (United States) Martina Navratilova / (United States) Pam Shriver defeated (United Kingdom) Jo Durie / (United States) Ann Kiyomura, 6–3, 6–1

== Prize money ==
Event	W	F	3rd	4th	QF	Round of 16
Singles	$125,000	$60,000	$30,000	$24,000	$14,000	$7,500
Doubles	$45,000	$23,000	$13,000		$6,500	–
Doubles prize money per team

== See also ==
- Evert–Navratilova rivalry
