= 1975 Virginia Slims Championships =

- Date: March 31 - April 5
- Edition: 4th
- Category: Virginia Slims Championships
- Draw: 16S (8RR)
- Prize money: $150,000
- Surface: Carpet / indoor
- Location: Los Angeles, United States
- Venue: Los Angeles Sports Arena

Champions

Singles
- (United States) Chris Evert
- Virginia Slims Championships

The 1975 Virginia Slims Championships were the fourth season-ending Tour Championships, the annual tennis tournament for the best female tennis players in singles on the Virginia Slims Circuit. The 16 best players, based on points average, qualified for the tournament provided they had played at least six tournaments. The singles event consisted of an elimination round and the eight winners were subsequently divided over two round robin groups (Gold and Green). The winners of each group played each other in the final and additionally there were play-off matches for third, fifth and seventh place. The tournament was played on synthetic carpet (Sporteze) and was held in the week of March 31 to April 5, 1975, at the Los Angeles Sports Arena in Los Angeles, California. This was the first year the tournament switched from October to April.

The doubles tournament was held separately in Tokyo, Japan as the first edition of the WTA Doubles Championships.

== Champions ==
=== Singles ===
(United States) Chris Evert defeated (Czechoslovakia) Martina Navratilova, 6–4, 6–2.

- It was Evert's 4th singles title of the year and the 43rd of her career.

== See also ==
- Evert–Navratilova rivalry
- 1975 Bridgestone Doubles Championships
