= 1997 Chase Championships =

- Date: November 17–23
- Edition: 27th (singles) / 26th (doubles)
- Category: Year-end championships
- Draw: 16S / 8D
- Surface: Carpet / indoor
- Location: New York, US
- Venue: Madison Square Garden

Champions

Singles
- (Czech Republic) Jana Novotná

Doubles
- (United States) Lindsay Davenport / (Czech Republic) Jana Novotná
- WTA Finals

The 1997 Chase Championships was a women's tennis tournament played on indoor carpet courts at Madison Square Garden in New York City, New York, in the United States. It was the 26th edition of the year-end singles championships, the 22nd edition of the year-end doubles championships, and was part of the 1997 WTA Tour. The tournament was held from November 17 through November 23, 1997. Second-seeded Jana Novotná won the singles title.

== Finals ==
=== Singles ===
(Czech Republic) Jana Novotná defeated (France) Mary Pierce, 7–6, 6–2, 6–3.

- It was Novotná's 4th singles title of the year and the 19th of her career.

=== Doubles ===
(United States) Lindsay Davenport / (Czech Republic) Jana Novotná defeated (France) Alexandra Fusai / (France) Nathalie Tauziat, 6–7, 6–3, 6–2.

- It was Davenport's 13th title of the year and the 31st of her career. It was Novotná's 10th title of the year and the 86th of her career.
