= 1992 Midland Bank Championships – Doubles =

Doubles
- 1992 Midland Bank Championships

Final
- Champions: (Czechoslovakia) Jana Novotná (Latvia) Larisa Savchenko-Neiland
- Runners-up: (Spain) Conchita Martínez (Czechoslovakia) Radka Zrubáková
- Score: 6–4, 6–1

Details
- Draw: 16 (1WC)
- Seeds: 4

Events
Singles	Doubles
← 1991 ·	Brighton International	· 1993 →

Pam Shriver and Natasha Zvereva were the defending champions, but Shriver did not compete this year. Zvereva teamed up with Mary Joe Fernández and lost in the semifinals to Conchita Martínez to Radka Zrubáková.

Jana Novotná and Larisa Savchenko-Neiland won the title by defeating Martínez and Zrubáková 6–4, 6–1 in the final.

== Seeds ==
1. (Czechoslovakia) Jana Novotná / (Latvia) Larisa Savchenko-Neiland (champions)
2. (United States) Mary Joe Fernández / (Commonwealth of Independent States) Natasha Zvereva (semifinals)
3. (United States) Patty Fendick / (Czechoslovakia) Andrea Strnadová (semifinals)
4. (United States) Lori McNeil / (Australia) Elizabeth Smylie (quarterfinals)

== Draw ==
=== Key ===
- Q = Qualifier
- WC = Wild card
- LL = Lucky loser
- Alt = Alternate
- ITF = ITF entry
- PR = Protected ranking
- SR = Special ranking
- SE = Special exempt
- JE = Junior exempt
- JR = Junior Accelerator Programme entrant
- CO = College Accelerator Programme entrant
- NG = Next Gen Accelerator Program entrant
- w/o = Walkover
- r = Retired
- d = Defaulted

=== Draw ===
First round
1	(Czechoslovakia) J Novotná (Latvia) L Savchenko-Neiland	3	6	6
(Peru) L Gildemeister (United Kingdom) C Wood	6	1	0
(United States) K Adams (United States) A Henricksson	6^{6}	7^{8}	4
(United Kingdom) J Durie (Germany) A Huber	7^{8}	6^{6}	6
3	(United States) P Fendick (Czechoslovakia) A Strnadová	6	6
(Germany) E Pfaff (France) N van Lottum	3	4
WC	(United Kingdom) A Grunfeld (United Kingdom) J Salmon	6	6
(Sweden) M Lindström (Sweden) M Strandlund	0	3
(Commonwealth of Independent States) E Brioukhovets (Commonwealth of Independent States) E Maniokova	1	2
(Spain) C Martínez (Czechoslovakia) R Zrubáková	6	6
(France) P Paradis-Mangon (France) C Suire	5	5
4	(United States) L McNeil (Australia) E Smylie	7	7
(Bulgaria) M Maleeva (Netherlands) B Schultz	6	6
(Belgium) S Appelmans (Bulgaria) K Maleeva	3	4
(Commonwealth of Independent States) L Meskhi (Germany) W Probst	2	2
2	(United States) MJ Fernández (Commonwealth of Independent States) N Zvereva	6	6

Quarterfinals
1	(Czechoslovakia) J Novotná (Latvia) L Savchenko-Neiland	w/o
(United Kingdom) J Durie (Germany) A Huber
3	(United States) P Fendick (Czechoslovakia) A Strnadová	6	6
WC	(United Kingdom) A Grunfeld (United Kingdom) J Salmon	0	3
(Spain) C Martínez (Czechoslovakia) R Zrubáková	5	7	6
4	(United States) L McNeil (Australia) E Smylie	7	5	4
(Bulgaria) M Maleeva (Netherlands) B Schultz	6	4	4
2	(United States) MJ Fernández (Commonwealth of Independent States) N Zvereva	4	6	6

Semifinals
1	(Czechoslovakia) J Novotná (Latvia) L Savchenko-Neiland	6	6
3	(United States) P Fendick (Czechoslovakia) A Strnadová	2	3
(Spain) C Martínez (Czechoslovakia) R Zrubáková	6	6
2	(United States) MJ Fernández (Commonwealth of Independent States) N Zvereva	2	4

Final
1	(Czechoslovakia) J Novotná (Latvia) L Savchenko-Neiland	6	6
(Spain) C Martínez (Czechoslovakia) R Zrubáková	4	1
