= 1992 Midland Bank Championships – Singles =

Singles
- 1992 Midland Bank Championships

Final
- Champion: (Germany) Steffi Graf
- Runner-up: (Czechoslovakia) Jana Novotná
- Score: 4–6, 6–4, 7–6^{(7–3)}

Details
- Draw: 32 (2WC/4Q/1LL)
- Seeds: 8

Events
Singles	Doubles
← 1991 ·	Brighton International	· 1993 →

Steffi Graf won her fifth consecutive title at Brighton, by defeating Jana Novotná 4–6, 6–4, 7–6^{(7–3)} in the final.

== Seeds ==
1. (Germany) Steffi Graf (champion)
2. (United States) Mary Joe Fernández (semifinals)
3. (Spain) Conchita Martínez (quarterfinals)
4. (Germany) Anke Huber (semifinals)
5. (Czechoslovakia) Jana Novotná (final)
6. (Bulgaria) Katerina Maleeva (first round)
7. (France) Nathalie Tauziat (quarterfinals)
8. (United States) Lori McNeil (quarterfinals)

== Draw ==
=== Key ===
- Q = Qualifier
- WC = Wild card
- LL = Lucky loser
- Alt = Alternate
- ITF = ITF entry
- PR = Protected ranking
- SR = Special ranking
- SE = Special exempt
- JE = Junior exempt
- JR = Junior Accelerator Programme entrant
- CO = College Accelerator Programme entrant
- NG = Next Gen Accelerator Program entrant
- w/o = Walkover
- r = Retired
- d = Defaulted

=== Finals ===
Semifinals
1	(Germany) Steffi Graf	7	6
4	(Germany) Anke Huber	5	2
5	(Czechoslovakia) Jana Novotná	6	6
2	(United States) Mary Joe Fernández	3	4

Final
1	(Germany) Steffi Graf	4	6	7^{7}
5	(Czechoslovakia) Jana Novotná	6	4	6^{3}

=== Top half ===
First round
1	(Germany) S Graf	6	6
(Latvia) L Savchenko-Neiland	2	3
(Czechoslovakia) A Strnadová	7^{7}	6
WC	(United Kingdom) A Grunfeld	6^{2}	2
(Commonwealth of Independent States) L Meskhi	2	6	6
(Czechoslovakia) R Zrubáková	6	2	2
(Peru) L Gildemeister	6	1	5
8	(United States) L McNeil	4	6	7
4	(Germany) A Huber	6	3	6
(Netherlands) B Schultz	1	6	4
Q	(Bulgaria) L Bacheva	5	4
LL	(Poland) K Nowak	7	6
(Commonwealth of Independent States) E Maniokova	2	6	4
Q	(Sweden) C Dahlman	6	0	6
(France) P Paradis-Mangon	3	6	6
6	(Bulgaria) K Maleeva	6	4	1

Second round
1	(Germany) S Graf	6	6
(Czechoslovakia) A Strnadová	0	4
(Commonwealth of Independent States) L Meskhi	6^{2}	6^{0}
8	(United States) L McNeil	7^{7}	7^{7}
4	(Germany) A Huber	6	6
LL	(Poland) K Nowak	1	2
Q	(Sweden) C Dahlman	4	2
(France) P Paradis-Mangon	6	6

Quarterfinals
1	(Germany) S Graf	6	6
8	(United States) L McNeil	0	2
4	(Germany) A Huber	6	6
(France) P Paradis-Mangon	3	1

Semifinals
1	(Germany) S Graf	7	6
4	(Germany) A Huber	5	2

=== Bottom half ===
First round
5	(Czechoslovakia) J Novotná	6	6
(Canada) P Hy	0	3
(Commonwealth of Independent States) N Zvereva	7	6
(Germany) W Probst	5	3
Q	(United States) K Adams	7^{7}	6
WC	(United Kingdom) SA Siddall	6^{3}	1
(France) N van Lottum	1	1
3	(Spain) C Martínez	6	6
7	(France) N Tauziat	6	6^{2}	6
(United States) P Fendick	3	7^{7}	2
(Belgium) S Appelmans	4	1
(Bulgaria) M Maleeva	6	6
(Finland) P Thorén	1	6^{5}
Q	(South Africa) E Reinach	6	7^{7}
(United Kingdom) J Durie	2^{r}
2	(United States) MJ Fernández	3

Second round
5	(Czechoslovakia) J Novotná	6	6
(Commonwealth of Independent States) N Zvereva	2	0
Q	(United States) K Adams	0	4
3	(Spain) C Martínez	6	6
7	(France) N Tauziat	6	6
(Bulgaria) M Maleeva	1	4
Q	(South Africa) E Reinach	3	0
2	(United States) MJ Fernández	6	6

Quarterfinals
5	(Czechoslovakia) J Novotná	6	6
3	(Spain) C Martínez	4	2
7	(France) N Tauziat	4	3
2	(United States) MJ Fernández	6	6

Semifinals
5	(Czechoslovakia) J Novotná	6	6
2	(United States) MJ Fernández	3	4
