= 1988 United Jersey Bank Classic =

- Date: August 22–28
- Edition: 11th
- Category: Category 3
- Draw: 28S / 16D
- Prize money: $200,000
- Surface: Hard / outdoor
- Location: Mahwah, New Jersey, US

Champions

Singles
- (West Germany) Steffi Graf

Doubles
- (Czechoslovakia) Jana Novotná / (Czechoslovakia) Helena Suková
← 1987 ·	WTA New Jersey	· 1989 →

The 1988 United Jersey Bank Classic was a women's tennis tournament played on outdoor hard courts in Mahwah, New Jersey in the United States and was part of the Category 3 tier of the 1988 WTA Tour. It was the 11th edition of the tournament and was held from August 22 through August 28, 1988. First-seeded Steffi Graf won the singles title, her second at the event after 1986, and earned $40,000 first-prize money.

== Finals ==
=== Singles ===
(West Germany) Steffi Graf defeated (France) Nathalie Tauziat 6–0, 6–1

- It was Graf's 8th singles title of the year and the 27th of her career.

=== Doubles ===
(Czechoslovakia) Jana Novotná / (Czechoslovakia) Helena Suková defeated (United States) Gigi Fernández / (United States) Robin White 6–3, 6–2

- It was Novotná's 6th title of the year and the 10th of her career. It was Suková's 4th title of the year and the 32nd of her career.
