= 1988 United Jersey Bank Classic – Doubles =

Doubles
- 1988 United Jersey Bank Classic
- 1987 Champions: (United States) Gigi Fernández (United States) Lori McNeil

Final
- Champions: (Czechoslovakia) Jana Novotná (Czechoslovakia) Helena Suková
- Runners-up: (United States) Gigi Fernández (United States) Robin White
- Score: 6–3, 6–2

Details
- Draw: 16
- Seeds: 4

Events
| Singles | Doubles |
| ← 1987 · | United Jersey Bank Classic | · 1989 → |

Gigi Fernández and Lori McNeil were the defending champions but only Fernández competed that year with Robin White.

Fernández and White lost in the final 6–3, 6–2 against Jana Novotná and Helena Suková.

== Seeds ==
Champion seeds are indicated in bold text while text in italics indicates the round in which those seeds were eliminated.

1. (Czechoslovakia) **Jana Novotná** / (Czechoslovakia) **Helena Suková (champions)**
2. (Soviet Union) Larisa Savchenko / (Soviet Union) Natasha Zvereva (semifinals)
3. (West Germany) Eva Pfaff / (Australia) Elizabeth Smylie (quarterfinals)
4. (United States) Gigi Fernández / (United States) Robin White (final)

== Draw ==
=== Key ===
- Q = Qualifier
- WC = Wild card
- LL = Lucky loser
- Alt = Alternate
- ITF = ITF entry
- PR = Protected ranking
- SR = Special ranking
- SE = Special exempt
- JE = Junior exempt
- JR = Junior Accelerator Programme entrant
- CO = College Accelerator Programme entrant
- NG = Next Gen Accelerator Program entrant
- w/o = Walkover
- r = Retired
- d = Defaulted

First round
1 | (Czechoslovakia) **J Novotná** (Czechoslovakia) **H Suková** | **6** | **6**
(Australia) N Provis (South Africa) E Reinach | 4 | 4
(France) **A Dechaume** (France) **N Herreman** | **6** | **7**
(Australia) J Byrne (Australia) J Tremelling | 4 | 5
3 | (West Germany) **E Pfaff** (Australia) **E Smylie** | **6** | **6**
(United Kingdom) J Durie (France) C Suire | 2 | 4
(United States) **T Austin** (United States) **S Rehe** | **7** | **7**
(France) I Demongeot (France) N Tauziat | 6 | 6
(Soviet Union) **N Bykova** (Soviet Union) **L Meskhi** | 2 | **7** | **6**
(United States) B Herr (Sweden) M Lindström | **6** | 6 | 4
(West Germany) C Porwik (South Africa) D van Rensburg | **6** | 6 | 4
4 | (United States) **G Fernández** (United States) **R White** | 3 | **7** | **6**
(United States) **L Antonoplis** (United States) **S Collins** | 2 | **7** | **6**
(United States) T Phelps (Italy) R Reggi | **6** | 5 | 2
(Bulgaria) K Maleeva (Bulgaria) M Maleeva | **6** | 4 | 4
2 | (Soviet Union) **L Savchenko** (Soviet Union) **N Zvereva** | 4 | **6** | **6**

Quarterfinals
1 | (Czechoslovakia) **J Novotná** (Czechoslovakia) **H Suková** | **6** | **6**
(France) A Dechaume (France) N Herreman | 0 | 3
3 | (West Germany) E Pfaff (Australia) E Smylie | **6** | 5 | 6
(United States) **T Austin** (United States) **S Rehe** | 2 | **7** | **7**
(Soviet Union) N Bykova (Soviet Union) L Meskhi | 4 | 3
4 | (United States) **G Fernández** (United States) **R White** | **6** | **6**
(United States) L Antonoplis (United States) S Collins | **7** | 3 | 4
2 | (Soviet Union) **L Savchenko** (Soviet Union) **N Zvereva** | 6 | **6** | **6**

Semifinals
1 | (Czechoslovakia) **J Novotná** (Czechoslovakia) **H Suková** | **6** | **6**
(United States) T Austin (United States) S Rehe | 3 | 1
4 | (United States) **G Fernández** (United States) **R White** | **6** | **6**
2 | (Soviet Union) L Savchenko (Soviet Union) N Zvereva | 1 | 2

Final
1 | (Czechoslovakia) **Jana Novotná** (Czechoslovakia) **Helena Suková** | **6** | **6**
4 | (United States) Gigi Fernández (United States) Robin White | 3 | 2
