= 1993 Autoglass Classic =

- Date: 19–24 October
- Edition: 16th
- Category: Tier II
- Draw: 32S / 16D
- Prize money: $375,000
- Surface: Carpet (Supreme) / indoor
- Location: Brighton, England
- Venue: Brighton Centre

Champions

Singles
- (Czech Republic) Jana Novotná

Doubles
- (Italy) Laura Golarsa / (Ukraine) Natalia Medvedeva
← 1992 ·	Brighton International	· 1994 →

The 1993 Autoglass Classic was a women's tennis tournament played on indoor carpet courts at the Brighton Centre in Brighton, England that was part of the Tier II of the 1993 WTA Tour. It was the 16th edition of the tournament and was held from 19 October until 24 October 1993. First-seeded Jana Novotná won the singles title and earned $70,000 first-prize money.

== Finals ==
=== Singles ===
(Czech Republic) Jana Novotná defeated (Germany) Anke Huber 6–2, 6–4

- It was Novotná's 2nd singles title of the year and the 7th of her career.

=== Doubles ===
(Italy) Laura Golarsa / (Ukraine) Natalia Medvedeva defeated (Germany) Anke Huber / (Latvia) Larisa Neiland 6–3, 1–6, 6–4
