= 1991 Midland Bank Championships – Singles =

Singles
- 1991 Midland Bank Championships

Final
- Champion: (Germany) Steffi Graf
- Runner-up: (United States) Zina Garrison
- Score: 5–7, 6–4, 6–1

Details
- Draw: 32 (4Q/1LL)
- Seeds: 8

Events
Singles	Doubles
← 1990 ·	Brighton International	· 1992 →

Steffi Graf won her fourth consecutive title at Brighton, by defeating Zina Garrison 5–7, 6–4, 6–1 in the final.

== Seeds ==
1. (Germany) Steffi Graf (champion)
2. (Bulgaria) Katerina Maleeva (quarterfinals)
3. (United States) Zina Garrison (final)
4. (France) Nathalie Tauziat (quarterfinals, withdrew)
5. (Austria) Barbara Paulus (semifinals)
6. (Soviet Union) Natasha Zvereva (second round)
7. (United States) Lori McNeil (quarterfinals)
8. (Czechoslovakia) Radka Zrubáková (quarterfinals)

== Draw ==
=== Key ===
- Q = Qualifier
- WC = Wild card
- LL = Lucky loser
- Alt = Alternate
- ITF = ITF entry
- PR = Protected ranking
- SR = Special ranking
- SE = Special exempt
- JE = Junior exempt
- JR = Junior Accelerator Programme entrant
- CO = College Accelerator Programme entrant
- NG = Next Gen Accelerator Program entrant
- w/o = Walkover
- r = Retired
- d = Defaulted

=== Finals ===
Semifinals
1	(Germany) Steffi Graf	7	6
5	(Austria) Barbara Paulus	5	1
3	(United States) Zina Garrison	6	1
(Sweden) Catarina Lindqvist	1	0^{r}

Final
1	(Germany) Steffi Graf	5	6	6
3	(United States) Zina Garrison	7	4	1

=== Top half ===
First round
1	(Germany) S Graf	7^{7}	6
Q	(United States) K Adams	6^{5}	3
(Czechoslovakia) A Strnadová	6	6
(Australia) R McQuillan	3	4
(Germany) W Probst	2	6	2
Q	(Soviet Union) E Maniokova	6	3	6
(Netherlands) B Schultz	4	3
7	(United States) L McNeil	6	6
4	(France) N Tauziat	6	7^{7}
(United Kingdom) S Gomer	3	6^{4}
(France) P Paradis-Mangon	6	6
(Luxembourg) K Kschwendt	2	3
Q	(Belgium) D Monami	1	0
(United Kingdom) M Javer	6	6
(Netherlands) N Jagerman	5	2
5	(Austria) B Paulus	7	6

Second round
1	(Germany) S Graf	6	6
(Czechoslovakia) A Strnadová	2	3
Q	(Soviet Union) E Maniokova	6^{6}	3
7	(United States) L McNeil	7^{8}	6
4	(France) N Tauziat	6	6
(France) P Paradis-Mangon	4	3
(United Kingdom) M Javer	6	2	2
5	(Austria) B Paulus	2	6	6

Quarterfinals
1	(Germany) S Graf	7	6
7	(United States) L McNeil	5	2
4	(France) N Tauziat
5	(Austria) B Paulus	w/o

Semifinals
1	(Germany) S Graf	7	6
5	(Austria) B Paulus	5	1

=== Bottom half ===
First round
8	(Czechoslovakia) R Zrubáková	7^{7}	6
(France) C Tanvier	6^{2}	2
(Bulgaria) M Maleeva	6	6
(Hungary) A Temesvári	1	0
(South Africa) R Fairbank-Nideffer	7^{7}	6
(United States) P Shriver	6^{5}	2
Q	(Germany) E Pfaff	1	3
3	(United States) Z Garrison	6	6
6	(Soviet Union) N Zvereva	6	6
(South Africa) E Reinach	4	2
(Sweden) C Lindqvist	6	7
LL	(United Kingdom) C Wood	0	5
(Italy) R Reggi-Concato	6	1	0
(United Kingdom) J Durie	4	6	6
(Czechoslovakia) P Langrová	4	3
2	(Bulgaria) K Maleeva	6	6

Second round
8	(Czechoslovakia) R Zrubáková	6	6
(Bulgaria) M Maleeva	2	4
(South Africa) R Fairbank-Nideffer	4	4
3	(United States) Z Garrison	6	6
6	(Soviet Union) N Zvereva	4	4
(Sweden) C Lindqvist	6	6
(United Kingdom) J Durie	4	4
2	(Bulgaria) K Maleeva	6	6

Quarterfinals
8	(Czechoslovakia) R Zrubáková	3	2
3	(United States) Z Garrison	6	6
(Sweden) C Lindqvist	6	7^{7}
2	(Bulgaria) K Maleeva	2	6^{3}

Semifinals
3	(United States) Z Garrison	6	1
(Sweden) C Lindqvist	1	0^{r}
