= 1989 United Jersey Bank Classic – Singles =

Singles
- 1989 United Jersey Bank Classic

Final
- Champion: (West Germany) Steffi Graf
- Runner-up: (Hungary) Andrea Temesvári
- Score: 7–5, 6–2

Details
- Draw: 32
- Seeds: 8

Events
Singles	Doubles
← 1988 ·	United Jersey Bank Classic

Steffi Graf was the defending champion and won in the final 7–5, 6–2 against Andrea Temesvári.

== Seeds ==
A champion seed is indicated in bold text while text in italics indicates the round in which that seed was eliminated.

1. (West Germany) **Steffi Graf (champion)**
2. (United States) Pam Shriver (second round)
3. (Czechoslovakia) Jana Novotná (first round)
4. (Bulgaria) Katerina Maleeva (second round)
5. (Australia) Hana Mandlíková (quarterfinals)
6. (Sweden) Catarina Lindqvist (second round)
7. (United States) Terry Phelps (second round)
8. (West Germany) Sylvia Hanika (quarterfinals)

== Draw ==
=== Key ===
- Q = Qualifier
- WC = Wild card
- LL = Lucky loser
- Alt = Alternate
- SE = Special exempt
- PR = Protected ranking
- ITF = ITF entry
- JE = Junior exempt
- w/o = Walkover
- r = Retired
- d = Defaulted
- SR = Special ranking

First round
1	(West Germany) **S Graf**	**6**	**6**
(United States) K Kessaris	0	0
(Japan) **E Inoue**	**6**	**6**
(United States) W White	2	4
(Australia) L Field	3	3
(United States) **A Leand**	**6**	**6**
(Bulgaria) M Maleeva	4	2
5	(Australia) **H Mandlíková**	**6**	**6**
3	(Czechoslovakia) J Novotná	**6**	2	4
(United States) **K Rinaldi**	1	**6**	**6**
(Czechoslovakia) P Langrová	5	**6**	2
(Italy) **L Ferrando**	**7**	4	**6**
(Peru) **L Gildemeister**	**6**	**6**
(United States) M Van Nostrand	2	2
(Czechoslovakia) E Švíglerová	2	4
7	(United States) **T Phelps**	**6**	**6**
6	(Sweden) **C Lindqvist**	**7**	2	**6**
(United States) C Cunningham	5	**6**	4
(France) **P Paradis**	6	**6**	**6**
(Switzerland) E Krapl	**7**	4	3
(United States) B Herr	**6**	4	0
(Hungary) **A Temesvári**	1	**6**	**6**
(United States) M L Daniels	1	1
4	(Bulgaria) **K Maleeva**	**6**	**6**
8	(West Germany) **S Hanika**	2	**6**	**7**
(United States) D Faber	**6**	2	5
(United States) **M McGrath**	2	**6**	**7**
(France) S Amiach	**6**	2	5
(Japan) K Okamoto	1	1
(United States) **S Martin**	**6**	**6**
(United States) L Allen	2	2
2	(United States) **P Shriver**	**6**	**6**

Second round
1	(West Germany) **S Graf**	**6**	**6**
(Japan) E Inoue	1	1
(United States) A Leand	0	6
5	(Australia) **H Mandlíková**	**6**	**7**
(United States) K Rinaldi	1	1
(Italy) **L Ferrando**	**6**	**6**
(Peru) **L Gildemeister**	2	**6**	**6**
7	(United States) T Phelps	**6**	1	3
6	(Sweden) C Lindqvist	3	1
(France) **P Paradis**	**6**	**6**
(Hungary) **A Temesvári**	**6**	5	**6**
4	(Bulgaria) K Maleeva	4	**7**	4
8	(West Germany) **S Hanika**	**6**	**7**
(United States) M McGrath	2	5
(United States) **S Martin**	**6**	1	**6**
2	(United States) P Shriver	1	**6**	4

Quarterfinals
1	(West Germany) **S Graf**	**6**	**6**
5	(Australia) H Mandlíková	0	1
(Italy) **L Ferrando**	**6**	3	**6**
(Peru) L Gildemeister	4	**6**	4
(France) P Paradis	3	4
(Hungary) **A Temesvári**	**6**	**6**
8	(West Germany) S Hanika	3	5
(United States) **S Martin**	**6**	**7**

Semifinals
1	(West Germany) **S Graf**	**6**	**6**
(Italy) L Ferrando	1	2
(Hungary) **A Temesvári**	**6**	4	**7**
(United States) S Martin	4	**6**	5

Final
1	(West Germany) **Steffi Graf**	**7**	**6**
(Hungary) Andrea Temesvári	5	2
