= 1988 United Jersey Bank Classic – Singles =

Singles
- 1988 United Jersey Bank Classic

Final
- Champion: (West Germany) Steffi Graf
- Runner-up: (France) Nathalie Tauziat
- Score: 6–0, 6–1

Details
- Draw: 28
- Seeds: 8

Events
Singles	Doubles
← 1987 ·	United Jersey Bank Classic	· 1989 →

Manuela Maleeva was the defending champion but lost in the second round to Catarina Lindqvist.

Steffi Graf won in the final 6–0, 6–1 against Nathalie Tauziat.

== Seeds ==
A champion seed is indicated in bold text while text in italics indicates the round in which that seed was eliminated. The top four seeds received a bye to the second round.

1. (West Germany) **Steffi Graf (champion)**
2. (Bulgaria) Manuela Maleeva (second round)
3. (Czechoslovakia) Helena Suková (semifinals)
4. (Soviet Union) Natasha Zvereva (quarterfinals)
5. (Bulgaria) Katerina Maleeva (semifinals)
6. (West Germany) Sylvia Hanika (quarterfinals)
7. (Soviet Union) Larisa Savchenko (first round)
8. (United States) Stephanie Rehe (quarterfinals)

== Draw ==
=== Key ===
- Q = Qualifier
- WC = Wild card
- LL = Lucky loser
- Alt = Alternate
- SE = Special exempt
- PR = Protected ranking
- ITF = ITF entry
- JE = Junior exempt
- w/o = Walkover
- r = Retired
- d = Defaulted
- SR = Special ranking

=== Final ===
Final
1	(West Germany) **Steffi Graf**	**6**	**6**
	(France) Nathalie Tauziat	0	1

=== Section 1 ===
First round
(Spain) **A Sánchez**	**6**	**6**
(United Kingdom) J Durie	2	2
(Australia) **D Balestrat**	2	**6**	**7**
(Australia) N Provis	**6**	4	5
(Italy) R Reggi	2	3
6	(West Germany) **S Hanika**	**6**	**6**
(Austria) J Wiesner	**6**	4	1
Q	(France) **I Demongeot**	4	**6**	**6**
(Soviet Union) L Meskhi	2	3
(Italy) **S Cecchini**	**6**	**6**
LL	(South Africa) D Van Rensburg	2	**7**	3
8	(United States) **S Rehe**	**6**	6	**6**

Second round
1	(West Germany) **S Graf**	**6**	**6**
(Spain) A Sánchez	2	0
(Australia) D Balestrat	4	2
6	(West Germany) **S Hanika**	**6**	**6**
3	(Czechoslovakia) **H Suková**	**6**	**6**
Q	(France) I Demongeot	2	2
(Italy) S Cecchini	6	**6**	1
8	(United States) **S Rehe**	**7**	3	**6**

Quarterfinals
1	(West Germany) **S Graf**	**6**	**6**
6	(West Germany) S Hanika	2	1
3	(Czechoslovakia) **H Suková**	**7**	**6**
8	(United States) S Rehe	5	3

Semifinals
1	(West Germany) **S Graf**	**6**	**6**
3	(Czechoslovakia) H Suková	1	1

=== Section 2 ===
First round
7	(Soviet Union) L Savchenko	6	2
Q	(France) **J Halard**	**7**	**6**
Q	(Japan) E Inoue	**6**	0	2
(France) **N Tauziat**	4	**6**	**6**
(United States) A Grossman	1	1
(South Africa) **E Reinach**	**6**	**6**
5	(Bulgaria) **K Maleeva**	**6**	**6**
(United States) G Fernández	4	2
Q	(New Zealand) B Cordwell	5	**6**	5
(Argentina) **B Fulco**	**7**	4	**7**
(Sweden) **C Lindqvist**	**6**	**6**
(Czechoslovakia) J Novotná	3	4

Second round
Q	(France) J Halard	4	1
(France) **N Tauziat**	**6**	**6**
(South Africa) E Reinach	4	0
4	(Soviet Union) **N Zvereva**	**6**	**6**
5	(Bulgaria) **K Maleeva**	**6**	**6**
(Argentina) B Fulco	0	2
(Sweden) **C Lindqvist**	**7**	6	**6**
2	(Bulgaria) M Maleeva	5	**7**	3

Quarterfinals
(France) **N Tauziat**	3	**6**	**6**
4	(Soviet Union) N Zvereva	**6**	2	3
5	(Bulgaria) **K Maleeva**	**6**	**6**
(Sweden) C Lindqvist	1	2

Semifinals
(France) **N Tauziat**	**6**	**6**
5	(Bulgaria) K Maleeva	4	3

== See also ==
- United States Tennis Association
