= 1991 Midland Bank Championships – Doubles =

Doubles
- 1991 Midland Bank Championships

Final
- Champions: (United States) Pam Shriver (Soviet Union) Natasha Zvereva
- Runners-up: (United States) Zina Garrison (United States) Lori McNeil
- Score: 6–1, 6–2

Details
- Draw: 16
- Seeds: 4

Events
Singles	Doubles
← 1990 ·	Brighton International	· 1992 →

Helena Suková and Nathalie Tauziat were the defending champions, but Suková did not compete this year. Tauziat teamed up with Catherine Suire and lost in the first round to Pam Shriver and Natasha Zvereva.

Shriver and Zvereva won the title by defeating Zina Garrison and Lori McNeil 6–1, 6–2 in the final.

== Seeds ==
1. (United States) Pam Shriver / (Soviet Union) Natasha Zvereva (champions)
2. (United States) Zina Garrison / (United States) Lori McNeil (final)
3. (United States) Sandy Collins / (South Africa) Elna Reinach (semifinals)
4. (Italy) Raffaella Reggi-Concato / (Czechoslovakia) Andrea Strnadová (quarterfinals)

== Draw ==
=== Key ===
- Q = Qualifier
- WC = Wild card
- LL = Lucky loser
- Alt = Alternate
- ITF = ITF entry
- PR = Protected ranking
- SR = Special ranking
- SE = Special exempt
- JE = Junior exempt
- JR = Junior Accelerator Programme entrant
- CO = College Accelerator Programme entrant
- NG = Next Gen Accelerator Program entrant
- w/o = Walkover
- r = Retired
- d = Defaulted

=== Draw ===
First round
1	(United States) P Shriver (Soviet Union) N Zvereva	6	6
(France) C Suire (France) N Tauziat	4	2
(United States) K Adams (Bulgaria) K Maleeva	7^{9}	6
(France) N Herreman (France) P Paradis-Mangon	6^{7}	1
3	(United States) S Collins (South Africa) E Reinach	6^{5}	6	7^{7}
(Netherlands) N Jagerman (United States) H Ludloff	7^{7}	2	6^{4}
(Sweden) M Lindström (Hungary) A Temesvári	2	2
(United Kingdom) J Durie (South Africa) R Fairbank-Nideffer	6	6
(Australia) R McQuillan (Germany) W Probst	6	6
(United Kingdom) S Gomer (United Kingdom) V Lake	4	4
(Czechoslovakia) P Langrová (Czechoslovakia) R Zrubakóvá	3	2
4	(Italy) R Reggi-Concato (Czechoslovakia) A Strnadová	6	6
(United Kingdom) B Borneo (United Kingdom) C Wood	2	7^{7}	6
(Luxembourg) K Kschwendt (Netherlands) B Schultz	6	6^{5}	4
(Germany) F Pfaff (France) C Tanvier	1^{r}
2	(United States) Z Garrison (United States) L McNeil	3

Quarterfinals
1	(United States) P Shriver (Soviet Union) N Zvereva	4	6	7
(United States) K Adams (Bulgaria) K Maleeva	6	3	5
3	(United States) S Collins (South Africa) E Reinach	6	4	6
(United Kingdom) J Durie (South Africa) R Fairbank-Nideffer	1	6	3
(Australia) R McQuillan (Germany) W Probst	7	6
4	(Italy) R Reggi-Concato (Czechoslovakia) A Strnadová	5	4
(United Kingdom) B Borneo (United Kingdom) C Wood
2	(United States) Z Garrison (United States) L McNeil	w/o

Semifinals
1	(United States) P Shriver (Soviet Union) N Zvereva	7	6
3	(United States) S Collins (South Africa) E Reinach	5	1
(Australia) R McQuillan (Germany) W Probst	1	0
2	(United States) Z Garrison (United States) L McNeil	6	6

Final
1	(United States) P Shriver (Soviet Union) N Zvereva	6	6
2	(United States) Z Garrison (United States) L McNeil	1	2
