= 1993 Autoglass Classic – Doubles =

Doubles
- 1993 Autoglass Classic

Final
- Champions: (Italy) Laura Golarsa; (Ukraine) Natalia Medvedeva
- Runners-up: (Germany) Anke Huber; (Latvia) Larisa Neiland
- Score: 6–3, 1–6, 6–4

Details
- Draw: 16 (4WC/1Q)
- Seeds: 4

Events
Singles	Doubles
← 1992 ·	Brighton International	· 1994 →

Jana Novotná and Larisa Neiland were the defending champions, but Novotná chose to focus only on the singles tournament, winning the title.

Neiland teamed up with Anke Huber and lost in the final to Laura Golarsa and Natalia Medvedeva. The score was 6–3, 1–6, 6–4.

== Seeds ==
1. (United States) Patty Fendick / (Australia) Elizabeth Smylie (semifinals)
2. (United States) Katrina Adams / (Netherlands) Manon Bollegraf (quarterfinals)
3. (Germany) Anke Huber / (Latvia) Larisa Neiland (final)
4. (South Africa) Elna Reinach / (Czech Republic) Andrea Strnadová (semifinals)

== Draw ==
=== Key ===
- Q = Qualifier
- WC = Wild card
- LL = Lucky loser
- Alt = Alternate
- SE = Special exempt
- PR = Protected ranking
- ITF = ITF entry
- JE = Junior exempt
- w/o = Walkover
- r = Retired
- d = Defaulted
- SR = Special ranking

=== Draw ===
First round

Quarterfinals

Semifinals

Final

1
(United States) P Fendick
(Australia) E Smylie
6
6

- (Sweden) M Lindström
- (United States) H Ludloff
2
1

1
(United States) P Fendick
(Australia) E Smylie
6
1
6

(United Kingdom) V Lake
(United Kingdom) C Wood
7^{7}
2
7

- (United Kingdom) V Lake
- (United Kingdom) C Wood
3
6
4

Q
- (United Kingdom) J Salmon
- (United Kingdom) L Woodroffe
6^{5}
6
5

1
- (United States) P Fendick
- (Australia) E Smylie
4
4

3
(Germany) A Huber
(Latvia) L Neiland
6
6

3
(Germany) A Huber
(Latvia) L Neiland
6
6

- (United States) N Arendt
- (Georgia (country)) L Meskhi
4
3

3
(Germany) A Huber
(Latvia) L Neiland
6
6

- (United States) A Frazier
- (Japan) R Hiraki
4
2

- (Germany) C Singer
- (Romania) I Spîrlea
1
1

(Germany) C Singer
(Romania) I Spîrlea
6
6

3
- (Germany) A Huber
- (Latvia) L Neiland
3
6
4

WC
- (United Kingdom) SA Siddall
- (United Kingdom) A Wainwright
3
0

(Italy) L Golarsa
(Ukraine) N Medvedeva
6
1
6

(United Kingdom) J Durie
(United States) G Helgeson
6
6

- (United Kingdom) J Durie
- (United States) G Helgeson
3
6^{2}

- (United States) A Henricksson
- (Austria) P Ritter
1
7^{7}
1

4
(South Africa) E Reinach
(Czech Republic) A Strnadová
6
7^{7}

4
(South Africa) E Reinach
(Czech Republic) A Strnadová
6
6^{4}
6

4
- (South Africa) E Reinach
- (Czech Republic) A Strnadová
5
3

- (Belgium) N Feber
- (Germany) R Kochta
4
1

(Italy) L Golarsa
(Ukraine) N Medvedeva
7
6

(Italy) L Golarsa
(Ukraine) N Medvedeva
6
6

(Italy) L Golarsa
(Ukraine) N Medvedeva
6
3
6

- (United States) A deLone
- (United States) E deLone
3
7^{8}
1

2
- (United States) K Adams
- (Netherlands) M Bollegraf
4
6
4

2
(United States) K Adams
(Netherlands) M Bollegraf
6
6^{6}
6
