= 1990 Midland Bank Championships – Doubles =

Doubles
- 1990 Midland Bank Championships

Final
- Champions: (Czechoslovakia) Helena Suková (France) Nathalie Tauziat
- Runners-up: (United Kingdom) Jo Durie (Soviet Union) Natasha Zvereva
- Score: 6–1, 6–4

Details
- Draw: 16
- Seeds: 4

Events
| Singles | Doubles |
| ← 1989 · | Brighton International | · 1991 → |

Katrina Adams and Lori McNeil were the defending champions, but both players chose to compete at Dorado, Puerto Rico during the same week, playing with different partners.

Helena Suková and Nathalie Tauziat won the title by defeating Jo Durie and Natasha Zvereva 6–1, 6–4 in the final.

== Seeds ==
1. (Czechoslovakia) Helena Suková / (France) Nathalie Tauziat (champions)
2. (United Kingdom) Jo Durie / (Soviet Union) Natasha Zvereva (final)
3. (n/a)
4. (Italy) Sandra Cecchini / (Italy) Laura Garrone (first round)

== Draw ==
=== Key ===
- Q = Qualifier
- WC = Wild card
- LL = Lucky loser
- Alt = Alternate
- SE = Special exempt
- PR = Protected ranking
- ITF = ITF entry
- JE = Junior exempt
- w/o = Walkover
- r = Retired
- d = Defaulted
- SR = Special ranking

=== Draw ===
First round
1 | (Czechoslovakia) H Suková (France) N Tauziat | 6 | 6
(Netherlands) G Coorengel (Netherlands) A van Buuren | 1 | 2
(Switzerland) C Caverzasio (France) N Herreman | 6 | 3 | 6
(United Kingdom) S Gomer (United Kingdom) S Loosemore | 3 | 6 | 4
4 | (Italy) S Cecchini (Italy) L Garrone | 2 | 6 | 6
(Bulgaria) K Maleeva (Bulgaria) M Maleeva | 6 | 4 | 7
(United Kingdom) B Borneo (United Kingdom) J Salmon | 1 | 3
(South Africa) R Field (United Kingdom) C Wood | 6 | 6
(United States) J Smoller (Peru) P Vásquez | 3 | 6 | 4
(Belgium) S Appelmans (Belgium) A Devries | 6 | 3 | 6
(United Kingdom) A Rosenfield (United Kingdom) K Hand | 3 | 2
(Australia) R McQuillan (France) C Tanvier | 6 | 6
(Soviet Union) V Milvidskaia (Austria) H Sprung | 3 | 7 | 6
(Switzerland) C Cohen (Czechoslovakia) D Krajčovičová | 6 | 5 | 3
(United States) D Faber (Finland) P Thorén | 0 | 3
2 | (United Kingdom) J Durie (Soviet Union) N Zvereva | 6 | 6

Quarterfinals
1 | (Czechoslovakia) H Suková (France) N Tauziat | 6 | 6
(Switzerland) C Caverzasio (France) N Herreman | 1 | 4
(Bulgaria) K Maleeva (Bulgaria) M Maleeva | 6 | 6
(South Africa) R Field (United Kingdom) C Wood | 3 | 4
(Belgium) S Appelmans (Belgium) A Devries | 1 | 6 | 6
(Australia) R McQuillan (France) C Tanvier | 6 | 4 | 4
(Soviet Union) V Milvidskaia (Austria) H Sprung | 0 | 1
2 | (United Kingdom) J Durie (Soviet Union) N Zvereva | 6 | 6

Semifinals
1 | (Czechoslovakia) H Suková (France) N Tauziat | 6 | 0 | 6
(Bulgaria) K Maleeva (Bulgaria) M Maleeva | 2 | 6 | 0
(Belgium) S Appelmans (Belgium) A Devries | 2 | 3
2 | (United Kingdom) J Durie (Soviet Union) N Zvereva | 6 | 6

Final
1 | (Czechoslovakia) H Suková (France) N Tauziat | 6 | 6
2 | (United Kingdom) J Durie (Soviet Union) N Zvereva | 1 | 4
