= 1991 Midland Bank Championships =

Women's tennis tournament

- Date: 22–27 October
- Edition: 14th
- Category: Tier II
- Draw: 32S / 16D
- Prize money: $350,000
- Surface: Carpet (Supreme) / indoor
- Location: Brighton, England
- Venue: Brighton Centre

Champions

Singles
- (Germany) Steffi Graf

Doubles
- (United States) Pam Shriver / (Soviet Union) Natasha Zvereva
← 1990 ·	Brighton International	· 1992 →

The 1991 Midland Group Championships was a women's tennis tournament played on indoor carpet courts at the Brighton Centre in Brighton, England that was part of the Tier II of the 1991 WTA Tour. It was the 14th edition of the tournament and was held from 22 October until 27 October 1991. First-seeded Steffi Graf won the singles title, her fourth consecutive at the event and fifth in total, and earned $70,000 first-prize money.

== Finals ==
=== Singles ===
(Germany) Steffi Graf defeated (United States) Zina Garrison 5–7, 6–4, 6–1

- It was Graf's 7th singles title of the year and the 61st of her career.

=== Doubles ===
(United States) Pam Shriver / (Soviet Union) Natasha Zvereva defeated (United States) Zina Garrison / (United States) Lori McNeil 6–1, 6–2
