= Steffi Graf career statistics =

Career finals
Discipline	Type	Won	Lost	Total	WR
Singles	Grand Slam	22	9	31	.71
Singles	Year-end championships	5	1	6	.83
Singles	WTA Premier Mandatory *	18	6	24	.75
Singles	Summer Olympics	1	1	2	.50
Singles	WTA Tour	61	14	75	.81
Singles	Total	107	31	138	.78
Doubles	Grand Slam	1	3	4	.25
Doubles	Year-end championships	–	–	–	–
Doubles	WTA Premier Mandatory *	1	0	1	1.00
Doubles	Summer Olympics	–	–	–	–
Doubles	WTA Tour	9	4	13	.69
Doubles	Total	11	7	18	.61
Total		118	38	156	.76
(1) WR = winning rate (2) * formerly known as "Tier I" tournaments.

The career of German former professional tennis player Steffi Graf ran from 1982 until her retirement in 1999. Graf won 107 career singles titles including 22 Grand Slam singles titles. In 1988 she became the first tennis player to achieve the Golden Slam by winning all four Grand Slam titles as well as the Olympic gold medal in the same calendar year. Graf was ranked as the world No. 1 in singles for a record 377 weeks, and finished as the year-end No. 1 a record eight times.

== Performance timelines ==
Key
W	F	SF	QF	#R	RR	Q#	DNQ	A	NH

(W) winner; (F) finalist; (SF) semifinalist; (QF) quarterfinalist; (#R) rounds 4, 3, 2, 1; (RR) round-robin stage; (Q#) qualification round; (DNQ) did not qualify; (A) absent; (NH) not held; (SR) strike rate (events won / competed); (W–L) win–loss record.

Only results in WTA Tour (incl. Grand Slams) main-draw, Olympic Games and Fed Cup are included in win–loss records.

=== Singles ===
	West Germany										Germany										
Tournament	1982	1983	1984	1985	1986		1987	1988	1989	1990	1991	1992	1993	1994	1995	1996	1997	1998	1999	SR	W–L
Grand Slam tournaments
Australian Open	A	1R	3R	A	NH		A	W	W	W	QF	A	F	W	A	A	4R	A	QF	4 / 10	47–6
French Open	A	2R	3R	4R	QF		W	W	F	F	SF	F	W	SF	W	W	QF	A	W	6 / 16	84–10
Wimbledon	A	Q2	4R	4R	A		F	W	W	SF	W	W	W	1R	W	W	A	3R	F	7 / 14	74–7
US Open	A	Q1	1R	SF	SF		F	W	W	F	SF	QF	W	F	W	W	A	4R	A	5 / 14	73–9
Win–loss	0–0	1–2	7–4	11–3	9–2		19–2	27–0	27–1	24–3	21–3	17–2	26–1	18–3	21–0	21–0	7–2	5–2	17–2	22 / 54	278–32
Year-end championship
WTA Championships	did not qualify				SF	F	W	SF	W	SF	QF	1R	W	QF	W	W	DNQ	SF	DNQ	5 / 13	33–8
National representation
Summer Olympics	not held		G (Note: Tennis was a demonstration sport during the 1984 Olympic Games. (not considered in win–loss records))	not held				G	not held			S	not held			A	not held			1 / 2	10–1
Fed Cup	A	A	A	A	SF		W	A	QF	A	SF	W	1R	A	A	1R	A	A	A	2 / 7	20–2
Tier I tournaments
Berlin	not Tier I							W	W	F	W	W	W	W	A	W	QF	A	QF	7 / 10	43–3
Miami	not held			not Tier I				W	A	A	SF	SF	F	W	W	W	A	A	SF	4 / 8	41–4
Canada	not Tier I									W	A	A	W	F	2R	A	A	3R	A	2 / 5	15–3
Charleston	not Tier I									A	A	A	W	A	A	A	A	A	A	1 / 1	5–0
Boca Raton	not held		not Tier I								F	W	not Tier I			not held				1 / 2	8–1
Philadelphia	not Tier I												F	A	W	not Tier I				1 / 2	8–1
Indian Wells	not held								not Tier I							W	A	SF	F	1 / 3	12–2
Tokyo	not held		not Tier I										SF	W	A	A	F (Note: Graf defaulted before the 1997 final of this tournament, which is classified as a walkover and, therefore, does not count as a loss on her official record.)	A	QF	1 / 4	13–2
Rome	not Tier I				NH		not Tier I			A	A	A	A	A	A	QF	A	A	A	0 / 1	2–1
Career statistics
Tournament	1982	1983	1984	1985	1986		1987	1988	1989	1990	1991	1992	1993	1994	1995	1996	1997	1998	1999	Career	
Tournaments	1	7	13	13	14		13	14	16	15	15	15	15	13	11	11	5	13	10	214	
Titles	0	0	0	0	8		11	11	14	10	7	8	10	7	9	7	1	3	1	107	
Finals	0	0	1	3	11		13	12	16	13	9	11	14	10	9	8	2	3	3	138	
Hardcourt win–loss	0–0	1–1	1–2	19–6	20–3		28–1	38–1	37–0	23–1	23–4	13–2	32–2	38–2	17–1	22–2	3–1	14–5	14–5	343–39	
Clay win–loss	0–0	2–2	5–5	14–4	25–1		32–0	20–1	23–2	20–2	19–2	30–3	21–2	14–2	11–0	16–1	10–2	0–0	9–1	271–30	
Grass win–loss	0–0	2–3	7–4	3–1	0–0		6–1	7–0	7–0	5–1	7–0	7–0	7–0	0–1	7–0	7–0	0–0	6–2	6–1	84–14	
Carpet win–loss	0–1	1–1	4–2	4–2	19–2		9–0	7–1	19–0	24–1	16–2	21–2	16–2	6–1	12–1	9–1	3–0	13–2	4–2	187–23	
Overall win–loss	0–1	6–7	17–13	40–13	64–6		75–2	72–3	86–2	72–5	65–8	71–7	76–6	58–6	47–2	54–4	16–3	33–9	33–9	885–106	
Win %	0%	46%	57%	75%	91%		97%	96%	98%	94%	89%	91%	93%	91%	96%	93%	84%	79%	79%	89%	
Year-end ranking	124	90	22	6	3		1	1	1	1	2	2	1	1	1	1	28	9	N/A		

Notes:

- Only results in WTA Tour (incl. Grand Slams) main-draw, Olympic Games and Fed Cup are included in win–loss records.
- Graf retired in August 1999 while ranked world No. 3, She was not included in the official year end ranking.

=== Doubles ===
Tournament	1984	1985	1986	1987	1988	1989	1990	1991	1992	1993	1994	1995	1996	1997	1998	1999	SR	W–L
Grand Slam tournaments
Australian Open	1R	A	NH	A	SF	SF	2R	A	A	A	2R	A	A	A	A	2R	0 / 6	11–5
French Open	2R	1R	F	F	SF	F	A	A	SF	A	A	A	A	A	A	A	0 / 7	24–7
Wimbledon	1R	1R	A	3R	W	QF	QF	1R	A	A	A	A	A	A	A	A	1 / 7	14–6
US Open	2R	2R	SF	SF	SF	SF	QF	A	A	A	A	A	A	A	A	A	0 / 7	21–6
Win–loss	2–4	1–3	9–2	11–2	18–3	16–4	7–2	0–1	4–1	0–0	1–1	0–0	0–0	0–0	0–0	1–1	1 / 27	70–24
Year-end championship
WTA Championships	DNQ		SF	SF	SF	did not qualify											0 / 3	3–2
National representation
Summer Olympics	not held				SF-B	not held			2R	not held			A	not held			0 / 2	2–2
Fed Cup	A	A	SF	W	A	QF	A	SF	W	1R	A	A	1R	A	A	A	2 / 7	8–2
Career statistics
Titles	0	0	5	1	2	1	0	0	1	1	0	0	0	0	0	0	11	
Finals	0	1	9	2	2	2	0	0	1	1	0	0	0	0	0	0	18	
Year-end ranking	96	50	4	13	5	11	96	N/A	22	N/A	245	N/A	N/A	N/A	191	N/A		

== Grand Slam finals ==
=== Singles: 31 (22 titles, 9 runner-ups) ===
Result	Year	Championship	Surface	Opponent	Score
Win	1987	French Open	Clay	(United States) Martina Navratilova	6–4, 4–6, 8–6
Loss	1987	Wimbledon	Grass	(United States) Martina Navratilova	5–7, 3–6
Loss	1987	US Open	Hard	(United States) Martina Navratilova	6–7^{(4–7)}, 1–6
Win	1988	Australian Open	Hard	(United States) Chris Evert	6–1, 7–6^{(7–3)}
Win	1988	French Open (2)	Clay	(Soviet Union) Natasha Zvereva	6–0, 6–0
Win	1988	Wimbledon	Grass	(United States) Martina Navratilova	5–7, 6–2, 6–1
Win	1988	US Open	Hard	(Argentina) Gabriela Sabatini	6–3, 3–6, 6–1
Win	1989	Australian Open (2)	Hard	(Czechoslovakia) Helena Suková	6–4, 6–4
Loss	1989	French Open	Clay	(Spain) Arantxa Sánchez Vicario	6–7^{(6–8)}, 6–3, 5–7
Win	1989	Wimbledon (2)	Grass	(United States) Martina Navratilova	6–2, 6–7^{(1–7)}, 6–1
Win	1989	US Open (2)	Hard	(United States) Martina Navratilova	3–6, 7–5, 6–1
Win	1990	Australian Open (3)	Hard	(United States) Mary Joe Fernández	6–3, 6–4
Loss	1990	French Open	Clay	(Socialist Federal Republic of Yugoslavia) Monica Seles	6–7^{(6–8)}, 4–6
Loss	1990	US Open	Hard	(Argentina) Gabriela Sabatini	2–6, 6–7^{(4–7)}
Win	1991	Wimbledon (3)	Grass	(Argentina) Gabriela Sabatini	6–4, 3–6, 8–6
Loss	1992	French Open	Clay	(Federal Republic of Yugoslavia) Monica Seles	2–6, 6–3, 8–10
Win	1992	Wimbledon (4)	Grass	(Federal Republic of Yugoslavia) Monica Seles	6–2, 6–1
Loss	1993	Australian Open	Hard	(Federal Republic of Yugoslavia) Monica Seles	6–4, 3–6, 2–6
Win	1993	French Open (3)	Clay	(United States) Mary Joe Fernández	4–6, 6–2, 6–4
Win	1993	Wimbledon (5)	Grass	(Czech Republic) Jana Novotná	7–6^{(8–6)}, 1–6, 6–4
Win	1993	US Open (3)	Hard	(Czech Republic) Helena Suková	6–3, 6–3
Win	1994	Australian Open (4)	Hard	(Spain) Arantxa Sánchez Vicario	6–0, 6–2
Loss	1994	US Open	Hard	(Spain) Arantxa Sánchez Vicario	6–1, 6–7^{(3–7)}, 4–6
Win	1995	French Open (4)	Clay	(Spain) Arantxa Sánchez Vicario	7–5, 4–6, 6–0
Win	1995	Wimbledon (6)	Grass	(Spain) Arantxa Sánchez Vicario	4–6, 6–1, 7–5
Win	1995	US Open (4)	Hard	(United States) Monica Seles	7–6^{(8–6)}, 0–6, 6–3
Win	1996	French Open (5)	Clay	(Spain) Arantxa Sánchez Vicario	6–3, 6–7^{(4–7)}, 10–8
Win	1996	Wimbledon (7)	Grass	(Spain) Arantxa Sánchez Vicario	6–3, 7–5
Win	1996	US Open (5)	Hard	(United States) Monica Seles	7–5, 6–4
Win	1999	French Open (6)	Clay	(Switzerland) Martina Hingis	4–6, 7–5, 6–2
Loss	1999	Wimbledon	Grass	(United States) Lindsay Davenport	4–6, 5–7

=== Doubles: 4 (1 title, 3 runner-ups) ===
Result	Year	Championship	Surface	Partner	Opponents	Score
Loss	1986	French Open	Clay	(Argentina) Gabriela Sabatini	(United States) Martina Navratilova (Hungary) Andrea Temesvári	1–6, 2–6
Loss	1987	French Open	Clay	(Argentina) Gabriela Sabatini	(United States) Martina Navratilova (United States) Pam Shriver	2–6, 1–6
Win	1988	Wimbledon	Grass	(Argentina) Gabriela Sabatini	(Soviet Union) Larisa Savchenko (Soviet Union) Natasha Zvereva	6–3, 1–6, 12–10
Loss	1989	French Open	Clay	(Argentina) Gabriela Sabatini	(Soviet Union) Larisa Savchenko (Soviet Union) Natasha Zvereva	4–6, 4–6

== Year-end championship finals ==
=== Singles: 6 (5 titles, 1 runner-up) ===
Result	Year	Championship	Surface	Opponent	Score
Loss	1986	Year-end championships	Carpet (i)	(United States) Martina Navratilova	6–7^{(8–10)}, 3–6, 2–6
Win	1987	Year-end championships	Carpet (i)	(Argentina) Gabriela Sabatini	4–6, 6–4, 6–0, 6–4
Win	1989	Year-end championships (2)	Carpet (i)	(United States) Martina Navratilova	6–4, 7–5, 2–6, 6–2
Win	1993	Year-end championships (3)	Carpet (i)	(Spain) Arantxa Sánchez Vicario	6–1, 6–4, 3–6, 6–1
Win	1995	Year-end championships (4)	Carpet (i)	(Germany) Anke Huber	6–1, 2–6, 6–1, 4–6, 6–3
Win	1996	Year-end championships (5)	Carpet (i)	(Switzerland) Martina Hingis	6–3, 4–6, 6–0, 4–6, 6–0

== Olympic finals ==
=== Singles: 2 (1 gold, 1 silver medal) ===
Result	Year	Event	Surface	Opponent	Score
Gold	1988	Seoul Olympics	Hard	(Argentina) Gabriela Sabatini	6–3, 6–3
Silver	1992	Barcelona Olympics	Clay	(United States) Jennifer Capriati	6–3, 3–6, 4–6

Graf also won the 1984 demonstration event at the 1984 Los Angeles Games, but this was for players aged 21 or under, and it was not an official Olympic event.

Result	Year	Event	Surface	Opponent	Score
1st place	1984	Los Angeles Olympics	Hard	(Socialist Federal Republic of Yugoslavia) Sabrina Goleš	1–6, 6–3, 6–4

=== Doubles ===
Result	Year	Event	Surface	Partner	Opponents	Score
Bronze	1988	Seoul Olympics	Hard	(West Germany) Claudia Kohde-Kilsch	Tied	DNP

Graf and Kohde-Kilsch lost in the semifinals to Jana Novotná and Helena Suková 7–5, 6–3. In 1988, there was no bronze medal match, and both beaten semifinalists received bronze medals.

== Category 5 / Tier I finals ==
=== Singles: 36 (26 titles, 10 runner-ups) ===
Result	Year	Tournament	Surface	Opponent	Score
Loss	1986	Virginia Slims of Florida	Hard	(United States) Chris Evert-Lloyd	3–6, 1–6
Loss	1986	Miami Open	Hard	(United States) Chris Evert-Lloyd	4–6, 2–6
Win	1986	Charleston Open	Clay (green)	(United States) Chris Evert-Lloyd	6–4, 7–5
Win	1986	German Open	Clay	(United States) Martina Navratilova	6–2, 6–3
Win	1987	Virginia Slims of Florida	Hard	(Czechoslovakia) Helena Suková	6–2, 6–3
Win	1987	Miami Open	Hard	(United States) Chris Evert	6–1, 6–2
Win	1987	Charleston Open (2)	Clay (green)	(Bulgaria) Manuela Maleeva	6–2, 4–6, 6–3
Win	1987	Italian Open	Clay	(Argentina) Gabriela Sabatini	7–5, 4–6, 6–0
Win	1987	German Open (2)	Clay	(Germany) Claudia Kohde-Kilsch	6–2, 6–3
Loss	1988	Virginia Slims of Florida	Hard	(Argentina) Gabriela Sabatini	6–2, 3–6, 1–6
Win	1988	Miami Open (2)	Hard	(United States) Chris Evert	6–4, 6–4
Win	1988	German Open (3)	Clay	(Czechoslovakia) Helena Suková	6–3, 6–2
Win	1989	Virginia Slims of Florida (2)	Hard	(United States) Chris Evert	4–6, 6–2, 6–3
Win	1989	Charleston Open (3)	Clay (green)	(Soviet Union) Natasha Zvereva	6–1, 6–1
Win	1989	German Open (4)	Clay	(Argentina) Gabriela Sabatini	6–3, 6–1
Loss	1990	German Open	Clay	(Socialist Federal Republic of Yugoslavia) Monica Seles	4–6, 3–6
Win	1990	Canadian Open	Hard	(Bulgaria) Katerina Maleeva	6–1, 6–7^{(6–8)}, 6–3
Loss	1991	Virginia Slims of Florida	Hard	(Argentina) Gabriela Sabatini	4–6, 6–7^{(6–8)}
Win	1991	German Open (5)	Clay	(Spain) Arantxa Sánchez Vicario	6–3, 4–6, 7–6^{(8–6)}
Win	1992	Virginia Slims of Florida (3)	Hard	(Spain) Conchita Martínez	3–6, 6–2, 6–0
Win	1992	German Open (6)	Clay	(Spain) Arantxa Sánchez Vicario	4–6, 7–5, 6–2
Loss	1993	Miami Open	Hard	(Spain) Arantxa Sánchez Vicario	4–6, 6–3, 2–6
Win	1993	Charleston Open (4)	Clay (green)	(Spain) Arantxa Sánchez Vicario	7–6^{(10–8)}, 6–1
Win	1993	German Open (7)	Clay	(Argentina) Gabriela Sabatini	7–6^{(7–3)}, 2–6, 6–4
Win	1993	Canadian Open (2)	Hard	(United States) Jennifer Capriati	6–1, 0–6, 6–3
Loss	1993	Virginia Slims of Philadelphia	Carpet (i)	(Spain) Conchita Martínez	3–6, 3–6
Win	1994	Pan Pacific Open	Carpet (i)	(United States) Martina Navratilova	6–2, 6–4
Win	1994	Miami Open (3)	Hard	(Belarus) Natasha Zvereva	4–6, 6–1, 6–2
Win	1994	German Open (8)	Clay	(Netherlands) Brenda Schultz	7–6^{(7–3)}, 6–4
Loss	1994	Canadian Open	Hard	(Spain) Arantxa Sánchez Vicario	5–7, 6–1, 6–7^{(4–7)}
Win	1995	Miami Open (4)	Hard	(Japan) Kimiko Date	6–1, 6–4
Win	1995	Virginia Slims of Philadelphia	Carpet (i)	(United States) Lori McNeil	6–1, 4–6, 6–3
Win	1996	Miami Open (5)	Hard	(United States) Chanda Rubin	6–1, 6–3
Win	1996	German Open (9)	Clay	(Slovakia) Karina Habšudová	4–6, 6–2, 7–5
Loss	1997	Pan Pacific Open	Carpet (i)	(Switzerland) Martina Hingis	walkover
Loss	1999	Indian Wells Open	Hard	(United States) Serena Williams	3–6, 6–3, 5–7

=== Doubles: 4 (2 titles, 2 runner-ups) ===
Result	Year	Tournament	Surface	Partner	Opponents	Score
Loss	1985	German Open	Clay	(France) Catherine Tanvier	(Germany) Claudia Kohde-Kilsch; (Czechoslovakia) Helena Suková	4–6, 1–6
Win	1986	German Open	Clay	(Czechoslovakia) Helena Suková	(United States) Martina Navratilova; (Hungary) Andrea Temesvári	7–5, 6–2
Loss	1986	Charleston Open	Clay	(France) Catherine Tanvier	(United States) Chris Evert; (United States) Anne White	3–6, 3–6
Win	1988	Miami Open	Hard	(Argentina) Gabriela Sabatini	(United States) Gigi Fernández; (United States) Zina Garrison	7–6^{(8–6)}, 6–3

== Career finals ==
=== Singles (107 titles, 31 runner-ups) ===
Legend Grand Slams (22) WTA Tour Championships (5) Olympic Gold (1) Tier I (15) Tier II (27) Tier III (9) Tier IV (8) VS (17)	Titles by surface Hard (37) Clay (32) Grass (7) Carpet (31)

Result	No.	Date	Tournament	Surface	Opponent	Score
Win	1.	13 Apr 1986	Hilton Head Island, US	Clay	(United States) Chris Evert	6–4, 7–5
Win	2.	20 Apr 1986	Amelia Island, US	Clay	(West Germany) Claudia Kohde-Kilsch	6–4, 5–7, 7–6^{(7–3)}
Win	3.	4 May 1986	Indianapolis, US	Clay	(Argentina) Gabriela Sabatini	2–6, 7–6^{(7–5)}, 6–4
Win	4.	19 May 1986	Berlin, West Germany	Clay	(United States) Martina Navratilova	6–2, 6–3
Win	5.	24 Aug 1986	Mahwah, US	Hard	(United States) Molly Van Nostrand	7–5, 6–1
Win	6.	14 Sep 1986	Tokyo, Japan	Carpet	(Bulgaria) Manuela Maleeva	6–4, 6–2
Win	7.	12 Oct 1986	Zurich, Switzerland	Carpet	(Czechoslovakia) Helena Suková	4–6, 6–2, 6–4
Win	8.	26 Oct 1986	Brighton, UK	Carpet	(Sweden) Catarina Lindqvist	6–3, 6–3
Win	9.	22 Feb 1987	Boca Raton, US	Hard	(Czechoslovakia) Helena Suková	6–2, 6–3
Win	10.	7 Mar 1987	Key Biscayne, US	Hard	(United States) Chris Evert	6–1, 6–2
Win	11.	12 Apr 1987	Hilton Head Island, US	Clay	(Bulgaria) Manuela Maleeva	6–2, 4–6, 6–3
Win	12.	19 Apr 1987	Amelia Island, US	Clay	(Czechoslovakia) Hana Mandlíková	6–3, 6–4
Win	13.	10 May 1987	Rome, Italy	Clay	(Argentina) Gabriela Sabatini	7–5, 4–6, 6–0
Win	14.	17 May 1987	Berlin, West Germany	Clay	(West Germany) Claudia Kohde-Kilsch	6–2, 6–3
Win	15.	6 Jun 1987	French Open, Paris	Clay	(United States) Martina Navratilova	6–4, 4–6, 8–6
Win	16.	16 Aug 1987	Los Angeles, US	Hard	(United States) Chris Evert	6–3, 6–4
Win	17.	27 Sep 1987	Hamburg, West Germany	Clay	(West Germany) Isabel Cueto	6–2, 6–2
Win	18.	1 Nov 1987	Zürich, Switzerland	Carpet	(Czechoslovakia) Hana Mandlíková	6–2, 6–2
Win	19.	22 Nov 1987	Virginia Slims Championships, New York	Carpet	(Argentina) Gabriela Sabatini	4–6, 6–4, 6–0, 6–4
Win	20.	23 Jan 1988	Australian Open, Melbourne	Hard	(United States) Chris Evert	6–1, 7–6^{(7–3)}
Win	21.	5 Mar 1988	San Antonio, US	Hard	(Bulgaria) Katerina Maleeva	6–4, 6–1
Win	22.	26 Mar 1988	Key Biscayne, US	Hard	(United States) Chris Evert	6–4, 6–4
Win	23.	15 May 1988	Berlin, West Germany	Clay	(Czechoslovakia) Helena Suková	6–3, 6–2
Win	24.	4 Jun 1988	French Open, Paris	Clay	(Soviet Union) Natalia Zvereva	6–0, 6–0
Win	25.	2 Jul 1988	Wimbledon, London	Grass	(United States) Martina Navratilova	5–7, 6–2, 6–1
Win	26.	31 Jul 1988	Hamburg, West Germany	Clay	(Bulgaria) Katerina Maleeva	6–4, 6–2
Win	27.	28 Aug 1988	Mahwah, US	Hard	(France) Nathalie Tauziat	6–0, 6–1
Win	28.	10 Sep 1988	US Open, New York	Hard	(Argentina) Gabriela Sabatini	6–3, 3–6, 6–1
Win	29.	1 Oct 1988	Summer Olympic Games, Seoul	Hard	(Argentina) Gabriela Sabatini	6–3, 6–3
Win	30.	30 Oct 1988	Brighton, UK	Carpet	(Bulgaria) Manuela Maleeva	6–2, 6–0
Win	31.	28 Jan 1989	Australian Open, Melbourne	Hard	(Czechoslovakia) Helena Suková	6–4, 6–4
Win	32.	19 Feb 1989	Washington, D.C., US	Carpet	(United States) Zina Garrison	6–1, 7–5
Win	33.	5 Mar 1989	San Antonio, US	Hard	(United States) Ann Henricksson	6–1, 6–4
Win	34.	19 Mar 1989	Boca Raton, US	Hard	(United States) Chris Evert	4–6, 6–2, 6–3
Win	35.	9 Apr 1989	Hilton Head Island, US	Clay	(Soviet Union) Natasha Zvereva	6–1, 6–1
Win	36.	7 May 1989	Hamburg, West Germany	Clay	(Czechoslovakia) Jana Novotná	w/o
Win	37.	21 May 1989	Berlin, West Germany	Clay	(Argentina) Gabriela Sabatini	6–3, 6–1
Win	38.	9 Jul 1989	Wimbledon, London	Grass	(United States) Martina Navratilova	6–2, 6–7^{(1–7)}, 6–1
Win	39.	6 Aug 1989	San Diego, US	Hard	(United States) Zina Garrison	6–4, 7–5
Win	40.	20 Aug 1989	Mahwah, US	Hard	(Hungary) Andrea Temesvári	7–5, 6–2
Win	41.	9 Sep 1989	US Open, New York	Hard	(United States) Martina Navratilova	3–6, 7–5, 6–1
Win	42.	22 Oct 1989	Zurich, Switzerland	Carpet	(Czechoslovakia) Jana Novotná	6–1, 7–6^{(8–6)}
Win	43.	29 Oct 1989	Brighton, UK	Carpet	(Socialist Federal Republic of Yugoslavia) Monica Seles	7–5, 6–4
Win	44.	19 Nov 1989	Virginia Slims Championships, New York	Carpet	(United States) Martina Navratilova	6–4, 7–5, 2–6, 6–2
Win	45.	27 Jan 1990	Australian Open, Melbourne	Hard	(United States) Mary Joe Fernández	6–3, 6–4
Win	46.	4 Feb 1990	Tokyo, Japan	Carpet	(Spain) Arantxa Sánchez Vicario	6–1, 6–2
Win	47.	15 Apr 1990	Amelia Island, US	Clay	(Spain) Arantxa Sánchez Vicario	6–1, 6–0
Win	48.	6 May 1990	Hamburg, West Germany	Clay	(Spain) Arantxa Sánchez Vicario	5–7, 6–0, 6–1
Win	49.	5 Aug 1990	Montreal, Canada	Hard	(Bulgaria) Katerina Maleeva	6–1, 6–7^{(6–8)}, 6–3
Win	50.	12 Aug 1990	San Diego, US	Hard	(Switzerland) Manuela Maleeva-Fragniere	6–3, 6–2
Win	51.	30 Sep 1990	Leipzig, East Germany	Carpet	(Spain) Arantxa Sánchez Vicario	6–1, 6–1
Win	52.	14 Oct 1990	Zurich, Switzerland	Carpet	(Argentina) Gabriela Sabatini	6–3, 6–2
Win	53.	28 Oct 1990	Brighton, UK	Carpet	(Czechoslovakia) Helena Suková	7–5, 6–3
Win	54.	11 Nov 1990	Worcester, US	Carpet	(Argentina) Gabriela Sabatini	7–6^{(7–5)} 6–3
Win	55.	31 Mar 1991	San Antonio, US	Hard	(Socialist Federal Republic of Yugoslavia) Monica Seles	6–4, 6–3
Win	56.	6 May 1991	Hamburg, Germany	Clay	(Socialist Federal Republic of Yugoslavia) Monica Seles	7–5, 6–7^{(4–7)}, 6–3
Win	57.	19 May 1991	Berlin, Germany	Clay	(Spain) Arantxa Sánchez Vicario	6–3, 4–6, 7–6^{(8–6)}
Win	58.	6 Jul 1991	Wimbledon, London	Grass	(Argentina) Gabriela Sabatini	6–4, 3–6, 8–6
Win	59.	6 Oct 1991	Leipzig, Germany	Carpet	(Czechoslovakia) Jana Novotná	6–3, 6–3
Win	60.	13 Oct 1991	Zurich, Switzerland	Carpet	(France) Nathalie Tauziat	6–4, 6–4
Win	61.	27 Oct 1991	Brighton, UK	Carpet	(United States) Zina Garrison	5–7, 6–4, 6–1
Win	62.	8 Mar 1992	Boca Raton, US	Hard	(Spain) Conchita Martínez	3–6, 6–2, 6–0
Win	63.	3 May 1992	Hamburg, Germany	Clay	(Spain) Arantxa Sánchez Vicario	7–6^{(7–5)}, 6–2
Win	64.	17 May 1992	Berlin, Germany	Clay	(Spain) Arantxa Sánchez Vicario	4–6, 7–5, 6–2
Win	65.	4 Jul 1992	Wimbledon, London	Grass	(Federal Republic of Yugoslavia) Monica Seles	6–2, 6–1
Win	66.	4 Oct 1992	Leipzig, Germany	Carpet	(Czechoslovakia) Jana Novotná	6–3, 1–6, 6–4
Win	67.	11 Oct 1992	Zürich, Switzerland	Carpet	(United States) Martina Navratilova	2–6, 7–5, 7–5
Win	68.	25 Oct 1992	Brighton, UK	Carpet	(Czechoslovakia) Jana Novotná	4–6, 6–4, 7–6^{(7–3)}
Win	69.	15 Nov 1992	Philadelphia, US	Carpet	(Spain) Arantxa Sánchez Vicario	6–3, 3–6, 6–1
Win	70.	7 Mar 1993	Delray Beach, US	Hard	(Spain) Arantxa Sánchez Vicario	6–4, 6–3
Win	71.	4 Apr 1993	Hilton Head Island, US	Clay	(Spain) Arantxa Sánchez Vicario	7–6^{(10–8)}, 6–1
Win	72.	16 May 1993	Berlin, Germany	Clay	(Argentina) Gabriela Sabatini	7–6^{(7–3)}, 2–6, 6–4
Win	73.	5 Jun 1993	French Open, Paris	Clay	(United States) Mary Joe Fernández	4–6, 6–2, 6–4
Win	74.	3 Jul 1993	Wimbledon, London	Grass	(Czech Republic) Jana Novotná	7–6^{(8–6)}, 1–6, 6–4
Win	75.	8 Aug 1993	San Diego, US	Hard	(Spain) Arantxa Sánchez Vicario	6–4, 4–6, 6–1
Win	76.	22 Aug 1993	Toronto, Canada	Hard	(United States) Jennifer Capriati	6–1, 0–6, 6–3
Win	77.	11 Sep 1993	US Open, New York	Hard	(Czech Republic) Helena Suková	6–3, 6–3
Win	78.	3 Oct 1993	Leipzig, Germany	Carpet	(Czech Republic) Jana Novotná	6–2, 6–0
Win	79.	21 Nov 1993	Virginia Slims Championships, New York	Carpet	(Spain) Arantxa Sánchez Vicario	6–1, 6–4, 3–6, 6–1
Win	80.	29 Jan 1994	Australian Open, Melbourne	Hard	(Spain) Arantxa Sánchez Vicario	6–0, 6–2
Win	81.	6 Feb 1994	Tokyo, Japan	Carpet	(United States) Martina Navratilova	6–2, 6–4
Win	82.	27 Feb 1994	Indian Wells, US	Hard	(South Africa) Amanda Coetzer	6–0, 6–4
Win	83.	6 Mar 1994	Delray Beach, US	Hard	(Spain) Arantxa Sánchez Vicario	6–3, 7–5
Win	84.	19 Mar 1994	Key Biscayne, US	Hard	(Belarus) Natasha Zvereva	4–6, 6–1, 6–2
Win	85.	15 May 1994	Berlin, Germany	Clay	(Netherlands) Brenda Schultz	7–6^{(7–3)}, 6–4
Win	86.	7 Aug 1994	San Diego, US	Hard	(Spain) Arantxa Sánchez Vicario	6–2, 6–1
Win	87.	19 Feb 1995	Paris, France	Carpet	(France) Mary Pierce	6–2, 6–2
Win	88.	12 Mar 1995	Delray Beach, US	Hard	(Spain) Conchita Martínez	6–2, 6–4
Win	89.	25 Mar 1995	Key Biscayne, US	Hard	(Japan) Kimiko Date	6–1, 6–4
Win	90.	16 Apr 1995	Houston, US	Clay	(Sweden) Åsa Carlsson	6–1, 6–1
Win	91.	10 Jun 1995	French Open, Paris	Clay	(Spain) Arantxa Sánchez Vicario	7–5, 4–6, 6–0
Win	92.	8 Jul 1995	Wimbledon, London	Grass	(Spain) Arantxa Sánchez Vicario	4–6, 6–1, 7–5
Win	93.	9 Sep 1995	US Open, New York	Hard	(United States) Monica Seles	7–6^{(8–6)}, 0–6, 6–3
Win	94.	12 Nov 1995	Philadelphia, US	Carpet	(United States) Lori McNeil	6–1, 4–6, 6–3
Win	95.	19 Nov 1995	WTA Tour Championships, New York	Carpet	(Germany) Anke Huber	6–1, 2–6, 6–1, 4–6, 6–3
Win	96.	16 Mar 1996	Indian Wells, US	Hard	(Spain) Conchita Martínez	7–6^{(7–5)}, 7–6^{(7–5)}
Win	97.	30 Mar 1996	Key Biscayne, US	Hard	(United States) Chanda Rubin	6–1, 6–3
Win	98.	19 May 1996	Berlin, Germany	Clay	(Slovakia) Karina Habšudová	4–6, 6–2, 7–5
Win	99.	8 Jun 1996	French Open, Paris	Clay	(Spain) Arantxa Sánchez Vicario	6–3, 6–7^{(4–7)}, 10–8
Win	100.	6 Jul 1996	Wimbledon, London	Grass	(Spain) Arantxa Sánchez Vicario	6–3, 7–5
Win	101.	8 Sep 1996	US Open, New York	Hard	(United States) Monica Seles	7–5, 6–4
Win	102.	24 Nov 1996	Chase Championships, New York	Carpet	(Switzerland) Martina Hingis	6–3, 4–6, 6–0, 4–6, 6–0
Win	103.	24 May 1997	Strasbourg, France	Clay	(Croatia) Mirjana Lučić	6–2, 7–5
Win	104.	29 Aug 1998	New Haven, US	Hard	(Czech Republic) Jana Novotná	6–4, 6–1
Win	105.	8 Nov 1998	Leipzig, Germany	Carpet	(France) Nathalie Tauziat	6–3, 6–4
Win	106.	15 Nov 1998	Philadelphia, US	Carpet	(United States) Lindsay Davenport	4–6, 6–3, 6–4
Win	107.	5 Jun 1999	French Open, Paris	Clay	(Switzerland) Martina Hingis	4–6, 7–5, 6–2

Legend
Grand Slams (9)
WTA Tour Championships (1)
Olympic silver (1)
Tier I (6)
Tier II (8)
Tier III (0)
Tier IV (0)
VS (6)

Result	No.	Date	Tournament	Surface	Opponent	Score
Loss	1.	14 Oct 1984	Filderstadt, West Germany	Carpet	(Sweden) Catarina Lindqvist	6–1, 6–4
Loss	2.	19 May 1985	Berlin, West Germany	Clay	(United States) Chris Evert	6–4, 7–5
Loss	3.	18 Aug 1985	Mahwah, US	Hard	(United States) Kathy Rinaldi	6–4, 3–6, 6–4
Loss	4.	6 Oct 1985	Fort Lauderdale, US	Hard	(United States) Martina Navratilova	6–3, 6–1
Loss	5.	2 Feb 1986	Key Biscayne, US	Hard	(United States) Chris Evert	6–3, 6–1
Loss	6.	23 Feb 1986	Boca West, US	Hard	(United States) Chris Evert	6–4, 6–2
Loss	7.	23 Nov 1986	Virginia Slims Championships, New York	Carpet	(United States) Martina Navratilova	7–6^{(7–3)}, 6–2
Loss	8.	4 Jul 1987	Wimbledon, London	Grass	(United States) Martina Navratilova	7–5, 6–3
Loss	9.	12 Sep 1987	US Open, New York	Hard	(United States) Martina Navratilova	7–6^{(7–4)}, 6–1
Loss	10.	13 Mar 1988	Boca Raton, US	Hard	(Argentina) Gabriela Sabatini	2–6, 6–3, 6–1
Loss	11.	16 Apr 1989	Amelia Island, US	Clay	(Argentina) Gabriela Sabatini	3–6, 6–3, 7–5
Loss	12.	10 Jun 1989	French Open, Paris	Clay	(Spain) Arantxa Sánchez Vicario	7–6^{(8–6)}, 3–6, 7–5
Loss	13.	20 May 1990	Berlin, West Germany	Clay	(Socialist Federal Republic of Yugoslavia) Monica Seles	6–4, 6–3
Loss	14.	9 Jun 1990	French Open, Paris	Clay	(Socialist Federal Republic of Yugoslavia) Monica Seles	7–6^{(8–6)}, 6–4
Loss	15.	8 Sep 1990	US Open, New York	Hard	(Argentina) Gabriela Sabatini	6–2, 7–6^{(7–4)}
Loss	16.	10 Mar 1991	Boca Raton, US	Hard	(Argentina) Gabriela Sabatini	6–4, 7–6^{(8–6)}
Loss	17.	14 Apr 1991	Amelia Island, US	Clay	(Argentina) Gabriela Sabatini	7–5, 7–6^{(7–3)}
Loss	18.	12 Apr 1992	Amelia Island, US	Clay	(Argentina) Gabriela Sabatini	6–2, 1–6, 6–3
Loss	19.	6 Jun 1992	French Open, Paris	Clay	(Federal Republic of Yugoslavia) Monica Seles	6–2, 3–6, 10–8
Loss	20.	7 Aug 1992	Summer Olympic Games, Barcelona	Clay	(United States) Jennifer Capriati	3–6, 6–3, 6–4
Loss	21.	30 Jan 1993	Australian Open, Melbourne	Hard	(Federal Republic of Yugoslavia) Monica Seles	4–6, 6–3, 6–2
Loss	22.	20 Mar 1993	Key Biscayne, US	Hard	(Spain) Arantxa Sánchez Vicario	6–4, 3–6, 6–3
Loss	23.	2 May 1993	Hamburg, Germany	Clay	(Spain) Arantxa Sánchez Vicario	6–3, 6–3
Loss	24.	14 Nov 1993	Philadelphia, US	Carpet	(Spain) Conchita Martínez	6–3, 6–3
Loss	25.	1 May 1994	Hamburg, Germany	Clay	(Spain) Arantxa Sánchez Vicario	4–6, 7–6^{(7–3)}, 7–6^{(8–6)}
Loss	26.	21 Aug 1994	Montreal, Canada	Hard	(Spain) Arantxa Sánchez Vicario	7–5, 1–6, 7–6^{(7–4)}
Loss	27.	10 Sep 1994	US Open, New York	Hard	(Spain) Arantxa Sánchez Vicario	1–6, 7–6^{(7–3)}, 6–4
Loss	28.	17 Nov 1996	Philadelphia, US	Carpet	(Czech Republic) Jana Novotná	6–4, ret.
Loss	29.	2 Feb 1997	Tokyo, Japan	Carpet	(Switzerland) Martina Hingis	walkover
Loss	30.	13 Mar 1999	Indian Wells, US	Hard	(United States) Serena Williams	6–3, 3–6, 7–5
Loss	31.	4 Jul 1999	Wimbledon, London	Grass	(United States) Lindsay Davenport	6–4, 7–5

=== Doubles (11 titles, 7 runner-ups) ===
Legend
Grand Slams (1–3)
WTA Tour Championships (0–0)
Tier I (1–0)
Tier II (2–0)
Tier III (0–0)
Tier IV (1–0)
VS (6–4)

Result	No.	Date	Tournament	Surface	Partner	Opponents	Score
Loss	1.	May 1985	Berlin, West Germany	Clay	(France) Catherine Tanvier	(West Germany) Claudia Kohde-Kilsch; (Czechoslovakia) Helena Suková	4–6, 1–6
Loss	2.	Apr 1986	Hilton Head Island, US	Clay	(France) Catherine Tanvier	(United States) Chris Evert; (United States) Anne White	3–6, 3–6
Win	1.	May 1986	Indianapolis, US	Clay	(Argentina) Gabriela Sabatini	(United States) Gigi Fernández; (United States) Robin White	6–2, 6–0
Win	2.	May 1986	Berlin, West Germany	Clay	(Czechoslovakia) Helena Suková	(United States) Martina Navratilova; (Hungary) Andrea Temesvári	7–5, 6–2
Loss	3.	Jun 1986	French Open, Paris	Clay	(Argentina) Gabriela Sabatini	(United States) Martina Navratilova; (Hungary) Andrea Temesvári	1–6, 2–6
Loss	4.	Aug 1986	Mahwah, US	Hard	(Czechoslovakia) Helena Suková	(United States) Betsy Nagelsen; (Australia) Elizabeth Smylie	6–7^{(4–7)}, 3–6
Win	3.	Sep 1986	Tokyo, Japan	Carpet	(West Germany) Bettina Bunge	(Bulgaria) Katerina Maleeva; (Bulgaria) Manuela Maleeva	6–1, 6–7^{(4–7)}, 6–2
Win	4.	Oct 1986	Zurich, Switzerland	Carpet	(Argentina) Gabriela Sabatini	(United States) Lori McNeil; (United States) Alycia Moulton	1–6, 6–4, 6–4
Win	5.	Oct 1986	Brighton, UK	Carpet	(Czechoslovakia) Helena Suková	(Denmark) Tine Scheuer-Larsen; (France) Catherine Tanvier	6–4, 6–4
Loss	5.	Nov 1986	Chicago, US	Carpet	(Argentina) Gabriela Sabatini	(West Germany) Claudia Kohde-Kilsch (Czechoslovakia) Helena Suková	7–6^{(7–5)}, 6–7^{(5–7)}, 3–6
Win	6.	Apr 1987	Amelia Island, US	Clay	(Argentina) Gabriela Sabatini	(Czechoslovakia) Hana Mandlíková (Australia) Wendy Turnbull	3–6, 6–3, 7–5
Loss	6.	Jun 1987	French Open, Paris	Clay	(Argentina) Gabriela Sabatini	(United States) Martina Navratilova (United States) Pam Shriver	2–6, 1–6
Win	7.	Mar 1988	Key Biscayne, US	Hard	(Argentina) Gabriela Sabatini	(United States) Gigi Fernández (United States) Zina Garrison	7–6^{(8–6)}, 6–3
Win	8.	Jul 1988	Wimbledon, London	Grass	(Argentina) Gabriela Sabatini	(Soviet Union) Larisa Savchenko; (Soviet Union) Natasha Zvereva	6–3, 1–6, 12–10
Loss	7.	Jun 1989	French Open, Paris	Clay	(Argentina) Gabriela Sabatini	(Soviet Union) Larisa Savchenko; (Soviet Union) Natasha Zvereva	4–6, 4–6
Win	9.	Aug 1989	Mahwah, US	Hard	(United States) Pam Shriver	(United States) Louise Allen (Peru) Laura Gildemeister	6–2, 6–4
Win	10.	May 1992	Hamburg, Germany	Clay	(Australia) Rennae Stubbs	(Netherlands) Manon Bollegraf; (Spain) Arantxa Sánchez Vicario	4–6, 6–3, 6–4
Win	11.	May 1993	Hamburg, Germany	Clay	(Australia) Rennae Stubbs	(Latvia) Larisa Neiland (Czech Republic) Jana Novotná	6–4, 7–6^{(7–5)}

== Fed Cup ==
=== Wins (2) ===
Edition	Team	Round	Opponents	Result
1987 Federation Cup	Steffi Graf; Claudia Kohde-Kilsch; Bettina Bunge; Silke Meier	1R	Hong Kong	Win (3–0)
1987 Federation Cup	Steffi Graf; Claudia Kohde-Kilsch; Bettina Bunge; Silke Meier	2R	South Korea	Win (3–0)
1987 Federation Cup	Steffi Graf; Claudia Kohde-Kilsch; Bettina Bunge; Silke Meier	QF	Argentina	Win (2–1)
1987 Federation Cup	Steffi Graf; Claudia Kohde-Kilsch; Bettina Bunge; Silke Meier	SF	Czechoslovakia	Win (2–1)
1987 Federation Cup	Steffi Graf; Claudia Kohde-Kilsch; Bettina Bunge; Silke Meier	F	United States	Win (2–1)
1992 Federation Cup	Steffi Graf; Anke Huber; Barbara Rittner; Sabine Hack	1R	New Zealand	Win (3–0)
1992 Federation Cup	Steffi Graf; Anke Huber; Barbara Rittner; Sabine Hack	2R	Netherlands	Win (2–1)
1992 Federation Cup	Steffi Graf; Anke Huber; Barbara Rittner; Sabine Hack	QF	Poland	Win (3–0)
1992 Federation Cup	Steffi Graf; Anke Huber; Barbara Rittner; Sabine Hack	SF	(United States) USA	Win (2–1)
1992 Federation Cup	Steffi Graf; Anke Huber; Barbara Rittner; Sabine Hack	F	Spain	Win (2–1)

=== Participations (32) ===
==== Singles (22) ====
Edition	Round	Date	Venue	Surface	Against	Opponent	W/L	Result	Team Result
1986 Federation Cup	1R	July 1986	Prague	Clay	Belgium	Ann Devries	Win	6–3, 6–1	Win (3–0)
1986 Federation Cup	2R	July 1986	Prague	Clay	Brazil	Patricia Medrado	Win	6–0, 6–2	Win (2–1)
1987 Federation Cup	1R	July 1987	Vancouver	Hard	Hong Kong	Patricia Hy	Win	6–7, 6–2, 6–4	Win (3–0)
1987 Federation Cup	2R	July 1987	Vancouver	Hard	South Korea	Kim Il-soon	Win	6–1, 6–1	Win (3–0)
1987 Federation Cup	QF	July 1987	Vancouver	Hard	Argentina	Gabriela Sabatini	Win	6–4, 6–4	Win (2–1)
1987 Federation Cup	SF	1 August 1987	Vancouver	Hard	Czechoslovakia	Hana Mandlíková	Win	6–4, 6–1	Win (2–1)
1987 Federation Cup	F	2 August 1987	Vancouver	Hard	United States	Chris Evert	Win	6–2, 6–1	Win (2–1)
1989 Federation Cup	1R	October 1989	Tokyo	Hard	Finland	Anne Aallonen	Win	6–0, 6–1	Win (3–0)
1989 Federation Cup	2R	October 1989	Tokyo	Hard	Japan	Akiko Kijimuta	Win	6–4, 6–1	Win (3–0)
1989 Federation Cup	QF	October 1989	Tokyo	Hard	Czechoslovakia	Helena Suková	Win	6–2, 6–1	Loss (1–2)
1991 Federation Cup	1R	23 July 1991	Nottingham	Hard	Greece	Angelikí Kanellopoúlou	Win	6–1, 6–2	Win (3–0)
1991 Federation Cup	2R	24 July 1991	Nottingham	Hard	Canada	Patricia Hy	Win	6–3, 3–6, 6–2	Win (2–1)
1992 Federation Cup	1R	13 July 1992	Frankfurt	Clay	New Zealand	Claudine Toleafoa	Win	6–2, 6–1	Win (3–0)
1992 Federation Cup	2R	15 July 1992	Frankfurt	Clay	Netherlands	Brenda Schultz	Win	6–3, 7–6^{(8–6)}	Win (2–1)
1992 Federation Cup	QF	16 July 1992	Frankfurt	Clay	Poland	Katarzyna Nowak	Win	6–0, 6–0	Win (3–0)
1992 Federation Cup	SF	18 July 1992	Frankfurt	Clay	United States	Lori McNeil	Win	6–0, 6–3	Win (2–1)
1992 Federation Cup	F	19 July 1992	Frankfurt	Clay	Spain	Arantxa Sánchez Vicario	Win	6–4, 6–2	Win (2–1)
1993 Federation Cup	1R	20 July 1993	Frankfurt	Clay	Australia	Nicole Provis	Lose	4–6, 6–1, 1–6	Loss (1–2)
1996 Federation Cup	QF	April 1996	Tokyo	Hard (i)	Japan	Naoko Sawamatsu	Win	6–1, 6–3	Loss (2–3)
1996 Federation Cup	QF	April 1996	Tokyo	Hard (i)	Japan	Kimiko Date	Lose	6–7^{(7–9)}, 6–3, 10–12	Loss (2–3)
1996 Federation Cup	WG PO	July 1996	Pörtschach	Clay	Austria	Judith Wiesner	Win	6–1, 3–6, 6–2	Win (4–1)
1996 Federation Cup	WG PO	July 1996	Pörtschach	Clay	Austria	Barbara Schett	Win	6–3, 6–2	Win (4–1)

==== Doubles (10) ====
Edition	Round	Date	Venue	Partnering	Against	Surface	Opponents	W/L	Result	Team Result
1986 Federation Cup	1R	July 1986	Prague	(West Germany) Claudia Kohde-Kilsch	Belgium	Clay	(Belgium) Ann Devries; (Belgium) Sandra Wasserman	Win	6–1, 7–5	Win (3–0)
1986 Federation Cup	2R	July 1986	Prague	(West Germany) Bettina Bunge	Brazil	Clay	(Brazil) Niege Dias; (Brazil) Patricia Medrado	Win	6–2, 6–1	Win (2–1)
1987 Federation Cup	2R	July 1987	Vancouver	(West Germany) Claudia Kohde-Kilsch	South Korea	Hard	(South Korea) Kim Il-soon; (South Korea) Lee Jeong-myung	Win	6–1, 6–0	Win (3–0)
1987 Federation Cup	SF	1 August 1987	Vancouver	(West Germany) Claudia Kohde-Kilsch	Czechoslovakia	Hard	(Czechoslovakia) Hana Mandlíková; (Czechoslovakia) Helena Suková	Win	7–5, 6–2	Win (2–1)
1987 Federation Cup	F	2 August 1987	Vancouver	(West Germany) Claudia Kohde-Kilsch	United States	Hard	(United States) Chris Evert; (United States) Pam Shriver	Win	1–6, 7–5, 6–4	Win (2–1)
1989 Federation Cup	2R	October 1989	Tokyo	(West Germany) Claudia Kohde-Kilsch	Japan	Hard	(Japan) Kimiko Date; (Japan) Etsuko Inoue	Win	6–4, 5–7, 6–2	Win (3–0)
1989 Federation Cup	QF	October 1989	Tokyo	(West Germany) Claudia Kohde-Kilsch	Czechoslovakia	Hard	(Czechoslovakia) Jana Novotná; (Czechoslovakia) Helena Suková	Lose	2–6, 2–6	Loss (1–2)
1991 Federation Cup	1R	23 July 1991	Nottingham	(Germany) Barbara Rittner	Greece	Hard	(Greece) Angelikí Kanellopoúlou (Greece) Christína Papadáki	Win	6–3, 6–0	Win (3–0)
1992 Federation Cup	QF	16 July 1992	Frankfurt	(Germany) Anke Huber	Poland	Clay	(Poland) Magdalena Feistel; (Poland) Katarzyna Teodorowicz-Lisowska	Win	6–4, 7–5	Win (3–0)
1996 Federation Cup	QF	April 1996	Tokyo	(Germany) Anke Huber	Japan	Hard (i)	(Japan) Kyōko Nagatsuka; (Japan) Ai Sugiyama	Lose	6–4, 3–6, 3–6	Loss (2–3)

== Career Grand Slam tournament seedings ==
The tournaments won by Graf are in boldface, and advanced into finals by Graf are in italics.

Legend seeded No. 1 (**18** / 29) seeded No. 2 (**3** / 10) seeded No. 3 (0 / 2) seeded No. 4–10 (**1** / 4) seeded No. 11–32 (0 / 4) unseeded (0 / 5)	Longest streak 14 4 1 4 3 6

Year	Australian Open	French Open	Wimbledon	US Open
1983	not seeded	not seeded	did not qualify	did not qualify
1984	16th	not seeded	not seeded	not seeded
1985	did not play	11th	11th	11th
1986	Not Held	3rd	did not play	3rd
1987	did not play	**2nd (1)**	2nd (1)	1st (2)
1988	**1st (2)**	**1st (3)**	**1st (4)**	**1st (5)**
1989	**1st (6)**	1st (3)	**1st (7)**	**1st (8)**
1990	**1st (9)**	1st (4)	1st	1st (5)
1991	1st	2nd	**1st (10)**	1st
1992	did not play	2nd (6)	**2nd (11)**	2nd
1993	2nd (7)	**1st (12)**	**1st (13)**	**1st (14)**
1994	**1st (15)**	1st	1st	1st (8)
1995	did not play	**2nd (16)**	**1st (17)**	**1st (18)**
1996	did not play	**1st (19)**	**1st (20)**	**1st (21)**
1997	1st	2nd	did not play	did not play
1998	did not play	did not play	4th	8th
1999	10th	**6th (22)**	2nd (9)	did not play

== WTA Tour career earnings ==
Year	Grand Slam singles titles	WTA singles titles	Total singles titles	Earnings ($)	Money list rank
1986	0	8	8	612,118	4
1987	1	10	11	1,063,785	1
1988	4	7	11	1,378,128	1
1989	3	11	14	1,562,905	1
1990	1	9	10	1,921,853	1
1991	1	6	7	1,461,949	2
1992	1	7	8	1,691,139	2
1993	3	7	10	2,821,337	1
1994	1	6	7	1,487,980	3
1995	3	6	9	2,538,620	1
1996	3	4	7	2,665,706	1
1997	0	1	1	230,249	34
1998	0	3	3	569,845	12
1999	1	0	1	1,248,867	5
Career	22	85	107	21,895,277	20

== Head-to-head vs. top 10 ranked players ==
Player	Record	Win %	Hard	Clay	Grass	Carpet	Last match
Number 1 ranked players							
(Belgium) Kim Clijsters	1–0	100%	0–0	0–0	1–0	0–0	Won (6–2, 6–2) at 1999 Wimbledon
(France) Amélie Mauresmo	1–0	100%	0–0	1–0	0–0	0–0	Won (6–3, 6–3) at 1997 French Open
(United States) Jennifer Capriati	10–1	91%	4–0	2–1	2–0	2–0	Won (6–0, 6–1) at 1999 Miami
(Spain) Arantxa Sánchez Vicario	28–8	78%	8–4	13–4	3–0	4–0	Won (6–3, 7–5) at 1996 Wimbledon
(Switzerland) Martina Hingis	7–2	78%	1–0	1–1	2–0	3–1	Won (4–6, 7–5, 6–2) at 1999 French Open
(Socialist Federal Republic of Yugoslavia) / (Federal Republic of Yugoslavia) / (United States) Monica Seles	10–5	67%	3–2	3–3	2–0	2–0	Won (6–7^{(2–7)}, 6–3, 6–4) at 1999 French Open
(United States) Venus Williams	3–2	60%	2–1	0–0	1–0	0–1	Won (6–2, 3–6, 6–4) at 1999 Wimbledon
(United States) Lindsay Davenport	8–6	57%	5–4	1–0	0–1	2–1	Lost (4–6, 5–7) at 1999 Wimbledon
(United States) Chris Evert	8–6	57%	6–3	1–3	1–0	0–0	Won (6–2, 6–1) at 1989 Wimbledon
(Czechoslovakia) / (United States) Martina Navratilova	9–9	50%	2–5	2–0	2–1	3–3	Won (6–2, 6–4) at 1994 Tokyo
(United States) Tracy Austin	1–1	50%	1–0	0–1	0–0	0–0	Won (6–0, 6–0) at 1994 Indian Wells
(United States) Serena Williams	1–1	50%	1–1	0–0	0–0	0–0	Lost (3–6, 6–3, 5–7) at 1999 Indian Wells
Number 2 ranked players							
(Spain) Conchita Martínez	13–1	93%	5–0	4–0	1–0	3–1	Won (6–3, 6–1) at 1996 French Open
(Czechoslovakia) / (Czech Republic) Jana Novotná	29–4	88%	6–1	7–0	5–0	11–3	Won (6–2, 6–0) at 1999 Indian Wells
Number 3 ranked players							
(France) Nathalie Tauziat	21–0	100%	9–0	5–0	0–0	7–0	Won (6–1, 6–4) at 1998 Philadelphia
(Bulgaria) / (Switzerland) Manuela Maleeva	17–0	100%	5–0	4–0	0–0	8–0	Won (4–6, 6–1, 6–0) at 1993 US Open
(Czechoslovakia) / (Australia) Hana Mandlíková	8–1	89%	4–0	3–1	0–0	1–0	Won (6–0, 6–1) at 1989 Mahwah
(United States) Pam Shriver	9–3	75%	5–0	0–0	2–1	2–2	Won (6–1, 6–3) at 1993 Philadelphia
(South Africa) Amanda Coetzer	11–4	73%	5–2	2–2	1–0	3–0	Won (6–3, 6–0) at 1998 New Haven
(Argentina) Gabriela Sabatini	29–11	73%	11–5	10–4	3–0	5–2	Won (6–4, 7–6^{(7–5)}) at 1995 US Open
(France) Mary Pierce	4–2	67%	3–0	0–1	0–0	1–1	Won (6–2, 6–2) at 1995 Paris
(Australia) Wendy Turnbull	1–2	33%	1–0	0–0	0–2	0–0	Won (6–1, 6–7, 6–2) at 1986 Key Biscayne
Number 4 ranked players							
(United States) Mary Joe Fernández	17–0	100%	7–0	5–0	3–0	2–0	Won (4–6, 6–3, 6–4) at 1999 Australian Open
(West Germany) / (Germany) Anke Huber	10–0	100%	3–0	3–0	0–0	4–0	Won (6–1, 2–6, 6–1, 4–6, 6–3) at 1995 WTA Finals
(Bulgaria) Magdalena Maleeva	8–0	100%	1–0	6–0	0–0	1–0	Won (6–2, 6–0) at 1999 French Open
(Socialist Federal Republic of Yugoslavia) / (Croatia) Iva Majoli	7–0	100%	2–0	3–0	0–0	2–0	Won (6–2, 6–3) at 1997 Tokyo
(Australia) Dianne Fromholtz	1–0	100%	0–0	1–0	0–0	0–0	Won (6–3, 3–6, 7–6) at 1983 Hittfield
(Czechoslovakia) / (Czech Republic) Helena Suková	21–1	95%	10–0	4–0	0–1	7–0	Won (7–5, 6–4) at 1994 Delray Beach
(Japan) Kimiko Date-Krumm	7–1	87%	5–1	0–0	1–0	1–0	Won (6–2, 2–6, 6–3) at 1996 Wimbledon
(United States) Zina Garrison	12–2	86%	7–0	0–1	1–1	4–0	Won (6–1, 6–3) at 1995 Philadelphia
(West Germany) / (Germany) Claudia Kohde-Kilsch	12–2	86%	5–0	3–2	1–0	3–0	Won (6–0, 6–4) at 1990 Wimbledon
Number 5 ranked players							
(United States) Kathy Jordan	1–0	100%	1–0	0–0	0–0	0–0	Won (6–4, 6–4) at 1985 Mahwah
(Soviet Union) / (Belarus) Natasha Zvereva	20–1	95%	7–0	6–0	1–1	6–0	Won (6–2, 6–4) at 1999 Miami
(West Germany) / (Germany) Sylvia Hanika	4–1	80%	3–1	0–0	0–0	1–0	Won (6–2, 6–1) at 1988 Mahwah
(United Kingdom) Jo Durie	3–4	43%	2–1	1–0	0–1	0–2	Won (6–1, 6–1) at 1988 Miami
Number 6 ranked players							
(Bulgaria) Katerina Maleeva	11–0	100%	4–0	4–0	0–0	3–0	Won (6–3, 6–1) at 1993 Berlin
(United States) Chanda Rubin	7–0	100%	4–0	2–0	0–0	1–0	Won (2–6, 6–4, 6–2) at 1999 Indian Wells
(West Germany) / (Germany) Bettina Bunge	5–0	100%	2–0	2–0	1–0	0–0	Won (6–1, 6–2) at 1989 San Diego
Number 7 ranked players							
(Hungary) Andrea Temesvári	9–0	100%	4–0	3–0	1–0	1–0	Won (6–1, 6–2) at 1991 US Open
(Austria) Barbara Schett	2–0	100%	1–0	0–0	0–0	1–0	Won (6–3, 6–2) at 1999 Hanover
(Romania) Irina Spîrlea	2–0	100%	0–0	2–0	0–0	0–0	Won (6–7^{(4–7)}, 6–2, 6–2) at 1997 French Open
(France) Julie Halard-Decugis	9–1	90%	4–0	4–1	0–0	1–0	Lost (7–5, 4–6, 4–6) at 1999 Berlin
(United States) Kathy Rinaldi Stunkel	3–2	60%	2–2	1–0	0–0	0–0	Won (6–3, 6–4) at 1990 San Diego
(Switzerland) Patty Schnyder	0–1	0%	0–1	0–0	0–0	0–0	Lost (3–6, 4–6) at 1998 US Open
Number 8 ranked players							
(United States) Bonnie Gadusek	4–0	100%	3–0	1–0	0–0	0–0	Won (6–3, 6–1) at 1986 US Open
(France) Sandrine Testud	3–0	100%	2–0	1–0	0–0	0–0	Won (3–6, 6–2, 6–1) at 1997 Strasbourg
(Canada) Carling Bassett-Seguso	2–0	100%	0–0	1–0	0–0	1–0	Won (6–4, 6–4) at 1990 Amelia Island
(Japan) Ai Sugiyama	4–1	80%	3–1	0–0	0–0	1–0	Won (6–0, 6–1) at 1999 Indian Wells
(Russia) Anna Kournikova	2–1	67%	1–0	1–0	0–1	0–0	Won (6–3, 7–6^{(7–4)}) at 1999 French Open
Number 9 ranked players							
(Netherlands) Brenda Schultz-McCarthy	6–0	100%	0–0	4–0	0–0	2–0	Won (6–1, 7–5) at 1997 Tokyo
(United States) Lisa Bonder	3–0	100%	2–0	0–0	0–0	1–0	Won (6–1, 6–1) at 1988 Boca Raton
(Argentina) Paola Suárez	3–0	100%	1–0	2–0	0–0	0–0	Won (6–0, 6–3) at 1999 Australian Open
(Belgium) Dominique Monami	1–0	100%	0–0	0–0	0–0	1–0	Won (6–1, 3–6, 6–0) at 1998 Leipzig
(United States) Lori McNeil	9–2	82%	3–0	1–0	0–1	5–1	Won (6–1, 4–6, 6–3) at 1995 Philadelphia
Number 10 ranked players							
(United States) Stephanie Rehe	5–0	100%	3–0	0–0	1–0	1–0	Won (6–0, 6–3) at 1990 San Diego
(Czechoslovakia) / (Slovakia) Karina Habšudová	4–0	100%	1–0	1–0	0–0	2–0	Won (6–1, 6–4) at 1996 WTA Finals
(Austria) Barbara Paulus	2–0	100%	0–0	0–0	0–0	2–0	Won (7–5, 6–1) at 1991 Brighton
(United States) Kathleen Horvath	1–0	100%	0–0	1–0	0–0	0–0	Won (6–1, 6–3) at 1985 Berlin
(Sweden) Catarina Lindqvist	3–2	60%	1–0	0–0	0–0	2–2	Won (6–2, 7–5) at 1990 Brighton
Total	452–91	83%	181–35 (84%)	122–25 (83%)	36–11 (77%)	113–20 (85%)	

== Top 10 wins ==
Graf has a 208–63 record against players who were, at the time the match was played, ranked in the top 10.

Season	1984	1985	1986	1987	1988	1989	1990	1991	1992	1993	1994	1995	1996	1997	1998	1999	Total
Wins	2	0	15	28	18	22	18	11	17	23	11	15	13	1	8	6	208

#	Player	Rank	Event	Surface	Round	Score	Graf rank
1988
1.	(Czech Republic) Hana Mandlíková	5	Australian Open, Melbourne, Australia	Hard	QF	6–2, 6–2	1
2.	(Germany) Claudia Kohde-Kilsch	10	Australian Open, Melbourne, Australia	Hard	SF	6–2, 6–3	1
3.	(United States) Chris Evert	3	Australian Open, Melbourne, Australia	Hard	F	6–1, 7–6^{(7–3)}	1
4.	(United States) Lori McNeil	10	San Antonio, United States	Hard	SF	6–7^{(2–7)}, 6–1, 6–1	1
5.	(United States) Pam Shriver	4	Boca Raton, United States	Hard	SF	6–4, 4–6, 7–6^{(7–5)}	1
6.	(Germany) Claudia Kohde-Kilsch	9	Miami, United States	Hard	QF	6–3, 6–0	1
7.	(United States) Chris Evert	3	Miami, United States	Hard	F	6–4, 6–4	1
8.	(Germany) Claudia Kohde-Kilsch	8	Berlin, Germany	Clay	SF	6–1, 6–0	1
9.	(Czech Republic) Helena Suková	7	Berlin, Germany	Clay	F	6–3, 6–2	1
10.	(Argentina) Gabriela Sabatini	5	French Open, Paris, France	Clay	SF	6–3, 7–6^{(7–3)}	1
11.	(United States) Pam Shriver	4	Wimbledon, London, United Kingdom	Grass	SF	6–1, 6–2	1
12.	(United States) Martina Navratilova	2	Wimbledon, London, United Kingdom	Grass	F	5–7, 6–2, 6–1	1
13.	(Czech Republic) Helena Suková	7	Mahwah, United States	Hard	SF	6–1, 6–1	1
14.	(Argentina) Gabriela Sabatini	4	US Open, New York, United States	Hard	F	6–3, 3–6, 6–1	1
15.	(United States) Zina Garrison	9	Olympics, Seoul, South Korea	Hard	SF	6–2, 6–0	1
16.	(Argentina) Gabriela Sabatini	4	Olympics, Seoul, South Korea	Hard	F	6–3, 6–3	1
17.	(Bulgaria) Manuela Maleeva	6	Brighton, United Kingdom	Carpet (i)	SF	6–2, 6–0	1
18.	(Bulgaria) Manuela Maleeva	7	WTA Tour Championships, New York, United States	Carpet (i)	QF	6–1, 6–3	1
1989
19.	(Argentina) Gabriela Sabatini	4	Australian Open, Melbourne, Australia	Hard	SF	6–3, 6–0	1
20.	(Czech Republic) Helena Suková	6	Australian Open, Melbourne, Australia	Hard	F	6–4, 6–4	1
21.	(Soviet Union) Natasha Zvereva	8	Washington, D.C., United States	Hard	SF	6–3, 6–4	1
22.	(United States) Zina Garrison	9	Washington, D.C., United States	Hard	F	6–1, 7–5	1
23.	(Czech Republic) Helena Suková	5	Boca Raton, United States	Hard	SF	6–2, 6–1	1
24.	(United States) Chris Evert	4	Boca Raton, United States	Hard	F	4–6, 6–2, 6–3	1
25.	(Soviet Union) Natasha Zvereva	9	Hilton Head, United States	Clay	F	6–1, 6–1	1
26.	(Argentina) Gabriela Sabatini	3	Berlin, Germany	Clay	F	6–3, 6–1	1
27.	(Spain) Arantxa Sánchez Vicario	7	Wimbledon, London, United Kingdom	Grass	QF	7–5, 6–1	1
28.	(United States) Chris Evert	4	Wimbledon, London, United Kingdom	Grass	SF	6–2, 6–1	1
29.	(United States) Martina Navratilova	2	Wimbledon, London, United Kingdom	Grass	F	6–2, 6–7^{(1–7)}, 6–1	1
30.	(United States) Zina Garrison	6	San Diego, United States	Hard	F	6–4, 7–5	1
31.	(Czech Republic) Helena Suková	8	US Open, New York, United States	Hard	QF	6–1, 6–1	1
32.	(Argentina) Gabriela Sabatini	3	US Open, New York, United States	Hard	SF	3–6, 6–4, 6–2	1
33.	(United States) Martina Navratilova	2	US Open, New York, United States	Hard	F	3–6, 7–5, 6–1	1
34.	(Czech Republic) Helena Suková	8	Fed Cup, Tokyo, Japan	Hard	QF	6–2, 6–1	1
35.	(Czech Republic) Helena Suková	8	Zürich, Switzerland	Carpet (i)	SF	6–1, 6–3	1
36.	(Czech Republic) Jana Novotná	10	Brighton, United Kingdom	Hard (i)	SF	4–6, 6–3, 6–3	1
37.	(Socialist Federal Republic of Yugoslavia) Monica Seles	7	Brighton, United Kingdom	Hard (i)	F	7–5, 6–4	1
38.	(Czech Republic) Helena Suková	7	WTA Tour Championships, New York, United States	Carpet (i)	QF	6–2, 6–1	1
39.	(Argentina) Gabriela Sabatini	3	WTA Tour Championships, New York, United States	Carpet (i)	SF	6–3, 5–7, 6–1	1
40.	(United States) Martina Navratilova	2	WTA Tour Championships, New York	Carpet (i)	F	6–4, 7–5, 2–6, 6–2	1
1990
41.	(Czech Republic) Helena Suková	9	Australian Open, Melbourne	Hard	SF	6–3, 3–6, 6–4	1
42.	(Switzerland) Manuela Maleeva-Fragniere	8	Tokyo, Japan	Carpet (i)	SF	6–4, 6–4	1
43.	(Spain) Arantxa Sánchez Vicario	5	Tokyo, Japan	Carpet (i)	F	6–1, 6–2	1
44.	(Spain) Arantxa Sánchez Vicario	5	Amelia Island, United States	Clay	F	6–1, 6–0	1
45.	(Spain) Arantxa Sánchez Vicario	4	Hamburg, Germany	Clay	F	5–7, 6–0, 6–1	1
46.	(Spain) Conchita Martínez	10	French Open, Paris, France	Clay	QF	6–1, 6–3	1
47.	(Bulgaria) Katerina Maleeva	7	Montreal, Canada	Hard	F	6–1, 6–7^{(6–8)}, 6–3	1
48.	(United States) Zina Garrison	5	San Diego, United States	Hard	SF	6–4, 7–5	1
49.	(Switzerland) Manuela Maleeva-Fragniere	9	San Diego, United States	Hard	F	6–3, 6–2	1
50.	(Spain) Arantxa Sánchez Vicario	7	US Open, New York	Hard	SF	6–1, 6–2	1
51.	(Spain) Conchita Martínez	10	Leipzig, Germany	Carpet (i)	SF	7–6^{(7–3)}, 7–6^{(7–4)}	1
52.	(Spain) Arantxa Sánchez Vicario	6	Leipzig, Germany	Carpet (i)	F	6–1, 6–1	1
53.	(Switzerland) Manuela Maleeva-Fragniere	9	Zürich, Switzerland	Carpet (i)	SF	6–7^{(5–7)}, 6–2, 6–3	1
54.	(Argentina) Gabriela Sabatini	4	Zürich, Switzerland	Carpet (i)	F	6–3, 6–2	1
55.	(Switzerland) Manuela Maleeva-Fragniere	9	Worcester, United States	Carpet (i)	SF	7–6^{(7–3)}, 6–7^{(5–7)}, 6–3	1
56.	(Argentina) Gabriela Sabatini	4	Worcester, United States	Carpet (i)	F	7–6^{(7–5)}, 6–3	1
57.	(United States) Jennifer Capriati	10	WTA Tour Championships, New York, United States	Carpet (i)	1R	6–3, 5–7, 6–3	1
58.	(Bulgaria) Katerina Maleeva	6	WTA Tour Championships, New York, United States	Carpet (i)	QF	6–3, 6–0	1
1991
59.	(Switzerland) Manuela Maleeva	10	Miami, United States	Hard	QF	6–1, 6–3	2
60.	(Socialist Federal Republic of Yugoslavia) Monica Seles	1	San Antonio, United States	Hard	F	6–4, 6–3	2
61.	(Socialist Federal Republic of Yugoslavia) Monica Seles	1	Hamburg, Germany	Clay	F	7–5, 6–7^{(4–7)}, 6–3	2
62.	(Czech Republic) Jana Novotná	7	Berlin, Germany	Clay	SF	6–1, 6–0	2
63.	(Spain) Arantxa Sánchez Vicario	6	Berlin, Germany	Clay	F	6–3, 4–6, 7–6^{(8–6)}	2
64.	(United States) Zina Garrison	9	Wimbledon, United Kingdom	Grass	QF	6–1, 6–3	2
65.	(United States) Mary Joe Fernández	6	Wimbledon, United Kingdom	Grass	SF	6–2, 6–4	2
66.	(Argentina) Gabriela Sabatini	3	Wimbledon, United Kingdom	Grass	F	6–4, 3–6, 8–6	2
67.	(Spain) Conchita Martínez	8	US Open, New York	Hard	QF	6–1, 6–3	1
68.	(Czech Republic) Jana Novotná	9	Leipzig, Germany	Carpet (i)	F	6–3, 6–3	2
69.	(Spain) Conchita Martínez	9	WTA Tour Championships, New York, United States	Carpet (i)	1R	6–0, 6–3	2
1992
70.	(United States) Mary Joe Fernández	7	Boca Raton, United States	Hard	SF	6–0, 7–5	2
71.	(Spain) Conchita Martínez	8	Boca Raton, United States	Hard	F	3–6, 6–2, 6–0	2
72.	(United States) Mary Joe Fernández	7	Miami, United States	Hard	QF	7–6^{(7–5)}, 6–4	2
73.	(Spain) Arantxa Sánchez Vicario	5	Amelia Island, United States	Clay	SF	6–7^{(3–7)}, 6–4, 6–3	2
74.	(Spain) Arantxa Sánchez Vicario	5	Hamburg, Germany	Clay	F	7–6^{(7–5)}, 6–2	2
75.	(United States) Jennifer Capriati	6	Berlin, Germany	Clay	SF	2–6, 6–3, 6–4	2
76.	(Spain) Arantxa Sánchez Vicario	5	Berlin, Germany	Clay	F	4–6, 7–5, 6–2	2
77.	(Spain) Arantxa Sánchez Vicario	5	French Open, Paris	Clay	SF	0–6, 6–2, 6–2	2
78.	(Argentina) Gabriela Sabatini	3	Wimbledon, United Kingdom	Grass	SF	6–3, 6–3	2
79.	(Socialist Federal Republic of Yugoslavia) Monica Seles	1	Wimbledon, London, United Kingdom	Grass	F	6–1, 6–2	2
80.	(Spain) Arantxa Sánchez Vicario	5	Fed Cup, Frankfurt, Germany	Clay	F	6–4, 6–2	2
81.	(United States) Mary Joe Fernández	7	Olympics, Barcelona, Spain	Clay	SF	6–4, 6–2	2
82.	(United States) Martina Navratilova	5	Zürich, Switzerland	Carpet (i)	F	2–6, 7–5, 7–5	2
83.	(Czech Republic) Jana Novotná	10	Brighton, United Kingdom	Carpet (i)	F	4–6, 6–4, 7–6^{(7–3)}	2
84.	(Spain) Conchita Martínez	8	Philadelphia, United States	Carpet (i)	QF	6–1, 6–1	2
85.	(United States) Jennifer Capriati	7	Philadelphia, United Kingdom	Carpet (i)	SF	6–0, 6–1	2
86.	(Spain) Arantxa Sánchez Vicario	5	Philadelphia, United Kingdom	Carpet (i)	F	6–3, 3–6, 6–1	2
1993
87.	(United States) Jennifer Capriati	7	Australian Open, Melbourne, Australia	Hard	QF	7–5, 6–2	2
88.	(Spain) Arantxa Sánchez Vicario	5	Australian Open, Melbourne	Hard	SF	7–5, 6–4	2
89.	(Spain) Arantxa Sánchez Vicario	4	Delray Beach, United States	Hard	F	6–4, 6–3	2
90.	(Argentina) Gabriela Sabatini	5	Miami, United States	Hard	SF	6–0, 6–2	2
91.	(Argentina) Gabriela Sabatini	5	Hilton Head, United States	Clay (green)	SF	6–0, 7–6^{(7–3)}	2
92.	(Spain) Arantxa Sánchez Vicario	4	Hilton Head, United States	Clay (green)	F	7–6^{(8–6)}, 6–1	2
93.	(Czech Republic) Jana Novotná	9	Hamburg, Germany	Clay	SF	6–3, 3–6, 6–1	2
94.	(Bulgaria) Magdalena Maleeva	10	Berlin, Germany	Clay	QF	4–6, 6–4, 6–3	2
95.	(United States) Mary Joe Fernández	8	Berlin, Germany	Clay	SF	4–6, 6–4, 6–3	2
96.	(Argentina) Gabriela Sabatini	5	Berlin, Germany	Clay	F	7–6^{(7–3)}, 2–6, 6–4	2
97.	(United States) Jennifer Capriati	8	French Open, Paris	Clay	QF	6–3, 7–5	2
98.	(Germany) Anke Huber	10	French Open, Paris	Clay	SF	6–1, 6–1	2
99.	(United States) Mary Joe Fernández	7	French Open, Paris	Clay	F	4–6, 6–2, 6–4	2
100.	(United States) Jennifer Capriati	8	Wimbledon, United Kingdom	Grass	QF	7–6^{(7–3)}, 6–1	1
101.	(Spain) Conchita Martínez	7	Wimbledon, United Kingdom	Grass	SF	7–6^{(7–0)}, 6–3	1
102.	(Czech Republic) Jana Novotná	9	Wimbledon, United Kingdom	Grass	F	7–6^{(8–6)}, 1–6, 6–4	1
103.	(Spain) Conchita Martínez	7	San Diego, United States	Hard	SF	7–5, 6–2	1
104.	(Spain) Arantxa Sánchez Vicario	3	San Diego, United States	Hard	F	6–4, 4–6, 6–1	1
105.	(United States) Jennifer Capriati	9	Toronto, Canada	Hard	F	6–1, 0–6, 6–3	1
106.	(Argentina) Gabriela Sabatini	6	US Open, New York, United States	Hard	QF	6–2, 5–7, 6–1	1
107.	(Czech Republic) Jana Novotná	8	Leipzig, Germany	Carpet (i)	F	6–2, 6–0	1
108.	(Germany) Anke Huber	8	WTA Tour Championships, New York, United States	Carpet (i)	SF	6–2, 3–6, 6–3	1
109.	(Spain) Arantxa Sánchez Vicario	2	WTA Tour Championships, New York, United States	Carpet (i)	F	6–1, 6–4, 3–6, 6–1	1
1994
110.	(Japan) Kimiko Date	9	Australian Open, Melbourne	Hard	SF	6–3, 6–3	1
111.	(Spain) Arantxa Sánchez Vicario	2	Australian Open, Melbourne	Hard	F	6–0, 6–2	1
112.	(United States) Martina Navratilova	3	Tokyo, Japan	Hard	F	6–2, 6–4	1
113.	(Spain) Arantxa Sánchez Vicario	2	Delray Beach, United States	Hard	F	6–3, 7–5	1
114.	(Japan) Kimiko Date	7	Miami, United States	Hard	QF	6–1, 6–1	1
115.	(Czech Republic) Jana Novotná	5	Hamburg, Germany	Clay	SF	6–3, 6–3	1
116.	(Czech Republic) Jana Novotná	5	Berlin, Germany	Clay	SF	6–2, 6–3	1
117.	(Spain) Arantxa Sánchez Vicario	2	San Diego, United States	Hard	F	6–2, 6–1	1
118.	(Argentina) Gabriela Sabatini	10	Montreal, Canada	Hard	QF	7–5, 6–0	1
119.	(France) Mary Pierce	5	Montreal, Canada	Hard	SF	6–3, 6–4	1
120.	(Czech Republic) Jana Novotná	8	US Open, New York	Hard	SF	6–3, 7–5	1
1995
121.	(Czech Republic) Jana Novotná	5	Paris, France	Hard (i)	SF	6–2, 6–3	2
122.	(France) Mary Pierce	3	Paris, France	Hard (i)	F	6–2, 6–2	2
123.	(Germany) Anke Huber	10	Delray Beach, United States	Hard	SF	6–4, 6–4	2
124.	(Spain) Conchita Martínez	4	Delray Beach, United States	Hard	F	6–2, 6–4	2
125.	(Belarus) Natasha Zvereva	8	Miami, United States	Hard	QF	6–4, 7–6^{(7–5)}	2
126.	(Czech Republic) Jana Novotná	5	Miami, United States	Hard	SF	6–2, 7–5	2
127.	(Japan) Kimiko Date	9	Miami, United States	Hard	F	6–1, 6–4	2
128.	(Argentina) Gabriela Sabatini	8	French Open, Paris	Clay	QF	6–1, 6–0	2
129.	(Spain) Conchita Martínez	4	French Open, Paris	Clay	SF	6–3, 6–7^{(5–7)}, 6–3	2
130.	(Spain) Arantxa Sánchez Vicario	1	French Open, Paris, France	Clay	F	7–5, 4–6, 6–0	2
131.	(Czech Republic) Jana Novotná	5	Wimbledon, United Kingdom	Grass	SF	5–7, 6–4, 6–2	1
132.	(Spain) Arantxa Sánchez Vicario	2	Wimbledon, United Kingdom	Grass	F	4–6, 6–1, 7–5	1
133.	(Argentina) Gabriela Sabatini	8	US Open, New York	Hard	SF	6–4, 7–6^{(7–5)}	1
134.	(United States) Monica Seles	1	US Open, New York, United States	Hard	F	7–6^{(8–6)}, 0–6, 6–3	1
135.	(United States) Mary Joe Fernández	8	WTA Tour Championships, New York, United States	Carpet (i)	QF	6–3, 6–4	1
1996
136.	(Spain) Conchita Martínez	2	Indian Wells, United States	Hard	F	7–6^{(7–5)}, 7–6^{(7–5)}	1
137.	(Japan) Kimiko Date	8	Miami, United States	Hard	QF	7–6^{(7–4)}, 6–3	1
138.	(United States) Chanda Rubin	9	Miami, United States	Hard	F	6–1, 6–3	1
139.	(Croatia) Iva Majoli	4	Berlin, Germany	Clay	SF	7–5, 6–1	1
140.	(Croatia) Iva Majoli	4	French Open, Paris, France	Clay	QF	6–3, 6–1	1
141.	(Spain) Conchita Martínez	2	French Open, Paris	Clay	SF	6–3, 6–1	1
142.	(Spain) Arantxa Sánchez Vicario	3	French Open, Paris	Clay	F	6–3, 6–7^{(4–7)}, 10–8	1
143.	(Czech Republic) Jana Novotná	6	Wimbledon, United Kingdom	Grass	QF	6–3, 6–2	1
144.	(Spain) Arantxa Sánchez Vicario	3	Wimbledon, United Kingdom	Grass	F	6–3, 7–5	1
145.	(United States) Monica Seles	1	US Open, New York	Hard	F	7–5, 6–4	1
146.	(United States) Lindsay Davenport	8	WTA Tour Championships, New York, United States	Carpet (i)	QF	6–4, 7–6^{(13–11)}	1
147.	(Czech Republic) Jana Novotná	5	WTA Tour Championships, New York, United States	Carpet (i)	SF	4–6, 6–4, 6–3	1
148.	(Switzerland) Martina Hingis	7	WTA Tour Championships, New York, United States	Carpet (i)	F	6–3, 4–6, 6–0, 4–6, 6–0	1
1997
149.	(Croatia) Iva Majoli	7	Tokyo, Japan	Hard	QF	6–2, 6–3	1
1998
150.	(United States) Lindsay Davenport	2	New Haven, United States	Hard	SF	6–3, 7–6^{(8–6)}	38
151.	(Czech Republic) Jana Novotná	3	New Haven, United States	Hard	F	6–4, 6–1	38
152.	(France) Nathalie Tauziat	9	Leipzig, Germany	Carpet (i)	F	6–3, 6–4	22
153.	(Switzerland) Martina Hingis	2	Philadelphia, United Kingdom	Carpet (i)	QF	6–2, 4–6, 6–0	17
154.	(France) Nathalie Tauziat	9	Philadelphia, United Kingdom	Carpet (i)	SF	6–1, 6–4	17
155.	(United States) Lindsay Davenport	1	Philadelphia, United Kingdom	Carpet (i)	F	4–6, 6–3, 6–4	17
156.	(Czech Republic) Jana Novotná	3	WTA Tour Championships, New York, United States	Carpet (i)	1R	6–7^{(5–7)}, 6–4, 6–1	12
157.	(United States) Monica Seles	6	WTA Tour Championships, New York, United States	Carpet (i)	QF	1–6, 6–4, 6–4	12
1999
158.	(United States) Venus Williams	4	Sydney, Australia	Hard	QF	4–6, 6–2, 6–4	10
159.	(Czech Republic) Jana Novotná	4	Indian Wells, United States	Hard	QF	6–2, 6–0	7
160.	(United States) Lindsay Davenport	2	French Open, Paris	Clay	QF	6–1, 6–7^{(5–7)}, 6–3	6
161.	(United States) Monica Seles	3	French Open, Paris	Clay	SF	6–7^{(2–7)}, 6–3, 6–4	6
162.	(Switzerland) Martina Hingis	1	French Open, Paris	Clay	F	4–6, 7–5, 6–2	6
163.	(United States) Venus Williams	5	Wimbledon, United Kingdom	Grass	QF	6–2, 3–6, 6–4	3

== Double bagel matches (6-0, 6-0) ==
Year	No.	Tournament	Surface	Opponent	Round
1983	1.	Wimbledon, United Kingdom	Grass	(United Kingdom) Heidi Narborough	Q
1984	2.	Family Circle Cup, Hilton Head, U.S.	Clay	(Czechoslovakia) Yvona Brzáková	Q
1987	3.	Virginia Slims of Florida, Boca Raton, U.S.	Hard	(United Kingdom) Sara Gomer	R16
1987	4.	Wimbledon, United Kingdom	Grass	(Denmark) Tine Scheuer-Larsen	R16
1987	5.	LA Women's Tennis Championships, Los Angeles, U.S.	Hard	(France) Pascale Paradis-Mangon	R16
1988	6.	French Open, Paris	Clay	(Soviet Union) Natasha Zvereva	Final
1988	7.	Wimbledon, United Kingdom	Grass	(United States) Hu Na	R128
1988	8.	WTA Hamburg, Germany	Clay	(Italy) Raffaella Reggi	QF
1989	9.	Australian Open, Melbourne	Hard	(Canada) Rene Simpson	R64
1989	10.	Virginia Slims of Washington, Washington, D.C.., U.S.	Carpet	(Canada) Carling Bassett-Seguso	R16
1989	11.	German Open Tennis Championships, Berlin	Clay	(Brazil) Niege Dias	R16
1989	12.	Southern California Open, Carlsbad, U.S.	Hard	(Canada) Rene Simpson	R32
1989	13.	Southern California Open, Carlsbad, U.S.	Hard	(Germany) Claudia Kohde-Kilsch	QF
1989	14.	WTA New Jersey, Mahwah, U.S.	Hard	(United States) Kim Kessaris	R32
1989	15.	Brighton International, United Kingdom	Carpet	(Italy) Laura Garrone	R32
1991	16.	US Open, New York	Hard	(United Kingdom) Catherine Mothes-Jobkel	R64
1992	17.	Ameritech Cup, Chicago, U.S.	Carpet	(Japan) Rika Hiraki	R16
1992	18.	Fed Cup	Clay	(Poland) Katarzyna Nowak	QF
1993	19.	Wimbledon, UK	Grass	(Australia) Kirrily Sharpe	R128
1993	20.	Wimbledon, UK	Grass	(Canada) Helen Kelesi	R32
1994	21.	State Farm Evert Cup, Indian Wells, U.S.	Hard	(United States) Tracy Austin	QF
1994	22.	WTA Hamburg, Germany	Clay	(Germany) Silke Frankl	R32

== Awards ==
- 1986: Most Improved Player, by the Women's Tennis Association (WTA)
- 1987 Player of the Year, by the WTA
- 1987 World Champion, by the International Tennis Federation (ITF)
- 1988 Player of the Year, by the WTA
- 1988 World Champion, by the ITF
- 1988 BBC Overseas Sports Personality of the Year
- 1989 Player of the Year, by the WTA
- 1989 World Champion, by the ITF
- 1989 Female Athlete of the Year, by the Associated Press
- 1990 Player of the Year, by the WTA
- 1990 World Champion, by the ITF
- 1993 Player of the Year, by the WTA
- 1993 World Champion, by the ITF
- 1994 Player of the Year, by the WTA
- 1995 Player of the Year, by the WTA
- 1995 World Champion, by the ITF
- 1996 Player of the Year, by the WTA
- 1996 World Champion, by the ITF
- 1996 Most Exciting Player of the Year, by the WTA
- 1998 Most Exciting Player of the Year, by the WTA
- 1999 Most Exciting Player of the Year, by the WTA
- 1999 Prince of Asturias Award, one of the most important awards of Spain and named after the heir apparent of Spain, Prince Felipe
- 1999 Germany Television Award for her outstanding performance as tennis player and her importance to the German public.
- 1999 Athlete of the Century for the category Female Athlete in Ballsports by a panel of the International Olympic Committee (IOC)
- 1999 The Greatest Female Tennis Player of the 20th century, by a panel of tennis experts assembled by the Associated Press
- 1999 Female Athlete of the Year, by the German television broadcaster ARD
- 1999 Female Sports Award of the Last Decade, by ESPY
- 1999 Olympic Order granted by Dr. Antonio Samaranch, president of the IOC
- 2002 Medal of Honor, bestowed by the prime minister of Graf's home state Baden-Württemberg, Erwin Teufel
- 2004 Inducted into the International Tennis Hall of Fame
- 2008 Cross of the Order of Merit awarded to her by German Federal President Horst Köhler
- 2009 Wilson award for public service.

== Special honours ==
- Graf is the only female athlete in the list of Forbes Top-30 Most recognizable and marketable athletes in 1995.
- Selected for European Heroes in 2004 and 2005 by TIME Magazine.
- Voted Germans greatest role model by TV14 magazine, 2004.
- Voted Most admirable German woman by Amica magazine, 2005.
- Voted Germany's Sportswoman of the Century in 1999 by the German press.
- Graf is the only person to have won the 'Golden Slam' (1988)
- Graf is the first German to win the Spain's 'Prince of Asturias' award.
- Chosen by World Economic Forum As Young Global Leader for 2008
- Godmother of the Navigator of The Seas (Royal Caribbean Cruiselines), 2002
- Stefanie Graf was awarded with the Golden Sports Pyramid, the highest distinction of the German Sports Fund in Herzogenaurach by the Adidas chairman Herbert Hainer on 24 June 2008. She was also inducted to the German Sport Hall of Fame.
- Voted The best female role model in sports in a survey by Barclays, sponsors of the Premier League, 2010.
- Nominated and voted the title Mother of the nation in her country, Germany, 2010.

== Exhibition singles tournaments ==
=== Singles: 4 (4 titles) ===
Outcome	Year	Tournament	Surface	Opponent	Score
Winner	1988	Gunze World Tennis (Osaka)	Carpet (i)	(Bulgaria) Manuela Maleeva	6–0, 6–0
Winner	1990	Pathmark Tennis Classic (Mahwah)	Hard	(United States) Jennifer Capriati	6–4, 6–3
Winner	1994	Pathmark Tennis Classic (Mahwah)	Hard	(United States) Lisa Raymond	4–6, 6–4, 6–1
Winner	1998	A&P Tennis Classic (Mahwah)	Hard	(South Africa) Amanda Coetzer	6–3, 6–3
