= 1993 Autoglass Classic – Singles =

Singles
- 1993 Autoglass Classic

Final
- Champion: (Czech Republic) Jana Novotná
- Runner-up: (Germany) Anke Huber
- Score: 6–2, 6–4

Details
- Draw: 32 (3WC/4Q)
- Seeds: 8

Events
Singles	Doubles
← 1992 ·	Brighton International	· 1994 →

Steffi Graf was the defending champion, but did not compete this year.

Jana Novotná won the title by defeating Anke Huber 6–2, 6–4 in the final.

== Seeds ==
1. (Czech Republic) Jana Novotná (champion)
2. (Germany) Anke Huber (final)
3. (France) Mary Pierce (semifinals)
4. (Bulgaria) Katerina Maleeva (quarterfinals)
5. (United States) Patty Fendick (semifinals)
6. (Latvia) Larisa Neiland (second round)
7. (Georgia (country)) Leila Meskhi (second round)
8. (United States) Ginger Helgeson (first round)

== Draw ==
=== Key ===
- Q = Qualifier
- WC = Wild card
- LL = Lucky loser
- Alt = Alternate
- SE = Special exempt
- PR = Protected ranking
- ITF = ITF entry
- JE = Junior exempt
- w/o = Walkover
- r = Retired
- d = Defaulted
- SR = Special ranking

=== Finals ===
Semifinals
1	(Czech Republic) Jana Novotná	4	6	6
5	(United States) Patty Fendick	6	0	3
3	(France) Mary Pierce	6	4	4
2	(Germany) Anke Huber	3	6	6

Final
1	(Czech Republic) Jana Novotná	6	6
2	(Germany) Anke Huber	2	4

=== Top half ===
First round
1	(Czech Republic) J Novotná	6	6
(Japan) R Hiraki	3	1
(Germany) P Begerow	5	6^{5}
(Germany) C Porwik	7	7^{7}
(United Kingdom) J Durie	6^{?}	5
Q	(Netherlands) M Bollegraf	7^{?}	7
(South Africa) E Reinach	6	6
8	(United States) G Helgeson	3	3
4	(Bulgaria) K Maleeva	6	6
(Austria) P Ritter	3	3
Q	(Canada) J Nejedly	3	0
(Italy) L Golarsa	6	6
(United States) A Henricksson	4	3
(Ukraine) M Medvedeva	6	6
(United States) N Arendt	4	3
5	(United States) P Fendick	6	6

Second round
1	(Czech Republic) J Novotná	6	6
(Germany) C Porwik	1	0
Q	(Netherlands) M Bollegraf	7^{7}	1	6^{2}
(South Africa) E Reinach	6^{4}	6	7^{7}
4	(Bulgaria) K Maleeva	6	6
(Italy) L Golarsa	3	2
(Ukraine) M Medvedeva	3	3
5	(United States) P Fendick	6	6

Quarterfinals
1	(Czech Republic) J Novotná	6	6
(South Africa) E Reinach	1	1
4	(Bulgaria) K Maleeva	4	4
5	(United States) P Fendick	6	6

Semifinals
1	(Czech Republic) J Novotná	4	6	6
5	(United States) P Fendick	6	0	3

=== Bottom half ===
First round
7	(Georgia (country)) L Meskhi	6	6
(United States) K Adams	4	4
(United Kingdom) C Wood	6	7^{7}
(United States) A Frazier	3	6^{1}
WC	(Australia) E Smylie	7	6
(Czech Republic) A Strnadová	5	3
(Belgium) N Feber	3	2
3	(France) M Pierce	6	6
6	(Latvia) L Neiland	7^{?}	6
WC	(United Kingdom) J Pullin	6^{?}	4
Q	(United Kingdom) K Cross	1	0
(Germany) C Singer	6	6
Q	(United States) A Mall	0	1
(Romania) I Spîrlea	6	6
WC	(United Kingdom) A Wainwright	0	3
2	(Germany) A Huber	6	6

Second round
7	(Georgia (country)) L Meskhi	3	6^{5}
(United Kingdom) C Wood	6	7^{7}
WC	(Australia) E Smylie	2	0
3	(France) M Pierce	6	6
6	(Latvia) L Neiland	4	2
(Germany) C Singer	6	6
(Romania) I Spîrlea	6	3	4
2	(Germany) A Huber	4	6	6

Quarterfinals
(United Kingdom) C Wood	6	1	1
3	(France) M Pierce	2	6	6
(Germany) C Singer	1	0
2	(Germany) A Huber	6	6

Semifinals
3	(France) M Pierce	6	4	4
2	(Germany) A Huber	3	6	6
