= 1990 Midland Bank Championships – Singles =

Singles
- 1990 Midland Bank Championships

Final
- Champion: (West Germany) Steffi Graf
- Runner-up: (Czechoslovakia) Helena Suková
- Score: 7–5, 6–3

Details
- Draw: 32 (4Q/1LL)
- Seeds: 8

Events
Singles	Doubles
← 1989 ·	Brighton International	· 1991 →

Steffi Graf won her third consecutive title at Brighton, after defeating Helena Suková 7–5, 6–3 in the final.

== Seeds ==
1. (West Germany) Steffi Graf (champion)
2. (Bulgaria) Katerina Maleeva (semifinals)
3. (n/a)
4. (Czechoslovakia) Helena Suková (final)
5. (Soviet Union) Natasha Zvereva (first round)
6. (France) Nathalie Tauziat (quarterfinals)
7. (Italy) Sandra Cecchini (quarterfinals)
8. (Belgium) Sabine Appelmans (second round)

== Draw ==
=== Key ===
- Q = Qualifier
- WC = Wild card
- LL = Lucky loser
- Alt = Alternate
- SE = Special exempt
- PR = Protected ranking
- ITF = ITF entry
- JE = Junior exempt
- w/o = Walkover
- r = Retired
- d = Defaulted
- SR = Special ranking

=== Finals ===
Semifinals
1	(West Germany) Steffi Graf	6	7
(Sweden) Catarina Lindqvist	2	5
4	(Czechoslovakia) Helena Suková	6	6	6
2	(Bulgaria) Katerina Maleeva	4	7	3

Final
1	(West Germany) Steffi Graf	7	6
4	(Czechoslovakia) Helena Suková	5	3

=== Top half ===
First round
1	(West Germany) S Graf	6	6
(Sweden) C Dahlman	2	2
(West Germany) C Kohde-Kilsch	6	5
(France) N Herreman	7	7
Q	(France) C Suire	6	7
LL	(Belgium) A Devries	4	5
(United Kingdom) S Loosemore	1	2
6	(France) N Tauziat	6	6
5	(Soviet Union) N Zvereva	3	3
(United Kingdom) C Wood	6	6
(Sweden) C Lindqvist	3	6	6
(United Kingdom) J Durie	6	4	2
(Switzerland) C Caverzasio	6	7
(France) C Tanvier	2	5
(Italy) L Garrone	6	4	2
8	(Belgium) S Appelmans	2	6	6

Second round
1	(West Germany) S Graf	6	6
(France) N Herreman	4	2
Q	(France) C Suire	6	4
6	(France) N Tauziat	7	6
(United Kingdom) C Wood	2	0
(Sweden) C Lindqvist	6	6
(Switzerland) C Caverzasio	6	7
8	(Belgium) S Appelmans	2	5

Quarterfinals
1	(West Germany) S Graf	6	6
6	(France) N Tauziat	2	4
(Sweden) C Lindqvist	6	6
(Switzerland) C Caverzasio	2	3

Semifinals
1	(West Germany) S Graf	6	7
(Sweden) C Lindqvist	2	5

=== Bottom half ===
First round
(Australia) R McQuillan	1	1
(United Kingdom) S Gomer	6	6
Q	(United Kingdom) J Salmon	6	6	3
(Peru) P Vásquez	4	7	6
(United States) D Faber	4	2
(Bulgaria) M Maleeva	6	6
Q	(Soviet Union) V Milvidskaia	4	6
4	(Czechoslovakia) H Suková	6	7
7	(Italy) S Cecchini	6	6
(United Kingdom) B Borneo	3	4
(Czechoslovakia) D Krajčovičová	5	3
(Austria) S Dopfer	7	6
Q	(United Kingdom) K Hand	7	7
(Netherlands) B Schultz	6	6
(Finland) P Thorén	3	7	3
2	(Bulgaria) K Maleeva	6	5	6

Second round
(United Kingdom) S Gomer	6	6	6
(Peru) P Vásquez	7	4	4
(Bulgaria) M Maleeva	4	1
4	(Czechoslovakia) H Suková	6	6
7	(Italy) S Cecchini	7	6
(Austria) S Dopfer	6	3
Q	(United Kingdom) K Hand	2	2
2	(Bulgaria) K Maleeva	6	6

Quarterfinals
(United Kingdom) S Gomer	1	1
4	(Czechoslovakia) H Suková	6	6
7	(Italy) S Cecchini	5	0
2	(Bulgaria) K Maleeva	7	6

Semifinals
4	(Czechoslovakia) H Suková	6	6	6
2	(Bulgaria) K Maleeva	4	7	3
