= Stacey Martin =

American tennis player

- Full name: Stacey Martin
- Country (sports): United States
- Born: November 13, 1970 (age 54)
- Prize money: $174,344

Singles
- Career record: 107–117
- Highest ranking: No. 58 (October 23, 1989)

Grand Slam singles results
- Australian Open: 2R (1991)
- French Open: 3R (1990)
- Wimbledon: 1R (1989, 1991)
- US Open: 2R (1989)

Doubles
- Career record: 3–14

Stacey Martin (born November 13, 1970) is a former professional tennis player from the United States.

== Biography ==
Martin comes from Largo, Maryland, near Washington DC. One of three siblings that played tennis, she began at the age of five and was coached initially by her father. She went to school at Elizabeth Seton High in Bladensburg and later trained at a North Carolina tennis academy run by Gary Johnson.

Before turning professional she took up an athletic scholarship to the University of Tennessee, where she played No. 1 tennis from her freshman year.

As a professional player she made it to as high as 58 in the world. She was a semi-finalist at the 1988 Schenectady Open and did well at the same tournament again in 1989 with a quarter-final appearance. At the 1989 United Jersey Bank Classic she had a win over second seed Pam Shriver en route to the semi-finals. She made the third round of the 1990 French Open.

She was one of the highest ranked African American tennis players of her era, along with Katrina Adams, Camille Benjamin, Zina Garrison and Lori McNeil.
