= 1989 United Jersey Bank Classic =

- Date: August 14–20
- Edition: 12th
- Category: Category 3
- Draw: 28S / 16D
- Prize money: $200,000
- Surface: Hard / outdoor
- Location: Mahwah, New Jersey, U.S.

Champions

Singles
- (West Germany) Steffi Graf

Doubles
- (West Germany) Steffi Graf / (United States) Pam Shriver
← 1988 ·	WTA New Jersey

The 1989 United Jersey Bank Classic was a women's tennis tournament played on outdoor hard courts in Mahwah, New Jersey in the United States that was part of the Category 3 tier of the 1989 WTA Tour. It was the 12th and last edition of the tournament and was held from August 14 through August 20, 1989. First-seeded Steffi Graf won her second consecutive singles title and third in total and earned $40,000 first-prize money.

== Finals ==
=== Singles ===
(West Germany) Steffi Graf defeated (Hungary) Andrea Temesvári 7–5, 6–2

- It was Graf's 10th singles title of the year and the 40th of her career.

=== Doubles ===
(West Germany) Steffi Graf / (United States) Pam Shriver defeated (United States) Louise Allen / (Peru) Laura Gildemeister 6–2, 6–4

- It was Graf's 11th title of the year and the 49th of her career. It was Shriver's 6th title of the year and the 122nd of her career.
