= 1989 United Jersey Bank Classic – Doubles =

Doubles
- 1989 United Jersey Bank Classic
- 1988 Champions: (Czechoslovakia) Jana Novotná (Czechoslovakia) Helena Suková

Final
- Champions: (West Germany) Steffi Graf (United States) Pam Shriver
- Runners-up: (United States) Louise Allen (Peru) Laura Gildemeister
- Score: 6–2, 6–4

Details
- Draw: 16
- Seeds: 4

Events
Singles	Doubles
← 1988 ·	United Jersey Bank Classic

Jana Novotná and Helena Suková were the defending champions but only Novotná competed that year with Catarina Lindqvist.

Lindqvist and Novotná lost in the semifinals to Louise Allen and Laura Gildemeister.

Steffi Graf and Pam Shriver won in the final 6–2, 6–4 against Allen and Gildemeister.

== Seeds ==
Champion seeds are indicated in bold text while text in italics indicates the round in which those seeds were eliminated.

1. (West Germany) **Steffi Graf** / (United States) **Pam Shriver (champions)**
2. (Sweden) Catarina Lindqvist / (Czechoslovakia) Jana Novotná (semifinals)
3. (United States) Sandy Collins / (Hungary) Andrea Temesvári (first round)
4. (United States) Mary Lou Daniels / (United States) Wendy White (semifinals)

== Draw ==
=== Key ===
- Q = Qualifier
- WC = Wild card
- LL = Lucky loser
- Alt = Alternate
- SE = Special exempt
- PR = Protected ranking
- ITF = ITF entry
- JE = Junior exempt
- w/o = Walkover
- r = Retired
- d = Defaulted
- SR = Special ranking

First round
1	(West Germany) **S Graf** (United States) **P Shriver**	**6**	4	**6**
(France) S Amiach (United States) K Rinaldi	3	**6**	3
(Czechoslovakia) **P Langrová** (Czechoslovakia) **E Švíglerová**	**6**	**7**
(Bulgaria) K Maleeva (Bulgaria) M Maleeva	2	6
4	(United States) **M L Daniels** (United States) **W White**	**6**	**6**
(United States) T Phelps (United States) M Van Nostrand	4	2
(Australia) L Field (United States) B Herr	4	1
(United States) **M McGrath** (United States) **J Smoller**	**6**	**6**
(Italy) **L Ferrando** (United States) **J Thomas**	**6**	**6**
(Poland) R Baranski (United States) S Schenck	1	4
(United States) **L Allen** (Peru) **L Gildemeister**	**7**	**6**
3	(United States) S Collins (Hungary) A Temesvári	6	3
(United States) **P O'Reilly** (United States) **T O'Reilly**	**6**	**6**
(United States) D Faber (United States) J Prah	2	3
(Switzerland) E Krapl (France) P Paradis	2	1
2	(Sweden) **C Lindqvist** (Czechoslovakia) **J Novotná**	**6**	**6**

Quarterfinals
1	(West Germany) **S Graf** (United States) **P Shriver**	**6**	**6**
(Czechoslovakia) P Langrová (Czechoslovakia) E Švíglerová	0	1
4	(United States) **M L Daniels** (United States) **W White**	5	**6**	**6**
(United States) M McGrath (United States) J Smoller	**7**	2	3
(Italy) L Ferrando (United States) J Thomas	5	6
(United States) **L Allen** (Peru) **L Gildemeister**	**7**	**7**
(United States) P O'Reilly (United States) T O'Reilly	1	4
2	(Sweden) **C Lindqvist** (Czechoslovakia) **J Novotná**	**6**	**6**

Semifinals
1	(West Germany) **S Graf** (United States) **P Shriver**	**6**	**6**
4	(United States) M L Daniels (United States) W White	2	1
(United States) **L Allen** (Peru) **L Gildemeister**	4	**6**	**6**
2	(Sweden) C Lindqvist (Czechoslovakia) J Novotná	**6**	2	1

Final
1	(West Germany) **Steffi Graf** (United States) **Pam Shriver**	**6**	**6**
(United States) Louise Allen (Peru) Laura Gildemeister	2	4
