= 1990 Midland Bank Championships =

- Date: 23–28 October
- Edition: 13th
- Category: Tier II
- Draw: 32S / 16D
- Prize money: $350,000
- Surface: Carpet (Supreme) / indoor
- Location: Brighton, England
- Venue: Brighton Centre

Champions

Singles
- (West Germany) Steffi Graf

Doubles
- (Czechoslovakia) Helena Suková / (France) Nathalie Tauziat
- Brighton International

The 1990 Midland Group Championships was a women's tennis tournament played on indoor carpet courts at the Brighton Centre in Brighton, England that was part of the Tier II of the 1990 WTA Tour. It was the 13th edition of the tournament and was held from 23 October until 28 October 1990. First-seeded Steffi Graf won the singles title, her third consecutive at the event and fourth in total, and earned $70,000 first-prize money.

== Finals ==
=== Singles ===
(West Germany) Steffi Graf defeated (Czechoslovakia) Helena Suková 7–5, 6–3

- It was Graf's 9th singles title of the year and the 53rd of her career.

=== Doubles ===
(Czechoslovakia) Helena Suková / (France) Nathalie Tauziat defeated (United Kingdom) Jo Durie / (Soviet Union) Natasha Zvereva 6–1, 6–4
