= 1987 United Jersey Bank Classic =

- Date: August 24–30
- Edition: 10th
- Category: Category 3
- Draw: 28S / 16D
- Prize money: $150,000
- Surface: Hard / outdoor
- Location: Mahwah, New Jersey, U.S.
- Venue: Ramapo College

Champions

Singles
- (Bulgaria) Manuela Maleeva

Doubles
- (United States) Gigi Fernández / (United States) Lori McNeil
- WTA New Jersey

The 1987 United Jersey Bank Classic was a women's tennis tournament played on outdoor hard courts at the Ramapo College in Mahwah, New Jersey in the United States and was part of Category 3 tier of the 1987 Virginia Slims World Championship Series. It was the 10th edition of the tournament and was held from August 24 through August 30, 1987. Third-seeded Manuela Maleeva won the singles title.

== Finals ==
=== Singles ===
(Bulgaria) Manuela Maleeva defeated (West Germany) Sylvia Hanika 1–6, 6–4, 6–1

=== Doubles ===
(United States) Gigi Fernández / (United States) Lori McNeil defeated (United Kingdom) Anne Hobbs / (Australia) Elizabeth Smylie 6–3, 6–2
