= 1992 Midland Bank Championships =

- Date: 20–25 October
- Edition: 15th
- Category: Tier II
- Draw: 32S / 16D
- Prize money: $350,000
- Surface: Carpet (Supreme) / indoor
- Location: Brighton, England
- Venue: Brighton Centre

Champions

Singles
- (Germany) Steffi Graf

Doubles
- (Czechoslovakia) Jana Novotná / (Latvia) Larisa Savchenko-Neiland
- Brighton International

The 1992 Midland Group Championships was a women's tennis tournament played on indoor carpet courts at the Brighton Centre in Brighton, England that was part of the Tier II of the 1992 WTA Tour. It was the 15th edition of the tournament and was held from 20 October until 25 October 1992. First-seeded Steffi Graf won the singles title, her fifth consecutive at the event and sixth in total, and earned $70,000 first-prize money.

== Finals ==
=== Singles ===
(Germany) Steffi Graf defeated (Czechoslovakia) Jana Novotná 4–6, 6–4, 7–6^{(7–3)}

- It was Graf's 7th singles title of the year and the 68th of her career.

=== Doubles ===
(Czechoslovakia) Jana Novotná / (Latvia) Larisa Savchenko-Neiland defeated (Spain) Conchita Martínez / (Czechoslovakia) Radka Zrubáková 6–4, 6–1
