= WTA Finals =

Season-ending championship in women's tennis

- 2026 WTA Finals

WTA Tour
- Founded: 1972; 54 years ago
- Editions: 54 (2025)
- Location: Indian Wells, United States (2026)
- Venue: Indian Wells Tennis Garden
- Category: WTA Finals
- Surface: Hard - indoors
- Draw: 8S / 8D (since 2014)
- Prize money: $10M
- Website: wtafinals.com

Current champions (2026)
- Singles: Mirra Andreeva (Note: On 1 March 2022, the WTA announced that players from Russia will not be allowed to compete under the name or flag of Russia following the 2022 Russian invasion of Ukraine. Mirra Andreeva, Veronika Kudermetova and Vera Zvonareva thus competed as neutral players since then, so Andreeva's one singles title, Kudermetova's two doubles titles and Zvonareva's one doubles title are not attributed to Russia in the "Titles by country" list.)
- Doubles: (Czech Republic) Kateřina Siniaková (United States) Taylor Townsend

The WTA Finals (formerly known as the WTA Tour Championships or WTA Championships) is the season-ending championship of the WTA Tour. It is the most significant tennis event in the women's annual calendar after the four majors, as it features the top eight singles players and top eight doubles teams based on their results throughout the season. The eighth spot is reserved, if needed, for a player or team who won a major in the current year and is ranked from ninth to twentieth.

The tournament predates the WTA Tour and started in 1972 as the championship tournament of the Tour's predecessor: the Virginia Slims Circuit. Since 2003, the tournament has used a unique format not seen in other WTA Tour events: the players are separated into two groups of four, within which they each play three round-robin matches. The top two players or teams from each group after the round-robin stage move on to a knock-out format in the semifinals and final to determine the champion.

The WTA Finals has the largest prize money and ranking points after the majors. The most successful player in both singles and doubles history is Martina Navratilova, with eight singles and 13 doubles titles.

In the tournament's current format, the champion can earn a maximum of 1,500 ranking points, if they win the event as an undefeated champion in the round-robin stage.

== Tournament ==
=== History ===
The championships were held for the first time in October 1972 in Boca Raton, Florida (USA) as a climactic event at the end of a series of tournaments sponsored by Virginia Slims, called the Virginia Slims Circuit. From 1972 to 1974, the event was held in October, before switching to March from 1975 until 1986. The WTA then decided to adopt a January–November playing season, and so the event was switched to being held at the end of each year. As a consequence, there were two championships held in 1986.

The event was held in Los Angeles, California from 1974 to 1976 before moving to Madison Square Garden in New York City in 1977. With the exception of a one-year move to Oakland, California in 1978, the Championships remained at MSG until 2000. The event then briefly moved to Munich, Germany in 2001. More recently, it moved back to Los Angeles from 2002 to 2005. The 2006 and 2007 editions were held in Madrid, Spain. Doha, Qatar hosted the 2008–2010 editions before passing the flag to Istanbul, Turkey, which hosted the 2011–2013 editions. For the right to host the 2014 edition and beyond, 43 cities expressed an interest before a short list comprising Kazan, Russia; Mexico City, Mexico; Singapore; and Tianjin, China was drawn up in late 2012. Kazan and Mexico City were ruled out in early 2013 before Singapore was announced in May 2013 as the new host city for five years. In 2018, the WTA announced the host city from 2019 to 2028 would be Shenzhen, China, however due to COVID-19, the tournament was cancelled in 2020 and had to find alternative hosting sites from 2020 to 2023. In April 2024, the WTA announced that the host city from 2024 to 2026 would be Riyadh, Saudi Arabia. The decision sparked criticism and protests from many quarters, including a few top players, due to the country's ongoing human rights's and women's policies.

=== Format ===
From 1984 to 1998, the final of the championships was a best-of-five-sets match, making it the only tournament on the women's tour to have had a best-of-five match at any round of the competition. It was the first time since the 1901 U.S. National Championships that the best-of-five format was used in women's matches. In 1999, the final reverted to being a best-of-three-sets match. From the 1974 until the 1982 edition the doubles draw consisted of four teams; then from 1983 to 2002 the draw increased to eight teams; was decreased back to four teams until 2013 and from the 2014 edition onward it has been made up of eight teams. From its first inception in 1973 until 2018 the doubles draw was played in a single elimination format. In 2015 and from 2019 until the present the doubles draw has been played in a round robin format.

Qualified players and teams participate in a round-robin format in two groups of four. The winners and runners-up of each group advance to the semifinals. The semifinal winners progress through to the finals where they compete for the title.

=== Qualification ===
To qualify for the WTA Finals, players compete throughout the year in WTA events throughout the world, as well as the ITF-sanctioned events, such as the four Grand Slams. Players earn ranking points on the leaderboard, and the top seven singles players and top seven doubles teams on this leaderboard at the conclusion of the WTA season (as of the Monday following the final regular season tournament) earn the right to compete in the WTA Finals. The eighth spot in the WTA Finals is awarded to the highest-ranking Grand Slam winner (and highest-ranking Grand Slam winning team for doubles) ranked 8-20 in the standings. If no player (and/or doubles team) meets this criterion, then the 8th ranked player (and/or doubles team) in the standings qualifies.

In singles, point totals are calculated by combining points from up to 18 tournaments. Of these tournaments, a player's point total is calculated based on the following: the four Grand Slam events, best six results of the seven combined WTA 1000 tournaments, best result of the three non-combined WTA 1000 tournaments, and lastly the next best seven results from all non-125 WTA tournaments. In doubles, point totals are calculated by the 12 best results among any of the non-125 WTA tournaments and Grand Slams.

== Venues ==
Years	City	Country	Venue	Surface	Capacity
1972–73	Boca Raton	United States	Boca Raton Hotel & Club	Clay	
1974–76	Los Angeles	United States	Los Angeles Memorial Sports Arena	Carpet	14,800
1977	New York City	United States	Madison Square Garden	Carpet	18,000
1978	Oakland	United States	Oakland Arena	Carpet	13,200
1979–2000	New York City	United States	Madison Square Garden	Carpet	18,000
2001	Munich	Germany	Olympiahalle	Hard (i)	12,000
2002–05	Los Angeles	United States	Staples Center	Hard (i)	17,000
2006–07	Madrid	Spain	Madrid Arena	Hard (i)	10,500
2008–10	Doha	Qatar	Khalifa International Tennis and Squash Complex	Hard	6,911
2011–13	Istanbul	Turkey	Sinan Erdem Dome	Hard (i)	16,410
2014–18	Singapore	Singapore	Singapore Indoor Stadium	Hard (i)	10,000
2019	Shenzhen	China	Shenzhen Bay Sports Center	Hard (i)	12,000
2021	Guadalajara	Mexico	Panamerican Tennis Center	Hard	6,639
2022	Fort Worth	United States	Dickies Arena	Hard (i)	14,000
2023	Cancún	Mexico	Estadio Paradisus	Hard	4,300
2024–25	Riyadh	Saudi Arabia	King Saud University Indoor Arena	Hard (i)	4,000
2026	Indian Wells	United States	Indian Wells Tennis Garden	Hard	8,000
2027–29	Charlotte	United States	Spectrum Center	Hard	TBC

== Prize money and points ==
The total prize money for the 2026 WTA Finals is US$10,000,000, with $8 million allocated to singles and $2 million to doubles. This represents a decrease of 35.48%, or $5.5 million, compared with the $15,500,000 offered at the 2025 WTA Finals in Riyadh.

An undefeated singles champion can earn a maximum of $3,370,000, down 35.63% from $5,235,000 in 2025, while an undefeated doubles team can earn $725,000, a decrease of 36.35% from the previous year.

By comparison, the 2026 ATP Finals offers total prize money of $15,750,000, an increase of 1.61% from 2025. The ATP Finals prize fund is therefore $5,750,000, or 57.50%, higher than that of the WTA Finals in 2026, following equal total prize money at the two tournaments in 2024 and 2025.

The following table details the 2026 prize money and ranking points for singles and doubles. Participation fees are prorated according to the number of round-robin matches played.

Stage	Prize money		Points
Stage	Singles	Doubles (Note: Prize money for doubles is per team.)	Points
Champion	RR (Note: RR means prize money or points won in the round-robin stage.) + $2,460,000	RR + $485,000	RR + 900
Runner-up	RR + $820,000	RR + $155,000	RR + 400
Round-robin win per match	+$230,000	+$50,000	200
Participation fee	$220,000	$90,000	—N/a
Alternates	$100,000	$40,000	—N/a

- An undefeated champion would earn the maximum 1,500 ranking points and $3,370,000 in singles or $725,000 in doubles.
- Participation fees are prorated according to the number of matches played. In singles, the fees are $150,000 for one match, $180,000 for two matches and $220,000 for three matches. In doubles, the corresponding fees are $60,000, $75,000 and $90,000 per team.
- Alternate fees are also prorated according to the number of matches played. In singles, alternates receive $100,000 for zero matches, $140,000 for one match and $170,000 for two matches. In doubles, the corresponding amounts are $40,000, $55,000 and $70,000 per team.

=== Comparison with ATP Finals ===
The total prize money at the WTA Finals and ATP Finals was equal in both 2024 and 2025. In 2026, the WTA Finals prize fund decreased by 35.48%, while the ATP Finals prize fund increased by 1.61%, resulting in the ATP Finals offering 57.50% more total prize money than the WTA Finals.

Year	WTA Finals	ATP Finals	ATP premium over WTA
2024	$15,250,000	$15,250,000	0.00%
2025	$15,500,000	$15,500,000	0.00%
2026	$10,000,000	$15,750,000	+57.50%

== List of finals ==
=== Singles ===
‡ From 1984 to 1998, the final match in singles was held in a best-of-five-sets format.

Year	Champion	Runner-up	Score
1972	(United States) Chris Evert (1/4)	(Australia) Kerry Melville	7–5, 6–4
1973	(United States) Chris Evert (2/4)	(United States) Nancy Richey Gunter	6–3, 6–3
1974	(Australia) Evonne Goolagong (1/2)	(United States) Chris Evert	6–3, 6–4
1975	(United States) Chris Evert (3/4)	(Czechoslovakia) Martina Navratilova	6–4, 6–2
1976	(Australia) Evonne Goolagong Cawley (2/2)	(United States) Chris Evert	6–3, 5–7, 6–3
1977	(United States) Chris Evert (4/4)	(United Kingdom) Sue Barker	2–6, 6–1, 6–1
1978	(United States) Martina Navratilova (1/8)	(Australia) Evonne Goolagong Cawley	7–6^{(7–2)}, 6–4
1979	(United States) Martina Navratilova (2/8)	(United States) Tracy Austin	6–3, 3–6, 6–2
1980	(United States) Tracy Austin (1/1)	(United States) Martina Navratilova	6–2, 2–6, 6–2
1981	(United States) Martina Navratilova (3/8)	(United States) Andrea Jaeger	6–3, 7–6^{(7–3)}
1982	(Germany) Sylvia Hanika (1/1)	(United States) Martina Navratilova	1–6, 6–3, 6–4
1983	(United States) Martina Navratilova (4/8)	(United States) Chris Evert	6–2, 6–0
1984^{‡}	(United States) Martina Navratilova (5/8)	(United States) Chris Evert	6–3, 7–5, 6–1
1985^{‡}	(United States) Martina Navratilova (6/8)	(Czechoslovakia) Helena Suková	6–3, 7–5, 6–4
1986 (Mar.)^{‡}	(United States) Martina Navratilova (7/8)	(Czechoslovakia) Hana Mandlíková	6–2, 6–0, 3–6, 6–1
1986 (Nov.)^{‡}	(United States) Martina Navratilova (8/8)	(Germany) Steffi Graf	7–6^{(8–6)}, 6–3, 6–2
1987^{‡}	(Germany) Steffi Graf (1/5)	(Argentina) Gabriela Sabatini	4–6, 6–4, 6–0, 6–4
1988^{‡}	(Argentina) Gabriela Sabatini (1/2)	(United States) Pam Shriver	7–5, 6–2, 6–2
1989^{‡}	(Germany) Steffi Graf (2/5)	(United States) Martina Navratilova	6–4, 7–5, 2–6, 6–2
1990^{‡}	(Socialist Federal Republic of Yugoslavia) Monica Seles (1/3)	(Argentina) Gabriela Sabatini	6–4, 5–7, 3–6, 6–4, 6–2
1991^{‡}	(Socialist Federal Republic of Yugoslavia) Monica Seles (2/3)	(United States) Martina Navratilova	6–4, 3–6, 7–5, 6–0
1992^{‡}	(Federal Republic of Yugoslavia) Monica Seles (3/3)	(United States) Martina Navratilova	7–5, 6–3, 6–1
1993^{‡}	(Germany) Steffi Graf (3/5)	(Spain) Arantxa Sánchez Vicario	6–1, 6–4, 3–6, 6–1
1994^{‡}	(Argentina) Gabriela Sabatini (2/2)	(United States) Lindsay Davenport	6–3, 6–2, 6–4
1995^{‡}	(Germany) Steffi Graf (4/5)	(Germany) Anke Huber	6–1, 2–6, 6–1, 4–6, 6–3
1996^{‡}	(Germany) Steffi Graf (5/5)	(Switzerland) Martina Hingis	6–3, 4–6, 6–0, 4–6, 6–0
1997^{‡}	(Czech Republic) Jana Novotná (1/1)	(France) Mary Pierce	7–6^{(7–4)}, 6–2, 6–3
1998^{‡}	(Switzerland) Martina Hingis (1/2)	(United States) Lindsay Davenport	7–5, 6–4, 4–6, 6–2
1999	(United States) Lindsay Davenport (1/1)	(Switzerland) Martina Hingis	6–4, 6–2
2000	(Switzerland) Martina Hingis (2/2)	(United States) Monica Seles	6–7^{(5–7)}, 6–4, 6–4
2001	(United States) Serena Williams (1/5)	(United States) Lindsay Davenport	walkover
2002	(Belgium) Kim Clijsters (1/3)	(United States) Serena Williams	7–5, 6–3
2003	(Belgium) Kim Clijsters (2/3)	(France) Amélie Mauresmo	6–2, 6–0
2004	(Russia) Maria Sharapova (1/1)	(United States) Serena Williams	4–6, 6–2, 6–4
2005	(France) Amélie Mauresmo (1/1)	(France) Mary Pierce	5–7, 7–6^{(7–3)}, 6–4
2006	(Belgium) Justine Henin (1/2)	(France) Amélie Mauresmo	6–4, 6–3
2007	(Belgium) Justine Henin (2/2)	(Russia) Maria Sharapova	5–7, 7–5, 6–3
2008	(United States) Venus Williams (1/1)	(Russia) Vera Zvonareva	6–7^{(5–7)}, 6–0, 6–2
2009	(United States) Serena Williams (2/5)	(United States) Venus Williams	6–2, 7–6^{(7–4)}
2010	(Belgium) Kim Clijsters (3/3)	(Denmark) Caroline Wozniacki	6–3, 5–7, 6–3
2011	(Czech Republic) Petra Kvitová (1/1)	(Belarus) Victoria Azarenka	7–5, 4–6, 6–3
2012	(United States) Serena Williams (3/5)	(Russia) Maria Sharapova	6–4, 6–3
2013	(United States) Serena Williams (4/5)	(China) Li Na	2–6, 6–3, 6–0
2014	(United States) Serena Williams (5/5)	(Romania) Simona Halep	6–3, 6–0
2015	(Poland) Agnieszka Radwańska (1/1)	(Czech Republic) Petra Kvitová	6–2, 4–6, 6–3
2016	(Slovakia) Dominika Cibulková (1/1)	(Germany) Angelique Kerber	6–3, 6–4
2017	(Denmark) Caroline Wozniacki (1/1)	(United States) Venus Williams	6–4, 6–4
2018	(Ukraine) Elina Svitolina (1/1)	(United States) Sloane Stephens	3–6, 6–2, 6–2
2019	(Australia) Ashleigh Barty (1/1)	(Ukraine) Elina Svitolina	6–4, 6–3
2020	No competition due to the COVID-19 pandemic		
2021	(Spain) Garbiñe Muguruza (1/1)	(Estonia) Anett Kontaveit	6–3, 7–5
2022	(France) Caroline Garcia (1/1)	Aryna Sabalenka (Note: On 1 March 2022, the WTA announced that players from Belarus will not be allowed to compete under the name or flag of Belarus following the 2022 Russian invasion of Ukraine. Aryna Sabalenka thus competed as neutral player since then.)	7–6^{(7–4)}, 6–4
2023	(Poland) Iga Świątek (1/1)	(United States) Jessica Pegula	6–1, 6–0
2024	(United States) Coco Gauff (1/1)	(China) Zheng Qinwen	3–6, 6–4, 7–6^{(7–2)}
2025	(Kazakhstan) Elena Rybakina (1/1)	Aryna Sabalenka	6–3, 7–6^{(7–0)}
2026	Mirra Andreeva (Note: On 1 March 2022, the WTA announced that players from Russia will not be allowed to compete under the name or flag of Russia following the 2022 Russian invasion of Ukraine. Mirra Andreeva, Veronika Kudermetova and Vera Zvonareva thus competed as neutral players since then, so Andreeva's one singles title, Kudermetova's two doubles titles and Zvonareva's one doubles title are not attributed to Russia in the "Titles by country" list.) (1/1)	(Ukraine) Elina Svitolina	7–5, 6–3

=== Doubles ===
Year	Champions	Runners-up	Score
1972	No Doubles Played		
1973	(United States) Rosemary Casals (1/2) (Australia) Margaret Court (1/2)	(France) Françoise Dürr (Netherlands) Betty Stöve	6–2, 6–4
1974	(United States) Rosemary Casals (2/2) (United States) Billie Jean King (1/4)	(France) Françoise Dürr (Netherlands) Betty Stöve	6–1, 6–7^{(2–7)}, 7–5
1975	(Australia) Margaret Court (2/2) (United Kingdom) Virginia Wade (1/1)	(United States) Rosemary Casals (United States) Billie Jean King	6–7^{(2–7)}, 7–6^{(7–2)}, 6–2
1976	(United States) Billie Jean King (2/4) (Netherlands) Betty Stöve (1/3)	(United States) Mona Guerrant (United States) Ann Kiyomura	6–3, 6–2
1977	(United States) Martina Navratilova (1/13) (Netherlands) Betty Stöve (2/3)	(France) Françoise Dürr (United Kingdom) Virginia Wade	7–5, 6–3
1978	(United States) Billie Jean King (3/4) (United States) Martina Navratilova (2/13)	(France) Françoise Dürr (United Kingdom) Virginia Wade	6–4, 6–4
1979	(France) Françoise Dürr (1/1) (Netherlands) Betty Stöve (3/3)	(United Kingdom) Sue Barker (United States) Ann Kiyomura	7–6^{(7–1)}, 7–6^{(7–3)}
1980	(United States) Billie Jean King (4/4) (United States) Martina Navratilova (3/13)	(United States) Rosemary Casals (Australia) Wendy Turnbull	6–3, 4–6, 6–3
1981	(United States) Martina Navratilova (4/13) (United States) Pam Shriver (1/10)	(United States) Barbara Potter (United States) Sharon Walsh	6–0, 7–6^{(8–6)}
1982	(United States) Martina Navratilova (5/13) (United States) Pam Shriver (2/10)	(United States) Kathy Jordan (United States) Anne Smith	6–4, 6–3
1983	(United States) Martina Navratilova (6/13) (United States) Pam Shriver (3/10)	(West Germany) Claudia Kohde-Kilsch (West Germany) Eva Pfaff	7–5, 6–2
1984	(United States) Martina Navratilova (7/13) (United States) Pam Shriver (4/10)	(United Kingdom) Jo Durie (United States) Ann Kiyomura	6–3, 6–1
1985	(United States) Martina Navratilova (8/13) (United States) Pam Shriver (5/10)	(West Germany) Claudia Kohde-Kilsch (Czechoslovakia) Helena Suková	6–7^{(4–7)}, 6–4, 7–6^{(7–5)}
1986 (Mar.)	(Czechoslovakia) Hana Mandlíková (1/1) (Australia) Wendy Turnbull (1/1)	(West Germany) Claudia Kohde-Kilsch (Czechoslovakia) Helena Suková	6–4, 6–7^{(4–7)}, 6–3
1986 (Nov.)	(United States) Martina Navratilova (9/13) (United States) Pam Shriver (6/10)	(West Germany) Claudia Kohde-Kilsch (Czechoslovakia) Helena Suková	7–6^{(7–1)}, 6–3
1987	(United States) Martina Navratilova (10/13) (United States) Pam Shriver (7/10)	(West Germany) Claudia Kohde-Kilsch (Czechoslovakia) Helena Suková	6–1, 6–1
1988	(United States) Martina Navratilova (11/13) (United States) Pam Shriver (8/10)	(Soviet Union) Larisa Savchenko (Soviet Union) Natalia Zvereva	6–3, 6–4
1989	(United States) Martina Navratilova (12/13) (United States) Pam Shriver (9/10)	(Soviet Union) Larisa Savchenko (Soviet Union) Natalia Zvereva	6–3, 6–2
1990	(United States) Kathy Jordan (1/1) (Australia) Elizabeth Smylie (1/1)	(Argentina) Mercedes Paz (Spain) Arantxa Sánchez Vicario	7–6^{(7–4)}, 6–4
1991	(United States) Martina Navratilova (13/13) (United States) Pam Shriver (10/10)	(United States) Gigi Fernández (Czechoslovakia) Jana Novotná	4–6, 7–5, 6–4
1992	(Spain) Arantxa Sánchez Vicario (1/2) (Czechoslovakia) Helena Suková (1/1)	(Czechoslovakia) Jana Novotná (Latvia) Larisa Savchenko Neiland	7–6^{(7–4)}, 6–1
1993	(United States) Gigi Fernández (1/2) (Belarus) Natalia Zvereva (1/3)	(Czech Republic) Jana Novotná (Latvia) Larisa Neiland	6–3, 7–5
1994	(United States) Gigi Fernández (2/2) (Belarus) Natasha Zvereva (2/3)	(Czech Republic) Jana Novotná (Spain) Arantxa Sánchez Vicario	6–3, 6–7^{(4–7)}, 6–3
1995	(Czech Republic) Jana Novotná (1/2) (Spain) Arantxa Sánchez Vicario (2/2)	(United States) Gigi Fernández (Belarus) Natasha Zvereva	6–2, 6–1
1996	(United States) Lindsay Davenport (1/3) (United States) Mary Joe Fernández (1/1)	(Czech Republic) Jana Novotná (Spain) Arantxa Sánchez Vicario	6–3, 6–2
1997	(United States) Lindsay Davenport (2/3) (Czech Republic) Jana Novotná (2/2)	(France) Alexandra Fusai (France) Nathalie Tauziat	6–7^{(5–7)}, 6–3, 6–2
1998	(United States) Lindsay Davenport (3/3) (Belarus) Natasha Zvereva (3/3)	(France) Alexandra Fusai (France) Nathalie Tauziat	6–7^{(6–8)}, 7–5, 6–3
1999	(Switzerland) Martina Hingis (1/3) (Russia) Anna Kournikova (1/2)	(Spain) Arantxa Sánchez Vicario (Latvia) Larisa Neiland	6–4, 6–4
2000	(Switzerland) Martina Hingis (2/3) (Russia) Anna Kournikova (2/2)	(United States) Nicole Arendt (Netherlands) Manon Bollegraf	6–2, 6–3
2001	(United States) Lisa Raymond (1/4) (Australia) Rennae Stubbs (1/1)	(Zimbabwe) Cara Black (Russia) Elena Likhovtseva	7–5, 3–6, 6–3
2002	(Russia) Elena Dementieva (1/1) (Slovakia) Janette Husárová (1/1)	(Zimbabwe) Cara Black (Russia) Elena Likhovtseva	4–6, 6–4, 6–3
2003	(Spain) Virginia Ruano Pascual (1/1) (Argentina) Paola Suárez (1/1)	(Belgium) Kim Clijsters (Japan) Ai Sugiyama	6–4, 3–6, 6–3
2004	(Russia) Nadia Petrova (1/2) (United States) Meghann Shaughnessy (1/1)	(Zimbabwe) Cara Black (Australia) Rennae Stubbs	7–5, 6–2
2005	(United States) Lisa Raymond (2/4) (Australia) Samantha Stosur (1/2)	(Zimbabwe) Cara Black (Australia) Rennae Stubbs	6–7^{(5–7)}, 7–5, 6–4
2006	(United States) Lisa Raymond (3/4) (Australia) Samantha Stosur (2/2)	(Zimbabwe) Cara Black (Australia) Rennae Stubbs	3–6, 6–3, 6–3
2007	(Zimbabwe) Cara Black (1/3) (United States) Liezel Huber (1/3)	(Slovenia) Katarina Srebotnik (Japan) Ai Sugiyama	5–7, 6–3, [10–8]
2008	(Zimbabwe) Cara Black (2/3) (United States) Liezel Huber (2/3)	(Czech Republic) Květa Peschke (Australia) Rennae Stubbs	6–1, 7–5
2009	(Spain) Nuria Llagostera Vives (1/1) (Spain) María José Martínez Sánchez (1/1)	(Zimbabwe) Cara Black (United States) Liezel Huber	7–6^{(7–0)}, 5–7, [10–7]
2010	(Argentina) Gisela Dulko (1/1) (Italy) Flavia Pennetta (1/1)	(Czech Republic) Květa Peschke (Slovenia) Katarina Srebotnik	7–5, 6–4
2011	(United States) Liezel Huber (3/3) (United States) Lisa Raymond (4/4)	(Czech Republic) Květa Peschke (Slovenia) Katarina Srebotnik	6–4, 6–4
2012	(Russia) Maria Kirilenko (1/1) (Russia) Nadia Petrova (2/2)	(Czech Republic) Andrea Hlaváčková (Czech Republic) Lucie Hradecká	6–1, 6–4
2013	(Chinese Taipei) Hsieh Su-wei (1/1) (China) Peng Shuai (1/1)	(Russia) Ekaterina Makarova (Russia) Elena Vesnina	6–4, 7–5
2014	(Zimbabwe) Cara Black (3/3) (India) Sania Mirza (1/2)	(Chinese Taipei) Hsieh Su-wei (China) Peng Shuai	6–1, 6–0
2015	(Switzerland) Martina Hingis (3/3) (India) Sania Mirza (2/2)	(Spain) Garbiñe Muguruza (Spain) Carla Suárez Navarro	6–0, 6–3
2016	(Russia) Ekaterina Makarova (1/1) (Russia) Elena Vesnina (1/1)	(United States) Bethanie Mattek-Sands (Czech Republic) Lucie Šafářová	7–6^{(7–5)}, 6–3
2017	(Hungary) Tímea Babos (1/3) (Czech Republic) Andrea Hlaváčková (1/1)	(Netherlands) Kiki Bertens (Sweden) Johanna Larsson	4–6, 6–4, [10–5]
2018	(Hungary) Tímea Babos (2/3) (France) Kristina Mladenovic (1/2)	(Czech Republic) Barbora Krejčíková (Czech Republic) Kateřina Siniaková	6–4, 7–5
2019	(Hungary) Tímea Babos (3/3) (France) Kristina Mladenovic (2/2)	(Chinese Taipei) Hsieh Su-wei (Czech Republic) Barbora Strýcová	6–1, 6–3
2020	No competition due to the COVID-19 pandemic		
2021	(Czech Republic) Barbora Krejčíková (1/1) (Czech Republic) Kateřina Siniaková (1/2)	(Chinese Taipei) Hsieh Su-wei (Belgium) Elise Mertens	6–3, 6–4
2022	Veronika Kudermetova (1/2) (Belgium) Elise Mertens (1/2)	(Czech Republic) Barbora Krejčíková (Czech Republic) Kateřina Siniaková	6–2, 4–6, [11–9]
2023	(Germany) Laura Siegemund (1/1); Vera Zvonareva (1/1)	(United States) Nicole Melichar-Martinez (Australia) Ellen Perez	6–4, 6–4
2024	(Canada) Gabriela Dabrowski (1/1) (New Zealand) Erin Routliffe (1/1)	(Czech Republic) Kateřina Siniaková (United States) Taylor Townsend	7–5, 6–3
2025	Veronika Kudermetova (2/2) (Belgium) Elise Mertens (2/2)	(Hungary) Tímea Babos (Brazil) Luisa Stefani	7–6^{(7–4)}, 6–1
2026	(Czech Republic) Kateřina Siniaková (2/2) (United States) Taylor Townsend (1/1)	(Italy) Sara Errani (Italy) Jasmine Paolini	6–4, 6–3

== List of champions ==
- Current through 2026 WTA Finals (active players in **bold**).

=== Singles ===
Titles	Player	Years
8	(United States) Martina Navratilova	1978–79, 81, 83–86^{(Nov.)} (Note: In 1986 the WTA adopted a January–November playing season, thereby the event switched to being held at the end of each year. Consequently, there were two championships held in 1986. First edition was played in March.) (Note: Second edition was played in November.)
5	(Germany) Steffi Graf	1987, 89, 93, 95–96
5	(United States) Serena Williams	2001, 09, 12–14
4	(United States) Chris Evert	1972–73, 75, 77
3	(Socialist Federal Republic of Yugoslavia) / (Federal Republic of Yugoslavia) Monica Seles	1990–92
3	(Belgium) Kim Clijsters	2002–03, 10
2	(Australia) Evonne Goolagong Cawley	1974, 76
2	(Argentina) Gabriela Sabatini	1988, 94
2	(Switzerland) Martina Hingis	1998, 2000
2	(Belgium) Justine Henin	2006–07
1	(United States) Tracy Austin	1980
1	(West Germany) Sylvia Hanika	1982
1	(Czech Republic) Jana Novotná	1997
1	(United States) Lindsay Davenport	1999
1	(Russia) Maria Sharapova	2004
1	(France) Amélie Mauresmo	2005
1	(United States) **Venus Williams**	2008
1	(Czech Republic) Petra Kvitová	2011
1	(Poland) Agnieszka Radwańska	2015
1	(Slovakia) Dominika Cibulková	2016
1	(Denmark) Caroline Wozniacki	2017
1	(Ukraine) **Elina Svitolina**	2018
1	(Australia) Ashleigh Barty	2019
1	(Spain) Garbiñe Muguruza	2021
1	(France) Caroline Garcia	2022
1	(Poland) **Iga Świątek**	2023
1	(United States) **Coco Gauff**	2024
1	(Kazakhstan) **Elena Rybakina**	2025
1	**Mirra Andreeva** (Note: On 1 March 2022, the WTA announced that players from Russia will not be allowed to compete under the name or flag of Russia following the 2022 Russian invasion of Ukraine. Mirra Andreeva, Veronika Kudermetova and Vera Zvonareva thus competed as neutral players since then, so Andreeva's one singles title, Kudermetova's two doubles titles and Zvonareva's one doubles title are not attributed to Russia in the "Titles by country" list.)	2026

=== Doubles ===
Titles	Player	Years
13	(United States) Martina Navratilova	1977–78, 80–85, 86^{(Nov.)}, 87–89, 91
10	(United States) Pam Shriver	1981–85, 86^{(Nov.)}, 87–89, 91
4	(United States) Billie Jean King	1974, 76, 78, 80
4	(United States) Lisa Raymond	2001, 05–06, 11
3	(Netherlands) Betty Stöve	1976–77, 79
3	(Belarus) / (Belarus) Natasha Zvereva	1993–94, 98
3	(United States) Lindsay Davenport	1996–98
3	(United States) Liezel Huber	2007–08, 11
3	(Zimbabwe) Cara Black	2007–08, 14
3	(Switzerland) Martina Hingis	1999–00, 2015
3	(Hungary) Tímea Babos	2017–19
2	(United States) Rosemary Casals	1973–74
2	(Australia) Margaret Court	1973, 75
2	(United States) Gigi Fernández	1993–94
2	(Spain) Arantxa Sánchez Vicario	1992, 95
2	(Czech Republic) Jana Novotná	1995, 97
2	(Russia) Anna Kournikova	1999–00
2	(Australia) Samantha Stosur	2005–06
2	(Russia) Nadia Petrova	2004, 12
2	(India) Sania Mirza	2014–15
2	(France) **Kristina Mladenovic**	2018–19
2	**Veronika Kudermetova**; (Belgium) **Elise Mertens**	2022, 25
2	(Czech Republic) **Kateřina Siniaková**	2021, 26
1	(United Kingdom) Virginia Wade	1975
1	(France) Françoise Dürr	1979
1	(Australia) Wendy Turnbull; (Czechoslovakia) Hana Mandlíková	1986^{(Mar.)}
1	(United States) Kathy Jordan; (Australia) Elizabeth Smylie	1990
1	(Czechoslovakia) Helena Suková	1992
1	(United States) Mary Joe Fernández	1996
1	(Australia) Rennae Stubbs	2001
1	(Russia) Elena Dementieva; (Slovakia) Janette Husárová	2002
1	(Spain) Virginia Ruano Pascual; (Argentina) Paola Suárez	2003
1	(United States) Meghann Shaughnessy	2004
1	(Spain) Nuria Llagostera Vives; (Spain) María José Martínez Sánchez	2009
1	(Argentina) Gisela Dulko; (Italy) Flavia Pennetta	2010
1	(Russia) Maria Kirilenko	2012
1	(Chinese Taipei) **Hsieh Su-wei**; (China) Peng Shuai	2013
1	(Russia) Ekaterina Makarova; (Russia) Elena Vesnina	2016
1	(Czech Republic) Andrea Hlaváčková	2017
1	(Czech Republic) **Barbora Krejčiková**	2021
1	(Germany) **Laura Siegemund**; **Vera Zvonareva**	2023
1	(Canada) **Gabriela Dabrowski**; (New Zealand) **Erin Routliffe**	2024
1	(United States) **Taylor Townsend**	2026

== Records and statistics ==
Note: Active players indicated in bold.

=== Singles ===
#	Titles
8	(United States) Martina Navratilova
5	(Germany) Steffi Graf
5	(United States) Serena Williams
4	(United States) Chris Evert
3	(Socialist Federal Republic of Yugoslavia) / (Federal Republic of Yugoslavia) Monica Seles
3	(Belgium) Kim Clijsters

#	Finals
14	(Czechoslovakia) / (United States) Martina Navratilova
8	(United States) Chris Evert
7	(United States) Serena Williams
6	(Germany) Steffi Graf
4	(Argentina) Gabriela Sabatini
4	(Socialist Federal Republic of Yugoslavia) / (Federal Republic of Yugoslavia) / (United States) Monica Seles
4	(Switzerland) Martina Hingis
4	(United States) Lindsay Davenport

#	Matches won
60	(Czechoslovakia) / (United States) Martina Navratilova
34	(United States) Chris Evert
31	(Germany) Steffi Graf
29	(United States) Serena Williams
21	(Argentina) Gabriela Sabatini
21	(Russia) Maria Sharapova

#	Editions played
21	(Czechoslovakia) / (United States) Martina Navratilova
13	(United States) Chris Evert
13	(Germany) Steffi Graf
13	(Spain) Arantxa Sánchez Vicario
12	(United States) Zina Garrison
12	(Spain) Conchita Martínez

=== Youngest & oldest champions ===
Singles	Youngest	(Socialist Federal Republic of Yugoslavia) Monica Seles	16 years, 11 months	1990
Singles	Oldest	(United States) Serena Williams	33 years, 1 month	2014
Doubles	Youngest	(Russia) Anna Kournikova	18 years, 5 months	1999
Doubles	Oldest	Vera Zvonareva (Note: On 1 March 2022, the WTA announced that players from Russia will not be allowed to compete under the name or flag of Russia following the 2022 Russian invasion of Ukraine. Mirra Andreeva, Veronika Kudermetova and Vera Zvonareva thus competed as neutral players since then, so Andreeva's one singles title, Kudermetova's two doubles titles and Zvonareva's one doubles title are not attributed to Russia in the "Titles by country" list.)	39 years, 1 month	2023

=== Longest and shortest matches ===
==== Singles ====
Best-of-five-sets system:

Longest match by time played
1990 final, 3 hours and 47 minutes
(Socialist Federal Republic of Yugoslavia) **Monica Seles**	**6**	5	3	**6**	**6**
(Argentina) Gabriela Sabatini	4	**7**	**6**	4	2

Best-of-three-sets system:

Longest match by time played 2012 round robin, 3 hours and 29 minutes: (Poland) **Agnieszka Radwańska** / 6^{6} / **7** / **6**; (Italy) Sara Errani / **7^{8}** / 5 / 4; Longest match by games won 2017 round robin, 37 games: (United States) **Venus Williams** / **7** / 6^{3} / **7**; (Latvia) Jeļena Ostapenko / 5 / **7^{7}** / 5	Shortest match by games won 2007 round robin, 12 games: (Belgium) **Justine Henin** / **6** / **6**; (France) Marion Bartoli / 0 / 0

==== Doubles ====
Longest match by games won 1985 final, 36 games: (United States) **Martina Navratilova** (United States) **Pam Shriver** / 6^{4} / **6** / **7^{7}**; (West Germany) Claudia Kohde-Kilsch (Czechoslovakia) Helena Suková / **7^{7}** / 4 / 6^{5}	Shortest match by games won 2014 final, 13 games: (Zimbabwe) **Cara Black** (India) **Sania Mirza** / **6** / **6**; (Chinese Taipei) Hsieh Su-wei (China) Peng Shuai / 1 / 0

== Year-end championships double & triple ==
Winning three or two out of the four Year-ending championships since its inception in 1972: WTA Championships/Finals, Series-Ending Championships, Grand Slam Cup, WTA Tournament of Champions/Elite Trophy indicated in bold.

=== Double crown ===
Winning the Year-end championships in both singles and doubles in the same year.

No.	Player	Years won
5	(United States) Martina Navratilova	1978, 1983, 1984, 1985, 1986^{(Nov)} (Note: In 1986 the event was held twice because of a change of schedule by the WTA. First edition was played in March, the second in November. Navratilova would go on to win the second edition in both singles and doubles that year.)
1	(Czech Republic) Jana Novotná	1997
1	(Switzerland) Martina Hingis	2000

=== Year-end championships triple ===
No.	Player	WTA Championships/Finals	Grand Slam Cup	WTA Elite Trophy
1	(United States) Venus Williams	2008	1998	**2015**

=== WTA Championships – Series-Ending Championships Double ===
No.	Player	WTA Championships/Finals	Series-Ending Championships
1	(United States) Chris Evert	1972	**1977**
2	(United States) Martina Navratilova	1978	**1979**
3	(United States) Tracy Austin	1980	**1980**

=== WTA Championships – Grand Slam Cup Double ===
No.	Player	WTA Championships/Finals	Grand Slam Cup
1	(United States) Serena Williams	**2001**	1999
2	(United States) Venus Williams (Note: she later completed a YEC Triple.)	**2008**	1998

=== WTA Championships – WTA Elite Trophy Double ===
No.	Player	WTA Championships/Finals	WTA Elite Trophy
1	(United States) Venus Williams (Note: with the 2015 WTA Elite Trophy she also completed a YEC Triple.)	2008	**2015**
2	(Czech Republic) Petra Kvitová	2011	**2016**
3	(Australia) Ashleigh Barty	**2019**	2018

=== Grand Slam Cup – WTA Elite Trophy Double ===
No.	Player	Grand Slam Cup	WTA Elite Trophy
1	(United States) Venus Williams (Note: with the 2015 WTA Elite Trophy she also completed a YEC Triple.)	1998	**2015**

== Titles by country ==
=== Singles ===
21	United States (7 players)

6	West Germany / Germany (2 players)

5	Belgium (2 players)

3	Australia (2 players), Yugoslavia / FR Yugoslavia (1 player)

2	Argentina (1 player), Czech Republic (2 players), France (2 players), Poland (2 players), Switzerland (1 player)

1	Denmark, Kazakhstan, Russia (Note: On 1 March 2022, the WTA announced that players from Russia will not be allowed to compete under the name or flag of Russia following the 2022 Russian invasion of Ukraine. Mirra Andreeva, Veronika Kudermetova and Vera Zvonareva thus competed as neutral players since then, so Andreeva's one singles title, Kudermetova's two doubles titles and Zvonareva's one doubles title are not attributed to Russia in the "Titles by country" list.), Slovakia, Spain, Ukraine

=== Doubles ===
Note: Titles won by a team of players from the same country, count as one title, not two.

30	United States (12 players)

7	Australia (5 players), Czechoslovakia / Czech Republic (6 players)

6	Russia (6 players)

4	Spain (4 players)

3	Belarus (1 player), France (2 players), Hungary (1 player), Netherlands (1 player), Switzerland (1 player), Zimbabwe (1 player)

2	Argentina (2 players), Belgium (1 players), India (1 player)

1	Canada, China, Chinese Taipei, Germany, Great Britain, Italy, New Zealand, Slovakia

== Sponsors ==
The event has a more than 40-year history of corporate sponsorship with the finals named after the sponsoring company.

Years	Sponsor	Name	Refs
1972–1978	Virginia Slims	Virginia Slims Championships	
1979–1982	Avon	Avon Championships	
1983–1994	Virginia Slims	Virginia Slims Championships	
1995	None	WTA Tour Championships	
1996–2000	Chase	Chase Championships	
2001	Sanex	Sanex Championships	
2002	The Home Depot	Home Depot Championships	
2003	Bank of America	Bank of America WTA Tour Championships	
2004	None	WTA Tour Championships	
2005–2010	Sony Ericsson	Sony Ericsson Championships	
2011–2013	BNP Paribas and Türk Ekonomi Bankası	TEB–BNP Paribas WTA Championships Istanbul	
2014–2018	BNP Paribas and SC Global	BNP Paribas WTA Finals Singapore presented by SC Global	
2019	Shiseido	Shiseido WTA Finals Shenzhen	
2021	Akron	Akron WTA Finals Guadalajara	
2022	Hologic	Hologic WTA Finals Fort Worth	
2023	GNP Seguros	GNP Seguros WTA Finals Cancun	

== See also ==
- Toyota Championships
- WTA Finals appearances
- WTA Elite Trophy
- ATP Finals
