= 1992 in tennis =

This page covers all the important events in the sport of tennis in 1992. It provides the results of notable tournaments throughout the year on both the ATP and WTA Tours, the Davis Cup, and the Fed Cup.

== ITF ==
=== Grand Slam events ===
==== Singles ====
	Championship	Champions	Finalists	Score in the final
Men	Australian Open	(United States) Jim Courier	(Sweden) Stefan Edberg	6–3, 3–6, 6–4, 6–2 (Note: It was Courier's 2nd career Grand Slam title and his 1st Australian Open title.)
Men	French Open	(United States) Jim Courier	(Czechoslovakia) Petr Korda	7–5, 6–2, 6–1 (Note: It was Courier's 3rd career Grand Slam singles title and his 2nd and last title at the French Open. It was Courier's 5th title of the year, and his 9th overall.)
Men	Wimbledon	(United States) Andre Agassi	(Croatia) Goran Ivanišević	6–7^{(8–10)}, 6–4, 6–4, 1–6, 6–4 (Note: It was Agassi's 1st career Grand Slam title and only Wimbledon title.)
Men	US Open	(Sweden) Stefan Edberg	(United States) Pete Sampras	3–6, 6–4, 7–6^{(7–5)}, 6–2 (Note: It was Edberg's 6th career Grand Slam title and his 2nd and last US Open title.)
Women	Australian Open	(Socialist Federal Republic of Yugoslavia) Monica Seles	(United States) Mary Joe Fernández	6–2, 6–3 (Note: It was Seles' 5th career Grand Slam title and her 2nd Australian Open title.)
Women	French Open	(Federal Republic of Yugoslavia) Monica Seles	(Germany) Steffi Graf	6–2, 3–6, 10–8 (Note: It was Seles' 6th career Grand Slam singles title and her 3rd and last title at the French Open. It was Monica's 6th title of the year, and her 26th overall.)
Women	Wimbledon	(Germany) Steffi Graf	(Federal Republic of Yugoslavia) Monica Seles	6–2, 6–1 (Note: It was Graf's 11th career Grand Slam title and her 4th Wimbledon title.)
Women	US Open	(Federal Republic of Yugoslavia) Monica Seles	(Spain) Arantxa Sánchez	6–3, 6–3 (Note: It was Seles' 7th career Grand Slam title and her 2nd and last US Open title.)

==== Doubles ====
	Championship	Champions	Finalists	Score in the final
Men	Australian Open	(Australia) Todd Woodbridge (Australia) Mark Woodforde	(United States) Kelly Jones (United States) Rick Leach	6–4, 6–3, 6–4 (Note: It was Woodbridge's 2nd career Grand Slam title and his 1st Australian Open title. It was Woodforde's 2nd career Grand Slam title and his 1st Australian Open title.)
Men	French Open	(Switzerland) Jakob Hlasek (Switzerland) Marc Rosset	(South Africa) David Adams (Commonwealth of Independent States) Andrei Olhovskiy	7–6^{(7–4)}, 6–7^{(3–7)}, 7–5 (Note: It was Hlasek's 1st and only career Grand Slam doubles title.) (Note: It was Rosset's 1st and only career Grand Slam doubles title.)
Men	Wimbledon	(United States) John McEnroe (Germany) Michael Stich	(United States) Jim Grabb (United States) Richey Reneberg	5–7, 7–6^{(7–5)}, 3–6, 7–6^{(7–5)}, 19–17 (Note: It was McEnroe's 17th and last career Grand Slam title and his 8th Wimbledon title. It was Stich's 2nd and last career Grand Slam title and his 2nd Wimbledon title.)
Men	US Open	(United States) Jim Grabb (United States) Richey Reneberg	(United States) Kelly Jones (United States) Rick Leach	3–6, 7–6^{(7–2)}, 6–3, 6–3 (Note: It was Grabb's 2nd and last career Grand Slam title and his only US Open title. It was Reneberg's 1st career Grand Slam title and his only US Open title.)
Women	Australian Open	(Spain) Arantxa Sánchez (Czechoslovakia) Helena Suková	(United States) Mary Joe Fernández (United States) Zina Garrison	6–4, 7–6^{(7–2)} (Note: It was Sánchez Vicario's 3rd career Grand Slam title and her 1st Australian Open title. It was Suková's 8th career Grand Slam title and her 2nd Australian Open title.)
Women	French Open	(United States) Gigi Fernández (Commonwealth of Independent States) Natalia Zvereva	(Spain) Conchita Martínez (Spain) Arantxa Sánchez	6–3, 6–2
Women	Wimbledon	(United States) Gigi Fernández (Commonwealth of Independent States) Natasha Zvereva	(Latvia) Larisa Neiland (Czechoslovakia) Jana Novotná	6–4, 6–1 (Note: It was Fernández's 5th career Grand Slam title and her 1st Wimbledon title. It was Zvereva's 6th career Grand Slam title and her 2nd Wimbledon title.)
Women	US Open	(United States) Gigi Fernández (Commonwealth of Independent States) Natasha Zvereva	(Latvia) Larisa Neiland (Czechoslovakia) Jana Novotná	7–6^{(7–4)}, 6–1 (Note: It was Fernández's 6th career Grand Slam title and her 3rd US Open title. It was Zvereva's 7th career Grand Slam title and her 2nd US Open title.)
Mixed	Australian Open	(Australia) Nicole Bradtke (Australia) Mark Woodforde	(Spain) Arantxa Sánchez (Australia) Todd Woodbridge	6–3, 4–6, 11–9 (Note: It was Provis' 1st career Grand Slam title and her only Australian Open title. It was Woodforde's 3rd career Grand Slam title and his 2nd Australian Open title.)
Mixed	French Open	(Spain) Arantxa Sánchez (Australia) Todd Woodbridge	(United States) Lori McNeil (United States) Bryan Shelton	6–2, 6–3 (Note: It was Sánchez Vicario's 2nd career Grand Slam mixed doubles title and her 2nd and last title at the French Open.) (Note: It was Woodbridge's 2nd career Grand Slam mixed doubles title and his 1st title at the French Open.)
Mixed	Wimbledon	(Latvia) Larisa Neiland (Czechoslovakia) Cyril Suk	(Netherlands) Jacco Eltingh (Netherlands) Miriam Oremans	7–6^{(7–2)}, 6–2 (Note: It was Suk's 2nd career Grand Slam title and his 1st Wimbledon title. It was Neiland's 3rd career Grand Slam title and her 2nd Wimbledon title.)
Mixed	US Open	(Australia) Nicole Bradtke (Australia) Mark Woodforde	(Netherlands) Tom Nijssen (Czechoslovakia) Helena Suková	4–6, 6–3, 6–3 (Note: It was Provis' 2nd and last career Grand Slam title and her only US Open title. It was Woodforde's 5th career Grand Slam title and his 2nd US Open title.)

=== Davis Cup ===
1992 champions
(United States)
United States
30th title

United States
3
Tarrant County Convention Center, Fort Worth, United States
4–6 December
Hard (indoors)

Switzerland
1

			1	2	3	4	5
1	(United States) (Switzerland)	Andre Agassi; Jakob Hlasek	6; 1	6; 2	6; 2
2	(United States) (Switzerland)	Jim Courier; Marc Rosset	3; 6	7^{11} 6^{9}	6; 3	4; 6	4; 6
3	(United States) (Switzerland)	John McEnroe / Pete Sampras; Jakob Hlasek / Marc Rosset	6^{5} 7^{7}	6^{7} 7^{9}	7; 5	6; 1	6; 2
4	(United States) (Switzerland)	Jim Courier; Jakob Hlasek	6; 3	3; 6	6; 3	6; 4
5	(United States) (Switzerland)	Andre Agassi; Marc Rosset						not played

=== Federation Cup ===
1992 champions
(Germany)
Germany
2nd title

Spain
1
Waldstadion T.C., Frankfurt, Germany
19 July
Clay (outdoors)

Germany
2

			1	2	3
1	(Spain) (Germany)	Conchita Martínez; Anke Huber	3; 6	7^{7} 6^{0}	1; 6
2	(Spain) (Germany)	Arantxa Sánchez Vicario; Steffi Graf	4; 6	2; 6
3	(Spain) (Germany)	Conchita Martínez / Arantxa Sánchez Vicario; Anke Huber / Barbara Rittner	6; 1	6; 2

=== Hopman Cup ===
1992 champions
(Switzerland)
Switzerland
1st title

Switzerland
2
Burswood Entertainment Complex, Perth, Australia
27 December 1991 – 3 January 1992
Hard (indoor)

Czechoslovakia
1

			1	2	3
1	(Switzerland) (Czechoslovakia)	Manuela Maleeva-Fragnière; Helena Suková	6; 2	6; 4
2	(Switzerland) (Czechoslovakia)	Jakob Hlasek; Karel Nováček	6; 4	6; 4
3	(Switzerland) (Czechoslovakia)	Manuela Maleeva-Fragnière / Jakob Hlasek; Helena Suková / Karel Nováček	4; 8

=== Summer Olympics ===
==== Singles ====
	Championship	Gold medalists	Silver medalists	Bronze medalists
Men	Barcelona	(Switzerland) Marc Rosset	(Spain) Jordi Arrese	(Croatia) Goran Ivanišević
Men	Barcelona	(Switzerland) Marc Rosset	(Spain) Jordi Arrese	(Unified Team at the Olympics) ( (Russia) ) Andrei Cherkasov
Women	Barcelona	(United States) Jennifer Capriati	(Germany) Steffi Graf	(United States) Mary Joe Fernández
Women	Barcelona	(United States) Jennifer Capriati	(Germany) Steffi Graf	(Spain) Arantxa Sánchez

==== Doubles ====
	Championship	Gold medalists	Silver medalists	Bronze medalists
Men	Barcelona	(Germany) Boris Becker (Germany) Michael Stich	(South Africa) Wayne Ferreira (South Africa) Piet Norval	(Croatia) Goran Ivanišević (Croatia) Goran Prpić
Men	Barcelona	(Germany) Boris Becker (Germany) Michael Stich	(South Africa) Wayne Ferreira (South Africa) Piet Norval	(Argentina) Javier Frana (Argentina) Christian Miniussi
Women	Barcelona	(United States) Gigi Fernández (United States) Mary Joe Fernández	(Spain) Conchita Martínez (Spain) Arantxa Sánchez	(Unified Team at the Olympics) ( (Georgia (country)) ) Leila Meskhi (Unified Team at the Olympics) ( (Belarus) ) Natasha Zvereva
Women	Barcelona	(United States) Gigi Fernández (United States) Mary Joe Fernández	(Spain) Conchita Martínez (Spain) Arantxa Sánchez	(Australia) Nicole Bradtke (Australia) Rachel McQuillan

=== ITF tour ===
- Men's circuit
- Women's circuit

== ATP / WTA ==
- ATP calendar
- WTA calendar

=== Year-end Championships ===
==== Singles ====
	Championship	Champions	Finalists	Score in the final
Men	Frankfurt	(Germany) Boris Becker	(United States) Jim Courier	6–4, 6–3, 7–5
Women	New York	(Federal Republic of Yugoslavia) Monica Seles	(United States) Martina Navratilova	7–5, 6–3, 6–1

==== Doubles ====
	Championship	Champions	Finalists	Score in the final
Men	Johannesburg	(Australia) Todd Woodbridge (Australia) Mark Woodforde	(Australia) John Fitzgerald (Sweden) Anders Järryd	6–2, 7–6^{(7–4)}, 5–7, 3–6, 6–3
Women	New York	(Spain) Arantxa Sánchez (Czechoslovakia) Helena Suková	(Czech Republic) Jana Novotná (Latvia) Larisa Savčenko-Neiland	7–6^{(7–4)}, 6–1

=== Grand Slam Cup ===
==== Singles ====
	Championship	Champions	Finalists	Score in the final
Men	Munich	(Germany) Michael Stich	(United States) Michael Chang	6–2, 6–3, 6–2
