= 1978 Virginia Slims Championships – Singles =

Singles
- 1978 Virginia Slims Championships

Final
- Champion: (Czechoslovakia) Martina Navratilova
- Runner-up: (Australia) Evonne Goolagong Cawley
- Score: 7–6^{(7–5)}, 6–4

Details
- Draw: 8
- Seeds: 8

Events
| Singles | Doubles |
| ← 1977 · | Virginia Slims Championships | · 1979 → |

Martina Navratilova defeated Evonne Goolagong Cawley in the final, 7–6, 6–4 to win the singles tennis title at the 1978 Virginia Slims Championships. It was her first Tour Finals singles title, and the first of an eventual record eight such titles.

Chris Evert was the reigning champion, but did not qualify this year.

== Seeds ==
1. (United States) Martina Navratilova (champion)
2. (Australia) Evonne Goolagong Cawley (final)
3. (Netherlands) Betty Stöve (round robin)
4. (United Kingdom) Virginia Wade (round robin)
5. (United States) Billie Jean King (round robin)
6. (Australia) Wendy Turnbull (third place)
7. (United States) Rosemary Casals (fourth place)
8. (Australia) Kerry Reid (round robin)

== Draw ==
=== Key ===
- Q = Qualifier
- WC = Wild card
- LL = Lucky loser
- Alt = Alternate
- ITF = ITF entry
- PR = Protected ranking
- SR = Special ranking
- SE = Special exempt
- JE = Junior exempt
- JR = Junior Accelerator Programme entrant
- CO = College Accelerator Programme entrant
- NG = Next Gen Accelerator Program entrant
- w/o = Walkover
- r = Retired
- d = Defaulted

=== Finals ===
| Final |
| 1 | (United States) Martina Navratilova | 7^{7} | 6 |
| 2 | (Australia) Evonne Goolagong Cawley | 6^{5} | 4 |

| Third place play-off |
| 6 | (Australia) Wendy Turnbull | 7 | 6 |
| 7 | (United States) Rosemary Casals | 6 | 3 |

=== Round robin ===
==== Gold group ====
| | Gold Group | (United States) Navratilova | (Netherlands) Stöve | (Australia) Turnbull | (Australia) Reid | RR W–L | Set W–L | Game W–L | Standings |
| 1 | (United States) Martina Navratilova | | 6–2, 6–3 | 6–2, 6–1 | 6–2, 6–3 | 3–0 | 6–0 (100%) | 36–13 (73.5%) | 1st place, gold medalist(s) |
| 3 | (Netherlands) Betty Stöve | 2–6, 3–6 | | 4–6, 3–6 | 7–6, 7–6 | 1–2 | 2–4 (33.3%) | 26–36 (42.0%) | 3 |
| 6 | (Australia) Wendy Turnbull | 2–6, 1–6 | 6–4, 6–3 | | 7–6, 6–1 | 2–1 | 4–2 (66.7%) | 28–26 (51.9%) | 2nd place, silver medalist(s) |
| 8 | (Australia) Kerry Reid | 2–6, 3–6 | 6–7, 6–7 | 6–7, 1–6 | | 0–3 | 0–6 (0.0%) | 24–39 (38.1%) | 4 |

==== Orange group ====
| | Orange Group | (Australia) Goolagong Cawley | (United Kingdom) Wade | (United States) King | (United States) Casals | RR W–L | Set W–L | Game W–L | Standings |
| 2 | (Australia) E. Goolagong Cawley | | 6–0, 7–6 | w/o | 7–6, 6–4 | 3–0 | 4–0 (100%) | 20–16 (55.5%) | 1st place, gold medalist(s) |
| 4 | (United Kingdom) Virginia Wade | 0–6, 6–7 | | 1–6, 6–2, 6–4 | 5–7, 6–3, 0–6 | 1–2 | 3–5 (37.5%) | 30–41 (42.3%) | 3 |
| 5 | (United States) Billie Jean King | w/o | 6–1, 2–6, 4–6 | | w/o | 0–3 | 1–2 (33.3%) | 12–13 (48.0%) | 4 |
| 7 | (United States) Rosemary Casals | 6–7, 4–6 | 7–5, 3–6, 6–0 | w/o | | 2–1 | 2–3 (40.0%) | 26–24 (52.0%) | 2nd place, silver medalist(s) |

== See also ==
- WTA Tour Championships appearances
