= 1991 Virginia Slims Championships – Singles =

Singles
- 1991 Virginia Slims Championships

Final
- Champion: (Socialist Federal Republic of Yugoslavia) Monica Seles
- Runner-up: (United States) Martina Navratilova
- Score: 6–4, 3–6, 7–5, 6–0

Details
- Draw: 16
- Seeds: 8

Events
Singles	Doubles
← 1990 ·	Virginia Slims Championships	· 1992 →

Defending champion Monica Seles successfully defended her title, defeating Martina Navratilova in the final, 6–4, 3–6, 7–5, 6–0 to win the singles tennis title at the 1991 Virginia Slims Championships.

== Seeds ==
1. (Socialist Federal Republic of Yugoslavia) Monica Seles (champion)
2. (Germany) Steffi Graf (quarterfinals)
3. (Argentina) Gabriela Sabatini (semifinals)
4. (United States) Martina Navratilova (final)
5. (Spain) Arantxa Sanchez Vicario (quarterfinals)
6. (United States) Jennifer Capriati (quarterfinals)
7. (United States) Mary Joe Fernandez (quarterfinals)
8. (Czechoslovakia) Jana Novotná (semifinals)

== Draw ==
=== Key ===
- Q = Qualifier
- WC = Wild card
- LL = Lucky loser
- Alt = Alternate
- ITF = ITF entry
- PR = Protected ranking
- SR = Special ranking
- SE = Special exempt
- JE = Junior exempt
- JR = Junior Accelerator Programme entrant
- CO = College Accelerator Programme entrant
- NG = Next Gen Accelerator Program entrant
- w/o = Walkover
- r = Retired
- d = Defaulted
- NB: The Final was the best of 5 sets while all other rounds were the best of 3 sets.

First round
1	(Socialist Federal Republic of Yugoslavia) Monica Seles	6	6
(France) Julie Halard-Decugis	1	0
(Czechoslovakia) Helena Suková	6	6^{4}	2^{r}
7	(United States) Mary Joe Fernandez	2	7^{7}	2
3	(Argentina) Gabriela Sabatini	6	7^{7}
(Bulgaria) Katerina Maleeva	2	6^{5}
(France) Nathalie Tauziat	7	0	6^{4}
6	(United States) Jennifer Capriati	5	6	7^{7}
5	(Spain) Arantxa Sanchez Vicario	4	6	6
(United States) Zina Garrison Jackson	6	1	0
(United States) Lori McNeil	4	5
4	(United States) Martina Navratilova	6	7
8	(Czech Republic) Jana Novotná	6	3	6
(Switzerland) Manuela Maleeva-Fragnière	0	6	3
(Spain) Conchita Martínez	0	3
2	(Germany) Steffi Graf	6	6

Quarterfinals
1	(Socialist Federal Republic of Yugoslavia) Monica Seles	6	6
7	(United States) Mary Joe Fernandez	3	2
3	(Argentina) Gabriela Sabatini	6	6
6	(United States) Jennifer Capriati	1	4
5	(Spain) Arantxa Sanchez Vicario	6	4	2
4	(United States) Martina Navratilova	1	6	6
8	(Czech Republic) Jana Novotná	6	3	6
2	(Germany) Steffi Graf	3	6	1

Semifinals
1	(Socialist Federal Republic of Yugoslavia) Monica Seles	6	6
3	(Argentina) Gabriela Sabatini	1	1
4	(United States) Martina Navratilova	6	6
8	(Czech Republic) Jana Novotná	1	4

Final
1	(Socialist Federal Republic of Yugoslavia) Monica Seles	6	3	7	6
4	(United States) Martina Navratilova	4	6	5	0
