= 1991 Virginia Slims Championships – Doubles =

Doubles
- 1991 Virginia Slims Championships

Final
- Champions: (United States) Martina Navratilova (United States) Pam Shriver
- Runners-up: (United States) Gigi Fernández (Czechoslovakia) Jana Novotná
- Score: 4–6, 7–5, 6–4

Details
- Draw: 8
- Seeds: 4

Events
| Singles | Doubles |
| ← 1990 · | Virginia Slims Championships | · 1992 → |

Martina Navratilova and Pam Shriver defeated Gigi Fernández and Jana Novotná in the final, 4–6, 7–5, 6–4 to win the doubles tennis title at the 1991 Virginia Slims Championships. It was Navratilova's 13th and last Tour Finals doubles title, and Shriver's tenth and last.

Kathy Jordan and Elizabeth Smylie were the reigning champions, but Jordan did not qualify this year; Smylie partnered Nicole Provis, but was defeated in the quarterfinals by Fernández and Novotná.

== Seeds ==
1. (United States) Gigi Fernández / (Czechoslovakia) Jana Novotná (final)
2. (Soviet Union) Larisa Savchenko / (Soviet Union) Natasha Zvereva (quarterfinals)
3. (Spain) Arantxa Sánchez Vicario / (Czechoslovakia) Helena Suková (semifinals)
4. (United States) Mary Joe Fernández / (United States) Zina Garrison (semifinals)

== Draw ==
=== Key ===
- Q = Qualifier
- WC = Wild card
- LL = Lucky loser
- Alt = Alternate
- SE = Special exempt
- PR = Protected ranking
- ITF = ITF entry
- JE = Junior exempt
- w/o = Walkover
- r = Retired
- d = Defaulted
- SR = Special ranking

=== Draw ===
Quarterfinals
1 | (United States) Gigi Fernández (Czechoslovakia) Jana Novotná | 6 | 6
(Australia) Nicole Provis (Australia) Elizabeth Smylie | 3 | 4
4 | (United States) Mary Joe Fernández (United States) Zina Garrison | 6 | 6
(United States) Gretchen Rush (United States) Robin White | 3 | 2
(Canada) Jill Hetherington (United States) Kathy Rinaldi | 3 | 7 | 0^{r}
3 | (Spain) Arantxa Sánchez Vicario (Czechoslovakia) Helena Suková | 6 | 5 | 2
(United States) Martina Navratilova (United States) Pam Shriver | 6 | 7
2 | (Soviet Union) Larisa Savchenko (Soviet Union) Natasha Zvereva | 1 | 5

Semifinals
1 | (United States) Gigi Fernández (Czechoslovakia) Jana Novotná | 6 | 3 | 6
4 | (United States) Mary Joe Fernández (United States) Zina Garrison | 3 | 6 | 1
3 | (Spain) Arantxa Sánchez Vicario (Czechoslovakia) Helena Suková | 4 | 2
(United States) Martina Navratilova (United States) Pam Shriver | 6 | 6

Final
1 | (United States) Gigi Fernández (Czechoslovakia) Jana Novotná | 6 | 5 | 4
(United States) Martina Navratilova (United States) Pam Shriver | 4 | 7 | 6
