= 1977 Colgate Series Championships =

- Date: November 1–6
- Edition: 1st
- Category: Virginia Slims circuit
- Draw: 8S / 4D
- Prize money: $250,000
- Surface: Hard / outdoor
- Location: Palm Springs, California, U.S.
- Venue: Mission Hills Country Club

Champions

Singles
- (United States) Chris Evert

Doubles
- (France) Françoise Dürr (United Kingdom) Virginia Wade
Toyota Championships	· 1978 →

The 1977 Colgate Series Championships was a women's tennis tournament played on outdoor hard courts at the Mission Hills Country Club in Palm Springs, California in the United States that was the season-ending tournament of the 1977 Virginia Slims World Championship Series. It was the inaugural edition of the tournament and was held from November 1 through November 6, 1977. The top eight singles players and top four doubles teams, in terms of Colgate Series ranking points, qualified for the event. First-seeded Chris Evert won the singles title and earned $75,000 first-prize money. With a total prize money of $250,000 it was the richest women's tournament to date.

== Finals ==
=== Singles ===
(United States) Chris Evert defeated (United States) Billie Jean King 6–2, 6–2

- It was Evert's 11th singles title of the year and the 78th of her career.

=== Doubles ===
(France) Françoise Dürr / (United Kingdom) Virginia Wade defeated (Australia) Helen Gourlay Cawley / (United States) Joanne Russell 6–1, 4–6, 6–4

== Prize money ==
Event	W	F	3rd	4th	5th	6th	7th	8th
Singles	$75,000	$40,000	$20,000	$15,000	$9,000	$9,000	$9,000	$9,000
Doubles	$30,000	$16,000	$10,000	$7,000	NA	NA	NA	NA

Doubles prize money is per team.

== See also ==
- 1977 Virginia Slims Championships
- 1977 Bridgestone Doubles Championships
