= Virginia Wade =

British tennis player

Virginia Wade CBE
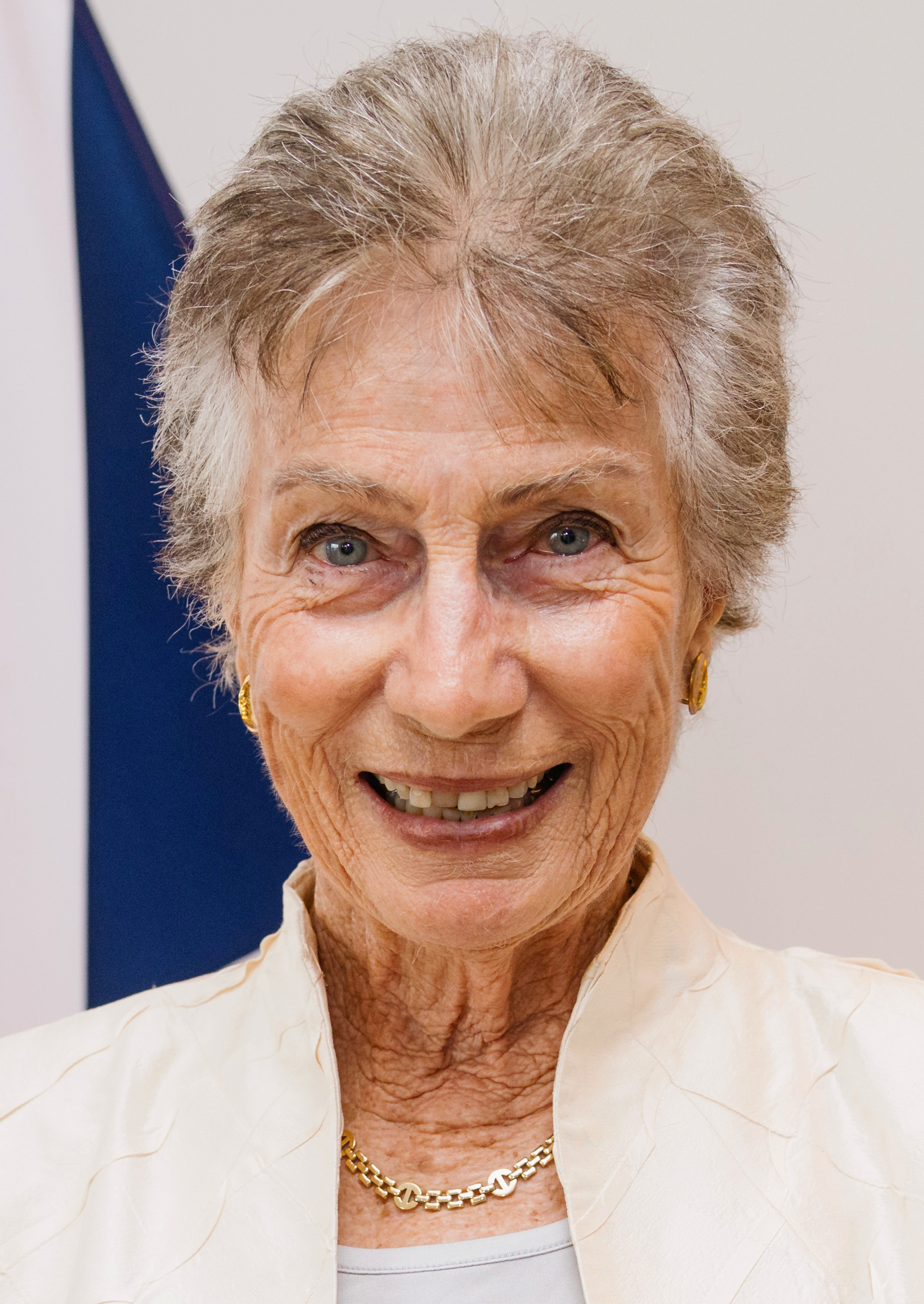
- Wade in 2026
- Full name: Sarah Virginia Wade
- Country (sports): United Kingdom
- Born: 10 July 1945 (age 81) Bournemouth, Dorset, England
- Height: 5 ft 7 in (1.70 m)
- Turned pro: 1968 (amateur from 1962)
- Retired: 1986
- Plays: Right-handed (one-handed backhand)
- Prize money: $1,542,278
- Int. Tennis HoF: 1989 (member page)

Singles
- Career record: 839–329
- Career titles: 55
- Highest ranking: No. 2 (3 November 1975)

Grand Slam singles results
- Australian Open: W (1972)
- French Open: QF (1970, 1972)
- Wimbledon: W (1977)
- US Open: W (1968)

Doubles
- Career record: 42–48
- Highest ranking: No. 1 (1973)

Grand Slam doubles results
- Australian Open: W (1973)
- French Open: W (1973)
- Wimbledon: F (1970)
- US Open: W (1973, 1975)

Other doubles tournaments
- Tour Finals: W (1975)

Grand Slam mixed doubles results
- French Open: SF (1969, 1972)
- Wimbledon: QF (1981)
- US Open: QF (1969, 1985)

Sarah Virginia Wade (born 10 July 1945) is a British former professional tennis player. She won three major tennis singles championships and four major doubles championships, and is the only British woman in history to have won titles at all four majors. She was ranked as high as No. 2 in the world in singles, and No. 1 in the world in doubles.

Wade was the most recent British tennis player to win a major singles tournament until Andy Murray won the 2012 US Open, and was the most recent British woman to have won a major singles title until Emma Raducanu won the 2021 US Open. After retiring from competitive tennis, she coached for four years, and has also worked as a tennis commentator and game analyst for the BBC and Eurosport, and (in the US) for CBS.

== Early life ==
Wade was born in Bournemouth, England, on 10 July 1945. Her father, a Church of England clergyman, was the archdeacon of Durban.

At one year old, Wade moved to South Africa with her parents. There, she learned how to play tennis. When she was aged 15, the family moved back to England, and she went to Tunbridge Wells Girls' Grammar School and Talbot Heath School, Bournemouth. In 1961, she was on the tennis team of Wimbledon County Girls' Grammar School. She studied mathematics and physics at the University of Sussex, graduating in 1966.

== Tennis career ==
Wade's tennis career spanned the end of the amateur era and the start of the Open Era. In April 1968, as an amateur, she won the inaugural open tennis competition – the British Hard Court Championships at Bournemouth. She turned down the £300 first prize, choosing to play for expenses only. Five months later, after turning professional, she won the women's singles championship at the first US Open (and prize-money of $6,000 - $55,550 today), defeating Billie Jean King in the final. Her second Major tennis singles championship came in 1972 at the Australian Open when she defeated Australian Evonne Goolagong in the final in two sets. She was appointed Member of the Order of the British Empire (MBE) in the 1973 Birthday Honours for services to lawn tennis.

Wade won Wimbledon in 1977. It was the 16th year in which she had played at Wimbledon, and she secured her first appearance in the final by beating the defending champion and top-seed Chris Evert in the semifinal in three sets. In the final, she beat seventh-seeded Betty Stöve in three sets to claim the championship, nine days before her 32nd birthday. 1977 was the 100th anniversary of the founding of the Wimbledon Championships as well as the Silver Jubilee year of Elizabeth II, who attended the final for the first time since 1962.

Wade also won four Major women's doubles championships with Margaret Smith Court – two of them at the US Open tennis tournament, one at the Australian Open, and one at the French Open. In 1983, at the age of 37, she won the Italian Open women's doubles championship with Virginia Ruzici of Romania.

Over her career, Wade won 55 professional singles championships and amassed $1,542,278 in career prize money. She was ranked in the world's top 10 continuously from 1967 to 1979. Her career spanned a total of 26 years. She retired from singles competition at the end of the 1985 tennis season, and then from doubles at the end of 1986. She played at Wimbledon on 26 occasions, an all-time record; 24 of those times were in the women's singles.

== After tennis ==
Since 1981, while she was still playing, Wade has been a reporter on tennis events for the BBC. In 1982, she became the first woman to be elected to the Wimbledon Committee.

Wade was appointed Officer of the Order of the British Empire (OBE) in the 1986 Birthday Honours for services to lawn tennis and Commander of the Order of the British Empire (CBE) in the 2025 Birthday Honours for services to tennis and to charity.

In 1989, Wade was inducted into the International Tennis Hall of Fame in Newport, Rhode Island.

== Significant finals ==
=== Grand Slam finals ===
==== Singles: 3 (3 titles) ====
Result	Year	Championship	Surface	Opponent	Score
Win	1968	US Open	Grass	(United States) Billie Jean King	6–4, 6–2
Win	1972	Australian Open	Grass	(Australia) Evonne Goolagong	6–4, 6–4
Win	1977	Wimbledon	Grass	(Netherlands) Betty Stöve	4–6, 6–3, 6–1

==== Doubles: 10 (4 titles, 6 runner-ups) ====
Result	Year	Championship	Surface	Partner	Opponents	Score
Loss	1969	US Open	Grass	(Australia) Margaret Court	(France) Françoise Dürr (United States) Darlene Hard	6–0, 3–6, 4–6
Loss	1970	Wimbledon	Grass	(France) Françoise Dürr	(United States) Rosie Casals (United States) Billie Jean King	2–6, 3–6
Loss	1970	US Open	Grass	(United States) Rosie Casals	(Australia) Margaret Court (Australia) Judy Tegart Dalton	3–6, 4–6
Loss	1972	US Open	Grass	(Australia) Margaret Court	(France) Françoise Dürr (Netherlands) Betty Stöve	3–6, 6–1, 3–6
Win	1973	Australian Open	Grass	(Australia) Margaret Court	(Australia) Kerry Harris (Australia) Kerry Melville	6–4, 6–4
Win	1973	French Open	Clay	(Australia) Margaret Court	(France) Françoise Dürr (Netherlands) Betty Stöve	6–2, 6–3
Win	1973	US Open	Grass	(Australia) Margaret Court	(United States) Rosie Casals (United States) Billie Jean King	2–6, 6–3, 7–5
Win	1975	US Open	Clay	(Australia) Margaret Court	(United States) Rosie Casals (United States) Billie Jean King	7–5, 2–6, 7–6^{(7–5)}
Loss	1976	US Open	Clay	(Soviet Union) Olga Morozova	(South Africa) Linky Boshoff (South Africa) Ilana Kloss	1–6, 4–6
Loss	1979	French Open	Clay	(France) Françoise Dürr	(Netherlands) Betty Stöve (Australia) Wendy Turnbull	6–3, 5–7, 4–6

=== Year-end championships finals ===
==== Doubles: 2 (1 title, 1 runner–up) ====
Result	Year	Location	Surface	Partner	Opponents	Score
Win	1975	Osaka/Tokyo	Carpet (i)	(Australia) Margaret Court	(United States) Rosie Casals (United States) Billie Jean King	6–7^{(2–7)}, 7–6^{(7–2)}, 6–2
Loss	1977	New York	Carpet (i)	(France) Françoise Dürr	(Czechoslovakia) Martina Navratilova (Netherlands) Betty Stöve	5–7, 3–6

== Career finals ==
=== Singles titles (78) ===
Bold type indicates a Grand Slam championship

- 1967 – Connaught, Bournemouth
- 1968 – **US Open**, Bloemfontein, Bournemouth, East London, Dewar Cup London
- 1969 – Cape Town, Hoylake, Dewar Cup Perth, Dewar Cup Stalybridge, Dewar Cup Aberavon, Dewar-Crystal Palace, East London
- 1970 – German Indoors, West Berlin Open, Irish Open, Stalybridge, Aberavon
- 1971 – Cape Town, Catania International Open, Rome, Newport-Wales, Cincinnati, Dewar Cup Billingham, Dewar-Aberavon, Dewar Cup Final-London, Clean Air Classic
- 1972 – **Australian Open**, VS Indoors-Mass., Merion, Buenos Aires
- 1973 – Dallas, Bournemouth, Dewar-Aberavon, Dewar Cup Edinburgh, Dewar-Billingham, Dewar Cup Final-Albert Hall
- 1974 – VS Chicago, Bournemouth, VS Phoenix, Dewar-Edinburgh, Dewar Cup-London
- 1975 – VS Dallas, VS Philadelphia, Paris Indoors, Eastbourne, Dewar Cup, Stockholm
- 1976 – US Indoor Championships, Dewar Cup
- 1977 – **Wimbledon**, World Invitational Hilton Head, Tokyo Sillook
- 1978 – Mahwah, Tokyo Sillook, Florida Open

(Source: WTA)

=== Doubles ===
incomplete list

Result	Date	Tournament	Surface	Partner	Opponents	Score
Win	May 1968	Rome, Italy	Clay	(Australia) Margaret Court	(South Africa) Pat Walkden (South Africa) Annette Van Zyl	6–2, 7–5
Win	Jun 1968	Manchester, UK	Grass	(Australia) Margaret Court	(United States) Betty Rosenquest Pratt (Australia) Judy Tegart	6–3, 6–4
Win	Jul 1968	Hoylake, UK	Grass	(Australia) Margaret Court	(Australia) Lesley Turner Bowrey (South Africa) Pat Walkden	8–6, 6–2
Loss	Sep 1969	US Open	Grass	(Australia) Margaret Court	(France) Françoise Dürr (United States) Darlene Hard	6–0, 3–6, 4–6
Loss	Apr 1970	Rome, Italy	Clay	(France) Françoise Dürr	(United States) Billie Jean King (United States) Rosie Casals	2–6, 6–3, 7–9
Loss	Jul 1970	Wimbledon	Grass	(France) Françoise Dürr	(United States) Rosie Casals (United States) Billie Jean King	2–6, 3–6
Loss	Sep 1970	US Open	Grass	(United States) Rosie Casals	(Australia) Margaret Court (Australia) Judy Tegart Dalton	3–6, 4–6
Loss	Jan 1971	Perth, Australia	Grass	(United Kingdom) Winnie Shaw	(Australia) Margaret Court (Australia) Evonne Goolagong	4–6, 5–7
Win	May 1971	Rome, Italy	Clay	(West Germany) Helga Masthoff	(Australia) Lesley Turner Bowrey (Australia) Helen Gourlay	5–7, 6–2, 6–2
Win	Oct 1971	Billingham, UK	Hard (i)	(France) Françoise Dürr	(Australia) Evonne Goolagong (United States) Julie Heldman	6–3, 4–6, 6–2
Win	Oct 1971	London, UK	Hard (i)	(France) Françoise Dürr	(Australia) Evonne Goolagong (United States) Julie Heldman	3–6, 7–5, 6–3
Win	Oct 1971	Aberavon, UK	Hard (i)	(France) Françoise Dürr	(Australia) Evonne Goolagong (United States) Julie Heldman	7–5, 6–4
Loss	Nov 1971	Torquay, UK	Hard (i)	(France) Françoise Dürr	(Australia) Evonne Goolagong (United States) Julie Heldman	6–7, 4–6
Loss	Nov 1971	London, UK	Hard (i)	(France) Françoise Dürr	(Australia) Evonne Goolagong (United States) Julie Heldman	5–7, 4–6
Loss	Jan 1972	Sydney, Australia	Grass	(United States) Lesley Bowrey	(Australia) Evonne Goolagong (Australia) Patricia Edwards	1–6, 2–6
Win	Jan 1972	San Francisco, US	Carpet (i)	(United States) Rosie Casals	(Australia) Judy Dalton (France) Françoise Dürr	6–3, 5–7, 6–2
Win	Jan 1972	Long Beach, US	Carpet (i)	(United States) Rosie Casals	(Australia) Helen Gourlay (Australia) Karen Krantzcke	6–4, 5–7, 7–5
Win	Jan 1972	Boston, US	Carpet (i)	(United States) Rosie Casals	(Australia) Judy Dalton (France) Françoise Dürr	6–7, 6–0, 7–5
Loss	Feb 1972	Fort Lauderdale, US	Hard	(United States) Nancy Gunter	(Australia) Judy Dalton (France) Françoise Dürr	3–6, 2–6
Win	Aug 1972	Merion, US	Grass	(United States) Sharon Walsh	(South Africa) Brenda Kirk (South Africa) Pat Walkden-Pretorius	7–6, 6–2
Loss	Sep 1972	US Open	Grass	(Australia) Margaret Court	(France) Françoise Dürr (Netherlands) Betty Stöve	3–6, 6–1, 3–6
Win	Oct 1972	Billingham, UK	Hard (i)	(Australia) Margaret Court	(United States) Patti Hogan (United States) Sharon Walsh	6–3, 6–2
Win	Oct 1972	Edinburgh, UK	Hard (i)	(Australia) Margaret Court	(United States) Julie Heldman (Netherlands) Betty Stöve	6–2, 6–3
Win	Nov 1972	Aberavon, UK	Hard (i)	(Australia) Margaret Court	(United States) Julie Heldman (Netherlands) Betty Stöve	6–0, 6–3
Win	Nov 1972	Torquay, UK	Hard (i)	(Australia) Margaret Court	(South Africa) Brenda Kirk (United States) Sharon Walsh	6–4, 6–4
Win	Jan 1973	Australian Open	Grass	(Australia) Margaret Court	(Australia) Kerry Harris (Australia) Kerry Melville	6–4, 6–4
Win	Mar 1973	Fort Lauderdale, US	Clay	(France) Gail Chanfreau	(Australia) Evonne Goolagong (Australia) Janet Young	4–6, 6–3, 6–3
Loss	Mar 1973	Dallas, US	Hard	(France) Gail Chanfreau	(Australia) Evonne Goolagong (Australia) Janet Young	3–6, 2–6
Win	Jun 1973	French Open	Clay	(Australia) Margaret Court	(France) Françoise Dürr (Netherlands) Betty Stöve	6–2, 6–3
Win	Jun 1973	Rome, Italy	Clay	(Soviet Union) Olga Morozova	(Czechoslovakia) Martina Navratilova (Czechoslovakia) Renáta Tomanová	3–6, 6–2, 7–5
Win	Jul 1973	Dublin, Ireland	Grass	(Australia) Margaret Court	(Australia) Helen Gourlay (Australia) Karen Krantzcke	8–6, 3–6, 6–4
Win	Jul 1973	Hoylake, UK	Grass	(Australia) Karen Krantzcke	(United States) Patti Hogan (Australia) Sharon Walsh	5–7, 6–4, 6–1
Win	Sep 1973	US Open	Grass	(Australia) Margaret Court	(United States) Rosie Casals (United States) Billie Jean King	3–6, 6–3, 7–5
Win	Oct 1973	Aberavon Cup, UK	Carpet (i)	(United States) Marita Redondo	(United States) Julie Heldman (United States) Ann Kiyomura	4–6, 6–3, 7–6
Win	Nov 1973	Edinburgh Cup, UK	Carpet (i)	(United States) Marita Redondo	(United States) Julie Heldman (United States) Ann Kiyomura	6–1, 2–6, 6–4
Win	Nov 1973	Billingham Cup, UK	Carpet (i)	(United States) Marita Redondo	(United Kingdom) Glynis Coles (United States) Sharon Walsh	6–7, 6–3, 6–2
Loss	Nov 1973	Johannesburg, South Africa	Hard	(United States) Chris Evert	(South Africa) Linky Boshoff (South Africa) Ilana Kloss	6–7, 6–2, 1–6
Loss	Mar 1974	Dallas, US	Hard	(Australia) Karen Krantzcke	(Colombia) Isabel Fernández de Soto (Czechoslovakia) Martina Navratilova	3–6, 6–3, 3–6
Win	May 1974	Bournemouth, UK	Clay	(United States) Julie Heldman	(United States) Patti Hogan (United States) Sharon Walsh	6–2, 6–2
Loss	Oct 1974	Houston, US	Carpet (i)	(United States) Sue Stap	(United States) Janet Newberry (United States) Wendy Overton	6–4, 5–7, 2–6
Win	Nov 1974	London, UK	Hard (i)	(United States) Sharon Walsh	(United Kingdom) Lesley Charles (United Kingdom) Sue Mappin	6–2, 6–7, 6–2
Loss	Jan 1975	San Francisco, US	Carpet (i)	(United States) Rosie Casals	(United States) Chris Evert (United States) Billie Jean King	2–6, 5–7
Loss	Jan 1975	Sarasota, US	Carpet (i)	(Netherlands) Betty Stöve	(United States) Chris Evert (United States) Billie Jean King	4–6, 2–6
Loss	Mar 1975	Houston, US	Carpet (i)	(Australia) Evonne Goolagong	(France) Françoise Dürr (Netherlands) Betty Stöve	6–2, 3–6, 6–7^{(2–5)}
Win	Apr 1975	Tokyo, Japan	Carpet (i)	(Australia) Margaret Court	(United States) Rosie Casals (United States) Billie Jean King	6–7^{(2–7)}, 7–6^{(7–2)}, 6–2
Win	Apr 1975	Amelia Island, US	Clay	(Australia) Evonne Goolagong	(United States) Rosie Casals (Soviet Union) Olga Morozova	4–6, 6–4, 6–2
Win	Aug 1975	Harrison, US	Clay	(Australia) Margaret Court	(United States) Chris Evert (Czechoslovakia) Martina Navratilova	5–7, 7–6, 4–6
Win	Sep 1975	US Open	Grass	(Australia) Margaret Court	(United States) Rosie Casals (United States) Billie Jean King	7–5, 2–6, 7–6
Loss	Nov 1975	Stockholm, Sweden	Carpet	(Australia) Evonne Goolagong Cawley	(France) Françoise Dürr (Netherlands) Betty Stöve	3–6, 4–6
Loss	Nov 1975	Paris, France	Hard (i)	(Australia) Evonne Goolagong Cawley	(France) Françoise Dürr (Netherlands) Betty Stöve	6–2, 0–6, 3–6
Loss	Nov 1975	Edinburgh/London, UK	Hard (i)	(Australia) Evonne Goolagong Cawley	(France) Françoise Dürr (Netherlands) Betty Stöve	4–6, 6–7
Win	Jan 1976	Washington, US	Hard	(Soviet Union) Olga Morozova	(United States) Wendy Overton (United States) Mona Schallau	7–6, 6–2
Win	Jan 1976	Chicago, US	Hard	(Soviet Union) Olga Morozova	(Australia) Evonne Goolagong (United States) Martina Navratilova	6–7^{(4–5)}, 6–4, 6–4
Loss	Sep 1976	US Open	Clay	(Soviet Union) Olga Morozova	(South Africa) Linky Boshoff (South Africa) Ilana Kloss	1–6, 4–6
Loss	Sep 1976	Atlanta, US	Carpet (i)	(Netherlands) Betty Stöve	(United States) Rosie Casals (France) Françoise Dürr	0–6, 4–6
Win	Nov 1976	London, UK	Carpet (i)	(Netherlands) Betty Stöve	(United States) Rosie Casals (United States) Chris Evert	6–3, 2–6, 6–3
Win	Mar 1977	Philadelphia, US	Carpet (i)	(France) Françoise Dürr	(United States) Martina Navratilova (Netherlands) Betty Stöve	6–4, 4–6, 6–4
Loss	Apr 1977	Hilton Head, US	Clay	(France) Françoise Dürr	(United States) Rosie Casals (United States) Chris Evert	6–1, 2–6, 3–6
Loss	Apr 1977	Tokyo, Japan	Carpet (i)	(France) Françoise Dürr	(United States) Martina Navratilova (Netherlands) Betty Stöve	5–7, 3–6
Win	Nov 1977	Palm Springs, US	Hard	(France) Françoise Dürr	(Australia) Helen Gourlay Cawley (United States) Joanne Russell	6–1, 4–6, 6–4
Loss	Dec 1977	London, UK	Hard (i)	(Netherlands) Betty Stöve	(United States) Billie Jean King (Czechoslovakia) Renáta Tomanová	2–6, 3–6
Loss	Jan 1978	Hollywood, US	Carpet (i)	(France) Françoise Dürr	(United States) Rosie Casals (Australia) Wendy Turnbull	2–6, 4–6
Win	Feb 1978	Los Angeles, US	Carpet( i)	(Netherlands) Betty Stöve	(United States) Pam Teeguarden (South Africa) Greer Stevens	6–3, 6–2
Loss	Mar 1978	Philadelphia, US	Carpet (i)	(France) Françoise Dürr	(Australia) Kerry Melville (Australia) Wendy Turnbull	3–6, 5–7
Loss	Apr 1978	Salt Lake City, US	Carpet (i)	(France) Françoise Dürr	(United States) Billie Jean King (United States) Martina Navratilova	4–6, 4–6
Win	Oct 1978	Atlanta, US	Carpet (i)	(France) Françoise Dürr	(United States) Martina Navratilova (United States) Anne Smith	4–6, 6–2, 6–4
Win	Oct 1978	Brighton, UK	Carpet (i)	(Netherlands) Betty Stöve	(Socialist Federal Republic of Yugoslavia) Mima Jaušovec (United States) JoAnne Russell	6–0, 7–6
Loss	Mar 1979	Philadelphia, US	Carpet (i)	(United States) Renée Richards	(France) Françoise Dürr (Netherlands) Betty Stöve	4–6, 2–6
Loss	Jun 1979	French Open	Clay	(France) Françoise Dürr	(Netherlands) Betty Stöve (Australia) Wendy Turnbull	6–3, 5–7, 4–6
Loss	Feb 1980	Seattle, US	Carpet (i)	(South Africa) Greer Stevens	(United States) Rosie Casals (Australia) Wendy Turnbull	4–6, 6–2, 5–7
Win	May 1983	Italian Open	Clay	(Romania) Virginia Ruzici	(Argentina) Ivanna Madruga (France) Catherine Tanvier	6–3, 2–6, 6–1

== Grand Slam singles performance timeline ==
Key
W	F	SF	QF	#R	RR	Q#	DNQ	A	NH

(W) winner; (F) finalist; (SF) semifinalist; (QF) quarterfinalist; (#R) rounds 4, 3, 2, 1; (RR) round-robin stage; (Q#) qualification round; (DNQ) did not qualify; (A) absent; (NH) not held; (SR) strike rate (events won / competed); (W–L) win–loss record.

Tournament	1962	1963	1964	1965	1966	1967	1968	1969	1970	1971	1972	1973	1974	1975	1976	1977		1978	1979	1980	1981	1982	1983	1984	1985	Career SR
Australia	A	A	A	A	A	A	A	A	A	A	W	QF	A	A	A	A	A	A	A	A	A	A	2R	2R	2R	1 / 5
France	A	A	A	A	A	4R	A	2R	QF	1R	QF	3R	2R	A	A	A		A	2R	3R	4R	3R	1R	1R	2R	0 / 14
Wimbledon	2R	2R	2R	4R	2R	QF	1R	3R	4R	4R	QF	QF	SF	QF	SF	W		SF	QF	4R	2R	2R	QF	3R	3R	1 / 24
United States	A	A	4R	2R	QF	4R	W	SF	SF	A	QF	QF	2R	SF	2R	QF		3R	QF	3R	3R	1R	2R	2R	A	1 / 20
SR	0 / 1	0 / 1	0 / 2	0 / 2	0 / 2	0 / 3	1 / 2	0 / 3	0 / 3	0 / 2	1 / 4	0 / 4	0 / 3	0 / 2	0 / 2	1 / 2		0 / 2	0 / 3	0 / 3	0 / 3	0 / 3	0 / 4	0 / 4	0 / 3	3 / 63
Career statistics
Year-end ranking														2	3	4		4	8	15	30	59	42	61	89	

Note: The Australian Open was held twice in 1977, in January and December.

== Personal life ==
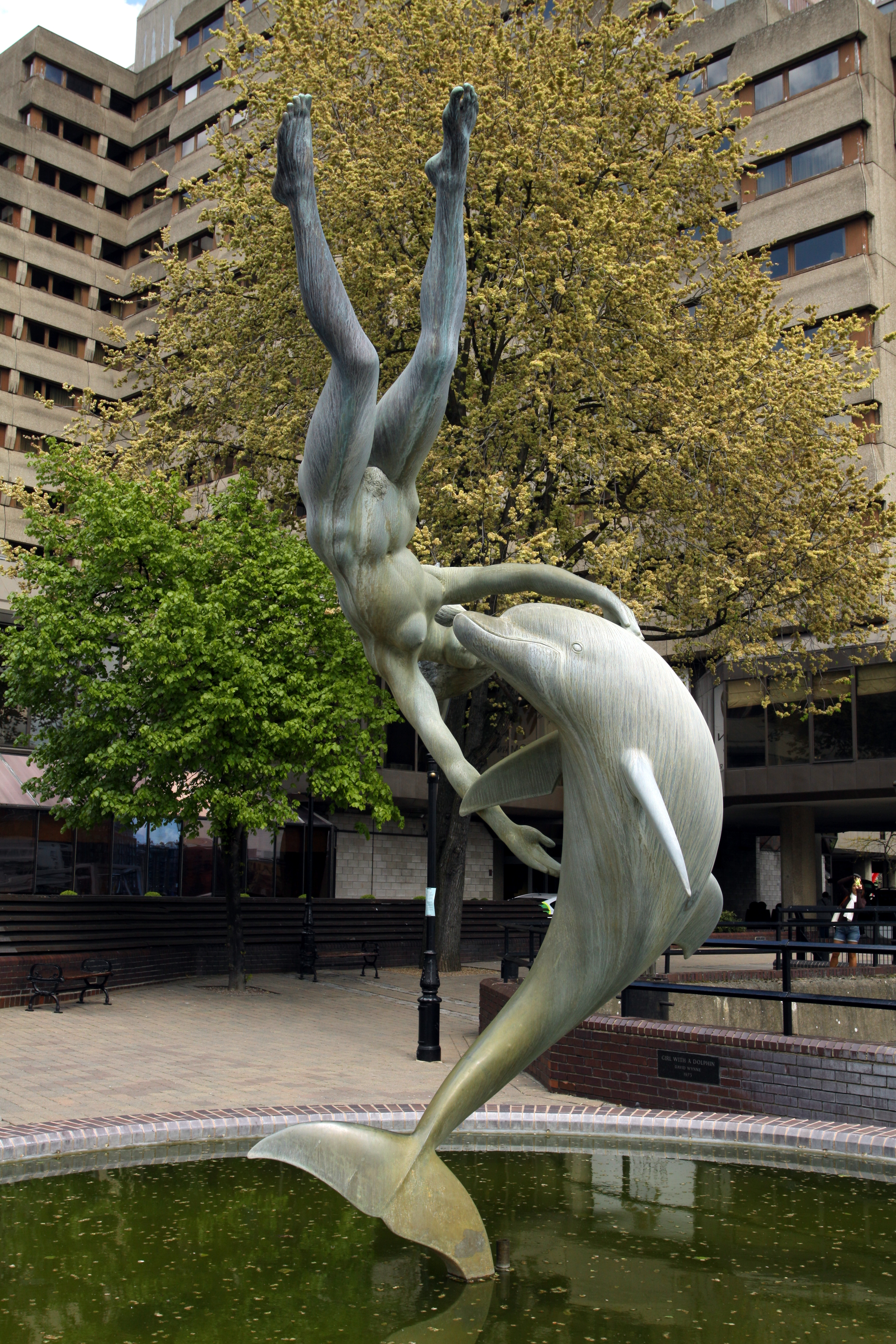
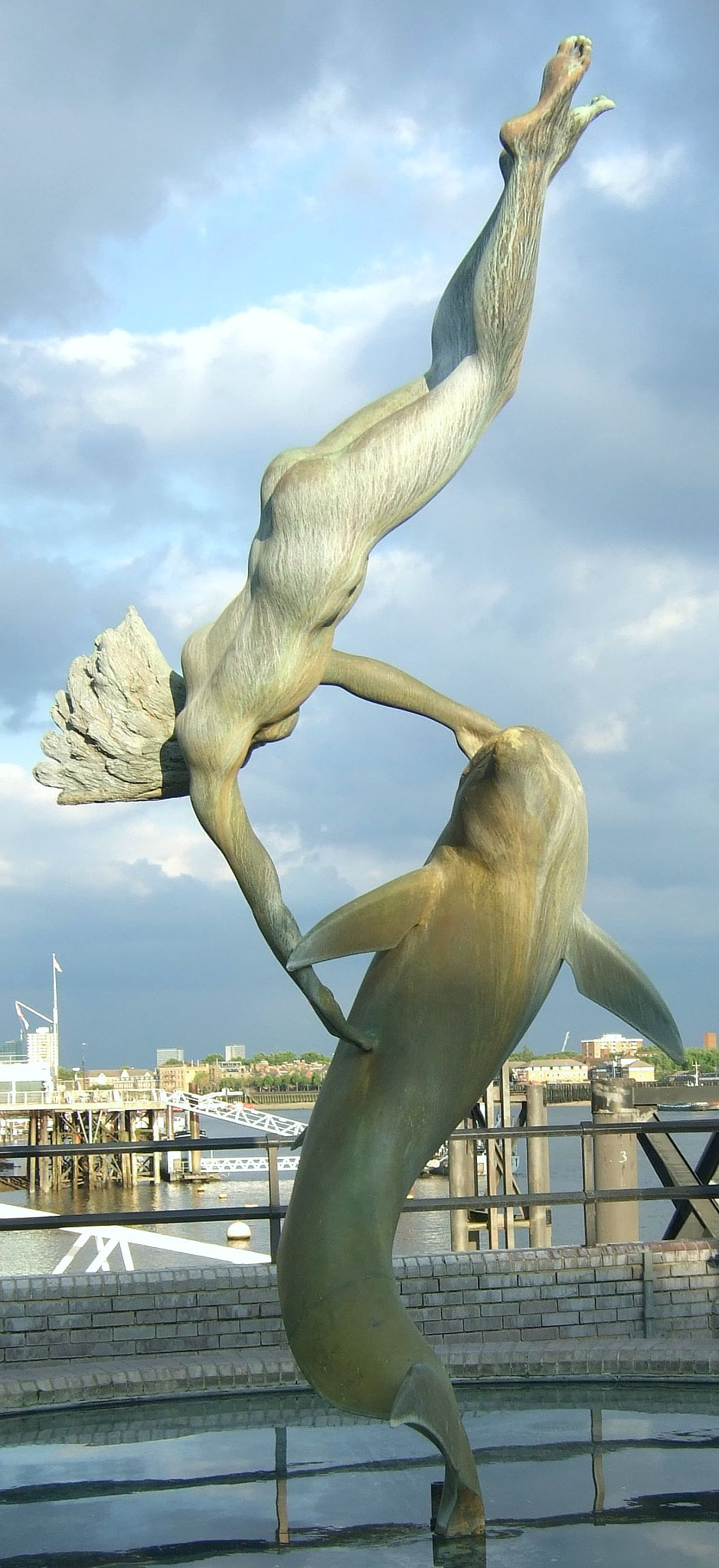
Girl with a Dolphin (1973)

Wade has no children and has never married. She has said "If I'd done better earlier, and my career had been at its peak earlier and I'd faded, I would probably have had a totally different life." She lives mostly in New York City and in Chelsea, London.

She posed for sculptor David Wynne for the 17-foot-high fountain Girl with a Dolphin, installed at Tower Bridge in 1973.

Preceded by John Curry	BBC Sports Personality of the Year; 1977	Succeeded by Steve Ovett
