= 1975 Bridgestone Doubles Championships =

- Date: April 11–12
- Edition: 1st
- Draw: 8D
- Prize money: $100,000
- Surface: Carpet / indoor
- Location: Osaka, Japan; Tokyo, Japan
- Venue: Yoyogi National Gymnasium

Champions

Doubles
- (Australia) Margaret Court / (United Kingdom) Virginia Wade
| WTA Doubles Championships | · 1976 → |

The 1975 Bridgestone Doubles Championships was a women's tennis tournament played on indoor carpet courts in Osaka and at the Yoyogi National Gymnasium in Tokyo in Japan that was part of the Women's International Grand Prix circuit of the 1975 WTA Tour. It was the first edition of the tournament and was held from April 11 through April 12, 1975.

It also served as the doubles tournament for the 1975 Virginia Slims Championships (WTA Finals) – the singles were played in Los Angeles, United States.

== Final ==
=== Doubles ===
(Australia) Margaret Court / (United Kingdom) Virginia Wade defeated (United States) Rosie Casals / (United States) Billie Jean King 6–7^{(2–7)}, 7–6^{(7–2)}, 6–2
