= 1992 Virginia Slims Championships – Doubles =

Doubles
- 1992 Virginia Slims Championships

Final
- Champions: (Spain) Arantxa Sánchez Vicario (Czechoslovakia) Helena Suková
- Runners-up: (Czech Republic) Jana Novotná (Latvia) Larisa Savchenko-Neiland
- Score: 7–6^{(7–4)}, 6–1

Details
- Draw: 8
- Seeds: 4

Events
Singles	Doubles
← 1991 ·	Virginia Slims Championships	· 1993 →

Arantxa Sánchez Vicario and Helena Suková defeated Jana Novotná and Larisa Savchenko-Neiland in the final, 7–6^{(7–4)}, 6–1 to win the doubles tennis title at the 1992 Virginia Slims Championships.

Martina Navratilova and Pam Shriver were the defending champions, but were defeated in the semifinals by Sánchez Vicario and Suková.

== Seeds ==
1. (Spain) Arantxa Sánchez Vicario / (Czechoslovakia) Helena Suková (champions)
2. (Czechoslovakia) Jana Novotná / (Latvia) Larisa Savchenko-Neiland (final)
3. (United States) Gigi Fernández / (Commonwealth of Independent States) Natasha Zvereva (semifinals)
4. (United States) Martina Navratilova / (United States) Pam Shriver (semifinals)

== Draw ==
=== Key ===
- Q = Qualifier
- WC = Wild card
- LL = Lucky loser
- Alt = Alternate
- SE = Special exempt
- PR = Protected ranking
- ITF = ITF entry
- JE = Junior exempt
- w/o = Walkover
- r = Retired
- d = Defaulted
- SR = Special ranking

=== Draw ===
First round
1	(Spain) Arantxa Sánchez Vicario (Czechoslovakia) Helena Suková	7^{7}	6
(United States) Patty Fendick (Czechoslovakia) Andrea Strnadová	6^{4}	4
4	(United States) Martina Navratilova (United States) Pam Shriver	6	6
(United States) Mary Joe Fernández (United States) Zina Garrison	1	4
(United States) Lori McNeil (Australia) Rennae Stubbs	4	6	4
3	(United States) Gigi Fernández (Commonwealth of Independent States) Natasha Zvereva	6	4	6
(Canada) Jill Hetherington (United States) Kathy Rinaldi	4	6^{3}
2	(Czechoslovakia) Jana Novotná (Latvia) Larisa Savchenko-Neiland	6	7^{7}

Semifinals
1	(Spain) Arantxa Sánchez Vicario (Czechoslovakia) Helena Suková	6	7
4	(United States) Martina Navratilova (United States) Pam Shriver	4	5
3	(United States) Gigi Fernández (Commonwealth of Independent States) Natasha Zvereva	7^{7}	2	5
2	(Czechoslovakia) Jana Novotná (Latvia) Larisa Savchenko-Neiland	6^{5}	6	7

Final
1	(Spain) Arantxa Sánchez Vicario (Czechoslovakia) Helena Suková	7^{7}	6
2	(Czechoslovakia) Jana Novotná (Latvia) Larisa Savchenko-Neiland	6^{4}	1
