= 1992 Virginia Slims Championships – Singles =

Singles
- 1992 Virginia Slims Championships

Final
- Champion: (Federal Republic of Yugoslavia) Monica Seles
- Runner-up: (United States) Martina Navratilova
- Score: 7–5, 6–3, 6–1

Details
- Draw: 16
- Seeds: 8

Events
Singles	Doubles
← 1991 ·	Virginia Slims Championships	· 1993 →

Two-time defending champion Monica Seles defeated Martina Navratilova in a rematch of the previous year's final, 7–5, 6–3, 6–1 to win the singles tennis title at the 1992 Virginia Slims Championships.

== Seeds ==
1. (Federal Republic of Yugoslavia) Monica Seles (champion)
2. (Germany) Steffi Graf (first round)
3. (Argentina) Gabriela Sabatini (semifinals)
4. (United States) Martina Navratilova (final)
5. (Spain) Arantxa Sánchez Vicario (quarterfinals)
6. (United States) Mary Joe Fernandez (first round)
7. (United States) Jennifer Capriati (quarterfinals)
8. (Spain) Conchita Martínez (quarterfinals)

== Draw ==
=== Key ===
- Q = Qualifier
- WC = Wild card
- LL = Lucky loser
- Alt = Alternate
- SE = Special exempt
- PR = Protected ranking
- ITF = ITF entry
- JE = Junior exempt
- w/o = Walkover
- r = Retired
- d = Defaulted
- SR = Special ranking

=== Finals ===
- NB: The final was the best of 5 sets while all other rounds were the best of 3 sets.

First round
1	(Federal Republic of Yugoslavia) Monica Seles	6	6
(France) Nathalie Tauziat	1	2
(Czechoslovakia) Jana Novotná	7^{7}	6
6	(United States) Mary Joe Fernández	6^{3}	2
3	(Argentina) Gabriela Sabatini	6	6
(United States) Amy Frazier	0	2
(Czechoslovakia) Helena Suková	6^{3}	1
7	(United States) Jennifer Capriati	7^{7}	6
5	(Spain) Arantxa Sánchez Vicario	7^{7}	6
(United States) Zina Garrison-Jackson	6^{0}	1
(Switzerland) Manuela Maleeva-Fragnière	2	2
4	(United States) Martina Navratilova	6	6
8	(Spain) Conchita Martínez	6	6
(Bulgaria) Katerina Maleeva	4	3
(United States) Lori McNeil	7^{7}	6
2	(Germany) Steffi Graf	6^{1}	4

Quarterfinals
1	(Federal Republic of Yugoslavia) Monica Seles	3	6	6
(Czechoslovakia) Jana Novotná	6	4	1
3	(Argentina) Gabriela Sabatini	6	3	6
7	(United States) Jennifer Capriati	1	6	4
5	(Spain) Arantxa Sánchez Vicario	1	6	2
4	(United States) Martina Navratilova	6	2	6
8	(Spain) Conchita Martínez	6	3	2
(United States) Lori McNeil	3	6	6

Semifinals
1	(Federal Republic of Yugoslavia) Monica Seles	7^{8}	6
3	(Argentina) Gabriela Sabatini	6^{6}	1
4	(United States) Martina Navratilova	7^{7}	6
(United States) Lori McNeil	6^{5}	4

Final
1	(Federal Republic of Yugoslavia) Monica Seles	7	6	6
4	(United States) Martina Navratilova	5	3	1

== See also ==
- WTA Tour Championships appearances
