= 1976 Bridgestone Doubles Championships =

- Date: April 21–25
- Edition: 2nd
- Draw: 7D
- Prize money: $100,000
- Surface: Carpet / indoor
- Location: Osaka, Japan; Tokyo, Japan
- Venue: Yoyogi National Gymnasium

Champions

Doubles
- (United States) Billie Jean King / (Netherlands) Betty Stöve
← 1975 ·	WTA Doubles Championships	· 1977 →

The 1976 Bridgestone Doubles Championships was a women's tennis tournament played on indoor carpet courts in Osaka and at the Yoyogi National Gymnasium in Tokyo in Japan that was part of the Colgate Series of the 1976 WTA Tour. It was the second edition of the tournament and was held from April 21 through April 25, 1976.

It also served as the doubles tournament for the 1976 Virginia Slims Championships (WTA Finals) – the singles were played in Los Angeles, United States.

== Final ==
=== Doubles ===
(United States) Billie Jean King / (Netherlands) Betty Stöve defeated (United States) Mona Guerrant / (United States) Ann Kiyomura 6–3, 6–2
