= 1977 Bridgestone Doubles Championships =

- Date: April 4–10
- Edition: 3rd
- Draw: 8D
- Prize money: $100,000
- Surface: Carpet / indoor
- Location: Tokyo, Japan
- Venue: Yoyogi National Gymnasium

Champions

Doubles
- (United States) Martina Navratilova / (Netherlands) Betty Stöve
| ← 1976 · | WTA Doubles Championships | · 1978 → |

The 1977 Bridgestone Doubles Championships was a women's tennis tournament played on indoor carpet courts at the Yoyogi National Gymnasium in Tokyo in Japan that was part of the Colgate Series of the 1977 WTA Tour. It was the third edition of the tournament and was held from April 4 through April 10, 1977.

It also served as the doubles tournament for the 1977 Virginia Slims Championships (WTA Finals) – the singles were played in New York City, United States.

== Final ==
=== Doubles ===
(United States) Martina Navratilova / (Netherlands) Betty Stöve defeated (France) Françoise Dürr / (United Kingdom) Virginia Wade 7–5, 6–3

== See also ==
- 1977 Colgate Series Championships
