= 1990 in tennis =

This page covers all the important events in the sport of tennis in 1990. Primarily, it provides the results of notable tournaments throughout the year on both the ATP and WTA Tours, the Davis Cup, and the Fed Cup.

== ITF ==
=== Grand Slam events ===
==== Australian Open ====
The 1990 Australian Open, the first major of the year, was a tennis tournament that took place at Flinders Park in Melbourne. It was held from 15 to 28 January.

Category	Champion(s)	Finalist(s)	Score
Men's singles	(Czechoslovakia) Ivan Lendl	(Sweden) Stefan Edberg	4–6, 7–6^{(7–3)}, 5–2 ret.
Women's singles	(West Germany) Steffi Graf	(United States) Mary Joe Fernández	6–3, 6–4
Men's doubles	(South Africa) Pieter Aldrich (South Africa) Danie Visser	(Canada) Grant Connell (Canada) Glenn Michibata	6–4, 4–6, 6–1, 6–4
Women's doubles	(Czechoslovakia) Jana Novotná (Czechoslovakia) Helena Suková	(United States) Patty Fendick (United States) Mary Joe Fernández	7–6^{(7–5)}, 7–6^{(8–6)}
Mixed doubles	(Soviet Union) Natasha Zvereva (United States) Jim Pugh	(United States) Zina Garrison (United States) Rick Leach	4–6, 6–2, 6–3

==== French Open ====
The 1990 French Open took place at the Stade Roland Garros in Paris, France from 28 May until 10 June.

Category	Champion(s)	Finalist(s)	Score
Men's singles	(Ecuador) Andrés Gómez	(United States) Andre Agassi	6–3, 2–6, 6–4, 6–0
Women's singles	(Socialist Federal Republic of Yugoslavia) Monica Seles	(West Germany) Steffi Graf	7–6^{(8–6)}, 6–4
Men's doubles	(Spain) Sergio Casal (Spain) Emilio Sánchez Vicario	(Socialist Federal Republic of Yugoslavia) Goran Ivanišević (Czech Republic) Petr Korda	7–5, 6–3
Women's doubles	(Czech Republic) Jana Novotná (Czech Republic) Helena Suková	(Latvian Soviet Socialist Republic) Larisa Neiland (Byelorussian Soviet Socialist Republic) Natasha Zvereva	6–4, 7–5
Mixed doubles	(Spain) Arantxa Sánchez Vicario (Mexico) Jorge Lozano	(Australia) Nicole Provis (South Africa) Danie Visser	7–6^{(7–5)}, 7–6^{(10–8)}

==== Wimbledon ====
The 1990 Wimbledon Championships, the only major played on grass courts, took place at the All England Lawn Tennis and Croquet Club in Wimbledon, London, England. It was held from 25 June to 8 July.

Category	Champion(s)	Finalist(s)	Score
Men's singles	(Sweden) Stefan Edberg	(West Germany) Boris Becker	6–2, 6–2, 3–6, 3–6, 6–4
Women's singles	(United States) Martina Navratilova	(United States) Zina Garrison	6–4, 6–1
Men's doubles	(United States) Rick Leach (United States) Jim Pugh	(South Africa) Pieter Aldrich (South Africa) Danie Visser	7–6^{(7–5)}, 7–6^{(7–4)}, 7–6^{(7–5)}
Women's doubles	(Czechoslovakia) Jana Novotná (Czechoslovakia) Helena Suková	(United States) Kathy Jordan (Australia) Elizabeth Smylie	6–4, 6–1
Mixed doubles	(United States) Zina Garrison (United States) Rick Leach	(Australia) Elizabeth Smylie; John Fitzgerald	7–5, 6–2

==== US Open ====
The 1990 US Open, the last tennis major of the year, was played at the USTA National Tennis Center in New York City, United States, being held from 27 August to 9 September.

Category	Champion(s)	Finalist(s)	Score
Men's singles	(United States) Pete Sampras	(United States) Andre Agassi	6–4, 6–3, 6–2
Women's singles	(Argentina) Gabriela Sabatini	(West Germany) Steffi Graf	6–2, 7–6^{(7–4)}
Men's doubles	(South Africa) Pieter Aldrich (South Africa) Danie Visser	(United States) Paul Annacone (United States) David Wheaton	6–2, 7–6^{(7–3)}, 6–2
Women's doubles	(United States) Gigi Fernández (United States) Martina Navratilova	(Czechoslovakia) Jana Novotná (Czechoslovakia) Helena Suková	6–2, 6–4
Mixed doubles	(Australia) Elizabeth Smylie (Australia) Todd Woodbridge	(Byelorussian Soviet Socialist Republic) Natalia Zvereva (United States) Jim Pugh	6–4, 6–2

=== Davis Cup ===
1990 Davis Cup Champions
(United States)
United States
29th title

United States
3
Suncoast Dome, St. Petersburg, United States
30 November – 2 December
Clay (indoors)

Australia
2

			1	2	3	4	5
1	(United States) (Australia)	Andre Agassi; Richard Fromberg	4; 6	6; 2	4; 6	6; 2	6; 4
2	(United States) (Australia)	Michael Chang; Darren Cahill	6; 2	7^{7} 6^{5}	6; 0
3	(United States) (Australia)	Rick Leach / Jim Pugh; Pat Cash / John Fitzgerald	6; 4	6; 2	3; 6	7^{7} 6^{2}
4	(United States) (Australia)	Andre Agassi; Darren Cahill	6; 4	4; 6				retired
5	(United States) (Australia)	Michael Chang; Richard Fromberg	5; 7	6; 2	3; 6

=== Fed Cup ===
1990 champions
(United States)
United States
14th title

United States
2
Peachtree World of Tennis, Norcross, United States
21–29 July
Hard (outdoors)

Soviet Union
1

			1	2	3
1	(United States) (Soviet Union)	Jennifer Capriati; Leila Meskhi	7^{7} 6^{4}	6; 2
2	(United States) (Soviet Union)	Zina Garrison; Natasha Zvereva	6; 4	3; 6	3; 6
3	(United States) (Soviet Union)	Gigi Fernández / Zina Garrison; Larisa Savchenko / Natasha Zvereva	6; 4	6; 3

=== Hopman Cup ===
1990 Hopman Cup Champions
(Spain)
Spain
1st title

Spain
2
Burswood Entertainment Complex
1 January
Hard (indoors)

United States
1

			1	2	3
1	(Spain) (United States)	Emilio Sánchez; John McEnroe	5; 7	7; 5	7; 5
2	(Spain) (United States)	Emilio Sánchez / Arantxa Sánchez; John McEnroe / Pam Shriver	3; 6	2; 6
3	(Spain) (United States)	Arantxa Sánchez; Pam Shriver	6; 3	6; 3

== ATP Tour ==
=== Year-End Championships ===
Singles

Championship	Champions	Finalists	Score in the final
Frankfurt	(United States) Andre Agassi	(Sweden) Stefan Edberg	5–7, 7–6^{(7–5)}, 7–5, 6–2

Doubles

Championship	Champions	Finalists	Score in the final
Gold Coast	(France) Guy Forget (Switzerland) Jakob Hlasek	(Spain) Sergio Casal (Spain) Emilio Sánchez	6–4, 7–6^{(7–5)}, 5–7, 6–4

=== Grand Slam Cup ===
Championship	Champions	Finalists	Score in the final
Munich	(United States) Pete Sampras	(United States) Brad Gilbert	6–3, 6–4, 6–2

=== ATP Championship Series single week ===
* First-time champion

Masters	Singles champions	Runners-up	Score	Doubles champions	Runners-up	Score
Indian Wells Singles – Doubles	(Sweden) Stefan Edberg*	(United States) Andre Agassi	6–4, 5–7, 7–6^{(7–1)}, 7–6^{(8–6)}	(Germany) Boris Becker* (France) Guy Forget*	(United States) Jim Grabb (United States) Patrick McEnroe	6–4, 6–3
Miami Singles – Doubles	(United States) Andre Agassi*	(Sweden) Stefan Edberg	6–1, 6–4, 0–6, 6–2	(United States) Rick Leach* (United States) Jim Pugh*	(Germany) Boris Becker (Brazil) Cássio Motta	6–3, 6–4
Monte Carlo Singles – Doubles	(Soviet Union) Andrei Chesnokov*	(Austria) Thomas Muster	7–5, 6–3, 6–3	(Czechoslovakia) Petr Korda* (Czechoslovakia) Tomáš Šmíd*	(Ecuador) Andrés Gómez (Spain) Javier Sánchez	6–2, 6–1
Hamburg Singles – Doubles	(Spain) Juan Aguilera*	(Germany) Boris Becker	6–1, 6–0, 7–6^{(9–7)}	(Spain) Sergi Bruguera* (United States) Jim Courier*	(Germany) Udo Riglewski (Germany) Michael Stich	4–6, 6–1, 7–6
Rome Singles – Doubles	(Austria) Thomas Muster*	(Soviet Union) Andrei Chesnokov	6–1, 6–3, 6–1	(Spain) Sergio Casal* (Spain) Emilio Sánchez*	(United States) Jim Courier (United States) Martin Davis	7–6, 7–5
Toronto Singles – Doubles	(United States) Michael Chang*	(United States) Jay Berger	4–6, 6–3, 7–6^{(7–2)}	(United States) Paul Annacone* (United States) David Wheaton*	(Australia) Broderick Dyke (Sweden) Peter Lundgren	7–6, 6–1
Cincinnati Singles – Doubles	(Sweden) Stefan Edberg	(United States) Brad Gilbert	6–1, 6–1	(Australia) Darren Cahill* (Australia) Mark Kratzmann*	(United Kingdom) Neil Broad (South Africa) Gary Muller	7–6, 6–4
Stockholm Singles – Doubles	(Germany) Boris Becker*	(Sweden) Stefan Edberg	6–4, 6–0, 6–3	(France) Guy Forget	(Australia) John Fitzgerald (Sweden) Anders Järryd	6–2, 6–3
Stockholm Singles – Doubles	(Germany) Boris Becker*	(Sweden) Stefan Edberg	6–4, 6–0, 6–3	(Switzerland) Jakob Hlasek*	(Australia) John Fitzgerald (Sweden) Anders Järryd	6–2, 6–3
Paris Singles – Doubles	(Sweden) Stefan Edberg	(Germany) Boris Becker	3–3 ret.	(United States) Scott Davis* (United States) David Pate*	(Australia) Darren Cahill (Australia) Mark Kratzmann	7–6, 7–6

== WTA Tour ==
=== Year-End Championships ===
Singles

Championship	Champions	Finalists	Score in the final
New York	(Socialist Federal Republic of Yugoslavia) Monica Seles	(Argentina) Gabriela Sabatini	6–4, 5–7, 3–6, 6–4, 6-2

Doubles

Championship	Champions	Finalists	Score in the final
New York	(United States) Kathy Jordan (Australia) Elizabeth Smylie	(Argentina) Mercedes Paz (Spain) Arantxa Sánchez	7–6^{(7–4)}, 6–4

=== Tier I Series ===
* First-time champion

Tournament	Singles champions	Runners-up	Score	Doubles champions	Runners-up	Score
Chicago Open Singles – Doubles	(United States) Martina Navratilova*	(Switzerland) Manuela Maleeva	6–3, 6–2	(United States) Martina Navratilova* (United States) Anne Smith*	(Spain) Arantxa Sánchez Vicario (France) Nathalie Tauziat	6–7^{(9–11)}, 6–4, 6–3
Miami Open Singles – Doubles	(Socialist Federal Republic of Yugoslavia) Monica Seles*	(Austria) Judith Wiesner	6–1, 6–2	(Czechoslovakia) Jana Novotná* (Czechoslovakia) Helena Suková*	(United States) Betsy Nagelsen (United States) Robin White	6–4, 6–3
Hilton Head Open Singles – Doubles	(United States) Martina Navratilova	(United States) Jennifer Capriati	6–2, 6–4	(United States) Martina Navratilova	(Argentina) Mercedes Paz (Soviet Union) Natasha Zvereva	6–2, 6–1
Hilton Head Open Singles – Doubles	(United States) Martina Navratilova	(United States) Jennifer Capriati	6–2, 6–4	(Spain) Arantxa Sánchez Vicario*	(Argentina) Mercedes Paz (Soviet Union) Natasha Zvereva	6–2, 6–1
Italian Open Singles – Doubles	(Socialist Federal Republic of Yugoslavia) Monica Seles	(United States) Martina Navratilova	6–1, 6–1	(Canada) Helen Kelesi* (Socialist Federal Republic of Yugoslavia) Monica Seles*	(Italy) Laura Garrone (Italy) Laura Golarsa	6–3, 6–4
German Open Singles – Doubles	(Socialist Federal Republic of Yugoslavia) Monica Seles	(West Germany) Steffi Graf	6–4, 6–3	(Australia) Nicole Provis* (South Africa) Elna Reinach*	(Australia) Hana Mandlíková (Czechoslovakia) Jana Novotná	6–2, 6–1
Canadian Open Singles – Doubles	(Germany) Steffi Graf*	(Bulgaria) Katerina Maleeva	6–1, 6–7^{(6–8)}, 6–3	(United States) Betsy Nagelsen* (Argentina) Gabriela Sabatini*	(Canada) Helen Kelesi (Italy) Raffaella Reggi	3–6, 6–2, 6–2

== Tennis Hall of Fame ==
Class	Inductees	Category
Class of 1990	(United States) Joseph Cullman	Contributor
Class of 1990	(Czechoslovakia) Jan Kodeš	Player

== See also ==
- 1990 in sports
