= 1990 ATP Championship Series, Single Week =

Men's professional tennis tour

Details
- Duration: March 5 – November 4
- Edition: 1st
- Tournaments: 9

Achievements (singles)
- Most titles: (Sweden) Stefan Edberg (3)
- Most finals: (Sweden) Stefan Edberg (5)

The 1990 ATP Championship Series, Single Week was a series of tennis tournament that was part of the 1990 ATP Tour, the elite tour for professional men's tennis organised by the Association of Tennis Professionals. It formed the tier below the Grand Slam tournaments.

== Results ==
* First-time champion

Masters	Singles champions	Runners-up	Score	Doubles champions	Runners-up	Score
Indian Wells Singles – Doubles	(Sweden) Stefan Edberg*	(United States) Andre Agassi	6–4, 5–7, 7–6^{(7–1)}, 7–6^{(8–6)}	(Germany) Boris Becker* (France) Guy Forget*	(United States) Jim Grabb (United States) Patrick McEnroe	6–4, 6–3
Miami Singles – Doubles	(United States) Andre Agassi*	(Sweden) Stefan Edberg	6–1, 6–4, 0–6, 6–2	(United States) Rick Leach* (United States) Jim Pugh*	(Germany) Boris Becker (Brazil) Cássio Motta	6–3, 6–4
Monte Carlo Singles – Doubles	(Soviet Union) Andrei Chesnokov*	(Austria) Thomas Muster	7–5, 6–3, 6–3	(Czechoslovakia) Petr Korda* (Czechoslovakia) Tomáš Šmíd*	(Ecuador) Andrés Gómez (Spain) Javier Sánchez	6–2, 6–1
Hamburg Singles – Doubles	(Spain) Juan Aguilera*	(Germany) Boris Becker	6–1, 6–0, 7–6^{(9–7)}	(Spain) Sergi Bruguera* (United States) Jim Courier*	(Germany) Udo Riglewski (Germany) Michael Stich	4–6, 6–1, 7–6
Rome Singles – Doubles	(Austria) Thomas Muster*	(Soviet Union) Andrei Chesnokov	6–1, 6–3, 6–1	(Spain) Sergio Casal* (Spain) Emilio Sánchez*	(United States) Jim Courier (United States) Martin Davis	7–6, 7–5
Toronto Singles – Doubles	(United States) Michael Chang*	(United States) Jay Berger	4–6, 6–3, 7–6^{(7–2)}	(United States) Paul Annacone* (United States) David Wheaton*	(Australia) Broderick Dyke (Sweden) Peter Lundgren	7–6, 6–1
Cincinnati Singles – Doubles	(Sweden) Stefan Edberg	(United States) Brad Gilbert	6–1, 6–1	(Australia) Darren Cahill* (Australia) Mark Kratzmann*	(United Kingdom) Neil Broad (South Africa) Gary Muller	7–6, 6–4
Stockholm Singles – Doubles	(Germany) Boris Becker*	(Sweden) Stefan Edberg	6–4, 6–0, 6–3	(France) Guy Forget	(Australia) John Fitzgerald (Sweden) Anders Järryd	6–2, 6–3
Stockholm Singles – Doubles	(Germany) Boris Becker*	(Sweden) Stefan Edberg	6–4, 6–0, 6–3	(Switzerland) Jakob Hlasek*	(Australia) John Fitzgerald (Sweden) Anders Järryd	6–2, 6–3
Paris Singles – Doubles	(Sweden) Stefan Edberg	(Germany) Boris Becker	3–3 ret.	(United States) Scott Davis* (United States) David Pate*	(Australia) Darren Cahill (Australia) Mark Kratzmann	7–6, 7–6

== Tournament details ==
Key

- Q = Qualifier
- WC = Wild card
- LL = Lucky loser
- Alt = Alternate
- ITF = ITF entry
- PR = Protected ranking
- SR = Special ranking
- SE = Special exempt
- JE = Junior exempt
- JR = Junior Accelerator Programme entrant
- CO = College Accelerator Programme entrant
- NG = Next Gen Accelerator Program entrant
- w/o = Walkover
- r = Retired
- d = Defaulted

=== Indian Wells ===
Tournament name	Newsweek Champions Cup
Dates	March 5 – 11
Surface	Hard (outdoors)
Location	Indian Wells, California, United States

==== Singles ====
Quarterfinals
1	(West Germany) Boris Becker	6	6
8	(United States) Jay Berger	1	2
14	(Spain) Emilio Sánchez	1	6^{3}
6	(United States) Andre Agassi	6	7^{7}
(United States) Jim Courier	6	7^{7}
4	(United States) Aaron Krickstein	2	6^{2}
(Sweden) Jan Gunnarsson	2	2
WC/2	(Sweden) Stefan Edberg	6	6

Semifinals
1	(West Germany) Boris Becker	4	1
6	(United States) Andre Agassi	6	6
(United States) Jim Courier	4	1
WC/2	(Sweden) Stefan Edberg	6	6

Final
6	(United States) Andre Agassi	4	7	6^{1}	6^{6}
WC/2	(Sweden) Stefan Edberg	6	5	7^{7}	7^{8}

==== Doubles ====
Semifinals
(United Kingdom) Neil Broad (South Africa) Gary Muller	6^{3}	6	4
(West Germany) Boris Becker (France) Guy Forget	7^{7}	2	6
3	(United States) Jim Grabb (United States) Patrick McEnroe	6	3	6
2	(United States) Rick Leach (United States) Jim Pugh	2	6	3

Final
(West Germany) Boris Becker (France) Guy Forget	4	6	6
3	(United States) Jim Grabb (United States) Patrick McEnroe	6	4	3

=== Key Biscayne ===
Tournament name	Lipton International Players Championships
Dates	March 12 – 26
Surface	Hard (outdoors)
Location	Key Biscayne, Florida, United States

==== Singles ====
Quarterfinals
15	(Spain) Emilio Sánchez	6	6
10	(Argentina) Martín Jaite	3	3
3	(Sweden) Stefan Edberg	6^{7}	7^{7}	7^{8}
(Switzerland) Jakob Hlasek	7^{9}	6^{5}	6^{6}
5	(United States) Andre Agassi	3	6	6
14	(United States) Jim Courier	6	3	1
7	(United States) Jay Berger	w/o
16	(United States) Pete Sampras

Semifinals
15	(Spain) Emilio Sánchez	1	5
3	(Sweden) Stefan Edberg	6	7
5	(United States) Andre Agassi	5	6	6
7	(United States) Jay Berger	7	1	1

Final
3	(Sweden) Stefan Edberg	1	4	6	2
5	(United States) Andre Agassi	6	6	0	6

==== Doubles ====
Semifinals
7	(Australia) Darren Cahill (Australia) Mark Kratzmann	6	4
13	(West Germany) Boris Becker (Brazil) Cássio Motta	7	6
6	(France) Guy Forget (Switzerland) Jakob Hlasek	2	2
2	(United States) Rick Leach (United States) Jim Pugh	6	6

Final
13	(West Germany) Boris Becker (Brazil) Cássio Motta	4	6	3
2	(United States) Rick Leach (United States) Jim Pugh	6	3	6

=== Monte Carlo ===
Tournament name	Monte Carlo Open
Dates	April 23 – 29
Surface	Clay (outdoors)
Location	Roquebrune-Cap-Martin, France

==== Singles ====
Quarterfinals
(Spain) Juan Aguilera	3	4
(Austria) Thomas Muster	6	6
14	(Austria) Horst Skoff	2	7^{7}	4
WC	(France) Henri Leconte	6	6^{3}	6
12	(Soviet Union) Andrei Chesnokov	6	6
WC	(Switzerland) Marc Rosset	3	2
7	(Spain) Emilio Sánchez	4	7	7^{7}
2	(West Germany) Boris Becker	6	5	6^{3}

Semifinals
(Austria) Thomas Muster	6	6
WC	(France) Henri Leconte	2	3
12	(Soviet Union) Andrei Chesnokov	4	6	7^{7}
7	(Spain) Emilio Sánchez	6	1	6^{2}

Final
(Austria) Thomas Muster	5	3	3
12	(Soviet Union) Andrei Chesnokov	7	6	6

==== Doubles ====
Semifinals
8	(Czechoslovakia) Petr Korda (Czechoslovakia) Tomáš Šmíd	6	7
6	(Iran) Mansour Bahrami (France) Eric Winogradsky	4	6
4	(Ecuador) Andrés Gómez (Spain) Javier Sánchez	5	6	7
(Netherlands) Paul Haarhuis (Netherlands) Michiel Schapers	7	3	6

Final
8	(Czechoslovakia) Petr Korda (Czechoslovakia) Tomáš Šmíd	6	7
4	(Ecuador) Andrés Gómez (Spain) Javier Sánchez	4	6

=== Hamburg ===
Tournament name	ATP German Open
Dates	May 7 – 13
Surface	Clay (outdoors)
Location	Hamburg, Germany

==== Singles ====
Quarterfinals
1	(West Germany) Boris Becker	6	6
(United States) Jimmy Arias	3	1
WC	(France) Henri Leconte	6	6
LL	(Argentina) Franco Davín	3	3
5	(United States) Jay Berger	3	6	4
(France) Guy Forget	6	3	6
(Spain) Juan Aguilera	6	6
15	(Sweden) Magnus Gustafsson	1	4

Semifinals
1	(West Germany) Boris Becker	6	3	6
WC	(France) Henri Leconte	3	6	3
(France) Guy Forget	5	6^{6}
(Spain) Juan Aguilera	7	7^{8}

Final
1	(West Germany) Boris Becker	1	0	6^{7}
(Spain) Juan Aguilera	6	6	7^{9}

==== Doubles ====
Semifinals
(Argentina) Gustavo Luza (Brazil) Cássio Motta	1	3
WC	(Spain) Sergi Bruguera (United States) Jim Courier	6	6
(West Germany) Udo Riglewski (West Germany) Michael Stich	7	6
(Czechoslovakia) Josef Čihák (Czechoslovakia) Cyril Suk	6	2

Final
WC	(Spain) Sergi Bruguera (United States) Jim Courier	7	6
(West Germany) Udo Riglewski (West Germany) Michael Stich	6	2

=== Rome ===
Tournament name	Peugeot Italian Open
Dates	May 14 – 20
Surface	Clay (outdoors)
Location	Rome, Italy

==== Singles ====
Quarterfinals
16	(Argentina) Alberto Mancini	6^{3}	0
8	(Soviet Union) Andrei Chesnokov	7^{7}	6
4	(Spain) Emilio Sánchez	7^{7}	6
12	(Argentina) G Pérez Roldán	6^{5}	2
(Italy) Omar Camporese	4	1
3	(Ecuador) Andrés Gómez	6	6
10	(Austria) Thomas Muster	6	3	6
(France) Guy Forget	2	6	3

Semifinals
8	(Soviet Union) Andrei Chesnokov	6^{1}	6	7^{7}
4	(Spain) Emilio Sánchez	7^{7}	4	6^{5}
3	(Ecuador) Andrés Gómez	7	4	6^{2}
10	(Austria) Thomas Muster	5	6	7^{7}

Final
8	(Soviet Union) Andrei Chesnokov	1	3	1
10	(Austria) Thomas Muster	6	6	6

==== Doubles ====
Semifinals
(Italy) Simone Colombo (Sweden) Nicklas Utgren	2	3
5	(Spain) Sergio Casal (Spain) Emilio Sánchez	6	6
(Australia) Broderick Dyke (Australia) Laurie Warder	3	4
(United States) Jim Courier (United States) Martin Davis	6	6

Final
5	(Spain) Sergio Casal (Spain) Emilio Sánchez	7^{7}	7
(United States) Jim Courier (United States) Martin Davis	6^{2}	5

=== Toronto ===
Tournament name	Player's International
Dates	July 23 – 29
Surface	Hard (outdoors)
Location	Toronto, Ontario, Canada

==== Singles ====
Quarterfinals
1	(United States) Andre Agassi	6	5	5
7	(United States) Michael Chang	4	7	7
3	(United States) John McEnroe	6^{4}	6	3
5	(United States) Pete Sampras	7^{7}	4	6
6	(United States) Tim Mayotte	6^{2}	4
4	(United States) Jay Berger	7^{7}	6
(Switzerland) Jakob Hlasek	6	6
(United States) Todd Witsken	4	2

Semifinals
7	(United States) Michael Chang	3	7^{7}	7
5	(United States) Pete Sampras	6	6^{5}	5
4	(United States) Jay Berger	3	6	6
(Switzerland) Jakob Hlasek	6	2	2

Final
7	(United States) Michael Chang	4	6	7^{7}
4	(United States) Jay Berger	6	3	6^{2}

==== Doubles ====
Semifinals
1	(Canada) Grant Connell (Canada) Glenn Michibata	2	6	2
(Australia) Broderick Dyke (Sweden) Peter Lundgren	6	4	6
(Australia) Peter Doohan (Australia) Laurie Warder	3	6
(United States) Paul Annacone (United States) David Wheaton	6	7

Final
(Australia) Broderick Dyke (Sweden) Peter Lundgren	1	6
(United States) Paul Annacone (United States) David Wheaton	6	7

=== Cincinnati ===
Tournament name	Thriftway ATP Championships
Dates	August 6 – 12
Surface	Hard (outdoors)
Location	Mason, Ohio, United States

==== Singles ====
Quarterfinals
1	(Sweden) Stefan Edberg	3	6	6
7	(United States) Michael Chang	6	3	4
WC/3	(Ecuador) Andrés Gómez	6	6
11	(United States) Jim Courier	1	4
(Switzerland) Jakob Hlasek	6	1	5
4	(United States) Brad Gilbert	2	6	7
(United States) Scott Davis	4	6	7^{10}
15	(Australia) Richard Fromberg	6	4	6^{8}

Semifinals
1	(Sweden) Stefan Edberg	7	6
WC/3	(Ecuador) Andrés Gómez	5	3
4	(United States) Brad Gilbert	6	6
(United States) Scott Davis	3	4

Final
1	(Sweden) Stefan Edberg	6	6
4	(United States) Brad Gilbert	1	1

==== Doubles ====
Semifinals
7	(Australia) Darren Cahill (Australia) Mark Kratzmann	7^{7}	7
5	(France) Guy Forget (Switzerland) Jakob Hlasek	6^{3}	5
(United Kingdom) Neil Broad (South Africa) Gary Muller	6	6
2	(United States) Rick Leach (United States) Jim Pugh	3	4

Final
7	(Australia) Darren Cahill (Australia) Mark Kratzmann	7^{10}	6
(United Kingdom) Neil Broad (South Africa) Gary Muller	6^{8}	2

=== Stockholm ===
Tournament name	Stockholm Open
Dates	October 22 – 28
Surface	Carpet (indoors)
Location	Stockholm, Sweden

==== Singles ====
Quarterfinals
1	(Sweden) Stefan Edberg	6	3	6
7	(United States) Brad Gilbert	4	6	1
WC	(Sweden) Nicklas Kulti	2	1
(Soviet Union) Alexander Volkov	6	6
(United States) David Wheaton	6^{3}	7	4
4	(United States) Pete Sampras	7^{7}	5	6
9	(Socialist Federal Republic of Yugoslavia) Goran Ivanišević	4	2
2	(Germany) Boris Becker	6	6

Semifinals
1	(Sweden) Stefan Edberg	7^{7}	6
(Soviet Union) Alexander Volkov	6^{4}	2
4	(United States) Pete Sampras	4	4
2	(Germany) Boris Becker	6	6

Final
1	(Sweden) Stefan Edberg	4	0	3
2	(Germany) Boris Becker	6	6	6

==== Doubles ====
Semifinals
1	(France) Guy Forget (Switzerland) Jakob Hlasek	4	7^{7}	6
4	(United States) Scott Davis (United States) David Pate	6	6^{2}	4
3	(Canada) Grant Connell (Canada) Glenn Michibata	4	6^{5}
(Australia) John Fitzgerald (Sweden) Anders Järryd	6	7^{7}

Final
1	(France) Guy Forget (Switzerland) Jakob Hlasek	6	6
(Australia) John Fitzgerald (Sweden) Anders Järryd	4	2

=== Paris ===
Tournament name	Paris Open
Dates	October 29 – November 4
Surface	Carpet (indoors)
Location	Paris, France

==== Singles ====
Quarterfinals
1	(Sweden) Stefan Edberg	6	6
(Switzerland) Jakob Hlasek	3	4
Q	(France) Guillaume Raoux	6	1	3
(Spain) Sergi Bruguera	4	6	6
6	(Spain) Emilio Sánchez	5	4
14	(Sweden) Jonas Svensson	7	6
Q	(Germany) Michael Stich	1	2
2	(Germany) Boris Becker	6	6

Semifinals
1	(Sweden) Stefan Edberg	6	6
(Spain) Sergi Bruguera	3	3
14	(Sweden) Jonas Svensson	6	6^{5}	1
2	(Germany) Boris Becker	4	7^{7}	6

Final
1	(Sweden) Stefan Edberg	3
2	(Germany) Boris Becker	3^{r}

==== Doubles ====
Semifinals
7	(Mexico) Jorge Lozano (United States) Todd Witsken	4	5
6	(United States) Scott Davis (United States) David Pate	6	7
(United Kingdom) Neil Broad (South Africa) Gary Muller	3	2
8	(Australia) Darren Cahill (Australia) Mark Kratzmann	6	6

Final
6	(United States) Scott Davis (United States) David Pate	5	6	6
8	(Australia) Darren Cahill (Australia) Mark Kratzmann	7	3	4

== Titles won by player ==
=== Singles ===
#	Player	IN	MI	MO	HA	RO	CA	CI	ST	PA	#	Winning span
1.	(Sweden) Stefan Edberg	1	-	-	-	-	-	1	-	1	3	1990
2.	(United States) Andre Agassi	-	1	-	-	-	-	-	-	-	1	1990
=	(Spain) Juan Aguilera	-	-	-	1	-	-	-	-	-	1	1990
=	(Germany) Boris Becker	-	-	-	-	-	-	-	1	-	1	1990
=	(United States) Michael Chang	-	-	-	-	-	1	-	-	-	1	1990
=	(Soviet Union) Andrei Chesnokov	-	-	1	-	-	-	-	-	-	1	1990
=	(Austria) Thomas Muster	-	-	-	-	1	-	-	-	-	1	1990

== See also ==
- ATP Tour Masters 1000
- 1990 ATP Tour
- 1990 WTA Tier I Series
- 1990 WTA Tour
