= 1990 WTA Tier I Series =

Women's professional tennis tour

Details
- Duration: February 12 – August 5
- Edition: 1st
- Tournaments: 6

Achievements (singles)
- Most titles: (Socialist Federal Republic of Yugoslavia) Monica Seles (3)
- Most finals: (Socialist Federal Republic of Yugoslavia) Monica Seles (3)

The WTA Tier I events are part of the elite tour for professional women's tennis organised by the WTA called the WTA Tour.

== Tournaments ==
Tournament	Country	Location	Surface	Date	Prize money
Virginia Slims of Chicago	United States	Chicago	Carpet (i)	Feb 12 –18	$500,000
Lipton International Players Championships	United States	Key Biscayne	Hard	Mar 19 – 24	$750,000
Family Circle Cup	United States	Hilton Head Island	Clay	Apr 2 – 8	$500,000
Peugeot Italian Open	Italy	Rome	Clay	May 7 – 13	$500,000
Lufthansa Cup German Open	West Germany	West Berlin	Clay	May 14 – 20	$500,000
Canadian Open	Canada	Montreal	Hard	Jul 30 – Aug 5	$500,000

== Results ==
* First-time champion

Tournament	Singles champions	Runners-up	Score	Doubles champions	Runners-up	Score
Chicago Open Singles – Doubles	(United States) Martina Navratilova*	(Switzerland) Manuela Maleeva	6–3, 6–2	(United States) Martina Navratilova* (United States) Anne Smith*	(Spain) Arantxa Sánchez Vicario (France) Nathalie Tauziat	6–7^{(9–11)}, 6–4, 6–3
Miami Open Singles – Doubles	(Socialist Federal Republic of Yugoslavia) Monica Seles*	(Austria) Judith Wiesner	6–1, 6–2	(Czechoslovakia) Jana Novotná* (Czechoslovakia) Helena Suková*	(United States) Betsy Nagelsen (United States) Robin White	6–4, 6–3
Hilton Head Open Singles – Doubles	(United States) Martina Navratilova	(United States) Jennifer Capriati	6–2, 6–4	(United States) Martina Navratilova	(Argentina) Mercedes Paz (Soviet Union) Natasha Zvereva	6–2, 6–1
Hilton Head Open Singles – Doubles	(United States) Martina Navratilova	(United States) Jennifer Capriati	6–2, 6–4	(Spain) Arantxa Sánchez Vicario*	(Argentina) Mercedes Paz (Soviet Union) Natasha Zvereva	6–2, 6–1
Italian Open Singles – Doubles	(Socialist Federal Republic of Yugoslavia) Monica Seles	(United States) Martina Navratilova	6–1, 6–1	(Canada) Helen Kelesi* (Socialist Federal Republic of Yugoslavia) Monica Seles*	(Italy) Laura Garrone (Italy) Laura Golarsa	6–3, 6–4
German Open Singles – Doubles	(Socialist Federal Republic of Yugoslavia) Monica Seles	(West Germany) Steffi Graf	6–4, 6–3	(Australia) Nicole Provis* (South Africa) Elna Reinach*	(Australia) Hana Mandlíková (Czechoslovakia) Jana Novotná	6–2, 6–1
Canadian Open Singles – Doubles	(Germany) Steffi Graf*	(Bulgaria) Katerina Maleeva	6–1, 6–7^{(6–8)}, 6–3	(United States) Betsy Nagelsen* (Argentina) Gabriela Sabatini*	(Canada) Helen Kelesi (Italy) Raffaella Reggi	3–6, 6–2, 6–2

== See also ==
- WTA Tier I events
- 1990 WTA Tour
- 1990 ATP Championship Series, Single Week
- 1990 ATP Tour
