= 1997 Zurich Open =

- Date: October 12 – October 19
- Edition: 14th
- Category: Tier I
- Surface: Hard / Indoor
- Location: Zürich, Switzerland
- Venue: Hallenstadion

Champions

Singles
- (United States) Lindsay Davenport

Doubles
- (Switzerland) Martina Hingis / (Spain) Arantxa Sánchez Vicario
← 1996 ·	Zurich Open	· 1998 →

The 1997 Zurich Open was a women's tennis tournament played on indoor hard courts at the Hallenstadion in Zürich in Switzerland. It was part of Tier I of the 1997 WTA Tour. It was the 14th edition of the tournament and was held from October 12 through October 19, 1997.

== Champions ==
=== Singles ===
(United States) Lindsay Davenport defeated (France) Nathalie Tauziat 7–6, 7–5

- It was Davenport's 11th title of the year and the 29th of her career.

=== Doubles ===
(Switzerland) Martina Hingis / (Spain) Arantxa Sánchez Vicario defeated (Latvia) Larisa Savchenko / (Czech Republic) Helena Suková 4–6, 6–4, 6–1

- It was Hingis' 19th title of the year and the 25th of her career. It was Sánchez Vicario's 6th title of the year and the 79th of her career.
