= 1990 Monte Carlo Open – Singles =

Singles
- 1990 Monte Carlo Open

Final
- Champion: (Soviet Union) Andrei Chesnokov
- Runner-up: (Austria) Thomas Muster
- Score: 7–5, 6–3, 6–3

Details
- Draw: 56 (6Q / 4WC)
- Seeds: 16

Events
Singles	Doubles
- Monte Carlo Open

Andrei Chesnokov defeated Thomas Muster in the final, 7–5, 6–3, 6–3 to win the singles tennis title at the 1990 Monte Carlo Open.

Alberto Mancini was the defending champion, but lost in the second round to Henri Leconte.

== Seeds ==
The top eight seeds received a bye to the second round.

1. (Sweden) Stefan Edberg (third round)
2. (West Germany) Boris Becker (quarterfinals)
3. (United States) ~~Andre Agassi~~ (withdrew)
4. (United States) Aaron Krickstein (second round)
5. (United States) Jay Berger (second round)
6. (Ecuador) Andrés Gómez (third round)
7. (Spain) Emilio Sánchez (semifinals)
8. (Argentina) Martín Jaite (second round)
9. (United States) Jim Courier (third round)
10. (West Germany) Carl-Uwe Steeb (first round)
11. (Argentina) Alberto Mancini (second round)
12. (Soviet Union) Andrei Chesnokov (champion)
13. (Argentina) Guillermo Pérez Roldán (second round)
14. (Austria) Horst Skoff (quarterfinals)
15. (Sweden) Magnus Gustafsson (first round)
16. (Spain) Sergi Bruguera (second round)

== Draw ==
Key

- Q = Qualifier
- WC = Wild card
- LL = Lucky loser
- Alt = Alternate
- ITF = ITF entry
- PR = Protected ranking
- SR = Special ranking
- SE = Special exempt
- JE = Junior exempt
- JR = Junior Accelerator Programme entrant
- CO = College Accelerator Programme entrant
- NG = Next Gen Accelerator Program entrant
- w/o = Walkover
- r = Retired
- d = Defaulted

=== Finals ===
Semifinals
(Austria) Thomas Muster	6	6
WC	(France) Henri Leconte	2	3
12	(Soviet Union) Andrei Chesnokov	4	6	7^{7}
7	(Spain) Emilio Sánchez	6	1	6^{2}

Final
(Austria) Thomas Muster	5	3	3
12	(Soviet Union) Andrei Chesnokov	7	6	6

=== Top half ===
==== Section 1 ====
First round
(United States) J Arias	6	6
(South Africa) G Muller	1	3
(Spain) J Aguilera	6	6
(Italy) D Nargiso	1	3
(France) J-P Fleurian	4	4
16	(Spain) S Bruguera	6	6
9	(United States) J Courier	6	4	6
(West Germany) M Stich	3	6	4
Q	(Sweden) C Bergström	6	2	4
(Socialist Federal Republic of Yugoslavia) G Ivanišević	4	6	6
(Austria) T Muster	6	6
(Uruguay) M Filippini	2	2

Second round
1	(Sweden) S Edberg	7^{7}	6
(United States) J Arias	6^{5}	3
(Spain) J Aguilera	6^{9}	6
16	(Spain) S Bruguera	7^{11}	4	r
9	(United States) J Courier	6	6
(Socialist Federal Republic of Yugoslavia) G Ivanišević	3	1
(Austria) T Muster	6	6
8	(Argentina) M Jaite	3	2

Third round
1	(Sweden) S Edberg	6^{4}	6^{6}
(Spain) J Aguilera	7^{7}	7^{8}
9	(United States) J Courier	4	4
(Austria) T Muster	6	6

Quarterfinals
(Spain) J Aguilera	3	4
(Austria) T Muster	6	6

==== Section 2 ====
First round
(Italy) P Canè	6^{3}	5
(Spain) J Arrese	7^{7}	6
(Czechoslovakia) K Nováček	6	6
(Brazil) L Mattar	4	1
(Sweden) N Kroon	0	4
14	(Austria) H Skoff	6	6
11	(Argentina) A Mancini	6	6
(South Africa) C van Rensburg	2	4
WC	(France) H Leconte	6	6
(United States) T Witsken	1	4
(Spain) J Sánchez	6	6
WC	(France) F Santoro	2	4

Second round
4	(United States) A Krickstein	5	2
(Spain) J Arrese	7	6
(Czechoslovakia) K Nováček	3	7^{10}	4
14	(Austria) H Skoff	6	6^{8}	6
11	(Argentina) A Mancini	4	4
WC	(France) H Leconte	6	6
(Spain) J Sánchez	6^{1}	4
6	(Ecuador) A Gómez	7^{7}	6

Third round
(Spain) J Arrese	7^{7}	4	5
14	(Austria) H Skoff	6^{3}	6	7
WC	(France) H Leconte	6	6
6	(Ecuador) A Gómez	3	4

Quarterfinals
14	(Austria) H Skoff	2	7^{7}	4
WC	(France) H Leconte	6	6^{3}	6

=== Bottom half ===
==== Section 3 ====
First round
Q	(Sweden) L Jönsson	3	1
(Peru) J Yzaga	6	6
(Switzerland) J Hlasek	3	1
(Spain) T Carbonell	6	6
(Socialist Federal Republic of Yugoslavia) G Prpić	5	3
12	(Soviet Union) A Chesnokov	7	6
13	(Argentina) G Pérez Roldán	6	6
LL	(Uruguay) D Pérez	2	3
WC	(Switzerland) M Rosset	6	6
Q	(Chile) S Cortés	4	4
(Sweden) J Gunnarsson	0	0^{r}
Q	(Sweden) D Engel	6	3

Second round
5	(United States) J Berger	6	4	1
(Peru) J Yzaga	4	6	6
(Spain) T Carbonell	1^{r}
12	(Soviet Union) A Chesnokov	4
13	(Argentina) G Pérez Roldán	1	6^{2}
WC	(Switzerland) M Rosset	6	7^{7}
Q	(Sweden) D Engel	7	6
Q	(Argentina) G Markus	5	4

Third round
(Peru) J Yzaga	2	1
12	(Soviet Union) A Chesnokov	6	6
WC	(Switzerland) M Rosset	6	6
Q	(Sweden) D Engel	0	4

Quarterfinals
12	(Soviet Union) A Chesnokov	6	6
WC	(Switzerland) M Rosset	3	2

==== Section 4 ====
First round
Q	(Czechoslovakia) M Vajda	6	6
(Czechoslovakia) M Střelba	4	2
(Netherlands) P Haarhuis	3	5
WC	(France) G Forget	6	7
(Sweden) J Svensson	7^{7}	6
10	(West Germany) C-U Steeb	6^{5}	3
15	(Sweden) M Gustafsson	2	2
(Haiti) R Agénor	6	6
(Czechoslovakia) P Korda	6	3	6
(France) Y Noah	1	6	2
(Czechoslovakia) M Šrejber	1	1
Q	(France) C Pioline	6	6

Second round
7	(Spain) E Sánchez	6	6
Q	(Czechoslovakia) M Vajda	1	1
WC	(France) G Forget	6	5	6
(Sweden) J Svensson	4	7	1
15	(Haiti) R Agénor	6	6
(Czechoslovakia) P Korda	3	2
Q	(France) C Pioline	5	4
2	(West Germany) B Becker	7	6

Third round
7	(Spain) E Sánchez	6	6
WC	(France) G Forget	2	2
(Haiti) R Agénor	2	6	4
2	(West Germany) B Becker	6	4	6

Quarterfinals
7	(Spain) E Sánchez	4	7	7^{7}
2	(West Germany) B Becker	6	5	6^{3}
