= 1990 Monte Carlo Open =

- Date: 23–29 April
- Edition: 84th
- Category: ATP Championship Series, Single-Week
- Draw: 56S / 28D
- Prize money: $750,000
- Surface: Clay / outdoor
- Location: Roquebrune-Cap-Martin, France
- Venue: Monte Carlo Country Club

Champions

Singles
- (Soviet Union) Andrei Chesnokov

Doubles
- (Czechoslovakia) Petr Korda / (Czechoslovakia) Tomáš Šmíd
- Monte Carlo Open

The 1990 Monte Carlo Open, also known by its sponsored name Volvo Monte Carlo Open, was a men's tennis tournament played on outdoor clay courts. It was the 84th edition of the Monte Carlo Open, and was part of the ATP Championship Series, Single-Week category of the 1990 ATP Tour. It took place at the Monte Carlo Country Club in Roquebrune-Cap-Martin, France, near Monte Carlo, Monaco, 23 April until 29 April 1990. The men's field was headlined by Stefan Edberg and Boris Becker. Andrei Chesnokov, who was seeded 12th, won the singles title.

== Finals ==
=== Singles ===
(Soviet Union) Andrei Chesnokov defeated (Austria) Thomas Muster 7–5, 6–3, 6–3

- It was Chesnokov's 1st singles title of the year and his 5th overall. It was his 1st Masters title.

=== Doubles ===
(Czechoslovakia) Petr Korda / (Czechoslovakia) Tomáš Šmíd defeated (Ecuador) Andrés Gómez / (Spain) Javier Sánchez 6–4, 7–6
