= 1990 Italian Open (tennis) =

- Date: 7–13 May (women); 14–21 May (men)
- Edition: 47th
- Prize money: $1,002,000 (men) $500,000 (women)
- Surface: Clay / outdoor
- Location: Rome, Italy
- Venue: Foro Italico

Champions

Men's singles
- (Austria) Thomas Muster

Women's singles
- (Socialist Federal Republic of Yugoslavia) Monica Seles

Men's doubles
- (Spain) Sergio Casal / (Spain) Emilio Sánchez

Women's doubles
- (Canada) Helen Kelesi / (Socialist Federal Republic of Yugoslavia) Monica Seles
- Italian Open

The 1990 Italian Open (known as the Peugeot Italian Open for sponsorship reasons) was a tennis tournament played on outdoor clay courts. It was the 47th edition of the Italian Open, and was part of the ATP Championship Series, Single Week category of the 1990 ATP Tour, and of the Tier I Series of the 1990 WTA Tour. Both the men's and the women's events were held at the Foro Italico in Rome, Italy. The women's tournament was played from 7 May through 13 May 1990, and the men's tournament was played from 13 May through 21 May 1990. Thomas Muster and Monica Seles won the singles titles.

== Finals ==
=== Men's singles ===
(Austria) Thomas Muster defeated (Soviet Union) Andrei Chesnokov 6–1, 6–3, 6–1

- It was Muster's 3rd title of the year and his 8th overall. It was his 1st career Masters title.

=== Women's singles ===
(Socialist Federal Republic of Yugoslavia) Monica Seles defeated (United States) Martina Navratilova 6–1, 6–1

- It was Seles' 4th title of the year and her 5th overall. It was her 1st Tier I title.

=== Men's doubles ===
(Spain) Sergio Casal / (Spain) Emilio Sánchez defeated (United States) Jim Courier / (United States) Martin Davis 7–6, 7–5

=== Women's doubles ===
(Canada) Helen Kelesi / (Socialist Federal Republic of Yugoslavia) Monica Seles defeated (Italy) Laura Garrone / (Italy) Laura Golarsa 6–3, 6–4
