= 1990 Canadian Open – Women's singles =

Tennis tournament

Women's singles
- 1990 Canadian Open

Final
- Champion: (West Germany) Steffi Graf
- Runner-up: (Bulgaria) Katerina Maleeva
- Score: 6–1, 6–7, 6–3

Details
- Draw: 56 (8Q)
- Seeds: 16

Events
| Singles | men | women |
| Doubles | men | women |
- Canada Open

Steffi Graf defeated Katerina Maleeva in the final, 6–1, 6–7, 6–3 to win the women's singles tennis title at the 1990 Canadian Open.

Martina Navratilova was the reigning champion, but chose not to participate.

== Seeds ==
The top eight seeds received a bye to the second round.

1. (West Germany) Steffi Graf (champion)
2. (Argentina) Gabriela Sabatini (semifinal)
3. (Bulgaria) Katerina Maleeva (final)
4. (Switzerland) Manuela Maleeva-Fragniere (quarterfinal)
5. (Soviet Union) Natalia Zvereva (quarterfinal)
6. (United States) Jennifer Capriati (quarterfinal)
7. (France) Nathalie Tauziat (semifinal)
8. (Austria) Barbara Paulus (third round)
9. (Canada) Helen Kelesi (third round)
10. (Italy) Raffaella Reggi (third round)
11. (West Germany) Claudia Porwik (second round)
12. (Netherlands) Manon Bollegraf (second round)
13. (Soviet Union) Larisa Savchenko (second round)
14. (France) Julie Halard (first round)
15. (United States) Lori McNeil (third round)
16. (Czechoslovakia) Regina Rajchrtová (first round)

== Draw ==
Key

- Q = Qualifier
- WC = Wild card
- LL = Lucky loser
- Alt = Alternate
- ITF = ITF entry
- PR = Protected ranking
- SR = Special ranking
- SE = Special exempt
- JE = Junior exempt
- JR = Junior Accelerator Programme entrant
- CO = College Accelerator Programme entrant
- NG = Next Gen Accelerator Program entrant
- w/o = Walkover
- r = Retired
- d = Defaulted

=== Finals ===
Quarterfinals
1 | (West Germany) Steffi Graf | 6 | 6
5 | (Soviet Union) Natalia Zvereva | 0 | 4
4 | (Switzerland) Manuela Maleeva-Fragniere | 3 | 2
7 | (France) Nathalie Tauziat | 6 | 6
(Japan) Naoko Sawamatsu | 7 | 2 | 4
3 | (Bulgaria) Katerina Maleeva | 6 | 6 | 6
6 | (United States) Jennifer Capriati | 6 | 1 | 4
2 | (Argentina) Gabriela Sabatini | 3 | 6 | 6

Semifinals
1 | (West Germany) Steffi Graf | 6 | 6
7 | (France) Nathalie Tauziat | 2 | 2
3 | (Bulgaria) Katerina Maleeva | 6 | 6
2 | (Argentina) Gabriela Sabatini | 3 | 4

Final
1 | (West Germany) Steffi Graf | 6 | 6 | 6
3 | (Bulgaria) Katerina Maleeva | 1 | 7 | 3

=== Top half ===
==== Section 1 ====
First round
LL | (United States) L Spadea | 1 | 1
(United Kingdom) M Javer | 6 | 6
LL | (Poland) R Baranski | 6 | 6
(Argentina) B Fulco | 4 | 2
(Canada) R Simpson | 1 | 1
15 | (United States) L McNeil | 6 | 6
13 | (Soviet Union) L Savchenko | 0 | 6 | 6
(United States) H Cioffi | 6 | 1 | 0
(United Kingdom) J Durie | 7 | 6
(United States) S Martin | 6 | 3
(Japan) N Miyagi | 4 | 7 | 2
(United Kingdom) S Loosemore | 6 | 6 | 6

Second round
1 | (West Germany) S Graf | 6 | 6
(United Kingdom) M Javer | 1 | 2
LL | (Poland) R Baranski | 4 | 0
15 | (United States) L McNeil | 6 | 6
13 | (Soviet Union) L Savchenko | 2 | 2^{r}
(United Kingdom) J Durie | 6 | 4
(United Kingdom) S Loosemore
5 | (Soviet Union) N Zvereva | w/o

Third round
1 | (West Germany) S Graf | 7 | 6
15 | (United States) L McNeil | 5 | 3
(United Kingdom) J Durie | 4 | 2
5 | (Soviet Union) N Zvereva | 6 | 6

Quarterfinals
1 | (West Germany) Steffi Graf | 6 | 6
5 | (Soviet Union) Natalia Zvereva | 0 | 4

==== Section 2 ====
First round
(Bulgaria) M Maleeva | 6 | 6
Q | (United States) K Jordan | 4 | 3
Q | (Israel) Y Segal | 3 | 0
(Australia) A Minter | 6 | 6
(United States) C Cunningham | 6 | 3
9 | (Canada) H Kelesi | 7 | 6
11 | (West Germany) C Porwik | 6 | 7
(United States) E Burgin | 2 | 6
(Brazil) C Chabalgoity | 0 | 7 | 0
(Hong Kong) P Hy | 6 | 5 | 6
(Australia) E Smylie | 1 | 6 | 6
(United States) B Bowes | 6 | 2 | 7

Second round
4 | (Switzerland) M Maleeva-Fragniere | 4
(Bulgaria) M Maleeva | 1^{r}
(Australia) A Minter | 4 | 4
9 | (Canada) H Kelesi | 6 | 6
11 | (West Germany) C Porwik | 4 | 6 | 6
(Hong Kong) P Hy | 6 | 4 | 7
(United States) B Bowes | 3 | 6 | 2
7 | (France) N Tauziat | 6 | 2 | 6

Third round
4 | (Switzerland) M Maleeva-Fragniere | 6 | 6
9 | (Canada) H Kelesi | 1 | 0
(Hong Kong) P Hy | 3 | 2
7 | (France) N Tauziat | 6 | 6

Quarterfinals
4 | (Switzerland) Manuela Maleeva-Fragniere | 3 | 2
7 | (France) Nathalie Tauziat | 6 | 6

=== Bottom half ===
==== Section 1 ====
First round
(Sweden) M Strandlund | 3 | 1
(United States) T Phelps | 6 | 6
Q | (Australia) L Field | 6 | 7
(United States) A Leand | 3 | 5
(Japan) N Sawamatsu | 6 | 6
14 | (France) J Halard | 3 | 3
16 | (Czechoslovakia) R Rajchrtová | 7 | 4 | 5
Q | (United Kingdom) S Gomer | 6 | 6 | 7
Q | (New Zealand) J Richardson | 6 | 6
Q | (United States) L Allen | 0 | 4
(New Zealand) B Cordwell | 6 | 3 | 6
WC | (Canada) J Hetherington | 2 | 6 | 4

Second round
8 | (Austria) B Paulus | 6 | 6 | 6
(United States) T Phelps | 7 | 4 | 4
Q | (United States) L Field | 1 | 3
(Japan) N Sawamatsu | 6 | 6
Q | (United Kingdom) S Gomer | 5 | 2
Q | (New Zealand) J Richardson | 7 | 6
(New Zealand) B Cordwell | 0 | 2
3 | (Bulgaria) K Maleeva | 6 | 6

Third round
8 | (Austria) B Paulus | 2 | 6 | 3
(Japan) N Sawamatsu | 6 | 1 | 6
Q | (New Zealand) J Richardson | 0 | 0
3 | (Bulgaria) K Maleeva | 6 | 6

Quarterfinals
(Japan) Naoko Sawamatsu | 7 | 2 | 4
3 | (Bulgaria) Katerina Maleeva | 6 | 6 | 6

==== Section 2 ====
First round
Q | (United States) L Green | 6 | 6
WC | (Poland) M Mroz | 4 | 0
(United States) C Benjamin | 2 | 6 | 7
(United States) B Nagelsen | 6 | 3 | 6
(United States) A Grossman | 7 | 4 | 4
12 | (Netherlands) M Bollegraf | 5 | 6 | 6
10 | (Italy) R Reggi | 6 | 6
(France) I Demongeot | 4 | 3
(United States) M Werdel | 7 | 6
WC | (Canada) S Italiano | 5 | 2
(United States) K Rinaldi | 6 | 6
Q | (New Zealand) C Toleafoa | 4 | 1

Second round
6 | (United States) J Capriati | 6 | 6
Q | (United States) L Green | 4 | 0
(United States) C Benjamin | 4
12 | (Netherlands) M Bollegraf | 2^{r}
10 | (Italy) R Reggi | 6 | 6
(United States) M Werdel | 1 | 0
(United States) K Rinaldi | 0 | 3
2 | (Argentina) G Sabatini | 6 | 6

Third round
6 | (United States) J Capriati | 6 | 6
(United States) C Benjamin | 3 | 2
10 | (Italy) R Reggi | 1 | 0
2 | (Argentina) G Sabatini | 6 | 6

Quarterfinals
6 | (United States) Jennifer Capriati | 6 | 1 | 4
2 | (Argentina) Gabriela Sabatini | 3 | 6 | 6
