= 1990 Canadian Open – Men's singles =

Men's singles
- 1990 Canadian Open

Final
- Champion: (United States) Michael Chang
- Runner-up: (United States) Jay Berger
- Score: 4–6, 6–3, 7–6^{(7–3)}

Details
- Draw: 56
- Seeds: 16

Events
Singles	men	women
Doubles	men	women
← 1989 ·	Canadian Open	· 1991 →

Michael Chang defeated Jay Berger in the final, 4–6, 6–3, 7–6^{(7–3)} to win the men's singles tennis title at the 1990 Canadian Open. With the win, Chang became the youngest Masters champion in history.

Ivan Lendl was the three-time reigning champion, but did not compete that year.

== Seeds ==
A champion seed is indicated in bold text while text in italics indicates the round in which that seed was eliminated. The top eight seeds received a bye into the second round.

1. (United States) Andre Agassi (quarterfinals)
2. (United States) Brad Gilbert (second round)
3. (United States) John McEnroe (quarterfinals)
4. (United States) Jay Berger (final)
5. (United States) Pete Sampras (semifinals)
6. (United States) Tim Mayotte (quarterfinals)
7. (United States) **Michael Chang (champion)**
8. (Czechoslovakia) Petr Korda (second round)
9. (United States) David Wheaton (third round)
10. (United States) Jim Grabb (second round)
11. (United States) Richey Reneberg (third round)
12. (United States) Kevin Curren (first round)
13. (Israel) Amos Mansdorf (third round)
14. (France) Jean-Philippe Fleurian (second round)
15. (Soviet Union) Alexander Volkov (first round)
16. (Australia) Mark Kratzmann (second round)

== Draw ==
=== Key ===
- Q = Qualifier
- WC = Wild card
- LL = Lucky loser
- Alt = Alternate
- SE = Special exempt
- PR = Protected ranking
- ITF = ITF entry
- JE = Junior exempt
- w/o = Walkover
- r = Retired
- d = Defaulted
- SR = Special ranking

=== Finals ===
Semifinals
7	(United States) **Michael Chang**	3	**7^{7}**	**7**
5	(United States) Pete Sampras	**6**	6^{5}	5
4	(United States) **Jay Berger**	3	**6**	**6**
(Switzerland) Jakob Hlasek	**6**	2	2

Final
7	(United States) **Michael Chang**	4	**6**	**7^{7}**
4	(United States) Jay Berger	**6**	3	6^{3}

=== Top half ===
==== Section 1 ====
First round
(Sweden) T Högstedt	4	2
(West Germany) **M Stich**	**6**	**6**
(Sweden) P Lundgren	6	2
(United States) **B Pearce**	**7**	**6**
(Australia) **D Cahill**	5	**7**	**6**
15	(Soviet Union) A Volkov	**7**	5	3
9	(United States) **D Wheaton**	**6**	**6**
(United States) M Washington	4	4
(United States) D Goldie	4	4
Q	(Mexico) **E Velez**	**6**	**6**
(United States) J Tarango	2	2
Q	(Australia) **B Dyke**	**6**	**6**

Second round
1	(United States) **A Agassi**	**6**	6	**6**
(West Germany) M Stich	3	**7**	3
(United States) B Pearce	4	4
(Australia) **D Cahill**	**6**	**6**
9	(United States) **D Wheaton**	**6**	**6**
Q	(Mexico) E Velez	2	4
Q	(Australia) B Dyke	2	3
7	(United States) **M Chang**	**6**	**6**

Third round
1	(United States) **A Agassi**	**6**	**6**
(Australia) D Cahill	2	4
9	(United States) D Wheaton	0	3
7	(United States) **M Chang**	**6**	**6**

Quarterfinals
1	(United States) A Agassi	**6**	5	5
7	(United States) **M Chang**	4	**7**	**7**

==== Section 2 ====
First round
(New Zealand) K Evernden	1	**6**	6
(Canada) **G Connell**	**6**	4	**7**
WC	(Australia) M Woodforde	**6**	3	0
(Australia) **J Stoltenberg**	4	**6**	**6**
(United States) B Shelton	6	**6**	1
13	(Israel) **A Mansdorf**	**7**	4	**6**
12	(United States) K Curren	5	**7**	4
(Canada) **A Sznajder**	**7**	6	**6**
Q	(Kenya) **P Wekesa**	**6**	6	**6**
Q	(Italy) G Pozzi	2	**7**	2
WC	(Canada) **M Wostenholme**	4	**6**	**6**
(United States) K Jones	**6**	2	4

Second round
3	(United States) **J McEnroe**	**7**	**6**
(Canada) G Connell	6	1
(Australia) J Stoltenberg	2	2
13	(Israel) **A Mansdorf**	**6**	**6**
(Canada) **A Sznajder**	**7**	**6**
Q	(Kenya) P Wekesa	6	3
WC	(Canada) M Wostenholme	3	2
5	(United States) **P Sampras**	**6**	**6**

Third round
3	(United States) **J McEnroe**	**6**	**6**
13	(Israel) A Mansdorf	2	4
(Canada) A Sznajder	**6**	3	2
5	(United States) **P Sampras**	4	**6**	**6**

Quarterfinals
3	(United States) J McEnroe	6^{4}	**6**	3
5	(United States) **P Sampras**	**7^{7}**	4	**6**

=== Bottom half ===
==== Section 3 ====
First round
WC	(Canada) B Gyetko	4	4
Q	(United States) **C Garner**	**6**	**6**
(United States) **P Chamberlin**	**6**	**7**
(United States) J Rive	3	6
(Israel) G Bloom	**6**	2	1
11	(United States) **R Reneberg**	2	**6**	**6**
14	(France) **J-P Fleurian**	**7**	**6**
WC	(Canada) G Michibata	6	2
Q	(New Zealand) B Derlin	**6**	0	1
(United States) **D Rostagno**	2	**6**	**6**
(United States) **L Shiras**	**6**	**6**
(United States) P Annacone	1	4

Second round
6	(United States) **T Mayotte**	**6**	**6**
Q	(United States) C Garner	3	2
(United States) P Chamberlin	3	**6**	2
11	(United States) **R Reneberg**	**6**	2	**6**
14	(France) J-P Fleurian	2	2
(United States) **D Rostagno**	**6**	**6**
(United States) L Shiras	2	4
4	(United States) **J Berger**	**6**	**6**

Third round
6	(United States) **T Mayotte**	**6**	4	**6**
11	(United States) R Reneberg	3	**6**	3
(United States) D Rostagno	**6**	4	1
4	(United States) **J Berger**	4	**6**	**6**

Quarterfinals
6	(United States) T Mayotte	6^{2}	4
4	(United States) **J Berger**	**7^{7}**	**6**

==== Section 4 ====
First round
(United States) S Davis	3	2
(Switzerland) **J Hlasek**	**6**	**6**
Q	(Czechoslovakia) L Němeček	1	5
(United States) **J Arias**	**6**	**7**
(West Germany) U Riglewski	4	6
10	(United States) **J Grabb**	**6**	**7**
16	(Australia) **M Kratzmann**	3	**6**	**6**
(Australia) S Youl	**6**	4	3
WC	(Canada) C Pridham	6	4
(India) **R Krishnan**	**7**	**6**
(Czechoslovakia) M Šrejber	**6**	6	4
(United States) **T Witsken**	3	**7**	**6**

Second round
8	(Czechoslovakia) P Korda	**7**	4	4
(Switzerland) **J Hlasek**	5	**6**	**6**
(United States) **J Arias**	4
10	(United States) J Grabb	1^{r}
16	(Australia) M Kratzmann	**6**	5	2
(India) **R Krishnan**	2	**7**	**6**
(United States) **T Witsken**	**7**	4	**6**
2	(United States) B Gilbert	5	**6**	2

Third round
(Switzerland) **J Hlasek**	**7**	**6**
(United States) J Arias	5	1
(India) R Krishnan	4	4
(United States) **T Witsken**	**6**	**6**

Quarterfinals
(Switzerland) **J Hlasek**	**6**	**6**
(United States) T Witsken	4	2
