= 1990 Italian Open – Men's doubles =

Men's doubles
- 1990 Italian Open

Final
- Champions: (Spain) Sergio Casal (Spain) Emilio Sánchez
- Runners-up: (United States) Jim Courier (United States) Martin Davis
- Score: 7–6, 7–5

Details
- Draw: 32
- Seeds: 8

Events
Singles	men	women
Doubles	men	women
← 1989 ·	Italian Open	· 1991 →

Jim Courier and Pete Sampras were the defending champions, but Sampras did not participate this year. Courier partnered Martin Davis, losing in the final

Sergio Casal and Emilio Sánchez won the title, defeating Courier and Davis 7–6, 7–5 in the final.

== Seeds ==
1. (United States) Rick Leach / (United States) Jim Pugh (first round)
2. (United States) Jim Grabb / (United States) Patrick McEnroe (first round)
3. (Mexico) Jorge Lozano / (United States) Todd Witsken (quarterfinals)
4. (France) Guy Forget / (Switzerland) Jakob Hlasek (first round)
5. (Spain) Sergio Casal / (Spain) Emilio Sánchez (champions)
6. (Czechoslovakia) Petr Korda / (Czechoslovakia) Tomáš Šmíd (first round)
7. (Denmark) Michael Mortensen / (Netherlands) Tom Nijssen (first round)
8. (United States) Patrick Galbraith / (Australia) David Macpherson (first round)

== Draw ==
=== Key ===
- Q = Qualifier
- WC = Wild card
- LL = Lucky loser
- Alt = Alternate
- ITF = ITF entry
- PR = Protected ranking
- SR = Special ranking
- SE = Special exempt
- JE = Junior exempt
- JR = Junior Accelerator Programme entrant
- CO = College Accelerator Programme entrant
- NG = Next Gen Accelerator Program entrant
- w/o = Walkover
- r = Retired
- d = Defaulted

=== Finals ===
Semifinals
(Italy) Simone Colombo (Sweden) Nicklas Utgren	2	3
5	(Spain) Sergio Casal (Spain) Emilio Sánchez	6	6
(Australia) Broderick Dyke (Australia) Laurie Warder	3	4
(United States) Jim Courier (United States) Martin Davis	6	6

Final
5	(Spain) Sergio Casal (Spain) Emilio Sánchez	7	7
(United States) Jim Courier (United States) Martin Davis	6	5

=== Top half ===
First round
1	(United States) R Leach (United States) J Pugh	7	5	3
(Argentina) G Luza (Brazil) L Mattar	6	7	6
(Brazil) D Marcelino (Brazil) M Menezes	2	6
(Argentina) M Jaite (Brazil) C Motta	6	7
(United States) B Gilbert (Italy) D Nargiso	4	4
(Italy) S Colombo (Sweden) N Utgren	6	6
(Italy) O Camporese (Italy) P Canè	6	1	6
8	(United States) P Galbraith (Australia) D Macpherson	4	6	3
3	(Mexico) J Lozano (United States) T Witsken	6	4	6
(Peru) C di Laura (Uruguay) M Filippini	3	6	3
LL	(Italy) N Bruno (Italy) S Pescosolido	6	2	3
(Argentina) A Mancini (Argentina) G Pérez Roldán	1	6	6
(United States) T Pawsat (United States) G Van Emburgh	6	3	1
(South Africa) S Kruger (United States) R Reneberg	2	6	6
Q	(Italy) F Beraldo (Italy) A Gaudenzi	1	6	3
5	(Spain) S Casal (Spain) E Sánchez	6	2	6

Second round
(Argentina) G Luza (Brazil) L Mattar	6	3
(Argentina) M Jaite (Brazil) C Motta	7	6
(Italy) S Colombo (Sweden) N Utgren	w/o
(Italy) O Camporese (Italy) P Canè
3	(Mexico) J Lozano (United States) T Witsken	6	3	6
(Argentina) A Mancini (Argentina) G Pérez Roldán	4	6	2
(South Africa) S Kruger (United States) R Reneberg	3	3
5	(Spain) S Casal (Spain) E Sánchez	6	6

Quarterfinals
(Argentina) M Jaite (Brazil) C Motta	6	3
(Italy) S Colombo (Sweden) N Utgren	7	6
3	(Mexico) J Lozano (United States) T Witsken	3	4
5	(Spain) S Casal (Spain) E Sánchez	6	6

Semifinals
(Italy) S Colombo (Sweden) N Utgren	2	3
5	(Spain) S Casal (Spain) E Sánchez	6	6

=== Bottom half ===
First round
6	(Czechoslovakia) P Korda (Czechoslovakia) T Šmíd	4	5
(Australia) B Dyke (Australia) L Warder	6	7
(Iran) M Bahrami (France) J-P Fleurian	4	6	3
(Spain) T Carbonell (Spain) C Costa	6	3	6
(Czechoslovakia) T Anzari (Czechoslovakia) D Rikl	6	1	3
(Argentina) J Frana (Argentina) C Miniussi	4	6	6
(Netherlands) P Haarhuis (Netherlands) M Schapers	7	3	6
4	(France) G Forget (Switzerland) J Hlasek	6	6	3
7	(Denmark) M Mortensen (Netherlands) T Nijssen	3	2
(Czechoslovakia) K Nováček (Czechoslovakia) M Šrejber	6	6
(Czechoslovakia) J Čihák (Czechoslovakia) C Suk	3	6	6
(United States) C Beckman (United States) L Jensen	6	4	3
(United States) J Courier (United States) M Davis	6	3	6
Q	(Italy) C Caratti (Italy) F Mordegan	4	6	1
(Spain) J Sánchez (Peru) J Yzaga	6	6
2	(United States) J Grabb (United States) P McEnroe	4	3

Second round
(Australia) B Dyke (Australia) L Warder	6	3	6
(Spain) T Carbonell (Spain) C Costa	2	6	2
(Argentina) M Jaite (Argentina) C Miniussi	6	4	6
(Netherlands) P Haarhuis (Netherlands) M Schapers	3	6	4
(Czechoslovakia) K Nováček (Czechoslovakia) M Šrejber	1	5
(Czechoslovakia) J Čihák (Czechoslovakia) C Suk	6	7
(United States) J Courier (United States) M Davis	6	6
(Spain) J Sánchez (Peru) J Yzaga	1	1

Quarterfinals
(Australia) B Dyke (Australia) L Warder	6	6
(Argentina) J Frana (Argentina) C Miniussi	1	4
(Czechoslovakia) J Čihák (Czechoslovakia) C Suk	2	6
(United States) J Courier (United States) M Davis	6	7

Semifinals
(Australia) B Dyke (Australia) L Warder	3	4
(United States) J Courier (United States) M Davis	6	6
