= 1990 Canadian Open (tennis) =

- Date: July 23 – July 30 (men); July 30 – August 6 (women)
- Edition: 101st
- Surface: Hard / outdoor

Champions

Men's singles
- (United States) Michael Chang

Women's singles
- (West Germany) Steffi Graf

Men's doubles
- (United States) Paul Annacone / (United States) David Wheaton

Women's doubles
- (United States) Betsy Nagelsen / (Argentina) Gabriela Sabatini
- Canadian Open

The 1990 Canadian Open was a tennis tournament played on outdoor hard courts. It was the 101st edition of the Canada Masters and was part of the Championship Series, Single-Week category of the 1990 ATP Tour and of Tier I of the 1990 WTA Tour. The men's event took place at the National Tennis Centre in Toronto in Canada from July 23 through July 30, 1990, and the women's event at the du Maurier Stadium in Montreal in Canada from July 30 through August 6, 1990.

== Finals ==
=== Men's singles ===
(United States) Michael Chang defeated (United States) Jay Berger 4–6, 6–3, 7–6^{(7–3)}

- It was Chang's only title of the year and the 4th of his career. It was his only Masters title of the year and his 1st overall.

=== Women's singles ===
(West Germany) Steffi Graf defeated (Bulgaria) Katerina Maleeva 6–1, 6–7, 6–3

- It was Graf's 5th title of the year and the 58th of her career. It was her 1st Tier I title.

=== Men's doubles ===
(United States) Paul Annacone / (United States) David Wheaton defeated (Australia) Broderick Dyke / (Sweden) Peter Lundgren 6–1, 7–6

- It was Annacone's only title of the year and the 15th of his career. It was Wheaton's 2nd title of the year and the 2nd of his career.

=== Women's doubles ===
(United States) Betsy Nagelsen / (Argentina) Gabriela Sabatini defeated (Canada) Helen Kelesi / (Italy) Raffaella Reggi 3–6, 6–2, 6–2

- It was Nagelsen's only title of the year and the 22nd of her career. It was Sabatini's 2nd title of the year and the 24th of her career.
