= 1990 Monte Carlo Open – Doubles =

Doubles
- 1990 Monte Carlo Open

Final
- Champions: (Czechoslovakia) Petr Korda (Czechoslovakia) Tomáš Šmíd
- Runners-up: (Ecuador) Andrés Gómez (Spain) Javier Sánchez
- Score: 6–4, 7–6

Details
- Draw: 28
- Seeds: 8

Events
Singles	Doubles
- Monte Carlo Open

In the 1990 Monte Carlo Open doubles, Tomáš Šmíd and Mark Woodforde were the defending champions, but Woodforde did not participate this year. Šmíd partnered Petr Korda.

Korda and Šmíd won the title, defeating Andrés Gómez and Javier Sánchez 6–4, 7–6 in the final.

== Seeds ==
The top four seeded teams received byes into the second round.

1. (France) Guy Forget / (Switzerland) Jakob Hlasek (quarterfinals)
2. (Mexico) Jorge Lozano / (United States) Todd Witsken (quarterfinals)
3. (Spain) Sergio Casal / (Spain) Emilio Sánchez (second round)
4. (Ecuador) Andrés Gómez / (Spain) Javier Sánchez (final)
5. (Brazil) Cássio Motta / (Italy) Diego Nargiso (quarterfinals)
6. (Iran) Mansour Bahrami / (France) Éric Winogradsky (semifinals)
7. (South Africa) Gary Muller / (South Africa) Christo van Rensburg (first round)
8. (Czechoslovakia) Petr Korda / (Czechoslovakia) Tomáš Šmíd (champions)

== Draw ==
Key

- Q = Qualifier
- WC = Wild card
- LL = Lucky loser
- Alt = Alternate
- ITF = ITF entry
- PR = Protected ranking
- SR = Special ranking
- SE = Special exempt
- JE = Junior exempt
- JR = Junior Accelerator Programme entrant
- CO = College Accelerator Programme entrant
- NG = Next Gen Accelerator Program entrant
- w/o = Walkover
- r = Retired
- d = Defaulted

=== Finals ===
Semifinals
8	(Czechoslovakia) Petr Korda (Czechoslovakia) Tomáš Šmíd	6	7
6	(Iran) Mansour Bahrami (France) Éric Winogradsky	4	6
4	(Ecuador) Andrés Gómez (Spain) Javier Sánchez	5	6	7
(Netherlands) Paul Haarhuis (Netherlands) Michiel Schapers	7	3	6

Final
8	(Czechoslovakia) Petr Korda (Czechoslovakia) Tomáš Šmíd	6	7
4	(Ecuador) Andrés Gómez (Spain) Javier Sánchez	4	6

=== Top half ===
First round
(United States) P Galbraith (Australia) D Macpherson	6	6
Q	(Spain) J Arrese (Czechoslovakia) M Vajda	1	2
WC	(France) H Leconte (France) Y Noah	6	6
(Sweden) J Gunnarsson (Denmark) M Mortensen	0	2
(Argentina) M Jaite (Uruguay) D Pérez	3	4
8	(Czechoslovakia) P Korda (Czechoslovakia) T Šmíd	6	6
(Czechoslovakia) K Nováček (Czechoslovakia) M Šrejber	7	6
(Italy) M Cierro (Italy) S Colombo	6	2
(Spain) T Carbonell (Socialist Federal Republic of Yugoslavia) G Ivanišević	6	3
WC	(Sweden) M Gustafsson (Sweden) J Svensson	7	6
(West Germany) U Riglewski (West Germany) M Stich	5	6	3
6	(Iran) M Bahrami (France) E Winogradsky	7	4	6

Second round
1	(France) G Forget (Switzerland) J Hlasek	5	6	6
(United States) P Galbraith (Australia) D Macpherson	7	4	4
WC	(France) H Leconte (France) Y Noah	7	6	4
8	(Czechoslovakia) P Korda (Czechoslovakia) T Šmíd	6	7	6
3	(Spain) S Casal (Spain) E Sánchez	3	4
(Czechoslovakia) K Nováček (Czechoslovakia) M Šrejber	6	6
WC	(Sweden) M Gustafsson (Sweden) J Svensson	2	3
6	(Iran) M Bahrami (France) E Winogradsky	6	6

Quarterfinals
1	(France) G Forget (Switzerland) J Hlasek	4	4
8	(Czechoslovakia) P Korda (Czechoslovakia) T Šmíd	6	6
(Czechoslovakia) K Nováček (Czechoslovakia) M Šrejber	4	6	6
6	(Iran) M Bahrami (France) E Winogradsky	6	4	7

Semifinals
8	(Czechoslovakia) P Korda (Czechoslovakia) T Šmíd	6	7
6	(Iran) M Bahrami (France) E Winogradsky	4	6

=== Bottom half ===
First round
5	(Brazil) C Motta (Italy) D Nargiso	6	5	6
(Argentina) G Luza (Brazil) L Mattar	4	7	3
(Czechoslovakia) J Čihák (Czechoslovakia) C Suk	6	6
(Sweden) P Lundgren (Hungary) B Taróczy	3	3
(United States) C Beckman (United States) L Jensen	6	6
(Czechoslovakia) T Anzari (Czechoslovakia) D Rikl	2	1
7	(South Africa) G Muller (South Africa) C van Rensburg	1	6	2
(Netherlands) P Haarhuis (Netherlands) M Schapers	6	3	6
(Haiti) R Agénor (Austria) T Muster	2	1
(Peru) C di Laura (Peru) J Yzaga	6	6
Q	(Italy) C Caratti (Italy) F Mordegan	5	6	3
(Sweden) R Båthman (Sweden) N Utgren	7	4	6

Second round
5	(Brazil) C Motta (Italy) D Nargiso	5	6	7
(Czechoslovakia) J Čihák (Czechoslovakia) C Suk	7	4	6
(United States) C Beckman (United States) L Jensen	2	6	1
4	(Ecuador) A Gómez (Spain) J Sánchez	6	3	6
(Netherlands) P Haarhuis (Netherlands) M Schapers	6	2	6
(Peru) C di Laura (Peru) J Yzaga	2	6	3
(Sweden) R Båthman (Sweden) N Utgren	6	5
2	(Mexico) J Lozano (United States) T Witsken	7	7

Quarterfinals
5	(Brazil) C Motta (Italy) D Nargiso	2	1
4	(Ecuador) A Gómez (Spain) J Sánchez	6	6
(Netherlands) P Haarhuis (Netherlands) M Schapers	6	6
2	(Mexico) J Lozano (United States) T Witsken	1	4

Semifinals
4	(Ecuador) A Gómez (Spain) J Sánchez	5	6	7
(Netherlands) P Haarhuis (Netherlands) M Schapers	7	3	6
