= 1990 Italian Open – Women's singles =

Women's singles
- 1990 Italian Open

Final
- Champion: (Socialist Federal Republic of Yugoslavia) Monica Seles
- Runner-up: (United States) Martina Navratilova
- Score: 6–1, 6–1

Details
- Draw: 56 (8Q/2LL)
- Seeds: 16

Events
| Singles | men | women |
| Doubles | men | women |
| ← 1989 · | Italian Open | · 1991 → |

Monica Seles defeated Martina Navratilova in the final, 6–1, 6–1 to win the women's singles tennis title at the 1990 Italian Open. After dropping 4 games in her first set of the tournament, Seles would only drop 10 games during her last nine sets, dropping a total of just 14 games in her five matches.

Gabriela Sabatini was the two-time defending champion, but lost in the semifinals to Navratilova.

== Seeds ==
The first eight seeds received a bye to the second round.

1. (United States) Martina Navratilova (final)
2. (Socialist Federal Republic of Yugoslavia) Monica Seles (champion)
3. (Spain) Arantxa Sánchez Vicario (third round)
4. (Argentina) Gabriela Sabatini (semifinals)
5. (Switzerland) Manuela Maleeva (quarterfinals)
6. (Spain) Conchita Martínez (quarterfinals)
7. (France) Nathalie Tauziat (second round)
8. (Austria) Judith Wiesner (second round)
9. (Peru) Laura Gildemeister (second round)
10. (Italy) Raffaella Reggi (third round)
11. (Canada) Helen Kelesi (semifinals)
12. (United States) Jennifer Capriati (quarterfinals)
13. (Sweden) Catarina Lindqvist (quarterfinals)
14. (Italy) Sandra Cecchini (third round)
15. (Soviet Union) Leila Meskhi (second round)
16. (Switzerland) Cathy Caverzasio (third round)

== Draw ==
=== Key ===
- Q = Qualifier
- WC = Wild card
- LL = Lucky loser
- Alt = Alternate
- ITF = ITF entry
- PR = Protected ranking
- SR = Special ranking
- SE = Special exempt
- JE = Junior exempt
- JR = Junior Accelerator Programme entrant
- CO = College Accelerator Programme entrant
- NG = Next Gen Accelerator Program entrant
- w/o = Walkover
- r = Retired
- d = Defaulted

=== Finals ===
Quarterfinals
1 | (United States) Martina Navratilova | 6 | 6
6 | (Spain) Conchita Martínez | 2 | 0
4 | (Argentina) Gabriela Sabatini | 6 | 7
12 | (United States) Jennifer Capriati | 2 | 5
13 | (Sweden) Catarina Lindqvist | 4 | 3
11 | (Canada) Helen Kelesi | 6 | 6
5 | (Switzerland) Manuela Maleeva | 0 | 2
2 | (Socialist Federal Republic of Yugoslavia) Monica Seles | 6 | 6

Semifinals
1 | (United States) Martina Navratilova | 7^{7} | 7
4 | (Argentina) Gabriela Sabatini | 6^{4} | 5
11 | (Canada) Helen Kelesi | 1 | 2
2 | (Socialist Federal Republic of Yugoslavia) Monica Seles | 6 | 6

Final
1 | (United States) Martina Navratilova | 1 | 1
2 | (Socialist Federal Republic of Yugoslavia) Monica Seles | 6 | 6

=== Top half ===
==== Section 1 ====
First round
(West Germany) C Kohde-Kilsch | 2 | 6^{1}
(Australia) R McQuillan | 6 | 7^{7}
(Belgium) S Wasserman | 3 | 2
Q | (Luxembourg) K Kschwendt | 6 | 6
(Argentina) B Fulco | 7^{7} | 0 | 2
14 | (Italy) S Cecchini | 6^{4} | 6 | 6
16 | (Switzerland) C Caverzasio | 6 | 6
Q | (Australia) M Jaggard | 3 | 1
LL | (Italy) K Piccolini | 2 | 2
(France) J Halard | 6 | 6
(United States) D Faber | 6 | 6
(Italy) L Garrone | 4 | 4

Second round
1 | (United States) M Navratilova | 6 | 3 | 6
(Australia) R McQuillan | 2 | 6 | 2
Q | (Luxembourg) K Kschwendt | 1 | 6 | 3
14 | (Italy) S Cecchini | 6 | 1 | 6
16 | (Switzerland) C Caverzasio | 7 | 6
(France) J Halard | 5 | 2
(United States) D Faber | 0 | 2
6 | (Spain) C Martínez | 6 | 6

Third round
1 | (United States) M Navratilova | 6 | 3 | 6
14 | (Italy) S Cecchini | 4 | 6 | 3
16 | (Switzerland) C Caverzasio | 2 | 2
6 | (Spain) C Martínez | 6 | 6

Quarterfinals
1 | (United States) M Navratilova | 6 | 6
6 | (Spain) C Martínez | 2 | 0

==== Section 2 ====
First round
(United States) A Grossman | 6 | 6
Q | (Netherlands) H ter Riet | 4 | 2
(Greece) A Kanellopoulou | 7 | 4 | 4
(Czechoslovakia) R Rajchrtová | 5 | 6 | 6
(Australia) N Provis | 2 | 5
9 | (Peru) L Gildemeistar | 6 | 7
12 | (United States) J Capriati | 6 | 6
Q | (Czechoslovakia) L Lásková | 0 | 3
(Australia) J Byrne | 3 | 0
(United States) S Sloane | 6 | 6
(Italy) L Golarsa | 3 | 7 | 4
(Italy) L Ferrando | 6 | 5 | 1^{r}

Second round
4 | (Argentina) G Sabatini | 7^{7} | 6
(United States) A Grossman | 6^{3} | 0
(Czechoslovakia) R Rajchrtová | 6 | 7^{7}
9 | (Peru) L Gildemeistar | 4 | 6^{4}
12 | (United States) J Capriati | 6 | 7^{7}
(United States) S Sloane | 4 | 6^{5}
(Italy) L Golarsa | 6 | 7^{7}
7 | (France) N Tauziat | 3 | 6^{5}

Third round
4 | (Argentina) G Sabatini | 6 | 6
(Czechoslovakia) R Rajchrtová | 0 | 1
12 | (United States) J Capriati | 6 | 6^{8} | 6
(Italy) L Golarsa | 3 | 7^{10} | 2

Quarterfinals
4 | (Argentina) G Sabatini | 6 | 7
12 | (United States) J Capriati | 2 | 5

=== Bottom half ===
==== Section 3 ====
First round
(Italy) F Romanò | 3 | 4
Q | (Brazil) A Vieira | 6 | 6
(Argentina) P Tarabini | 6 | 6
(France) I Demongeot | 1 | 4
(Netherlands) N Jagerman | 5 | 7^{9} | 2
13 | (Sweden) C Lindqvist | 7 | 6^{7} | 6
11 | (Canada) H Kelesi | 6 | 6
(Australia) JA Faull | 4 | 1
(Italy) L Lapi | 6 | 2
(Hungary) A Temesvári | 2 | 1^{r}
LL | (Australia) K Godridge | 3 | 6 | 6
Q | (United Kingdom) S Smith | 6 | 1 | 4

Second round
8 | (Austria) J Wiesner | 7 | 5 | 2
Q | (Brazil) A Vieira | 5 | 7 | 6
(Argentina) P Tarabini | 6 | 3 | 1
13 | (Sweden) C Lindqvist | 4 | 6 | 6
11 | (Canada) H Kelesi | 6 | 6
(Italy) L Lapi | 2 | 0
LL | (Australia) K Godridge | 1 | 1
3 | (Spain) A Sánchez Vicario | 6 | 6

Third round
Q | (Brazil) A Vieira | 4 | 2
13 | (Sweden) C Lindqvist | 6 | 6
11 | (Canada) H Kelesi | 6 | 7
3 | (Spain) A Sánchez Vicario | 4 | 5

Quarterfinals
13 | (Sweden) C Lindqvist | 4 | 3
11 | (Canada) H Kelesi | 6 | 6

==== Section 4 ====
First round
Q | (Italy) S La Fratta | 2 | 6 | 6
(United States) S Martin | 6 | 2 | 2
(South Africa) A Coetzer | 7 | 1 | 7
(Italy) B Romanò | 5 | 6 | 5
(Soviet Union) N Medvedeva | 0 | 3
10 | (Italy) R Reggi | 6 | 6
15 | (Soviet Union) L Meskhi | 6 | 6
(South Africa) E Reinach | 2 | 2
(Czechoslovakia) P Langrová | 1 | 6^{5}
Q | (Argentina) M Paz | 6 | 7^{7}
(United States) L McNeil | 6^{2} | 2
(Czechoslovakia) R Zrubáková | 7^{7} | 6

Second round
5 | (Switzerland) Man Maleeva | 6 | 6
Q | (Italy) S La Fratta | 2 | 2
(South Africa) A Coetzer | 4 | 1
10 | (Italy) R Reggi | 6 | 6
15 | (Soviet Union) L Meskhi | 4 | 5
Q | (Argentina) M Paz | 6 | 7
(Czechoslovakia) R Zrubáková | 4 | 1
2 | (Socialist Federal Republic of Yugoslavia) M Seles | 6 | 6

Third round
5 | (Switzerland) Man Maleeva | 6 | 6
10 | (Italy) R Reggi | 3 | 3
Q | (Argentina) M Paz | 1 | 1
2 | (Socialist Federal Republic of Yugoslavia) M Seles | 6 | 6

Quarterfinals
5 | (Switzerland) Man Maleeva | 0 | 2
2 | (Socialist Federal Republic of Yugoslavia) M Seles | 6 | 6
