= 1990 Canadian Open – Women's doubles =

Women's doubles
- 1990 Canadian Open

Final
- Champions: (United States) Betsy Nagelsen (Argentina) Gabriela Sabatini
- Runners-up: (Canada) Helen Kelesi (Italy) Raffaella Reggi
- Score: 3–6, 6–2, 6–2

Details
- Draw: 28
- Seeds: 8

Events
Singles	men	women
Doubles	men	women
- Canadian Open

Gigi Fernández and Robin White were the defending champions, but chose not to participate not to participate. Betsy Nagelsen and Gabriela Sabatini won the title, defeating Helen Kelesi and Raffaella Reggi in the finals, 3–6, 6–2, 6–2.

== Seeds ==
The top four seeds received a bye to the second round.

1. (Soviet Union) Larisa Savchenko / (Soviet Union) Natalia Zvereva (second round)
2. (United States) Kathy Jordan / (Australia) Elizabeth Smylie (quarterfinal)
3. (Netherlands) Manon Bollegraf / (France) Nathalie Tauziat (second round)
4. (United States) Betsy Nagelsen / (Argentina) Gabriela Sabatini (champions)
5. (Bulgaria) Katerina Maleeva / (United States) Lori McNeil (quarterfinal)
6. (United Kingdom) Jo Durie / (New Zealand) Julie Richardson (second round)
7. (Canada) Helen Kelesi / (Italy) Raffaella Reggi (final)
8. (Canada) Jill Hetherington / (United States) Kathy Rinaldi (third round)

== Draw ==
Key

- Q = Qualifier
- WC = Wild card
- LL = Lucky loser
- Alt = Alternate
- ITF = ITF entry
- PR = Protected ranking
- SR = Special ranking
- SE = Special exempt
- JE = Junior exempt
- JR = Junior Accelerator Programme entrant
- CO = College Accelerator Programme entrant
- NG = Next Gen Accelerator Program entrant
- w/o = Walkover
- r = Retired
- d = Defaulted

=== Finals ===
Semifinals
5	(Bulgaria) Katerina Maleeva (United States) Lori McNeil	5	5
4	(United States) Betsy Nagelsen (Argentina) Gabriela Sabatini	7	7
7	(Canada) Helen Kelesi (Italy) Raffaella Reggi	2	6	7
2	(United States) Kathy Jordan (Australia) Elizabeth Smylie	6	3	5

Final
4	(United States) Betsy Nagelsen (Argentina) Gabriela Sabatini	3	6	6
7	(Canada) Helen Kelesi (Italy) Raffaella Reggi	6	2	2

=== Top half ===
First round
(New Zealand) B Cordwell (Australia) L Field	4	1
(Hong Kong) P Hy (Canada) R Simpson	6	6
(Australia) A Minter (France) C Suire	6	6
(United Kingdom) S Gomer (United Kingdom) M Javer	0	0
(United States) A Grousbeck (Japan) N Miyagi	3	3
5	(Bulgaria) K Maleeva (United States) L McNeil	6	6
(Australia) C Thompson (United Kingdom) C Wood	6	6
(Canada) T Dobson-Wahl (Canada) L Randmaa	2	4
(United States) B Bowes (United States) M Werdel	7	6
(Venezuela) M Mazzotta (Israel) Y Segal	6	2
(United States) C Cunningham (United States) A Schwartz	4	2
8	(Canada) J Hetherington (United States) K Rinaldi	6	6

Second round
1	(Soviet Union) L Savchenko (Soviet Union) N Zvereva
(Hong Kong) P Hy (Canada) R Simpson	w/o
(Australia) A Minter (France) C Suire	6	2
5	(Bulgaria) K Maleeva (United States) L McNeil	7	6
4	(United States) B Nagelsen (Argentina) G Sabatini	6	6
(Australia) C Thompson (United Kingdom) C Wood	1	0
(United States) B Bowes (United States) M Werdel	6	2
8	(Canada) J Hetherington (United States) K Rinaldi	7	6

Quarterfinals
(Hong Kong) P Hy (Canada) R Simpson	5	0
5	(Bulgaria) K Maleeva (United States) L McNeil	7	6
4	(United States) B Nagelsen (Argentina) G Sabatini	7	6
8	(Canada) J Hetherington (United States) K Rinaldi	6	3

Semifinals
5	(Bulgaria) Katerina Maleeva (United States) Lori McNeil	5	5
4	(United States) Betsy Nagelsen (Argentina) Gabriela Sabatini	7	7

=== Bottom half ===
First round
7	(Canada) H Kelesi (Italy) R Reggi	6	6
(United States) A Grossman (United States) L Spadea	1	0
(United States) A Leand (United Kingdom) S Loosemore	4	6	6
(Poland) R Baranski (Argentina) B Fulco	6	4	2
(Canada) C Delisle (Canada) S Italiano	4	0
(Sweden) M Strandlund (New Zealand) C Toleafoa	6	6
6	(United Kingdom) J Durie (New Zealand) J Richardson	4	7	6
(United States) P Barg-Mager (United States) T Phelps	6	5	1
(France) I Demongeot (West Germany) C Porwik	6	6
(United States) G Helgeson (United States) S Schefflin	3	3
(United States) L Glitz (United States) J Goodling	6	6
(Brazil) C Chabalgoity (Brazil) L Corsato-Owsianka	2	2

Second round
7	(Canada) H Kelesi (Italy) R Reggi	w/o
(United States) A Leand (United Kingdom) S Loosemore
(Sweden) M Strandlund (New Zealand) C Toleafoa	6	0	6
3	(Netherlands) M Bollegraf (France) N Tauziat	4	6	4
6	(United Kingdom) J Durie (New Zealand) J Richardson	3	2
(France) I Demongeot (West Germany) C Porwik	6	6
(United States) L Glitz (United States) J Goodling	3	0
2	(United States) K Jordan (Australia) E Smylie	6	6

Quarterfinals
7	(Canada) H Kelesi (Italy) R Reggi	6	6
(Sweden) M Strandlund (New Zealand) C Toleafoa	4	3
(France) I Demongeot (West Germany) C Porwik	2	6	5
2	(United States) K Jordan (Australia) E Smylie	6	4	7

Semifinals
7	(Canada) Helen Kelesi (Italy) Raffaella Reggi	2	6	7
2	(United States) Kathy Jordan (Australia) Elizabeth Smylie	6	3	5
