= 1990 Italian Open – Men's singles =

Men's singles
- 1990 Italian Open

Final
- Champion: (Austria) Thomas Muster
- Runner-up: (Soviet Union) Andrei Chesnokov
- Score: 6–1, 6–3, 6–1

Details
- Draw: 64
- Seeds: 16

Events
Singles	men	women
Doubles	men	women
← 1989 ·	Italian Open	· 1991 →

Thomas Muster defeated Andrei Chesnokov in the final, 6–1, 6–3, 6–1 to win the men's singles tennis title at the 1990 Italian Open.

Alberto Mancini was the defending champion, but lost to Chesnokov in the quarterfinals.

== Seeds ==
1. (United States) Brad Gilbert (third round)
2. (United States) Aaron Krickstein (third round)
3. (Ecuador) Andrés Gómez (semifinals)
4. (Spain) Emilio Sánchez (semifinals)
5. (United States) Jay Berger (second round)
6. (Argentina) Martín Jaite (third round)
7. (United States) Michael Chang (first round)
8. (Soviet Union) Andrei Chesnokov (final)
9. (United States) Jim Courier (third round)
10. (Austria) Thomas Muster (champion)
11. (Sweden) ~~Mats Wilander~~ (withdrew)
12. (Argentina) Guillermo Pérez Roldán (quarterfinals)
13. (Sweden) Jonas Svensson (third round)
14. (Sweden) Magnus Gustafsson (third round)
15. (Czechoslovakia) Petr Korda (first round)
16. (Argentina) Alberto Mancini (quarterfinals)

== Draw ==
=== Key ===
- Q = Qualifier
- WC = Wild card
- LL = Lucky loser
- Alt = Alternate
- ITF = ITF entry
- PR = Protected ranking
- SR = Special ranking
- SE = Special exempt
- JE = Junior exempt
- JR = Junior Accelerator Programme entrant
- CO = College Accelerator Programme entrant
- NG = Next Gen Accelerator Program entrant
- w/o = Walkover
- r = Retired
- d = Defaulted

=== Finals ===
Semifinals
8	(Soviet Union) Andrei Chesnokov	6	6	7
4	(Spain) Emilio Sánchez	7	4	6
3	(Ecuador) Andrés Gómez	7	4	6
10	(Austria) Thomas Muster	5	6	7

Final
8	(Soviet Union) Andrei Chesnokov	1	3	1
10	(Austria) Thomas Muster	6	6	6

=== Top half ===
==== Section 1 ====
First round
1	(United States) B Gilbert	1	6	6
(United States) J Pugh	6	4	4
(United States) D Wheaton	2	3
(Brazil) L Mattar	6	6
Q	(France) T Champion	2	4
SE	(France) H Leconte	6	6
LL	(Argentina) C Miniussi	6	6	4
16	(Argentina) A Mancini	4	7	6
9	(United States) J Courier	6	1	6
(Argentina) F Davín	1	6	4
(Peru) J Yzaga	6	4	6
(Spain) J Sánchez	4	6	4
Q	(Italy) F Mordegan	6	5	2
(Italy) P Canè	4	7	6
(United States) J Arias	6	3
8	(Soviet Union) A Chesnokov	7	6

Second round
1	(United States) B Gilbert	7	6
(Brazil) L Mattar	6	4
SE	(France) H Leconte	4	4
16	(Argentina) A Mancini	6	6
9	(United States) J Courier	6	6
(Peru) J Yzaga	3	4
(Italy) P Canè	6	3	3
8	(Soviet Union) A Chesnokov	4	6	6

Third round
1	(United States) B Gilbert	2	1
16	(Argentina) A Mancini	6	6
9	(United States) J Courier	6	6	3
8	(Soviet Union) A Chesnokov	4	7	6

Quarterfinals
16	(Argentina) A Mancini	6	0
8	(Soviet Union) A Chesnokov	7	6

==== Section 2 ====
First round
4	(Spain) E Sánchez	6	6
(Canada) A Sznajder	2	1
(United States) T Witsken	4	6	4
(Uruguay) M Filippini	6	3	6
(Spain) T Carbonell	6	6
WC	(Italy) G Pozzi	1	3
Q	(United States) L Jensen	2	6	2
13	(Sweden) J Svensson	6	3	6
12	(Argentina) G Pérez Roldán	6	6	6
(Haiti) R Agénor	7	2	4
(United States) R Reneberg	6	3	5
(France) J-P Fleurian	4	6	7
Q	(Italy) R Furlan	6	6
(Czechoslovakia) M Střelba	3	3
Q	(West Germany) D Leppen	3	1
6	(Argentina) M Jaite	6	6

Second round
4	(Spain) E Sánchez	4	6	6
(Uruguay) M Filippini	6	1	2
(Spain) T Carbonell	3	1
13	(Sweden) J Svensson	6	6
12	(Argentina) G Pérez Roldán	6	6
(France) J-P Fleurian	3	4
Q	(Italy) R Furlan	4	4
6	(Argentina) M Jaite	6	6

Third round
4	(Spain) E Sánchez	6	6
13	(Sweden) J Svensson	3	2
12	(Argentina) G Pérez Roldán	6	6
6	(Argentina) M Jaite	4	3

Quarterfinals
4	(Spain) E Sánchez	7	6
12	(Argentina) G Pérez Roldán	6	2

=== Bottom half ===
==== Section 3 ====
First round
5	(United States) J Berger	3	6	6
(Israel) A Mansdorf	6	1	0
(Italy) O Camporese	6	6
Q	(France) A Boetsch	4	4
WC	(Italy) C Pistolesi	3	6
Q	(Italy) M Cierro	6	7
(Netherlands) P Haarhuis	6	6
LL	(Spain) S Casal	1	4
14	(Sweden) M Gustafsson	3	6	6
(Spain) J Arrese	6	4	3
WC	(Italy) S Pescosolido	6	6
(United States) L Duncan	2	3
(Brazil) C Motta	3	2
WC	(Italy) D Nargiso	6	6
(France) Y Noah	1	7	3
3	(Ecuador) A Gómez	6	6	6

Second round
5	(United States) J Berger	4	4
(Italy) O Camporese	6	6
Q	(Italy) M Cierro	4	4
(Netherlands) P Haarhuis	6	6
14	(Sweden) M Gustafsson	6	6	6
WC	(Italy) S Pescosolido	4	7	2
WC	(Italy) D Nargiso	6	4
3	(Ecuador) A Gómez	7	6

Third round
(Italy) O Camporese	6	6
(Netherlands) P Haarhuis	4	1
14	(Sweden) M Gustafsson	4	5
3	(Ecuador) A Gómez	6	7

Quarterfinals
(Italy) O Camporese	1	2
3	(Ecuador) A Gómez	6	6

==== Section 4 ====
First round
7	(United States) M Chang	3	3
(Sweden) J Gunnarsson	6	6
(Czechoslovakia) M Šrejber	6	7	3
(Spain) S Bruguera	7	6	6
(Sweden) N Kroon	3	3
WC	(Sweden) A Järryd	6	6
(Switzerland) J Hlasek	3	4
10	(Austria) T Muster	6	6
15	(Czechoslovakia) P Korda	3	2
(France) G Forget	6	6
(Soviet Union) A Volkov	6	1	6
(Spain) J Aguilera	3	6	4
Q	(West Germany) T Theine	4	6	4
(Czechoslovakia) K Nováček	6	1	6
(United States) J Grabb	1	3
2	(United States) A Krickstein	6	6

Second round
(Sweden) J Gunnarsson	6	6
(Spain) S Bruguera	4	2
WC	(Sweden) A Järryd	1^{r}
10	(Austria) T Muster	5
(France) G Forget	6	3	6
(Soviet Union) A Volkov	1	6	2
(Czechoslovakia) K Nováček	2	2
2	(United States) A Krickstein	6	6

Third round
(Sweden) J Gunnarsson	3	2
10	(Austria) T Muster	6	6
(France) G Forget	6	7
2	(United States) A Krickstein	4	6

Quarterfinals
10	(Austria) T Muster	6	3	6
(France) G Forget	2	6	3
