= 1990 Canadian Open – Men's doubles =

Men's doubles
- 1990 Canadian Open
- 1989 Champions: (New Zealand) Kelly Evernden (United States) Todd Witsken

Final
- Champions: (United States) Paul Annacone (United States) David Wheaton
- Runners-up: (Australia) Broderick Dyke (Sweden) Peter Lundgren
- Score: 6–1, 7–6

Details
- Draw: 28
- Seeds: 8

Events
Singles	men	women
Doubles	men	women
- Canadian Open

Kelly Evernden and Todd Witsken were the defending champions but they competed with different partners that year, Evernden with Nicolás Pereira and Witsken with Jorge Lozano.

Evernden and Pereira lost in the second round to Peter Doohan and Laurie Warder, as did Lozano and Witsken to Steve DeVries and David Macpherson.

Paul Annacone and David Wheaton won in the final 6–1, 7–6 against Broderick Dyke and Peter Lundgren.

== Seeds ==
Champion seeds are indicated in bold text while text in italics indicates the round in which those seeds were eliminated. The top four seeded teams received byes into the second round.

1. (Canada) Grant Connell / (Canada) Glenn Michibata (semifinals)
2. (Mexico) Jorge Lozano / (United States) Todd Witsken (second round)
3. n/a
4. (United States) Scott Davis / (United States) David Pate (quarterfinals)
5. (West Germany) Udo Riglewski / (West Germany) Michael Stich (second round)
6. (Australia) Darren Cahill / (Australia) Mark Kratzmann (first round)
7. (United States) Ken Flach / (United States) Robert Seguso (first round)
8. (United Kingdom) Neil Broad / (United States) Kelly Jones (second round)

== Draw ==
Key

- Q = Qualifier
- WC = Wild card
- LL = Lucky loser
- Alt = Alternate
- ITF = ITF entry
- PR = Protected ranking
- SR = Special ranking
- SE = Special exempt
- JE = Junior exempt
- JR = Junior Accelerator Programme entrant
- CO = College Accelerator Programme entrant
- NG = Next Gen Accelerator Program entrant
- w/o = Walkover
- r = Retired
- d = Defaulted

=== Finals ===
Final
(Australia) Broderick Dyke (Sweden) Peter Lundgren	1	6
(United States) **Paul Annacone** (United States) **David Wheaton**	**6**	**7**

=== Top half ===
First round
(United States) J Canter (New Zealand) B Derlin	1	4
(United States) **J McEnroe** (Australia) **M Woodforde**	**6**	**6**
WC	(Canada) S Leblanc (Canada) A Sznajder	4	**7**	2
(Australia) **J Stoltenberg** (Australia) **S Youl**	**6**	5	**6**
Q	(United States) **T Nelson** (United States) **B Shelton**	**6**	**6**
7	(United States) K Flach (United States) R Seguso	4	2
(United States) **S Cannon** (United States) **R Reneberg**	**6**	**7**
(United States) P Chamberlin (United States) J Rive	3	5
(Switzerland) J Hlasek (United States) P Sampras	**6**	3	6
(Australia) **B Dyke** (Sweden) **P Lundgren**	1	**6**	**7**
WC	(Canada) R Janecek (Canada) D Nestor	1	2
5	(West Germany) **U Riglewski** (West Germany) **M Stich**	**6**	**6**

Second round
1	(Canada) **G Connell** (Canada) **G Michibata**	4	**7**	**7**
(United States) J McEnroe (Australia) M Woodforde	**6**	5	5
(Australia) J Stoltenberg (Australia) S Youl	**7**	2	6
Q	(United States) **T Nelson** (United States) **B Shelton**	6	**6**	**7**
4	(United States) **S Davis** (United States) **D Pate**	**6**	4	**6**
(United States) S Cannon (United States) R Reneberg	4	**6**	4
(Australia) **B Dyke** (Sweden) **P Lundgren**	3	**7**	**6**
5	(West Germany) U Riglewski (West Germany) M Stich	**6**	6	4

Quarterfinals
1	(Canada) **G Connell** (Canada) **G Michibata**	6	**7**	**7**
Q	(United States) T Nelson (United States) B Shelton	**7**	5	6
4	(United States) S Davis (United States) D Pate	3	4
(Australia) **B Dyke** (Sweden) **P Lundgren**	**6**	**6**

Semifinals
1	(Canada) G Connell (Canada) G Michibata	2	**6**	2
(Australia) **B Dyke** (Sweden) **P Lundgren**	**6**	4	**6**

=== Bottom half ===
First round
6	(Australia) D Cahill (Australia) M Kratzmann	**6**	3	4
(New Zealand) **K Evernden** (Venezuela) **N Pereira**	4	**6**	**6**
(Czechoslovakia) P Korda (Czechoslovakia) M Šrejber	2	4
(Australia) **P Doohan** (Australia) **L Warder**	**6**	**6**
Q	(Sweden) P Nyborg (United States) J Sobel	6	1
(United States) **C Beckman** (United States) **L Jensen**	**7**	**6**
8	(United Kingdom) **N Broad** (United States) **K Jones**	**7**	2	**6**
(France) J-P Fleurian (Mexico) L Lavalle	5	**6**	2
(United States) **P Annacone** (United States) **D Wheaton**	3	**6**	**6**
WC	(Canada) B Gyetko (Canada) M Laurendeau	**6**	1	3
(United States) K Kinnear (United States) B Pearce	**6**	3	2
(United States) **S DeVries** (Australia) **D Macpherson**	3	**6**	**6**

Second round
(New Zealand) K Evernden (Venezuela) N Pereira	5	3
(Australia) **P Doohan** (Australia) **L Warder**	**7**	**6**
(United States) **C Beckman** (United States) **L Jensen**	**7**	**7**
LL	(United States) L Shiras (Kenya) P Wekesa	6	5
8	(United Kingdom) N Broad (United States) K Jones	4	3
(United States) **P Annacone** (United States) **D Wheaton**	**6**	**6**
(United States) **S DeVries** (Australia) **D Macpherson**	4	**7**	**6**
2	(Mexico) J Lozano (United States) T Witsken	**6**	6	4

Quarterfinals
(Australia) **P Doohan** (Australia) **L Warder**	**6**	**6**
(United States) C Beckman (United States) L Jensen	4	4
(United States) **P Annacone** (United States) **D Wheaton**	**7**	**6**
(United States) S DeVries (Australia) D Macpherson	5	1

Semifinals
(Australia) P Doohan (Australia) L Warder	3	6
(United States) **P Annacone** (United States) **D Wheaton**	**6**	**7**
