= 1990 Italian Open – Women's doubles =

Women's doubles
- 1990 Italian Open

Final
- Champions: (Canada) Helen Kelesi (Socialist Federal Republic of Yugoslavia) Monica Seles
- Runners-up: (Italy) Laura Garrone (Italy) Laura Golarsa
- Score: 6–3, 6–4

Details
- Draw: 28
- Seeds: 8

Events
Singles	men	women
Doubles	men	women
← 1989 ·	Italian Open	· 1991 →

Elizabeth Smylie and Janine Thompson were the defending champions, but Smylie did not compete this year. Thompson teamed up with Jenny Byrne and lost in the first round to Claudia Kohde-Kilsch and Brenda Schultz.

Helen Kelesi and Monica Seles won the title by defeating Laura Garrone and Laura Golarsa 6–3, 6–4 in the final.

== Seeds ==
The first four seeds received a bye to the second round.

1. (United States) Katrina Adams / (United States) Lori McNeil (semifinals)
2. (Netherlands) Manon Bollegraf / (Argentina) Mercedes Paz (second round)
3. (Australia) Nicole Provis / (South Africa) Elna Reinach (quarterfinals)
4. (Soviet Union) Natalia Medvedeva / (Soviet Union) Leila Meskhi (quarterfinals)
5. (Italy) Sandra Cecchini / (Argentina) Patricia Tarabini (first round)
6. (Switzerland) Manuela Maleeva-Fragnière / (Soviet Union) Larisa Savchenko (semifinals)
7. (France) Nathalie Tauziat / (Austria) Judith Wiesner (first round)
8. (Australia) Jenny Byrne / (Australia) Janine Thompson (first round)

== Draw ==
=== Key ===
- Q = Qualifier
- WC = Wild card
- LL = Lucky loser
- Alt = Alternate
- ITF = ITF entry
- PR = Protected ranking
- SR = Special ranking
- SE = Special exempt
- JE = Junior exempt
- JR = Junior Accelerator Programme entrant
- CO = College Accelerator Programme entrant
- NG = Next Gen Accelerator Program entrant
- w/o = Walkover
- r = Retired
- d = Defaulted

=== Finals ===
Semifinals
1	(United States) Katrina Adams (United States) Lori McNeil	6	4	4
(Canada) Helen Kelesi (Socialist Federal Republic of Yugoslavia) Monica Seles	2	6	6
(Italy) Laura Garrone (Italy) Laura Golarsa	6	4	7^{7}
6	(Switzerland) Manuela Maleeva-Fragnière (Soviet Union) Larisa Savchenko	4	6	6^{4}

Final
(Canada) Helen Kelesi (Socialist Federal Republic of Yugoslavia) Monica Seles	6	6
(Italy) Laura Garrone (Italy) Laura Golarsa	3	4

=== Top half ===
First round
(Socialist Federal Republic of Yugoslavia) S Goleš (United States) J Smoller	3	4
(France) S Amiach (France) N Herreman	6	6
(Australia) K McDonald (United States) B Norton	2	7	4
(United States) J Capriati (United States) M Navratilova	6	5	6
(West Germany) C Kohde-Kilsch (Netherlands) B Schultz	6	6
8	(Australia) J Byrne (Australia) J Thompson	3	4
(Peru) L Gildemeister (Sweden) C Lindqvist	6	6
(Australia) JA Faull (Australia) R McQuillan	4	1
(Canada) H Kelesi (Socialist Federal Republic of Yugoslavia) M Seles	6	6
(Italy) S Farina (Italy) R Grande	4	4
(United States) A Grossman (Czechoslovakia) P Langrová	2	6	6
5	(Italy) S Cecchini (Argentina) P Tarabini	6	4	1

Second round
1	(United States) K Adams (United States) L McNeil	2	7	7^{7}
(France) S Amiach (France) N Herreman	6	5	6^{4}
(United States) J Capriati (United States) M Navratilova	7	3	6
(West Germany) C Kohde-Kilsch (Netherlands) B Schultz	5	6	3
3	(Australia) N Provis (South Africa) E Reinach	7^{7}	6
(Peru) L Gildemeister (Sweden) C Lindqvist	6^{4}	1
(Canada) H Kelesi (Socialist Federal Republic of Yugoslavia) M Seles	2	7	6
(United States) A Grossman (Czechoslovakia) P Langrová	6	5	4

Quarterfinals
1	(United States) K Adams (United States) L McNeil
(United States) J Capriati (United States) M Navratilova	d
3	(Australia) N Provis (South Africa) E Reinach	4	4
(Canada) H Kelesi (Socialist Federal Republic of Yugoslavia) M Seles	6	6

Semifinals
1	(United States) Katrina Adams (United States) Lori McNeil	6	4	4
(Canada) Helen Kelesi (Socialist Federal Republic of Yugoslavia) Monica Seles	2	6	6

=== Bottom half ===
First round
7	(France) N Tauziat (Austria) J Wiesner	2	5
(Italy) L Garrone (Italy) L Golarsa	6	7
(Argentina) G Castro (Spain) C Martínez	3	6	3
(Belgium) S Wasserman (Czechoslovakia) R Zrubáková	6	1	6
Q	(Italy) N Baudone (Italy) C Caverzasio	3	6	7
(France) I Demongeot (France) J Halard	6	4	5
6	(Switzerland) M Maleeva-Fragnière (Soviet Union) L Savchenko	6	6
(Argentina) A Tiezzi (Argentina) A Villagrán	3	2
(Czechoslovakia) R Rajchrtová (Hungary) A Temesvári	6	6
(Australia) K Radford (Austria) H Sprung	3	4
(Argentina) F Labat (Australia) R Stubbs	3	3
(Italy) L Ferrando (Australia) M Jaggard	6	6

Second round
(Italy) L Garrone (Italy) L Golarsa	5	6	7^{10}
(Belgium) S Wasserman (Czechoslovakia) R Zrubáková	7	4	6^{8}
Q	(Italy) N Baudone (Italy) C Caverzasio	3	2
4	(Soviet Union) N Medvedeva (Soviet Union) L Meskhi	6	6
6	(Switzerland) M Maleeva-Fragnière (Soviet Union) L Savchenko	7^{7}	6^{4}	6
(Czechoslovakia) R Rajchrtová (Hungary) A Temesvári	6^{4}	7^{7}	3
(Italy) L Ferrando (Australia) M Jaggard	0	6	6
2	(Netherlands) M Bollegraf (Argentina) M Paz	6	1	2

Quarterfinals
(Italy) L Garrone (Italy) L Golarsa	5	6	6
4	(Soviet Union) N Medvedeva (Soviet Union) L Meskhi	7	4	4
6	(Switzerland) M Maleeva-Fragnière (Soviet Union) L Savchenko	6	6
(Italy) L Ferrando (Australia) M Jaggard	2	1

Semifinals
(Italy) Laura Garrone (Italy) Laura Golarsa	6	4	7^{7}
6	(Switzerland) Manuela Maleeva (Soviet Union) Larisa Neiland	4	6	6^{4}
