= WTA Tier I tournaments =

Tennis tournament category

The WTA Tier I tournaments were Women's Tennis Association tennis elite tournaments held from 1990 until the end of the 2008 season. From 1988 to 1990, the different levels of WTA tournaments were referred to by the term 'Category', and there were 5 categories. Two of the Tier I tournaments, Indian Wells and Miami, were also joint events held simultaneously with the ATP Tour Masters Series.

There were initially 6 Tier I tournaments held annually from 1990. The list expanded to 8 events in 1993, 9 in 1997 and 10 in 2004, before being scaled back to 9 for 2008.

In 2009 the WTA changed the tournament categories, so that the majority of Tier I and Tier II tournaments were in one category, Premier Tournaments, split into three categories.

== Events ==
Tournament	Also known as	City(s)	Country	Court surface	Tier I from	Years
Miami Open	Sony Ericsson Open	Miami	United States	Hard	1990–2008	19
German Open	Qatar Total German Open	Berlin (Note: Until German reunification, in 1990, tournament was held in West Berlin, West Germany.)	Germany	Red Clay	1990–2008	19
Canadian Open	Rogers Cup	Montreal/Toronto (rotates each year)	Canada	Hard	1990–2008	19
Family Circle Cup	Family Circle Cup	Hilton Head and Charleston	United States	Green Clay	1990–2008	19
Italian Open	Internazionali BNL d'Italia	Rome	Italy	Red Clay	1990–2008	19
Pan Pacific Open	Toray Pan Pacific Open	Yokohama and Tokyo	Japan	Hard	1993–2008	16
Zurich Open	Zurich Open	Zürich	Switzerland	Hard (i)	1993–2007	15
Indian Wells Open	Pacific Life Open	Indian Wells	United States	Hard	1996–2008	13
Kremlin Cup	Kremlin Cup	Moscow	Russia	Carpet (i)	1997–2008	12
Southern California Open	Acura Classic	San Diego	United States	Hard	2004–2007	4
Advanta Championships Philadelphia	Advanta Championships Philadelphia	Philadelphia	United States	Carpet (i)	1993–1995	3
Virginia Slims of Florida	Virginia Slims of Florida	Boca Raton	United States	Hard	1991–1992	2
Ameritech Cup	Ameritech Cup Chicago	Chicago	United States	Carpet (i)	1990	1
Qatar Open	Qatar Total Open	Doha	Qatar	Hard	2008	1

== Singles results ==
=== 1988 ===
Tournament	Winner	Runner-up	Score
Key Biscayne	(West Germany) Steffi Graf	(United States) Chris Evert	6–4, 6–4
Berlin	(West Germany) Steffi Graf	(Czechoslovakia) Helena Suková	6–3, 6–2

=== 1989 ===
Tournament	Winner	Runner-up	Score
Key Biscayne	(Argentina) Gabriela Sabatini	(United States) Chris Evert	6–1, 4–6, 6–2
Berlin	(West Germany) Steffi Graf	(Argentina) Gabriela Sabatini	6–3, 6–1

=== 1990 ===
Tournament	Winner	Runner-up	Score
Chicago	(United States) Martina Navratilova	(Switzerland) Manuela Maleeva-Fragniere	6–3, 6–2
Miami	(Socialist Federal Republic of Yugoslavia) Monica Seles	(Austria) Judith Wiesner	6–1, 6–2
Hilton Head	(United States) Martina Navratilova	(United States) Jennifer Capriati	6–2, 6–4
Rome	(Socialist Federal Republic of Yugoslavia) Monica Seles	(United States) Martina Navratilova	6–1, 6–1
Berlin	(Socialist Federal Republic of Yugoslavia) Monica Seles	(West Germany) Steffi Graf	6–4, 6–3
Montreal	(Germany) Steffi Graf	(Bulgaria) Katerina Maleeva	6–1, 6–7^{(6–8)}, 6–3

=== 1991 ===
Tournament	Winner	Runner-up	Score
Boca Raton	(Argentina) Gabriela Sabatini	(Germany) Steffi Graf	6–4, 7–6^{(8–6)}
Miami	(Socialist Federal Republic of Yugoslavia) Monica Seles	(Argentina) Gabriela Sabatini	6–3, 7–5
Hilton Head	(Argentina) Gabriela Sabatini	(Soviet Union) Leila Meskhi	6–1, 6–1
Rome	(Argentina) Gabriela Sabatini	(Socialist Federal Republic of Yugoslavia) Monica Seles	6–3, 6–2
Berlin	(Germany) Steffi Graf	(Spain) Arantxa Sánchez Vicario	6–3, 4–6, 7–6^{(8–6)}
Toronto	(United States) Jennifer Capriati	(Bulgaria) Katerina Maleeva	6–2, 6–3

=== 1992 ===
Tournament	Winner	Runner-up	Score
Boca Raton	(Germany) Steffi Graf	(Spain) Conchita Martínez	3–6, 6–2, 6–0
Miami	(Spain) Arantxa Sánchez Vicario	(Argentina) Gabriela Sabatini	6–1, 6–4
Hilton Head	(Argentina) Gabriela Sabatini	(Spain) Conchita Martínez	6–1, 6–4
Rome	(Argentina) Gabriela Sabatini	(Federal Republic of Yugoslavia) Monica Seles	7–5, 6–4
Berlin	(Germany) Steffi Graf	(Spain) Arantxa Sánchez Vicario	4–6, 7–5, 6–2
Montreal	(Spain) Arantxa Sánchez Vicario	(Federal Republic of Yugoslavia) Monica Seles	6–3, 4–6, 6–4

=== 1993 ===
Tournament	Winner	Runner-up	Score
Yokohama (Note: In 1993, the Toray Pan Pacific Open was held in Yokohama instead of Tokyo.)	(United States) Martina Navratilova	(Latvia) Larisa Savchenko-Neiland	6–2, 6–2
Miami	(Spain) Arantxa Sánchez Vicario	(Germany) Steffi Graf	6–4, 3–6, 6–3
Hilton Head	(Germany) Steffi Graf	(Spain) Arantxa Sánchez Vicario	7–6^{(10–8)}, 6–1
Rome	(Spain) Conchita Martínez	(Argentina) Gabriela Sabatini	7–5, 6–1
Berlin	(Germany) Steffi Graf	(Argentina) Gabriela Sabatini	7–6^{(7–3)}, 2–6, 6–4
Toronto	(Germany) Steffi Graf	(United States) Jennifer Capriati	6–1, 0–6, 6–3
Zurich	(Switzerland) Manuela Maleeva-Fragniere	(United States) Martina Navratilova	6–3, 7–6^{(7–1)}
Philadelphia	(Spain) Conchita Martínez	(Germany) Steffi Graf	6–3, 6–3

=== 1994 ===
Tournament	Winner	Runner-up	Score
Tokyo	(Germany) Steffi Graf	(United States) Martina Navratilova	6–2, 6–4
Miami	(Germany) Steffi Graf	(Belarus) Natasha Zvereva	4–6, 6–1, 6–2
Hilton Head	(Spain) Conchita Martínez	(Belarus) Natasha Zvereva	6–4, 6–0
Rome	(Spain) Conchita Martínez	(United States) Martina Navratilova	7–6^{(7–5)}, 6–4
Berlin	(Germany) Steffi Graf	(Netherlands) Brenda Schultz	7–6^{(8–6)}, 6–4
Montreal	(Spain) Arantxa Sánchez Vicario	(Germany) Steffi Graf	7–5, 1–6, 7–6^{(7–4)}
Zurich	(Bulgaria) Magdalena Maleeva	(Belarus) Natasha Zvereva	7–5, 3–6, 6–4
Philadelphia	(Germany) Anke Huber	(France) Mary Pierce	6–0, 6–7^{(4–7)}, 7–5

=== 1995 ===
Tournament	Winner	Runner-up	Score
Tokyo	(Japan) Kimiko Date	(United States) Lindsay Davenport	6–1, 6–2
Miami	(Germany) Steffi Graf	(Japan) Kimiko Date	6–1, 6–4
Hilton Head	(Spain) Conchita Martínez	(Bulgaria) Magdalena Maleeva	6–1, 6–1
Rome	(Spain) Conchita Martínez	(Spain) Arantxa Sánchez Vicario	6–3, 6–1
Berlin	(Spain) Arantxa Sánchez Vicario	(Bulgaria) Magdalena Maleeva	6–4, 6–1
Toronto	(United States) Monica Seles	(South Africa) Amanda Coetzer	6–0, 6–1
Zurich	(Croatia) Iva Majoli	(France) Mary Pierce	6–4, 6–4
Philadelphia	(Germany) Steffi Graf	(United States) Lori McNeil	6–1, 4–6, 6–3

=== 1996 ===
Tournament	Winner	Runner-up	Score
Tokyo	(Croatia) Iva Majoli	(Spain) Arantxa Sánchez Vicario	6–4, 6–1
Indian Wells	(Germany) Steffi Graf	(Spain) Conchita Martínez	7–6^{(7–5)}, 7–6^{(7–5)}
Miami	(Germany) Steffi Graf	(United States) Chanda Rubin	6–1, 6–3
Hilton Head	(Spain) Arantxa Sánchez Vicario	(Austria) Barbara Paulus	6–2, 2–6, 6–2
Rome	(Spain) Conchita Martínez	(Switzerland) Martina Hingis	6–2, 6–3
Berlin	(Germany) Steffi Graf	(Slovakia) Karina Habšudová	4–6, 6–2, 7–5
Montreal	(United States) Monica Seles	(Spain) Arantxa Sánchez Vicario	6–1, 7–6^{(7–2)}
Zurich	(Czech Republic) Jana Novotná	(Switzerland) Martina Hingis	6–2, 6–2

=== 1997 ===
Tournament	Winner	Runner-up	Score
Tokyo	(Switzerland) Martina Hingis	(Germany) Steffi Graf	Walkover
Indian Wells	(United States) Lindsay Davenport	(Romania) Irina Spîrlea	6–2, 6–1
Miami	(Switzerland) Martina Hingis	(United States) Monica Seles	6–2, 6–1
Hilton Head	(Switzerland) Martina Hingis	(United States) Monica Seles	3–6, 6–3, 7–6^{(7–5)}
Rome	(France) Mary Pierce	(Spain) Conchita Martínez	6–4, 6–0
Berlin	(United States) Mary Joe Fernández	(France) Mary Pierce	6–4, 6–2
Toronto	(United States) Monica Seles	(Germany) Anke Huber	6–2, 6–4
Zurich	(United States) Lindsay Davenport	(France) Nathalie Tauziat	7–6^{(7–3)}, 7–5
Moscow	(Czech Republic) Jana Novotná	(Japan) Ai Sugiyama	6–3, 6–4

=== 1998 ===
Tournament	Winner	Runner-up	Score
Tokyo	(United States) Lindsay Davenport	(Switzerland) Martina Hingis	6–3, 6–3
Indian Wells	(Switzerland) Martina Hingis	(United States) Lindsay Davenport	6–3, 6–4
Miami	(United States) Venus Williams	(Russia) Anna Kournikova	2–6, 6–4, 6–1
Hilton Head	(South Africa) Amanda Coetzer	(Romania) Irina Spîrlea	6–3, 6–4
Rome	(Switzerland) Martina Hingis	(United States) Venus Williams	6–3, 2–6, 6–3
Berlin	(Spain) Conchita Martínez	(France) Amélie Mauresmo	6–4, 6–4
Montreal	(United States) Monica Seles	(Spain) Arantxa Sánchez Vicario	6–3, 6–2
Zurich	(United States) Lindsay Davenport	(United States) Venus Williams	6–3, 6–4
Moscow	(France) Mary Pierce	(United States) Monica Seles	7–6^{(7–2)}, 6–3

=== 1999 ===
Tournament	Winner	Runner-up	Score
Tokyo	(Switzerland) Martina Hingis	(South Africa) Amanda Coetzer	6–2, 6–1
Indian Wells	(United States) Serena Williams	(Germany) Steffi Graf	6–3, 3–6, 7–5
Miami	(United States) Venus Williams	(United States) Serena Williams	6–1, 4–6, 6–4
Hilton Head	(Switzerland) Martina Hingis	(Russia) Anna Kournikova	6–4, 6–3
Rome	(United States) Venus Williams	(France) Mary Pierce	6–4, 6–2
Berlin	(Switzerland) Martina Hingis	(France) Julie Halard-Decugis	6–0, 6–1
Toronto	(Switzerland) Martina Hingis	(United States) Monica Seles	6–4, 6–4
Zurich	(United States) Venus Williams	(Switzerland) Martina Hingis	6–3, 6–4
Moscow	(France) Nathalie Tauziat	(Austria) Barbara Schett	2–6, 6–4, 6–1

=== 2000 ===
Tournament	Winner	Runner-up	Score
Tokyo	(Switzerland) Martina Hingis	(France) Sandrine Testud	6–3, 7–5
Indian Wells	(United States) Lindsay Davenport	(Switzerland) Martina Hingis	4–6, 6–4, 6–0
Miami	(Switzerland) Martina Hingis	(United States) Lindsay Davenport	6–3, 6–2
Hilton Head	(France) Mary Pierce	(Spain) Arantxa Sánchez-Vicario	6–1, 6–0
Berlin	(Spain) Conchita Martínez	(South Africa) Amanda Coetzer	6–1, 6–2
Rome	(United States) Monica Seles	(France) Amélie Mauresmo	6–2, 7–6^{(7–4)}
Montreal	(Switzerland) Martina Hingis	(United States) Serena Williams	0–6, 6–3, 3–0 retired
Zurich	(Switzerland) Martina Hingis	(United States) Lindsay Davenport	6–2, 4–6, 7–5
Moscow	(Switzerland) Martina Hingis	(Russia) Anna Kournikova	6–3, 6–1

=== 2001 ===
Tournament	Winner	Runner-up	Score
Tokyo	(United States) Lindsay Davenport	(Switzerland) Martina Hingis	6–7^{(4–7)}, 6–4, 6–2
Indian Wells	(United States) Serena Williams	(Belgium) Kim Clijsters	4–6, 6–4, 6–2
Miami	(United States) Venus Williams	(United States) Jennifer Capriati	4–6, 6–1, 7–6^{(7–4)}
Charleston	(United States) Jennifer Capriati	(Switzerland) Martina Hingis	6–0, 4–6, 6–4
Berlin	(France) Amélie Mauresmo	(United States) Jennifer Capriati	6–4, 2–6, 6–3
Rome	(Serbia and Montenegro) Jelena Dokić	(France) Amélie Mauresmo	7–6^{(7–3)}, 6–1
Toronto	(United States) Serena Williams	(United States) Jennifer Capriati	6–1, 6–7^{(7–9)}, 6–3
Moscow	(Serbia and Montenegro) Jelena Dokić	(Russia) Elena Dementieva	6–3, 6–3
Zurich	(United States) Lindsay Davenport	(Serbia and Montenegro) Jelena Dokić	6–3, 6–1

=== 2002 ===
Tournament	Winner	Runner-up	Score
Tokyo	(Switzerland) Martina Hingis	(United States) Monica Seles	7–6^{(8–6)}, 4–6, 6–3
Indian Wells	(Slovakia) Daniela Hantuchová	(Switzerland) Martina Hingis	6–3, 6–4
Miami	(United States) Serena Williams	(United States) Jennifer Capriati	7–5, 7–6
Charleston	(Croatia) Iva Majoli	(Switzerland) Patty Schnyder	6–3, 6–4
Berlin	(Belgium) Justine Henin	(United States) Serena Williams	6–2, 1–6, 7–6^{(7–5)}
Rome	(United States) Serena Williams	(Belgium) Justine Henin	7–6, 6–4
Montreal	(France) Amélie Mauresmo	(United States) Jennifer Capriati	6–4, 6–1
Moscow	(Bulgaria) Magdalena Maleeva	(United States) Lindsay Davenport	5–7, 6–3, 7–6^{(7–4)}
Zurich	(Switzerland) Patty Schnyder	(United States) Lindsay Davenport	6–7^{(5–7)}, 7–6^{(10–8)}, 6–3

=== 2003 ===
Tournament	Winner	Runner-up	Score
Tokyo	(United States) Lindsay Davenport	(United States) Monica Seles	6–7^{(6–8)}, 6–1, 6–2
Indian Wells	(Belgium) Kim Clijsters	(United States) Lindsay Davenport	6–4, 7–5
Miami	(United States) Serena Williams	(United States) Jennifer Capriati	4–6, 6–4, 6–1
Charleston	(Belgium) Justine Henin	(United States) Serena Williams	7–6^{(7–5)}, 6–4
Berlin	(Belgium) Justine Henin	(Belgium) Kim Clijsters	6–4, 4–6, 7–5
Rome	(Belgium) Kim Clijsters	(France) Amélie Mauresmo	3–6, 7–6^{(7–3)}, 6–0
Toronto	(Belgium) Justine Henin	(Russia) Lina Krasnoroutskaya	6–1, 6–0
Moscow	(Russia) Anastasia Myskina	(France) Amélie Mauresmo	6–2, 6–4
Zurich	(Belgium) Justine Henin	(Serbia and Montenegro) Jelena Dokić	6–0, 6–4

=== 2004 ===
Tournament	Winner	Runner-up	Score
Tokyo	(United States) Lindsay Davenport	(Bulgaria) Magdalena Maleeva	6–4, 6–1
Indian Wells	(Belgium) Justine Henin	(United States) Lindsay Davenport	6–1, 6–4
Miami	(United States) Serena Williams	(Russia) Elena Dementieva	6–1, 6–1
Charleston	(United States) Venus Williams	(Spain) Conchita Martínez	2–6, 6–2, 6–1
Berlin	(France) Amélie Mauresmo	(United States) Venus Williams	Walkover
Rome	(France) Amélie Mauresmo	(United States) Jennifer Capriati	3–6, 6–3, 7–6^{(8–6)}
San Diego	(United States) Lindsay Davenport	(Russia) Anastasia Myskina	6–1, 6–1
Montreal	(France) Amélie Mauresmo	(Russia) Elena Likhovtseva	6–1, 6–0
Moscow	(Russia) Anastasia Myskina	(Russia) Elena Dementieva	7–5, 6–0
Zurich	(Australia) Alicia Molik	(Russia) Maria Sharapova	4–6, 6–2, 6–3

=== 2005 ===
Tournament	Winner	Runner-up	Score
Tokyo	(Russia) Maria Sharapova	(United States) Lindsay Davenport	6–1, 3–6, 7–6^{(7–5)}
Indian Wells	(Belgium) Kim Clijsters	(United States) Lindsay Davenport	6–4, 4–6, 6–2
Miami	(Belgium) Kim Clijsters	(Russia) Maria Sharapova	7–5, 6–3
Charleston	(Belgium) Justine Henin	(Russia) Elena Dementieva	7–5, 6–4
Berlin	(Belgium) Justine Henin	(Russia) Nadia Petrova	6–3, 4–6, 6–3
Rome	(France) Amélie Mauresmo	(Switzerland) Patty Schnyder	2–6, 6–3, 6–4
San Diego	(France) Mary Pierce	(Japan) Ai Sugiyama	6–3, 6–0
Toronto	(Belgium) Kim Clijsters	(Belgium) Justine Henin	7–5, 6–1
Moscow	(France) Mary Pierce	(Italy) Francesca Schiavone	6–4, 6–3
Zurich	(United States) Lindsay Davenport	(Switzerland) Patty Schnyder	7–6, 6–3

=== 2006 ===
Tournament	Winner	Runner-up	Score
Tokyo	(Russia) Elena Dementieva	(Switzerland) Martina Hingis	6–2, 6–0
Indian Wells	(Russia) Maria Sharapova	(Russia) Elena Dementieva	6–1, 6–2
Miami	(Russia) Svetlana Kuznetsova	(Russia) Maria Sharapova	6–4, 6–3
Charleston	(Russia) Nadia Petrova	(Switzerland) Patty Schnyder	6–3, 4–6, 6–1
Berlin	(Russia) Nadia Petrova	(Belgium) Justine Henin	4–6, 6–4, 7–5
Rome	(Switzerland) Martina Hingis	(Russia) Dinara Safina	6–2, 7–5
San Diego	(Russia) Maria Sharapova	(Belgium) Kim Clijsters	7–5, 7–5
Montreal	(Serbia) Ana Ivanovic	(Switzerland) Martina Hingis	6–2, 6–3
Moscow	(Russia) Anna Chakvetadze	(Russia) Nadia Petrova	6–4, 6–4
Zurich	(Russia) Maria Sharapova	(Slovakia) Daniela Hantuchová	6–1, 4–6, 6–3

=== 2007 ===
Tournament	Winner	Runner-up	Score
Tokyo	(Switzerland) Martina Hingis	(Serbia) Ana Ivanovic	6–4, 6–2
Indian Wells	(Slovakia) Daniela Hantuchová	(Russia) Svetlana Kuznetsova	6–3, 6–4
Miami	(United States) Serena Williams	(Belgium) Justine Henin	0–6, 7–5, 6–3
Charleston	(Serbia) Jelena Janković	(Russia) Dinara Safina	6–2, 6–2
Berlin	(Serbia) Ana Ivanovic	(Russia) Svetlana Kuznetsova	3–6, 6–4, 7–6^{(7–4)}
Rome	(Serbia) Jelena Janković	(Russia) Svetlana Kuznetsova	7–5, 6–1
San Diego	(Russia) Maria Sharapova	(Switzerland) Patty Schnyder	6–2, 3–6, 6–0
Toronto	(Belgium) Justine Henin	(Serbia) Jelena Janković	7–6^{(7–3)}, 7–5
Moscow	(Russia) Elena Dementieva	(United States) Serena Williams	5–7, 6–1, 6–1
Zurich	(Belgium) Justine Henin	(France) Tatiana Golovin	6–4, 6–4

=== 2008 ===
Tournament	Winner	Runner-up	Score
Doha	(Russia) Maria Sharapova	(Russia) Vera Zvonareva	6–1, 2–6, 6–0
Indian Wells	(Serbia) Ana Ivanovic	(Russia) Svetlana Kuznetsova	6–4, 6–3
Miami	(United States) Serena Williams	(Serbia) Jelena Janković	6–1, 5–7, 6–3
Charleston	(United States) Serena Williams	(Russia) Vera Zvonareva	6–4, 3–6, 6–3
Berlin	(Russia) Dinara Safina	(Russia) Elena Dementieva	3–6, 6–2, 6–2
Rome	(Serbia) Jelena Janković	(France) Alizé Cornet	6–2, 6–2
Montreal	(Russia) Dinara Safina	(Slovakia) Dominika Cibulková	6–2, 6–1
Tokyo	(Russia) Dinara Safina	(Russia) Svetlana Kuznetsova	6–1, 6–3
Moscow	(Serbia) Jelena Janković	(Russia) Vera Zvonareva	6–2, 6–4

== Singles champions ==
=== Per year ===
Year	Doha	Tokyo	Indian Wells	Miami	Charleston	Berlin	Rome	San Diego	Canada	Moscow	Zurich	Chicago	Boca Raton	Philadelphia
1990	-	-	-	Seles (1/9)	Navratilova (1/3)	Seles (2/9)	Seles (3/9)	-	Graf (1/15)	-	-	Navratilova (2/3)	-	-
1991	-	-	-	Seles (4/9)	Sabatini (1/5)	Graf (2/15)	Sabatini (2/5)	-	Capriati (1/2)	-	-	-	Sabatini (3/5)	-
1992	-	-	-	Sánchez (1/6)	Sabatini (4/5)	Graf (3/15)	Sabatini (5/5)	-	Sánchez (2/6)	-	-	-	Graf (4/15)	-
1993	-	Navratilova (3/3)	-	Sánchez (3/6)	Graf (5/15)	Graf (6/15)	Martínez (1/9)	-	Graf (7/15)	-	Man.Maleeva (1/1)	-	-	Martínez (2/9)
1994	-	Graf (8/15)	-	Graf (9/15)	Martínez (3/9)	Graf (10/15)	Martínez (4/9)	-	Sánchez (4/6)	-	Mag.Maleeva (1/2)	-	-	Huber (1/1)
1995	-	Date (1/1)	-	Graf (11/15)	Martínez (5/9)	Sánchez (5/6)	Martínez (6/9)	-	Seles (5/9)	-	Majoli (1/3)	-	-	Graf (12/15)
1996	-	Majoli (2/3)	Graf (13/15)	Graf (14/15)	Sánchez (6/6)	Graf (15/15)	Martínez (7/9)	-	Seles (6/9)	-	Novotná (1/2)	-	-	-
1997	-	Hingis (1/17)	Davenport (1/11)	Hingis (2/17)	Hingis (3/17)	M.J.Fernandez (1/1)	Pierce (1/5)	-	Seles (7/9)	Novotná (2/2)	Davenport (2/11)	-	-	-
1998	-	Davenport (3/11)	Hingis (4/17)	V.Williams (1/6)	Coetzer (1/1)	Martínez (8/9)	Hingis (5/17)	-	Seles (8/9)	Pierce (2/5)	Davenport (4/11)	-	-	-
1999	-	Hingis (6/17)	S.Williams (1/10)	V.Williams (2/6)	Hingis (7/17)	Hingis (8/17)	V.Williams (3/6)	-	Hingis (9/17)	Tauziat (1/1)	V.Williams (4/6)	-	-	-
2000	-	Hingis (10/17)	Davenport (5/11)	Hingis (11/17)	Pierce (3/5)	Martínez (9/9)	Seles (9/9)	-	Hingis (12/17)	Hingis (13/17)	Hingis (14/17)	-	-	-
2001	-	Davenport (6/11)	S.Williams (2/10)	V.Williams (5/6)	Capriati (2/2)	Mauresmo (1/6)	Dokić (1/2)	-	S.Williams (3/10)	Dokić (2/2)	Davenport (7/11)	-	-	-
2002	-	Hingis (15/17)	Hantuchová (1/2)	S.Williams (4/10)	Majoli (3/3)	Henin (1/10)	S.Williams (5/10)	-	Mauresmo (2/6)	Mag.Maleeva (2/2)	Schnyder (1/1)	-	-	-
2003	-	Davenport (8/11)	Clijsters (1/5)	S.Williams (6/10)	Henin (2/10)	Henin (3/10)	Clijsters (2/5)	-	Henin (4/10)	Myskina (1/2)	Henin (5/10)	-	-	-
2004	-	Davenport (9/11)	Henin (6/10)	S.Williams (7/10)	V.Williams (6/6)	Mauresmo (3/6)	Mauresmo (4/6)	Davenport (10/11)	Mauresmo (5/6)	Myskina (2/2)	Molik (1/1)	-	-	-
2005	-	Sharapova (1/6)	Clijsters (3/5)	Clijsters (4/5)	Henin (7/10)	Henin (8/10)	Mauresmo (6/6)	Pierce (4/5)	Clijsters (5/5)	Pierce (5/5)	Davenport (11/11)	-	-	-
2006	-	Dementieva (1/2)	Sharapova (2/6)	Kuznetsova (1/1)	Petrova (1/2)	Petrova (2/2)	Hingis (16/17)	Sharapova (3/6)	Ivanovic (1/3)	Chakvetadze (1/1)	Sharapova (4/6)	-	-	-
2007	-	Hingis (17/17)	Hantuchová (2/2)	S.Williams (8/10)	Janković (1/4)	Ivanovic (2/3)	Janković (2/4)	Sharapova (5/6)	Henin (9/10)	Dementieva (2/2)	Henin (10/10)	-	-	-
2008	Sharapova (6/6)	Safina (3/3)	Ivanovic (3/3)	S.Williams (9/10)	S.Williams (10/10)	Safina (1/3)	Janković (3/4)	-	Safina (2/3)	Janković (4/4)	-	-	-	-
Year	Doha	Tokyo	Indian Wells	Miami	Charleston	Berlin	Rome	San Diego	Canada	Moscow	Zurich	Chicago	Boca Raton	Philadelphia

=== Per player ===
Rank	Player	DOH	IND	MIA	CHA	BER	ROM	CAN	TOK	MOS	SAN	ZUR	CHI	BOC	PHI	Total
1	(Switzerland) Martina Hingis	-	1	2	2	1	2	2	5	1	-	1	-	-	-	17
2	(Germany) Steffi Graf	-	1	3	1	5	-	2	1	-	-	-	-	1	1	15
3	(United States) Lindsay Davenport	-	2	-	-	-	-	-	4	-	1	4	-	-	-	11
4	(Belgium) Justine Henin	-	1	-	2	3	-	2	-	-	-	2	-	-	-	10
4	(United States) Serena Williams	-	2	5	1	-	1	1	-	-	-	-	-	-	-	10
6	(Spain) Conchita Martínez	-	-	-	2	2	4	-	-	-	-	-	-	-	1	9
6	(Socialist Federal Republic of Yugoslavia) / (United States) Monica Seles	-	-	2	-	1	2	4	-	-	-	-	-	-	-	9
8	(France) Amélie Mauresmo	-	-	-	-	2	2	2	-	-	-	-	-	-	-	6
8	(Spain) Arantxa Sánchez Vicario	-	-	2	1	1	-	2	-	-	-	-	-	-	-	6
8	(Russia) Maria Sharapova	1	1	-	-	-	-	-	1	-	2	1	-	-	-	6
8	(United States) Venus Williams	-	-	3	1	-	1	-	-	-	-	1	-	-	-	6
12	(Argentina) Gabriela Sabatini	-	-	-	2	-	2	-	-	-	-	-	-	1	-	5
12	(Belgium) Kim Clijsters	-	2	1	-	-	1	1	-	-	-	-	-	-	-	5
12	(France) Mary Pierce	-	-	-	1	-	1	-	-	2	1	-	-	-	-	5
15	(Serbia) Jelena Janković	-	-	-	1	-	2	-	-	1	-	-	-	-	-	4
16	(Serbia) Ana Ivanovic	-	1	-	-	1	-	1	-	-	-	-	-	-	-	3
16	(Croatia) Iva Majoli	-	-	-	1	-	-	-	1	-	-	1	-	-	-	3
16	(United States) Martina Navratilova	-	-	-	1	-	-	-	1	-	-	-	1	-	-	3
16	(Russia) Dinara Safina	-	-	-	-	1	-	1	1	-	-	-	-	-	-	3
20	(United States) Jennifer Capriati	-	-	-	1	-	-	1	-	-	-	-	-	-	-	2
20	(Russia) Elena Dementieva	-	-	-	-	-	-	-	1	1	-	-	-	-	-	2
20	(Serbia and Montenegro) Jelena Dokić	-	-	-	-	-	1	-	-	1	-	-	-	-	-	2
20	(Slovakia) Daniela Hantuchová	-	2	-	-	-	-	-	-	-	-	-	-	-	-	2
20	(Bulgaria) Magdalena Maleeva	-	-	-	-	-	-	-	-	1	-	1	-	-	-	2
20	(Russia) Anastasia Myskina	-	-	-	-	-	-	-	-	2	-	-	-	-	-	2
20	(Czech Republic) Jana Novotná	-	-	-	-	-	-	-	-	1	-	1	-	-	-	2
20	(Russia) Nadia Petrova	-	-	-	1	1	-	-	-	-	-	-	-	-	-	2
28	(Russia) Anna Chakvetadze	-	-	-	-	-	-	-	-	1	-	-	-	-	-	1
28	(South Africa) Amanda Coetzer	-	-	-	1	-	-	-	-	-	-	-	-	-	-	1
28	(Japan) Kimiko Date	-	-	-	-	-	-	-	1	-	-	-	-	-	-	1
28	(United States) Mary Joe Fernandez	-	-	-	-	1	-	-	-	-	-	-	-	-	-	1
28	(Germany) Anke Huber	-	-	-	-	-	-	-	-	-	-	-	-	-	1	1
28	(Russia) Svetlana Kuznetsova	-	-	1	-	-	-	-	-	-	-	-	-	-	-	1
28	(Bulgaria) Manuela Maleeva-Fragnière	-	-	-	-	-	-	-	-	-	-	1	-	-	-	1
28	(Australia) Alicia Molik	-	-	-	-	-	-	-	-	-	-	1	-	-	-	1
28	(Switzerland) Patty Schnyder	-	-	-	-	-	-	-	-	-	-	1	-	-	-	1
28	(France) Nathalie Tauziat	-	-	-	-	-	-	-	-	1	-	-	-	-	-	1

- DOH = Doha, IND = Indian Wells, MIA = Miami, CHA = Charleston, BER = Berlin, ROM = Rome, CAN = Canada, TOK = Tokyo, MOS = Moscow, SAN = San Diego, ZUR = Zürich, CHI = Chicago, BOC = Boca Raton, PHI = Philadelphia.
- Miami before 2000 was held in Key-Biscayne, Charleston before 2001 was held in Hilton Head, Tokyo in 1993 was held in Yokohama; Chicago has been a Tier I only in 1990, Boca Raton in 1991 and 1992, Philadelphia from 1993 to 1995, Zürich from 1993 to 2007 and San Diego from 2004 to 2007.

== Tier I records & statistics ==
=== Singles ===
- The most titles won: (Switzerland) Martina Hingis, 17
- The most final appearances: (Switzerland) Martina Hingis, 27
- The most wins of a particular Tier I tournament: 5 (Germany) Steffi Graf, Berlin (1991-1994, 1996) (Switzerland) Martina Hingis, Tokyo (1997, 1999-2000, 2002, 2007) (United States) Serena Williams, Miami (2002-2004, 2007–2008)
- The most consecutive wins of a particular Tier I tournament:

(Germany) Steffi Graf, Berlin, 4 (1991—1994)
(Spain) Conchita Martinez, Rome, 4 (1993-1996)
(United States) Monica Seles, Canadian Open, 4 (1995—1998)

Fastest to...

- 5 titles: in 1 year, (Switzerland) Hingis (Tokyo 2000 - Zurich 2000)
- 10 titles: in 3 years, (Switzerland) Hingis (Tokyo 1997 - Tokyo 2000)
- 15 titles: in 5 years, (Switzerland) Hingis (Tokyo 1997 - Tokyo 2002)
- 17 titles: in 12 years, (Switzerland) Hingis (Tokyo 1997 - Tokyo 2008)
- Quadruple titles:

Tokyo—Miami—Canada—Zurich ("The Hard Quadruple") (Switzerland) Hingis, 2000

- Triple titles:

Indian Wells—Miami—Canada ("The Hard Triple") (Belgium) Clijsters, 2005
Indian Wells—San Diego—Zurich ("The Hard Triple") (Russia) Sharapova, 2006

- Double titles:

Canada - Miami (Hard)	(Spain) Sanchez Vicario	1992
Canada — Tokyo (Hard)	(Switzerland) Hingis	1999
Canada - Indian Wells (Hard)	(United States) S Williams	2001
Canada - Zurich (Hard)	(Belgium) Henin	2003
Indian Wells - Miami (Hard)	(Belgium) Clijsters	2005
Indian Wells - San Diego (Hard)	(Russia) Sharapova	2006
San Diego - Moscow (Hard)	(France) Pierce	2005
Tokyo - Miami (Hard)	(West Germany) Graf	1994
Tokyo - Miami (Hard)	(Switzerland) Hingis	1997
Tokyo - Zurich (Hard)	(United States) Davenport	1998, 2001
Zurich - Miami (Hard)	(United States) V Williams	1999

Charleston - Berlin (Clay)	(Belgium) Henin	2003, 2005
Charleston - Berlin (Clay)	(Russia) Petrova	2006
Berlin — Rome (Clay)	(Socialist Federal Republic of Yugoslavia) Seles	1990
Berlin — Rome (Clay)	(France) Mauresmo	2004
Hilton Head — Rome (Clay)	(Argentina) Sabatini	1992
Hilton Head - Rome (Clay)	(Spain) Martinez	1994, 1995
Hilton Head — Berlin (Clay)	(West Germany) Graf	1993
Hilton Head - Berlin (Clay)	(Switzerland) Hingis	1999

Winners of 6 series tournaments on hard:

- (Switzerland) Hingis (Tokyo 96, Miami 97, Indian Wells 98, Canada 99, Zurich 00, Moscow 00).

Winners of 5 series tournaments on hard:

- (Russia) Sharapova (Tokyo 05, Indian Wells 06, San Diego 06, Zurich 06, Doha 08).

Winners of 3 series tournaments on clay:

- (Spain) Martinez (Rome 93, Hilton Head 94, Berlin 98).
- (Switzerland) Hingis (Hilton Head 97, Rome 98, Berlin 99).

Winners of the series tournaments on three surfaces:

- (United States) Navratilova (Chicago 90, Hilton Head 90, Tokyo 93).

A number of players hold records for winning the tournaments multiple times, while other records are achieved for successive tournament wins, mini-combination victories amongst others.

- Conchita Martínez won the Italian Open four straight times, from 1993 to 1996, and reached the final in 1997.
- Martina Hingis has won all the different Tier I tournaments except for the San Diego event, which became a Tier I event in 2004, during her three-year withdrawal from the sport which ended in late 2005.
