= 1988 Citibank Open – Doubles =

Doubles
- 1988 Citibank Open

Final
- Champions: (Spain) Sergio Casal (Spain) Emilio Sánchez
- Runners-up: (Mexico) Jorge Lozano (United States) Todd Witsken
- Score: 7–6^{(7–4)}, 7–6^{(7–4)}

Events
Singles	Doubles
← 1987 ·	ATP Itaparica	· 1989 →

Sergio Casal and Emilio Sánchez successfully defended their title, by defeating Jorge Lozano and Todd Witsken 7–6^{(7–4)}, 7–6^{(7–4)} in the final.

== Seeds ==
1. (Spain) Sergio Casal / (Spain) Emilio Sánchez (champions)
2. (Mexico) Jorge Lozano / (United States) Todd Witsken (final)
3. (Argentina) Horacio de la Peña / (Argentina) Roberto Saad (first round)
4. (Uruguay) Diego Pérez / (Spain) Javier Sánchez (first round)

== Draw ==
=== Key ===
- Q = Qualifier
- WC = Wild card
- LL = Lucky loser
- Alt = Alternate
- SE = Special exempt
- PR = Protected ranking
- ITF = ITF entry
- JE = Junior exempt
- w/o = Walkover
- r = Retired
- d = Defaulted
- SR = Special ranking

=== Draw ===
First Round
1	(Spain) S Casal (Spain) E Sánchez	6	6
(Brazil) A Hocevar (Brazil) C Kist	3	2
(Brazil) M Barbosa (Brazil) R Camargo	5	4
(Peru) P Arraya (Peru) J Yzaga	7	6
3	(Argentina) H de la Peña (Argentina) R Saad	5	6
(Argentina) P Albano (Chile) C Araya	7	7
(Argentina) J Frana (Argentina) A Mancini	4	4
(Brazil) D Marcelino (Brazil) M Menezes	6	6
WC	(Brazil) N Aerts (Argentina) E Bengoechea	6	4	1
(Uruguay) M Filippini (Brazil) C Motta	2	6	6
(Brazil) R Acioly (Brazil) D Campos	6	6
4	(Uruguay) D Pérez (Spain) J Sánchez	3	2
(Sweden) C Allgårdh (Chile) P Rebolledo	2	1
(Brazil) I Kley (Brazil) F Roese	6	6
(Argentina) M Ingaramo (Argentina) M Jaite	2	4
2	(Mexico) J Lozano (United States) T Witsken	6	6

Quarterfinals
1	(Spain) S Casal (Spain) E Sánchez	4	6	6
(Peru) P Arraya (Peru) J Yzaga	6	0	3
(Argentina) P Albano (Chile) C Araya	5	3
(Brazil) D Marcelino (Brazil) M Menezes	7	6
(Uruguay) M Filippini (Brazil) C Motta	6	3	1
(Brazil) R Acioly (Brazil) D Campos	4	6	6
(Brazil) I Kley (Brazil) F Roese	6	0
2	(Mexico) J Lozano (United States) T Witsken	7	6

Semifinals
1	(Spain) S Casal (Spain) E Sánchez	6	6
(Brazil) D Marcelino (Brazil) M Menezes	4	3
(Brazil) R Acioly (Brazil) D Campos	6	2	4
2	(Mexico) J Lozano (United States) T Witsken	3	6	6

Final
1	(Spain) S Casal (Spain) E Sánchez	7^{7}	7^{7}
2	(Mexico) J Lozano (United States) T Witsken	6^{4}	6^{4}
