= 1988 Citibank Open =

- Date: 21–27 November
- Edition: 3rd
- Category: Grand Prix
- Draw: 32S / 16D
- Prize money: $275,000
- Surface: Hard / court
- Location: Itaparica, Brazil

Champions

Singles
- (Peru) Jaime Yzaga

Doubles
- (Spain) Sergio Casal / (Spain) Emilio Sánchez
← 1987 ·	ATP Itaparica	· 1989 →

The 1988 Citibank Open was a men's tennis tournament played on outdoor hard courts in Itaparica, Brazil that was part of the 1988 Nabisco Grand Prix. It was the third edition of the tournament and took place from 21 November through 27 November 1988. Unseeded Jaime Yzaga won the singles title.

== Finals ==
=== Singles ===
(Peru) Jaime Yzaga defeated (Argentina) Javier Frana 7–6^{(7–4)}, 6–2

- It was Yzaga's 1st singles title of the year and the 3rd of his career.

=== Doubles ===
(Spain) Sergio Casal / (Spain) Emilio Sánchez defeated (Mexico) Jorge Lozano / (United States) Todd Witsken 7–6^{(7–4)}, 7–6^{(7–4)}
