= 1987 Sul America Open =

- Date: 23–29 November
- Edition: 2nd
- Category: Grand Prix
- Draw: 32S / 16D
- Prize money: $450,000
- Surface: Hard / court
- Location: Itaparica, Brazil

Champions

Singles
- (United States) Andre Agassi

Doubles
- (Spain) Sergio Casal / (Spain) Emilio Sánchez
← 1986 ·	ATP Itaparica	· 1988 →

The 1987 Sul America Open was a men's tennis tournament played on outdoor hard courts in Itaparica, Brazil that was part of the 1987 Nabisco Grand Prix. It was the second edition of the tournament and took place from 23 November through 29 November 1987. Eighth-seeded Andre Agassi, who entered on a wildcard, won the singles title.

== Finals ==
=== Singles ===
(United States) Andre Agassi defeated (Brazil) Luiz Mattar 7–6, 6–2

- It was Agassi's first singles title of his career.

=== Doubles ===
(Spain) Sergio Casal / (Spain) Emilio Sánchez defeated (Mexico) Jorge Lozano / (Uruguay) Diego Pérez 6–2, 6–2
