= 1987 Sul America Open – Singles =

Singles
- 1987 Sul America Open

Final
- Champion: (United States) Andre Agassi
- Runner-up: (Brazil) Luiz Mattar
- Score: 7–6, 6–2

Details
- Draw: 32 (3WC/4Q/1LL)
- Seeds: 8

Events
Singles	Doubles
← 1986 ·	ATP Itaparica	· 1988 →

Andrés Gómez was the defending champion, but lost in quarterfinals to Tomáš Šmíd.

Wild Card Andre Agassi won the title by defeating Luiz Mattar 7–6, 6–2 in the final.

== Seeds ==
1. (Ecuador) Andrés Gómez (quarterfinals)
2. (United States) Brad Gilbert (quarterfinals)
3. (Argentina) Martín Jaite (semifinals)
4. (Spain) Emilio Sánchez (second round)
5. (Israel) Amos Mansdorf (first round)
6. (Argentina) Guillermo Pérez Roldán (first round)
7. (Czechoslovakia) Tomáš Šmíd (semifinals)
8. (United States) Andre Agassi (champion)

== Draw ==
=== Key ===
- Q = Qualifier
- WC = Wild card
- LL = Lucky loser
- Alt = Alternate
- SE = Special exempt
- PR = Protected ranking
- ITF = ITF entry
- JE = Junior exempt
- w/o = Walkover
- r = Retired
- d = Defaulted
- SR = Special ranking

=== Finals ===
Semifinals
7	(Czechoslovakia) Tomáš Šmíd	6	6	4
(Brazil) Luiz Mattar	4	7	6
3	(Argentina) Martín Jaite	2	5
8/WC	(United States) Andre Agassi	6	7

Final
(Brazil) Luiz Mattar	6	2
8/WC	(United States) Andre Agassi	7	6

=== Top half ===
First round
1	(Ecuador) A Gómez	6	7
(United States) D Rostagno	3	6
(West Germany) R Osterthun	6	4	7
(Spain) J Aguilera	2	6	6
(Argentina) G Vilas	6	2
(Spain) J Sánchez	7	6
(Chile) P Rebolledo	3	0
7	(Czechoslovakia) T Šmíd	6	6
4	(Spain) E Sánchez	6	6
(Mexico) J Lozano	3	4
(Czechoslovakia) M Šrejber	4	6	3
(Spain) S Casal	6	3	6
(Brazil) L Mattar	6	6	6
Q	(Brazil) I Kley	4	7	3
WC	(Brazil) C Motta	3	6	6
5	(Israel) A Mansdorf	6	3	0

Second round
1	(Ecuador) A Gómez	6	6
(West Germany) R Osterthun	2	1
(Spain) J Sánchez	6	6	4
7	(Czechoslovakia) T Šmíd	3	7	6
4	(Spain) E Sánchez	4	2
(Spain) S Casal	6	6
(Brazil) L Mattar	6	6
WC	(Brazil) C Motta	1	2

Quarterfinals
1	(Ecuador) A Gómez	6	6
7	(Czechoslovakia) T Šmíd	7	7
(Spain) S Casal	5	7	6
(Brazil) L Mattar	7	5	7

Semifinals
7	(Czechoslovakia) T Šmíd	6	6	4
(Brazil) L Mattar	4	7	6

=== Bottom half ===
First round
6	(Argentina) G Pérez Roldán	2	0
(West Germany) T Meinecke	6	6
(Socialist Federal Republic of Yugoslavia) B Orešar	5	6	4
Q	(Israel) G Bloom	7	1	6
LL	(Uruguay) D Pérez	6	6
(Austria) H Skoff	4	2
(Peru) P Arraya	3	6	1
3	(Argentina) M Jaite	6	3	6
8/WC	(United States) A Agassi	5	6	6
WC	(Brazil) J Daher	7	0	3
(Spain) A Tous	2	4
(Peru) J Yzaga	6	6
(Argentina) H de la Peña	4	2
Q	(Brazil) D Marcelino	6	6
Q	(Argentina) R Saad	7	6	2
2	(United States) B Gilbert	5	7	6

Second round
(West Germany) T Meinecke	7	6
Q	(Israel) G Bloom	5	0
LL	(Uruguay) D Pérez	6	3
3	(Argentina) M Jaite	7	6
8/WC	(United States) A Agassi	6	6
(Peru) J Yzaga	3	4
Q	(Brazil) D Marcelino	6	2
2	(United States) B Gilbert	7	6

Quarterfinals
(West Germany) T Meinecke	2	2
3	(Argentina) M Jaite	6	6
8/WC	(United States) A Agassi	6	6
2	(United States) B Gilbert	1	3

Semifinals
3	(Argentina) M Jaite	2	5
8/WC	(United States) A Agassi	6	7
