= 1987 Sul America Open – Doubles =

Doubles
- 1987 Sul America Open

Final
- Champions: (Spain) Sergio Casal (Spain) Emilio Sánchez
- Runners-up: (Mexico) Jorge Lozano (Uruguay) Diego Pérez
- Score: 6–2, 6–2

Events
Singles	Doubles
← 1986 ·	ATP Itaparica	· 1988 →

Chip Hooper and Mike Leach were the defending champions, but none competed this year.

Sergio Casal and Emilio Sánchez won the title by defeating Jorge Lozano and Diego Pérez 6–2, 6–2 in the final.

== Seeds ==
1. (Spain) Sergio Casal / (Spain) Emilio Sánchez (champions)
2. (United States) Ken Flach / (Czechoslovakia) Tomáš Šmíd (semifinals)
3. (Mexico) Jorge Lozano / (Uruguay) Diego Pérez (final)
4. (Chile) Hans Gildemeister / (Brazil) Cássio Motta (quarterfinals)

== Draw ==
=== Key ===
- Q = Qualifier
- WC = Wild card
- LL = Lucky loser
- Alt = Alternate
- ITF = ITF entry
- PR = Protected ranking
- SR = Special ranking
- SE = Special exempt
- JE = Junior exempt
- JR = Junior Accelerator Programme entrant
- CO = College Accelerator Programme entrant
- NG = Next Gen Accelerator Program entrant
- w/o = Walkover
- r = Retired
- d = Defaulted

=== Draw ===
First round
1	(Spain) S Casal (Spain) E Sánchez	6	6
(Spain) T Carbonell (Brazil) F Roese	3	4
(Israel) G Bloom (Israel) A Mansdorf	6	6
(Argentina) M Jaite (Spain) J Sánchez	3	4
4	(Chile) H Gildemeister (Brazil) C Motta	7	6
(Brazil) N Aerts (Argentina) R Saad	6	3
(West Germany) T Meinecke (West Germany) R Osterthun	6	3
(Brazil) I Kley (Brazil) D Marcelino	7	6
(Chile) P Rebolledo (Spain) A Tous	1	2
(Brazil) R Acioly (Brazil) L Mattar	6	6
WC	(Brazil) D Campos (Brazil) J Daher	4	3
3	(Mexico) J Lozano (Uruguay) D Pérez	6	6
(Brazil) G Barbosa (Brazil) M Menezes	7	6	6
(Brazil) A Hocevar (Brazil) J Soares	6	7	3
(Peru) C di Laura (Brazil) C Kist	3	4
2	(United States) K Flach (Czechoslovakia) T Šmíd	6	6

Quarterfinals
1	(Spain) S Casal (Spain) E Sánchez	6	6
(Israel) G Bloom (Israel) A Mansdorf	4	4
4	(Chile) H Gildemeister (Brazil) C Motta	6	4	2
(Brazil) I Kley (Brazil) D Marcelino	3	6	6
(Brazil) R Acioly (Brazil) L Mattar	4	6	1
3	(Mexico) J Lozano (Uruguay) D Pérez	6	4	6
(Brazil) G Barbosa (Brazil) M Menezes	3	4
2	(United States) K Flach (Czechoslovakia) T Šmíd	6	6

Semifinals
1	(Spain) S Casal (Spain) E Sánchez	4	6	6
(Brazil) I Kley (Brazil) D Marcelino	6	3	2
3	(Mexico) J Lozano (Uruguay) D Pérez	6	6
2	(United States) K Flach (Czechoslovakia) T Šmíd	4	4

Final
1	(Spain) S Casal (Spain) E Sánchez	6	6
3	(Mexico) J Lozano (Uruguay) D Pérez	2	2
