= 1990 Citibank Open =

- Date: 5–11 November
- Edition: 5th
- Category: World Series
- Draw: 32S / 16D
- Prize money: $225,000
- Surface: Hard / court
- Location: Itaparica, Brazil

Champions

Singles
- (Sweden) Mats Wilander

Doubles
- (Brazil) Mauro Menezes / (Brazil) Fernando Roese
← 1989 ·	ATP Itaparica

The 1990 Citibank Open was a men's tennis tournament played on outdoor hard courts in Itaparica, Brazil that was part of the World Series category of the 1990 ATP Tour. It was the fifth and last edition of the tournament and took place from 5 November through 11 November 1990. Fifth-seeded Mats Wilander, who entered the draw on a wildcard, won the singles title.

After this edition the tournament was moved to Búzios.

== Finals ==
=== Singles ===
(Sweden) Mats Wilander defeated (Uruguay) Marcelo Filippini 6–1, 6–2

- It was Wilander's 1st singles title of the year and the 33rd and last of his career.

=== Doubles ===
(Brazil) Mauro Menezes / (Brazil) Fernando Roese defeated (Spain) Tomás Carbonell / (Spain) Marcos Górriz 7–6, 7–5
