= 1990 Citibank Open – Singles =

Singles
- 1990 Citibank Open

Final
- Champion: (Sweden) Mats Wilander
- Runner-up: (Uruguay) Marcelo Filippini
- Score: 6–1, 6–2

Details
- Draw: 32 (3WC/4Q)
- Seeds: 8

Events
Singles	Doubles
← 1989 ·	ATP Itaparica

Martín Jaite was the defending champion, but lost in the first round to Mark Koevermans.

Mats Wilander won the title by defeating Marcelo Filippini 6–1, 6–2 in the final. It was the 33rd and final singles title for Wilander in his career.

== Seeds ==
1. (Spain) Juan Aguilera (first round)
2. (Argentina) Martín Jaite (first round)
3. (Czechoslovakia) Karel Nováček (second round)
4. (Argentina) Franco Davín (first round)
5. (Sweden) Mats Wilander (champion)
6. (Brazil) Luiz Mattar (second round)
7. (Uruguay) Marcelo Filippini (final)
8. (France) Jean-Philippe Fleurian (second round)

== Draw ==
=== Key ===
- Q = Qualifier
- WC = Wild card
- LL = Lucky loser
- Alt = Alternate
- ITF = ITF entry
- PR = Protected ranking
- SR = Special ranking
- SE = Special exempt
- JE = Junior exempt
- JR = Junior Accelerator Programme entrant
- CO = College Accelerator Programme entrant
- NG = Next Gen Accelerator Program entrant
- w/o = Walkover
- r = Retired
- d = Defaulted

=== Finals ===
Semifinals
7	(Uruguay) Marcelo Filippini	7	6
(Spain) Tomás Carbonell	6	4
5/WC	(Sweden) Mats Wilander	6	6
(Netherlands) Mark Koevermans	4	3

Final
7	(Uruguay) Marcelo Filippini	1	2
5/WC	(Sweden) Mats Wilander	6	6

=== Top half ===
First round
1	(Spain) J Aguilera	6	3
WC	(Brazil) D Marcelino	7	6
(Portugal) N Marques	6	6	6
(Argentina) A Mancini	0	7	4
(Canada) M Wostenholme	2	2
(Peru) J Yzaga	6	6
Q	(Czechoslovakia) T Anzari	2	3
7	(Uruguay) M Filippini	6	6
4	(Argentina) F Davín	6	0
(Spain) T Carbonell	7	6
(Peru) P Arraya	7	3	5
(Spain) JF Altur	6	6	7
(Brazil) C Motta	3	7	6
Q	(Brazil) F Roese	6	6	4
(Argentina) R Azar	3	6	5
6	(Brazil) L Mattar	6	4	7

Second round
WC	(Brazil) D Marcelino	6	1	2
(Portugal) N Marques	3	6	6
(Peru) J Yzaga	2	2
7	(Uruguay) M Filippini	6	6
(Spain) T Carbonell	4	6	6
(Spain) JF Altur	6	1	2
(Brazil) C Motta	6	2	7
6	(Brazil) L Mattar	1	6	5

Quarterfinals
(Portugal) N Marques	3	6	6
7	(Uruguay) M Filippini	6	3	7
(Spain) T Carbonell	6	7
(Brazil) C Motta	3	5

Semifinals
7	(Uruguay) M Filippini	7	6
(Spain) T Carbonell	6	4

=== Bottom half ===
First round
5/WC	(Sweden) M Wilander	6	6
(United States) T Wilkison	2	2
(Portugal) J Cunha e Silva	2	6	6
(Argentina) H de la Peña	6	3	4
(Uruguay) D Pérez	7	3	6
(Canada) A Sznajder	6	6	7
(United States) C Garner	1	4
3	(Czechoslovakia) K Nováček	6	6
8	(France) JP Fleurian	4	6	6
WC	(Brazil) J Oncins	6	1	1
Q	(United States) T Martin	5	6
Q	(Venezuela) M Ruah	7	7
(Spain) C Costa	6	3	2
(Belgium) B Wuyts	2	6	6
(Netherlands) M Koevermans	6	6	6
2	(Argentina) M Jaite	3	7	2

Second round
5/WC	(Sweden) M Wilander	6	6
(Portugal) J Cunha e Silva	2	2
(Canada) A Sznajder	6	6
3	(Czechoslovakia) K Nováček	4	3
8	(France) JP Fleurian	3	3
Q	(Venezuela) M Ruah	6	6
(Belgium) B Wuyts	6	3	5
(Netherlands) M Koevermans	3	6	7

Quarterfinals
5/WC	(Sweden) M Wilander	6	6
(Canada) A Sznajder	1	0
Q	(Venezuela) M Ruah	6	3
(Netherlands) M Koevermans	7	6

Semifinals
5/WC	(Sweden) M Wilander	6	6
(Netherlands) M Koevermans	4	3
