= 1990 Citibank Open – Doubles =

Doubles
- 1990 Citibank Open

Final
- Champions: (Brazil) Mauro Menezes (Brazil) Fernando Roese
- Runners-up: (Spain) Tomás Carbonell (Spain) Marcos Górriz
- Score: 7–6, 7–5

Details
- Draw: 16 (1Q)
- Seeds: 4

Events
Singles	Doubles
← 1989 ·	ATP Itaparica

Rick Leach and Jim Pugh were the defending champions but chose to compete at London during the same week, finishing as runners-up.

Mauro Menezes and Fernando Roese won the title by defeating Tomás Carbonell and Marcos Górriz 7–6, 7–5 in the final.

== Seeds ==
1. (Argentina) Gustavo Luza / (Brazil) Cássio Motta (quarterfinals)
2. (Netherlands) Mark Koevermans / (Brazil) Luiz Mattar (quarterfinals)
3. (Spain) Tomás Carbonell / (Spain) Marcos Górriz (final)
4. (Argentina) Javier Frana / (Uruguay) Diego Pérez (quarterfinals)

== Draw ==
=== Key ===
- Q = Qualifier
- WC = Wild card
- LL = Lucky loser
- Alt = Alternate
- ITF = ITF entry
- PR = Protected ranking
- SR = Special ranking
- SE = Special exempt
- JE = Junior exempt
- JR = Junior Accelerator Programme entrant
- CO = College Accelerator Programme entrant
- NG = Next Gen Accelerator Program entrant
- w/o = Walkover
- r = Retired
- d = Defaulted

=== Draw ===
First round
1	(Argentina) G Luza (Brazil) C Motta	6	3	6
(Czechoslovakia) K Nováček (Italy) G Pozzi	3	6	2
(Brazil) R Acioly (Sweden) M Wilander	6	1	6
(The Bahamas) R Smith (Sweden) T Svantesson	2	6	7
3	(Spain) T Carbonell (Spain) M Górriz	4	6	7
(Czechoslovakia) D Rikl (Czechoslovakia) T Anzari	6	1	6
(United States) B Garnett (United States) T Wilkison	6	6
(Spain) C Costa (France) JP Fleurian	3	2
(Brazil) N Aerts (Brazil) D Marcelino	4	2
(Brazil) M Menezes (Brazil) F Roese	6	6
(United States) S Cannon (Venezuela) A Mora	2	6	4
4	(Argentina) J Frana (Uruguay) D Pérez	6	2	6
Q	(Canada) M Laurendeau (United States) S Patridge	4	7	6
(Argentina) P Albano (Argentina) H de la Peña	6	6	2
(United States) J Canter (New Zealand) B Derlin	5	6
2	(Netherlands) M Koevermans (Brazil) L Mattar	7	7

Quarterfinals
1	(Argentina) G Luza (Brazil) C Motta	2	6	6
(The Bahamas) R Smith (Sweden) T Svantesson	6	3	7
3	(Spain) T Carbonell (Spain) M Górriz	6	6
(United States) B Garnett (United States) T Wilkison	3	4
(Brazil) M Menezes (Brazil) F Roese	4	6	6
4	(Argentina) J Frana (Uruguay) D Pérez	6	3	4
Q	(Canada) M Laurendeau (United States) S Patridge	6	6
2	(Netherlands) M Koevermans (Brazil) L Mattar	3	4

Semifinals
(The Bahamas) R Smith (Sweden) T Svantesson	2	6	6
3	(Spain) T Carbonell (Spain) M Górriz	6	3	7
(Brazil) M Menezes (Brazil) F Roese	2	7	7
Q	(Canada) M Laurendeau (United States) S Patridge	6	6	6

Final
3	(Spain) T Carbonell (Spain) M Górriz	6	5
(Brazil) M Menezes (Brazil) F Roese	7	7
