= 1988 Citibank Open – Singles =

Singles
- 1988 Citibank Open

Final
- Champion: (Peru) Jaime Yzaga
- Runner-up: (Argentina) Javier Frana
- Score: 7–6^{(7–4)}, 6–2

Details
- Draw: 32 (3WC/4Q)
- Seeds: 8

Events
Singles	Doubles
← 1987 ·	ATP Itaparica	· 1989 →

Andre Agassi was the defending champion, but took a rest in order to compete at the Nabisco Masters the following week.

Jaime Yzaga won the title by defeating Javier Frana 7–6^{(7–4)}, 6–2 in the final.

== Seeds ==
1. (Spain) Emilio Sánchez (first round)
2. (Soviet Union) Andrei Chesnokov (quarterfinals)
3. (United States) Aaron Krickstein (second round)
4. (Brazil) Luiz Mattar (First round, retired)
5. (Argentina) Martín Jaite (semifinals)
6. (Argentina) Alberto Mancini (quarterfinals)
7. (Argentina) Horacio de la Peña (second round)
8. (Uruguay) Marcelo Filippini (second round)

== Draw ==
Key

- Q = Qualifier
- WC = Wild card
- LL = Lucky loser
- Alt = Alternate
- ITF = ITF entry
- PR = Protected ranking
- SR = Special ranking
- SE = Special exempt
- JE = Junior exempt
- JR = Junior Accelerator Programme entrant
- CO = College Accelerator Programme entrant
- NG = Next Gen Accelerator Program entrant
- w/o = Walkover
- r = Retired
- d = Defaulted

=== Finals ===
Semifinals
(Argentina) Javier Frana	7	7
(Spain) Javier Sánchez	6	5
5	(Argentina) Martín Jaite	3	4
(Peru) Jaime Yzaga	6	6

Final
(Argentina) Javier Frana	6^{4}	2
(Peru) Jaime Yzaga	7^{7}	6

=== Top half ===
First Round
1	(Spain) E Sánchez	4	4
(Argentina) J Frana	6	6
Q	(Spain) F Clavet	3	0
Q	(Brazil) M Hennemann	6	6
(Ecuador) R Viver	1	7	6
(Uruguay) D Pérez	6	5	7
Q	(Spain) F Roig	6	6	4
7	(Argentina) H de la Peña	3	7	6
3	(United States) A Krickstein	6	3	6
(Argentina) E Bengoechea	1	6	0
(Spain) J Sánchez	6	6
WC	(Brazil) M Menezes	2	2
(Brazil) F Roese	5	1
(Brazil) C Motta	7	6
WC	(Brazil) J Oncins	1	7	0
6	(Argentina) A Mancini	6	6	6

Second Round
(Argentina) J Frana	4	6	7
Q	(Brazil) M Hennemann	6	2	6
(Uruguay) D Pérez	6	6	6
7	(Argentina) H de la Peña	7	2	0
3	(United States) A Krickstein	1	6
(Spain) J Sánchez	6	7
(Brazil) C Motta	6	1	6
6	(Argentina) A Mancini	3	6	7

Quarterfinals
(Argentina) J Frana	4	7	3
(Uruguay) D Pérez	6	5	5^{r}
(Spain) J Sánchez	4	6	6
6	(Argentina) A Mancini	6	3	2

Semifinals
(Argentina) J Frana	7	7
(Spain) J Sánchez	6	5

=== Bottom half ===
First Round
5	(Argentina) M Jaite	6	6
(Argentina) R Azar	0	4
(Peru) P Arraya	7	6
(Sweden) C Allgårdh	6	3
Q	(Brazil) C Kist	6	3	2
(Spain) S Casal	3	6	6
(Brazil) D Marcelino	7	1
4	(Brazil) L Mattar	6	0^{r}
8	(Uruguay) M Filippini	6	6	6
(Argentina) M Ingaramo	7	0	4
WC	(Brazil) R Jabali	4	1
(Peru) J Yzaga	6	6
(United States) J Courier	6	6
(Brazil) I Kley	4	2
(Chile) P Rebolledo	6	5	6
2	(Soviet Union) A Chesnokov	4	7	7

Second Round
5	(Argentina) M Jaite	7	6
(Peru) P Arraya	6	2
(Spain) S Casal	6	6	6
(Brazil) D Marcelino	2	7	4
8	(Uruguay) M Filippini	6	5	0
(Peru) J Yzaga	1	7	6
(United States) J Courier	6	0	1
2	(Soviet Union) A Chesnokov	1	6	6

Quarterfinals
5	(Argentina) M Jaite	6	6
(Spain) S Casal	4	4
(Peru) J Yzaga	7	7
2	(Soviet Union) A Chesnokov	5	6

Semifinals
5	(Argentina) M Jaite	3	4
(Peru) J Yzaga	6	6
