= Maria Filipa de Oliveira =

Afro-Brazilian independence fighter

Maria Felipa de Oliveira
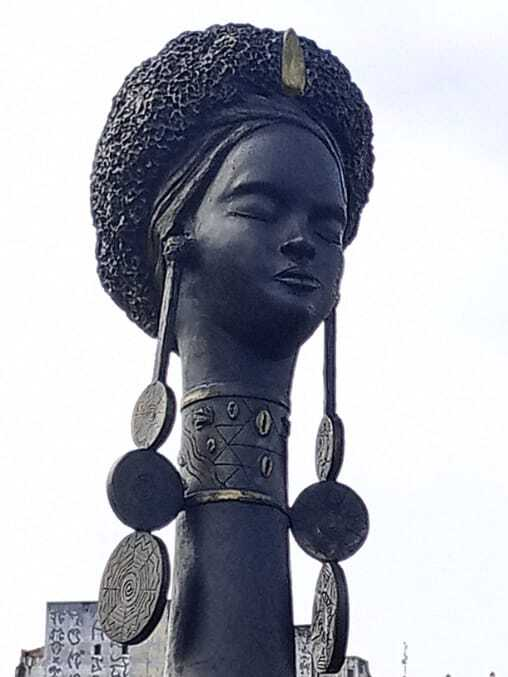
- Monument depicting Filipa
- Died: July 4, 1873; Itaparica, Bahia
- Resting place: Church of Saint Lawrence, Itaparica
- Occupations: guerrilla, fishmonger

Maria Felipa de Oliveira (died July 4, 1873) was an Afro-Brazilian independence fighter. She is believed to be from island of Itaparica, Bahia, and was active during the Brazilian War of Independence. The independence struggle against the Portuguese lasted a little over a year, with many battles centered on Itaparica. Maria Felipa is noted as one of three women who participated in the struggle for Bahia's independence in 1823, the others being the military figure Maria Quitéria (1792–1853) and Sister Joana Angélica (1761–1822).

== Independence struggle ==
The life of Maria Felipa is poorly documented. She was born on Itaparica Island, date unknown, and was a seafood vendor and laborer. She was a freewoman and likely the daughter of an enslaved family of Sudanese descent; by oral tradition, she was a practitioner of capoeira. She led a group of 200 people, primarily women of Afro-Brazilian and of indigenous populations of Tupinambás and Tapuias, in the Battle of Itaparica, January 7–9, 1823. The provisional government of Bahia recommended that residents of the island evacuate, but Maria Felipa and the resistance group remained, likely because of long-standing conflict, known as the mata-marotos, between the Portuguese and ethnic minorities in Bahia.

The resistance group fortified the island by constructed trenches along its broad beaches, sending supplies to the inland Recôncavo region, and watching the coast by both day and night to prevent the landing of Portuguese troops. Ubaldo Osório Pimentel reports that the Maria Felipa's resistance group set fire to some of the 42 Portuguese vessels anchored in the vicinity of the island to invade the city of Salvador. The group is known to have set fire to the Canhoneira Dez de Fevereiro on October 1, 1822, on the Beach of Manguinhos and the Constituição on October 12, 1822, at Praia do Convento. Maria Felipa and other of the independence fought against Portuguese on land in the same period. They used the peixeira, a knife used in the fishmongering trade; and stinging branches of cansanção, any of a number of indigenous species of plants highly poisonous to the skin.

Two watchmen of the vessels, Araújo Mendes and Guimarães das Uvas, were seduced by members of Maria Felipa's group; once nude and drunk, the Portuguese were beaten with cansanção. The "seduction tactic" was similarly carried out in Saubara in the nearby inland city of Santo Amaro. Women in both areas also appeared as souls of the dead wearing masks and sheets, a tactic which caused the Portuguese to flee and enabled women fighters to provide relief supplies to Brazilian troops hiding in remote inland areas.

== Resting place ==
The remains of Maria Felipa are likely located in the Church of Saint Lawrence (Portuguese: Igreja de São Lourenço). Her place of death and burial are poorly documented, but is known to be at the Povoação de Ponta das Baleias, now the historic center of Itaparica.

== Historical documentation ==
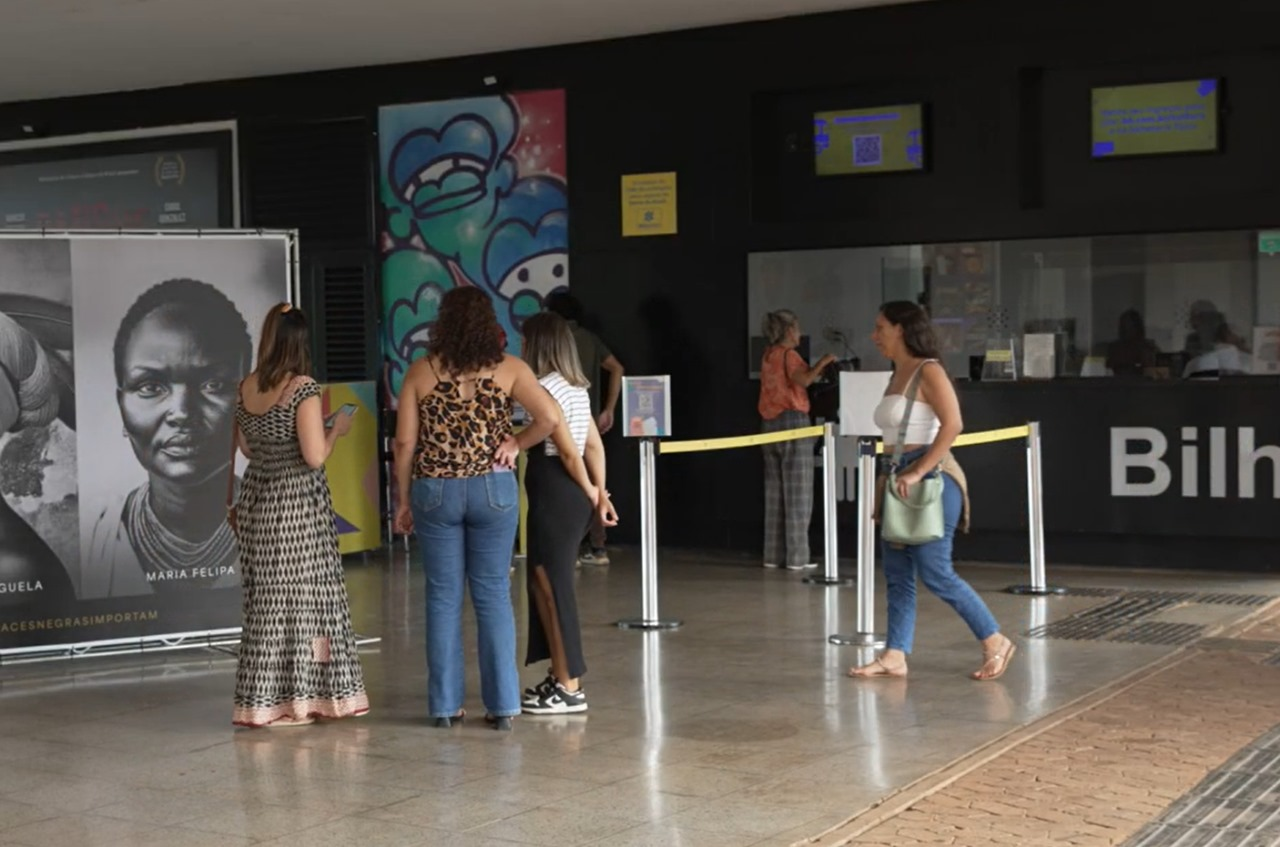
Exhibition featuring historians' AI-created image of Maria Felipa as part of the Faces Negras Importam project at the CCBB (Banco do Brasil Cultural Center) in the Federal District, Brazil.

The activities of the group extended to the day when the flag of Brazil was first raised over the Forte de São Lourenço. Maria Felipa, Joana Soaleira, Brígida do Vale, and a woman known as Marcolina occupied the warehouse of the wealthy Portuguese fish merchant Araújo Mendes.

Historian Ubaldo Osório Pimentel, maternal grandfather of the writer João Ubaldo Ribeiro, verified through public documents that a group of people, mostly women, led by Maria Felipa defended the coast of Itaparica Island against Portuguese repression. In his book A Ilha de Itaparica, published in 1942, historian Ubaldo Osório Pimentel cites the historical figure of Maria Felipa, which is also mentioned in the historical novel O Sargento Pedro [Sergeant Peter], by Xavier Marques.

== Legacy ==
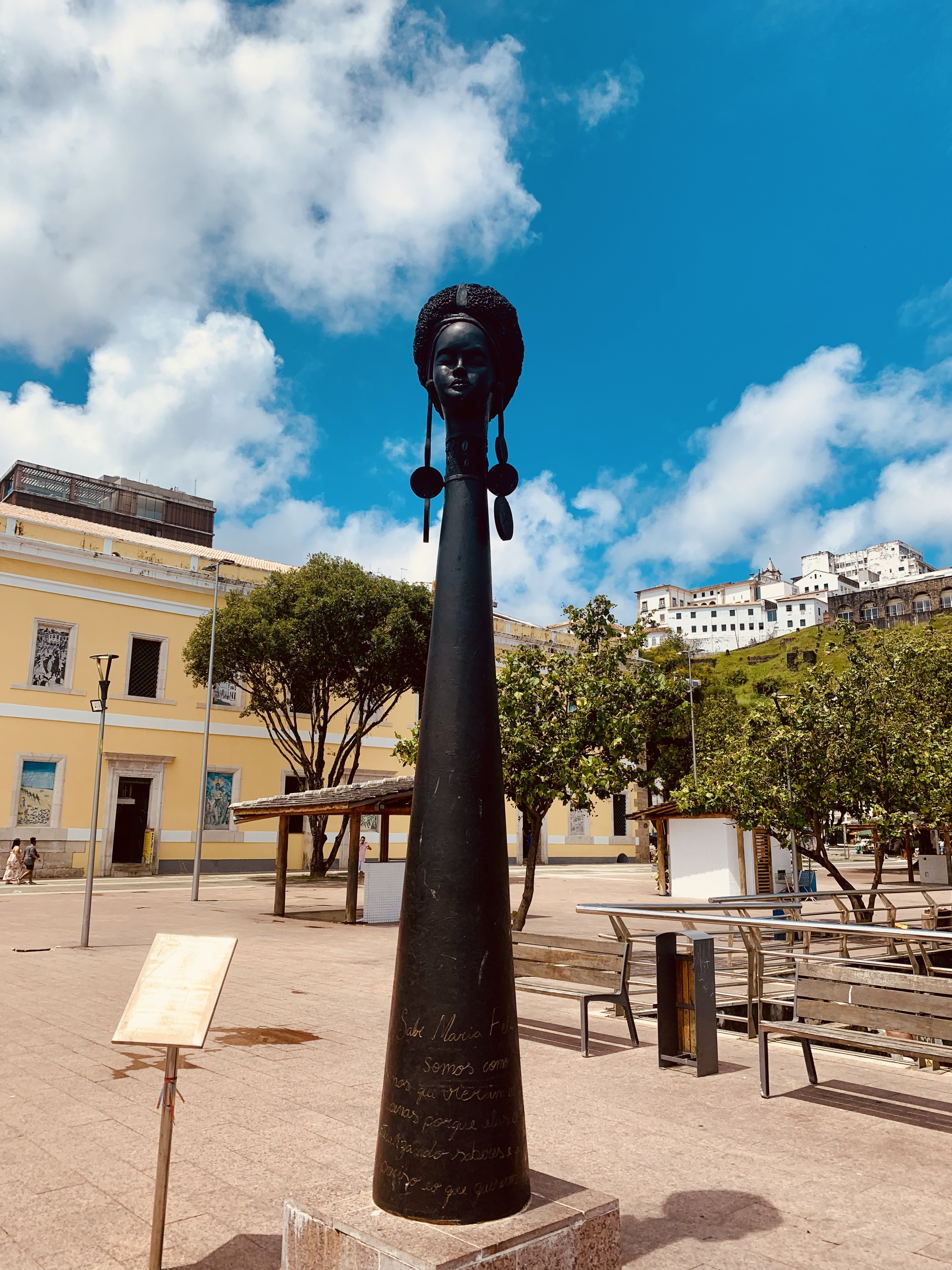
The Coluna à Maria Felipa monument in Salvador, Bahia, Brazil

A biography about her was written by author Jarid Arraes as part of her 2015 cordel collection and book Heroínas Negras Brasileiras em 15 cordéis.

A monument to Maria Felipa was erected in Salvador, Bahia, in 2023, as part of celebrations of 200 years of Brazilian independence.

The community of Itaparica added her name and date of death to a plaque commemorating the heroes of Independence. The date used was given by Ubaldo Osório Pimentel, although no record of her death has been found.

== See also ==
- Joana Angélica
- Maria Quitéria
- Luísa Mahin
- Dandara dos Palmares
- Brazilian War of Independence
