= Portrait of Maria Quitéria de Jesus Medeiros =

1920 painting by Domenico Failutti

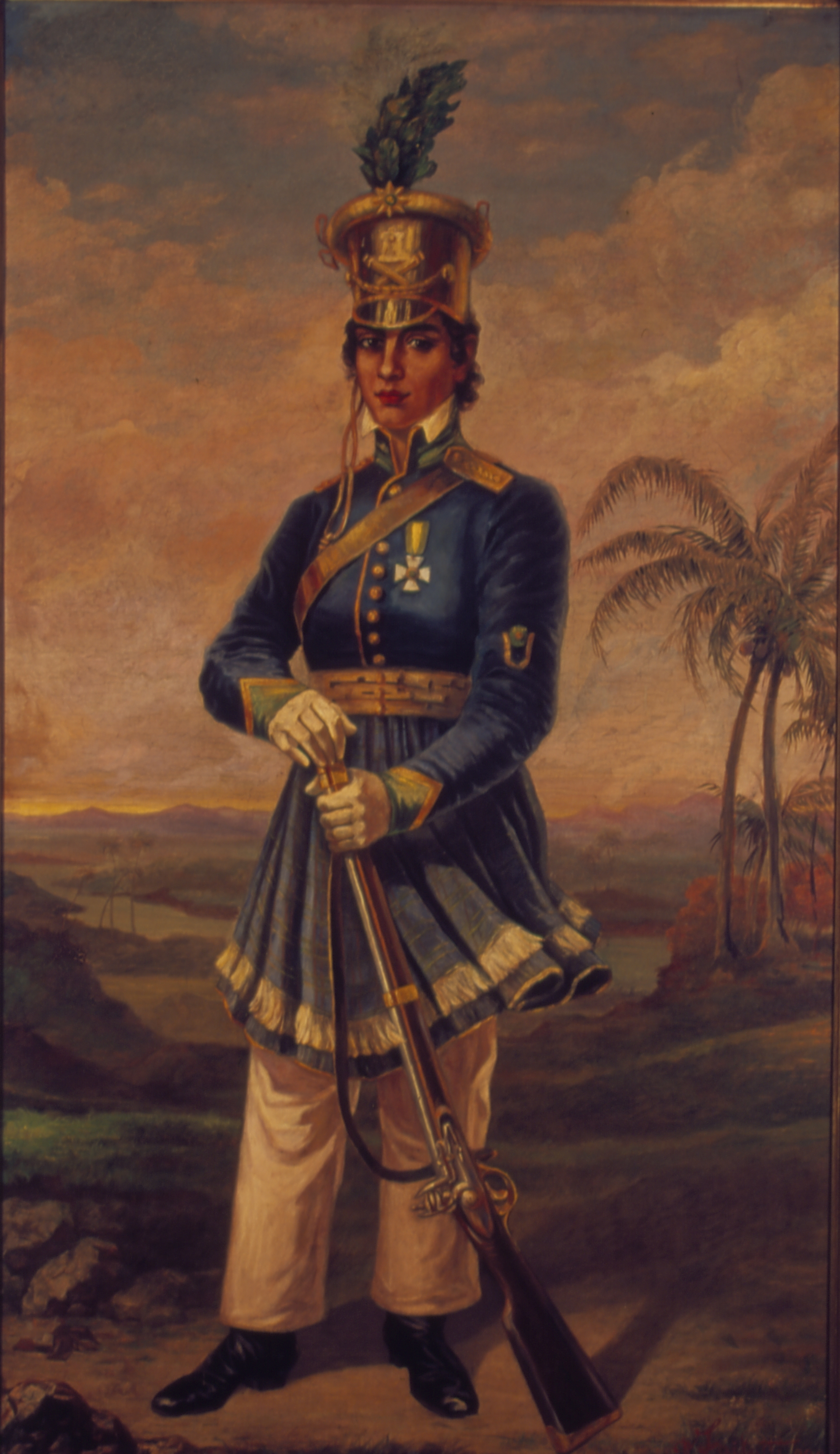
- Artist: Domenico Failutti
- Year: 1920
- Medium: Oil on canvas
- Subject: Maria Quitéria de Jesus
- Dimensions: 233 cm × 133 cm (92 in × 52 in)
- Location: Museu Paulista; São Paulo

Portrait of Maria Quitéria de Jesus Medeiros (Portuguese: Retrato de Maria Quitéria de Jesus Medeiros) is a painting by Domenico Failutti (1872-1923). Failutto, an Italian who worked in Brazil between 1917 and 1922, completed the work in 1920 on the occasion of the centenary of the Independence of Brazil. It depicts Maria Quitéria de Jesus (1792-1853), a combatant and folk hero in the campaign for the Independence of Bahia, a conflict part of the larger Brazilian independence movement.

Quitéria served in the Brazilian War of Independence between 1822 and 1823 dressed as a man. She was subsequently promoted to cadet and Lieutenant, and ultimately decorated with the Imperial order. She, along with Maria Felipa de Oliveira (died 1873) and Sister Joana Angélica (1761-1822) of the Convent of Lapa in Salvador, are known as the three Bahian women resistance fighters in the War of Independence against the Portuguese.

== Description ==
The painting is in oil on canvas. It measures 233 centimetres (92 in) high and 133 centimetres (52 in) wide.

Quitéria is depicted in the painting in military clothing holding a musket. The uniform is typical of the Batalhão dos Periquitos, which got its nickname due to the yellow color on the cuffs and collar of their blue uniform. The background is an idealized landscape of the Bahian Recôncavo, the interior of Bahia immediately near its state capital of Salvador. The Bahian Recôncavo was the stage fighting in which Quitéria participated. The Paraguaçu River is depicted flowing towards the horizon; it connects the interior city of Cachoeira, the scene of the independence movement, to the Bay of All Saints at Salvador.

Maria Quitéria wears the insignia of Knight of the Imperial Order of Cruzeiro on her left breast, a distinction offered by Dom Pedro I to prominent figures in the fight for the Independence of Brazil. The insignia of the Imperial Order is formed by a white star with five forked and maçanetada points; the portrait incorrectly depicts it as a four-pointed star.

== Purchase and display ==
The work was commissioned by the Ipiranga Museum in São Paulo to place in its Hall of Honor, where it remains; Failutti also painted portraits of Sister Joana Angélica and Princess Leopoldina of Brazil (1847-1871) for the museum.
