= Church of Saint Lawrence (Itaparica) =

17th-century church in Bahia, Brazil

- Igreja de São Lourenço
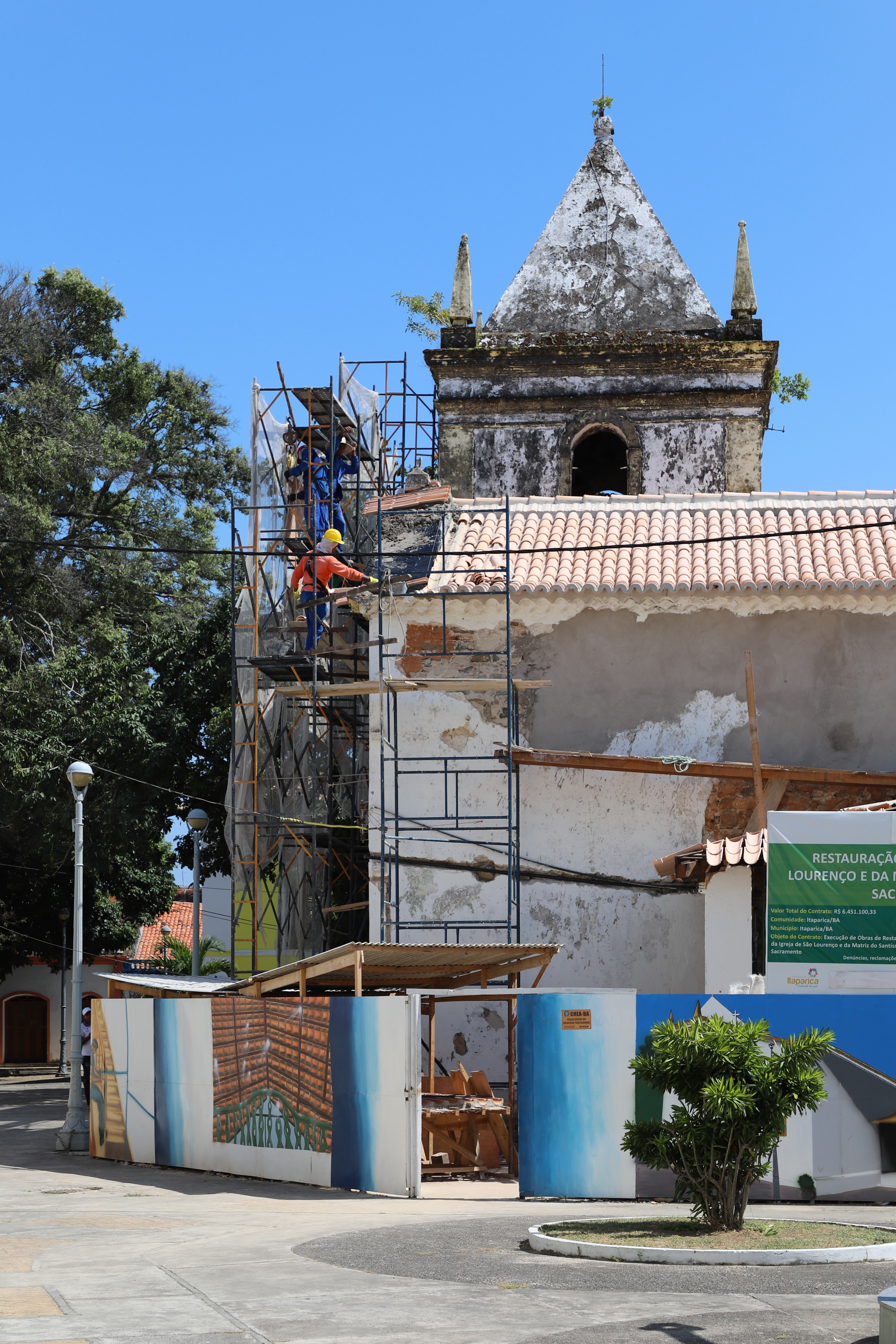

- Location of the Church of Saint Lawrence in Brazil

Religion
- Affiliation: Catholic
- Rite: Roman

Location
- Municipality: Itaparica
- State: Bahia
- Country: Brazil
- Interactive map of Church of Saint Lawrence
- Coordinates: 12.881787°S 38.684761°W

Architecture
- Style: Baroque
- Completed: 1610; 416 years ago

National Historic Heritage of Brazil
- Designated: 1952
- Reference no.: 462

The Church of Saint Lawrence (Igreja de São Lourenço) is a 17th-century Roman Catholic church located in Itaparica, Bahia, Brazil. The church is dedicated to Saint Lawrence, the patron saint of the island of Itaparica. It was built early in the Portuguese settlement of Brazil as part of the plantation of Gabriel Soares de Sousa. The Church of Saint Lawrence was listed as a historic structure by National Institute of Historic and Artistic Heritage (IPHAN) in 1952. 90% of the collection of religious objects and images were stolen from the church in 2010; they were never recovered.

== Location ==
The Church of Saint Lawrence is located at the north of the island of Itaparica. While it was once an isolated plantation church, it is now located within the Historic Center of Itaparica. The church forms part of an architectural set that includes the Parish Church of the Blessed Sacrament (Igreja Matriz do Santíssimo Sacramento) and the Fort of St. Lawrence (Forte de São Lourenço). It faces west on Rua Luís da Grana, and its south elevation faces Praça da Matriz, a small public square; the Parish Church of the Blessed Sacrament is on the same street facing east. The church is separated from the sobrado do Tenente Bottas, a two-story house of the colonial period, by a small yard.

== History ==
The Church of Saint Lawrence was constructed in the 16th century as part of the plantation of Gabriel Soares de Sousa (1540–1591), a Portuguese explorer and naturalist. He describes a chapel as an integral part of his plantation in his Tratado Descritivo do Brasil of 1587. Ubaldo Osório, in A Ilha de Itaparica, states that the church was constructed in 1610, a more likely date of construction. Rocha Pita cites a report from Father Luiz Ferreira that a sermon against the Dutch incursion in Brazil was made from the pulpit of the church; this event dates to approximately 1623. The design of the Church of Saint Lawrence was likely influenced by the Church of Santo Amaro do Catú, also on the island of Itaparica, which has a single nave, corridors, and porch.

The bell tower dates to the late 17th century; its pyramidal endings of towers only appear in Bahia in the second half of the century, notably in S. Antonio de Cairú and Parish Church of Saint Bartholomew. The side corridors seem original to the structure, but the left corridor was modified, possibly in the 19th century.

The church was damaged by the soldiers under General Madeira during the Brazilian was of Independence in 1822. It was abandoned and in ruin by 1941. IPHAN carried out significant restoration works during this period, including reconstruction of the roof, the lining of the main chapel, stabilization of the walls, replacement of cement floors with ceramic tiles and restoration of carpentry and carving. This work was finished in 1944. General restoration work was carried out again in 1977.

=== 2010 Theft ===
A large-scale theft of religious objects in 2010 resulted in the loss of 90% of the collections of the Church of Saint Lawrence and Parish Church of the Blessed Sacrament. 34 of the 41 images and religious objects of the Church of Saint Lawrence were stolen on March 19, 2010. Among the most important pieces stolen were the wooden image of São Elesbão (Saint Kaleb of Axum), at 70 centimetres (28 in) in height, being the only that exists in Brazil. Other items stolen include a golden chalice, monstrance, a wooden crucifix; 17th- and 18th-century images of the Infant Jesus, Saint Francis, Our Lady of the Conception, Lord of Bonfim, and Our Lady of the Rosary were also stolen. Mateus Morbeck of IPHAN described it as "one of the biggest robberies in history."

== Structure ==
The Church of Saint Lawrence consists of a single nave with side aisles and lateral corridors. The walls are of the structure are of brick and mixed masonry; it has a gabled roof with overlapping eaves; a wooden barrel vault is located above the chancel. It demonstrates a transition from the simple rural chapels of the interior of Bahia with "T" floor plans to the larger Parish and Brotherhood churches of the 18th century. Like many plantation churches of the Recôncavo region of Bahia, the church had a covered porch. The porch was removed, but existed at least until 1823. A semi-open porch serves as a vestibule on the right side of the church. The church houses the remains of numerous figures from Itaparica; they likely include those of Maria Felipa de Oliveira (died 1873), an Afro-Brazilian resistance fighter during the Brazilian War of Independence.

== Festival ==
A three-day festival dedicated to Saint Lawrence is held annually in August.

== Protected status ==
The Church of Saint Lawrence was listed as a historic structure by the National Institute of Historic and Artistic Heritage in 1952. Both the structure and its contents were included in the IPHAN directive under inscription number 462. It is an important element of the protected historical center of Itaparica (Conjunto Arquitetônico, Urbanístico e Paisagístico de Itaparica), established in 1980.

== Access ==
The Church of Saint Lawrence is open to the public and may be visited.
