= 1986 Sul America Open =

- Date: 24–30 November
- Edition: 1st
- Category: Grand Prix
- Draw: 32S / 16D
- Prize money: $125,000
- Surface: Hard / court
- Location: Itaparica, Brazil

Champions

Singles
- (Ecuador) Andrés Gómez

Doubles
- (United States) Chip Hooper / (United States) Mike Leach
ATP Itaparica	· 1987 →

The 1986 Sul America Open was a men's tennis tournament played on outdoor hard courts in Itaparica, Brazil that was part of the 1986 Nabisco Grand Prix. It was the inaugural edition of the tournament and took place from 24 November through 30 November 1986. First-seeded Andrés Gómez, who entered on a wildcard, won the singles title.

== Finals ==
=== Singles ===
(Ecuador) Andrés Gómez defeated (France) Jean-Philippe Fleurian 4–6, 6–4, 6–4

- It was Gómez' 4th singles title of the year and the 14th of his career.

=== Doubles ===
(United States) Chip Hooper / (United States) Mike Leach defeated (France) Loïc Courteau / (France) Guy Forget 7–5, 6–3
