= Kelly Jones (tennis) =

American tennis player (born 1964)

- Country (sports): United States
- Residence: Tampa, Florida, US
- Born: March 31, 1964 (age 62) Fort Gordon, Georgia, US
- Height: 1.85 m (6 ft 1 in)
- Turned pro: 1986
- Retired: 1998
- Plays: Right-handed
- Prize money: $1,168,278

Singles
- Career record: 47–83
- Career titles: 2
- Highest ranking: No. 86 (August 13, 1990)

Grand Slam singles results
- Australian Open: 4R (1993)
- French Open: 2R (1990)
- Wimbledon: 3R (1990)
- US Open: 2R (1987, 1988, 1990)

Doubles
- Career record: 220–204
- Career titles: 8
- Highest ranking: No. 1 (October 12, 1992)

Grand Slam doubles results
- Australian Open: F (1992)
- French Open: 2R (1990, 1995, 1996)
- Wimbledon: 3R (1992)
- US Open: F (1992)

Kelly Jones (born March 31, 1964) is an American former doubles world No. 1 tennis player. Jones reached the finals in doubles at the Australian and US Opens in 1992. He was the Head Men's Tennis Coach at Furman University in Greenville, South Carolina from 2011 to 2019. He was replaced by former assistant J.J. Whitlinger.

== Biography ==
Jones played varsity tennis at Pepperdine University from 1982 to 1985, where he won the NCAA Division 1 doubles title in 1984 and 1985. He was a member of the 1984 Los Angeles Olympic Games U.S. tennis team.

Jones joined the professional tour in 1986. He won his first top-level doubles title in 1987 at Auckland.

In 1988, Jones finished runner-up in the mixed doubles at Wimbledon, partnering Gretchen Magers.

Jones was runner-up in the men's doubles at both the Australian Open and the US Open in 1992, partnering Rick Leach. In October that year, he reached the World No. 1 doubles ranking for 1 week.

After 12 years on the professional tour, Jones retired in 1998. During his career, he won eight top-level doubles titles. Jones also won a tour singles event in Singapore, where he captured the title both in 1989 and 1990. His best singles performance at a Grand Slam event was at the 1993 Australian Open, where he reached the fourth round. His career-high singles ranking was World No. 86 (in 1990). Jones' career prize-money earnings totaled US$1,165,009.

Since retiring from the tour, Jones has coached several high-profile players including Mardy Fish, Xavier Malisse and James Blake.

=== Personal life ===
Jones is married to Tami Whitlinger, a former professional tennis player. They have a daughter, Kenna also a professional tennis player.

== Career statistics ==
=== Singles: 2 (2 titles) ===
Result	W/L	Date	Tournament	Surface	Opponent	Score
Win	1–0	May 1989	Singapore	Hard	(Israel) Amos Mansdorf	6–1, 7–5
Win	2–0	May 1990	Singapore	Hard	(Australia) Richard Fromberg	6–4, 2–6, 7–6

=== Doubles: 18 (8 titles, 10 runner-ups) ===
Legend Grand Slam (0–2) Tennis Masters Cup (–) ATP Masters Series (0–1) ATP Championship Series (2–0) ATP Tour (6–7)	Titles by surface Hard (4–5) Clay (1–2) Grass (1–1) Carpet (2–2)

Result	W–L	Date	Tournament	Surface	Partner	Opponents	Score
Win	1–0	Jan 1987	Auckland, New Zealand	Hard	(United States) Brad Pearce	(Australia) Carl Limberger (Australia) Mark Woodforde	7–6, 7–6
Loss	1–1	Feb 1987	Lyon, France	Carpet	(United States) David Pate	(France) Guy Forget (France) Yannick Noah	6–4, 3–6, 4–6
Loss	1–2	Oct 1987	Toulouse, France	Hard (i)	(Germany) Patrik Kühnen	(Poland) Wojtek Fibak (Netherlands) Michiel Schapers	2–6, 4–6
Win	2–2	Jul 1988	Newport, US	Grass	(Sweden) Peter Lundgren	(United States) Scott Davis (United States) Dan Goldie	6–3, 7–6
Loss	2–3	Nov 1989	Johannesburg, South Africa	Hard (i)	(United States) Joey Rive	(United States) Luke Jensen (United States) Richey Reneberg	0–6, 4–6
Win	3–3	Jan 1990	Auckland, New Zealand	Hard	(United States) Robert Van't Hof	(Israel) Gilad Bloom (Netherlands) Paul Haarhuis	7–6, 6–0
Win	4–3	Feb 1990	San Francisco, US	Carpet	(United States) Robert Van’t Hof	(United States) Glenn Layendecker (United States) Richey Reneberg	2–6, 7–6, 6–3
Loss	4–4	Jun 1990	Manchester, UK	Grass	(United Kingdom) Nick Brown	(Australia) Mark Kratzmann (Australia) Jason Stoltenberg	3–6, 6–2, 4–6
Win	5–4	Oct 1990	Lyon, France	Carpet	(United States) Patrick Galbraith	(United States) Jim Grabb (United States) David Pate	7–6, 6–4
Loss	5–5	Nov 1991	Paris, France	Carpet	(United States) Rick Leach	(Australia) John Fitzgerald (Sweden) Anders Järryd	6–3, 3–6, 2–6
Loss	5–6	Jan 1992	Sydney Outdoor, Australia	Hard	(United States) Scott Davis	(Spain) Sergio Casal (Spain) Emilio Sánchez	6–3, 1–6, 4–6
Loss	5–7	Jan 1992	Australian Open, Melbourne, Australia	Hard	(United States) Rick Leach	(Australia) Todd Woodbridge (Australia) Mark Woodforde	4–6, 3–6, 4–6
Win	6–7	Apr 1992	Tokyo Outdoor, Japan	Hard	(United States) Rick Leach	(Australia) John Fitzgerald (Sweden) Anders Järryd	0–6, 7–5, 6–3
Win	7–7	Aug 1992	New Haven, US	Hard	(United States) Rick Leach	(United States) Patrick McEnroe (United States) Jared Palmer	7–6, 6–7, 6–2
Loss	7–8	Sep 1992	US Open, New York City, US	Hard	(United States) Rick Leach	(United States) Jim Grabb (United States) Richey Reneberg	6–3, 6–7, 3–6, 3–6
Loss	7–9	May 1993	Tampa, US	Clay	(United States) Todd Martin	(United States) Jared Palmer (United States) Derrick Rostagno	3–6, 4–6
Loss	7–10	May 1997	Atlanta, US	Clay	(United States) Scott Davis	(Sweden) Jonas Björkman (Sweden) Nicklas Kulti	2–6, 6–7
Win	8–10	May 1997	St. Poelten, Austria	Clay	(United States) Scott Melville	(United States) Luke Jensen (United States) Murphy Jensen	6–2, 7–6

== Doubles performance timeline ==
Key
W	F	SF	QF	#R	RR	Q#	DNQ	A	NH

(W) winner; (F) finalist; (SF) semifinalist; (QF) quarterfinalist; (#R) rounds 4, 3, 2, 1; (RR) round-robin stage; (Q#) qualification round; (DNQ) did not qualify; (A) absent; (NH) not held; (SR) strike rate (events won / competed); (W–L) win–loss record.

Tournament	1984	1985	1986	1987	1988	1989	1990	1991	1992	1993	1994	1995	1996	1997	1998	1999	2000	2001	2002	2003	2004	2005	2006	Career SR	Career win–loss
Grand Slam tournaments
Australian Open	A	A	NH	2R	2R	3R	2R	SF	F	2R	2R	2R	1R	2R	A	A	A	A	A	A	A	A	A	0 / 11	18–11
French Open	A	A	A	A	A	A	2R	A	1R	A	1R	2R	2R	1R	A	A	A	A	A	A	A	A	A	0 / 6	3–6
Wimbledon	A	A	1R	1R	1R	1R	1R	2R	3R	1R	A	2R	1R	1R	A	A	A	A	A	A	A	A	A	0 / 11	4–11
U.S. Open	2R	1R	3R	1R	1R	1R	SF	2R	F	3R	3R	QF	2R	1R	A	A	A	A	A	A	A	A	A	0 / 14	21–14
Grand Slam SR	0 / 1	0 / 1	0 / 2	0 / 3	0 / 3	0 / 3	0 / 4	0 / 3	0 / 4	0 / 3	0 / 3	0 / 4	0 / 4	0 / 4	0 / 0	0 / 0	0 / 0	0 / 0	0 / 0	0 / 0	0 / 0	0 / 0	0 / 0	0 / 42	N/A
Annual win–loss	1–1	0–1	2–2	1–3	1–3	2–3	6–4	6–3	12–4	3–3	3–3	6–4	2–4	1–4	0–0	0–0	0–0	0–0	0–0	0–0	0–0	0–0	0–0	N/A	46–42
ATP Masters Series
Indian Wells	These Tournaments Were Not Masters Series Events Before 1990						QF	SF	1R	1R	A	A	1R	SF	A	A	A	A	A	A	A	A	A	0 / 6	8–6
Miami	These Tournaments Were Not Masters Series Events Before 1990						3R	2R	2R	2R	A	2R	2R	2R	A	A	A	A	A	A	A	A	A	0 / 7	3–7
Monte Carlo	These Tournaments Were Not Masters Series Events Before 1990						A	A	A	A	A	A	A	A	A	A	A	A	A	A	A	A	A	0 / 0	0–0
Rome	These Tournaments Were Not Masters Series Events Before 1990						A	A	1R	A	A	A	2R	A	A	A	A	A	A	A	A	A	A	0 / 2	1–2
Hamburg	These Tournaments Were Not Masters Series Events Before 1990						A	A	2R	A	A	A	A	A	A	A	A	A	A	A	A	A	A	0 / 1	0–1
Canada	These Tournaments Were Not Masters Series Events Before 1990						2R	A	SF	1R	A	1R	2R	2R	A	A	A	A	A	A	A	A	A	0 / 6	5–5
Cincinnati	These Tournaments Were Not Masters Series Events Before 1990						A	A	2R	1R	A	A	2R	A	A	A	A	A	A	A	A	A	A	0 / 3	1–3
Stuttgart (Stockholm)	These Tournaments Were Not Masters Series Events Before 1990						QF	QF	QF	A	A	A	A	A	A	A	A	A	A	A	A	A	A	0 / 3	4–3
Paris	These Tournaments Were Not Masters Series Events Before 1990						2R	F	2R	A	A	A	A	A	A	A	A	A	A	A	A	A	A	0 / 3	5–3
Masters Series SR	N/A						0 / 5	0 / 4	0 / 8	0 / 4	0 / 0	0 / 2	0 / 5	0 / 3	0 / 0	0 / 0	0 / 0	0 / 0	0 / 0	0 / 0	0 / 0	0 / 0	0 / 0	0 / 31	N/A
Annual win–loss	N/A						6–5	9–4	3–8	0–4	0–0	1–2	4–4	4–3	0–0	0–0	0–0	0–0	0–0	0–0	0–0	0–0	0–0	N/A	27–30
Year-end ranking	252	304	94	64	65	135	22	37	5	130	138	87	90	73	–	–	1466	–	–	–	712	967	624	N/A	
