= Maria Quitéria =

Brazilian lieutenant and national heroine

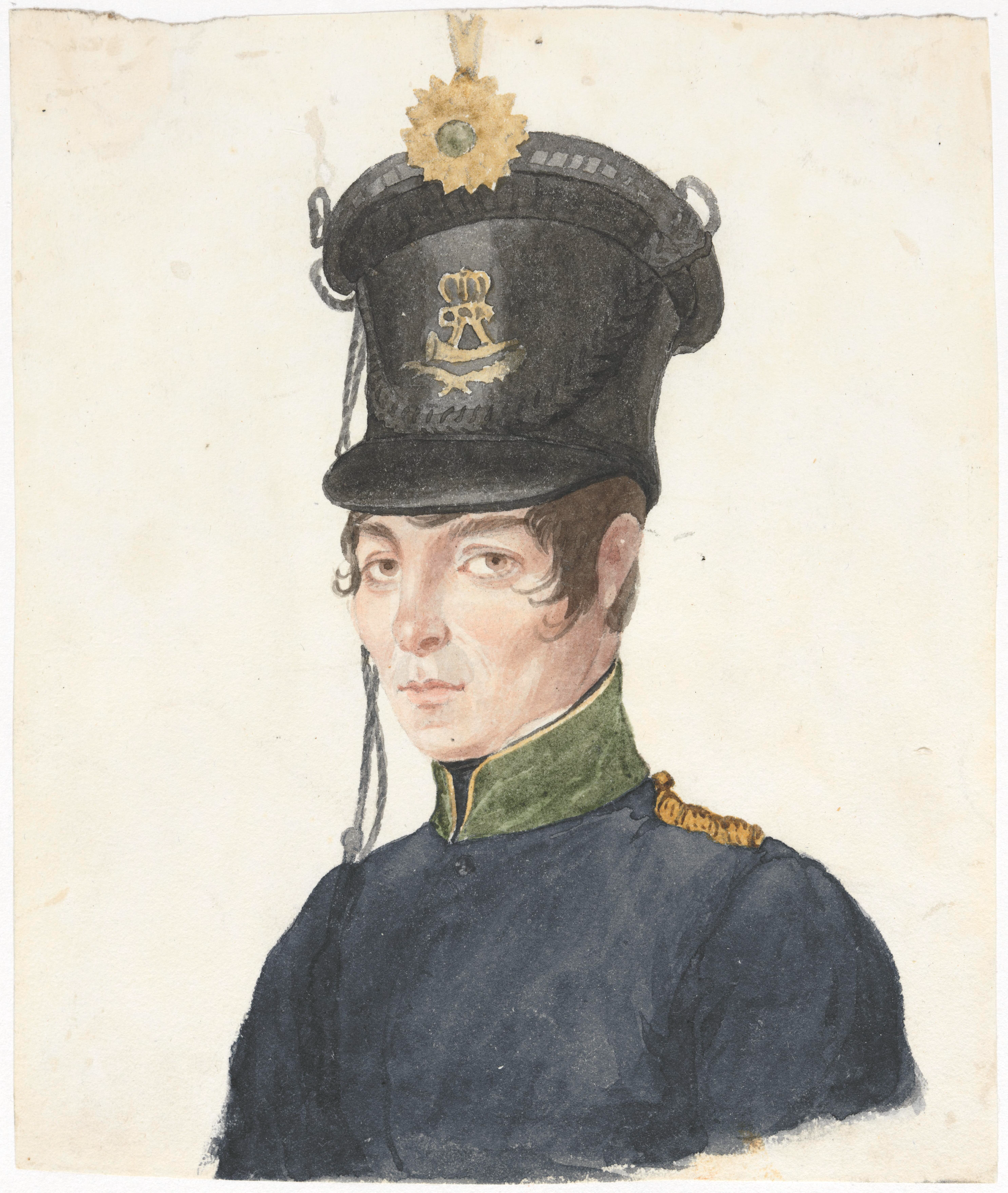
- A female soldier of South America, contemporary depiction by Augustus Earle, c. 1824
- Born: 27 July 1792; Feira de Santana, Bahia, Brazil
- Died: 21 August 1853 (aged 61); Salvador, Bahia, Brazil
- Military career
- Allegiance: Empire of Brazil
- Branch: Imperial Brazilian Army
- Service years: 1823–1824
- Rank: Lieutenant
- Unit: Parakeet Battalion
- Conflicts: Brazilian War of Independence; Siege of Salvador
- Awards: Order of the Southern Cross
- Other work: Farmer

Maria Quitéria de Jesus (27 July 1792 – 21 August 1853) was a Brazilian soldier and national heroine. She served in the Brazilian War of Independence in 1822–24 dressed as a man. She was promoted to cadet and lieutenant and later decorated with the Imperial Order of the Cross. Quitéria has been called the "Brazilian Joan of Arc", and has become a legendary figure in Brazil. Quitéria was the first woman to serve in a military unit in the country. She is known as one of the three Bahia women fighters against the Portuguese along with Maria Filipa de Oliveira (died 1873) and Sister Joana Angélica (1761-1822).

Against her father's will, an unmarried Maria Quitéria enlisted in the Parakeet Battalion, division of the Brazilian Army, as a man, in October 1822. Until June 1823, she fought in several battles against the Portuguese in Bahia, where she lived. Maria Quitéria's father outed her as a woman once he discovered her betrayal—but because of her skill in battle, she was allowed to continue to fight. She was promoted to cadet in July 1823, and then to lieutenant in August, where she was received and decorated by the Emperor.

Few details are known about her life. The historian Aristides Augusto Milton, a childhood friend of the poet Castro Alves, who in turn was a grandson of the major who defended Maria Quitéria for her skill with weapons and recognized military discipline, and incorporated it her to his troops, considered Maria Quitéria "a lady as brave as honest" in his Efemérides Cachoeiranas. She is briefly mentioned by English traveler and writer Maria Graham (later Lady Callcott) in her book Journal of a Voyage to Brazil: "Maria de Jesus is illiterate, but lively. She has clear intelligence and acute perception. I think that if they educated her, she would become a notable personality. One observes nothing masculine in her conduct, rather she is of gentle and friendly manners."

== Personal life ==
Maria Quitéria de Jesus was born on June 27, 1792, in Licurizeiro, in the parish of São José das Itaporocas (now located in Feira de Santana), Bahia. She was the eldest daughter of a farmer, Gonçalo Alves de Almeida, and his wife, Quitéria Maria de Jesus, who died when the young Maria Quitéria was just 10 years old. Her father would go on to remarry on two more occasions, once with Eugenia Maria dos Santos, and later to Rosa Maria de Brito. Although Maria received no formal education, she would have practiced the skills necessary to farming, such as riding, hunting, and using firearms—these skills would serve her in the military as well.

After her time serving in the war, Quitéria married Gabriel Pereira Brito (who was a former lover of hers) and had one daughter with him, named Luisa. Near the end of her life, the widowed Maria Quitéria was nearly blind, and in 1853 she died in relative obscurity and poverty near Salvador. Her remains were placed in the ossuary of the Church of the Blessed Sacrament of Saint Anne (Portuguese: Igreja do Santíssimo Sacramento e Sant'Ana), in the neighborhood of Nazaré in Salvador. It was not until years later that her legacy was revived.

== Legacy ==
After her death, Maria Quitéria was memorialized nationally in a number of ways. In 1953, one hundred years after her death, a bronze medal was issued by the military bearing Maria Quitéria's likeness. It is called the "Medal of Maria Quitéria" and was issued to both civilians and military personnel for valuable contributions to military efforts. By presidential decree in 1996, Maria Quitéria was proclaimed Patron of the Corps of Support Staff Officers of the Brazilian Army.

The best-known painting of Maria Quitéria is a work by Italian painter Domenico Failutti from 1920 titled Portrait of Maria Quitéria de Jesus Medeiros (Portuguese: Retrato de Maria Quitéria de Jesus Medeiros). She is depicted standing alone, holding a rifle and wearing the uniform of a Brazilian lieutenant. The work can be found in the Museu Paulista at the University of São Paulo.

== Gallery ==
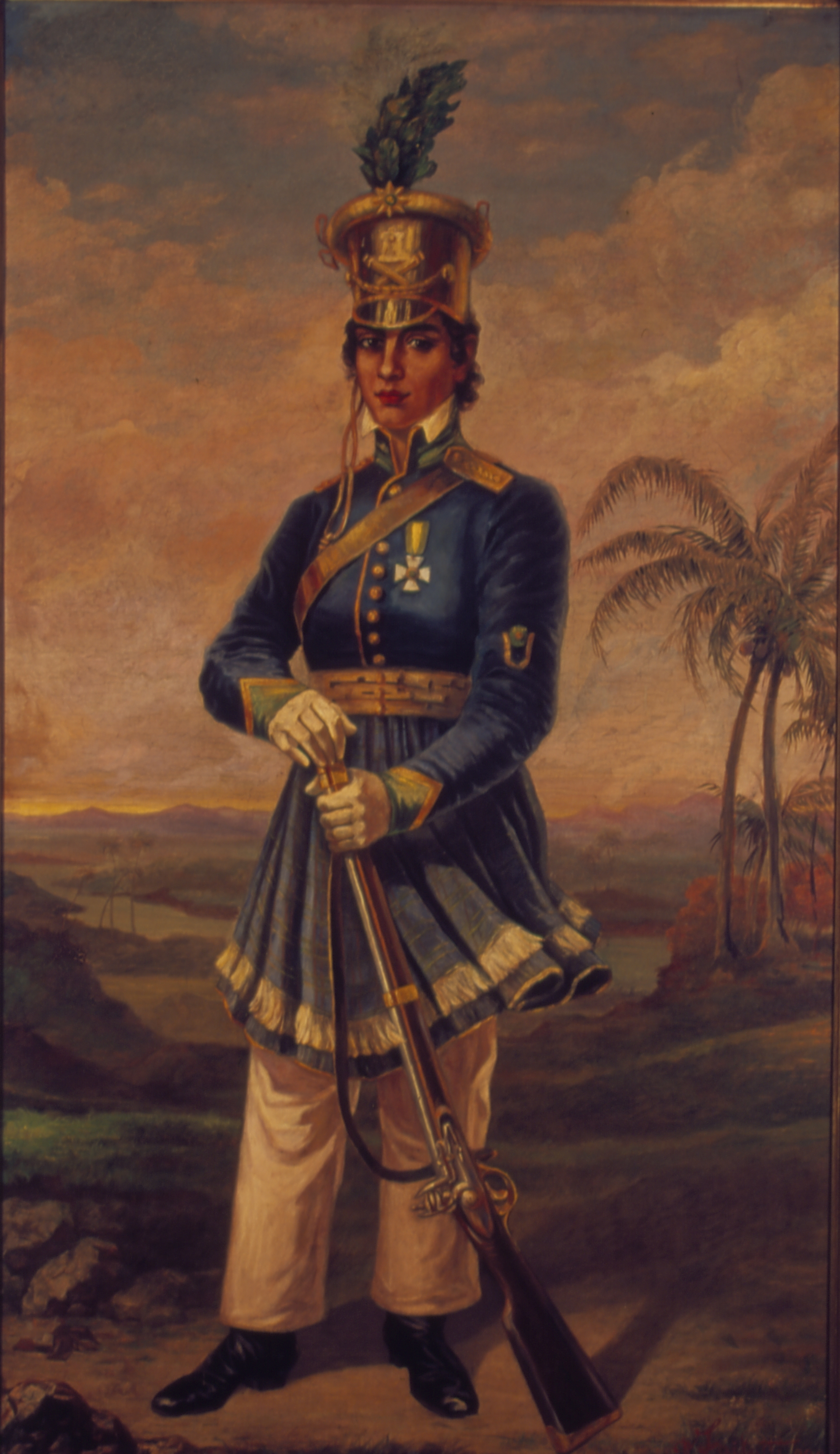
Domenico Failutti, Portrait of Maria Quitéria de Jesus Medeiros, 1920

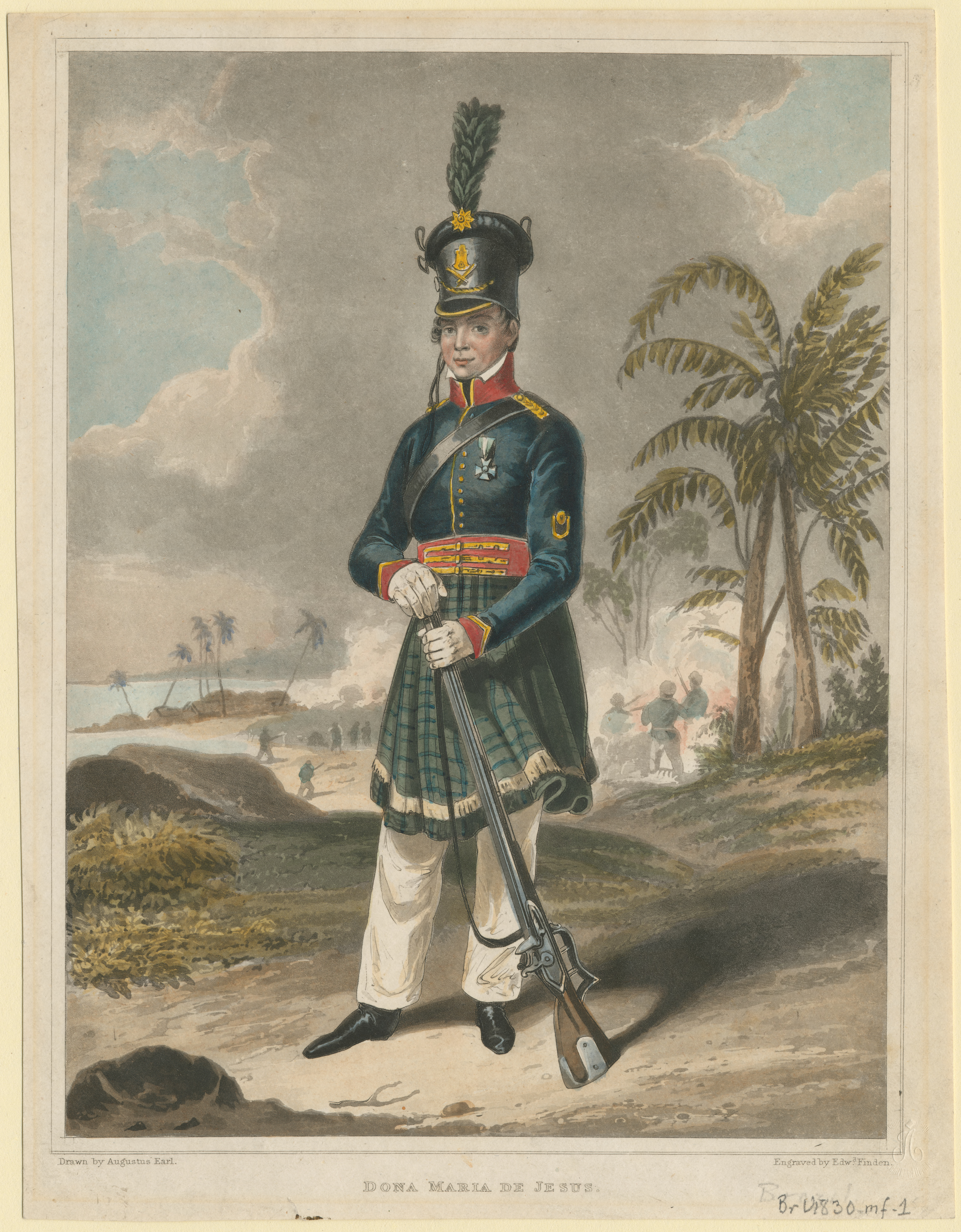
Augustus Earle, Dona Maria de Jesus, 1830

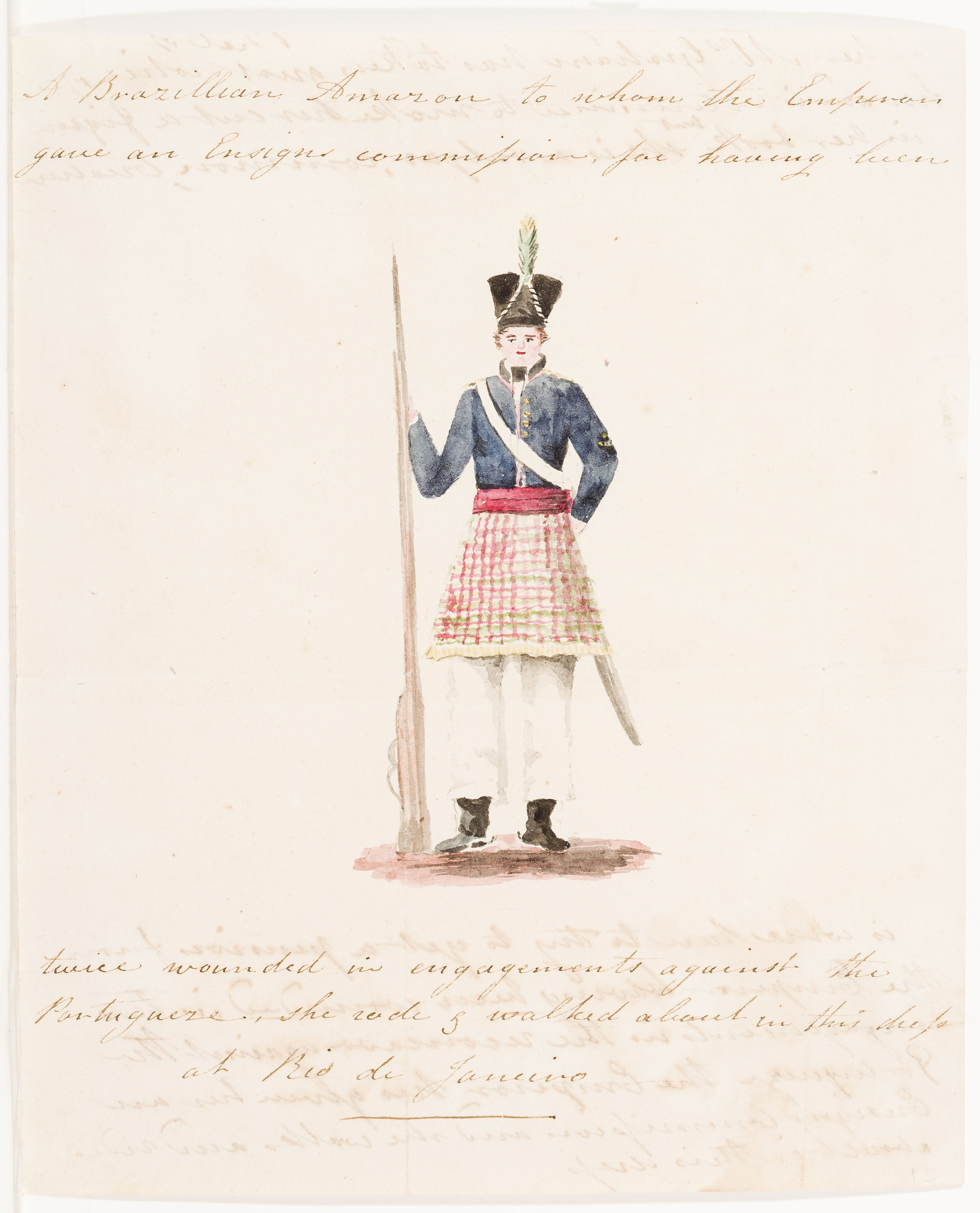
A Brazilian Amazon..., drawing by Sir Henry Chamberlain, 2nd Baronet, 1823

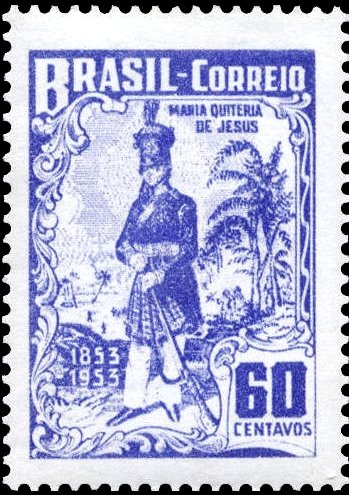
A 1953 Brazilian stamp depicting Quitéria

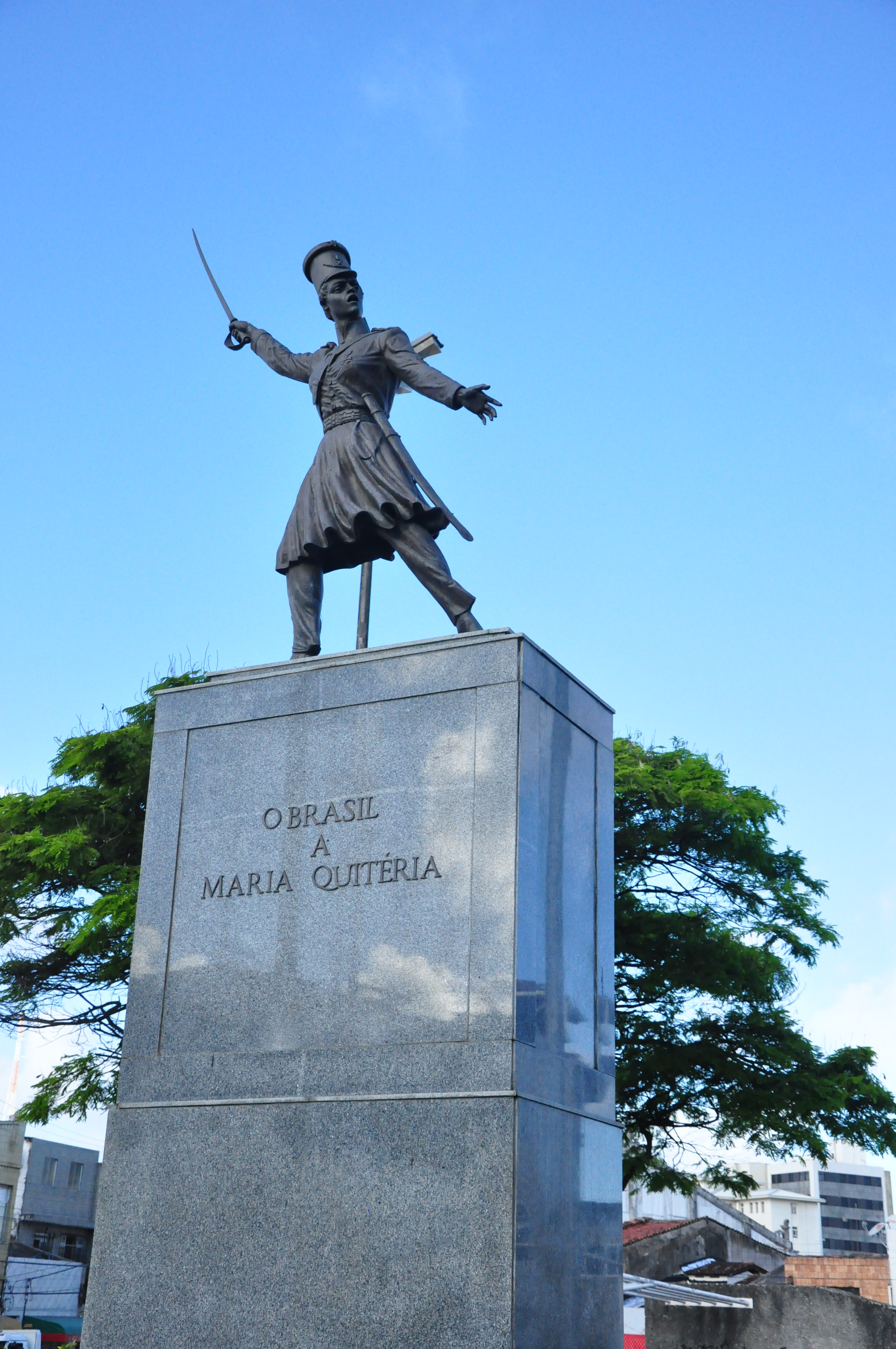
Statue of Maria Quiteria in Salvador, Bahia, Brazil
