= Parakeet Battalion =

Military division of the Empire of Brazil

3rd Infantry Battalion
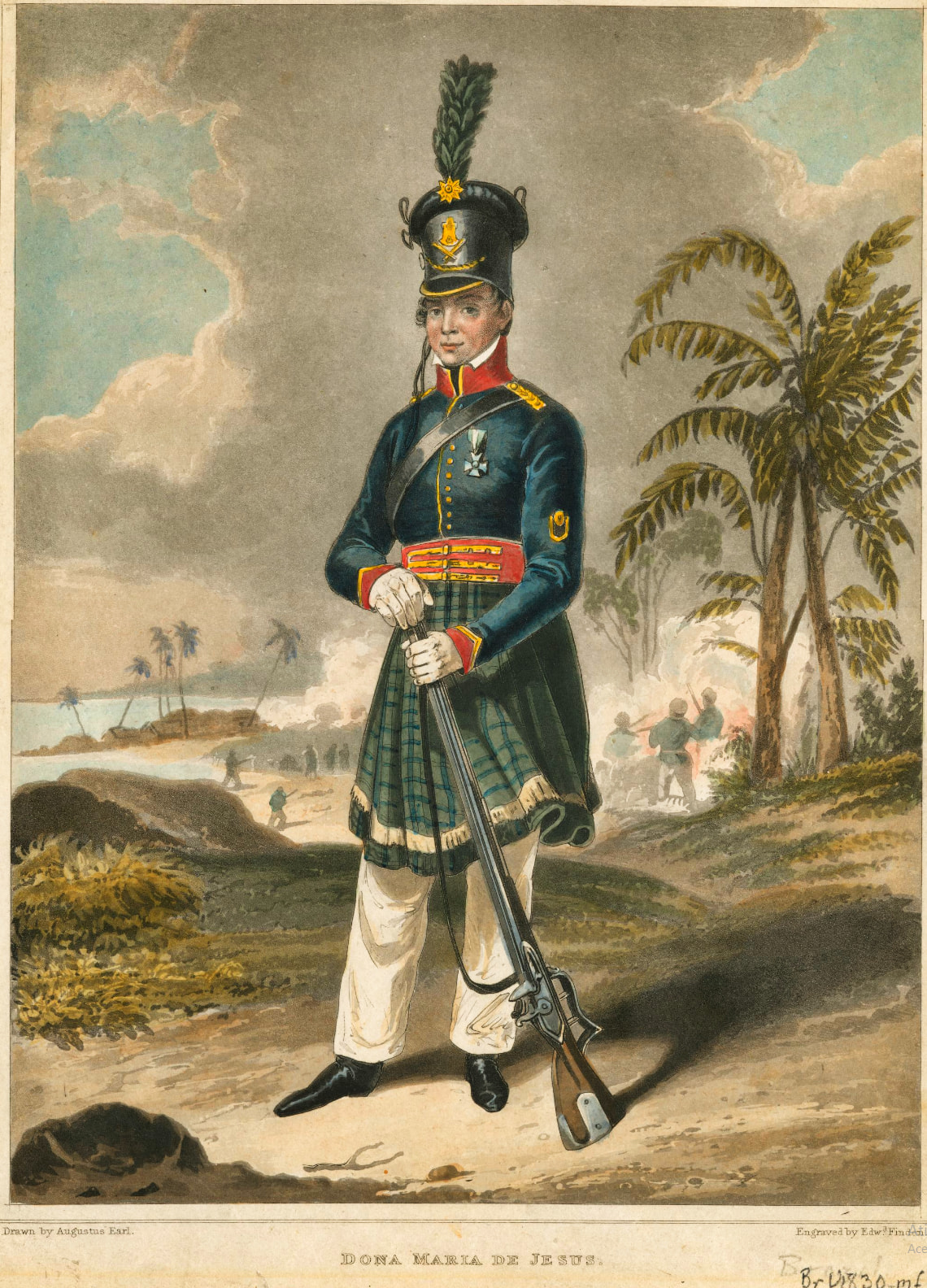
- Maria Quitéria, heroine of the Parakeet Battalion, in an engraving from the book Journal of a Voyage to Brazil, by Maria Graham.
- Active: 1822–1824
- Country: Empire of Brazil
- Branch: Army
- Nickname: Parakeet Battalion
- Engagements: Battle in Pituba

Commanders
- Current commander: Major José Antônio da Silva Castro

The 3rd Infantry Battalion was a military division of the Empire of Brazil commanded by Major José Antônio da Silva Castro. It became known as the Parakeet Battalion (Portuguese: Batalhão dos Periquitos) and its commander as "Periquitão" (lit. 'Big Parakeet'), due to the presence of green in their uniforms. The battalion was formed during the Independence of Bahia, in 1822, and its integration into the Imperial Brazilian Army was formalized in 1823.

== Formation ==
After Portuguese forces defeated some Brazilian army units in the north of the Empire, some sugar mill owners swore loyalty to the Brazilian Emperor Pedro of Braganza, and the French mercenary Pierre Labatut was sent to Salvador to command the forces on behalf of the Empire of Brazil.

At that time, the battalion was called the Prince D. Pedro Volunteer Battalion (Portuguese: Batalhão de Voluntários do Príncipe D. Pedro) and was composed of rural militias, patriots, and slaves from the plantations of Portuguese owners without Brazilian heirs. Many of these slaves were forcibly enlisted by Labatut. Silva Castro, then an ensign at the time, helped organize and train the soldiers of this battalion, which led to his promotion to Major.

In September 1823, after the end of the armed conflicts, the army of which the battalion was a part had its strength reduced from 15,000 to 2,500, and the battalion was formally named the 3rd Infantry Battalion.

== Battles ==
The Parakeet Battalion was assigned to protect Ilha de Maré in All Saints Bay. On November 22, 1822, on their way to Pituba, they were attacked by Portuguese forces. On February 23, 1823, they participated in a battle at Itapoã, and on April 23, they defended the mouth of the Paraguaçu River, where they prevented the landing of Portuguese forces.

The Battalion was responsible for more than a month of conflict, from October 21st to early December. They violently took over the city of Salvador, supported by other black battalions, assassinating the Armed Forces Governor, Colonel Felisberto Gomes Caldeira. The targets of the attacks were the Portuguese, supporters of the monarchy, and even merchants; after all, part of the poor population joined the military group in looting various establishments. It is important to remember that Salvador, after the independence movements, was experiencing a major economic crisis, reflected in poverty and unemployment, and this is why this revolt was more complex than political differences: social issues also weighed heavily.

== Parakeet revolt ==
According to historian Hendrik Kraay, there was a clear distinction between slave and soldier, and thus, this recruitment was seen as an implicit promise of freedom. The Interim Council at the time opposed the recruitment of slaves, stating that "the French general had undertaken the 'horrible' measure of creating a 'Battalion of captive blacks, Creoles and Africans.'" Racial and class tensions continued after the end of the war, when the slaves who had participated in it were freed but remained as soldiers of the Parakeet Battalion in Salvador.

With the announcement of the transfer of the 3rd Infantry Battalion to Pernambuco, and of its commander, Silva Castro, to Rio de Janeiro, in addition to the constant delay in the soldiers' salaries, the Parakeet Revolt began on October 21, 1824. The first action during the revolt was the assassination of the Governor of Arms, Colonel Felisberto Gomes Caldeira.

With the end of the revolt, the battalion was eliminated and a new Governor of Arms was appointed, Brigadier José Egídio.

== See also ==
- Maria Quitéria
- Imperial Brazilian Army
