= USTA Men's Clay Courts of Tampa =

Defunct tennis tournament
- Tour: ATP Tour
- Founded: 1991
- Abolished: 1993
- Location: Tampa, Florida, USA
- Surface: Clay

The USTA Men's Clay Courts of Tampa is a defunct tennis tournament that was played on the Grand Prix tennis circuit from 1991 to 1993. The event was held in Tampa, Florida and was played on outdoor clay courts.

== Singles ==
Year	Champion	Runner-up	Score	Source
1991	(United States) Richey Reneberg	(Czech Republic) Petr Korda	4–6, 6–4, 6–2	
1992	(Peru) Jaime Yzaga	(United States) MaliVai Washington	3–6, 6–4, 6–1	
1993	(Peru) Jaime Yzaga	(Australia) Richard Fromberg	6–4, 6–2	

=== Doubles ===
Year	Champion	Runner-up	Score
1991	(United States) Ken Flach (United States) Robert Seguso	(United States) David Pate (United States) Richey Reneberg	6–7, 6–4, 6–1
1992	(United States) Mike Briggs (United States) Trevor Kronemann	(Brazil) Luiz Mattar (Russia) Andrei Olhovskiy	7–6, 6–7, 6–4
1993	(United States) Todd Martin (United States) Derrick Rostagno	(United States) Kelly Jones (United States) Jared Palmer	6–3, 6–4
