= Forte de São Lourenço =

- Itaparica, Bahia in Brazil
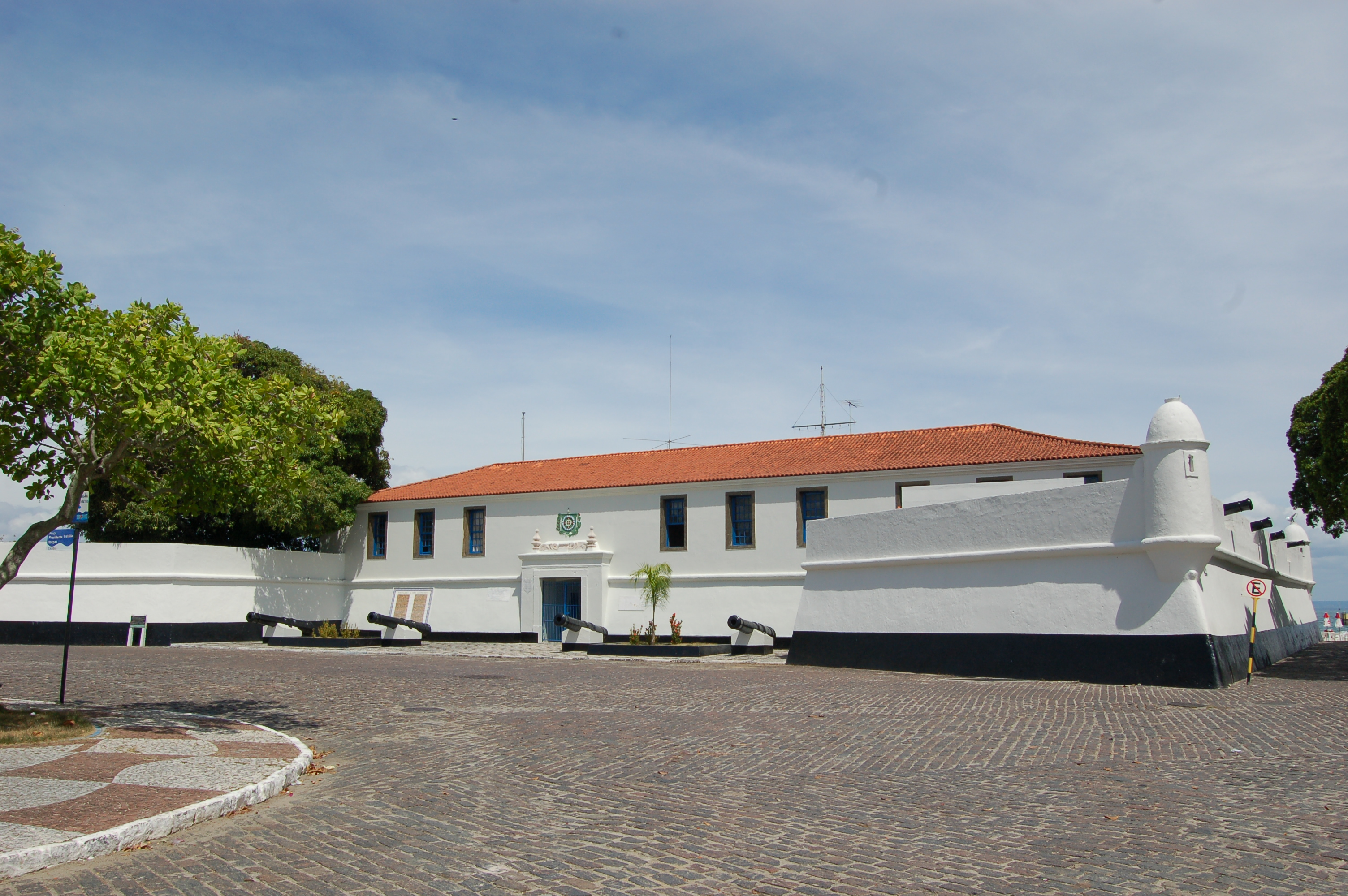
- View of the fort

Site information
- Type: Fort

Location
- Location of Forte de São Lourenço in Brazil
- Coordinates: 12.879488°S 38.685279°W
- Area: 1,190 square metres (12,800 ft^{2})

Site history
- Built: 1711
- Materials: stone masonry and reinforced concrete

National Historic Heritage of Brazil
- Designated: 1938
- Reference no.: 155

Forte de São Lourenço (English language: Fort of Saint Lawrence) is a fort located in Itaparica, Bahia in Brazil. It sits on a strategic point at the north of Itaparica Island on a site used for whaling in the early 17th century. The Dutch constructed a small earthwork fortification on the site during the Dutch occupation of Brazil (1630–1654); it was reconstructed by the Portuguese in its present form in the early 18th century. The fort was used by Brazilian forces during the Brazilian struggle for independence in 1823; the Brazilian Navy has owned the fort since the same year. The Forte de São Lourenço was listed as a federal historic structure in 1938.

== History ==
João Francisco, a Portuguese whale fisherman, established a small whaling port at the north of Itaparica Island in 1624. The point was called Ponta da Baleia (English: Whale Point). The point was occupied by the Dutch during their occupation of Brazil (1630–1654). The Dutch, under Siegsmundt Van Schkoppe, established a small earthwork fortification in 1647 at the Ponta da Baleia. The structure sat on a hill protecting the only natural port on the island. The Dutch named the fortification the Fort of the Eminence. It resisted an attack by Francisco Rebelo in October 1647. The Dutch destroyed the fortification when they retreated to Recife.

Rodrigo da Costa, governor of Bahia, planned a reconstruction of the fort in 1704. Miguel Pereira da Costa, a military officer from Portugal, arrived in Brazil in 1710 and identified the northern point of Itaparica as a strategic location to protect the Bay of All Saints; the point protected both the Bay in general, and small boats from the Recôncavo region in the interior of Bahia that supplied Salvador with much of its trade. Pereira da Costa appealed to Lourenço de Almeida, governor, for funds to complete the fortification. The French invasion of Rio de Janeiro in 1711 spurred the Portuguese to fund the project on the site of the Dutch fortification. Sancho de Faro, governor of Brazil, inspected the fort and its military works in 1719. It was again inspected in 1722 and described in subsequent reports, and again repaired in 1782.

The Forte de São Lourenço played an important role in the Brazilian struggle for independence. Barros Galvão, a Brazilian independence fighter, scaled the walls of the fort, now abandoned by the Portuguese, to search for any remaining weapons and to occupy the fort. Brazilian forces repelled attacks by the Portuguese on January 7, 1823. The fort subsequently became the property of the Brazilian Navy. The fort was in ruin by 1859, as recorded during a visit by Dom Pedro II. Its cannons were useless by this point and the Command House was used as a public jail. The fort was rebuilt between 1862 and 1863 as part of the repair of forts across Brazil. It was transformed into a hospital in 1892.

== Location ==
Forte de São Lourenço faces a broad beach on the north of the Island of Itaparica. Praça Getúlio Vargas sits to the right of the fort, and a small beach with leafy tamarind trees sits to the east of the fort. The fort is part of an architectural ensemble that includes the Church of Saint Lawrence, the Parish Church of the Blessed Sacrament, and Town Hall of Itaparica.

== Structure ==
The fort consists of walls of stone masonry with access via a tunnel and a ramp. It covers 1,190 square metres (12,800 ft^{2}). The fort consists of two "irregular hornwork demi-bastions" of six protruding angles and two reentrant angles. The structure was built to defer both attacks by sea and from infantry attacks by land. The fort had a captain's residence, barracks, and prison. The former barracks and prison are covered by cradle vaults. The internal structures were modified or removed in 1970 by the Brazilian Navy. The fort was remodeled into a degaussing station by the Brazilian Navy between 1974 and 1975; the Command Houses was demolished and a U-shaped structure of reinforced concrete housed a degaussing station.

== Protected status ==
The Forte de São Lourenço was listed as a historic structure by the National Institute of Historic and Artistic Heritage in 1938.

== See also ==
- Military history of Brazil
