= Itaparica, Bahia =

Municipality of Bahia, Brazil

Itaparica
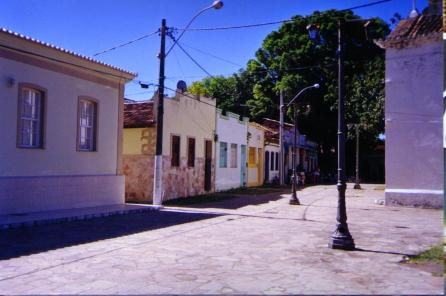
- A street in Itaparica.

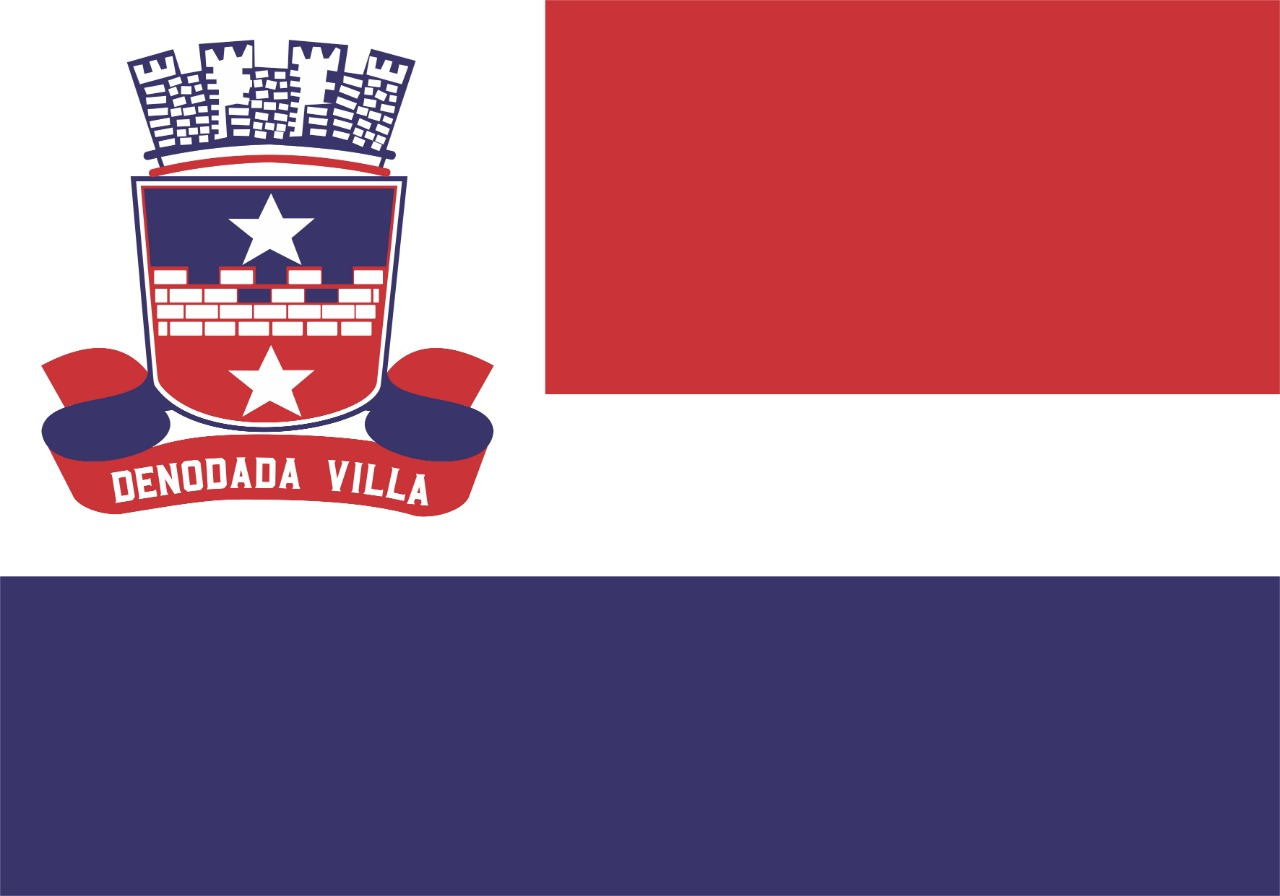
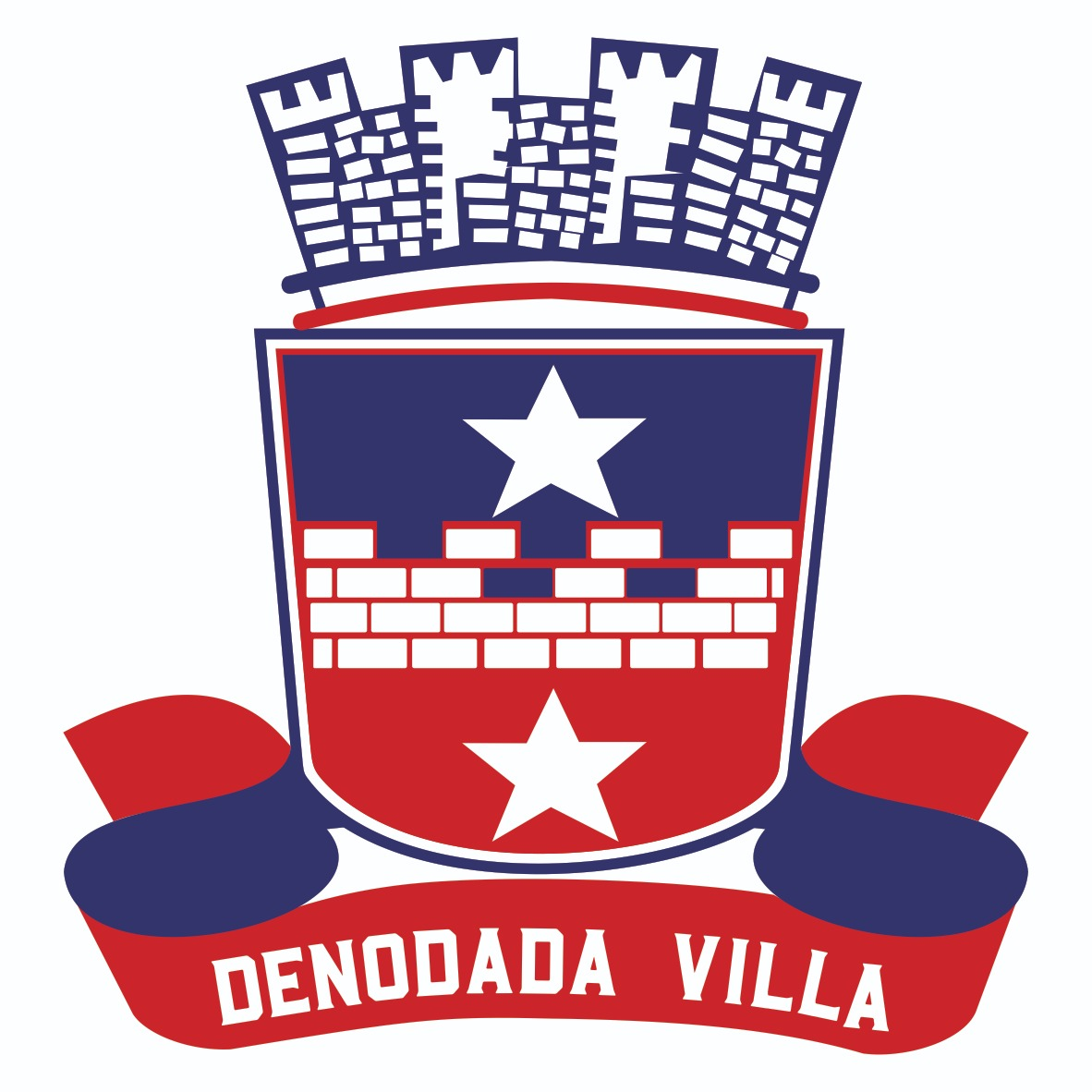
- Flag Coat of arms

- Location in the state of Bahia and Brazil
- Coordinates: 12°53′16″S 38°40′44″W
- Country: Brazil
- Region: Northeast
- State: Bahia

Government
  - Mayor: Marlylda Barbuda dos Santos

Area
  - Total: 115.922 km^{2} (44.758 sq mi)

Population (2020, est.)
  - Total: 22,337
  - Density: 192.69/km^{2} (499.06/sq mi)
- Time zone: UTC−3 (BRT)
- Website: Prefeitura Municipal de Itaparica

Itaparica is a municipality located in the Brazilian island of the same name in the state of Bahia. The municipality covers 13% of the island; the remainder belongs to the municipality of Vera Cruz. The municipality of Itaparica has a population of is 22,337 (2020 estimate) and covers an area of 115.922 square kilometres (44.758 mi^{2}).

== History ==
The initial Portuguese settlement of the Island of Itaparica was at Baiacu, now part of the municipality of Vera Cruz. The island became an important source of sugarcane production in the new colony of Brazil. It was occupied by the Dutch between 1600 and 1647; they constructed the Forte de São Lourenço in this period. The settlement around the fort became a small settlement on the island that now makes up the Historic Center of Itaparica. The historic center includes the Church of Saint Lawrence (Igreja de São Lourenço, 16th century), which was constructed prior to the Dutch occupation; and Parish Church of the Blessed Sacrament (Igreja Matriz do Santíssimo Sacramento, 1794). The churches, along with the historic center and fort, are designated federal historic sites by the National Institute of Historic and Artistic Heritage.

The Island of Itaparica was administered as part of Salvador until 1833. It was elevated to city status in 1962, and subsequently divided into two municipalities: Itaparica and Vera Cruz.

== See also ==
- List of municipalities in Bahia
