= 1989 Citibank Open =

- Date: 20–25 November
- Edition: 4th
- Category: Grand Prix
- Draw: 32S / 16D
- Prize money: $275,000
- Surface: Hard / court
- Location: Itaparica, Brazil

Champions

Singles
- (Argentina) Martín Jaite

Doubles
- (United States) Rick Leach / (United States) Jim Pugh
← 1988 ·	ATP Itaparica	· 1990 →

The 1989 Citibank Open was a men's tennis tournament played on outdoor hard courts in Itaparica, Brazil that was part of the 1989 Nabisco Grand Prix. It was the fourth edition of the tournament and took place from 20 November through 25 November 1989. Third-seeded Martín Jaite won the singles title.

== Finals ==
=== Singles ===
(Argentina) Martín Jaite defeated (United States) Jay Berger 6–4, 6–4

- It was Jaite's 4th singles title of the year and the 9th of his career.

=== Doubles ===
(United States) Rick Leach / (United States) Jim Pugh defeated (Mexico) Jorge Lozano / (United States) Todd Witsken 6–2, 7–6
