= Jaime Yzaga =

Peruvian tennis player

- Country (sports): Peru
- Residence: Lima, Peru
- Born: 23 October 1967 (age 58) Lima, Peru
- Height: 1.70 m (5 ft 7 in)
- Turned pro: 1985
- Retired: 1997
- Plays: Right-handed (one-handed backhand)
- Prize money: $2,234,150

Singles
- Career record: 265–222
- Career titles: 8
- Highest ranking: No. 18 (30 October 1989)

Grand Slam singles results
- Australian Open: QF (1991)
- French Open: 4R (1994)
- Wimbledon: 2R (1991, 1992, 1994)
- US Open: QF (1994)

Other tournaments
- Grand Slam Cup: 1R (1991, 1994)

Doubles
- Career record: 55–55
- Career titles: 0
- Highest ranking: No. 54 (20 November 1989)

Grand Slam doubles results
- French Open: 2R (1980)
- US Open: 1R (1989, 1990)

Grand Slam mixed doubles results
- French Open: 1R (1986)
- Last updated on: 12 June 2022.

Jaime Yzaga Tori (born 23 October 1967) is a Peruvian former professional tennis player. He reached two major singles quarterfinals during his career, at the 1991 Australian Open and the 1994 US Open.

== Tennis career ==
As a junior, Yzaga won the French Open in 1985 and reached the semifinals of Wimbledon (also in 1985) and of the US Open (1984).

Yzaga played on the professional tour from 1984 to 1996, reaching career-high rankings of world No. 18 in singles and world No. 54 in doubles (both in 1989).

He was a quarterfinalist at the Australian Open in 1991, and at the US Open in 1994, reaching the final eight by defeating in back-to-back matches finalists of the previous edition: Cédric Pioline and Pete Sampras in five sets. Yzaga came back from a 2-sets-to-0 deficit against Pioline and 2-sets-to-1 against Sampras. At 5 ft 7 in (1.70 m), he was the shortest Grand Slam tournament quarterfinalist until Diego Schwartzman, also 5'7", at the 2017 U.S. Open.

He had earlier been the first-ever opponent of Sampras in the main draw of a Grand Slam tournament, in the first round of the 1988 US Open, also winning that match in 5 sets.

Since retiring as a player, Yzaga has served as captain of Peru's Davis Cup team.

== ATP career finals ==
=== Singles: 11 (8 titles, 3 runner-ups) ===
Legend Grand Slam Tournaments (0–0) ATP World Tour Finals (0–0) ATP World Tour Masters Series (0–0) ATP Championship Series (1–0) ATP World Series (7–3)	Finals by surface Hard (5–0) Clay (3–2) Grass (0–0) Carpet (0–1)	Finals by setting Outdoors (7–3) Indoors (1–0)

Result	W–L	Date	Tournament	Tier	Surface	Opponent	Score
Win	1–0	Jul 1987	Schenectady, United States	Grand Prix	Hard	(United States) Jim Pugh	0–6, 7–6^{(7–4)}, 6–1
Win	2–0	Nov 1987	São Paulo, Brazil	Grand Prix	Hard	(Brazil) Luiz Mattar	6–2, 4–6, 6–2
Win	3–0	Nov 1988	Itaparica, Brazil	Grand Prix	Hard	(Argentina) Javier Frana	7–6^{(7–4)}, 6–2
Loss	3–1	May 1989	Forest Hills, United States	Grand Prix	Clay	(Czechoslovakia) Ivan Lendl	2–6, 1–6
Loss	3–2	Oct 1990	São Paulo, Brazil	World Series	Carpet	(United States) Robbie Weiss	6–3, 6–7^{(7–9)}, 3–6
Win	4–2	May 1991	Charlotte, United States	World Series	Clay	(United States) Jimmy Arias	6–3, 7–5
Win	5–2	Jan 1992	Auckland, New Zealand	World Series	Hard	(United States) MaliVai Washington	7–6^{(8–6)}, 6–4
Win	6–2	Apr 1992	Tampa, United States	World Series	Clay	(United States) MaliVai Washington	3–6, 6–4, 6–1
Loss	6–3	Apr 1993	Charlotte, United States	World Series	Clay	(Argentina) Horacio de la Peña	6–3, 3–6, 4–6
Win	7–3	May 1993	Tampa, United States	World Series	Clay	(Australia) Richard Fromberg	6–4, 6–2
Win	8–3	Oct 1993	Sydney, Australia	Championship Series	Hard	(Czech Republic) Petr Korda	6–2, 4–6, 7–6^{(7–4)}, 7–6^{(9–7)}

=== Doubles: 3 (3 runner-ups) ===
Legend Grand Slam Tournaments (0–0) ATP World Tour Finals (0–0) ATP World Tour Masters Series (0–0) ATP Championship Series (0–0) ATP World Series (0–3)	Finals by surface Hard (0–0) Clay (0–3) Grass (0–0) Carpet (0–0)	Finals by setting Outdoors (0–3) Indoors (0–0)

Result	W–L	Date	Tournament	Tier	Surface	Partner	Opponents	Score
Loss	0–1	May 1988	Boston, United States	Grand Prix	Clay	(Socialist Federal Republic of Yugoslavia) Bruno Orešar	(Mexico) Jorge Lozano (United States) Todd Witsken	6–3, 5–7, 2–6
Loss	0–2	May 1989	Charleston, United States	Grand Prix	Clay	(Mexico) Agustín Moreno	(Sweden) Mikael Pernfors (Sweden) Tobias Svantesson	4–6, 6–4, 5–7
Loss	0–3	Oct 1989	Bordeaux, France	Grand Prix	Clay	(Mexico) Agustín Moreno	(Spain) Tomás Carbonell (Peru) Carlos di Laura	4–6, 3–6

== ATP Challenger and ITF Futures finals ==
=== Singles: 1 (0–1) ===
Legend ATP Challenger (0–1) ITF Futures (0–0)	Finals by surface Hard (0–1) Clay (0–0) Grass (0–0) Carpet (0–0)

Result	W–L	Date	Tournament	Tier	Surface	Opponent	Score
Loss	0–1	Oct 1992	Ponte Vedra, United States	Challenger	Hard	(Mexico) Luis-Enrique Herrera	5–7, 4–6

=== Doubles: 1 (1–0) ===
Legend ATP Challenger (1–0) ITF Futures (0–0)	Finals by surface Hard (0–0) Clay (1–0) Grass (0–0) Carpet (0–0)

Result	W–L	Date	Tournament	Tier	Surface	Partner	Opponents	Score
Win	1–0	Oct 1995	Lima, Peru	Challenger	Clay	(Peru) Americo Venero-Montes	(Venezuela) Juan Carlos Bianchi (Egypt) Tamer El Sawy	6–3, 6–4

== Junior Grand Slam finals ==
=== Singles: 1 (1 title) ===
Result	Year	Tournament	Surface	Opponent	Score
Win	1985	French Open	Clay	(Austria) Thomas Muster	2–6, 6–3, 6–0

=== Doubles: 2 (1 title, 1 runner-up) ===
Result	Year	Tournament	Surface	Partner	Opponents	Score
Loss	1984	US Open	Hard	(Mexico) Agustín Moreno	(Mexico) Leonardo Lavalle (Romania) Mihnea Nastase	6–7, 6–1, 1–6
Win	1985	Wimbledon	Grass	(Mexico) Agustín Moreno	(Czech Republic) Petr Korda (Czech Republic) Cyril Suk	7–6^{(7–3)}, 6–4

== Performance timelines ==
Key
W	F	SF	QF	#R	RR	Q#	DNQ	A	NH

(W) winner; (F) finalist; (SF) semifinalist; (QF) quarterfinalist; (#R) rounds 4, 3, 2, 1; (RR) round-robin stage; (Q#) qualification round; (DNQ) did not qualify; (A) absent; (NH) not held; (SR) strike rate (events won / competed); (W–L) win–loss record.

=== Singles ===
Tournament	1984	1985	1986	1987	1988	1989	1990	1991	1992	1993	1994	1995	1996	SR	W–L	Win %
Grand Slam tournaments
Australian Open	A	A	NH	A	A	A	A	QF	1R	1R	1R	1R	1R	0 / 6	4–6	40%
French Open	A	A	2R	1R	1R	3R	1R	3R	1R	1R	4R	1R	A	0 / 10	8–10	44%
Wimbledon	A	A	A	1R	1R	A	A	2R	2R	A	2R	A	A	0 / 5	3–5	38%
US Open	A	4R	3R	3R	3R	3R	3R	2R	1R	2R	QF	2R	A	0 / 11	20–11	65%
Win–loss	0–0	3–1	3–2	2–3	2–3	4–2	2–2	8–4	1–4	1–3	8–4	1–3	0–1	0 / 32	35–32	52%
National Representation
Summer Olympics	1R	Not Held			A	Not Held			A	Not Held			A	0 / 1	0–1	0%
ATP Masters Series
Indian Wells	A	A	A	A	1R	1R	1R	A	1R	3R	2R	1R	A	0 / 7	3–7	30%
Miami	A	A	2R	2R	2R	4R	3R	2R	3R	1R	4R	QF	A	0 / 10	15–10	60%
Monte Carlo	A	A	2R	A	A	A	3R	A	1R	A	3R	1R	A	0 / 5	5–5	50%
Hamburg	A	A	A	A	A	A	2R	A	A	A	3R	3R	A	0 / 3	5–3	63%
Rome	A	A	A	2R	QF	3R	2R	1R	QF	1R	1R	2R	A	0 / 9	11–9	55%
Canada	A	A	A	A	A	A	A	1R	A	2R	3R	A	A	0 / 3	3–3	50%
Cincinnati	A	A	A	1R	A	QF	A	2R	QF	1R	1R	1R	A	0 / 7	7–7	50%
Paris	A	A	A	A	A	A	A	A	A	A	1R	A	A	0 / 1	0–1	0%
Win–loss	0–0	0–0	2–2	2–3	4–3	8–4	5–5	2–4	8–5	3–5	9–8	6–6	0–0	0 / 45	49–45	52%

=== Doubles ===
Tournament	1986	1987	1988	1989	1990	1991	1992	1993	1994	1995	SR	W–L	Win %
Grand Slam tournaments
Australian Open	NH	A	A	A	A	A	A	A	A	A	0 / 0	0–0	–
French Open	A	1R	A	2R	A	A	A	A	A	A	0 / 2	1–2	33%
Wimbledon	A	A	A	A	A	A	A	A	A	A	0 / 0	0–0	–
US Open	A	A	A	1R	1R	A	A	A	A	A	0 / 2	0–2	0%
Win–loss	0–0	0–1	0–0	1–2	0–1	0–0	0–0	0–0	0–0	0–0	0 / 4	1–4	20%
ATP Masters Series
Miami	1R	A	A	1R	A	A	A	A	A	A	0 / 2	0–2	0%
Monte Carlo	A	A	A	A	2R	A	A	A	A	A	0 / 1	1–1	50%
Hamburg	A	A	A	A	A	A	A	A	A	Q1	0 / 0	0–0	–
Rome	A	A	A	2R	2R	A	A	A	A	Q1	0 / 2	2–2	50%
Canada	A	A	A	A	A	A	A	Q1	Q1	A	0 / 0	0–0	–
Cincinnati	A	A	A	1R	A	A	A	A	A	Q1	0 / 1	0–1	0%
Win–loss	0–1	0–0	0–0	1–3	2–2	0–0	0–0	0–0	0–0	0–0	0 / 6	3–6	33%
