= Jorge Lozano =

Mexican tennis player (born 1963)

- Country (sports): Mexico
- Residence: Guadalajara, Mexico
- Born: 17 May 1963 (age 63) San Luis Potosí, Mexico
- Height: 1.80 m (5 ft 11 in)
- Turned pro: 1986
- Retired: 1994
- Plays: Right-handed
- Prize money: $739,424

Singles
- Career record: 26–49
- Career titles: 0
- Highest ranking: No. 51 (12 September 1988)

Grand Slam singles results
- French Open: 2R (1988)
- Wimbledon: 1R (1989)
- US Open: 4R (1988)

Doubles
- Career record: 208–164
- Career titles: 9
- Highest ranking: No. 4 (22 August 1988)

Mixed doubles
- Career titles: 1

Grand Slam mixed doubles results
- French Open: W (1988, 1990)

Team competitions
- Davis Cup: QF (1986, 1987)

Jorge Lozano (born 17 May 1963) is a retired professional tennis player from Mexico. He reached his highest doubles ranking of World No. 4 in August 1988. His highest singles ranking was World No. 51, achieved the following month.

During his career, he won two mixed doubles titles at the French Open: in 1988 with Lori McNeil and in 1990 with Arantxa Sánchez. He reached the round of 16 in singles at the 1988 US Open and also the semifinal in doubles that same year. Qualified twice for the Doubles Masters at the Royal Albert Hall in London and reached the semifinals in 1988. In his career, he won nine doubles titles, but no singles titles.

He turned professional in 1986, and in his career He was the first player to be beaten by Pete Sampras in the main draw of a Grand Slam tournament, at the French Open in 1989. In Davis Cup play, represented Mexico for 15 years, 1981–1995, won 12 doubles matches, and lost 12 as well. He lost 11 singles matches, and won 8, making his overall win / loss record at the Davis Cup 20–23. Lozano won his first title at Forest Hills in 1988, with his partner Todd Witsken, and won his last at Athens in 1993. He resides in Guadalajara. He was the captain of the Mexican Davis Cup Team from 2007 to 2014. He is now the Athletic Director for the University Tec de Monterrey, campus Guadalajara.

== Grand Slam finals ==
=== Mixed doubles: (2 wins) ===
Result	Year	Championship	Surface	Partner	Opponents	Score
Win	1988	French Open	Clay	(United States) Lori McNeil	(Netherlands) Brenda Schultz (Netherlands) Michiel Schapers	7–5, 6–2
Win	1990	French Open	Clay	(Spain) Arantxa Sánchez Vicario	(Australia) Nicole Provis (South Africa) Danie Visser	7–6, 7–6

== Career finals ==
=== Doubles: 22 (9 wins / 13 losses) ===
Result	W/L	Date	Tournament	Surface	Partner	Opponents	Score
Loss	0–1	Nov 1987	Itaparica, Brazil	Hard	(Uruguay) Diego Pérez	(Spain) Sergio Casal (Spain) Emilio Sánchez	2–6, 2–6
Loss	0–2	Mar 1988	Indian Wells, US	Hard	(United States) Todd Witsken	(Germany) Boris Becker (France) Guy Forget	4–6, 4–6
Loss	0–3	May 1988	Charleston, US	Clay	(United States) Todd Witsken	(South Africa) Pieter Aldrich (South Africa) Danie Visser	6–7, 3–6
Win	1–3	May 1988	Forest Hills, US	Clay	(United States) Todd Witsken	(South Africa) Pieter Aldrich (South Africa) Danie Visser	6–3, 7–6
Win	2–3	May 1988	Rome, Italy	Clay	(United States) Todd Witsken	(Sweden) Anders Järryd (Czechoslovakia) Tomáš Šmíd	6–3, 6–3
Win	3–3	Jul 1988	Boston, US	Clay	(United States) Todd Witsken	(Socialist Federal Republic of Yugoslavia) Bruno Orešar (Peru) Jaime Yzaga	6–2, 7–5
Loss	3–4	Jul 1988	Washington, US	Hard	(United States) Todd Witsken	(United States) Rick Leach (United States) Jim Pugh	3–6, 7–6, 2–6
Win	4–4	Jul 1988	Stratton Mountain, US	Hard	(United States) Todd Witsken	(South Africa) Pieter Aldrich (South Africa) Danie Visser	6–3, 7–6
Loss	4–5	Nov 1988	Itaparica, Brazil	Hard	(United States) Todd Witsken	(Spain) Sergio Casal (Spain) Emilio Sánchez	6–7, 6–7
Win	5–5	Apr 1989	Rio de Janeiro, Brazil	Carpet	(United States) Todd Witsken	(United States) Patrick McEnroe (United States) Tim Wilkison	2–6, 6–4, 6–4
Win	6–5	Nov 1989	Stockholm, Sweden	Carpet	(United States) Todd Witsken	(United States) Rick Leach (United States) Jim Pugh	6–3, 5–7, 6–3
Loss	6–6	Nov 1989	Itaparica, Brazil	Hard	(United States) Todd Witsken	(United States) Rick Leach (United States) Jim Pugh	2–6, 6–7
Loss	6–7	Jul 1990	Washington, US	Hard	(United States) Todd Witsken	(Canada) Grant Connell (Canada) Glenn Michibata	3–6, 7–6, 2–6
Loss	6–8	Oct 1990	Vienna, Austria	Carpet (i)	(United States) Todd Witsken	(Germany) Udo Riglewski (Germany) Michael Stich	4–6, 4–6
Win	7–8	Feb 1990	Rotterdam, Netherlands	Carpet	(Mexico) Leonardo Lavalle	(Italy) Diego Nargiso (Venezuela) Nicolás Pereira	6–3, 7–6
Loss	7–9	Nov 1991	São Paulo, Brazil	Hard	(Brazil) Cássio Motta	(Ecuador) Andrés Gómez (Brazil) Jaime Oncins	5–7, 4–6
Win	8.	Mar 1992	Casablanca, Morocco	Clay	(Argentina) Horacio de la Peña	(Latvia) Ģirts Dzelde (United States) T. J. Middleton	2–6, 6–4, 7–6
Loss	10.	Feb 1993	Mexico City, Mexico	Clay	(Argentina) Horacio de la Peña	(Mexico) Leonardo Lavalle (Brazil) Jaime Oncins	6–7, 4–6
Loss	11.	Aug 1993	Prague, Czech Republic	Clay	(Brazil) Jaime Oncins	(Netherlands) Hendrik Jan Davids (Czechoslovakia) Libor Pimek	3–6, 6–7
Loss	12.	Sep 1993	Palermo, Italy	Clay	(Argentina) Juan Garat	(Spain) Sergio Casal (Spain) Emilio Sánchez	3–6, 3–6
Win	9.	Oct 1993	Athens, Greece	Clay	(Argentina) Horacio de la Peña	(South Africa) Royce Deppe (United States) John Sullivan	3–6, 6–1, 6–2
Loss	13.	Jan 1994	Jakarta, Indonesia	Hard	(United States) Jim Pugh	(Sweden) Jonas Björkman (Australia) Neil Borwick	4–6, 1–6
