= ATP Itaparica =

Sul America Open Citibank Open

Defunct tennis tournament
- Event name: Sul America Open (1986–1987); Citibank Open (1988–1990)
- Tour: Grand Prix circuit (1986–89); ATP Tour (1990)
- Founded: 1981
- Abolished: 1990
- Editions: 7
- Location: Itaparica, Brazil
- Venue: Club Med Itaparica
- Surface: Hard

The ATP Itaparica Open is a defunct men's tennis tournament that was part of the Grand Prix tennis circuit from 1981 to 1989 and the ATP Tour in 1990. The event was held in Itaparica, Brazil and was played on outdoor hard courts at Club Med Itaparica.

One Brazilian reached the final, Luiz Mattar in 1987, when he was beaten by Andre Agassi. It was Agassi's first win on the main ATP Tour. In 1990, Mats Wilander won his final career singles tournament here.

In 1991 the tournament was replaced by the ATP São Paulo.

== Results ==
=== Singles ===
Year	Tournament name	Champions	Runners-up	Score
1981	ATP Itaparica Challenger	(United States) Pat DuPré	(Brazil) João Soares	7–5, 6–7, 6–4
1984	ATP Bahia Challenger	(Argentina) Horacio de la Peña	(Brazil) Marcos Hocevar	7–5, 5–7, 7–5
1986	Sul America Open	(Ecuador) Andrés Gómez	(France) Jean-Philippe Fleurian	4–6, 6–4, 6–4
1987	Sul America Open	(United States) Andre Agassi	(Brazil) Luiz Mattar	7–6, 6–2
1988	Citibank Open	(Peru) Jaime Yzaga	(Argentina) Javier Frana	7–6, 6–2
1989	Citibank Open	(Argentina) Martín Jaite	(United States) Jay Berger	6–4, 6–4
1990	Citibank Open	(Sweden) Mats Wilander	(Uruguay) Marcelo Filippini	6–1, 6–2
1991	replaced by ATP São Paulo			

=== Doubles ===
Year	Champions	Runners-up	Score
1986	(United States) Chip Hooper (United States) Mike Leach	(France) Loïc Courteau (France) Guy Forget	7–5, 6–3
1987	(Spain) Sergio Casal (Spain) Emilio Sánchez	(Mexico) Jorge Lozano (Uruguay) Diego Pérez	6–2, 6–2
1988	(Spain) Sergio Casal (Spain) Emilio Sánchez	(Mexico) Jorge Lozano (United States) Todd Witsken	7–6, 7–6
1989	(United States) Rick Leach (United States) Jim Pugh	(Mexico) Jorge Lozano (United States) Todd Witsken	6–2, 7–6
1990	(Brazil) Mauro Menezes (Brazil) Fernando Roese	(Spain) Tomás Carbonell (Spain) Marcos-Aurelio Gorriz-Bonhora	7–6, 7–5
