= Itaparica Island =

Island in Atlantic Ocean

Itaparica
Native name: Itápirika
- Map of Itaparica Island, located about 10 kilometres (6.2 mi) from the city of Salvador (the map is not to scale)

- Location within Brazil

Geography
- Location: Baía de Todos os Santos, Atlantic Ocean
- Coordinates: 12°59′00″S 38°40′00″W
- Total islands: One
- Area: 146 km^{2} (56 sq mi)

Administration
- Brazil
- State: Bahia

Demographics
- Population: 55,000

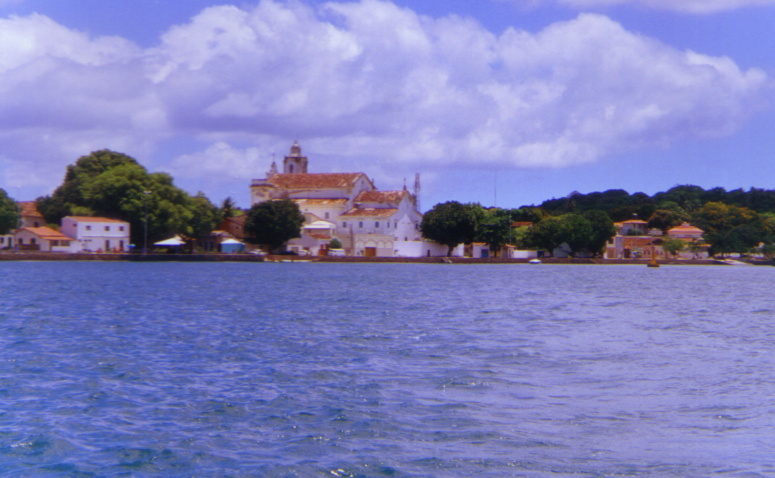

Itaparica is an island located at the entrance of Todos os Santos Bay on the coast of the Atlantic Ocean in the state of Bahia, Brazil. It is located about 10 kilometres (6.2 mi) from the city of Salvador, Bahia and covers 146 square kilometres (56 mi^{2}). There are two municipalities on the island: Vera Cruz (87% of the land area) and Itaparica (13%). Itaparica has 40 kilometres (25 mi) of beaches and exuberant tropical vegetation.

== History ==
Itaparica was home to a large Tupinambá population. Amerigo Vespucci arrived at the island on November 1, 1501. The initial Portuguese settlement was a Jesuit outpost called Baiacu, founded in 1560, later renamed Villa do Senhor da Vera Cruz. Sugarcane and wheat were initially cultivated on the island; cattle were later introduced. The first work of hydraulic engineering in the new colony was on Itaparica: a dam to supply drinking water to the village. The island became productive within a short period of time and was attacked by British Corsairs as early as 1597. It was occupied by the Dutch between 1600 and 1647 during the Dutch Occupation of Brazil. The Dutch constructed the Forte de São Lourenço in this period. The island later became a rich source of income for the Portuguese; it hosted a naval shipyard; lime mills, a crucial building material of the period; and a whaling industry, which continued to the mid-19th century.

The first steam engine in Brazil was set up on the island on the Ingá-Açu plantation. Itaparica was the scene of an important battle during the struggles of Independence of Bahia between 1821 and 1823. Many sobrados, colonial-period houses, were constructed on the island to house Pedro I of Brazil and later Pedro II of Brazil.

== Sul America Open ==
Itaparica is known for hosting the Sul America Open tennis competition (1986-1990). It is the former home of the tennis tournament, the ATP Itaparica.

== Access ==
Itaparica can be reached in about one hour by ferry from Salvador. The smaller passenger-ferry departs from near the Mercado Modelo, while the larger car-ferry goes from about 2 kilometres (1.2 mi) north to Bom Despacho. The state of Bahia is considering constructing a (11.6 kilometres (7.2 mi) bridge between Salvador and Itaparica.

== Noted residents ==
One of its most famous citizens was Brazilian writer João Ubaldo Ribeiro.
