= Monica Seles career statistics =

Career finals
Discipline	Type	Won	Lost	Total	WR
Singles	Grand Slam	9	4	13	0.69
Singles	Year-end	3	1	4	0.75
Singles	Tier I / Category 4-6	10	11	21	0.48
Singles	Tier II / Category 3	21	13	34	0.62
Singles	Tier III-V / Category 1-2	10	3	13	0.77
Singles	Uncategorized				
Singles	Olympics	–	–	–	–
Singles	Total	53	32	85	0.62
Doubles	Grand Slam				
Doubles	Year-end				
Doubles	Tier I / Category 4-6	3	1	4	0.75
Doubles	Tier II / Category 3	3	2	5	0.60
Doubles	Tier III-V / Category 1-2				
Doubles	Uncategorized				
Doubles	Olympics				
Doubles	Total	6	3	9	0.67

This is a list of the main career statistics of former tennis player Monica Seles.

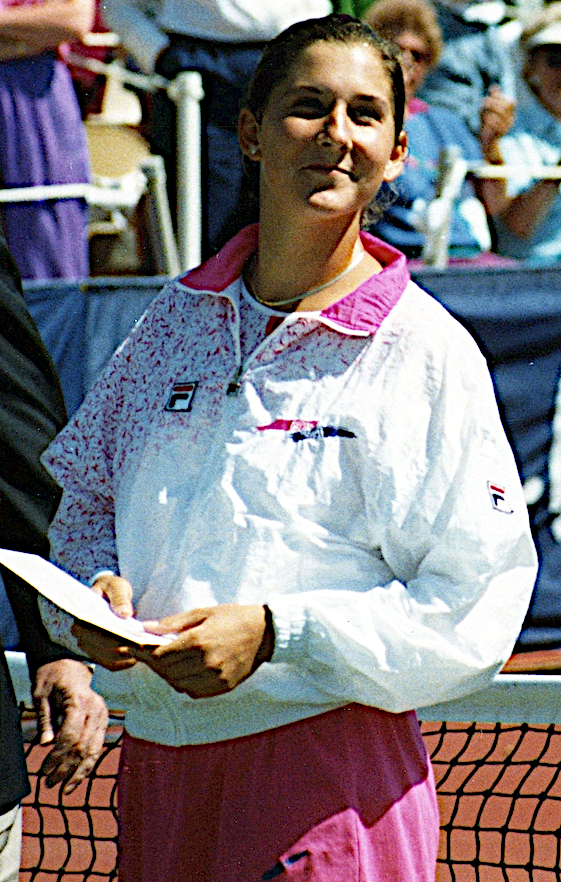
Seles in Montreal in 1992

== Performance timelines ==
Key
W	F	SF	QF	#R	RR	Q#	P#	DNQ	A	Z#	PO	G	S	B	NMS	NTI	P	NH

(W) winner; (F) finalist; (SF) semifinalist; (QF) quarterfinalist; (#R) rounds 4, 3, 2, 1; (RR) round-robin stage; (Q#) qualification round; (P#) preliminary round; (DNQ) did not qualify; (A) absent; (Z#) Davis/Fed Cup Zonal Group (with number indication) or (PO) play-off; (G) gold, (S) silver or (B) bronze Olympic/Paralympic medal; (NMS) not a Masters tournament; (NTI) not a Tier I tournament; (P) postponed; (NH) not held; (SR) strike rate (events won / competed); (W–L) win–loss record.

=== Singles ===
	Yugoslavia				Serbia and Montenegro			United States											
Tournament	1988	1989	1990	1991	1992	1993	1994	1995	1996	1997	1998	1999	2000	2001	2002	2003	SR	W–L	Win %
Grand Slam tournaments
Australian Open	A	A	A	W	W	W	A	A	W	A	A	SF	A	QF	SF	2R	4 / 8	43–4	91%
French Open	A	SF	W	W	W	A	A	A	QF	SF	F	SF	QF	A	QF	1R	3 / 11	54–8	87%
Wimbledon	A	4R	QF	A	F	A	A	A	2R	3R	QF	3R	QF	A	QF	A	0 / 9	30–9	77%
US Open	A	4R	3R	W	W	A	A	F	F	QF	QF	QF	QF	4R	QF	A	2 / 12	53–10	84%
Win–loss	0–0	11–3	13–2	21–0	27–1	7–0	0–0	6–1	18–3	11–3	14–3	16–4	12–3	7–2	17–4	1–2	9 / 40	180–31	85%
Year-end championships
WTA Finals	A	QF	W	W	W	A	A	A	4R	4R	QF	A	F	A	QF	A	3 / 9	18–6	75%
National representation
Summer Olympics	A	NH			A	NH			QF	NH			SF-B (Note: Lost in the semifinals but then won the bronze medal match.)	NH			0 / 2	9–2	82%
Tier I / Category 4-6 tournaments
Indian Wells Open	NH/NMS								A	A	A	3R	QF	2R	SF	A	0 / 4	8–4	67%
Miami Open	2R	A	W	W	QF	A	A	A	A	F	3R	4R	SF	A	SF	A	2 / 9	32–7	82%
Italian Open	NMS	A	W	F	F	A	A	A	A	3R	3R	A	W	A	A	2R	2 / 7	21–5	81%
Canadian Open	A	A	A	A	F	A	A	W	W	W	W	F	A	SF	A	A	4 / 7	31–3	91%
Pan Pacific Open^{†}	A	A	NMS			A	A	A	QF	A	A	SF	A	A	F	F	0 / 4	9–4	69%
Ameritech Cup^{†}	A	A	1R	NH/NMS													0 / 1	0–1	0%
Charleston Open^{†}	A	A	A	A	A	A	A	A	A	F	SF	3R	SF	A	3R	A	0 / 5	12–5	71%
Berlin Open^{†}	A	A	W	A	A	A	A	A	A	A	A	A	A	A	A	A	1 / 1	5–0	100%
Kremlin Cup^{†}	not held								NMS	A	F	A	A	A	A	A	0 / 1	3–1	75%
Zurich Open^{†}	NMS	SF	NMS			A	A	A	A	A	A	A	A	A	A	A	0 / 1	3–1	75%
Virginia Slims of Florida^{†}	2R	A	NMS			NH/NMS											0 / 1	1–1	50%
Virginia Slims of New Orleans^{†}	SF	NH															0 / 1	3–1	75%
Virginia Slims of Washington^{†}	A	SF (Note: Withdrew during the tournament. Not counted as a loss.)	NH/NMS														0 / 1	3–0	100%
Virginia Slims of Houston^{†}	A	W	NH/NMS														1 / 1	5–0	100%
Virginia Slims of Dallas^{†}	A	F	NH														0 / 1	4–1	80%
Stuttgart Open^{†}	A	QF	NMS														0 / 1	2–1	67%
Brighton International^{†}	A	F	NH/NMS														0 / 1	4–1	80%
Win–loss	5–3	21–4	16–1	10–1	11–3	0–0	0–0	5–0	6–1	15–3	13–4	10–5	15–3	3–2	12–4	4–2	10 / 47	146–36	80%
Career Statistics
	1988	1989	1990	1991	1992	1993	1994	1995	1996	1997	1998	1999	2000	2001	2002	2003	SR	W–L	Win%
Tournaments	3	10	15	16	15	4	0	2	14	17	15	13	16	14	15	7	Career total: 176		
Titles	0	1	9	10	10	2	0	1	5	3	2	1	3	4	2	0	Career total: 53		
Finals	0	3	9	16	14	3	0	2	7	7	4	3	6	6	3	2	Career total: 85		
Overall win–loss	5–3	33–8	54–6	74–6	70–5	17–2	0–0	11–1	48–8	45–13	46–13	38–13	58–13	40-10	49–14	10–7	53 / 176	598–122	83%
Year-end ranking	86	6	2	1	1	8	–	1	2	5	6	6	4	10	7	60	$14,891,762		

Notes

- 1 Due to being attacked in April 1993, Seles was absent from the tour for over two years until August 1995. At the time of the attack she was ranked No.1 in the world. On her return, the WTA decided that for her first six tournaments, she would be co-ranked world No.1 alongside Steffi Graf.

== Significant finals ==
=== Grand Slams ===
==== Singles: 13 (9 titles, 4 runner-ups) ====
Result	Year	Championship	Surface	Opponent	Score
Win	1990	French Open	Clay	(Germany) Steffi Graf	7–6^{(8–6)}, 6–4
Win	1991	Australian Open	Hard	(Czechoslovakia) Jana Novotná	5–7, 6–3, 6–1
Win	1991	French Open (2)	Clay	(Spain) Arantxa Sánchez Vicario	6–3, 6–4
Win	1991	US Open	Hard	(United States) Martina Navratilova	7–6^{(7–1)}, 6–1
Win	1992	Australian Open (2)	Hard	(United States) Mary Joe Fernández	6–2, 6–3
Win	1992	French Open (3)	Clay	(Germany) Steffi Graf	6–2, 3–6, 10–8
Loss	1992	Wimbledon	Grass	(Germany) Steffi Graf	2–6, 1–6
Win	1992	US Open (2)	Hard	(Spain) Arantxa Sánchez Vicario	6–3, 6–3
Win	1993	Australian Open (3)	Hard	(Germany) Steffi Graf	4–6, 6–3, 6–2
Loss	1995	US Open	Hard	(Germany) Steffi Graf	6–7^{(6–8)}, 6–0, 3–6
Win	1996	Australian Open (4)	Hard	(Germany) Anke Huber	6–4, 6–1
Loss	1996	US Open	Hard	(Germany) Steffi Graf	5–7, 4–6
Loss	1998	French Open	Clay	(Spain) Arantxa Sánchez Vicario	6–7^{(5–7)}, 6–0, 2–6

=== WTA Finals ===
==== Singles: 4 (3 titles, 1 runner-up) ====
Result	Year	Tournament	Surface	Opponent	Score
Win	1990	Virginia Slims Championships, United States	Carpet (i)	(Argentina) Gabriela Sabatini	6–4, 5–7, 3–6, 6–4, 6–2
Win	1991	Virginia Slims Championships, United States	Carpet (i)	(United States) Martina Navratilova	6–4, 3–6, 7–5, 6–0
Win	1992	Virginia Slims Championships, United States	Carpet (i)	(United States) Martina Navratilova	7–5, 6–3, 6–1
Loss	2000	WTA Tour Championships, United States	Carpet (i)	(Switzerland) Martina Hingis	7–6^{(7–5)}, 4–6, 4–6

=== Olympics ===
Result	Year	Tournament	Surface	Opponent	Score
Bronze	2000	Sydney Olympics	Hard	(Australia) Jelena Dokić	6–1, 6–4

=== WTA 1000 ===
==== Singles: 21 (10 titles, 11 runner-ups) ====
Result	Year	Tournament	Surface	Opponent	Score
Win	1989	Virginia Slims of Houston	Clay	(United States) Chris Evert	3–6, 6–1, 6–4
Loss	1989	Virginia Slims of Dallas	Carpet (i)	(United States) Martina Navratilova	6–7^{(2–7)}, 3–6
Loss	1989	Brighton International	Carpet (i)	(Germany) Steffi Graf	5–7, 4–6
Win	1990	Miami Open	Hard	(Austria) Judith Wiesner	6–1, 6–2
Win	1990	Italian Open	Clay	(United States) Martina Navratilova	6–1, 6–1
Win	1990	German Open	Clay	(Germany) Steffi Graf	6–4, 6–3
Win	1991	Miami Open (2)	Hard	(Argentina) Gabriela Sabatini	6–3, 7–5
Loss	1991	Italian Open	Clay	(Argentina) Gabriela Sabatini	3–6, 2–6
Loss	1992	Italian Open	Clay	(Argentina) Gabriela Sabatini	5–7, 4–6
Loss	1992	Canadian Open	Hard	(Spain) Arantxa Sánchez Vicario	3–6, 6–4, 4–6
Win	1995	Canadian Open	Hard	(South Africa) Amanda Coetzer	6–0, 6–1
Win	1996	Canadian Open (2)	Hard	(Spain) Arantxa Sánchez Vicario	6–1, 7–6^{(7–2)}
Loss	1997	Miami Open	Clay	(Switzerland) Martina Hingis	2–6, 1–6
Loss	1997	Charleston Open	Clay	(Switzerland) Martina Hingis	6–3, 3–6, 6–7^{(5–7)}
Win	1997	Canadian Open (3)	Hard	(Germany) Anke Huber	6–2, 6–4
Win	1998	Canadian Open (4)	Hard	(Spain) Arantxa Sánchez Vicario	6–3, 6–2
Loss	1998	Kremlin Cup	Carpet (i)	(France) Mary Pierce	6–7^{(2–7)}, 3–6
Loss	1999	Canadian Open	Clay	(Switzerland) Martina Hingis	4–6, 4–6
Win	2000	Italian Open (2)	Hard	(France) Amélie Mauresmo	6–2, 7–6^{(7–4)}
Loss	2002	Pan Pacific Open	Carpet (i)	(Switzerland) Martina Hingis	6–7^{(6–8)}, 6–4, 3–6
Loss	2003	Pan Pacific Open	Carpet (i)	(United States) Lindsay Davenport	7–6^{(8–6)}, 1–6, 2–6

==== Doubles: 4 (3 titles, 1 runner-up) ====
Result	Year	Tournament	Surface	Partner	Opponents	Score
Win	1990	Italian Open	Clay	(Canada) Helen Kelesi	(Italy) Laura Garrone (Italy) Laura Golarsa	6–3, 6–4
Win	1991	Italian Open (2)	Clay	(United States) Jennifer Capriati	(Australia) Nicole Bradtke (South Africa) Elna Reinach	7–5, 6–2
Win	1992	Italian Open (3)	Clay	(Czechoslovakia) Helena Suková	(Bulgaria) Katerina Maleeva (Germany) Barbara Rittner	6–1, 6–2
Loss	1999	Miami Open	Hard	(United States) Mary Joe Fernández	(Switzerland) Martina Hingis (Czech Republic) Jana Novotná	6–0, 4–6, 6–7^{(1–7)}

== WTA Tour finals ==
=== Singles: 85 (53 titles, 32 runner-ups) ===
Legend Grand Slam tournaments (9–4) Finals (3–1) WTA 1000 (Category 4 / Tier I) (10–11) WTA 500 (Tier II) (21–13) WTA 250 (Tier III, IV & V) (10–3)	Surface Hard (28–16) Clay (14–6) Grass (1–1) Carpet (10–9)

Result	W–L	Date	Tournament	Tier	Surface	Opponent	Score
Win	1–0	Apr 1989	Virginia Slims of Houston, United States	Category 4	Clay	(United States) Chris Evert	3–6, 6–1, 6–4
Loss	1–1	Sep 1989	Virginia Slims of Dallas, United States	Category 4	Carpet (i)	(United States) Martina Navratilova	6–7^{(2–7)}, 3–6
Loss	1–2	Oct 1989	Brighton International, United Kingdom	Category 4	Carpet (i)	(Germany) Steffi Graf	5–7, 4–6
Win	2–2	Mar 1990	Miami Open, United States	Tier I	Hard	(Austria) Judith Wiesner	6–1, 6–2
Win	3–2	Apr 1990	U.S. Women's Hardcourt Championships, United States	Tier III	Hard	(Switzerland) Manuela Maleeva-Fragniere	6–4, 6–3
Win	4–2	Apr 1990	Eckerd Open, United States	Tier III	Clay	(Bulgaria) Katerina Maleeva	6–1, 6–0
Win	5–2	May 1990	Italian Open, Italy	Tier I	Clay	(United States) Martina Navratilova (2)	6–1, 6–1
Win	6–2	May 1990	Berlin Open, Germany	Tier I	Clay	(Germany) Steffi Graf (2)	6–4, 6–3
Win	7–2	Jun 1990	French Open, France	Grand Slam	Clay	(Germany) Steffi Graf (3)	7–6^{(8–6)}, 6–4
Win	8–2	Aug 1990	LA Championships, United States	Tier II	Hard	(United States) Martina Navratilova (3)	6–4, 3–6, 7–6^{(8–6)}
Win	9–2	Nov 1990	Silicon Valley Classic, United States	Tier II	Carpet (i)	(United States) Martina Navratilova (4)	6–3, 7–6^{(7–5)}
Win	10–2	Nov 1990	WTA Finals, United States	Finals	Carpet (i)	(Argentina) Gabriela Sabatini	6–4, 5–7, 3–6, 6–4, 6–2
Win	11–2	Jan 1991	Australian Open, Australia	Grand Slam	Hard	(Czechoslovakia) Jana Novotná	5–7, 6–3, 6–1
Loss	11–3	Feb 1991	Indian Wells Open, United States	Tier II	Hard	(United States) Martina Navratilova (5)	2–6, 6–7^{(2–7)}
Win	12–3	Mar 1991	Miami Open, United States (2)	Tier I	Hard	(Argentina) Gabriela Sabatini (2)	6–3, 7–5
Loss	12–4	Mar 1991	Connecticut Open, United States	Tier III	Hard	(Germany) Steffi Graf (4)	4–6, 3–6
Win	13–4	Apr 1991	Virginia Slims of Houston, United States (2)	Tier II	Clay	(United States) Mary Joe Fernández	6–4, 6–3
Loss	13–5	Apr 1991	Hamburg Open, Germany	Tier II	Clay	(Germany) Steffi Graf (5)	5–7, 7–6^{(7–4)}, 3–6
Loss	13–6	May 1991	Italian Open, Italy	Tier I	Clay	(Argentina) Gabriela Sabatini (3)	3–6, 2–6
Win	14–6	Jun 1991	French Open, France (2)	Grand Slam	Clay	(Spain) Arantxa Sánchez Vicario	6–3, 6–4
Loss	14–7	Jul 1991	Southern California Open, United States	Tier III	Hard	(United States) Jennifer Capriati	6–4, 1–6, 6–7^{(2–7)}
Win	15–7	Aug 1991	LA Championships, United States (2)	Tier II	Hard	(Empire of Japan) Kimiko Date	6–3, 6–1
Win	16–7	Sep 1991	US Open, United States	Grand Slam	Hard	(United States) Martina Navratilova (6)	7–6^{(7–1)}, 6–1
Win	17–7	Sep 1991	Nichirei International Championships, Japan	Tier II	Hard	(United States) Mary Joe Fernández (2)	6–1, 6–1
Win	18–7	Oct 1991	Milan Indoor, Italy	Tier III	Carpet (i)	(United States) Martina Navratilova (7)	6–3, 3–6, 6–4
Loss	18–8	Nov 1991	Silicon Valley Classic, United States	Tier II	Carpet (i)	(United States) Martina Navratilova (8)	3–6, 6–3, 3–6
Win	19–8	Nov 1991	Philadelphia Championships, United States	Tier II	Carpet (i)	(United States) Jennifer Capriati (2)	7–5, 6–1
Win	20–8	Nov 1991	WTA Finals, United States (2)	Finals	Carpet (i)	(United States) Martina Navratilova (9)	6–4, 3–6, 7–5, 6–0
Win	21–8	Jan 1992	Australian Open, Australia (2)	Grand Slam	Hard	(United States) Mary Joe Fernández (3)	6–2, 6–3
Win	22–8	Feb 1992	Faber Grand Prix, Germany	Tier II	Carpet (i)	(United States) Mary Joe Fernández (4)	6–0, 6–3
Win	23–8	Mar 1992	Indian Wells Open, United States	Tier II	Hard	(Spain) Conchita Martínez	6–3, 6–1
Win	24–8	Apr 1992	Virginia Slims of Houston, United States (3)	Tier II	Clay	(United States) Zina Garrison	6–1, 6–1
Win	25–8	Apr 1992	Spanish Open, Spain	Tier III	Clay	(Spain) Arantxa Sánchez Vicario (2)	3–6, 6–2, 6–3
Loss	25–9	May 1992	Italian Open, Italy	Tier I	Clay	(Argentina) Gabriela Sabatini (4)	5–7, 4–6
Win	26–9	Jun 1992	French Open, France (3)	Grand Slam	Clay	(Germany) Steffi Graf (6)	6–2, 3–6, 10–8
Loss	26–10	Jul 1992	Wimbledon Championships, United Kingdom	Grand Slam	Grass	(Germany) Steffi Graf (7)	2–6, 1–6
Loss	26–11	Aug 1992	LA Championships, United States	Tier II	Hard	(United States) Martina Navratilova (10)	4–6, 2–6
Loss	26–12	Aug 1992	Canadian Open, Canada	Tier I	Hard	(Spain) Arantxa Sánchez Vicario (3)	4–6, 6–3, 4–6
Win	27–12	Sep 1992	US Open, United States (2)	Grand Slam	Hard	(Spain) Arantxa Sánchez Vicario (4)	6–3, 6–3
Win	28–12	Sep 1992	Nichirei International Championships, Japan (2)	Tier II	Carpet (i)	(Argentina) Gabriela Sabatini (5)	6–2, 6–0
Win	29–12	Nov 1992	Silicon Valley Classic, United States (2)	Tier II	Carpet (i)	(United States) Martina Navratilova (11)	6–3, 6–4
Win	30–12	Nov 1992	WTA Finals, United States (3)	Finals	Carpet (i)	(United States) Martina Navratilova (12)	7–5, 6–3, 6–1
Win	31–12	Jan 1993	Australian Open, Australia (3)	Grand Slam	Hard	(Germany) Steffi Graf (8)	4–6, 6–3, 6–2
Win	32–12	Feb 1993	Ameritech Cup, United States	Tier II	Carpet (i)	(United States) Martina Navratilova (13)	3–6, 6–2, 6–1
Loss	32–13	Feb 1993	Open GDF Suez, France	Tier II	Carpet (i)	(United States) Martina Navratilova (14)	3–6, 6–4, 6–7^{(3–7)}
Win	33–13	Aug 1995	Canadian Open, Canada	Tier I	Hard	(South Africa) Amanda Coetzer	6–0, 6–1
Loss	33–14	Sep 1995	US Open, United States	Grand Slam	Hard	(Germany) Steffi Graf (9)	6–7^{(6–8)}, 6–0, 3–6
Win	34–14	Jan 1996	Sydney International, Australia	Tier II	Hard	(United States) Lindsay Davenport	4–6, 7–6^{(9–7)}, 6–3
Win	35–14	Jan 1996	Australian Open, Australia (4)	Grand Slam	Hard	(Germany) Anke Huber	6–4, 6–1
Win	36–14	Jun 1996	Eastbourne International, United Kingdom	Tier II	Grass	(United States) Mary Joe Fernández (5)	6–0, 6–2
Win	37–14	Aug 1996	Canadian Open, Canada (2)	Tier I	Hard	(Spain) Arantxa Sánchez Vicario (5)	6–1, 7–6^{(7–2)}
Loss	37–15	Sep 1996	US Open, United States	Grand Slam	Hard	(Germany) Steffi Graf (10)	5–7, 4–6
Win	38–15	Sep 1996	Nichirei International Championships, Japan (3)	Tier II	Hard	(Spain) Arantxa Sánchez Vicario (6)	6–1, 6–4
Loss	38–16	Nov 1996	Silicon Valley Classic, United States	Tier II	Carpet (i)	(Switzerland) Martina Hingis	2–6, 0–6
Loss	38–17	Mar 1997	Miami Open, United States	Tier I	Hard	(Switzerland) Martina Hingis (2)	2–6, 1–6
Loss	38–18	Apr 1997	Charleston Open, United States	Tier I	Clay (green)	(Switzerland) Martina Hingis (3)	6–3, 3–6, 6–7^{(5–7)}
Loss	38–19	May 1997	WTA Madrid Open, Spain	Tier III	Clay	(Czech Republic) Jana Novotná (2)	5–7, 1–6
Loss	38–20	Aug 1997	Southern California Open, United States	Tier II	Hard	(Switzerland) Martina Hingis (4)	6–7^{(4–7)}, 4–6
Win	39–20	Aug 1997	LA Championships, United States (3)	Tier II	Hard	(United States) Lindsay Davenport (2)	5–7, 7–5, 6–4
Win	40–20	Aug 1997	Canadian Open, Canada (3)	Tier I	Hard	(Germany) Anke Huber (2)	6–2, 6–4
Win	41–20	Sep 1997	Toyota Princess Cup, Japan	Tier II	Hard	(Spain) Arantxa Sánchez Vicario (7)	6–1, 3–6, 7–6^{(7–5)}
Loss	41–21	Jun 1998	French Open, France	Grand Slam	Clay	(Spain) Arantxa Sánchez Vicario (8)	6–7^{(5–7)}, 6–0, 2–6
Win	42–21	Aug 1998	Canadian Open, Canada (4)	Tier I	Hard	(Spain) Arantxa Sánchez Vicario (9)	6–3, 6–2
Win	43–21	Sep 1998	Toyota Princess Cup, Japan (2)	Tier II	Hard	(Spain) Arantxa Sánchez Vicario (10)	4–6, 6–3, 6–4
Loss	43–22	Oct 1998	Kremlin Cup, Russia	Tier I	Carpet (i)	(France) Mary Pierce	6–7^{(2–7)}, 3–6
Win	44–22	Apr 1999	Amelia Island Championships, United States	Tier II	Clay	(Romania) Ruxandra Dragomir	6–2, 6–3
Loss	44–23	Aug 1999	Canadian Open, Canada	Tier I	Hard	(Switzerland) Martina Hingis (5)	4–6, 4–6
Loss	44–24	Sep 1999	Toyota Princess Cup, Japan	Tier II	Hard	(United States) Lindsay Davenport (3)	5–7, 6–7^{(1–7)}
Win	45–24	Feb 2000	U.S. National Indoor Championships, United States	Tier III	Hard (I)	(France) Nathalie Dechy	6–1, 7–6^{(7–3)}
Win	46–24	Apr 2000	Amelia Island Championships, United States (2)	Tier II	Clay	(Spain) Conchita Martínez (2)	6–3, 6–2
Win	47–24	May 2000	Italian Open, Italy (2)	Tier I	Clay	(France) Amélie Mauresmo	6–2, 7–6^{(7–4)}
Loss	47–25	Aug 2000	Southern California Open, United States	Tier II	Hard	(United States) Venus Williams	0–6, 7–6^{(7–3)}, 3–6
Loss	47–26	Aug 2000	Connecticut Open, United States	Tier II	Hard	(United States) Venus Williams (2)	2–6, 4–6
Loss	47–27	Nov 2000	WTA Finals, United States	Finals	Carpet (i)	(Switzerland) Martina Hingis (6)	7–6^{(7–5)}, 4–6, 4–6
Win	48–27	Feb 2001	U.S. National Indoor Championships, United States (2)	Tier III	Hard (I)	(United States) Jennifer Capriati (3)	6–3, 5–7, 6–2
Loss	48–28	Aug 2001	Southern California Open, United States	Tier II	Hard	(United States) Venus Williams (3)	2–6, 3–6
Loss	48–29	Aug 2001	LA Championships, United States	Tier II	Hard	(United States) Lindsay Davenport (4)	3–6, 5–7
Win	49–29	Sep 2001	Brasil Open, Brazil	Tier II	Hard	(Federal Republic of Yugoslavia) Jelena Dokić	6–3, 6–3
Win	50–29	Oct 2001	Japan Open, Japan	Tier III	Hard	(Thailand) Tamarine Tanasugarn	6–3, 6–2
Win	51–29	Oct 2001	China Open, China	Tier IV	Hard	(Australia) Nicole Pratt	6–2, 6–3
Loss	51–30	Feb 2002	Pan Pacific Open, Japan	Tier I	Carpet (i)	(Switzerland) Martina Hingis (7)	6–7^{(6–8)}, 6–4, 3–6
Win	52–30	Feb 2002	Qatar Open, Qatar	Tier III	Hard	(Thailand) Tamarine Tanasugarn (2)	7–6^{(8–6)}, 6–3
Win	53–30	May 2002	WTA Madrid Open, Spain	Tier III	Clay	(United States) Chanda Rubin	6–4, 6–2
Loss	53–31	Feb 2003	Pan Pacific Open, Japan	Tier I	Carpet (i)	(United States) Lindsay Davenport (5)	7–6^{(8–6)}, 1–6, 2–6
Loss	53–32	Feb 2003	Dubai Championships, United Arab Emirates	Tier II	Hard	(Belgium) Justine Henin	6–4, 6–7^{(4–7)}, 5–7

=== Doubles: 9 (6 titles, 3 runner-ups) ===
Legend
WTA 1000 (Tier I) (3–1)
WTA 500 (Tier II) (3–2)

Result	W–L	Date	Tournament	Tier	Surface	Partner	Opponents	Score
Win	1–0	May 1990	Italian Open, Italy	Tier I	Clay	(Canada) Helen Kelesi	(Italy) Laura Garrone (Italy) Laura Golarsa	6–3, 6–4
Win	2–0	Mar 1991	Connecticut Open, United States	Tier II	Hard	(United States) Patty Fendick	(Canada) Jill Hetherington (United States) Kathy Rinaldi	7–6^{(7–2)}, 6–2
Win	3–0	May 1991	Italian Open, Italy (2)	Tier I	Clay	(United States) Jennifer Capriati	(Australia) Nicole Bradtke (South Africa) Elna Reinach	7–5, 6–2
Win	4–0	May 1992	Italian Open, Italy (3)	Tier I	Clay	(Czechoslovakia) Helena Suková	(Bulgaria) Katerina Maleeva (Austria) Barbara Rittner	6–1, 6–2
Win	5–0	Sep 1997	Toyota Princess Cup, Japan	Tier II	Hard	(Empire of Japan) Ai Sugiyama	(France) Julie Halard (United States) Chanda Rubin	6–1, 6–0
Loss	5–1	Nov 1997	Ameritech Cup, United States	Tier II	Carpet (i)	(United States) Lindsay Davenport	(France) Alexandra Fusai (France) Nathalie Tauziat	3–6, 2–6
Win	6–1	Sep 1998	Toyota Princess Cup, Japan (2)	Tier II	Hard	(Russia) Anna Kournikova	(United States) Mary Joe Fernández (Spain) Arantxa Sánchez	6–4, 6–4
Loss	6–2	Nov 1998	Philadelphia Championships, United States	Tier II	Carpet (i)	(Belarus) Natasha Zvereva	(Russia) Elena Likhovtseva (Japan) Ai Sugiyama	5–7, 6–4, 2–6
Loss	6–3	Mar 1999	Miami Open, United States	Tier I	Hard	(United States) Mary Joe Fernández	(Switzerland) Martina Hingis (Czech Republic) Jana Novotná	6–0, 4–6, 6–7^{(1–7)}

== Hopman Cup ==
=== Finals: 3 (1 titles, 2 runner-ups) ===
Result	W–L	Date	Tournament	Surface	Partner	Opponents	Score
Win	1–0	Jan 1991	Hopman Cup, Perth, Australia	Hard	(Socialist Federal Republic of Yugoslavia) Goran Prpić	(United States) Zina Garrison (United States) David Wheaton	3–0
Loss	1–1	Jan 2001	Hopman Cup, Perth, Australia	Hard	(United States) Jan-Michael Gambill	(Switzerland) Martina Hingis (Switzerland) Roger Federer	1–2
Loss	1–2	Jan 2002	Hopman Cup, Perth, Australia	Hard	(United States) Jan-Michael Gambill	(Spain) Arantxa Sánchez Vicario (Spain) Tommy Robredo	1–2

== Billie Jean King Cup (Fed Cup) ==
=== Finals: 3 titles ===
Result	W–L	Date	Tournament	Surface	Partner	Opponents	Score
Win	1–0	Sep 1996	Fed Cup, United States	Carpet (i)	(United States) Lindsay Davenport (United States) Mary Joe Fernández (United States) Linda Wild	(Spain) Conchita Martínez (Spain) Arantxa Sánchez Vicario (Spain) Gala León García (Spain) Virginia Ruano-Pascual	5–0
Win	2–0	Sep 1999	Fed Cup, United States	Hard			4–1
Win	3–0	Nov 2000	Fed Cup, United States	Carpet (i)	(United States) Lindsay Davenport (United States) Jennifer Capriati (United States) Lisa Raymond	(Spain) Conchita Martínez (Spain) Arantxa Sánchez Vicario (Spain) Virginia Ruano-Pascual (Spain) Magüi Serna	5–0

=== Participations ===
==== Singles: 17 (15 wins, 2 losses) ====
Edition	Round	Date	Venue	Against	Surface	Opponent	W/L	Result
1996	WG SF	Jul 1996	Nagoya, Japan	Japan	Carpet (i)	(Japan) Ai Sugiyama	W	6–2, 6–2
1996	WG SF	Jul 1996	Nagoya, Japan	Japan	Carpet (i)	(Japan) Kimiko Date	W	6–0, 6–2
1996	WG F	Sep 1996	Atlantic City, United States	Spain	Carpet (i)	(Spain) Conchita Martínez	W	6–2, 6–4
1996	WG F	Sep 1996	Atlantic City, United States	Spain	Carpet (i)	(Spain) Arantxa Sánchez Vicario	W	3–6, 6–3, 6–1
1998	WG QF	Apr 1998	Kiawah Island, United States	Netherlands	Clay	(Netherlands) Miriam Oremans	W	6–1, 6–2
1998	WG QF	Apr 1998	Kiawah Island, United States	Netherlands	Clay	(Netherlands) Amanda Hopmans	W	6–1, 6–2
1998	WG SF	Jul 1998	Madrid, Spain	Spain	Clay	(Spain) Conchita Martínez	W	6–3, 3–6, 6–1
1998	WG SF	Jul 1998	Madrid, Spain	Spain	Clay	(Spain) Arantxa Sánchez Vicario	W	6–4, 6–0
1999	WG QF	Apr 1999	Raleigh, United States	Croatia	Clay (i)	(Croatia) Silvija Talaja	W	6–3, 6–1
1999	WG QF	Apr 1999	Raleigh, United States	Croatia	Clay (i)	(Croatia) Iva Majoli	W	6–0, 6–3
1999	WG SF	Jul 1999	Ancona, Italy	Italy	Clay	(Italy) Silvia Farina	L	4–6, 6–4, 4–6
2000	WG SF	Nov 2000	Las Vegas, United States	Belgium	Carpet (i)	(Belgium) Justine Henin	W	7–6^{(7–1)}, 6–2
2000	WG F	Nov 2000	Las Vegas, United States	Spain	Carpet (i)	(Spain) Conchita Martínez	W	6–2, 6–3
2002	WG 1R	Apr 2002	Charlotte, United States	Austria	Clay	(Austria) Barbara Schwartz	L	6–7^{(7–9)}, 2–6
2002	WG 1R	Apr 2002	Charlotte, United States	Austria	Clay	(Austria) Evelyn Fauth	W	6–3, 6–3
2002	PO	Jul 2002	Springfield, United States	Israel	Hard	(Israel) Tzipora Obziler	W	6–4, 6–2
2002	PO	Jul 2002	Springfield, United States	Israel	Hard	(Israel) Anna Smashnova	W	6–4, 6–0

==== Doubles: 2 wins ====
Edition	Round	Date	Venue	Partnering	Against	Surface	Opponents	W/L	Result
1999	WG QF	Apr 1999	Raleigh, United States	(United States) Chanda Rubin	Croatia	Clay	(Croatia) Iva Majoli (Croatia) Silvija Talaja	W	6–3, 6–2
2002	WG QF	Apr 2002	Charlotte, United States	(United States) Lisa Raymond	Austria	Clay	(Austria) Evelyn Fauth (Austria) Marion Maruska	W	6–1, 7–6^{(7–4)}

== Career Grand Slam tournament seedings ==
The tournaments won by Seles are in boldface, and advanced into finals by Seles are in italics.

Legend seeded No. 1 (**6** / 7) seeded No. 2 (**3** / 9) seeded No. 3 (0 / 3) seeded No. 4–10 (0 / 15) seeded No. 11–32 (0 / 3) unseeded (0 / 1)	Longest streak 5 3 1 6 2 1

Year	Australian Open	French Open	Wimbledon	US Open
1989	did not play	not seeded	11th	12th
1990	did not play	**2nd (1)**	3rd	3rd
1991	**2nd (2)**	**1st (3)**	did not play	**2nd (4)**
1992	**1st (5)**	**1st (6)**	1st (1)	**1st (7)**
1993	**1st (8)**	did not play (Note: Due to being attacked in April 1993, Seles was absent from the tour for over two years until August 1995. At the time of the attack she was ranked No.1 in the world. On her return, the WTA decided that for her first six tournaments, she would be co-ranked world No.1 alongside Steffi Graf.)		
1994	did not play			
1995	did not play			2nd (2)
1996	**1st (9)**	2nd	2nd	2nd (3)
1997	did not play	3rd	2nd	2nd
1998	did not play	6th (4)	6th	6th
1999	6th	3rd	4th	4th
2000	did not play	3rd	6th	6th
2001	4th	did not play	did not play	7th
2002	8th	6th	4th	6th
2003	6th	12th	did not play	

== WTA Tour career earnings ==
**Year**	**Grand Slam titles (Note: Includes singles, doubles and mixed doubles titles.)**	**WTA titles**	**Total titles**	Earnings ($)	**Money list rank**
1990	1	8	9	1,637,222	2
1991	3	7	10	2,422,206	1
1992	3	7	10	2,622,352	1
1993	1	1	2	437,588	16
1994	DNP
1995	0	1	1	397,010	16
1996	1	4	5	1,154,499	5
1997	0	3	3	914,020	5
1998	0	2	2	1,021,672	6
1999	0	1	1	744,741	8
2000	0	3	3	1,140,850	5
2001	0	4	4	627,211	15
2002	0	2	2	1,096,630	8
2003	0	0	0	276,213	38
Career	9	44	53	14,891,762	13

== Record against other players ==
=== No. 1 wins ===
#	Player	Event	Surface	Round	Score	Outcome
1.	(Germany) Steffi Graf	1990 German Open	Clay	F	6–4, 6–3	**W**
2.	(Germany) Steffi Graf	1990 French Open	Clay	F	7–6^{(8–6)}, 6–4	**W**
3.	(Switzerland) Martina Hingis	1998 French Open	Clay	SF	6–3, 6–2	F
4.	(Switzerland) Martina Hingis	1998 Canadian Open	Hard	SF	4–6, 6–3, 6–2	**W**
5.	(Switzerland) Martina Hingis	2001 Southern California Open	Hard	SF	6–3, 6–4	F
6.	(Switzerland) Martina Hingis	2001 LA Championships	Hard	SF	6–3, 1–6, 6–4	F

=== Top 10 wins ===
Season	1989	1990	1991	1992	1993	1994	1995	1996	1997	1998	1999	2000	2001	2002	2003	Total
Wins	9	16	22	19	5	0	5	14	11	8	3	8	7	7	1	**135**

#	Player	vsRank	Event	Surface	Round	Score
**1989**
1.	(Bulgaria) Manuela Maleeva	7	Virginia Slims of Washington, United States	Carpet (i)	QF	6–2, 6–4
2.	(United States) Chris Evert	4	Virginia Slims of Houston, United States	Clay	F	3–6, 6–1, 6–4
3.	(United States) Zina Garrison	3	French Open, France	Clay	3R	6–3, 6–2
4.	(Bulgaria) Manuela Maleeva	7	French Open, France	Clay	QF	6–3, 7–5
5.	(Spain) Arantxa Sánchez	4	Virginia Slims of Dallas, United States	Carpet (i)	QF	6–4, 6–2
6.	(Canada) Helen Kelesi	10	Zurich Open, Switzerland	Carpet (i)	QF	6–0, 6–0
7.	(Australia) Hana Mandlíková	6	Brighton International, United Kingdom	Carpet (i)	QF	6–0, 6–1
8.	(Bulgaria) Manuela Maleeva	9	Brighton International, United Kingdom	Carpet (i)	SF	6–3, 6–2
9.	(Spain) Conchita Martínez	10	Virginia Slims Championships, United States	Carpet (i)	1R	6–0, 6–1
**1990**
10.	(Switzerland) Manuela Maleeva	9	Connecticut Open, United States	Hard	F	6–4, 6–3
11.	(Spain) Conchita Martínez	8	Eckerd Open, United States	Clay	SF	6–4, 6–0
12.	(Bulgaria) Katerina Maleeva	10	Eckerd Open, United States	Clay	F	6–1, 6–0
13.	(Switzerland) Manuela Maleeva	7	Italian Open, Italy	Clay	QF	6–0, 6–2
14.	(United States) Martina Navratilova	2	Italian Open, Italy	Clay	F	6–1, 6–1
15.	(Spain) Conchita Martínez	9	Berlin Open, Germany	Clay	QF	6–0, 6–3
16.	(Germany) Steffi Graf	1	Berlin Open, Germany	Clay	F	6–4, 6–3
17.	(Switzerland) Manuela Maleeva	9	French Open, France	Clay	QF	3–6, 6–1, 7–5
18.	(Germany) Steffi Graf	1	French Open, France	Clay	F	7–6^{(8–6)}, 6–4
19.	(United States) Mary Joe Fernández	9	LA Championships, United States	Hard	SF	6–1, 6–0
20.	(United States) Martina Navratilova	2	LA Championships, United States	Hard	F	6–4, 3–6, 7–6^{(8–6)}
21.	(United States) Zina Garrison	8	Silicon Valley Classic, United States	Carpet (i)	SF	6–1, 3–6, 6–2
22.	(United States) Martina Navratilova	2	Silicon Valley Classic, United States	Carpet (i)	F	6–3, 7–6^{(7–5)}
23.	(Spain) Arantxa Sánchez	7	Virginia Slims Championships, United States	Carpet (i)	QF	5–7, 7–6^{(8–6)}, 6–4
24.	(United States) Mary Joe Fernández	4	Virginia Slims Championships, United States	Carpet (i)	SF	6–3, 6–4
25.	(Argentina) Gabriela Sabatini	5	Virginia Slims Championships, United States	Carpet (i)	F	6–4, 5–7, 3–6, 6–4, 6–2
**1991**
26.	(United States) Mary Joe Fernández	4	Australian Open, Australia	Hard	SF	6–3, 0–6, 9–7
27.	(United States) Mary Joe Fernández	6	Miami Open, United States	Hard	SF	6–1, 6–3
28.	(Argentina) Gabriela Sabatini	4	Miami Open, United States	Hard	F	6–3, 7–5
29.	(United States) Mary Joe Fernández	5	Virginia Slims of Houston, United States	Clay	F	6–4, 6–3
30.	(Czechoslovakia) Helena Suková	10	Hamburg Open, Germany	Clay	QF	6–0, 6–1
31.	(Spain) Arantxa Sánchez	7	Hamburg Open, Germany	Clay	SF	6–2, 6–4
32.	(United States) Mary Joe Fernández	5	Italian Open, Italy	Clay	SF	7–5, 2–6, 6–4
33.	(Spain) Conchita Martínez	8	French Open, France	Clay	QF	6–0, 7–5
34.	(Argentina) Gabriela Sabatini	3	French Open, France	Clay	SF	6–4, 6–1
35.	(Spain) Arantxa Sánchez	6	French Open, France	Clay	F	6–3, 6–4
36.	(Spain) Arantxa Sánchez	4	LA Championships, United States	Hard	SF	6–7^{(5–7)}, 6–4, 6–4
37.	(United States) Jennifer Capriati	7	US Open, United States	Hard	SF	6–3, 3–6, 7–6^{(7–3)}
38.	(United States) Martina Navratilova	5	US Open, United States	Hard	F	7–6^{(7–1)}, 6–1
39.	(United States) Mary Joe Fernández	7	Pan Pacific Open, Japan	Hard	F	6–1, 6–1
40.	(Spain) Conchita Martínez	8	Milan Indoor, Italy	Carpet (i)	SF	6–3, 6–3
41.	(United States) Martina Navratilova	4	Milan Indoor, Italy	Carpet (i)	F	6–3, 3–6, 6–4
42.	(Switzerland) Manuela Maleeva	10	Silicon Valley Classic, United States	Carpet (i)	SF	6–2, 6–1
43.	(Spain) Arantxa Sánchez	5	Philadelphia Championships, United States	Carpet (i)	SF	6–1, 6–2
44.	(United States) Jennifer Capriati	6	Philadelphia Championships, United States	Carpet (i)	F	7–5, 6–1
45.	(United States) Mary Joe Fernández	8	Virginia Slims Championships, United States	Carpet (i)	QF	6–3, 6–2
46.	(Argentina) Gabriela Sabatini	3	Virginia Slims Championships, United States	Carpet (i)	SF	6–1, 6–1
47.	(United States) Martina Navratilova	4	Virginia Slims Championships, United States	Carpet (i)	F	6–4, 3–6, 7–5, 6–0
**1992**
48.	(Spain) Arantxa Sánchez	5	Australian Open, Australia	Hard	SF	6–2, 6–2
49.	(United States) Mary Joe Fernández	7	Australian Open, Australia	Hard	F	6–2, 6–3
50.	(United States) Mary Joe Fernández	7	Faber Grand Prix, Germany	Carpet (i)	F	6–0, 6–3
51.	(Spain) Conchita Martínez	8	Indian Wells Open, United States	Hard	F	6–4, 6–2
52.	(Switzerland) Manuela Maleeva	9	Spanish Open, Spain	Clay	SF	6–3, 6–1
53.	(Spain) Arantxa Sánchez	5	Spanish Open, Spain	Clay	F	3–6, 6–2, 6–3
54.	(United States) Jennifer Capriati	6	French Open, France	Clay	QF	6–2, 6–2
55.	(Argentina) Gabriela Sabatini	4	French Open, France	Clay	SF	6–3, 4–6, 6–4
56.	(Germany) Steffi Graf	2	French Open, France	Clay	F	6–2, 3–6, 10–8
57.	(United States) Martina Navratilova	4	Wimbledon, United Kingdom	Grass	SF	6–2, 6–7^{(3–7)}, 6–4
58.	(Spain) Arantxa Sánchez	5	LA Championships, United States	Hard	SF	6–3, 6–2
59.	(United States) Mary Joe Fernández	7	US Open, United States	Hard	SF	6–3, 6–2
60.	(Spain) Arantxa Sánchez	5	US Open, United States	Hard	F	6–3, 6–3
61.	(United States) Mary Joe Fernández	7	Pan Pacific Open, Japan	Carpet (i)	SF	6–0, 3–6, 6–4
62.	(Argentina) Gabriela Sabatini	3	Pan Pacific Open, Japan	Carpet (i)	F	6–2, 6–0
63.	(United States) Martina Navratilova	4	Silicon Valley Classic, United States	Carpet (i)	F	6–3, 6–4
64.	(Czechoslovakia) Jana Novotná	10	Virginia Slims Championships, United States	Carpet (i)	QF	3–6, 6–4, 6–1
65.	(Argentina) Gabriela Sabatini	3	Virginia Slims Championships, United States	Carpet (i)	SF	7–6^{(8–6)}, 6–1
66.	(United States) Martina Navratilova	4	Virginia Slims Championships, United States	Carpet (i)	F	7–5, 6–3, 6–1
**1993**
67.	(Argentina) Gabriela Sabatini	3	Australian Open, Australia	Hard	SF	6–1, 6–2
68.	(Germany) Steffi Graf	2	Australian Open, Australia	Hard	F	4–6, 6–3, 6–2
69.	(United States) Mary Joe Fernández	7	Ameritech Cup, United States	Carpet (i)	SF	6–3, 6–0
70.	(United States) Martina Navratilova	3	Ameritech Cup, United States	Carpet (i)	F	3–6, 6–2, 6–1
71.	(Spain) Conchita Martínez	8	Open GDF Suez, France	Carpet (i)	SF	6–1, 6–1
**1995**
72.	(Germany) Anke Huber	10	Canadian Open, Canada	Hard	QF	6–3, 6–2
73.	(Argentina) Gabriela Sabatini	8	Canadian Open, Canada	Hard	SF	6–1, 6–0
74.	(Germany) Anke Huber	10	US Open, United States	Hard	4R	6–1, 6–4
75.	(Czechoslovakia) Jana Novotná	4	US Open, United States	Hard	QF	7–6^{(7–5)}, 6–2
76.	(Spain) Conchita Martínez	3	US Open, United States	Hard	SF	6–2, 6–2
**1996**
77.	(Netherlands) Brenda Schultz	10	Sydney International, Australia	Hard	SF	7–6^{(8–6)}, 6–4
78.	(United States) Lindsay Davenport	6	Sydney International, Australia	Hard	F	4–6, 7–6^{(9–7)}, 6–3
79.	(Croatia) Iva Majoli	8	Australian Open, Australia	Hard	QF	6–1, 6–2
80.	(United States) Chanda Rubin	10	Australian Open, Australia	Hard	SF	6–7^{(2–7)}, 6–1, 7–5
81.	(Germany) Anke Huber	9	Australian Open, Australia	Hard	F	6–4, 6–1
82.	(United States) Mary Joe Fernández	9	Eastbourne International, United Kingdom	Grass	F	6–0, 6–2
83.	(Japan) Kimiko Date	8	Fed Cup Semifinals, Nagoya, Japan	Carpet (i)	SF	6–0, 6–2
84.	(Bulgaria) Magdalena Maleeva	10	Canadian Open, Canada	Hard	QF	6–4, 6–2
85.	(Spain) Arantxa Sánchez	2	Canadian Open, Canada	Hard	F	6–1, 7–6^{(7–2)}
86.	(Spain) Conchita Martínez	3	US Open, United States	Hard	SF	6–4, 6–3
87.	(Japan) Kimiko Date	8	Pan Pacific Open, Japan	Hard	SF	6–4, 1–6, 7–6^{(8–6)}
88.	(Spain) Arantxa Sánchez	2	Pan Pacific Open, Japan	Hard	F	6–1, 6–4
89.	(Spain) Conchita Martínez	3	Fed Cup Final, Atlantic City, US	Carpet (i)	F	6–2, 6–4
90.	(Spain) Arantxa Sánchez	2	Fed Cup Final, Atlantic City, US	Carpet (i)	F	3–6, 6–3, 6–1
**1997**
91.	(Romania) Irina Spîrlea	8	Miami Open, United States	Hard	QF	3–6, 6–2, 6–3
92.	(Austria) Barbara Paulus	10	Miami Open, United States	Hard	SF	6–1, 6–0
93.	(Germany) Anke Huber	7	Charleston Open, United States	Clay (green)	QF	6–3, 6–0
94.	(Spain) Conchita Martínez	6	Charleston Open, United States	Clay (green)	SF	6–3, 6–4
95.	(France) Mary Pierce	10	French Open, France	Clay	4R	6–4, 7–5
96.	(South Africa) Amanda Coetzer	6	Southern California Open, United States	Hard	SF	6–3, 6–4
97.	(United States) Lindsay Davenport	8	LA Championships, United States	Hard	F	5–7, 7–5, 6–4
98.	(Spain) Conchita Martínez	9	Canadian Open, Canada	Hard	SF	6–2, 7–6^{(8–6)}
99.	(Germany) Anke Huber	8	Canadian Open, Canada	Hard	F	6–2, 6–4
100.	(France) Mary Pierce	10	US Open, United States	Hard	4R	1–6, 6–2, 6–2
101.	(Spain) Arantxa Sánchez	10	Pan Pacific Open, Japan	Hard	F	6–1, 3–6, 7–6^{(7–5)}
**1998**
102.	(Czechoslovakia) Jana Novotná	3	French Open, France	Clay	QF	4–6, 6–3, 6–3
103.	(Switzerland) Martina Hingis	1	French Open, France	Clay	SF	6–3, 6–2
104.	(Spain) Conchita Martínez	7	Fed Cup Semifinals, Madrid, Spain	Clay	SF	6–3, 3–6, 6–1
105.	(Spain) Arantxa Sánchez	4	Fed Cup Semifinals, Madrid, Spain	Clay	SF	6–4, 6–0
106.	(Switzerland) Martina Hingis	1	Canadian Open, Canada	Hard	SF	4–6, 6–3, 6–2
107.	(Spain) Arantxa Sánchez	4	Canadian Open, Canada	Hard	F	6–3, 6–2
108.	(Spain) Arantxa Sánchez	4	Pan Pacific Open, Japan	Hard	F	4–6, 6–3, 6–4
109.	(Belarus) Natasha Zvereva	10	Philadelphia Championships, United States	Carpet (i)	QF	6–0, 6–1
**1999**
110.	(Germany) Steffi Graf	8	Australian Open, Australia	Hard	QF	7–5, 6–1
111.	(Austria) Barbara Schett	9	Canadian Open, Canada	Hard	QF	6–3, 3–6, 6–1
112.	(South Africa) Amanda Coetzer	7	Connecticut Open, United States	Hard	QF	6–2, 6–1
**2000**
113.	(Russia) Anna Kournikova	10	Miami Open, United States	Hard	SF	6–1, 3–6, 6–0
114.	(Spain) Conchita Martínez	8	Amelia Island Championships, United States	Hard	F	6–3, 6–2
115.	(Spain) Arantxa Sánchez	9	Wimbledon, United Kingdom	Grass	4R	6–3, 6–4
116.	(France) Sandrine Testud	10	Southern California Open, United States	Hard	QF	4–6, 6–2, 7–6^{(7–5)}
117.	(France) Nathalie Tauziat	8	Connecticut Open, United States	Hard	SF	2–6, 6–2, 6–1
118.	(Belgium) Dominique Monami	10	Summer Olympics, Sydney, Australia	Hard	QF	6–0, 6–2
119.	(Russia) Elena Dementieva	10	WTA Tour Championships, United States	Carpet (i)	SF	6–1, 7–6^{(7–4)}
120.	(Spain) Conchita Martínez	5	Fed Cup Final, Las Vegas, US	Carpet (i)	F	6–2, 6–3
**2001**
121.	(United States) Jennifer Capriati	6	U.S. National Indoor Championships, United States	Hard (i)	F	6–3, 5–7, 6–2
122.	(United States) Jennifer Capriati	2	Southern California Open, United States	Hard	QF	6–3, 6–3
123.	(Switzerland) Martina Hingis	1	Southern California Open, United States	Hard	SF	6–3, 6–4
124.	(United States) Serena Williams	8	LA Championships, United States	Hard	QF	6–2, 3–6, 7–6^{(7–2)}
125.	(Switzerland) Martina Hingis	1	LA Championships, United States	Hard	SF	6–3, 1–6, 6–4
126.	(Belgium) Justine Henin	6	Canadian Open, Canada	Hard	QF	1–6, 6–2, 6–2
127.	(Serbia and Montenegro) Jelena Dokic	10	Brasil Open, Brasil	Hard	F	6–3, 6–3
**2002**
128.	(United States) Venus Williams	3	Australian Open, Australia	Hard	QF	6–7^{(4–7)}, 6–2, 6–3
129.	(Belgium) Justine Henin	7	Open GDF Suez, France	Carpet (i)	QF	6–4, 6–3
130.	(Italy) Silvia Farina Elia	9	Miami Open, United States	Hard	4R	7–6^{(7–4)}, 6–4
131.	(Belgium) Kim Clijsters	5	Miami Open, United States	Hard	QF	4–6, 6–3, 6–3
132.	(Slovakia) Daniela Hantuchová	10	French Open, France	Clay	4R	6–4, 7–5
133.	(Switzerland) Martina Hingis	8	US Open, United States	Hard	4R	6–4, 6–2
134.	(United States) Lindsay Davenport	10	WTA Tour Championships, United States	Hard (i)	1R	3–6, 7–6^{(8–6)}, 6–3
**2003**
135.	(France) Amélie Mauresmo	7	Dubai Championships, United Arab Emirates	Hard	SF	6–3, 2–2, ret.

== Longest winning streaks ==
=== 36-match win streak (1990) ===
#	Tournament	Category	Start date	Surface	Round	Opponent	Rank	Score
–	Virginia Slims of Florida	Tier II	5 March 1990	Hard	3R	(Peru) Laura Gildermeister (10)	21	1–6, 5–7
1	Miami Open	Tier I	12 March 1990	Hard	2R	(United States) Linda Wild (LL)	109	6–1, 6–4
2	Miami Open	Tier I	12 March 1990	Hard	3R	(Italy) Laura Lapi	78	6–1, 6–1
3	Miami Open	Tier I	12 March 1990	Hard	4R	(South Africa) Rosalyn Fairbank (13)	21	6–3, 6–4
4	Miami Open	Tier I	12 March 1990	Hard	QF	(France) Nathalie Herreman	112	6–3, 6–1
5	Miami Open	Tier I	12 March 1990	Hard	SF	(France) Nathalie Tauziat (9)	15	6–3, 6–1
6	Miami Open	Tier I	12 March 1990	Hard	F	(Austria) Judith Wiesner (15)	28	6–1, 6–2
7	U.S. National Indoor Championships	Tier III	26 March 1990	Hard	1R	(United States) Anne Smith	28	6–3, 7–5
8	U.S. National Indoor Championships	Tier III	26 March 1990	Hard	QF	(Australia) Hana Mandlíková	27	6–4, 6–4
9	U.S. National Indoor Championships	Tier III	26 March 1990	Hard	SF	(South Africa) Rosalyn Fairbank	21	6–3, 6–0
10	U.S. National Indoor Championships	Tier III	26 March 1990	Hard	F	(Switzerland) Manuela Maleeva-Fragnière (3)	9	6–4, 6–3
11	Eckerd Open	Tier III	16 April 1990	Clay	1R	(United States) Sandy Collins (LL)	169	6–1, 6–1
12	Eckerd Open	Tier III	16 April 1990	Clay	2R	(United States) Donna Faber	67	6–0, 6–1
13	Eckerd Open	Tier III	16 April 1990	Clay	QF	(United States) Susan Sloane (8)	36	6–2, 6–0
14	Eckerd Open	Tier III	16 April 1990	Clay	SF	(Spain) Conchita Martínez (3)	8	6–4, 6–0
15	Eckerd Open	Tier III	16 April 1990	Clay	F	(Bulgaria) Katerina Maleeva (4)	10	6–1, 6–0
16	Italian Open	Tier I	7 May 1990	Clay	2R	(Czechoslovakia) Radka Zrubáková	38	6–4, 6–1
17	Italian Open	Tier I	7 May 1990	Clay	3R	(Argentina) Mercedes Paz	92	6–1, 6–1
18	Italian Open	Tier I	7 May 1990	Clay	QF	(Switzerland) Manuela Maleeva-Fragnière (5)	7	6–0, 6–2
19	Italian Open	Tier I	7 May 1990	Clay	SF	(Canada) Helen Kelesi (11)	24	6–1, 6–2
20	Italian Open	Tier I	7 May 1990	Clay	F	(United States) Martina Navratilova (1)	2	6–1, 6–1
21	German Open	Tier I	14 May 1990	Clay	2R	(Netherlands) Nicole Jagerman	43	6–1, 6–0
22	German Open	Tier I	14 May 1990	Clay	3R	(Bulgaria) Magdalena Maleeva	182	6–2, 6–3
23	German Open	Tier I	14 May 1990	Clay	QF	(Spain) Conchita Martínez (6)	10	6–0, 6–3
24	German Open	Tier I	14 May 1990	Clay	SF	(Italy) Sandra Cecchini	32	6–1, 6–3
25	German Open	Tier I	14 May 1990	Clay	F	(West Germany) Steffi Graf (1)	1	6–4, 6–3
26	French Open	Grand Slam	28 May 1990	Clay	1R	(Italy) Katia Piccolini	100	6–0, 6–0
27	French Open	Grand Slam	28 May 1990	Clay	2R	(Canada) Helen Kelesi	19	4–6, 6–4, 6–4
28	French Open	Grand Slam	28 May 1990	Clay	3R	(Soviet Union) Leila Meskhi	25	7–6^{(7–4)}, 7–6^{(7–4)}
29	French Open	Grand Slam	28 May 1990	Clay	4R	(Peru) Laura Gildermeister (16)	18	6–4, 6–0
30	French Open	Grand Slam	28 May 1990	Clay	QF	(Switzerland) Manuela Maleeva-Fragnière (6)	9	3–6, 6–1, 7–5
31	French Open	Grand Slam	28 May 1990	Clay	SF	(United States) Jennifer Capriati	24	6–2, 6–2
32	French Open	Grand Slam	28 May 1990	Clay	F	(West Germany) Steffi Graf (1)	1	7–6^{(8–6)}, 6–4
33	Wimbledon Championships	Grand Slam	25 June 1990	Grass	1R	(Sweden) Maria Strandlund	85	6–2, 6–0
34	Wimbledon Championships	Grand Slam	25 June 1990	Grass	2R	(United States) Camille Benjamin	114	6–3, 7–5
35	Wimbledon Championships	Grand Slam	25 June 1990	Grass	3R	(Australia) Anne Minter	58	6–3, 6–3
36	Wimbledon Championships	Grand Slam	25 June 1990	Grass	4R	(United States) Ann Henricksson	98	6–1, 6–0
–	Wimbledon Championships	Grand Slam	25 June 1990	Grass	QF	(United States) Zina Garrison (5)	5	6–3, 3–6, 7–9

=== 41-match Grand Slam win streak (1991–92) ===
Streak no	Tournament	Start date	Surface	Round	Opponent	Rank	Score
Last loss	1990 US Open	August 27, 1990	Hard	3R	(Italy) Linda Ferrando	82	6–1, 1–6, 6–7^{(3–7)}
1	1991 Australian Open	January 14, 1991	Hard	R1	(Germany) Sabine Hack	53	6–0, 6–0
2	1991 Australian Open	January 14, 1991	Hard	R2	(Italy) Cathy Caverzasio	43	6–1, 6–0
3	1991 Australian Open	January 14, 1991	Hard	R3	(Luxembourg) Karin Kschwendt	118	6–3, 6–1
4	1991 Australian Open	January 14, 1991	Hard	R4	(France) Catherine Tanvier	80	6–2, 6–1
5	1991 Australian Open	January 14, 1991	Hard	QF	(Germany) Anke Huber	35	6–3, 6–1
6	1991 Australian Open	January 14, 1991	Hard	SF	(United States) Mary Joe Fernández	4	6–3, 0–6, 9–7
7	1991 Australian Open	January 14, 1991	Hard	**W**	(Czechoslovakia) Jana Novotná	3	5–7, 6–3, 6–1
8	1991 French Open	May 27, 1991	Clay	R1	(Czechoslovakia) Radka Zrubáková	26	6–3, 6–0
9	1991 French Open	May 27, 1991	Clay	R2	(South Africa) Mariaan de Swardt	91	6–0, 6–2
10	1991 French Open	May 27, 1991	Clay	R3	(France) Karine Quentrec	78	6–1, 6–2
11	1991 French Open	May 27, 1991	Clay	R4	(Italy) Sandra Cecchini	22	3–6, 6–3, 6–0
12	1991 French Open	May 27, 1991	Clay	QF	(Spain) Conchita Martínez	8	6–0, 7–5
13	1991 French Open	May 27, 1991	Clay	SF	(Argentina) Gabriela Sabatini	3	6–4, 6–1
14	1991 French Open	May 27, 1991	Clay	**W**	(Spain) Arantxa Sánchez Vicario	6	6–3, 6–4
15	1991 US Open	August 26, 1991	Hard	R1	(United States) Nicole Arendt	209	6–2, 6–0
16	1991 US Open	August 26, 1991	Hard	R2	(Switzerland) Emanuela Zardo	35	6–0, 4–6, 6–0
17	1991 US Open	August 26, 1991	Hard	R3	(United Kingdom) Sara Gomer	105	6–1, 6–4
18	1991 US Open	August 26, 1991	Hard	R4	(Czechoslovakia) Regina Rajchrtová	45	6–1, 6–1
19	1991 US Open	August 26, 1991	Hard	QF	(United States) Gigi Fernández	23	6–1, 6–2
20	1991 US Open	August 26, 1991	Hard	SF	(United States) Jennifer Capriati	7	6–3, 3–6, 7–6^{(7–3)}
21	1991 US Open	August 26, 1991	Hard	**W**	(United States) Martina Navratilova	5	7–6^{(7–1)}, 6–1
22	1992 Australian Open	January 13, 1992	Hard	R1	(Japan) Akiko Kijimuta	113	6–2, 6–0
23	1992 Australian Open	January 13, 1992	Hard	R2	(Japan) Kimiko Date	32	6–2, 7–5
24	1992 Australian Open	January 13, 1992	Hard	R3	(Indonesia) Yayuk Basuki	35	6–1, 6–1
25	1992 Australian Open	January 13, 1992	Hard	R4	(Commonwealth of Independent States) Leila Meskhi	16	6–4, 4–6, 6–2
26	1992 Australian Open	January 13, 1992	Hard	QF	(Germany) Anke Huber	12	7–5, 6–3
27	1992 Australian Open	January 13, 1992	Hard	SF	(Spain) Arantxa Sánchez Vicario	5	6–2, 6–2
28	1992 Australian Open	January 13, 1992	Hard	**W**	(United States) Mary Joe Fernández	7	6–2, 6–3
29	1992 French Open	May 25, 1992	Clay	R1	(France) Catherine Mothes-Jobkel	79	6–1, 6–0
30	1992 French Open	May 25, 1992	Clay	R2	(Germany) Karin Kschwendt	200	6–2, 6–2
31	1992 French Open	May 25, 1992	Clay	R3	(United States) Lori McNeil	27	6–0, 6–1
32	1992 French Open	May 25, 1992	Clay	R4	(Japan) Akiko Kijimuta	150	6–1, 3–6, 6–4
33	1992 French Open	May 25, 1992	Clay	QF	(United States) Jennifer Capriati	6	6–2, 6–2
34	1992 French Open	May 25, 1992	Clay	SF	(Argentina) Gabriela Sabatini	4	6–3, 4–6, 6–4
35	1992 French Open	May 25, 1992	Clay	**W**	(Germany) Steffi Graf	2	6–2, 3–6, 10–8
36	1992 Wimbledon	June 22, 1992	Grass	R1	(Australia) Jenny Byrne	69	6–2, 6–2
37	1992 Wimbledon	June 22, 1992	Grass	R2	(Belgium) Sabine Appelmans	21	6–3, 6–2
38	1992 Wimbledon	June 22, 1992	Grass	R3	(Peru) Laura Gildermeister	25	6–4, 6–1
39	1992 Wimbledon	June 22, 1992	Grass	R4	(United States) Gigi Fernández	26	6–4, 6–2
40	1992 Wimbledon	June 22, 1992	Grass	QF	(France) Nathalie Tauziat	13	6–1, 6–3
41	1992 Wimbledon	June 22, 1992	Grass	SF	(United States) Martina Navratilova	4	6–2, 6–7^{(3–7)}, 6–4
End of streak	1992 Wimbledon	June 22, 1992	Grass	F	(Germany) Steffi Graf	2	2–6, 1–6
