= 1990 Lufthansa Cup German Open =

- Date: 14–20 May
- Edition: 79th
- Category: Tier I
- Draw: 56S / 28D
- Prize money: $500,000
- Surface: Clay / outdoor
- Location: West Berlin, West Germany
- Venue: Rot-Weiss Tennis Club

Champions

Singles
- (Socialist Federal Republic of Yugoslavia) Monica Seles

Doubles
- (Australia) Nicole Provis / (South Africa) Elna Reinach
- WTA German Open

The 1990 Lufthansa Cup German Open was a women's tennis tournament played on outdoor clay courts at the Rot-Weiss Tennis Club in West Berlin, West Germany that was part of the Tier I category of the 1990 WTA Tour. It was the 79th edition of the tournament and was held from 14 May until 20 May 1990. Second-seeded Monica Seles won the singles title, snapping world no.1 Steffi Graf's 66-match winning streak in the final (2nd in WTA history behind Martina Navratilova's 74-match winning streak).

== Finals ==
=== Singles ===
(Socialist Federal Republic of Yugoslavia) Monica Seles defeated (Germany) Steffi Graf 6–4, 6–3

- It was Seles' 5th singles title of the year and the 6th of her career.

=== Doubles ===
(Australia) Nicole Provis / (South Africa) Elna Reinach defeated (Australia) Hana Mandlíková / (Czechoslovakia) Jana Novotná 6–2, 6–1
