= 1990 Lufthansa Cup German Open – Doubles =

Doubles
- 1990 Lufthansa Cup German Open

Final
- Champions: (Australia) Nicole Provis (South Africa) Elna Reinach
- Runners-up: (Australia) Hana Mandlíková (Czechoslovakia) Jana Novotná
- Score: 6–2, 6–1

Details
- Draw: 28
- Seeds: 8

Events
Singles	Doubles
← 1989 ·	WTA German Open	· 1991 →

The defending champions were Elizabeth Smylie Janine Tremelling, but Smylie chose not to participate. Tremelling, partnered Jenny Byrne, but lost in the first round to Samantha Smith and Hellas ter Riet. Nicole Provis and Elna Reinach won the title, defeating Hana Mandlíková and Jana Novotná in the final, 6–2, 6–1.

== Seeds ==
The top four seeds received a bye to the second round.

1. (Soviet Union) Larisa Savchenko / (Soviet Union) Natalia Zvereva (quarterfinal)
2. (Australia) Hana Mandlíková / (Czechoslovakia) Jana Novotná (final)
3. (United States) Mary Joe Fernández / (United States) Betsy Nagelsen (second round)
4. (United States) Katrina Adams / (United States) Lori McNeil (semifinal)
5. (United States) Elise Burgin / (Argentina) Mercedes Paz (quarterfinal)
6. (Australia) Nicole Provis / (South Africa) Elna Reinach (champions)
7. (Soviet Union) Natalia Medvedeva / (Soviet Union) Leila Meskhi (first round)
8. (Italy) Sandra Cecchini / (Argentina) Patricia Tarabini (second round)

== Draw ==
=== Key ===
- Q = Qualifier
- WC = Wild card
- LL = Lucky loser
- Alt = Alternate
- SE = Special exempt
- PR = Protected ranking
- ITF = ITF entry
- JE = Junior exempt
- w/o = Walkover
- r = Retired
- d = Defaulted
- SR = Special ranking

=== Finals ===
Semifinals
6	(Australia) Nicole Provis (South Africa) Elna Reinach	6	2	6
(Australia) Kristine Radford (United States) Jill Smoller	2	6	0
4	(United States) Katrina Adams (United States) Lori McNeil	4	1
2	(Australia) Hana Mandlíková (Czechoslovakia) Jana Novotná	6	6

Final
6	(Australia) Nicole Provis (South Africa) Elna Reinach	6	6
2	(Australia) Hana Mandlíková (Czechoslovakia) Jana Novotná	2	1

=== Top half ===
First round
(Argentina) F Labat (United States) L Spadea	3	3
(South Africa) L Barnard (Australia) L Field	6	6
(Argentina) G Castro (Spain) C Martínez	2	7	6
(France) I Demongeot (France) C Tanvier	6	5	7
(Hungary) A Temesvári-Trunkos (Czechoslovakia) R Rajchrtová	4	6
6	(Australia) N Provis (South Africa) E Reinach	6	7
(United States) A Grossman (Canada) R Simpson	7	3	1
(Australia) J Faull (Australia) R McQuillan	6	6	6
(Denmark) S Albinus (Argentina) A Villagrán	0	6	6
(Australia) K Radford (United States) J Smoller	6	2	7
(Sweden) C Dahlman (West Germany) W Probst	6	3	2
8	(Italy) S Cecchini (Argentina) P Tarabini	2	6	6

Second round
1	(Soviet Union) L Savchenko (Soviet Union) N Zvereva	6	6
(South Africa) L Barnard (Australia) L Field	3	1
(France) I Demongeot (France) C Tanvier	3	4
6	(Australia) N Provis (South Africa) E Reinach	6	6
3	(United States) M Joe Fernández (United States) B Nagelsen
(Australia) J Faull (Australia) R McQuillan	w/o
(Australia) K Radford (United States) J Smoller	7	6
(Italy) S Cecchini (Argentina) P Tarabini	4	4

Quarterfinals
1	(Soviet Union) L Savchenko (Soviet Union) N Zvereva	3	4
6	(Australia) N Provis (South Africa) E Reinach	6	6
(Australia) J Faull (Australia) R McQuillan	5	6	6
(Australia) K Radford (United States) J Smoller	7	4	6

Semifinals
6	(Australia) Nicole Provis (South Africa) Elna Reinach	6	2	6
(Australia) Kristine Radford (United States) Jill Smoller	2	6	0

=== Bottom half ===
First round
7	(Soviet Union) N Medvedeva (Soviet Union) L Meskhi	6	4	6
(Peru) L Gildemeister (Denmark) T Scheuer-Larsen	2	6	7
(West Germany) C Kohde-Kilsch (Netherlands) B Schultz	2	4
(Argentina) B Fulco (Czechoslovakia) R Zrubáková	6	6
(Australia) M Jaggard (Australia) T Morton	6	7
(West Germany) S Meier (West Germany) B Rittner	2	4
5	(United States) E Burgin (Argentina) M Paz	6	6
(West Germany) E Pfaff (United States) K Rinaldi	2	1
(France) N Tauziat (Austria) J Wiesner	6	4
(United States) S Stafford (United States) T Whitlinger	7	6
(Australia) J Byrne (Australia) J Tremelling	6	2
(United Kingdom) S Smith (Netherlands) H ter Riet	7	6

Second round
(Peru) L Gildemeister (Denmark) T Scheuer-Larsen	1	5
(Argentina) B Fulco (Czechoslovakia) R Zrubáková	7	6
(Australia) M Jaggard (Australia) T Morton	5	1
4	(United States) K Adams (United States) L McNeil	7	6
5	(United States) E Burgin (Argentina) M Paz	6	4	6
(United States) S Stafford (United States) T Whitlinger	2	6	2
(United Kingdom) S Smith (Netherlands) H ter Riet	2	4
2	(Australia) H Mandlíková (Czechoslovakia) J Novotná	6	6

Quarterfinals
(Peru) L Gildemeister (Denmark) T Scheuer-Larsen	4	3
4	(United States) K Adams (United States) L McNeil	6	6
5	(United States) E Burgin (Argentina) M Paz	4	3
2	(Australia) H Mandlíková (Czechoslovakia) J Novotná	6	6

Semifinals
4	(United States) Katrina Adams (United States) Lori McNeil	4	1
2	(Australia) Hana Mandlíková (Czechoslovakia) Jana Novotná	6	6
