= 1990 Lufthansa Cup German Open – Singles =

Singles
- 1990 Lufthansa Cup German Open

Final
- Champion: (Socialist Federal Republic of Yugoslavia) Monica Seles
- Runner-up: (Germany) Steffi Graf
- Score: 6–4, 6–3

Details
- Draw: 56 (7Q)
- Seeds: 16

Events
Singles	Doubles
- WTA German Open

Monica Seles defeated the 2-time defending champion Steffi Graf in the final, 6–4, 6–3 to win the singles tennis title at the 1990 WTA German Open. Graf would make 7 German Open finals from 1988 to 1994, and this would be her only defeat.

Seles didn’t drop a set en route to the title and dropped just 19 games. The week prior at the Italian Open, Seles also didn’t drop a set and lost just 14 games.

== Seeds ==
The top 8 seeds received a bye to the second round.

1. (West Germany) Steffi Graf (final)
2. (Socialist Federal Republic of Yugoslavia) Monica Seles (champion)
3. (Argentina) Gabriela Sabatini (third round)
4. (United States) Mary Joe Fernández (third round)
5. (Bulgaria) Katerina Maleeva (third round)
6. (Spain) Conchita Martínez (quarterfinal)
7. (Czechoslovakia) Jana Novotná (quarterfinal)
8. (Soviet Union) Natalia Zvereva (semifinal)
9. (Austria) Judith Wiesner (quarterfinal)
10. (France) Nathalie Tauziat (quarterfinal)
11. n/a
12. (West Germany) Isabel Cueto (first round)
13. n/a
14. (Soviet Union) Leila Meskhi (quarterfinal)
15. (Sweden) Catarina Lindqvist (second round)
16. (Australia) Hana Mandlíková (second round)

== Draw ==
Key

- Q = Qualifier
- WC = Wild card
- LL = Lucky loser
- Alt = Alternate
- ITF = ITF entry
- PR = Protected ranking
- SR = Special ranking
- SE = Special exempt
- JE = Junior exempt
- JR = Junior Accelerator Programme entrant
- CO = College Accelerator Programme entrant
- NG = Next Gen Accelerator Program entrant
- w/o = Walkover
- r = Retired
- d = Defaulted

=== Finals ===
Quarterfinals
1	(West Germany) Steffi Graf	6	6
14	(Soviet Union) Leila Meskhi	4	1
9	(Austria) Judith Wiesner	7	0	4
8	(Soviet Union) Natasha Zvereva	6	6	6
10	(France) Nathalie Tauziat	6	3
(Italy) Sandra Cecchini	7	6
6	(Spain) Conchita Martínez	0	3
2	(Socialist Federal Republic of Yugoslavia) Monica Seles	6	6

Semifinals
1	(West Germany) Steffi Graf	6	6
8	(Soviet Union) Natasha Zvereva	4	2
(Italy) Sandra Cecchini	1	3
2	(Socialist Federal Republic of Yugoslavia) Monica Seles	6	6

Final
1	(West Germany) Steffi Graf	4	3
2	(Socialist Federal Republic of Yugoslavia) Monica Seles	6	6

=== Top half ===
==== Section 1 ====
First round
Q	(Argentina) M Paz	6	3	7
(United Kingdom) S Loosemore	4	6	5
Q	(United Kingdom) S Smith	3	1
Q	(Italy) K Piccolini	6	6
Q	(Argentina) F Labat	4	7	6
12	(West Germany) I Cueto	6	6	1
14	(Soviet Union) L Meskhi	6	6
(South Africa) A Coetzer	0	0
(Czechoslovakia) R Rajchrtová	6	7
(United States) S Martin	4	5
(West Germany) W Probst	6	4	6
(Argentina) B Fulco	3	6	2

Second round
1	(West Germany) S Graf	6	6
Q	(Argentina) M Paz	1	2
Q	(Italy) K Piccolini	3	6	6
Q	(Argentina) F Labat	6	4	3
14	(Soviet Union) L Meskhi	6	6
(Czechoslovakia) R Rajchrtová	1	1
(West Germany) W Probst	1	0
5	(Bulgaria) K Maleeva	6	6

Third round
1	(West Germany) S Graf	6	6
Q	(Italy) K Piccolini	0	1
14	(Soviet Union) L Meskhi	4	6	6
5	(Bulgaria) K Maleeva	6	2	0

Quarterfinals
1	(West Germany) Steffi Graf	6	6
14	(Soviet Union) Leila Meskhi	4	1

==== Section 2 ====
First round
(West Germany) S Hanika	2	4
(West Germany) S Hack	6	6
LL	(United States) T Whitlinger	4	2
(Germany) A Huber	6	6
Q	(West Germany) V Martinek	2	4
9	(Austria) J Wiesner	6	6
15	(Sweden) C Lindqvist	7	6
Q	(West Germany) S Meier	6	0
(Australia) J Byrne	2	3
(Czechoslovakia) R Zrubáková	6	6
(France) I Demongeot	4	3
(United States) A Grossman	6	6

Second round
4	(United States) M Joe Fernández	6	6
(West Germany) S Hack	3	3
(Germany) A Huber	4	7	4
9	(Austria) J Wiesner	6	6	6
15	(Sweden) C Lindqvist	0	3
(Czechoslovakia) R Zrubáková	6	6
(United States) A Grossman	6	3	2
8	(Soviet Union) N Zvereva	4	6	6

Third round
4	(United States) M Joe Fernández	1^{r}
9	(Austria) J Wiesner	0
(Czechoslovakia) R Zrubáková	5	1
8	(Soviet Union) N Zvereva	7	6

Quarterfinals
9	(Austria) Judith Wiesner	7	0	4
8	(Soviet Union) Natasha Zvereva	6	6	6

=== Bottom half ===
==== Section 1 ====
First round
(Sweden) C Dahlman	6	6
(Australia) J Faull	4	1
(Australia) R McQuillan	0	1
(Australia) N Provis	6	6
(West Germany) M Kochta	6	4
10	(France) N Tauziat	7	6
(Italy) S Cecchini	6	7
Q	(Canada) R Simpson	4	6
(United States) L McNeil	6	6	3
LL	(Australia) J Tremelling	7	1	6
(United States) E Burgin	1	6	6
(South Africa) E Reinach	6	3	1

Second round
7	(Czechoslovakia) J Novotná	7	6
(Sweden) C Dahlman	5	4
(Australia) N Provis	4	7	4
10	(France) N Tauziat	6	6	6
(Italy) S Cecchini	3	6	7
LL	(Australia) J Tremelling	6	3	5
(United States) E Burgin	2	1
3	(Argentina) G Sabatini	6	6

Third round
7	(Czechoslovakia) J Novotná	6	5	5
10	(France) N Tauziat	2	7	7
(Italy) S Cecchini	6	3	6
3	(Argentina) G Sabatini	4	6	4

Quarterfinals
10	(France) Nathalie Tauziat	6	3
(Italy) Sandra Cecchini	7	6

==== Section 2 ====
First round
(United States) K Rinaldi	5	6
(Soviet Union) N Medvedeva	7	7
(West Germany) C Kohde-Kilsch	1	7	1
(Soviet Union) L Savchenko	6	6	6
(United States) S Stafford	4	3
16	(Australia) H Mandlíková	6	6
15	(Canada) H Kelesi	6	6
(Germany) K Duell	1	4
Q	(Bulgaria) M Maleeva	6	6
(Hungary) A Temesvári-Trunkos	2	1
(Argentina) P Tarabini	0^{r}
(Netherlands) N Jagerman	0

Second round
6	(Spain) C Martínez	6	6
(Soviet Union) N Medvedeva	4	3
(Soviet Union) L Savchenko	6	6
16	(Australia) H Mandlíková	3	0
15	(Canada) H Kelesi	3^{r}
Q	(Bulgaria) M Maleeva	6
(Netherlands) N Jagerman	1	0
2	(Socialist Federal Republic of Yugoslavia) M Seles	6	6

Third round
6	(Spain) C Martínez	6	6
(Soviet Union) L Savchenko	3	1
Q	(Bulgaria) M Maleeva	2	3
2	(Socialist Federal Republic of Yugoslavia) M Seles	6	6

Quarterfinals
6	(Spain) Conchita Martínez	0	3
2	(Socialist Federal Republic of Yugoslavia) Monica Seles	6	6
