= 1996 Fed Cup World Group =

Part of tennis tournament

- Date: 27 April – 29 September
- Edition: 6th

Champions
- United States
- Fed Cup

The World Group was the highest level of Fed Cup competition in 1996. Eight nations competed in a three-round knockout competition. Spain was the three-time defending champion, but they were defeated in the final by the finalist from the last two years, the United States, who captured their fifteenth title.

== Participating teams ==
Participating teams
Argentina	Austria	France	Germany
Japan	South Africa	Spain	United States

== Draw ==
Quarterfinals; 27–28 April
Murcia, Spain (Outdoor clay)
1	Spain	3
South Africa	2
Amiens, France (Outdoor clay)
Argentina	2
3	France	3
Tokyo, Japan (Indoor hard)
4	Germany	2
Japan	3
Salzburg, Austria (Outdoor clay)
Austria	2
2	United States	3

Semifinals; 13–14 July
Bayonne, France (Indoor carpet)
1	Spain	3
3	France	2
Nagoya, Japan (Indoor carpet)
Japan	0
2	United States	5

Final; 28–29 September
Atlantic City, New Jersey, United States (Indoor carpet)
1	Spain	0
2	United States	5

== First round ==
=== Spain vs. South Africa ===
Spain
3
Murcia Tennis Club, Murcia, Spain
27–28 April 1996
Red clay (outdoors)

South Africa
2

			1	2	3
1	(Spain) (South Africa)	Arantxa Sánchez Vicario; Joannette Kruger	6; 3	6; 1
2	(Spain) (South Africa)	Conchita Martínez; Amanda Coetzer	7; 5	6; 3
3	(Spain) (South Africa)	Arantxa Sánchez Vicario; Amanda Coetzer	4; 6	1; 6
4	(Spain) (South Africa)	Conchita Martínez; Mariaan de Swardt	6; 2	6; 3
5	(Spain) (South Africa)	Virginia Ruano Pascual / María Sánchez Lorenzo; Amanda Coetzer / Mariaan de Swardt	4; 6	6^{6} 7^{8}

=== Argentina vs. France ===
Argentina
2
Amiens Coliseum, Amiens, France
27–28 April 1996
Red clay (outdoors)

France
3

			1	2	3
1	(Argentina) (France)	Florencia Labat; Nathalie Tauziat	6; 3	6; 4
2	(Argentina) (France)	Paola Suárez; Julie Halard-Decugis	4; 6	6^{7} 7^{9}
3	(Argentina) (France)	Florencia Labat; Julie Halard-Decugis	4; 6	1; 6
4	(Argentina) (France)	Paola Suárez; Nathalie Tauziat	7^{7} 6^{5}	6; 1
5	(Argentina) (France)	Florencia Labat / Patricia Tarabini; Julie Halard-Decugis / Nathalie Tauziat	2; 6	4; 6

=== Germany vs. Japan ===
Germany
2
Ariake Coliseum, Tokyo, Japan
27–28 April 1996
DecoTurf (indoors)

Japan
3

			1	2	3
1	(Germany) (Japan)	Anke Huber; Kimiko Date	6; 4	4; 6	1; 6
2	(Germany) (Japan)	Steffi Graf; Naoko Sawamatsu	6; 1	6; 3
3	(Germany) (Japan)	Steffi Graf; Kimiko Date	6^{7} 7^{9}	6; 3	10; 12
4	(Germany) (Japan)	Anke Huber; Naoko Sawamatsu	6; 4	4; 6	6; 2
5	(Germany) (Japan)	Steffi Graf / Anke Huber; Kyōko Nagatsuka / Ai Sugiyama	6; 4	3; 6	3; 6

=== Austria vs. United States ===
Austria
2
Hellbrunn Stadium, Salzburg, Austria
27–28 April 1996
Red clay (outdoors)

United States
3

			1	2	3
1	(Austria) (United States)	Judith Wiesner; Mary Joe Fernández	3; 6	6^{5} 7^{7}
2	(Austria) (United States)	Barbara Paulus; Jennifer Capriati	6; 2	6; 4
3	(Austria) (United States)	Barbara Paulus; Mary Joe Fernández	3; 7	6^{4} 7^{7}
4	(Austria) (United States)	Judith Wiesner; Jennifer Capriati	6; 1	6; 1
5	(Austria) (United States)	Petra Schwarz / Judith Wiesner; Gigi Fernández / Mary Joe Fernández	0; 6	4; 6

== Semifinals ==
=== Spain vs. France ===
Spain
3
Lauga Hall, Bayonne, France
13–14 July 1996
Supreme carpet (indoors)

France
2

			1	2	3
1	(Spain) (France)	Conchita Martínez; Julie Halard-Decugis	1; 6	6; 4	6; 2
2	(Spain) (France)	Arantxa Sánchez Vicario; Mary Pierce	3; 6	4; 6
3	(Spain) (France)	Conchita Martínez; Mary Pierce	7; 5	6; 1
4	(Spain) (France)	Arantxa Sánchez Vicario; Julie Halard-Decugis	6; 2	4; 6	5; 7
5	(Spain) (France)	Conchita Martínez / Arantxa Sánchez Vicario; Julie Halard-Decugis / Nathalie Tauziat	6; 4	2; 1		retired

=== Japan vs. United States ===
Japan
0
Rainbow Hall, Nagoya, Japan
13–14 July 1996
Supreme carpet (indoors)

United States
5

			1	2	3
1	(Japan) (United States)	Kimiko Date; Lindsay Davenport	2; 6	1; 6
2	(Japan) (United States)	Ai Sugiyama; Monica Seles	2; 6	2; 6
3	(Japan) (United States)	Kimiko Date; Monica Seles	0; 6	2; 6
4	(Japan) (United States)	Ai Sugiyama; Lindsay Davenport	6^{8} 7^{10}	5; 7
5	(Japan) (United States)	Kyōko Nagatsuka / Ai Sugiyama; Lindsay Davenport / Linda Wild	2; 6	1; 6

== Final ==
=== Spain vs. United States ===
Spain
0
Boardwalk Hall, Atlantic City, New Jersey, United States
28–29 September 1996
Supreme carpet (indoors)

United States
5

			1	2	3
1	(Spain) (United States)	Conchita Martínez; Monica Seles	2; 6	4; 6
2	(Spain) (United States)	Arantxa Sánchez Vicario; Lindsay Davenport	5; 7	1; 6
3	(Spain) (United States)	Arantxa Sánchez Vicario; Monica Seles	6; 3	3; 6	1; 6
4	(Spain) (United States)	Gala León García; Lindsay Davenport	5; 7	2; 6
5	(Spain) (United States)	Gala León García / Virginia Ruano Pascual; Mary Joe Fernández / Linda Wild	1; 6	4; 6

1996 Fed Cup Champions
(United States)
United States
Fifteenth title

== See also ==
- Fed Cup structure
