= Grunting in tennis =

Loud vocalizations made by tennis players

Male players grunting during a doubles match at the 2018 Davis Cup

In tennis, grunting is a nonverbal vocalization made by some players of the sport, usually when hitting the ball. It has been a source of controversy within the sport; some players of professional tennis have stated that it is a form of cheating when deliberate, whereas others defend grunting as a way to expel energy.

Grunting by males in professional tennis matches has taken place since at least the 1970s, with Jimmy Connors doing so at the 1974 Wimbledon Championships, followed by Andre Agassi in the 1980s. Monica Seles was one of the first professional female players to grunt during her matches, particularly at Wimbledon 1992. Players Michelle Larcher de Brito and Maria Sharapova were known for grunting loudly during their matches, leading to accusations in 2009—particularly from former player Martina Navratilova—that their grunting was being deliberately used to distract opponents.

Examples of other contemporary female tennis players who grunt are Victoria Azarenka, Aryna Sabalenka, Anna Kournikova, and Serena and Venus Williams. Other male players who do so include Rafael Nadal, Gustavo Kuerten, Andrey Rublev, and Carlos Alcaraz. Some players such as Novak Djokovic have reduced their grunting habits as their career has progressed. Of the top 30 professional tennis players of each sex in 2017, 90% of male players and 76% of female players produced tennis grunts during matches.

== History ==
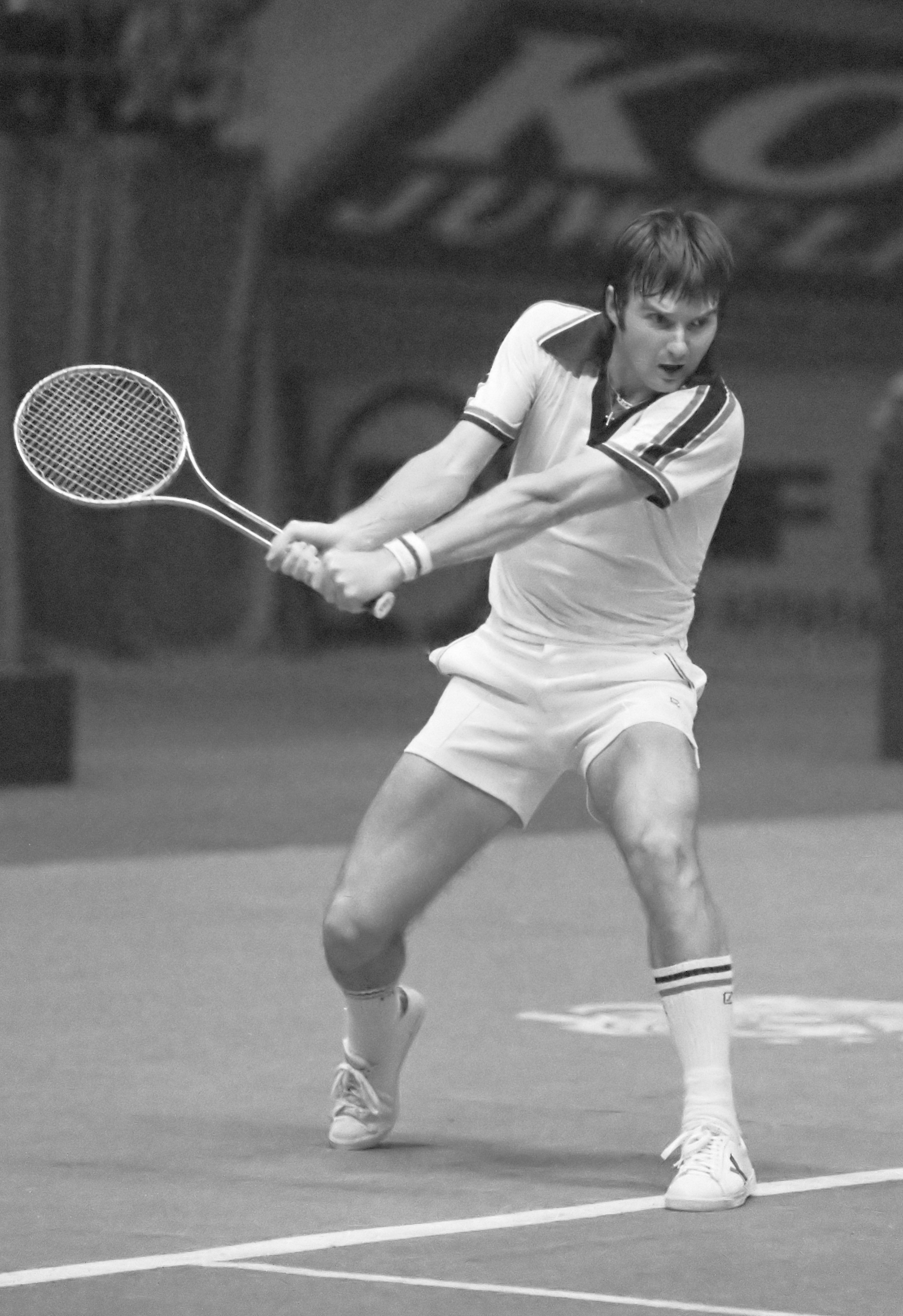
Jimmy Connors was known to grunt loudly during his matches from the 1970s.

Jimmy Connors was known for his loud grunting during tennis games in the 1970s; he won his first Wimbledon title in 1974. In the 1988 US Open, Ivan Lendl complained about Andre Agassi's grunting.

Monica Seles was one of the first professional female players to be noted for her grunting during tennis games. Martina Navratilova complained of Seles's grunting at the 1992 Wimbledon Championships. Seles was quieter in the final, causing some speculation that her loss to Steffi Graf was a result of this change. In 2001, Jennifer Capriati lost 6–3, 6–3 to Seles in the Acura Classic quarterfinals; she blamed Seles's grunting for the loss, stating that it was "like interference".

=== 2009 French Open controversy ===
Michelle Larcher de Brito's grunts were notable for being particularly loud in the 2009 French Open, eliciting laughs among the crowd, and becoming popular on video sharing site YouTube. Aravane Rezaï, who grunted herself during rallies, complained to the umpire about de Brito's grunts at the competition, saying that "It's very disturbing, it's disturbing me." De Brito was booed off the court at the end of the match. Her grunts had a reported decibel reading of 109. She later said that "if people don't like my grunting, they can always leave", and that she would "rather get fined than lose a match because I had to stop grunting". Similarly, Maria Sharapova was recorded as grunting at 101 decibels in 2009. Sharapova stated; "I've done this ever since I started playing tennis and I'm not going to change".

That year, Navratilova said that grunting was a form of cheating: "The grunting has reached an unacceptable level. It is cheating, pure and simple. It is time for something to be done". Navratilova said that grunting drowned out the sound of the ball leaving the grunter's racquet, thereby preventing an opponent from using that clue as to force and spin to address their reception of the ball and the return stroke. She cited Roger Federer as an example of a successful player who did not grunt. Another former player, Chris Evert, stopped short of labelling it cheating but said she thought "the grunts are getting louder and more shrill now with the current players".

Some players and commentators noted during this controversy that grunting was associated with Bollettieri Tennis Academy and its professional tennis coach Nick Bollettieri, who had personally trained the majority of grunting players including de Brito, Seles, Sharapova, Agassi, and the Williams sisters. Bollettieri denied accusations that this was a distraction tactic and stated that grunting was natural, preferring to use the word "exhaling". He said; "I think that if you look at other sports, weightlifting or doing squats or a golfer when he executes the shot or a hockey player, the exhaling is a release of energy in a constructive way". De Brito stated that her grunting was not taught at the Academy and that she had been doing it since she began playing tennis.

As of 2009, the International Tennis Federation did not mention grunting nor noise obstruction in its rules and there were no plans to amend them. At the 2009 Wimbledon Championships, English bookmaker William Hill saw significant interest in tennis betting on disqualifications, penalizations and complaints concerning grunting.

=== Later history ===
At Wimbledon 2015, Victoria Azarenka faced post-match questions about her grunting. She responded that she was "tired of these questions," and that "it's annoying as guys grunt. I was practicing next to [Rafael] Nadal, and he grunts louder than me and nobody noticed it. Look at the good stuff."

During a 2023 Wimbledon semifinal between Novak Djokovic and Jannik Sinner, Djokovic was penalized a point by the chair umpire for a long grunt he had made after hitting a backhand down the line. At the 2023 French Open, Stefanos Tsitsipas complained to the umpire of an "extended grunt" from Carlos Alcaraz that took place during a pivotal second-set tiebreak, stating that it had extended into the period in which Tsitsipas was about to hit his shot. In 2024, Serena Williams stated that her grunt was based upon that of Monica Seles, stating that "I literally would grunt because of her, and then it just became natural".

== Analysis ==
A 2017 study in Animal Behaviour of the top 30 tennis players in the world of each sex found that 90% of male players and 76% of female players produced tennis grunts during matches. Results showed that the pitch of a player's grunt does not significantly indicate a player's age, height or weight, but does usually indicate their sex, with very little overlap. It also found that grunt pitch increases as tennis matches progress, is higher when serving than when performing a groundstroke, and is also higher when a player loses a match than when they win. The study found that listeners could accurately predict player sex and match outcomes based on the changing pitches of the players' grunts.

=== Reasons for grunting ===
==== Scientific study ====
Grunting benefits the performance of players who do so. A 2014 study on 32 collegiate tennis athletes found that the velocity, force and peak muscle activity of both serves and forehand strokes were significantly greater when the subjects grunted than when they did not. Another study the same year found that grunting can increase the velocity of tennis balls when hit by 3.8%, and that it does not increase the oxygen cost of hitting the ball. A 2025 systematic review of these two studies recommended that coaches integrate the development of grunting into their training: "it is important for coaches to incorporate the grunt as part of the technical aspects of groundstroke phases or impact points. Analytical on-court drills requiring players to grunt can be included in training sessions to internalize this technique, along with competitive exercises that mandate a minimum number of grunts per point. This approach familiarizes players with grunting, enabling them to effectively utilize it during matches."

Grunting also appears to affect the prediction of the ball's trajectory by opponents. A study published in 2019 on how and whether grunts affect opponents' anticipation in tennis showed temporally occluded video clips of tennis rallies with varied grunting sounds to tennis players. It found that higher grunt intensities caused the players watching to predict longer ball trajectories, though radial prediction errors were not affected. This conclusion opposed the hypothesis that grunting in tennis distracts players, instead supporting the hypothesis that grunting systematically influences players' judgments of a ball's trajectory. A further study in 2023 replicated these results.

==== Other theories ====
Louise Deeley, a sports psychologist at Roehampton University, stated in 2005 that grunting is part of rhythm for tennis players: "The timing of when they actually grunt helps them with the rhythm of how they're hitting and how they're pacing things". She stated that banning grunting is not the solution: "They may feel, on the surface, that this is going to be a distraction to their game, that it is part and parcel of what they do". Tennis coach and commentator Patrick Mouratoglou has stated that grunting is used as "a way to breathe well while you play". Coach Nikola Aracic has stated that it is a way to prevent the natural though unbeneficial tendency for players to hold their breath in crucial moments, and has described it as "intuitive".

Bruce Lynne, a physiologist at University College London, commented in 2005 that reflexes may have an effect: "If you're looking at reflexes in the legs and you ask someone to clench their jaw, then believe it or not, the reflexes in their legs get brisker, that's a well-known problem called re-enforcement".

The ability for grunting to throw off opponents is also perceived as a benefit; Navratilova has stated that it can mask the sound of the ball coming off the racquet. Mouratoglou has stated that it signals to opponents that the ball will be hit hard, putting pressure on that opponent.

== Press and media coverage ==
The tabloid press has frequently given nicknames to female players who grunt; in 1992, Monica Seles was dubbed "Moan-ica", Sharapova has been nicknamed "Shriek-opova", and in 2009 tabloids labeled de Brito "the tennis banshee". The press particularly wrote of the grunting of primarily female players during the 2005 Wimbledon Championships, and NBC presented an item on grunting prior to the match between Williams and Sharapova which included a suggestion that it should be banned from the sport. In 2005 on The Jonathan Ross Show, Serena Williams's grunts were played back to her as a sexual joke. At the 2012 Australian Open, in which Sharapova faced Azarenka in the final, a headline in The Guardian called it a "scream queen" final.

This form of reporting, particularly on female players, has been criticised by academics for "evoking derogatory, trivializing narratives." Some sociologists such as Laura Hills and Eileen Kennedy have noted that, given that "acceptance into Wimbledon is partially predicated on learning and displaying the 'soft things,' (certain dress, speech, and interaction styles)", grunting by female players appears to flout these rules and position players who grunt as "space invaders" in terms of their nation, gender, and class, and thus invokes this form of media coverage. John Vincent and Jane Crossman noted that while Maria Sharapova's "screaming" was trivialized in newspapers, her presentation as a white woman with emphasised femininity marked her as a "relative insider". They compared this to Serena Williams, "whose unnatural athleticism, muscularity, and innate confidence were used to position her as the 'other,' in the newspapers' narratives".

=== "Grunt-o-meter" ===
In 1992, upon Monica Seles's first appearance at the All England Club, British newspapers began to measure the decibels of players' grunts and publish the results on a "grunt-o-meter". Seles' grunts were measured at 93 decibels in 1992. Maria Sharapova hit a record of 101.2 decibels in 2005, and Serena and Venus Williams's grunts were measured at 88.9 and 85 decibels respectively as of 2009. Use of the "grunt-o-meter" in press coverage saw a resurgence in 2009 following de Brito's French Open controversy.

== See also ==
- Jigen-ryū, a Japanese school of martial arts known for using loud vocalizations to unnerve opponents
