= 1990 Eckerd Tennis Open =

1990 Eckerd Open
- Date: April 16–22
- Edition: 18th
- Category: Tier III
- Draw: 32S / 16D
- Prize money: $225,000
- Surface: Clay / outdoor
- Location: Tampa, Florida, U.S.
- Venue: Bardmoor Country Club

Champions

Singles
- (Socialist Federal Republic of Yugoslavia) Monica Seles

Doubles
- (Argentina) Mercedes Paz (Spain) Arantxa Sánchez Vicario
- Eckerd Open

The 1990 Eckerd Open was a women's tennis tournament played on outdoor clay courts at the Bardmoor Country Club in Tampa, Florida in the United States that was part of the Tier III category of the 1990 WTA Tour. It was the 18th and last edition of the tournament and was held from April 16 through April 22, 1990. First-seeded Monica Seles won the singles title and earned $45,000 first-prize money.

== Finals ==
=== Singles ===
(Socialist Federal Republic of Yugoslavia) Monica Seles defeated (Bulgaria) Katerina Maleeva 6–1, 6–0

- It was Seles' 3rd title of the year and the 4th of her career.

=== Doubles ===
(Argentina) Mercedes Paz / (Spain) Arantxa Sánchez Vicario defeated (Italy) Sandra Cecchini / (Peru) Laura Gildemeister 6–2, 6–0
