= Monica Seles =

Yugoslav–American tennis player (b. 1973)

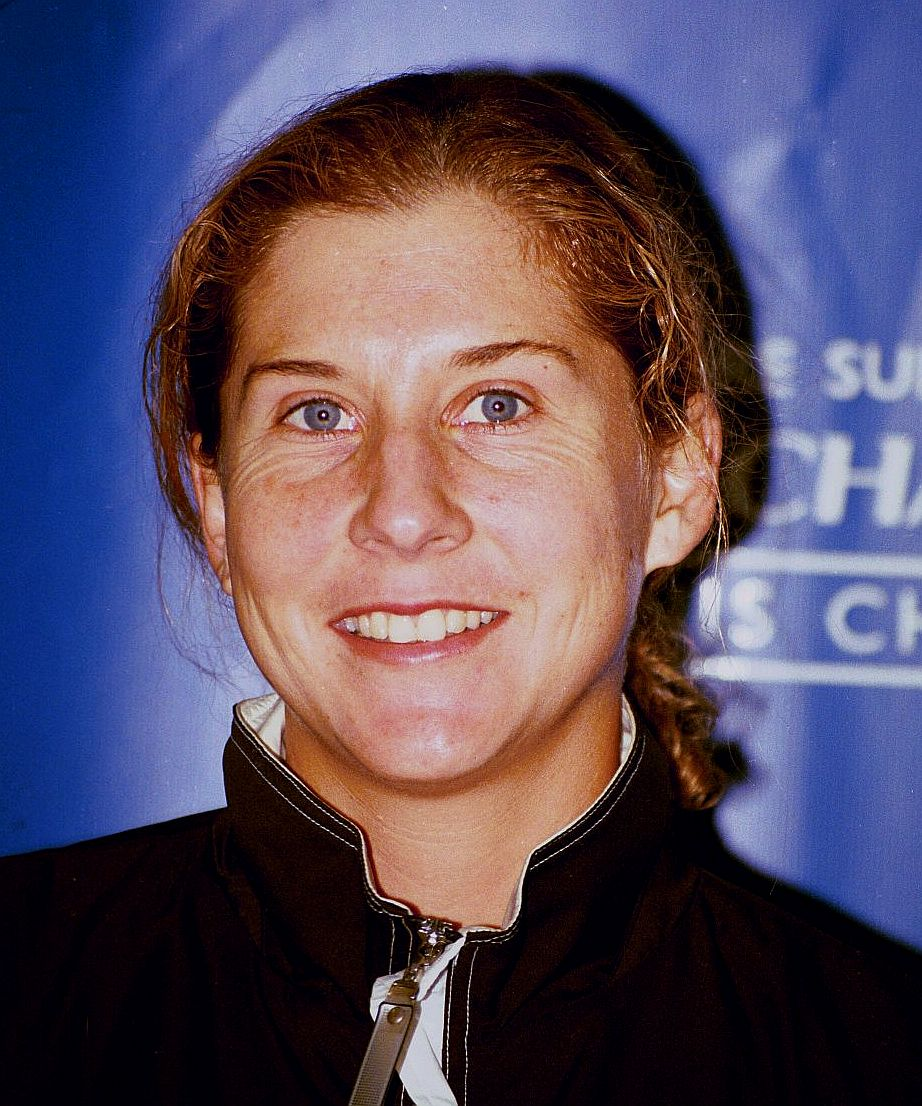
- Seles in 1999
- Country (sports): Yugoslavia (1988–1992); FR Yugoslavia (1992–1994); United States (1994–2008)
- Residence: Sarasota, Florida, United States
- Born: December 2, 1973 (age 52) Novi Sad, SR Serbia, SFR Yugoslavia
- Height: 5 ft 10 in (1.78 m)
- Turned pro: 1989
- Retired: 2008 (last match in 2003)
- Plays: Left-handed (two-handed both sides)
- Prize money: US$14,891,762: 44th in all-time rankings
- Int. Tennis HoF: 2009 (member page)

Singles
- Career record: 595–122 (82.99%)
- Career titles: 53
- Highest ranking: No. 1 (March 11, 1991)

Grand Slam singles results
- Australian Open: W (1991, 1992, 1993, 1996)
- French Open: W (1990, 1991, 1992)
- Wimbledon: F (1992)
- US Open: W (1991, 1992)

Other tournaments
- Tour Finals: W (1990, 1991, 1992)
- Olympic Games: Bronze (2000)

Doubles
- Career record: 89–45
- Career titles: 6
- Highest ranking: No. 16 (April 22, 1991)

Grand Slam doubles results
- Australian Open: SF (1991, 2001)
- French Open: 3R (1990)
- Wimbledon: QF (1999)
- US Open: QF (1999)

Team competitions
- Fed Cup: United States; W (1996, 1999, 2000)
- Hopman Cup: Yugoslavia W (1991); United States F (2001, 2002)

Medal record
Women's tennis
Representing United States
Olympic Games
Bronze medal – third place	2000 Sydney	Singles

Monica Seles (Note: /ˈsɛləs/; Hungarian: Szeles Mónika, pronounced [ˈsɛlɛʃ ˈmoːnikɒ]; Serbian: Моника Селеш, romanized: Monika Seleš) (born December 2, 1973) is a former professional tennis player who represented Yugoslavia and the United States. She was ranked as the world No. 1 in women's singles by the WTA for 178 weeks (sixth-most of all time), and finished as the year-end No. 1 three times. Seles won 53 career singles titles, including nine majors: eight as a teenager while representing Yugoslavia and the final one while representing the United States.

A teen phenomenon, Seles became the youngest-ever French Open champion in 1990 at 16. She went on to dominate the tour in 1991 and 1992, compiling a total of eight major championships while still a teenager. However, on April 30, 1993, Seles was the victim of an on-court attack when an obsessed fan of Seles' rival Steffi Graf stabbed Seles in the back with a knife as she was sitting down between games. Seles did not play professional tennis for over two years following the stabbing, struggling with depression and an eating disorder. After returning in 1995, Seles claimed a ninth major championship at the 1996 Australian Open, but was unable to consistently produce her best tennis. She played her last professional match at the 2003 French Open.

Seles was named one of the "30 Legends of Women's Tennis: Past, Present and Future" by Time. She was named the Yugoslav Sportswoman of the Year in 1985 and 1990, and the BTA Best Balkan Athlete of the Year in 1990 and 1991. Several players and historians have argued that Seles had the potential to become the most accomplished female player of all time had she not been stabbed. She was inducted into the International Tennis Hall of Fame in 2009.

== Early life and career ==
Seles was born in Novi Sad, SR Serbia, Yugoslavia (modern-day Serbia), to an ethnic Hungarian family. Her parents are Ester and Karolj (Eszter and Károly in Hungarian) and she has an older brother, Zoltan (Zoltán in Hungarian). She began playing tennis at age five, coached by her father, a professional cartoonist employed for decades at the Dnevnik and Magyar Szó newspapers, who drew pictures for her to make her tennis more fun. He is responsible for developing her two-handed style for both the forehand and backhand. Later, her coach was Jelena Genčić. In 1985, at age 11, she won the Junior Orange Bowl tournament in Miami, Florida, which caught the attention of tennis coach Nick Bollettieri. In early 1986, Seles and her brother Zoltan moved from Yugoslavia to the United States, and Seles enrolled at the Nick Bollettieri Tennis Academy, where she trained for two years and continued to practice until March 1990. Nine months after their arrival at the academy, Seles' mother and father joined her and Zoltan in Florida.

Seles played her first professional tournament as an amateur in 1988 at age 14. The following year, she turned professional on February 13, 1989, and joined the professional tour full-time, winning her first career title at Houston in May 1989, where she beat the soon-to-retire Chris Evert in the final. A month later, Seles reached the semifinals of her first Grand Slam singles tournament at the French Open, losing to then-world No. 1 Graf. Seles finished her first year on the tour ranked world No. 6.

== Tennis career ==
=== 1990–1992 ===
After a slow start at the beginning of the season, Seles went on a 36-match winning streak and won 6 consecutive tournaments starting in Miami at the Lipton Player's Championships. During that winning streak she also won the U.S. Hard Court Championships, the Eckerd Open, the Italian Open, and the Lufthansa Cup in Berlin, Germany, defeating Steffi Graf in the final in straight sets. Seles then won her first Grand Slam singles title at the 1990 French Open. Facing world No. 1 Graf in the final, Seles saved four set points in a first-set tiebreaker, which she won 8–6, and went on to take the match in straight sets. In doing so, she became the youngest-ever French Open singles Champion at the age of 16 years, 6 months. Her winning streak was stopped by Zina Garrison at Wimbledon in the quarterfinals, where Seles had a match point before Garrison eventually won 9–7 in the third set. Seles then won the Virginia Slims of Los Angeles title against Martina Navratilova and then defeated Navratilova again in winning the Oakland California tournament, in straight sets. She also won the 1990 year-end Virginia Slims Championships, defeating Gabriela Sabatini in five sets (in the first five-set women's match since the 1901 US National Championships), becoming the youngest to ever win the season-ending championships. She finished the year ranked world number 2.

Seles dominated the women's tour in 1991 and 1992. In 1991, she won the Australian Open in January, beating Jana Novotná in the final. In March, Seles replaced Graf as the world's top player. She successfully defended her French Open title, beating Arantxa Sánchez Vicario in the final. Suffering from shin splints, Seles was unable to play at Wimbledon and took a six-week break. She was back for the US Open, defeating Martina Navratilova in the final, her third Grand Slam title of the year. Seles won the year-end Virginia Slims Championships for the second consecutive time, defeating Navratilova in four sets. At the end of season, Seles had won 10 out of the 16 tournaments she entered, reaching the final of every tournament that she entered that year. She ended the year as the world's number one player.

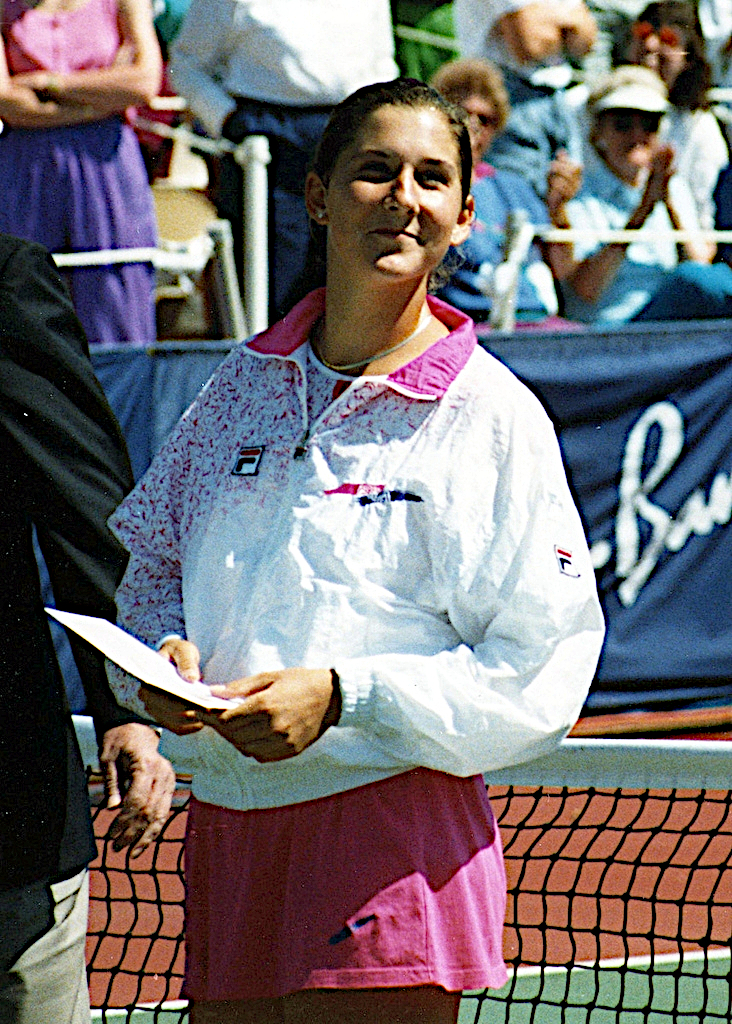
Seles at the 1991 U.S. Women's Hard Court Championships in San Antonio

Seles was equally dominant in 1992, defended her titles at the Australian Open, the French Open, and the US Open. She also reached her first-ever final at Wimbledon, but lost to Graf. At Wimbledon, opponents criticized the vocalizations Seles made during play. Her quarterfinal opponent Nathalie Tauziat was the first to complain to the chair umpire. Navratilova complained to the chair umpire during the third set of her semi-final match after Seles went up a break at 4–2. Seles ended up losing the game and the break, but broke back and closed out the match.

From January 1991 through February 1993, Seles won 22 titles and reached 33 finals in 34 tournaments. She compiled a 159–12 win–loss record (92.9% winning percentage), including a 55–1 win–loss record (98%) in Grand Slam tournaments. In the broader context of her first four years on the circuit (1989–1992), Seles had a win–loss record of 231–25 (90.2%) and collected 30 titles. She once again ended the year as the number one ranked player in the world.

=== 1993 stabbing attack ===
Seles was the top-ranked women's player heading into 1993, having won the French Open for three consecutive years and both the US Open and Australian Open in consecutive years. In January 1993, Seles defeated Graf in the final of the Australian Open, which, at that time, was her third win in four Grand Slam tournament finals against Graf. She then won the Virginia Slims of Chicago over Martina Navratilova in three sets.

On April 30, 1993, during a quarterfinal match against Magdalena Maleeva at the Citizen Cup in Hamburg, Germany, a German man named Günter Parche (1954–2022), an obsessed fan of Seles's rival Graf, ran from the middle of the crowd to the edge of the court during a break between games and stabbed Seles with a boning knife between her shoulder blades, to a depth of 0.5 in (1.3 cm). She was quickly taken to a hospital. Her physical injuries took several weeks to heal, but she stayed away from competitive tennis for more than two years. Initially, there was speculation that the attack might have been politically motivated because Seles was from Yugoslavia. She was known to have received death threats in relation to the Yugoslav Wars. However, German authorities were quick to rule this out, describing her attacker as confused and possibly mentally disturbed. According to police, Parche intended to severely injure Seles so that she would be unable to play tennis and Graf would become the world top player again.

Parche was charged following the incident, but spent less than six months in pre-trial detention. In his trial, he was found to be psychologically abnormal and was sentenced to two years' probation and psychological treatment. The incident prompted a significant increase in security at tennis tour events. At that year's Wimbledon, the players' seats were positioned with their backs to the umpire's chair, rather than the spectators. Seles, however, disputed the effectiveness of these measures. She was quoted in 2011 as saying, "From the time I was stabbed, I think the security hasn't changed". Disenchanted by the German legal system, Seles vowed never to play tennis in Germany again, saying: "What people seem to be forgetting is that this man stabbed me intentionally, and he did not serve any sort of punishment for it ... I would not feel comfortable going back. I don't foresee that happening." In a later article, Tennis reported that Parche was living in nursing homes due to additional health problems. He died in a nursing home in August 2022 at the age of 68.

Graf visited Seles while she was hospitalized. Young Elders, a band from Melbourne, sent their song called "Fly Monica Fly" to Seles while she was recuperating from the stabbing incident. She later said that the song inspired her at the time and that she subsequently met the band (later known as the Monicas) following her victory at the Australian Open in 1996. The stabbing incident is the subject of Dan Bern's 1998 tribute to Seles, "Monica". Additionally, American band Majesty Crush paid tribute with "Seles" from the 1993 album Love-15.

The WTA suggested that Seles's No. 1 ranking be maintained during her absence following the stabbing, but the ranking was ultimately not preserved. A vote was held at a tournament in Rome in 1993, and 16 of the 17 top players who voted rejected the proposal – Graf did not participate in the tournament and was thus absent from voting. Of those who did vote, only Gabriela Sabatini, who abstained, did not reject the idea of freezing Seles's ranking until her return. Seles did not play tennis for two years, suffering depression and an eating disorder as a result of the attack.

=== Comeback ===
After becoming a U.S. citizen in 1994, Seles returned to the tour in August 1995. In the run-up to her comeback, the WTA president Martina Navratilova proposed that Seles be reinstated alongside Graf as joint number one. The WTA did so despite some opposition from players including Arantxa Sánchez Vicario and Gigi Fernández, whose tournament placements would suffer greatly by suddenly being placed behind Seles. Graf supported Seles' co-ranking, but not the additional proposal that Seles' co-ranking not be determined by the minimum participation of 12 tournaments a year required of everyone else. Graf felt that would give Seles an unfair advantage in the rankings. Seles won her first comeback tournament, the Canadian Open, beating Amanda Coetzer in the final and setting a tournament record for the fewest games dropped by the champion throughout the tournament (14). The following month at the US Open, Seles reached the final, defeating world No. 10 Anke Huber, No. 4 Jana Novotná, and No. 3 Conchita Martínez (all in straight sets), but lost to Graf in the final.

In January 1996, Seles won her fourth Australian Open title, defeating Anke Huber in the final. Her pivotal match was the semi-final versus rising American star Chanda Rubin, who led her 5–2 in the final set, and had two break points to lead 5–1. Seles came back from two points from defeat to triumph and reach the final. This was to be Seles's last Grand Slam title, as she struggled to recapture her best form on a consistent basis. Seles was the runner-up to Graf again at the US Open in 1996. Seles' last Grand Slam final came at the French Open in 1998, just a few weeks after the death of her father and former coach, Karolj, from cancer. In the run to the final, she had defeated world No. 3 Jana Novotná in three sets and world No. 1 Martina Hingis in straight sets, but lost to Sánchez Vicario in the three-set final.

While she did not reach another major singles final, she did consistently reach the quarterfinal and semifinal stages in those tournaments and was a fixture in the WTA Tour's top 10. In 2002, her last full year on the tour, she finished the year ranked world No. 7, defeated Venus Williams, Martina Hingis, Jennifer Capriati, Justine Henin, Maria Sharapova, Kim Clijsters, and Lindsay Davenport, and reached at least the quarter-finals at each Grand Slam tournament.

Seles competed at the 1996 Olympic Games in Atlanta, where she beat Sabatini in a third round match before losing to Jana Novotná in the quarter-finals. Four years later, at the 2000 Olympic Games in Sydney, Seles won her first Olympic medal, a bronze in singles. She defeated Jelena Dokic in the bronze medal match, after pushing eventual gold medalist Venus Williams to a tough three-setter in the semis, losing 6–3 in the final set. Seles helped the U.S. team win the Fed Cup in 1996, 1999, and 2000.

=== Hiatus and retirement ===
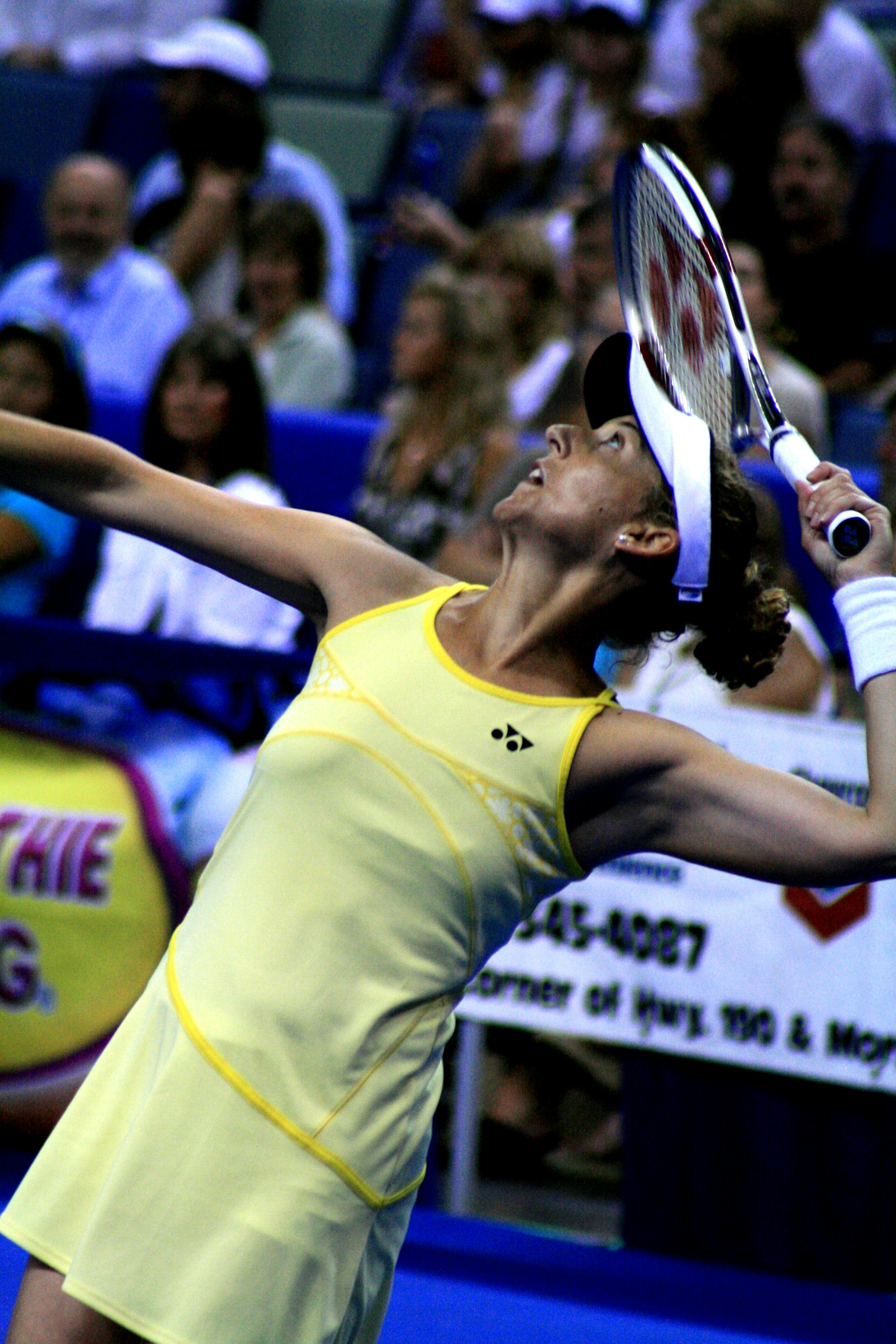
Seles in the 2007 exhibition against Martina Navratilova in New Orleans

In the spring of 2003, Seles sustained a foot injury. She was forced to withdraw during the second set of a match against Nadia Petrova at the Italian Open. Then, a couple of weeks later and still injured, she lost in straight sets to the same player in the first round of the 2003 French Open. It was the only time she ever lost a first-round match at a Grand Slam. She never again played an official tour match.

In February 2005, Seles played two exhibition matches in New Zealand against Navratilova. Despite losing both matches, she played competitively and announced she could return to the game early in 2006; however, she did not. She played three exhibition matches against Navratilova in 2007. On April 5, she defeated Navratilova in Houston, Texas, on clay. On September 14, Seles defeated Navratilova on an indoor court in New Orleans. On September 16, she beat her on clay in Bucharest.

In December 2007, Seles told the press that Lindsay Davenport's successful return to the tour had inspired her to consider her own limited comeback to play Grand Slam tournaments and the major warm-up events for those tournaments. However, on February 14, 2008, Seles announced her official retirement from professional tennis. In January 2009, Seles was elected to the International Tennis Hall of Fame.

=== Statistics ===
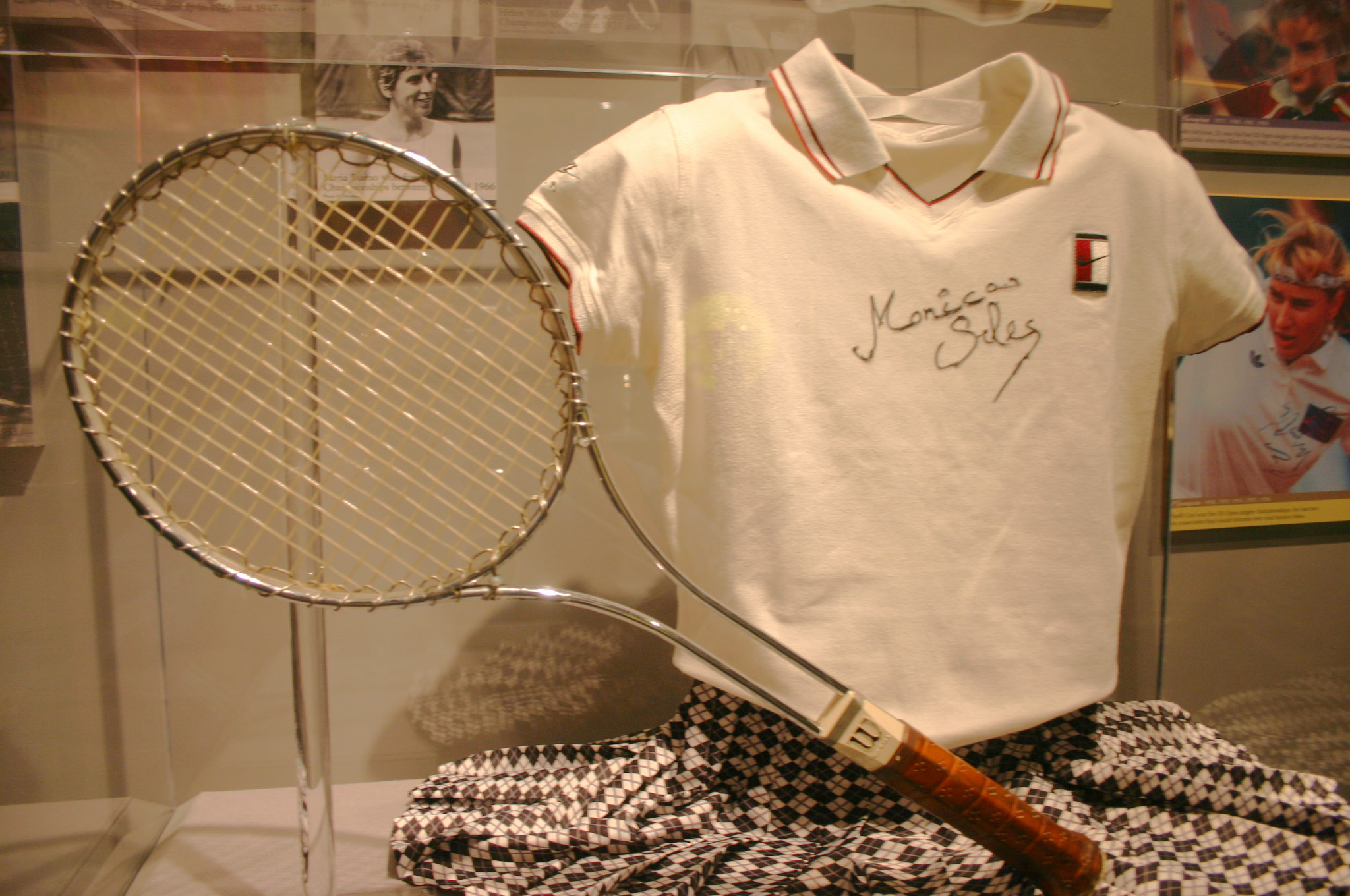
Seles' outfit at the Tennis Hall of Fame Museum at the Newport Casino

Seles is widely regarded as one of the greatest tennis players of all time. In 2012, Tennis Channel created a list of the 100 greatest tennis players. Seles was listed at #19.

Seles won eight major titles during her teenage years. However, her career was greatly affected by the stabbing incident. Some involved with the sport have declared that Seles could have become the most accomplished female player ever. In an article written 20 years after Seles was stabbed, Jonathan Scott of Tennis.com stated, "Would Monica Seles have been the greatest female tennis player ever? The world will never know." In a 2013 interview, Martina Navratilova theorized that if Seles had not been stabbed, "We'd be talking about Monica with the most Grand Slam titles [ahead of] Margaret Court or Steffi Graf." Mary Joe Fernández declared that Seles would have at least doubled her Grand Slam championship tally, had she not been attacked. Tim Adams of The Guardian stated that Seles would have become "the greatest female tennis player ever to pick up a racket."

During the height of her career (the 1990 French Open through the 1993 Australian Open), she won eight of the 11 Grand Slam singles tournaments she contested. With eight Grand Slam singles titles before her 20th birthday, Seles holds the record for most Grand Slam singles titles won as a teenager in the Open Era.

Until her loss to Martina Hingis at the 1999 Australian Open, Seles had a perfect record at the event (33–0), which is the longest undefeated streak for this tournament (although Margaret Court won 38 consecutive matches there from 1960 to 1968 after losing a match in 1959). It also marked her first defeat in Australia, having won the Sydney tournament in 1996.

Seles was the first female tennis player to win her first six Grand Slam singles finals: 1990 French Open, 1991 Australian Open, 1991 French Open, 1991 US Open, 1992 Australian Open, and 1992 French Open. Seles was also the first female player since Hilde Krahwinkel Sperling in 1937 to win the women's singles title three consecutive years at the French Open, a feat subsequently achieved by Justine Henin in 2005–7. (Also, Chris Evert won the title in four consecutive appearances in 1974, 1975, 1979, and 1980).

Shortly after her retirement, Sports Illustrated writer Jon Wertheim stated:

Yet, transformed from champion to tragedienne, Seles became far more popular than she was while winning all those titles. It became impossible to root against her. At first, out of sympathy. Then, because she revealed herself to be so thoroughly thoughtful, graceful, and dignified. When she quietly announced her retirement last week at age 34, she exited as perhaps the most adored figure in the sport's history. As happy endings go, one could do worse.

She was inducted into the International Tennis Hall of Fame on July 11, 2009. In 2011, Seles was named one of the "30 Legends of Women's Tennis: Past, Present and Future" by Time.

== Playing style ==
Seles was a baseline player who was known for her power-based, highly aggressive playing style. Her unconventional double-handed forehand and backhand were both hit flat, with relentless speed, power, and depth. As a result of her two-handed groundstrokes, she could create sharp angles around the court, and hit winners at will. She was an aggressive return player and would stand within the baseline to return serves. Further strengths included her fitness, speed, and court coverage, allowing her to be an excellent retriever, and hit winners from any position on the court. Prior to her stabbing, Seles' greatest strengths were her powerful groundstrokes and mental toughness, with her being described as one of the toughest players to beat on the WTA tour. Seles was also known for accompanying her shots with loud grunting, and was frequently criticized for doing so. Due to her aggressive power game, she is considered one of the inspirations for modern WTA players such as Serena and Venus Williams, Maria Sharapova, and Victoria Azarenka.

In the book Facing Monica Seles, Chris Evert is quoted saying Seles "changed the whole complexion of tennis, brought another level to the game. She was a game changer."

== Coaches, equipment, and endorsements ==
Seles had many coaches through the years. These included: Karoly Seleš (1979–1996), Jelena Genčić (1980–1986), Nick Bollettieri (1986–1990), Sven Groeneveld (1991–1992), Gavin Hopper (1997–1998), Bobby Banck (1999–2001), Mike Sell (2001–2002), and David Nainkin (2003).

In the early 1990s, Seles signed a $4-million endorsement contract with Fila to promote its footwear and tennis apparel. She used a Prince original graphite racquet on court. In August of the 1990 season, Seles switched to a Yonex racquet.

When she returned to the tour in 1995 after the stabbing, Seles wore apparel by Nike and used a Yonex racquet on court.

In the 2000s, Seles wore Yonex apparel and used a Yonex SRQ Ti-800 Pro Long racquet on court.

== Personal life ==
Seles was born and raised in Novi Sad, Yugoslavia (now Serbia) to an ethnic Hungarian family. She became a naturalized American citizen in 1994, and she received Hungarian citizenship in June 2007. She received honorary citizenship of Novi Sad in 1993.

On April 21, 2009, Seles released her memoir Getting A Grip: On My Body, My Mind, My Self, which chronicles her bout with depression and binge eating disorder (BED) after her stabbing, her father's cancer diagnosis and eventual death, her journey back to the game, and a life beyond tennis.

Seles is married to businessman Tom Golisano. They began dating in 2009. The two announced their engagement on June 5, 2014.

As of 2015, Seles was a paid spokesperson for Shire, the makers of the first drug approved by the Food and Drug Administration to treat binge eating disorder, to raise awareness of the disorder she has suffered from since she was a young adult. Seles would eat normal amounts of food at meals, and then secretly eat large amounts of junk food when she was alone.

Seles was diagnosed with myasthenia gravis in 2022, and spoke publicly about her battle with the disease in August 2025. In 2026, Seles appeared in TV commercials for a medical treatment for gMG.

== In popular culture ==
In 1993, Seinfeld featured an episode ("The Lip Reader") in which the creators fictionalized Seles's return to the US Open after her stabbing. In 1996, Seles made a guest appearance in the TV sitcom The Nanny. She also appeared on the TV series Dancing with the Stars in 2008 as one of the contestants.

== Career statistics ==
=== Grand Slam tournament finals ===
==== Singles: 13 (9 titles, 4 runner-ups) ====
Result	Year	Championship	Surface	Opponent	Score
Win	1990	French Open	Clay	(Germany) Steffi Graf	7–6^{(8–6)}, 6–4
Win	1991	Australian Open	Hard	(Czechoslovakia) Jana Novotná	5–7, 6–3, 6–1
Win	1991	French Open (2)	Clay	(Spain) Arantxa Sánchez Vicario	6–3, 6–4
Win	1991	US Open	Hard	(United States) Martina Navratilova	7–6^{(7–1)}, 6–1
Win	1992	Australian Open (2)	Hard	(United States) Mary Joe Fernández	6–2, 6–3
Win	1992	French Open (3)	Clay	(Germany) Steffi Graf	6–2, 3–6, 10–8
Loss	1992	Wimbledon	Grass	(Germany) Steffi Graf	2–6, 1–6
Win	1992	US Open (2)	Hard	(Spain) Arantxa Sánchez Vicario	6–3, 6–3
Win	1993	Australian Open (3)	Hard	(Germany) Steffi Graf	4–6, 6–3, 6–2
Loss	1995	US Open	Hard	(Germany) Steffi Graf	6–7^{(6–8)}, 6–0, 3–6
Win	1996	Australian Open (4)	Hard	(Germany) Anke Huber	6–4, 6–1
Loss	1996	US Open	Hard	(Germany) Steffi Graf	5–7, 4–6
Loss	1998	French Open	Clay	(Spain) Arantxa Sánchez Vicario	6–7^{(5–7)}, 6–0, 2–6

=== Singles performance timeline ===
Key
W	F	SF	QF	#R	RR	Q#	DNQ	A	NH

(W) winner; (F) finalist; (SF) semifinalist; (QF) quarterfinalist; (#R) rounds 4, 3, 2, 1; (RR) round-robin stage; (Q#) qualification round; (DNQ) did not qualify; (A) absent; (NH) not held; (SR) strike rate (events won / competed); (W–L) win–loss record.

	Yugoslavia							United States										
Tournament	1988	1989	1990	1991	1992	1993	1994	1995	1996	1997	1998	1999	2000	2001	2002	2003	SR	W–L
Grand Slam tournaments
Australian Open	A	A	A	W	W	W	A	A	W	A	A	SF	A	QF	SF	2R	4 / 8	43–4
French Open	A	SF	W	W	W	A	A	A	QF	SF	F	SF	QF	A	QF	1R	3 / 11	54–8
Wimbledon	A	4R	QF	A	F	A	A	A	2R	3R	QF	3R	QF	A	QF	A	0 / 9	30–9
US Open	A	4R	3R	W	W	A	A	F	F	QF	QF	QF	QF	4R	QF	A	2 / 12	53–10
Win–loss	0–0	11–3	13–2	21–0	27–1	7–0	0–0	6–1	17–3	11–3	14–3	16–4	12–3	7–2	17–4	1–2	9 / 40	180–31

Note: A walkover does not count as a win. Seles had a walkover in the second round of the US Open of 1996.

== Records ==
- These records were attained in Open Era of tennis.
- Records in **bold** indicate peer-less achievements.

Grand Slam	Years	Record accomplished	Player tied
**Australian Open—French Open**	**1990–93**	**Simultaneous holder of 3 consecutive Australian Open and French Open titles**	**Stands alone**
Australian Open	1991	Won title on the first attempt	Virginia Wade
Australian Open	1991–93	3 consecutive titles	Margaret Court; Evonne Goolagong; Steffi Graf; Martina Hingis
**Australian Open**	**1991–99**	**33 consecutive wins**	**Stands alone**
French Open	1990–92	3 consecutive titles	Justine Henin; Iga Świątek
**French Open**	**1990**	**Youngest ever champion (16 years old)**	**Stands alone**
Grand Slam tournaments	1991	100% (21–0) match winning percentage in 1 season	Margaret Court; Billie Jean King; Chris Evert; Steffi Graf; Serena Williams
Grand Slam tournaments	1992	Reached all four Grand Slam finals in a calendar year	Margaret Court; Chris Evert; Martina Navratilova; Steffi Graf; Martina Hingis; Justine Henin
**Australian Open, French Open and US Open**	**1993**	**Winner of 3 Grand Slam tournaments for 2 consecutive years**	**Stands alone**

== See also ==
- WTA Tour records
- Grand Slam (tennis)
- List of WTA number 1 ranked singles tennis players
- List of female tennis players
- List of tennis tournaments
- List of tennis rivalries
- List of Grand Slam women's singles champions
- Open Era tennis records – Women's singles
- Tennis statistics
- World number 1 women tennis players from 1883–present
- Grunting in tennis

== Notes ==
Sporting positions
Preceded by Steffi Graf; Steffi Graf; Steffi Graf; Steffi Graf; Steffi Graf	World No. 1 March 11, 1991 – August 4, 1991; August 12, 1991 – August 18, 1991; September 9, 1991 – June 6, 1993; August 15, 1995 – November 3, 1996 (with S. Graf); November 18, 1996 – November 24, 1996 (with S. Graf)	Succeeded by Steffi Graf; Steffi Graf; Steffi Graf; Steffi Graf; Steffi Graf
Awards and achievements
Preceded by Svetlana Kitić; Mateja Svet	Yugoslav Sportswoman of the Year; 1985; 1990	Succeeded by Mateja Svet; None
Preceded by Arantxa Sánchez Vicario	WTA Most Improved Player; 1990	Succeeded by Gabriela Sabatini
Preceded by Steffi Graf	WTA Player of the Year; 1991–1992	Succeeded by Steffi Graf
Preceded by Steffi Graf	ITF World Champion; 1991–1992	Succeeded by Steffi Graf
Preceded by Merlene Ottey	United Press International; Athlete of the Year; 1991, 1992	Succeeded by Wang Junxia
Preceded by None	Best Female Tennis Player ESPY Award; 1993	Succeeded by Steffi Graf
Preceded by None	Best Female Athlete ESPY Award; 1993	Succeeded by Julie Krone
Preceded by: Meredith McGrath; Mary Pierce	WTA Comeback Player of the Year; 1995; 1998	Succeeded by: Jennifer Capriati; Sabine Appelmans
Preceded by Bonnie Blair	Flo Hyman Memorial Award; 2000	Succeeded by Lisa Leslie
