= 1989 Suntory Japan Open Tennis Championships – Men's singles =

Men's singles
- 1989 Suntory Japan Open Tennis Championships

Final
- Champion: (Sweden) Stefan Edberg
- Runner-up: (Czechoslovakia) Ivan Lendl
- Score: 6–3, 2–6, 6–4

Details
- Draw: 56 (7 Q / 5 WC )
- Seeds: 16

Events
Singles	men	women
Doubles	men	women
← 1988 ·	Japan Open	· 1990 →

John McEnroe was the defending champion but lost in the semifinals to Stefan Edberg.

Edberg won in the final 6–3, 2–6, 6–4 against Ivan Lendl.

== Seeds ==
The top eight seeds received a bye to the second round.

1. (Czechoslovakia) Ivan Lendl (final)
2. (Sweden) Stefan Edberg (champion)
3. (United States) John McEnroe (semifinals)
4. (France) Yannick Noah (second round)
5. (United States) Brad Gilbert (quarterfinals)
6. (United States) Kevin Curren (second round)
7. (Ecuador) Andrés Gómez (second round)
8. (Sweden) Mikael Pernfors (second round)
9. (Israel) Amos Mansdorf (third round)
10. (United States) Dan Goldie (first round)
11. (Sweden) Anders Järryd (third round)
12. (United States) Jay Berger (first round)
13. (Australia) John Fitzgerald (second round)
14. (Australia) Wally Masur (third round)
15. (United States) Robert Seguso (second round)
16. (Australia) Pat Cash (second round)

== Draw ==
=== Key ===
- Q = Qualifier
- WC = Wild card
- LL = Lucky loser
- Alt = Alternate
- SE = Special exempt
- PR = Protected ranking
- ITF = ITF entry
- JE = Junior exempt
- w/o = Walkover
- r = Retired
- d = Defaulted
- SR = Special ranking

=== Finals ===
Semifinals
1	(Czechoslovakia) Ivan Lendl	6	6
(United States) Richard Matuszewski	2	2
3	(United States) John McEnroe	4	3
2	(Sweden) Stefan Edberg	6	6

Final
1	(Czechoslovakia) Ivan Lendl	3	6	4
2	(Sweden) Stefan Edberg	6	2	6

=== Top half ===
==== Section 1 ====
First round
(United States) P Chamberlin	6	7	7
SE	(United States) R Van't Hof	7	6	5
(United States) D Pate	7	2	3
Q	(United States) B Scanlon	6	6	6
(Canada) G Connell	6	6	5
16	(Australia) P Cash	4	7	7
10	(United States) D Goldie	6	2	1
(United States) J Pugh	3	6	6
(United States) M Davis	3	6	4
Q	(United States) G Van Emburgh	6	3	6
(Venezuela) N Pereira	7	7
(Australia) R Fromberg	6	6

Second round
1	(Czechoslovakia) I Lendl	7	6
(United States) P Chamberlin	6	3
Q	(United States) B Scanlon	2
16	(Australia) P Cash	4^{r}
(United States) J Pugh	4	6
Q	(United States) G Van Emburgh	6	7
(Venezuela) N Pereira	6	6
7	(Ecuador) A Gómez	4	1

Third round
1	(Czechoslovakia) I Lendl	6	6
Q	(United States) B Scanlon	2	4
Q	(United States) G Van Emburgh	7	3	1
(Venezuela) N Pereira	5	6	6

Quarterfinals
1	(Czechoslovakia) I Lendl	6	6
(Venezuela) N Pereira	2	2

==== Section 2 ====
First round
(United States) J Rive	2	4
(United States) G Layendecker	6	6
(Australia) J Stoltenberg	6	3	7
Q	(New Zealand) S Guy	4	6	6
Q	(Sweden) T Nydahl	4	3
13	(Australia) J Fitzgerald	6	6
12	(United States) J Berger	4	6
(Australia) B Dyke	6	7
(New Zealand) K Evernden	6	6
WC	(Japan) S Shiraishi	1	4
(United States) R Matuszewski	6	6
(Sweden) T Svantesson	4	3

Second round
4	(France) Y Noah	4	5
(United States) G Layendecker	6	7
(Australia) J Stoltenberg	5	6	7
13	(Australia) J Fitzgerald	7	2	5
(Australia) B Dyke	6	4	6
(New Zealand) K Evernden	4	6	7
(United States) R Matuszewski	7	1	7
6	(United States) K Curren	6	6	6

Third round
(United States) G Layendecker	4	6	4
(Australia) J Stoltenberg	6	3	6
(New Zealand) K Evernden	4	7	2
(United States) R Matuszewski	6	6	6

Quarterfinals
(Australia) J Stoltenberg	6	4	6
(United States) R Matuszewski	4	6	7

=== Bottom half ===
==== Section 3 ====
First round
WC	(Japan) T Tsuchihashi	6	7
(The Bahamas) R Smith	2	6
Q	(United States) J Grabb	7	4	6
WC	(Japan) T Fukui	5	6	0
WC	(Japan) S Ota	2	1
11	(Sweden) A Järryd	6	6
14	(Australia) W Masur	6	7
Q	(United Kingdom) A Castle	3	6
(France) J-P Fleurian	1	4
(India) R Krishnan	6	6
(Australia) B Drewett	7	3	7
(United States) M Anger	5	6	6

Second round
5	(United States) B Gilbert	6	6
WC	(Japan) T Tsuchihashi	1	3
Q	(United States) J Grabb	4	6	3
11	(Sweden) A Järryd	6	2	6
14	(Australia) W Masur	6	4	6
(India) R Krishnan	2	6	3
(Australia) B Drewett	2	2
3	(United States) J McEnroe	6	6

Third round
5	(United States) B Gilbert	6	6
11	(Sweden) A Järryd	0	2
14	(Australia) W Masur	2	0
3	(United States) J McEnroe	6	6

Quarterfinals
5	(United States) B Gilbert	6	4	1
3	(United States) J McEnroe	2	6	6

==== Section 4 ====
First round
WC	(Japan) H Nakano	4	1
(United States) S Davis	6	6
(Finland) O Rahnasto	6	6	5
(West Germany) C Saceanu	7	3	7
(Sweden) J Carlsson	2	6	3
9	(Israel) A Mansdorf	6	3	6
15	(United States) R Seguso	3	7	6
Q	(United States) K Flach	6	6	4
(Canada) G Michibata	5	2
(Czechoslovakia) M Šrejber	7	6
(United States) L Shiras	6	3
(India) Z Ali	7	6

Second round
8	(Sweden) M Pernfors	3	2
(United States) S Davis	6	6
(West Germany) C Saceanu	4	4
9	(Israel) A Mansdorf	6	6
15	(United States) R Seguso	3	3
(Czechoslovakia) M Šrejber	6	6
(India) Z Ali	2	2
2	(Sweden) S Edberg	6	6

Third round
(United States) S Davis	6	7	6
9	(Israel) A Mansdorf	7	6	3
(Czechoslovakia) M Šrejber	4	4
2	(Sweden) S Edberg	6	6

Quarterfinals
(United States) S Davis	4	2
2	(Sweden) S Edberg	6	6
