= 1989 Suntory Japan Open Tennis Championships – Women's doubles =

Women's doubles
- 1989 Suntory Japan Open Tennis Championships

Final
- Champions: (Canada) Jill Hetherington (Australia) Elizabeth Smylie
- Runners-up: (United States) Ann Henricksson (United States) Beth Herr
- Score: 6–1, 6–3

Events
Singles	men	women
Doubles	men	women
← 1988 ·	Japan Open	· 1990 →

Gigi Fernández and Robin White were the defending champions but did not compete that year.

Jill Hetherington and Elizabeth Smylie won in the final 6–1, 6–3 against Ann Henricksson and Beth Herr.

== Seeds ==
Champion seeds are indicated in bold text while text in italics indicates the round in which those seeds were eliminated.

1. (United States) Betsy Nagelsen / (United States) Pam Shriver (first round)
2. (Canada) **Jill Hetherington** / (Australia) **Elizabeth Smylie (champions)**
3. (United States) Ann Henricksson / (United States) Beth Herr (final)
4. (United States) Lea Antonoplis / (United States) Cammy MacGregor (semifinals)

== Draw ==
=== Key ===
- Q = Qualifier
- WC = Wild card
- LL = Lucky loser
- Alt = Alternate
- ITF = ITF entry
- PR = Protected ranking
- SR = Special ranking
- SE = Special exempt
- JE = Junior exempt
- JR = Junior Accelerator Programme entrant
- CO = College Accelerator Programme entrant
- NG = Next Gen Accelerator Program entrant
- w/o = Walkover
- r = Retired
- d = Defaulted

First round
1	(United States) B Nagelsen (United States) P Shriver	4	2
(Australia) **A Minter** (New Zealand) **J Richardson**	**6**	**6**
(Japan) E Okagawa (Japan) K Okamoto	2	**6**	4
(Belgium) **A Devries** (Switzerland) **E Krapl**	**6**	2	**6**
3	(United States) **A Henricksson** (United States) **B Herr**	4	**6**	**6**
(Japan) E Inoue (Japan) A Kijimuta	**6**	2	4
(United States) A Grousbeck (Australia) L O'Neill	0	**6**	2
(Sweden) **M Lindström** (United States) **H Ludloff**	**6**	3	**6**
(Japan) M Kidowaki (Japan) A Nishiya	**7**	2	1
(United Kingdom) **A Hobbs** (Australia) **M Jaggard**	5	**6**	**6**
(Australia) L Field (Belgium) S Wasserman	3	3
4	(United States) **L Antonoplis** (United States) **C MacGregor**	**6**	**6**
(United States) L Allen (Poland) I Kuczyńska	3	6
(Hong Kong) **P Hy** (United States) **M Werdel**	**6**	**7**
(Japan) E Iida (Brazil) T Zambrzycki	0	2
2	(Canada) **J Hetherington** (Australia) **E Smylie**	**6**	**6**

Quarterfinals
(Australia) **A Minter** (New Zealand) **J Richardson**	**6**	3	**6**
(Belgium) A Devries (Switzerland) E Krapl	4	**6**	1
3	(United States) **A Henricksson** (United States) **B Herr**	**6**	**6**
(Sweden) M Lindström (United States) H Ludloff	3	2
(United Kingdom) A Hobbs (Australia) M Jaggard	2	2
4	(United States) **L Antonoplis** (United States) **C MacGregor**	**6**	**6**
(Hong Kong) P Hy (United States) M Werdel	2	1
2	(Canada) **J Hetherington** (Australia) **E Smylie**	**6**	**6**

Semifinals
(Australia) A Minter (New Zealand) J Richardson	4	4
3	(United States) **A Henricksson** (United States) **B Herr**	**6**	**6**
4	(United States) L Antonoplis (United States) C MacGregor	6	2
2	(Canada) **J Hetherington** (Australia) **E Smylie**	**7**	**6**

Final
3	(United States) Ann Henricksson (United States) Beth Herr	1	3
2	(Canada) **Jill Hetherington** (Australia) **Elizabeth Smylie**	**6**	**6**
