= 1988 Suntory Japan Open Tennis Championships =

- Date: 11–17 April
- Edition: 15th
- Surface: Hard / outdoor
- Location: Tokyo, Japan
- Venue: Ariake Coliseum

Champions

Men's singles
- (United States) John McEnroe

Women's singles
- (United States) Patty Fendick

Men's doubles
- (Australia) John Fitzgerald / (United States) Johan Kriek

Women's doubles
- (United States) Gigi Fernández / (United States) Robin White
← 1987 ·	Japan Open	· 1989 →

The 1988 Suntory Japan Open Tennis Championships was a tennis tournament played on outdoor hard courts at the Ariake Coliseum in Tokyo in Japan that was part of the 1988 Nabisco Grand Prix and of the Category 2 tier of the 1988 WTA Tour. The tournament ran from 11 April through 17 April 1988. John McEnroe and Patty Fendick won the singles titles.

== Finals ==
=== Men's singles ===
(United States) John McEnroe defeated (Sweden) Stefan Edberg 6–2, 6–2

- It was McEnroe's 1st title of the year and the 135th of his career.

=== Women's singles ===
(United States) Patty Fendick defeated (United States) Stephanie Rehe 6–3, 7–5

- It was Fendick's 4th title of the year and the 4th of her career.

=== Men's doubles ===
(Australia) John Fitzgerald / (United States) Johan Kriek defeated (United States) Steve Denton / (United States) David Pate 6–4, 6–7, 6–4

- It was Fitzgerald's 3rd title of the year and the 20th of his career. It was Kriek's 2nd title of the year and the 22nd of his career.

=== Women's doubles ===
(United States) Gigi Fernández / (United States) Robin White defeated (United States) Lea Antonoplis / (United States) Barbara Gerken 6–1, 6–4

- It was Fernández's 1st title of the year and the 9th of her career. It was White's 1st title of the year and the 7th of her career.
