= 1988 Suntory Japan Open Tennis Championships – Women's doubles =

Women's doubles
- 1988 Suntory Japan Open Tennis Championships

Final
- Champions: (United States) Gigi Fernández (United States) Robin White
- Runners-up: (United States) Lea Antonoplis (United States) Barbara Gerken
- Score: 6–1, 6–4

Events
Singles	men	women
Doubles	men	women
← 1987 ·	Japan Open	· 1989 →

Kathy Jordan and Betsy Nagelsen were the defending champions but only Nagelsen competed that year with Elizabeth Smylie.

Nagelsen and Smylie lost in the quarterfinals to Lea Antonoplis and Barbara Gerken.

Gigi Fernández and Betsy Nagelsen won in the final 6–1, 6–4 against Antonoplis and Gerken.

== Seeds ==
Champion seeds are indicated in bold text while text in italics indicates the round in which those seeds were eliminated.

1. (United States) Betsy Nagelsen / (Australia) Elizabeth Smylie (quarterfinals)
2. (United States) **Gigi Fernández** / (United States) **Robin White (champions)**
3. (Soviet Union) Leila Meskhi / (Soviet Union) Svetlana Parkhomenko (semifinals)
4. (Soviet Union) Larisa Savchenko / (Soviet Union) Natasha Zvereva (semifinals)

== Draw ==
=== Key ===
- Q = Qualifier
- WC = Wild card
- LL = Lucky loser
- Alt = Alternate
- SE = Special exempt
- PR = Protected ranking
- ITF = ITF entry
- JE = Junior exempt
- w/o = Walkover
- r = Retired
- d = Defaulted
- SR = Special ranking

First round
1	(United States) **B Nagelsen** (Australia) **E Smylie**	**6**	**6**
(Japan) E Iida (Japan) A Nishiya	2	3
(United States) **L Antonoplis** (United States) **B Gerken**	**6**	**6**
(Australia) A Minter (United States) M Van Nostrand	4	2
3	(Soviet Union) **L Meskhi** (Soviet Union) **S Parkhomenko**	**6**	**6**
(Belgium) A Devries (West Germany) S Meier	2	0
(Netherlands) **S Schilder** (Netherlands) **H Witvoet**	**6**	**6**
(Sweden) J Jonerup (Sweden) C Lindqvist	3	4
(United Kingdom) **J Salmon** (Netherlands) **B Schultz**	**7**	6	**7**
(Japan) K Okamoto (Japan) N Sato	6	**7**	6
(Japan) A Kijimuta (Hong Kong) P Moreno	4	1
4	(Soviet Union) **L Savchenko** (Soviet Union) **N Zvereva**	**6**	**6**
(United States) P Fendick (United States) A Henricksson	**6**	2	3
(New Zealand) **B Cordwell** (New Zealand) **J Richardson**	2	**6**	**6**
(Soviet Union) N Bykova (Soviet Union) N Medvedeva	2	1
2	(United States) **G Fernández** (United States) **R White**	**6**	**6**

Quarterfinals
1	(United States) B Nagelsen (Australia) E Smylie	3	6
(United States) **L Antonoplis** (United States) **B Gerken**	**6**	**7**
3	(Soviet Union) **L Meskhi** (Soviet Union) **S Parkohomenko**	**6**	**6**
(Netherlands) S Schilder (Netherlands) H Witvoet	1	3
(United Kingdom) J Salmon (Netherlands) B Schultz	3	2
4	(Soviet Union) **L Savchenko** (Soviet Union) **N Zvereva**	**6**	**6**
(New Zealand) B Cordwell (New Zealand) J Richardson	**6**	6	4
2	(United States) **G Fernández** (United States) **R White**	4	**7**	**6**

Semifinals
(United States) **L Antonoplis** (United States) **B Gerken**	**6**	**7**
3	(Soviet Union) L Meskhi (Soviet Union) S Parkhomenko	3	5
4	(Soviet Union) L Savchenko (Soviet Union) N Zvereva	6	**6**	5
2	(United States) **G Fernández** (United States) **R White**	**7**	1	**7**

Final
(United States) Lea Antonoplis (United States) Barbara Gerken	1	4
2	(United States) **Gigi Fernández** (United States) **Robin White**	**6**	**6**
