= 1988 Suntory Japan Open Tennis Championships – Women's singles =

Women's singles
- 1988 Suntory Japan Open Tennis Championships

Final
- Champion: (United States) Patty Fendick
- Runner-up: (United States) Stephanie Rehe
- Score: 6–3, 7–5

Details
- Draw: 32
- Seeds: 8

Events
Singles	men	women
Doubles	men	women
← 1987 ·	Japan Open	· 1989 →

Katerina Maleeva was the defending champion but did not compete that year.

Patty Fendick won in the final 6–3, 7–5 against Stephanie Rehe.

== Seeds ==
A champion seed is indicated in bold text while text in italics indicates the round in which that seed was eliminated.

1. (Soviet Union) Natasha Zvereva (second round)
2. (Soviet Union) Larisa Savchenko (quarterfinals)
3. (Sweden) Catarina Lindqvist (first round)
4. (United States) **Patty Fendick (champion)**
5. (Australia) Anne Minter (quarterfinals)
6. (United States) Stephanie Rehe (final)
7. (Japan) Etsuko Inoue (first round)
8. (United States) Gigi Fernández (second round)

== Draw ==
=== Key ===
- Q = Qualifier
- WC = Wild card
- LL = Lucky loser
- Alt = Alternate
- SE = Special exempt
- PR = Protected ranking
- ITF = ITF entry
- JE = Junior exempt
- w/o = Walkover
- r = Retired
- d = Defaulted
- SR = Special ranking

First round
1	(Soviet Union) **N Zvereva**	**6**	**6**
(Japan) M Yanagi	0	4
(United States) B Gerken	4	1
Q	(United Kingdom) **M Javer**	**6**	**6**
(Belgium) **A Devries**	**6**	4	**6**
(Australia) E Smylie	2	**6**	1
(Japan) M Kidowaki	2	2
6	(United States) **S Rehe**	**6**	**6**
3	(Sweden) C Lindqvist	**6**	1	3
(Netherlands) **B Schultz**	1	**6**	**6**
(United States) **B Nagelsen**	3	**6**	**6**
(Japan) A Kijimuta	**6**	4	3
(United States) L Bonder	5	4
(United States) **M Werdel**	**7**	**6**
(United States) M Van Nostrand	5	5
8	(United States) **G Fernández**	**7**	**7**
5	(Australia) **A Minter**	**6**	**6**
Q	(Australia) M Jaggard	2	2
(Netherlands) **H Witvoet**	**6**	**6**
(West Germany) S Meier	2	1
Q	(United States) **S Sloane**	**6**	**6**
(Soviet Union) S Parkhomenko	1	1
Q	(Soviet Union) N Medvedeva	4	6
4	(United States) **P Fendick**	**6**	**7**
7	(Japan) E Inoue	**6**	4	1
(Soviet Union) **N Bykova**	0	**6**	**6**
(United States) A Henricksson	3	4
(Soviet Union) **L Meskhi**	**6**	**6**
(New Zealand) B Cordwell	5	4
(United States) **R White**	**7**	**6**
(Japan) K Okamoto	4	**6**	3
2	(Soviet Union) **L Savchenko**	**6**	2	**6**

Second round
1	(Soviet Union) N Zvereva	6	2
Q	(United Kingdom) **M Javer**	**7**	**6**
(Belgium) A Devries	1	2
6	(United States) **S Rehe**	**6**	**6**
(Netherlands) **B Schultz**	**7**	**6**
(United States) B Nagelsen	6	4
(United States) **M Werdel**	**6**	**6**
8	(United States) G Fernández	2	4
5	(Australia) **A Minter**	4	**7**	**6**
(Netherlands) H Witvoet	**6**	6	3
Q	(United States) S Sloane	2	4
4	(United States) **P Fendick**	**6**	**6**
(Soviet Union) N Bykova	4	3
(Soviet Union) **L Meskhi**	**6**	**6**
(United States) R White	**6**	6	6
2	(Soviet Union) **L Savchenko**	3	**7**	**7**

Quarterfinals
Q	(United Kingdom) M Javer	5	1
6	(United States) **S Rehe**	**7**	**6**
(Netherlands) B Schultz	4	6
(United States) **M Werdel**	**6**	**7**
5	(Australia) A Minter	0	**6**	2
4	(United States) **P Fendick**	**6**	3	**6**
(Soviet Union) **L Meskhi**	**6**	2	**6**
2	(Soviet Union) L Savchenko	3	**6**	3

Semifinals
6	(United States) **S Rehe**	**6**	**6**
(United States) M Werdel	3	3
4	(United States) **P Fendick**	**6**	**6**
(Soviet Union) L Meskhi	0	3

Final
6	(United States) Stephanie Rehe	3	5
4	(United States) **Patty Fendick**	**6**	**7**
