= 1987 Suntory Japan Open Tennis Championships – Men's doubles =

Men's doubles
- 1987 Suntory Japan Open Tennis Championships

Final
- Champion: (United States) Paul Annacone; (United States) Kevin Curren
- Runner-up: (Ecuador) Andrés Gómez; (Sweden) Anders Järryd
- Score: 6–4, 7–6

Details
- Draw: 28
- Seeds: 8

Events
Singles	men	women
Doubles	men	women
- Japan Open

Matt Anger and Ken Flach were the defending champions, but lost in the quarterfinals to Jim Grabb and Brad Pearce.

Paul Annacone and Kevin Curren won the title, defeating Andrés Gómez and Anders Järryd in the final, 6–4, 7–6.

== Seeds ==
The top four seeds received a bye into the second round.

1. (Ecuador) Andrés Gómez / (Sweden) Anders Järryd (final)
2. (United States) Paul Annacone / (United States) Kevin Curren (champions)
3. (United States) Sherwood Stewart / (Australia) Kim Warwick (quarterfinals)
4. (Australia) Pat Cash / (United States) Mike Leach (second round)
5. (Australia) John Fitzgerald / (Australia) Wally Masur (second round)
6. (United States) Matt Anger / (United States) Ken Flach (quarterfinals)
7. (United States) Scott Davis / (United States) David Pate (quarterfinals)
8. (United States) Mike De Palmer / (United States) Johan Kriek (quarterfinals)

== Draw ==
Key

- Q = Qualifier
- WC = Wild card
- LL = Lucky loser
- Alt = Alternate
- ITF = ITF entry
- PR = Protected ranking
- SR = Special ranking
- SE = Special exempt
- JE = Junior exempt
- JR = Junior Accelerator Programme entrant
- CO = College Accelerator Programme entrant
- NG = Next Gen Accelerator Program entrant
- w/o = Walkover
- r = Retired
- d = Defaulted

=== Finals ===
Semifinals
1	(Ecuador) Andrés Gómez (Sweden) Anders Järryd	6	7
(United States) Andy Kohlberg (United States) Robert Van't Hof	4	6
(United States) Jim Grabb (United States) Brad Pearce	6	6
2	(United States) Paul Annacone (United States) Kevin Curren	7	7

Final
1	(Ecuador) Andrés Gómez (Sweden) Anders Järryd	4	6
2	(United States) Paul Annacone (United States) Kevin Curren	6	7

=== Top half ===
First round
(India) R Krishnan (New Zealand) R Simpson	3	7	6
(United States) P Wright (Peru) J Yzaga	6	6	2
(Japan) H Shirato (Japan) E Takeuchi	6	1
(United Kingdom) A Castle (United States) J Levine	7	6
(United States) D Goldie (United States) B Testerman	4	7	4
8	(United States) M De Palmer (United States) J Kriek	6	5	6
(United States) A Agassi (United States) J Sadri	4	6
(United States) J Lapidus (United States) B Willenborg	6	7
(United States) J Bailey (West Germany) D Keretić	3	6
(United States) A Kohlberg (United States) R Van't Hof	6	7
(Japan) K Tachibana (Japan) M Takeyari	3	4
5	(Australia) J Fitzgerald (Australia) W Masur	6	6

Second round
1	(Ecuador) A Gómez (Sweden) A Järryd	6	6
(India) R Krishnan (New Zealand) R Simpson	4	2
(United Kingdom) A Castle (United States) J Levine	6	2	5
8	(United States) M De Palmer (United States) J Kriek	4	6	7
3	(United States) S Stewart (Australia) K Warwick	6	6
(United States) J Lapidus (United States) B Willenborg	4	4
(United States) A Kohlberg (United States) R Van't Hof	6	6
5	(Australia) J Fitzgerald (Australia) W Masur	3	4

Quarterfinals
1	(Ecuador) A Gómez (Sweden) A Järryd	7	4	6
8	(United States) M De Palmer (United States) J Kriek	6	6	4
3	(United States) S Stewart (Australia) K Warwick	3	4
(United States) A Kohlberg (United States) R Van't Hof	6	6

Semifinals
1	(Ecuador) A Gómez (Sweden) A Järryd	6	7
(United States) A Kohlberg (United States) R Van't Hof	4	6

=== Bottom half ===
First round
6	(United States) M Anger (United States) K Flach	6	7
(Sweden) P Carlsson (France) J Fleurian	2	5
(Japan) S Matsuoka (Japan) T Yonezawa	7	1	2
(United States) B Scanlon (United States) B Schultz	6	6	6
(United States) K Jones (United States) T Pawsat	6	3
(United States) J Grabb (United States) B Pearce	7	6
7	(United States) S Davis (United States) D Pate	6	6
(United States) E Korita (Canada) G Michibata	4	4
(Australia) B Drewett (United States) B Green	7	6
(United States) C Cox (United States) R Matuszewski	6	2
(Japan) S Nishio (Japan) S Sakamoto	7	5	3
(Netherlands) M Schapers (Czechoslovakia) M Šrejber	6	7	6

Second round
6	(United States) M Anger (United States) K Flach	7	6
(United States) B Scanlon (United States) B Schultz	6	3
(United States) J Grabb (United States) B Pearce	6	7	6
4	(Australia) P Cash (United States) M Leach	7	6	4
7	(United States) S Davis (United States) D Pate	7	1	6
(Australia) B Drewett (United States) B Green	5	6	4
(Netherlands) M Schapers (Czechoslovakia) M Šrejber	4	6
2	(United States) P Annacone (United States) K Curren	6	7

Quarterfinals
6	(United States) M Anger (United States) K Flach	3	7	3
(United States) J Grabb (United States) B Pearce	6	6	6
7	(United States) S Davis (United States) D Pate	3	6	4
2	(United States) P Annacone (United States) K Curren	6	4	6

Semifinals
(United States) J Grabb (United States) B Pearce	6	6
2	(United States) P Annacone (United States) K Curren	7	7
