= 1985 Mercedes Cup =

- Date: 9–15 September
- Edition: 8th
- Category: Grand Prix
- Draw: 32S / 16D
- Prize money: $100,000
- Surface: Clay / outdoor
- Location: Stuttgart, West Germany
- Venue: Tennis Club Weissenhof

Champions

Singles
- (Czechoslovakia) Ivan Lendl

Doubles
- (Czechoslovakia) Ivan Lendl / (Czechoslovakia) Tomáš Šmíd
- Stuttgart Open

The 1985 Mercedes Cup, was a men's tennis tournament played on outdoor clay courts and held at the Tennis Club Weissenhof in Stuttgart, West Germany that was part of the 1985 Grand Prix circuit. It was the eighth edition of the tournament and was held from 9 September until 15 September 1985. First-seeded Ivan Lendl won the singles title.

== Finals ==
=== Singles ===
(Czechoslovakia) Ivan Lendl defeated (United States) Brad Gilbert, 6–4, 6–0

- It was Lendl's 7th singles title of the year and the 49th of his career.

=== Doubles ===
(Czechoslovakia) Ivan Lendl / (Czechoslovakia) Tomáš Šmíd defeated (United States) Andy Kohlberg / (Brazil) João Soares, 3–6, 6–4, 6–2
