= 1990 Thriftway ATP Championship =

1990 Thriftway ATP Championships
- Date: August 6–12
- Edition: 89th
- Category: ATP Championship Series, Single Week
- Draw: 56S / 28D
- Prize money: $1,020,000
- Surface: Hard / outdoor
- Location: Mason, Ohio, US
- Venue: Jack Nicklaus Sports Center

Champions

Singles
- (Sweden) Stefan Edberg

Doubles
- (Australia) Darren Cahill / (Australia) Mark Kratzmann
- Cincinnati Open

The 1990 Thriftway ATP Championship, also known as the Cincinnati Open, was a tennis tournament played on outdoor hard courts. It was the 89th edition of the tournament and was part of the ATP Championship Series, Single Week category of the 1990 ATP Tour. It took place in Mason, Ohio, United States from August 6 through August 12, 1990.

The tournament had previously appeared on the Tier III Series of the WTA Tour but no event was held from 1989 to 2003.

The singles field was headlined by World No. 1, Wimbledon champion, Tokyo outdoor, Los Angeles, Indian Wells Masters title holder and Australian Open runner-up, 1987 Cincinnati winner Stefan Edberg, San Francisco, Washington, Key Biscayne winner, French Open finalist Andre Agassi and Barcelona, Madrid and French Open winner Andrés Gómez. Other top seeds were Rotterdam, Orlando titlist Brad Gilbert, Tokyo outdoor finalist Aaron Krickstein, Jay Berger, Michael Chang and John McEnroe.

== Champions ==
=== Singles ===
(Sweden) Stefan Edberg defeated (United States) Brad Gilbert 6–1, 6–1

- It was Stefan Edberg's 5th title of the year and his 25th overall. It was his 2nd Masters title of the year and his 6th overall.

=== Doubles ===
(Australia) Darren Cahill / (Australia) Mark Kratzmann defeated (United Kingdom) Neil Broad / (South Africa) Gary Muller 7–6, 6–2.
