= 1987 Suntory Japan Open Tennis Championships – Women's singles =

Women's singles
- 1987 Suntory Japan Open Tennis Championships

Final
- Champion: (Bulgaria) Katerina Maleeva
- Runner-up: (United States) Barbara Gerken
- Score: 6–2, 6–3

Details
- Draw: 32 (4Q)
- Seeds: 8

Events
Singles	men	women
Doubles	men	women
- Japan Open

Helen Kelesi was the defending champion, but she chose to compete at Amelia Island during the same week.

Katerina Maleeva won the title by defeating Barbara Gerken 6–2, 6–3 in the final.

== Seeds ==
1. (United States) Melissa Gurney (quarterfinals)
2. (Bulgaria) Katerina Maleeva (champion)
3. (United States) Kathy Jordan (quarterfinals)
4. (United States) Betsy Nagelsen (semifinals)
5. (United Kingdom) Sara Gomer (second round)
6. (Hong Kong) Patricia Hy (first round)
7. (Japan) Etsuko Inoue (semifinals)
8. (United Kingdom) Anne Hobbs (first round)

== Draw ==
Key

- Q = Qualifier
- WC = Wild card
- LL = Lucky loser
- Alt = Alternate
- ITF = ITF entry
- PR = Protected ranking
- SR = Special ranking
- SE = Special exempt
- JE = Junior exempt
- JR = Junior Accelerator Programme entrant
- CO = College Accelerator Programme entrant
- NG = Next Gen Accelerator Program entrant
- w/o = Walkover
- r = Retired
- d = Defaulted

=== Finals ===
Semifinals
7	(Japan) Etsuko Inoue	2	6
(United States) Barbara Gerken	6	7
4	(United States) Betsy Nagelsen	6	6	3
2	(Bulgaria) Katerina Maleeva	1	7	6

Final
(United States) Barbara Gerken	2	3
2	(Bulgaria) Katerina Maleeva	6	6

=== Top half ===
First round
1	(United States) M Gurney	6	7
(Czechoslovakia) I Budařová	4	5
Q	(United States) L Antonoplis	7	6
(United States) AM Fernandez	5	1
(Australia) J Tremelling	3	3
(Japan) A Kijimuta	6	6
(Sweden) C Karlsson	5	0
7	(Japan) E Inoue	7	6
3	(United States) K Jordan	7	3	6
(Argentina) A Villagrán	6	6	2
(Switzerland) C Jolissaint	6	6
(United Kingdom) A Croft	4	3
(West Germany) C Porwik	6	4
(Australia) A Minter	7	6
(United States) B Gerken	6	6
6	(Hong Kong) P Hy	2	2

Second round
1	(United States) M Gurney	6	6
Q	(United States) L Antonoplis	1	2
(Japan) A Kijimuta	1	2
7	(Japan) E Inoue	6	6
3	(United States) K Jordan	6	6
(Switzerland) C Jolissaint	1	4
(Australia) A Minter	6	1	3
(United States) B Gerken	3	6	6

Quarterfinals
1	(United States) M Gurney	3	0
7	(Japan) E Inoue	6	6
3	(United States) K Jordan	3	6	5
(United States) B Gerken	6	3	7

Semifinals
7	(Japan) E Inoue	2	6
(United States) B Gerken	6	7

=== Bottom half ===
First round
8	(United Kingdom) A Hobbs	2	6	5
(United States) S Walsh-Pete	6	2	7
(Switzerland) L Drescher	1	3
Q	(Japan) K Okamoto	6	6
Q	(United States) S Collins	5	3
(France) P Paradis	7	6
(Japan) E Okagawa	0	4
4	(United States) B Nagelsen	6	6
5	(United Kingdom) S Gomer	6	6
(Japan) M Yanagi	0	1
(United States) B Herr	6	6
(United States) G Kim	1	0
Q	(New Zealand) B Cordwell	4	2
(United States) Ca MacGregor	6	6
(Brazil) N Dias	2	2
2	(Bulgaria) K Maleeva	6	6

Second round
(United States) S Walsh-Pete	3	4
Q	(Japan) K Okamoto	6	6
(France) P Paradis	1	0
4	(United States) B Nagelsen	6	6
5	(United Kingdom) S Gomer	5	3
(United States) B Herr	7	6
(United States) Ca MacGregor	5	3
2	(Bulgaria) K Maleeva	7	6

Quarterfinals
Q	(Japan) K Okamoto	6	4
4	(United States) B Nagelsen	7	6
(United States) B Herr	1	1
2	(Bulgaria) K Maleeva	6	6

Semifinals
4	(United States) B Nagelsen	6	6	3
2	(Bulgaria) K Maleeva	1	7	6
