= 1990 Suntory Japan Open Tennis Championships – Men's doubles =

Men's doubles
- 1990 Suntory Japan Open Tennis Championships

Final
- Champion: (Australia) Mark Kratzmann; (Australia) Wally Masur
- Runner-up: (United States) Kent Kinnear; (United States) Brad Pearce
- Score: 3–6, 6–3, 6–4

Details
- Draw: 28 (2Q)
- Seeds: 8

Events
Singles	men	women
Doubles	men	women
- Japan Open

Ken Flach and Robert Seguso were the defending champions, but did not participate this year.

Mark Kratzmann and Wally Masur won the title, defeating Kent Kinnear and Brad Pearce in the final, 3–6, 6–3, 6–4.

== Seeds ==
The top four seeds received a bye into the second round.

1. ~~Unknown (withdrew)~~
2. (United States) Jim Grabb / (United States) Patrick McEnroe (second round)
3. (Canada) Grant Connell / (Canada) Glenn Michibata (quarterfinals)
4. (United States) Scott Davis / (United States) David Pate (semifinals)
5. (Australia) Mark Kratzmann / (Australia) Wally Masur (champion)
6. (United States) Kelly Jones / (United States) Robert Van't Hof (first round)
7. (New Zealand) Kelly Evernden / (Venezuela) Nicolás Pereira (quarterfinals)
8. (Austria) Alex Antonitsch / (United Kingdom) Andrew Castle (first round)

== Draw ==
Key

- Q = Qualifier
- WC = Wild card
- LL = Lucky loser
- Alt = Alternate
- ITF = ITF entry
- PR = Protected ranking
- SR = Special ranking
- SE = Special exempt
- JE = Junior exempt
- JR = Junior Accelerator Programme entrant
- CO = College Accelerator Programme entrant
- NG = Next Gen Accelerator Program entrant
- w/o = Walkover
- r = Retired
- d = Defaulted

=== Finals ===
Semifinals
(United States) Kent Kinnear (United States) Brad Pearce	5	6	7
4	(United States) Scott Davis (United States) David Pate	7	3	5
5	(Australia) Mark Kratzmann (Australia) Wally Masur	6	6
(United States) Jonathan Canter (New Zealand) Bruce Derlin	2	4

Final
(United States) Kent Kinnear (United States) Brad Pearce	6	3	4
5	(Australia) Mark Kratzmann (Australia) Wally Masur	3	6	6

=== Top half ===
First round
(United Kingdom) N Brown (Sweden) J Carlsson	7	7
(Japan) H Nakano (Japan) S Nishio	5	5
(United States) K Kinnear (United States) B Pearce	6	6
(Puerto Rico) M Nido (United States) J Rive	4	2
(Australia) P Cash (Sweden) S Edberg	6	6
8	(Austria) A Antonitsch (United Kingdom) A Castle	3	4
(West Germany) C Saceanu (United States) J Tarango	3	4
(United States) P Chamberlin (United States) D Goldie	6	6
Q	(United Kingdom) M Petchey (United Kingdom) D Sapsford	3	2
(Australia) B Drewett (Australia) J Stoltenberg	6	6
(United States) S Cannon (United States) B Garnett	7	6
6	(United States) K Jones (United States) R Van't Hof	6	3

Second round
Q	(New Zealand) D Lewis (United States) J Russell	5	6	4
(United Kingdom) N Brown (Sweden) J Carlsson	7	4	6
(United States) K Kinnear (United States) B Pearce	6	3	6
(Australia) P Cash (Sweden) S Edberg	3	6	4
4	(United States) S Davis (United States) D Pate	6	6
(United States) P Chamberlin (United States) D Goldie	3	3
(Australia) B Drewett (Australia) J Stoltenberg	7	6
(United States) S Cannon (United States) B Garnett	6	3

Quarterfinals
(United Kingdom) N Brown (Sweden) J Carlsson	5	3
(United States) K Kinnear (United States) B Pearce	7	6
4	(United States) S Davis (United States) D Pate	6	6
(Australia) B Drewett (Australia) J Stoltenberg	1	1

Semifinals
(United States) K Kinnear (United States) B Pearce	5	6	7
4	(United States) S Davis (United States) D Pate	7	3	5

=== Bottom half ===
First round
5	(Australia) M Kratzmann (Australia) W Masur	6	6
(Japan) K Kiyomiya (Japan) Y Okada	4	2
(Japan) H Tanizawa (Japan) Y Yamamoto	6	5	4
(United States) D Cassidy (Canada) M Laurendeau	4	7	6
(United States) R Matuszewski (United States) L Shiras	6	2	7
(Israel) G Bloom (Israel) A Mansdorf	4	6	6
7	(New Zealand) K Evernden (Venezuela) N Pereira	6	6
(West Germany) P Kühnen (Socialist Federal Republic of Yugoslavia) S Živojinović	3	3
(Australia) T Woodbridge (Australia) S Youl	4	6	7
(Japan) S Matsuoka (Japan) S Ota	6	3	5
(United States) J Canter (New Zealand) B Derlin	6	6
(West Germany) A Mronz (Sweden) L Wahlgren	4	2

Second round
5	(Australia) M Kratzmann (Australia) W Masur	6	6
(United States) D Cassidy (Canada) M Laurendeau	4	4
(United States) R Matuszewski (United States) L Shiras	5	2
3	(Canada) G Connell (Canada) G Michibata	7	6
7	(New Zealand) K Evernden (Venezuela) N Pereira	6	2
(Australia) T Woodbridge (Australia) S Youl	4	2^{r}
(United States) J Canter (New Zealand) B Derlin	6	7
2	(United States) J Grabb (United States) P McEnroe	2	6

Quarterfinals
5	(Australia) M Kratzmann (Australia) W Masur	6	6
3	(Canada) G Connell (Canada) G Michibata	4	3
7	(New Zealand) K Evernden (Venezuela) N Pereira	6	6	6
(United States) J Canter (New Zealand) B Derlin	3	7	7

Semifinals
5	(Australia) M Kratzmann (Australia) W Masur	6	6
(United States) J Canter (New Zealand) B Derlin	2	4
