= 1987 Suntory Japan Open Tennis Championships – Men's singles =

Men's singles
- 1987 Suntory Japan Open Tennis Championships

Final
- Champion: (Sweden) Stefan Edberg
- Runner-up: (United States) David Pate
- Score: 7–6, 6–4

Details
- Draw: 56 (7Q / 5WC)
- Seeds: 16

Events
Singles	men	women
Doubles	men	women
- Japan Open

Ramesh Krishnan was the defending champion, but lost in the third round to Jimmy Connors 2–6, 4–6. Stefan Edberg won the title defeating David Pate in the final 7–6, 6–4.

== Seeds ==
The top eight seeds received a bye into the second round.

1. (Czechoslovakia) Ivan Lendl (third round)
2. (Sweden) Stefan Edberg (champion)
3. (Czechoslovakia) Miloslav Mečíř (third round)
4. ~~Unknown (withdrew)~~
5. (United States) Jimmy Connors (quarterfinals)
6. (Ecuador) Andrés Gómez (semifinals)
7. (Australia) Pat Cash (third round)
8. (United States) Johan Kriek (quarterfinals)
9. (United States) Kevin Curren (third round)
10. (Sweden) Anders Järryd (quarterfinals)
11. (India) Ramesh Krishnan (third round)
12. (Czechoslovakia) Milan Šrejber (second round)
13. (United States) Scott Davis (semifinals)
14. (Australia) Wally Masur (first round)
15. (United States) David Pate (final)
16. (United States) Paul Annacone (first round)

== Draw ==
Key

- Q = Qualifier
- WC = Wild card
- LL = Lucky loser
- Alt = Alternate
- ITF = ITF entry
- PR = Protected ranking
- SR = Special ranking
- SE = Special exempt
- JE = Junior exempt
- JR = Junior Accelerator Programme entrant
- CO = College Accelerator Programme entrant
- NG = Next Gen Accelerator Program entrant
- w/o = Walkover
- r = Retired
- d = Defaulted

=== Finals ===
Quarterfinals
15	(United States) David Pate	7	6
8	(United States) Johan Kriek	5	2
13	(United States) Scott Davis	6	6
5	(United States) Jimmy Connors	3	4
6	(Ecuador) Andrés Gómez	6	6
(United States) Andre Agassi	2	0
10	(Sweden) Anders Järryd	3	2
2	(Sweden) Stefan Edberg	6	6

Semifinals
15	(United States) David Pate	7	6
13	(United States) Scott Davis	5	1
6	(Ecuador) Andrés Gómez	6	6	2
2	(Sweden) Stefan Edberg	4	7	6

Final
15	(United States) David Pate	6	4
2	(Sweden) Stefan Edberg	7	6

=== Top half ===
==== Section 1 ====
First round
(Australia) B Drewett	4	5
(United States) R Matuszewski	6	7
Q	(United States) B Green	4	1
(United States) J Levine	6	6
Q	(United States) R Van't Hof	3	4
15	(United States) D Pate	6	6
9	(United States) K Curren	3	6	6
(United States) M Leach	6	4	4
(United States) J Sadri	2	2
(United States) C Cox	6	6
(United States) B Willenborg	3	7	6
Q	(United States) J Bailey	6	6	4

Second round
1	(Czechoslovakia) I Lendl	6	6
(United States) R Matuszewski	4	4
(United States) J Levine	6	6	3
15	(United States) D Pate	7	4	6
9	(United States) K Curren	6	6
(United States) C Cox	2	4
(United States) B Willenborg	3	1
8	(United States) J Kriek	6	6

Third round
1	(Czechoslovakia) I Lendl	6	6	6
15	(United States) D Pate	7	4	7
9	(United States) K Curren	6	4	3
8	(United States) J Kriek	3	6	6

Quarterfinals
15	(United States) D Pate	7	6
8	(United States) J Kriek	5	2

==== Section 2 ====
First round
Q	(Japan) H Shirato	1	4
WC	(Japan) T Fukui	6	6
(Sweden) T Högstedt	3	6	6
(United States) B Schultz	6	1	4
(United States) J Lapidus	4	3
13	(United States) S Davis	6	6
11	(India) R Krishnan	6	6
(United Kingdom) A Castle	3	1
(Peru) J Yzaga	3	7	6
(United States) B Testerman	6	6	7
(United States) B Pearce	6	6
(France) J Fleurian	1	4

Second round
3	(Czechoslovakia) M Mečíř	7	6
WC	(Japan) T Fukui	5	1
(Sweden) T Högstedt	2^{r}
13	(United States) S Davis	5
11	(India) R Krishnan	6	4	6
(United States) B Testerman	3	6	4
(United States) B Pearce	1	1
5	(United States) J Connors	6	6

Third round
3	(Czechoslovakia) M Mečíř	5	1
13	(United States) S Davis	7	6
11	(India) R Krishnan	2	4
5	(United States) J Connors	6	6

Quarterfinals
13	(United States) S Davis	6	6
5	(United States) J Connors	3	4

=== Bottom half ===
==== Section 3 ====
First round
(Australia) J Fitzgerald	2	2
(West Germany) M Westphal	6	6
(United States) B Scanlon	6	7
WC	(Japan) T Tsuchihashi	3	5
(New Zealand) R Simpson	4	4
12	(Czechoslovakia) M Šrejber	6	6
14	(Australia) W Masur	6	4
(United States) A Agassi	7	6
(West Germany) D Keretić	6	4	2
(Netherlands) M Schapers	4	6	6
(United States) M Anger	6	6
(United States) M De Palmer	1	3

Second round
6	(Ecuador) A Gómez	6	7
(West Germany) M Westphal	1	5
(United States) B Scanlon	4	7	7
12	(Czechoslovakia) M Šrejber	6	6	6
(United States) A Agassi	6	5	6
(Netherlands) M Schapers	1	7	3
(United States) M Anger	6	6
LL	(Japan) T Yonezawa	1	0

Third round
6	(Ecuador) A Gómez	6	6
(United States) B Scanlon	3	4
(United States) A Agassi	5	6	6
(United States) M Anger	7	3	2

Quarterfinals
6	(Ecuador) A Gómez	6	6
(United States) A Agassi	2	0

==== Section 4 ====
First round
(Sweden) P Carlsson	6	3	3
Q	(United States) A Kohlberg	3	6	6
WC	(Japan) S Matsuoka	6	5	6
(United States) K Jones	1	7	2
Q	(United States) K Flach	3	3
10	(Sweden) A Järryd	6	6
16	(United States) P Annacone	6	7	5
Q	(Canada) G Michibata	7	6	7
WC	(Japan) S Shiraishi	2	2
(United States) D Goldie	6	6
WC	(Japan) T Omono	2	2
(United States) J Grabb	6	6

Second round
7	(Australia) P Cash	6	6	6
Q	(United States) A Kohlberg	7	4	4
WC	(Japan) S Matsuoka	3	4
10	(Sweden) A Järryd	6	6
Q	(Canada) G Michibata	4	2
(United States) D Goldie	6	6
(United States) J Grabb	5	4
2	(Sweden) S Edberg	7	6

Third round
7	(Australia) P Cash	4	6	4
10	(Sweden) A Järryd	6	2	6
(United States) D Goldie	3	5
2	(Sweden) S Edberg	6	7

Quarterfinals
10	(Sweden) A Järryd	3	2
2	(Sweden) S Edberg	6	6
