= 1988 Suntory Japan Open Tennis Championships – Men's doubles =

Men's doubles
- 1988 Suntory Japan Open Tennis Championships

Final
- Champion: (Australia) John Fitzgerald; (United States) Johan Kriek
- Runner-up: (United States) Steve Denton; (United States) David Pate
- Score: 6–4, 6–7, 6–4

Details
- Draw: 28
- Seeds: 8

Events
Singles	men	women
Doubles	men	women
- Japan Open

Paul Annacone and Kevin Curren were the defending champions, but did not compete this year.

John Fitzgerald and Johan Kriek won the title, defeating Steve Denton and David Pate in the final, 6–4, 6–7, 6–4.

== Seeds ==
The top four seeds received a bye into the second round.

1. (United States) Gary Donnelly / (United States) Jim Grabb (second round)
2. (Australia) John Fitzgerald / (United States) Johan Kriek (champion)
3. (United States) Andy Kohlberg / (United States) Robert Van't Hof (semifinals)
4. (United States) Steve Denton / (United States) David Pate (final)
5. (Australia) Brad Drewett / (Australia) Kim Warwick (quarterfinals)
6. (United States) Scott Davis / (United States) Kelly Jones (first round)
7. (United States) Peter Fleming / (United States) Tim Pawsat (quarterfinals)
8. (United Kingdom) Jeremy Bates / (United States) Dan Goldie (quarterfinals)

== Draw ==
Key

- Q = Qualifier
- WC = Wild card
- LL = Lucky loser
- Alt = Alternate
- ITF = ITF entry
- PR = Protected ranking
- SR = Special ranking
- SE = Special exempt
- JE = Junior exempt
- JR = Junior Accelerator Programme entrant
- CO = College Accelerator Programme entrant
- NG = Next Gen Accelerator Program entrant
- w/o = Walkover
- r = Retired
- d = Defaulted

=== Finals ===
Semifinals
(United States) Joey Rive (United States) Leif Shiras	2	6	2
4	(United States) Steve Denton (United States) David Pate	6	2	6
3	(United States) Andy Kohlberg (United States) Robert Van't Hof	3	3
2	(Australia) John Fitzgerald (United States) Johan Kriek	6	6

Final
4	(United States) Steve Denton (United States) David Pate	4	7	4
2	(Australia) John Fitzgerald (United States) Johan Kriek	6	6	6

=== Top half ===
First round
(United States) J Rive (United States) L Shiras	6	6
(United States) R Baxter (Nigeria) N Odizor	3	4
(United Kingdom) A Castle (Argentina) R Saad	6	3	7
(Japan) S Ota (Japan) T Tsuchihashi	2	6	6
(United Kingdom) S Shaw (Sweden) S Svensson	6	2	5
8	(United Kingdom) J Bates (United States) D Goldie	2	6	7
(United States) P Chamberlin (United States) L Scott	6	3
(Japan) S Matsuoka (United States) D Rostagno	7	6
(Japan) S Nishio (Japan) S Sakamoto	6	7
(Japan) H Shirato (Japan) E Takeuchi	3	5
(United States) E Korita (United States) B Pearce	6	6
6	(United States) S Davis (United States) K Jones	4	4

Second round
1	(United States) G Donnelly (United States) J Grabb	6	4	2
(United States) J Rive (United States) L Shiras	1	6	6
(United Kingdom) A Castle (Argentina) R Saad	2	6
8	(United Kingdom) J Bates (United States) D Goldie	6	7
4	(United States) S Denton (United States) D Pate	6	6
(Japan) S Matsuoka (United States) D Rostagno	3	4
(Japan) S Nishio (Japan) S Sakamoto	7	0	6
(United States) E Korita (United States) B Pearce	5	6	4

Quarterfinals
(United States) J Rive (United States) L Shiras	6	7
8	(United Kingdom) J Bates (United States) D Goldie	3	6
4	(United States) S Denton (United States) D Pate	6	6
(Japan) S Nishio (Japan) S Sakamoto	4	4

Semifinals
(United States) J Rive (United States) L Shiras	2	6	2
4	(United States) S Denton (United States) D Pate	6	2	6

=== Bottom half ===
First round
5	(Australia) B Drewett (Australia) K Warwick	6	6
(United States) T Nelson (The Bahamas) R Smith	3	4
(Australia) J Frawley (Australia) S Youl	7	6
(Sweden) J Carlsson (United States) J Letts	6	3
(West Germany) P Moraing (West Germany) A Mronz	5	3
(United States) M Anger (United States) G Holmes	7	6
7	(United States) P Fleming (United States) T Pawsat	6	6
(West Germany) W Popp (United States) E Teltscher	4	4
(United States) J Levine (United States) B Scanlon	3	4
(United States) J Canter (United States) P Palandjian	6	6
(United States) J Ross (United States) T Siegel	7	5	6
(United States) J De Foor (United States) B Man-Son-Hing	6	7	2

Second round
5	(Australia) B Drewett (Australia) K Warwick	7	3	6
(Australia) J Frawley (Australia) S Youl	5	6	2
(United States) M Anger (United States) G Holmes	4	6
3	(United States) A Kohlberg (United States) R Van't Hof	6	7
7	(United States) P Fleming (United States) T Pawsat	3	6	6
(United States) J Canter (United States) P Palandjian	6	3	2
(United States) J Ross (United States) T Siegel	4	3
2	(Australia) J Fitzgerald (United States) J Kriek	6	6

Quarterfinals
5	(Australia) B Drewett (Australia) K Warwick	4	4
3	(United States) A Kohlberg (United States) R Van't Hof	6	6
7	(United States) P Fleming (United States) T Pawsat	4	3
2	(Australia) J Fitzgerald (United States) J Kriek	6	6

Semifinals
3	(United States) A Kohlberg (United States) R Van't Hof	3	3
2	(Australia) J Fitzgerald (United States) J Kriek	6	6
