= 1989 Suntory Japan Open Tennis Championships – Women's singles =

Women's singles
- 1989 Suntory Japan Open Tennis Championships

Final
- Champion: (Japan) Kumiko Okamoto
- Runner-up: (Australia) Elizabeth Smylie
- Score: 6–4, 6–2

Events
Singles	men	women
Doubles	men	women
← 1988 ·	Japan Open	· 1990 →

Patty Fendick was the defending champion but did not compete that year.

Kumiko Okamoto won in the final 6–4, 6–2 against Elizabeth Smylie.

== Seeds ==
A champion seed is indicated in bold text while text in italics indicates the round in which that seed was eliminated.

1. (Australia) Anne Minter (semifinals)
2. (New Zealand) Belinda Cordwell (semifinals)
3. (United States) Ann Henricksson (second round)
4. (Belgium) Sandra Wasserman (quarterfinals)
5. (Japan) Etsuko Inoue (quarterfinals)
6. (United States) Betsy Nagelsen (quarterfinals)
7. (United Kingdom) Monique Javer (second round)
8. (United States) Louise Allen (first round)

== Draw ==
=== Key ===
- Q = Qualifier
- WC = Wild card
- LL = Lucky loser
- Alt = Alternate
- ITF = ITF entry
- PR = Protected ranking
- SR = Special ranking
- SE = Special exempt
- JE = Junior exempt
- JR = Junior Accelerator Programme entrant
- CO = College Accelerator Programme entrant
- NG = Next Gen Accelerator Program entrant
- w/o = Walkover
- r = Retired
- d = Defaulted

First round
1	(Australia) **A Minter**	**6**	**6**
(Japan) M Yanagi	1	4
(United States) **M Werdel**	**7**	**6**
(Netherlands) H Witvoet	5	0
(United Kingdom) A Hobbs	**6**	1	3
(United States) **L Bonder-Kreiss**	4	**6**	**6**
(Australia) L Field	4	**6**	3
6	(United States) **B Nagelsen**	**6**	4	**6**
4	(Belgium) **S Wasserman**	**6**	**6**
(Japan) A Kijimuta	3	2
(Japan) A Nishiya	2	**6**	1
(Belgium) **A Devries**	**6**	4	**6**
(Poland) I Kuczyńska	6	4
(Australia) **E Smylie**	**7**	**6**
(Australia) M Jaggard	3	3
7	(United Kingdom) **M Javer**	**6**	**6**
8	(United States) L Allen	**6**	2	0
Q	(Japan) **K Okamoto**	2	**6**	**6**
(United States) **L-A Eldredge**	**6**	**6**
Q	(Brazil) T Zambrzycki	2	1
(Japan) M Kidowaki	1	0
Q	(Japan) **K Date**	**6**	**6**
(New Zealand) J Richardson	1	2
3	(United States) **A Henricksson**	**6**	**6**
5	(Japan) **E Inoue**	**6**	**6**
(Japan) N Sawamatsu	1	2
(West Germany) **M Pawlik**	**6**	**7**
(United States) B Herr	2	5
Q	(Japan) **N Miyagi**	**6**	**6**
(Canada) J Hetherington	2	1
(Netherlands) C Bakkum	2	1
2	(New Zealand) **B Cordwell**	**6**	**6**

Second round
1	(Australia) **A Minter**	**6**	**6**
(United States) M Werdel	3	4
(United States) L Bonder-Kreiss	**6**	1	0
6	(United States) **B Nagelsen**	4	**6**	**6**
4	(Belgium) **S Wasserman**	**6**	**6**
(Belgium) A Devries	2	4
(Australia) **E Smylie**	6	**6**	**6**
7	(United Kingdom) M Javer	**7**	2	1
Q	(Japan) **K Okamoto**	**6**	**6**
(United States) L-A Eldredge	4	3
Q	(Japan) **K Date**	**7**	3	**6**
3	(United States) A Henricksson	6	**6**	3
5	(Japan) **E Inoue**	**6**	3	**6**
(West Germany) M Pawlik	3	**6**	2
Q	(Japan) N Miyagi	2	**6**	1
2	(New Zealand) **B Cordwell**	**6**	3	**6**

Quarterfinals
1	(Australia) **A Minter**	**7**	**6**
6	(United States) B Nagelsen	5	1
4	(Belgium) S Wasserman	5	4
(Australia) **E Smylie**	**7**	**6**
Q	(Japan) **K Okamoto**	**7**	**6**
Q	(Japan) K Date	5	4
5	(Japan) E Inoue	3	3
2	(New Zealand) **B Cordwell**	**6**	**6**

Semifinals
1	(Australia) A Minter	4	**6**	6
(Australia) **E Smylie**	**6**	4	**7**
Q	(Japan) **K Okamoto**	**6**	**6**
2	(New Zealand) B Cordwell	2	4

Final
(Australia) Elizabeth Smylie	4	2
Q	(Japan) **Kumiko Okamoto**	**6**	**6**
