= 1990 Thriftway ATP Championships – Doubles =

Doubles
- 1990 Thriftway ATP Championships

Final
- Champions: (Australia) Darren Cahill (Australia) Mark Kratzmann
- Runners-up: (United Kingdom) Neil Broad (South Africa) Gary Muller
- Score: 7–6, 6–2

Events
Singles	Doubles
← 1989 ·	Thriftway ATP Championships	· 1991 →

The 1990 Cincinnati Open, (also known as the Thriftway ATP Championships for sponsorship reasons) was a tennis tournament played on outdoor hard courts. It was the 91st edition of the tournament and was part of the 1990 ATP Tour. It took place in Cincinnati, Ohio, United States from August 13 through August 20, 1990. Ken Flach and Robert Seguso were the defending champions, but lost in the second round to Sven Salumaa and Byron Talbot. Darren Cahill and Mark Kratzmann won in the final, 7–6, 6–2, against Neil Broad and Gary Muller.

== Seeds ==
The top four seeded teams received byes to the second round.

1. (South Africa) Pieter Aldrich / (South Africa) Danie Visser (quarterfinals)
2. (United States) Rick Leach / (United States) Jim Pugh (semifinals)
3. (Canada) Grant Connell / (Canada) Glenn Michibata (second round)
4. (Mexico) Jorge Lozano / (United States) Todd Witsken (second round)
5. (France) Guy Forget / (Switzerland) Jakob Hlasek (semifinals)
6. (United States) Scott Davis / (United States) David Pate (first round)
7. (Australia) Darren Cahill / (Australia) Mark Kratzmann (champions)
8. (United States) Ken Flach / (United States) Robert Seguso (second round)

== Draw ==
=== Key ===
- Q = Qualifier
- WC = Wild card
- LL = Lucky loser
- Alt = Alternate
- SE = Special exempt
- PR = Protected ranking
- ITF = ITF entry
- JE = Junior exempt
- w/o = Walkover
- r = Retired
- d = Defaulted
- SR = Special ranking

=== Finals ===
Semifinals
7	(Australia) Darren Cahill (Australia) Mark Kratzmann	7	7
5	(France) Guy Forget (Switzerland) Jakob Hlasek	6	5
(United Kingdom) Neil Broad (South Africa) Gary Muller	6	6
2	(United States) Rick Leach (United States) Jim Pugh	3	4

Final
7	(Australia) Darren Cahill (Australia) Mark Kratzmann	7	6
(United Kingdom) Neil Broad (South Africa) Gary Muller	6	2

=== Top half ===
First round
(United Kingdom) J Bates (United States) K Curren	6	4
(Czechoslovakia) P Korda (United States) P McEnroe	7	6
(Australia) P Cash (South Africa) C van Rensburg	4	3
(Australia) B Dyke (Sweden) P Lundgren	6	6
(United States) S Cannon (United States) J Canter	2	3
7	(Australia) D Cahill (Australia) M Kratzmann	6	6
(Australia) J Stoltenberg (Australia) T Woodbridge	6	4	6
(United States) G Layendecker (United States) R Reneberg	4	6	3
(Ecuador) A Gómez (Australia) M Woodforde	5	4
(Australia) J Fitzgerald (Sweden) A Järryd	7	6
(United States) M Davis (United States) K Kinnear	4	5
5	(France) G Forget (Switzerland) J Hlasek	6	7

Second round
1	(South Africa) P Aldrich (South Africa) D Visser	7	4	7
(Czechoslovakia) P Korda (United States) P McEnroe	6	6	6
(Australia) B Dyke (Sweden) P Lundgren	5	6	4
7	(Australia) D Cahill (Australia) M Kratzmann	7	4	6
3	(Canada) G Connell (Canada) G Michibata	4	4
(Australia) J Stoltenberg (Australia) T Woodbridge	6	6
(Australia) J Fitzgerald (Sweden) A Järryd	5	2
5	(France) G Forget (Switzerland) J Hlasek	7	6

Quarterfinals
1	(South Africa) P Aldrich (South Africa) D Visser	3	4
7	(Australia) D Cahill (Australia) M Kratzmann	6	6
(Australia) J Stoltenberg (Australia) T Woodbridge	1	2
5	(France) G Forget (Switzerland) J Hlasek	6	6

Semifinals
7	(Australia) D Cahill (Australia) M Kratzmann	7	7
5	(France) G Forget (Switzerland) J Hlasek	6	5

=== Bottom half ===
First round
6	(United States) S Davis (United States) D Pate	4	4
(United States) J Courier (United States) P Sampras	6	6
(Austria) A Antonitsch (Nigeria) N Odizor	6	7
(Italy) D Nargiso (Venezuela) N Pereira	4	5
Q	(United States) J Letts (United States) M Robertson	3	4
(United Kingdom) N Broad (South Africa) G Muller	6	6
8	(United States) K Flach (United States) R Seguso	3	6	6
(Sweden) J Svensson (Sweden) M Wilander	6	4	4
Q	(United States) S Salumaa (South Africa) B Talbot	3	7	6
(Australia) D Macpherson (Australia) L Warder	6	6	4
(United States) P Galbraith (South Africa) S Kruger	6	6
(United States) C Beckman (United States) L Jensen	1	2

Second round
(United States) J Courier (United States) P Sampras	6	4	3
(Austria) A Antonitsch (Nigeria) N Odizor	3	6	6
(United Kingdom) N Broad (South Africa) G Muller	6	6
4	(Mexico) J Lozano (United States) T Witsken	3	4
8	(United States) K Flach (United States) R Seguso	6	6
Q	(United States) S Salumaa (South Africa) B Talbot	7	7
(United States) P Galbraith (South Africa) S Kruger	4	5
2	(United States) R Leach (United States) J Pugh	6	7

Quarterfinals
(Austria) A Antonitsch (Nigeria) N Odizor	6	4
(United Kingdom) N Broad (South Africa) G Muller	7	6
Q	(United States) S Salumaa (South Africa) B Talbot	2	6
2	(United States) R Leach (United States) J Pugh	6	7

Semifinals
(United Kingdom) N Broad (South Africa) G Muller	6	6
2	(United States) R Leach (United States) J Pugh	3	4
