= 1990 Suntory Japan Open Tennis Championships – Women's singles =

Women's singles
- 1990 Suntory Japan Open Tennis Championships

Final
- Champion: (Sweden) Catarina Lindqvist
- Runner-up: (Australia) Elizabeth Smylie
- Score: 6–3, 6–2

Details
- Draw: 32 (4Q / 2WC)
- Seeds: 8

Events
Singles	men	women
Doubles	men	women
- Japan Open

Kumiko Okamoto was the defending champion, but lost in the quarterfinals to Elizabeth Smylie.

Catarina Lindqvist won the title, defeating Smylie in the final, 6–3, 6–2.

== Seeds ==
1. (Sweden) Catarina Lindqvist (champion)
2. (Australia) Anne Minter (first round)
3. (United States) Lori McNeil (first round)
4. (United States) Betsy Nagelsen (second round)
5. (New Zealand) Belinda Cordwell (quarterfinals)
6. (Australia) Elizabeth Smylie (final)
7. (Japan) Etsuko Inoue (second round)
8. (Japan) Akiko Kijimuta (first round)

== Draw ==
Key

- Q = Qualifier
- WC = Wild card
- LL = Lucky loser
- Alt = Alternate
- ITF = ITF entry
- PR = Protected ranking
- SR = Special ranking
- SE = Special exempt
- JE = Junior exempt
- JR = Junior Accelerator Programme entrant
- CO = College Accelerator Programme entrant
- NG = Next Gen Accelerator Program entrant
- w/o = Walkover
- r = Retired
- d = Defaulted

=== Finals ===
Semifinals
1	(Sweden) Catarina Lindqvist	6	6
Q	(Czechoslovakia) Eva Švíglerová	1	2
6	(Australia) Elizabeth Smylie	6	6
WC	(Japan) Naoko Sawamatsu	1	2

Final
1	(Sweden) Catarina Lindqvist	6	6
6	(Australia) Elizabeth Smylie	3	2

=== Top half ===
First round
1	(Sweden) C Lindqvist	6	6
Q	(United Kingdom) J Durie	4	4
(Belgium) S Appelmans	6	6
(West Germany) E Pfaff	2	2
(Switzerland) E Krapl	2	7	4
(West Germany) M Pawlik	6	5	6
(Australia) L Field	5	6	4
5	(New Zealand) B Cordwell	7	3	6
3	(United States) L McNeil	6	6^{2}	5
(United States) A Henricksson	4	7^{7}	7
(Japan) M Kidowaki	7^{7}	3	3
Q	(Czechoslovakia) E Švíglerová	6^{3}	6	6
(United Kingdom) M Javer	7^{9}	6
(United States) R White	6^{7}	3
(Japan) N Miyagi	6	6
8	(Japan) A Kijimuta	3	3

Second round
1	(Sweden) C Lindqvist	7	6
(Belgium) S Appelmans	5	2
(West Germany) M Pawlik	5	2
5	(New Zealand) B Cordwell	7	6
(United States) A Henricksson	1	2
Q	(Czechoslovakia) E Švíglerová	6	6
(United Kingdom) M Javer	7^{11}	6
(Japan) N Miyagi	6^{9}	2

Quarterfinals
1	(Sweden) C Lindqvist	6	6
5	(New Zealand) B Cordwell	2	2
Q	(Czechoslovakia) E Švíglerová	6	6
(United Kingdom) M Javer	1	4

Semifinals
1	(Sweden) C Lindqvist	6	6
Q	(Czechoslovakia) E Švíglerová	1	2

=== Bottom half ===
First round
6	(Australia) E Smylie	3	6	7
Q	(United Kingdom) C Wood	6	1	5
(Belgium) S Wasserman	6	6
(Australia) M Jaggard	4	3
(United States) M Werdel	3	2
(Japan) K Okamoto	6	6
(United States) H Na	1	2
4	(United States) B Nagelsen	6	6
7	(Japan) E Inoue	6	6
Q	(Australia) K Godridge	0	1
(Japan) K Date	6	6
(Australia) J-A Faull	0	0
WC	(Japan) N Sawamatsu	6	6
WC	(Japan) R Hiraki	3	1
(United States) L Allen	6	6
2	(Australia) A Minter	4	4

Second round
6	(Australia) E Smylie	5	6	6
(Belgium) S Wasserman	7	0	1
(Japan) K Okamoto	6	6
4	(United States) B Nagelsen	1	2
7	(Japan) E Inoue	2	4
(Japan) K Date	6	6
WC	(Japan) N Sawamatsu	7^{7}	7
(United States) L Allen	6^{1}	5

Quarterfinals
6	(Australia) E Smylie	6	6
(Japan) K Okamoto	3	2
(Japan) K Date	4	6^{1}
WC	(Japan) N Sawamatsu	6	7^{7}

Semifinals
6	(Australia) E Smylie	6	6
WC	(Japan) N Sawamatsu	1	2
