= 1990 Thriftway ATP Championships – Singles =

Singles
- 1990 Thriftway ATP Championships

Final
- Champion: (Sweden) Stefan Edberg
- Runner-up: (United States) Brad Gilbert
- Score: 6–1, 6–1

Details
- Draw: 56
- Seeds: 16

Events
| Singles | Doubles |
- Thriftway ATP Championships

Stefan Edberg defeated the defending champion Brad Gilbert in the final, 6–1, 6–1 to win the singles' tennis title at the 1990 Cincinnati Masters. With the win, he captured the world No. 1 ranking from Ivan Lendl.

== Seeds ==
The top eight seeds received a bye to the second round.

1. (Sweden) Stefan Edberg (champion)
2. (United States) Andre Agassi (third round)
3. (Ecuador) Andrés Gómez (semifinals)
4. (United States) Brad Gilbert (final)
5. (United States) Aaron Krickstein (third round)
6. (United States) Jay Berger (third round)
7. (United States) Michael Chang (quarterfinals)
8. (United States) John McEnroe (third round)
9. (Soviet Union) Andrei Chesnokov (second round)
10. (United States) Pete Sampras (third round)
11. (United States) Jim Courier (quarterfinals)
12. (Sweden) Jonas Svensson (first round)
13. (France) Guy Forget (third round)
14. (United States) Tim Mayotte (first round)
15. (Australia) Richard Fromberg (quarterfinals)
16. (Czechoslovakia) Petr Korda (first round)

== Draw ==
Key

- Q = Qualifier
- WC = Wild card
- LL = Lucky loser
- Alt = Alternate
- ITF = ITF entry
- PR = Protected ranking
- SR = Special ranking
- SE = Special exempt
- JE = Junior exempt
- JR = Junior Accelerator Programme entrant
- CO = College Accelerator Programme entrant
- NG = Next Gen Accelerator Program entrant
- w/o = Walkover
- r = Retired
- d = Defaulted

=== Finals ===
Semifinals
1 | (Sweden) Stefan Edberg | 7 | 6
3/WC | (Ecuador) Andrés Gómez | 5 | 3
4 | (United States) Brad Gilbert | 6 | 6
(United States) Scott Davis | 3 | 4

Final
1 | (Sweden) Stefan Edberg | 6 | 6
4 | (United States) Brad Gilbert | 1 | 1

=== Top half ===
==== Section 1 ====
First round
(Czechoslovakia) M Šrejber | 6 | 7
Q | (United States) J Ross | 4 | 6
Q | (United States) R Seguso | 6 | 4 | 4
(Canada) A Sznajder | 4 | 6 | 6
Q | (South Africa) M Ondruska | 6 | 4 | 7
16 | (Czechoslovakia) P Korda | 3 | 6 | 5
10 | (United States) P Sampras | 7 | 6
WC | (United States) D Pate | 6 | 4
(United States) J Pugh | 3 | 7 | 6
(Australia) M Kratzmann | 6 | 5 | 0
(Israel) A Mansdorf | 6 | 6
(Austria) A Antonitsch | 4 | 1

Second round
1 | (Sweden) S Edberg | 6 | 6 | 6
(Czechoslovakia) M Šrejber | 4 | 7 | 4
(Canada) A Sznajder | 6 | 4 | 6
Q | (South Africa) M Ondruska | 3 | 6 | 4
10 | (United States) P Sampras | 6 | 1 | 7
(United States) J Pugh | 1 | 6 | 6
(Israel) A Mansdorf | 0 | 4
7 | (United States) M Chang | 6 | 6

Third round
1 | (Sweden) S Edberg | 6 | 6
(Canada) A Sznajder | 1 | 0
10 | (United States) P Sampras | 5 | 4
7 | (United States) M Chang | 7 | 6

Quarterfinals
1 | (Sweden) S Edberg | 3 | 6 | 6
7 | (United States) M Chang | 6 | 3 | 4

==== Section 2 ====
First round
(United States) P Chamberlin | 4 | 4
(United States) D Goldie | 6 | 6
(Canada) G Connell | 4 | 6 | 3
(Sweden) M Wilander | 6 | 3 | 6
(Australia) D Cahill | 1 | 6 | 7
14 | (United States) T Mayotte | 6 | 4 | 5
11 | (United States) J Courier | 6 | 6 | 6
(United States) K Jones | 3 | 7 | 3
(Sweden) T Högstedt | 2 | 6 | 4
WC | (Australia) J Stoltenberg | 6 | 3 | 6
Q | (Venezuela) N Pereira | 6 | 6
Q | (Italy) G Pozzi | 1 | 3

Second round
3/WC | (Ecuador) A Gómez | 6 | 7
(United States) D Goldie | 3 | 6
(Sweden) M Wilander | 3 | 2
(Australia) D Cahill | 6 | 6
11 | (United States) J Courier | 6 | 2 | 7
WC | (Australia) J Stoltenberg | 2 | 6 | 6
Q | (Venezuela) N Pereira | 2 | 7 | 4
6 | (United States) J Berger | 6 | 6 | 6

Third round
3/WC | (Ecuador) A Gómez | 7 | 6
(Australia) D Cahill | 6 | 3
11 | (United States) J Courier | 6 | 6
6 | (United States) J Berger | 2 | 2

Quarterfinals
3/WC | (Ecuador) A Gómez | 6 | 6
11 | (United States) J Courier | 1 | 4

=== Bottom half ===
==== Section 3 ====
First round
Q | (Sweden) J Carlsson | 7 | 7
(France) T Champion | 6 | 5
(Finland) A Rahunen | 6 | 7 | 1
(United States) J Arias | 7 | 6 | 6
(Switzerland) J Hlasek | 6 | 4 | 7
12 | (Sweden) J Svensson | 4 | 6 | 5
13 | (France) G Forget | 6 | 6
(United States) K Curren | 3 | 4
(United States) T Witsken | 6 | 6
Q | (Australia) T Woodbridge | 2 | 4
WC | (United States) L Shiras | 4 | 6
(United States) D Wheaton | 6 | 7

Second round
5 | (United States) A Krickstein | 6 | 7
Q | (Sweden) J Carlsson | 2 | 6
(United States) J Arias | 6 | 2 | 3
(Switzerland) J Hlasek | 3 | 6 | 6
13 | (France) G Forget | 4 | 6 | 6
(United States) T Witsken | 6 | 3 | 3
(United States) D Wheaton | 3 | 2
4 | (United States) B Gilbert | 6 | 6

Third round
5 | (United States) A Krickstein | 4 | 2
(Switzerland) J Hlasek | 6 | 6
13 | (France) G Forget | 2 | 1
4 | (United States) B Gilbert | 6 | 6

Quarterfinals
(Switzerland) J Hlasek | 6 | 1 | 5
4 | (United States) B Gilbert | 2 | 6 | 7

==== Section 4 ====
First round
(France) J-P Fleurian | 6 | 3 | 6
(South Africa) C van Rensburg | 3 | 6 | 3
(South Africa) G Muller | 6 | 1 | 1
(United States) S Davis | 2 | 6 | 6
(India) R Krishnan | 4 | 7 | 2
9 | (Soviet Union) A Chesnokov | 6 | 6 | 6
15 | (Australia) R Fromberg | 3 | 6 | 6
(Czechoslovakia) K Nováček | 6 | 4 | 4
WC | (United States) J Rive | 7 | 3 | 6
(United Kingdom) J Bates | 5 | 6 | 4
(United States) R Reneberg | 6 | 6
(United States) G Layendecker | 3 | 2

Second round
8 | (United States) J McEnroe | 7 | 6
(France) J-P Fleurian | 6 | 2
(United States) S Davis | 6 | 6
9 | (Soviet Union) A Chesnokov | 3 | 2
15 | (Australia) R Fromberg | 6 | 6
WC | (United States) J Rive | 3 | 2
(United States) R Reneberg | 4 | 3
2 | (United States) A Agassi | 6 | 6

Third round
8 | (United States) J McEnroe | 3 | 7 | 4
(United States) S Davis | 6 | 5 | 6
15 | (Australia) R Fromberg | 6 | 3 | 6
2 | (United States) A Agassi | 4 | 6 | 3

Quarterfinals
(United States) S Davis | 4 | 6 | 7^{7}
15 | (Australia) R Fromberg | 6 | 4 | 6^{3}
