= 1985 Mercedes Cup – Singles =

Singles
- 1985 Mercedes Cup

Final
- Champion: (Czechoslovakia) Ivan Lendl
- Runner-up: (United States) Brad Gilbert
- Score: 6–4, 6–0

Details
- Draw: 32 (3WC/4Q)
- Seeds: 8

Events
Singles	Doubles
- Stuttgart Open

Henri Leconte was the defending champion, but chose to rest after reaching the final of the US Open in doubles, alongside Yannick Noah.

Ivan Lendl won the title by defeating Brad Gilbert 6–4, 6–0 in the final.

== Seeds ==
1. (Czechoslovakia) Ivan Lendl (champion)
2. (Czechoslovakia) Tomáš Šmíd (semifinals)
3. (United States) Brad Gilbert (final)
4. (Argentina) José Luis Clerc (semifinals)
5. (Sweden) Jan Gunnarsson (quarterfinals)
6. (West Germany) Andreas Maurer (quarterfinals)
7. (United States) Terry Moor (first round)
8. (West Germany) Hans Schwaier (second round)

== Draw ==
Key

- Q = Qualifier
- WC = Wild card
- LL = Lucky loser
- Alt = Alternate
- ITF = ITF entry
- PR = Protected ranking
- SR = Special ranking
- SE = Special exempt
- JE = Junior exempt
- JR = Junior Accelerator Programme entrant
- CO = College Accelerator Programme entrant
- NG = Next Gen Accelerator Program entrant
- w/o = Walkover
- r = Retired
- d = Defaulted

=== Finals ===
Semifinals
1	(Czechoslovakia) Ivan Lendl	6	6
4	(Argentina) José Luis Clerc	2	2
3	(United States) Brad Gilbert	6	4	7
2	(Czechoslovakia) Tomáš Šmíd	4	6	5

Final
1	(Czechoslovakia) Ivan Lendl	6	6
3	(United States) Brad Gilbert	4	0

=== Top half ===
First round
1	(Czechoslovakia) I Lendl	6	6
(United States) L Duncan	1	1
(India) V Amritraj	6	3	6
WC	(United States) D Gitlin	4	6	0
(West Germany) D Keretić	5	3
(Haiti) R Agénor	7	6
(Spain) J Higueras	6	6
7	(United States) T Moor	4	2
4	(Argentina) JL Clerc	6	6
Q	(West Germany) I Werner	3	1
(United States) B Teacher	1
(Hungary) B Taróczy	0^{r}
WC	(West Germany) M Westphal	4	7	6
Q	(West Germany) J Becka	6	6	0
(United States) S Mayer	6	6	1
5	(Sweden) J Gunnarsson	7	3	6

Second round
1	(Czechoslovakia) I Lendl	6	6
(India) V Amritraj	3	2
(Haiti) R Agénor	6	6
(Spain) J Higueras	3	3
4	(Argentina) JL Clerc	6	6
(United States) B Teacher	2	1
WC	(West Germany) M Westphal	6	6	2
5	(Sweden) J Gunnarsson	7	4	6

Quarterfinals
1	(Czechoslovakia) I Lendl	6	6
(Haiti) R Agénor	1	3
4	(Argentina) JL Clerc	6	6
5	(Sweden) J Gunnarsson	3	3

Semifinals
1	(Czechoslovakia) I Lendl	6	6
4	(Argentina) JL Clerc	2	2

=== Bottom half ===
First round
6	(West Germany) A Maurer	6	6
(Argentina) A Ganzabal	4	1
(United States) To Gullikson	2	5
(United States) M Mitchell	6	7
Q	(United States) Ti Gullikson	6	2	3
(Spain) J Aguilera	4	6	6
(Australia) B Drewett	2	6
3	(United States) B Gilbert	6	7
8	(West Germany) H Schwaier	6	2	6
(United States) J Lapidus	4	6	2
(Paraguay) V Pecci	3	4
Q	(West Germany) U Riglewski	6	6
(United States) M Davis	6	6	5
(Argentina) H de la Peña	0	7	7
WC	(West Germany) T Meinecke	6	3	4
2	(Czechoslovakia) T Šmíd	4	6	6

Second round
6	(West Germany) A Maurer	6	4	6
(United States) M Mitchell	3	6	1
(Spain) J Aguilera	6	3
3	(United States) B Gilbert	7	6
8	(West Germany) H Schwaier	2	2
Q	(West Germany) U Riglewski	6	6
(Argentina) H de la Peña	4	4
2	(Czechoslovakia) T Šmíd	6	6

Quarterfinals
6	(West Germany) A Maurer	0	3
3	(United States) B Gilbert	6	6
Q	(West Germany) U Riglewski	5	6
2	(Czechoslovakia) T Šmíd	7	7

Semifinals
3	(United States) B Gilbert	6	4	7
2	(Czechoslovakia) T Šmíd	4	6	5
