= 1989 Suntory Japan Open Tennis Championships – Men's doubles =

Men's doubles
- 1989 Suntory Japan Open Tennis Championships

Final
- Champions: (United States) Ken Flach; (United States) Robert Seguso
- Runners-up: (United States) Kevin Curren; (United States) David Pate
- Score: 7–6, 7–6

Details
- Draw: 28
- Seeds: 8

Events
Singles	men	women
Doubles	men	women
- Japan Open

John Fitzgerald and Johan Kriek were the defending champions but only Fitzgerald competed that year with Anders Järryd.

Fitzgerald and Järryd lost in the second round to Tomas Nydahl and Olli Rahnasto.

Ken Flach and Robert Seguso won in the final 7–6, 7–6 against Kevin Curren and David Pate.

== Seeds ==
The top four seeded teams received byes into the second round.

1. (United States) Rick Leach / (United States) Jim Pugh (quarterfinals)
2. (Australia) John Fitzgerald / (Sweden) Anders Järryd (second round)
3. (United States) Ken Flach / (United States) Robert Seguso (champions)
4. (United States) Kevin Curren / (United States) David Pate (final)
5. (United States) Scott Davis / (United States) Jim Grabb (quarterfinals)
6. (Canada) Grant Connell / (Canada) Glenn Michibata (quarterfinals)
7. (United States) Martin Davis / (Australia) Brad Drewett (first round)
8. (United Kingdom) Andrew Castle / (United States) Robert Van't Hof (semifinals)

== Draw ==
Key

- Q = Qualifier
- WC = Wild card
- LL = Lucky loser
- Alt = Alternate
- ITF = ITF entry
- PR = Protected ranking
- SR = Special ranking
- SE = Special exempt
- JE = Junior exempt
- JR = Junior Accelerator Programme entrant
- CO = College Accelerator Programme entrant
- NG = Next Gen Accelerator Program entrant
- w/o = Walkover
- r = Retired
- d = Defaulted

=== Final ===
Semifinals

Final

8
- (United Kingdom) Andrew Castle
- (United States) Robert Van't Hof
4
6
3

4
- (United States) Kevin Curren
- (United States) David Pate
6
3
6

4
- (United States) Kevin Curren
- (United States) David Pate
6
6

3
- (United States) Ken Flach
- (United States) Robert Seguso
7
7

3
- (United States) Ken Flach
- (United States) Robert Seguso
6
6

- (United Kingdom) Jeremy Bates
- (Australia) Broderick Dyke
4
4

=== Top half ===
First round

Second round

Quarterfinals

Semifinals

1
- (United States) R Leach
- (United States) J Pugh
6
6

- (The Bahamas) R Smith
- (Kenya) P Wekesa
4
7
7

- (The Bahamas) R Smith
- (Kenya) P Wekesa
4
4

- (United States) J Letts
- (United States) B Man-Son-Hing
6
6
6

1
- (United States) R Leach
- (United States) J Pugh
6
4

- (United States) K Jones
- (United States) J Rive
6
7
6

8
- (United Kingdom) A Castle
- (United States) R Van't Hof
7
6

- (United States) L Shiras
- (Czechoslovakia) M Šrejber
7
6
7

- (United States) L Shiras
- (Czechoslovakia) M Šrejber
4
4

- (New Zealand) S Guy
- (United States) L Scott
6
2

8
- (United Kingdom) A Castle
- (United States) R Van't Hof
6
6

8
- (United Kingdom) A Castle
- (United States) R Van't Hof
7
6

8
- (United Kingdom) A Castle
- (United States) R Van't Hof
4
6
3

4
- (United States) K Curren
- (United States) D Pate
6
3
6

4
- (United States) K Curren
- (United States) D Pate
6
6

- (United States) D Goldie
- (United States) G Van Emburgh
4
6
6

- (United States) D Goldie
- (United States) G Van Emburgh
4
2

- (United States) R Baxter
- (France) J-P Fleurian
6
3
3

4
- (United States) K Curren
- (United States) D Pate
6
6

- (United States) G Layendecker
- (Israel) A Mansdorf
3
6
6

5
- (United States) S Davis
- (United States) J Grabb
4
4

- (Ecuador) A Gómez
- (Venezuela) N Pereira
6
4
7

- (Ecuador) A Gómez
- (Venezuela) N Pereira
6
6
6

- (United States) P Chamberlin
- (West Germany) C Saceanu
4
5

5
- (United States) S Davis
- (United States) J Grabb
3
7
7

5
- (United States) S Davis
- (United States) J Grabb
6
7

=== Bottom half ===
First round

Second round

Quarterfinals

Semifinals

6
- (Canada) G Connell
- (Canada) G Michibata
4
6
6

- (Australia) W Masur
- (Australia) J Stoltenberg
6
1
4

6
- (Canada) G Connell
- (Canada) G Michibata
6
6

- (Czechoslovakia) I Lendl
- (United States) B Scanlon
6
7

- (Czechoslovakia) I Lendl
- (United States) B Scanlon
1
2

- (India) Z Ali
- (United States) J Canter
3
5

6
- (Canada) G Connell
- (Canada) G Michibata
4
4

- (Australia) P Cash
- (United States) J McEnroe
6
6

3
- (United States) K Flach
- (United States) R Seguso
6
6

- (Japan) H Shirato
- (Japan) E Takeuchi
0
2

- (Australia) P Cash
- (United States) J McEnroe

3
- (United States) K Flach
- (United States) R Seguso
w/o

3
- (United States) K Flach
- (United States) R Seguso
6
6

7
- (United States) M Davis
- (Australia) B Drewett
4
4

- (United Kingdom) J Bates
- (Australia) B Dyke
4
4

- (United Kingdom) J Bates
- (Australia) B Dyke
6
6

- (United Kingdom) J Bates
- (Australia) B Dyke
4
7
7

- (United States) M Anger
- (New Zealand) K Evernden
7
6

- (United States) M Anger
- (New Zealand) K Evernden
6
5
6

- (United States) T Pawsat
- (Sweden) T Svantesson
6
2

- (United Kingdom) J Bates
- (Australia) B Dyke
6
6

- (Sweden) T Nydahl
- (Finland) O Rahnasto
2
6
6

- (Sweden) T Nydahl
- (Finland) O Rahnasto
2
2

- (Japan) H Nakano
- (Japan) S Ota
6
3
3

- (Sweden) T Nydahl
- (Finland) O Rahnasto
6
6

2
- (Australia) J Fitzgerald
- (Sweden) A Järryd
4
4
