= 1989 Suntory Japan Open Tennis Championships =

- Date: 17–23 April
- Edition: 16th
- Category: Grand Prix (ATP); Category 2 (WTA)
- Prize money: $425,000 (ATP) $100,000 (WTA)
- Surface: Hard / outdoor
- Location: Tokyo, Japan
- Venue: Ariake Coliseum

Champions

Men's singles
- (Sweden) Stefan Edberg

Women's singles
- (Japan) Kumiko Okamoto

Men's doubles
- (United States) Ken Flach / (United States) Robert Seguso

Women's doubles
- (Canada) Jill Hetherington / (Australia) Elizabeth Smylie
- Japan Open

The 1989 Suntory Japan Open Tennis Championships was a tennis tournament played on outdoor hard courts at the Ariake Coliseum in Tokyo, Japan that was part of the 1989 Nabisco Grand Prix and of Category 2 tier of the 1989 WTA Tour. It was the 16th edition of the tournament and was held from 17 April through 23 April 1989. The men's singles and doubles finals were rescheduled from Sunday to Monday, 24 April due to rain. Stefan Edberg and Kumiko Okamoto won the singles titles.

== Finals ==
=== Men's singles ===
(Sweden) Stefan Edberg defeated (Czechoslovakia) Ivan Lendl 6–3, 2–6, 6–4

- It was Edberg's 1st singles title of the year and the 19th of his career.

=== Women's singles ===
(Japan) Kumiko Okamoto defeated (Australia) Elizabeth Smylie 6–4, 6–2

- It was Okamoto's only singles title of the year and the 1st of her career.

=== Men's doubles ===
(United States) Ken Flach / (United States) Robert Seguso defeated (United States) Kevin Curren / (United States) David Pate 7–6, 7–6

- It was Flach's 1st title of the year and the 25th of his career. It was Seguso's 1st title of the year and the 25th of his career.

=== Women's doubles ===
(Canada) Jill Hetherington / (Australia) Elizabeth Smylie defeated (United States) Ann Henricksson / (United States) Beth Herr 6–1, 6–3

- It was Hetherington's 3rd title of the year and the 9th of her career. It was Smylie's 3rd title of the year and the 24th of her career.
