= 1990 Suntory Japan Open Tennis Championships – Men's singles =

Men's singles
- 1990 Suntory Japan Open Tennis Championships

Final
- Champion: (Sweden) Stefan Edberg
- Runner-up: (United States) Aaron Krickstein
- Score: 6–4, 7–5

Details
- Draw: 56 (7Q / 5WC)
- Seeds: 16

Events
Singles	men	women
Doubles	men	women
- Japan Open

Second-seeded Stefan Edberg was the defending champion, and won the title again defeating Aaron Krickstein in the final 6–4, 7–5.

== Seeds ==
The top eight seeds received a bye into the second round.

1. (Czechoslovakia) Ivan Lendl (semifinals)
2. (Sweden) Stefan Edberg (champion)
3. (United States) Brad Gilbert (semifinals)
4. (United States) Aaron Krickstein (final)
5. (United States) Michael Chang (quarterfinals)
6. (Australia) Wally Masur (quarterfinals)
7. (United States) Jim Grabb (quarterfinals)
8. (United States) Scott Davis (third round)
9. (Australia) Mark Kratzmann (third round)
10. (Israel) Amos Mansdorf (quarterfinals)
11. (New Zealand) Kelly Evernden (first round)
12. (United States) Paul Chamberlin (second round)
13. (Czechoslovakia) Milan Šrejber (second round)
14. (Sweden) Thomas Högstedt (second round)
15. (Austria) Alex Antonitsch (third round)
16. (United States) Dan Goldie (second round)

== Draw ==
Key

- Q = Qualifier
- WC = Wild card
- LL = Lucky loser
- Alt = Alternate
- ITF = ITF entry
- PR = Protected ranking
- SR = Special ranking
- SE = Special exempt
- JE = Junior exempt
- JR = Junior Accelerator Programme entrant
- CO = College Accelerator Programme entrant
- NG = Next Gen Accelerator Program entrant
- w/o = Walkover
- r = Retired
- d = Defaulted

=== Finals ===
Quarterfinals
1	(Czechoslovakia) Ivan Lendl	6	6
10	(Israel) Amos Mansdorf	4	2
4	(United States) Aaron Krickstein	7	6
5	(United States) Michael Chang	6	1
6	(Australia) Wally Masur	1	6
3	(United States) Brad Gilbert	6	7
7	(United States) Jim Grabb	3	3
2	(Sweden) Stefan Edberg	6	6

Semifinals
1	(Czechoslovakia) Ivan Lendl	3	7	4
4	(United States) Aaron Krickstein	6	5	6
3	(United States) Brad Gilbert	1	6
2	(Sweden) Stefan Edberg	6	7

Final
4	(United States) Aaron Krickstein	4	5
2	(Sweden) Stefan Edberg	6	7

=== Top half ===
==== Section 1 ====
First round
WC	(Japan) S Matsuoka	6	6
Q	(United Kingdom) A Castle	2	3
(Netherlands) T Nijssen	5	0^{r}
Q	(United States) J Russell	7	0
LL	(New Zealand) B Derlin	4	1
16	(United States) D Goldie	6	6
10	(Israel) A Mansdorf	6	6
Q	(United States) C Garner	2	2
(Australia) S Youl	3	4
Q	(New Zealand) D Lewis	6	6
(Socialist Federal Republic of Yugoslavia) S Živojinović	6	6
(Australia) B Drewett	1	1

Second round
1	(Czechoslovakia) I Lendl	6	6
WC	(Japan) S Matsuoka	4	2
Q	(United States) J Russell	6	6
16	(United States) D Goldie	4	3
10	(Israel) A Mansdorf	6	7
Q	(New Zealand) D Lewis	3	5
(Socialist Federal Republic of Yugoslavia) S Živojinović	3	6
8	(United States) S Davis	6	7

Third round
1	(Czechoslovakia) I Lendl	7	6
Q	(United States) J Russell	6	2
10	(Israel) A Mansdorf	7	6	6
8	(United States) S Davis	6	7	2

Quarterfinals
1	(Czechoslovakia) I Lendl	6	6
10	(Israel) A Mansdorf	4	2

==== Section 2 ====
First round
WC	(Japan) T Tsuchihashi	2	3
(United States) David Pate	6	6
(Canada) G Connell	6	6
WC	(Japan) H Tanizawa	3	2
(West Germany) P Vojtischek	6	3
14	(Sweden) T Högstedt	7	6
11	(New Zealand) K Evernden	6	3
(West Germany) P Kühnen	7	6
(United States) R Matuszewski	4	6	5
(Australia) T Woodbridge	6	4	7
(United States) K Jones	6	7
(West Germany) C Saceanu	2	6

Second round
4	(United States) A Krickstein	6	7
(United States) David Pate	4	6
(Canada) G Connell	6	7
14	(Sweden) T Högstedt	4	6
(West Germany) P Kühnen	3	6	6
(Australia) T Woodbridge	6	2	3
(United States) K Jones	6	0	1
5	(United States) M Chang	1	6	6

Third round
4	(United States) A Krickstein	6	6
(Canada) G Connell	3	2
(West Germany) P Kühnen	5	2
5	(United States) M Chang	7	6

Quarterfinals
4	(United States) A Krickstein	7	6
5	(United States) M Chang	6	1

=== Bottom half ===
==== Section 3 ====
First round
(Sweden) J Carlsson	6	6
(United States) J Tarango	2	3
(Venezuela) N Pereira	2	6
Q	(United States) P McEnroe	6	7
(Israel) G Bloom	6	5
12	(United States) P Chamberlin	7	7
13	(Czechoslovakia) M Šrejber	6	6
WC	(Japan) K Masuda	2	4
(West Germany) A Mronz	6	7
(Canada) M Laurendeau	3	5
(Sweden) L Wahlgren	1	0
(United States) B Pearce	6	6

Second round
6	(Australia) W Masur	6	6
(Sweden) J Carlsson	1	0
Q	(United States) P McEnroe	3	6	7
12	(United States) P Chamberlin	6	3	5
13	(Czechoslovakia) M Šrejber	6	3	3
(West Germany) A Mronz	4	6	6
(United States) B Pearce	6	1	0
3	(United States) B Gilbert	1	6	6

Third round
6	(Australia) W Masur	6	7
Q	(United States) P McEnroe	2	6
(West Germany) A Mronz	6	5	1
3	(United States) B Gilbert	4	7	6

Quarterfinals
6	(Australia) W Masur	1	6
3	(United States) B Gilbert	6	7

==== Section 4 ====
First round
(United States) J Rive	1	6	6
(Puerto Rico) M Nido	6	3	4
Q	(United Kingdom) D Sapsford	6	6	4
LL	(United States) J Canter	4	7	6
WC	(Australia) P Cash	4	7	4
9	(Australia) M Kratzmann	6	6	6
15	(Austria) A Antonitsch	7	5	6
(Australia) J Stoltenberg	6	7	2
(Sweden) A Järryd	6	6
(United States) D Cassidy	0	3
(United States) L Shiras	6	6	6
Q	(United States) B Garnett	7	4	1

Second round
7	(United States) J Grabb	6	6
(United States) J Rive	1	4
LL	(United States) J Canter	6	2	4
9	(Australia) M Kratzmann	1	6	6
15	(Austria) A Antonitsch	6	7
(Sweden) A Järryd	2	6
(United States) L Shiras	0	2
2	(Sweden) S Edberg	6	6

Third round
7	(United States) J Grabb	6	6
9	(Australia) M Kratzmann	4	2
15	(Austria) A Antonitsch	2	7	1
2	(Sweden) S Edberg	6	6	6

Quarterfinals
7	(United States) J Grabb	3	3
2	(Sweden) S Edberg	6	6
