= 1988 Suntory Japan Open Tennis Championships – Men's singles =

Men's singles
- 1988 Suntory Japan Open Tennis Championships

Final
- Champion: (United States) John McEnroe
- Runner-up: (Sweden) Stefan Edberg
- Score: 6–2, 6–2

Details
- Draw: 56 (7Q / 5WC)
- Seeds: 16

Events
Singles	men	women
Doubles	men	women
- Japan Open

Stefan Edberg was the defending champion but lost in the final to John McEnroe 2–6, 2–6.

== Seeds ==
The top eight seeds received a bye into the second round.

1. (Sweden) Stefan Edberg (final)
2. (Czechoslovakia) Miloslav Mečíř (third round)
3. (United States) Tim Mayotte (semifinals)
4. (United States) Brad Gilbert (semifinals)
5. (United States) David Pate (quarterfinals)
6. (Sweden) Mikael Pernfors (quarterfinals)
7. (United States) John McEnroe (champion)
8. (United States) Aaron Krickstein (third round)
9. (United States) Eliot Teltscher (second round)
10. (Australia) John Frawley (first round)
11. (United States) Dan Goldie (third round)
12. (United States) Johan Kriek (third round)
13. (United States) Jim Grabb (second round)
14. (United States) Joey Rive (first round)
15. (United States) Scott Davis (third round)
16. (United Kingdom) Jeremy Bates (first round)

== Draw ==
Key

- Q = Qualifier
- WC = Wild card
- LL = Lucky loser
- Alt = Alternate
- ITF = ITF entry
- PR = Protected ranking
- SR = Special ranking
- SE = Special exempt
- JE = Junior exempt
- JR = Junior Accelerator Programme entrant
- CO = College Accelerator Programme entrant
- NG = Next Gen Accelerator Program entrant
- w/o = Walkover
- r = Retired
- d = Defaulted

=== Finals ===
Quarterfinals
1	(Sweden) Stefan Edberg	6	6
(Australia) Brad Drewett	4	3
3	(United States) Tim Mayotte	6	6
6	(Sweden) Mikael Pernfors	3	4
5	(United States) David Pate	3	2
4	(United States) Brad Gilbert	6	6
7	(United States) John McEnroe	7	7
(Japan) Shuzo Matsuoka	6	6

Semifinals
1	(Sweden) Stefan Edberg	6	6
3	(United States) Tim Mayotte	2	2
4	(United States) Brad Gilbert	3	6	4
7	(United States) John McEnroe	6	0	6

Final
1	(Sweden) Stefan Edberg	2	2
7	(United States) John McEnroe	6	6

=== Top half ===
==== Section 1 ====
First round
(United States) M Anger	6	7
(United States) T Nelson	3	5
(United States) J Levine	4	4
WC	(Japan) T Fukui	6	6
(Germany) D Keretić	6	4	4
15	(United States) S Davis	3	6	6
9	(United States) E Teltscher	6	6
(United States) M Keil	3	3
(Australia) B Drewett	6	6
WC	(Japan) S Ota	1	0
(United States) K Jones	6	7
(Germany) A Mronz	4	6

Second round
1	(Sweden) S Edberg	6	6
(United States) M Anger	2	2
WC	(Japan) T Fukui	3	3
15	(United States) S Davis	6	6
9	(United States) E Teltscher	4	3
(Australia) B Drewett	6	6
(United States) K Jones	6	5	3
8	(United States) A Krickstein	4	7	6

Third round
1	(Sweden) S Edberg	6	7
15	(United States) S Davis	2	5
(Australia) B Drewett	6	2	7
8	(United States) A Krickstein	4	6	6

Quarterfinals
1	(Sweden) S Edberg	6	6
(Australia) B Drewett	4	3

==== Section 2 ====
First round
(United States) L Scott	6	0
Q	(United States) J Letts	7	6
Q	(United States) A Kohlberg	7	4	4
Q	(Australia) K Warwick	6	6	6
(United Kingdom) S Shaw	6	6
14	(United States) J Rive	4	2
11	(United States) D Goldie	6	7
(United States) R Saad	3	5
Q	(United States) P Palandjian	6	4
(Germany) W Popp	7	6
(Australia) M Kratzmann	3	0
(United Kingdom) A Castle	6	6

Second round
3	(United States) T Mayotte	6	6
Q	(United States) J Letts	4	2
Q	(Australia) K Warwick	4	5
(United Kingdom) S Shaw	6	7
11	(United States) D Goldie	6	6
(Germany) W Popp	3	4
(United Kingdom) A Castle	4	4
6	(Sweden) M Pernfors	6	6

Third round
3	(United States) T Mayotte	7	6
(United Kingdom) S Shaw	6	4
11	(United States) D Goldie	2	4
6	(Sweden) M Pernfors	6	6

Quarterfinals
3	(United States) T Mayotte	6	6
6	(Sweden) M Pernfors	3	4

=== Bottom half ===
==== Section 3 ====
First round
Q	(United States) T Pawsat	6	6	6
(United States) B Pearce	3	7	3
(Sweden) J Carlsson	2	4
(The Bahamas) R Smith	6	6
(Germany) P Baur	2	4
12	(United States) J Kriek	6	6
13	(United States) J Grabb	6	6
Q	(United States) J DeFoor	2	4
(United States) J Ross	6	0
Q	(United States) R Van't Hof	7	6
(United States) L Shiras	7	6
(United States) P Chamberlin	6	0

Second round
5	(United States) D Pate	6	6
Q	(United States) T Pawsat	1	2
(The Bahamas) R Smith	5	4
12	(United States) J Kriek	7	6
13	(United States) J Grabb	2	1
Q	(United States) R Van't Hof	6	6
(United States) L Shiras	2	3
4	(United States) B Gilbert	6	6

Third round
5	(United States) D Pate	4	7	6
12	(United States) J Kriek	6	6	4
Q	(United States) R Van't Hof	4	2
4	(United States) B Gilbert	6	6

Quarterfinals
5	(United States) D Pate	3	2
4	(United States) B Gilbert	6	6

==== Section 4 ====
First round
(Nigeria) N Odizor	6	6	2
(United States) G Holmes	7	4	6
WC	(Japan) K Kiyomiya	2	1
(Australia) S Youl	6	6
(United States) D Rostagno	7	3	6
10	(Australia) J Frawley	6	6	3
16	(United Kingdom) J Bates	6	4	5
(United States) J Canter	4	6	7
WC	(Japan) T Tsuchihashi	2	3
(Japan) S Matsuoka	6	6
(Germany) P Moraing	6	7	4
(United States) B Scanlon	7	5	6

Second round
7	(United States) J McEnroe	6	6
(United States) G Holmes	3	4
(Australia) S Youl	1	3
(United States) D Rostagno	6	6
(United States) J Canter	2	4
(Japan) S Matsuoka	6	6
(United States) B Scanlon	2	6	5
2/WC	(Czechoslovakia) M Mečíř	6	1	7

Third round
7	(United States) J McEnroe	6	6
(United States) D Rostagno	2	3
(Japan) S Matsuoka	7	6
2/WC	(Czechoslovakia) M Mečíř	6	3

Quarterfinals
7	(United States) J McEnroe	7	7
(Japan) S Matsuoka	6	6
