= 1985 Mercedes Cup – Doubles =

Doubles
- 1985 Mercedes Cup

Final
- Champions: (Czechoslovakia) Ivan Lendl (Czechoslovakia) Tomáš Šmíd
- Runners-up: (United States) Andy Kohlberg (Brazil) João Soares
- Score: 3–6, 6–4, 6–2

Details
- Draw: 16 (1WC)
- Seeds: 4

Events
Singles	Doubles
- Stuttgart Open

Andreas Maurer and Sandy Mayer were the defending champions, but lost in the quarterfinals to Andy Kohlberg and João Soares.

Ivan Lendl and Tomáš Šmíd won the title by defeating Kohlberg and Soares 3–6, 6–4, 6–2 in the final.

== Seeds ==
1. (Czechoslovakia) Ivan Lendl / (Czechoslovakia) Tomáš Šmíd (champions)
2. (United States) Steve Meister / (United States) Blaine Willenborg (quarterfinals)
3. (West Germany) Andreas Maurer / (United States) Sandy Mayer (quarterfinals)
4. (United States) Drew Gitlin / (United States) Matt Mitchell (semifinals)

== Draw ==
Key

- Q = Qualifier
- WC = Wild card
- LL = Lucky loser
- Alt = Alternate
- ITF = ITF entry
- PR = Protected ranking
- SR = Special ranking
- SE = Special exempt
- JE = Junior exempt
- JR = Junior Accelerator Programme entrant
- CO = College Accelerator Programme entrant
- NG = Next Gen Accelerator Program entrant
- w/o = Walkover
- r = Retired
- d = Defaulted

=== Draw ===
First round
1	(Czechoslovakia) I Lendl (Czechoslovakia) T Šmíd	6	6
(India) A Amritraj (Paraguay) V Pecci	3	3
(West Germany) D Keretić (West Germany) U Riglewski	3	5
WC	(United States) E Fromm (Australia) D Graham	6	7
4	(United States) D Gitlin (United States) M Mitchell	6	6
(Brazil) C Kirmayr (Brazil) C Motta	4	3
(United States) M Davis (United States) C Dunk	6	4	6
(Australia) B Drewett (Australia) M Fancutt	2	6	1
(United States) Ti Gullikson (United States) To Gullikson	4	6	3
(United States) A Kohlberg (Brazil) J Soares	6	1	6
(United States) R Meyer (United States) F Taygan	7	3	3
3	(West Germany) A Maurer (United States) S Mayer	5	6	6
(United States) L Bourne (Hungary) Z Kuhárszky	6	6
(United States) G Donnelly (United States) B Walts	3	3
(Sweden) P Svensson (West Germany) I Werner	7	3	4
2	(United States) S Meister (United States) B Willenborg	6	6	6

Quarterfinals
1	(Czechoslovakia) I Lendl (Czechoslovakia) T Šmíd	6	6
WC	(United States) E Fromm (Australia) D Graham	1	1
4	(United States) D Gitlin (United States) M Mitchell	6	6
(United States) M Davis (United States) C Dunk	4	4
(United States) A Kohlberg (Brazil) J Soares	6	6	6
3	(West Germany) A Maurer (United States) S Mayer	7	4	2
(United States) L Bourne (Hungary) Z Kuhárszky	2	6	6
2	(United States) S Meister (United States) B Willenborg	6	3	3

Semifinals
1	(Czechoslovakia) I Lendl (Czechoslovakia) T Šmíd	6	7
4	(United States) D Gitlin (United States) M Mitchell	3	6
(United States) A Kohlberg (Brazil) J Soares	4	6	6
(United States) L Bourne (Hungary) Z Kuhárszky	6	1	3

Final
1	(Czechoslovakia) I Lendl (Czechoslovakia) T Šmíd	3	6	6
(United States) A Kohlberg (Brazil) J Soares	6	4	2
