= 1990 Suntory Japan Open Tennis Championships =

- Date: 9–15 April
- Edition: 17th
- Category: Championship Series (ATP); Tier IV (WTA)
- Prize money: $825,000 (ATP) $150,000 (WTA)
- Surface: Hard / outdoor
- Location: Tokyo, Japan
- Venue: Ariake Coliseum

Champions

Men's singles
- (Sweden) Stefan Edberg

Women's singles
- (Sweden) Catarina Lindqvist

Men's doubles
- (Australia) Mark Kratzmann / (Australia) Wally Masur

Women's doubles
- (United States) Kathy Jordan / (Australia) Elizabeth Smylie
- Japan Open

The 1990 Suntory Japan Open Tennis Championships was a combined men's and women's tennis tournament played on outdoor hard courts at the Ariake Coliseum in Tokyo, Japan that was part of the Championship Series of the 1990 ATP Tour and of Tier IV category of the 1990 WTA Tour. It was the 16th edition of the tournament and was held from 9 April through 15 April 1990. Second-seeded Stefan Edberg and first-seeded Catarina Lindqvist won the singles titles.

== Finals ==
=== Men's singles ===
(Sweden) Stefan Edberg defeated (United States) Aaron Krickstein 6–4, 7–5

- It was Edberg's 2nd singles title of the year and the 22nd of his career.

=== Women's singles ===
(Sweden) Catarina Lindqvist defeated (Australia) Elizabeth Smylie 6–3, 6–2

- It was Lindqvist's only singles title of the year and the 4th of her career.

=== Men's doubles ===
(Australia) Mark Kratzmann / (Australia) Wally Masur defeated (United States) Kent Kinnear / (United States) Brad Pearce 3–6, 6–3, 6–4

- It was Kratzmann's 3rd doubles title of the year and the 11th of his career. It was Masur's 1st doubles title of the year and the 10th of his career.

=== Women's doubles ===
(United States) Kathy Jordan / (Australia) Elizabeth Smylie defeated (United States) Hu Na / (Australia) Michelle Jaggard 6–0, 3–6, 6–1

- It was Jordan's 2nd doubles title of the year and the 39th of her career. It was Smylie's 3rd doubles title of the year and the 27th of her career.
