= 1987 Suntory Japan Open Tennis Championships – Women's doubles =

Women's doubles
- 1987 Suntory Japan Open Tennis Championships

Final
- Champions: (United States) Kathy Jordan (United States) Betsy Nagelsen
- Runners-up: (United States) Sandy Collins (United States) Sharon Walsh-Pete
- Score: 6–3, 7–5

Details
- Draw: 16
- Seeds: 4

Events
Singles	men	women
Doubles	men	women
- Japan Open

Sandy Collins and Sharon Walsh-Pete were the defending champions, but lost in the final to Kathy Jordan and Betsy Nagelsen. The score was 6–3, 7–5.

== Seeds ==
1. (United States) Kathy Jordan / (United States) Betsy Nagelsen (champions)
2. (United States) Sandy Collins / (United States) Sharon Walsh-Pete (final)
3. (Hong Kong) Patricia Hy / (Japan) Etsuko Inoue (first round)
4. (Czechoslovakia) Iva Budařová / (Bulgaria) Katerina Maleeva (first round)

== Draw ==
Key

- Q = Qualifier
- WC = Wild card
- LL = Lucky loser
- Alt = Alternate
- ITF = ITF entry
- PR = Protected ranking
- SR = Special ranking
- SE = Special exempt
- JE = Junior exempt
- JR = Junior Accelerator Programme entrant
- CO = College Accelerator Programme entrant
- NG = Next Gen Accelerator Program entrant
- w/o = Walkover
- r = Retired
- d = Defaulted

=== Draw ===
First round
1	(United States) K Jordan (United States) B Nagelsen	6	6
(Sweden) C Karlsson (West Germany) C Porwik	4	1
(United States) AM Fernandez (New Zealand) J Richardson	6	6
(United States) B Gerken (United States) B Herr	4	2
4	(Czechoslovakia) I Budařová (Bulgaria) K Maleeva	7	6	4
(United Kingdom) A Hobbs (Switzerland) C Jolissaint	6	7	6
(Japan) E Iida (Japan) A Nishiya	2	1
(United States) L Antonoplis (Brazil) C Monteiro	6	6
(Australia) Jaggard (Australia) J Tremelling	7	6
(Australia) A Minter (Japan) M Yanagi	5	4
(United States) Ca MacGregor (United States) Cy MacGregor	7	6
3	(Hong Kong) P Hy (Japan) E Inoue	5	1
(Japan) A Kijimuta (Argentina) A Villagrán	4	6	6
(France) P Paradis (France) Nathalie Phan-Thanh	6	0	2
(New Zealand) B Cordwell (Australia) L Field	2	7	4
2	(United States) S Collins (United States) S Walsh-Pete	6	6	6

Quarterfinals
1	(United States) K Jordan (United States) B Nagelsen	6	7
(United States) AM Fernandez (New Zealand) J Richardson	3	6
(United Kingdom) A Hobbs (Switzerland) C Jolissaint	4	6	4
(United States) L Antonoplis (Brazil) C Monteiro	6	4	6
(Australia) Jaggard (Australia) J Tremelling	5	3
(United States) Ca MacGregor (United States) Cy MacGregor	7	6
(Japan) A Kijimuta (Argentina) A Villagrán	4	6	4
2	(United States) S Collins (United States) S Walsh-Pete	6	4	6

Semifinals
1	(United States) K Jordan (United States) B Nagelsen	7	6
(United States) L Antonoplis (Brazil) C Monteiro	5	4
(United States) Ca MacGregor (United States) Cy MacGregor	6	2
2	(United States) S Collins (United States) S Walsh-Pete	7	6

Final
1	(United States) K Jordan (United States) B Nagelsen	6	7
2	(United States) S Collins (United States) S Walsh-Pete	3	5
