= 1990 Suntory Japan Open Tennis Championships – Women's doubles =

Tennis event, part of the WTA Tour

Women's doubles
- 1990 Suntory Japan Open Tennis Championships

Final
- Champion: (United States) Kathy Jordan; (Australia) Elizabeth Smylie
- Runner-up: (United States) Hu Na; (Australia) Michelle Jaggard
- Score: 6–0, 3–6, 6–1

Details
- Draw: 16 (1Q / 1WC)
- Seeds: 4

Events
Singles	men	women
Doubles	men	women
- Japan Open

The 1990 Suntory Japan Open Tennis Championships women's doubles was a doubles event which was part of the seventeenth edition of the Japan Open; a tennis tournament held in Tokyo, Japan, played on hard. It was part of the 1990 season of the WTA Tour.

Jill Hetherington and Elizabeth Smylie were the defending champions, but competed this year with different partners.

Hetherington teamed up with Anne Minter and lost in the first round to Hu Na and Michelle Jaggard. Smylie teamed up with Kathy Jordan and successfully defended her title, defeating Hu Na and Jaggard 6–0, 3–6, 6–1 in the final.

== Seeds ==
1. (United States) Lori McNeil / (United States) Robin White (semifinals)
2. (United States) Kathy Jordan / (Australia) Elizabeth Smylie (champions)
3. (United States) Betsy Nagelsen / (West Germany) Eva Pfaff (quarterfinals)
4. (Canada) Jill Hetherington / (Australia) Anne Minter (first round)

== Draw ==
Key

- Q = Qualifier
- WC = Wild card
- LL = Lucky loser
- Alt = Alternate
- ITF = ITF entry
- PR = Protected ranking
- SR = Special ranking
- SE = Special exempt
- JE = Junior exempt
- JR = Junior Accelerator Programme entrant
- CO = College Accelerator Programme entrant
- NG = Next Gen Accelerator Program entrant
- w/o = Walkover
- r = Retired
- d = Defaulted

First round
1	(United States) L McNeil (United States) R White	6	7^{7}
WC	(Japan) E Inoue (Japan) N Miyagi	3	6^{3}
(Switzerland) E Krapl (West Germany) M Pawlik	3	4
(United Kingdom) J Durie (New Zealand) J Richardson	6	6
4	(Canada) J Hetherington (Australia) A Minter	1	7	2
(United States) H Na (Australia) M Jaggard	6	5	6
(Japan) K Date (Japan) M Kidowaki
(Czechoslovakia) E Švíglerová (United States) M Werdel	w/o
(Australia) L Field (Argentina) A Villagrán-Reami	6	3	0
(New Zealand) B Cordwell (United States) A Henricksson	2	6	6
(Finland) P Thorén (New Zealand) C Toleafoa	6^{2}	0
3	(United States) B Nagelsen (West Germany) E Pfaff	7^{7}	6
(Australia) J-A Faull (Australia) R Stubbs	6	4	6
Q	(France) P Paradis (France) C Suire	4	6	4
(United States) L Allen (France) S Amiach	3	1
2	(United States) K Jordan (Australia) E Smylie	6	6

Quarterfinals
1	(United States) L McNeil (United States) R White	6^{4}	6	7^{7}
(United Kingdom) J Durie (New Zealand) J Richardson	7^{7}	3	6^{4}
(United States) H Na (Australia) M Jaggard	2	6	6
(Czechoslovakia) E Švíglerová (United States) M Werdel	6	2	1
(New Zealand) B Cordwell (United States) A Henricksson	6	7^{8}
3	(United States) B Nagelsen (West Germany) E Pfaff	4	6^{6}
(Australia) J-A Faull (Australia) R Stubbs	1	3
2	(United States) K Jordan (Australia) E Smylie	6	6

Semifinals
1	(United States) L McNeil (United States) R White	2	4
(United States) H Na (Australia) M Jaggard	6	6
(New Zealand) B Cordwell (United States) A Henricksson	3	3
2	(United States) K Jordan (Australia) E Smylie	6	6

Final
(United States) H Na (Australia) M Jaggard	0	6	1
2	(United States) K Jordan (Australia) E Smylie	6	3	6
