= 1987 Suntory Japan Open Tennis Championships =

- Date: 13–19 April
- Edition: 14th
- Surface: Hard / outdoor
- Location: Tokyo, Japan
- Venue: Ariake Coliseum

Champions

Men's singles
- (Sweden) Stefan Edberg

Women's singles
- (Bulgaria) Katerina Maleeva

Men's doubles
- (United States) Paul Annacone / (United States) Kevin Curren

Women's doubles
- (United States) Kathy Jordan / (United States) Betsy Nagelsen
- Japan Open

The 1987 Suntory Japan Open Tennis Championships was a tennis tournament played on outdoor hard courts at the Ariake Coliseum in Tokyo, Japan that was part of the 1987 Nabisco Grand Prix and of the Category 1+ tier of the 1987 WTA Tour. The tournament ran from 13 April through 19 April 1987. Stefan Edberg and Katerina Maleeva won the singles titles.

== Finals ==
=== Men's singles ===
(Sweden) Stefan Edberg defeated (United States) David Pate, 7–6, 6–4

- It was Edberg's 4th title of the year and the 12th of his career.

=== Women's singles ===
(Bulgaria) Katerina Maleeva defeated (United States) Barbara Gerken, 6–2, 6–3

- It was Maleeva's 1st title of the year and the 3rd of her career.

=== Men's doubles ===
(United States) Paul Annacone / (United States) Kevin Curren defeated (Ecuador) Andrés Gómez / (Sweden) Anders Järryd, 6–4, 7–6

- It was Annacone's 3rd title of the year and the 8th of his career. It was Curren's 1st title of the year and the 18th of his career.

=== Women's doubles ===
(United States) Kathy Jordan / (United States) Betsy Nagelsen defeated (United States) Sandy Collins / (United States) Sharon Walsh-Pete, 6–3, 7–5

- It was Jordan's 1st title of the year and the 34th of her career. It was Nagelsen's 2nd title of the year and the 16th of her career.
