= Joe Russell (tennis) =

American tennis player

- Full name: Joseph Russell
- Country (sports): United States
- Born: November 22, 1961 (age 64) San Francisco, U.S.
- Height: 6 ft 2 in (188 cm)
- Plays: Right-handed
- Prize money: $27,031

Singles
- Career record: 2–1
- Highest ranking: No. 205 (July 9, 1990)

Doubles
- Career record: 0–4
- Highest ranking: No. 220 (May 21, 1990)

Joseph Russell (born November 22, 1961) is a former professional tennis player from the United States.

== Biography ==
Russell grew up in California and played in the same junior college team as Brad Gilbert, before transferring to the University of Utah.

A right-handed player, Russell began competing on the international tour in 1988 and based himself in Osaka, Japan. His best ATP Tour performance came at the 1990 Japan Open, where he made the round of 16 as a qualifier, getting past both Tom Nijssen and Dan Goldie, to set up a match against Ivan Lendl. He lost to Lendl in straight sets, but took the world number one to a tiebreak in the first.

Now living in Singapore, he is the co-founder and director of the SITA Tennis Academy.
