= Andy Kohlberg =

American tennis player

- Country (sports): United States
- Born: August 17, 1959 (age 66) New York City, United States
- Height: 5 ft 10 in (1.78 m)
- Turned pro: 1979
- Retired: 1988
- Plays: Left-handed
- Prize money: $169,395

Singles
- Career record: 15–38
- Career titles: 0
- Highest ranking: No. 142 (February 24, 1986)

Grand Slam singles results
- Australian Open: 1R (1982)
- US Open: 1R (1979, 1980, 1981, 1985)

Doubles
- Career record: 90–100
- Career titles: 1
- Highest ranking: No. 26 (July 3, 1988)

Grand Slam doubles results
- Australian Open: 1R (1982)
- French Open: 2R (1980)
- Wimbledon: 3R (1985, 1987)
- US Open: QF (1985)

Andy Kohlberg (born August 17, 1959) is an American former professional tennis player who serves as president of Spanish football club Mallorca.

Kohlberg enjoyed most of his tennis success while playing doubles. During his career he won 1 doubles title. He achieved a career-high doubles ranking of World No. 26 on March 7, 1988.

Kohlberg, with long-term business partner, Robert Sarver, is vice chairman, co-owner of Phoenix, Arizona NBA franchise Phoenix Suns.

Kohlberg, Steve Nash and Steve Kerr co-own La Liga club Mallorca.

He is the son of American businessman Jerome Kohlberg.

== Career finals ==
=== Doubles (1 win, 3 losses) ===
Result	W/L	Date	Tournament	Surface	Partner	Opponents	Score
Loss	0–1	Oct 1980	Canton, China	Carpet	(United States) Larry Stefanki	(Australia) Ross Case (Chile) Jaime Fillol	2–6, 6–7
Loss	0–2	May 1981	Forest Hills WCT, U.S.	Clay	(Australia) John Fitzgerald	(United States) Peter Fleming (United States) John McEnroe	4–6, 4–6
Loss	0–3	Sep 1985	Stuttgart, West Germany	Clay	(Brazil) João Soares	(Czechoslovakia) Ivan Lendl (Czechoslovakia) Tomáš Šmíd	6–3, 4–6, 2–6
Win	1–3	Apr 1986	Atlanta, U.S.	Carpet	(United States) Robert Van't Hof	(South Africa) Christo Steyn (South Africa) Danie Visser	6–2, 6–3
