= Kumiko Okamoto =

Japanese tennis player (born 1965)

- Country (sports): Japan
- Born: 19 February 1965 (age 61) Osaka, Japan
- Retired: 1992
- Prize money: $139,506

Singles
- Career record: 129–88
- Career titles: 4 ITF
- Highest ranking: No. 75 (24 April 1989)

Grand Slam singles results
- Australian Open: 2R (1990)
- French Open: 1R (1987-1990)
- Wimbledon: 3R (1987)
- US Open: 1R (1987-1989)

Other tournaments
- Olympic Games: 1R (1988)

Doubles
- Career record: 33–32
- Career titles: 2 ITF
- Highest ranking: No. 124 (11 April 1988)

Grand Slam doubles results
- Australian Open: 2R (1988)
- French Open: 2R (1987, 1988)
- Wimbledon: 1R (1987, 1988)

Other doubles tournaments
- Olympic Games: QF (1988)
Medal record
Representing Japan
Summer Universiade
Silver medal – second place	1983 Edmonton	Women's doubles

Kumiko Okamoto (Japanese: 岡本久美子, born February 19, 1965) is a retired female tennis player from Japan, who represented her native country at the 1988 Summer Olympics in Seoul, South Korea). In the doubles competition she partnered Etsuko Inoue.

Okamoto 6 singles and doubles finals. She has won 4 singles titles and 2 doubles titles on the ITF finals.

== WTA Career finals ==
=== Singles (1 win) ===
Winner — Legend
Grand Slam tournaments (0–0)
WTA Tour Championships (0–0)
Tier I (0–0)
Tier II (0–0)
Tier III (0–0)
Tier IV (0–0)
Tier V (1–0)
Virginia Slims, Avon, Other (0–0)

Result	W/L	Date	Tournament	Surface	Opponent	Score
Win	1.	Apr 1989	Tokyo, Japan	Hard	(Australia) Elizabeth Smylie	6–4, 6–2

== ITF Finals ==
=== Singles (4–2) ===
Legend
$100,000 tournaments
$75,000 tournaments
$50,000 tournaments
$25,000 tournaments
$10,000 tournaments

Result	No.	Date	Tournament	Surface	Opponent	Score
Win	1.	18 November 1984	Kuroshio, Japan	Hard	(United States) Cheryl Jones	6–2, 4–6, 6–2
Win	2.	28 April 1985	Hatfield, United Kingdom	Hard	(Romania) Daniela Moise	6–4, 6–2
Win	3.	5 May 1985	Sutton, United Kingdom	Hard	(South Africa) Elna Reinach	6–4, 6–7, 6–2
Loss	4.	20 November 1985	Matsuyama, Japan	Hard	(Netherlands) Nanette Schutte	4–6, 1–6
Loss	5.	11 May 1986	Bournemouth, United Kingdom	Clay	(Belarus) Natasha Zvereva	2–6, 6–4, 5–7
Win	6.	12 October 1986	Kofu, Japan	Hard	(Australia) Michelle Jaggard-Lai	7–6, 6–0

=== Doubles (2–4) ===
Result	No.	Date	Tournament	Surface	Partner	Opponents	Score
Win	1.	7 August 1983	Ortisei, Italy	Clay	(Japan) Emiko Okagawa	(Spain) Ana Almansa (Italy) Patrizia Murgo	7–6, 1–6, 6–3
Loss	2.	14 August 1983	Sezze, Italy	Clay	(Japan) Emiko Okagawa	(United Kingdom) Cathy Drury (United Kingdom) Ellinore Lightbody	w/o
Win	3.	21 August 1983	Hechingen, West Germany	Clay	(Japan) Emiko Okagawa	(United Kingdom) Jo Louis (United Kingdom) Lorrayne Gracie	6–2, 6–0
Loss	4.	12 October 1986	Kofu, Japan	Hard	(Japan) Naoko Sato	(New Zealand) Belinda Cordwell (Australia) Michelle Jaggard-Lai	2–6, 6–7
Loss	5.	11 October 1987	Kofu, Japan	Hard	(Japan) Naoko Sato	(Japan) Ei Iida (Japan) Akemi Nishiya	5–7, 2–6
Loss	6.	8 November 1987	Saga, Japan	Hard	(Japan) Naoko Sato	(Japan) Ei Iida (Japan) Maya Kidowaki	6–7, 6–3, 7–9
