= Lindsay Davenport career statistics =

Career statistics of Lindsay Davenport

Career finals
Discipline	Type	Won	Lost	Total	WR (Note: Winning rate)
Singles	Grand Slam	3	4	7	0.43
Singles	WTA Finals (Note: Formerly known as: Virginia Slims Championships (until 1995); WTA Tour Championships (until 2014))	1	3	4	0.25
Singles	WTA 1000 (Note: Formerly known as: Category 4 & 5 & 6 (until 1990); Tier I (until 2009); WTA Premier Mandatory and 5 (until 2021))	11	10	21	0.52
Singles	WTA 500 (Note: Formerly known as: Category 3 (until 1990); Tier II (until 2009); WTA Premier (until 2021))	26	20	46	0.57
Singles	WTA 250 (Note: Formerly known as: Category 1 & 2 (until 1990); Tier III & IV & V (until 2009); WTA International (until 2021))	13	1	14	0.93
Singles	Olympics	1	0	1	1.00
Singles	Total	55	38	93	0.59
Doubles	Grand Slam	3	10	13	0.23
Doubles	WTA Finals	3	0	3	1.00
Doubles	WTA 1000	9	5	14	0.64
Doubles	WTA 500	19	7	26	0.73
Doubles	WTA 250	4	1	5	0.80
Doubles	Olympics	–	–	–	–
Doubles	Total	38	23	61	0.62

This is a list of the main career statistics of American former professional tennis player, Lindsay Davenport.

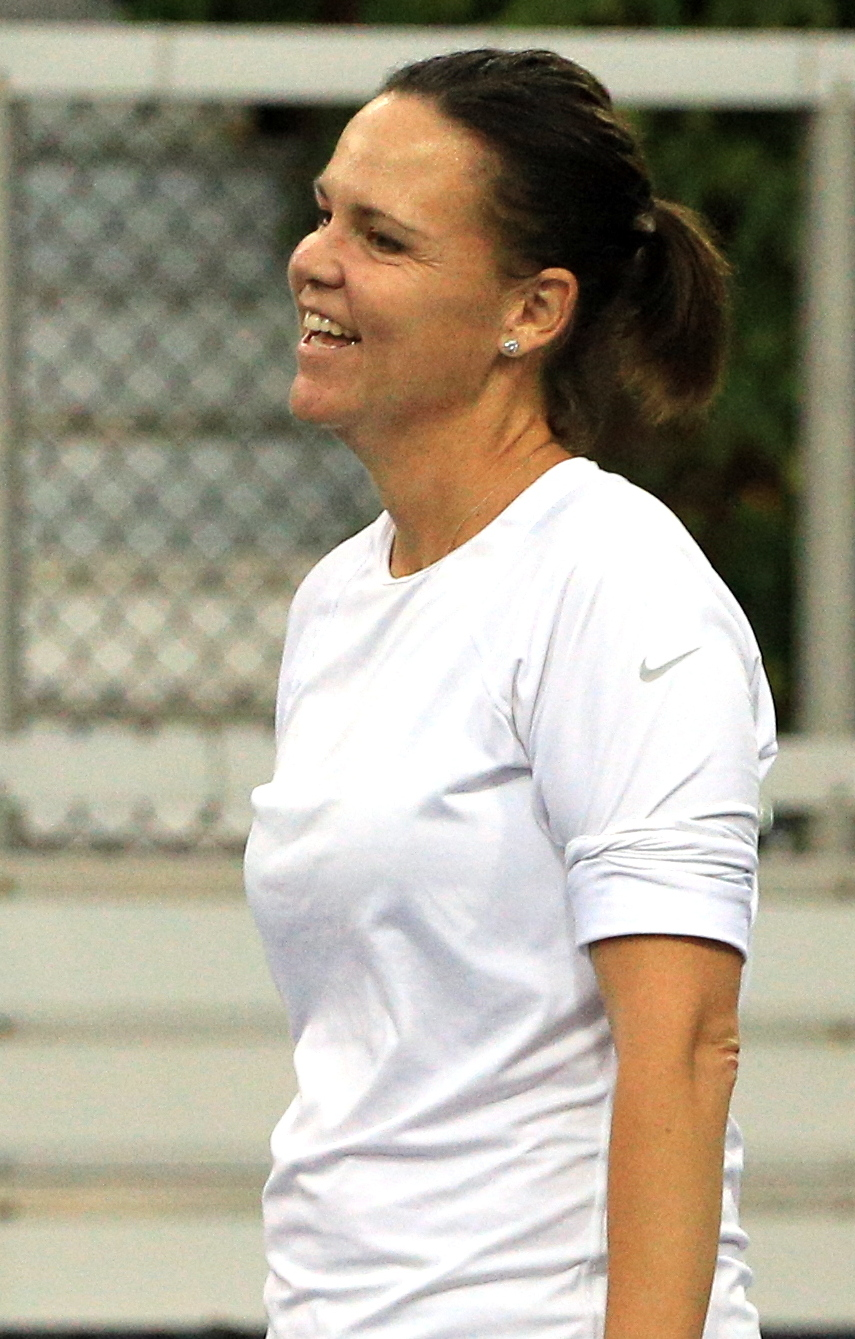
Davenport in 2015

== Performance timelines ==
Key
W	F	SF	QF	#R	RR	Q#	P#	DNQ	A	Z#	PO	G	S	B	NMS	NTI	P	NH

(W) winner; (F) finalist; (SF) semifinalist; (QF) quarterfinalist; (#R) rounds 4, 3, 2, 1; (RR) round-robin stage; (Q#) qualification round; (P#) preliminary round; (DNQ) did not qualify; (A) absent; (Z#) Davis/Fed Cup Zonal Group (with number indication) or (PO) play-off; (G) gold, (S) silver or (B) bronze Olympic/Paralympic medal; (NMS) not a Masters tournament; (NTI) not a Tier I tournament; (P) postponed; (NH) not held; (SR) strike rate (events won / competed); (W–L) win–loss record.

=== Singles ===
Tournament	1991	1992	1993	1994	1995	1996	1997	1998	1999	2000	2001	2002	2003	2004	2005	2006	2007	2008	SR	W–L	Win%
Grand Slam tournaments
Australian Open	A	A	3R	QF	QF	4R	4R	SF	SF	W	SF	A	4R	QF	F	QF	A	2R	1 / 14	56–13	81%
French Open	A	Q2	1R	3R	4R	QF	4R	SF	QF	1R	A	A	4R	4R	QF	A	A	A	0 / 11	31–11	74%
Wimbledon	A	Q1	3R	QF	4R	2R	2R	QF	W	F	SF	A	QF	SF	F	A	A	2R	1 / 13	49–11	82%
US Open	1R	2R	4R	3R	2R	4R	SF	W	SF	F	QF	SF	SF	SF	QF	QF	A	3R	1 / 17	62–16	79%
Win–loss	0–1	1–1	7–4	12–4	11–4	11–4	12–4	21–3	21–3	19–3	14–3	5–1	15–4	17–4	20–4	8–2	0–0	4–2	3 / 55	198–51	80%
National representation
Summer Olympics	NH	A	not held			G	not held			2R	not held			A	not held			A	1 / 2	7–0	100%
Year-end championships
WTA Finals	A	A	A	F	1R	QF	1R	F	W	1R	F	1R	A	RR	SF	A	A	A	1 / 11	18–11	62%
Grand Slam Cup	Men's Only Event							QF	SF	not held									0 / 2	1–2	33%
WTA 1000 + former^{†} tournaments
Qatar Open	not held										not Tier I							A	0 / 0	0–0	–
Indian Wells Open	not Tier I					SF	W	F	2R	W	QF	A	F	F	F	4R	A	QF	2 / 11	40–9	82%
Miami Open	A	2R	2R	SF	4R	SF	4R	QF	QF	F	QF	A	4R	A	A	A	A	4R	0 / 12	32–12	73%
Italian Open	A	A	A	A	A	A	A	A	A	3R	A	A	A	A	A	A	A	A	0 / 1	1–1	50%
Canadian Open	A	A	A	A	A	A	QF	A	A	3R	A	A	A	A	A	A	A	A	0 / 2	3–2	60%
Pan Pacific Open^{†}	not Tier I		A	A	F	QF	QF	W	QF	A	W	A	W	W	F	A	A	A	4 / 9	27–5	84%
Charleston Open^{†}	A	A	2R	QF	A	A	QF	QF	A	A	A	A	SF	QF	QF	A	A	A	0 / 7	14–7	67%
German Open^{†}	A	A	A	A	A	A	2R	3R	A	A	A	A	A	A	A	A	A	A	0 / 2	1–2	33%
Southern California Open^{†}	not Tier I													W	A	A	A	NH	1 / 1	5–0	100%
Kremlin Cup^{†}	not held					NTI	A	A	A	A	A	F	A	SF	A	A	A	A	0 / 2	5–2	71%
Zurich Open^{†}	not Tier I		A	A	A	A	W	W	A	F	W	F	A	A	W	A	A	NTI	4 / 6	22–2	92%
Philadelphia Championship^{†}	not Tier I		2R	2R	A	not Tier I										not held			0 / 2	2–2	50%
Career statistics
Tournaments	3	12	16	17	15	18	22	21	19	19	17	9	16	17	16	8	3	8	256		
Finals	0	0	1	3	3	4	8	10	8	12	11	4	6	9	10	1	2	2	94		
Titles	0	0	1	2	1	3	6	6	7	4	7	0	1	7	6	0	2	2	55		
Hardcourt win–loss	3–3	9–7	23–8	21–5	15–8	29–6	34–8	38–8	36–7	41–8	49–8	18–6	29–10	39–4	40–6	19–7	13–1	19–5	33	475–115	81%
Clay win–loss	0–0	8–5	10–4	16–5	8–1	9–1	10–4	13–4	9–2	1–1	0–0	0–0	10–3	13–3	11–2	0–0	0–0	4–0	8	122–35	78%
Grass win–loss	0–0	0–1	2–2	4–1	3–1	2–2	1–1	4–1	7–0	7–2	9–1	0–0	4–2	5–1	6–1	0–0	0–0	1–0	2	55–16	77%
Carpet win–loss	0–0	0–0	3–2	7–4	7–3	11–6	14–3	14–2	9–1	11–1	4–0	6–3	4–0	6–1	3–1	2–1	0–0	0–0	12	101–28	78%
Overall win–loss	3–3	17–13	38–16	48–15	33–13	51–15	59–16	69–15	61–10	60–12	62–9	24–9	47–15	63–9	60–10	21–8	13–1	24–5	55 / 256	753–194	80%
Win %	50%	57%	70%	76%	72%	77%	79%	82%	86%	83%	88%	73%	76%	88%	86%	72%	93%	83%	80%		
Year-end ranking	339	159	20	6	12	9	3	1	2	2	1	12	5	1	1	25	73	36			

=== Doubles ===
Tournament	1991	1992	1993	1994	1995	1996	1997	1998	1999	2000	2001	2002	2003	2004	2005	2006	2007	2008	SR	W–L
Grand Slam tournaments
Australian Open	A	A	3R	3R	SF	F	F	F	F	SF	F	A	SF	3R	F	A	A	3R	0 / 13	48–12
French Open	A	A	1R	F	SF	W	3R	F	SF	A	A	A	3R	A	A	A	A	A	1 / 8	28–6
Wimbledon	A	A	2R	3R	1R	QF	QF	F	W	A	A	A	SF	A	2R	A	A	A	1 / 9	25–7
US Open	1R	1R	1R	QF	3R	A	W	F	QF	A	A	A	A	A	A	A	A	3R	1 / 9	21–8
Win–loss	0–1	0–1	3–4	12–4	9–4	14–2	16–2	20–4	18–3	4–1	5–1	0–0	10–2	2–1	6–2	0 / 0	0 / 0	4–1	3 / 39	123–33

== Significant finals ==
=== Grand Slams ===
==== Singles: 7 (3 titles, 4 runner-ups) ====
Result	Year	Championship	Surface	Opponent	Score
Win	1998	US Open	Hard	(Switzerland) Martina Hingis	6–3, 7–5
Win	1999	Wimbledon	Grass	(Germany) Steffi Graf	6–4, 7–5
Win	2000	Australian Open	Hard	(Switzerland) Martina Hingis	6–1, 7–5
Loss	2000	Wimbledon	Grass	(United States) Venus Williams	3–6, 6–7^{(3–7)}
Loss	2000	US Open	Hard	(United States) Venus Williams	4–6, 5–7
Loss	2005	Australian Open	Hard	(United States) Serena Williams	6–2, 3–6, 0–6
Loss	2005	Wimbledon	Grass	(United States) Venus Williams	6–4, 6–7^{(4–7)}, 7–9

==== Doubles: 13 (3 titles, 10 runner-ups) ====
Result	Year	Championship	Surface	Partner	Opponents	Score
Loss	1994	French Open	Clay	(United States) Lisa Raymond	(United States) Gigi Fernández (Belarus) Natasha Zvereva	6–2, 6–2
Loss	1996	Australian Open	Hard	(United States) Mary Joe Fernández	(United States) Chanda Rubin (Spain) Arantxa Sánchez Vicario	7–5, 2–6, 6–4
Win	1996	French Open	Clay	(United States) Mary Joe Fernández	(United States) Gigi Fernández (Belarus) Natasha Zvereva	6–2, 6–1
Loss	1997	Australian Open (2)	Hard	(United States) Lisa Raymond	(Switzerland) Martina Hingis (Belarus) Natasha Zvereva	6–2, 6–2
Win	1997	US Open	Hard	(Czech Republic) Jana Novotná	(United States) Gigi Fernández (Belarus) Natasha Zvereva	6–3, 6–4
Loss	1998	Australian Open (3)	Hard	(Belarus) Natasha Zvereva	(Switzerland) Martina Hingis (Croatia) Mirjana Lučić	6–4, 2–6, 6–3
Loss	1998	French Open (2)	Clay	(Belarus) Natasha Zvereva	(Switzerland) Martina Hingis (Czech Republic) Jana Novotná	6–1, 7–6
Loss	1998	Wimbledon	Grass	(Belarus) Natasha Zvereva	(Switzerland) Martina Hingis (Czech Republic) Jana Novotná	6–3, 3–6, 8–6
Loss	1998	US Open	Hard	(Belarus) Natasha Zvereva	(Switzerland) Martina Hingis (Czech Republic) Jana Novotná	6–3, 6–3
Loss	1999	Australian Open (4)	Hard	(Belarus) Natasha Zvereva	(Switzerland) Martina Hingis (Russia) Anna Kournikova	7–5, 6–3
Win	1999	Wimbledon	Grass	(United States) Corina Morariu	(South Africa) Mariaan de Swardt (Ukraine) Elena Tatarkova	6–4, 6–4
Loss	2001	Australian Open (5)	Hard	(United States) Corina Morariu	(United States) Serena Williams (United States) Venus Williams	6–2, 2–6, 6–4
Loss	2005	Australian Open (6)	Hard	(United States) Corina Morariu	(Russia) Svetlana Kuznetsova (Australia) Alicia Molik	6–3, 6–4

=== Summer Olympics ===
==== Singles: 1 gold medal ====
Result	Year	Tournament	Surface	Opponent	Score
Gold	1996	Atlanta Olympics	Hard	(Spain) Arantxa Sánchez Vicario	7–6^{(7–6)}, 6–2

=== WTA Finals ===
==== Singles: 4 (1 title, 3 runner-ups) ====
Result	Year	Tournament	Surface	Opponent	Score
Loss	1994	Virginia Slims Championships, United States	Carpet (i)	(Argentina) Gabriela Sabatini	3–6, 2–6, 4–6
Loss	1998	WTA Tour Championships, United States	Carpet (i)	(Switzerland) Martina Hingis	5–7, 4–6, 6–4, 2–6
Win	1999	WTA Tour Championships, United States	Carpet (i)	(Switzerland) Martina Hingis	6–4, 6–2
Walkover	2001	WTA Tour Championships, Germany	Hard (i)	(United States) Serena Williams	walkover

==== Doubles: 3 titles ====
Result	Year	Tournament	Surface	Partner	Opponents	Score
Win	1996	WTA Tour Championships, United States	Carpet (i)	(United States) Mary Joe Fernández	(Czechoslovakia) Jana Novotná (Spain) Arantxa Sánchez Vicario	6–4, 6–2
Win	1997	WTA Tour Championships, United States	Carpet (i)	(Czechoslovakia) Jana Novotná	(France) Alexandra Fusai (France) Nathalie Tauziat	6–4, 6–2
Win	1998	WTA Tour Championships, United States	Carpet (i)	(Belarus) Natasha Zvereva	(France) Alexandra Fusai (France) Nathalie Tauziat	6–4, 6–2

=== WTA 1000 ===
==== Singles: 21 (11 titles, 10 runners-up) ====
Result	Year	Tournament	Surface	Opponent	Score
Loss	1995	Pan Pacific Open	Carpet (i)	(Empire of Japan) Kimiko Date	1–6, 2–6
Win	1997	Indian Wells Open	Hard	(Romania) Irina Spîrlea	6–2, 6–1
Win	1997	Zurich Open	Carpet (i)	(France) Nathalie Tauziat	7–6^{(7–3)}, 7–5
Win	1998	Pan Pacific Open	Carpet (i)	(Switzerland) Martina Hingis	6–3, 6–3
Loss	1998	Indian Wells Open	Hard	(Switzerland) Martina Hingis	3–6, 4–6
Win	1998	Zurich Open	Carpet (i)	(United States) Venus Williams	7–5, 6–3
Win	2000	Indian Wells Open	Hard	(Switzerland) Martina Hingis	4–6, 6–4, 6–0
Loss	2000	Miami Open	Hard	(Switzerland) Martina Hingis	3–6, 2–6
Loss	2000	Zurich Open	Hard (i)	(Switzerland) Martina Hingis	4–6, 6–4, 5–7
Win	2001	Pan Pacific Open	Carpet (i)	(Switzerland) Martina Hingis	6–3, 6–3
Win	2001	Zurich Open	Hard (i)	(Federal Republic of Yugoslavia) Jelena Dokić	6–3, 6–1
Loss	2002	Kremlin Cup	Carpet (i)	(Bulgaria) Magdalena Maleeva	7–5, 3–6, 6–7^{(4–7)}
Loss	2002	Zurich Open	Hard (i)	(Switzerland) Patty Schnyder	7–6^{(7–5)}, 6–7^{(6–8)}, 3–6
Win	2003	Pan Pacific Open	Carpet (i)	(United States) Monica Seles	6–7^{(6–8)}, 6–1, 6–2
Loss	2003	Indian Wells Open	Hard	(Belgium) Kim Clijsters	4–6, 5–7
Win	2004	Pan Pacific Open	Carpet (i)	(Bulgaria) Magdalena Maleeva	6–4, 6–1
Loss	2004	Indian Wells Open	Hard	(Belgium) Justine Henin	1–6, 4–6
Win	2004	Southern California Open	Hard	(Russia) Anastasia Myskina	6–1, 6–1
Loss	2005	Pan Pacific Open	Carpet (i)	(Russia) Maria Sharapova	1–6, 6–3, 6–7^{(5–7)}
Loss	2005	Indian Wells Open	Hard	(Belgium) Kim Clijsters	4–6, 6–4, 2–6
Win	2005	Zurich Open	Hard (i)	(Switzerland) Patty Schnyder	7–6^{(7–5)}, 6–3

==== Doubles: 14 (9 titles, 5 runners-up) ====
Result	Year	Tournament	Surface	Partner	Opponents	Score
Loss	1995	Pan Pacific Open	Carpet	(Australia) Rennae Stubbs	(United States) Gigi Fernández (Belarus) Natasha Zvereva	0–6, 3–6
Win	1997	Pan Pacific Open	Carpet	(Belarus) Natasha Zvereva	(United States) Gigi Fernández (Switzerland) Martina Hingis	6–4, 6–3
Win	1997	Indian Wells Open	Hard	(Belarus) Natasha Zvereva	(United States) Lisa Raymond (France) Nathalie Tauziat	6–3, 6–2
Loss	1997	Charleston Open	Clay	(Czechoslovakia) Jana Novotná	(United States) Mary Joe Fernandez (Switzerland) Martina Hingis	5–7, 6–4, 1–6
Win	1997	Berlin Open	Clay	(Czechoslovakia) Jana Novotná	(United States) Gigi Fernández (Belarus) Natasha Zvereva	6–2, 3–6, 6–2
Loss	1998	Pan Pacific Open	Carpet	(Belarus) Natasha Zvereva	(Croatia) Mirjana Lučić (Switzerland) Martina Hingis	5–7, 4–6
Win	1998	Indian Wells Open	Hard	(Belarus) Natasha Zvereva	(France) Alexandra Fusai (France) Nathalie Tauziat	6–4, 2–6, 6–4
Win	1998	Berlin Open	Clay	(Belarus) Natasha Zvereva	(France) Alexandra Fusai (France) Nathalie Tauziat	6–3, 6–0
Win	1999	Pan Pacific Open	Carpet	(Belarus) Natasha Zvereva	(Czechoslovakia) Jana Novotná (Switzerland) Martina Hingis	6–2, 6–3
Win	2000	Indian Wells Open	Hard	(United States) Corina Morariu	(Russia) Anna Kournikova (Belarus) Natasha Zvereva	6–2, 6–3
Win	2001	Zurich Open	Hard	(United States) Lisa Raymond	(France) Sandrine Testud (Italy) Roberta Vinci	6–3, 2–6, 6–2
Loss	2003	Pan Pacific Open	Carpet	(United States) Lisa Raymond	(Australia) Rennae Stubbs (Russia) Elena Bovina	3–6, 4–6
Win	2003	Indian Wells Open	Hard	(United States) Lisa Raymond	(Belgium) Kim Clijsters (Japan) Ai Sugiyama	3–6, 6–4, 6–1
Loss	2005	Pan Pacific Open	Carpet	(United States) Corina Morariu	(Slovakia) Janette Husárová (Russia) Elena Likhovtseva	4–6, 3–6

== WTA Tour finals ==
=== Singles: 94 (55 titles, 38 runner-ups, 1 not played) ===
Legend Grand Slam tournaments (3–4) Olympics (1–0) Finals (1–3) WTA 1000 (Tier I) (11–10) WTA 500 (Tier II) (26–20) WTA 250 (Tier III / Tier IV) (13–1)	Finals by surface Hard (33–26) Clay (8–2) Grass (2–2) Carpet (12–8)

Result	W–L	Date	Tournament	Tier	Surface	Opponent	Score
Win	1–0	May 1993	European Open, Lucerne, Switzerland (1)	Tier III	Clay	(Australia) Nicole Bradtke	6–1, 4–6, 6–2
Win	2–0	Jan 1994	Danone Hardcourt Championships, Brisbane, Australia	Tier III	Hard	(Argentina) Florencia Labat	6–1, 2–6, 6–3
Win	3–0	May 1994	European Open, Lucerne, Switzerland (2)	Tier III	Clay	(United States) Lisa Raymond	7–6^{(7–3)}, 6–4
Loss	3–1	Nov 1994	Virginia Slims Championship, New York, US (1)	Finals	Carpet (i)	(Argentina) Gabriela Sabatini	6–3, 6–2, 6–4
Loss	3–2	Jan 1995	Peters International, Sydney, Australia	Tier II	Hard	(Argentina) Gabriela Sabatini	6–3, 6–4
Loss	3–3	Feb 1995	Toray Pan Pacific Open, Tokyo, Japan (1)	Tier I	Carpet (i)	(Japan) Kimiko Date	6–1, 6–2
Win	4–3	May 1995	Internationaux de Strasbourg, Strasbourg, France (1)	Tier III	Clay	(Japan) Kimiko Date	3–6, 6–1, 6–2
Loss	4–4	Jan 1996	Peters Invitational, Sydney, Australia (2)	Tier II	Hard	(United States) Monica Seles	4–6, 7–6^{(9–7)}, 6–3
Win	5–4	May 1996	Internationaux de Strasbourg, Strasbourg, France (2)	Tier III	Clay	(Austria) Barbara Paulus	6–3, 7–6^{(8–6)}
Win	6–4	Jul 1996	Olympics, Atlanta, US	Olympics	Hard	(Spain) Arantxa Sánchez Vicario	7–6^{(8–6)}, 6–2
Win	7–4	Aug 1996	Acura Classic, Los Angeles, US (1)	Tier II	Hard	(Germany) Anke Huber	6–2, 6–3
Win	8–4	Feb 1997	IGA Tennis Classic, Oklahoma, US (1)	Tier III	Hard	(United States) Lisa Raymond	6–4, 6–2
Win	9–4	Mar 1997	State Farm Evert Cup, Indian Wells, US (1)	Tier I	Hard	(Romania) Irina Spîrlea	6–2, 6–1
Win	10–4	Apr 1997	Bausch & Lomb Championships, Amelia Island, US (1)	Tier II	Clay	(France) Mary Pierce	6–2, 6–3
Loss	10–5	Aug 1997	Acura Classic, Los Angeles, US	Tier II	Hard	(United States) Monica Seles	5–7, 7–5, 6–4
Win	11–5	Aug 1997	U.S. Hardcourt Championships, Atlanta, US	Tier II	Hard	(France) Sandrine Testud	6–4, 6–1
Win	12–5	Oct 1997	European Indoor Championships, Zurich, Switzerland (1)	Tier I	Carpet	(France) Nathalie Tauziat	7–6^{(7–3)}, 7–5
Win	13–5	Nov 1997	Ameritech Cup, Chicago, US	Tier II	Carpet	(France) Nathalie Tauziat	6–0, 7–5
Loss	13–6	Nov 1997	Advanta Championships, Philadelphia, US (2)	Tier II	Carpet	(Switzerland) Martina Hingis	7–5, 6–7(7), 7–6^{(7–4)}
Win	14–6	Feb 1998	Toray Pan Pacific Open, Tokyo, Japan (1)	Tier I	Carpet	(Switzerland) Martina Hingis	6–3, 6–3
Loss	14–7	Mar 1998	State Farm Evert Cup, Indian Wells, US	Tier I	Hard	(Switzerland) Martina Hingis	6–3, 6–4
Win	15–7	Jul 1998	Bank of the West Classic, Stanford, US (1)	Tier II	Hard	(United States) Venus Williams	6–4, 5–7, 6–4
Win	16–7	Aug 1998	Toshiba Classic, San Diego, US (1)	Tier II	Hard	(France) Mary Pierce	6–3, 6–1
Win	17–7	Aug 1998	Acura Classic, Los Angeles, US (2)	Tier II	Hard	(Switzerland) Martina Hingis	4–6, 6–4, 6–3
Win	18–7	Aug 1998	US Open, New York	Grand Slam	Hard	(Switzerland) Martina Hingis	6–3, 7–5
Loss	18–8	Oct 1998	Filderstadt, Stuttgart, Germany	Tier II	Hard (i)	(France) Sandrine Testud	7–5, 6–3
Win	19–8	Oct 1998	European Indoor Championships, Zurich, Switzerland (2)	Tier I	Carpet	(United States) Venus Williams	7–5, 6–3
Loss	19–9	Nov 1998	Advanta Championships, Philadelphia, US	Tier II	Carpet	(Germany) Steffi Graf	4–6, 6–3, 6–4
Loss	19–10	Nov 1998	Chase Championships, New York, US (2)	Finals	Carpet	(Switzerland) Martina Hingis	7–5, 4–6, 6–4, 6–2
Win	20–10	Jan 1999	Sydney International, Sydney, Australia	Tier II	Hard	(Switzerland) Martina Hingis	6–4, 6–3
Win	21–10	May 1999	Open Villa de Madrid, Madrid, Spain	Tier III	Clay	(Argentina) Paola Suárez	6–1, 6–3
Win	22–10	Jun 1999	Wimbledon, London, UK	Grand Slam	Grass	(Germany) Steffi Graf	6–4, 7–5
Win	23–10	Jul 1999	Bank of the West Classic, Stanford, US (2)	Tier II	Hard	(United States) Venus Williams	7–6^{(7–1)}, 6–2
Loss	23–11	Aug 1999	Pilot Pen Tennis, New Haven, US (1)	Tier II	Hard	(United States) Venus Williams	6–2, 7–5
Win	24–11	Sep 1999	Toyota Princess Cup, Tokyo, Japan	Tier II	Hard	(United States) Monica Seles	7–5, 7–6^{(7–1)}
Win	25–11	Nov 1999	Advanta Championships, Philadelphia, US (1)	Tier II	Carpet	(Switzerland) Martina Hingis	6–3, 6–4
Win	26–11	Nov 1999	Chase Championships, New York, US	Finals	Carpet	(Switzerland) Martina Hingis	6–4, 6–2
Loss	26–12	Jan 2000	Adidas International, Sydney, Australia (3)	Tier II	Hard	(France) Amélie Mauresmo	7–6^{(7–2)}, 6–4
Win	27–12	Jan 2000	Australian Open, Melbourne, Australia	Grand Slam	Hard	(Switzerland) Martina Hingis	6–1, 7–5
Canceled	27–12	Mar 2000	Scottsdale Women's Tennis Classic, US	Tier II	Hard	(Switzerland) Martina Hingis	N/A
Win	28–12	Mar 2000	Tennis Masters Series, Indian Wells, US (2)	Tier I	Hard	(Switzerland) Martina Hingis	4–6, 6–4, 6–0
Loss	28–13	Apr 2000	Ericsson Open, Key Biscayne, US	Tier I	Hard	(Switzerland) Martina Hingis	6–3, 6–2
Loss	28–14	Jun 2000	The Championships, London, UK (1)	Grand Slam	Grass	(United States) Venus Williams	6–3, 7–6^{(7–3)}
Loss	28–15	Jul 2000	Bank of the West Classic, Stanford, US (1)	Tier II	Hard	(United States) Venus Williams	6–1, 6–4
Loss	28–16	Aug 2000	Estyle.com Classic, Los Angeles, US (2)	Tier II	Hard	(United States) Serena Williams	4–6, 6–4, 7–6^{(7–1)}
Loss	28–17	Aug 2000	US Open, New York (1)	Grand Slam	Hard	(United States) Venus Williams	6–4, 7–5
Loss	28–18	Oct 2000	Swisscom Challenge, Zurich, Switzerland (1)	Tier I	Hard	(Switzerland) Martina Hingis	6–4, 4–6, 7–5
Win	29–18	Oct 2000	Generali Ladies Linz, Linz, Austria (1)	Tier II	Carpet	(United States) Venus Williams	6–4, 3–6, 6–2
Win	30–18	Nov 2000	Advanta Championships, Philadelphia (2)	Tier II	Carpet	(Switzerland) Martina Hingis	7–6(7), 6–4
Loss	30–19	Jan 2001	Adidas International, Sydney, Australia (4)	Tier II	Hard	(Switzerland) Martina Hingis	6–3, 4–6, 7–5
Win	31–19	Jan 2001	Toray Pan Pacific Open, Tokyo, Japan (2)	Tier I	Carpet	(Switzerland) Martina Hingis	6–7^{(4–7)}, 6–4, 6–2
Win	32–19	Feb 2001	State Farm Classic, Scotssdale, US	Tier II	Hard	(United States) Meghann Shaughnessy	6–2, 6–3
Win	33–19	Jun 2001	Britannic Asset Management; International Championships, Eastbourne, UK	Tier II	Grass	(Spain) Magüi Serna	6–2, 6–0
Loss	33–20	Jul 2001	Bank of the West Classic, Stanford, US (2)	Tier II	Hard	(Belgium) Kim Clijsters	6–4, 6–7^{(5–7)}, 6–1
Win	34–20	Aug 2001	estyle.com Classic, Los Angeles, US (3)	Tier II	Hard	(United States) Monica Seles	6–3, 7–5
Loss	34–21	Aug 2001	Pilot Pen Tennis, New Haven (2)	Tier II	Hard	(United States) Venus Williams	7–6^{(8–6)}, 6–4
Win	35–21	Oct 2001	Porsche Tennis Grand Prix, Filderstadt, Germany (1)	Tier II	Hard	(Belgium) Justine Henin	7–5, 6–4
Win	36–21	Oct 2001	Swisscom Challenge, Zurich, Switzerland (3)	Tier I	Hard	(Federal Republic of Yugoslavia) Jelena Dokić	6–3, 6–1
Win	37–21	Oct 2001	Generali Ladies Linz, Linz, Austria (2)	Tier II	Hard	(Federal Republic of Yugoslavia) Jelena Dokić	6–4, 6–1
Loss	37–22	Nov 2001	Sanex Championships, Munich, Germany (3)	Finals	Hard	(United States) Serena Williams	walkover
Loss	37–23	Aug 2002	JPMorgan Chase Open, Los Angeles, US (3)	Tier II	Hard	(United States) Chanda Rubin	5–7, 7–6, 6–3
Loss	37–24	Aug 2002	Pilot Pen Tennis, New Haven, US (3)	Tier II	Hard	(United States) Venus Williams	7–5, 6–0
Loss	37–25	Oct 2002	Kremlin Cup, Moscow, Russia	Tier I	Carpet (I)	(Bulgaria) Magdalena Maleeva	5–7, 6–3, 7–6
Loss	37–26	Oct 2002	Zürich Open, Zürich, Switzerland (2)	Tier I	Hard (i)	(Switzerland) Patty Schnyder	6–7^{(5–7)}, 7–6^{(10–8)}, 6–3
Loss	37–27	Jan 2003	Adidas International, Sydney, Australia (5)	Tier II	Hard	(Belgium) Kim Clijsters	6–4, 6–3
Win	38–27	Jan 2003	Toray Pan Pacific Open, Tokyo, Japan (3)	Tier I	Carpet (i)	(United States) Monica Seles	6–7^{(6–8)}, 6–1, 6–2
Loss	38–28	Mar 2003	Pacific Life Open, Indian Wells, US (2)	Tier I	Hard	(Belgium) Kim Clijsters	6–4, 7–5
Loss	38–29	Apr 2003	Bausch & Lomb Championships, Florida, US	Tier II	Clay	(Russia) Elena Dementieva	4–6, 7–5, 6–3
Loss	38–30	Aug 2003	JPMorgan Chase Open, Los Angeles, US (4)	Tier II	Hard	(Belgium) Kim Clijsters	6–1, 3–6, 6–1
Loss	38–31	Aug 2003	Pilot Pen Tennis, New Haven, US (4)	Tier II	Hard	(United States) Jennifer Capriati	6–2, 4–0 retired
Win	39–31	Feb 2004	Toray Pan Pacific Open, Tokyo, Japan (4)	Tier I	Carpet (i)	(Bulgaria) Magdalena Maleeva	6–4, 6–1
Loss	39–32	Mar 2004	Pacific Life Open, Indian Wells, US (3).	Tier I	Hard	(Belgium) Justine Henin	6–1, 6–4
Win	40–32	Apr 2004	Bausch & Lomb Championships, Florida, US (2)	Tier II	Clay	(France) Amélie Mauresmo	6–4, 6–4
Loss	40–33	May 2004	Internationaux de Strasbourg, Strasbourg, France	Tier III	Clay	(Luxembourg) Claudine Schaul	2–6, 6–0, 6–3
Win	41–33	Jul 2004	Bank of the West Classic, Stanford, US (3)	Tier II	Hard	(United States) Venus Williams	7–6^{(7–4)}, 5–7, 7–6^{(7–4)}
Win	42–33	Jul 2004	JPMorgan Chase Open, Los Angeles, US (4)	Tier II	Hard	(United States) Serena Williams	6–1, 6–3
Win	43–33	Jul 2004	Acura Classic, San Diego, US (2)	Tier I	Hard	(Russia) Anastasia Myskina	6–1, 6–1
Win	44–33	Aug 2004	Western & Southern Financial Women's Open, Cincinnati, US	Tier III	Hard	(Russia) Vera Zvonareva	6–3, 6–2
Win	45–33	Oct 2004	Porsche Tennis Grand Prix, Filderstadt, Germany (2)	Tier II	Hard	(France) Amélie Mauresmo	6–2 retired
Loss	45–34	Jan 2005	Australian Open, Melbourne	Grand Slam	Hard	(United States) Serena Williams	2–6, 6–3, 6–0
Loss	45–35	Feb 2005	Toray Pan Pacific Open, Tokyo, Japan (2)	Tier I	Carpet (i)	(Russia) Maria Sharapova	6–1, 3–6, 7–6^{(7–5)}
Win	46–35	Mar 2005	Dubai Duty Free Women's Open, Dubai, UAE	Tier II	Hard	(Serbia and Montenegro) Jelena Janković	6–4, 3–6, 6–4
Loss	46–36	Mar 2005	Pacific Life Open, Indian Wells, US (4)	Tier I	Hard	(Belgium) Kim Clijsters	6–4, 4–6, 6–2
Win	47–36	Apr 2005	Bausch & Lomb Championships, Florida, US (3)	Tier II	Clay	(Italy) Silvia Farina Elia	7–5, 7–5
Loss	47–37	Jul 2005	Wimbledon Championships, London, UK (2)	Grand Slam	Grass	(United States) Venus Williams	4–6, 7–6^{(7–4)}, 9–7
Win	48–37	Aug 2005	Pilot Pen Tennis, New Haven, US	Tier II	Hard	(France) Amélie Mauresmo	6–4, 6–4
Win	49–37	Sep 2005	Wismilak International, Bali, Indonesia (1)	Tier III	Hard	(Italy) Francesca Schiavone	6–2, 6–4
Win	50–37	Oct 2005	Porsche Tennis Grand Prix, Filderstadt, Germany (3)	Tier II	Hard	(France) Amélie Mauresmo	6–2, 6–4
Win	51–37	Oct 2005	Zürich Open, Zurich, Switzerland (4)	Tier I	Hard	(Switzerland) Patty Schnyder	7–6^{(7–5)}, 6–3
Loss	51–38	Aug 2006	Pilot Pen Tennis, New Haven, US (5)	Tier II	Hard	(Belgium) Justine Henin	6–0, 1–0 retired
Win	52–38	Sep 2007	Commonwealth Bank Tennis Classic, Bali, Indonesia (2)	Tier III	Hard	(Slovakia) Daniela Hantuchová	6–4, 3–6, 6–2
Win	53–38	Nov 2007	Bell Challenge, Quebec City, Canada	Tier III	Carpet (i)	(Ukraine) Julia Vakulenko	6–4, 6–1
Win	54–38	Jan 2008	ASB Classic, Auckland, New Zealand	Tier IV	Hard	(France) Aravane Rezaï	6–2, 6–2
Win	55–38	Mar 2008	Cellular South Cup, Memphis, US (2)	Tier III	Hard (i)	(Belarus) Olga Govortsova	6–2, 6–1

=== Doubles: 61 (38 titles, 23 runner-ups) ===
Legend Grand Slam tournaments (3–10) Finals (3–0) WTA 1000 (Tier I) (9–5) WTA 500 (Tier II / Premier) (19–7) WTA 250 (Tier III) (4–1)	Finals by surface Hard (24–12) Clay (6–4) Grass (2–1) Carpet (6–6)

Result	W–L	Date	Tournament	Tier	Surface	Partner	Opponents	Score
Loss	0–1	May 1993	European Open	Tier III	Clay	(United States) Marianne Werdel	(United States) Mary Joe Fernandez (Czech Republic) Helena Suková	6–2, 6–4
Win	1–1	Feb 1994	Indian Wells, U.S.	Tier II	Hard	(United States) Lisa Raymond	(Netherlands) Manon Bollegraf (Czech Republic) Helena Suková	6–2, 6–4
Loss	1–2	Jun 1994	French Open (1)	Grand Slam	Clay	(United States) Lisa Raymond	(United States) Gigi Fernández (Belarus) Natasha Zvereva	6–2, 6–2
Win	2–2	Nov 1994	Oakland, U.S.	Tier II	Carpet	(Spain) Arantxa Sánchez Vicario	(United States) Gigi Fernández (United States) Martina Navratilova	7–5, 6–4
Win	3–2	Jan 1995	Sydney, Australia	Tier II	Hard	(Czech Republic) Jana Novotná	(United States) Patty Fendick (United States) Mary Joe Fernández	7–5, 2–6, 6–4
Loss	3–3	Feb 1995	Toray Pan Pacific Open (1)	Tier I	Carpet	(Australia) Rennae Stubbs	(United States) Gigi Fernández (Belarus) Natasha Zvereva	6–0, 6–3
Win	4–3	Mar 1995	Indian Wells, U.S.	Tier II	Hard	(United States) Lisa Raymond	(Spain) Arantxa Sánchez Vicario (Latvia) Larisa Neiland	2–6, 6–4, 6–3
Win	5–3	May 1995	Strasbourg, France	Tier III	Clay	(United States) Mary Joe Fernández	(Belgium) Sabine Appelmans (Netherlands) Miriam Oremans	6–2, 6–3
Win	6–3	Sep 1995	Tokyo (Nichirei), Japan	Tier II	Hard	(United States) Mary Joe Fernández	(South Africa) Amanda Coetzer (United States) Linda Wild	6–3, 6–2
Win	7–3	Jan 1996	Sydney, Australia	Tier II	Hard	(United States) Mary Joe Fernández	(United States) Lori McNeil (Czech Republic) Helena Suková	6–3, 6–3
Loss	7–4	Jan 1996	Australian Open (1)	Grand Slam	Hard	(United States) Mary Joe Fernandez	(United States) Chanda Rubin (Spain) Arantxa Sánchez Vicario	7–5, 2–6, 6–4
Win	8–4	Jun 1996	French Open, Paris	Grand Slam	Clay	(United States) Mary Joe Fernández	(United States) Gigi Fernández (Belarus) Natasha Zvereva	6–2, 6–1
Win	9–4	Aug 1996	Los Angeles	Tier II	Hard	(Belarus) Natasha Zvereva	(United States) Amy Frazier (United States) Kimberly Po	6–1, 6–4
Win	10–4	Nov 1996	Oakland, U.S.	Tier II	Hard	(United States) Mary Joe Fernández	(Romania) Irina Spîrlea (France) Nathalie Tauziat	6–1, 6–3
Win	11–4	Nov 1996	WTA Tour Championships, New York City	Finals	Carpet	(United States) Mary Joe Fernández	(Czech Republic) Jana Novotná (Spain) Arantxa Sánchez Vicario	6–3, 6–2
Loss	11–5	Jan 1997	Medibank International Sydney	Tier II	Hard	(Belarus) Natasha Zvereva	(United States) Gigi Fernández (Spain) Arantxa Sánchez Vicario	6–3, 6–1
Loss	11–6	Jan 1997	Australian Open (2)	Grand Slam	Hard	(United States) Lisa Raymond	(Switzerland) Martina Hingis (Belarus) Natasha Zvereva	6–2, 6–2
Win	12–6	Feb 1997	Tokyo (Pan Pacific)	Tier I	Carpet	(Belarus) Natasha Zvereva	(United States) Gigi Fernández (Switzerland) Martina Hingis	6–4, 6–3
Win	13–6	Mar 1997	Indian Wells, U.S.	Tier I	Hard	(Belarus) Natasha Zvereva	(United States) Lisa Raymond (France) Nathalie Tauziat	6–3, 6–2
Loss	13–7	Mar 1997	Family Circle Cup	Tier I	Clay	(Czechoslovakia) Jana Novotná	(Switzerland) Martina Hingis (United States) Mary Joe Fernández	7–5, 4–6, 6–1
Win	14–7	Apr 1997	Amelia Island, U.S.	Tier II	Clay	(Czech Republic) Jana Novotná	(United States) Nicole Arendt (Netherlands) Manon Bollegraf	6–3, 6–0
Win	15–7	May 1997	Berlin, Germany	Tier I	Clay	(Czech Republic) Jana Novotná	(United States) Gigi Fernández (Belarus) Natasha Zvereva	6–2, 3–6, 6–2
Win	16–7	Jul 1997	Stanford, U.S.	Tier II	Hard	(Switzerland) Martina Hingis	(Spain) Conchita Martínez (Argentina) Patricia Tarabini	6–1, 6–3
Win	17–7	Sep 1997	US Open, New York City	Grand Slam	Hard	(Czech Republic) Jana Novotná	(United States) Gigi Fernández (Belarus) Natasha Zvereva	6–3, 6–4
Loss	17–8	Oct 1997	Filderstadt	Tier II	Hard(i)	(Czechoslovakia) Jana Novotná	(Switzerland) Martina Hingis (Spain) Arantxa Sánchez Vicario	7–6^{(7–4)}, 3–6, 7–6^{(7–3)}
Loss	17–9	Nov 1997	Virginia Slims of Chicago	Tier II	Carpet (i)	(United States) Monica Seles	(France) Alexandra Fusai (France) Nathalie Tauziat	6–3, 6–2
Loss	17–10	Nov 1997	Virginia Slims of Philadelphia	Tier II	Carpet (i)	(Czechoslovakia) Jana Novotná	(United States) Lisa Raymond (Australia) Rennae Stubbs	6–3, 7–5
Win	18–10	Nov 1997	WTA Tour Championships, New York City	Finals	Carpet	(Czech Republic) Jana Novotná	(France) Alexandra Fusai (France) Nathalie Tauziat	6–7, 6–3, 6–2
Loss	18–11	Jan 1998	Australian Open (3)	Grand Slam	Hard	(Belarus) Natasha Zvereva	(Switzerland) Martina Hingis (Croatia) Mirjana Lučić	6–4, 2–6, 6–3
Loss	18–12	Feb 1998	Tokyo Pan Pacific (2)	Tier I	Carpet	(Belarus) Natasha Zvereva	(Switzerland) Martina Hingis (Croatia) Mirjana Lučić	7–5, 6–4
Win	19–12	Mar 1998	Indian Wells, U.S.	Tier I	Hard	(Belarus) Natasha Zvereva	(France) Alexandra Fusai (France) Nathalie Tauziat	6–4, 2–6, 6–4
Win	20–12	May 1998	Berlin, Germany	Tier I	Clay	(Belarus) Natasha Zvereva	(France) Alexandra Fusai (France) Nathalie Tauziat	6–3, 6–0
Loss	20–13	May 1998	French Open (2)	Grand Slam	Clay	(Belarus) Natasha Zvereva	(Switzerland) Martina Hingis (Czech Republic) Jana Novotná	6–1, 7–6^{(7–4)}
Loss	20–14	Jun 1998	Wimbledon	Grand Slam	Grass	(Belarus) Natasha Zvereva	(Switzerland) Martina Hingis (Czech Republic) Jana Novotná	6–3, 3–6, 8–6
Win	21–14	Aug 1998	Stanford, U.S.	Tier II	Hard	(Belarus) Natasha Zvereva	(Latvia) Larisa Neiland (Ukraine) Elena Tatarkova	6–4, 6–4
Win	22–14	Aug 1998	San Diego, U.S.	Tier II	Hard	(Belarus) Natasha Zvereva	(France) Alexandra Fusai (France) Nathalie Tauziat	6–2, 6–1
Loss	22–15	Aug 1998	US Open	Grand Slam	Hard	(Belarus) Natasha Zvereva	(Switzerland) Martina Hingis (Czech Republic) Jana Novotná	6–3, 6–3
Win	23–15	Oct 1998	Filderstadt, Germany	Tier II	Hard (i)	(Belarus) Natasha Zvereva	(Russia) Anna Kournikova (Spain) Arantxa Sánchez Vicario	6–4, 6–2
Win	24–15	Nov 1998	WTA Tour Championships, New York City	Finals	Carpet	(Belarus) Natasha Zvereva	(France) Alexandra Fusai (France) Nathalie Tauziat	6–7^{(6–8)}, 7–5, 6–3
Loss	24–16	Jan 1999	Australian Open (4)	Grand Slam	Hard	(Belarus) Natasha Zvereva	(Switzerland) Martina Hingis (Russia) Anna Kournikova	7–5, 6–3
Win	25–16	Feb 1999	Tokyo (Pan Pacific), Japan	Tier I	Carpet	(Belarus) Natasha Zvereva	(Czech Republic) Jana Novotná (Switzerland) Martina Hingis	6–2, 6–3
Win	26–16	Jul 1999	Wimbledon, London, United Kingdom	Grand Slam	Grass	(United States) Corina Morariu	(South Africa) Mariaan de Swardt (Ukraine) Elena Tatarkova	6–4, 6–4
Win	27–16	Aug 1999	Stanford, U.S.	Tier II	Hard	(United States) Corina Morariu	(Russia) Anna Kournikova (Russia) Elena Likhovtseva	6–4, 6–4
Win	28–16	Aug 1999	San Diego, U.S.	Tier II	Hard	(United States) Corina Morariu	(United States) Venus Williams (United States) Serena Williams	6–4, 6–1
Win	29–16	Mar 2000	Indian Wells, U.S.	Tier I	Hard	(United States) Corina Morariu	(Russia) Anna Kournikova (Belarus) Natasha Zvereva	6–2, 6–3
Loss	29–17	Jul 2000	Acura Classic	Tier II	Hard	(Russia) Anna Kournikova	(United States) Lisa Raymond (Australia) Rennae Stubbs	4–6, 6–3, 7–6^{(8–6)}
Loss	29–18	Jan 2001	Australian Open (5)	Grand Slam	Hard	(United States) Corina Morariu	(United States) Serena Williams (United States) Venus Williams	6–2, 2–6, 6–4
Win	30–18	Oct 2001	Filderstadt, Germany	Tier II	Hard (i)	(United States) Lisa Raymond	(Belgium) Justine Henin-Hardenne (United States) Meghann Shaughnessy	6–4, 6–7^{(4–7)}, 7–5
Win	31–18	Oct 2001	Zürich, Switzerland	Tier I	Hard (i)	(United States) Lisa Raymond	(France) Sandrine Testud (Italy) Roberta Vinci	6–3, 2–6, 6–2
Win	32–18	Oct 2002	Filderstadt, Germany	Tier II	Hard (i)	(United States) Lisa Raymond	(Argentina) Paola Suárez (United States) Meghann Shaughnessy	6–2, 6–4
Loss	32–19	Jan 2003	Toray Pan Pacific Open	Tier I	Carpet	(United States) Lisa Raymond	(Russia) Elena Bovina (Australia) Rennae Stubbs	6–3, 6–4
Loss	32–20	Feb 2003	State Farm Women's Tennis Classic	Tier II	Hard	(United States) Lisa Raymond	(Belgium) Kim Clijsters (Japan) Ai Sugiyama	6–1, 6–4
Win	33–20	Mar 2003	Indian Wells, U.S.	Tier I	Hard	(United States) Lisa Raymond	(Belgium) Kim Clijsters (Japan) Ai Sugiyama	3–6, 6–4, 6–1
Win	34–20	Apr 2003	Amelia Island, U.S.	Tier II	Clay	(United States) Lisa Raymond	(Spain) Virginia Ruano Pascual (Argentina) Paola Suárez	7–5, 6–2
Win	35–20	Jun 2003	Eastbourne, United Kingdom	Tier II	Grass	(United States) Lisa Raymond	(United States) Jennifer Capriati (Spain) Magüi Serna	6–3, 6–2
Loss	35–21	Aug 2003	Acura Classic	Tier II	Hard	(United States) Lisa Raymond	(Belgium) Kim Clijsters (Japan) Ai Sugiyama	6–4, 7–5
Loss	35–22	Jan 2005	Australian Open (6)	Grand Slam	Hard	(United States) Corina Morariu	(Russia) Svetlana Kuznetsova (Australia) Alicia Molik	6–3, 6–4
Loss	35–23	Feb 2005	Toray Pan Pacific Open (3)	Tier I	Carpet	(United States) Corina Morariu	(Slovakia) Janette Husárová (Russia) Elena Likhovtseva	6–4, 6–3
Win	36–23	Sep 2006	Bali, Indonesia	Tier III	Hard	(United States) Corina Morariu	(South Africa) Natalie Grandin (Australia) Trudi Musgrave	6–3, 6–4
Win	37–23	Mar 2008	Memphis, Tennessee, U.S.	Tier III	Hard	(United States) Lisa Raymond	(United States) Angela Haynes (United States) Mashona Washington	6–3, 6–1
Win	38–23	Aug 2010	Stanford, California, U.S.	Premier	Hard	(United States) Liezel Huber	(Chinese Taipei) Chan Yung-jan (China) Zheng Jie	7–5, 6–7^{(8–10)}, [10–8]

== WTA tour career earnings ==
Year	Earnings ($)	Money list rank
1991	10,613	263
1992	34,761	n/a
1993	201,409	32
1994	600,745	10
1995	438,682	15
1996	871,393	8
1997	1,533,101	3
1998	3,052,105	2
1999	2,734,205	2
2000	2,444,734	2
2001	2,102,242	4
2002	805,191	12
2003	1,632,909	5
2004	2,220,005	3
2005	2,684,490	3
2006	384,188	36
2007	85,664	153
2008	295,418	54
Career	22,166,338	4

== Record against top 10 players ==
=== Top 10 wins ===
Season	1993	1994	1995	1996	1997	1998	1999	2000	2001	2002	2003	2004	2005	2006	2007	2008	Total
Wins	1	7	4	14	7	17	15	14	17	4	5	10	10	2	1	2	130

#	Player	vsRank	Event	Surface	Round	Score
1993
1.	(Argentina) Gabriela Sabatini	5	Delray Beach, United States	Hard	3R	7–6, 6–1
1994
2.	(United States) Mary Joe Fernández	5	Australian Open, Melbourne, Australia	Hard	4R	6–2, 6–7^{(4–7)}, 6–2
3.	(Argentina) Gabriela Sabatini	5	Miami, United States	Hard	QF	6–2, 6–1
4.	(Spain) Conchita Martínez	3	Amelia Island, United States	Clay	QF	4–6, 6–4, 7–6
5.	(Argentina) Gabriela Sabatini	10	Wimbledon, London, United Kingdom	Grass	4R	6–1, 6–3
6.	(France) Mary Pierce	7	Fed Cup, Frankfurt, Germany	Clay	SF	5–7, 6–2, 6–2
7.	(Czech Republic) Jana Novotná	4	WTA Tour Championships, New York, United States	Carpet (i)	QF	6–2, 6–2
8.	(France) Mary Pierce	5	WTA Tour Championships, New York, United States	Carpet (i)	SF	6–3, 6–2
1995
9.	(Japan) Kimiko Date	8	Sydney, Australia	Hard	SF	6–4, 4–1, ret.
10.	(Germany) Anke Huber	9	Tokyo, Japan	Carpet (i)	QF	2–6, 6–4, 6–2
11.	(Japan) Kimiko Date	9	Strasbourg, France	Clay	F	3–6, 6–1, 6–2
12.	(France) Mary Pierce	4	Fed Cup, Wilmington, United States	Carpet (i)	SF	6–3, 4–6, 6–0
1996
13.	(Japan) Kimiko Date	5	Sydney, Australia	Hard	SF	6–2, 4–6, 7–5
14.	(United States) Chanda Rubin	9	Indian Wells, United States	Hard	QF	6–0, 6–3
15.	(Germany) Anke Huber	5	Miami, United States	Hard	QF	6–0, 6–1
16.	(Japan) Kimiko Date	9	French Open, Paris, France	Clay	4R	3–6, 6–4, 8–6
17.	(Japan) Kimiko Date	9	Fed Cup, Nagoya, Japan	Carpet (i)	SF	6–2, 6–1
18.	(Germany) Anke Huber	5	Summer Olympics, Atlanta, United States	Hard	3R	6–1, 3–6, 6–3
19.	(Croatia) Iva Majoli	4	Summer Olympics, Atlanta, United States	Hard	QF	7–5, 6–3
20.	(United States) Mary Joe Fernandez	8	Summer Olympics, Atlanta, United States	Hard	SF	6–2, 7–6^{(8–6)}
21.	(Spain) Arantxa Sánchez Vicario	3	Summer Olympics, Atlanta, United States	Hard	F	7–6^{(10–8)}, 6–2
22.	(Germany) Steffi Graf	1	Manhattan Beach, United States	Hard	SF	6–3, 6–3
23.	(Germany) Anke Huber	5	Manhattan Beach, United States	Hard	F	6–2, 6–3
24.	(Spain) Arantxa Sánchez Vicario	2	Fed Cup, Atlantic City, United States	Carpet (i)	F	7–5, 6–1
25.	(Czech Republic) Jana Novotná	8	Filderstadt, Germany	Hard (i)	QF	6–3, 6–4
26.	(Austria) Barbara Paulus	10	WTA Tour Championships, New York, United States	Carpet (i)	1R	6–3, 6–2
1997
27.	(Switzerland) Martina Hingis	1	Manhattan Beach, United States	Hard	SF	6–2, 4–6, 6–4
28.	(South Africa) Amanda Coetzer	5	Atlanta, United States	Hard	SF	6–2, 6–4
29.	(Czech Republic) Jana Novotná	3	US Open, New York, United States	Hard	QF	6–2, 4–6, 7–6^{(7–5)}
30.	(Czech Republic) Jana Novotná	2	Zurich, Switzerland	Hard (i)	SF	6–4, 6–1
31.	(Spain) Conchita Martínez	10	Philadelphia, United States	Carpet (i)	2R	6–3, 6–0
32.	(Czech Republic) Jana Novotná	2	Philadelphia, United States	Carpet (i)	QF	6–3, 6–2
33.	(Romania) Irina Spîrlea	8	Philadelphia, United States	Carpet (i)	SF	6–2, 6–4
1998
34.	(Romania) Irina Spîrlea	10	Tokyo, Japan	Carpet (i)	QF	7–6, 7–6
35.	(South Africa) Amanda Coetzer	6	Tokyo, Japan	Carpet (i)	SF	6–2, 6–1
36.	(Switzerland) Martina Hingis	1	Tokyo, Japan	Carpet (i)	F	6–3, 6–3
37.	(Croatia) Iva Majoli	10	French Open, Paris, France	Clay	QF	6–1, 5–7, 6–3
38.	(United States) Venus Williams	5	Stanford, United States	Hard	F	6–4, 5–7, 6–4
39.	(France) Nathalie Tauziat	9	San Diego, United States	Hard	QF	6–4, 6–3
40.	(United States) Monica Seles	6	San Diego, United States	Hard	SF	6–4, 2–6, 7–5
41.	(United States) Monica Seles	6	Manhattan Beach, United States	Hard	SF	6–4, 6–2
42.	(Switzerland) Martina Hingis	1	Manhattan Beach, United States	Hard	F	4–6, 6–4, 6–3
43.	(France) Nathalie Tauziat	9	US Open, New York, United States	Hard	4R	6–1, 6–4
44.	(United States) Venus Williams	5	US Open, New York, United States	Hard	SF	6–4, 6–4
45.	(Switzerland) Martina Hingis	1	US Open, New York, United States	Hard	F	6–3, 7–5
46.	(France) Nathalie Tauziat	8	Filderstadt, Germany	Hard (i)	QF	7–6, 7–5
47.	(Spain) Arantxa Sánchez Vicario	4	Filderstadt, Germany	Hard (i)	SF	7–6, 6–4
48.	(United States) Venus Williams	5	Zurich, Switzerland	Hard (i)	F	7–5, 6–3
49.	(United States) Monica Seles	6	Philadelphia, United States	Carpet (i)	SF	6–3, 6–3
50.	(France) Nathalie Tauziat	8	WTA Tour Championships, New York, United States	Carpet (i)	QF	6–0, 6–3
1999
51.	(Switzerland) Patty Schnyder	8	Sydney, Australia	Hard	QF	6–2, 6–3
52.	(Germany) Steffi Graf	10	Sydney, Australia	Hard	SF	6–2, 7–5
53.	(Switzerland) Martina Hingis	2	Sydney, Australia	Hard	F	6–4, 6–3
54.	(United States) Venus Williams	6	Australian Open, Melbourne, Australia	Hard	QF	6–4, 6–0
55.	(Czech Republic) Jana Novotná	6	Wimbledon, London, United Kingdom	Grass	QF	6–3, 6–4
56.	(Germany) Steffi Graf	3	Wimbledon, London, United Kingdom	Grass	F	6–4, 7–5
57.	(United States) Venus Williams	4	Stanford, United States	Hard	F	7–6^{(7–1)}, 6–2
58.	(France) Mary Pierce	5	US Open, New York, United States	Hard	QF	6–2, 3–6, 7–5
59.	(United States) Monica Seles	5	Tokyo, Japan	Hard	F	7–5, 7–6^{(7–1)}
60.	(France) Julie Halard-Decugis	9	Philadelphia, United States	Carpet (i)	QF	4–6, 6–2, 6–1
61.	(United States) Venus Williams	3	Philadelphia, United States	Carpet (i)	SF	6–1, 6–2
62.	(Switzerland) Martina Hingis	1	Philadelphia, United States	Carpet (i)	F	6–3, 6–4
63.	(France) Amélie Mauresmo	10	WTA Tour Championships, New York, United States	Carpet (i)	1R	3–6, 6–3, 6–2
64.	(France) Nathalie Tauziat	7	WTA Tour Championships, New York, United States	Carpet (i)	SF	7–6^{(7–3)}, 6–0
65.	(Switzerland) Martina Hingis	1	WTA Tour Championships, New York, United States	Carpet (i)	F	6–4, 6–2
2000
66.	(Switzerland) Martina Hingis	1	Australian Open, Melbourne, Australia	Hard	F	6–1, 7–5
67.	(United States) Monica Seles	9	Scottsdale, United States	Hard	QF	6–4, 6–4
68.	(Russia) Anna Kournikova	10	Scottsdale, United States	Hard	SF	6–2, 6–2
69.	(France) Julie Halard-Decugis	10	Indian Wells, United States	Hard	4R	6–2, 6–1
70.	(Spain) Conchita Martínez	7	Indian Wells, United States	Hard	QF	6–2, 6–1
71.	(Switzerland) Martina Hingis	1	Indian Wells, United States	Hard	F	4–6, 6–4, 6–0
72.	(United States) Monica Seles	6	Wimbledon, London, United Kingdom	Grass	QF	6–7^{(4–7)}, 6–4, 6–0
73.	(United States) Monica Seles	5	Stanford, United States	Hard	SF	7–5, 7–6^{(7–2)}
74.	(United States) Serena Williams	5	US Open, New York, United States	Hard	QF	6–4, 6–2
75.	(United States) Venus Williams	3	Linz, Austria	Carpet (i)	F	6–4, 3–6, 6–2
76.	(Spain) Conchita Martínez	5	Philadelphia, United States	Carpet (i)	SF	6–0, 6–1
77.	(Switzerland) Martina Hingis	1	Philadelphia, United States	Carpet (i)	F	7–6^{(9–7)}, 6–4
78.	(Spain) Arantxa Sánchez Vicario	9	Fed Cup, Las Vegas, United States	Carpet (i)	F	6–2, 1–6, 6–3
79.	(Spain) Conchita Martínez	5	Fed Cup, Las Vegas, United States	Carpet (i)	F	6–1, 6–2
2001
80.	(Russia) Anna Kournikova	8	Australian Open, Melbourne, Australia	Hard	QF	6–4, 6–2
81.	(Russia) Anna Kournikova	9	Tokyo, Japan	Carpet (i)	SF	6–1, 6–7^{(5–7)}, 6–0
82.	(Switzerland) Martina Hingis	1	Tokyo, Japan	Carpet (i)	F	6–7^{(4–7)}, 6–4, 6–2
83.	(United States) Jennifer Capriati	5	Scottsdale, United States	Hard	SF	6–4, 6–7^{(2–7)}, 6–1
84.	(Belgium) Kim Clijsters	7	Wimbledon, London, United Kingdom	Grass	QF	6–1, 6–2
85.	(United States) Monica Seles	10	Stanford, United States	Hard	SF	6–4, 6–2
86.	(France) Nathalie Tauziat	9	Los Angeles, United States	Hard	SF	6–1, 6–2
87.	(United States) Monica Seles	10	Los Angeles, United States	Hard	F	6–3, 7–5
88.	(France) Amélie Mauresmo	8	New Haven, United States	Hard	QF	6–4, 6–4
89.	(France) Amélie Mauresmo	6	Filderstadt, Germany	Hard (i)	QF	6–4, 6–2
90.	(Switzerland) Martina Hingis	1	Filderstadt, Germany	Hard (i)	SF	2–1, ret.
91.	(Belgium) Justine Henin	7	Filderstadt, Germany	Hard (i)	F	7–5, 6–4
92.	(United States) Jennifer Capriati	1	Zurich, Switzerland	Hard (i)	SF	6–1, 5–7, 6–2
93.	(Federal Republic of Yugoslavia) Jelena Dokic	10	Zurich, Switzerland	Hard (i)	F	6–3, 6–1
94.	(Federal Republic of Yugoslavia) Jelena Dokic	9	Linz, Austria	Hard (i)	F	6–4, 6–1
95.	(Federal Republic of Yugoslavia) Jelena Dokic	8	WTA Tour Championships, Munich, Germany	Hard (i)	QF	6–4, 6–2
96.	(Belgium) Kim Clijsters	5	WTA Tour Championships, Munich, Germany	Hard (i)	SF	1–6, 6–3, 7–6^{(7–3)}
2002
97.	(Federal Republic of Yugoslavia) Jelena Dokic	6	Stanford, United States	Hard	QF	6–2, 6–2
98.	(France) Amélie Mauresmo	9	New Haven, United States	Hard	QF	7–6^{(9–7)}, 6–3
99.	(Belgium) Kim Clijsters	5	Zurich, Switzerland	Hard (i)	QF	6–3, 7–6^{(7–5)}
100.	(Belgium) Justine Henin	9	Zurich, Switzerland	Hard (i)	SF	7–6^{(7–2)}, 7–6^{(7–5)}
2003
101.	(Slovakia) Daniela Hantuchová	8	Sydney, Australia	Hard	QF	6–4, 3–6, 7–6^{(7–3)}
102.	(United States) Monica Seles	9	Tokyo, Japan	Carpet (i)	F	6–7^{(6–8)}, 6–1, 6–2
103.	(United States) Jennifer Capriati	6	Indian Wells, United States	Hard	SF	6–4, 4–6, 6–4
104.	(United States) Jennifer Capriati	6	Amelia Island, United States	Clay	SF	6–3, 5–7, 6–2
105.	(United States) Chanda Rubin	8	San Diego, United States	Hard	QF	6–3, 6–3
2004
106.	(Russia) Elena Dementieva	8	Sydney, Australia	Hard	QF	6–3, 6–4
107.	(Russia) Nadia Petrova	9	Amelia Island, United States	Clay	SF	3–6, 6–4, 6–1
108.	(France) Amélie Mauresmo	3	Amelia Island, United States	Clay	F	6–4, 6–4
109.	(Russia) Elena Dementieva	6	San Diego, United States	Hard	SF	6–2, 6–4
110.	(Russia) Anastasia Myskina	5	San Diego, United States	Hard	F	6–1, 6–1
111.	(Russia) Vera Zvonareva	9	Cincinnati, United States	Hard	F	6–3, 6–2
112.	(Russia) Anastasia Myskina	4	Filderstadt, Germany	Hard (i)	SF	6–2, 6–4
113.	(France) Amélie Mauresmo	1	Filderstadt, Germany	Hard (i)	F	6–2, ret.
114.	(Russia) Elena Dementieva	5	WTA Tour Championships, Los Angeles, United States	Hard (i)	RR	6–0, 6–1
115.	(United States) Serena Williams	8	WTA Tour Championships, Los Angeles, United States	Hard (i)	RR	3–6, 7–5, 6–1
2005
116.	(Russia) Svetlana Kuznetsova	6	Tokyo, Japan	Carpet (i)	SF	6–1, 7–6^{(7–2)}
117.	(Russia) Maria Sharapova	3	Indian Wells, United States	Hard	SF	6–0, 6–0
118.	(United States) Venus Williams	8	Amelia Island, United States	Clay	QF	1–6, 6–3, 6–4
119.	(Russia) Svetlana Kuznetsova	6	Wimbledon, London, United Kingdom	Grass	QF	7–6^{(7–1)}, 6–3
120.	(France) Amélie Mauresmo	3	Wimbledon, London, United Kingdom	Grass	SF	6–7^{(5–7)}, 7–6^{(7–4)}, 6–4
121.	(France) Amélie Mauresmo	3	New Haven, United States	Hard	F	6–4, 6–4
122.	(France) Amélie Mauresmo	4	Filderstadt, Germany	Hard (i)	F	6–2, 6–4
123.	(Switzerland) Patty Schnyder	10	Zurich, Switzerland	Hard (i)	F	7–6^{(7–5)}, 6–3
124.	(Switzerland) Patty Schnyder	8	WTA Tour Championships, Los Angeles, United States	Hard (i)	RR	6–3, 7–5
125.	(Russia) Nadia Petrova	10	WTA Tour Championships, Los Angeles, United States	Hard (i)	RR	6–2, 7–6^{(7–1)}
2006
126.	(France) Amélie Mauresmo	1	New Haven, United States	Hard	QF	6–4, 7–5
127.	(Switzerland) Patty Schnyder	8	US Open, New York, United States	Hard	4R	6–4, 6–4
2007
128.	(Serbia) Jelena Janković	3	Bali, Indonesia	Hard	QF	6–4, 2–6, 6–2
2008
129.	(France) Marion Bartoli	10	Indian Wells, United States	Hard	4R	6–2, 7–5
130.	(Serbia) Ana Ivanovic	2	Miami, United States	Hard	3R	6–4, 6–2

== Longest winning streak ==
=== 22-match win streak (2004) ===
#	Tournament	Category	Start date	Surface	Rd	Opponent	Rank	Score
–	Wimbledon Championships	Grand Slam	21 June 2004	Grass	SF	(Russia) Maria Sharapova (13)	15	6–2, 6–7^{(5–7)}, 1–6
1	Stanford Classic	Tier II	12 July 2004	Hard	2R	(Russia) Lioudmila Skavronskaia (Q)	135	6–1, 6–1
2	Stanford Classic	Tier II	12 July 2004	Hard	QF	(United States) Mashona Washington (LL)	101	6–4, 3–6, 6–1
3	Stanford Classic	Tier II	12 July 2004	Hard	SF	(Venezuela) María Vento-Kabchi (8)	32	6–3, 6–2
4	Stanford Classic	Tier II	12 July 2004	Hard	F	(United States) Venus Williams (1/PR)	15	7–6^{(7–4)}, 5–7, 7–6^{(7–4)}
5	Los Angeles Open	Tier II	19 July 2004	Hard	2R	(Luxembourg) Anne Kremer (LL)	126	7–5, 6–2
6	Los Angeles Open	Tier II	19 July 2004	Hard	3R	(United States) Amy Frazier (15)	23	6–2, 6–4
7	Los Angeles Open	Tier II	19 July 2004	Hard	QF	(Russia) Nadia Petrova (7)	12	6–1, 6–1
8	Los Angeles Open	Tier II	19 July 2004	Hard	SF	(United States) Venus Williams (2/PR)	13	7–5, 2–0, ret.
9	Los Angeles Open	Tier II	19 July 2004	Hard	F	(United States) Serena Williams (1/PR)	16	6–1, 6–3
10	Southern California Open	Tier I	25 July 2004	Hard	2R	(Croatia) Karolina Šprem	20	6–4, 6–0
11	Southern California Open	Tier I	25 July 2004	Hard	3R	(Spain) Conchita Martínez	39	6–1, 6–2
12	Southern California Open	Tier I	25 July 2004	Hard	QF	(Japan) Ai Sugiyama (8)	11	6–1, 6–3
13	Southern California Open	Tier I	25 July 2004	Hard	SF	(Russia) Elena Dementieva (5)	6	6–2, 6–4
14	Southern California Open	Tier I	25 July 2004	Hard	F	(Russia) Anastasia Myskina (3)	5	6–1, 6–1
15	Cincinnati Masters	Tier III	16 August 2004	Hard	2R	(United States) Lilia Osterloh (WC)	137	4–6, 6–4, 6–1
16	Cincinnati Masters	Tier III	16 August 2004	Hard	QF	(Italy) Flavia Pennetta (7)	68	6–2, 6–2
–	Cincinnati Masters	Tier III	16 August 2004	Hard	SF	(France) Marion Bartoli (4)	56	Walkover
17	Cincinnati Masters	Tier III	16 August 2004	Hard	F	(Russia) Vera Zvonareva (2)	9	6–3, 6–2
18	US Open	Grand Slam	30 August 2004	Hard	1R	(Slovakia) Ľubomíra Kurhajcová	73	6–4, 6–0
19	US Open	Grand Slam	30 August 2004	Hard	2R	(Spain) Arantxa Parra Santonja	57	6–4, 6–2
20	US Open	Grand Slam	30 August 2004	Hard	3R	(Russia) Elena Bovina (26)	19	7–6^{(9–7)}, 6–2
21	US Open	Grand Slam	30 August 2004	Hard	4R	(United States) Venus Williams (11)	12	7–5, 6–4
22	US Open	Grand Slam	30 August 2004	Hard	QF	(Japan) Shinobu Asagoe	62	6–1, 6–1
–	US Open	Grand Slam	30 August 2004	Hard	SF	(Russia) Svetlana Kuznetsova (9)	9	6–1, 2–6, 4–6
