= List of WTA Tour top-level tournament singles champions =

This is a list of the women's singles tennis champions at the Grand Slam tournaments, the WTA championships, the Olympic Games, and the WTA Tier I/Premier (Premier Mandatory and Premier Five)/1000 tournaments since 1990.

== Champions list ==
Year	Grand Slam tournaments				Tier I tournaments										WTA Finals	Olympics
Year	AO	FO	WI	UO	SD/DO	ZU/DU	CO/BR/IW	MI	BE/MA	RO	CA	HH/CH/CI	TO/WU/GU	PH/MO/BG	WTA Finals	Olympics
1990	(West Germany) Graf*	(Socialist Federal Republic of Yugoslavia) Seles*	(United States) Navratilova*	(Argentina) Sabatini*	not Tier I	not Tier I	(United States) Navratilova*	(Socialist Federal Republic of Yugoslavia) Seles*	(Socialist Federal Republic of Yugoslavia) Seles*	(Socialist Federal Republic of Yugoslavia) Seles*	(West Germany) Graf*	(United States) Navratilova*	not Tier I	not an event	(Socialist Federal Republic of Yugoslavia) Seles*	not held
1991	(Socialist Federal Republic of Yugoslavia) Seles*	(Socialist Federal Republic of Yugoslavia) Seles*	(Germany) Graf*	(Socialist Federal Republic of Yugoslavia) Seles*	not Tier I	not Tier I	(Argentina) Sabatini*	(Socialist Federal Republic of Yugoslavia) Seles*	(Germany) Graf*	(Argentina) Sabatini*	(United States) Capriati*	(Argentina) Sabatini*	not Tier I	not Tier I	(Socialist Federal Republic of Yugoslavia) Seles*	not held
1992	(Socialist Federal Republic of Yugoslavia) Seles*	(Federal Republic of Yugoslavia) Seles*	(Germany) Graf*	(Federal Republic of Yugoslavia) Seles*	not Tier I	not Tier I	(Germany) Graf*	(Spain) Sánchez-Vicario*	(Germany) Graf*	(Argentina) Sabatini*	(Spain) Sánchez-Vicario*	(Argentina) Sabatini*	not Tier I	not Tier I	(Federal Republic of Yugoslavia) Seles*	(United States) Capriati*
1993	(Federal Republic of Yugoslavia) Seles*	(Germany) Graf*	(Germany) Graf*	(Germany) Graf*	not Tier I	(Switzerland) Maleeva-Fragnière*	not Tier I	(Spain) Sánchez-Vicario*	(Germany) Graf*	(Spain) Martínez*	(Germany) Graf*	(Germany) Graf*	(United States) Navratilova*	(Spain) Martínez*	(Germany) Graf*	not held
1994	(Germany) Graf*	(Spain) Sánchez-Vicario*	(Spain) Martínez*	(Spain) Sánchez-Vicario*	not Tier I	(Bulgaria) Mag. Maleeva*	not Tier I	(Germany) Graf*	(Germany) Graf*	(Spain) Martínez*	(Spain) Sánchez-Vicario*	(Spain) Martínez*	(Germany) Graf*	(Germany) Huber*	(Argentina) Sabatini*	not held
1995	(France) Pierce*	(Germany) Graf*	(Germany) Graf*	(Germany) Graf*	not Tier I	(Croatia) Majoli*	not Tier I	(Germany) Graf*	(Spain) Sánchez-Vicario*	(Spain) Martínez*	(United States) Seles*	(Spain) Martínez*	(Japan) Date*	(Germany) Graf*	(Germany) Graf*	not held
1996	(United States) Seles*	(Germany) Graf*	(Germany) Graf*	(Germany) Graf*	not Tier I	(Czech Republic) Novotná*	(Germany) Graf*	(Germany) Graf*	(Germany) Graf*	(Spain) Martínez*	(United States) Seles*	(Spain) Sánchez-Vicario*	(Croatia) Majoli*	not Tier I	(Germany) Graf*	(United States) Davenport*
1997	(Switzerland) Hingis*	(Croatia) Majoli*	(Switzerland) Hingis*	(Switzerland) Hingis*	not Tier I	(United States) Davenport*	(United States) Davenport*	(Switzerland) Hingis*	(United States) M. J. Fernández*	(France) Pierce*	(United States) Seles*	(Switzerland) Hingis*	(Switzerland) Hingis*	(Czech Republic) Novotná*	(Czech Republic) Novotná*	not held
1998	(Switzerland) Hingis*	(Spain) Sánchez-Vicario*	(Czech Republic) Novotná*	(United States) Davenport*	not Tier I	(United States) Davenport*	(Switzerland) Hingis*	(United States) V. Williams*	(Spain) Martínez*	(Switzerland) Hingis*	(United States) Seles*	(South Africa) Coetzer*	(United States) Davenport*	(France) Pierce*	(Switzerland) Hingis*	not held
1999	(Switzerland) Hingis*	(Germany) Graf*	(United States) Davenport*	(United States) S. Williams*	not Tier I	(United States) V. Williams*	(United States) S. Williams*	(United States) V. Williams*	(Switzerland) Hingis*	(United States) V. Williams*	(Switzerland) Hingis*	(Switzerland) Hingis*	(Switzerland) Hingis*	(France) Tauziat*	(United States) Davenport*	not held
2000	(United States) Davenport*	(France) Pierce*	(United States) V. Williams*	(United States) V. Williams*	not Tier I	(Switzerland) Hingis*	(United States) Davenport*	(Switzerland) Hingis*	(Spain) Martínez*	(United States) Seles*	(Switzerland) Hingis*	(France) Pierce*	(Switzerland) Hingis*	(Switzerland) Hingis*	(Switzerland) Hingis*	(United States) V. Williams*
2001	(United States) Capriati*	(United States) Capriati*	(United States) V. Williams*	(United States) V. Williams*	not Tier I	(United States) Davenport*	(United States) S. Williams*	(United States) V. Williams*	(France) Mauresmo*	(Federal Republic of Yugoslavia) Dokic*	(United States) S. Williams*	(United States) Capriati*	(United States) Davenport*	(Federal Republic of Yugoslavia) Dokic*	(United States) S. Williams*	not held
2002	(United States) Capriati*	(United States) S. Williams*	(United States) S. Williams*	(United States) S. Williams*	not Tier I	(Switzerland) Schnyder*	(Slovakia) Hantuchová*	(United States) S. Williams*	(Belgium) Henin*	(United States) S. Williams*	(France) Mauresmo*	(Croatia) Majoli*	(Switzerland) Hingis*	(Bulgaria) Mag. Maleeva*	(Belgium) Clijsters*	not held
2003	(United States) S. Williams*	(Belgium) Henin*	(United States) S. Williams*	(Belgium) Henin*	not Tier I	(Belgium) Henin*	(Belgium) Clijsters*	(United States) S. Williams*	(Belgium) Henin*	(Belgium) Clijsters*	(Belgium) Henin*	(Belgium) Henin*	(United States) Davenport*	(Russia) Myskina*	(Belgium) Clijsters*	not held
2004	(Belgium) Henin*	(Russia) Myskina*	(Russia) Sharapova*	(Russia) Kuznetsova*	(United States) Davenport*	(Australia) Molik*	(Belgium) Henin*	(United States) S. Williams*	(France) Mauresmo*	(France) Mauresmo*	(France) Mauresmo*	(United States) V. Williams*	(United States) Davenport*	(Russia) Myskina*	(Russia) Sharapova*	(Belgium) Henin*
2005	(United States) S. Williams*	(Belgium) Henin*	(United States) V. Williams*	(Belgium) Clijsters*	(France) Pierce*	(United States) Davenport*	(Belgium) Clijsters*	(Belgium) Clijsters*	(Belgium) Henin*	(France) Mauresmo*	(Belgium) Clijsters*	(Belgium) Henin*	(Russia) Sharapova*	(France) Pierce*	(France) Mauresmo*	not held
2006	(France) Mauresmo*	(Belgium) Henin*	(France) Mauresmo*	(Russia) Sharapova*	(Russia) Sharapova*	(Russia) Sharapova*	(Russia) Sharapova*	(Russia) Kuznetsova*	(Russia) Petrova*	(Switzerland) Hingis*	(Serbia) Ivanovic*	(Russia) Petrova*	(Russia) Dementieva*	(Russia) Chakvetadze*	(Belgium) Henin*	not held
2007	(United States) S. Williams*	(Belgium) Henin*	(United States) V. Williams*	(Belgium) Henin*	(Russia) Sharapova*	(Belgium) Henin*	(Slovakia) Hantuchová*	(United States) S. Williams*	(Serbia) Ivanovic*	(Serbia) Janković*	(Belgium) Henin*	(Serbia) Janković*	(Switzerland) Hingis*	(Russia) Dementieva*	(Belgium) Henin*	not held
2008	(Russia) Sharapova*	(Serbia) Ivanovic*	(United States) V. Williams*	(United States) S. Williams*	(Russia) Sharapova*	not Tier I	(Serbia) Ivanovic*	(United States) S. Williams*	(Russia) Safina*	(Serbia) Janković*	(Russia) Safina*	(United States) S. Williams*	(Russia) Safina*	(Serbia) Janković*	(United States) V. Williams*	(Russia) Dementieva*
2009	(United States) S. Williams*	(Russia) Kuznetsova*	(United States) S. Williams*	(Belgium) Clijsters*	not an event	(United States) V. Williams*	(Russia) Zvonareva*	(Belarus) Azarenka*	(Russia) Safina*	(Russia) Safina*	(Russia) Dementieva*	(Serbia) Janković*	(Russia) Sharapova*	(Russia) Kuznetsova*	(United States) S. Williams*	not held
2010	(United States) S. Williams*	(Italy) Schiavone*	(United States) S. Williams*	(Belgium) Clijsters*	not an event	(United States) V. Williams*	(Serbia) Janković*	(Belgium) Clijsters*	(France) Rezaï*	(Spain) Martínez Sánchez*	(Denmark) Wozniacki*	(Belgium) Clijsters*	(Denmark) Wozniacki*	(Denmark) Wozniacki*	(Belgium) Clijsters*	not held
2011	(Belgium) Clijsters*	(China) N. Li*	(Czech Republic) Kvitová*	(Australia) Stosur*	not Tier I	(Denmark) Wozniacki*	(Denmark) Wozniacki*	(Belarus) Azarenka*	(Czech Republic) Kvitová*	(Russia) Sharapova*	(United States) S. Williams*	(Russia) Sharapova*	(Poland) Radwańska*	(Poland) Radwańska*	(Czech Republic) Kvitová*	not held
2012	(Belarus) Azarenka*	(Russia) Sharapova*	(United States) S. Williams*	(United States) S. Williams*	(Belarus) Azarenka*	not Tier I	(Belarus) Azarenka*	(Poland) Radwańska*	(United States) S. Williams*	(Russia) Sharapova*	(Czech Republic) Kvitová*	(China) N. Li*	(Russia) Petrova*	(Belarus) Azarenka*	(United States) S. Williams*	(United States) S. Williams*
2013	(Belarus) Azarenka*	(United States) S. Williams*	(France) Bartoli*	(United States) S. Williams*	(Belarus) Azarenka*	not Tier I	(Russia) Sharapova*	(United States) S. Williams*	(United States) S. Williams*	(United States) S. Williams*	(United States) S. Williams*	(Belarus) Azarenka*	(Czech Republic) Kvitová*	(United States) S. Williams*	(United States) S. Williams*	not held
2014	(China) N. Li*	(Russia) Sharapova*	(Czech Republic) Kvitová*	(United States) S. Williams*	(Romania) Halep*	not Tier I	(Italy) Pennetta*	(United States) S. Williams*	(Russia) Sharapova*	(United States) S. Williams*	(Poland) Radwańska*	(United States) S. Williams*	(Czech Republic) Kvitová*	(Russia) Sharapova*	(United States) S. Williams*	not held
2015	(United States) S. Williams*	(United States) S. Williams*	(United States) S. Williams*	(Italy) Pennetta*	not Tier I	(Romania) Halep*	(Romania) Halep*	(United States) S. Williams*	(Czech Republic) Kvitová*	(Russia) Sharapova*	(Switzerland) Bencic*	(United States) S. Williams*	(United States) V. Williams*	(Spain) Muguruza*	(Poland) Radwańska*	not held
2016	(Germany) Kerber*	(Spain) Muguruza*	(United States) S. Williams*	(Germany) Kerber*	(Spain) Suárez Navarro*	not Tier I	(Belarus) Azarenka*	(Belarus) Azarenka*	(Romania) Halep*	(United States) S. Williams*	(Romania) Halep*	(Czech Republic) Plíšková*	(Czech Republic) Kvitová*	(Poland) Radwańska*	(Slovakia) Cibulková*	(Puerto Rico) Puig*
2017	(United States) S. Williams*	(Latvia) Ostapenko*	(Spain) Muguruza*	(United States) Stephens*	not Tier I	(Ukraine) Svitolina*	(Russia) Vesnina*	(United Kingdom) Konta*	(Romania) Halep*	(Ukraine) Svitolina*	(Ukraine) Svitolina*	(Spain) Muguruza*	(France) Garcia*	(France) Garcia*	(Denmark) Wozniacki*	not held
2018	(Denmark) Wozniacki*	(Romania) Halep*	(Germany) Kerber*	(Japan) Osaka*	(Czech Republic) Kvitová*	not Tier I	(Japan) Osaka*	(United States) Stephens*	(Czech Republic) Kvitová*	(Ukraine) Svitolina*	(Romania) Halep*	(Netherlands) Bertens*	(Belarus) Sabalenka*	(Denmark) Wozniacki*	(Ukraine) Svitolina*	not held
2019	(Japan) Osaka*	(Australia) Barty*	(Romania) Halep*	(Canada) Andreescu*	not Tier I	(Switzerland) Bencic*	(Canada) Andreescu*	(Australia) Barty*	(Netherlands) Bertens*	(Czech Republic) Plíšková*	(Canada) Andreescu*	(United States) Keys*	(Belarus) Sabalenka*	(Japan) Osaka*	(Australia) Barty*	not held
2020	(United States) Kenin*	(Poland) Świątek*	not held (Note: not held due to the COVID-19 pandemic.)	(Japan) Osaka*	(Belarus) Sabalenka*	not Tier I	not held due to the COVID-19 pandemic			(Romania) Halep*	not held	(Belarus) Azarenka*	not held		not held	not held
2021	(Japan) Osaka*	(Czech Republic) Krejčíková*	(Australia) Barty*	(United Kingdom) Raducanu*	not Tier I	(Spain) Muguruza*	(Spain) Badosa*	(Australia) Barty*	(Belarus) Sabalenka*	(Poland) Świątek*	(Italy) Giorgi*	(Australia) Barty*	not held		(Spain) Muguruza*	(Switzerland) Bencic*
2022	(Australia) Barty*	(Poland) Świątek*	(Kazakhstan) Rybakina*	(Poland) Świątek*	(Poland) Świątek*	not Tier I	(Poland) Świątek*	(Poland) Świątek*	(Tunisia) Jabeur*	(Poland) Świątek*	(Romania) Halep*	(France) Garcia*	(United States) Pegula*	not held (Note: not held due to Peng Shuai allegation.)	(France) Garcia*	not held
2023	(Note: On 1 March 2022, the WTA announced that players from Russia and Belarus will not be allowed to compete under the name or flag of Russia or Belarus following the 2022 Russian invasion of Ukraine.) Sabalenka*	(Poland) Świątek*	(Czech Republic) Vondrousova*	(United States) Gauff*	not Tier I	(Czech Republic) Krejčíková*	(Kazakhstan) Rybakina*	(Czech Republic) Kvitová*	Sabalenka*	(Kazakhstan) Rybakina*	(United States) Pegula*	(United States) Gauff*	(Greece) Sakkari*	(Poland) Świątek*	(Poland) Świątek*	not held
2024	Sabalenka*	(Poland) Świątek*	(Czech Republic) Krejčíková*	Sabalenka*	(Poland) Świątek*	(Italy) Paolini*	(Poland) Świątek*	(United States) Collins*	(Poland) Świątek*	(Poland) Świątek*	(United States) Pegula*	Sabalenka*	Sabalenka*	(United States) Gauff*	(United States) Gauff*	(China) Zheng*
2025	(United States) Keys*	(United States) Gauff*	(Poland) Świątek*	Sabalenka*	(United States) Anisimova*	(Note: On 1 March 2022, the WTA announced that players from Russia and Belarus will not be allowed to compete under their nations' names or flags following the 2022 Russian invasion of Ukraine.) Andreeva*	Andreeva*	Sabalenka*	Sabalenka*	(Italy) Paolini *	(Canada) Mboko*	(Poland) Świątek*	(United States) Gauff*	(United States) Anisimova*	(Kazakhstan) Rybakina*	not held
2026	(Kazakhstan) Rybakina*	Andreeva*	(Czech Republic) Nosková*	(Kazakhstan) Rybakina*	(Czech Republic) Muchová*	(United States) Pegula*	Sabalenka*	Sabalenka*	(Ukraine) Kostyuk*	(Ukraine) Svitolina*	(Poland) Świątek*	(United States) Gauff*	(Poland) Chwalińska*	(China) Zheng*	Andreeva*	not held

== Title leaders ==
- The leaders in these tournaments since 1990 are (5+ total titles):
- Important note: by setting 1990 as the cut-off point, this list excludes many notable champions in high level tournaments from the previous years. High category tournaments equivalent to Tier 1/Premier/WTA 1000 existed before 1990, and the Grand Slam tournaments, Olympic Games and WTA Finals have been held since 1884, 1900 and 1972, respectively. See the all-time records article for records spanning the sport's history. Totals including titles won before 1990 are in brackets.

Active players and records since 1990 are denoted in bold.

Titles	Player	Majors	Tier I	Premier Mandatory/5	WTA 1000	WTA Finals	Olympic Games
**52**	(United States) Serena Williams	**23**	10	**13**	0	**5**	**1**
32	(Germany) Steffi Graf	14 (22)	15	—	—	3 (5)	0 (1)
24	(Switzerland) Martina Hingis	5	**17**	—	—	2	0
21	(Socialist Federal Republic of Yugoslavia) / (United States) Monica Seles	9	9	—	—	3	0
20	(Russia) Maria Sharapova	5	6	8	—	1	0
20	(Belgium) Justine Henin	7	10	0	—	2	**1**
19	(Poland) **Iga Świątek**	6	—	0	**12**	1	0
18	(United States) **Venus Williams**	7	6	3	0	1	**1**
16	(United States) Lindsay Davenport	3	11	—	—	1	**1**
15	(Belarus) **Aryna Sabalenka**	4	—	3	8	0	0
14	(Belgium) Kim Clijsters	4	5	2	0	3	0
12	(Belarus) **Victoria Azarenka**	2	0	10	0	0	0
12	(Czech Republic) Petra Kvitová	2	0	8	1	1	0
11	(Romania) Simona Halep	2	—	8	1	0	0
10	(Spain) Conchita Martínez	1	9	—	—	0	0
9	(France) Amélie Mauresmo	2	6	0	—	1	0
9	(Spain) Arantxa Sánchez Vicario	3 (4)	6	—	—	0	0
8	(Denmark) Caroline Wozniacki	1	0	6	0	1	0
7	(Argentina) Gabriela Sabatini	1	5	—	—	1	0
7	(France) Mary Pierce	2	5	0	—	0	0
7	(Australia) Ashleigh Barty	3	—	1	2	1	0
7	(United States) **Coco Gauff**	2	—	0	4	1	0
6	(United States) Jennifer Capriati	3	2	—	—	0	**1**
6	(Serbia) Jelena Janković	0	4	2	—	0	0
6	(Poland) Agnieszka Radwańska	0	0	5	—	1	0
6	(Spain) Garbiñe Muguruza	2	—	2	1	1	0
6	(Japan) **Naomi Osaka**	4	—	2	0	0	0
6	(Ukraine) **Elina Svitolina**	0	—	4	1	1	0
6	(Kazakhstan) **Elena Rybakina**	3	—	0	2	1	0
5	(Russia) Dinara Safina	0	3	2	—	0	0

== Calendar sweeps ==
- **Back-to-back** titles in a calendar year (three minimum).
- Currently active calendar combinations in **bold.**

Combination	Winner	Year
Rome—Berlin—French Open	(Socialist Federal Republic of Yugoslavia) Monica Seles	1990
Australian Open—Tokyo—Miami	(Germany) Steffi Graf	1994
Moscow—Zurich—Year-end Championship	(Switzerland) Martina Hingis	2000
Australian Open—Doha—Indian Wells	(Belarus) Victoria Azarenka	2012
**Miami—Madrid—Rome—French Open**	(United States) Serena Williams	2013
Doha—Indian Wells—Miami	(Poland) Iga Świątek	2022
**Madrid—Rome—French Open**	(Poland) Iga Świątek	2024

== See also ==
- List of WTA Tour top-level tournament doubles champions
- List of Grand Slam women's singles champions
- WTA Tier I tournaments
- List of Olympic medalists in tennis
- List of ATP Tour top-level tournament singles champions
- List of ATP Tour top-level tournament doubles champions
