= 1996 Toray Pan Pacific Open =

- Date: January 29 – February 4
- Edition: 24th
- Category: Tier I
- Draw: 28S / 16D
- Prize money: $926,250
- Surface: Carpet / indoor
- Location: Tokyo, Japan
- Venue: Tokyo Metropolitan Gymnasium

Champions

Singles
- (Croatia) Iva Majoli

Doubles
- (United States) Gigi Fernández / (Belarus) Natasha Zvereva
← 1995 ·	Pan Pacific Open	· 1997 →

The 1996 Toray Pan Pacific Open was a women's tennis tournament played on indoor carpet courts at the Tokyo Metropolitan Gymnasium in Tokyo in Japan that was part of the Tier I category of the 1996 WTA Tour. It was the 24th edition of the tournament and was held from January 29 through February 4, 1996. Eighth-seeded Iva Majoli won the singles title.

== Finals ==
=== Singles ===
(Croatia) Iva Majoli defeated (Spain) Arantxa Sánchez Vicario 6–4, 6–1

- It was Majoli's 1st singles title of the year and the 3rd of her career.

=== Doubles ===
(United States) Gigi Fernández / (Belarus) Natasha Zvereva defeated (South Africa) Mariaan de Swardt / (Romania) Irina Spîrlea 7–6, 6–3

- It was Fernández's 1st doubles title of the year and the 63rd of her career. It was Zvereva's 1st doubles title of the year and the 58th of her career.
