= 1995 Toray Pan Pacific Open – Doubles =

Doubles
- 1995 Toray Pan Pacific Open
- 1994 Champions: (United States) Pam Shriver (Australia) Elizabeth Smylie

Final
- Champions: (United States) Gigi Fernández (Belarus) Natasha Zvereva
- Runners-up: (United States) Lindsay Davenport (Australia) Rennae Stubbs
- Score: 6–0, 6–3

Events
Singles	Doubles
← 1994 ·	Toray Pan Pacific Open	· 1996 →

Pam Shriver and Elizabeth Smylie were the defending champions but only Shriver competed that year with Lori McNeil.

McNeil and Shriver lost in the first round to Kristie Boogert and Valda Lake.

Gigi Fernández and Natasha Zvereva won in the final 6–0, 6–3 against Lindsay Davenport and Rennae Stubbs.

== Seeds ==
Champion seeds are indicated in bold text while text in italics indicates the round in which those seeds were eliminated.

1. (United States) **Gigi Fernández** / (Belarus) **Natasha Zvereva (champions)**
2. (United States) Lindsay Davenport / (Australia) Rennae Stubbs (final)
3. (United States) Lori McNeil / (United States) Pam Shriver (first round)
4. (United States) Patty Fendick / (France) Mary Pierce (first round)

== Draw ==
=== Key ===
- Q = Qualifier
- WC = Wild card
- LL = Lucky loser
- Alt = Alternate
- SE = Special exempt
- PR = Protected ranking
- ITF = ITF entry
- JE = Junior exempt
- w/o = Walkover
- r = Retired
- d = Defaulted
- SR = Special ranking

First round
1	(United States) **G Fernández** (Belarus) **N Zvereva**	**6**	**6**
WC	(Japan) M Endo (Japan) N Sawamatsu	0	0
(United States) **K Adams** (United States) **Z Garrison-Jackson**	**6**	**6**
(Japan) K Nagatsuka (Japan) A Sugiyama	0	4
3	(United States) L McNeil (United States) P Shriver	**6**	6	6
(Netherlands) **K Boogert** (United Kingdom) **V Lake**	3	**7**	**7**
(Australia) K-A Guse (Germany) C Schneider	2	3
Q	(Japan) **Y Kamio** (Japan) **N Kijimuta**	**6**	**6**
(United States) D Graham (United States) S Stafford	3	1
(Indonesia) **Y Basuki** (Japan) **N Miyagi**	**6**	**6**
(Netherlands) **M Bollegraf** (Spain) **C Martínez**	**6**	2	**6**
4	(United States) P Fendick (France) M Pierce	2	**6**	3
(Croatia) **I Majoli** (Latvia) **L Neiland**	**7**	**6**
(Liechtenstein) P Buehler (Australia) J Byrne	5	2
(Sweden) M Lindström (Sweden) M Strandlund	3	4
2	(United States) **L Davenport** (Australia) **R Stubbs**	**6**	**6**

Quarterfinals
1	(United States) **G Fernández** (Belarus) **N Zvereva**	**6**	**6**
(United States) K Adams (United States) Z Garrison-Jackson	2	1
(Netherlands) K Boogert (United Kingdom) V Lake	2	**6**	2
Q	(Japan) **Y Kamio** (Japan) **N Kijimuta**	**6**	4	**6**
(Indonesia) Y Basuki (Japan) N Miyagi	2	1
(Netherlands) **M Bollegraf** (Spain) **C Martínez**	**6**	**6**
(Croatia) I Majoli (Latvia) L Neiland	3	0
2	(United States) **L Davenport** (Australia) **R Stubbs**	**6**	**6**

Semifinals
1	(United States) **G Fernández** (Belarus) **N Zvereva**	**6**	**6**
Q	(Japan) Y Kamio (Japan) N Kijimuta	4	0
(Netherlands) M Bollegraf (Spain) C Martínez	1	**6**	2
2	(United States) **L Davenport** (Australia) **R Stubbs**	**6**	1	**6**

Final
1	(United States) **Gigi Fernández** (Belarus) **Natasha Zvereva**	**6**	**6**
2	(United States) Lindsay Davenport (Australia) Rennae Stubbs	0	3
