= 1998 Toray Pan Pacific Open =

- Date: 3–8 February
- Edition: 26th
- Category: Tier I
- Draw: 28S / 16D
- Prize money: $926,250
- Surface: Carpet / indoor
- Location: Tokyo, Japan
- Venue: Tokyo Metropolitan Gymnasium

Champions

Singles
- (United States) Lindsay Davenport

Doubles
- (Switzerland) Martina Hingis / (Croatia) Mirjana Lučić
← 1997 ·	Pan Pacific Open	· 1999 →

The 1998 Toray Pan Pacific Open was a women's tennis tournament played onindoor carpet courts at the Tokyo Metropolitan Gymnasium in Tokyo, Japan that was part of Tier I of the 1998 WTA Tour. It was the 26th edition of the tournament and was held from 3 February 3 through 8 February 1998. Second-seeded Lindsay Davenport won the singles title and earned $150,000 first-prize money.

== Header ==
=== Singles ===
(United States) Lindsay Davenport defeated (Switzerland) Martina Hingis 6–3, 6–3

- It was Davenport's 1st title of the year and the 32nd of her career.

=== Doubles ===
(Switzerland) Martina Hingis / (Croatia) Mirjana Lučić defeated (United States) Lindsay Davenport / (Belarus) Natasha Zvereva 7–5, 6–4

- It was Hingis' 4th title of the year and the 30th of her career. It was Lučić's 2nd title of the year and the 3rd of her career.
