= 1996 Toray Pan Pacific Open – Doubles =

Doubles
- 1996 Toray Pan Pacific Open
- 1995 Champions: (United States) Gigi Fernández (Belarus) Natasha Zvereva

Final
- Champions: (United States) Gigi Fernández (Belarus) Natasha Zvereva
- Runners-up: (South Africa) Mariaan de Swardt (Romania) Irina Spîrlea
- Score: 7–6, 6–3

Details
- Draw: 16
- Seeds: 4

Events
Singles	Doubles
← 1995 ·	Toray Pan Pacific Open	· 1997 →

Gigi Fernández and Natasha Zvereva were the defending champions and won in the final 7–6, 6–3 against Mariaan de Swardt and Irina Spîrlea.

== Seeds ==
Champion seeds are indicated in bold text while text in italics indicates the round in which those seeds were eliminated.

1. (United States) **Gigi Fernández** / (Belarus) **Natasha Zvereva (champions)**
2. (United States) Nicole Arendt / (Netherlands) Manon Bollegraf (semifinals)
3. (Netherlands) Brenda Schultz-McCarthy / (Australia) Rennae Stubbs (quarterfinals)
4. (United States) Lindsay Davenport / (Spain) Conchita Martínez (first round)

== Draw ==
=== Key ===
- Q = Qualifier
- WC = Wild card
- LL = Lucky loser
- Alt = Alternate
- ITF = ITF entry
- PR = Protected ranking
- SR = Special ranking
- SE = Special exempt
- JE = Junior exempt
- JR = Junior Accelerator Programme entrant
- CO = College Accelerator Programme entrant
- NG = Next Gen Accelerator Program entrant
- w/o = Walkover
- r = Retired
- d = Defaulted

First round
1	(United States) **G Fernández** (Belarus) **N Zvereva**	4	**6**	**6**
(Australia) N Bradtke (Australia) E Smylie	**6**	2	4
(United States) **Z Garrison-Jackson** (United States) **K Rinaldi-Stunkel**	**6**	**6**
(Japan) R Hiraki (South Korea) S-H Park	2	3
3	(Netherlands) **B Schultz-McCarthy** (Australia) **R Stubbs**	**6**	**6**
(Australia) K-A Guse (Canada) P Hy-Boulais	3	4
(Sweden) M Lindström (Sweden) M Strandlund	4	3
(United States) **L Raymond** (Argentina) **G Sabatini**	**6**	**6**
Q	(Japan) N Kijimuta (Japan) A Sugiyama	3	3
(South Africa) **M de Swardt** (Romania) **I Spîrlea**	**6**	**6**
(Switzerland) **M Hingis** (Croatia) **I Majoli**	**6**	**6**
4	(United States) L Davenport (Spain) C Martínez	4	4
(Italy) **L Golarsa** (United States) **L McNeil**	**6**	6	**6**
(Canada) J Hetherington (Australia) K Radford	3	**7**	3
(Japan) M Saeki (Japan) Y Yoshida	4	0
2	(United States) **N Arendt** (Netherlands) **M Bollegraf**	**6**	**6**

Quarterfinals
1	(United States) **G Fernández** (Belarus) **N Zvereva**	**6**	**6**
(United States) Z Garrison-Jackson (United States) K Rinaldi-Stunkel	2	3
3	(Netherlands) B Schultz-McCarthy (Australia) R Stubbs	4	5
(United States) **L Raymond** (Argentina) **G Sabatini**	**6**	**7**
(South Africa) **M de Swardt** (Romania) **I Spîrlea**	**6**	3	**7**
(Switzerland) M Hingis (Croatia) I Majoli	3	**7**	3
(Italy) L Golarsa (United States) L McNeil	4	4
2	(United States) **N Arendt** (Netherlands) **M Bollegraf**	**6**	**6**

Semifinals
1	(United States) **G Fernández** (Belarus) **N Zvereva**	4	**6**	**7**
(United States) L Raymond (Argentina) G Sabatini	**6**	4	6
(South Africa) **M de Swardt** (Romania) **I Spîrlea**	**7**	5	**6**
2	(United States) N Arendt (Netherlands) M Bollegraf	6	**7**	2

Final
1	(United States) **Gigi Fernández** (Belarus) **Natasha Zvereva**	**7**	**6**
(South Africa) Mariaan de Swardt (Romania) Irina Spîrlea	6	3
