= 1995 Toray Pan Pacific Open =

- Date: January 31 – February 5
- Edition: 23rd
- Category: Tier I
- Draw: 28S / 16D
- Prize money: $806,250
- Surface: Carpet / indoor
- Location: Tokyo, Japan
- Venue: Tokyo Metropolitan Gymnasium

Champions

Singles
- (Japan) Kimiko Date

Doubles
- (United States) Gigi Fernández / (Belarus) Natasha Zvereva
← 1994 ·	Pan Pacific Open	· 1996 →

The 1995 Toray Pan Pacific Open was a women's tennis tournament played on indoor carpet courts at the Tokyo Metropolitan Gymnasium in Tokyo, Japan that was part of Tier I of the 1995 WTA Tour. The tournament was held from January 31 through February 5, 1995. Fifth-seeded Kimiko Date won the singles title and earned $148,500 first-prize money.

== Finals ==
=== Singles ===
(Japan) Kimiko Date defeated (United States) Lindsay Davenport 6–1, 6–2

- It was Date's only title of the year and the 5th of her career.

=== Doubles ===
(United States) Gigi Fernández / (Belarus) Natasha Zvereva defeated (United States) Lindsay Davenport / (Australia) Rennae Stubbs 6–0, 6–3

- It was Fernández's 1st title of the year and the 56th of her career. It was Zvereva's 1st title of the year and the 56th of her career.
