= 1997 Toray Pan Pacific Open =

- Date: 28 January – 2 February
- Edition: 25th
- Category: Tier I
- Draw: 28S / 16D
- Prize money: $926,250
- Surface: Carpet / indoor
- Location: Tokyo, Japan
- Venue: Tokyo Metropolitan Gymnasium

Champions

Singles
- (Switzerland) Martina Hingis

Doubles
- (United States) Lindsay Davenport / (Belarus) Natasha Zvereva
← 1996 ·	Pan Pacific Open	· 1998 →

The 1997 Toray Pan Pacific Open was a women's tennis tournament played on indoor carpet court at the Tokyo Metropolitan Gymnasium in Tokyo in Japan that was part of the Tier I category of the 1997 WTA Tour. It was the 25th edition of the tournament and was held from 28 January through 2 February 1997. Second-seeded Martina Hingis won the singles title. She won by walkover as her opponent, Steffi Graf, withdrew before the final match citing a knee injury.

== Finals ==
=== Singles ===
(Switzerland) Martina Hingis defeated (Germany) Steffi Graf by walkover

- It was Hingis' 3rd singles title of the year and the 5th of her career.

=== Doubles ===
(United States) Lindsay Davenport / (Belarus) Natasha Zvereva defeated (United States) Gigi Fernández / (Switzerland) Martina Hingis 6–4, 6–3

- It was Davenport's 1st title of the year and the 19th of her career. It was Zvereva's 2nd title of the year and the 64th of her career.
