= 1998 Toray Pan Pacific Open – Doubles =

Doubles
- 1998 Toray Pan Pacific Open
- 1997 Champions: (United States) Lindsay Davenport (Belarus) Natasha Zvereva

Final
- Champions: (Switzerland) Martina Hingis (Croatia) Mirjana Lučić
- Runners-up: (United States) Lindsay Davenport (Belarus) Natasha Zvereva
- Score: 7–5, 6–4

Details
- Draw: 16
- Seeds: 4

Events
Singles	Doubles
← 1997 ·	Toray Pan Pacific Open	· 1999 →

Lindsay Davenport and Natasha Zvereva were the defending champions, but lost in the final 7–5, 6–4 against Martina Hingis and Mirjana Lučić.

== Seeds ==
Champion seeds are indicated in bold text while text in italics indicates the round in which those seeds were eliminated.

1. (United States) Lindsay Davenport / (Belarus) Natasha Zvereva (final)
2. (Argentina) Patricia Tarabini / (Netherlands) Caroline Vis (first round)
3. (Japan) Naoko Kijimuta / (Japan) Nana Miyagi (first round)
4. (Russia) Elena Likhovtseva / (Japan) Ai Sugiyama (semifinals)

== Draw ==
=== Key ===
- Q = Qualifier
- WC = Wild card
- LL = Lucky loser
- Alt = Alternate
- ITF = ITF entry
- PR = Protected ranking
- SR = Special ranking
- SE = Special exempt
- JE = Junior exempt
- JR = Junior Accelerator Programme entrant
- CO = College Accelerator Programme entrant
- NG = Next Gen Accelerator Program entrant
- w/o = Walkover
- r = Retired
- d = Defaulted

First round
1	(United States) **L Davenport** (Belarus) **N Zvereva**	**6**	**6**
(Japan) S Obata (Japan) K Shibata	3	1
(Poland) M Grzybowska (Spain) A Ortuño	2	1
(Italy) **R Grande** (Romania) **I Spîrlea**	**6**	**6**
3	(Japan) N Kijimuta (Japan) N Miyagi	4	**7**	2
(Japan) **M Saeki** (Japan) **Y Yoshida**	**6**	6	**6**
(Japan) S Asagoe (South Korea) E-H Kim	5	4
(South Africa) **A Coetzer** (Germany) **A Huber**	**7**	**6**
(South Korea) **S-H Park** (Chinese Taipei) **S-T Wang**	**6**	4	**7**
(Romania) R Dragomir (Croatia) I Majoli	4	**6**	6
(Australia) K-A Guse (Japan) R Hiraki	2	6
4	(Russia) **E Likhovtseva** (Japan) **A Sugiyama**	**6**	**7**
Q	(Switzerland) **M Hingis** (Croatia) **M Lučić**	**6**	**6**
(Chinese Taipei) J Lee (Thailand) T Tanasugarn	4	4
(Netherlands) **K Boogert** (South Korea) **Y-J Cho**	2	**6**	**6**
2	(Argentina) P Tarabini (Netherlands) C Vis	**6**	3	4

Quarterfinals
1	(United States) **L Davenport** (Belarus) **N Zvereva**	**6**	**6**
(Italy) R Grande (Romania) I Spîrlea	2	2
(Japan) M Saeki (Japan) Y Yoshida	5	3
(South Africa) **A Coetzer** (Germany) **A Huber**	**7**	**6**
(South Korea) S-H Park (Chinese Taipei) S-T Wang	2	**6**	6
4	(Russia) **E Likhovtseva** (Japan) **A Sugiyama**	**6**	4	**7**
Q	(Switzerland) **M Hingis** (Croatia) **M Lučić**	**6**	**6**
(Netherlands) K Boogert (South Korea) Y-J Cho	3	1

Semifinals
1	(United States) **L Davenport** (Belarus) **N Zvereva**	**6**	**6**
(South Africa) A Coetzer (Germany) A Huber	4	3
4	(Russia) E Likhovtseva (Japan) A Sugiyama	3	4
Q	(Switzerland) **M Hingis** (Croatia) **M Lučić**	**6**	**6**

Final
1	(United States) Lindsay Davenport (Belarus) Natasha Zvereva	5	4
Q	(Switzerland) **Martina Hingis** (Croatia) **Mirjana Lučić**	**7**	**6**
