= Naoko Sawamatsu =

Japanese tennis player (born 1973)

Naoko Sawamatsu 沢松奈生子
- Country (sports): Japan
- Residence: Nishinomiya, Japan
- Born: 23 March 1973 (age 52); Nishinomiya, Japan
- Plays: Right-handed
- Prize money: $1,107,264

Singles
- Career record: 205–43
- Career titles: 4 WTA, 2 ITF
- Highest ranking: No. 14 (6 February 1995)

Grand Slam singles results
- Australian Open: QF (1995)
- French Open: 4R (1991)
- Wimbledon: 4R (1992, 1994)
- US Open: 3R (1992, 1995)

Other tournaments
- Olympic Games: 2R (1996)

Doubles
- Career record: 16–34
- Career titles: 0
- Highest ranking: No. 98 (30 January 1995)

Grand Slam doubles results
- Australian Open: 3R (1995)
- French Open: 1R (1992)
- Wimbledon: 2R (1992)
- US Open: 1R (1992)

Naoko Sawamatsu (沢松奈生子, Sawamatsu Naoko; born on 23 March 1973) is a former professional tennis player.

In her career, she won four singles titles on the WTA Tour. Sawamatsu reached a career-high ranking of world No. 14, on 6 February 1995. At the time of the 1995 Australian Open, her family survived the Great Hanshin earthquake, and Sawamatsu went on to achieve her best Grand Slam result at Melbourne Park, reaching the quarterfinals by defeating compatriot Ai Sugiyama, Laurence Courtois, Kimiko Date in the third round, Mary Joe Fernandez in the fourth round before losing to Arantxa Sánchez Vicario.

Her most significant title came in 1993 at Strasbourg, when she defeated clay-courter Judith Wiesner in the final. Sawamatsu had much success at Strasbourg reaching the semifinals in 1991, final in 1992 losing to Judith Wiesner.

She retired from professional tennis after losing in the second round of the 1998 Japan Open to Monica Seles in a three-set match. Sawamatsu had wins over the following players during her career: Martina Hingis, Lindsay Davenport, Kimiko Date, Mary Joe Fernandez, Amanda Coetzer, and Conchita Martínez. She was the first player to be beaten by Venus Williams in the main draw of a Grand Slam tournament, at the French Open in 1997.

Sawamatsu's has a career win–loss record in singles of 205–143.

Since retirement, she has been involved in the development of sport in her native country. Sawamatsu is the daughter of tennis player Junko Sawamatsu and the niece of 1975 Wimbledon ladies doubles champion Kazuko Sawamatsu.

Sawamatsu appeared in the 2018 TBS medical drama Black Pean as Yoshie Koyama, the wife of a patient.

== WTA career finals ==
=== Singles: 7 (4 titles, 3 runner-ups) ===
Legend
Tier I	0
Tier II	0
Tier III	2
Tier IV & V	2

Result	W/L	Date	Tournament	Tier	Surface	Opponent	Score
Win	1–0	Apr 1990	Singapore	Tier IV	Hard	(United Kingdom) Sarah Loosemore	7–6^{(7–5)}, 3–6, 6–4
Loss	1–1	Apr 1991	Pattaya, Thailand	Tier IV	Hard	(Indonesia) Yayuk Basuki	2–6, 2–6
Loss	1–2	May 1992	Strasbourg, France	Tier III	Clay	(Austria) Judith Wiesner	1–6, 3–6
Loss	1–3	Jan 1993	Melbourne, Australia	Tier IV	Hard	(South Africa) Amanda Coetzer	2–6, 3–6
Win	2–3	May 1993	Strasbourg, France	Tier III	Clay	(Austria) Judith Wiesner	4–6, 6–1, 6–3
Win	3–3	Apr 1994	Singapore	Tier IV	Hard	(Argentina) Florencia Labat	7–5, 7–5
Win	4–3	Apr 1997	Jakarta, Indonesia	Tier IV	Hard	(Japan) Yuka Yoshida	6–3, 6–2

== ITF Circuit finals ==
$50,000 tournaments
$25,000 tournaments
$10,000 tournaments

=== Singles: 2 (2–0) ===
Result	No.	Date	Tournament	Surface	Opponent	Score
Win	1.	15 October 1989	ITF Nagasaki, Japan	Hard	(United States) Akiko Gooden	6–4, 6–0
Win	2.	25 March 1990	ITF Moulins, France	Carpet (i)	(Brazil) Claudia Chabalgoity	6–3, 6-1

=== Doubles: 1 (0–1) ===
Result	No.	Date	Tournament	Surface	Partner	Opponents	Score
Loss	1.	7 November 1993	ITF Saga, Japan	Grass	(Japan) Mana Endo	(Japan) Ei Iida (Japan) Maya Kidowaki	2–6, 6–3, 2-6

== Performance timeline ==
Key
W	F	SF	QF	#R	RR	Q#	DNQ	A	NH

(W) winner; (F) finalist; (SF) semifinalist; (QF) quarterfinalist; (#R) rounds 4, 3, 2, 1; (RR) round-robin stage; (Q#) qualification round; (DNQ) did not qualify; (A) absent; (NH) not held; (SR) strike rate (events won / competed); (W–L) win–loss record.

Tournament	1990	1991	1992	1993	1994	1995	1996	1997	1998	W–L
Australian Open	A	3R	A	3R	2R	QF	4R	1R	1R	12–7
French Open	2R	4R	1R	2R	2R	3R	2R	1R	2R	10–9
Wimbledon	1R	2R	4R	3R	4R	3R	3R	2R	3R	16–9
US Open	2R	2R	3R	1R	1R	3R	2R	2R	2R	9–9
Win–loss	2–3	7–4	5–3	5–4	5–4	10–4	7–4	2–4	4–4	47–34
WTA Tier I tournaments										SR
Rome	-	-	-	3R	QF	2R	-	1R	2R	0 / 5
Berlin	-	2R	2R	-	-	2R	3R	-	1R	0 / 5
Charleston	-	-	-	-	-	-	-	-	2R	0 / 1
Philadelphia	Not Tier I			-	-	-	Not Tier I			0 / 0
Boca Raton	-	-	3R	Not Tier I			Not held			0 / 1
Tokyo	Not Tier I			-	-	QF	QF	2R	2R	0 / 4
Moscow	Not Tier I or Was Not Held							-	-	0 / 0
Miami	-	3R	3R	2R	4R	4R	2R	2R	3R	0 / 8
Montreal/Toronto	QF	3R	3R	3R	3R	-	-	3R	1R	0 / 7
Zurich	Not Tier I		-	-	-	1R	1R	1R	-	0 / 3
Indian Wells	-	-	-	-	-	SF	2R	2R	2R	0 / 4
Chicago	-	-	-	-	-	-	-	-	NH	0 / 0
Career statistics
Tournaments won	1	0	0	1	1	0	0	1	0	
Year-end ranking	31	33	24	28	26	17	38	34	55	
