= 1997 Toray Pan Pacific Open – Doubles =

Doubles
- 1997 Toray Pan Pacific Open
- 1996 Champions: (United States) Gigi Fernández (Belarus) Natasha Zvereva

Final
- Champions: (United States) Lindsay Davenport (Belarus) Natasha Zvereva
- Runners-up: (United States) Gigi Fernández (Switzerland) Martina Hingis
- Score: 6–4, 6–3

Details
- Draw: 16
- Seeds: 4

Events
Singles	Doubles
← 1996 ·	Toray Pan Pacific Open	· 1998 →

Gigi Fernández and Natasha Zvereva were the defending champions but they competed with different partners that year, Fernández with Martina Hingis and Zvereva with Lindsay Davenport.

Fernández and Hingis lost in the final 6–4, 6–3 against Davenport and Zvereva.

== Seeds ==
Champion seeds are indicated in bold text while text in italics indicates the round in which those seeds were eliminated.

1. (United States) Gigi Fernández / (Switzerland) Martina Hingis (final)
2. (United States) **Lindsay Davenport** / (Belarus) **Natasha Zvereva (champions)**
3. n/a
4. (United States) Lisa Raymond / (Australia) Rennae Stubbs (quarterfinals)

== Draw ==
=== Key ===
- Q = Qualifier
- WC = Wild card
- LL = Lucky loser
- Alt = Alternate
- ITF = ITF entry
- PR = Protected ranking
- SR = Special ranking
- SE = Special exempt
- JE = Junior exempt
- JR = Junior Accelerator Programme entrant
- CO = College Accelerator Programme entrant
- NG = Next Gen Accelerator Program entrant
- w/o = Walkover
- r = Retired
- d = Defaulted

First round
1	(United States) **G Fernández** (Switzerland) **M Hingis**	**6**	**6**
(Australia) K-A Guse (United States) A Lettiere	3	2
Q	(Germany) **S Graf** (United States) **P Shriver**	**7**	4	**6**
(United States) D Graham (Australia) K Radford	6	**6**	4
4	(United States) **L Raymond** (Australia) **R Stubbs**	3	**6**	**7**
(United States) G Helgeson-Nielsen (Netherlands) B Schultz-McCarthy	**6**	3	5
(Netherlands) **K Boogert** (Romania) **I Spîrlea**	**7**	**6**
(Indonesia) Y Basuki (Netherlands) C Vis	6	4
(United States) **K Adams** (United States) **L McNeil**	**6**	**6**
(France) A Dechaume-Balleret (Japan) N Miyagi	3	2
(Spain) **C Martínez** (Argentina) **P Tarabini**	**6**	**6**
LL	(Japan) K Nagatsuka (Japan) Y Yoshida	1	1
(Japan) **R Hiraki** (United States) **K Po**	**6**	**7**
(Romania) R Dragomir (Russia) E Likhovtseva	4	5
WC	(Japan) N Kijimuta (Japan) A Sugiyama	3	4
2	(United States) **L Davenport** (Belarus) **N Zvereva**	**6**	**6**

Quarterfinals
1	(United States) **G Fernández** (Switzerland) **M Hingis**	**7**	**6**
Q	(Germany) S Graf (United States) P Shriver	6	2
4	(United States) L Raymond (Australia) R Stubbs	2	2
(Netherlands) **K Boogert** (Romania) **I Spîrlea**	**6**	**6**
(United States) K Adams (United States) L McNeil	6	**7**	4
(Spain) **C Martínez** (Argentina) **P Tarabini**	**7**	6	**6**
(Japan) R Hiraki (United States) K Po	6	5
2	(United States) **L Davenport** (Belarus) **N Zvereva**	**7**	**7**

Semifinals
1	(United States) **G Fernández** (Switzerland) **M Hingis**	**6**	**6**
(Netherlands) K Boogert (Romania) I Spîrlea	1	1
(Spain) C Martínez (Argentina) P Tarabini	2	3
2	(United States) **L Davenport** (Belarus) **N Zvereva**	**6**	**6**

Final
1	(United States) Gigi Fernández (Switzerland) Martina Hingis	4	3
2	(United States) **Lindsay Davenport** (Belarus) **Natasha Zvereva**	**6**	**6**
