= 1995 Toray Pan Pacific Open – Singles =

Singles
- 1995 Toray Pan Pacific Open

Final
- Champion: (Japan) Kimiko Date
- Runner-up: (United States) Lindsay Davenport
- Score: 6–1, 6–2

Details
- Draw: 28 (3 Q / 2 WC )
- Seeds: 8

Events
Singles	Doubles
← 1994 ·	Pan Pacific Open	· 1996 →

Kimiko Date became the first Japanese player in 21 years to win the tournament after Kazuko Sawamatsu did it in 1974. Date defeated Lindsay Davenport in the final in straight sets.

Steffi Graf was the reigning champion, but did not compete that year.

== Seeds ==
A champion seed is indicated in bold text while text in italics indicates the round in which that seed was eliminated. The top four seeds received a bye to the second round.

1. (Spain) Conchita Martínez (quarterfinals)
2. (France) Mary Pierce (quarterfinals)
3. (United States) Lindsay Davenport (final)
4. (Belarus) Natasha Zvereva (second round)
5. (Japan) **Kimiko Date (champion)**
6. (Germany) Anke Huber (quarterfinals)
7. (Bulgaria) Magdalena Maleeva (semifinals)
8. (Croatia) Iva Majoli (semifinals)

== Draw ==
=== Key ===
- Q = Qualifier
- WC = Wild card
- LL = Lucky loser
- Alt = Alternate
- SE = Special exempt
- PR = Protected ranking
- ITF = ITF entry
- JE = Junior exempt
- w/o = Walkover
- r = Retired
- d = Defaulted
- SR = Special ranking

=== Final ===
Final
5	(Japan) **Kimiko Date**	**6**	**6**
3	(United States) Lindsay Davenport	1	2

=== Section 1 ===
First round
(United States) S Stafford	1	1
(Indonesia) **Y Basuki**	**6**	**6**
Q	(Japan) **Y Kamio**	**6**	**6**
(Chinese Taipei) S-T Wang	2	2
(United States) P Fendick	**6**	3	1
5	(Japan) **K Date**	4	**6**	**6**
(Japan) **N Sawamatsu**	**6**	**6**
(United States) Z Garrison-Jackson	1	2
(Netherlands) **K Boogert**	**6**	**6**
(Latvia) L Neiland	4	4
(United States) P Shriver	4	0
8	(Croatia) **I Majoli**	**6**	**6**

Second round
1	(Spain) **C Martínez**	**6**	5	**6**
(Indonesia) Y Basuki	2	**7**	2
Q	(Japan) Y Kamio	1	**6**	2
5	(Japan) **K Date**	**6**	2	**6**
4	(Belarus) N Zvereva	**6**	3	3
(Japan) **N Sawamatsu**	1	**6**	**6**
(Netherlands) K Boogert	**6**	6	4
8	(Croatia) **I Majoli**	3	**7**	**6**

Quarterfinals
1	(Spain) C Martínez	**6**	2	3
5	(Japan) **K Date**	0	**6**	**6**
(Japan) N Sawamatsu	**6**	3	0
8	(Croatia) **I Majoli**	4	**6**	**6**

Semifinals
5	(Japan) **K Date**	**6**	**6**
8	(Croatia) I Majoli	1	4

=== Section 2 ===
First round
6	(Germany) **A Huber**	3	**6**	**6**
(United States) G Fernández	**6**	1	2
(United States) **L McNeil**	**7**	**6**
(Germany) B Rittner	5	3
(Japan) **M Endo**	**7**	**7**
Q	(Japan) R Hiraki	5	5
7	(Bulgaria) **M Maleeva**	**6**	**6**
Q	(Japan) A Sugiyama	1	2
WC	(Japan) N Miyagi	4	2
(Israel) **A Smashnova**	**6**	**6**
Q	(United States) D Graham	**6**	4	2
WC	(Japan) **K Nagatsuka**	1	**6**	**6**

Second round
6	(Germany) **A Huber**	**6**	2	**7**
(United States) L McNeil	4	**6**	5
(Japan) M Endo	2	1
3	(United States) **L Davenport**	**6**	**6**
7	(Bulgaria) **M Maleeva**	**w/o**
(Israel) A Smashnova
WC	(Japan) K Nagatsuka	4	0
2	(France) **M Pierce**	**6**	**6**

Quarterfinals
6	(Germany) A Huber	**6**	4	2
3	(United States) **L Davenport**	2	**6**	**6**
7	(Bulgaria) **M Maleeva**	**6**	1	**6**
2	(France) M Pierce	3	**6**	3

Semifinals
3	(United States) **L Davenport**	**6**	**6**
7	(Bulgaria) M Maleeva	3	2
