= 1997 Toray Pan Pacific Open – Singles =

Singles
- 1997 Toray Pan Pacific Open
- 1996 Champion: (Croatia) Iva Majoli

Final
- Champion: (Switzerland) Martina Hingis
- Runner-up: (Germany) Steffi Graf
- Score: Walkover

Details
- Draw: 28 (4 Q / 2 WC )
- Seeds: 8

Events
Singles	Doubles
← 1996 ·	Pan Pacific Open	· 1998 →

Martina Hingis won the singles tennis title at the 1997 Pan Pacific Open via walkover after Steffi Graf withdrew from the final.

Iva Majoli was the defending champion, but lost in the quarterfinals to Graf.

== Seeds ==
A champion seed is indicated in bold text while text in italics indicates the round in which that seed was eliminated. The top four seeds received a bye to the second round.

1. (Germany) Steffi Graf (final)
2. (Switzerland) **Martina Hingis (champion)**
3. (Spain) Conchita Martínez (quarterfinals)
4. (Germany) Anke Huber (semifinals)
5. (Croatia) Iva Majoli (quarterfinals)
6. (United States) Lindsay Davenport (quarterfinals)
7. (Romania) Irina Spîrlea (second round)
8. (Netherlands) Brenda Schultz-McCarthy (semifinals)

== Draw ==
=== Key ===
- Q = Qualifier
- WC = Wild card
- LL = Lucky loser
- Alt = Alternate
- ITF = ITF entry
- PR = Protected ranking
- SR = Special ranking
- SE = Special exempt
- JE = Junior exempt
- JR = Junior Accelerator Programme entrant
- CO = College Accelerator Programme entrant
- NG = Next Gen Accelerator Program entrant
- w/o = Walkover
- r = Retired
- d = Defaulted

=== Final ===
Final
1	(Germany) Steffi Graf
2	(Switzerland) **Martina Hingis**	**w/o**

=== Section 1 ===
First round
Q	(Netherlands) S Noorlander	5	**7**	5
(United States) **L Raymond**	**7**	6	**7**
(Japan) **A Sugiyama**	**7**	6	**6**
Q	(France) A Dechaume-Balleret	6	**7**	4
Q	(Czech Republic) L Varmužová	4	5
5	(Croatia) **I Majoli**	**6**	**7**
(Japan) N Kijimuta	2	**6**	4
Q	(Netherlands) **K Boogert**	**6**	4	**6**
(Slovakia) H Nagyová	**6**	3	3
(Japan) **N Sawamatsu**	4	**6**	**6**
(Romania) R Dragomir	**7**	4	2
8	(Netherlands) **B Schultz-McCarthy**	5	**6**	**6**

Second round
1	(Germany) **S Graf**	**6**	**6**
(United States) L Raymond	3	2
(Japan) A Sugiyama	5	5
5	(Croatia) **I Majoli**	**7**	**7**
3	(Spain) **C Martínez**	**7**	1	**6**
Q	(Netherlands) K Boogert	6	**6**	3
(Japan) N Sawamatsu	6	5
8	(Netherlands) **B Schultz-McCarthy**	**7**	**7**

Quarterfinals
1	(Germany) **S Graf**	**6**	**6**
5	(Croatia) I Majoli	2	3
3	(Spain) C Martínez	1	0
8	(Netherlands) **B Schultz-McCarthy**	**6**	**6**

Semifinals
1	(Germany) **S Graf**	**6**	**7**
8	(Netherlands) B Schultz-McCarthy	1	5

=== Section 2 ===
First round
6	(United States) **L Davenport**	**6**	**6**
(Chinese Taipei) S-T Wang	1	2
WC	(Thailand) **T Tanasugarn**	**6**	**6**
(Belarus) N Zvereva	2	1
(United States) **K Po**	**6**	**6**
(Slovakia) K Studeníková	4	1
7	(Romania) **I Spîrlea**	**6**	**6**
(Russia) E Likhovtseva	3	4
(Indonesia) Y Basuki	4	1
(South Africa) **A Coetzer**	**6**	**6**
(Italy) **G Pizzichini**	**7**	4	**7**
WC	(Japan) R Hiraki	6	**6**	6

Second round
6	(United States) **L Davenport**	**6**	**6**
WC	(Thailand) T Tanasugarn	3	1
(United States) K Po	4	3
4	(Germany) **A Huber**	**6**	**6**
7	(Romania) I Spîrlea	4	**6**	4
(South Africa) **A Coetzer**	**6**	2	**6**
(Italy) G Pizzichini	1	0
2	(Switzerland) **M Hingis**	**6**	**6**

Quarterfinals
6	(United States) L Davenport	3	**6**	2
4	(Germany) **A Huber**	**6**	4	**6**
(South Africa) A Coetzer	0	1
2	(Switzerland) **M Hingis**	**6**	**6**

Semifinals
4	(Germany) A Huber	1	**7**	2
2	(Switzerland) **M Hingis**	**6**	5	**6**
