= 2001 WTA Tour Championships – Singles =

Singles
- 2001 WTA Tour Championships

Final
- Champion: (United States) Serena Williams
- Runner-up: (United States) Lindsay Davenport
- Score: walkover

Details
- Draw: 16
- Seeds: 8

Events
| Singles | Doubles |
- WTA Tour Championships

Serena Williams won the singles tennis title at the 2001 WTA Tour Championships by default, after Lindsay Davenport withdrew from the final. It was her first Tour Finals title in what was her tournament debut as well.

Martina Hingis was the defending champion, but withdrew due to ankle surgery.

This was the last professional tournament for former world No. 4 Anke Huber.

== Seeds ==
1. (United States) Jennifer Capriati (quarterfinals)
2. (United States) Lindsay Davenport (final, withdrew)
3. (Belgium) Kim Clijsters (semifinals)
4. (Belgium) Justine Henin (quarterfinals)
5. (France) Amélie Mauresmo (first round)
6. (Serbia and Montenegro) Jelena Dokić (quarterfinals)
7. (United States) Serena Williams (champion)
8. (France) Nathalie Tauziat (first round)

Notes

- (United States) Venus Williams ranked 3 had qualified but pulled out due to left wrist injury.
- (Switzerland) Martina Hingis ranked 4 had qualified but pulled out due to ankle surgery.
- (United States) Monica Seles ranked 9 had qualified but chose not to play, given the fact that the tournament took place in Germany, the same country as her stabbing.

== Draw ==
Key

- Q = Qualifier
- WC = Wild card
- LL = Lucky loser
- Alt = Alternate
- ITF = ITF entry
- PR = Protected ranking
- SR = Special ranking
- SE = Special exempt
- JE = Junior exempt
- JR = Junior Accelerator Programme entrant
- CO = College Accelerator Programme entrant
- NG = Next Gen Accelerator Program entrant
- w/o = Walkover
- r = Retired
- d = Defaulted

=== Finals ===
First round
1 | (United States) Jennifer Capriati | 2 | 6 | 6
(Bulgaria) Magdalena Maleeva | 6 | 3 | 3
(France) Sandrine Testud | 5 | 7 | 6
5 | (France) Amélie Mauresmo | 7 | 5 | 1
4 | (Belgium) Justine Henin | 6 | 6
(Germany) Anke Huber | 1 | 2
(Italy) Silvia Farina Elia | 0 | 2
7 | (United States) Serena Williams | 6 | 6
8 | (France) Nathalie Tauziat | 3 | 4
(Spain) Arantxa Sánchez Vicario | 6 | 6
(Russia) Elena Dementieva | 3 | 6^{2}
3 | (Belgium) Kim Clijsters | 6 | 7^{7}
6 | (Serbia and Montenegro) Jelena Dokić | 7^{7} | 6
(United States) Meghann Shaughnessy | 6^{4} | 2
(South Africa) Amanda Coetzer | 3 | 3
2 | (United States) Lindsay Davenport | 6 | 6

Quarterfinals
1 | (United States) Jennifer Capriati | 3 | 6 | 3
(France) Sandrine Testud | 6 | 4 | 6
4 | (Belgium) Justine Henin | 3 | 6^{5}
7 | (United States) Serena Williams | 6 | 7^{7}
(Spain) Arantxa Sánchez Vicario | 5 | 1
3 | (Belgium) Kim Clijsters | 7 | 6
6 | (Serbia and Montenegro) Jelena Dokić | 4 | 2
2 | (United States) Lindsay Davenport | 6 | 6

Semifinals
(France) Sandrine Testud | 3 | 0
7 | (United States) Serena Williams | 6 | 6
3 | (Belgium) Kim Clijsters | 6 | 3 | 6^{3}
2 | (United States) Lindsay Davenport | 1 | 6 | 7^{7}

Final
7 | (United States) Serena Williams | w/o
2 | (United States) Lindsay Davenport

== See also ==
- WTA Tour Championships appearances
