= 1999 WTA Tour Championships – Singles =

Singles
- 1999 WTA Tour Championships

Final
- Champion: (United States) Lindsay Davenport
- Runner-up: (Switzerland) Martina Hingis
- Score: 6–4, 6–2

Details
- Draw: 16
- Seeds: 8

Events
Singles	Doubles
← 1998 ·	WTA Tour Championships	· 2000 →

Lindsay Davenport defeated the defending champion Martina Hingis in a rematch of the previous year's final, 6–4, 6–2 to win the singles tennis title at the 1999 WTA Tour Championships.

== Seeds ==
1. (Switzerland) Martina Hingis (final)
2. (United States) Lindsay Davenport (champion)
3. (United States) Venus Williams (semifinals)
4. (United States) Serena Williams (withdrew, retired due to back injury during practice)
5. (France) Mary Pierce (quarterfinals)
6. (France) Nathalie Tauziat (semifinals)
7. (Austria) Barbara Schett (quarterfinals)
8. (France) Julie Halard-Decugis (first round)

Notes:

- (United States) Monica Seles had qualified but pulled out due to right foot stress fracture

== Alternates ==
1. (Russia) Elena Likhovtseva (replaced Serena Williams, defeated in first round)

== Draw ==
=== Key ===
- Q = Qualifier
- WC = Wild card
- LL = Lucky loser
- Alt = Alternate
- SE = Special exempt
- PR = Protected ranking
- ITF = ITF entry
- JE = Junior exempt
- w/o = Walkover
- r = Retired
- d = Defaulted
- SR = Special ranking

First round
1	(Switzerland) Martina Hingis	7^{7}	7^{7}
(France) Sandrine Testud	6^{5}	6^{5}
(Russia) Anna Kournikova	7^{7}	6^{5}	0
5	(France) Mary Pierce	6^{3}	7^{7}	6
3	(United States) Venus Williams	6	5	6
(Spain) Conchita Martínez	2	7	4
(Spain) Arantxa Sánchez Vicario	1	4
7	(Austria) Barbara Schett	6	6
6	(France) Nathalie Tauziat	6	7^{8}
(South Africa) Amanda Coetzer	3	6^{6}
(Belgium) Dominique Van Roost	6	6
Alt	(Russia) Elena Likhovtseva	2	3
8	(France) Julie Halard-Decugis	1	2
(Germany) Anke Huber	6	6
(France) Amélie Mauresmo	6	3	2
2	(United States) Lindsay Davenport	3	6	6

Quarterfinals
1	(Switzerland) Martina Hingis	6	6
5	(France) Mary Pierce	1	2
3	(United States) Venus Williams	6	7^{7}
7	(Austria) Barbara Schett	4	6^{4}
6	(France) Nathalie Tauziat	6	6
(Belgium) Dominique Van Roost	3	2
(Germany) Anke Huber	3	1
2	(United States) Lindsay Davenport	6	6

Semifinals
1	(Switzerland) Martina Hingis	6	7^{7}
3	(United States) Venus Williams	4	6^{2}
6	(France) Nathalie Tauziat	6^{3}	0
2	(United States) Lindsay Davenport	7^{7}	6

Final
1	(Switzerland) Martina Hingis	4	2
2	(United States) Lindsay Davenport	6	6

== See also ==
- WTA Tour Championships appearances
