= 1998 Toray Pan Pacific Open – Singles =

Singles
- 1998 Toray Pan Pacific Open

Final
- Champion: (United States) Lindsay Davenport
- Runner-up: (Switzerland) Martina Hingis
- Score: 6–3, 6–3

Details
- Draw: 28 (4 Q / 2 WC )
- Seeds: 8

Events
| Singles | Doubles |
| ← 1997 · | Pan Pacific Open | · 1999 → |

Lindsay Davenport defeated the defending champion Martina Hingis in the final, 6–3, 6–3 to win the singles tennis title at the 1998 Pan Pacific Open.

== Seeds ==
A champion seed is indicated in bold text while text in italics indicates the round in which that seed was eliminated. The top four seeds received a bye to the second round.

1. (Switzerland) Martina Hingis (final)
2. (United States) **Lindsay Davenport (champion)**
3. (South Africa) Amanda Coetzer (semifinals)
4. (Croatia) Iva Majoli (semifinals)
5. (Romania) Irina Spîrlea (quarterfinals)
6. (Germany) Anke Huber (first round)
7. (Netherlands) Brenda Schultz-McCarthy (withdrew)
8. (Japan) Ai Sugiyama (quarterfinals)
9. (Romania) Ruxandra Dragomir (first round)

== Draw ==
=== Key ===
- Q = Qualifier
- WC = Wild card
- LL = Lucky loser
- Alt = Alternate
- ITF = ITF entry
- PR = Protected ranking
- SR = Special ranking
- SE = Special exempt
- JE = Junior exempt
- JR = Junior Accelerator Programme entrant
- CO = College Accelerator Programme entrant
- NG = Next Gen Accelerator Program entrant
- w/o = Walkover
- r = Retired
- d = Defaulted

=== Final ===
| Final |
| 1 | (Switzerland) Martina Hingis | 3 | 3 |
| 2 | (United States) **Lindsay Davenport** | **6** | **6** |

=== Section 1 ===
First round
(Russia) **E Likhovtseva** | **6** | **6**
(Croatia) M Lučić | 1 | 2
Q | (Netherlands) K Boogert | **6** | 1 | 4
(Italy) **R Grande** | 3 | **6** | **6**
(Venezuela) **M Vento** | **6** | **6**
9 | (Romania) R Dragomir | 0 | 3
(Thailand) T Tanasugarn | 1 | 3
Q | (China) **F Li** | **6** | **6**
WC | (Japan) **M Saeki** | 3 | **6** | **6**
(Spain) M Serna | **6** | 3 | 3
(Bulgaria) **M Maleeva** | 3 | **7** | **6**
6 | (Germany) A Huber | **6** | 6 | 1

Second round
1 | (Switzerland) **M Hingis** | **6** | **6**
(Russia) E Likhovtseva | 1 | 0
(Italy) **R Grande** | 1 | **6** | **6**
(Venezuela) M Vento | **6** | 3 | 3
4 | (Croatia) **I Majoli** | **6** | **3**
Q | (China) F Li | 3 | 0 | r
WC | (Japan) **M Saeki** | **6** | **7**
(Bulgaria) M Maleeva | 4 | 6

Quarterfinals
1 | (Switzerland) **M Hingis** | **6** | **7**
(Italy) R Grande | 2 | 5
4 | (Croatia) **I Majoli** | **6** | **6**
WC | (Japan) M Saeki | 2 | 1

Semifinals
1 | (Switzerland) **M Hingis** | **6** | **6**
4 | (Croatia) I Majoli | 0 | 2

=== Section 2 ===
First round
8 | (Japan) **A Sugiyama** | **7** | **6**
(Australia) K-A Guse | 6 | 0
WC | (Japan) **Y Yoshida** | 4 | **7** | **6**
(Poland) M Grzybowska | **6** | 6 | 4
Q | (South Korea) Y-J Cho | 3 | 4
Q | (United States) **S Reeves** | **6** | **6**
5 | (Romania) **I Spîrlea** | **7** | **6**
LL | (South Korea) S-H Park | 5 | 0
(Belarus) N Zvereva | 4 | 6
(South Africa) **J Kruger** | **6** | **7**
(Spain) M Sánchez Lorenzo | 1 | 1
(Japan) **N Sawamatsu** | **6** | **6**

Second round
8 | (Japan) **A Sugiyama** | **6** | **7**
WC | (Japan) Y Yoshida | 1 | 6
Q | (United States) S Reeves | 4 | 4
3 | (South Africa) **A Coetzer** | **6** | **6**
5 | (Romania) **I Spîrlea** | **6** | **6**
(South Africa) J Kruger | 1 | 2
(Japan) N Sawamatsu | 2 | 2
2 | (United States) **L Davenport** | **6** | **6**

Quarterfinals
8 | (Japan) A Sugiyama | 3 | **6** | 2
3 | (South Africa) **A Coetzer** | **6** | 2 | **6**
5 | (Romania) I Spîrlea | 6 | 6
2 | (United States) **L Davenport** | **7** | **7**

Semifinals
3 | (South Africa) A Coetzer | 2 | 1
2 | (United States) **L Davenport** | **6** | **6**
