= 1998 Chase Championships – Singles =

Singles
- 1998 Chase Championships

Final
- Champion: (Switzerland) Martina Hingis
- Runner-up: (United States) Lindsay Davenport
- Score: 7–5, 6–4, 4–6, 6–2

Details
- Draw: 16
- Seeds: 8

Events
Singles	Doubles
← 1997 ·	Chase Championships	· 1999 →

Martina Hingis defeated Lindsay Davenport in the final, 7–5, 6–4, 4–6, 6–2 to win the singles tennis title at the 1998 Chase Championships.

Jana Novotná was the defending champion, but lost in the first round to Steffi Graf.

This marked the last WTA Championships final to be best-of-five-sets.

== Seeds ==
A champion seed is indicated in bold text while text in italics indicates the round in which that seed was eliminated.

1. (United States) Lindsay Davenport (final)
2. (Switzerland) **Martina Hingis (champion)**
3. (Czech Republic) Jana Novotná (first round)
4. (Spain) Arantxa Sánchez-Vicario (first round)
5. (United States) Monica Seles (quarterfinals)
6. (France) Mary Pierce (quarterfinals)
7. (Spain) Conchita Martínez (first round)
8. (France) Nathalie Tauziat (quarterfinals)

== Draw ==
=== Key ===
- Q = Qualifier
- WC = Wild card
- LL = Lucky loser
- Alt = Alternate
- SE = Special exempt
- PR = Protected ranking
- ITF = ITF entry
- JE = Junior exempt
- w/o = Walkover
- r = Retired
- d = Defaulted
- SR = Special ranking
- NB: The Final was best of 5 sets while all other rounds were best of 3 sets.

First round
1	(United States) **Lindsay Davenport**	4	**7**	**6**
(France) Sandrine Testud	**6**	6	0
(Belarus) Natasha Zvereva	3	1
8	(France) **Nathalie Tauziat**	**6**	**6**
3	(Czech Republic) Jana Novotná	**7**	4	1
(Germany) **Steffi Graf**	6	**6**	**6**
(Russia) Anna Kournikova	4	3
5	(United States) **Monica Seles**	**6**	**6**
7	(Spain) Conchita Martínez	6	2
(Belgium) **Dominique Van Roost**	**7**	**6**
(Romania) **Irina Spîrlea**	**7**	**6**
4	(Spain) Arantxa Sánchez-Vicario	6	1
6	(France) **Mary Pierce**	**6**	**6**
(South Africa) Amanda Coetzer	1	0
(Switzerland) Patty Schnyder	**6**	0	3
2	(Switzerland) **Martina Hingis**	4	**6**	**6**

Quarterfinals
1	(United States) **Lindsay Davenport**	**6**	**6**
8	(France) Nathalie Tauziat	0	3
(Germany) **Steffi Graf**	1	**6**	**6**
5	(United States) Monica Seles	**6**	4	4
(Belgium) Dominique Van Roost	2	3
(Romania) **Irina Spîrlea**	**6**	**6**
6	(France) Mary Pierce	6	4
2	(Switzerland) **Martina Hingis**	**7**	**6**

Semifinals
1	(United States) **Lindsay Davenport**	**6**	2	**6**
(Germany) Steffi Graf	1	**6**	3
(Romania) Irina Spîrlea	2	6
2	(Switzerland) **Martina Hingis**	**6**	**7**

Final
1	(United States) Lindsay Davenport	5	4	**6**	2
2	(Switzerland) **Martina Hingis**	**7**	**6**	4	**6**
