= 1996 Toray Pan Pacific Open – Singles =

Singles
- 1996 Toray Pan Pacific Open

Final
- Champion: (Croatia) Iva Majoli
- Runner-up: (Spain) Arantxa Sánchez Vicario
- Score: 6–4, 6–1

Details
- Draw: 28 (3 Q )
- Seeds: 8

Events
Singles	Doubles
- Pan Pacific Open

Iva Majoli defeated Arantxa Sánchez Vicario in the final, 6–4, 6–1 to win the singles tennis title at the 1996 Pan Pacific Open.

Kimiko Date was the defending champion, but lost in the second round to Naoko Sawamatsu.

== Seeds ==
A champion seed is indicated in bold text while text in italics indicates the round in which that seed was eliminated. The top four seeds received a bye to the second round.

1. (United States) Monica Seles (quarterfinals)
2. (Spain) Conchita Martínez (semifinals)
3. (Spain) Arantxa Sánchez Vicario (final)
4. (Japan) Kimiko Date (second round)
5. (Bulgaria) Magdalena Maleeva (quarterfinals)
6. (Argentina) Gabriela Sabatini (first round)
7. (Croatia) **Iva Majoli (champion)**
8. (United States) Lindsay Davenport (quarterfinals)

== Draw ==
Key

- Q = Qualifier
- WC = Wild card
- LL = Lucky loser
- Alt = Alternate
- ITF = ITF entry
- PR = Protected ranking
- SR = Special ranking
- SE = Special exempt
- JE = Junior exempt
- JR = Junior Accelerator Programme entrant
- CO = College Accelerator Programme entrant
- NG = Next Gen Accelerator Program entrant
- w/o = Walkover
- r = Retired
- d = Defaulted

=== Final ===
Final
7	(Croatia) **Iva Majoli**	**6**	**6**
3	(Spain) Arantxa Sánchez Vicario	4	1

=== Section 1 ===
First round
(United States) L McNeil	3	0
(Romania) **I Spîrlea**	**6**	**6**
Q	(Sweden) M Strandlund	6	4
(Netherlands) **B Schultz-McCarthy**	**7**	**6**
(United States) Z Garrison-Jackson	2	4
7	(Croatia) **I Majoli**	**6**	**6**
(South Africa) J Kruger	3	3
(Japan) **N Sawamatsu**	**6**	**6**
(Japan) **A Sugiyama**	**6**	**6**
(Japan) M Endo	2	4
(Switzerland) **M Hingis**	**6**	**6**
6	(Argentina) G Sabatini	3	4

Second round
1	(United States) **M Seles**	**6**	**6**
(Romania) I Spîrlea	4	2
(Netherlands) B Schultz-McCarthy	6	5
7	(Croatia) **I Majoli**	**7**	**7**
4	(Japan) K Date	5	**6**	4
(Japan) **N Sawamatsu**	**7**	3	**6**
(Japan) A Sugiyama	0	3
(Switzerland) **M Hingis**	**6**	**6**

Quarterfinals
1	(United States) M Seles	**6**	6	4
7	(Croatia) **I Majoli**	1	**7**	**6**
(Japan) N Sawamatsu	1	2
(Switzerland) **M Hingis**	**6**	**6**

Semifinals
7	(Croatia) **I Majoli**	3	**6**	**6**
(Switzerland) M Hingis	**6**	3	0

=== Section 2 ===
First round
5	(Bulgaria) **M Maleeva**	**6**	**6**
(South Africa) M de Swardt	3	2
Q	(Japan) R Hiraki	4	**6**	3
(United States) **G Fernández**	**6**	4	**6**
(Australia) **N Bradtke**	**6**	**6**
(Belarus) N Zvereva	2	3
8	(United States) **L Davenport**	6	**6**	**6**
Q	(Japan) N Kijimuta	**7**	4	2
Q	(Australia) R Stubbs	3	6
(United States) **L Raymond**	**6**	**7**
(Japan) Y Kamio	**6**	3	3
(Japan) **K Nagatsuka**	1	**6**	**6**

Second round
5	(Bulgaria) **M Maleeva**	4	**6**	**6**
(United States) G Fernández	**6**	2	4
(Australia) N Bradtke
3	(Spain) **A Sánchez Vicario**	**w/o**
8	(United States) **L Davenport**	**6**	**6**
(United States) L Raymond	1	3
(Japan) K Nagatsuka	2	3
2	(Spain) **C Martínez**	**6**	**6**

Quarterfinals
5	(Bulgaria) M Maleeva	5	3
3	(Spain) **A Sánchez Vicario**	**7**	**6**
8	(United States) L Davenport	2	3
2	(Spain) **C Martínez**	**6**	**6**

Semifinals
3	(Spain) **A Sánchez Vicario**	**6**	5	**6**
2	(Spain) C Martínez	4	**7**	4
