= 1996 WTA Tour =

Women's tennis circuit

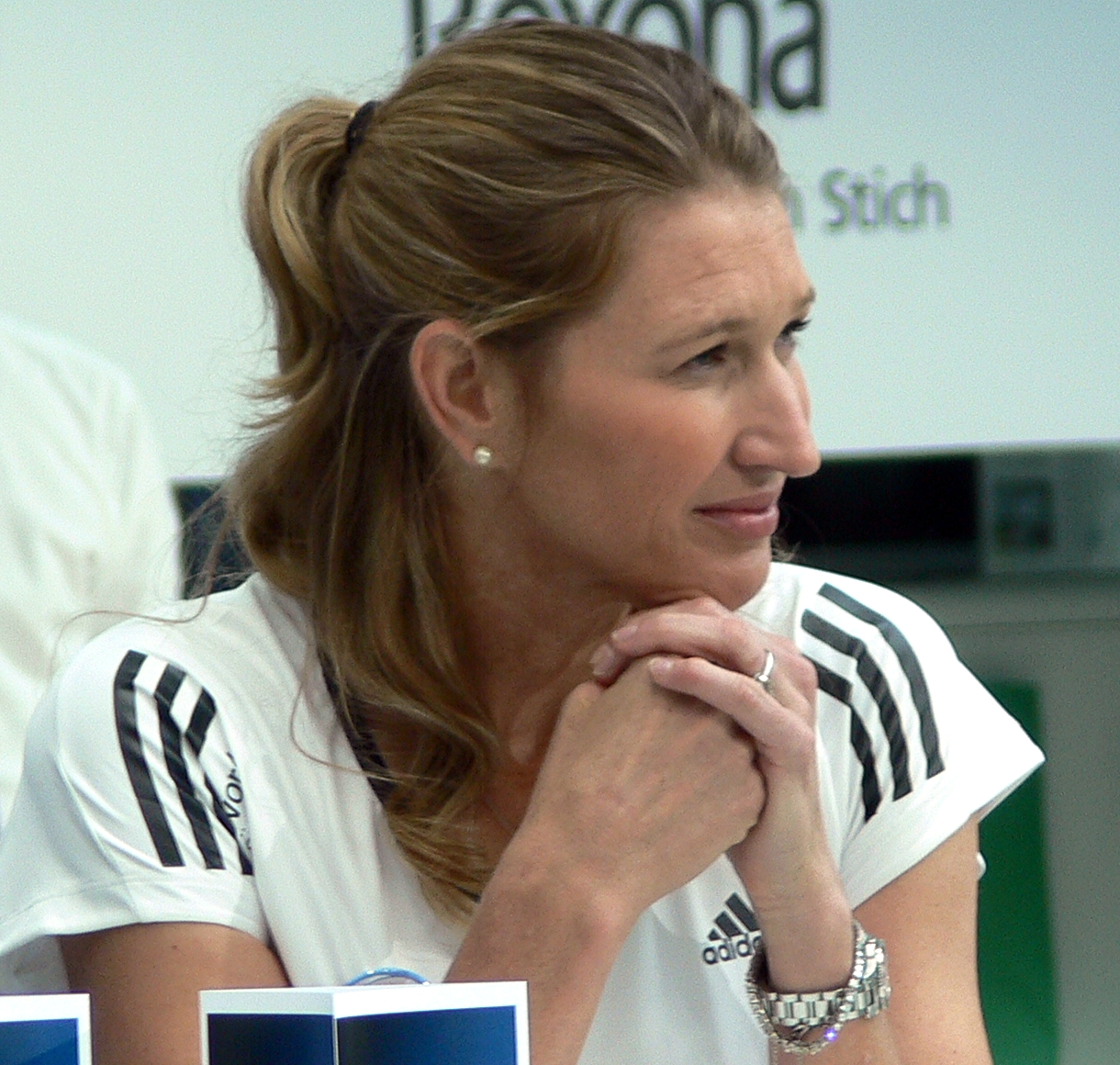
- Steffi Graf finished the year as world No. 1 for the record-breaking eighth time in her career. She won seven tournaments during the season, including three majors at the French Open, the Wimbledon Championships, and the US Open, as well as the WTA Tour Championships. She also won three Tier I events.

Details
- Duration: January 1 – November 25, 1996
- Edition: 26th
- Tournaments: 51
- Categories: Grand Slam (4); WTA Championships; Summer Olympics; WTA Tier I (8); WTA Tier II (15); WTA Tier III (11); WTA Tier IV (11)

Achievements (singles)
- Most titles: (West Germany) Steffi Graf (7)
- Most finals: (Spain) Arantxa Sánchez Vicario (9)
- Prize money leader: (West Germany) Steffi Graf (US$2,665,706)
- Points leader: (West Germany) Steffi Graf (4,649)

Awards
- Player of the year: (West Germany) Steffi Graf
- Doubles team of the year: (Czech Republic) Jana Novotná; (Spain) Arantxa Sánchez Vicario
- Most improved player of the year: (Switzerland) Martina Hingis
- Newcomer of the year: (Russia) Anna Kournikova
- Comeback player of the year: (United States) Jennifer Capriati

The WTA Tour is the elite tour for professional women's tennis circuit, organized by the Women's Tennis Association (WTA). The 1996 WTA Tour included the four Grand Slam tournaments, the WTA Tour Championships and the WTA Tier I, Tier II, Tier III and Tier IV events. ITF tournaments are not officially part of the WTA Tour, although they award points for the WTA World Ranking.

== Schedule ==
The table below shows the 1996 WTA Tour schedule.

Key

Grand Slam events
Summer Olympic Games
Year-end championships
Tier I events
Tier II events
Tier III events
Tier IV events
Team events

=== January ===
Week	Tournament	Champions	Runners-up	Semifinalists	Quarterfinalists
1 Jan	Hyundai Hopman Cup; Perth, Australia; ITF Mixed Teams Championships; Hard (i) – A$1,000,000 – 9 teams (RR)	Croatia; 2–1	Switzerland	Round robin (Group A) United States; South Africa; France	Round robin (Group B) Germany; Australia; Netherlands
1 Jan	Amway Classic; Auckland, New Zealand; Tier IV event Hard – $107,500 – 32S/16D; Singles – Doubles	(United States) Sandra Cacic; 6–3, 1–6, 6–4	(Austria) Barbara Paulus	(Argentina) Florencia Labat (China) Fang Li	(France) Julie Halard-Decugis (Germany) Sabine Hack (Italy) Rita Grande (Germany) Karin Kschwendt
1 Jan	Amway Classic; Auckland, New Zealand; Tier IV event Hard – $107,500 – 32S/16D; Singles – Doubles	(Belgium) Els Callens (France) Julie Halard-Decugis; 6–1, 6–0	(Canada) Jill Hetherington (Australia) Kristine Radford	(Argentina) Florencia Labat (China) Fang Li	(France) Julie Halard-Decugis (Germany) Sabine Hack (Italy) Rita Grande (Germany) Karin Kschwendt
8 Jan	Schweppes Tasmanian International; Hobart, Australia; Tier IV event Hard – $107,500 – 32S/16D; Singles – Doubles	(France) Julie Halard-Decugis; 6–1, 6–2	(Japan) Mana Endo	(Chinese Taipei) Shi-Ting Wang (Argentina) Florencia Labat	(Austria) Judith Wiesner (Italy) Silvia Farina (Spain) Virginia Ruano Pascual (Japan) Ai Sugiyama
8 Jan	Schweppes Tasmanian International; Hobart, Australia; Tier IV event Hard – $107,500 – 32S/16D; Singles – Doubles	(Indonesia) Yayuk Basuki (Japan) Kyōko Nagatsuka; 7–6, 6–3	(Australia) Kerry-Anne Guse (South Korea) Park Sung-hee	(Chinese Taipei) Shi-Ting Wang (Argentina) Florencia Labat	(Austria) Judith Wiesner (Italy) Silvia Farina (Spain) Virginia Ruano Pascual (Japan) Ai Sugiyama
8 Jan	Peters International; Sydney, Australia; Tier II event Hard – $342,500 – 28S/16D; Singles – Doubles	(United States) Monica Seles; 4–6, 7–6, 6–3	(United States) Lindsay Davenport	(Netherlands) Brenda Schultz-McCarthy (Japan) Kimiko Date	(South Africa) Mariaan de Swardt (United States) Mary Joe Fernández (Australia) Nicole Bradtke (United States) Chanda Rubin
8 Jan	Peters International; Sydney, Australia; Tier II event Hard – $342,500 – 28S/16D; Singles – Doubles	(United States) Lindsay Davenport (United States) Mary Joe Fernández; 6–3, 6–3	(United States) Lori McNeil (Czech Republic) Helena Suková	(Netherlands) Brenda Schultz-McCarthy (Japan) Kimiko Date	(South Africa) Mariaan de Swardt (United States) Mary Joe Fernández (Australia) Nicole Bradtke (United States) Chanda Rubin
15 Jan; 22 Jan	Australian Open; Melbourne, Australia; Grand Slam; Hard – $3,970,600 – 128S/64D/32X; Singles – Doubles – Mixed doubles	(United States) Monica Seles; 6–4, 6–1	(Germany) Anke Huber	(United States) Chanda Rubin (South Africa) Amanda Coetzer	(Croatia) Iva Majoli (Spain) Arantxa Sánchez Vicario (Switzerland) Martina Hingis (Spain) Conchita Martínez
15 Jan; 22 Jan	Australian Open; Melbourne, Australia; Grand Slam; Hard – $3,970,600 – 128S/64D/32X; Singles – Doubles – Mixed doubles	(United States) Chanda Rubin (Spain) Arantxa Sánchez Vicario; 7–5, 2–6, 6–4	(United States) Lindsay Davenport (United States) Mary Joe Fernández	(United States) Chanda Rubin (South Africa) Amanda Coetzer	(Croatia) Iva Majoli (Spain) Arantxa Sánchez Vicario (Switzerland) Martina Hingis (Spain) Conchita Martínez
15 Jan; 22 Jan	Australian Open; Melbourne, Australia; Grand Slam; Hard – $3,970,600 – 128S/64D/32X; Singles – Doubles – Mixed doubles	(Latvia) Larisa Neiland (Australia) Mark Woodforde; 4–6, 7–5, 6–0	(United States) Nicole Arendt (United States) Luke Jensen	(United States) Chanda Rubin (South Africa) Amanda Coetzer	(Croatia) Iva Majoli (Spain) Arantxa Sánchez Vicario (Switzerland) Martina Hingis (Spain) Conchita Martínez
29 Jan	Toray Pan Pacific Open; Tokyo, Japan; Tier I event Carpet (i) – $926,250 – 28S/16D; Singles – Doubles	(Croatia) Iva Majoli; 6–4, 6–1	(Spain) Arantxa Sánchez Vicario	(Switzerland) Martina Hingis (Spain) Conchita Martínez	(United States) Monica Seles (Japan) Naoko Sawamatsu (Bulgaria) Magdalena Maleeva (United States) Lindsay Davenport
29 Jan	Toray Pan Pacific Open; Tokyo, Japan; Tier I event Carpet (i) – $926,250 – 28S/16D; Singles – Doubles	(United States) Gigi Fernández (Belarus) Natasha Zvereva; 7–6, 6–3	(South Africa) Mariaan de Swardt (Romania) Irina Spîrlea	(Switzerland) Martina Hingis (Spain) Conchita Martínez	(United States) Monica Seles (Japan) Naoko Sawamatsu (Bulgaria) Magdalena Maleeva (United States) Lindsay Davenport

=== February ===
Week	Tournament	Champions	Runners-up	Semifinalists	Quarterfinalists
13 Feb	Open Gaz de France; Paris, France; Tier II event Carpet (i) – $450,000 – 28S/16D; Singles – Doubles	(France) Julie Halard-Decugis; 7–5, 7–6	(Croatia) Iva Majoli	(Bulgaria) Magdalena Maleeva (Italy) Silvia Farina	(France) Nathalie Dechy (Netherlands) Miriam Oremans (Germany) Petra Begerow (Germany) Anke Huber
13 Feb	Open Gaz de France; Paris, France; Tier II event Carpet (i) – $450,000 – 28S/16D; Singles – Doubles	(Netherlands) Kristie Boogert (Czech Republic) Jana Novotná; 6–4, 6–3	(France) Julie Halard-Decugis (France) Nathalie Tauziat	(Bulgaria) Magdalena Maleeva (Italy) Silvia Farina	(France) Nathalie Dechy (Netherlands) Miriam Oremans (Germany) Petra Begerow (Germany) Anke Huber
19 Feb	Faber Grand Prix; Essen, Germany; Tier II event Carpet (i) – $450,000 – 28S/16D; Singles – Doubles	(Croatia) Iva Majoli; 7–5, 1–6, 7–6^{(8–6)}	(Czech Republic) Jana Novotná	(Sweden) Åsa Carlsson (Germany) Anke Huber	(Belgium) Els Callens (Australia) Rennae Stubbs (United States) Jennifer Capriati (Germany) Barbara Rittner
19 Feb	Faber Grand Prix; Essen, Germany; Tier II event Carpet (i) – $450,000 – 28S/16D; Singles – Doubles	(United States) Meredith McGrath (Latvia) Larisa Neiland; 3–6, 6–3, 6–2	(United States) Lori McNeil (Czech Republic) Helena Suková	(Sweden) Åsa Carlsson (Germany) Anke Huber	(Belgium) Els Callens (Australia) Rennae Stubbs (United States) Jennifer Capriati (Germany) Barbara Rittner
20 Feb	IGA Classic; Oklahoma City, United States; Tier III event Hard (i) – $164,250 – 32S/16D; Singles – Doubles	(Netherlands) Brenda Schultz-McCarthy; 6–3, 6–2	(South Africa) Amanda Coetzer	(United States) Chanda Rubin (Russia) Elena Likhovtseva	(United States) Katrina Adams (South Africa) Joannette Kruger (United States) Amy Frazier (United States) Lisa Raymond
20 Feb	IGA Classic; Oklahoma City, United States; Tier III event Hard (i) – $164,250 – 32S/16D; Singles – Doubles	(United States) Chanda Rubin (Netherlands) Brenda Schultz-McCarthy; 6–4, 6–3	(United States) Katrina Adams (United States) Debbie Graham	(United States) Chanda Rubin (Russia) Elena Likhovtseva	(United States) Katrina Adams (South Africa) Joannette Kruger (United States) Amy Frazier (United States) Lisa Raymond
26 Feb	EA-Generali Ladies Linz; Linz, Austria; Tier III event Carpet (i) – $164,250 – 32S/16D; Singles – Doubles	(Belgium) Sabine Appelmans; 6–2, 6–4	(France) Julie Halard-Decugis	(Russia) Elena Makarova (Czech Republic) Helena Suková	(Belgium) Laurence Courtois (Austria) Judith Wiesner (Sweden) Åsa Carlsson (Czech Republic) Jana Novotná
26 Feb	EA-Generali Ladies Linz; Linz, Austria; Tier III event Carpet (i) – $164,250 – 32S/16D; Singles – Doubles	(Netherlands) Manon Bollegraf (United States) Meredith McGrath; 6–4, 6–4	(Australia) Rennae Stubbs (Czech Republic) Helena Suková	(Russia) Elena Makarova (Czech Republic) Helena Suková	(Belgium) Laurence Courtois (Austria) Judith Wiesner (Sweden) Åsa Carlsson (Czech Republic) Jana Novotná

=== March ===
Week	Tournament	Champions	Runners-up	Semifinalists	Quarterfinalists
8 Mar	State Farm Evert Cup; Indian Wells, United States; Tier I event Hard – $550,000 – 56S/28D; Singles – Doubles	(Germany) Steffi Graf; 7–6, 7–6	(Spain) Conchita Martínez	(United States) Lindsay Davenport (Japan) Kimiko Date	(South Africa) Amanda Coetzer (United States) Chanda Rubin (France) Nathalie Tauziat (United States) Lindsay Lee
8 Mar	State Farm Evert Cup; Indian Wells, United States; Tier I event Hard – $550,000 – 56S/28D; Singles – Doubles	(United States) Chanda Rubin (Netherlands) Brenda Schultz-McCarthy; 6–1, 6–4	(France) Julie Halard-Decugis (France) Nathalie Tauziat	(United States) Lindsay Davenport (Japan) Kimiko Date	(South Africa) Amanda Coetzer (United States) Chanda Rubin (France) Nathalie Tauziat (United States) Lindsay Lee
21 Mar	Lipton Championships; Key Biscayne, United States; Tier I event Hard – $1,550,000 – 96S/48D; Singles – Doubles	(Germany) Steffi Graf; 6–1, 6–3	(United States) Chanda Rubin	(United States) Lindsay Davenport (Slovakia) Karina Habšudová	(Japan) Kimiko Date (Germany) Anke Huber (Argentina) Gabriela Sabatini (Romania) Irina Spîrlea
21 Mar	Lipton Championships; Key Biscayne, United States; Tier I event Hard – $1,550,000 – 96S/48D; Singles – Doubles	(Czech Republic) Jana Novotná (Spain) Arantxa Sánchez Vicario; 6–4, 6–4	(United States) Meredith McGrath (Latvia) Larisa Neiland	(United States) Lindsay Davenport (Slovakia) Karina Habšudová	(Japan) Kimiko Date (Germany) Anke Huber (Argentina) Gabriela Sabatini (Romania) Irina Spîrlea

=== April ===
Week	Tournament	Champions	Runners-up	Semifinalists	Quarterfinalists
1 Apr	Family Circle Cup; Hilton Head Island, United States; Tier I event Clay – $926,250 – 28S/16D; Singles – Doubles	(Spain) Arantxa Sánchez Vicario; 6–2, 2–6, 6–2	(Austria) Barbara Paulus	(Spain) Conchita Martínez (Czech Republic) Jana Novotná	(Germany) Petra Begerow (Romania) Irina Spîrlea (Croatia) Iva Majoli (Germany) Sabine Hack
1 Apr	Family Circle Cup; Hilton Head Island, United States; Tier I event Clay – $926,250 – 28S/16D; Singles – Doubles	(Czech Republic) Jana Novotná (Spain) Arantxa Sánchez Vicario; 6–2, 6–3	(United States) Gigi Fernández (United States) Mary Joe Fernández	(Spain) Conchita Martínez (Czech Republic) Jana Novotná	(Germany) Petra Begerow (Romania) Irina Spîrlea (Croatia) Iva Majoli (Germany) Sabine Hack
8 Apr	Bausch & Lomb Championships; Amelia Island, United States; Tier II event Clay – $450,000 – 56S/28D; Singles – Doubles	(Romania) Irina Spîrlea; 6–7, 6–4, 6–3	(France) Mary Pierce	(United States) Mary Joe Fernández (Spain) Arantxa Sánchez Vicario	(Spain) Conchita Martínez (Germany) Sabine Hack (Austria) Barbara Schett (United States) Meredith McGrath
8 Apr	Bausch & Lomb Championships; Amelia Island, United States; Tier II event Clay – $450,000 – 56S/28D; Singles – Doubles	(United States) Chanda Rubin (Spain) Arantxa Sánchez Vicario; 6–1, 6–1	(United States) Meredith McGrath (Latvia) Larisa Neiland	(United States) Mary Joe Fernández (Spain) Arantxa Sánchez Vicario	(Spain) Conchita Martínez (Germany) Sabine Hack (Austria) Barbara Schett (United States) Meredith McGrath
8 Apr	Danamon Open; Jakarta, Indonesia; Tier III event Hard – $164,250 – 32S/16D; Singles – Doubles	(United States) Linda Wild; W/O	(Indonesia) Yayuk Basuki	(Japan) Naoko Kijimuta (Belgium) Laurence Courtois	(Belgium) Sabine Appelmans (Japan) Rika Hiraki (Germany) Claudia Porwik (Japan) Kyōko Nagatsuka
8 Apr	Danamon Open; Jakarta, Indonesia; Tier III event Hard – $164,250 – 32S/16D; Singles – Doubles	(Japan) Rika Hiraki (Japan) Naoko Kijimuta; 7–6^{(7–2)}, 7–5	(Belgium) Laurence Courtois (Belgium) Nancy Feber	(Japan) Naoko Kijimuta (Belgium) Laurence Courtois	(Belgium) Sabine Appelmans (Japan) Rika Hiraki (Germany) Claudia Porwik (Japan) Kyōko Nagatsuka
15 Apr	Japan Open Tennis Championships; Tokyo, Japan; Tier III event Hard – $164,250 – 32S/16D; Singles – Doubles	(Japan) Kimiko Date; 7–5, 6–4	(United States) Amy Frazier	(Japan) Ai Sugiyama (Japan) Naoko Kijimuta	(Germany) Karin Kschwendt (Slovakia) Katarína Studeníková (United States) Kimberly Po (United States) Corina Morariu
15 Apr	Japan Open Tennis Championships; Tokyo, Japan; Tier III event Hard – $164,250 – 32S/16D; Singles – Doubles	(Japan) Kimiko Date (Japan) Ai Sugiyama; 7–6, 6–7, 6–3	(United States) Amy Frazier (United States) Kimberly Po	(Japan) Ai Sugiyama (Japan) Naoko Kijimuta	(Germany) Karin Kschwendt (Slovakia) Katarína Studeníková (United States) Kimberly Po (United States) Corina Morariu
22 Apr	Fed Cup first round Salzburg, Austria, Clay; Tokyo, Japan, Hard (i); Amiens, France, Clay; Murcia, Spain, Clay	First round winners United States 3-2; Japan 3-2; France 3–2; Spain 3-2	First round losers Austria; Germany; Argentina; South Africa		
29 Apr	"M" Electronika Cup; Bol, Croatia; Tier IV event Clay – $107,500 – 32S/16D; Singles – Doubles	(Italy) Gloria Pizzichini; 6–0, 6–2	(Croatia) Silvija Talaja	(Italy) Sandra Cecchini (Argentina) Paola Suárez	(Czech Republic) Sandra Kleinová (Austria) Sandra Dopfer (Madagascar) Dally Randriantefy (South Africa) Joannette Kruger
29 Apr	"M" Electronika Cup; Bol, Croatia; Tier IV event Clay – $107,500 – 32S/16D; Singles – Doubles	(Argentina) Laura Montalvo (Argentina) Paola Suárez; 6–7, 6–3, 6–4	(France) Alexia Dechaume-Balleret (France) Alexandra Fusai	(Italy) Sandra Cecchini (Argentina) Paola Suárez	(Czech Republic) Sandra Kleinová (Austria) Sandra Dopfer (Madagascar) Dally Randriantefy (South Africa) Joannette Kruger
29 Apr	Rexona Cup; Hamburg, Germany; Tier II event Clay – $450,000 – 28S/14D; Singles – Doubles	(Spain) Arantxa Sánchez Vicario; 4–6, 7–6, 6–0	(Spain) Conchita Martínez	(France) Julie Halard-Decugis (France) Mary Pierce	(Spain) Ángeles Montolio (Netherlands) Brenda Schultz-McCarthy (Switzerland) Martina Hingis (Romania) Ruxandra Dragomir
29 Apr	Rexona Cup; Hamburg, Germany; Tier II event Clay – $450,000 – 28S/14D; Singles – Doubles	(Spain) Arantxa Sánchez Vicario (Netherlands) Brenda Schultz-McCarthy; 4–6, 7–6, 6–4	(United States) Gigi Fernández (Switzerland) Martina Hingis	(France) Julie Halard-Decugis (France) Mary Pierce	(Spain) Ángeles Montolio (Netherlands) Brenda Schultz-McCarthy (Switzerland) Martina Hingis (Romania) Ruxandra Dragomir

=== May ===
Week	Tournament	Champions	Runners-up	Semifinalists	Quarterfinalists
6 May	Budapest Lotto Open; Budapest, Hungary; Tier IV event Clay – $107,500 – 32S/16D; Singles – Doubles	(Romania) Ruxandra Dragomir; 7–6^{(8–6)}, 6–1	(Austria) Melanie Schnell	(Bulgaria) Elena Pampoulova (Hungary) Rita Kuti-Kis	(France) Julie Halard-Decugis (United States) Meghann Shaughnessy (Hungary) Andrea Temesvári (Slovakia) Denisa Krajčovičová
6 May	Budapest Lotto Open; Budapest, Hungary; Tier IV event Clay – $107,500 – 32S/16D; Singles – Doubles	(United States) Katrina Adams (United States) Debbie Graham; 6–3, 7–6^{(7–3)}	(Czech Republic) Radka Bobková (Czech Republic) Eva Melicharová	(Bulgaria) Elena Pampoulova (Hungary) Rita Kuti-Kis	(France) Julie Halard-Decugis (United States) Meghann Shaughnessy (Hungary) Andrea Temesvári (Slovakia) Denisa Krajčovičová
6 May	Italian Open; Rome, Italy; Tier I event Clay – $926,250 – 56S/28D; Singles – Doubles	(Spain) Conchita Martínez; 6–2, 6–3	(Switzerland) Martina Hingis	(Romania) Irina Spîrlea (Croatia) Iva Majoli	(Germany) Steffi Graf (Spain) Arantxa Sánchez Vicario (France) Nathalie Tauziat (Bulgaria) Magdalena Maleeva
6 May	Italian Open; Rome, Italy; Tier I event Clay – $926,250 – 56S/28D; Singles – Doubles	(Spain) Arantxa Sánchez Vicario (Romania) Irina Spîrlea; 6–4, 3–6, 6–3	(United States) Gigi Fernández (Switzerland) Martina Hingis	(Romania) Irina Spîrlea (Croatia) Iva Majoli	(Germany) Steffi Graf (Spain) Arantxa Sánchez Vicario (France) Nathalie Tauziat (Bulgaria) Magdalena Maleeva
13 May	WTA German Open; Berlin, Germany; Tier I event Clay – $926,250 – 56S/28D; Singles – Doubles	(Germany) Steffi Graf; 4–6, 6–2, 7–5	(Slovakia) Karina Habšudová	(Croatia) Iva Majoli (Russia) Elena Likhovtseva	(France) Nathalie Tauziat (Austria) Barbara Paulus (Germany) Anke Huber (Spain) Arantxa Sánchez Vicario
13 May	WTA German Open; Berlin, Germany; Tier I event Clay – $926,250 – 56S/28D; Singles – Doubles	(United States) Meredith McGrath (Latvia) Larisa Neiland; 6–1, 5–7, 7–6^{(7–4)}	(Switzerland) Martina Hingis (Czech Republic) Helena Suková	(Croatia) Iva Majoli (Russia) Elena Likhovtseva	(France) Nathalie Tauziat (Austria) Barbara Paulus (Germany) Anke Huber (Spain) Arantxa Sánchez Vicario
13 May	Rover Championships; Cardiff, Great Britain; Tier IV event Clay – $107,500 – 32S/16D; Singles – Doubles	(Belgium) Dominique Van Roost; 6–4, 6–2	(Belgium) Laurence Courtois	(Slovakia) Henrieta Nagyová (Canada) Patricia Hy-Boulais	(Japan) Naoko Kijimuta (France) Alexandra Fusai (Netherlands) Miriam Oremans (South Africa) Mariaan de Swardt
13 May	Rover Championships; Cardiff, Great Britain; Tier IV event Clay – $107,500 – 32S/16D; Singles – Doubles	(United States) Katrina Adams (South Africa) Mariaan de Swardt; 6–0, 6–4	(Belgium) Els Callens (Belgium) Laurence Courtois	(Slovakia) Henrieta Nagyová (Canada) Patricia Hy-Boulais	(Japan) Naoko Kijimuta (France) Alexandra Fusai (Netherlands) Miriam Oremans (South Africa) Mariaan de Swardt
20 May	Internationaux de Strasbourg; Strasbourg, France; Tier III event Clay – $164,250 – 32S/16D; Singles – Doubles	(United States) Lindsay Davenport; 6–3, 7–6^{(8–6)}	(Austria) Barbara Paulus	(Austria) Judith Wiesner (Slovakia) Katarína Studeníková	(Germany) Anke Huber (France) Nathalie Tauziat (France) Alexia Dechaume-Balleret (United States) Annie Miller
20 May	Internationaux de Strasbourg; Strasbourg, France; Tier III event Clay – $164,250 – 32S/16D; Singles – Doubles	(Indonesia) Yayuk Basuki (Australia) Nicole Bradtke; 5–7, 6–4, 6–4	(United States) Marianne Werdel (United States) Tami Whitlinger	(Austria) Judith Wiesner (Slovakia) Katarína Studeníková	(Germany) Anke Huber (France) Nathalie Tauziat (France) Alexia Dechaume-Balleret (United States) Annie Miller
20 May	World Doubles Cup; Edinburgh, Great Britain; Clay – $188,125 – 8D; Doubles	(United States) Nicole Arendt (Netherlands) Manon Bollegraf; 6–3, 2–6, 7–6	(United States) Gigi Fernández (Belarus) Natasha Zvereva	(United States) Adams / (South Africa) de Swardt (United States) McGrath / (Latvia) Neiland	(Russia) Makarova / (Russia) Maniokova (United States) Garrison / (United States) Rinaldi (Argentina) Tarabini / (Netherlands) Vis (Canada) Hetherington / (Australia) Radford
20 May	Open Paginas Amarillas; Madrid, Spain; Tier II event Clay – $250,000 – 28S/14D; Singles – Doubles	(Czech Republic) Jana Novotná; 4–6, 6–4, 6–3	(Bulgaria) Magdalena Maleeva	(United States) Monica Seles (Spain) Arantxa Sánchez Vicario	(Romania) Irina Spîrlea (Czech Republic) Ludmila Richterová (Netherlands) Brenda Schultz-McCarthy (South Africa) Amanda Coetzer
20 May	Open Paginas Amarillas; Madrid, Spain; Tier II event Clay – $250,000 – 28S/14D; Singles – Doubles	(Czech Republic) Jana Novotná (Spain) Arantxa Sánchez Vicario; 7–6^{(7–4)}, 6–2	(Belgium) Sabine Appelmans (Netherlands) Miriam Oremans	(United States) Monica Seles (Spain) Arantxa Sánchez Vicario	(Romania) Irina Spîrlea (Czech Republic) Ludmila Richterová (Netherlands) Brenda Schultz-McCarthy (South Africa) Amanda Coetzer
27 May; 3 Jun	French Open; Paris, France; Grand Slam; Clay – $4,456,343 – 128S/64D/32X; Singles – Doubles – Mixed doubles	(Germany) Steffi Graf; 6–3, 6–7^{(4–7)}, 10–8	(Spain) Arantxa Sánchez Vicario	(Spain) Conchita Martínez (Czech Republic) Jana Novotná	(Croatia) Iva Majoli (United States) Lindsay Davenport (Slovakia) Karina Habšudová (United States) Monica Seles
27 May; 3 Jun	French Open; Paris, France; Grand Slam; Clay – $4,456,343 – 128S/64D/32X; Singles – Doubles – Mixed doubles	(United States) Lindsay Davenport (United States) Mary Joe Fernández; 6–2, 6–1	(United States) Gigi Fernández (Belarus) Natasha Zvereva	(Spain) Conchita Martínez (Czech Republic) Jana Novotná	(Croatia) Iva Majoli (United States) Lindsay Davenport (Slovakia) Karina Habšudová (United States) Monica Seles
27 May; 3 Jun	French Open; Paris, France; Grand Slam; Clay – $4,456,343 – 128S/64D/32X; Singles – Doubles – Mixed doubles	(Argentina) Patricia Tarabini (Argentina) Javier Frana; 6–2, 6–2	(United States) Nicole Arendt (United States) Luke Jensen	(Spain) Conchita Martínez (Czech Republic) Jana Novotná	(Croatia) Iva Majoli (United States) Lindsay Davenport (Slovakia) Karina Habšudová (United States) Monica Seles

=== June ===
Week	Tournament	Champions	Runners-up	Semifinalists	Quarterfinalists
10 Jun	DFS Classic; Birmingham, Great Britain; Tier III event Grass – $164,250 – 56S/28D; Singles – Doubles	(United States) Meredith McGrath; 2–6, 6–4, 6–4	(France) Nathalie Tauziat	(Netherlands) Brenda Schultz-McCarthy (Netherlands) Miriam Oremans	(Latvia) Larisa Neiland (Belgium) Els Callens (Germany) Christina Singer (Belgium) Laurence Courtois
10 Jun	DFS Classic; Birmingham, Great Britain; Tier III event Grass – $164,250 – 56S/28D; Singles – Doubles	(Australia) Elizabeth Smylie (United States) Linda Wild; 6–3, 3–6, 6–1	(United States) Lori McNeil (France) Nathalie Tauziat	(Netherlands) Brenda Schultz-McCarthy (Netherlands) Miriam Oremans	(Latvia) Larisa Neiland (Belgium) Els Callens (Germany) Christina Singer (Belgium) Laurence Courtois
17 Jun	Wilkinson Championships; Rosmalen, Netherlands; Tier III event Grass – $164,250 – 32S/16D; Singles – Doubles	(Germany) Anke Huber; 6–4, 7–6	(Czech Republic) Helena Suková	(Austria) Judith Wiesner (Romania) Ruxandra Dragomir	(Croatia) Iva Majoli (Netherlands) Kristie Boogert (Latvia) Larisa Neiland (Belgium) Dominique Van Roost
17 Jun	Wilkinson Championships; Rosmalen, Netherlands; Tier III event Grass – $164,250 – 32S/16D; Singles – Doubles	(Latvia) Larisa Neiland (Netherlands) Brenda Schultz-McCarthy; 6–4, 7–6	(Netherlands) Kristie Boogert (Czech Republic) Helena Suková	(Austria) Judith Wiesner (Romania) Ruxandra Dragomir	(Croatia) Iva Majoli (Netherlands) Kristie Boogert (Latvia) Larisa Neiland (Belgium) Dominique Van Roost
18 Jun	Direct Line International Championships; Eastbourne, Great Britain; Tier II event Grass – $363,000 – 28S/16D; Singles – Doubles	(United States) Monica Seles; 6–0, 6–2	(United States) Mary Joe Fernández	(France) Nathalie Tauziat (Czech Republic) Jana Novotná	(Argentina) Inés Gorrochategui (United States) Lisa Raymond (Indonesia) Yayuk Basuki (Spain) Conchita Martínez
18 Jun	Direct Line International Championships; Eastbourne, Great Britain; Tier II event Grass – $363,000 – 28S/16D; Singles – Doubles	(Czech Republic) Jana Novotná (Spain) Arantxa Sánchez Vicario; 4–6, 7–5, 6–4	(South Africa) Rosalyn Fairbank (United States) Pam Shriver	(France) Nathalie Tauziat (Czech Republic) Jana Novotná	(Argentina) Inés Gorrochategui (United States) Lisa Raymond (Indonesia) Yayuk Basuki (Spain) Conchita Martínez
24 Jun; 1 Jul	Wimbledon Championships; London, Great Britain; Grand Slam; Grass – $3,392,408 – 128S/64D/32X; Singles – Doubles – Mixed doubles	(Germany) Steffi Graf; 6–3, 7–5	(Spain) Arantxa Sánchez Vicario	(Japan) Kimiko Date (United States) Meredith McGrath	(Czech Republic) Jana Novotná (France) Mary Pierce (Austria) Judith Wiesner (United States) Mary Joe Fernández
24 Jun; 1 Jul	Wimbledon Championships; London, Great Britain; Grand Slam; Grass – $3,392,408 – 128S/64D/32X; Singles – Doubles – Mixed doubles	(Switzerland) Martina Hingis (Czech Republic) Helena Suková; 5–7, 7–5, 6–1	(United States) Meredith McGrath (Latvia) Larisa Neiland	(Japan) Kimiko Date (United States) Meredith McGrath	(Czech Republic) Jana Novotná (France) Mary Pierce (Austria) Judith Wiesner (United States) Mary Joe Fernández
24 Jun; 1 Jul	Wimbledon Championships; London, Great Britain; Grand Slam; Grass – $3,392,408 – 128S/64D/32X; Singles – Doubles – Mixed doubles	(Czech Republic) Helena Suková (Czech Republic) Cyril Suk; 1–6, 6–3, 6–2	(Latvia) Larisa Neiland (Australia) Mark Woodforde	(Japan) Kimiko Date (United States) Meredith McGrath	(Czech Republic) Jana Novotná (France) Mary Pierce (Austria) Judith Wiesner (United States) Mary Joe Fernández

=== July ===
Week	Tournament	Champions	Runners-up	Semifinalists	Quarterfinalists
8 Jul	Fed Cup Semifinals; Nagoya, Japan, Carpet (i); Bayonne, France, Carpet (i)	Semifinals winners United States 5–0; Spain 3-2	Semifinals losers Japan; France		
15 Jul	Torneo Internazionali Femminili di Palermo; Palermo, Italy; Tier IV event Clay – $107,500 – 32S/16D; Singles – Doubles	(Austria) Barbara Schett; 6–3, 6–3	(Germany) Sabine Hack	(Germany) Jana Kandarr (Italy) Silvia Farina	(Belgium) Stephanie Devillé (Austria) Sandra Dopfer (France) Sarah Pitkowski (Slovakia) Henrieta Nagyová
15 Jul	Torneo Internazionali Femminili di Palermo; Palermo, Italy; Tier IV event Clay – $107,500 – 32S/16D; Singles – Doubles	(Slovakia) Janette Husárová (Austria) Barbara Schett; 6–1, 6–2	(Argentina) Florencia Labat (Germany) Barbara Rittner	(Germany) Jana Kandarr (Italy) Silvia Farina	(Belgium) Stephanie Devillé (Austria) Sandra Dopfer (France) Sarah Pitkowski (Slovakia) Henrieta Nagyová
23 Jul	Summer Olympics; Atlanta, United States; Summer Olympics; Hard – 64S/32D; Singles – Doubles	Gold	Silver	Bronze	Fourth Place
23 Jul	Summer Olympics; Atlanta, United States; Summer Olympics; Hard – 64S/32D; Singles – Doubles	(United States) Lindsay Davenport; 7–6^{(10–8)}, 6–2	(Spain) Arantxa Sánchez Vicario	(Czech Republic) Jana Novotná; 7–6^{(10–8)}, 6–4	(United States) Mary Joe Fernández
23 Jul	Summer Olympics; Atlanta, United States; Summer Olympics; Hard – 64S/32D; Singles – Doubles	(United States) Gigi Fernández (United States) Mary Joe Fernández; 7–6^{(8–6)}, 6–4	(Czech Republic) Jana Novotná (Czech Republic) Helena Suková	(Spain) Conchita Martínez (Spain) Arantxa Sánchez Vicario; 6–1, 6–3	(Netherlands) Manon Bollegraf (Netherlands) Brenda Schultz-McCarthy

=== August ===
Week	Tournament	Champions	Runners-up	Semifinalists	Quarterfinalists
5 Aug	du Maurier Open; Montreal, Canada; Tier I event Hard – $926,250 – 56S/28D; Singles – Doubles	(United States) Monica Seles; 6–1, 7–6	(Spain) Arantxa Sánchez Vicario	(Indonesia) Yayuk Basuki (United States) Kimberly Po	(Bulgaria) Magdalena Maleeva (United States) Amy Frazier (United States) Mary Joe Fernández (Argentina) Florencia Labat
5 Aug	du Maurier Open; Montreal, Canada; Tier I event Hard – $926,250 – 56S/28D; Singles – Doubles	(Latvia) Larisa Neiland (Spain) Arantxa Sánchez Vicario; 7–6, 6–1	(United States) Mary Joe Fernández (Czech Republic) Helena Suková	(Indonesia) Yayuk Basuki (United States) Kimberly Po	(Bulgaria) Magdalena Maleeva (United States) Amy Frazier (United States) Mary Joe Fernández (Argentina) Florencia Labat
5 Aug	Meta Styrian Open; Maria Lankowitz, Austria; Tier IV event Clay – $107,500 – 32S/16D; Singles – Doubles	(Austria) Barbara Paulus; 0-0 ret	(Italy) Sandra Cecchini	(Belgium) Stephanie Devillé (Croatia) Silvija Talaja	(Czech Republic) Petra Langrová (Spain) Cristina Torrens Valero (Argentina) Bettina Villella (Czech Republic) Lenka Cenková
5 Aug	Meta Styrian Open; Maria Lankowitz, Austria; Tier IV event Clay – $107,500 – 32S/16D; Singles – Doubles	(Slovakia) Janette Husárová (Ukraine) Natalia Medvedeva; 6–4, 7–5	(Czech Republic) Lenka Cenková (Czech Republic) Kateřina Kroupová	(Belgium) Stephanie Devillé (Croatia) Silvija Talaja	(Czech Republic) Petra Langrová (Spain) Cristina Torrens Valero (Argentina) Bettina Villella (Czech Republic) Lenka Cenková
12 Aug	Acura Classic; Manhattan Beach, United States; Tier II event Hard – $450,000 – 56S/28D; Singles – Doubles	(United States) Lindsay Davenport; 6–2 6–3	(Germany) Anke Huber	(Germany) Steffi Graf (Slovakia) Karina Habšudová	(United States) Amy Frazier (South Africa) Amanda Coetzer (Japan) Kimiko Date (Romania) Irina Spîrlea
12 Aug	Acura Classic; Manhattan Beach, United States; Tier II event Hard – $450,000 – 56S/28D; Singles – Doubles	(United States) Lindsay Davenport (Belarus) Natasha Zvereva; 6–1, 6–4	(United States) Amy Frazier (United States) Kimberly Po	(Germany) Steffi Graf (Slovakia) Karina Habšudová	(United States) Amy Frazier (South Africa) Amanda Coetzer (Japan) Kimiko Date (Romania) Irina Spîrlea
19 Aug	Toshiba Classic; San Diego, United States; Tier II event Hard – $450,000 – 28S/16D; Singles – Doubles	(Japan) Kimiko Date; 3–6, 6–3, 6–0	(Spain) Arantxa Sánchez Vicario	(Czech Republic) Jana Novotná (Spain) Conchita Martínez	(Slovakia) Katarína Studeníková (France) Sandrine Testud (Argentina) Gabriela Sabatini (France) Nathalie Tauziat
19 Aug	Toshiba Classic; San Diego, United States; Tier II event Hard – $450,000 – 28S/16D; Singles – Doubles	(United States) Gigi Fernández (Spain) Conchita Martínez; 4–6, 6–3, 6–4	(Latvia) Larisa Neiland (Spain) Arantxa Sánchez Vicario	(Czech Republic) Jana Novotná (Spain) Conchita Martínez	(Slovakia) Katarína Studeníková (France) Sandrine Testud (Argentina) Gabriela Sabatini (France) Nathalie Tauziat
26 Aug; 2 Sep	US Open; New York City, United States; Grand Slam; Hard – $4,624,000 – 128S/64D/32X; Singles – Doubles – Mixed doubles	(Germany) Steffi Graf; 7–5, 6–4	(United States) Monica Seles	(Switzerland) Martina Hingis (Spain) Conchita Martínez	(Austria) Judith Wiesner (Czech Republic) Jana Novotná (United States) Linda Wild (South Africa) Amanda Coetzer
26 Aug; 2 Sep	US Open; New York City, United States; Grand Slam; Hard – $4,624,000 – 128S/64D/32X; Singles – Doubles – Mixed doubles	(United States) Gigi Fernández (Belarus) Natasha Zvereva; 1–6, 6–1, 6–4	(Czech Republic) Jana Novotná (Spain) Arantxa Sánchez Vicario	(Switzerland) Martina Hingis (Spain) Conchita Martínez	(Austria) Judith Wiesner (Czech Republic) Jana Novotná (United States) Linda Wild (South Africa) Amanda Coetzer
26 Aug; 2 Sep	US Open; New York City, United States; Grand Slam; Hard – $4,624,000 – 128S/64D/32X; Singles – Doubles – Mixed doubles	(United States) Lisa Raymond (United States) Patrick Galbraith; 7–6, 7–6	(Netherlands) Manon Bollegraf (United States) Rick Leach	(Switzerland) Martina Hingis (Spain) Conchita Martínez	(Austria) Judith Wiesner (Czech Republic) Jana Novotná (United States) Linda Wild (South Africa) Amanda Coetzer

=== September ===
Week	Tournament	Champions	Runners-up	Semifinalists	Quarterfinalists
10 Sep	Pupp Czech Open; Karlovy Vary, Czech Republic; Tier IV event Clay – $160,000 – 32S/16D; Singles – Doubles	(Romania) Ruxandra Dragomir; 6–2, 3–6, 6–4	(Switzerland) Patty Schnyder	(Czech Republic) Lenka Cenková (Slovakia) Katarína Studeníková	(Italy) Flora Perfetti (Slovakia) Henrieta Nagyová (Switzerland) Emmanuelle Gagliardi (Croatia) Silvija Talaja
10 Sep	Pupp Czech Open; Karlovy Vary, Czech Republic; Tier IV event Clay – $160,000 – 32S/16D; Singles – Doubles	(Slovakia) Karina Habšudová (Czech Republic) Helena Suková; 3–6, 6–3, 6–2	(Czech Republic) Eva Martincová (Bulgaria) Elena Pampoulova	(Czech Republic) Lenka Cenková (Slovakia) Katarína Studeníková	(Italy) Flora Perfetti (Slovakia) Henrieta Nagyová (Switzerland) Emmanuelle Gagliardi (Croatia) Silvija Talaja
16 Sep	Nichirei International Championships; Tokyo, Japan; Tier II event Hard – $450,000 – 28S/14D; Singles – Doubles	(United States) Monica Seles; 6–1, 6–4	(Spain) Arantxa Sánchez Vicario	(Japan) Kimiko Date (United States) Kimberly Po	(Japan) Naoko Sawamatsu (South Africa) Amanda Coetzer (France) Mary Pierce (Chinese Taipei) Shi-Ting Wang
16 Sep	Nichirei International Championships; Tokyo, Japan; Tier II event Hard – $450,000 – 28S/14D; Singles – Doubles	(South Africa) Amanda Coetzer (France) Mary Pierce; 6–3, 7–6	(South Korea) Park Sung-hee (Chinese Taipei) Wang Shi-ting	(Japan) Kimiko Date (United States) Kimberly Po	(Japan) Naoko Sawamatsu (South Africa) Amanda Coetzer (France) Mary Pierce (Chinese Taipei) Shi-Ting Wang
16 Sep	Warsaw Cup by Heros; Warsaw, Poland; Tier III event Clay – $164,250 – 32S/16D; Singles – Doubles	(Slovakia) Henrieta Nagyová; 3–6, 6–2, 6–1	(Austria) Barbara Paulus	(Slovakia) Janette Husárová (Slovakia) Karina Habšudová	(Slovakia) Katarína Studeníková (Italy) Flora Perfetti (Italy) Silvia Farina (Romania) Cătălina Cristea
16 Sep	Warsaw Cup by Heros; Warsaw, Poland; Tier III event Clay – $164,250 – 32S/16D; Singles – Doubles	(Ukraine) Olga Lugina (Bulgaria) Elena Pampoulova; 1–6, 6–4, 7–5	(France) Alexandra Fusai (Italy) Laura Garrone	(Slovakia) Janette Husárová (Slovakia) Karina Habšudová	(Slovakia) Katarína Studeníková (Italy) Flora Perfetti (Italy) Silvia Farina (Romania) Cătălina Cristea
23 Sep	Fed Cup Final; Atlantic City, United States, Carpet (i)	United States; 5-0	Spain		
30 Sep	Sparkassen Cup; Leipzig, Germany; Tier II event Carpet (i) – $450,000 – 28S/12D; Singles – Doubles	(Germany) Anke Huber; 5–7, 6–3, 6–1	(Croatia) Iva Majoli	(Germany) Steffi Graf (Czech Republic) Helena Suková	(Austria) Judith Wiesner (Bulgaria) Magdalena Maleeva (United States) Lindsay Davenport (Spain) Arantxa Sánchez Vicario
30 Sep	Sparkassen Cup; Leipzig, Germany; Tier II event Carpet (i) – $450,000 – 28S/12D; Singles – Doubles	(Netherlands) Kristie Boogert (France) Nathalie Tauziat; 6–4, 6–4	(Belgium) Sabine Appelmans (Netherlands) Miriam Oremans	(Germany) Steffi Graf (Czech Republic) Helena Suková	(Austria) Judith Wiesner (Bulgaria) Magdalena Maleeva (United States) Lindsay Davenport (Spain) Arantxa Sánchez Vicario

=== October ===
Week	Tournament	Champions	Runners-up	Semifinalists	Quarterfinalists
7 Oct	Porsche Tennis Grand Prix; Filderstadt, Germany; Tier II event Hard (i) – $450,000 – 28S/16D; Singles – Doubles	(Switzerland) Martina Hingis; 6–2, 3–6, 6–3	(Germany) Anke Huber	(United States) Lindsay Davenport (Austria) Judith Wiesner	(Spain) Arantxa Sánchez Vicario (Czech Republic) Jana Novotná (Croatia) Iva Majoli (Spain) Conchita Martínez
7 Oct	Porsche Tennis Grand Prix; Filderstadt, Germany; Tier II event Hard (i) – $450,000 – 28S/16D; Singles – Doubles	(United States) Nicole Arendt (Czech Republic) Jana Novotná; 6–2, 6–3	(Switzerland) Martina Hingis (Czech Republic) Helena Suková	(United States) Lindsay Davenport (Austria) Judith Wiesner	(Spain) Arantxa Sánchez Vicario (Czech Republic) Jana Novotná (Croatia) Iva Majoli (Spain) Conchita Martínez
7 Oct	Wismilak International; Surabaya, Indonesia; Tier IV event Hard – $155,340 – 32S/16D; Singles – Doubles	(Chinese Taipei) Shi-Ting Wang; 6–4, 6–0	(Japan) Nana Miyagi	(Czech Republic) Adriana Gerši (Japan) Yuka Yoshida	(Czech Republic) Ludmila Richterová (France) Nathalie Dechy (Japan) Haruka Inoue (France) Sarah Pitkowski
7 Oct	Wismilak International; Surabaya, Indonesia; Tier IV event Hard – $155,340 – 32S/16D; Singles – Doubles	(France) Alexandra Fusai (Australia) Kerry-Anne Guse; 6–4, 6–4	(Slovenia) Tina Križan (France) Noëlle van Lottum	(Czech Republic) Adriana Gerši (Japan) Yuka Yoshida	(Czech Republic) Ludmila Richterová (France) Nathalie Dechy (Japan) Haruka Inoue (France) Sarah Pitkowski
14 Oct	European Indoors; Zürich, Switzerland; Tier I event Carpet (i) – $926,250 – 28S/16D; Singles – Doubles	(Czech Republic) Jana Novotná; 6–2, 6–2	(Switzerland) Martina Hingis	(Germany) Anke Huber (Croatia) Iva Majoli	(Belgium) Sabine Appelmans (Italy) Silvia Farina (United States) Jennifer Capriati (Netherlands) Brenda Schultz-McCarthy
14 Oct	European Indoors; Zürich, Switzerland; Tier I event Carpet (i) – $926,250 – 28S/16D; Singles – Doubles	(Switzerland) Martina Hingis (Czech Republic) Helena Suková; 7–5, 6–4	(United States) Nicole Arendt (Belarus) Natasha Zvereva	(Germany) Anke Huber (Croatia) Iva Majoli	(Belgium) Sabine Appelmans (Italy) Silvia Farina (United States) Jennifer Capriati (Netherlands) Brenda Schultz-McCarthy
14 Oct	Nokia Open; Beijing, China; Tier IV event Hard (i) – $107,500 – 32S/16D; Singles – Doubles	(Chinese Taipei) Wang Shi-ting; 6–3, 6–4	(China) Chen Li-Ling	(Thailand) Tamarine Tanasugarn (France) Sandrine Testud	(United States) Linda Wild (Japan) Naoko Kijimuta (Japan) Mana Endo (Indonesia) Yayuk Basuki
14 Oct	Nokia Open; Beijing, China; Tier IV event Hard (i) – $107,500 – 32S/16D; Singles – Doubles	(Japan) Naoko Kijimuta (Japan) Miho Saeki; 7–5, 6–4	(Japan) Yuko Hosoki (Japan) Kazue Takuma	(Thailand) Tamarine Tanasugarn (France) Sandrine Testud	(United States) Linda Wild (Japan) Naoko Kijimuta (Japan) Mana Endo (Indonesia) Yayuk Basuki
21 Oct	Bell Challenge; Quebec City, Canada; Tier III event Carpet (i) – $164,250 – 32S/16D; Singles – Doubles	(United States) Lisa Raymond; 6–4, 6–4	(Belgium) Els Callens	(United States) Tami Whitlinger-Jones (Russia) Elena Likhovtseva	(Netherlands) Brenda Schultz-McCarthy (United States) Kimberly Po (Argentina) Florencia Labat (United States) Jolene Watanabe
21 Oct	Bell Challenge; Quebec City, Canada; Tier III event Carpet (i) – $164,250 – 32S/16D; Singles – Doubles	(United States) Debbie Graham (Netherlands) Brenda Schultz-McCarthy; 6–1, 6–4	(United States) Amy Frazier (United States) Kimberly Po	(United States) Tami Whitlinger-Jones (Russia) Elena Likhovtseva	(Netherlands) Brenda Schultz-McCarthy (United States) Kimberly Po (Argentina) Florencia Labat (United States) Jolene Watanabe
21 Oct	SEAT Open; Kockelscheuer, Luxembourg; Tier III event Carpet (i) – $164,250 – 32S/16D; Singles – Doubles	(Germany) Anke Huber; 6–3, 6–0	(Slovakia) Karina Habšudová	(France) Anne-Gaëlle Sidot (Austria) Barbara Paulus	(Belarus) Natasha Zvereva (Slovakia) Katarína Studeníková (Belgium) Sabine Appelmans (Slovakia) Henrieta Nagyová
21 Oct	SEAT Open; Kockelscheuer, Luxembourg; Tier III event Carpet (i) – $164,250 – 32S/16D; Singles – Doubles	(Netherlands) Kristie Boogert (France) Nathalie Tauziat; 2–6, 6–4, 6–2	(Germany) Barbara Rittner (Belgium) Dominique Van Roost	(France) Anne-Gaëlle Sidot (Austria) Barbara Paulus	(Belarus) Natasha Zvereva (Slovakia) Katarína Studeníková (Belgium) Sabine Appelmans (Slovakia) Henrieta Nagyová
28 Oct	Kremlin Cup; Moscow, Russia; Tier III event Carpet (i) – $400,000 – 30S/16D; Singles – Doubles	(Spain) Conchita Martínez; 6–1, 4–6, 6–4	(Austria) Barbara Paulus	(Belgium) Sabine Appelmans (Austria) Barbara Schett	(Slovakia) Katarína Studeníková (Romania) Ruxandra Dragomir (Ukraine) Elena Tatarkova (Russia) Elena Makarova
28 Oct	Kremlin Cup; Moscow, Russia; Tier III event Carpet (i) – $400,000 – 30S/16D; Singles – Doubles	(Ukraine) Natalia Medvedeva (Latvia) Larisa Neiland; 7–6, 4–6, 6–1	(Italy) Silvia Farina Elia (Austria) Barbara Schett	(Belgium) Sabine Appelmans (Austria) Barbara Schett	(Slovakia) Katarína Studeníková (Romania) Ruxandra Dragomir (Ukraine) Elena Tatarkova (Russia) Elena Makarova
28 Oct	Ameritech Cup; Chicago, United States; Tier II event Carpet (i) – $450,000 – 28S/16D; Singles – Doubles	(Czech Republic) Jana Novotná; 6–4, 3–6, 6–1	(United States) Jennifer Capriati	(United States) Monica Seles (Switzerland) Martina Hingis	(Romania) Irina Spîrlea (United States) Meredith McGrath (United States) Lindsay Davenport (Netherlands) Brenda Schultz-McCarthy
28 Oct	Ameritech Cup; Chicago, United States; Tier II event Carpet (i) – $450,000 – 28S/16D; Singles – Doubles	(United States) Lisa Raymond (Australia) Rennae Stubbs; 6–1, 6–1	(United States) Angela Lettiere (Japan) Nana Miyagi	(United States) Monica Seles (Switzerland) Martina Hingis	(Romania) Irina Spîrlea (United States) Meredith McGrath (United States) Lindsay Davenport (Netherlands) Brenda Schultz-McCarthy

=== November ===
Week	Tournament	Champions	Runners-up	Semifinalists	Quarterfinalists
4 Nov	Bank of the West Classic; Oakland, United States; Tier II event Carpet (i) – $450,000 – 28S/16D; Singles – Doubles	(Switzerland) Martina Hingis; 6–2, 6–0	(United States) Monica Seles	(Romania) Irina Spîrlea (Netherlands) Brenda Schultz-McCarthy	(United States) Kimberly Po (Russia) Elena Likhovtseva (United States) Linda Wild (United States) Lindsay Davenport
4 Nov	Bank of the West Classic; Oakland, United States; Tier II event Carpet (i) – $450,000 – 28S/16D; Singles – Doubles	(United States) Lindsay Davenport (United States) Mary Joe Fernández; 6–1, 6–3	(Romania) Irina Spîrlea (France) Nathalie Tauziat	(Romania) Irina Spîrlea (Netherlands) Brenda Schultz-McCarthy	(United States) Kimberly Po (Russia) Elena Likhovtseva (United States) Linda Wild (United States) Lindsay Davenport
11 Nov	Advanta Championships of Philadelphia; Philadelphia, United States; Tier II event Carpet (i) – $450,000 – 28S/16D; Singles – Doubles	(Czech Republic) Jana Novotná; 6–4 ret	(Germany) Steffi Graf	(United States) Marianne Witmeyer (Indonesia) Yayuk Basuki	(United States) Chanda Rubin (Austria) Barbara Paulus (United States) Annie Miller (United States) Lisa Raymond
11 Nov	Advanta Championships of Philadelphia; Philadelphia, United States; Tier II event Carpet (i) – $450,000 – 28S/16D; Singles – Doubles	(United States) Lisa Raymond (Australia) Rennae Stubbs; 6–4, 3–6, 6–3	(United States) Nicole Arendt (United States) Lori McNeil	(United States) Marianne Witmeyer (Indonesia) Yayuk Basuki	(United States) Chanda Rubin (Austria) Barbara Paulus (United States) Annie Miller (United States) Lisa Raymond
18 Nov	Chase Championships; New York City, United States; WTA Tour Championships; Carpet (i) – $2,000,000 – 16S/8D; Singles – Doubles	(Germany) Steffi Graf; 6–3, 4–6, 6–0, 4–6, 6–0	(Switzerland) Martina Hingis	(Czech Republic) Jana Novotná (Croatia) Iva Majoli	(United States) Lindsay Davenport (Spain) Arantxa Sánchez Vicario (Spain) Conchita Martínez (Japan) Kimiko Date
18 Nov	Chase Championships; New York City, United States; WTA Tour Championships; Carpet (i) – $2,000,000 – 16S/8D; Singles – Doubles	(United States) Lindsay Davenport (United States) Mary Joe Fernández; 6–3, 6–2	(Czech Republic) Jana Novotná (Spain) Arantxa Sánchez Vicario	(Czech Republic) Jana Novotná (Croatia) Iva Majoli	(United States) Lindsay Davenport (Spain) Arantxa Sánchez Vicario (Spain) Conchita Martínez (Japan) Kimiko Date
18 Nov	Volvo Women's Open; Pattaya City, Thailand; Tier IV event Hard – $107,500 – 32S/16D; Singles – Doubles	(Romania) Ruxandra Dragomir; 7–6, 6–4	(Thailand) Tamarine Tanasugarn	(Czech Republic) Denisa Chládková (Slovakia) Henrieta Nagyová	(Japan) Miho Saeki (Argentina) Florencia Labat (Slovakia) Janette Husárová (Japan) Yuka Yoshida
18 Nov	Volvo Women's Open; Pattaya City, Thailand; Tier IV event Hard – $107,500 – 32S/16D; Singles – Doubles	(Japan) Miho Saeki (Japan) Yuka Yoshida; 6–2, 6–3	(Slovenia) Tina Križan (Japan) Nana Miyagi	(Czech Republic) Denisa Chládková (Slovakia) Henrieta Nagyová	(Japan) Miho Saeki (Argentina) Florencia Labat (Slovakia) Janette Husárová (Japan) Yuka Yoshida

== Statistical Information ==
These tables present the number of singles (S), doubles (D), and mixed doubles (X) titles won by each player and each nation during the season, within all the tournament categories of the 1996 WTA World Tour: the Grand Slam tournaments, the Year-end championships and the Tier I, Tier II, Tier III and Tier IV tournaments. The players/nations are sorted by:

1. total number of titles (a doubles title won by two players representing the same nation counts as only one win for the nation);
2. highest amount of highest category tournaments (for example, having a single Grand Slam gives preference over any kind of combination without a Grand Slam title);
3. a singles > doubles > mixed doubles hierarchy;
4. alphabetical order (by family names for players).

=== Titles won by player ===
Total titles	Player	Grand Slam tournaments			Year-end championships		Tier I tournaments		Tier II tournaments		Tier III tournaments		Tier IV tournaments		All titles		
Total titles	Player	S	D	X	S	D	S	D	S	D	S	D	S	D	S	D	X
11	(Spain) Arantxa Sánchez Vicario		1				1	4	1	4					2	9	0
1	(United States) Sandra Cacic												1		1	0	0
1	(Belgium) Els Callens													1	0	1	0
3	(France) Julie Halard-Decugis								1				1	1	2	1	0
2	(Indonesia) Yayuk Basuki											1		1	0	2	0
5	(United States) Monica Seles	1					1		3						5	0	0
7	(United States) Lindsay Davenport		1			1			1	3	1				2	5	0
4	(United States) Mary Joe Fernández		1			1				2					0	4	0
4	(United States) Chanda Rubin		1					1		1		1			0	4	0
6	(Latvia) Larisa Neiland			1			0	2		1		2			0	5	1
2	(Croatia) Iva Majoli						1		1						2	0	0
1	(Japan) Kyōko Nagatsuka													1	0	1	0
3	(United States) Gigi Fernández		1					1		1					0	3	0
3	(Belarus) Natasha Zvereva		1					1		1					0	3	0
3	(Netherlands) Kristie Boogert									2		1			0	3	0
10	(Czech Republic) Jana Novotná						1	2	3	4					4	6	0
4	(United States) Meredith McGrath							1	1		1	1			2	2	0
6	(Netherlands) Brenda Schultz-McCarthy							1		1	1	3			1	5	0
1	(Belgium) Sabine Appelmans										1				1	0	0
2	(Netherlands) Manon Bollegraf ^{[a]}											1			0	2	0
7	(Germany) Steffi Graf	3			1		3										
	(Romania) Irina Spîrlea																
	(United States) Linda Wild																
	(Japan) Rika Hiraki																
	(Japan) Naoko Kijimuta																
	(Japan) Kimiko Date																
	(Japan) Ai Sugiyama																
	(Italy) Gloria Pizzichini																
	(Argentina) Laura Montalvo																
	(Argentina) Paola Suárez																

List of players and singles titles won, last name alphabetically:

- (Germany) Steffi Graf – Indian Wells, Miami, Berlin, French Open, Wimbledon, US Open, WTA Championships (7)
- (United States) Monica Seles – Sydney, Australian Open, Eastbourne, Montreal, Tokyo (Tier II) (5)
- (Czech Republic) Jana Novotná – Madrid, Zurich, Chicago, Philadelphia (4)
- (Romania) Ruxandra Dragomir – Budapest, Karlovy Vary, Pattaya City (3)
- (Germany) Anke Huber – Rosmalen, Leipzig, Luxembourg (3)
- (Japan) Kimiko Date – Tokyo (Tier III), San Diego (2)
- (United States) Lindsay Davenport – Strasbourg, Manhattan Beach (2)
- (France) Julie Halard-Decugis – Hobart, Paris (2)
- (Switzerland) Martina Hingis – Filderstadt, Oakland (2)
- (Croatia) Iva Majoli – Tokyo (Tier I), Essen (2)
- (Spain) Conchita Martínez – Rome, Moscow (2)
- (Spain) Arantxa Sánchez Vicario – Hilton Head, Hamburg (2)
- (Chinese Taipei) Shi-Ting Wang – Surabaya, Beijing (2)
- (United States) Sandra Cacic – Auckland (1)
- (United States) Meredith McGrath – Birmingham (1)
- (Slovakia) Henrieta Nagyová – Warsaw (1)
- (Austria) Barbara Paulus – Maria Lankowitz (1)
- (Italy) Gloria Pizzichini – Bol (1)
- (United States) Lisa Raymond – Quebec City (1)
- (Austria) Barbara Schett – Palermo (1)
- (Netherlands) Brenda Schultz-McCarthy – Oklahoma City (1)
- (Romania) Irina Spîrlea – Amelia Island (1)
- (Belgium) Dominique Van Roost – Cardiff (1)
- (United States) Linda Wild – Jakarta (1)

The following players won their first title:

- (United States) Sandra Cacic
- (Italy) Gloria Pizzichini
- (Romania) Ruxandra Dragomir
- (Belgium) Dominique Van Roost
- (Austria) Barbara Schett
- (Slovakia) Henrieta Nagyová
- (Switzerland) Martina Hingis
- (United States) Lisa Raymond

== Rankings ==
Below are the 1996 WTA year-end rankings in both singles and doubles competition:

Singles Year-end Ranking
No	Player Name	Points	1995	Change
1	Steffi Graf (GER)	4,649	1	=
2	Monica Seles (USA)	4,056	1	-1
3	Arantxa Sánchez Vicario (ESP)	3,668	3	=
4	Conchita Martínez (ESP)	3,180	2	-2
5	Jana Novotná (CZE)	3,087	11	+6
6	Martina Hingis (SUI)	3,051	16	+10
7	Anke Huber (GER)	2,689	10	+3
8	Iva Majoli (CRO)	2,647	9	+1
9	Lindsay Davenport (USA)	2,357	12	+2
10	Irina Spîrlea (ROU)	1,748	21	+11
11	Karina Habšudová (SVK)	1,707	56	+45
12	Brenda Schultz-McCarthy (NED)	1,559	13	+1
13	Barbara Paulus (AUT)	1,492	23	+9
14	Amanda Coetzer (RSA)	1,484	19	+5
15	Judith Wiesner (AUT)	1,451	25	+10
16	Mary Joe Fernández (USA)	1,212	8	-11
17	Chanda Rubin (USA)	1,187	15	-2
18	Elena Likhovtseva (RUS)	1,182	45	+27
19	Magdalena Maleeva (BUL)	1,126	6	-13
20	Julie Halard-Decugis (FRA)	1,111	50	+30

Doubles Year-end Ranking
No	Player Name	Points	1995	Change
1	Arantxa Sánchez Vicario (ESP)	6,273	1	=
2	Larisa Neiland (LAT)	5,371	5	+3
3	Jana Novotná (CZE)	4,793	2	-1
4	Gigi Fernández (USA)	4,631	3	-1
5	Mary Joe Fernández (USA)	4,590	10	+5
6	Helena Suková (CZE)	4,519	9	+3
7	Lindsay Davenport (USA)	4,287	6	-1
8	Meredith McGrath (USA)	4,163	7	-1
9	Natasha Zvereva (BLR)	4,031	4	-5
10	Martina Hingis (SUI)	3,622	29	+19
11	Nicole Arendt (USA)	3,289	11	=
12	Lisa Raymond (USA)	2,809	16	+4
13	Lori McNeil (USA)	2,580	15	+2
14	Nathalie Tauziat (FRA)	2,361	20	+6
15	Manon Bollegraf (NED)	2,312	8	-7
16	Chanda Rubin (USA)	2,253	33	+17
17	Kristie Boogert (NED)	2,250	31	+14
18	Brenda Schultz-McCarthy (NED)	2,209	12	-6
19	Caroline Vis (NED)	2,198	39	+20
20	Yayuk Basuki (INA)	2,185	53	+33

== See also ==
- 1996 ATP Tour
