= 1996 Nichirei International Championships =

- Date: September 16–22
- Edition: 7th
- Category: Tier II
- Draw: 28S / 14D
- Prize money: $450,000
- Surface: Hard / outdoor
- Location: Tokyo, Japan
- Venue: Ariake Coliseum

Champions

Singles
- (United States) Monica Seles

Doubles
- (South Africa) Amanda Coetzer / (France) Mary Pierce
← 1995 ·	Nichirei International Championships

The 1996 Nichirei International Championships was a tennis tournament played on outdoor hard courts at the Ariake Coliseum in Tokyo, Japan that was part of Tier II of the 1996 WTA Tour. It was the seventh and final edition of the tournament and was held from September 16 through September 22, 1996. First-seeded Monica Seles won the singles title, her third at the event after 1991 and 1992.

== Finals ==
=== Singles ===
(United States) Monica Seles defeated (Spain) Arantxa Sánchez Vicario 6–1, 6–4

- It was Seles' 4th singles title of the year and the 38th of her career.

=== Doubles ===
(South Africa) Amanda Coetzer / (France) Mary Pierce defeated (South Korea) Sung-Hee Park / (Chinese Taipei) Shi-Ting Wang 6–3, 7–6

- It was Coetzer's only title of the year and the 9th of her career. It was Pierce's only title of the year and the 9th of her career.
