= 1995 Nichirei International Championships – Singles =

Singles
- 1995 Nichirei International Championships

Final
- Champion: (France) Mary Pierce
- Runner-up: (Spain) Arantxa Sánchez Vicario
- Score: 6–3, 6–3

Details
- Draw: 28 (2WC/4Q/2LL)
- Seeds: 8

Events
Singles	Doubles
← 1994 ·	Nichirei International Championships	· 1996 →

Arantxa Sánchez Vicario was the defending champion, but lost in the final to Mary Pierce. The score was 6–3, 6–3.

== Seeds ==
The first four seeds receive a bye into the second round.

1. (Spain) Arantxa Sánchez Vicario (final)
2. (France) Mary Pierce (champion)
3. (Japan) Kimiko Date (second round)
4. (Argentina) Gabriela Sabatini (semifinals)
5. (United States) Lindsay Davenport (quarterfinals)
6. (n/a)
7. (United States) Amy Frazier (quarterfinals)
8. (Japan) Naoko Sawamatsu (quarterfinals)
9. (United States) Marianne Werdel-Witmeyer (first round)

== Draw ==
=== Key ===
- Q = Qualifier
- WC = Wild card
- LL = Lucky loser
- Alt = Alternate
- SE = Special exempt
- PR = Protected ranking
- ITF = ITF entry
- JE = Junior exempt
- w/o = Walkover
- r = Retired
- d = Defaulted
- SR = Special ranking

=== Finals ===
Semifinals
1	(Spain) Arantxa Sánchez Vicario	6	6
4	(Argentina) Gabriela Sabatini	3	3
(South Africa) Amanda Coetzer	0	2
2	(France) Mary Pierce	6	6

Final
1	(Spain) Arantxa Sánchez Vicario	3	3
2	(France) Mary Pierce	6	6

=== Top half ===
First round
(France) L Ghirardi-Rubbi	0	2
Q	(United States) K Po	6	6
LL	(China) F Li	6^{3}	6	3
WC	(Japan) Y Yoshida	7^{7}	4	6
Q	(Japan) H Mochizuki	1	1
8	(Japan) N Sawamatsu	6	6
WC	(Japan) H Inoue	6^{4}	0
(Japan) M Endo	7^{7}	6
(Japan) A Sugiyama	6	7^{7}
Q	(Japan) K Takuma	0	6^{2}
LL	(United States) S Reece	0	1
5	(United States) L Davenport	6	6

Second round
1	(Spain) A Sánchez Vicario	7	6
Q	(United States) K Po	5	3
WC	(Japan) Y Yoshida	2	0
8	(Japan) N Sawamatsu	6	6
4	(Argentina) G Sabatini	6	6
(Japan) M Endo	1	2
(Japan) A Sugiyama	2	6	2
5	(United States) L Davenport	6	3	6

Quarterfinals
1	(Spain) A Sánchez Vicario	6	2	6
8	(Japan) N Sawamatsu	4	6	2
4	(Argentina) G Sabatini	6	6
5	(United States) L Davenport	2	2

Semifinals
1	(Spain) A Sánchez Vicario	6	6
4	(Argentina) G Sabatini	3	3

=== Bottom half ===
First round
9	(United States) M Werdel-Witmeyer	5	7	6^{5}
(South Africa) A Coetzer	7	5	7^{7}
(Chinese Taipei) S-t Wang	6	6
(United States) S Stafford	1	2
(Canada) J Nejedly	6	4	2
(South Korea) S-h Park	2	6	6
7	(United States) A Frazier	6	6
(Netherlands) S Rottier	0	2
(Japan) Y Kamio	6	3	6
(Japan) N Miyagi	2	6	4
Q	(Japan) N Kijimuta	6	6
(Belgium) D Monami	3	2

Second round
(South Africa) A Coetzer	1	6	6
(Chinese Taipei) S-t Wang	6	4	2
(South Korea) S-h Park	6	2	6
3	(Japan) K Date	4	6	3
7	(United States) A Frazier	6	6
(Japan) Y Kamio	4	4
Q	(Japan) N Kijimuta	1	5
2	(France) M Pierce	6	7

Quarterfinals
(South Africa) A Coetzer	6	2
(South Korea) S-h Park	3	1^{r}
7	(United States) A Frazier	3	6	3
2	(France) M Pierce	6	3	6

Semifinals
(South Africa) A Coetzer	0	2
2	(France) M Pierce	6	6
