= 1995 Nichirei International Championships – Doubles =

Doubles
- 1995 Nichirei International Championships

Final
- Champions: (United States) Lindsay Davenport (United States) Mary Joe Fernández
- Runners-up: (South Africa) Amanda Coetzer (United States) Linda Wild
- Score: 6–3, 6–2

Details
- Draw: 16 (1WC/1Q)
- Seeds: 4

Events
| Singles | Doubles |
| ← 1994 · | Nichirei International Championships | · 1996 → |

Julie Halard and Arantxa Sánchez Vicario were the defending champions, but none competed this year. Sánchez Vicario opted to focus on the singles tournament, finishing as runner-up.

Lindsay Davenport and Mary Joe Fernández won the title by defeating Amanda Coetzer and Linda Wild 6–3, 6–2 in the final.

== Seeds ==
1. (United States) Lindsay Davenport / (United States) Mary Joe Fernández (champions)
2. (South Africa) Amanda Coetzer / (United States) Linda Wild (final)
3. (Japan) Nana Miyagi / (Japan) Ai Sugiyama (quarterfinals)
4. (United States) Amy Frazier / (United States) Kimberly Po (first round)

== Draw ==
=== Key ===
- Q = Qualifier
- WC = Wild card
- LL = Lucky loser
- Alt = Alternate
- SE = Special exempt
- PR = Protected ranking
- ITF = ITF entry
- JE = Junior exempt
- w/o = Walkover
- r = Retired
- d = Defaulted
- SR = Special ranking

=== Draw ===
First round
1 | (United States) L Davenport (United States) MJ Fernández | 6 | 6
Q | (Japan) H Mochizuki (Japan) Y Yoshida | 4 | 2
(South Africa) L Horn (Belgium) D Monami | 7^{7} | 6
(Australia) KA Guse (Australia) K Radford | 6^{3} | 3
4 | (United States) A Frazier (United States) K Po | 2 | 3
(France) M Pierce (Argentina) G Sabatini | 6 | 6
WC | (Japan) M Endo (Japan) N Sawamatsu | 6 | 3 | 6
(United States) S Stafford (United States) M Werdel-Witmeyer | 4 | 6 | 4
(Japan) R Hiraki (South Korea) S-h Park | 4 | 6 | 6
(United Kingdom) V Lake (Australia) L Pleming | 6 | 0 | 3
(France) L Ghirardi-Rubbi (Japan) H Nagano | 1 | 2
3 | (Japan) N Miyagi (Japan) A Sugiyama | 6 | 6
(Germany) C Porwik (Australia) D Scott | 6 | 3 | 4
(Australia) K Godridge (United States) L Poruri | 1 | 6 | 6
(Japan) Y Kamio (Japan) N Kijimuta | 4 | 6^{3}
2 | (South Africa) A Coetzer (United States) L Wild | 6 | 7^{7}

Quarterfinals
1 | (United States) L Davenport (United States) MJ Fernández | 6 | 6
(South Africa) L Horn (Belgium) D Monami | 1 | 4
(France) M Pierce (Argentina) G Sabatini | 7^{7} | 6
WC | (Japan) M Endo (Japan) N Sawamatsu | 6^{4} | 4
(Japan) R Hiraki (South Korea) S-h Park | 6 | 6
3 | (Japan) N Miyagi (Japan) A Sugiyama | 2 | 4
(Australia) K Godridge (United States) L Poruri | 0 | 4
2 | (South Africa) A Coetzer (United States) L Wild | 6 | 6

Semifinals
1 | (United States) L Davenport (United States) MJ Fernández | 7 | 7
(France) M Pierce (Argentina) G Sabatini | 5 | 5
(Japan) R Hiraki (South Korea) S-h Park | 3 | 6 | 5
2 | (South Africa) A Coetzer (United States) L Wild | 6 | 4 | 7

Final
1 | (United States) L Davenport (United States) MJ Fernández | 6 | 6
2 | (South Africa) A Coetzer (United States) L Wild | 3 | 2
