= 1996 Toshiba Classic =

- Date: August 19–25
- Edition: 18th
- Category: Tier II
- Draw: 28S / 16D
- Prize money: $450,000
- Surface: Hard / outdoor
- Location: San Diego, California, U.S.
- Venue: La Costa Resort and Spa

Champions

Singles
- (Japan) Kimiko Date

Doubles
- (United States) Gigi Fernández / (Spain) Conchita Martínez
- Southern California Open

The 1996 Toshiba Classic was a women's tennis tournament played on outdoor hard courts at the La Costa Resort and Spa in San Diego, California, United States that was part of Tier II of the 1996 WTA Tour. The tournament was held from August 19 through August 25, 1996. Fourth-seeded Kimiko Date won the singles title.

== Finals ==
=== Singles ===
(Japan) Kimiko Date defeated (Spain) Arantxa Sánchez Vicario 3–6, 6–3, 6–0

- It was Date's 3rd title of the year and the 8th of her career.

=== Doubles ===
(United States) Gigi Fernández / (Spain) Conchita Martínez defeated (Latvia) Larisa Savchenko / (Spain) Arantxa Sánchez Vicario 4–6, 6–3, 6–4

- It was Fernández's 3rd title of the year and the 66th of her career. It was Martínez's 2nd title of the year and the 32nd of her career.
