= 1996 Pupp Czech Open =

- Date: 10–15 September
- Edition: 1
- Category: Tier IV
- Draw: 32S / 16D
- Prize money: $160,000
- Surface: Clay / outdoor
- Location: Karlovy Vary, Czech Republic

Champions

Singles
- (Romania) Ruxandra Dragomir

Doubles
- (Slovakia) Karina Habšudová / (Czech Republic) Helena Suková
- 1996 Pupp Czech Open

The 1996 Pupp Czech Open, also known as the WTA Karlovy Vary, was a women's tennis tournament played on outdoor clay courts in Karlovy Vary in the Czech Republic that was part of Tier IV of the 1996 WTA Tour. It was the only edition of the tournament and was held from 10 September until 15 September 1996. Fifth-seeded Ruxandra Dragomir won the singles title.

== Finals ==
=== Singles ===
(Romania) Ruxandra Dragomir defeated (Switzerland) Patty Schnyder 6–2, 3–6, 6–4

- It was Dragomir's 2nd title of the year and the 4th of her career.

=== Doubles ===
(Slovakia) Karina Habšudová / (Czech Republic) Helena Suková defeated (Czech Republic) Eva Martincová / (Bulgaria) Elena Pampoulova 3–6, 6–3, 6–2

- It was Habšudová's only title of the year and the 1st of her career. It was Suková's 3rd title of the year and the 75th of her career.
