= 1997 WTA German Open – Doubles =

Doubles
- 1997 WTA German Open

Final
- Champions: (United States) Lindsay Davenport (Czech Republic) Jana Novotná
- Runners-up: (United States) Gigi Fernández (Belarus) Natasha Zvereva
- Score: 6–2, 3–6, 6–2

Details
- Draw: 28
- Seeds: 8

Events
Singles	Doubles
← 1996 ·	WTA German Open	· 1998 →

Meredith McGrath and Larisa Savchenko were the defending champions but only Savchenko competed that year with Katrina Adams.

Adams and Savchenko lost in the semifinals to Gigi Fernández and Natasha Zvereva.

Lindsay Davenport and Jana Novotná won in the final 6–2, 3–6, 6–2 against Fernández and Zvereva.

== Seeds ==
Champion seeds are indicated in bold text while text in italics indicates the round in which those seeds were eliminated. The top four seeded teams received byes into the second round.

1. (United States) Gigi Fernández / (Belarus) Natasha Zvereva (final)
2. (United States) **Lindsay Davenport** / (Czech Republic) **Jana Novotná (champions)**
3. (United States) Mary Joe Fernández / (Spain) Arantxa Sánchez Vicario (semifinals)
4. (United States) Katrina Adams / (Latvia) Larisa Savchenko (semifinals)
5. (Indonesia) Yayuk Basuki / (Netherlands) Caroline Vis (quarterfinals)
6. (France) Alexandra Fusai / (France) Nathalie Tauziat (second round)
7. (Netherlands) Manon Bollegraf / (Argentina) Patricia Tarabini (quarterfinals)
8. (Romania) Ruxandra Dragomir / (Croatia) Iva Majoli (first round)

== Draw ==
=== Key ===
- Q = Qualifier
- WC = Wild card
- LL = Lucky loser
- Alt = Alternate
- ITF = ITF entry
- PR = Protected ranking
- SR = Special ranking
- SE = Special exempt
- JE = Junior exempt
- JR = Junior Accelerator Programme entrant
- CO = College Accelerator Programme entrant
- NG = Next Gen Accelerator Program entrant
- w/o = Walkover
- r = Retired
- d = Defaulted

=== Finals ===
Final
1	(United States) Gigi Fernández (Belarus) Natasha Zvereva	2	**6**	2
2	(United States) **Lindsay Davenport** (Czech Republic) **Jana Novotná**	**6**	3	**6**

=== Top half ===
First round
(South Africa) **A Coetzer** (United States) **C Rubin**	**6**	**6**
(Belgium) E Callens (Belgium) L Courtois	1	2
(Germany) M Babel (Slovakia) K Habšudová	6	2
(Russia) **A Kournikova** (Russia) **E Likhovtseva**	**7**	**6**
Q	(Argentina) M-J Gaidano (Russia) T Panova	2	3
6	(France) **A Fusai** (France) **N Tauziat**	**6**	**6**
WC	(Argentina) I Gorrochategui (Germany) S Graf	4	**6**	3
(Japan) **R Hiraki** (Argentina) **F Labat**	**6**	3	**6**
(Belgium) **S Appelmans** (Japan) **A Sugiyama**	**6**	**7**
(Argentina) M Paz (Canada) R Simpson	4	5
(France) A-G Sidot (Argentina) P Suárez	4	2
7	(Netherlands) **M Bollegraf** (Argentina) **P Tarabini**	**6**	**6**

Second round
1	(United States) **G Fernández** (Belarus) **N Zvereva**	**6**	**6**
(South Africa) A Coetzer (United States) C Rubin	2	3
(Russia) **A Kournikova** (Russia) **E Likhovtseva**	**6**	**7**
6	(France) A Fusai (France) N Tauziat	4	6
4	(United States) **K Adams** (Latvia) **L Savchenko**	**6**	**6**
(Japan) R Hiraki (Argentina) F Labat	1	2
(Belgium) S Appelmans (Japan) A Sugiyama	4	3
7	(Netherlands) **M Bollegraf** (Argentina) **P Tarabini**	**6**	**6**

Quarterfinals
1	(United States) **G Fernández** (Belarus) **N Zvereva**	**6**	**7**
(Russia) A Kournikova (Russia) E Likhovtseva	2	5
4	(United States) **K Adams** (Latvia) **L Savchenko**	**7**	**7**
7	(Netherlands) M Bollegraf (Argentina) P Tarabini	6	6

Semifinals
1	(United States) **G Fernández** (Belarus) **N Zvereva**	**w/o**
4	(United States) K Adams (Latvia) L Savchenko

=== Bottom half ===
First round
5	(Indonesia) **Y Basuki** (Netherlands) **C Vis**	**6**	**6**
(Germany) S Meier (Italy) F Perfetti	0	0
(Czech Republic) E Martincová (Australia) R McQuillan	6	2
(Argentina) **L Montalvo** (Slovakia) **H Nagyová**	**7**	**6**
WC	(Germany) B Rittner (Germany) J Wöhr	5	0
(Italy) **L Golarsa** (Romania) **I Spîrlea**	**7**	**6**
8	(Romania) R Dragomir (Croatia) I Majoli	2	**6**	4
(Ukraine) **O Lugina** (Germany) **E Wagner**	**6**	3	**6**
(Canada) **P Hy-Boulais** (Chinese Taipei) **S-T Wang**	**6**	**6**
(Czech Republic) L Němečková (Poland) A Olsza	2	2
(Austria) B Schett (Switzerland) P Schnyder	4	2
(Czech Republic) **R Bobková** (Czech Republic) **E Melicharová**	**6**	**6**

Second round
5	(Indonesia) **Y Basuki** (Netherlands) **C Vis**	**6**	3	**6**
(Argentina) L Montalvo (Slovakia) H Nagyová	4	**6**	1
(Italy) L Golarsa (Romania) I Spîrlea	3	3
3	(United States) **M J Fernández** (Spain) **A Sánchez Vicario**	**6**	**6**
(Ukraine) **O Lugina** (Germany) **E Wagner**	**7**	3	**6**
(Canada) P Hy-Boulais (Chinese Taipei) S-T Wang	5	**6**	4
(Czech Republic) R Bobková (Czech Republic) E Melicharová	1	2
2	(United States) **L Davenport** (Czech Republic) **J Novotná**	**6**	**6**

Quarterfinals
5	(Indonesia) Y Basuki (Netherlands) C Vis	3	5
3	(United States) **M J Fernández** (Spain) **A Sánchez Vicario**	**6**	**7**
(Ukraine) O Lugina (Germany) E Wagner	3	2
2	(United States) **L Davenport** (Czech Republic) **J Novotná**	**6**	**6**

Semifinals
3	(United States) M J Fernández (Spain) A Sánchez Vicario	5	**6**	3
2	(United States) **L Davenport** (Czech Republic) **J Novotná**	**7**	1	**6**
