= 1997 WTA German Open =

- Date: 12–18 May
- Edition: 86th
- Category: Tier I
- Draw: 56S / 28D
- Prize money: $926,250
- Surface: Clay / outdoor
- Location: Berlin, Germany
- Venue: Rot-Weiss Tennis Club

Champions

Singles
- (United States) Mary Joe Fernández

Doubles
- (United States) Lindsay Davenport / (Czech Republic) Jana Novotná
- WTA German Open

The 1997 WTA German Open was a women's tennis tournament played on outdoor clay courts at the Rot-Weiss Tennis Club in Berlin, Germany that was part of the Tier I category of the 1997 WTA Tour. It was the 86th edition of the tournament and was held from 12 May through 18 May 1997. Tenth-seeded Mary Joe Fernández won the singles title.

== Finals ==
=== Singles ===
(United States) Mary Joe Fernández defeated (France) Mary Pierce 6–4, 6–2

- It was Fernández's 1st singles title of the year and the 7th of her career.

=== Doubles ===
(United States) Lindsay Davenport / (Czech Republic) Jana Novotná defeated (United States) Gigi Fernández / (Belarus) Natasha Zvereva 6–2, 3–6, 6–2

- It was Davenport's 4th doubles title of the year and the 15th of her career. It was Novotná's 3rd doubles title of the year and the 64th of her career.
