= 1995 Nichirei International Championships =

- Date: 19–24 September
- Edition: 6th
- Category: Tier II
- Draw: 28S / 16D
- Prize money: $430,000
- Surface: Hard / outdoor
- Location: Tokyo, Japan
- Venue: Ariake Coliseum

Champions

Singles
- (France) Mary Pierce

Doubles
- (United States) Lindsay Davenport (United States) Mary Joe Fernández
← 1994 ·	Nichirei International Championships	· 1996 →

The 1995 Nichirei International Championships was a women's tennis tournament played on outdoor hard courts at the Ariake Coliseum in Tokyo, Japan that was part of Tier II of the 1995 WTA Tour. It was the sixth edition of the tournament and was held from 19 September through 24 September 1995. Second-seeded Mary Pierce won the singles title.

== Finals ==
=== Singles ===
(France) Mary Pierce defeated (Spain) Arantxa Sánchez Vicario 6–3, 6–3

- It was Pierce' 2nd singles title of the year and the 7th of her career.

=== Doubles ===
(United States) Lindsay Davenport / (United States) Mary Joe Fernández defeated (South Africa) Amanda Coetzer / (United States) Linda Wild 6–3, 6–2
