= 1996 WTA German Open =

- Date: 13–19 May
- Edition: 85th
- Category: Tier I
- Draw: 56S / 28D
- Prize money: $926,250
- Surface: Clay / outdoor
- Location: Berlin, Germany
- Venue: Rot-Weiss Tennis Club

Champions

Singles
- (Germany) Steffi Graf

Doubles
- (United States) Meredith McGrath (Latvia) Larisa Savchenko
- WTA German Open

The 1996 WTA German Open was a women's tennis tournament played on outdoor clay courts at the Rot-Weiss Tennis Club in Berlin in Germany that was part of the Tier I category of the 1996 WTA Tour. It was the 85th edition of the tournament and was held from 13 May through 19 May 1996. First-seeded Steffi Graf won the singles title.

== Finals ==
=== Singles ===
(Germany) Steffi Graf defeated (Slovakia) Karina Habšudová 4–6, 6–2, 7–5

- It was Graf's 3rd title of the year and the 109th of her career.

=== Doubles ===
(United States) Meredith McGrath / (Latvia) Larisa Savchenko defeated (Switzerland) Martina Hingis / (Czech Republic) Helena Suková 6–1, 5–7, 7–6

- It was McGrath's 3rd title of the year and the 27th of her career. It was Neiland's 2nd title of the year and the 58th of her career.
