= 1997 WTA German Open – Singles =

Singles
- 1997 WTA German Open
- 1996 Champion: (Germany) Steffi Graf

Final
- Champion: (United States) Mary Joe Fernández
- Runner-up: (France) Mary Pierce
- Score: 6–4, 6–2

Details
- Draw: 56
- Seeds: 16

Events
| Singles | Doubles |
| ← 1996 · | WTA German Open | · 1998 → |

Mary Joe Fernández defeated Mary Pierce in the final, 6–4, 6–2 to win the singles tennis title at the 1997 WTA German Open.

Steffi Graf was the defending champion, but lost in the quarterfinals to Amanda Coetzer.

== Seeds ==
A champion seed is indicated in bold text while text in italics indicates the round in which that seed was eliminated. The top eight seeds received a bye to the second round.

1. (Germany) Steffi Graf (quarterfinals)
2. (Czech Republic) Jana Novotná (semifinals)
3. (United States) Lindsay Davenport (second round)
4. (Spain) Conchita Martínez (third round)
5. (Spain) Arantxa Sánchez Vicario (third round)
6. (Croatia) Iva Majoli (quarterfinals)
7. (South Africa) Amanda Coetzer (semifinals)
8. (Romania) Irina Spîrlea (third round)
9. (Slovakia) Karina Habšudová (second round)
10. (United States) **Mary Joe Fernández (champion)**
11. (Netherlands) Brenda Schultz-McCarthy (second round)
12. (France) Mary Pierce (final)
13. (Austria) Barbara Paulus (first round)
14. (Austria) Judith Wiesner (third round)
15. (Romania) Ruxandra Dragomir (third round)
16. (Russia) Elena Likhovtseva (first round)

== Draw ==
=== Key ===
- Q = Qualifier
- WC = Wild card
- LL = Lucky loser
- Alt = Alternate
- ITF = ITF entry
- PR = Protected ranking
- SR = Special ranking
- SE = Special exempt
- JE = Junior exempt
- JR = Junior Accelerator Programme entrant
- CO = College Accelerator Programme entrant
- NG = Next Gen Accelerator Program entrant
- w/o = Walkover
- r = Retired
- d = Defaulted

=== Finals ===
Semifinals
7 | (South Africa) Amanda Coetzer | 4 | 4
12 | (France) **Mary Pierce** | **6** | **6**
10 | (United States) **Mary Joe Fernández** | **6** | **6**
2 | (Czech Republic) Jana Novotná | 3 | 1

Final
12 | (France) Mary Pierce | 4 | 2
10 | (United States) **Mary Joe Fernández** | **6** | **6**

=== Top half ===
==== Section 1 ====
First round
(Canada) P Hy-Boulais | 5 | 2
(United States) **C Rubin** | **7** | **6**
(France) **A Fusai** | **7** | **6**
(Thailand) T Tanasugarn | 5 | 3
(Belarus) N Zvereva | 6 | 2
15 | (Romania) **R Dragomir** | **7** | **6**
14 | (Austria) **J Wiesner** | **6** | **6**
(Belgium) L Courtois | 0 | 2
(France) A-G Sidot | 3 | 4
(Latvia) **L Savchenko** | **6** | **6**
Q | (South Africa) J Kruger | 1 | 4
(Slovakia) **K Studeníková** | **6** | **6**

Second round
1 | (Germany) **S Graf** | **6** | 3 | **6**
(United States) C Rubin | 3 | **6** | 1
(France) A Fusai | 2 | 2
15 | (Romania) **R Dragomir** | **6** | **6**
14 | (Austria) **J Wiesner** | **7** | **6**
(Latvia) L Savchenko | 6 | 1
(Slovakia) K Studeníková | 0 | 0
7 | (South Africa) **A Coetzer** | **6** | **6**

Third round
1 | (Germany) **S Graf** | **6** | **6**
15 | (Romania) R Dragomir | 3 | 2
14 | (Austria) J Wiesner | 1 | 1
7 | (South Africa) **A Coetzer** | **6** | **6**

Quarterfinals
1 | (Germany) S Graf | 0 | 1
7 | (South Africa) **A Coetzer** | **6** | **6**

==== Section 2 ====
First round
(Chinese Taipei) S-T Wang | 4 | 3
(Indonesia) **Y Basuki** | **6** | **6**
(Germany) J Kandarr | 4 | 2
(Czech Republic) **S Kleinová** | **6** | **6**
WC | (Germany) E Wagner | 2 | 3
12 | (France) **M Pierce** | **6** | **6**
9 | (Slovakia) **K Habšudová** | **7** | **6**
WC | (Germany) S Klösel | 5 | 3
(Italy) **G Pizzichini** | **7** | 4 | **6**
(Argentina) P Suárez | 6 | **6** | 1
Q | (Argentina) **I Gorrochategui** | **6** | **6**
Q | (Germany) W Probst | 4 | 3

Second round
4 | (Spain) **C Martínez** | **6** | 5 | **6**
(Indonesia) Y Basuki | 3 | **7** | 3
(Czech Republic) S Kleinová | 3 | **6** | 2
12 | (France) **M Pierce** | **6** | 2 | **6**
9 | (Slovakia) K Habšudová | 4 | 2 | r
(Italy) **G Pizzichini** | **6** | **4**
Q | (Argentina) I Gorrochategui | 3 | 5
6 | (Croatia) **I Majoli** | **6** | **7**

Third round
4 | (Spain) C Martínez | 2 | 0
12 | (France) **M Pierce** | **6** | **6**
(Italy) G Pizzichini | 4 | 2
6 | (Croatia) **I Majoli** | **6** | **6**

Quarterfinals
12 | (France) **M Pierce** | **6** | **6**
6 | (Croatia) I Majoli | 1 | 4

=== Bottom half ===
==== Section 3 ====
First round
(Austria) **B Schett** | **6** | **6**
(Argentina) F Labat | 1 | 0
(Russia) **A Kournikova** | **6** | **6**
Q | (Austria) S Plischke | 2 | 2
(Czech Republic) **A Gerši** | **7** | 6 | **6**
13 | (Austria) B Paulus | 5 | **7** | 4
10 | (United States) **M J Fernández** | **6** | 3 | **6**
(Italy) F Perfetti | 4 | **6** | 1
Q | (Spain) **M Sánchez Lorenzo** | **6** | 4 | **6**
(Slovakia) H Nagyová | 2 | **6** | 3
(France) **S Testud** | **6** | **6**
(Japan) A Sugiyama | 2 | 1

Second round
5 | (Spain) **A Sánchez Vicario** | **6** | 4 | **7**
(Austria) B Schett | 2 | **6** | 5
(Russia) **A Kournikova** | **6** | **6**
(Czech Republic) A Gerši | 0 | 3
10 | (United States) **M J Fernández** | **6** | 1 | **6**
Q | (Spain) M Sánchez Lorenzo | 4 | **6** | 3
(France) **S Testud** | **7** | **7**
3 | (United States) L Davenport | 6 | 6

Third round
5 | (Spain) A Sánchez Vicario | **6** | 0 | 3
(Russia) **A Kournikova** | 3 | **6** | **6**
10 | (United States) **M J Fernández** | **6** | **6**
(France) S Testud | 2 | 2

Quarterfinals
(Russia) A Kournikova | 1 | 4
10 | (United States) **M J Fernández** | **6** | **6**

==== Section 4 ====
First round
LL | (Spain) M Serna | 2 | 6
Q | (Russia) **T Panova** | **6** | **7**
(Belgium) **S Appelmans** | **6** | **7**
Q | (Russia) E Makarova | 2 | 6
(Switzerland) P Schnyder | 1 | 4
11 | (Netherlands) **B Schultz-McCarthy** | **6** | **6**
16 | (Russia) E Likhovtseva | 1 | 4
Q | (Czech Republic) **E Martincová** | **6** | **6**
(France) **N Tauziat** | 6 | **6** | **6**
WC | (Germany) A Glass | **7** | 1 | 1
(Germany) **B Rittner** | **6** | **6**
(Belgium) E Callens | 1 | 0

Second round
8 | (Romania) **I Spîrlea** | **7** | **6**
Q | (Russia) T Panova | 6 | 1
(Belgium) **S Appelmans** | **1**
11 | (Netherlands) B Schultz-McCarthy | 0 | r
Q | (Czech Republic) E Martincová | 4 | 4
(France) **N Tauziat** | **6** | **6**
(Germany) B Rittner | 4 | **6** | 5
2 | (Czech Republic) **J Novotná** | **6** | 2 | **7**

Third round
8 | (Romania) I Spîrlea | 6 | **6** | 3
(Belgium) **S Appelmans** | **7** | 2 | **6**
(France) N Tauziat | 0 | 2
2 | (Czech Republic) **J Novotná** | **6** | **6**

Quarterfinals
(Belgium) S Appelmans | **6** | 2 | 0
2 | (Czech Republic) **J Novotná** | 1 | **6** | **6**
