= 1996 Nichirei International Championships – Singles =

Singles
- 1996 Nichirei International Championships
- 1995 Champion: (France) Mary Pierce

Final
- Champion: (United States) Monica Seles
- Runner-up: (Spain) Arantxa Sánchez Vicario
- Score: 6–1, 6–4

Events
Singles	Doubles
← 1995 ·	Nichirei International Championships	· 1997 →

Mary Pierce was the defending champion but lost in the quarterfinals to Kimberly Po.

Monica Seles won in the final 6–1, 6–4 against Arantxa Sánchez Vicario.

== Seeds ==
A champion seed is indicated in bold text while text in italics indicates the round in which that seed was eliminated. The top four seeds received a bye to the second round.

1. (United States) **Monica Seles (champion)**
2. (Spain) Arantxa Sánchez Vicario (final)
3. (Japan) Kimiko Date (semifinals)
4. (France) Mary Pierce (quarterfinals)
5. (South Africa) Amanda Coetzer (quarterfinals)
6. (Japan) Ai Sugiyama (second round)
7. (Japan) Naoko Sawamatsu (quarterfinals)
8. (Chinese Taipei) Shi-Ting Wang (quarterfinals)

== Draw ==
=== Key ===
- Q = Qualifier
- WC = Wild card
- LL = Lucky loser
- Alt = Alternate
- SE = Special exempt
- PR = Protected ranking
- ITF = ITF entry
- JE = Junior exempt
- w/o = Walkover
- r = Retired
- d = Defaulted
- SR = Special ranking

=== Final ===
Final
1	(United States) **Monica Seles**	**6**	**6**
2	(Spain) Arantxa Sánchez Vicario	1	4

=== Section 1 ===
First round
(Japan) **M Endo**	**6**	**6**
(Japan) Y Kamio	1	4
WC	(Japan) **Y Yoshida**	2	**6**	**6**
Q	(Czech Republic) L Varmužová	**6**	3	4
(United States) A Grossman	1	3
7	(Japan) **N Sawamatsu**	**6**	**6**
(Japan) **N Miyagi**	**7**	**7**
Q	(Japan) H Inoue	6	6
(United States) J Watanabe	1	2
(Japan) **N Kijimuta**	**6**	**6**
Q	(Australia) K-A Guse	1	2
5	(South Africa) **A Coetzer**	**6**	**6**

Second round
1	(United States) **M Seles**	**6**	**6**
(Japan) M Endo	4	4
WC	(Japan) Y Yoshida	2	1
7	(Japan) **N Sawamatsu**	**6**	**6**
3	(Japan) **K Date**	4	**6**	**6**
(Japan) N Miyagi	**6**	4	3
(Japan) N Kijimuta	6	2
5	(South Africa) **A Coetzer**	**7**	**6**

Quarterfinals
1	(United States) **M Seles**	**6**	**6**
7	(Japan) N Sawamatsu	1	4
3	(Japan) **K Date**	**6**	**6**
5	(South Africa) A Coetzer	3	0

Semifinals
1	(United States) **M Seles**	**6**	1	**7**
3	(Japan) K Date	4	**6**	6

=== Section 2 ===
First round
6	(Japan) **A Sugiyama**	**6**	**6**
(Czech Republic) A Gerši	1	4
WC	(Japan) M Saeki	2	1
(United States) **K Po**	**6**	**6**
(South Korea) **S-H Park**	**7**	**6**
Q	(Thailand) T Tanasugarn	6	2
8	(Chinese Taipei) **S-T Wang**	**6**	**6**
(Japan) R Hiraki	1	3
(Germany) **A Glass**	**6**	**6**
(Australia) A Ellwood	4	4
(Japan) K Nagatsuka	4	**6**	2
(Italy) **R Grande**	**6**	2	**6**

Second round
6	(Japan) A Sugiyama	2	**7**	4
(United States) **K Po**	**6**	6	**6**
(South Korea) S-H Park	5	2
4	(France) **M Pierce**	**7**	**6**
8	(Chinese Taipei) **S-T Wang**	**6**	**7**
(Germany) A Glass	1	5
(Italy) R Grande	2	1
2	(Spain) **A Sánchez Vicario**	**6**	**6**

Quarterfinals
(United States) **K Po**	**7**	**6**
4	(France) M Pierce	5	4
8	(Chinese Taipei) S-T Wang	**6**	1	1
2	(Spain) **A Sánchez Vicario**	4	**6**	**6**

Semifinals
(United States) K Po	4	3
2	(Spain) **A Sánchez Vicario**	**6**	**6**
