= 1996 Nichirei International Championships – Doubles =

Doubles
- 1996 Nichirei International Championships
- 1995 Champions: (United States) Lindsay Davenport (United States) Mary Joe Fernández

Final
- Champions: (South Africa) Amanda Coetzer (France) Mary Pierce
- Runners-up: (South Korea) Sung-Hee Park (Chinese Taipei) Shi-Ting Wang
- Score: 6–3, 7–6

Events
Singles	Doubles
← 1995 ·	Nichirei International Championships	· 1997 →

Lindsay Davenport and Mary Joe Fernández were the defending champions but did not compete that year.

Amanda Coetzer and Mary Pierce won in the final 6–3, 7–6 against Sung-Hee Park and Shi-Ting Wang.

== Seeds ==
Champion seeds are indicated in bold text while text in italics indicates the round in which those seeds were eliminated. The top two seeded teams received byes into the quarterfinals.

1. (Japan) Rika Hiraki / (Japan) Nana Miyagi (semifinals)
2. (Italy) Rita Grande / (United States) Kimberly Po (semifinals)
3. (South Korea) Sung-Hee Park / (Chinese Taipei) Shi-Ting Wang (final)
4. (Australia) Annabel Ellwood / (Australia) Kerry-Anne Guse (first round)

== Draw ==
=== Key ===
- Q = Qualifier
- WC = Wild card
- LL = Lucky loser
- Alt = Alternate
- SE = Special exempt
- PR = Protected ranking
- ITF = ITF entry
- JE = Junior exempt
- w/o = Walkover
- r = Retired
- d = Defaulted
- SR = Special ranking

First round
(Japan) **M Endo** (Japan) **N Sawamatsu**	5	**6**	**6**
(Germany) A Glass (United States) A Grossman	**7**	3	3
4	(Australia) A Ellwood (Australia) K-A Guse	3	1
(South Africa) **A Coetzer** (France) **M Pierce**	**6**	**6**
(Spain) **A Sánchez Vicario** (United States) **M Seles**	**6**	**6**
(Thailand) T Tanasugarn (United States) J Watanabe	3	0
(Japan) **M Saeki** (Japan) **Y Yoshida**	**6**	**6**
(Czech Republic) A Gerši (Czech Republic) L Varmužová	2	2
WC	(Japan) S Obata (Japan) N Urabe	3	6
3	(South Korea) **S-H Park** (Chinese Taipei) **S-T Wang**	**6**	**7**
(Japan) **K Date** (Japan) **A Sugiyama**	**6**	**6**
(Japan) K Kuki (Japan) M Kuki	4	0

Quarterfinals
1	(Japan) **R Hiraki** (Japan) **N Miyagi**	**7**	**7**
(Japan) M Endo (Japan) N Sawamatsu	5	5
(South Africa) **A Coetzer** (France) **M Pierce**	**6**	4	**6**
(Spain) A Sánchez Vicario (United States) M Seles	4	**6**	4
(Japan) M Saeki (Japan) Y Yoshida	**6**	3	1
3	(South Korea) **S-H Park** (Chinese Taipei) **S-T Wang**	2	**6**	**6**
(Japan) K Date (Japan) A Sugiyama	5	**6**	2
2	(Italy) **R Grande** (United States) **K Po**	**7**	0	**6**

Semifinals
1	(Japan) R Hiraki (Japan) N Miyagi	3	1
(South Africa) **A Coetzer** (France) **M Pierce**	**6**	**6**
3	(South Korea) **S-H Park** (Chinese Taipei) **S-T Wang**	**7**	**6**
2	(Italy) R Grande (United States) K Po	6	3

Final
(South Africa) **Amanda Coetzer** (France) **Mary Pierce**	**6**	**7**
3	(South Korea) Sung-Hee Park (Chinese Taipei) Shi-Ting Wang	3	6
