= 1996 WTA German Open – Doubles =

Doubles
- 1996 WTA German Open

Final
- Champions: (United States) Meredith McGrath (Latvia) Larisa Neiland
- Runners-up: (Switzerland) Martina Hingis (Czech Republic) Helena Suková
- Score: 6–1, 5–7, 7–6

Details
- Draw: 28
- Seeds: 8

Events
Singles	Doubles
← 1995 ·	WTA German Open	· 1997 →

Amanda Coetzer and Inés Gorrochategui were the defending champions but only Coetzer competed that year with Lori McNeil.

Coetzer and McNeil lost in the semifinals to Meredith McGrath and Larisa Neiland.

McGrath and Neiland won in the final 6–1, 5–7, 7–6 against Martina Hingis and Helena Suková.

== Seeds ==
Champion seeds are indicated in bold text while text in italics indicates the round in which those seeds were eliminated. The top four seeded teams received byes into the second round.

1. (United States) **Meredith McGrath** / (Latvia) **Larisa Neiland (champions)**
2. (United States) Nicole Arendt / (Netherlands) Manon Bollegraf (second round)
3. (France) Julie Halard-Decugis / (France) Nathalie Tauziat (quarterfinals)
4. (South Africa) Amanda Coetzer / (United States) Lori McNeil (semifinals)
5. (Netherlands) Kristie Boogert / (Australia) Nicole Bradtke (quarterfinals)
6. (Switzerland) Martina Hingis / (Czech Republic) Helena Suková (final)
7. (Indonesia) Yayuk Basuki / (Netherlands) Caroline Vis (quarterfinals)
8. (Italy) Laura Garrone / (Argentina) Patricia Tarabini (second round)

== Draw ==
=== Key ===
- Q = Qualifier
- WC = Wild card
- LL = Lucky loser
- Alt = Alternate
- ITF = ITF entry
- PR = Protected ranking
- SR = Special ranking
- SE = Special exempt
- JE = Junior exempt
- JR = Junior Accelerator Programme entrant
- CO = College Accelerator Programme entrant
- NG = Next Gen Accelerator Program entrant
- w/o = Walkover
- r = Retired
- d = Defaulted

=== Finals ===
Final
1	(United States) **Meredith McGrath** (Latvia) **Larisa Neiland**	**6**	5	**7**
6	(Switzerland) Martina Hingis (Czech Republic) Helena Suková	1	**7**	6

=== Top half ===
First round
(Romania) **R Dragomir** (United States) **A Grossman**	**6**	**6**
(Federal Republic of Yugoslavia) T Ječmenica (Bulgaria) S Krivencheva	2	3
(Czech Republic) P Langrová (Slovakia) R Zrubáková	2	3
Q	(Spain) **Á Montolio** (Spain) **V Ruano-Pascual**	**6**	**6**
(Italy) R Grande (Russia) E Likhovtseva	6	**7**	5
7	(Indonesia) **Y Basuki** (Netherlands) **C Vis**	**7**	5	**7**
(Sweden) **Å Carlsson** (Hungary) **A Temesvári**	**7**	**6**
(Ukraine) O Lugina (Czech Republic) H Vildová	6	2
WC	(Germany) P Begerow (Germany) M Weingärtner	2	2
(Czech Republic) **R Bobková** (United States) **D Graham**	**6**	**6**
(Germany) S Meier (United States) J Watanabe	**7**	6	2
5	(Netherlands) **K Boogert** (Australia) **N Bradtke**	6	**7**	**6**

Second round
1	(United States) **M McGrath** (Latvia) **L Neiland**	**6**	**1**
(Romania) R Dragomir (United States) A Grossman	4	0	r
Q	(Spain) Á Montolio (Spain) V Ruano-Pascual	2	4
7	(Indonesia) **Y Basuki** (Netherlands) **C Vis**	**6**	**6**
4	(South Africa) **A Coetzer** (United States) **L McNeil**	**6**	**6**
(Sweden) Å Carlsson (Hungary) A Temesvári	2	1
(Czech Republic) R Bobková (United States) D Graham	**7**	2	2
5	(Netherlands) **K Boogert** (Australia) **N Bradtke**	5	**6**	**6**

Quarterfinals
1	(United States) **M McGrath** (Latvia) **L Neiland**	**6**	**7**
7	(Indonesia) Y Basuki (Netherlands) C Vis	4	6
4	(South Africa) **A Coetzer** (United States) **L McNeil**	**6**	**6**
5	(Netherlands) K Boogert (Australia) N Bradtke	3	2

Semifinals
1	(United States) **M McGrath** (Latvia) **L Neiland**	**6**	**6**
4	(South Africa) A Coetzer (United States) L McNeil	0	4

=== Bottom half ===
First round
6	(Switzerland) **M Hingis** (Czech Republic) **H Suková**	**6**	**6**
(United States) M Werdel-Witmeyer (United States) T Whitlinger-Jones	4	1
(Czech Republic) **E Martincová** (Czech Republic) **J Pospíšilová**	6	**6**	**6**
(France) I Demongeot (France) C Dhenin	**7**	1	4
(Germany) A Huber (Belarus) N Zvereva	3	6
(Romania) **C Cristea** (United States) **L Poruri**	**6**	**7**
8	(Italy) **L Garrone** (Argentina) **P Tarabini**	**6**	**7**
(Spain) E Bes Ostariz (Slovakia) K Habšudová	3	6
(United States) L Lee (United States) S McCarthy	**7**	1	4
WC	(Germany) **C Singer** (Germany) **B Rittner**	6	**6**	**6**
(Finland) **N Dahlman** (Australia) **R McQuillan**	**6**	**6**
(Poland) M Grzybowska (South Africa) J Kruger	3	1

Second round
6	(Switzerland) **M Hingis** (Czech Republic) **H Suková**	**6**	**6**
(Czech Republic) E Martincová (Czech Republic) J Pospíšilová	2	1
(Romania) C Cristea (United States) L Poruri	1	0
3	(France) **J Halard-Decugis** (France) **N Tauziat**	**6**	**6**
8	(Italy) L Garrone (Argentina) P Tarabini	4	6
WC	(Germany) **C Singer** (Germany) **B Rittner**	**6**	**7**
(Finland) **N Dahlman** (Australia) **R McQuillan**	**6**	**7**
2	(United States) N Arendt (Netherlands) M Bollegraf	4	6

Quarterfinals
6	(Switzerland) **M Hingis** (Czech Republic) **H Suková**	**7**	**6**
3	(France) J Halard-Decugis (France) N Tauziat	6	2
WC	(Germany) C Singer (Germany) B Rittner	**7**	4	3
(Finland) **N Dahlman** (Australia) **R McQuillan**	5	**6**	**6**

Semifinals
6	(Switzerland) **M Hingis** (Czech Republic) **H Suková**	**6**	**6**
(Finland) N Dahlman (Australia) R McQuillan	2	3
