= 1996 Pupp Czech Open – Doubles =

Doubles
- 1996 Pupp Czech Open

Final
- Champions: (Slovakia) Karina Habšudová; (Czech Republic) Helena Suková
- Runners-up: (Czech Republic) Eva Martincová; (Bulgaria) Elena Pampoulova
- Score: 3–6, 6–3, 6–2

Details
- Draw: 32
- Seeds: 8

Events
Singles	Doubles
Pupp Czech Open

Chanda Rubin and Linda Wild were the defending champions but did not compete that year.

Karina Habšudová and Helena Suková won in the final 3–6, 6–3, 6–2 against Eva Martincová and Elena Pampoulova.

== Seeds ==
Champion seeds are indicated in bold text while text in italics indicates the round in which those seeds were eliminated.

1. n/a
2. (Czech Republic) Eva Martincová / (Bulgaria) Elena Pampoulova (final)
3. (Slovakia) Denisa Krajčovičová / (Slovakia) Radka Zrubáková (first round)
4. (Germany) Wiltrud Probst / (Switzerland) Patty Schnyder (quarterfinals)
5. (Romania) Ruxandra Dragomir / (Italy) Silvia Farina (semifinals)

== Draw ==
=== Key ===
- Q = Qualifier
- WC = Wild card
- LL = Lucky loser
- Alt = Alternate
- SE = Special exempt
- PR = Protected ranking
- ITF = ITF entry
- JE = Junior exempt
- w/o = Walkover
- r = Retired
- d = Defaulted
- SR = Special ranking

First round

Quarterfinals

Semifinals

Final

5
- (Romania) **R Dragomir**
- (Italy) **S Farina**
**6**
**6**

- (Czech Republic) K Kroupová
- (Czech Republic) P Langrová
4
4

5
- (Romania) **R Dragomir**
- (Italy) **S Farina**
**6**
4
**6**

- (Czech Republic) L Cenková
- (Czech Republic) A Gerši
3
4

- (Spain) Á Montolio
- (Spain) M Sánchez Lorenzo
3
**6**
2

- (Spain) **Á Montolio**
- (Spain) **M Sánchez Lorenzo**
**6**
**6**

5
- (Romania) R Dragomir
- (Italy) S Farina
4
3

3
- (Slovakia) D Krajčovičová
- (Slovakia) R Zrubáková
4
**6**
2

WC
- (Slovakia) **K Habšudová**
- (Czech Republic) **H Suková**
**6**
**6**

WC
- (Slovakia) **K Habšudová**
- (Czech Republic) **H Suková**
**6**
3
**6**

WC
- (Slovakia) **K Habšudová**
- (Czech Republic) **H Suková**
**6**
**6**

- (Hungary) **V Csurgo**
- (Italy) **F Perfetti**
**6**
3
**6**

- (Hungary) V Csurgo
- (Italy) F Perfetti
3
3

Q
- (Czech Republic) J Schönfeldová
- (Czech Republic) A Vašková
2
**6**
4

WC
- (Slovakia) **Karina Habšudová**
- (Czech Republic) **Helena Suková**
3
**6**
**6**

Q
- (Czech Republic) O Blahotová
- (Czech Republic) J Macurová
2
4

2
- (Czech Republic) Eva Martincová
- (Bulgaria) Elena Pampoulova
**6**
3
2

- (Germany) **V Martinek**
- (Germany) **C Schneider**
**6**
**6**

- (Germany) **V Martinek**
- (Germany) **C Schneider**
**7**
2
**6**

- (Russia) T Panova
- (France) S Pitkowski
2
3

4
- (Germany) W Probst
- (Switzerland) P Schnyder
6
**6**
3

4
- (Germany) **W Probst**
- (Switzerland) **P Schnyder**
**6**
**6**

- (Germany) V Martinek
- (Germany) C Schneider
0
**6**
3

- (Georgia (country)) L Meskhi
- (Slovakia) H Nagyová
4
3

2
- (Czech Republic) **E Martincová**
- (Bulgaria) **E Pampoulova**
**6**
3
**6**

- (Slovakia) **J Husárová**
- (Slovakia) **K Studeníková**
**6**
**6**

- (Slovakia) J Husárová
- (Slovakia) K Studeníková
**6**
3
1

- (Czech Republic) R Bobková
- (Czech Republic) D Chládková
2
3

2
- (Czech Republic) **E Martincová**
- (Bulgaria) **E Pampoulova**
4
**6**
**6**

2
- (Czech Republic) **E Martincová**
- (Bulgaria) **E Pampoulova**
**6**
**6**
