= 1996 Toshiba Classic – Doubles =

Doubles
- 1996 Toshiba Classic

Final
- Champions: (United States) Gigi Fernández (Spain) Conchita Martínez
- Runners-up: (Latvia) Larisa Neiland (Spain) Arantxa Sánchez Vicario
- Score: 4–6, 6–3, 6–4

Details
- Draw: 16
- Seeds: 4

Events
Singles	Doubles
- Toshiba Classic

Gigi Fernández and Natasha Zvereva were the defending champions but only Fernández competed that year with Conchita Martínez.

Fernández and Martínez won in the final 4–6, 6–3, 6–4 against Larisa Neiland and Arantxa Sánchez Vicario.

== Seeds ==
Champion seeds are indicated in bold text while text in italics indicates the round in which those seeds were eliminated.

1. (Latvia) Larisa Neiland / (Spain) Arantxa Sánchez Vicario (final)
2. (United States) **Gigi Fernández** / (Spain) **Conchita Martínez (champions)**
3. (United States) Lisa Raymond / (Australia) Rennae Stubbs (semifinals)
4. (Australia) Elizabeth Smylie / (United States) Linda Wild (first round)

== Draw ==
Key

- Q = Qualifier
- WC = Wild card
- LL = Lucky loser
- Alt = Alternate
- ITF = ITF entry
- PR = Protected ranking
- SR = Special ranking
- SE = Special exempt
- JE = Junior exempt
- JR = Junior Accelerator Programme entrant
- CO = College Accelerator Programme entrant
- NG = Next Gen Accelerator Program entrant
- w/o = Walkover
- r = Retired
- d = Defaulted

First round
1	(Latvia) **L Neiland** (Spain) **A Sánchez Vicario**	**6**	**6**
(Sweden) Å Carlsson (Russia) E Makarova	4	1
(South Africa) **R Nideffer** (United States) **K Po**	**6**	**6**
(Canada) J Hetherington (United States) K Rinaldi-Stunkel	3	3
3	(United States) **L Raymond** (Australia) **R Stubbs**	**6**	**6**
(Austria) S Dopfer (Germany) A Glass	3	3
(Netherlands) **K Boogert** (France) **N Tauziat**	1	**6**	**6**
(Japan) R Hiraki (Japan) N Miyagi	**6**	2	3
WC	(Slovakia) K Studeníková (United States) M Werdel-Witmeyer	3	4
(United States) **K Adams** (Netherlands) **M Oremans**	**6**	**6**
(United States) **A Grossman** (United States) **S Reece**	**6**	5	**6**
4	(Australia) E Smylie (United States) L Wild	3	**7**	4
(United States) Z Garrison-Jackson (United States) P Shriver	**6**	4	6
(Argentina) **P Tarabini** (Netherlands) **C Vis**	3	**6**	**7**
(Argentina) L Montalvo (Germany) B Rittner	**7**	1	1
2	(United States) **G Fernández** (Spain) **C Martínez**	5	**6**	**6**

Quarterfinals
1	(Latvia) **L Neiland** (Spain) **A Sánchez Vicario**	**6**	**6**
(South Africa) R Nideffer (United States) K Po	3	1
3	(United States) **L Raymond** (Australia) **R Stubbs**	**6**	**7**
(Netherlands) K Boogert (France) N Tauziat	3	5
(United States) **K Adams** (Netherlands) **M Oremans**	**6**	**6**
(United States) A Grossman (United States) S Reece	1	4
(Argentina) P Tarabini (Netherlands) C Vis	5	1
2	(United States) **G Fernández** (Spain) **C Martínez**	**7**	**6**

Semifinals
1	(Latvia) **L Neiland** (Spain) **A Sánchez Vicario**	4	**6**	**6**
3	(United States) L Raymond (Australia) R Stubbs	**6**	4	4
(United States) K Adams (Netherlands) M Oremans	3	3
2	(United States) **G Fernández** (Spain) **C Martínez**	**6**	**6**

Final
1	(Latvia) Larisa Neiland (Spain) Arantxa Sánchez Vicario	**6**	3	4
2	(United States) **Gigi Fernández** (Spain) **Conchita Martínez**	4	**6**	**6**
