= 1996 Pupp Czech Open – Singles =

Singles
- 1996 Pupp Czech Open

Final
- Champion: (Romania) Ruxandra Dragomir
- Runner-up: (Switzerland) Patty Schnyder
- Score: 6–2, 3–6, 6–4

Details
- Draw: 32
- Seeds: 8

Events
Singles	Doubles
Pupp Czech Open

Julie Halard was the defending champion but did not compete that year.

Ruxandra Dragomir won in the final 6–2, 3–6, 6–4 against Patty Schnyder.

== Seeds ==
A champion seed is indicated in bold text while text in italics indicates the round in which that seed was eliminated.

1. (Austria) Barbara Paulus (second round)
2. (Slovakia) Karina Habšudová (second round)
3. (Czech Republic) Helena Suková (first round)
4. (Slovakia) Katarína Studeníková (semifinals)
5. (Romania) **Ruxandra Dragomir (champion)**
6. n/a
7. (Germany) Sabine Hack (second round)
8. (Italy) Silvia Farina (first round)
9. (Slovakia) Henrieta Nagyová (quarterfinals)

== Draw ==
=== Key ===
- Q = Qualifier
- WC = Wild card
- LL = Lucky loser
- Alt = Alternate
- SE = Special exempt
- PR = Protected ranking
- ITF = ITF entry
- JE = Junior exempt
- w/o = Walkover
- r = Retired
- d = Defaulted
- SR = Special ranking

First round
1	(Austria) **B Paulus**	**6**	**6**
(Bulgaria) K Maleeva	4	3
(Switzerland) **P Schnyder**	**6**	4	**6**
(Spain) M Sánchez Lorenzo	3	**6**	1
Q	(Argentina) M Díaz Oliva	**6**	4	4
(Czech Republic) **R Bobková**	4	**6**	**6**
(Italy) **F Perfetti**	**6**	**6**
8	(Italy) S Farina	4	1
3	(Czech Republic) H Suková	3	3
(Slovakia) **J Husárová**	**6**	**6**
(Georgia (country)) L Meskhi	1	0
WC	(Czech Republic) **L Cenková**	**6**	**6**
(Poland) **K Nowak**	**6**	2	**6**
LL	(Germany) V Martinek	2	**6**	3
(Spain) C Torrens Valero	**6**	5	4
9	(Slovakia) **H Nagyová**	4	**7**	**6**
7	(Germany) **S Hack**	**6**	**6**
Q	(Czech Republic) K Kroupová	3	3
Q	(Monaco) **E Gagliardi**	6	**6**	**7**
(Czech Republic) S Kleinová	**7**	1	6
(Austria) **S Dopfer**	**6**	**6**
(Czech Republic) P Langrová	2	4
(Bulgaria) E Pampoulova	2	3
4	(Slovakia) **K Studeníková**	**6**	**6**
5	(Romania) **R Dragomir**	6	**6**	**6**
(France) S Pitkowski	**7**	4	3
WC	(Czech Republic) **D Chládková**	**6**	**1**
(Italy) S Cecchini	3	0	r
Q	(Argentina) B Fulco-Villella	1	3
(Croatia) **S Talaja**	**6**	**6**
(Germany) A Glass	4	6
2	(Slovakia) **K Habšudová**	**6**	**7**

Second round
1	(Austria) B Paulus	**6**	6	4
(Switzerland) **P Schnyder**	3	**7**	**6**
(Czech Republic) R Bobková	1	0
(Italy) **F Perfetti**	**6**	**6**
(Slovakia) J Husárová	5	1
WC	(Czech Republic) **L Cenková**	**7**	**6**
(Poland) K Nowak	1	4
9	(Slovakia) **H Nagyová**	**6**	**6**
7	(Germany) S Hack	4	6
Q	(Monaco) **E Gagliardi**	**6**	**7**
(Austria) S Dopfer	2	1
4	(Slovakia) **K Studeníková**	**6**	**6**
5	(Romania) **R Dragomir**	**7**	**6**
WC	(Czech Republic) D Chládková	5	0
(Croatia) **S Talaja**	**6**	**6**
2	(Slovakia) K Habšudová	3	0

Quarterfinals
(Switzerland) **P Schnyder**	**7**	**6**
(Italy) F Perfetti	6	2
WC	(Czech Republic) **L Cenková**	**6**	**6**
9	(Slovakia) H Nagyová	2	0
Q	(Monaco) E Gagliardi	0	**7**	4
4	(Slovakia) **K Studeníková**	**6**	6	**6**
5	(Romania) **R Dragomir**	**6**	**7**
(Croatia) S Talaja	2	6

Semifinals
(Switzerland) **P Schnyder**	5	**7**	**7**
WC	(Czech Republic) L Cenková	**7**	6	6
4	(Slovakia) K Studeníková	**6**	2	3
5	(Romania) **R Dragomir**	4	**6**	**6**

Final
(Switzerland) Patty Schnyder	2	**6**	4
5	(Romania) **Ruxandra Dragomir**	**6**	3	**6**
