= 1996 Toshiba Classic – Singles =

Singles
- 1996 Toshiba Classic

Final
- Champion: (Japan) Kimiko Date
- Runner-up: (Spain) Arantxa Sánchez Vicario
- Score: 3–6, 6–3, 6–0

Details
- Draw: 28
- Seeds: 8

Events
Singles	Doubles
- Toshiba Classic

Conchita Martínez was the defending champion but lost in the semifinals to Kimiko Date.

Date won in the final 3–6, 6–3, 6–0 against Arantxa Sánchez Vicario.

== Seeds ==
A champion seed is indicated in bold text while text in italics indicates the round in which that seed was eliminated. The top four seeds received a bye to the second round.

1. (Spain) Arantxa Sánchez Vicario (final)
2. (Spain) Conchita Martínez (semifinals)
3. (Czech Republic) Jana Novotná (semifinals)
4. (Japan) **Kimiko Date (champion)**
5. (Argentina) Gabriela Sabatini (quarterfinals)
6. (Slovakia) Karina Habšudová (second round)
7. (Japan) Ai Sugiyama (second round)
8. (France) Nathalie Tauziat (quarterfinals)

== Draw ==
Key

- Q = Qualifier
- WC = Wild card
- LL = Lucky loser
- Alt = Alternate
- ITF = ITF entry
- PR = Protected ranking
- SR = Special ranking
- SE = Special exempt
- JE = Junior exempt
- JR = Junior Accelerator Programme entrant
- CO = College Accelerator Programme entrant
- NG = Next Gen Accelerator Program entrant
- w/o = Walkover
- r = Retired
- d = Defaulted

=== Final ===
Final
1	(Spain) Arantxa Sánchez Vicario	**6**	3	0
4	(Japan) **Kimiko Date**	3	**6**	**6**

=== Section 1 ===
First round
Q	(Japan) **N Kijimuta**	**6**	**6**
(United States) G Fernández	2	1
Q	(United States) V Williams	4	**6**	5
(Slovakia) **K Studeníková**	**6**	3	**7**
WC	(United States) P Shriver	**7**	3	4
6	(Slovakia) **K Habšudová**	5	**6**	**6**
(United States) **L Wild**	**6**	**7**
(United States) Z Garrison-Jackson	3	6
(France) **S Testud**	**6**	**6**
Q	(Australia) R Stubbs	4	1
WC	(Mexico) A Gavaldón	1	2
7	(Japan) **A Sugiyama**	**6**	**6**

Second round
1	(Spain) **A Sánchez Vicario**	1	**6**	**6**
Q	(Japan) N Kijimuta	**6**	4	3
(Slovakia) **K Studeníková**	**7**	**6**
6	(Slovakia) K Habšudová	6	2
3	(Czech Republic) **J Novotná**	**7**	**7**
(United States) L Wild	6	6
(France) **S Testud**	**6**	4	**6**
7	(Japan) A Sugiyama	3	**6**	4

Quarterfinals
1	(Spain) **A Sánchez Vicario**	**6**	**6**
(Slovakia) K Studeníková	3	3
3	(Czech Republic) **J Novotná**	2	**7**	**6**
(France) S Testud	**6**	6	3

Semifinals
1	(Spain) **A Sánchez Vicario**	1	**6**	**6**
3	(Czech Republic) J Novotná	**6**	2	3

=== Section 2 ===
First round
5	(Argentina) **G Sabatini**	**6**	**6**
(United States) L Lee	0	0
(United States) L Raymond	4	0
(Sweden) **Å Carlsson**	**6**	**6**
Q	(Japan) **Y Kamio**	0	**6**	**6**
(Russia) E Likhovtseva	**6**	1	3
8	(France) **N Tauziat**	**6**	**6**
(United States) M Werdel-Witmeyer	2	2
(Netherlands) M Oremans	1	4
(Chinese Taipei) **S-T Wang**	**6**	**6**
(Germany) S Hack	6	3
(Japan) **N Sawamatsu**	**7**	**6**

Second round
5	(Argentina) **G Sabatini**	**6**	**7**
(Sweden) Å Carlsson	1	5
Q	(Japan) Y Kamio	2	5
4	(Japan) **K Date**	**6**	**7**
8	(France) **N Tauziat**	**6**	**6**
(Chinese Taipei) S-T Wang	4	2
(Japan) N Sawamatsu	1	**6**	1
2	(Spain) **C Martínez**	**6**	2	**6**

Quarterfinals
5	(Argentina) G Sabatini	4	1
4	(Japan) **K Date**	**6**	**6**
8	(France) N Tauziat	3	4
2	(Spain) **C Martínez**	**6**	**6**

Semifinals
4	(Japan) **K Date**	**6**	**7**
2	(Spain) C Martínez	2	5
