= 1996 WTA German Open – Singles =

Singles
- 1996 WTA German Open
- 1995 Champion: (Spain) Arantxa Sánchez Vicario

Final
- Champion: (Germany) Steffi Graf
- Runner-up: (Slovakia) Karina Habšudová
- Score: 4–6, 6–2, 7–5

Details
- Draw: 56
- Seeds: 16

Events
Singles	Doubles
← 1995 ·	WTA German Open	· 1997 →

Steffi Graf defeated Karina Habšudová in the final, 4–6, 6–2, 7–5 to win the singles tennis title at the 1996 WTA German Open.

Arantxa Sánchez Vicario was the defending champion, but lost in the quarterfinals to Elena Likhovtseva.

== Seeds ==
A champion seed is indicated in bold text while text in italics indicates the round in which that seed was eliminated. The top eight seeds received a bye to the second round.

1. (Germany) **Steffi Graf (champion)**
2. (Spain) Arantxa Sánchez Vicario (quarterfinals)
3. (Croatia) Iva Majoli (semifinals)
4. (Germany) Anke Huber (quarterfinals)
5. (France) Mary Pierce (third round)
6. (South Africa) Amanda Coetzer (second round)
7. (Austria) Barbara Paulus (quarterfinals)
8. (Belarus) Natasha Zvereva (second round)
9. (Switzerland) Martina Hingis (second round)
10. (France) Nathalie Tauziat (quarterfinals)
11. (Japan) Ai Sugiyama (first round)
12. (Austria) Judith Wiesner (third round)
13. (Japan) Naoko Sawamatsu (third round)
14. (Indonesia) Yayuk Basuki (third round)
15. (Germany) Sabine Hack (third round)
16. (France) Sandrine Testud (second round)

== Draw ==
=== Key ===
- Q = Qualifier
- WC = Wild card
- LL = Lucky loser
- Alt = Alternate
- ITF = ITF entry
- PR = Protected ranking
- SR = Special ranking
- SE = Special exempt
- JE = Junior exempt
- JR = Junior Accelerator Programme entrant
- CO = College Accelerator Programme entrant
- NG = Next Gen Accelerator Program entrant
- w/o = Walkover
- r = Retired
- d = Defaulted

=== Finals ===
Semifinals
WC/1	(Germany) **Steffi Graf**	**7**	**6**
3	(Croatia) Iva Majoli	5	1
(Slovakia) **Karina Habšudová**	**6**	**7**
(Russia) Elena Likhovtseva	1	6

Final
WC/1	(Germany) **Steffi Graf**	4	**6**	**7**
(Slovakia) Karina Habšudová	**6**	2	5

=== Top half ===
==== Section 1 ====
First round
WC	(Germany) M Weingärtner	**6**	2	2
(United States) **T Whitlinger-Jones**	4	**6**	**6**
Q	(Spain) Á Montolio	5	3
(Federal Republic of Yugoslavia) **T Ječmenica**	**7**	**6**
(Poland) M Grzybowska	3	**6**	5
14	(Indonesia) **Y Basuki**	**6**	1	**7**
10	(France) **N Tauziat**	**7**	**7**
(Russia) E Makarova	5	5
(Italy) R Grande	**6**	2	2
(Israel) **A Smashnova**	4	**6**	**6**
(Germany) **J Kandarr**	5	**7**	**6**
(United States) A Grossman	**7**	6	4

Second round
WC/1	(Germany) **S Graf**	**6**	**6**
(United States) T Whitlinger-Jones	1	2
(Federal Republic of Yugoslavia) T Ječmenica	1	r
14	(Indonesia) **Y Basuki**	**5**
10	(France) **N Tauziat**	**6**	**6**
(Israel) A Smashnova	4	3
(Germany) **J Kandarr**	**7**	2	**6**
6	(South Africa) A Coetzer	6	**6**	3

Third round
WC/1	(Germany) **S Graf**	**6**	**6**
14	(Indonesia) Y Basuki	2	1
10	(France) **N Tauziat**	**6**	**6**
(Germany) J Kandarr	3	4

Quarterfinals
WC/1	(Germany) **S Graf**	**6**	**7**
10	(France) N Tauziat	1	5

==== Section 2 ====
First round
(Sweden) **Å Carlsson**	**6**	**6**
(United States) S Cacic	2	3
(United States) N Arendt	4	4
WC	(Germany) **S Klösel**	**6**	**6**
WC	(Germany) A Glass	2	4
15	(Germany) **S Hack**	**6**	**6**
12	(Austria) **J Wiesner**	4	**6**	**6**
(Netherlands) K Boogert	**6**	4	2
(Slovakia) R Zrubáková	2	**6**	0
Q	(Austria) **S Dopfer**	**6**	0	**6**
(Poland) **K Nowak**	**6**	**6**
(Germany) C Singer	3	4

Second round
3	(Croatia) **I Majoli**	1	**7**	**6**
(Sweden) Å Carlsson	**6**	5	2
WC	(Germany) S Klösel	1	3
15	(Germany) **S Hack**	**6**	**6**
12	(Austria) **J Wiesner**	**7**	**6**
Q	(Austria) S Dopfer	6	2
(Poland) K Nowak	2	3
7	(Austria) **B Paulus**	**6**	**6**

Third round
3	(Croatia) **I Majoli**	**6**	**6**
15	(Germany) S Hack	2	4
12	(Austria) J Wiesner	3	4
7	(Austria) **B Paulus**	**6**	**6**

Quarterfinals
3	(Croatia) **I Majoli**	**6**	3	**6**
7	(Austria) B Paulus	3	**6**	3

=== Bottom half ===
==== Section 3 ====
First round
(Germany) **B Rittner**	**6**	**6**
Q	(Argentina) B Fulco-Villella	4	2
(Slovakia) **K Habšudová**	**7**	4	**6**
(Austria) B Schett	6	**6**	4
(United States) J Watanabe	3	0
9	(Switzerland) **M Hingis**	**6**	**6**
13	(Japan) **N Sawamatsu**	**6**	5	**6**
(Spain) V Ruano-Pascual	4	**7**	3
(Germany) **P Begerow**	**6**	**7**
(Argentina) F Labat	3	6
(United States) **L Lee**	**6**	**6**
(Latvia) L Neiland	2	2

Second round
5	(France) **M Pierce**	**6**	**6**
(Germany) B Rittner	2	3
(Slovakia) **K Habšudová**	**6**	**7**
9	(Switzerland) M Hingis	3	5
13	(Japan) **N Sawamatsu**	**6**	**6**
(Germany) P Begerow	4	3
(United States) L Lee	**6**	5	3
4	(Germany) **A Huber**	3	**7**	**6**

Third round
5	(France) M Pierce	**7**	2	6
(Slovakia) **K Habšudová**	6	**6**	**7**
13	(Japan) N Sawamatsu	0	1
4	(Germany) **A Huber**	**6**	**6**

Quarterfinals
(Slovakia) **K Habšudová**	**6**	**6**
4	(Germany) A Huber	4	1

==== Section 4 ====
First round
(Romania) **R Dragomir**	4	**6**	**6**
(Hungary) A Temesvári	**6**	2	3
Q	(Madagascar) D Randriantefy	3	3
(Australia) **N Bradtke**	**6**	**6**
(Russia) **E Likhovtseva**	**6**	**6**
11	(Japan) A Sugiyama	3	2
16	(France) **S Testud**	**6**	**6**
(South Africa) J Kruger	1	4
(Australia) R McQuillan	4	3
(Czech Republic) **L Richterová**	**6**	**6**
(United States) **M Werdel-Witmeyer**	**6**	**6**
(Germany) S Meier	4	4

Second round
8	(Belarus) N Zvereva	**7**	2	6
(Romania) **R Dragomir**	5	**6**	**7**
(Australia) N Bradtke	0	0
(Russia) **E Likhovtseva**	**6**	**6**
16	(France) S Testud	6	2
(Czech Republic) **L Richterová**	**7**	**6**
(United States) M Werdel-Witmeyer	3	3
2	(Spain) **A Sánchez Vicario**	**6**	**6**

Third round
(Romania) R Dragomir	3	**6**	6
(Russia) **E Likhovtseva**	**6**	3	**7**
(Czech Republic) L Richterová	**7**	3	6
2	(Spain) **A Sánchez Vicario**	6	**6**	**7**

Quarterfinals
(Russia) **E Likhovtseva**	**6**	2	**6**
2	(Spain) A Sánchez Vicario	3	**6**	0
