= Park Sung-hee =

South Korean tennis player

Park Sung-hee 박성희
- Country (sports): South Korea
- Residence: Seoul, Korea
- Born: 17 February 1975 (age 51) Busan, Korea
- Height: 1.67 m (5 ft 6 in)
- Turned pro: 1989
- Retired: 2000
- Plays: Right (two-handed backhand)
- Prize money: $439,788

Singles
- Career record: 196–152
- Career titles: 7 ITF
- Highest ranking: No. 57 (25 September 1995)

Grand Slam singles results
- Australian Open: 2R (1995, 1996)
- French Open: 2R (1996, 1997, 1998)
- Wimbledon: 2R (1995, 1996)
- US Open: 2R (1998)

Doubles
- Career record: 120–96
- Career titles: 7 ITF
- Highest ranking: No. 34 (15 June 1998)

Grand Slam doubles results
- Australian Open: 3R (1997, 1998)
- French Open: 3R (1996)
- Wimbledon: 2R (1997)
- US Open: 2R (1996, 1997)

Park Sung-hee (Korean: 박성희; born 17 February 1975) is a former tennis player from South Korea.

== Career ==
Park who turned professional in 1989 won seven singles and seven doubles titles on the ITF Women's Circuit. In her career, she reached four doubles finals on the WTA Tour but always ended runner-up. Her best Grand Slam performances came in doubles, reaching the round of 16 at the 1996 French Open, 1997 Australian Open, and the 1998 Australian Open, all partnering with Wang Shi-ting. She reached career-high rankings of No. 34 in doubles (in June 1998) and No. 57 in singles (in September 1995).

Park played in nine years 34 ties for the South Korea Fed Cup team, with a 30–14 record overall and 24–12 in singles, all team records. She retired from the tour in 2000.

== Grand Slam tournament performance timeline ==
Key
W	F	SF	QF	#R	RR	Q#	DNQ	A	NH

(W) winner; (F) finalist; (SF) semifinalist; (QF) quarterfinalist; (#R) rounds 4, 3, 2, 1; (RR) round-robin stage; (Q#) qualification round; (DNQ) did not qualify; (A) absent; (NH) not held; (SR) strike rate (events won / competed); (W–L) win–loss record.

=== Singles ===
Tournament	1993	1994	1995	1996	1997	1998	1999	W–L	Win %
Australian Open	Q1	Q2	2R	2R	1R	1R	1R	2–5	29%
French Open	Q2	Q1	1R	2R	1R	A	Q1	1–3	25%
Wimbledon	Q2	Q1	2R	2R	Q1	1R	Q1	2–3	40%
US Open	A	A	1R	1R	Q2	2R	Q1	1–3	25%
Win–loss	0–0	0–0	0–1	3–4	3–3	1–3	0–1	6–14	30%

== WTA Tour finals ==
=== Doubles: 4 (4 runner-ups) ===
Legend
Tier I
Tier II (0–1)
Tier III (0–1)
Tier IV & V (0–2)

Result	No.	Date	Tournament	Surface	Partner	Opponents	Score
Loss	1.	Sep 1995	Nagoya, Japan	Carpet (i)	(Japan) Rika Hiraki	(Australia) Kerry-Anne Guse (Australia) Kristine Kunce	6–4, 6–4
Loss	2.	Jan 1996	Hobart, Australia	Hard	(Australia) Kerry-Anne Guse	(Indonesia) Yayuk Basuki (Japan) Kyoko Nagatsuka	7–6^{(9–7)}, 6–3
Loss	3.	Sep 1996	Tokyo, Japan	Hard	(Chinese Taipei) Wang Shi-ting	(South Africa) Amanda Coetzer (France) Mary Pierce	6–1, 7–6^{(7–5)}
Loss	4.	Jan 1998	Gold Coast, Australia	Hard	(Chinese Taipei) Wang Shi-ting	(Russia) Elena Likhovtseva (Japan) Ai Sugiyama	1–6, 6–3, 6–4

== ITF finals ==
Legend
$75,000 tournaments
$50,000 tournaments
$25,000 tournaments
$10,000 tournaments

=== Singles: 13 (7–6) ===
Result	No.	Date	Tournament	Surface	Opponent	Score
Loss	1.	30 September 1991	ITF Sekisho, Japan	Hard	(China) Chen Li	2–6, 4–6
Loss	2.	7 June 1992	ITF Incheon, South Korea	Clay	(South Korea) Kim Yeon-sook	3–6, 1–6
Loss	3.	8 June 1992	ITF Seoul, South Korea	Hard	(South Korea) Kim Il-soon	4–6, 3–6
Win	4.	10 August 1992	ITF Taipei, Taiwan	Hard	(Thailand) Tamarine Tanasugarn	6–3, 6–1
Win	5.	17 August 1992	ITF Taipei, Taiwan	Hard	(Sri Lanka) Lihini Weerasuriya	6–3, 1–6, 7–6^{(2)}
Win	6.	24 August 1992	ITF Taipei, Taiwan	Hard	(Sri Lanka) Lihini Weerasuriya	7–5, 3–6, 6–4
Win	7.	31 August 1992	ITF Taipei, Taiwan	Hard	(Sri Lanka) Lihini Weerasuriya	6–2, 3–6, 6–4
Win	8.	6 June 1993	ITF Incheon, South Korea	Clay	(South Korea) Kim Yeon-sook	2-6, 7–5, 7–6^{(5)}
Win	9.	14 September 1997	ITF Seoul, South Korea	Hard	(Australia) Kerry-Anne Guse	6–3, 6–4
Win	10.	26 October 1997	ITF Houston, United States	Hard	(Japan) Haruka Inoue	6–1, 7–6^{(2)}
Loss	11.	3 May 1998	Kangaroo Cup, Japan	Grass	(Japan) Misumi Miyauchi	3–6, 4–6
Loss	12.	18 October 1998	ITF Seoul, South Korea	Hard	(South Korea) Choi Ju-yeon	4–6, 3–6
Loss	13.	2 May 1999	Kōfu International Open, Japan	Grass	(Chinese Taipei) Wang Shi-ting	7–6, 5–7, 2–6

=== Doubles: 15 (7–8) ===
Result	No.	Date	Tournament	Surface	Partner	Opponents	Score
Loss	1.	18 August 1991	ITF Taipei, Taiwan	Hard	(South Korea) Pyo Hye-jeong	(South Korea) Choi Jin (South Korea) Choi Jeom-sang	2–6, 3–6
Loss	2.	1 September 1991	ITF Taipei, Taiwan	Hard	(South Korea) Pyo Hye-jeong	(South Korea) Kim Il-soon (South Korea) Sohn Mi-ae	5–7, 4–6
Win	3.	17 August 1992	ITF Taipei, Taiwan	Hard	(South Korea) Seo Hye-jin	(South Korea) Doh Jeom-ja (South Korea) Lee Mi-jeong	6–2, 7–6^{(5)}
Win	4.	24 August 1992	ITF Taipei, Taiwan	Hard	(South Korea) Seo Hye-jin	(South Korea) Doh Jeom-ja (South Korea) Lee Mi-jeong	6–2, 7–6^{(6)}
Loss	5.	6 June 1993	ITF Incheon, South Korea	Clay	(South Korea) Seo Hye-jin	(South Korea) Kim Soon-mi (South Korea) Pyo Hye-jeong	2–6, 6–7^{(5)}
Win	6.	30 May 1994	ITF Daegu, South Korea	Clay	(South Korea) Kim Il-soon	(South Korea) Kim Soon-mi (South Korea) Pyo Hye-jeong	6–7^{(1)}, 6–1, 6–4
Win	7.	11 July 1994	ITF Darmstadt, Germany	Clay	(South Korea) Choi Ju-yeon	(Argentina) Bettina Fulco (Argentina) Patricia Tarabini	6–4, 6–3
Loss	8.	5 May 1997	ITF Seoul, South Korea	Clay	(South Korea) Choi Young-ja	(South Korea) Cho Yoon-jeong (South Korea) Kim Eun-ha	3–6, 6–7^{(6)}
Loss	9.	14 September 1997	ITF Seoul, South Korea	Hard	(Chinese Taipei) Wang Shi-ting	(Australia) Catherine Barclay (Australia) Kerry-Anne Guse	6–4, 4–6, 1–6
Win	10.	27 October 1997	ITF Austin, United States	Hard	(Japan) Miho Saeki	(United States) Debbie Graham (United States) Meredith McGrath	6–4, 5–7, 6–2
Loss	11.	3 May 1998	Kangaroo Cup, Japan	Grass	(South Korea) Cho Yoon-jeong	(Australia) Catherine Barclay (Australia) Kerry-Anne Guse	6–7^{(3)}, 4–6
Win	12.	10 May 1998	ITF Seoul, South Korea	Clay	(South Korea) Cho Yoon-jeong	(China) Ding Ding (China) Li Ting	6–1, 3–6, 6–2
Win	13.	21 March 1999	ITF Noda, Japan	Hard	(South Korea) Cho Yoon-jeong	(Japan) Shinobu Asagoe (Japan) Yuka Yoshida	6–3, 6–3
Loss	14.	24 May 1999	ITF Warsaw, Poland	Clay	(South Korea) Cho Yoon-jeong	(Romania) Magda Mihalache (Croatia) Jelena Kostanić Tošić	1–6, 3–6
Loss	15.	3 October 1999	ITF Seoul, South Korea	Hard	(Thailand) Tamarine Tanasugarn	(Australia) Catherine Barclay (South Korea) Kim Eun-ha	6–4, 4–6, 2–6
