= 1974 Virginia Slims of Philadelphia – Singles =

Singles
- 1974 Virginia Slims of Philadelphia

Final
- Champion: (Soviet Union) Olga Morozova
- Runner-up: (United States) Billie Jean King
- Score: 7–6^{(5–2)}, 6–1

Details
- Draw: 32
- Seeds: 8

Events
| Singles | Doubles |
| ← 1973 · | Advanta Championships of Philadelphia | · 1975 → |

Margaret Court was the defending champion, but did not compete this year.

Olga Morozova won the title by defeating Billie Jean King 7–6^{(5–2)}, 6–1 in the final. Morozova had to hand the prize money over to the Soviet Tennis Federation.

== Seeds ==
1. (United States) Billie Jean King (final)
2. (Australia) Evonne Goolagong (second round)
3. (Australia) Kerry Melville (quarterfinals)
4. (United States) Nancy Richey Gunter (first round, withdrew)
5. (United Kingdom) Virginia Wade (semifinals)
6. (United States) Rosemary Casals (semifinals)
7. (Soviet Union) Olga Morozova (champion)
8. (South Africa) Ilana Kloss (second round)

== Draw ==
=== Key ===
- Q = Qualifier
- WC = Wild card
- LL = Lucky loser
- Alt = Alternate
- SE = Special exempt
- PR = Protected ranking
- ITF = ITF entry
- JE = Junior exempt
- w/o = Walkover
- r = Retired
- d = Defaulted
- SR = Special ranking

=== Finals ===
Semifinals
1 | (United States) Billie Jean King | 7 | 6
5 | (United Kingdom) Virginia Wade | 5 | 4
6 | (United States) Rosemary Casals | 7 | 3 | 4
7 | (Soviet Union) Olga Morozova | 5 | 6 | 6

Final
1 | (United States) Billie Jean King | 6^{2} | 1
7 | (Soviet Union) Olga Morozova | 7^{5} | 6

=== Top half ===
First round
1 | (United States) BJ King | 6 | 6
(Australia) D Fromholtz | 4 | 3
(Australia) K Krantzche | 6 | 6
(Australia) K Harris | 2 | 1
8 | (South Africa) I Kloss | w/o
(United States) M Schallau
(United States) K Pigeon | 5 | 1
(United States) J Newberry | 7 | 6
4 | (United States) N Richey Gunter
(United Kingdom) G Coles | w/o
(United States) J Schwikert | 4 | 3
(United States) T Holladay | 6 | 6
5 | (United Kingdom) V Wade | 6 | 6
(United States) V Ziegenfuss | 3 | 2
(United States) P Teeguarden | 5 | 4
(Australia) L Hunt | 7 | 6

Second round
1 | (United States) BJ King | 6 | 6
(Australia) K Krantzche | 2 | 3
8 | (South Africa) I Kloss | 4 | 1
(United States) J Newberry | 6 | 6
(United Kingdom) G Coles | 3 | 6 | 6
(United States) T Holladay | 6 | 3 | 2
5 | (United Kingdom) V Wade | 6 | 6
(Australia) L Hunt | 4 | 3

Quarterfinals
1 | (United States) BJ King | 7 | 6
(United States) J Newberry | 5 | 0
(United Kingdom) G Coles | 6 | 1 | 4
5 | (United Kingdom) V Wade | 4 | 6 | 6

Semifinals
1 | (United States) BJ King | 7 | 6
5 | (United Kingdom) V Wade | 5 | 4

=== Bottom half ===
First round
(United States) M Louie | 4 | 7 | 3
(United States) K Kuykendall | 6 | 5 | 6
(United States) T Bostrom | 2 | 3
6 | (United States) R Casals | 6 | 6
(Japan) K Sawamatsu | 4 | 7 | 7
(France) F Dürr | 6 | 5 | 6
(United States) BA Hansen | 3 | 6
3 | (Australia) K Melville | 6 | 7
(Netherlands) B Stöve | 6 | 6
(United States) K Kemmer | 3 | 2
(West Germany) H Masthoff | 2 | 4
7 | (Soviet Union) O Morozova | 6 | 6
(United States) S Greer | 2 | 3
(Australia) H Gourlay | 6 | 6
(United States) S Stap | 5 | 4
2 | (Australia) E Goolagong | 7 | 6

Second round
(United States) K Kuykendall | 2 | 1
6 | (United States) R Casals | 6 | 6
(Japan) K Sawamatsu | 2 | 2
3 | (Australia) K Melville | 6 | 6
(Netherlands) B Stöve | 6 | 3 | 5
7 | (Soviet Union) O Morozova | 3 | 6 | 7
(Australia) H Gourlay | 6 | 3 | 7
2 | (Australia) E Goolagong | 3 | 6 | 6

Quarterfinals
6 | (United States) R Casals | 6 | 6
3 | (Australia) K Melville | 3 | 4
7 | (Soviet Union) O Morozova | 6 | 6
(Australia) H Gourlay | 3 | 2

Semifinals
6 | (United States) R Casals | 7 | 3 | 4
7 | (Soviet Union) O Morozova | 5 | 6 | 6
