= 1995 Advanta Championships of Philadelphia =

- Date: November 6–12
- Edition: 13th
- Category: Tier I
- Draw: 28S / 16D
- Prize money: $806,250
- Surface: Carpet / indoor
- Location: Philadelphia, PA, U.S.
- Venue: Philadelphia Civic Center

Champions

Singles
- (Germany) Steffi Graf

Doubles
- (United States) Lori McNeil / (Czechoslovakia) Helena Suková
← 1994 ·	Championships of Philadelphia	· 1996 →

The 1995 Advanta Championships of Philadelphia was a women's tennis tournament played on indoor carpet courts at the Philadelphia Civic Center in Philadelphia, Pennsylvania in the United States that was part of the Tier I category of the 1995 WTA Tour. It was the 13th edition of the tournament and was held from November 6 through November 12, 1995. First-seeded Steffi Graf won the singles title and earned $148,500 first-prize money.

== Finals ==
=== Singles ===
(Germany) Steffi Graf defeated (United States) Lori McNeil 6–1, 4–6, 6–3

- It was Graf's 8th singles title of the year and the 94th of her career.

=== Doubles ===
(United States) Lori McNeil / (Czechoslovakia) Helena Suková defeated (United States) Meredith McGrath / (Latvia) Larisa Savchenko 4–6, 6–3, 6–4
