= 1974 Virginia Slims of Philadelphia – Doubles =

Doubles
- 1974 Virginia Slims of Philadelphia

Final
- Champions: (United States) Rosemary Casals (United States) Billie Jean King
- Runners-up: (Australia) Kerry Harris (Australia) Lesley Hunt
- Score: 6–3, 7–6

Details
- Draw: 16
- Seeds: 4

Events
Singles	Doubles
← 1973 ·	Advanta Championships of Philadelphia	· 1975 →

Margaret Court and Lesley Hunt were the defending champions, but Court did not compete this year.

Hunt teamed up with Kerry Harris and lost in the final to Rosemary Casals and Billie Jean King. The score was 6–3, 7–6.

== Seeds ==
1. (United States) Rosemary Casals / (United States) Billie Jean King (champions)
2. (Australia) Evonne Goolagong / (Soviet Union) Olga Morozova (quarterfinals, withdrew)
3. (France) Françoise Dürr / (Netherlands) Betty Stöve (semifinals)
4. (Australia) Karen Krantzcke / (United Kingdom) Virginia Wade (semifinals)

== Draw ==
=== Key ===
- Q = Qualifier
- WC = Wild card
- LL = Lucky loser
- Alt = Alternate
- SE = Special exempt
- PR = Protected ranking
- ITF = ITF entry
- JE = Junior exempt
- w/o = Walkover
- r = Retired
- d = Defaulted
- SR = Special ranking

=== Draw ===
First round
1	(United States) R Casals (United States) BJ King	4	6	6
(United States) TA Fretz (United States) S Greer	6	2	1
(United States) T Holladay (United States) K Latham	2	2
(Australia) D Fromholtz (United States) J Newberry	6	6
4	(Australia) K Krantzcke (United Kingdom) V Wade	6	3	7
(United States) BA Hansen (United States) K Kuykendall	4	6	6
(Australia) H Gourlay (South Africa) I Kloss	w/o
(United States) P Bostrom (United States) M Schallau
(United States) K Pigeon (United States) P Teeguarden	3	6
(United States) K Kemmer (United States) V Ziegenfuss	6	7
(United States) M Louie (United States) J Schwikert	2	4
3	(France) F Dürr (Netherlands) B Stöve	6	6
(West Germany) H Masthoff (Japan) K Sawamatsu
(Australia) K Harris (Australia) L Hunt	w/o
(United Kingdom) G Coles (United States) S Stap	5	3
2	(Australia) E Goolagong (Soviet Union) O Morozova	7	6

Quarterfinals
1	(United States) R Casals (United States) BJ King	6	6
(Australia) D Fromholtz (United States) J Newberry	0	2
4	(Australia) K Krantzcke (United Kingdom) V Wade	4	7	6
(Australia) H Gourlay (South Africa) I Kloss	6	5	3
(United States) K Kemmer (United States) V Ziegenfuss	4	4
3	(France) F Dürr (Netherlands) B Stöve	6	6
(Australia) K Harris (Australia) L Hunt	w/o
2	(Australia) E Goolagong (Soviet Union) O Morozova

Semifinals
1	(United States) R Casals (United States) BJ King	1	6	6
4	(Australia) K Krantzcke (United Kingdom) V Wade	6	3	2
3	(France) F Dürr (Netherlands) B Stöve	3	6	5
(Australia) K Harris (Australia) L Hunt	6	1	7

Final
1	(United States) R Casals (United States) BJ King	6	7
(Australia) K Harris (Australia) L Hunt	3	6
