= 1991 Virginia Slims of Philadelphia – Singles =

Singles
- 1991 Virginia Slims of Philadelphia

Final
- Champion: (Socialist Federal Republic of Yugoslavia) Monica Seles
- Runner-up: (United States) Jennifer Capriati
- Score: 7–5, 6–1

Details
- Draw: 28
- Seeds: 8

Events
Singles	Doubles
← 1979 ·	Advanta Championships of Philadelphia	· 1992 →

The last edition of the tournament was in 1979, which was won by Wendy Turnbull.

Monica Seles won the title by defeating Jennifer Capriati 7–5, 6–1 in the final.

== Seeds ==
The top four seeds received a bye to the second round.

1. (Socialist Federal Republic of Yugoslavia) Monica Seles (champion)
2. (Argentina) Gabriela Sabatini (semifinals)
3. (Spain) Arantxa Sánchez Vicario (semifinals)
4. (United States) Jennifer Capriati (final)
5. (United States) Mary Joe Fernández (first round)
6. (Spain) Conchita Martínez (quarterfinals)
7. (Switzerland) Manuela Maleeva-Fragnière (quarterfinals)
8. (United States) Zina Garrison (quarterfinals)

== Draw ==
=== Key ===
- Q = Qualifier
- WC = Wild card
- LL = Lucky loser
- Alt = Alternate
- SE = Special exempt
- PR = Protected ranking
- ITF = ITF entry
- JE = Junior exempt
- w/o = Walkover
- r = Retired
- d = Defaulted
- SR = Special ranking

=== Finals ===
Semifinals
1	(Socialist Federal Republic of Yugoslavia) Monica Seles	6	6
3	(Spain) Arantxa Sánchez Vicario	1	2
4	(United States) Jennifer Capriati	6	6
2	(Argentina) Gabriela Sabatini	3	4

Final
1	(Socialist Federal Republic of Yugoslavia) Monica Seles	7	6
4	(United States) Jennifer Capriati	5	1

=== Top half ===
First round
(Soviet Union) L Savchenko	6	4	6^{7}
(United States) M Werdel	4	6	7^{9}
(South Africa) R Fairbank-Nideffer	3	2
(Australia) N Provis	6	6
(United Kingdom) J Moore	0	0
8	(United States) Z Garrison	6	6
(United States) T Whitlinger	6	7
(United States) S Stafford	0	5
(United States) P Harper	6	6
(United States) Michele Wreem	3	0
(Netherlands) B Schultz	6	2	6
5	(United States) MJ Fernández	1	6	4

Second round
1	(Socialist Federal Republic of Yugoslavia) M Seles	7	6
(United States) M Werdel	5	1
(Australia) N Provis	4	4
8	(United States) Z Garrison	6	6
3	(Spain) A Sánchez Vicario	6	3	6
(United States) T Whitlinger	0	6	2
(United States) P Harper	3	4
(Netherlands) B Schultz	6	6

Quarterfinals
1	(Socialist Federal Republic of Yugoslavia) M Seles	7^{8}	6
8	(United States) Z Garrison	6^{6}	0
3	(Spain) A Sánchez Vicario	6^{4}	6	6
(Netherlands) B Schultz	7^{7}	1	4

Semifinals
1	(Socialist Federal Republic of Yugoslavia) M Seles	6	6
3	(Spain) A Sánchez Vicario	1	2

=== Bottom half ===
First round
7	(Switzerland) M Maleeva-Fragnière	6	6
(Australia) E Smylie	1	2
(United States) G Helgeson	0	2
(United States) A Frazier	6	6
(United States) L McNeil	6	1	6
(Czechoslovakia) E Švíglerová	1	6	2
6	(Spain) C Martínez	6	6
(Sweden) C Lindqvist	2	4
(Czechoslovakia) H Suková	6	6
(Soviet Union) E Brioukhovets	3	4
(Belgium) S Appelmans	4	2
(Soviet Union) N Zvereva	6	6

Second round
7	(Switzerland) M Maleeva-Fragnière	6	6
(United States) A Frazier	3	3
(United States) L McNeil	6^{9}	7^{7}	2
4	(United States) J Capriati	7^{11}	6^{4}	6
6	(Spain) C Martínez	6	6
(Czechoslovakia) H Suková	3	2
(Soviet Union) N Zvereva	6^{5}	6	2
2	(Argentina) G Sabatini	7^{7}	2	6

Quarterfinals
7	(Switzerland) M Maleeva-Fragnière	3	2
4	(United States) J Capriati	6	6
6	(Spain) C Martínez	3	0
2	(Argentina) G Sabatini	6	6

Semifinals
4	(United States) J Capriati	6	6
2	(Argentina) G Sabatini	3	4
