= 1997 Advanta Championships of Philadelphia – Doubles =

Doubles
- 1997 Advanta Championships of Philadelphia
- 1996 Champions: (United States) Lisa Raymond (Australia) Rennae Stubbs

Final
- Champions: (United States) Lisa Raymond (Australia) Rennae Stubbs
- Runners-up: (United States) Lindsay Davenport (Czech Republic) Jana Novotná
- Score: 6–3, 7–5

Details
- Draw: 16
- Seeds: 4

Events
Singles	Doubles
← 1996 ·	Advanta Championships of Philadelphia	· 1998 →

Lisa Raymond and Rennae Stubbs were the defending champions and won in the final 6–3, 7–5 against Lindsay Davenport and Jana Novotná.

== Seeds ==
Champion seeds are indicated in bold text while text in italics indicates the round in which those seeds were eliminated.

1. (Switzerland) Martina Hingis / (Spain) Arantxa Sánchez Vicario (first round)
2. (United States) Lindsay Davenport / (Czech Republic) Jana Novotná (final)
3. n/a
4. (Indonesia) Yayuk Basuki / (Netherlands) Caroline Vis (first round)

== Draw ==
=== Key ===
- Q = Qualifier
- WC = Wild card
- LL = Lucky loser
- Alt = Alternate
- ITF = ITF entry
- PR = Protected ranking
- SR = Special ranking
- SE = Special exempt
- JE = Junior exempt
- JR = Junior Accelerator Programme entrant
- CO = College Accelerator Programme entrant
- NG = Next Gen Accelerator Program entrant
- w/o = Walkover
- r = Retired
- d = Defaulted

First round
1	(Switzerland) M Hingis (Spain) A Sánchez Vicario	5	**6**	4
(South Africa) **M de Swardt** (United States) **M McGrath**	**7**	2	**6**
(Russia) E Likhovtseva (Japan) A Sugiyama	2	4
(United States) **L McNeil** (United States) **C Rubin**	**6**	**6**
4	(Indonesia) Y Basuki (Netherlands) C Vis	**6**	0	r
(Germany) **A Huber** (United States) **M Seles**	4	**3**
(United States) **L Raymond** (Australia) **R Stubbs**	**6**	**6**
(Spain) C Martínez (Argentina) P Tarabini	3	3
(United States) **K Adams** (United States) **D Graham**	4	**7**	**6**
(Romania) R Dragomir (Croatia) I Majoli	**6**	6	4
(France) **A Fusai** (France) **N Tauziat**	**w/o**
LL	(Romania) C Cristea (Canada) M Drake
(Latvia) **L Neiland** (Czech Republic) **H Suková**	**6**	**6**
(Japan) N Kijimuta (Japan) N Miyagi	2	4
Q	(Chinese Taipei) J Lee (United States) L Lee	2	**7**	6
2	(United States) **L Davenport** (Czech Republic) **J Novotná**	**6**	5	**7**

Quarterfinals
(South Africa) **M de Swardt** (United States) **M McGrath**	**6**	**6**
(United States) L McNeil (United States) C Rubin	2	3
(Germany) A Huber (United States) M Seles	6	**7**	4
(United States) **L Raymond** (Australia) **R Stubbs**	**7**	5	**6**
(United States) K Adams (United States) D Graham	6	3
(France) **A Fusai** (France) **N Tauziat**	**7**	**6**
(Latvia) L Neiland (Czech Republic) H Suková	5	3
2	(United States) **L Davenport** (Czech Republic) **J Novotná**	**7**	**6**

Semifinals
(South Africa) M de Swardt (United States) M McGrath	5	3
(United States) **L Raymond** (Australia) **R Stubbs**	**7**	**6**
(France) A Fusai (France) N Tauziat	**6**	4	1
2	(United States) **L Davenport** (Czech Republic) **J Novotná**	4	**6**	**6**

Final
(United States) **Lisa Raymond** (Australia) **Rennae Stubbs**	**6**	**7**
2	(United States) Lindsay Davenport (Czech Republic) Jana Novotná	3	5
