= 1978 Virginia Slims of Philadelphia – Singles =

Singles
- 1978 Virginia Slims of Philadelphia

Final
- Champion: (United States) Chris Evert
- Runner-up: (United States) Billie Jean King
- Score: 6–0, 6–4

Details
- Draw: 32
- Seeds: 8

Events
Singles	Doubles
← 1977 ·	Advanta Championships of Philadelphia	· 1979 →

Chris Evert was the defending champion and successfully defended her title, by defeating Billie Jean King 6–0, 6–4 in the final.

== Seeds ==
1. (United States) Chris Evert (champion)
2. (Australia) ~~Evonne Goolagong~~ (withdrew)
3. (Netherlands) Betty Stöve (quarterfinals)
4. (United States) Tracy Austin (quarterfinals)
5. (United Kingdom) Virginia Wade (semifinals)
6. (United States) Billie Jean King (final)
7. (Australia) Wendy Turnbull (quarterfinals)
8. (Australia) Kerry Reid (quarterfinals)

== Draw ==
=== Key ===
- Q = Qualifier
- WC = Wild card
- LL = Lucky loser
- Alt = Alternate
- SE = Special exempt
- PR = Protected ranking
- ITF = ITF entry
- JE = Junior exempt
- w/o = Walkover
- r = Retired
- d = Defaulted
- SR = Special ranking

=== Finals ===
Semifinals
1	(United States) Chris Evert	6	6
5	(United Kingdom) Virginia Wade	3	2
6	(United States) Billie Jean King	6	6
(Romania) Virginia Ruzici	1	2

Final
1	(United States) Chris Evert	6	6
6	(United States) Billie Jean King	0	4

=== Top half ===
First round
1	(United States) C Evert	6	6
(United States) L duPont	2	2
(Czechoslovakia) R Maršíková	6	6
(United States) L Antonoplis	3	1
7	(Australia) W Turnbull	3	6	7
(United States) T Holladay	6	4	6
(Socialist Federal Republic of Yugoslavia) M Jaušovec	6	2	4
(Australia) D Fromholtz	4	6	6
4	(United States) T Austin	6	6
(United States) B Potter	2	1
(Australia) L Hunt	3	0
(United States) K May	6	6
5	(United Kingdom) V Wade	7	6
(United States) K Shaw	5	2
(United Kingdom) G Coles	6	6
(United States) R Gerulaitis	3	0

Second round
1	(United States) C Evert	4	6	6
(Czechoslovakia) R Maršíková	6	3	0
7	(Australia) W Turnbull	7^{5}	6
(Australia) D Fromholtz	6^{2}	2
4	(United States) T Austin	6	7^{5}
(United States) K May	3	6^{1}
5	(United Kingdom) V Wade	6	6
(United Kingdom) G Coles	2	3

Quarterfinals
1	(United States) C Evert	6	6
7	(Australia) W Turnbull	2	1
4	(United States) T Austin	4	4
5	(United Kingdom) V Wade	6	6

Semifinals
1	(United States) C Evert	6	6
5	(United Kingdom) V Wade	3	2

=== Bottom half ===
First round
(United States) Z Liess	7	5	3
(West Germany) R Tomanová	5	7	6
(Romania) F Mihai	4	3
6	(United States) BJ King	6	6
(United States) P Teeguarden	3	1
(South Africa) Y Vermaak	6	6
(France) F Dürr	3	2
3	(Netherlands) B Stöve	6	6
(United States) J Russell	2	6	5
(United States) R Casals	6	1	7
(Sweden) H Anliot	3	1
8	(Australia) K Reid	6	6
(United Kingdom) M Tyler	6	6
(United States) J Newberry	4	4
(Romania) V Ruzici	6	6
LL	(West Germany) K Ebbinghaus	1	3

Second round
(West Germany) R Tomanová	1	3
6	(United States) BJ King	6	6
(South Africa) Y Vermaak	7^{5}	1	3
3	(Netherlands) B Stöve	6^{2}	6	6
(United States) R Casals	6	6^{3}	5
8	(Australia) K Reid	3	7^{5}	7
(United Kingdom) M Tyler	6	3	4
(Romania) V Ruzici	4	6	6

Quarterfinals
6	(United States) BJ King	6	6
3	(Netherlands) B Stöve	1	3
8	(Australia) K Reid	1	5
(Romania) V Ruzici	6	7

Semifinals
6	(United States) BJ King	6	6
(Romania) V Ruzici	1	2
