= 2000 Advanta Championships =

- Date: November 6–12
- Edition: 18th
- Category: Tier II
- Draw: 28S / 16D
- Prize money: $535,000
- Surface: Carpet / indoor
- Location: Philadelphia, PA, U.S.
- Venue: Philadelphia Civic Center

Champions

Singles
- (United States) Lindsay Davenport

Doubles
- (Switzerland) Martina Hingis / (Russia) Anna Kournikova
← 1999 ·	Championships of Philadelphia	· 2003 →

The 2000 Advanta Championships was a tennis tournament played on indoor carpet courts at the Philadelphia Civic Center in Philadelphia, Pennsylvania in the United States that was part of Tier II of the 2000 WTA Tour. It was the 18th edition of the tournament and was held from November 6 through November 12, 2000. Second-seeded Lindsay Davenport won the singles title and earned $87,000 first-prize money.

== Finals ==
=== Singles ===
(United States) Lindsay Davenport defeated (Switzerland) Martina Hingis 7–6^{(9–7)}, 6–4

- It was Davenport's 4th singles title of the year and the 30th of her career.

=== Doubles ===
(Switzerland) Martina Hingis / (Russia) Anna Kournikova defeated (United States) Lisa Raymond / (Australia) Rennae Stubbs 6–2, 7–5
