= 1997 Advanta Championships of Philadelphia – Singles =

Singles
- 1997 Advanta Championships of Philadelphia
- 1996 Champion: (Czech Republic) Jana Novotná

Final
- Champion: (Switzerland) Martina Hingis
- Runner-up: (United States) Lindsay Davenport
- Score: 7–5, 6–7^{(7–9)}, 7–6^{(7–4)}

Details
- Draw: 28
- Seeds: 8

Events
Singles	Doubles
← 1996 ·	Advanta Championships of Philadelphia	· 1998 →

Jana Novotná was the defending champion but lost in the quarterfinals to Lindsay Davenport.

Martina Hingis won in the final 7–5, 6–7^{(7–9)}, 7–6^{(7–4)} against Davenport.

== Seeds ==
A champion seed is indicated in bold text while text in italics indicates the round in which that seed was eliminated. The top four seeds received a bye to the second round.

1. (Switzerland) **Martina Hingis (champion)**
2. (Czech Republic) Jana Novotná (quarterfinals)
3. (South Africa) Amanda Coetzer (quarterfinals)
4. (United States) Monica Seles (quarterfinals)
5. (United States) Lindsay Davenport (final)
6. (Croatia) Iva Majoli (first round)
7. (Romania) Irina Spîrlea (semifinals)
8. (Spain) Arantxa Sánchez Vicario (semifinals)

== Draw ==
=== Key ===
- Q = Qualifier
- WC = Wild card
- LL = Lucky loser
- Alt = Alternate
- ITF = ITF entry
- PR = Protected ranking
- SR = Special ranking
- SE = Special exempt
- JE = Junior exempt
- JR = Junior Accelerator Programme entrant
- CO = College Accelerator Programme entrant
- NG = Next Gen Accelerator Program entrant
- w/o = Walkover
- r = Retired
- d = Defaulted

=== Final ===
Final
1	(Switzerland) **Martina Hingis**	**7**	6	**7**
5	(United States) Lindsay Davenport	5	**7**	6

=== Section 1 ===
First round
(Belgium) **S Appelmans**	**6**	**6**
(Romania) R Dragomir	4	1
(Czech Republic) H Suková	3	4
(United States) **L Raymond**	**6**	**6**
(Germany) **A Huber**	**6**	1	**6**
6	(Croatia) I Majoli	3	**6**	3
Q	(China) F Li	6	6
(United States) **C Rubin**	**7**	**7**
(United States) J Capriati	1	2
(Japan) **A Sugiyama**	**6**	**6**
(Indonesia) Y Basuki	2	0
8	(Spain) **A Sánchez Vicario**	**6**	**6**

Second round
1	(Switzerland) **M Hingis**	**6**	4	**6**
(Belgium) S Appelmans	2	**6**	2
(United States) L Raymond	**6**	2	5
(Germany) **A Huber**	2	**6**	**7**
3	(South Africa) **A Coetzer**	**6**	**7**
(United States) C Rubin	4	6
(Japan) A Sugiyama	1	6
8	(Spain) **A Sánchez Vicario**	**6**	**7**

Quarterfinals
1	(Switzerland) **M Hingis**	**7**	5	**6**
(Germany) A Huber	6	**7**	4
3	(South Africa) A Coetzer	2	2
8	(Spain) **A Sánchez Vicario**	**6**	**6**

Semifinals
1	(Switzerland) **M Hingis**	1	**7**	**6**
8	(Spain) A Sánchez Vicario	**6**	6	3

=== Section 2 ===
First round
7	(Romania) **I Spîrlea**	**6**	**6**
WC	(United States) V Williams	3	2
Q	(Germany) M Weingärtner	2	3
Q	(Venezuela) **M Vento**	**6**	**6**
WC	(United States) S Taylor	2	2
(Netherlands) **B Schultz-McCarthy**	**6**	**6**
5	(United States) **L Davenport**	**6**	**6**
(France) N Tauziat	3	3
Q	(United States) S Cacic	3	1
(Spain) **C Martínez**	**6**	**6**
LL	(South Africa) J Kruger	5	1
(United States) **A Frazier**	**7**	**6**

Second round
7	(Romania) **I Spîrlea**	**6**	**6**
Q	(Venezuela) M Vento	2	1
(Netherlands) B Schultz-McCarthy	3	r
4	(United States) **M Seles**	**4**
5	(United States) **L Davenport**	**6**	**6**
(Spain) C Martínez	3	0
(United States) A Frazier	2	1
2	(Czech Republic) **J Novotná**	**6**	**6**

Quarterfinals
7	(Romania) **I Spîrlea**	**6**	**7**
4	(United States) M Seles	4	6
5	(United States) **L Davenport**	**6**	**6**
2	(Czech Republic) J Novotná	3	2

Semifinals
7	(Romania) I Spîrlea	2	4
5	(United States) **L Davenport**	**6**	**6**
