= 1991 Virginia Slims of Philadelphia – Doubles =

Doubles
- 1991 Virginia Slims of Philadelphia

Final
- Champions: (Czechoslovakia) Jana Novotná (Soviet Union) Larisa Savchenko
- Runners-up: (United States) Mary Joe Fernández (United States) Zina Garrison
- Score: 6–2, 6–4

Details
- Draw: 16
- Seeds: 4

Events
Singles	Doubles
← 1979 ·	Advanta Championships of Philadelphia	· 1992 →

The last edition of the tournament was in 1979, which was won by Françoise Dürr and Betty Stöve.

Jana Novotná and Larisa Savchenko won the title by defeating Mary Joe Fernández and Zina Garrison 6–2, 6–4 in the final.

== Seeds ==
1. (Czechoslovakia) Jana Novotná / (Soviet Union) Larisa Savchenko (champions)
2. (United States) Pam Shriver / (Soviet Union) Natasha Zvereva (quarterfinals)
3. (Spain) Arantxa Sánchez Vicario / (Czechoslovakia) Helena Suková (semifinals)
4. (United States) Mary Joe Fernández / (United States) Zina Garrison (final)

== Draw ==
=== Key ===
- Q = Qualifier
- WC = Wild card
- LL = Lucky loser
- Alt = Alternate
- SE = Special exempt
- PR = Protected ranking
- ITF = ITF entry
- JE = Junior exempt
- w/o = Walkover
- r = Retired
- d = Defaulted
- SR = Special ranking

=== Draw ===
First round
1	(Czechoslovakia) J Novotná (Soviet Union) L Savchenko	6	6
(United States) A Leand (United States) P Nelson	2	2
(United States) A Frazier (United States) G Helgeson	6	2	7
(United States) S Stafford (United States) M Werdel	3	6	5
3	(Spain) A Sánchez Vicario (Czechoslovakia) H Suková	6	6
(South Africa) R Fairbank (South Africa) L Gregory	2	4
(United States) P Harper (Spain) C Martínez	6^{7}	6	6
(United States) J Capriati (Netherlands) B Schultz	7^{9}	4	1
(Poland) R Baranski (South Africa) Lisa Seemann	6	6
(United States) L Glitz (United States) Susan Sommerville	3	2
(Soviet Union) E Brioukhovets (Czechoslovakia) E Švíglerová	4	1
4	(United States) MJ Fernández (United States) Z Garrison	6	6
(Australia) N Provis (Australia) E Smylie	2	6	6
(Canada) J Hetherington (United States) K Rinaldi	6	4	3
(United States) G Magers (United States) R White	6	4	4
2	(United States) P Shriver (Soviet Union) N Zvereva	4	6	6

Quarterfinals
1	(Czechoslovakia) J Novotná (Soviet Union) L Savchenko	6	6
(United States) A Frazier (United States) G Helgeson	2	1
3	(Spain) A Sánchez Vicario (Czechoslovakia) H Suková	6	6
(United States) P Harper (Spain) C Martínez	0	1
(Poland) R Baranski (South Africa) Lisa Seemann	2	2
4	(United States) MJ Fernández (United States) Z Garrison	6	6
(Australia) N Provis (Australia) E Smylie	6	4	6
2	(United States) P Shriver (Soviet Union) N Zvereva	4	6	2

Semifinals
1	(Czechoslovakia) J Novotná (Soviet Union) L Savchenko	6	4	6
3	(Spain) A Sánchez Vicario (Czechoslovakia) H Suková	4	6	2
4	(United States) MJ Fernández (United States) Z Garrison	4	6	6
(Australia) N Provis (Australia) E Smylie	6	1	1

Final
1	(Czechoslovakia) J Novotná (Soviet Union) L Savchenko	6	6
4	(United States) MJ Fernández (United States) Z Garrison	2	4
