= 1992 Virginia Slims of Philadelphia – Doubles =

Doubles
- 1992 Virginia Slims of Philadelphia

Final
- Champions: (United States) Gigi Fernández (Commonwealth of Independent States) Natasha Zvereva
- Runners-up: (Spain) Conchita Martínez (France) Mary Pierce
- Score: 6–1, 6–3

Details
- Draw: 14 (1WC)
- Seeds: 4

Events
Singles	Doubles
← 1991 ·	Advanta Championships of Philadelphia	· 1993 →

Jana Novotná and Larisa Savchenko-Neiland were the defending champions, but Novotná did not compete this year. Savchenko-Neiland teamed up with Zina Garrison and lost in the semifinals to Gigi Fernández and Natasha Zvereva.

Fernández and Zvereva won the title by defeating Conchita Martínez and Mary Pierce 6–1, 6–3 in the final.

== Seeds ==
The top two seeds received a bye to the quarterfinals.

1. (Spain) Arantxa Sánchez Vicario / (United States) Pam Shriver (quarterfinals)
2. (United States) Gigi Fernández / (Commonwealth of Independent States) Natasha Zvereva (champions)
3. (United States) Zina Garrison / (Latvia) Larisa Savchenko-Neiland (semifinals)
4. (Canada) Jill Hetherington / (United States) Kathy Rinaldi (quarterfinals)

== Draw ==
=== Key ===
- Q = Qualifier
- WC = Wild card
- LL = Lucky loser
- Alt = Alternate
- SE = Special exempt
- PR = Protected ranking
- ITF = ITF entry
- JE = Junior exempt
- w/o = Walkover
- r = Retired
- d = Defaulted
- SR = Special ranking

=== Draw ===
First round
(Spain) C Martínez (France) M Pierce	6	6
(United States) L Glitz (United States) C Kuhlman	3	0
4	(Canada) J Hetherington (United States) K Rinaldi	6^{7}	6	6
WC	(South Africa) R Fairbank-Nideffer (United States) B Nagelsen	7^{9}	4	2
(United States) L Raymond (United States) S Stafford	6	6
(United States) P O'Reilly (United States) Terri O'Reilly	4	3
(United States) E Burgin (South Africa) M de Swardt	6	6
(United States) B Bowes (France) N Herreman	4	3
(Commonwealth of Independent States) E Brioukhovets (United States) A Grossman	1	5
3	(United States) Z Garrison (Latvia) L Savchenko-Neiland	6	7
(South Africa) A Coetzer (United States) Ca MacGregor	4	5
(United States) L McNeil (Netherlands) B Schultz	6	7

Quarterfinals
1	(Spain) A Sánchez Vicario (United States) P Shriver	2	6	3
(Spain) C Martínez (France) M Pierce	6	1	6
4	(Canada) J Hetherington (United States) K Rinaldi	2	4
(United States) L Raymond (United States) S Stafford	6	6
(United States) E Burgin (South Africa) M de Swardt	5	2
3	(United States) Z Garrison (Latvia) L Savchenko-Neiland	7	6
(United States) L McNeil (Netherlands) B Schultz	6^{6}	2
2	(United States) G Fernández (Commonwealth of Independent States) N Zvereva	7^{8}	6

Semifinals
(Spain) C Martínez (France) M Pierce	3	6	6
(United States) L Raymond (United States) S Stafford	6	3	1
3	(United States) Z Garrison (Latvia) L Savchenko-Neiland	3	6^{5}
2	(United States) G Fernández (Commonwealth of Independent States) N Zvereva	6	7^{7}

Final
(Spain) C Martínez (France) M Pierce	1	3
2	(United States) G Fernández (Commonwealth of Independent States) N Zvereva	6	6
