= 1978 Virginia Slims of Philadelphia – Doubles =

Doubles
- 1978 Virginia Slims of Philadelphia

Final
- Champions: (Australia) Kerry Reid (Australia) Wendy Turnbull
- Runners-up: (France) Françoise Dürr (United Kingdom) Virginia Wade
- Score: 6–3, 7–5

Details
- Draw: 14
- Seeds: 4

Events
| Singles | Doubles |
| ← 1977 · | Advanta Championships of Philadelphia | · 1979 → |

Françoise Dürr and Virginia Wade were the defending champions, but lost in the final to Kerry Reid and Wendy Turnbull. The score was 6–3, 7–5.

== Seeds ==
1. (Australia) Kerry Reid / (Australia) Wendy Turnbull (champions)
2. (United States) Kristien Shaw / (United States) Janet Newberry (semifinals)
3. (France) Françoise Dürr / (United Kingdom) Virginia Wade (final)
4. (United States) Rosemary Casals / (United States) JoAnne Russell (semifinals)

== Draw ==
=== Key ===
- Q = Qualifier
- WC = Wild card
- LL = Lucky loser
- Alt = Alternate
- SE = Special exempt
- PR = Protected ranking
- ITF = ITF entry
- JE = Junior exempt
- w/o = Walkover
- r = Retired
- d = Defaulted
- SR = Special ranking

=== Draw ===
First round
1 | (Australia) K Reid (Australia) W Turnbull | 6 | 6
(United Kingdom) G Coles (United States) Z Liess | 4 | 1
(United States) B Potter (West Germany) R Tomanová | 6^{2} | 2
(United States) L Antonoplis (United States) P Teeguarden | 7^{5} | 6
4 | (United States) R Casals (United States) J Russell | 6 | 6
(Sweden) H Anliot (Czechoslovakia) R Maršíková | 4 | 3
(United States) L duPont (United States) K May | 7 | 6
(United Kingdom) M Tyler (South Africa) Y Vermaak | 5 | 4
(West Germany) K Ebbinghaus (Romania) F Mihai | 2 | 0
3 | (France) F Dürr (United Kingdom) V Wade | 6 | 6
(Australia) D Fromholtz (Australia) L Hunt | 2 | 5
(Socialist Federal Republic of Yugoslavia) M Jaušovec (Romania) V Ruzici | 6 | 7

Quarterfinals
1 | (Australia) K Reid (Australia) W Turnbull | 6 | 6
(United States) L Antonoplis (United States) P Teeguarden | 4 | 2
4 | (United States) R Casals (United States) J Russell | 6 | 3 | 7
(United States) T Austin (Netherlands) B Stöve | 3 | 6 | 5
(United States) L duPont (United States) K May | 6 | 0 | 4
3 | (France) F Dürr (United Kingdom) V Wade | 2 | 6 | 6
(Socialist Federal Republic of Yugoslavia) M Jaušovec (Romania) V Ruzici | 6 | 2 | 6
2 | (United States) J Newberry (United States) K Shaw | 4 | 6 | 7

Semifinals
1 | (Australia) K Reid (Australia) W Turnbull | 6 | 6
4 | (United States) R Casals (United States) J Russell | 4 | 3
3 | (France) F Dürr (United Kingdom) V Wade | 6 | 7
2 | (United States) J Newberry (United States) K Shaw | 4 | 5

Final
1 | (Australia) K Reid (Australia) W Turnbull | 6 | 7
3 | (France) F Dürr (United Kingdom) V Wade | 3 | 5
