= 2000 Advanta Championships – Singles =

Singles
- 2000 Advanta Championships

Final
- Champion: (United States) Lindsay Davenport
- Runner-up: (Switzerland) Martina Hingis
- Score: 7–6^{(9–7)}, 6–4

Details
- Draw: 28 (3WC/4Q/5LL)
- Seeds: 8

Events
Singles	Doubles
← 1999 ·	Advanta Championships of Philadelphia	· 2003 →

Lindsay Davenport was the defending champion, and successfully defended her title, by defeating Martina Hingis 7–6^{(9–7)}, 6–4 in the final.

== Seeds ==
The first four seeds received a bye into the second round.

1. (Switzerland) Martina Hingis (final)
2. (United States) Lindsay Davenport (champion)
3. (Spain) Conchita Martínez (semifinals)
4. (France) Nathalie Tauziat (semifinals)
5. (Spain) ~~Arantxa Sánchez Vicario~~ (withdrew)
6. (Russia) Anna Kournikova (quarterfinals)
7. (South Africa) Amanda Coetzer (quarterfinals)
8. (United States) Jennifer Capriati (second round)
9. (United States) Chanda Rubin (second round, withdrew)

== Draw ==
=== Key ===
- Q = Qualifier
- WC = Wild card
- LL = Lucky loser
- Alt = Alternate
- SE = Special exempt
- PR = Protected ranking
- ITF = ITF entry
- JE = Junior exempt
- w/o = Walkover
- r = Retired
- d = Defaulted
- SR = Special ranking

=== Finals ===
Semifinals
1	(Switzerland) Martina Hingis	6	6
4	(France) Nathalie Tauziat	1	2
3	(Spain) Conchita Martínez	0	1
2	(United States) Lindsay Davenport	6	6

Final
1	(Switzerland) Martina Hingis	6^{7}	4
2	(United States) Lindsay Davenport	7^{9}	6

=== Top half ===
First round
WC	(Russia) E Bovina	6	6
LL	(United States) K Schlukebir	2	2
(Australia) N Pratt	6	7
(Japan) A Sugiyama	2	5
Q	(United States) M Washington	2	0
6	(Russia) A Kournikova	6	6
WC	(Slovakia) D Hantuchová	6
WC	(United States) A Stevenson	3	r
Q	(Germany) G Arn	1	1
(France) J Halard-Decugis	6	6
(United States) M Shaughnessy	6	5	4
8	(United States) J Capriati	3	7	6

Second round
1	(Switzerland) M Hingis	6	6
WC	(Russia) E Bovina	4	1
(Australia) N Pratt	0	2
6	(Russia) A Kournikova	6	6
4	(France) N Tauziat	7	6
WC	(Slovakia) D Hantuchová	5	4
(France) J Halard-Decugis	6	6
8	(United States) J Capriati	4	1

Quarterfinals
1	(Switzerland) M Hingis	6	6
6	(Russia) A Kournikova	4	0
4	(France) N Tauziat	6	6
(France) J Halard-Decugis	4	4

Semifinals
1	(Switzerland) M Hingis	6	6
4	(France) N Tauziat	1	2

=== Bottom half ===
First round
9	(United States) C Rubin	2	6	6
(United States) A Frazier	6	2	3
(United States) K Brandi	1	3
LL	(United States) H Parkinson	6	6
LL	(Canada) R Kolbovic	6	7
Q	(Switzerland) MG Mikaelian	4	5
7	(South Africa) A Coetzer	6	6
LL	(United States) E deLone	2	3
LL	(United States) J Hopkins	6	4	6
(United States) L Osterloh	1	6	1
(United States) L Raymond	6	6
Q	(Germany) V Henke	4	4

Second round
9	(United States) C Rubin
LL	(United States) H Parkinson	w/o
LL	(Canada) R Kolbovic	1	3
3	(Spain) C Martínez	6	6
7	(South Africa) A Coetzer	6	6
LL	(United States) J Hopkins	3	0
(United States) L Raymond	3	3
2	(United States) L Davenport	6	6

Quarterfinals
LL	(United States) H Parkinson	2	0
3	(Spain) C Martínez	6	6
7	(South Africa) A Coetzer	1	6	1
2	(United States) L Davenport	6	1	6

Semifinals
3	(Spain) C Martínez	0	1
2	(United States) L Davenport	6	6
