= Advanta Championships =

Advanta Championships may refer to:

- U.S. Pro Indoor, a defunct men's tennis tournament held in Philadelphia, known as the Advanta Championships from 1997 to 1998
- Advanta Championships Philadelphia, a defunct women's tennis tournament held in Philadelphia, known as the Advanta Championships from 1995 to 2005
