= 2004 Advanta Championships =

- Date: November 1–7
- Edition: 20th
- Category: Tier II
- Draw: 28S / 16D
- Prize money: $585,000
- Surface: Hard / indoor
- Location: Philadelphia, PA, U.S.
- Venue: The Pavilion

Champions

Singles
- (France) Amélie Mauresmo

Doubles
- (Australia) Alicia Molik / (United States) Lisa Raymond
- Championships of Philadelphia

The 2004 Advanta Championships was a tennis tournament played on indoor hard courts at The Pavilion in Villanova, Philadelphia, Pennsylvania in the United States that was part of Tier II of the 2004 WTA Tour. It was the 20th edition of the tournament and was held from November 1 through November 7, 2004. First-seeded Amélie Mauresmo won her second consecutive singles title and earned $93,000 first-prize money.

== Finals ==
=== Singles ===
(France) Amélie Mauresmo defeated (Russia) Vera Zvonareva 3–6, 6–2, 6–2

- It was Mauresmo's 5th singles title of the year and the 15th of her career.

=== Doubles ===
(Australia) Alicia Molik / (United States) Lisa Raymond defeated (South Africa) Liezel Huber / (Australia) Corina Morariu 7–5, 6–4
