= 1992 Virginia Slims of Philadelphia – Singles =

Singles
- 1992 Virginia Slims of Philadelphia

Final
- Champion: (West Germany) Steffi Graf
- Runner-up: (Spain) Arantxa Sánchez Vicario
- Score: 6–3, 3–6, 6–1

Details
- Draw: 28 (2WC)
- Seeds: 8

Events
Singles	Doubles
← 1991 ·	Advanta Championships of Philadelphia	· 1993 →

Monica Seles was the defending champion, but chose to rest in order to compete at the Virginia Slims Championships the following week.

Steffi Graf won the title by defeating Arantxa Sánchez Vicario 6–3, 3–6, 6–1 in the final.

== Seeds ==
The top four seeds received a bye to the second round.

1. (Germany) Steffi Graf (champion)
2. (Argentina) Gabriela Sabatini (semifinals)
3. (Spain) Arantxa Sánchez Vicario (final)
4. (United States) Jennifer Capriati (semifinals)
5. (Spain) Conchita Martínez (quarterfinals)
6. (France) Mary Pierce (second round)
7. (United States) Amy Frazier (second round)
8. (United States) Lori McNeil (quarterfinals)

== Draw ==
=== Key ===
- Q = Qualifier
- WC = Wild card
- LL = Lucky loser
- Alt = Alternate
- SE = Special exempt
- PR = Protected ranking
- ITF = ITF entry
- JE = Junior exempt
- w/o = Walkover
- r = Retired
- d = Defaulted
- SR = Special ranking

=== Finals ===
Semifinals
1	(Germany) Steffi Graf	6	6
4	(United States) Jennifer Capriati	0	1
3	(Spain) Arantxa Sánchez Vicario	4	6	6
2	(Argentina) Gabriela Sabatini	6	3	2

Final
1	(Germany) Steffi Graf	6	3	6
3	(Spain) Arantxa Sánchez Vicario	3	6	1

=== Top half ===
First round
(Commonwealth of Independent States) E Brioukhovets	6	6
(Canada) J Hetherington	2	0
(United States) Z Garrison	7^{7}	7^{7}
(Netherlands) B Schultz	6^{3}	6^{5}
(France) N Herreman	4	1
5	(Spain) C Martínez	6	6
(United States) R White	2	2
(United States) E Burgin	6	6
(United States) G Fernández	7	6
(Latvia) L Savchenko-Neiland	5	4
(United States) A Grossman	2	1
8	(United States) L McNeil	6	6

Second round
1	(Germany) S Graf	6	6
(Commonwealth of Independent States) E Brioukhovets	0	1
(United States) Z Garrison	6	3	4
5	(Spain) C Martínez	4	6	6
4	(United States) J Capriati	6	6
(United States) E Burgin	2	0
(United States) G Fernández	2	5
8	(United States) L McNeil	6	7

Quarterfinals
1	(Germany) S Graf	6	6
5	(Spain) C Martínez	1	1
4	(United States) J Capriati	6	6
8	(United States) L McNeil	2	1

Semifinals
1	(Germany) S Graf	6	6
4	(United States) J Capriati	0	1

=== Bottom half ===
First round
6	(France) M Pierce	6	6
(United States) K Rinaldi	0	1
(South Africa) R Fairbank-Nideffer	2	5
(Commonwealth of Independent States) N Zvereva	6	7
(South Africa) A Coetzer	6
(United States) S Stafford	1	r
7	(United States) A Frazier	6	6
(United States) C Kuhlman	1	3
WC	(United States) L Raymond	6	6
(United States) B Bowes	1	3
(United States) P Shriver	6	6
WC	(United States) B Nagelsen	1	4

Second round
6	(France) M Pierce	6^{4}	2
(Commonwealth of Independent States) N Zvereva	7^{7}	6
(South Africa) A Coetzer	6^{5}	6^{3}
3	(Spain) A Sánchez Vicario	7^{7}	7^{7}
7	(United States) A Frazier	4	4
WC	(United States) L Raymond	6	6
(United States) P Shriver	6^{4}	5
2	(Argentina) G Sabatini	7^{7}	7

Quarterfinals
(Commonwealth of Independent States) N Zvereva	2	1
3	(Spain) A Sánchez Vicario	6	6
WC	(United States) L Raymond	4	6^{2}
2	(Argentina) G Sabatini	6	7^{7}

Semifinals
3	(Spain) A Sánchez Vicario	4	6	6
2	(Argentina) G Sabatini	6	3	2
