= 1992 Virginia Slims of Philadelphia =

Tennis tournament

- Date: November 9–15
- Edition: 10th
- Category: Tier II
- Draw: 28S / 14D
- Prize money: $350,000
- Surface: Carpet / indoor
- Location: Philadelphia, PA, U.S.
- Venue: Philadelphia Civic Center

Champions

Singles
- (Germany) Steffi Graf

Doubles
- (United States) Gigi Fernández / (Commonwealth of Independent States) Natasha Zvereva
| ← 1991 · | Virginia Slims of Philadelphia | · 1993 → |

The 1992 Virginia Slims of Philadelphia was a women's tennis tournament played on indoor carpet courts at the Philadelphia Civic Center in Philadelphia, Pennsylvania in the United States that was part of the Tier II category of the 1992 WTA Tour. It was the 10th edition of the tournament and was held from November 9 through November 15, 1992. First-seeded Steffi Graf won the singles title and earned $70,000 first-prize money.

== Finals ==
=== Singles ===
(Germany) Steffi Graf defeated (Spain) Arantxa Sánchez Vicario 6–3, 3–6, 6–1

- It was Graf's 8th singles title of the year and the 69th of her career.

=== Doubles ===
(United States) Gigi Fernández / (Commonwealth of Independent States) Natasha Zvereva defeated (Spain) Conchita Martínez / (France) Mary Pierce 6–1, 6–3
