= 1993 Virginia Slims of Philadelphia – Singles =

Singles
- 1993 Virginia Slims of Philadelphia

Final
- Champion: (Spain) Conchita Martínez
- Runner-up: (Germany) Steffi Graf
- Score: 6–3, 6–3

Details
- Draw: 32
- Seeds: 8

Events
Singles	Doubles
← 1992 ·	Advanta Championships of Philadelphia	· 1994 →

Conchita Martínez defeated the defending champion Steffi Graf in the final, 6–3, 6–3 to win the singles tennis title at the 1993 Virginia Slims of Philadelphia.

== Seeds ==
1. (Germany) Steffi Graf (final)
2. (Spain) Conchita Martínez (champion)
3. (United States) Mary Joe Fernández (first round)
4. (Argentina) Gabriela Sabatini (quarterfinals)
5. (Czech Republic) Helena Suková (first round)
6. (France) Mary Pierce (second round)
7. (South Africa) Amanda Coetzer (quarterfinals)
8. (Belarus) Natasha Zvereva (quarterfinals)

== Draw ==
=== Key ===
- Q = Qualifier
- WC = Wild card
- LL = Lucky loser
- Alt = Alternate
- SE = Special exempt
- PR = Protected ranking
- ITF = ITF entry
- JE = Junior exempt
- w/o = Walkover
- r = Retired
- d = Defaulted
- SR = Special ranking

=== Finals ===
Semifinals
1	(Germany) Steffi Graf	6	6
(United States) Kimberly Po	3	1
(United States) Amy Frazier	2	4
2	(Spain) Conchita Martínez	6	6

Final
1	(Germany) Steffi Graf	3	3
2	(Spain) Conchita Martínez	6	6

=== Top half ===
First round
1	(Germany) S Graf	6	6
(United States) D Graham	2	0
(Netherlands) B Schultz	6	4	4
(United States) P Shriver	3	6	6
Q	(United States) A Henricksson	6	6
LL	(Germany) P Begerow	3	4
(France) N Tauziat	3	7^{7}	3
7	(South Africa) A Coetzer	6	6^{4}	6
3	(United States) MJ Fernández	4	1
(United States) Z Garrison-Jackson	6	6
(Latvia) L Neiland	4	4
(United States) L McNeil	6	6
(United States) M Werdel	5	6	7^{9}
Q	(United States) T Whitlinger	7	3	6^{7}
(United States) K Po	7^{7}	6
5	(Czech Republic) H Suková	6^{0}	4

Second round
1	(Germany) S Graf	6	6
(United States) P Shriver	1	3
Q	(United States) A Henricksson	6	4	6^{5}
7	(South Africa) A Coetzer	4	6	7^{7}
(United States) Z Garrison-Jackson	6	6
(United States) L McNeil	3	1
(United States) M Werdel	1	6	3
(United States) K Po	6	4	6

Quarterfinals
1	(Germany) S Graf	6	6
7	(South Africa) A Coetzer	4	1
(United States) Z Garrison-Jackson	2	4
(United States) K Po	6	6

Semifinals
1	(Germany) S Graf	6	6
(United States) K Po	3	1

=== Bottom half ===
First round
6	(France) M Pierce	6	7
(Croatia) I Majoli	0	5
(United States) G Fernández	3	2
(United States) A Frazier	6	6
Q	(United States) N Arendt	6	5	4
(United States) L Davenport	3	7	6
(Mexico) A Gavaldón	2	1
4	(Argentina) G Sabatini	6	6
8	(Belarus) N Zvereva	6	7^{7}
WC	(United States) A Miller	1	6^{4}
WC	(United States) T Austin	6	1	4
(United States) A Grossman	4	6	6
(United States) L Raymond	6	6
Q	(United States) C Rubin	4	0
(United States) G Helgeson	4	1^{r}
2	(Spain) C Martínez	6	3

Second round
6	(France) M Pierce	6^{9}	4
(United States) A Frazier	7^{11}	6
(United States) L Davenport	4	2
4	(Argentina) G Sabatini	6	6
8	(Belarus) N Zvereva	6	6
(United States) A Grossman	4	0
(United States) L Raymond	6	3	5
2	(Spain) C Martínez	4	6	7

Quarterfinals
(United States) A Frazier	2	6	7
4	(Argentina) G Sabatini	6	3	5
8	(Belarus) N Zvereva	4	4
2	(Spain) C Martínez	6	6

Semifinals
(United States) A Frazier	2	4
2	(Spain) C Martínez	6	6
