= 2003 Advanta Championships – Doubles =

Doubles
- 2003 Advanta Championships

Final
- Champions: (United States) Martina Navratilova (United States) Lisa Raymond
- Runners-up: (Zimbabwe) Cara Black (Australia) Rennae Stubbs
- Score: 6–3, 6–4

Details
- Draw: 16
- Seeds: 4

Events
Singles	Doubles
- Advanta Championships of Philadelphia

The tournament wasn't played last year, no defending champions were declared. Martina Hingis and Anna Kournikova were the last champions at the 2000 edition, but none competed this year. Eventually, Hingis retired from professional tennis in February 2003, while Kournikova played her last professional match in April 2003, losing to Conchita Martínez at Charleston due to an injury.

The first-seeded team of Martina Navratilova and Lisa Raymond won the title by defeating Cara Black and Rennae Stubbs 6–3, 6–4 in the final.

== Seeds ==
1. (United States) Martina Navratilova / (United States) Lisa Raymond (champions)
2. (South Africa) Liezel Huber / (Japan) Ai Sugiyama (semifinals)
3. (Zimbabwe) Cara Black / (Australia) Rennae Stubbs (final)
4. (Australia) Nicole Pratt / (United States) Meghann Shaughnessy (semifinals)

== Draw ==
Key

- Q = Qualifier
- WC = Wild card
- LL = Lucky loser
- Alt = Alternate
- ITF = ITF entry
- PR = Protected ranking
- SR = Special ranking
- SE = Special exempt
- JE = Junior exempt
- JR = Junior Accelerator Programme entrant
- CO = College Accelerator Programme entrant
- NG = Next Gen Accelerator Program entrant
- w/o = Walkover
- r = Retired
- d = Defaulted

=== Draw ===
First round
1	(United States) M Navratilova (United States) L Raymond	6	6
(Germany) A Bachmann (Germany) S Klösel	3	2
WC	(United States) A Haynes (United States) S Perry	4	6	5
(Bulgaria) D Krastevitch (Bulgaria) S Krivencheva	6	1	7
4	(Australia) N Pratt (United States) M Shaughnessy	6	7^{7}
(United States) B Mattek (United States) L Osterloh	3	6^{4}
(Chinese Taipei) J Lee (Germany) M Weingärtner	6	6
(Romania) A Vanc (Czech Republic) R Voráčová	2	2
(United States) T Ashley (United States) A Harkleroad	7^{7}	6
Q	(Slovakia) J Gajdošová (Germany) AL Grönefeld	6^{5}	1
(Hungary) A Kapros (Slovenia) P Rampre	2	4
3	(Zimbabwe) C Black (Australia) R Stubbs	6	6
(Russia) E Likhovtseva (Russia) V Zvonareva	6	6
(Canada) S Jeyaseelan (Croatia) S Talaja	4	3
(Italy) T Garbin (Paraguay) R de los Ríos	3	0
2	(South Africa) L Huber (Japan) A Sugiyama	6	6

Quarterfinals
1	(United States) M Navratilova (United States) L Raymond	7	6
(Bulgaria) D Krastevitch (Bulgaria) S Krivencheva	5	2
4	(Australia) N Pratt (United States) M Shaughnessy	7	6
(Chinese Taipei) J Lee (Germany) M Weingärtner	5	4
(United States) T Ashley (United States) A Harkleroad	3	1
3	(Zimbabwe) C Black (Australia) R Stubbs	6	6
(Russia) E Likhovtseva (Russia) V Zvonareva	2	1
2	(South Africa) L Huber (Japan) A Sugiyama	6	6

Semifinals
1	(United States) M Navratilova (United States) L Raymond	6	6
4	(Australia) N Pratt (United States) M Shaughnessy	4	2
3	(Zimbabwe) C Black (Australia) R Stubbs	7	5	6
2	(South Africa) L Huber (Japan) A Sugiyama	5	7	3

Final
1	(United States) M Navratilova (United States) L Raymond	6	6
3	(Zimbabwe) C Black (Australia) R Stubbs	3	4
