= 1998 Advanta Championships of Philadelphia =

Tennis tournament

- Date: November 9–15
- Edition: 16th
- Category: Tier II
- Draw: 28S / 16D
- Prize money: $450,000
- Surface: Carpet / Indoor
- Location: Philadelphia, PA, U.S.
- Venue: Philadelphia Civic Center

Champions

Singles
- (Germany) Steffi Graf

Doubles
- (Russia) Elena Likhovtseva / (Japan) Ai Sugiyama
- Championships of Philadelphia

The 1998 Advanta Championships of Philadelphia was a women's tennis tournament played on indoor carpet courts at the Philadelphia Civic Center in Philadelphia, Pennsylvania in the United States that was part of Tier II of the 1998 WTA Tour. The tournament was held from November 9 through November 15, 1998. Unseeded Steffi Graf won the singles title and earned $79,000 first-prize money.

== Finals ==
=== Singles ===
(Germany) Steffi Graf defeated (United States) Lindsay Davenport 4–6, 6–3, 6–4

- It was Graf's 3rd singles title of the year and the 106th of her career.

=== Doubles ===
(Russia) Elena Likhovtseva / (Japan) Ai Sugiyama defeated (United States) Monica Seles / (Belarus) Natasha Zvereva 7–5, 4–6, 6–2

- It was Likhovtseva's 4th title of the year and the 6th of her career. It was Sugiyama's 6th title of the year and the 10th of her career.
