= 1974 Virginia Slims of Philadelphia =

- Date: April 22–28
- Edition: 3rd
- Category: Virginia Slims circuit
- Draw: 32S / 16D
- Prize money: $50,000
- Surface: Carpet (Sportface) / indoor
- Location: Philadelphia, Pennsylvania, U.S.
- Venue: Palestra

Champions

Singles
- (Soviet Union) Olga Morozova

Doubles
- (United States) Rosemary Casals (United States) Billie Jean King
← 1973 ·	Virginia Slims of Philadelphia	· 1975 →

The 1974 Virginia Slims of Philadelphia was a women's tennis tournament played on indoor carpet courts at the Palestra in Philadelphia, Pennsylvania in the United States that was part of the 1974 Virginia Slims World Championship Series. It was the third edition of the tournament and was held from April 22 through April 28, 1974. Seventh-seeded Olga Morozova won the singles title and earned (Note: Morozova had to hand the prize money over to the Russian Tennis Federation.) $10,000 first-prize money.

== Finals ==
=== Singles ===
(Soviet Union) Olga Morozova defeated (United States) Billie Jean King 7–6^{(5–2)}, 6–1

=== Doubles ===
(United States) Rosemary Casals / (United States) Billie Jean King defeated (Australia) Kerry Harris / (Australia) Lesley Hunt 6–3, 7–6

== Prize money ==
Event	W	F	3rd	4th	QF	Round of 16	Round of 32
Singles	$10,000	$5,600	$3,000	$2,600	$1,400	$700	$350
