= 1997 Advanta Championships of Philadelphia =

- Date: November 10–16
- Edition: 15th
- Category: Tier II
- Draw: 28S /16D
- Prize money: $450,000
- Surface: Carpet / indoor
- Location: Villanova, PA, US

Champions

Singles
- (Switzerland) Martina Hingis

Doubles
- (United States) Lisa Raymond / (Australia) Rennae Stubbs
- Championships of Philadelphia

The 1997 Advanta Championships of Philadelphia was a women's tennis tournament played on indoor carpet courts at the Villanova University Pavilion in Villanova, Pennsylvania in the United States that was part of the Tier II category of the 1997 WTA Tour. It was the 15th edition of the tournament and was held from November 10 through November 16, 1997. First-seeded Martina Hingis won the singles title.

== Finals ==
=== Singles ===
(Switzerland) Martina Hingis defeated (United States) Lindsay Davenport 7–5, 6–7^{(7–9)}, 7–6^{(7–4)}

- It was Hingis' 12th and last singles title of the year and the 14th of her career.

=== Doubles ===
(United States) Lisa Raymond / (Australia) Rennae Stubbs defeated (United States) Lindsay Davenport / (Czech Republic) Jana Novotná 6–3, 7–5

- It was Raymond's 2nd and last doubles title of the year and the 7th of her career. It was Stubbs' 2nd and last doubles title of the year and the 13th of her career.
