= 2005 Advanta Championships =

- Date: October 31 – November 6
- Edition: 21st
- Category: Tier II
- Draw: 28S / 16D
- Prize money: $585,000
- Surface: Hard / indoor
- Location: Philadelphia, PA, U.S.
- Venue: The Pavilion

Champions

Singles
- (France) Amélie Mauresmo

Doubles
- (Zimbabwe) Cara Black / (Australia) Rennae Stubbs
- Championships of Philadelphia

The 2005 Advanta Championships was a women's tennis tournament played on indoor hard courts at The Pavilion in Villanova, Philadelphia, Pennsylvania in the United States that was part of Tier II of the 2005 WTA Tour. It was the 21st and last edition of the tournament and was held from October 31 through November 6, 2005. Third-seeded Amélie Mauresmo won her third consecutive singles title and earned $93,000 first-prize money.

== Finals ==
=== Singles ===
(France) Amélie Mauresmo defeated (Russia) Elena Dementieva 7–5, 2–6, 7–5

- It was Mauresmo's 4th singles title of the year and the 18th of her career.

=== Doubles ===
(Zimbabwe) Cara Black / (Australia) Rennae Stubbs defeated (United States) Lisa Raymond / (Australia) Samantha Stosur 6–4, 7–6^{(7–4)}
