= 1991 Virginia Slims of Philadelphia =

- Date: November 11–17
- Edition: 9th
- Category: Tier II
- Draw: 28S / 16D
- Prize money: $350,000
- Surface: Carpet / indoor
- Location: Philadelphia, PA, U.S.
- Venue: Philadelphia Civic Center

Champions

Singles
- (Socialist Federal Republic of Yugoslavia) Monica Seles

Doubles
- (Czechoslovakia) Jana Novotná / (Soviet Union) Larisa Savchenko
← 1979 ·	Virginia Slims of Philadelphia	· 1992 →

The 1991 Virginia Slims of Philadelphia was a women's tennis tournament played on indoor carpet courts at the Philadelphia Civic Center in Philadelphia, Pennsylvania in the United States that was part of the Tier II category of the 1991 WTA Tour. It was the ninth edition of the tournament and was held from November 11 through November 17, 1991. First-seeded Monica Seles won the singles title and earned $70,000 first-prize money.

== Finals ==
=== Singles ===
(Socialist Federal Republic of Yugoslavia) Monica Seles defeated (United States) Jennifer Capriati 7–5, 6–1

- It was Seles' 9th singles title of the year and the 19th of her career.

=== Doubles ===
(Czechoslovakia) Jana Novotná / (Soviet Union) Larisa Savchenko defeated (United States) Mary Joe Fernández / (United States) Zina Garrison 6–2, 6–4
