= 2005 Advanta Championships – Doubles =

Doubles
- 2005 Advanta Championships

Final
- Champion: (Zimbabwe) Cara Black (Australia) Rennae Stubbs
- Runner-up: (United States) Lisa Raymond (Australia) Samantha Stosur
- Score: 6–4, 7–6^{(7–4)}

Details
- Draw: 16
- Seeds: 4

Events
Singles	Doubles
- Advanta Championships of Philadelphia

Alicia Molik and Lisa Raymond were the defending champions, but Molik chose not to compete in 2005; Raymond played alongside Samantha Stosur, but lost in the final.

Cara Black and Rennae Stubbs emerged as the winners.

== Seeds ==
1. (Zimbabwe) Cara Black / (Australia) Rennae Stubbs (winners)
2. (United States) Lisa Raymond / (Australia) Samantha Stosur (final)
3. (Russia) Elena Likhovtseva / (Russia) Vera Zvonareva (semifinals)
4. (United States) Corina Morariu / (Czech Republic) Květa Peschke (quarterfinals)

== Results ==
Key

- Q = Qualifier
- WC = Wild card
- LL = Lucky loser
- Alt = Alternate
- ITF = ITF entry
- PR = Protected ranking
- SR = Special ranking
- SE = Special exempt
- JE = Junior exempt
- JR = Junior Accelerator Programme entrant
- CO = College Accelerator Programme entrant
- NG = Next Gen Accelerator Program entrant
- w/o = Walkover
- r = Retired
- d = Defaulted

=== Draw ===
First round
1	(Zimbabwe) C Black (Australia) R Stubbs	6	6
(Australia) N Pratt (United States) M Shaughnessy	4	1
(United States) A Haynes (United States) B Mattek	6	6
(Austria) D Klemenschits (Austria) S Klemenschits	2	1
4	(United States) C Morariu (Czech Republic) K Peschke	6	1	7
(Czech Republic) I Benešová (Slovakia) K Kachlíková	1	6	6^{7}
(United States) J Ditty (Czech Republic) H Šromová	6	1	2
WC	(Canada) M Drake (Czech Republic) N Vaidišová	2	6	6
(Ukraine) Y Fedak (Belarus) T Poutchek	5	6	3
Q	(Brazil) MF Alves (United States) A Rolle	7	3	6
(United States) J Craybas (Germany) J Wöhr	1	2
3	(Russia) E Likhovtseva (Russia) V Zvonareva	6	6
(Germany) M Müller (Czech Republic) V Uhlířová	6	1	1
(United States) C Gullickson (United States) J Russell	1	6	6
(Russia) G Voskoboeva (United States) M Washington	3	4
2	(United States) L Raymond (Australia) S Stosur	6	6

Quarterfinals
1	(Zimbabwe) C Black (Australia) R Stubbs	6	6
(United States) A Haynes (United States) B Mattek	3	2
4	(United States) C Morariu (Czech Republic) K Peschke	2	4
WC	(Canada) M Drake (Czech Republic) N Vaidišová	6	6
Q	(Brazil) MF Alves (United States) A Rolle	2	4
3	(Russia) E Likhovtseva (Russia) V Zvonareva	6	6
(United States) C Gullickson (United States) J Russell	2	3
2	(United States) L Raymond (Australia) S Stosur	6	6

Semifinals
1	(Zimbabwe) C Black (Australia) R Stubbs	6	6
WC	(Canada) M Drake (Czech Republic) N Vaidišová	3	4
3	(Russia) E Likhovtseva (Russia) V Zvonareva	5	3
2	(United States) L Raymond (Australia) S Stosur	7	6

Final
1	(Zimbabwe) C Black (Australia) R Stubbs	6	7
2	(United States) L Raymond (Australia) S Stosur	4	6^{4}
