= 2000 Advanta Championships – Doubles =

Doubles
- 2000 Advanta Championships

Final
- Champions: (Switzerland) Martina Hingis (Russia) Anna Kournikova
- Runners-up: (United States) Lisa Raymond (Australia) Rennae Stubbs
- Score: 6–2, 7–5

Details
- Draw: 16 (1WC/1Q)
- Seeds: 4

Events
Singles	Doubles
- Advanta Championships of Philadelphia

Lisa Raymond and Rennae Stubbs were the defending champions, but lost in the final to Martina Hingis and Anna Kournikova. The score was 6–2, 7–5 in the final.

== Seeds ==
1. (France) Julie Halard-Decugis / (Japan) Ai Sugiyama (semifinals)
2. (Switzerland) Martina Hingis / (Russia) Anna Kournikova (champions)
3. (United States) Lisa Raymond / (Australia) Rennae Stubbs (final)
4. (France) Alexandra Fusai / (France) Nathalie Tauziat (semifinals)

== Draw ==
Key

- Q = Qualifier
- WC = Wild card
- LL = Lucky loser
- Alt = Alternate
- ITF = ITF entry
- PR = Protected ranking
- SR = Special ranking
- SE = Special exempt
- JE = Junior exempt
- JR = Junior Accelerator Programme entrant
- CO = College Accelerator Programme entrant
- NG = Next Gen Accelerator Program entrant
- w/o = Walkover
- r = Retired
- d = Defaulted

=== Draw ===
First round
1	(France) J Halard-Decugis (Japan) A Sugiyama	7	7
(South Africa) K Grant (Venezuela) M Vento	5	5
(United States) L Davenport (United States) K Po	6	6
(Belgium) E Callens (Canada) S Jeyaseelan	4	1
3	(United States) L Raymond (Australia) R Stubbs	6	6
(United States) A Frazier (United States) K Schlukebir	1	2
(Russia) A Jidkova (United States) M Tu	6	7^{10}
Q	(Germany) G Arn (United States) M Washington	3	6^{8}
(South Africa) A Coetzer (United States) L McNeil	4	6	3
(Slovenia) P Rampre (United States) M Shaughnessy	6	2	6
(United States) E deLone (Australia) N Pratt	3	3
4	(France) A Fusai (France) N Tauziat	6	6
(United States) L Osterloh (United States) A Stevenson
(Spain) C Martínez (Argentina) P Tarabini	w/o
WC	(Russia) E Bovina (Slovakia) D Hantuchová	3	0
2	(Switzerland) M Hingis (Russia) A Kournikova	6	6

Quarterfinals
1	(France) J Halard-Decugis (Japan) A Sugiyama	7^{7}	6
(United States) L Davenport (United States) K Po	6^{4}	3
3	(United States) L Raymond (Australia) R Stubbs	3	6	6
(Russia) A Jidkova (United States) M Tu	6	2	3
(Slovenia) P Rampre (United States) M Shaughnessy	4	2
4	(France) A Fusai (France) N Tauziat	6	6
(Spain) C Martínez (Argentina) P Tarabini	1	1
2	(Switzerland) M Hingis (Russia) A Kournikova	6	6

Semifinals
1	(France) J Halard-Decugis (Japan) A Sugiyama	5	1
3	(United States) L Raymond (Australia) R Stubbs	7	6
4	(France) A Fusai (France) N Tauziat	1	2
2	(Switzerland) M Hingis (Russia) A Kournikova	6	6

Final
3	(United States) L Raymond (Australia) R Stubbs	2	5
2	(Switzerland) M Hingis (Russia) A Kournikova	6	7
