= 1993 Virginia Slims of Philadelphia =

- Date: November 9–14
- Edition: 11th
- Category: Tier I
- Draw: 32S / 16D
- Prize money: $750,000
- Surface: Carpet / indoor
- Location: Philadelphia, PA, U.S.
- Venue: Philadelphia Civic Center

Champions

Singles
- (Spain) Conchita Martínez

Doubles
- (United States) Katrina Adams / (Netherlands) Manon Bollegraf
- Virginia Slims of Philadelphia

The 1993 Virginia Slims of Philadelphia was a women's tennis tournament played on indoor carpet courts at the Philadelphia Civic Center in Philadelphia in the United States that was part of the Tier I category of the 1993 WTA Tour. It was the 11th edition of the tournament and was held from November 9 through November 14, 1993. Second-seeded Conchita Martínez won the singles title and earned $150,000 first-prize money.

== Finals ==
=== Singles ===
(Spain) Conchita Martínez defeated (Germany) Steffi Graf 6–3, 6–3

- It was Martínez' 5th singles title of the year and the 16th of her career.

=== Doubles ===
(United States) Katrina Adams / (Netherlands) Manon Bollegraf defeated (Spain) Conchita Martínez / (Latvia) Larisa Savchenko 6–2, 4–6, 7–6^{(9–7)}
