= 1976 Virginia Slims of Philadelphia =

- Date: March 28 – April 3
- Edition: 5th
- Category: Virginia Slims circuit
- Draw: 34S / 16D
- Prize money: $75,000
- Surface: Carpet (Sporteze) / indoor
- Location: Philadelphia, Pennsylvania, U.S.
- Venue: The Palestra
- Attendance: 28,597

Champions

Singles
- (Australia) Evonne Goolagong Cawley

Doubles
- (United States) Billie Jean King / (Netherlands) Betty Stöve
← 1975 ·	Virginia Slims of Philadelphia	· 1977 →

The 1976 Virginia Slims of Philadelphia was a women's tennis tournament played on indoor carpet courts at the Palestra in Philadelphia, Pennsylvania in the United States that was part of the 1976 Virginia Slims World Championship Series. It was the fifth edition of the tournament and was held from March 28 through April 3, 1976. Second-seeded Evonne Goolagong Cawley won the singles title and earned $15,000 first-prize money.

== Finals ==
=== Singles ===
(Australia) Evonne Goolagong Cawley defeated (United States) Chris Evert 6–3, 7–6^{(5–3)}

- It was Goolagong's 5th singles title of the year and the 67th of her career.

=== Doubles ===
(United States) Billie Jean King / (Netherlands) Betty Stöve defeated (United States) Rosie Casals / (France) Françoise Dürr 7–6^{(5–4)}, 6–4

== Prize money ==
Event	W	F	3rd	4th	QF	Round of 16	Round of 32	Prelim. round
Singles	$15,000	$8,000	$4,650	$3,900	$1,900	$1,100	$550	$375
