= 2005 Advanta Championships – Singles =

Singles
- 2005 Advanta Championships

Final
- Champion: (France) Amélie Mauresmo
- Runner-up: (Russia) Elena Dementieva
- Score: 7–5, 2–6, 7–5

Details
- Draw: 28
- Seeds: 8

Events
Singles	Doubles
- Advanta Championships of Philadelphia

Third-seeded Amélie Mauresmo was the two-time defending champion, and successfully defended her title.

== Seeds ==
1. (United States) Lindsay Davenport (withdrew due to flu)
2. (Russia) Maria Sharapova (withdrew due to a right thumb sprain)
3. (France) Amélie Mauresmo (champion)
4. (Russia) Elena Dementieva (final)
5. (Switzerland) Patty Schnyder (withdrew due to left hand contusion)
6. (Russia) Nadia Petrova (semifinals, withdrew due to a right heel contusion)
7. (Czech Republic) Nicole Vaidišová (semifinals)
8. (Serbia and Montenegro) Jelena Janković (first round)
9. (Russia) Vera Zvonareva (first round)

== Draw ==
Key

- Q = Qualifier
- WC = Wild card
- LL = Lucky loser
- Alt = Alternate
- ITF = ITF entry
- PR = Protected ranking
- SR = Special ranking
- SE = Special exempt
- JE = Junior exempt
- JR = Junior Accelerator Programme entrant
- CO = College Accelerator Programme entrant
- NG = Next Gen Accelerator Program entrant
- w/o = Walkover
- r = Retired
- d = Defaulted

=== Finals ===
Semifinals
6	(Russia) Nadia Petrova
4/WC	(Russia) Elena Dementieva	w/o
3	(France) Amélie Mauresmo	7	7
7	(Czech Republic) Nicole Vaidišová	5	5

Final
4/WC	(Russia) Elena Dementieva	5	6	5
3	(France) Amélie Mauresmo	7	2	7

=== Top half ===
First round
(Slovakia) M Suchá	6	5	6
LL	(France) S Foretz	1	7	1
Q	(Czech Republic) H Šromová	2	1
WC	(Russia) Y Shvedova	6	6
Q	(Belarus) T Poutchek	4	2
6	(Russia) N Petrova	6	6
Q	(Germany) A Bachmann	6	4
(Argentina) M Díaz Oliva	0	1	r
(United States) J Craybas	1	1
(Czech Republic) K Peschke	6	6
(Bulgaria) S Karatantcheva	7	6
9	(Russia) V Zvonareva	5	3

Second round
LL	(United States) A Haynes	3	1
(Slovakia) M Suchá	6	6
WC	(Russia) Y Shvedova	2	2
6	(Russia) N Petrova	6	6
4/WC	(Russia) E Dementieva	6	6
Q	(Germany) A Bachmann	3	4
(Czech Republic) K Peschke	6	6
(Bulgaria) S Karatantcheva	1	0

Quarterfinals
(Slovakia) M Suchá	5	6^{5}
6	(Russia) N Petrova	7	7
4/WC	(Russia) E Dementieva	4	6	6
(Czech Republic) K Peschke	6	0	3

Semifinals
6	(Russia) N Petrova
4/WC	(Russia) E Dementieva	w/o

=== Bottom half ===
First round
8	(Serbia and Montenegro) J Janković	4	6	5
(Russia) T Panova	6	3	7
(United States) M Washington	6	5	6
(United States) M Shaughnessy	2	7	2
(Czech Republic) I Benešová	5	4
(Japan) A Sugiyama	7	6
7	(Czech Republic) N Vaidišová	6	6
Q	(Germany) V Henke	1	1
(Czech Republic) K Koukalová	0	7	6
WC	(United States) A Rolle	6	6^{5}	3
(Australia) S Stosur	6^{6}	6	1
(United States) L Raymond	7	4	6

Second round
(Russia) T Panova	6^{4}	3
(United States) M Washington	7	6
(Japan) A Sugiyama	3	4
3	(France) A Mauresmo	6	6
7	(Czech Republic) N Vaidišová	4	6	6
(Czech Republic) K Koukalová	6	1	4
(United States) L Raymond	6	3	6
LL	(Germany) S Gehrlein	1	6	2

Quarterfinals
(United States) M Washington	3	4
3	(France) A Mauresmo	6	6
7	(Czech Republic) N Vaidišová	6	6
(United States) L Raymond	4	1

Semifinals
3	(France) A Mauresmo	7	7
7	(Czech Republic) N Vaidišová	5	5
