= 2004 Advanta Championships – Doubles =

Doubles
- 2004 Advanta Championships

Final
- Champion: (Australia) Alicia Molik (United States) Lisa Raymond
- Runner-up: (South Africa) Liezel Huber (United States) Corina Morariu
- Score: 7–5, 6–4

Details
- Draw: 16
- Seeds: 4

Events
Singles	Doubles
- Advanta Championships of Philadelphia

Martina Navratilova and Lisa Raymond were the defending doubles champions from 2003, but Navratilova chose not to participate. Raymond successfully defended her title, playing alongside Alicia Molik.

== Seeds ==
The top four seeds receive a bye into the second round.

1. (Zimbabwe) Cara Black / (Australia) Rennae Stubbs (semifinals)
2. (Russia) Anastasia Myskina / (Russia) Vera Zvonareva (semifinals)
3. (Australia) Alicia Molik / (United States) Lisa Raymond (champions)
4. (South Africa) Liezel Huber / (United States) Corina Morariu (final)

== Results ==
Key

- Q = Qualifier
- WC = Wild card
- LL = Lucky loser
- Alt = Alternate
- ITF = ITF entry
- PR = Protected ranking
- SR = Special ranking
- SE = Special exempt
- JE = Junior exempt
- JR = Junior Accelerator Programme entrant
- CO = College Accelerator Programme entrant
- NG = Next Gen Accelerator Program entrant
- w/o = Walkover
- r = Retired
- d = Defaulted

=== Draw ===
First round
1	(Zimbabwe) C Black (Australia) R Stubbs	6	6
(United States) J Russell (United States) M Tu	3	1
(South Africa) K Grant (Russia) T Panova	2	4
(Croatia) J Kostanić (Chinese Taipei) J Lee	6	6
3	(Australia) A Molik (United States) L Raymond	6	5	6
(Czech Republic) I Benešová (Russia) G Voskoboeva	3	7	3
(Argentina) E Krauth (Germany) J Wöhr	4	3
(Canada) M Drake (Japan) N Miyagi	6	6
Q	(South Africa) N Grandin (United States) K McCain	6	6
WC	(Brazil) MF Alves (United States) K Smashey	4	2
(Romania) R Dragomir (United States) S Reeves	2	5
4	(South Africa) L Huber (United States) C Morariu	6	7
(Ukraine) Y Fedak (Belarus) T Poutchek	6	6
(Germany) A Rösch (Germany) M Weingärtner	2	1
(United States) T Ashley (United States) B Mattek	7	6^{5}	1
2	(Russia) A Myskina (Russia) V Zvonareva	5	7	6

Quarterfinals
1	(Zimbabwe) C Black (Australia) R Stubbs	w/o
(Croatia) J Kostanić (Chinese Taipei) J Lee
3	(Australia) A Molik (United States) L Raymond	6	6
(Canada) M Drake (Japan) N Miyagi	2	3
Q	(South Africa) N Grandin (United States) K McCain	3	5
4	(South Africa) L Huber (United States) C Morariu	6	7
(Ukraine) Y Fedak (Belarus) T Poutchek	3	4
2	(Russia) A Myskina (Russia) V Zvonareva	6	6

Semifinals
1	(Zimbabwe) C Black (Australia) R Stubbs	2	3
3	(Australia) A Molik (United States) L Raymond	6	6
4	(South Africa) L Huber (United States) C Morariu	w/o
2	(Russia) A Myskina (Russia) V Zvonareva

Final
3	(Australia) A Molik (United States) L Raymond	7	6
4	(South Africa) L Huber (United States) C Morariu	5	4
