= 2004 Advanta Championships – Singles =

Singles
- 2004 Advanta Championships

Final
- Champion: (France) Amélie Mauresmo
- Runner-up: (Russia) Vera Zvonareva
- Score: 3–6, 6–2, 6–2

Details
- Draw: 28
- Seeds: 8

Events
Singles	Doubles
- Advanta Championships of Philadelphia

First-seeded Amélie Mauresmo was the defending champion, and successfully defended her singles title at the 2004 Advanta Championships tennis tournament.

== Seeds ==
The top four seeds receive a bye into the second round.

1. (France) Amélie Mauresmo (champion)
2. (Russia) Anastasia Myskina (quarterfinals)
3. (Russia) Maria Sharapova (semifinals, withdrew due to a right shoulder sprain)
4. (United States) Jennifer Capriati (quarterfinals)
5. (United States) Venus Williams (quarterfinals)
6. (Russia) Vera Zvonareva (final)
7. (Russia) Nadia Petrova (semifinals)
8. (Australia) Alicia Molik (quarterfinals)

== Draw ==
Key

- Q = Qualifier
- WC = Wild card
- LL = Lucky loser
- Alt = Alternate
- ITF = ITF entry
- PR = Protected ranking
- SR = Special ranking
- SE = Special exempt
- JE = Junior exempt
- JR = Junior Accelerator Programme entrant
- CO = College Accelerator Programme entrant
- NG = Next Gen Accelerator Program entrant
- w/o = Walkover
- r = Retired
- d = Defaulted

=== Finals ===
Semifinals
1	(France) Amélie Mauresmo	w/o
3	(Russia) Maria Sharapova
6	(Russia) Vera Zvonareva	6	7
7	(Russia) Nadia Petrova	3	6^{2}

Final
1	(France) Amélie Mauresmo	3	6	6
6	(Russia) Vera Zvonareva	6	2	2

=== Top half ===
First round
(Czech Republic) I Benešová	6	3	6
(Puerto Rico) K Brandi	4	6	2
Q	(United States) T Ashley	6	2	1
(Ukraine) Y Fedak	0	6	6
(United States) L Raymond	2	1
5	(United States) V Williams	6	6
LL	(Luxembourg) A Kremer	4	6	5
(Croatia) J Kostanić	6	2	7
(Serbia and Montenegro) J Janković	5	6	6
(Venezuela) M Vento-Kabchi	7	4	1
(Germany) M Weingärtner	2	4
8	(Australia) A Molik	6	6

Second round
1	(France) A Mauresmo	6	6
(Czech Republic) I Benešová	2	2
(Ukraine) Y Fedak	4	6	6^{4}
5	(United States) V Williams	6	2	7
3	(Russia) M Sharapova	2	6	3
(Croatia) J Kostanić	6	4	0^{r}
(Serbia and Montenegro) J Janković	5	3
8	(Australia) A Molik	7	6

Quarterfinals
1	(France) A Mauresmo	7	5	6
5	(United States) V Williams	5	7	1
3	(Russia) M Sharapova	3	6	6
8	(Australia) A Molik	6	1	3

Semifinals
1	(France) A Mauresmo	w/o
3	(Russia) M Sharapova

=== Bottom half ===
First round
6	(Russia) V Zvonareva	6	3	7
Q	(Austria) S Bammer	4	6	6^{5}
(France) N Dechy	6	6
(Slovenia) T Pisnik	3	0
(United States) M Shaughnessy	3	6	6
WC	(United States) K McCain	6	1	2
7	(Russia) N Petrova	6	6
(Russia) T Panova	2	0
(United States) A Frazier	6	7
WC	(Czech Republic) N Vaidišová	2	5
Q	(United States) M Tu	4	4
Q	(Paraguay) R de los Ríos	6	6

Second round
6	(Russia) V Zvonareva	2	6	6
(France) N Dechy	6	3	4
(United States) M Shaughnessy	6	3	4
4	(United States) J Capriati	4	6	6
7	(Russia) N Petrova	6	6
(United States) A Frazier	4	3
Q	(Paraguay) R de los Ríos	4	6^{0}
2	(Russia) A Myskina	6	7

Quarterfinals
6	(Russia) V Zvonareva	6	6
4	(United States) J Capriati	0	1
7	(Russia) N Petrova	6	4	6
2	(Russia) A Myskina	3	6	4

Semifinals
6	(Russia) V Zvonareva	6	7
7	(Russia) N Petrova	3	6^{2}
