= 1995 Advanta Championships of Philadelphia – Doubles =

Doubles
- 1995 Advanta Championships of Philadelphia

Final
- Champions: (United States) Lori McNeil (Czech Republic) Helena Suková
- Runners-up: (United States) Meredith McGrath (Latvia) Larisa Neiland
- Score: 4–6, 6–3, 6–4

Details
- Draw: 16
- Seeds: 4

Events
Singles	Doubles
- Advanta Championships of Philadelphia

Gigi Fernández and Helena Suková were the defending champions, but competed this year with different partners.

Fernández teamed up with Natasha Zvereva and lost in quarterfinals to tournament winners Lori McNeil and Helena Suková.

Suková teamed up with Lori McNeil and successfully defended her title, by defeating Meredith McGrath and Larisa Neiland 4–6, 6–3, 6–4 in the final.

== Seeds ==
1. (United States) Gigi Fernández / (Belarus) Natasha Zvereva (quarterfinals)
2. (United States) Meredith McGrath / (Latvia) Larisa Neiland (final)
3. (Argentina) Gabriela Sabatini / (Netherlands) Brenda Schultz-McCarthy (first round)
4. (United States) Nicole Arendt / (Netherlands) Manon Bollegraf (quarterfinals)

== Draw ==
Key

- Q = Qualifier
- WC = Wild card
- LL = Lucky loser
- Alt = Alternate
- ITF = ITF entry
- PR = Protected ranking
- SR = Special ranking
- SE = Special exempt
- JE = Junior exempt
- JR = Junior Accelerator Programme entrant
- CO = College Accelerator Programme entrant
- NG = Next Gen Accelerator Program entrant
- w/o = Walkover
- r = Retired
- d = Defaulted

=== Draw ===
First round
1	(United States) G Fernández (Belarus) N Zvereva	6	6
(Spain) C Martínez (Argentina) P Tarabini	2	3
(Switzerland) M Hingis (Romania) I Spîrlea	2	2
(United States) L McNeil (Czech Republic) H Suková	6	6
3	(Argentina) G Sabatini (Netherlands) B Schultz-McCarthy	6	3	4
(United States) C Rubin (United States) P Shriver	4	6	6
WC	(Canada) S Jeyaseelan (Colombia) F Zuluaga	0	0
(United States) K Adams (United States) Z Garrison-Jackson	6	6
(United States) L Raymond (Australia) R Stubbs	6	6
(South Africa) M de Swardt (Netherlands) C Vis	3	1
(Japan) K Nagatsuka (Japan) A Sugiyama	2	5
4	(United States) N Arendt (Netherlands) M Bollegraf	6	7
Q	(United States) A Frazier (United States) K Po	2	3
(South Africa) A Coetzer (Argentina) I Gorrochategui	6	6
(France) J Halard-Decugis (France) N Tauziat	4	2
2	(United States) M McGrath (Latvia) L Neiland	6	6

Quarterfinals
1	(United States) G Fernández (Belarus) N Zvereva	4	5
(United States) L McNeil (Czech Republic) H Suková	6	7
(United States) C Rubin (United States) P Shriver	6	7
(United States) K Adams (United States) Z Garrison-Jackson	4	6
(United States) L Raymond (Australia) R Stubbs	6	6
4	(United States) N Arendt (Netherlands) M Bollegraf	4	2
(South Africa) A Coetzer (Argentina) I Gorrochategui	6	6	4
2	(United States) M McGrath (Latvia) L Neiland	7	3	6

Semifinals
(United States) L McNeil (Czech Republic) H Suková	6	6
(United States) C Rubin (United States) P Shriver	3	0
(United States) L Raymond (Australia) R Stubbs	4	6	3
2	(United States) M McGrath (Latvia) L Neiland	6	3	6

Final
(United States) L McNeil (Czech Republic) H Suková	4	6	6
2	(United States) M McGrath (Latvia) L Neiland	6	3	4
