= 1995 Advanta Championships of Philadelphia – Singles =

Singles
- 1995 Advanta Championships of Philadelphia

Final
- Champion: (Germany) Steffi Graf
- Runner-up: (United States) Lori McNeil
- Score: 6–1, 4–6, 6–3

Details
- Draw: 28
- Seeds: 8

Events
| Singles | Doubles |
- Advanta Championships of Philadelphia

First-seeded Steffi Graf defeated Lori McNeil in the final, 6–1, 4–6, 6–3 to win the singles tennis title at the 1995 Virginia Slims of Philadelphia.

Anke Huber was the defending champion, but lost in the semifinals to McNeil.

== Seeds ==
The top four seeds received a bye into the second round.

1. (Germany) Steffi Graf (champion)
2. (Spain) Conchita Martínez (quarterfinals)
3. (France) Mary Pierce (second round)
4. (Argentina) Gabriela Sabatini (quarterfinals)
5. (n/a)
6. (n/a)
7. (Germany) Anke Huber (semifinals)
8. (United States) Chanda Rubin (second round)
9. (Belarus) Natasha Zvereva (second round)

== Draw ==
Key

- Q = Qualifier
- WC = Wild card
- LL = Lucky loser
- Alt = Alternate
- ITF = ITF entry
- PR = Protected ranking
- SR = Special ranking
- SE = Special exempt
- JE = Junior exempt
- JR = Junior Accelerator Programme entrant
- CO = College Accelerator Programme entrant
- NG = Next Gen Accelerator Program entrant
- w/o = Walkover
- r = Retired
- d = Defaulted

=== Finals ===
Semifinals
1 | (Germany) Steffi Graf | 6 | 6
(United States) Zina Garrison-Jackson | 1 | 3
7 | (Germany) Anke Huber | 4 | 7 | 6
(United States) Lori McNeil | 6 | 6 | 7

Final
1 | (Germany) Steffi Graf | 6 | 4 | 6
(United States) Lori McNeil | 1 | 6 | 3

=== Top half ===
First round
(United States) A Frazier | 7 | 5
Q | (Australia) N Pratt | 5 | 1
Q | (United States) M McGrath | 6 | 6
(United States) P Shriver | 3 | 1
LL | (Latvia) L Neiland | 3 | 3
8 | (United States) C Rubin | 6 | 6
(Colombia) F Zuluaga | 0 | 2
(United States) Z Garrison-Jackson | 6 | 6
(Romania) I Spîrlea | 6 | 6 | 6
(United States) G Fernández | 4 | 7 | 3
(South Africa) A Coetzer | 6 | 2 | 3
9 | (Belarus) N Zvereva | 2 | 6 | 6

Second round
1 | (Germany) S Graf | 2 | 6 | 6
(United States) A Frazier | 6 | 4 | 2
Q | (United States) M McGrath | 6 | 6
8 | (United States) C Rubin | 3 | 1
3 | (France) M Pierce | 3 | 5
(United States) Z Garrison-Jackson | 6 | 7
(Romania) I Spîrlea | 6 | 1 | 6
9 | (Belarus) N Zvereva | 2 | 6 | 1

Quarterfinals
1 | (Germany) S Graf | 6 | 6
Q | (United States) M McGrath | 3 | 2
(United States) Z Garrison-Jackson | 6 | 5 | 6
(Romania) I Spîrlea | 1 | 7 | 4

Semifinals
1 | (Germany) S Graf | 6 | 6
(United States) Z Garrison-Jackson | 1 | 3

=== Bottom half ===
First round
7 | (Germany) A Huber | 6 | 6
Q | (United States) A Miller | 1 | 4
WC | (United States) M Tu | 6 | 6 | 3
(Switzerland) M Hingis | 4 | 7 | 6
(Netherlands) B Schultz-McCarthy | 1 | 6 | 6
Q | (Netherlands) C Vis | 6 | 3 | 3
LL | (United States) S Stafford | 3 | 2
(United States) L McNeil | 6 | 6
(Czech Republic) H Suková | 6 | 4 | 6
(United States) L Raymond | 1 | 6 | 7
(France) J Halard-Decugis | 4 | 4
(France) N Tauziat | 6 | 6

Second round
7 | (Germany) A Huber | 2 | 6 | 6
(Switzerland) M Hingis | 6 | 1 | 2
(Netherlands) B Schultz-McCarthy | 3 | 6
4 | (Argentina) G Sabatini | 6 | 7
(United States) L McNeil | 6 | 7
(United States) L Raymond | 4 | 5
(France) N Tauziat | 6 | 1 | 4
2 | (Spain) C Martínez | 4 | 6 | 6

Quarterfinals
7 | (Germany) A Huber | 7 | 6
4 | (Argentina) G Sabatini | 5 | 2
(United States) L McNeil | 6 | 6 | 6
2 | (Spain) C Martínez | 7 | 3 | 2

Semifinals
7 | (Germany) A Huber | 4 | 7 | 6
(United States) L McNeil | 6 | 6 | 7
