= 1994 Virginia Slims of Philadelphia – Doubles =

Doubles
- 1994 Virginia Slims of Philadelphia

Final
- Champions: (United States) Gigi Fernández (Belarus) Natasha Zvereva
- Runners-up: (Argentina) Gabriela Sabatini (Netherlands) Brenda Schultz
- Score: 4–6, 6–4, 6–2

Details
- Draw: 16
- Seeds: 4

Events
Singles	Doubles
- Advanta Championships of Philadelphia

Katrina Adams and Manon Bollegraf were the defending champions, but Adams did not compete this year. Bollegraf teamed up with Zina Garrison-Jackson and lost in the first round to Gigi Fernández and Natasha Zvereva.

The first-seeded team of Gigi Fernández and Natasha Zvereva won the title by defeating Gabriela Sabatini and Brenda Schultz 4–6, 6–4, 6–2 in the final.

== Seeds ==
1. (United States) Gigi Fernández / (Belarus) Natasha Zvereva (champions)
2. (United States) Patty Fendick / (United States) Meredith McGrath (quarterfinals)
3. (United States) Pam Shriver / (Australia) Elizabeth Smylie (quarterfinals)
4. (United States) Lindsay Davenport / (United States) Lisa Raymond (semifinals)

== Draw ==
Key

- Q = Qualifier
- WC = Wild card
- LL = Lucky loser
- Alt = Alternate
- ITF = ITF entry
- PR = Protected ranking
- SR = Special ranking
- SE = Special exempt
- JE = Junior exempt
- JR = Junior Accelerator Programme entrant
- CO = College Accelerator Programme entrant
- NG = Next Gen Accelerator Program entrant
- w/o = Walkover
- r = Retired
- d = Defaulted

=== Draw ===
First round
1	(United States) G Fernández (Belarus) N Zvereva	6	6
(Netherlands) M Bollegraf (United States) Z Garrison-Jackson	2	2
(France) J Halard (France) N Tauziat	4	6^{4}
(South Africa) A Coetzer (United States) D Graham	6	7^{7}
4	(United States) L Davenport (United States) L Raymond	6	6
(United States) V Paynter (France) K Quentrec	4	4
LL	(France) L Ghirardi (Georgia (country)) N Louarsabishvili	6	6
(Canada) J Hetherington (United States) S Stafford	3	2
(Bulgaria) K Maleeva (United States) R White	4	0
(Spain) C Martínez (Argentina) P Tarabini	6	6
LL	(United States) E deLone (United States) A Keller	7	3	1
3	(United States) P Shriver (Australia) E Smylie	5	6	6
Q	(United States) M Werdel (United States) T Whitlinger-Jones	6^{3}	6	6^{4}
(Argentina) G Sabatini (Netherlands) B Schultz	7^{7}	2	7^{7}
(United States) A Frazier (United States) K Po	1	3
2	(United States) P Fendick (United States) M McGrath	6	6

Quarterfinals
1	(United States) G Fernández (Belarus) N Zvereva	6	6
(South Africa) A Coetzer (United States) D Graham	1	0
4	(United States) L Davenport (United States) L Raymond	6	6^{6}	6
LL	(France) L Ghirardi (Georgia (country)) N Louarsabishvili	2	7^{8}	4
(Spain) C Martínez (Argentina) P Tarabini	6	6
3	(United States) P Shriver (Australia) E Smylie	4	4
(Argentina) G Sabatini (Netherlands) B Schultz	5	6	6
2	(United States) P Fendick (United States) M McGrath	7	4	4

Semifinals
1	(United States) G Fernández (Belarus) N Zvereva	6	6
4	(United States) L Davenport (United States) L Raymond	2	3
(Spain) C Martínez (Argentina) P Tarabini	6^{2}	6	1
(Argentina) G Sabatini (Netherlands) B Schultz	7^{7}	3	6

Final
1	(United States) G Fernández (Belarus) N Zvereva	4	6	6
(Argentina) G Sabatini (Netherlands) B Schultz	6	4	2
