= 1994 Virginia Slims of Philadelphia =

- Date: November 7–13
- Edition: 12th
- Category: Tier I
- Draw: 32S / 16D
- Prize money: $750,000
- Surface: Carpet / indoor
- Location: Philadelphia, PA, U.S.
- Venue: Philadelphia Civic Center

Champions

Singles
- (Germany) Anke Huber

Doubles
- (United States) Gigi Fernández / (Belarus) Natasha Zvereva
- Virginia Slims of Philadelphia

The 1994 Virginia Slims of Philadelphia was a women's tennis tournament played on indoor carpet courts at the Philadelphia Civic Center in Philadelphia, Pennsylvania in the United States that was part of the Tier I category of the 1994 WTA Tour. It was the 12th edition of the tournament and was held from November 7 through November 13, 1994. Sixth-seeded Anke Huber won the singles title and earned $150,000 first-prize money.

The tournament was highlighted by the presence of Jennifer Capriati, who returned to professional tennis after a 14-month hiatus. Her last match was at the first round of the 1993 US Open, where she lost to Leila Meskhi. Capriati eventually lost in the first round against tournament winner Anke Huber, in what would end up being her only match in the entire 1994 season.

== Finals ==
=== Singles ===
(Germany) Anke Huber defeated (France) Mary Pierce 6–0, 6–7^{(4–7)}, 7–5

- It was Huber's 3rd singles title of the year and the 6th of her career.

=== Doubles ===
(United States) Gigi Fernández / (Belarus) Natasha Zvereva defeated (Argentina) Gabriela Sabatini / (Netherlands) Brenda Schultz 4–6, 6–4, 6–2
