= 1996 Advanta Championships of Philadelphia =

- Date: November 11–17
- Edition: 14th
- Category: Tier II
- Draw: 28S / 16D
- Prize money: $450,000
- Surface: Carpet / indoor
- Location: Philadelphia, PA, U.S.
- Venue: Philadelphia Civic Center

Champions

Singles
- (Czech Republic) Jana Novotná

Doubles
- (United States) Lisa Raymond / (Australia) Rennae Stubbs
- Championships of Philadelphia

The 1996 Advanta Championships of Philadelphia was a women's tennis tournament played on indoor carpet courts at the Philadelphia Civic Center in Philadelphia, Pennsylvania in the United States that was part of Tier II of the 1996 WTA Tour. It was the 14th edition of the tournament and was held from November 11 through November 17, 1996. Third-seeded Jana Novotná won the singles title.

== Finals ==
=== Singles ===
(Czech Republic) Jana Novotná defeated (Germany) Steffi Graf 6–4 (Graf retired)

- It was Novotná's 10th title of the year and the 76th of her career.

=== Doubles ===
(United States) Lisa Raymond / (Australia) Rennae Stubbs defeated (United States) Nicole Arendt / (United States) Lori McNeil 6–4, 3–6, 6–3

- It was Raymond's 4th title of the year and the 7th of her career. It was Stubbs' 2nd title of the year and the 11th of her career.
