= 1994 Virginia Slims of Philadelphia – Singles =

Singles
- 1994 Virginia Slims of Philadelphia

Final
- Champion: (Germany) Anke Huber
- Runner-up: (France) Mary Pierce
- Score: 6–0, 6–7^{(4–7)}, 7–5

Details
- Draw: 32
- Seeds: 8

Events
Singles	Doubles
- Advanta Championships of Philadelphia

Sixth-seeded Anke Huber defeated Mary Pierce in the final, 6–0, 6–7^{(4–7)}, 7–5 to win the singles tennis title at the 1994 Virginia Slims of Philadelphia.

Conchita Martínez was the defending champion, but lost in the first round to Nathalie Tauziat.

== Seeds ==
1. (Spain) Conchita Martínez (first round)
2. (France) Mary Pierce (final)
3. (United States) Lindsay Davenport (second round)
4. (Argentina) Gabriela Sabatini (semifinals)
5. (Belarus) Natasha Zvereva (semifinals)
6. (Germany) Anke Huber (champion)
7. (United States) Amy Frazier (first round)
8. (South Africa) Amanda Coetzer (first round)

== Draw ==
Key

- Q = Qualifier
- WC = Wild card
- LL = Lucky loser
- Alt = Alternate
- ITF = ITF entry
- PR = Protected ranking
- SR = Special ranking
- SE = Special exempt
- JE = Junior exempt
- JR = Junior Accelerator Programme entrant
- CO = College Accelerator Programme entrant
- NG = Next Gen Accelerator Program entrant
- w/o = Walkover
- r = Retired
- d = Defaulted

=== Finals ===
Semifinals
6	(Germany) Anke Huber	6^{11}	6	6
4	(Argentina) Gabriela Sabatini	7^{13}	1	4
5	(Belarus) Natasha Zvereva	3	3
2	(France) Mary Pierce	6	6

Final
6	(Germany) Anke Huber	6	6^{4}	7
2	(France) Mary Pierce	0	7^{7}	5

=== Top half ===
First round
1	(Spain) C Martínez	4	4
(France) N Tauziat	6	6
(United States) K Po	6	1	7
Q	(Venezuela) M Vento	4	6	5
(United States) L Raymond	2	7^{8}	7
(United States) S Cacic	6	6^{6}	5
WC	(United States) J Capriati	4	6	1
6	(Germany) A Huber	6	3	6
4	(Argentina) G Sabatini	6	6
Q	(Canada) J Nejedly	4	1
LL	(South Africa) J Kruger	6	6
(United States) S Stafford	3	3
LL	(Argentina) M Paz	3	2
Q	(United States) E deLone	6	6
(United States) C Rubin	6	6
7	(United States) A Frazier	1	1

Second round
(France) N Tauziat	3	6	5
(United States) K Po	6	2	7
(United States) L Raymond	7	3	6^{1}
6	(Germany) A Huber	5	6	7^{7}
4	(Argentina) G Sabatini	6	6
LL	(South Africa) J Kruger	4	0
Q	(United States) E deLone	2	2
(United States) C Rubin	6	6

Quarterfinals
(United States) K Po	3	2
6	(Germany) A Huber	6	6
4	(Argentina) G Sabatini	6	6
(United States) C Rubin	3	0

Semifinals
6	(Germany) A Huber	6^{11}	6	6
4	(Argentina) G Sabatini	7^{13}	1	4

=== Bottom half ===
First round
5	(Belarus) N Zvereva	6	6
(United States) M McGrath	4	3
(United States) L Harvey Wild	2	6	3
(France) J Halard	6	3	6
(Netherlands) B Schultz	6	6
(United States) P Shriver	4	0
Q	(United States) T Whitlinger-Jones	5	3
3	(United States) L Davenport	7	6
8	(South Africa) A Coetzer	1	3
WC	(United States) M Tu	6	6
(Bulgaria) K Maleeva	6	7
(United States) Z Garrison-Jackson	4	5
(United States) P Fendick	6	6
(United States) M Werdel	2	4
LL	(Belarus) T Ignatieva	0	1
2	(France) M Pierce	6	6

Second round
5	(Belarus) N Zvereva	6	6
(France) J Halard	1	4
(Netherlands) B Schultz	2	6	6
3	(United States) L Davenport	6	2	4
WC	(United States) M Tu	6	6
(Bulgaria) K Maleeva	4	3
(United States) P Fendick	3	1
2	(France) M Pierce	6	6

Quarterfinals
5	(Belarus) N Zvereva	6	7^{7}
(Netherlands) B Schultz	1	6^{4}
WC	(United States) M Tu	2	4
2	(France) M Pierce	6	6

Semifinals
5	(Belarus) N Zvereva	3	3
2	(France) M Pierce	6	6
