= 2003 Advanta Championships – Singles =

Singles
- 2003 Advanta Championships

Final
- Champion: (France) Amélie Mauresmo
- Runner-up: (Russia) Anastasia Myskina
- Score: 5–7, 6–0, 6–2

Details
- Draw: 28
- Seeds: 8

Events
Singles	Doubles
- Advanta Championships of Philadelphia

Lindsay Davenport was the defending champion from when the event was last held in 2000, but she decided not to participate this year.

Second-seeded Amélie Mauresmo won the title, defeating Anastasia Myskina in the final, 5–7, 6–0, 6–2.

== Seeds ==
1. (United States) Venus Williams (withdrew due to an abdominal strain)
2. (France) Amélie Mauresmo (Winner)
3. (Russia) Anastasia Myskina (final)
4. (United States) Chanda Rubin (quarterfinals)
5. (Japan) Ai Sugiyama (semifinals)
6. (Russia) Vera Zvonareva (first round)
7. (Russia) Nadia Petrova (semifinals)
8. (Argentina) Paola Suárez (withdrew)
9. (United States) Meghann Shaughnessy (quarterfinals)
10. (Slovenia) Tina Pisnik (second round)

== Draw ==
Key

- Q = Qualifier
- WC = Wild card
- LL = Lucky loser
- Alt = Alternate
- ITF = ITF entry
- PR = Protected ranking
- SR = Special ranking
- SE = Special exempt
- JE = Junior exempt
- JR = Junior Accelerator Programme entrant
- CO = College Accelerator Programme entrant
- NG = Next Gen Accelerator Program entrant
- w/o = Walkover
- r = Retired
- d = Defaulted

=== Finals ===
Semifinals
3	(Russia) Anastasia Myskina	6	4	7
7	(Russia) Nadia Petrova	4	6	5
5	(Japan) Ai Sugiyama	6	6^{6}	5
2/WC	(France) Amélie Mauresmo	3	7	7

Final
3	(Russia) Anastasia Myskina	7	0	2
2/WC	(France) Amélie Mauresmo	5	6	6

=== Top half ===
First round
(Australia) N Pratt	6	3	7
Q	(United States) T Ashley	2	6	6^{2}
(Germany) M Weingärtner	6	6
LL	(United States) A Haynes	3	4
LL	(Chinese Taipei) J Lee	4	4
10	(Slovenia) T Pisnik	6	6
(Croatia) S Talaja	6	3	5
(United States) A Stevenson	4	6	7
(Zimbabwe) C Black	0	3
Q	(Slovakia) M Suchá	6	6
(United States) A Frazier	4	0
7	(Russia) N Petrova	6	6

Second round
3	(Russia) A Myskina	6	6
(Australia) N Pratt	3	2
(Germany) M Weingärtner	w/o
10	(Slovenia) T Pisnik
4	(United States) C Rubin	6	6
(United States) A Stevenson	2	4
Q	(Slovakia) M Suchá	1	7	3
7	(Russia) N Petrova	6	5	6

Quarterfinals
3	(Russia) A Myskina	6	6
(Germany) M Weingärtner	3	1
4	(United States) C Rubin	6^{5}	5
7	(Russia) N Petrova	7	7

Semifinals
3	(Russia) A Myskina	6	4	7
7	(Russia) N Petrova	4	6	5

=== Bottom half ===
First round
9	(United States) M Shaughnessy	6	6
LL	(Germany) A-L Grönefeld	3	2
(United States) A Harkleroad	6	2
(Russia) E Likhovtseva	0	0^{r}
(Italy) T Garbin	6	7
WC	(United States) M Irvin	1	6^{2}
6	(Russia) V Zvonareva	3	6	2
(United States) L Raymond	6	2	6
Q	(Federal Republic of Yugoslavia) J Janković	6	6
WC	(United States) S Perry	0	3
(France) S Cohen-Aloro	6	6
Q	(Hungary) A Kapros	3	3

Second round
9	(United States) M Shaughnessy	6	6
(United States) A Harkleroad	3	1
(Italy) T Garbin	4	7	3
5	(Japan) A Sugiyama	6	6^{3}	6
(United States) L Raymond	2	7	7
Q	(Federal Republic of Yugoslavia) J Janković	6	5	6^{5}
(France) S Cohen-Aloro	6^{4}	4
2/WC	(France) A Mauresmo	7	6

Quarterfinals
9	(United States) M Shaughnessy	2	7	2
5	(Japan) A Sugiyama	6	5	6
(United States) L Raymond	3	3
2/WC	(France) A Mauresmo	6	6

Semifinals
5	(Japan) A Sugiyama	6	6^{6}	5
2/WC	(France) A Mauresmo	3	7	7
