= 1978 Virginia Slims of Philadelphia =

- Date: March 20–26
- Edition: 7th
- Category: Virginia Slims circuit
- Draw: 32S / 16D
- Prize money: $100,000
- Surface: Carpet (Sporteze) / indoor
- Location: Philadelphia, Pennsylvania, US
- Venue: The Palestra

Champions

Singles
- (United States) Chris Evert

Doubles
- (Australia) Kerry Melville / (Australia) Wendy Turnbull
- Virginia Slims of Philadelphia

The 1978 Virginia Slims of Philadelphia was a women's tennis tournament played on indoor carpet courts at the Palestra in Philadelphia, Pennsylvania in the United States that was part of the 1978 Virginia Slims World Championship Series. It was the seventh edition of the tournament and was held from March 20 through March 26, 1978. First-seeded Chris Evert won the singles title and earned $20,000 first-prize money.

== Winners ==
=== Singles ===
(United States) Chris Evert defeated (United States) Billie Jean King 6–0, 6–4

=== Doubles ===
(Australia) Kerry Melville / (Australia) Wendy Turnbull defeated (France) Françoise Dürr / (United Kingdom) Virginia Wade 6–3, 7–5

== Prize money ==
Event	W	F	3rd	4th	QF	Round of 16	Round of 32
Singles	$20,000	$10,500	$6,300	$5,500	$2,800	$1,550	$850
