= 1993 Virginia Slims of Philadelphia – Doubles =

Doubles
- 1993 Virginia Slims of Philadelphia

Final
- Champions: (United States) Katrina Adams; (Netherlands) Manon Bollegraf
- Runners-up: (Spain) Conchita Martínez; (Latvia) Larisa Neiland
- Score: 6–2, 4–6, 7–6^{(9–7)}

Details
- Draw: 16
- Seeds: 4

Events
Singles	Doubles
- Advanta Championships of Philadelphia

Gigi Fernández and Natasha Zvereva were the defending champions, but lost in semifinals to Katrina Adams and Manon Bollegraf.

Katrina Adams and Manon Bollegraf won the title by defeating Conchita Martínez and Larisa Neiland 6–2, 4–6, 7–6^{(9–7)} in the final.

== Seeds ==
1. (United States) Gigi Fernández / (Belarus) Natasha Zvereva (semifinals)
2. (Spain) Conchita Martínez / (Latvia) Larisa Neiland (final)
3. (United States) Pam Shriver / (Australia) Elizabeth Smylie (quarterfinals)
4. (United States) Lori McNeil / (Australia) Rennae Stubbs (semifinals)

== Draw ==
Key

- Q = Qualifier
- WC = Wild card
- LL = Lucky loser
- Alt = Alternate
- ITF = ITF entry
- PR = Protected ranking
- SR = Special ranking
- SE = Special exempt
- JE = Junior exempt
- JR = Junior Accelerator Programme entrant
- CO = College Accelerator Programme entrant
- NG = Next Gen Accelerator Program entrant
- w/o = Walkover
- r = Retired
- d = Defaulted

=== Draw ===
First round

Quarterfinals

Semifinals

Final

1
(United States) G Fernández
(Belarus) N Zvereva
6
6

WC
- (Germany) S Haas
- (United States) A Miller
2
1

1
(United States) G Fernández
(Belarus) N Zvereva
6
6

- (Canada) J Hetherington
- (United States) K Rinaldi
3
5

- (United States) A Frazier
- (United States) A Grossman
1
1

(United States) A Frazier
(United States) A Grossman
6
7

1
- (United States) G Fernández
- (Belarus) N Zvereva
4
3

3
(United States) P Shriver
(Australia) E Smylie
7
6^{6}
7^{7}

(United States) K Adams
(Netherlands) M Bollegraf
6
6

- (South Africa) A Coetzer
- (Argentina) I Gorrochategui
5
7^{8}
6^{4}

3
- (United States) P Shriver
- (Australia) E Smylie
6^{4}
4

(United States) K Adams
(Netherlands) M Bollegraf
6
6

(United States) K Adams
(Netherlands) M Bollegraf
7^{7}
6

- (United States) S Collins
- (United States) C Rubin
2
4

(United States) K Adams
(Netherlands) M Bollegraf
6
4
7^{9}

Q
- (United States) K Po
- (United States) M Werdel
6^{3}
7^{8}
2

2
- (Spain) C Martínez
- (Latvia) L Neiland
2
6
6^{7}

(United States) MJ Fernández
(United States) Z Garrison-Jackson
7^{7}
6^{6}
6

- (United States) MJ Fernández
- (United States) Z Garrison-Jackson
4
6
3

- (United States) P Fendick
- (United States) M McGrath
4
6
2

4
(United States) L McNeil
(Australia) R Stubbs
6
4
6

4
(United States) L McNeil
(Australia) R Stubbs
6
4
6

4
- (United States) L McNeil
- (Australia) R Stubbs
7^{7}
6^{2}
6^{4}

(United States) L Davenport
(United States) L Raymond
3
6
6

2
(Spain) C Martínez
(Latvia) L Neiland
6^{2}
7^{7}
7^{7}

- (United States) D Graham
- (Netherlands) B Schultz
6
3
3

- (United States) L Davenport
- (United States) L Raymond
5
5

- (United States) G Helgeson
- (France) N Tauziat
1^{r}

2
(Spain) C Martínez
(Latvia) L Neiland
7
7

2
(Spain) C Martínez
(Latvia) L Neiland
6
