= 1996 Advanta Championships of Philadelphia – Doubles =

Doubles
- 1996 Advanta Championships of Philadelphia
- 1995 Champions: (United States) Lori McNeil (Czech Republic) Helena Suková

Final
- Champions: (United States) Lisa Raymond (Australia) Rennae Stubbs
- Runners-up: (United States) Nicole Arendt (United States) Lori McNeil
- Score: 6–4, 3–6, 6–3

Details
- Draw: 16
- Seeds: 4

Events
| Singles | Doubles |
- Advanta Championships of Philadelphia

Lori McNeil and Helena Suková were the defending champions but only McNeil competed that year with Nicole Arendt.

Arendt and McNeil lost in the final 6–4, 3–6, 6–3 against the unseeded team of Lisa Raymond and Rennae Stubbs.

== Seeds ==
Champion seeds are indicated in bold text while text in italics indicates the round in which those seeds were eliminated.

1. (United States) Lindsay Davenport / (Czech Republic) Jana Novotná (semifinals)
2. (United States) Mary Joe Fernández / (United States) Chanda Rubin (quarterfinals)
3. (United States) Gigi Fernández / (Spain) Conchita Martínez (first round)
4. (United States) Nicole Arendt / (United States) Lori McNeil (final)

== Draw ==
Key

- Q = Qualifier
- WC = Wild card
- LL = Lucky loser
- Alt = Alternate
- ITF = ITF entry
- PR = Protected ranking
- SR = Special ranking
- SE = Special exempt
- JE = Junior exempt
- JR = Junior Accelerator Programme entrant
- CO = College Accelerator Programme entrant
- NG = Next Gen Accelerator Program entrant
- w/o = Walkover
- r = Retired
- d = Defaulted

First round
1 | (United States) **L Davenport** (Czech Republic) **J Novotná** | **7** | **6**
(South Africa) A Coetzer (Russia) A Kournikova | 6 | 2
(Romania) I Spîrlea (France) N Tauziat | 6 | 4
(Australia) **E Smylie** (United States) **L Wild** | **7** | **6**
3 | (United States) G Fernández (Spain) C Martínez
(Japan) **R Hiraki** (Argentina) **L Montalvo** | **w/o**
(United States) **L Raymond** (Australia) **R Stubbs** | **6** | **6**
WC | (Canada) S Jeyaseelan (Canada) R Simpson | 2 | 3
(United States) **A Frazier** (United States) **K Po** | **7** | **6**
(United States) A Lettiere (Japan) N Miyagi | 5 | 3
(Canada) J Hetherington (United States) K Rinaldi-Stunkel | 3 | **6** | 5
4 | (United States) **N Arendt** (United States) **L McNeil** | **6** | 1 | **7**
(Indonesia) **Y Basuki** (Netherlands) **C Vis** | **6** | 3 | **6**
(Australia) N Bradtke (United States) P Shriver | 4 | **6** | 3
(United States) K Adams (United States) Z Garrison-Jackson | 4 | **6** | 6
2 | (United States) **M J Fernández** (United States) **C Rubin** | **6** | 3 | **7**

Quarterfinals
1 | (United States) **L Davenport** (Czech Republic) **J Novotná** | **6** | **6**
(Australia) E Smylie (United States) L Wild | 4 | 1
(Japan) R Hiraki (Argentina) L Montalvo | 1 | 4
(United States) **L Raymond** (Australia) **R Stubbs** | **6** | **6**
(United States) A Frazier (United States) K Po | 5 | 3
4 | (United States) **N Arendt** (United States) **L McNeil** | **7** | **6**
(Indonesia) **Y Basuki** (Netherlands) **C Vis** | **w/o**
2 | (United States) M J Fernández (United States) C Rubin

Semifinals
1 | (United States) L Davenport (Czech Republic) J Novotná | **6** | 3 | 3
(United States) **L Raymond** (Australia) **R Stubbs** | 4 | **6** | **6**
4 | (United States) **N Arendt** (United States) **L McNeil** | **6** | **6**
(Indonesia) Y Basuki (Netherlands) C Vis | 4 | 4

Final
(United States) **Lisa Raymond** (Australia) **Rennae Stubbs** | **6** | 3 | **6**
4 | (United States) Nicole Arendt (United States) Lori McNeil | 4 | **6** | 3
