= 2003 Advanta Championships =

- Date: October 27 – November 2
- Edition: 19th
- Category: Tier II
- Draw: 28S / 16D
- Prize money: $585,000
- Surface: Hard / indoor
- Location: Philadelphia, PA, U.S.
- Venue: The Pavilion

Champions

Singles
- (France) Amélie Mauresmo

Doubles
- (United States) Martina Navratilova / (United States) Lisa Raymond
- Championships of Philadelphia

The 2003 Advanta Championships was a tennis tournament played on indoor hard courts at The Pavilion in Villanova, Philadelphia, Pennsylvania in the United States that was part of Tier II of the 2003 WTA Tour. It was the 19th edition of the tournament and was held from October 27 through November 2, 2003. Second-seeded Amélie Mauresmo won the singles title and earned $93,000 first-prize money.

== Finals ==
=== Singles ===
(France) Amélie Mauresmo defeated (Russia) Anastasia Myskina 5–7, 6–0, 6–2

- It was Mauresmo's 2nd singles title of the year and the 10th of her career.

=== Doubles ===
(United States) Martina Navratilova / (United States) Lisa Raymond defeated (Zimbabwe) Cara Black / (Australia) Rennae Stubbs 6–3, 6–4
