= 1998 Advanta Championships of Philadelphia – Doubles =

Doubles
- 1998 Advanta Championships of Philadelphia

Final
- Champions: (Russia) Elena Likhovtseva (Japan) Ai Sugiyama
- Runners-up: (United States) Monica Seles (Belarus) Natasha Zvereva
- Score: 7–5, 4–6, 6–2

Details
- Draw: 16
- Seeds: 4

Events
Singles	Doubles
- Advanta Championships of Philadelphia

Lisa Raymond and Rennae Stubbs were the defending champions but lost in the semifinals to Monica Seles and Natasha Zvereva.

Elena Likhovtseva and Ai Sugiyama won in the final 7–5, 4–6, 6–2 against Seles and Zvereva.

== Seeds ==
Champion seeds are indicated in bold text while text in italics indicates the round in which those seeds were eliminated.

1. (Switzerland) Martina Hingis / (Czech Republic) Jana Novotná (semifinals)
2. (France) Alexandra Fusai / (France) Nathalie Tauziat (first round)
3. (United States) Lisa Raymond / (Australia) Rennae Stubbs (semifinals)
4. (Indonesia) Yayuk Basuki / (Netherlands) Caroline Vis (first round)

== Draw ==
Key

- Q = Qualifier
- WC = Wild card
- LL = Lucky loser
- Alt = Alternate
- ITF = ITF entry
- PR = Protected ranking
- SR = Special ranking
- SE = Special exempt
- JE = Junior exempt
- JR = Junior Accelerator Programme entrant
- CO = College Accelerator Programme entrant
- NG = Next Gen Accelerator Program entrant
- w/o = Walkover
- r = Retired
- d = Defaulted

First round
1	(Switzerland) **M Hingis** (Czech Republic) **J Novotná**	**6**	**6**
(United States) E deLone (Australia) N Pratt	0	1
(Italy) **S Farina** (Croatia) **I Majoli**	6	**6**	**7**
(United States) M J Fernández (Spain) A Sánchez Vicario	**7**	4	5
4	(Indonesia) Y Basuki (Netherlands) C Vis	6	**6**	6
WC	(United States) **S Cacic** (Canada) **S Jeyaseelan**	**7**	3	**7**
(Russia) **E Likhovtseva** (Japan) **A Sugiyama**	3	**6**	**6**
Q	(United States) S Reeves (United States) B Rippner	**6**	1	3
(Romania) I Spîrlea (Argentina) P Tarabini	**6**	4	2
(United States) **L McNeil** (United States) **K Po**	1	**6**	**6**
(Belgium) E Callens (Romania) C Cristea	3	2
3	(United States) **L Raymond** (Australia) **R Stubbs**	**6**	**6**
(Canada) M Drake (United States) L Lee	0	5
(United States) **L Davenport** (United States) **C Morariu**	**6**	**7**
(United States) **M Seles** (Belarus) **N Zvereva**	**6**	4	**6**
2	(France) A Fusai (France) N Tauziat	4	**6**	4

Quarterfinals
1	(Switzerland) **M Hingis** (Czech Republic) **J Novotná**	**6**	**6**
(Italy) S Farina (Croatia) I Majoli	4	0
WC	(United States) S Cacic (Canada) S Jeyaseelan	5	**6**	2
(Russia) **E Likhovtseva** (Japan) **A Sugiyama**	**7**	4	**6**
(United States) L McNeil (United States) K Po	2	1
3	(United States) **L Raymond** (Australia) **R Stubbs**	**6**	**6**
(United States) L Davenport (United States) C Morariu	**6**	5	3
(United States) **M Seles** (Belarus) **N Zvereva**	3	**7**	**6**

Semifinals
1	(Switzerland) M Hingis (Czech Republic) J Novotná	**6**	4	5
(Russia) **E Likhovtseva** (Japan) **A Sugiyama**	4	**6**	**7**
3	(United States) L Raymond (Australia) R Stubbs	3	**7**	6
(United States) **M Seles** (Belarus) **N Zvereva**	**6**	6	**7**

Final
(Russia) **Elena Likhovtseva** (Japan) **Ai Sugiyama**	**7**	4	**6**
(United States) Monica Seles (Belarus) Natasha Zvereva	5	**6**	2
