= 1977 Virginia Slims of Philadelphia =

- Date: March 14–20
- Edition: 6th
- Category: Virginia Slims circuit
- Draw: 32S / 16D
- Prize money: $100,000
- Surface: Carpet (Sporteze) / indoor
- Location: Philadelphia, Pennsylvania, U.S.
- Venue: The Palestra
- Attendance: 28,597

Champions

Singles
- (United States) Chris Evert

Doubles
- (France) Françoise Dürr / (United Kingdom) Virginia Wade
← 1976 ·	Virginia Slims of Philadelphia	· 1978 →

The 1977 Virginia Slims of Philadelphia was a women's tennis tournament played on indoor carpet courts at the Palestra in Philadelphia, Pennsylvania in the United States that was part of the 1977 Virginia Slims World Championship Series. It was the sixth edition of the tournament and was held from March 14 through March 20, 1977. First-seeded Chris Evert won the singles title and earned $20,000 first-prize money.

== Finals ==
=== Singles ===
(United States) Chris Evert defeated (United States) Martina Navratilova 6–4, 4–6, 6–3

- It was Evert's 5th singles title of the year and the 72nd of her career.

=== Doubles ===
(France) Françoise Dürr / (United Kingdom) Virginia Wade defeated (United States) Martina Navratilova / (Netherlands) Betty Stöve 6–4, 4–6, 6–4

== Prize money ==
Event	W	F	3rd	4th	QF	Round of 16	Round of 32
Singles	$20,000	$10,000	$5,800	$5,000	$2,500	$1,375	$775

== See also ==
- Evert–Navratilova rivalry
