= 1996 Advanta Championships of Philadelphia – Singles =

Singles
- 1996 Advanta Championships of Philadelphia
- 1995 Champion: (Germany) Steffi Graf

Final
- Champion: (Czech Republic) Jana Novotná
- Runner-up: (Germany) Steffi Graf
- Score: 6–4, ret.

Details
- Draw: 28
- Seeds: 8

Events
Singles	Doubles
- Advanta Championships of Philadelphia

Third-seeded Jana Novotná won the singles tennis title at the 1996 Advanta Championships of Philadelphia after the defending champion Steffi Graf retired in the final, with the scoreline at 6–4.

== Seeds ==
A champion seed is indicated in bold text while text in italics indicates the round in which that seed was eliminated. The top four seeds received a bye to the second round.

1. (Germany) Steffi Graf (final)
2. (Spain) Conchita Martínez (second round)
3. (Czech Republic) **Jana Novotná (champion)**
4. (Germany) Anke Huber (second round)
5. (United States) Lindsay Davenport (first round)
6. (Croatia) Iva Majoli (second round)
7. (United States) Mary Joe Fernández (first round)
8. (Austria) Barbara Paulus (quarterfinals)

== Draw ==
Key

- Q = Qualifier
- WC = Wild card
- LL = Lucky loser
- Alt = Alternate
- ITF = ITF entry
- PR = Protected ranking
- SR = Special ranking
- SE = Special exempt
- JE = Junior exempt
- JR = Junior Accelerator Programme entrant
- CO = College Accelerator Programme entrant
- NG = Next Gen Accelerator Program entrant
- w/o = Walkover
- r = Retired
- d = Defaulted

=== Final ===
Final
1	(Germany) Steffi Graf	4	0^{r}
3	(Czech Republic) **Jana Novotná**	**6**	0

=== Section 1 ===
First round
(Slovakia) K Habšudová	6	4
(United States) **A Frazier**	**7**	**6**
(Spain) V Ruano-Pascual	**6**	1	5
(United States) **C Rubin**	4	**6**	**7**
(Austria) J Wiesner	2	2
6	(Croatia) **I Majoli**	**6**	**6**
Q	(Slovakia) R Zrubáková	0	4
Q	(United States) **M Werdel-Witmeyer**	**6**	**6**
(France) N Tauziat	**6**	3	4
Q	(United States) **Z Garrison-Jackson**	2	**6**	**6**
(South Africa) A Coetzer	1	2
8	(Austria) **B Paulus**	**6**	**6**

Second round
1	(Germany) **S Graf**	**6**	**6**
(United States) A Frazier	2	1
(United States) **C Rubin**	5	**6**	**6**
6	(Croatia) I Majoli	**7**	2	1
4	(Germany) A Huber	**6**	6	1
Q	(United States) **M Werdel-Witmeyer**	2	**7**	**6**
Q	(United States) Z Garrison-Jackson
8	(Austria) **B Paulus**	**w/o**

Quarterfinals
1	(Germany) **S Graf**	**6**	**6**
(United States) C Rubin	0	3
Q	(United States) **M Werdel-Witmeyer**	**6**	**6**
8	(Austria) B Paulus	2	3

Semifinals
1	(Germany) **S Graf**	**6**	**7**
Q	(United States) M Werdel-Witmeyer	2	5

=== Section 2 ===
First round
5	(United States) L Davenport	4	6
(United States) **A Miller**	**6**	**7**
WC	(United States) **M Shaughnessy**	3	**6**	**6**
Q	(United States) L Poruri	**6**	2	2
(Japan) A Sugiyama	6	5
(United States) **L McNeil**	**7**	**7**
7	(United States) M J Fernández	2^{r}
(United States) **K Po**	5
(Indonesia) **Y Basuki**	**6**	**7**
WC	(Russia) A Kournikova	4	6
(United States) G Fernández	1	**6**	3
(United States) **L Raymond**	**6**	3	**6**

Second round
(United States) **A Miller**	4	**6**	**7**
WC	(United States) M Shaughnessy	**6**	2	5
(United States) L McNeil	4	5
3	(Czech Republic) **J Novotná**	**6**	**7**
(United States) K Po	4	4
(Indonesia) **Y Basuki**	**6**	**6**
(United States) **L Raymond**	**6**	**6**
2	(Spain) C Martínez	2	3

Quarterfinals
(United States) A Miller	3	0
3	(Czech Republic) **J Novotná**	**6**	**6**
(Indonesia) **Y Basuki**	5	**6**	**6**
(United States) L Raymond	**7**	3	3

Semifinals
3	(Czech Republic) **J Novotná**	**6**	**6**
(Indonesia) Y Basuki	3	1
