= 1998 Advanta Championships of Philadelphia – Singles =

Singles
- 1998 Advanta Championships of Philadelphia
- 1997 Champion: (Switzerland) Martina Hingis

Final
- Champion: (Germany) Steffi Graf
- Runner-up: (United States) Lindsay Davenport
- Score: 4–6, 6–3, 6–4

Details
- Draw: 28
- Seeds: 8

Events
Singles	Doubles
- Advanta Championships of Philadelphia

Martina Hingis was the defending champion but lost in the quarterfinals to Steffi Graf.

Graf won in the final 4–6, 6–3, 6–4 against Lindsay Davenport.

== Seeds ==
A champion seed is indicated in bold text while text in italics indicates the round in which that seed was eliminated. The top four seeds received a bye to the second round.

1. (United States) Lindsay Davenport (final)
2. (Switzerland) Martina Hingis (quarterfinals)
3. (Czech Republic) Jana Novotná (second round)
4. (Spain) Arantxa Sánchez Vicario (second round)
5. (United States) Monica Seles (semifinals)
6. (France) Nathalie Tauziat (semifinals)
7. (Switzerland) Patty Schnyder (second round)
8. (France) Sandrine Testud (first round)

== Draw ==
Key

- Q = Qualifier
- WC = Wild card
- LL = Lucky loser
- Alt = Alternate
- ITF = ITF entry
- PR = Protected ranking
- SR = Special ranking
- SE = Special exempt
- JE = Junior exempt
- JR = Junior Accelerator Programme entrant
- CO = College Accelerator Programme entrant
- NG = Next Gen Accelerator Program entrant
- w/o = Walkover
- r = Retired
- d = Defaulted

=== Final ===
Final
1	(United States) Lindsay Davenport	**6**	3	4
	(Germany) **Steffi Graf**	4	**6**	**6**

=== Top half ===
First round
(United States) C Morariu	1	3
(United States) **K Po**	**6**	**6**
(Croatia) I Majoli	**6**	2	4
Q	(United States) **A Frazier**	2	**6**	**6**
WC	(Italy) S Farina	6	**6**	4
7	(Switzerland) **P Schnyder**	**7**	4	**6**
(Belarus) **N Zvereva**	**6**	**6**
WC	(United States) T Snyder	2	1
(Venezuela) M Vento	1	2
(Japan) **A Sugiyama**	**6**	**6**
(Romania) I Spîrlea	3	4
5	(United States) **M Seles**	**6**	**6**

Second round
1	(United States) **L Davenport**	**6**	**6**
(United States) K Po	1	2
Q	(United States) **A Frazier**	**6**	**6**
7	(Switzerland) P Schnyder	3	1
3	(Czech Republic) J Novotná	4	4
(Belarus) **N Zvereva**	**6**	**6**
(Japan) A Sugiyama	3	5
5	(United States) **M Seles**	**6**	**7**

Quarterfinals
1	(United States) **L Davenport**	5	**6**	**6**
Q	(United States) A Frazier	**7**	3	3
(Belarus) N Zvereva	0	1
5	(United States) **M Seles**	**6**	**6**

Semifinals
1	(United States) **L Davenport**	**6**	**6**
5	(United States) M Seles	3	3

=== Bottom half ===
First round
6	(France) **N Tauziat**	**6**	**6**
(Germany) A Huber	3	2
(United States) **L Raymond**	**6**	**6**
Q	(Belgium) E Callens	3	3
Q	(United States) S Cacic	2	0
(South Africa) **A Coetzer**	**6**	**6**
8	(France) S Testud	6	**7**	0/r
(Russia) **E Likhovtseva**	**7**	6	**1**
(Germany) **S Graf**	**6**	**7**
WC	(United States) M J Fernández	3	6
Q	(United States) **B Rippner**	**7**	**6**
(France) A Fusai	6	2

Second round
6	(France) **N Tauziat**	**6**	**7**
(United States) L Raymond	2	6
(South Africa) **A Coetzer**	**6**	**6**
4	(Spain) A Sánchez Vicario	4	1
(Russia) E Likhovtseva	**7**	2	4
(Germany) **S Graf**	6	**6**	**6**
Q	(United States) B Rippner	4	1
2	(Switzerland) **M Hingis**	**6**	**6**

Quarterfinals
6	(France) **N Tauziat**	**6**	4	**6**
(South Africa) A Coetzer	3	**6**	4
(Germany) **S Graf**	**6**	4	**6**
2	(Switzerland) M Hingis	2	**6**	0

Semifinals
6	(France) N Tauziat	1	4
(Germany) **S Graf**	**6**	**6**
