= 1975 Virginia Slims of Philadelphia =

- Date: March 24 – 29
- Edition: 4th
- Category: Virginia Slims circuit
- Draw: 32S / 16D
- Prize money: $75,000
- Surface: Carpet (Sporteze) / indoor
- Location: Philadelphia, Pennsylvania, U.S.
- Venue: The Palestra
- Attendance: 25,685

Champions

Singles
- (United Kingdom) Virginia Wade

Doubles
- (Australia) Evonne Goolagong (Netherlands) Betty Stöve
← 1974 ·	Virginia Slims of Philadelphia	· 1976 →

The 1975 Virginia Slims of Philadelphia was a women's tennis tournament played on indoor carpet courts at the Palestra in Philadelphia, Pennsylvania in the United States that was part of the 1975 Virginia Slims World Championship Series. It was the fourth edition of the tournament and was held from March 24 through March 29, 1975. Fifth-seeded Virginia Wade won the singles title and earned $15,000 first-prize money.

== Finals ==
=== Singles ===
(United Kingdom) Virginia Wade defeated (United States) Chris Evert 7–5, 6–4

=== Doubles ===
(Australia) Evonne Goolagong / (Netherlands) Betty Stöve defeated (United States) Rosemary Casals / (United States) Billie Jean King 4–6, 6–4, 7–6^{(5–3)}

== Prize money ==
Event	W	F	SF	QF	Round of 16	Round of 32
Singles	$15,000	$8,500	$4,200	$2,100	$1,100	$550
