= 1979 Avon Championships of Philadelphia =

- Date: March 5–11
- Edition: 8th
- Category: Virginia Slims circuit
- Draw: 32S / 16D
- Prize money: $125,000
- Surface: Carpet (Sporteze) / indoor
- Location: Philadelphia, US
- Venue: The Palestra

Champions

Singles
- (Australia) Wendy Turnbull

Doubles
- (France) Françoise Dürr / (Netherlands) Betty Stöve
← 1978 ·	Virginia Slims of Philadelphia	· 1991 →

The 1979 Avon Championships of Philadelphia was a women's tennis tournament played on indoor carpet courts at the Palestra in Philadelphia, Pennsylvania in the United States that was part of the 1979 Avon Championships circuit. It was the eighth edition of the tournament and was held from March 5 through March 11, 1979. Fourth-seeded Wendy Turnbull won the singles title and earned $24,000 first-prize money.

== Finals ==
=== Singles ===
(Australia) Wendy Turnbull defeated (United Kingdom) Virginia Wade 5–7, 6–3, 6–2

- It was Turnbull's second title of the year and the fourth of her career.

=== Doubles ===
(France) Françoise Dürr / (Netherlands) Betty Stöve defeated (United States) Renée Richards / (United Kingdom) Virginia Wade 6–4, 6–2

== Prize money ==
Event	W	F	SF	QF	Round of 16	Round of 32
Singles	$24,000	$12,000	$6,000	$3,000	$1,600	$900
