= 1973 Max-Pax Coffee Classic =

- Date: April 3–8
- Edition: 2nd
- Category: Virginia Slims circuit
- Draw: 16S / 8D
- Prize money: $50,000
- Surface: Carpet (Sportface) / indoor
- Location: Philadelphia, Pennsylvania, U.S.
- Venue: Palestra
- Attendance: 14,042

Champions

Singles
- (Australia) Margaret Court

Doubles
- (Australia) Margaret Court (Australia) Lesley Hunt
- Virginia Slims of Philadelphia

The Max-Pax Coffee Classic, also known as the Virginia Slims of Philadelphia, was a women's tennis tournament played on indoor carpet courts at the Palestra in Philadelphia, Pennsylvania in the United States that was part of the 1973 Virginia Slims World Championship Series. It was the second edition of the tournament and was held from April 3 through April 8, 1973. First-seeded Margaret Court won the singles title and earned $12,000 first-prize money.

== Finals ==
=== Singles ===
(Australia) Margaret Court defeated (Australia) Kerry Harris 6–1, 6–0

=== Doubles ===
(Australia) Margaret Court / (Australia) Lesley Hunt defeated (France) Françoise Dürr / (Netherlands) Betty Stöve 6–1, 3–6, 6–2

== Prize money ==
Event	W	F	3rd	4th	QF	Round of 16
Singles	$12,000	$7,000	$3,500	$3,000	$1,800	$1,000
