= Advanta Championships of Philadelphia =

Tennis tournament in Pennsylvania, US

Tournament information
- Event name: Advanta Championships of Philadelphia
- Tour: WTA 125 (2026–)
- Founded: 1971
- Editions: 1
- Surface: Hard (i)
- Draw: 32S/8Q/8D
- Prize money: $115,000

The Advanta Championships of Philadelphia also long known as the Virginia Slims of Philadelphia was a WTA 125 tournaments affiliated women's clay court tennis tournament founded in professional tennis tournament for women played from 1970 through 2005 in Philadelphia, United States. The tournament was classified on the WTA Tour as a Tier I event from 1993 through 1995. It was classified as a Tier II event in 1991, 1992, and from 1996 through 2005. The tournament was played indoors, on carpet from 1991 through 2000, and on hard courts from 1971 through 1979 and from 2003 through 2005.

Past singles champions include Conchita Martínez, Margaret Court, Chris Evert, Monica Seles, Steffi Graf, Martina Hingis, Lindsay Davenport, and Amélie Mauresmo.

== Finals ==
=== Singles ===
Year	Cat.	Champions	Runners-up	Score
1970		(Australia) Margaret Court	(United States) Billie Jean King	6–3, 7–6
1971		(United States) Rosemary Casals	(France) Françoise Dürr	6–3, 3–6, 6–2
1972	Not held			
1973		(Australia) Margaret Court	(Australia) Kerry Harris	6–1, 6–0
1974		(Soviet Union) Olga Morozova	(United States) Billie Jean King	7–6^{(5–2)}, 6–1
1975		(United Kingdom) Virginia Wade	(United States) Chris Evert	7–5, 6–4
1976		(Australia) Evonne Goolagong Cawley	(United States) Chris Evert	6–3, 7–6
1977		(United States) Chris Evert	(Czechoslovakia) Martina Navratilova	6–4, 4–6, 6–3
1978		(United States) Chris Evert	(United States) Billie Jean King	6–0, 6–4
1979		(Australia) Wendy Turnbull	(United Kingdom) Virginia Wade	5–7, 6–3, 6–2
1980–1990	Not held			
1991	Tier II	(Socialist Federal Republic of Yugoslavia) Monica Seles	(United States) Jennifer Capriati	7–5, 6–1
1992	Tier II	(Germany) Steffi Graf	(Spain) Arantxa Sánchez Vicario	6–3, 3–6, 6–1
1993	Tier I	(Spain) Conchita Martínez	(Germany) Steffi Graf	6–3, 6–3
1994	Tier I	(Germany) Anke Huber	(France) Mary Pierce	6–0, 6–7, 7–5
1995	Tier I	(Germany) Steffi Graf	(United States) Lori McNeil	6–1, 4–6, 6–3
1996	Tier II	(Czech Republic) Jana Novotná	(Germany) Steffi Graf	6–4 (ret.)
1997	Tier II	(Switzerland) Martina Hingis	(United States) Lindsay Davenport	7–5, 6–7, 7–6
1998	Tier II	(Germany) Steffi Graf	(United States) Lindsay Davenport	4–6, 6–3, 6–4
1999	Tier II	(United States) Lindsay Davenport	(Switzerland) Martina Hingis	6–3, 6–4
2000	Tier II	(United States) Lindsay Davenport	(Switzerland) Martina Hingis	7–6, 6–4
2001–2002	Not held			
2003	Tier II	(France) Amélie Mauresmo	(Russia) Anastasia Myskina	5–7, 6–0, 6–2
2004	Tier II	(France) Amélie Mauresmo	(Russia) Vera Zvonareva	3–6, 6–2, 6–2
2005	Tier II	(France) Amélie Mauresmo	(Russia) Elena Dementieva	7–5, 2–6, 7–5

=== Doubles ===
Year	Cat.	Champions	Runners-up	Score
1971		(United States) Rosemary Casals (United States) Billie Jean King		(walkover)
1972	Not held			
1973		(Australia) Margaret Court (Australia) Lesley Hunt	(France) Françoise Dürr (Netherlands) Betty Stöve	6–1, 3–6, 6–2
1974		(United States) Rosemary Casals (United States) Billie Jean King	(Australia) Kerry Harris (Australia) Lesley Hunt	6–3, 7–6
1975		(Australia) Evonne Goolagong Cawley (Netherlands) Betty Stöve	(United States) Rosemary Casals (United States) Billie Jean King	4–6, 6–4, 7–6^{(5–3)}
1976		(United States) Billie Jean King (Netherlands) Betty Stöve	(United States) Rosemary Casals (France) Françoise Dürr	7–6, 6–4
1977		(France) Françoise Dürr (United Kingdom) Virginia Wade	(Czechoslovakia) Martina Navratilova (Netherlands) Betty Stöve	6–4, 4–6, 6–4
1978		(Australia) Kerry Melville Reid (Australia) Wendy Turnbull	(France) Françoise Dürr (United Kingdom) Virginia Wade	6–3, 7–5
1979		(France) Françoise Dürr (Netherlands) Betty Stöve	(United States) Renée Richards (United Kingdom) Virginia Wade	6–4, 6–2
1980–1990	Not held			
1991	Tier II	(Czechoslovakia) Jana Novotná (Latvia) Larisa Savchenko Neiland	(United States) Mary Joe Fernández (United States) Zina Garrison Jackson	6–2, 6–4
1992	Tier II	(United States) Gigi Fernández (Belarus) Natasha Zvereva	(Spain) Conchita Martínez (France) Mary Pierce	6–1, 6–3
1993	Tier I	(United States) Katrina Adams (Netherlands) Manon Bollegraf	(Spain) Conchita Martínez (Latvia) Larisa Savchenko Neiland	6–2, 4–6, 7–6
1994	Tier I	(United States) Gigi Fernández (Belarus) Natasha Zvereva	(Argentina) Gabriela Sabatini (Netherlands) Brenda Schultz-McCarthy	4–6, 6–4, 6–2
1995	Tier I	(United States) Lori McNeil (Czechoslovakia) Helena Suková	(United States) Meredith McGrath (Latvia) Larisa Savchenko Neiland	4–6, 6–3, 6–4
1996	Tier II	(United States) Lisa Raymond (Australia) Rennae Stubbs	(United States) Nicole Arendt (United States) Lori McNeil	6–4, 3–6, 6–3
1997	Tier II	(United States) Lisa Raymond (Australia) Rennae Stubbs	(United States) Lindsay Davenport (Czech Republic) Jana Novotná	6–3, 7–5
1998	Tier II	(Russia) Elena Likhovtseva (Japan) Ai Sugiyama	(United States) Monica Seles (Belarus) Natasha Zvereva	7–5, 4–6, 6–2
1999	Tier II	(United States) Lisa Raymond (Australia) Rennae Stubbs	(United States) Chanda Rubin (France) Sandrine Testud	6–1, 7–6
2000	Tier II	(Switzerland) Martina Hingis (Russia) Anna Kournikova	(United States) Lisa Raymond (Australia) Rennae Stubbs	6–2, 7–5
2001–2002	Not held			
2003	Tier II	(United States) Martina Navratilova (United States) Lisa Raymond	(Zimbabwe) Cara Black (Australia) Rennae Stubbs	6–3, 6–4
2004	Tier II	(Australia) Alicia Molik (United States) Lisa Raymond	(South Africa) Liezel Huber (United States) Corina Morariu	7–5, 6–4
2005	Tier II	(Zimbabwe) Cara Black (Australia) Rennae Stubbs	(United States) Lisa Raymond (Australia) Samantha Stosur	6–4, 7–6

== See also ==
- Sports in Philadelphia
- WTA Tier I Events
