= Conchita Martínez career statistics =

Career finals
Discipline	Type	Won	Lost	Total	WR
Singles
Singles	Grand Slam	1	2	3	0.33
Singles	WTA Finals (Note: Formerly known as: Virginia Slims Championships (until 1995); WTA Tour Championships (until 2014))	–	–	–	–
Singles	Olympics	–	–	–	–
Singles	WTA 1000 (Note: Formerly known as: Category 4 & 5 & 6 (until 1990); Tier I (until 2009); WTA Premier Mandatory and 5 (until 2021))	9	5	14	0.64
Singles	WTA 500 (Note: Formerly known as: Category 3 (until 1990); Tier II (until 2009); WTA Premier (until 2021))	7	9	16	0.44
Singles	WTA 250 (Note: Formerly known as: Category 1 & 2 (until 1990); Tier III & IV & V (until 2009); WTA International (until 2021))	16	6	22	0.73
Singles	Total	33	22	55	0.60
Doubles
Doubles	Grand Slam	0	2	2	0.00
Doubles	WTA Finals	–	–	–	–
Doubles	Olympics	0	2	2	0.00
Doubles	WTA 1000	5	9	14	0.36
Doubles	WTA 500	5	10	15	0.33
Doubles	WTA 250	3	5	8	0.38
Doubles	Total	13	28	41	0.32
Total		46	50	96	0.48

This is a list of the main career statistics of tennis player Conchita Martínez.

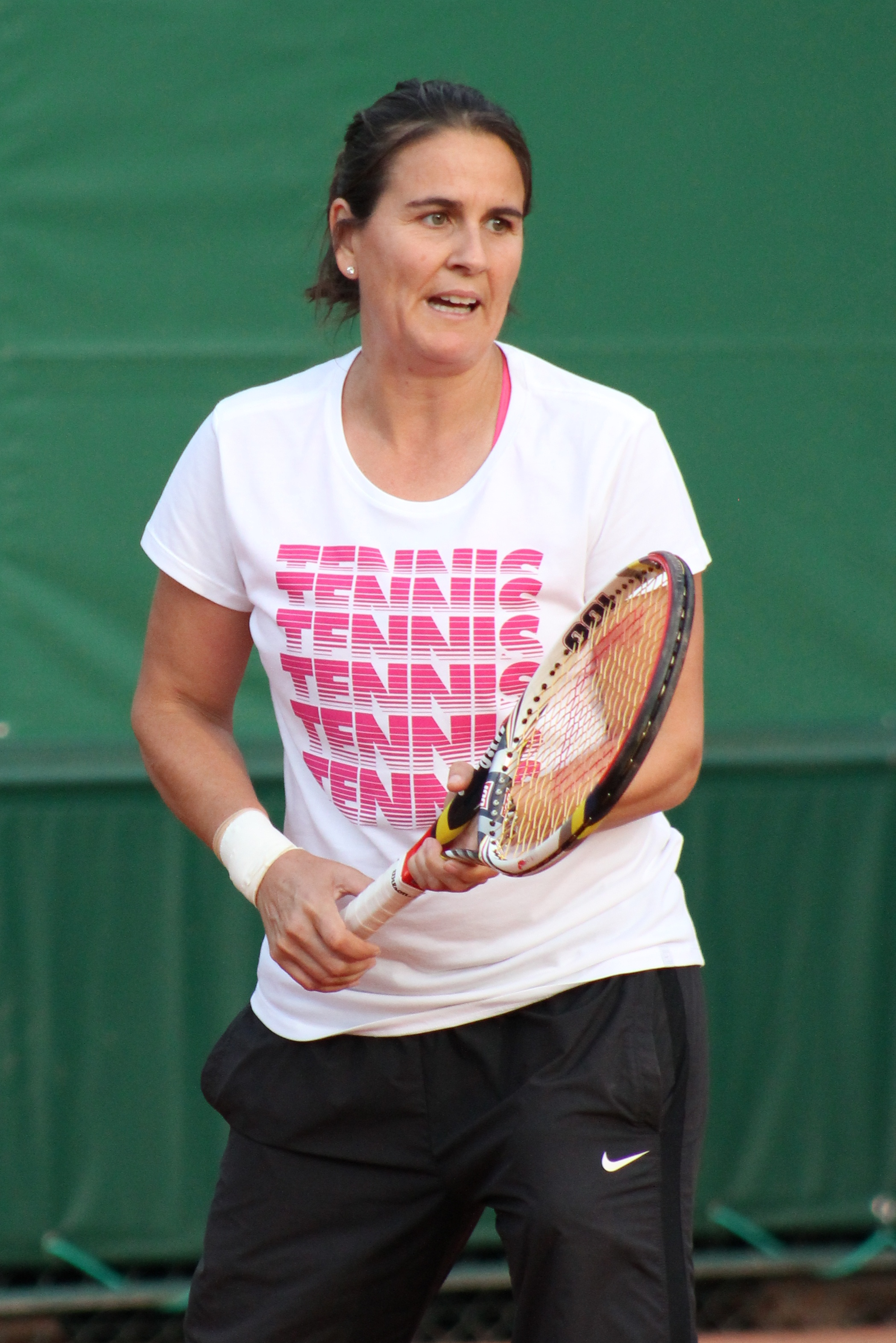
Martínez at the 2013 French Open.

== Performance timelines ==
Key
W	F	SF	QF	#R	RR	Q#	P#	DNQ	A	Z#	PO	G	S	B	NMS	NTI	P	NH

(W) winner; (F) finalist; (SF) semifinalist; (QF) quarterfinalist; (#R) rounds 4, 3, 2, 1; (RR) round-robin stage; (Q#) qualification round; (P#) preliminary round; (DNQ) did not qualify; (A) absent; (Z#) Davis/Fed Cup Zonal Group (with number indication) or (PO) play-off; (G) gold, (S) silver or (B) bronze Olympic/Paralympic medal; (NMS) not a Masters tournament; (NTI) not a Tier I tournament; (P) postponed; (NH) not held; (SR) strike rate (events won / competed); (W–L) win–loss record.

=== Singles ===
Tournament	1988	1989	1990	1991	1992	1993	1994	1995	1996	1997	1998	1999	2000	2001	2002	2003	2004	2005	SR	W–L	Win %
Grand Slam tournaments
Australian Open	A	2R	A	A	4R	4R	QF	SF	QF	4R	F	3R	SF	2R	2R	1R	1R	1R	0 / 15	38–15	72%
French Open	4R	QF	QF	QF	QF	QF	SF	SF	SF	4R	4R	QF	F	3R	2R	QF	2R	1R	0 / 18	62–18	78%
Wimbledon	A	A	A	A	2R	SF	W	SF	4R	3R	3R	3R	2R	QF	3R	3R	1R	3R	1 / 14	38–13	75%
US Open	1R	4R	3R	QF	1R	4R	3R	SF	SF	3R	4R	4R	3R	A	2R	2R	1R	1R	0 / 17	36–17	68%
Win–loss	3–2	8–3	6–2	8–2	8–4	15–4	18–3	20–4	17–4	10–4	14–4	11–4	14–4	7–3	5–4	7–4	1–4	2–4	1 / 64	174–63	73%
Year-end championships
WTA Finals^{1}	A	1R	QF	1R	QF	QF	QF	QF	QF	1R	1R	1R	QF	A	A	A	A	A	0 / 12	7–12	37%
Grand Slam Cup	not held										QF	DNQ	not held						0 / 1	0–1	0%
National representation
Billie Jean King Cup	QF	F	SF	W	F	W	W	W	F	A	W	A	F	RR	F	QF	SF	A	5 / 15	47–18	72%
Olympic Games	A	not held			QF	not held			QF	not held			2R	not held			1R	NH	0 / 4	7–4	64%
WTA 1000 tournaments + former
Indian Wells Open	NH	T3	Tier II						F	QF	QF	3R	QF	2R	2R	SF	QF	QF	0 / 10	22–10	69%
Miami Open	A	A	SF	A	A	A	A	A	A	A	4R	3R	4R	A	2R	A	A	A	0 / 5	10–5	67%
Italian Open	C3	C5	QF	SF	A	W	W	W	W	F	3R	3R	A	SF	2R	QF	3R	QF	4 / 14	43–10	81%
Canadian Open	Cat. 5		A	A	A	A	A	A	A	SF	QF	3R	SF	A	A	A	A	3R	0 / 5	11–5	69%
Pan Pacific Open	Cat. 4		Tier II			A	A	QF	SF	QF	A	A	A	A	A	A	A	A	0 / 3	4–3	57%
Florida Slims^{2}	Cat. 5		T2	2R	F	Tier II			not held										0 / 2	4–2	67%
Charleston Open^{2}	Cat. 5		QF	A	F	A	W	W	SF	SF	2R	3R	SF	SF	2R	3R	F	1R	2 / 14	36–12	75%
Berlin Open^{2}	A	A	QF	A	A	SF	A	A	A	3R	W	3R	W	QF	2R	1R	1R	3R	2 / 11	23–9	72%
San Diego Open^{2}	C2	C3	Tier III			Tier II											3R	1R	0 / 2	2–2	50%
Kremlin Cup^{2}	not held								T3	SF	QF	1R	A	A	A	A	A	A	0 / 3	3–3	50%
Zurich Open^{2}	C3	C4	Tier II			A	A	A	2R	A	2R	A	A	A	SF	1R	A	1R	0 / 5	3–5	38%
Philadelphia Championships^{2}	not held			Tier II		W	1R	QF	Tier II					not held		Tier II			1 / 3	6–2	75%
Win–loss	0–0	0–0	10-4	3-2	8-2	13-1	10-1	12-2	13-4	16-7	13-7	10-7	15-4	8-4	7-6	9-5	11=5	9-7	9 / 77	167–68	71%
Career statistics
	1988	1989	1990	1991	1992	1993	1994	1995	1996	1997	1998	1999	2000	2001	2002	2003	2004	2005	SR	W–L	Win %
Tournaments	7	12	13	15	18	18	18	16	19	19	19	23	21	13	24	21	17	20	Career total: 313		
Titles	1	3	3	3	1	5	4	6	2	0	2	1	1	0	0	0	0	1	Career total: 33		
Finals	1	5	3	3	5	8	4	7	4	2	4	1	4	0	1	1	1	1	Career total: 55		
Overall win–loss^{3}	16–7	38–10	42–10	40–13	50–19	71–13	55–16	63–11	51–18	37–19	40–21	38–22	51–23	20–15	28–26	30–21	21–17	28–19	33 / 313	719–300	71%
Year-end ranking	40	7	11	9	8	4	3	2	5	12	8	15	5	35	34	18	42	32	$11,527,976		

=== Doubles ===
Tournament	1988	1989	1990	1991	1992	1993	1994	1995	1996	1997	1998	1999	2000	2001	2002	2003	2004	2005	SR	W–L
Grand Slam tournaments
Australian Open	A	A	A	A	A	QF	3R	3R	3R	QF	SF	1R	2R	1R	SF	QF	3R	1R	0 / 13	26–13
French Open	A	A	3R	A	F	QF	1R	3R	3R	QF	QF	3R	QF	F	1R	1R	QF	3R	0 / 15	33–15
Wimbledon	A	A	A	A	2R	A	1R	QF	3R	1R	1R	2R	2R	3R	3R	QF	3R	3R	0 / 13	19–13
US Open	A	1R	A	2R	3R	A	3R	QF	3R	QF	1R	3R	QF	A	3R	QF	QF	SF	0 / 14	29–14
Win–loss	0–0	0–1	2–1	1–1	8–3	6–2	4–4	10–4	8–4	8–4	6–4	5–4	7–4	7–3	8–4	9–4	10–4	8–4	0 / 55	107–55
Year-end championship
WTA Finals^{1}	A	A	A	A	A	A	A	QF	A	QF	QF	QF	A	A	A	A	A	SF	0 / 5	0–5
WTA 1000 tournaments + former
Indian Wells Open	NH	T3	Tier II						2R	1R	2R	SF	QF	1R	1R	2R	QF	QF	0 / 10	12–10
Miami Open	A	A	2R	A	A	A	A	A	3R	A	SF	3R	A	A	2R	A	A	A	0 / 5	7–5
Italian Open	C3	C5	1R	A	A	A	1R	F	SF	F	QF	2R	A	SF	F	A	SF	QF	0 / 11	25–11
Canadian Open	Cat. 5		A	A	A	A	A	A	A	2R	SF	1R	1R	A	A	A	A	F	1 / 5	7–5
Pan Pacific Open	Cat. 4		Tier II			A	A	SF	1R	SF	A	A	A	A	A	A	A	A	0 / 3	4–3
Florida Slims^{2}	Cat. 5		T2	1R	F	Tier II			not held										0 / 2	4–2
Charleston Open^{2}	Cat. 5		1R	A	SF	A	1R	QF	1R	QF	W	2R	F	1R	SF	F	A	W	2 / 13	26–11
Berlin Open^{2}	A	A	1R	A	A	2R^{4}	A	A	A	A	QF	A	W	SF	2R	2R	F	QF	1 / 9	16–7
San Diego Open^{2}	C2	C3	Tier III			Tier II											2R	W	1 / 2	5–1
Kremlin Cup^{2}	not held								T3	QF	QF	1R	A	A	A	A	A	A	0 / 3	2–3
Zurich Open^{2}	C3	C4	Tier II			A	A	A	QF	SF	QF	A	A	A	1R	QF	A	QF	0 / 6	5–6
Philadelphia Championships^{2}	not held			Tier II		F	SF	1R	Tier II					not held		Tier II			0 / 3	5–3
Career statistics
Overall win–loss^{3}																				
Year-end ranking	147	67	106	51	8	10	41	17	28	19	16	24	29	19	16	21	14	9		

Notes

- ^{1} Formerly known as WTA Tour Championships until 2014.
- ^{2} The WTA 1000 category was previously known as Premier Mandatory & Premier 5 (until 2021), and before that as Tier I (until 2009). This note covers tournaments that have since been downgraded to a lower category or are no longer held.
- ^{3} Only main-draw results in WTA Tour, Grand Slam tournaments, Billie Jean King Cup (Fed Cup), United Cup, Hopman Cup and Olympic Games are included in win–loss records.
- ^{4} Defaulted.

== Grand Slams tournament finals ==
=== Singles: 3 (1 title, 2 runner-ups) ===
Result	Year	Tournament	Surface	Opponent	Score
Win	1994	Wimbledon	Grass	(United States) Martina Navratilova	6–4, 3–6, 6–3
Loss	1998	Australian Open	Hard	(Switzerland) Martina Hingis	3–6, 3–6
Loss	2000	French Open	Clay	(France) Mary Pierce	2–6, 5–7

=== Doubles: 2 (runner-ups) ===
Result	Year	Tournament	Surface	Partner	Opponents	Score
Loss	1992	French Open	Clay	(Spain) Arantxa Sánchez Vicario	(United States) Gigi Fernández (Belarus) Natasha Zvereva	3–6, 2–6
Loss	2001	French Open	Clay	(Serbia and Montenegro) Jelena Dokic	(Spain) Virginia Ruano Pascual (Argentina) Paola Suárez	2–6, 1–6

== Other significant finals ==
=== WTA 1000 tournaments ===
==== Singles: 14 (9 titles, 5 runner-ups) ====
Result	Year	Tournament	Surface	Opponent	Score
Loss	1992	Virginia Slims of Florida	Hard	(Germany) Steffi Graf	6–3, 2–6, 0–6
Loss	1992	Charleston Open	Clay	(Argentina) Gabriela Sabatini	1–6, 4–6
Win	1993	Italian Open	Clay	(Argentina) Gabriela Sabatini	7–5, 6–1
Win	1993	Virginia Slims of Philadelphia	Carpet (i)	(Germany) Steffi Graf	6–3, 6–3
Win	1994	Charleston Open	Clay	(Belarus) Natasha Zvereva	6–4, 6–0
Win	1994	Italian Open (2)	Clay	(United States) Martina Navratilova	7–6^{(7–4)}, 6–4
Win	1995	Charleston Open (2)	Clay	(Bulgaria) Magdalena Maleeva	6–1, 6–1
Win	1995	Italian Open (3)	Clay	(Spain) Arantxa Sánchez Vicario	6–3, 6–1
Loss	1996	Indian Wells Open	Hard	(Germany) Steffi Graf	6–7^{(5–7)}, 6–7^{(5–7)}
Win	1996	Italian Open (4)	Clay	(Switzerland) Martina Hingis	6–2, 6–3
Loss	1997	Italian Open	Clay	(France) Mary Pierce	4–6, 0–6
Win	1998	German Open	Clay	(France) Amélie Mauresmo	6–4, 6–4
Win	2000	German Open (2)	Clay	(South Africa) Amanda Coetzer	6–0, 6–3
Loss	2004	Charleston Open	Clay	(United States) Venus Williams	6–2, 2–6, 1–6

=== Summer Olympics ===
==== Doubles: 3 (2 silver medals, 1 bronze medal) ====
Result	Year	Tournament	Surface	Partner	Opponents	Score
Silver	1992	Barcelona Olympics, Spain	Clay	(Spain) Arantxa Sánchez Vicario	(United States) Gigi Fernández (United States) Mary Joe Fernández	5–7, 6–2, 2–6
Bronze	1996	Atlanta Olympics, United States	Hard	(Spain) Arantxa Sánchez Vicario	(Netherlands) Manon Bollegraf (Netherlands) Brenda Schultz-McCarthy	6–3, 6–1
Silver	2004	Athens Olympics, Greece	Hard	(Spain) Virginia Ruano Pascual	(China) Li Ting (China) Sun Tiantian	3–6, 3–6

== WTA Tour finals ==
=== Singles: 55 (33 titles, 22 runner-ups) ===
Legend Grand Slam (1–2) WTA 1000 (Tier I) (9–5) WTA 500 (Tier II) (7–9) WTA 250 (Tier III / Tier IV / Tier V) (16–6)	Finals by surface Hard (11–10) Grass (1–1) Clay (19–9) Carpet (2–2)

Result	W–L	Date	Tournament	Tier	Surface	Opponent	Score
Win	1–0	Aug 1988	Sofia, Bulgaria	Category 2	Hard (i)	(Austria) Barbara Paulus	6–1, 6–2
Win	2–0	Feb 1989	Wellington, New Zealand	Category 1	Hard	(Australia) Jo-Anne Faull	6–1, 6–2
Win	3–0	Apr 1989	Tampa, US	Category 3	Clay	(Argentina) Gabriela Sabatini	6–3, 6–2
Loss	3–1	May 1989	Geneva, Switzerland	Category 2	Clay	(Bulgaria) Manuela Maleeva-Fragniere	4–6, 0–6
Win	4–1	Sep 1989	Phoenix, US	Category 2	Hard	(United States) Elise Burgin	3–6, 6–4, 6–2
Loss	4–2	Oct 1989	Bayonne, France	Category 2	Hard (i)	(Bulgaria) Katerina Maleeva	2–6, 2–6
Win	5–2	Sep 1990	Paris, France	Tier IV	Clay	(Argentina) Patricia Tarabini	7–5, 6–3
Win	6–2	Oct 1990	Scottsdale, US	Tier IV	Hard	(United States) Marianne Werdel	7–5, 6–1
Win	7–2	Nov 1990	Indianapolis, US	Tier IV	Hard (i)	(Soviet Union) Leila Meskhi	6–4, 6–2
Win	8–2	Apr 1991	Barcelona, Spain	Tier III	Clay	(Switzerland) Manuela Maleeva-Fragniere	6–4, 6–1
Win	9–2	Jul 1991	Kitzbühel, Austria	Tier IV	Clay	(Austria) Judith Wiesner	6–1, 2–6, 6–3
Win	10–2	Sep 1991	Paris, France	Tier IV	Clay	(Argentina) Inés Gorrochategui	6–0, 6–3
Loss	10–3	Mar 1992	Indian Wells, US	Tier II	Hard	(Federal Republic of Yugoslavia) Monica Seles	3–6, 1–6
Loss	10–4	Mar 1992	Boca Raton, US	Tier I	Hard	(Germany) Steffi Graf	6–3, 2–6, 0–6
Loss	10–5	Mar 1992	Hilton Head, US	Tier I	Clay	(Argentina) Gabriela Sabatini	1–6, 4–6
Win	11–5	Jul 1992	Kitzbühel, Austria	Tier IV	Clay	(Switzerland) Manuela Maleeva-Fragniere	6–0, 3–6, 6–2
Loss	11–6	Aug 1992	San Diego, US	Tier III	Hard	(United States) Jennifer Capriati	3–6, 2–6
Win	12–6	Jan 1993	Brisbane, Australia	Tier III	Hard	(Bulgaria) Magdalena Maleeva	6–3, 6–4
Loss	12–7	Feb 1993	Linz, Austria	Tier III	Carpet	(Switzerland) Manuela Maleeva-Fragniere	2–6, 0–1 ret.
Win	13–7	Mar 1993	Houston, US	Tier II	Clay	(Germany) Sabine Hack	6–3, 6–2
Loss	13–8	Apr 1993	Barcelona, Spain	Tier II	Clay	(Spain) Arantxa Sánchez Vicario	1–6, 4–6
Win	14–8	May 1993	Rome, Italy	Tier I	Clay	(Argentina) Gabriela Sabatini	7–5, 6–1
Win	15–8	Jul 1993	Stratton Mountain, US	Tier II	Hard	(United States) Zina Garrison	6–3, 6–2
Loss	15–9	Oct 1993	Essen, Germany	Tier II	Carpet	(Ukraine) Natalia Medvedeva	7–6^{(7–4)}, 5–7, 4–6
Win	16–9	Nov 1993	Philadelphia, US	Tier I	Carpet	(Germany) Steffi Graf	6–3, 6–3
Win	17–9	Mar 1994	Hilton Head, US	Tier I	Clay	(Belarus) Natasha Zvereva	6–4, 6–0
Win	18–9	May 1994	Rome, Italy	Tier I	Clay	(United States) Martina Navratilova	7–6^{(7–4)}, 6–4
Win	19–9	Jun 1994	Wimbledon	Grand Slam	Grass	(United States) Martina Navratilova	6–4, 3–6, 6–3
Win	20–9	Jul 1994	Stratton Mountain, US	Tier II	Hard	(Spain) Arantxa Sánchez Vicario	4–6, 6–3, 6–4
Loss	20–10	Mar 1995	Delray Beach, US	Tier II	Hard	(Germany) Steffi Graf	2–6, 4–6
Win	21–10	Mar 1995	Hilton Head, US	Tier I	Clay	(Bulgaria) Magdalena Maleeva	6–1, 6–1
Win	22–10	Apr 1995	Amelia Island, US	Tier II	Clay	(Argentina) Gabriela Sabatini	6–1, 6–4
Win	23–10	May 1995	Hamburg, Germany	Tier II	Clay	(Switzerland) Martina Hingis	6–1, 6–0
Win	24–10	May 1995	Rome, Italy	Tier I	Clay	(Spain) Arantxa Sánchez Vicario	6–3, 6–1
Win	25–10	Jul 1995	San Diego, US	Tier II	Hard	(United States) Lisa Raymond	6–2, 6–0
Win	26–10	Aug 1995	Manhattan Beach, US	Tier II	Hard	(United States) Chanda Rubin	4–6, 6–1, 6–3
Loss	26–11	Mar 1996	Indian Wells, US	Tier I	Hard	(Germany) Steffi Graf	6–7^{(5–7)}, 6–7^{(5–7)}
Loss	26–12	Apr 1996	Hamburg, Germany	Tier II	Clay	(Spain) Arantxa Sánchez Vicario	6–4, 6–7^{(4–7)}, 0–6
Win	27–12	May 1996	Rome, Italy	Tier I	Clay	(Switzerland) Martina Hingis	6–2, 6–3
Win	28–12	Oct 1996	Moscow, Russia	Tier III	Carpet	(Austria) Barbara Paulus	6–1, 4–6, 6–4
Loss	28–13	May 1997	Rome, Italy	Tier I	Clay	(France) Mary Pierce	4–6, 0–6
Loss	28–14	Jul 1997	Stanford, US	Tier II	Hard	(Switzerland) Martina Hingis	0–6, 2–6
Loss	28–15	Jan 1998	Australian Open	Grand Slam	Hard	(Switzerland) Martina Hingis	3–6, 3–6
Loss	28–16	Apr 1998	Amelia Island, US	Tier II	Clay	(France) Mary Pierce	7–6^{(10–8)}, 0–6, 2–6
Win	29–16	May 1998	Berlin, Germany	Tier I	Clay	(France) Amélie Mauresmo	6–4, 6–4
Win	30–16	Jul 1998	Warsaw, Poland	Tier III	Clay	(Italy) Silvia Farina Elia	6–0, 6–3
Win	31–16	Jul 1999	Sopot, Poland	Tier III	Clay	(Slovakia) Karina Habšudová	6–1, 6–1
Loss	31–17	Jan 2000	Gold Coast, Australia	Tier III	Hard	(Croatia) Silvija Talaja	0–6, 6–0, 4–6
Loss	31–18	Apr 2000	Amelia Island, US	Tier II	Clay	(United States) Monica Seles	3–6, 2–6
Win	32–18	May 2000	Berlin, Germany	Tier I	Clay	(South Africa) Amanda Coetzer	6–0, 6–3
Loss	32–19	Jun 2000	French Open	Grand Slam	Clay	(France) Mary Pierce	2–6, 5–7
Loss	32–20	Sep 2002	Bali, Indonesia	Tier III	Hard	(Russia) Svetlana Kuznetsova	6–3, 6–7^{(5–7)}, 5–7
Loss	32–21	Jun 2003	Eastbourne, UK	Tier II	Grass	(United States) Chanda Rubin	4–6, 6–3, 4–6
Loss	32–22	Apr 2004	Charleston, US	Tier I	Clay	(United States) Venus Williams	6–2, 2–6, 1–6
Win	33–22	Jan 2005	Pattaya, Thailand	Tier IV	Hard	(Germany) Anna-Lena Grönefeld	6–3, 3–6, 6–3

=== Doubles: 39 (13 titles, 26 runner-ups) ===
Legend Grand Slam (0–2) WTA 1000 (Tier I) (5–9) WTA 500 (Tier II) (5–10) WTA 250 (Tier III / Tier IV / Tier V) (3–5)	Finals by surface Hard (6–12) Clay (7–12) Carpet (0–4)

Result	W–L	Date	Tournament	Tier	Surface	Partner	Opponents	Score
Win	1–0	Aug 1988	Sofia, Bulgaria	Category 2	Hard (i)	(Austria) Barbara Paulus	(Croatia) Sabrina Goleš (Bulgaria) Katerina Maleeva	1–6, 6–1, 6–4
Loss	1–1	Jul 1989	Estoril, Portugal	Category 2	Clay	(Argentina) Gaby Castro	(Czech Republic) Iva Budařová (Czech Republic) Regina Rajchrtová	6–2, 6–4
Loss	1–2	Mar 1992	Boca Raton, US	Tier I	Hard	(United States) Linda Wild	(Latvia) Larisa Neiland (Belarus) Natasha Zvereva	6–2, 6–2
Win	2–2	Apr 1992	Barcelona, Spain	Tier III	Clay	(Spain) Arantxa Sánchez Vicario	(France) Nathalie Tauziat (Austria) Judith Wiesner	6–4, 6–1
Loss	2–3	May 1992	French Open	Grand Slam	Clay	(Spain) Arantxa Sánchez Vicario	(United States) Gigi Fernández (Belarus) Natasha Zvereva	6–3, 6–2
Loss	2–4	Aug 1992	San Diego, US	Tier III	Hard	(Argentina) Mercedes Paz	(Czech Republic) Jana Novotná (Latvia) Larisa Neiland	6–1, 6–4
Loss	2–5	Oct 1992	Brighton, UK	Tier II	Carpet (i)	(Slovakia) Radka Zrubáková	(Latvia) Larisa Neiland (Czechoslovakia) Jana Novotná	6–4, 6–1
Loss	2–6	Nov 1992	Philadelphia, US	Tier II	Carpet (i)	(France) Mary Pierce	(United States) Gigi Fernández (Belarus) Natasha Zvereva	6–1, 6–3
Win	3–6	Jan 1993	Brisbane, Australia	Tier III	Hard	(Latvia) Larisa Neiland	(United States) Kimberly Po (United States) Shannan McCarthy	6–2, 6–2
Loss	3–7	Feb 1993	Linz, Austria	Tier III	Carpet (i)	(Austria) Judith Wiesner	(Russia) Eugenia Maniokova (Georgia (country)) Leila Meskhi	w/o
Win	4–7	Apr 1993	Barcelona, Spain	Tier II	Clay	(Spain) Arantxa Sánchez Vicario	(Bulgaria) Magdalena Maleeva (Switzerland) Manuela Maleeva-Fragniere	4–6, 6–1, 6–0
Loss	4–8	Nov 1993	Philadelphia, US	Tier I	Carpet (i)	(Latvia) Larisa Neiland	(Netherlands) Manon Bollegraf (United States) Katrina Adams	6–2, 4–6, 7–6^{(9–7)}
Loss	4–9	Jul 1994	Stratton Mountain, US	Tier II	Hard	(Spain) Arantxa Sánchez Vicario	(United States) Pam Shriver (Australia) Elizabeth Smylie	7–6^{(7–4)}, 2–6, 7–5
Loss	4–10	May 1995	Hamburg, Germany	Tier II	Clay	(Argentina) Patricia Tarabini	(United States) Gigi Fernández (Switzerland) Martina Hingis	6–2, 6–3
Loss	4–11	May 1995	Rome, Italy	Tier I	Clay	(Argentina) Patricia Tarabini	(United States) Gigi Fernández (Belarus) Natalia Zvereva	3–6, 7–6^{(7–3)}, 6–4
Win	5–11	Aug 1996	San Diego, US	Tier II	Hard	(United States) Gigi Fernández	(Spain) Arantxa Sánchez Vicario (Latvia) Larisa Neiland	4–6, 6–3, 6–4
Loss	5–12	May 1997	Rome, Italy	Tier I	Clay	(Argentina) Patricia Tarabini	(United States) Nicole Arendt (Netherlands) Manon Bollegraf	6–2, 6–4
Loss	5–13	Jul 1997	Stanford, US	Tier II	Hard	(Argentina) Patricia Tarabini	(United States) Lindsay Davenport (Switzerland) Martina Hingis	6–1, 6–3
Win	6–13	Apr 1998	Hilton Head, US	Tier I	Clay	(Argentina) Patricia Tarabini	(United States) Lisa Raymond (Australia) Rennae Stubbs	3–6, 6–4, 6–4
Win	7–13	Apr 1999	Amelia Island, US	Tier II	Clay	(Argentina) Patricia Tarabini	(United States) Lisa Raymond (Australia) Rennae Stubbs	7–5, 0–6, 6–4
Win	8–13	Sep 1999	Tokyo, Japan	Tier I	Hard	(Argentina) Patricia Tarabini	(South Africa) Amanda Coetzer (Australia) Jelena Dokić	6–7^{(5–7)}, 6–4, 6–2
Loss	8–14	Apr 2000	Hilton Head, US	Tier I	Clay	(Argentina) Patricia Tarabini	(Spain) Virginia Ruano Pascual (Argentina) Paola Suárez	7–5, 6–3
Win	9–14	May 2000	Berlin, Germany	Tier I	Clay	(Spain) Arantxa Sánchez Vicario	(United States) Corina Morariu (South Africa) Amanda Coetzer	3–6, 6–2, 7–6^{(9–7)}
Win	10–14	Apr 2001	Amelia Island, US	Tier II	Clay	(Argentina) Patricia Tarabini	(United States) Martina Navratilova (Spain) Arantxa Sánchez Vicario	6–4, 6–2
Loss	10–15	May 2001	French Open	Grand Slam	Clay	(Federal Republic of Yugoslavia) Jelena Dokić	(Spain) Virginia Ruano Pascual (Argentina) Paola Suárez	6–2, 6–1
Loss	10–16	Apr 2002	Sarasota, US	Tier IV	Clay	(Belgium) Els Callens	(Federal Republic of Yugoslavia) Jelena Dokić (Russia) Elena Likhovtseva	6–7^{(5–7)}, 6–3, 6–3
Loss	10–17	May 2002	Rome, Italy	Tier I	Clay	(Argentina) Patricia Tarabini	(Spain) Virginia Ruano Pascual (Argentina) Paola Suárez	6–3, 6–4
Loss	10–18	Jul 2002	Stanford, US	Tier II	Hard	(Slovakia) Janette Husárová	(Australia) Rennae Stubbs (United States) Lisa Raymond	6–1, 6–1
Loss	10–19	Jan 2003	Sydney, Australia	Tier II	Hard	(Australia) Rennae Stubbs	(Belgium) Kim Clijsters (Japan) Ai Sugiyama	6–3, 6–3
Loss	10–20	Apr 2003	Charleston, US	Tier I	Clay	(Slovakia) Janette Husárová	(Spain) Virginia Ruano Pascual (Argentina) Paola Suárez	6–0, 6–3
Win	11–20	Feb 2004	Dubai, UAE	Tier II	Hard	(Slovakia) Janette Husárová	(Russia) Svetlana Kuznetsova (Russia) Elena Likhovtseva	6–0, 1–6, 6–3
Loss	11–21	Mar 2004	Doha, Qatar	Tier II	Hard	(Slovakia) Janette Husárová	(Russia) Svetlana Kuznetsova (Russia) Elena Likhovtseva	7–6^{(7–4)}, 6–2
Loss	11–22	May 2004	Berlin, Germany	Tier I	Clay	(Slovakia) Janette Husárová	(Russia) Nadia Petrova (United States) Meghann Shaughnessy	6–2, 2–6, 6–1
Loss	11–23	Jul 2004	Los Angeles, US	Tier II	Hard	(Spain) Virginia Ruano Pascual	(Russia) Nadia Petrova (United States) Meghann Shaughnessy	6–7^{(2–7)}, 6–4, 6–3
Win	12–23	Apr 2005	Charleston, US	Tier I	Clay	(Spain) Virginia Ruano Pascual	(Czech Republic) Iveta Benešová (Czech Republic) Květa Peschke	6–1, 6–4
Win	13–23	Aug 2005	San Diego, US	Tier I	Hard	(Spain) Virginia Ruano Pascual	(Slovakia) Daniela Hantuchová (Japan) Ai Sugiyama	6–7^{(7–9)}, 6–1, 7–5
Loss	13–24	Aug 2005	Toronto, Canada	Tier I	Hard	(Spain) Virginia Ruano Pascual	(Germany) Anna-Lena Grönefeld (United States) Martina Navratilova	5–7, 6–3, 6–4
Loss	13–25	Oct 2005	Bangkok, Thailand	Tier III	Hard	(Spain) Virginia Ruano Pascual	(Japan) Shinobu Asagoe (Argentina) Gisela Dulko	6–1, 7–5
Loss	13–26	Oct 2005	Linz, Austria	Tier II	Hard (i)	(Spain) Virginia Ruano Pascual	(Argentina) Gisela Dulko (Czech Republic) Květa Peschke	6–2, 6–3

== ITF Circuit finals ==
=== Singles: 5 (4 titles, 1 runner-up) ===
Legend
10K tournaments

Result	W–L	Date	Tournament	Tier	Surface	Opponent	Score
Loss	0–1	Sep 1986	ITF Murcia, Spain	10K	Clay	(Spain) Ana Segura	5–7, 1–6
Win	1–1	Feb 1988	ITF Rocafort, Spain	10K	Clay	(France) Catherine Mothes-Jobkel	6–0, 6–3
Win	2–1	Mar 1988	ITF Castellón, Spain	10K	Clay	(Spain) Ana Segura	6–1, 6–2
Win	3–1	Apr 1988	ITF Reggio Calabria, Italy	10K	Clay	(Australia) Rachel McQuillan	6–1, 6–2
Win	4–1	Dec 1997	ITF Mallorca, Spain	10K	Clay	(Spain) Eva Bes	6–3, 5–7, 6–3

=== Doubles: 2 (titles) ===
Legend
25K tournaments

Result	W–L	Date	Tournament	Tier	Surface	Partner	Opponents	Score
Win	1–0	Jun 1989	ITF Modena, Italy	25K	Clay	(Argentina) Gaby Castro	(Argentina) Debora Garat (Argentina) Florencia Labat	6–3, 6–2
Win	2–0	Jun 1989	ITF Arezzo, Italy	25K	Clay	(Argentina) Gaby Castro	(United States) Anne Grousbeck (Japan) Ei Iida	w/o

== Other finals ==
=== Mediterranean games ===
==== Singles: 1 (1 gold medal) ====
Result	Year	Championship	Surface	Opponent	Score
Gold	1987	Latakia	Hard	(Syria) Angeliki Kanellopoulou	6–3, 5–7, 6–1

=== Spanish Championship ===
==== Singles: 1 (1-0) ====
Result	Year	Championship	Surface	Opponent	Score
Win	1988	Pamplona	Clay	(Spain) Arantxa Sánchez Vicario	6–0, 6–2

=== Spanish Masters ===
==== Singles: 2 (1-1) ====
Result	Year	Championship	Surface	Opponent	Score
Loss	1999	Murcia	Carpet	(Spain) Gala León	1–6, 6–4, 2–6
Win	2002	Barcelona	Carpet	(Spain) Marta Marrero	6–1, 6–1

== WTA Tour career earnings ==
Year	Grand Slam singles titles	WTA singles titles	Total singles titles	Earnings ($)	Money list rank
1988–89	0	4	4	231,988	[n/a]
1990	0	3	3	248,184	17
1991	0	3	3	304,790	15
1992	0	1	1	445,768	11
1993	0	5	5	1,208,795	3
1994	1	3	4	1,540,167	2
1995	0	6	6	1,266,558	3
1996	0	2	2	1,111,401	6
1997	0	0	0	528,544	13
1998	0	2	2	903,131	10
1999	0	1	1	486,392	17
2000	0	1	1	1,067,930	6
2001	0	0	0	444,517	25
2002	0	0	0	329,316	37
2003	0	0	0	496,178	20
2004	0	0	0	395,880	31
2005	0	1	1	518,438	24
Career	1	32	33	11,527,977	46

== Head-to-head vs. top 10 ranked players ==
vs. Steffi Graf 1-13

vs. Monica Seles 1-20

vs. Arantxa Sanchez-Vicario 4-14

vs. Martina Navratilova 4-1

vs. Martina Hingis 3-11

vs. Chris Evert 0-2

vs. Lindsay Davenport 8-9

vs. Jennifer Capriati 4-6

vs. Serena Williams 0-5

vs. Venus Williams 0-3

vs. Amélie Mauresmo 1-4

vs. Justine Henin 0-7

vs. Kim Clijsters 1-5

vs. Jelena Jankovic 0-1

vs. Dinara Safina 1-2

vs. Jana Novotna 1-4

vs. Mary Pierce 6-12

vs. Gabriela Sabatini 6-9

vs. Mary Joe Fernandez 4-4

vs. Zina Garrison 6-1

vs. Helena Sukova 4-2

vs. Anke Huber 2-7

vs. Iva Majoli 5-4

vs. Chanda Rubin 9-3

vs. Amanda Coetzer 15-3

vs. Elena Dementieva 3-2

vs. Anastasia Myskina 1-3

vs. Svetlana Kuznetsova 0-2

vs. Nadia Petrova 2-2

vs. Katerina Maleeva 7-1

vs. Magdalena Maleeva 11-1

vs. Manuela Maleeva 4-5

vs. Barbara Schett 4-2

vs. Daniela Hantuchova 3-3

vs. Kimiko Date 2-6

vs. Nathalie Tauziat 8-2

vs. Sandrine Testud 7-2

vs. Lori McNiel 3-3

vs. Julie Halard-Decugis 7-2

vs. Anna Kournikova 5-3

vs. Irina Spirlea 4-1

vs. Samantha Stosur 0-1

vs. Ai Sugiyama 5-1

vs. Natasha Zvereva 8-4

vs. Patty Schnyder 8-3

vs. Francesca Schiavone 2-1

vs. Roberta Vinci 1-0

vs. Jelena Dokic 6-5

vs. Paola Suárez 2-0

vs. Brenda Shultz-McCarthy 4-2

vs. Dominique Monami 3-1

vs. Alicia Molik 1-2

vs. Claudia Kohde-Kilsch 1-0

vs. Catarina Lindquist 2-0
