= Arantxa Sánchez Vicario career statistics =

Career finals
Discipline	Type	Won	Lost	Total
Singles	Grand Slam	4	8	12
Singles	Summer Olympics	0	1	1
Singles	WTA Finals (Note: Formerly known as: Virginia Slims Championships (until 1995); WTA Tour Championships (until 2014))	0	1	1
Singles	WTA 1000 (Note: Formerly known as: Category 4 & 5 & 6 (until 1990); Tier I (until 2009); WTA Premier Mandatory and 5 (until 2021))	6	10	16
Singles	WTA 500 (Note: Formerly known as: Category 3 (until 1990); Tier II (until 2009); WTA Premier (until 2021))	12	21	33
Singles	WTA 250 (Note: Formerly known as: Category 1 & 2 (until 1990); Tier III & IV & V (until 2009); WTA International (until 2021))	7	7	14
Singles	Virginia Slims	–	–	–
Singles	Total	29	48	77
Doubles	Grand Slam	6	5	11
Doubles	Summer Olympics	0	1	1
Doubles	WTA Finals	2	4	6
Doubles	WTA 1000	16	8	24
Doubles	WTA 500	31	14	45
Doubles	WTA 250	12	8	20
Doubles	Virginia Slims	2	2	4
Doubles	Total	69	42	111
Mixed doubles	Grand Slam	4	4	8
Mixed doubles	Total	4	4	8
Total		102	94	196

This is a list of the main career statistics of Spanish professional tennis player Arantxa Sánchez Vicario.

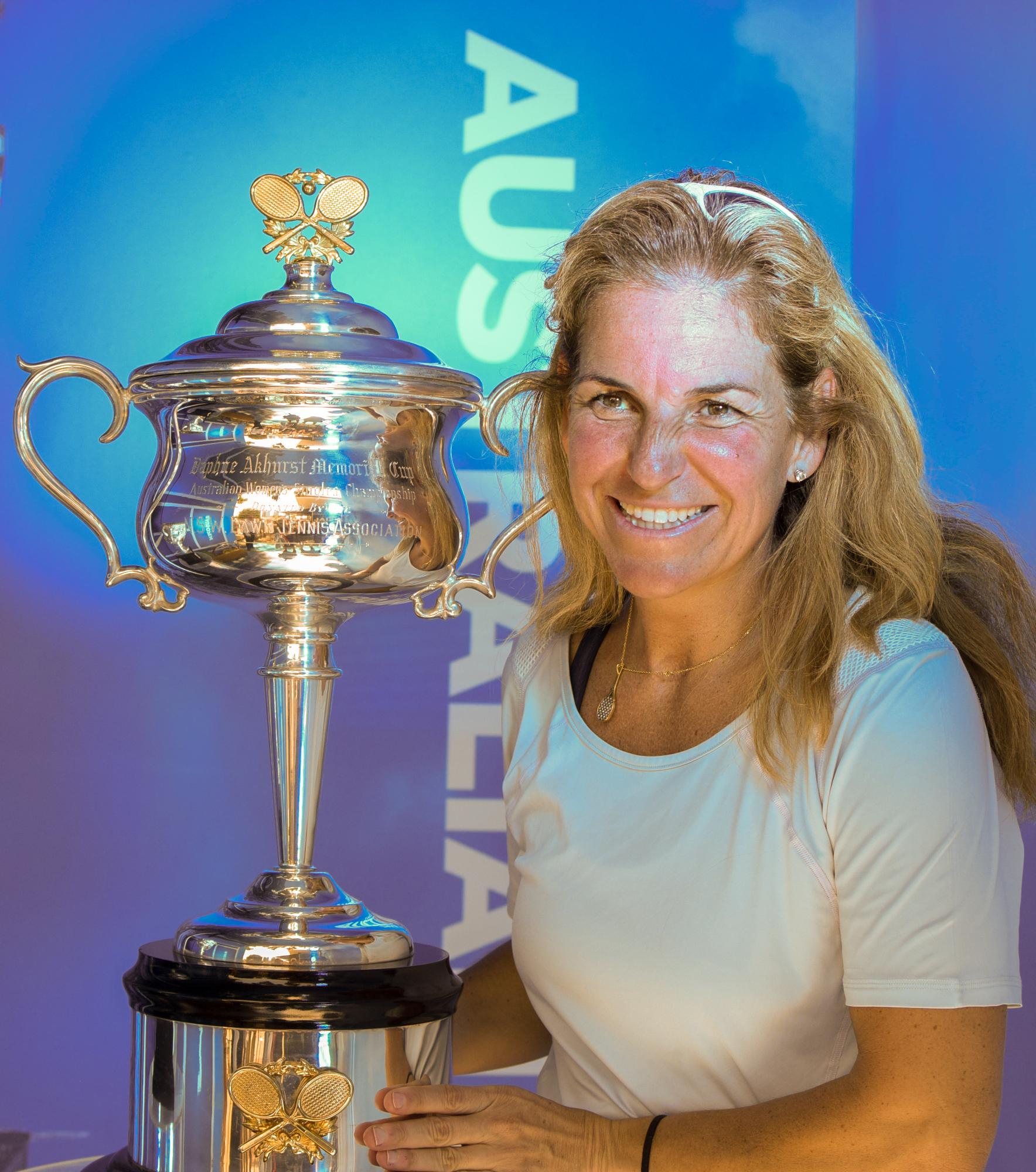
Sánchez Vicario holding the Australian Open trophy.

== Performance timelines ==
Key
W	F	SF	QF	#R	RR	Q#	P#	DNQ	A	Z#	PO	G	S	B	NMS	NTI	P	NH

(W) winner; (F) finalist; (SF) semifinalist; (QF) quarterfinalist; (#R) rounds 4, 3, 2, 1; (RR) round-robin stage; (Q#) qualification round; (P#) preliminary round; (DNQ) did not qualify; (A) absent; (Z#) Davis/Fed Cup Zonal Group (with number indication) or (PO) play-off; (G) gold, (S) silver or (B) bronze Olympic/Paralympic medal; (NMS) not a Masters tournament; (NTI) not a Tier I tournament; (P) postponed; (NH) not held; (SR) strike rate (events won / competed); (W–L) win–loss record.
To avoid confusion and double counting, these charts are updated at the conclusion of a tournament or when the player's participation has ended.

Only main-draw results in WTA Tour, Grand Slam tournaments, Billie Jean King Cup (Fed Cup), Hopman Cup and Olympic Games are included in win–loss records.

=== Singles ===
Tournament	1986	1987	1988	1989	1990	1991	1992	1993	1994	1995	1996	1997	1998	1999	2000	2001	2002	SR	W–L	Win%
Grand Slam tournaments
Australian Open	NH	A	A	A	A	SF	SF	SF	F	F	QF	3R	QF	2R	QF	A	1R	0 / 11	41–11	79%
French Open	Q1	QF	QF	W	2R	F	SF	SF	W	F	F	QF	W	SF	SF	2R	1R	3 / 16	72–13	85%
Wimbledon	A	1R	1R	QF	1R	QF	2R	4R	4R	F	F	SF	QF	2R	4R	2R	A	0 / 15	41–15	73%
US Open	A	1R	4R	QF	SF	QF	F	SF	W	4R	4R	QF	QF	4R	4R	3R	1R	1 / 16	56–15	79%
Win–loss	0–0	4–3	7–3	15–2	6–3	19–4	16–4	18–4	23–2	21–4	19–4	15–4	19–3	9–4	15–4	4–3	0–3	4 / 58	210–54	80%
Year-end championships
WTA Finals	DNQ			SF	QF	QF	QF	F	1R	1R	QF	QF	1R	1R	1R	QF	DNQ	0 / 13	11–13	46%
Grand Slam Cup	NH												QF	QF	NH			0 / 2	0–2	0%
National representation
Summer Olympics	NH		1R	NH			B	NH			S	NH			QF	NH		0 / 4	12–4	75%
Billie Jean King Cup	2R	2R	QF	F	SF	W	F	W	W	W	F	QF	W	A	F	RR	F	5 / 16	50–22	69%
WTA 1000 + former^{†} tournaments
Indian Wells Open	NH			A	NMS						A	SF	A	A	A	3R	QF	0 / 3	7–3	70%
Miami Open	NMS	1R	2R	3R	A	A	W	W	QF	3R	2R	4R	SF	2R	3R	4R	4R	2 / 14	30–12	71%
Italian Open	NH	NMS		F	3R	A	A	SF	A	F	QF	QF	SF	3R	QF	QF	A	0 / 10	24–10	71%
Canadian Open	NMS	A	A	F	A	A	W	SF	W	3R	F	3R	F	QF	SF	1R	1R	2 / 12	32–10	76%
Pan Pacific Open^{†}	NMS	A	A	A	NMS			A	A	A	F	A	A	A	A	A	A	0 / 1	2–1	67%
Charleston Open^{†}	NMS	1R	2R	SF	3R	SF	SF	F	QF	QF (Note: Withdraw during the tournament. Not counted as a loss.)	W	3R	2R	2R	F	2R	2R	1 / 16	29–14	67%
German Open^{†}	NMS	A	2R	A	A	F	F	A	2R	W	QF	3R	3R	SF	2R	QF	3R	1 / 12	25–11	69%
Zürich Open^{†}	NMS	A	NMS	A	NMS			A	A	A	A	1R	A	A	A	1R	A	0 / 2	0–2	0%
Kremlin Cup^{†}	NH										NMS	QF	A	A	2R	A	A	0 / 2	1–2	33%
Ameritech Cup^{†}	NMS	A	A	A	1R	NMS/NH												0 / 1	0–1	0%
Virginia Slims of Florida^{†}	NMS	A	A	3R	NMS	A	NMS/NH											0 / 1	1–1	50%
Amelia Island Championships^{†}	NMS	2R	3R	SF	NMS													0 / 3	6–3	67%
Virginia Slims of Houston^{†}	NMS	A	QF	A	NMS/NH													0 / 1	2–1	67%
Virginia Slims of Dallas^{†}	NMS	A	A	QF	NH													0 / 1	1–1	50%
Stuttgart Open^{†}	NMS	A	1R	A	NMS													0 / 1	0–1	0%
Brighton International^{†}	NMS	1R	A	A	NMS/NH													0 / 1	0–1	0%
Win–loss	0–0	2–4	7–6	18–7	2–3	7–2	18–2	16–3	10–3	13–3	14–5	11–8	12–5	6–5	10–6	7–7	8–5	6 / 81	160–74	68%
Career statistics
	1986	1987	1988	1989	1990	1991	1992	1993	1994	1995	1996	1997	1998	1999	2000	2001	2002	SR	W–L	Win%
Tournaments	10	13	17	15	16	16	18	18	17	15	19	23	20	19	19	24	24	Career total: 303		
Titles	0	0	1	2	2	1	2	4	8	2	2	0	2	1	0	2	0	Career total: 29		
Finals	1	0	2	4	7	5	8	9	12	7	9	1	5	1	2	3	1	Career total: 77		
Overall win–loss	16–11	13–14	33–16	51–14	44–15	62–15	67–18	77–14	74–9	49–15	57–22	47–24	51–20	24–20	45–21	36–23	28–27	29 / 303	774–298	72%
Year-end ranking	81	54	18	5	7	5	4	2	2	3	3	9	4	17	9	17	53	$16,942,639		

=== Doubles ===
Tournament	1986	1987	1988	1989	1990	1991	1992	1993	1994	1995	1996	1997	1998	1999	2000	2001	2002	2003	2004	2005	SR	W–L	Win%
Grand Slam tournaments
Australian Open	NH	A	A	A	A	3R	W	QF	SF	W	W	SF	QF	QF	1R	A	F	A	A	A	3 / 11	41–8	84%
French Open	A	3R	1R	QF	QF	SF	F	QF	A	F	SF	SF	SF	QF	1R	1R	1R	A	1R	1R	0 / 17	40–17	70%
Wimbledon	A	1R	1R	1R	QF	QF	SF	QF	F	W	QF	QF	QF	3R	3R	QF	A	A	1R	A	1 / 16	39–15	72%
US Open	A	2R	2R	1R	QF	3R	SF	W	W	QF	F	SF	3R	SF	3R	QF	1R	A	A	A	2 / 16	45–14	76%
Win–loss	0–0	3–3	1–3	3–3	9–3	11–4	19–3	15–3	15–2	19–2	18–3	15–4	12–4	12–4	4–4	5–3	4–3	0–0	0–2	0–1	6 / 60	165–54	75%
Year-end championships
WTA Finals	DNQ				F	SF	W	SF	F	W	F	QF	DNQ	F	DNQ		A	DNQ			2 / 9	16–7	70%
National representation
Summer Olympics	NH		A	NH			S	NH			B	NH			2R	NH			1R	NH	0 / 4	9–4	69%
WTA 1000 + former tournaments
Indian Wells Open	NH			A	NMS						A	SF	A	A	A	SF	SF	A	A	A	0 / 3	8–3	73%
Miami Open	NMS	2R	1R	2R	A	A	W	A	SF	W	W	W	F	QF	QF	W	1R	A	A	A	5 / 13	38–8	83%
Italian Open	NH	2R	NMS	2R	A	A	A	W	A	QF	W	A	F	2R	F	2R	A	A	1R	A	2 / 10	20–8	71%
Canadian Open	NMS	A	A	2R	A	A	QF	F	W	SF	W	QF	2R	F	1R	SF	QF	A	A	A	2 / 12	25–10	71%
Charleston Open^{†}	NMS	1R	2R	QF	W	SF	W	SF	W	A	W	A	2R	2R	QF	SF	SF	A	A	A	4 / 14	29–9	76%
German Open^{†}	NMS	A	2R	A	A	SF	SF	A	F	SF	A	SF	2R	SF	W	2R	F	A	QF	A	1 / 12	26–11	70%
Zürich Open^{†}	NMS	A	NMS	A	NMS			A	A	A	A	W	A	A	A	QF	A	A	A	A	1 / 2	5–1	83%
Kremlin Cup^{†}	NH										NMS	W	A	A	1R	A	A	A	A	A	1 / 2	4–1	80%
Ameritech Cup^{†}	NMS	A	A	A	F	NMS/NH															0 / 1	3–1	75%
Virginia Slims of Florida^{†}	NMS	A	A	1R	NMS	A	NMS/NH														0 / 1	0–1	0%
Amelia Island Championships^{†}	NMS	2R	1R	QF	NMS																0 / 3	3–3	50%
Eastbourne International^{†}	NMS	1R	A	1R	NMS																0 / 2	0–2	0%
Virginia Slims of Dallas^{†}	NMS	A	A	QF	NH																0 / 1	1–1	50%
Hamburg Open^{†}	NMS	QF	NMS																		0 / 1	1–1	50%
Stuttgart Open^{†}	NMS	A	1R	A	NMS																0 / 1	0–1	0%
Brighton International^{†}	NMS	QF	A	A	NMS/NH																0 / 1	1–1	50%
Win–loss	0–0	5–7	2–5	8–8	7–1	4–2	12–2	9–2	14–2	10–3	17–0	18–3	11–4	9–5	11–5	17–6	8–5	0–0	2–2	0–0	16 / 79	164–62	73%
Career statistics
	1986	1987	1988	1989	1990	1991	1992	1993	1994	1995	1996	1997	1998	1999	2000	2001	2002	2003	2004	2005	SR	W–L	Win%
Tournaments	8	13	14	15	15	16	20	17	18	12	16	21	18	17	18	23	23	0	8	1	Career total: 293		
Titles	1	0	0	0	4	3	10	5	11	6	9	7	0	3	2	1	6	0	1	0	Career total: 69		
Finals	1	0	1	2	7	4	14	7	16	8	12	7	5	6	4	2	13	0	2	0	Career total: 111		
Year-end ranking	91	83	89	48	8	7	3	6	3	1	1	5	12	9	16	11	7	–	112	–			

== Grand Slams tournament finals ==
=== Singles: 12 (4 titles, 8 runners-up) ===
Result	Year	Tournament	Surface	Opponent	Score
Win	1989	French Open	Clay	(West Germany) Steffi Graf	7–6^{(8–6)}, 3–6, 7–5
Loss	1991	French Open	Clay	(Socialist Federal Republic of Yugoslavia) Monica Seles	3–6, 4–6
Loss	1992	US Open	Hard	(Serbia and Montenegro) Monica Seles	3–6, 3–6
Loss	1994	Australian Open	Hard	(Germany) Steffi Graf	0–6, 2–6
Win	1994	French Open	Clay	(France) Mary Pierce	6–4, 6–4
Win	1994	US Open	Hard	(Germany) Steffi Graf	1–6, 7–6^{(7–3)}, 6–4
Loss	1995	Australian Open	Hard	(France) Mary Pierce	3–6, 2–6
Loss	1995	French Open	Clay	(Germany) Steffi Graf	5–7, 6–4, 0–6
Loss	1995	Wimbledon	Grass	(Germany) Steffi Graf	6–4, 1–6, 5–7
Loss	1996	French Open	Clay	(Germany) Steffi Graf	3–6, 7–6^{(7–4)}, 8–10
Loss	1996	Wimbledon	Grass	(Germany) Steffi Graf	3–6, 5–7
Win	1998	French Open	Clay	(United States) Monica Seles	7–6^{(7–5)}, 0–6, 6–2

=== Doubles: 11 (6 titles, 5 runners-up) ===
Result	Year	Tournament	Surface	Partner	Opponents	Score
Win	1992	Australian Open	Hard	(Czechoslovakia) Helena Suková	(United States) Mary Joe Fernandez (United States) Zina Garrison	6–4, 7–6^{(7–3)}
Loss	1992	French Open	Clay	(Spain) Conchita Martínez	(United States) Gigi Fernández (Belarus) Natasha Zvereva	3–6, 2–6
Win	1993	US Open	Hard	(Czech Republic) Helena Suková	(South Africa) Amanda Coetzer (Argentina) Inés Gorrochategui	6–4, 6–2
Loss	1994	Wimbledon	Grass	(Czech Republic) Jana Novotná	(United States) Gigi Fernández (Belarus) Natasha Zvereva	4–6, 1–6
Win	1994	US Open	Hard	(Czech Republic) Jana Novotná	(Bulgaria) Katerina Maleeva (United States) Robin White	6–3, 6–3
Win	1995	Australian Open	Hard	(Czech Republic) Jana Novotná	(United States) Gigi Fernández (Belarus) Natasha Zvereva	6–3, 6–7^{(3–7)}, 6–4
Loss	1995	French Open	Clay	(Czech Republic) Jana Novotná	(United States) Gigi Fernández (Belarus) Natasha Zvereva	7–6^{(8–6)}, 4–6, 5–7
Win	1995	Wimbledon	Grass	(Czech Republic) Jana Novotná	(United States) Gigi Fernández (Belarus) Natasha Zvereva	5–7, 7–5, 6–4
Win	1996	Australian Open	Hard	(United States) Chanda Rubin	(United States) Lindsay Davenport (United States) Mary Joe Fernandez	7–5, 2–6, 6–4
Loss	1996	US Open	Hard	(Czech Republic) Jana Novotná	(United States) Gigi Fernández (Belarus) Natasha Zvereva	6–1, 1–6, 4–6
Loss	2002	Australian Open	Hard	(Slovakia) Daniela Hantuchová	(Switzerland) Martina Hingis (Russia) Anna Kournikova	2–6, 7–6^{(7–4)}, 1–6

=== Mixed doubles: 8 (4 titles, 4 runners-up) ===
Result	Year	Tournament	Surface	Partner	Opponents	Score
Loss	1989	French Open	Clay	(Argentina) Horacio de la Peña	(Netherlands) Manon Bollegraf (Netherlands) Tom Nijssen	3–6, 7–6, 2–6
Win	1990	French Open	Clay	(Mexico) Jorge Lozano	(Australia) Nicole Provis (South Africa) Danie Visser	7–6, 7–6
Loss	1991	US Open	Hard	(Spain) Emilio Sánchez	(Netherlands) Manon Bollegraf (Netherlands) Tom Nijssen	2–6, 6–7
Loss	1992	Australian Open	Hard	(Australia) Todd Woodbridge	(Australia) Nicole Provis (Australia) Mark Woodforde	3–6, 6–4, 9–11
Win	1992	French Open	Clay	(Australia) Todd Woodbridge	(United States) Lori McNeil (United States) Bryan Shelton	6–2, 6–3
Win	1993	Australian Open	Hard	(Australia) Todd Woodbridge	(United States) Zina Garrison (United States) Rick Leach	7–5, 6–4
Loss	2000	Australian Open	Hard	(Australia) Todd Woodbridge	(Australia) Rennae Stubbs (United States) Jared Palmer	5–7, 6–7
Win	2000	US Open	Hard	(United States) Jared Palmer	(Russia) Anna Kournikova (Belarus) Max Mirnyi	6–4, 6–3

== Other significant finals ==
=== Summer Olympics ===
==== Singles: 2 medals (1 silver medal, 1 bronze medal) ====
Result	Year	Tournament	Surface	Opponent	Score
Bronze	1992	Barcelona Olympics	Clay	Tied	DNP
Silver	1996	Atlanta Olympics	Hard	(United States) Lindsay Davenport	6–7^{(8–10)}, 2–6

Note: Arantxa Sánchez Vicario lost in the semi-finals to Jennifer Capriati 3–6, 6–3, 1–6. In 1992, there was no bronze medal play-off match, both beaten semi-final players received bronze medals

==== Doubles: 2 medals (1 silver medal, 1 bronze medal) ====
Result	Year	Tournament	Surface	Partner	Opponents	Score
Silver	1992	Barcelona Olympics	Clay	(Spain) Conchita Martínez	(United States) Gigi Fernández (United States) Mary Joe Fernandez	5–7, 6–2, 2–6
Bronze	1996	Atlanta Olympics	Hard	(Spain) Conchita Martínez	(Netherlands) Manon Bollegraf (Netherlands) Brenda Schultz	6–3, 6–1

=== WTA Finals ===
==== Singles: 1 (1 runner–up) ====
Result	Year	Tournament	Surface	Opponent	Score
Loss	1993	Virginia Slims Championships, U.S.	Carpet	(Germany) Steffi Graf	1–6, 4–6, 6–3, 1–6

==== Doubles: 6 (2 titles, 4 runner–ups) ====
Result	Year	Tournament	Surface	Partner	Opponents	Score
Loss	1990	Virginia Slims Championships, U.S.	Carpet	(Argentina) Mercedes Paz	(United States) Kathy Jordan (Australia) Elizabeth Smylie	6–7^{(4–7)}, 4–6
Win	1992	Virginia Slims Championships, U.S.	Carpet	(Czechoslovakia) Helena Suková	(Latvia) Larisa Neiland (Czechoslovakia) Jana Novotná	7–6^{(7–4)}, 6–1
Loss	1994	Virginia Slims Championships, U.S.	Carpet	(Czech Republic) Jana Novotná	(United States) Gigi Fernández (Belarus) Natasha Zvereva	3–6, 7–6^{(7–4)}, 3–6
Win	1995	WTA Tour Championships, U.S.	Carpet	(Czech Republic) Jana Novotná	(United States) Gigi Fernández (Belarus) Natasha Zvereva	6–2, 6–1
Loss	1996	WTA Tour Championships, U.S.	Carpet	(Czech Republic) Jana Novotná	(United States) Lindsay Davenport (United States) Mary Joe Fernandez	3–6, 2–6
Loss	1999	WTA Tour Championships, U.S.	Carpet	(Latvia) Larisa Neiland	(Switzerland) Martina Hingis (Russia) Anna Kournikova	4–6, 4–6

== WTA Tour finals ==
=== Singles: 77 (29 titles, 48 runner–ups) ===
Legend Grand Slam (4–8) Year-end (Finals) (0–1) Olympics (0–1) WTA 1000 (Tier I) / (Category 5) (6–10) WTA 500 (Tier II) / (Category 3) (12–21) WTA 250 (Tier III / Tier IV) / (Category 1 / Category 2) (7–7)	Finals by surface Hard (8–22) Grass (1–4) Clay (19–18) Carpet (1–4)

Result	W–L	Date	Tournament	Tier	Surface	Opponent	Score
Loss	0–1	Dec 1986	Buenos Aires	Category 1	Clay	(Argentina) Gabriela Sabatini	1–6, 1–6
Loss	0–2	Mar 1988	Tampa	Category 3	Clay	(United States) Chris Evert	6–7^{(3–7)}, 4–6
Win	1–2	Jul 1988	Brussels	Category 1	Clay	(Italy) Raffaella Reggi	6–0, 7–5
Win	2–2	Apr 1989	Barcelona	Category 2	Clay	(Canada) Helen Kelesi	6–2, 5–7, 6–1
Loss	2–3	May 1989	Rome	Category 5	Clay	(Argentina) Gabriela Sabatini	2–6, 7–5, 4–6
Win	3–3	May 1989	French Open	Grand Slam	Clay	(Germany) Steffi Graf	7–6^{(8–6)}, 3–6, 7–5
Loss	3–4	Aug 1989	Toronto	Category 5	Hard	(United States) Martina Navratilova	2–6, 2–6
Loss	3–5	Jan 1990	Tokyo	Tier II	Carpet	(Germany) Steffi Graf	1–6, 2–6
Loss	3–6	Mar 1990	Houston	Tier III	Clay	(Bulgaria) Katerina Maleeva	1–6, 6–1, 4–6
Loss	3–7	Apr 1990	Amelia Island	Tier II	Clay	(Germany) Steffi Graf	1–6, 0–6
Win	4–7	Apr 1990	Barcelona	Tier IV	Clay	(West Germany) Isabel Cueto	6–4, 6–2
Loss	4–8	Apr 1990	Hamburg	Tier II	Clay	(Germany) Steffi Graf	7–5, 0–6, 1–6
Win	5–8	Jul 1990	Newport	Tier III	Grass	(United Kingdom) Jo Durie	7–6^{(7–2)}, 4–6, 7–5
Loss	5–9	Sep 1990	Leipzig	Tier III	Carpet	(Germany) Steffi Graf	1–6, 1–6
Loss	5–10	Jan 1991	Sydney	Tier III	Hard	(Czechoslovakia) Jana Novotná	4–6, 2–6
Loss	5–11	May 1991	Berlin	Tier I	Hard	(Germany) Steffi Graf	3–6, 6–4, 6–7^{(6–8)}
Loss	5–12	May 1991	French Open	Grand Slam	Clay	(Socialist Federal Republic of Yugoslavia) Monica Seles	3–6, 4–6
Loss	5–13	Jun 1991	Eastbourne	Tier II	Grass	(United States) Martina Navratilova	4–6, 4–6
Win	6–13	Aug 1991	Washington	Tier II	Hard	(Bulgaria) Katerina Maleeva	6–2, 7–5
Loss	6–14	Jan 1992	Sydney	Tier III	Hard	(Argentina) Gabriela Sabatini	1–6, 1–6
Win	7–14	Mar 1992	Key Biscayne	Tier I	Hard	(Argentina) Gabriela Sabatini	6–1, 6–4
Loss	7–15	Apr 1992	Barcelona	Tier III	Clay	(Socialist Federal Republic of Yugoslavia) Monica Seles	6–3, 2–6, 3–6
Loss	7–16	Apr 1992	Hamburg	Tier II	Clay	(Germany) Steffi Graf	6–7^{(5–7)}, 2–6
Loss	7–17	May 1992	Berlin	Tier I	Clay	(Germany) Steffi Graf	6–4, 5–7, 2–6
Win	8–17	Aug 1992	Montreal	Tier I	Hard	(Federal Republic of Yugoslavia) Monica Seles	6–3, 4–6, 6–4
Loss	8–18	Aug 1992	US Open	Grand Slam	Hard	(Federal Republic of Yugoslavia) Monica Seles	3–6, 3–6
Loss	8–19	Nov 1992	Philadelphia	Tier II	Carpet	(Germany) Steffi Graf	3–6, 6–3, 1–6
Loss	8–20	Mar 1993	Delray Beach	Tier II	Hard	(Germany) Steffi Graf	4–6, 3–6
Win	9–20	Mar 1993	Key Biscayne	Tier I	Hard	(Germany) Steffi Graf	6–4, 3–6, 6–3
Loss	9–21	Mar 1993	Hilton Head Island	Tier I	Clay	(Germany) Steffi Graf	6–7^{(8–10)}, 1–6
Win	10–21	Apr 1993	Amelia Island	Tier II	Clay	(Argentina) Gabriela Sabatini	6–2, 5–7, 6–2
Win	11–21	Apr 1993	Barcelona	Tier II	Clay	(Spain) Conchita Martínez	6–1, 6–4
Win	12–21	Apr 1993	Hamburg	Tier II	Clay	(Germany) Steffi Graf	6–3, 6–3
Loss	12–22	Aug 1993	San Diego	Tier II	Hard	(Germany) Steffi Graf	4–6, 6–4, 1–6
Loss	12–23	Aug 1993	Los Angeles	Tier II	Hard	(United States) Martina Navratilova	5–7, 6–7^{(4–7)}
Loss	12–24	Nov 1993	Virginia Slims Championships	Finals	Hard	(Germany) Steffi Graf	1–6, 4–6, 6–3, 1–6
Loss	12–25	Jan 1994	Australian Open	Grand Slam	Hard	(Germany) Steffi Graf	0–6, 2–6
Loss	12–26	Feb 1994	Delray Beach	Tier II	Hard	(Germany) Steffi Graf	3–6, 5–7
Win	13–26	Apr 1994	Amelia Island	Tier II	Clay	(Argentina) Gabriela Sabatini	6–1, 6–4
Win	14–26	Apr 1994	Barcelona	Tier II	Clay	(Croatia) Iva Majoli	6–0, 6–2
Win	15–26	Apr 1994	Hamburg	Tier II	Clay	(Germany) Steffi Graf	4–6, 7–6^{(7–3)}, 7–6^{(8–6)}
Win	16–26	May 1994	French Open	Grand Slam	Clay	(France) Mary Pierce	6–4, 6–4
Loss	16–27	Jul 1994	Stratton Mountain	Tier II	Hard	(Spain) Conchita Martínez	6–4, 3–6, 4–6
Loss	16–28	Aug 1994	San Diego	Tier II	Hard	(Germany) Steffi Graf	2–6, 1–6
Win	17–28	Aug 1994	Montreal	Tier I	Hard	(Germany) Steffi Graf	7–5, 1–6, 7–6^{(7–4)}
Win	18–28	Aug 1994	US Open	Grand Slam	Hard	(Germany) Steffi Graf	1–6, 7–6^{(7–3)}, 6–4
Win	19–28	Sep 1994	Tokyo	Tier II	Hard	(United States) Amy Frazier	6–1, 6–2
Win	20–28	Oct 1994	Oakland	Tier II	Carpet	(United States) Martina Navratilova	1–6, 7–6^{(7–5)}, 7–6^{(7–3)}
Loss	20–29	Jan 1995	Australian Open	Grand Slam	Hard	(France) Mary Pierce	3–6, 2–6
Win	21–29	Apr 1995	Barcelona	Tier II	Clay	(Croatia) Iva Majoli	5–7, 6–0, 6–2
Loss	21–30	May 1995	Rome	Tier I	Clay	(Spain) Conchita Martínez	3–6, 1–6
Win	22–30	May 1995	Berlin	Tier I	Clay	(Bulgaria) Magdalena Maleeva	6–4, 6–1
Loss	22–31	May 1995	French Open	Grand Slam	Clay	(Germany) Steffi Graf	5–7, 6–4, 0–6
Loss	22–32	Jue 1995	Wimbledon	Grand Slam	Grass	(Germany) Steffi Graf	6–4, 1–6, 5–7
Loss	22–33	Sep 1995	Tokyo	Tier II	Hard	(France) Mary Pierce	3–6, 3–6
Loss	22–34	Jan 1996	Tokyo	Tier I	Carpet	(Croatia) Iva Majoli	4–6, 1–6
Win	23–34	Apr 1996	Hilton Head Island	Tier I	Clay	(Austria) Barbara Paulus	6–2, 2–6, 6–2
Win	24–34	Apr 1996	Hamburg	Tier II	Clay	(Spain) Conchita Martínez	4–6, 7–6^{(7–4)}, 6–0
Loss	24–35	May 1996	French Open	Grand Slam	Clay	(Germany) Steffi Graf	3–6, 7–6^{(7–4)}, 8–10
Loss	24–36	Jun 1996	Wimbledon	Grand Slam	Grass	(Germany) Steffi Graf	3–6, 5–7
Loss	24–37	Jul 1996	Atlanta	Olympics	Hard	(United States) Lindsay Davenport	6–7^{(6–8)}, 2–6
Loss	24–38	Aug 1996	Montreal	Tier I	Hard	(United States) Monica Seles	1–6, 6–7^{(2–7)}
Loss	24–39	Aug 1996	San Diego	Tier II	Hard	(Japan) Kimiko Date	6–3, 3–6, 0–6
Loss	24–40	Sep 1996	Tokyo	Tier II	Hard	(United States) Monica Seles	1–6, 4–6
Loss	24–41	Sep 1997	Tokyo	Tier II	Hard	(United States) Monica Seles	1–6, 6–3, 6–7^{(5–7)}
Win	25–41	Jan 1998	Sydney	Tier II	Hard	(United States) Venus Williams	6–1, 6–3
Win	26–41	May 1998	French Open	Grand Slam	Clay	(United States) Monica Seles	7–6^{(7–5)}, 0–6, 6–2
Loss	26–42	Jun 1998	Eastbourne	Tier II	Grass	(Czech Republic) Jana Novotná	1–6, 5–7
Loss	26–43	Aug 1998	Montreal	Tier I	Hard	(United States) Monica Seles	3–6, 2–6
Loss	26–44	Sep 1998	Tokyo	Tier II	Hard	(United States) Monica Seles	6–4, 3–6, 4–6
Win	27–44	Apr 1999	Cairo	Tier III	Clay	(Romania) Irina Spîrlea	6–1, 6–0
Loss	27–45	Apr 2000	Hilton Head Island	Tier I	Clay	(France) Mary Pierce	1–6, 0–6
Loss	27–46	May 2000	Hamburg	Tier II	Clay	(Switzerland) Martina Hingis	3–6, 3–6
Win	28–46	Apr 2001	Porto	Tier IV	Clay	(Spain) Magüi Serna	6–3, 6–1
Win	29–46	May 2001	Madrid	Tier III	Clay	(Spain) Ángeles Montolio	7–5, 6–0
Loss	29–47	Sep 2001	Tokyo	Tier II	Clay	(Federal Republic of Yugoslavia) Jelena Dokić	4–6, 2–6
Loss	29–48	Jul 2002	Brussels	Tier IV	Clay	(Switzerland) Myriam Casanova	6–4, 2–6, 1–6

=== Doubles: 111 (69 titles, 42 runner–ups) ===
Legend Grand Slam tournaments (6–5) Finals (2–4) Olympic Games (0–1) WTA 1000 (Tier I) (16–8) WTA 500 (Tier II) (31–14) WTA 250 (Category 2 / Tier III / Tier IV / Tier V) (12–8) Uncategorized (2–2)	Finals by surface Hard (24–14) Grass (3–2) Clay (32–17) Carpet (10–9)

Result	W–L	Date	Tournament	Tier	Surface	Partner	Opponents	Score
Win	1–0	Sep 1986	Athens	Uncategorized	Clay	(West Germany) Isabel Cueto	(West Germany) Silke Meier (West Germany) Wiltrud Probst	4–6, 6–2, 6–4
Loss	1–1	Jul 1988	Aix-en-Provence	Category 2	Clay	(Italy) Sandra Cecchini	(France) Nathalie Herreman (France) Catherine Tanvier	4–6, 5–7
Loss	1–2	Apr 1989	Barcelona	Category 2	Clay	(Austria) Judith Wiesner	(Czechoslovakia) Jana Novotná (Denmark) Tine Scheuer-Larsen	2–6, 6–2, 6–7^{(3–7)}
Loss	1–3	Aug 1989	Albuquerque	Category 2	Hard	(Italy) Raffaella Reggi	(Australia) Nicole Provis (South Africa) Elna Reinach	6–4, 4–6, 2–6
Loss	1–4	Feb 1990	Chicago	Tier I	Carpet	(France) Nathalie Tauziat	(United States) Martina Navratilova (United States) Anne Smith	7–6^{(11–9)}, 4–6, 3–6
Win	2–4	Apr 1990	Hilton Head Island	Tier I	Clay	(United States) Martina Navratilova	(Argentina) Mercedes Paz (Soviet Union) Natasha Zvereva	6–2, 6–1
Win	3–4	Apr 1990	Amelia Island	Tier II	Clay	(Argentina) Mercedes Paz	(Czechoslovakia) Regina Rajchrtová (Hungary) Andrea Temesvári	7–6^{(7–5)}, 6–4
Win	4–4	Apr 1990	Tampa	Tier III	Clay	(Argentina) Mercedes Paz	(Italy) Sandra Cecchini (Peru) Laura Gildemeister	6–2, 6–0
Win	5–4	Apr 1990	Barcelona	Tier IV	Clay	(Argentina) Mercedes Paz	(Socialist Federal Republic of Yugoslavia) Sabrina Goleš (Argentina) Patricia Tarabini	6–7^{(7–9)}, 6–2, 6–1
Loss	5–5	Oct 1990	Filderstadt	Tier II	Carpet	(Argentina) Mercedes Paz	(United States) Mary Joe Fernández (United States) Zina Garrison	5–7, 3–6
Loss	5–6	Nov 1990	Virginia Slims Championships	Finals	Carpet	(Argentina) Mercedes Paz	(United States) Kathy Jordan (Australia) Elizabeth Smylie	6–7^{(4–7)}, 4–6
Win	6–6	Jan 1991	Sydney	Tier III	Hard	(Czechoslovakia) Helena Suková	(United States) Gigi Fernández (Czechoslovakia) Jana Novotná	6–1, 6–4
Win	7–6	Apr 1991	Amelia Island	Tier II	Clay	(Czechoslovakia) Helena Suková	(Argentina) Mercedes Paz (Soviet Union) Natasha Zvereva	4–6, 6–2, 6–2
Win	8–6	Apr 1991	Barcelona	Tier III	Clay	(United States) Martina Navratilova	(France) Nathalie Tauziat (Austria) Judith Wiesner	6–1, 6–3
Loss	8–7	Apr 1991	Hamburg	Tier II	Clay	(Czechoslovakia) Helena Suková	(Czechoslovakia) Jana Novotná (Soviet Union) Larisa Savchenko	5–7, 1–6
Win	9–7	Jan 1992	Sydney	Tier III	Hard	(Czechoslovakia) Helena Suková	(United States) Mary Joe Fernández (United States) Zina Garrison	7–6^{(7–4)}, 6–7^{(4–7)}, 6–2
Win	10–7	Jan 1992	Australian Open	Grand Slam	Hard	(Czechoslovakia) Helena Suková	(United States) Mary Joe Fernández (United States) Zina Garrison	6–4, 7–6^{(7–3)}
Win	11–7	Jan 1992	Tokyo	Tier II	Carpet	(Czechoslovakia) Helena Suková	(United States) Martina Navratilova (United States) Pam Shriver	7–5, 6–1
Win	12–7	Mar 1992	Key Biscayne	Tier I	Hard	(Latvia) Larisa Neiland	(Canada) Jill Hetherington (United States) Kathy Rinaldi	7–5, 5–7, 6–3
Loss	12–8	Mar 1992	Wesley Chapel	Uncategorized	Clay	(Belarus) Natasha Zvereva	(Latvia) Larisa Neiland (Czechoslovakia) Jana Novotná	4–6, 2–6
Win	13–8	Mar 1992	Hilton Head Island	Tier I	Clay	(Belarus) Natasha Zvereva	(Latvia) Larisa Neiland (Czechoslovakia) Jana Novotná	6–4, 6–2
Win	14–8	Apr 1992	Amelia Island	Tier II	Clay	(Belarus) Natasha Zvereva	(United States) Zina Garrison (Czechoslovakia) Jana Novotná	6–1, 6–0
Win	15–8	Apr 1992	Barcelona	Tier III	Clay	(Spain) Conchita Martínez	(France) Nathalie Tauziat (Austria) Judith Wiesner	6–4, 6–1
Loss	15–9	Apr 1992	Hamburg	Tier II	Clay	(Netherlands) Manon Bollegraf	(Germany) Steffi Graf (Australia) Rennae Stubbs	6–4, 3–6, 4–6
Loss	15–10	May 1992	French Open	Grand Slam	Clay	(Spain) Conchita Martínez	(United States) Gigi Fernández (Belarus) Natasha Zvereva	3–6, 2–6
Loss	15–11	Jul 1992	Barcelona	Olympics	Clay	(Spain) Conchita Martínez	(United States) Gigi Fernández (United States) Mary Joe Fernández	5–7, 6–2, 2–6
Win	16–11	Aug 1992	Los Angeles	Tier II	Hard	(Czechoslovakia) Helena Suková	(United States) Zina Garrison (United States) Pam Shriver	6–4, 6–2
Win	17–11	Oct 1992	Filderstadt	Tier II	Carpet	(Czechoslovakia) Helena Suková	(United States) Pam Shriver (Belarus) Natasha Zvereva	6–4, 7–5
Win	18–11	Nov 1992	Virginia Slims Championships	Finals	Carpet	(Czechoslovakia) Helena Suková	(Latvia) Larisa Neiland (Czechoslovakia) Jana Novotná	7–6^{(7–4)}, 6–1
Loss	18–12	Mar 1993	Wesley Chapel	Uncategorized	Clay	(Latvia) Larisa Neiland	(United States) Gigi Fernández (Belarus) Natasha Zvereva	5–7, 3–6
Win	19–12	Apr 1993	Barcelona	Tier II	Clay	(Spain) Conchita Martínez	(Bulgaria) Magdalena Maleeva (Switzerland) Manuela Maleeva-Fragniere	4–6, 6–1, 6–0
Win	20–12	May 1993	Rome	Tier I	Clay	(Czech Republic) Jana Novotná	(United States) Mary Joe Fernández (United States) Zina Garrison	6–4, 6–2
Win	21–12	Aug 1993	Los Angeles	Tier II	Hard	(Czech Republic) Helena Suková	(United States) Gigi Fernández (Belarus) Natasha Zvereva	7–6^{(7–3)}, 6–3
Loss	21–13	Aug 1993	Toronto	Tier I	Hard	(Czech Republic) Helena Suková	(Latvia) Larisa Neiland (Czech Republic) Jana Novotná	1–6, 2–6
Win	22–13	Aug 1993	US Open	Grand Slam	Hard	(Czech Republic) Helena Suková	(South Africa) Amanda Coetzer (Argentina) Inés Gorrochategui	6–4, 6–2
Win	23–13	Oct 1993	Essen	Tier II	Carpet	(Czech Republic) Helena Suková	(Germany) Wiltrud Probst (Germany) Christina Singer	6–2, 6–2
Loss	23–14	Jan 1994	Sydney	Tier II	Hard	(Czech Republic) Jana Novotná	(United States) Patty Fendick (United States) Meredith McGrath	2–6, 3–6
Win	24–14	Feb 1994	Delray Beach	Tier II	Hard	(Czech Republic) Jana Novotná	(Netherlands) Manon Bollegraf (Czech Republic) Helena Suková	6–2, 6–0
Win	25–14	Mar 1994	Wesley Chapel	Uncategorized	Clay	(Czech Republic) Jana Novotná	(United States) Gigi Fernández (Belarus) Natasha Zvereva	6–2, 7–5
Win	26–14	Mar 1994	Hilton Head Island	Tier I	Clay	(United States) Lori McNeil	(United States) Gigi Fernández (Belarus) Natasha Zvereva	6–4, 4–1 ret.
Win	27–14	Apr 1994	Amelia Island	Tier II	Clay	(Latvia) Larisa Neiland	(South Africa) Amanda Coetzer (Argentina) Inés Gorrochategui	6–2, 6–7^{(6–8)}, 6–4
Win	28–14	Apr 1994	Barcelona	Tier II	Clay	(Latvia) Larisa Neiland	(France) Julie Halard (France) Nathalie Tauziat	6–2, 6–4
Win	29–14	Apr 1994	Hamburg	Tier II	Clay	(Czech Republic) Jana Novotná	(Russia) Eugenia Maniokova (Georgia (country)) Leila Meskhi	6–3, 6–2
Loss	29–15	May 1994	Berlin	Tier I	Clay	(Czech Republic) Jana Novotná	(United States) Gigi Fernández (Belarus) Natasha Zvereva	3–6, 6–7^{(2–7)}
Loss	29–16	Jun 1994	Wimbledon	Grand Slam	Grass	(Czech Republic) Jana Novotná	(United States) Gigi Fernández (Belarus) Natasha Zvereva	4–6, 1–6
Loss	29–17	Jul 1994	Stratton Mountain	Tier II	Hard	(Spain) Conchita Martínez	(United States) Pam Shriver (Australia) Elizabeth Smylie	6–7^{(4–7)}, 6–2, 5–7
Win	30–17	Aug 1994	San Diego	Tier II	Hard	(Czech Republic) Jana Novotná	(United States) Ginger Helgeson (Australia) Rachel McQuillan	6–3, 6–3
Win	31–17	Aug 1994	Montreal	Tier I	Hard	(United States) Meredith McGrath	(United States) Pam Shriver (Australia) Elizabeth Smylie	2–6, 6–2, 6–4
Win	32–17	Aug 1994	US Open	Grand Slam	Hard	(Czech Republic) Jana Novotná	(Bulgaria) Katerina Maleeva (United States) Robin White	6–3, 6–3
Win	33–17	Sep 1994	Tokyo	Tier II	Hard	(France) Julie Halard	(United States) Amy Frazier (Japan) Rika Hiraki	6–1, 0–6, 6–1
Win	34–17	Oct 1994	Oakland	Tier II	Carpet	(United States) Lindsay Davenport	(United States) Gigi Fernández (United States) Martina Navratilova	7–5, 6–4
Loss	34–18	Nov 1994	Virginia Slims Championships	Finals	Carpet	(Czech Republic) Jana Novotná	(United States) Gigi Fernández (Belarus) Natasha Zvereva	3–6, 7–6^{(7–4)}, 3–6
Win	35–18	Jan 1995	Australian Open	Grand Slam	Hard	(Czech Republic) Jana Novotná	(United States) Gigi Fernández (Belarus) Natasha Zvereva	6–3, 6–7^{(3–7)}, 6–4
Loss	35–19	Feb 1995	Indian Wells	Tier I	Hard	(Latvia) Larisa Neiland	(United States) Lindsay Davenport (United States) Lisa Raymond	6–2, 4–6, 3–6
Win	36–19	Mar 1995	Key Biscayne	Tier I	Hard	(Czech Republic) Jana Novotná	(United States) Gigi Fernández (Belarus) Natasha Zvereva	7–5, 2–6, 6–3
Win	37–19	Apr 1995	Barcelona	Tier II	Clay	(Latvia) Larisa Neiland	(South Africa) Mariaan de Swardt (Croatia) Iva Majoli	7–5, 4–6, 7–5
Loss	37–20	May 1995	French Open	Grand Slam	Clay	(Czech Republic) Jana Novotná	(United States) Gigi Fernández (Belarus) Natasha Zvereva	7–6^{(8–6)}, 4–6, 5–7
Win	38–20	Jun 1995	Eastbourne	Tier II	Grass	(Czech Republic) Jana Novotná	(United States) Gigi Fernández (Belarus) Natasha Zvereva	0–6, 6–3, 6–4
Win	39–20	Jun 1995	Wimbledon	Grand Slam	Grass	(Czech Republic) Jana Novotná	(United States) Gigi Fernández (Belarus) Natasha Zvereva	5–7, 7–5, 6–4
Win	40–20	Nov 1995	WTA Tour Championships	Finals	Carpet	(Czech Republic) Jana Novotná	(United States) Gigi Fernández (Belarus) Natasha Zvereva	6–2, 6–1
Win	41–20	Jan 1996	Australian Open	Grand Slam	Hard	(United States) Chanda Rubin	(United States) Lindsay Davenport (United States) Mary Joe Fernández	7–5, 2–6, 6–4
Win	42–20	Mar 1996	Key Biscayne	Tier I	Hard	(Czech Republic) Jana Novotná	(United States) Meredith McGrath (Latvia) Larisa Neiland	6–4, 6–4
Win	43–20	Apr 1996	Hilton Head Island	Tier I	Clay	(Czech Republic) Jana Novotná	(United States) Gigi Fernández (United States) Mary Joe Fernández	6–2, 6–3
Win	44–20	Apr 1996	Amelia Island	Tier II	Clay	(United States) Chanda Rubin	(United States) Meredith McGrath (Latvia) Larisa Neiland	6–1, 6–1
Win	45–20	Apr 1996	Hamburg	Tier II	Clay	(Netherlands) Brenda Schultz-McCarthy	(United States) Gigi Fernández (Switzerland) Martina Hingis	4–6, 7–6^{(12–10)}, 6–4
Win	46–20	May 1996	Rome	Tier I	Clay	(Romania) Irina Spîrlea	(United States) Gigi Fernández (Switzerland) Martina Hingis	6–4, 3–6, 6–3
Win	47–20	May 1996	Madrid	Tier II	Clay	(Czech Republic) Jana Novotná	(Belgium) Sabine Appelmans (Netherlands) Miriam Oremans	7–6^{(7–4)}, 6–2
Win	48–20	Jun 1996	Eastbourne	Tier II	Grass	(Czech Republic) Jana Novotná	(South Africa) Rosalyn Fairbank-Nideffer (United States) Pam Shriver	4–6, 7–5, 6–3
Win	49–20	Aug 1996	Montreal	Tier I	Hard	(Latvia) Larisa Neiland	(United States) Mary Joe Fernández (Czech Republic) Helena Suková	7–6^{(7–1)}, 6–1
Loss	49–21	Aug 1996	San Diego	Tier II	Hard	(Latvia) Larisa Neiland	(United States) Gigi Fernández (Spain) Conchita Martínez	6–4, 3–6, 4–6
Loss	49–22	Aug 1996	US Open	Grand Slam	Hard	(Czech Republic) Jana Novotná	(United States) Gigi Fernández (Belarus) Natasha Zvereva	6–1, 1–6, 4–6
Loss	49–23	Nov 1996	Chase Championships	Finals	Carpet	(Czech Republic) Jana Novotná	(United States) Gigi Fernández (Belarus) Natasha Zvereva	3–6, 2–6
Win	50–23	Jan 1997	Sydney	Tier II	Hard	(United States) Gigi Fernández	(United States) Lindsay Davenport (Belarus) Natasha Zvereva	6–3, 6–1
Win	51–23	Mar 1997	Key Biscayne	Tier I	Hard	(Belarus) Natasha Zvereva	(Belgium) Sabine Appelmans (Netherlands) Miriam Oremans	6–2, 6–3
Win	52–23	May 1997	Madrid	Tier III	Clay	(United States) Mary Joe Fernández	(Argentina) Inés Gorrochategui (Romania) Irina Spîrlea	6–3, 6–2
Win	53–23	Jul 1997	San Diego	Tier II	Clay	(Switzerland) Martina Hingis	(United States) Amy Frazier (United States) Kimberly Po	6–3, 7–5
Win	54–23	Oct 1997	Filderstadt	Tier II	Carpet	(Switzerland) Martina Hingis	(United States) Lindsay Davenport (Czech Republic) Jana Novotná	7–6^{(7–4)}, 3–6, 7–6^{(7–3)}
Win	55–23	Oct 1997	Zürich	Tier I	Carpet	(Switzerland) Martina Hingis	(Latvia) Larisa Neiland (Czech Republic) Helena Suková	4–6, 6–4, 6–1
Win	56–23	Oct 1997	Moscow	Tier I	Carpet	(Belarus) Natasha Zvereva	(Indonesia) Yayuk Basuki (Netherlands) Caroline Vis	5–3 ret.
Loss	56–24	Mar 1998	Key Biscayne	Tier I	Hard	(Belarus) Natasha Zvereva	(Switzerland) Martina Hingis (Czech Republic) Jana Novotná	2–6, 6–3, 3–6
Loss	56–25	May 1998	Rome	Tier I	Clay	(South Africa) Amanda Coetzer	(Spain) Virginia Ruano Pascual (Argentina) Paola Suárez	6–7^{(1–7)}, 4–6
Loss	56–26	Jun 1998	Eastbourne	Tier II	Grass	(Belarus) Natasha Zvereva	(South Africa) Mariaan de Swardt (Czech Republic) Jana Novotná	1–6, 3–6
Loss	56–27	Sep 1998	Tokyo	Tier II	Hard	(United States) Mary Joe Fernández	(Russia) Anna Kournikova (United States) Monica Seles	4–6, 4–6
Loss	56–28	Oct 1998	Filderstadt	Tier II	Carpet	(Russia) Anna Kournikova	(United States) Lindsay Davenport (Belarus) Natasha Zvereva	4–6, 2–6
Win	57–28	Apr 1999	Cairo	Tier III	Clay	(Belgium) Laurence Courtois	(Romania) Irina Spîrlea (Netherlands) Caroline Vis	5–7, 6–1, 7–6^{(7–3)}
Win	58–28	Apr 1999	Hamburg	Tier II	Clay	(Latvia) Larisa Neiland	(South Africa) Amanda Coetzer (Czech Republic) Jana Novotná	6–2, 6–1
Win	59–28	Aug 1999	Los Angeles	Tier II	Hard	(Latvia) Larisa Neiland	(United States) Lisa Raymond (Australia) Rennae Stubbs	6–2, 6–7^{(5–7)}, 6–0
Loss	59–29	Aug 1999	Toronto	Tier I	Hard	(Latvia) Larisa Neiland	(Czech Republic) Jana Novotná (France) Mary Pierce	3–6, 6–2, 3–6
Loss	59–30	Oct 1999	Filderstadt	Tier II	Carpet	(Latvia) Larisa Neiland	(United States) Chanda Rubin (France) Sandrine Testud	3–6, 4–6
Loss	59–31	Nov 1999	Chase Championships	Finals	Carpet	(Latvia) Larisa Neiland	(Switzerland) Martina Hingis (Russia) Anna Kournikova	4–6, 4–6
Win	60–31	May 2000	Berlin	Tier I	Clay	(Spain) Conchita Martínez	(South Africa) Amanda Coetzer (United States) Corina Morariu	3–6, 6–2, 7–6^{(9–7)}
Loss	60–32	May 2000	Rome	Tier I	Clay	(Spain) Magüi Serna	(United States) Lisa Raymond (Australia) Rennae Stubbs	3–6, 6–4, 2–6
Loss	60–33	Oct 2000	Filderstadt	Tier II	Carpet	(Austria) Barbara Schett	(Switzerland) Martina Hingis (Russia) Anna Kournikova	4–6, 2–6
Win	61–33	Oct 2000	Leipzig	Tier II	Carpet	(France) Anne-Gaëlle Sidot	(Belgium) Kim Clijsters (Belgium) Laurence Courtois	6–7^{(6–8)}, 7–5, 6–3
Win	62–33	Mar 2001	Key Biscayne	Tier I	Hard	(France) Nathalie Tauziat	(United States) Lisa Raymond (Australia) Rennae Stubbs	6–0, 6–4
Loss	62–34	Apr 2001	Amelia Island	Tier II	Clay	(United States) Martina Navratilova	(Spain) Conchita Martínez (Argentina) Patricia Tarabini	4–6, 2–6
Loss	62–35	Jan 2002	Australian Open	Grand Slam	Hard	(Slovakia) Daniela Hantuchová	(Switzerland) Martina Hingis (Russia) Anna Kournikova	2–6, 7–6^{(7–4)}, 1–6
Win	63–35	Feb 2002	Doha	Tier III	Hard	(Slovakia) Janette Husárová	(France) Alexandra Fusai (Netherlands) Caroline Vis	6–3, 6–3
Win	64–35	Apr 2002	Amelia Island	Tier II	Clay	(Slovakia) Daniela Hantuchová	(Argentina) María Emilia Salerni (Sweden) Åsa Svensson	6–4, 6–2
Loss	64–36	Apr 2002	Hamburg	Tier II	Clay	(Slovakia) Daniela Hantuchová	(Switzerland) Martina Hingis (Austria) Barbara Schett	1–6, 1–6
Loss	64–37	May 2002	Berlin	Tier I	Clay	(Slovakia) Daniela Hantuchová	(Russia) Elena Dementieva (Slovakia) Janette Husárová	6–0, 6–7^{(3–7)}, 2–6
Loss	64–38	May 2002	Madrid	Tier III	Clay	(Paraguay) Rossana de los Ríos	(United States) Martina Navratilova (Belarus) Natasha Zvereva	2–6, 3–6
Loss	64–39	Jul 2002	Brussels	Tier IV	Clay	(Italy) Tathiana Garbin	(Austria) Barbara Schwartz (Germany) Jasmin Wöhr	2–6, 6–0, 4–6
Win	65–39	Jul 2002	Sopot	Tier III	Clay	(Russia) Svetlana Kuznetsova	(Russia) Evgenia Kulikovskaya (Russia) Ekaterina Sysoeva	6–2, 6–2
Win	66–39	Aug 2002	Helsinki	Tier IV	Clay	(Russia) Svetlana Kuznetsova	(Spain) Eva Bes (Spain) María José Martínez Sánchez	6–3, 6–7^{(5–7)}, 6–3
Win	67–39	Aug 2002	New Haven	Tier II	Hard	(Slovakia) Daniela Hantuchová	(Italy) Tathiana Garbin (Slovakia) Janette Husárová	6–3, 1–6, 7–5
Win	68–39	Sep 2002	Tokyo	Tier II	Hard	(Russia) Svetlana Kuznetsova	(Hungary) Petra Mandula (Austria) Patricia Wartusch	6–2, 6–4
Loss	68–40	Sep 2002	Bali	Tier III	Hard	(Russia) Svetlana Kuznetsova	(Zimbabwe) Cara Black (Spain) Virginia Ruano Pascual	2–6, 3–6
Loss	68–41	Sep 2002	Tokyo	Tier III	Hard	(Russia) Svetlana Kuznetsova	(Japan) Shinobu Asagoe (Japan) Nana Miyagi	4–6, 6–4, 4–6
Win	69–41	Jul 2004	Palermo	Tier V	Clay	(Spain) Anabel Medina Garrigues	(Slovakia) Ľubomíra Kurhajcová (Slovakia) Henrieta Nagyová	6–3, 7–6^{(7–4)}
Loss	69–42	Sep 2004	Bali	Tier III	Hard	(Russia) Svetlana Kuznetsova	(Russia) Anastasia Myskina (Japan) Ai Sugiyama	3–6, 5–7

== WTA Tour career earnings ==
Year	Grand Slam titles (Note: Includes singles, doubles and mixed doubles titles.)	WTA titles	Total titles	Earnings ($)	Money list rank
1990	0	2	2	517,662	9
1991	0	1	1	799,340	5
1992	0	2	2	1,376,355	3
1993	0	4	4	1,938,239	2
1994	2	6	8	2,943,665	1
1995	0	2	2	1,456,516	2
1996	0	2	2	1,858,444	2
1997	0	0	0	890,512	6
1998	1	1	2	1,468,608	5
1999	0	1	1	807,921	9
2000	0	0	0	819,689	10
2001	0	2	2	725,342	13
2002	0	0	0	441,378	24
Career	4	25	29	16,942,640	8

== Top 10 wins ==
- She has a 84–132 (39%) record against players who were, at the time the match was played, ranked in the top 10.

Result	W–L	Player	vsRank	Event	Surface	Round	Score	Rank	H2H
1988
1.		(United States)	4						
2.		(Belarus) Natasha Zvereva	7						
1989
3.		(Germany) Steffi Graf	1						
4.		(Argentina) Gabriela Sabatini	3						
5.		(Switzerland)	9						
1990
6.		(United States)	6						
7.		(Argentina) Gabriela Sabatini	3						
8.		(United States)	2						
9.		(United States)	4						
1991
10.		(United States)	10						
11.		(Argentina) Gabriela Sabatini	5						
12.		(United States)	5						
13.		(Germany) Steffi Graf	2						
14.		(United States)	6						
1992
15.		(Spain)	9						
16.		(United States)	6						
17.		(Argentina) Gabriela Sabatini	3						
18.		(Spain)	7						
19.		(Czech Republic)	10						
20.		(Argentina) Gabriela Sabatini	4						
21.		(United States)	7						
22.		(Spain)	8						
23.		(United States)	1						
24.		(Germany) Steffi Graf	2						
25.		(Switzerland)	10						
26.		(Argentina) Gabriela Sabatini	3						
1993
27.		(United States)	6						
28.		(Germany) Steffi Graf	2						
29.		(United States)	8						
30.		(Argentina) Gabriela Sabatini	5						
31.		(Spain)	8						
32.		(Germany) Steffi Graf	2						
33.		(United States)	7						
34.		(Czech Republic)	9						
35.		(Germany)	10						
36.		(Czech Republic)	7						
1994
37.		(Argentina) Gabriela Sabatini	6						
38.		(United States)	4						
39.		(Argentina) Gabriela Sabatini	6						
40.		(Germany) Steffi Graf	1						
41.		(Germany)	10						
42.		(Spain)	3						
43.		(Japan)	5						
44.		(United States)	6						
45.		(Spain)	3						
46.		(Japan)	6						
47.		(Germany) Steffi Graf	1						
48.		(Japan)	6						
49.		(Argentina) Gabriela Sabatini	10						
50.		(Germany) Steffi Graf	1						
51.		(United States)	7						
52.		(United States)	5						
1995
53.		(Japan)	8						
54.		(Bulgaria)	9						
55.		(Japan)	9						
56.		(Germany)	10						
57.		(Spain)	3						
58.		(Germany)	10						
59.		(Argentina) Gabriela Sabatini	7						
60.		(United States)	8						
1996
61.		(United States)	10						
62.		(Bulgaria)	4						
63.		(Spain)	2						
64.		(Spain)	2						
65.		(Czech Republic)	8						
66.		(Japan)	9						
67.		(Czech Republic)	6						
68.		(Czech Republic)	6						
1997
69.		(France)	9						
70.		(United States)	5						
71.		(South Africa)	4						
72.		(United States)	5						
1998
73.		(Czech Republic)	3						
74.		(United States)	2						
75.		(United States)	8						
76.		(France)	8						
77.		(Spain)	7						
78.		(Czech Republic)	3						
79.		(Switzerland)	9						
2000
80.		(France)	9						
81.		(Austria)	9						
82.		(Spain)	8						
83.		(United States)	4						
2001
84.		(Switzerland) Martina Hingis	1						
