= 1996 Family Circle Cup =

- Date: April 1–7
- Edition: 24th
- Category: Tier I
- Draw: 28S / 16D
- Prize money: $926,250
- Surface: Clay / outdoor
- Location: Hilton Head Island, U.S.
- Venue: Sea Pines Plantation

Champions

Singles
- (Spain) Arantxa Sánchez Vicario

Doubles
- (Czech Republic) Jana Novotná (Spain) Arantxa Sánchez Vicario
← 1995 ·	Family Circle Cup	· 1997 →

The 1996 Family Circle Cup was a women's tennis tournament played on outdoor clay courts at the Sea Pines Plantation on Hilton Head Island, South Carolina in the United States that was part of the Tier I category of the 1996 WTA Tour. It was the 24th edition of the tournament and was held from April 1 through April 7, 1996. Second-seeded Arantxa Sánchez Vicario won the singles title.

== Finals ==
=== Singles ===
(Spain) Arantxa Sánchez Vicario defeated (Austria) Barbara Paulus 6–2, 2–6, 6–2

- It was Sánchez Vicario's 1st singles title of the year and the 23rd of her career.

=== Doubles ===
(Czech Republic) Jana Novotná / (Spain) Arantxa Sánchez Vicario defeated (United States) Gigi Fernández / (United States) Mary Joe Fernández 6–2, 6–3

- It was Novotná's 3rd doubles title of the year and the 58th of her career. It was Sánchez Vicario's 3rd doubles title of the year and the 43rd of her career.
