= 1994 Family Circle Cup =

- Date: March 28 – April 3
- Edition: 22nd
- Category: Tier I
- Draw: 56S / 28D
- Prize money: $750,000
- Surface: Clay / outdoor
- Location: Hilton Head Island, South Carolina, U.S.
- Venue: Sea Pines Plantation

Champions

Singles
- (Spain) Conchita Martínez

Doubles
- (United States) Lori McNeil (Spain) Arantxa Sánchez Vicario
← 1993 ·	Family Circle Cup	· 1995 →

The 1994 Family Circle Cup was a women's tennis tournament played on outdoor clay courts at the Sea Pines Plantation on Hilton Head Island, South Carolina in the United States that was part of Tier I of the 1994 WTA Tour. It was the 22nd edition of the tournament and was held from March 28 through April 3, 1994. Second-seeded Conchita Martínez won the singles title.

== Finals ==
=== Singles ===
(Spain) Conchita Martínez defeated (Belarus) Natasha Zvereva 6–4, 6–0

- It was Martínez's 1st title of the year and the 21st of her career.

=== Doubles ===
(United States) Lori McNeil / (Spain) Arantxa Sánchez Vicario defeated (United States) Gigi Fernández / (Belarus) Natasha Zvereva 6–4, 4–1 (Fernández and Zvereva retired)

- It was McNeil's 1st title of the year and the 36th of her career. It was Sánchez Vicario's 3rd title of the year and the 41st of her career.
