= 1995 Family Circle Cup =

- Date: March 27 – April 2
- Edition: 23rd
- Category: Tier I
- Surface: Clay / outdoor
- Location: Hilton Head Island, SC, U.S.
- Venue: Sea Pines Plantation

Champions

Singles
- (Spain) Conchita Martínez

Doubles
- (United States) Nicole Arendt / (Netherlands) Manon Bollegraf
← 1994 ·	Family Circle Cup	· 1996 →

The 1995 Family Circle Cup was a women's tennis tournament played on outdoor clay courts at the Sea Pines Plantation on Hilton Head Island, South Carolina in the United States that was part of Tier I of the 1995 WTA Tour. The tournament was held from March 27 through April 2, 1995. Conchita Martínez won the singles title.

== Finals ==
=== Singles ===
(Spain) Conchita Martínez defeated (Bulgaria) Magdalena Maleeva 6–1, 6–1

- It was Martínez's 1st title of the year and the 25th of her career.

=== Doubles ===
(United States) Nicole Arendt / (Netherlands) Manon Bollegraf defeated (United States) Gigi Fernández / (Belarus) Natasha Zvereva 0–6, 6–3, 6–4

- It was Arendt's 2nd title of the year and the 4th of her career. It was Bollegraf's 1st title of the year and the 17th of her career.
