= 1994 Family Circle Cup – Doubles =

Doubles
- 1994 Family Circle Cup

Final
- Champions: (United States) Lori McNeil; (Spain) Arantxa Sánchez Vicario
- Runners-up: (United States) Gigi Fernández; (Belarus) Natasha Zvereva
- Score: 6–4, 4–1 (ret.)

Details
- Draw: 28
- Seeds: 8

Events
Singles	Doubles
← 1993 ·	Family Circle Cup	· 1995 →

Gigi Fernández and Natasha Zvereva were the defending champions but lost in the final after they were forced to retire at 6–4, 4–1 against Lori McNeil and Arantxa Sánchez Vicario.

== Seeds ==
Champion seeds are indicated in bold text while text in italics indicates the round in which those seeds were eliminated. The top four seeded teams received byes into the second round.

1. (United States) Gigi Fernández / (Belarus) Natasha Zvereva (final)
2. (United States) **Lori McNeil** / (Spain) **Arantxa Sánchez Vicario (champions)**
3. (Netherlands) Manon Bollegraf / (United States) Martina Navratilova (semifinals)
4. (Australia) Elizabeth Smylie / (Australia) Rennae Stubbs (second round)
5. (Spain) Conchita Martínez / (Latvia) Larisa Neiland (first round)
6. (South Africa) Amanda Coetzer / (Argentina) Inés Gorrochategui (quarterfinals)
7. (Italy) Sandra Cecchini / (Argentina) Patricia Tarabini (first round)
8. (United States) Lindsay Davenport / (United States) Lisa Raymond (semifinals)

== Draw ==
=== Key ===
- Q = Qualifier
- WC = Wild card
- LL = Lucky loser
- Alt = Alternate
- SE = Special exempt
- PR = Protected ranking
- ITF = ITF entry
- JE = Junior exempt
- w/o = Walkover
- r = Retired
- d = Defaulted
- SR = Special ranking

=== Final ===
Final

1
- (United States) Gigi Fernández
- (Belarus) Natasha Zvereva
4
1^{r}

2
- (United States) **Lori McNeil**
- (Spain) **Arantxa Sánchez Vicario**
**6**
4

=== Top half ===
First round

Second round

Quarterfinals

Semifinals

1
- (United States) **G Fernández**
- (Belarus) **N Zvereva**
**6**
**6**

- (Netherlands) K Boogert
- (Belgium) L Courtois
3
4

- (Germany) M Babel
- (Sweden) Å Carlsson
1
3

- (Germany) **M Babel**
- (Sweden) **Å Carlsson**
**6**
**6**

1
- (United States) **G Fernández**
- (Belarus) **N Zvereva**
**6**
**6**

- (United States) **K Adams**
- (Argentina) **M Paz**
**6**
5
**6**

- (United States) K Adams
- (Argentina) M Paz
1
4

- (United States) A Grossman
- (United States) S McCarthy
0
**7**
2

- (United States) **K Adams**
- (Argentina) **M Paz**
3
**6**
**6**

Q
- (Slovakia) **D Szabova**
- (France) **N van Lottum**
3
**7**
**6**

Q
- (Slovakia) D Szabova
- (France) N van Lottum
**6**
4
1

7
- (Italy) S Cecchini
- (Argentina) P Tarabini
**6**
5
3

1
- (United States) **G Fernández**
- (Belarus) **N Zvereva**
**6**
3
**6**

3
- (Netherlands) M Bollegraf
- (United States) M Navratilova
0
**6**
2

3
- (Netherlands) **M Bollegraf**
- (United States) **M Navratilova**
**7**
**7**

- (Canada) **J Hetherington**
- (United States) **S Stafford**
4
**6**
**7**

- (Canada) J Hetherington
- (United States) S Stafford
5
6

- (United States) C MacGregor
- (United States) S Reece
**6**
3
5

3
- (Netherlands) **M Bollegraf**
- (United States) **M Navratilova**
**6**
**7**

- (Croatia) **I Majoli**
- (Germany) **B Rittner**
**6**
**6**

6
- (South Africa) A Coetzer
- (Argentina) I Gorrochategui
2
5

- (United Kingdom) J Durie
- (Germany) K Kschwendt
4
1

- (Croatia) I Majoli
- (Germany) B Rittner
**6**
6
1

- (Romania) R Dragomir
- (Romania) I Spîrlea
5
3

6
- (South Africa) **A Coetzer**
- (Argentina) **I Gorrochategui**
4
**7**
**6**

6
- (South Africa) **A Coetzer**
- (Argentina) **I Gorrochategui**
**7**
**6**

=== Bottom half ===
First round

Second round

Quarterfinals

Semifinals

8
- (United States) **L Davenport**
- (United States) **L Raymond**
**6**
**6**

- (Czech Republic) P Langrová
- (Russia) E Makarova
3
3

8
- (United States) **L Davenport**
- (United States) **L Raymond**
**6**
5
**6**

- (Czech Republic) R Bobková
- (Slovakia) J Husárová
6
3

- (Russia) E Maniokova
- (Georgia (country)) L Meskhi
2
**7**
1

- (Russia) **E Maniokova**
- (Georgia (country)) **L Meskhi**
**7**
**6**

8
- (United States) **L Davenport**
- (United States) **L Raymond**
6
**7**
**6**

- (France) **M Pierce**
- (Hungary) **A Temesvári**
**6**
5
**7**

- (France) M Pierce
- (Hungary) A Temesvári
**7**
6
3

- (United States) Z Garrison-Jackson
- (United States) C Rubin
1
**7**
5

- (France) **M Pierce**
- (Hungary) **A Temesvári**
**6**
**6**

4
- (Australia) E Smylie
- (Australia) R Stubbs
3
3

8
- (United States) L Davenport
- (United States) L Raymond
4
3

5
- (Spain) C Martínez
- (Latvia) L Neiland
4
3

2
- (United States) **L McNeil**
- (Spain) **A Sánchez Vicario**
**6**
**6**

- (Italy) **S Farina**
- (United States) **G Helgeson**
**6**
**6**

- (Italy) S Farina
- (United States) G Helgeson
2
3

- (Germany) W Probst
- (Germany) C Singer
0
1

WC
- (Argentina) **G Sabatini**
- (Netherlands) **B Schultz**
**6**
**6**

WC
- (Argentina) **G Sabatini**
- (Netherlands) **B Schultz**
**6**
**6**

WC
- (Argentina) G Sabatini
- (Netherlands) B Schultz
3
2

- (Austria) P Ritter
- (Slovakia) R Zrubáková
3
**6**
3

2
- (United States) **L McNeil**
- (Spain) **A Sánchez Vicario**
**6**
**6**

- (United States) **S Collins**
- (South Africa) **M de Swardt**
**6**
4
**6**

- (United States) S Collins
- (South Africa) M de Swardt
4
4

2
- (United States) **L McNeil**
- (Spain) **A Sánchez Vicario**
**6**
**6**
