= 1995 Family Circle Cup – Singles =

Singles
- 1995 Family Circle Cup

Final
- Champion: (Spain) Conchita Martínez
- Runner-up: (Bulgaria) Magdalena Maleeva
- Score: 6–1, 6–1

Details
- Draw: 56
- Seeds: 16

Events
Singles	Doubles
← 1994 ·	Family Circle Cup	· 1996 →

Defending champion Conchita Martínez defeated Magdalena Maleeva in the final, 6–1, 6–1 to win the singles tennis title at the 1995 Family Circle Cup.

== Seeds ==
A champion seed is indicated in bold text while text in italics indicates the round in which that seed was eliminated. The top eight seeds received a bye to the second round.

1. (Spain) Arantxa Sánchez Vicario (quarterfinals)
2. (Spain) **Conchita Martínez (champion)**
3. (Argentina) Gabriela Sabatini (second round)
4. (Belarus) Natasha Zvereva (semifinals)
5. (Bulgaria) Magdalena Maleeva (final)
6. (Croatia) Iva Majoli (quarterfinals)
7. (United States) Lori McNeil (second round)
8. (Germany) Sabine Hack (second round)
9. (Austria) Judith Wiesner (second round)
10. (South Africa) Amanda Coetzer (third round)
11. (Argentina) Inés Gorrochategui (first round)
12. (United States) Zina Garrison-Jackson (first round)
13. (United States) Lisa Raymond (second round)
14. (Belgium) Sabine Appelmans (first round)
15. (Italy) Sandra Cecchini (first round)
16. (Romania) Irina Spîrlea (third round)

== Draw ==
=== Key ===
- Q = Qualifier
- WC = Wild card
- LL = Lucky loser
- Alt = Alternate
- SE = Special exempt
- PR = Protected ranking
- ITF = ITF entry
- JE = Junior exempt
- w/o = Walkover
- r = Retired
- d = Defaulted
- SR = Special ranking

=== Finals ===
Semifinals
5	(Bulgaria) **Magdalena Maleeva**	**6**	**7**
(Italy) Silvia Farina	4	6
4	(Belarus) Natasha Zvereva	1	2
2	(Spain) **Conchita Martínez**	**6**	**6**

Final
5	(Bulgaria) Magdalena Maleeva	1	1
2	(Spain) **Conchita Martínez**	**6**	**6**

=== Top half ===
==== Section 1 ====
First round
(Romania) **R Dragomir**	**6**	**6**
Q	(Czech Republic) L Richterová	4	2
(France) A Fusai	5	5
(Poland) **K Nowak**	**7**	**7**
Q	(Belarus) T Ignatieva	**7**	3	4
10	(South Africa) **A Coetzer**	5	**6**	**6**
12	(United States) Z Garrison-Jackson	1	**6**	4
(Israel) **A Smashnova**	**6**	2	**6**
(United States) **C Rubin**	**6**	**6**
(Slovakia) R Zrubáková	2	1
(Australia) **R McQuillan**	3	**6**	**6**
Q	(Spain) N Ávila Bonastre	**6**	1	0

Second round
1	(Spain) **A Sánchez Vicario**	3	**6**	**6**
(Romania) R Dragomir	**6**	1	3
(Poland) K Nowak	1	5
10	(South Africa) **A Coetzer**	**6**	**7**
(Israel) A Smashnova	**7**	3	4
(United States) **C Rubin**	5	**6**	**6**
(Australia) R McQuillan	3	**6**	4
5	(Bulgaria) **M Maleeva**	**6**	1	**6**

Third round
1	(Spain) **A Sánchez Vicario**	**7**	3	**6**
10	(South Africa) A Coetzer	6	**6**	3
(United States) C Rubin	3	2
5	(Bulgaria) **M Maleeva**	**6**	**6**

Quarterfinals
1	(Spain) A Sánchez Vicario
5	(Bulgaria) **M Maleeva**	**w/o**

==== Section 2 ====
First round
Q	(France) **L Ghirardi**	**6**	2	**6**
(United States) D Graham	2	**6**	3
Q	(France) **S Pitkowski**	3	**6**	**6**
(Czech Republic) R Bobková	**6**	2	1
WC	(United States) **L Lee**	**6**	**6**
15	(Italy) S Cecchini	3	2
14	(Belgium) S Appelmans	2	**6**	3
(Austria) **P Schwarz**	**6**	2	**6**
(Netherlands) **M Oremans**	**6**	3	**7**
Q	(Italy) A Serra Zanetti	1	**6**	6
(Germany) V Martinek	6	1	r
(Italy) **S Farina**	**7**	**4**

Second round
3	(Argentina) G Sabatini	**6**	6	3
Q	(France) **L Ghirardi**	3	**7**	**6**
Q	(France) **S Pitkowski**	**6**	**6**
WC	(United States) L Lee	4	2
(Austria) **P Schwarz**	**6**	**6**
(Netherlands) M Oremans	2	2
(Italy) **S Farina**	**6**	**6**
7	(United States) L McNeil	3	1

Third round
Q	(France) **L Ghirardi**	**6**	2	**6**
Q	(France) S Pitkowski	4	**6**	4
(Austria) P Schwarz	2	0
(Italy) **S Farina**	**6**	**6**

Quarterfinals
Q	(France) L Ghirardi	1	4
(Italy) **S Farina**	**6**	**6**

=== Bottom half ===
==== Section 3 ====
First round
WC	(South Africa) R Nideffer	2	1
(United States) **G Helgeson-Nielsen**	**6**	**6**
(Sweden) Å Carlsson	2	4
(Latvia) **L Neiland**	**6**	**6**
(South Africa) **J Kruger**	5	**6**	**7**
11	(Argentina) I Gorrochategui	**7**	4	6
13	(United States) **L Raymond**	**6**	**6**
(United States) N Arendt	3	4
(Canada) P Hy-Boulais	4	0
(United States) **S Cacic**	**6**	**6**
(Germany) **M Babel**	**7**	**6**
(Belgium) L Courtois	6	1

Second round
8	(Germany) S Hack	3	4
(United States) **G Helgeson-Nielsen**	**6**	**6**
(Latvia) **L Neiland**	4	**6**	**6**
(South Africa) J Kruger	**6**	4	4
13	(United States) L Raymond	**6**	3	5
(United States) **S Cacic**	1	**6**	**7**
(Germany) M Babel	**7**	0	3
4	(Belarus) **N Zvereva**	5	**6**	**6**

Third round
(United States) G Helgeson-Nielsen	1	**7**	6
(Latvia) **L Neiland**	**6**	5	**7**
(United States) S Cacic	5	5
4	(Belarus) **N Zvereva**	**7**	**7**

Quarterfinals
(Latvia) L Neiland	2	**6**	3
4	(Belarus) **N Zvereva**	**6**	3	**6**

==== Section 4 ====
First round
(Austria) S Dopfer	4	5	r
Q	(Spain) **V Ruano-Pascual**	**6**	**3**
(United States) **S Stafford**	**7**	**6**
(Bulgaria) E Pampoulova	5	4
Q	(United States) M Tu	4	**6**	4
16	(Romania) **I Spîrlea**	**6**	4	**6**
9	(Austria) **J Wiesner**	**6**	**6**
WC	(United States) J Steven	1	3
(Argentina) B Fulco-Villella	1	6
(Netherlands) **K Boogert**	**6**	**7**
(United States) A Grossman	2	0
(Russia) **E Makarova**	**6**	**6**

Second round
6	(Croatia) **I Majoli**	**6**	**6**
Q	(Spain) V Ruano-Pascual	0	0
(United States) S Stafford	6	0
16	(Romania) **I Spîrlea**	**7**	**6**
9	(Austria) J Wiesner	6	**6**	4
(Netherlands) **K Boogert**	**7**	4	**6**
(Russia) E Makarova	0	2
2	(Spain) **C Martínez**	**6**	**6**

Third round
6	(Croatia) **I Majoli**	**6**	**6**
16	(Romania) I Spîrlea	1	4
(Netherlands) K Boogert	2	5
2	(Spain) **C Martínez**	**6**	**7**

Quarterfinals
6	(Croatia) I Majoli	**6**	3	0
2	(Spain) **C Martínez**	2	**6**	**6**
