= 1996 Family Circle Cup – Doubles =

Doubles
- 1996 Family Circle Cup
- 1995 Champions: (United States) Nicole Arendt; (Netherlands) Manon Bollegraf

Final
- Champions: (Czech Republic) Jana Novotná (Spain) Arantxa Sánchez Vicario
- Runners-up: (United States) Gigi Fernández (United States) Mary Joe Fernández
- Score: 6–2, 6–3

Details
- Draw: 16
- Seeds: 4

Events
Singles	Doubles
← 1995 ·	Family Circle Cup	· 1997 →

Nicole Arendt and Manon Bollegraf were the defending champions but lost in the semifinals to Gigi Fernández and Mary Joe Fernández.

Jana Novotná and Arantxa Sánchez Vicario won in the final 6–2, 6–3 against the Fernándezes.

== Seeds ==
Champion seeds are indicated in bold text while text in italics indicates the round in which those seeds were eliminated.

1. (Czech Republic) **Jana Novotná** / (Spain) **Arantxa Sánchez Vicario (champions)**
2. (United States) Gigi Fernández / (United States) Mary Joe Fernández (final)
3. (United States) Meredith McGrath / (Latvia) Larisa Neiland (semifinals)
4. (United States) Nicole Arendt / (Netherlands) Manon Bollegraf (semifinals)

== Draw ==
=== Key ===
- Q = Qualifier
- WC = Wild card
- LL = Lucky loser
- Alt = Alternate
- ITF = ITF entry
- PR = Protected ranking
- SR = Special ranking
- SE = Special exempt
- JE = Junior exempt
- JR = Junior Accelerator Programme entrant
- CO = College Accelerator Programme entrant
- NG = Next Gen Accelerator Program entrant
- w/o = Walkover
- r = Retired
- d = Defaulted

First round
1	(Czech Republic) **J Novotná** (Spain) **A Sánchez Vicario**	4	**7**	**6**
(Spain) C Martínez (Argentina) P Tarabini	**6**	5	2
(South Africa) A Coetzer (Bulgaria) M Maleeva	2	3
(Netherlands) **K Boogert** (Romania) **I Spîrlea**	**6**	**6**
3	(United States) **M McGrath** (Latvia) **L Neiland**	**6**	**6**
(Switzerland) M Hingis (Croatia) I Majoli	0	1
(United States) **K Adams** (South Africa) **M de Swardt**	**6**	6	**6**
(United States) Z Garrison-Jackson (France) N Tauziat	4	**7**	2
(United States) **L Raymond** (Argentina) **G Sabatini**	4	**7**	**6**
(United States) L Davenport (Australia) R Stubbs	**6**	6	4
(United States) L McNeil (Australia) E Smylie	1	1
4	(United States) **N Arendt** (Netherlands) **M Bollegraf**	**6**	**6**
(Canada) J Hetherington (United States) K Rinaldi-Stunkel	**7**	6	1
(France) **A Dechaume-Balleret** (Italy) **L Golarsa**	6	**7**	**6**
(France) A Fusai (Germany) W Probst	5	1
2	(United States) **G Fernández** (United States) **M J Fernández**	**7**	**6**

Quarterfinals
1	(Czech Republic) **J Novotná** (Spain) **A Sánchez Vicario**	4	**6**	**6**
(Netherlands) K Boogert (Romania) I Spîrlea	**6**	2	4
3	(United States) **M McGrath** (Latvia) **L Neiland**	6	**6**	**6**
(United States) K Adams (South Africa) M de Swardt	**7**	1	2
(United States) L Raymond (Argentina) G Sabatini	4	**7**	5
4	(United States) **N Arendt** (Netherlands) **M Bollegraf**	**6**	6	**7**
(France) A Dechaume-Balleret (Italy) L Golarsa	1	1
2	(United States) **G Fernández** (United States) **M J Fernández**	**6**	**6**

Semifinals
1	(Czech Republic) **J Novotná** (Spain) **A Sánchez Vicario**	**6**	**6**
3	(United States) M McGrath (Latvia) L Neiland	3	2
4	(United States) N Arendt (Netherlands) M Bollegraf	3	4
2	(United States) **G Fernández** (United States) **M J Fernández**	**6**	**6**

Final
1	(Czech Republic) **Jana Novotná** (Spain) **Arantxa Sánchez Vicario**	**6**	**6**
2	(United States) Gigi Fernández (United States) Mary Joe Fernández	2	3
