= 1995 Family Circle Cup – Doubles =

Doubles
- 1995 Family Circle Cup

Final
- Champions: (United States) Nicole Arendt; (Netherlands) Manon Bollegraf
- Runners-up: (United States) Gigi Fernández; (Belarus) Natasha Zvereva
- Score: 0–6, 6–3, 6–4

Details
- Draw: 28
- Seeds: 8

Events
Singles	Doubles
← 1994 ·	Family Circle Cup	· 1996 →

Lori McNeil and Arantxa Sánchez Vicario were the defending champions but they lost in the second round to Laurence Courtois and Irina Spîrlea.

Nicole Arendt and Manon Bollegraf won in the final 0–6, 6–3, 6–4 against Gigi Fernández and Natasha Zvereva.

== Seeds ==
Champion seeds are indicated in bold text while text in italics indicates the round in which those seeds were eliminated. The top four seeded teams received byes into the second round.

1. (United States) Gigi Fernández / (Belarus) Natasha Zvereva (final)
2. (United States) Lori McNeil / (Spain) Arantxa Sánchez Vicario (second round)
3. (Latvia) Larisa Neiland / (Argentina) Gabriela Sabatini (semifinals)
4. (United States) **Nicole Arendt** / (Netherlands) **Manon Bollegraf (champions)**
5. (South Africa) Amanda Coetzer / (Argentina) Inés Gorrochategui (first round)
6. (United States) Katrina Adams / (United States) Zina Garrison-Jackson (quarterfinals)
7. (Italy) Sandra Cecchini / (Italy) Laura Golarsa (first round)
8. (Spain) Conchita Martínez / (Argentina) Patricia Tarabini (quarterfinals)

== Draw ==
=== Key ===
- Q = Qualifier
- WC = Wild card
- LL = Lucky loser
- Alt = Alternate
- ITF = ITF entry
- PR = Protected ranking
- SR = Special ranking
- SE = Special exempt
- JE = Junior exempt
- JR = Junior Accelerator Programme entrant
- CO = College Accelerator Programme entrant
- NG = Next Gen Accelerator Program entrant
- w/o = Walkover
- r = Retired
- d = Defaulted

=== Final ===
Final

1
- (United States) Gigi Fernández
- (Belarus) Natasha Zvereva
**6**
3
4

4
- (United States) **Nicole Arendt**
- (Netherlands) **Manon Bollegraf**
0
**6**
**6**

=== Top half ===
First round

Second round

Quarterfinals

Semifinals

1
- (United States) **G Fernández**
- (Belarus) **N Zvereva**
**7**
**6**

- (Germany) **M Babel**
- (Italy) **S Farina**
1
**6**
**6**

- (Germany) M Babel
- (Italy) S Farina
6
2

- (Croatia) I Majoli
- (Austria) P Schwarz
**6**
0
3

1
- (United States) **G Fernández**
- (Belarus) **N Zvereva**
**6**
**7**

- (United States) **D Graham**
- (Canada) **J Hetherington**
3
**6**
**6**

- (United States) D Graham
- (Canada) J Hetherington
1
5

- (Belgium) S Appelmans
- (Netherlands) M Oremans
**6**
4
2

- (United States) **D Graham**
- (Canada) **J Hetherington**
**6**
**6**

- (United States) **A Grossman**
- (United States) **C Rubin**
**6**
**6**

- (United States) A Grossman
- (United States) C Rubin
4
1

5
- (South Africa) A Coetzer
- (Argentina) I Gorrochategui
2
2

1
- (United States) **G Fernández**
- (Belarus) **N Zvereva**
5
**6**
**6**

3
- (Latvia) L Neiland
- (Argentina) G Sabatini
**7**
4
1

3
- (Latvia) **L Neiland**
- (Argentina) **G Sabatini**
**6**
**6**

- (Czech Republic) **K Kroupová**
- (Slovakia) **R Zrubáková**
**6**
**6**

- (Czech Republic) K Kroupová
- (Slovakia) R Zrubáková
4
3

- (Sweden) Å Carlsson
- (Canada) R Simpson
4
1

3
- (Latvia) **L Neiland**
- (Argentina) **G Sabatini**
**6**
**7**

- (United Kingdom) **V Lake**
- (Australia) **L Pleming**
4
**6**
**6**

8
- (Spain) C Martínez
- (Argentina) P Tarabini
3
6

- (South Africa) J Kruger
- (United States) S Stafford
**6**
3
2

- (United Kingdom) V Lake
- (Australia) L Pleming
2
1

WC
- (Bulgaria) M Maleeva
- (South Africa) R Nideffer
**6**
1
0

8
- (Spain) **C Martínez**
- (Argentina) **P Tarabini**
**6**
**6**

8
- (Spain) **C Martínez**
- (Argentina) **P Tarabini**
3
**6**
**6**

=== Bottom half ===
First round

Second round

Quarterfinals

Semifinals

6
- (United States) **K Adams**
- (United States) **Z Garrison-Jackson**
**6**
6
**6**

- (Russia) E Makarova
- (Russia) E Maniokova
3
**7**
2

6
- (United States) **K Adams**
- (United States) **Z Garrison-Jackson**
**7**
**6**

- (United States) **G Helgeson-Nielsen**
- (Australia) **R McQuillan**
**6**
**7**

- (United States) G Helgeson-Nielsen
- (Australia) R McQuillan
6
4

- (Australia) K-A Guse
- (Canada) P Hy-Boulais
1
5

6
- (United States) K Adams
- (United States) Z Garrison-Jackson
3
**6**
5

- (Netherlands) **K Boogert**
- (Netherlands) **N Muns-Jagerman**
**7**
**6**

4
- (United States) **N Arendt**
- (Netherlands) **M Bollegraf**
**6**
1
**7**

- (Ukraine) O Lugina
- (Bulgaria) E Pampoulova
6
2

- (Netherlands) K Boogert
- (Netherlands) N Muns-Jagerman
4
5

4
- (United States) **N Arendt**
- (Netherlands) **M Bollegraf**
**6**
**7**

4
- (United States) **N Arendt**
- (Netherlands) **M Bollegraf**
**6**
**6**

7
- (Italy) S Cecchini
- (Italy) L Golarsa
6
**6**
3

- (Belgium) L Courtois
- (Romania) I Spîrlea
3
4

- (France) **A Fusai**
- (United Kingdom) **C Wood**
**7**
2
**6**

- (France) A Fusai
- (United Kingdom) C Wood
4
3

- (Canada) M Bernard
- (Canada) C Delisle
**6**
2
3

- (Sweden) **M Lindström**
- (Sweden) **M Strandlund**
**6**
**6**

- (Sweden) **M Lindström**
- (Sweden) **M Strandlund**
2
**6**
**6**

- (Sweden) M Lindström
- (Sweden) M Strandlund
**6**
2
0

Q
- (Spain) Á Montolio
- (Spain) V Ruano-Pascual
1
1

- (Belgium) **L Courtois**
- (Romania) **I Spîrlea**
2
**6**
**6**

- (Belgium) **L Courtois**
- (Romania) **I Spîrlea**
**6**
**6**

- (Belgium) **L Courtois**
- (Romania) **I Spîrlea**
**w/o**

2
- (United States) L McNeil
- (Spain) A Sánchez Vicario
