= 1996 Family Circle Cup – Singles =

Singles
- 1996 Family Circle Cup
- 1995 Champion: (Spain) Conchita Martínez

Final
- Champion: (Spain) Arantxa Sánchez Vicario
- Runner-up: (Austria) Barbara Paulus
- Score: 6–2, 2–6, 6–2

Details
- Draw: 28
- Seeds: 8

Events
Singles	Doubles
← 1995 ·	Family Circle Cup	· 1997 →

Arantxa Sánchez Vicario defeated Barbara Paulus in the final, 6–2, 2–6, 6–2 to win the singles tennis title at the 1996 Family Circle Cup.

Conchita Martínez was the two-time defending champion, but lost in the semifinals to Paulus.

== Seeds ==
A champion seed is indicated in bold text while text in italics indicates the round in which that seed was eliminated. The top four seeds received a bye to the second round.

1. (Spain) Conchita Martínez (semifinals)
2. (Spain) **Arantxa Sánchez Vicario (champion)**
3. (Croatia) Iva Majoli (quarterfinals)
4. (Argentina) Gabriela Sabatini (second round)
5. (Bulgaria) Magdalena Maleeva (second round)
6. (Czech Republic) Jana Novotná (semifinals)
7. (United States) Mary Joe Fernández (second round)
8. (France) Mary Pierce (second round)

== Draw ==
=== Key ===
- Q = Qualifier
- WC = Wild card
- LL = Lucky loser
- Alt = Alternate
- ITF = ITF entry
- PR = Protected ranking
- SR = Special ranking
- SE = Special exempt
- JE = Junior exempt
- JR = Junior Accelerator Programme entrant
- CO = College Accelerator Programme entrant
- NG = Next Gen Accelerator Program entrant
- w/o = Walkover
- r = Retired
- d = Defaulted

=== Final ===
Final
	(Austria) Barbara Paulus	2	**6**	2
2	(Spain) **Arantxa Sánchez Vicario**	**6**	2	**6**

=== Section 1 ===
First round
(United States) Z Garrison-Jackson	4	0
Q	(Italy) **S Farina**	**6**	**6**
Q	(Austria) P Schwarz	2	3
(Germany) **P Begerow**	**6**	**6**
(United States) G Fernández	**7**	3	1
8	(France) **M Pierce**	6	**6**	**6**
LL	(Romania) R Dragomir	**6**	4	1
(Romania) **I Spîrlea**	3	**6**	**6**
(Austria) **B Paulus**	**6**	4	**6**
(France) N Tauziat	3	**6**	1
(United States) L Raymond	2	6
5	(Bulgaria) **M Maleeva**	**6**	**7**

Second round
1	(Spain) **C Martínez**	**6**	**6**
Q	(Italy) S Farina	1	2
(Germany) **P Begerow**	1	**7**	**6**
8	(France) M Pierce	**6**	5	1
4	(Argentina) G Sabatini	4	2
(Romania) **I Spîrlea**	**6**	**6**
(Austria) **B Paulus**	3	**7**	**6**
5	(Bulgaria) M Maleeva	**6**	6	4

Quarterfinals
1	(Spain) **C Martínez**	**6**	**6**
(Germany) P Begerow	2	0
(Romania) I Spîrlea	2	4
(Austria) **B Paulus**	**6**	**6**

Semifinals
1	(Spain) C Martínez	6	4
(Austria) **B Paulus**	**7**	**6**

=== Section 2 ===
First round
6	(Czech Republic) **J Novotná**	**6**	5	**6**
(Sweden) Å Carlsson	1	**7**	3
Q	(France) **A Fusai**	**6**	**6**
WC	(United States) K Rinaldi-Stunkel	1	4
(South Africa) **A Coetzer**	4	**6**	**6**
(Netherlands) K Boogert	**6**	1	3
7	(United States) **M J Fernández**	**6**	**6**
(South Africa) J Kruger	1	1
(South Africa) M de Swardt	3	4
Q	(Germany) **S Hack**	**6**	**6**
(Indonesia) Y Basuki	3	2
(Switzerland) **M Hingis**	**6**	**6**

Second round
6	(Czech Republic) **J Novotná**	**6**	**7**
Q	(France) A Fusai	2	5
(South Africa) A Coetzer	6	3
3	(Croatia) **I Majoli**	**7**	**6**
7	(United States) M J Fernández	2	4
Q	(Germany) **S Hack**	**6**	**6**
(Switzerland) M Hingis	**6**	2	2
2	(Spain) **A Sánchez Vicario**	0	**6**	**6**

Quarterfinals
6	(Czech Republic) **J Novotná**	4	**6**	**6**
3	(Croatia) I Majoli	**6**	2	3
Q	(Germany) S Hack	2	2
2	(Spain) **A Sánchez Vicario**	**6**	**6**

Semifinals
6	(Czech Republic) J Novotná	2	2
2	(Spain) **A Sánchez Vicario**	**6**	**6**
