= 1994 Family Circle Cup – Singles =

Singles
- 1994 Family Circle Cup

Final
- Champion: (Spain) Conchita Martínez
- Runner-up: (Belarus) Natasha Zvereva
- Score: 6–4, 6–0

Details
- Draw: 56
- Seeds: 16

Events
Singles	Doubles
- Family Circle Cup

Conchita Martínez defeated Natasha Zvereva in the final, 6–4, 6–0 to win the singles tennis title at the 1994 Family Circle Cup.

Steffi Graf was the reigning champion, but did not compete that year.

== Seeds ==
A champion seed is indicated in bold text while text in italics indicates the round in which that seed was eliminated. The top eight seeds received a bye to the second round.

1. (Spain) Arantxa Sánchez Vicario (quarterfinals)
2. (Spain) **Conchita Martínez (champion)**
3. (United States) Martina Navratilova (second round)
4. (Argentina) Gabriela Sabatini (second round)
5. (United States) Lindsay Davenport (quarterfinals)
6. (Belarus) Natasha Zvereva (final)
7. (France) Mary Pierce (semifinals)
8. (United States) Zina Garrison-Jackson (second round)
9. (South Africa) Amanda Coetzer (third round)
10. (Germany) Sabine Hack (third round)
11. (United States) Lori McNeil (first round)
12. (Netherlands) Brenda Schultz (third round)
13. (United States) Chanda Rubin (first round)
14. (Georgia (country)) Leila Meskhi (third round)
15. (United States) Ginger Helgeson (quarterfinals)
16. (Germany) Barbara Rittner (third round)

== Draw ==
Key

- Q = Qualifier
- WC = Wild card
- LL = Lucky loser
- Alt = Alternate
- ITF = ITF entry
- PR = Protected ranking
- SR = Special ranking
- SE = Special exempt
- JE = Junior exempt
- JR = Junior Accelerator Programme entrant
- CO = College Accelerator Programme entrant
- NG = Next Gen Accelerator Program entrant
- w/o = Walkover
- r = Retired
- d = Defaulted

=== Finals ===
Semifinals
7	(France) Mary Pierce	**6**	3	2
6	**(Belarus) Natasha Zvereva**	0	**6**	**6**
(Croatia) Iva Majoli	3	**7**	4
2	**(Spain) Conchita Martínez**	**6**	6	**6**

Final
6	(Belarus) Natasha Zvereva	4	0
2	**(Spain) Conchita Martínez**	**6**	**6**

=== Top half ===
==== Section 1 ====
First round
(Canada) H Kelesi	3	4
**(Netherlands) K Boogert**	**6**	**6**
**(United States) T Austin**	**6**	6	**6**
LL	(Argentina) M-J Gaidano	1	**7**	3
Q	(Germany) K Kschwendt	4	2
9	**(South Africa) A Coetzer**	**6**	**6**
12	**(Netherlands) B Schultz**	**6**	**6**
Q	(Slovakia) R Zrubáková	2	2
(United States) G Fernández	0	0
**(Germany) M Babel**	**6**	**6**
(Slovakia) J Husárová	1	2
Q	**(Spain) N Ávila Bonastre**	**6**	**6**

Second round
1	**(Spain) A Sánchez Vicario**	**6**	**6**
(Netherlands) K Boogert	1	1
(United States) T Austin	4	5
9	**(South Africa) A Coetzer**	**6**	**7**
12	**(Netherlands) B Schultz**	**6**	**6**
(Germany) M Babel	3	4
Q	(Spain) N Ávila Bonastre	2	1
7	**(France) M Pierce**	**6**	**6**

Third round
1	**(Spain) A Sánchez Vicario**	**7**	**6**
9	(South Africa) A Coetzer	6	2
12	(Netherlands) B Schultz	2	1
7	**(France) M Pierce**	**6**	**6**

Quarterfinals
1	(Spain) A Sánchez Vicario	4	**6**	1
7	**(France) M Pierce**	**6**	2	**6**

==== Section 2 ====
First round
WC	(Argentina) M Paz	1	3
(Argentina) **I Gorrochategui**	**6**	**6**
(Italy) **S Cecchini**	**6**	**7**
Q	(Austria) P Ritter	4	5
(United States) **C Kuhlman**	**6**	**6**
13	(United States) C Rubin	1	4
16	(Germany) **B Rittner**	**6**	**6**
(Belgium) L Courtois	3	2
(Australia) K Radford	3	5
(Latvia) **L Neiland**	**6**	**7**
Q	(France) N van Lottum	1	4
(United States) **L Raymond**	**6**	**6**

Second round
3	(United States) M Navratilova	**6**	5	5
(Argentina) **I Gorrochategui**	4	**7**	**7**
(Italy) **S Cecchini**	2	**6**	**6**
(United States) C Kuhlman	**6**	0	0
16	(Germany) **B Rittner**	**6**	6	**6**
(Latvia) L Neiland	3	**7**	1
(United States) L Raymond	3	**6**	4
6	(Belarus) **N Zvereva**	**6**	3	**6**

Third round
(Argentina) I Gorrochategui	5	6
(Italy) **S Cecchini**	**7**	**7**
16	(Germany) B Rittner	4	4
6	(Belarus) **N Zvereva**	**6**	**6**

Quarterfinals
(Italy) S Cecchini	**7**	3	0
6	(Belarus) **N Zvereva**	5	**6**	**6**

=== Bottom half ===
==== Section 3 ====
First round
(Canada) P Hy	1	4
(United States) **S Stafford**	**6**	**6**
(Italy) **S Farina**	**6**	**6**
(Russia) E Maniokova	1	1
(Switzerland) **E Zardo**	**7**	1	**6**
11	(United States) L McNeil	6	**6**	4
14	(Georgia (country)) **L Meskhi**	**6**	**6**
(Romania) I Spîrlea	2	2
WC	(United States) K Adams	2	6
(Germany) **W Probst**	**6**	**7**
(France) A Fusai	3	3
(Croatia) **I Majoli**	**6**	**6**

Second round
5	(United States) **L Davenport**	**6**	**6**
(United States) S Stafford	0	2
(Italy) S Farina	2	4
(Switzerland) **E Zardo**	**6**	**6**
14	(Georgia (country)) **L Meskhi**	**6**	**6**
(Germany) W Probst	1	2
(Croatia) **I Majoli**	**6**	2	**6**
4	(Argentina) G Sabatini	2	**6**	2

Third round
5	(United States) **L Davenport**	**7**	4	**6**
(Switzerland) E Zardo	6	**6**	2
14	(Georgia (country)) L Meskhi	4	**6**	4
(Croatia) **I Majoli**	**6**	1	**6**

Quarterfinals
5	(United States) L Davenport	5	**6**	2
(Croatia) **I Majoli**	**7**	1	**6**

==== Section 4 ====
First round
WC	(Netherlands) **M Bollegraf**	3	**7**	**6**
(Germany) C Singer	**6**	6	4
Q	(United States) **J Watanabe**	**6**	**6**
(Argentina) P Tarabini	1	2
Q	(Italy) L Garrone	1	4
15	(United States) **G Helgeson**	**6**	**6**
10	(Germany) **S Hack**	**6**	**7**
(Russia) E Makarova	1	5
(Czech Republic) **R Bobková**	**6**	5	**7**
(Romania) R Dragomir	2	**7**	6
(United States) A Grossman	2	2
Q	(South Africa) **J Kruger**	**6**	**6**

Second round
8	(United States) Z Garrison-Jackson	**6**	1	3
WC	(Netherlands) **M Bollegraf**	4	**6**	**6**
Q	(United States) J Watanabe	5	**6**	1
15	(United States) **G Helgeson**	**7**	2	**6**
10	(Germany) **S Hack**	**7**	**6**
(Czech Republic) R Bobková	6	3
Q	(South Africa) J Kruger	3	**6**	5
2	(Spain) **C Martínez**	**6**	4	**7**

Third round
WC	(Netherlands) M Bollegraf	2	**6**	6
15	(United States) **G Helgeson**	**6**	4	**7**
10	(Germany) S Hack	6	2
2	(Spain) **C Martínez**	**7**	**6**

Quarterfinals
15	(United States) G Helgeson	1	2
2	(Spain) **C Martínez**	**6**	**6**
