= WTA 1000 tournaments =

Tournament category in women's tennis

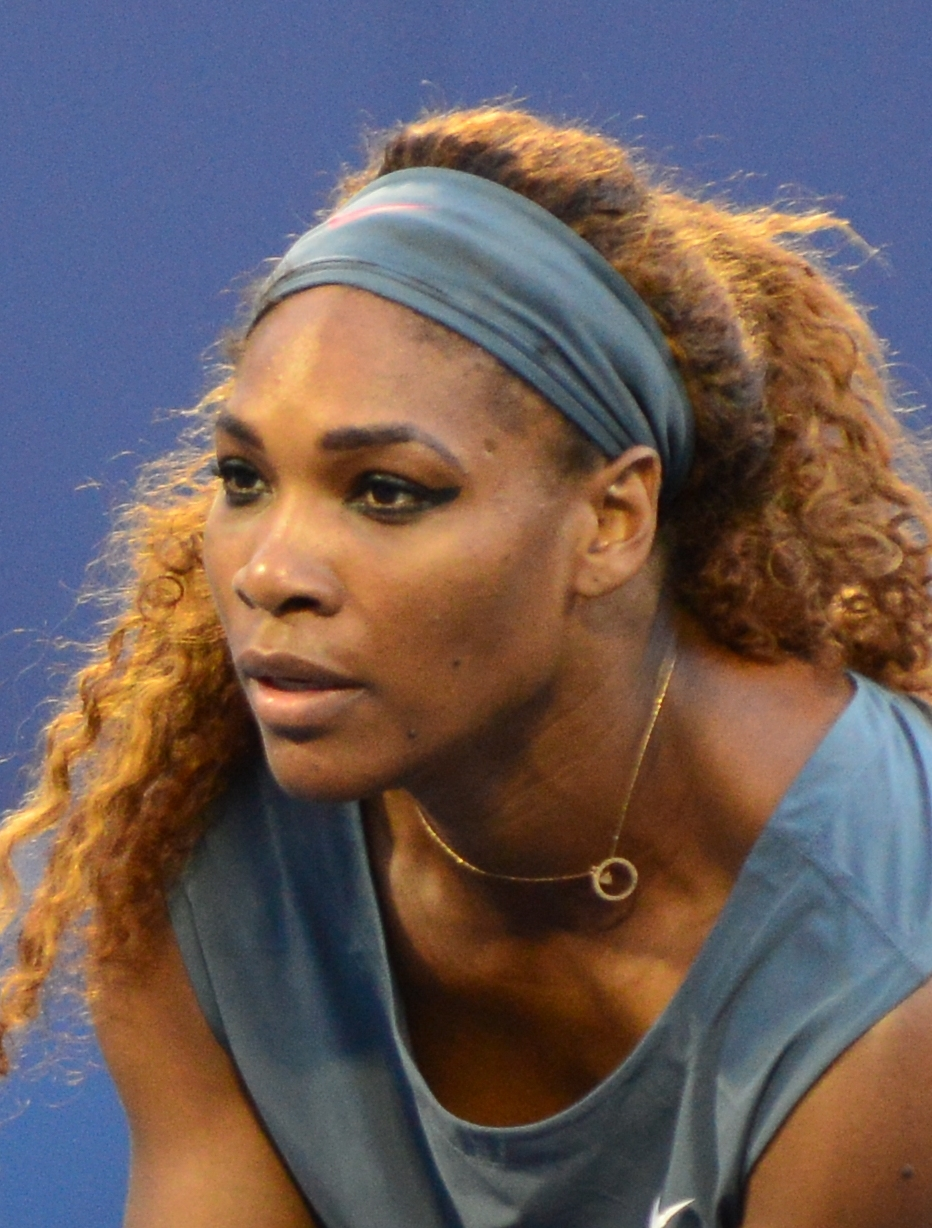
Serena Williams has won a record 23 WTA 1000 singles titles.

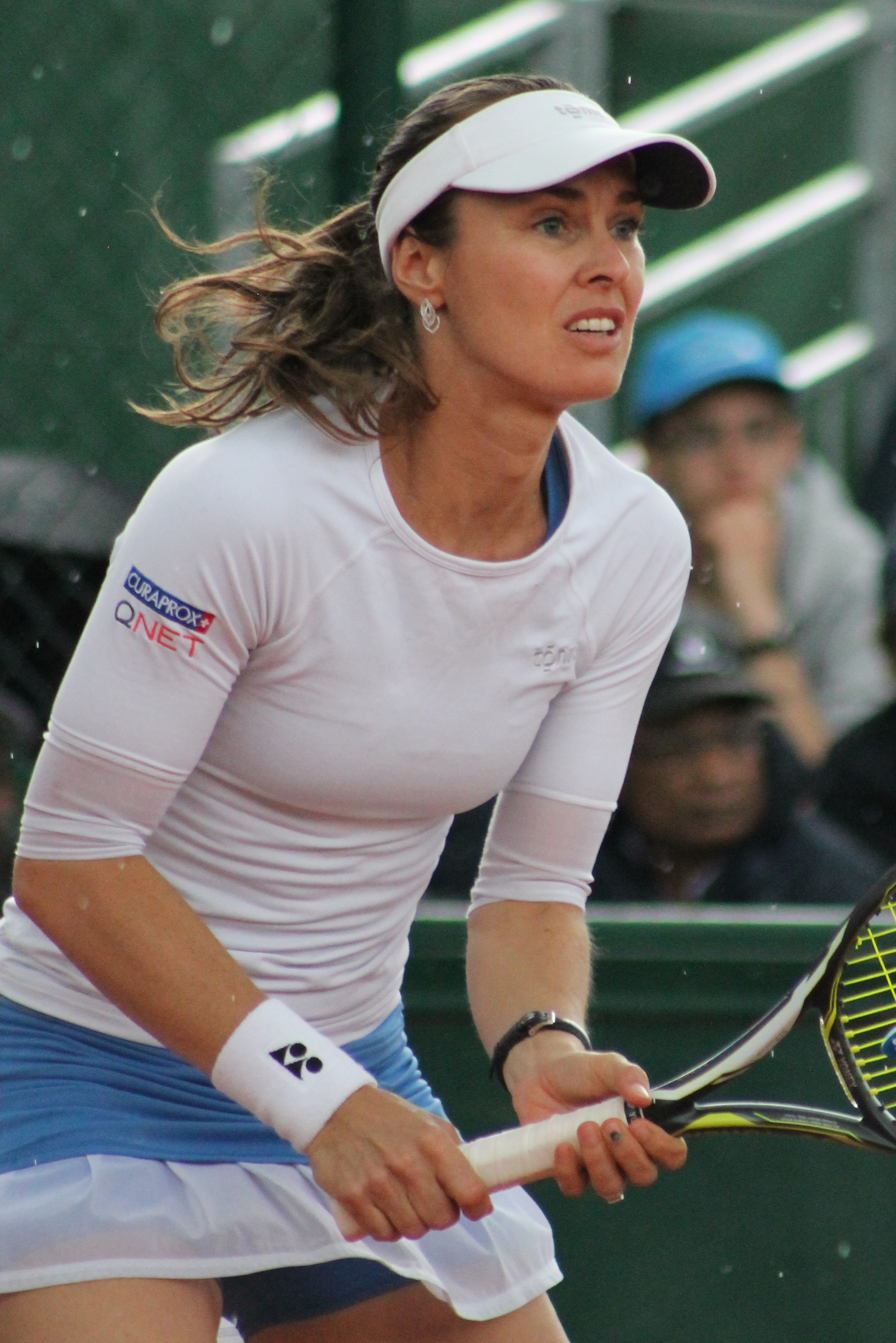
Martina Hingis has won a record 26 WTA 1000 titles in doubles.

The WTA 1000 tournaments are a category of tennis tournaments on the WTA Tour, governed by the Women's Tennis Association. The old WTA Premier Mandatory and Premier 5 tournaments merged into a single highest tier implemented in the 2021 schedule reorganization. Only four of the nine WTA 1000 tournaments were mandatory until 2024, when the category expanded to ten mandatory tournaments.

The ranking points awarded to the winners of these tournaments are 1,000. This compares to 2,000 points for winning a Grand Slam tournament ("major"), up to 1,500 points for winning the WTA Finals, 500 points for winning a WTA 500 tournament, and 250 for winning a WTA 250 tournament.

== History ==
Following the unification of the two women's tennis circuits that were managed within the WTA Tour in 1987 — the Virginia Slims Circuit and the ILTF Women's International Grand Prix Circuit — WTA 1000 tournaments were known as WTA Category 5 and WTA Category 6. Later renamed WTA Tier I tournaments in 1990, results in these tournaments would give players more points than almost every other tournament excluding Grand Slams and the year-end championships.

Prior to 2009, the WTA released a "Roadmap" outlining changes made to the tour in an effort to streamline the tour calendar. With this reform came the abolishment of the tier system, replaced by WTA Premier and WTA International categories. Pre-existing Tier I tournaments were split into two categories: Premier Mandatory, which required all top 10 players to attend, and Premier 5, which required at least seven top 10 players.

At the beginning of the 2021 season, the WTA announced they would once again revamp their tournament categorisation system to one reminiscent of the ATP Tour, in an effort to "create consistency between professional tennis". This revamp once again combined the Premier Mandatory and Premier 5 categories, though WTA 1000 tournaments were still split into mandatory and non-mandatory events, with less ranking points given to the latter. This was until 2024, when the WTA announced that all WTA 1000 tournaments would be mandatory.

=== Historic names ===
- 1990–2008: WTA Tier I
- 2009–2020: WTA Premier Mandatory / Premier 5
- 2021–present: WTA 1000

== Points distribution ==
The following ranking points are as of 2025.

Event		W	F	SF	QF	R16	R32	R64	R128	Q	Q3	Q2	Q1
Singles	96	1000	650	390	215	120	65	35	10 (Note: Players with byes receive first round points.)	30	N/A	20	2
Singles	56	1000	650	390	215	120	65	10	N/A	30	N/A	20	2
Doubles	28/32	1000	650	390	215	120	10	N/A					

== Tournaments ==
As of 2025, there are ten tournaments that are part of the WTA 1000. Eight of these tournaments are held on outdoor hardcourts whilst the other two are held on clay. Additionally, there are three tournaments that are considered WTA only: the Qatar Open, Dubai Tennis Championships and Wuhan Open.

When the WTA 1000 category was originally established, there were four mandatory tournaments (Indian Wells, Miami, Madrid and Beijing) and five non-mandatory tournaments (Dubai, Rome, Canada, Cincinnati and Wuhan), though Beijing and Wuhan were both cancelled that year. Wuhan Open was temporarily replaced by the Guadalajara Open in 2022, following the cancellation of the two Chinese tournaments for the second year in a row, though Beijing returned the following year.

The 2024 season saw all WTA 1000 tournaments become mandatory. Wuhan returned whilst Guadalajara was demoted to a WTA 500 tournament. Doha and Dubai, which had been alternating between WTA 1000 and WTA 500 status every year since 2015, both became permanent WTA 1000 tournaments.

=== Current ===
Tournament	Location	Venue	Surface	Draw	Date
Qatar Open	Doha, Qatar	Khalifa International Tennis and Squash Complex	Hard	56	9–15 February
Dubai Championships	Dubai, United Arab Emirates	Aviation Club Tennis Centre	Hard	56	16–22 February
Indian Wells Open	Indian Wells, United States	Indian Wells Tennis Garden	Hard	96	5–16 March
Miami Open	Miami Gardens, United States	Hard Rock Stadium	Hard	96	18–30 March
Madrid Open	Madrid, Spain	Caja Mágica	Clay	96	22 April−4 May
Italian Open	Rome, Italy	Foro Italico	Clay	96	6–18 May
Canadian Open	Toronto / Montreal, Canada (Note: The women's event is held in Montreal during odd years and Toronto during even years, alternating with the men's event.)	IGA Stadium / Sobeys Stadium	Hard	96	27 July–7 August
Cincinnati Open	Cincinnati, United States	Lindner Family Tennis Center	Hard	96	4–18 August
China Open	Beijing, China	China National Tennis Center	Hard	96	24 September–5 October
Wuhan Open	Wuhan, China	Optics Valley International Tennis Center	Hard	56	6–12 October

=== Past ===
Tournament	Location	Venue	Surface	Status
Ameritech Cup	Chicago,			
Virginia Slims of Florida	Boca Raton			
Pan Pacific Open	Tokyo,			
Charleston Open	Hilton Head/Charleston			
German Open	Berlin,			
Advanta Championships of Philadelphia	Philadelphia,			
Kremlin Cup	Moscow,			
Zurich Open	Zurich			
San Diego Open	San Diego			
Guadalajara Open Akron	Guadalajara,			

Location map of current WTA 1000 events.

== 2026 finals ==
* First-time champion

Tournament	Singles champions	Runners-up	Score	Doubles champions	Runners-up	Score
Qatar Open Singles – Doubles	(Czech Republic) Karolína Muchová*	(Canada) Victoria Mboko	6–4, 7–5	(Kazakhstan) Anna Danilina	(Chinese Taipei) Hsieh Su-wei (Latvia) Jeļena Ostapenko	0–6, 7–6^{(7–3)}, [10–8]
Qatar Open Singles – Doubles	(Czech Republic) Karolína Muchová*	(Canada) Victoria Mboko	6–4, 7–5	(Serbia) Aleksandra Krunić*	(Chinese Taipei) Hsieh Su-wei (Latvia) Jeļena Ostapenko	0–6, 7–6^{(7–3)}, [10–8]
Dubai Championships Singles – Doubles	(United States) Jessica Pegula	(Ukraine) Elina Svitolina	6–2, 6–4	(Canada) Gabriela Dabrowski (Brazil) Luisa Stefani	(Germany) Laura Siegemund; Vera Zvonareva	6–1, 6–3
Indian Wells Open Singles – Doubles	Aryna Sabalenka	(Kazakhstan) Elena Rybakina	3–6, 6–3, 7–6^{(8–6)}	(Czech Republic) Kateřina Siniaková (United States) Taylor Townsend	(Kazakhstan) Anna Danilina (Serbia) Aleksandra Krunić	7–6^{(7–4)}, 6–4
Miami Open Singles – Doubles	Aryna Sabalenka (2)	(United States) Coco Gauff	6–2, 4–6, 6–3	(Czech Republic) Kateřina Siniaková (2) (United States) Taylor Townsend (2)	(Italy) Sara Errani (Italy) Jasmine Paolini	7–6^{(7–0)}, 6–1
Madrid Open Singles – Doubles	(Ukraine) Marta Kostyuk*	Mirra Andreeva	6–3, 7–5	(Czech Republic) Kateřina Siniaková (3) (United States) Taylor Townsend (3)	Mirra Andreeva; Diana Shnaider	7–6^{(7–2)}, 6–2
Italian Open Singles – Doubles	(Ukraine) Elina Svitolina	(United States) Coco Gauff	6–4, 6–7^{(3–7)}, 6–2	Mirra Andreeva; Diana Shnaider	(Spain) Cristina Bucșa (United States) Nicole Melichar-Martinez	6–3, 6–3
Canadian Open Singles – Doubles	(Poland) Iga Świątek	(Kazakhstan) Elena Rybakina	6–2, 6–3	(Czech Republic) Kateřina Siniaková (4) (China) Zhang Shuai	(Italy) Sara Errani (United States) Nicole Melichar-Martinez	6–3, 6–4
Cincinnati Open Singles – Doubles	(United States) Coco Gauff	(United States) Jessica Pegula	6–2, 6–4	(Czech Republic) Marie Bouzková	(Belgium) Magali Kempen; Alexandra Panova	6–1, 6–2
Cincinnati Open Singles – Doubles	(United States) Coco Gauff	(United States) Jessica Pegula	6–2, 6–4	(Czech Republic) Linda Nosková*	(Belgium) Magali Kempen; Alexandra Panova	6–1, 6–2
China Open Singles – Doubles	(China) Zheng Qinwen*	Mirra Andreeva	7–5, 6–4	(Canada) Gabriela Dabrowski (2) (Brazil) Luisa Stefani (2)	(Czech Republic) Kateřina Siniaková (China) Zhang Shuai	6–1, 6–2
Wuhan Open Singles – Doubles	(Poland) Maja Chwalińska*	(United Kingdom) Sonay Kartal	2–6, 6–4, 6–2	(Canada) Gabriela Dabrowski (3) (Brazil) Luisa Stefani (3)	(Czech Republic) Kateřina Siniaková (Australia) Storm Hunter	7–5, 6–4

== Past finals ==
* First-time champion

=== 1990 ===
Tournament	Singles champions	Runners-up	Score	Doubles champions	Runners-up	Score
Chicago Open Singles – Doubles	(United States) Martina Navratilova*	(Switzerland) Manuela Maleeva	6–3, 6–2	(United States) Martina Navratilova* (United States) Anne Smith*	(Spain) Arantxa Sánchez Vicario (France) Nathalie Tauziat	6–7^{(9–11)}, 6–4, 6–3
Miami Open Singles – Doubles	(Socialist Federal Republic of Yugoslavia) Monica Seles*	(Austria) Judith Wiesner	6–1, 6–2	(Czechoslovakia) Jana Novotná* (Czechoslovakia) Helena Suková*	(United States) Betsy Nagelsen (United States) Robin White	6–4, 6–3
Hilton Head Open Singles – Doubles	(United States) Martina Navratilova	(United States) Jennifer Capriati	6–2, 6–4	(United States) Martina Navratilova	(Argentina) Mercedes Paz (Soviet Union) Natasha Zvereva	6–2, 6–1
Hilton Head Open Singles – Doubles	(United States) Martina Navratilova	(United States) Jennifer Capriati	6–2, 6–4	(Spain) Arantxa Sánchez Vicario*	(Argentina) Mercedes Paz (Soviet Union) Natasha Zvereva	6–2, 6–1
Italian Open Singles – Doubles	(Socialist Federal Republic of Yugoslavia) Monica Seles	(United States) Martina Navratilova	6–1, 6–1	(Canada) Helen Kelesi* (Socialist Federal Republic of Yugoslavia) Monica Seles*	(Italy) Laura Garrone (Italy) Laura Golarsa	6–3, 6–4
German Open Singles – Doubles	(Socialist Federal Republic of Yugoslavia) Monica Seles	(West Germany) Steffi Graf	6–4, 6–3	(Australia) Nicole Provis* (South Africa) Elna Reinach*	(Australia) Hana Mandlíková (Czechoslovakia) Jana Novotná	6–2, 6–1
Canadian Open Singles – Doubles	(Germany) Steffi Graf*	(Bulgaria) Katerina Maleeva	6–1, 6–7^{(6–8)}, 6–3	(United States) Betsy Nagelsen* (Argentina) Gabriela Sabatini*	(Canada) Helen Kelesi (Italy) Raffaella Reggi	3–6, 6–2, 6–2

=== 1991 ===
Tournament	Singles champions	Runners-up	Score	Doubles champions	Runners-up	Score
Boca Raton Singles – Doubles	(Argentina) Gabriela Sabatini*	(Germany) Steffi Graf	6–4, 7–6^{(8–6)}	(Soviet Union) Larisa Savchenko-Neiland* (Soviet Union) Natasha Zvereva*	(United States) Meredith McGrath (United States) Anne Smith	6–4, 7–6 ^{(7–3)}
Miami Singles – Doubles	(Socialist Federal Republic of Yugoslavia) Monica Seles	(Argentina) Gabriela Sabatini	6–3, 7–5	(United States) Mary Joe Fernández* (United States) Zina Garrison*	(United States) Gigi Fernández (Czechoslovakia) Jana Novotná	6–4, 6–3
Hilton Head Singles – Doubles	(Argentina) Gabriela Sabatini	(Soviet Union) Leila Meskhi	6–1, 6–1	(Germany) Claudia Kohde-Kilsch*	(United States) Mary-Lou Daniels (South Africa) Lise Gregory	6–4, 6–0
Hilton Head Singles – Doubles	(Argentina) Gabriela Sabatini	(Soviet Union) Leila Meskhi	6–1, 6–1	(Soviet Union) Natasha Zvereva	(United States) Mary-Lou Daniels (South Africa) Lise Gregory	6–4, 6–0
Rome Singles – Doubles	(Argentina) Gabriela Sabatini	(Socialist Federal Republic of Yugoslavia) Monica Seles	6–3, 6–2	(United States) Jennifer Capriati*	(Australia) Nicole Provis (South Africa) Elna Reinach	7–5, 6–2
Rome Singles – Doubles	(Argentina) Gabriela Sabatini	(Socialist Federal Republic of Yugoslavia) Monica Seles	6–3, 6–2	(Socialist Federal Republic of Yugoslavia) Monica Seles	(Australia) Nicole Provis (South Africa) Elna Reinach	7–5, 6–2
Berlin Singles – Doubles	(Germany) Steffi Graf	(Spain) Arantxa Sánchez Vicario	6–3, 4–6, 7–6^{(8–6)}	(Soviet Union) Larisa Neiland (Soviet Union) Natasha Zvereva	(Australia) Nicole Provis (South Africa) Elna Reinach	6–3, 6–3
Toronto Singles – Doubles	(United States) Jennifer Capriati*	(Bulgaria) Katerina Maleeva	6–2, 6–3	(Soviet Union) Larisa Neiland (Soviet Union) Natasha Zvereva	(Germany) Claudia Kohde-Kilsch (Czechoslovakia) Helena Suková	1–6, 7–5, 6–2

=== 1992 ===
Tournament	Singles champions	Runners-up	Score	Doubles champions	Runners-up	Score
Boca Raton Singles – Doubles	(Germany) Steffi Graf	(Spain) Conchita Martínez	3–6, 6–2, 6–0	(Latvia) Larisa Neiland (Commonwealth of Independent States) Natalia Zvereva	(United States) Linda Harvey-Wild (Spain) Conchita Martínez	6–2, 6–2
Miami Singles – Doubles	(Spain) Arantxa Sánchez Vicario*	(Argentina) Gabriela Sabatini	6–1, 6–4	(Spain) Arantxa Sánchez Vicario (Latvia) Larisa Neiland	(Canada) Jill Hetherington (United States) Kathy Rinaldi	7–5, 5–7, 6–3
Hilton Head Singles – Doubles	(Argentina) Gabriela Sabatini	(Spain) Conchita Martínez	6–1, 6–4	(Spain) Arantxa Sánchez Vicario (Commonwealth of Independent States) Natalia Zvereva	(Czechoslovakia) Jana Novotná (Latvia) Larisa Neiland	6–4, 6–2
Rome Singles – Doubles	(Argentina) Gabriela Sabatini	(Federal Republic of Yugoslavia) Monica Seles	7–5, 6–4	(Federal Republic of Yugoslavia) Monica Seles (Czechoslovakia) Helena Suková	(Bulgaria) Katerina Maleeva (Germany) Barbara Rittner	6–1, 6–2
Berlin Singles – Doubles	(Germany) Steffi Graf	(Spain) Arantxa Sánchez Vicario	4–6, 7–5, 6–2	(Czechoslovakia) Jana Novotná (Latvia) Larisa Neiland	(United States) Gigi Fernández (Commonwealth of Independent States) Natalia Zvereva	7–6^{(7–5)}, 4–6, 7–5
Montréal Singles – Doubles	(Spain) Arantxa Sánchez Vicario	(Federal Republic of Yugoslavia) Monica Seles	6–3, 4–6, 6–4	(United States) Lori McNeil* (Australia) Rennae Stubbs*	(United States) Gigi Fernández (Commonwealth of Independent States) Natasha Zvereva	3–6, 7–5, 7–5

=== 1993 ===
Tournament	Singles champions	Runners-up	Score	Doubles champions	Runners-up	Score
Tokyo Singles – Doubles	(United States) Martina Navratilova	(Latvia) Larisa Savchenko-Neiland	6–2, 6–2	(United States) Martina Navratilova (Czech Republic) Helena Suková	(United States) Lori McNeil (Australia) Rennae Stubbs	6–4, 6–3
Miami Singles – Doubles	(Spain) Arantxa Sánchez Vicario	(Germany) Steffi Graf	6–4, 3–6, 6–3	(Latvia) Larisa Neiland (Czech Republic) Jana Novotná	(Canada) Jill Hetherington (United States) Kathy Rinaldi	6–2, 7–5
Hilton Head Singles – Doubles	(Germany) Steffi Graf	(Spain) Arantxa Sánchez Vicario	7–6^{(10–8)}, 6–1	(United States) Gigi Fernández*	(United States) Katrina Adams (Netherlands) Manon Bollegraf	6–3, 6–1
Hilton Head Singles – Doubles	(Germany) Steffi Graf	(Spain) Arantxa Sánchez Vicario	7–6^{(10–8)}, 6–1	(Belarus) Natasha Zvereva	(United States) Katrina Adams (Netherlands) Manon Bollegraf	6–3, 6–1
Rome Singles – Doubles	(Spain) Conchita Martínez*	(Argentina) Gabriela Sabatini	7–5, 6–1	(Czech Republic) Jana Novotná (Spain) Arantxa Sánchez Vicario	(United States) Mary Joe Fernández (United States) Zina Garrison-Jackson	6–4, 6–2
Berlin Singles – Doubles	(Germany) Steffi Graf	(Argentina) Gabriela Sabatini	7–6^{(7–3)}, 2–6, 6–4	(United States) Gigi Fernández (Belarus) Natasha Zvereva	(United States) Debbie Graham (Netherlands) Brenda Schultz	6–1, 6–3
Toronto Singles – Doubles	(Germany) Steffi Graf	(United States) Jennifer Capriati	6–1, 0–6, 6–3	(Latvia) Larisa Neiland (Czech Republic) Jana Novotná	(Spain) Arantxa Sánchez Vicario (Czech Republic) Helena Suková	6–1, 6–2
Zürich Singles – Doubles	(Switzerland) Manuela Maleeva*	(United States) Martina Navratilova	6–3, 7–6^{(7–1)}	(United States) Zina Garrison-Jackson (United States) Martina Navratilova	(United States) Gigi Fernández (Belarus) Natasha Zvereva	6–3, 5–7, 6–3
Philadelphia Singles – Doubles	(Spain) Conchita Martínez	(Germany) Steffi Graf	6–3, 6–3	(United States) Katrina Adams* (Netherlands) Manon Bollegraf*	(Spain) Conchita Martínez (Latvia) Larisa Neiland	6–2, 4–6, 7–6^{(9–7)}

=== 1994 ===
Tournament	Singles champions	Runners-up	Score	Doubles champions	Runners-up	Score
Tokyo Singles – Doubles	(Germany) Steffi Graf	(United States) Martina Navratilova	6–2, 6–4	(United States) Pam Shriver* (Australia) Elizabeth Smylie*	(Netherlands) Manon Bollegraf (United States) Martina Navratilova	6–3, 3–6, 7–6^{(7–3)}
Miami Singles – Doubles	(Germany) Steffi Graf	(Belarus) Natasha Zvereva	4–6, 6–1, 6–2	(United States) Gigi Fernández (Belarus) Natasha Zvereva	(United States) Patty Fendick (United States) Meredith McGrath	6–3, 6–1
Hilton Head Singles – Doubles	(Spain) Conchita Martínez	(Belarus) Natasha Zvereva	6–4, 6–0	(United States) Lori McNeil (Spain) Arantxa Sánchez Vicario	(United States) Gigi Fernández (Belarus) Natasha Zvereva	6–4, 4–1, ret.
Rome Singles – Doubles	(Spain) Conchita Martínez	(United States) Martina Navratilova	7–6^{(7–5)}, 6–4	(United States) Gigi Fernández (Belarus) Natasha Zvereva	(Argentina) Gabriela Sabatini (Netherlands) Brenda Schultz	6–1, 6–3
Berlin Singles – Doubles	(Germany) Steffi Graf	(Netherlands) Brenda Schultz	7–6^{(8–6)}, 6–4	(United States) Gigi Fernández (Belarus) Natasha Zvereva	(Czech Republic) Jana Novotná (Spain) Arantxa Sánchez Vicario	6–3, 7–6^{(7–2)}
Montréal Singles – Doubles	(Spain) Arantxa Sánchez Vicario	(Germany) Steffi Graf	7–5, 1–6, 7–6^{(7–4)}	(United States) Meredith McGrath*	(United States) Pam Shriver (Australia) Elizabeth Smylie	2–6, 6–2, 6–4
Montréal Singles – Doubles	(Spain) Arantxa Sánchez Vicario	(Germany) Steffi Graf	7–5, 1–6, 7–6^{(7–4)}	(Spain) Arantxa Sánchez Vicario	(United States) Pam Shriver (Australia) Elizabeth Smylie	2–6, 6–2, 6–4
Zürich Singles – Doubles	(Bulgaria) Magdalena Maleeva*	(Belarus) Natasha Zvereva	7–5, 3–6, 6–4	(Netherlands) Manon Bollegraf (United States) Martina Navratilova	(United States) Patty Fendick (United States) Meredith McGrath	7–6^{(7–3)}, 6–1
Philadelphia Singles – Doubles	(Germany) Anke Huber*	(France) Mary Pierce	6–0, 6–7^{(4–7)}, 7–5	(United States) Gigi Fernández (Belarus) Natasha Zvereva	(Argentina) Gabriela Sabatini (Netherlands) Brenda Schultz	4–6, 6–4, 6–2

=== 1995 ===
Tournament	Singles champions	Runners-up	Score	Doubles champions	Runners-up	Score
Tokyo Singles – Doubles	(Japan) Kimiko Date*	(United States) Lindsay Davenport	6–1, 6–2	(United States) Gigi Fernández (Belarus) Natalia Zvereva	(United States) Lindsay Davenport (Australia) Rennae Stubbs	6–0, 6–3
Miami Singles – Doubles	(Germany) Steffi Graf	(Japan) Kimiko Date	6–1, 6–4	(Czech Republic) Jana Novotná (Spain) Arantxa Sánchez Vicario	(United States) Gigi Fernández (Belarus) Natalia Zvereva	7–5, 2–6, 6–3
Hilton Head Singles – Doubles	(Spain) Conchita Martínez	(Bulgaria) Magdalena Maleeva	6–1, 6–1	(United States) Nicole Arendt*	(United States) Gigi Fernández (Belarus) Natalia Zvereva	0–6, 6–3, 6–4
Hilton Head Singles – Doubles	(Spain) Conchita Martínez	(Bulgaria) Magdalena Maleeva	6–1, 6–1	(Netherlands) Manon Bollegraf	(United States) Gigi Fernández (Belarus) Natalia Zvereva	0–6, 6–3, 6–4
Rome Singles – Doubles	(Spain) Conchita Martínez	(Spain) Arantxa Sánchez Vicario	6–3, 6–1	(United States) Gigi Fernández (Belarus) Natalia Zvereva	(Spain) Conchita Martínez (Argentina) Patricia Tarabini	3–6, 7–6, 6–4
Berlin Singles – Doubles	(Spain) Arantxa Sánchez Vicario	(Bulgaria) Magdalena Maleeva	6–4, 6–1	(South Africa) Amanda Coetzer* (Argentina) Inés Gorrochategui*	(Latvia) Larisa Neiland (Argentina) Gabriela Sabatini	4–6, 7–6, 6–2
Toronto Singles – Doubles	(United States) Monica Seles	(South Africa) Amanda Coetzer	6–0, 6–1	(Argentina) Gabriela Sabatini	(Switzerland) Martina Hingis (Croatia) Iva Majoli	4–6, 6–0, 6–3
Toronto Singles – Doubles	(United States) Monica Seles	(South Africa) Amanda Coetzer	6–0, 6–1	(Netherlands) Brenda Schultz-McCarthy*	(Switzerland) Martina Hingis (Croatia) Iva Majoli	4–6, 6–0, 6–3
Zürich Singles – Doubles	(Croatia) Iva Majoli*	(France) Mary Pierce	6–4, 6–4	(United States) Nicole Arendt (Netherlands) Manon Bollegraf	(United States) Chanda Rubin (Netherlands) Caroline Vis	6–4, 6–7^{(4–7)}, 6–4
Philadelphia Singles – Doubles	(Germany) Steffi Graf	(United States) Lori McNeil	6–1, 4–6, 6–3	(United States) Lori McNeil (Czech Republic) Helena Suková	(United States) Meredith McGrath (Latvia) Larisa Neiland	4–6, 6–3, 6–4

=== 1996 ===
Tournament	Singles champions	Runners-up	Score	Doubles champions	Runners-up	Score
Tokyo Singles – Doubles	(Croatia) Iva Majoli	(Spain) Arantxa Sánchez Vicario	6–4, 6–1	(United States) Gigi Fernández (Belarus) Natasha Zvereva	(South Africa) Mariaan de Swardt (Romania) Irina Spîrlea	7–6, 6–3
Indian Wells Singles – Doubles	(Germany) Steffi Graf	(Spain) Conchita Martínez	7–6^{(7–5)}, 7–6^{(7–5)}	(United States) Chanda Rubin*	(France) Julie Halard-Decugis (France) Nathalie Tauziat	6–1, 6–4
Indian Wells Singles – Doubles	(Germany) Steffi Graf	(Spain) Conchita Martínez	7–6^{(7–5)}, 7–6^{(7–5)}	(Netherlands) Brenda Schultz-McCarthy	(France) Julie Halard-Decugis (France) Nathalie Tauziat	6–1, 6–4
Miami Singles – Doubles	(Germany) Steffi Graf	(United States) Chanda Rubin	6–1, 6–3	(Czech Republic) Jana Novotná (Spain) Arantxa Sánchez Vicario	(United States) Meredith McGrath (Latvia) Larisa Neiland	6–4, 6–4
Hilton Head Singles – Doubles	(Spain) Arantxa Sánchez Vicario	(Austria) Barbara Paulus	6–2, 2–6, 6–2	(Czech Republic) Jana Novotná (Spain) Arantxa Sánchez Vicario	(United States) Gigi Fernández (United States) Mary Joe Fernández	6–2, 6–3
Rome Singles – Doubles	(Spain) Conchita Martínez	(Switzerland) Martina Hingis	6–2, 6–3	(Spain) Arantxa Sánchez Vicario	(United States) Gigi Fernández (Switzerland) Martina Hingis	6–4, 3–6, 6–3
Rome Singles – Doubles	(Spain) Conchita Martínez	(Switzerland) Martina Hingis	6–2, 6–3	(Romania) Irina Spîrlea*	(United States) Gigi Fernández (Switzerland) Martina Hingis	6–4, 3–6, 6–3
Berlin Singles – Doubles	(Germany) Steffi Graf	(Slovakia) Karina Habšudová	4–6, 6–2, 7–5	(United States) Meredith McGrath (Latvia) Larisa Neiland	(Switzerland) Martina Hingis (Czech Republic) Helena Suková	6–1, 5–7, 7–6^{(7–4)}
Montréal Singles – Doubles	(United States) Monica Seles	(Spain) Arantxa Sánchez Vicario	6–1, 7–6^{(7–2)}	(Latvia) Larisa Neiland (Spain) Arantxa Sánchez Vicario	(United States) Mary Joe Fernández (Czech Republic) Helena Suková	7–6, 6–1
Zürich Singles – Doubles	(Czech Republic) Jana Novotná*	(Switzerland) Martina Hingis	6–2, 6–2	(Switzerland) Martina Hingis*	(United States) Nicole Arendt (Belarus) Natasha Zvereva	7–5, 6–4
Zürich Singles – Doubles	(Czech Republic) Jana Novotná*	(Switzerland) Martina Hingis	6–2, 6–2	(Czech Republic) Helena Suková	(United States) Nicole Arendt (Belarus) Natasha Zvereva	7–5, 6–4

=== 1997 ===
Tournament	Singles champions	Runners-up	Score	Doubles champions	Runners-up	Score
Tokyo Singles – Doubles	(Switzerland) Martina Hingis*	(Germany) Steffi Graf	Walkover	(United States) Lindsay Davenport*	(United States) Gigi Fernández (Switzerland) Martina Hingis	6–4, 6–3
Tokyo Singles – Doubles	(Switzerland) Martina Hingis*	(Germany) Steffi Graf	Walkover	(Belarus) Natasha Zvereva	(United States) Gigi Fernández (Switzerland) Martina Hingis	6–4, 6–3
Indian Wells Singles – Doubles	(United States) Lindsay Davenport*	(Romania) Irina Spîrlea	6–2, 6–1	(United States) Lindsay Davenport (Belarus) Natasha Zvereva	(United States) Lisa Raymond (France) Nathalie Tauziat	6–3, 6–2
Miami Singles – Doubles	(Switzerland) Martina Hingis	(United States) Monica Seles	6–2, 6–1	(Spain) Arantxa Sánchez Vicario (Belarus) Natasha Zvereva	(Belgium) Sabine Appelmans (Netherlands) Miriam Oremans	6–2, 6–3
Hilton Head Singles – Doubles	(Switzerland) Martina Hingis	(United States) Monica Seles	3–6, 6–3, 7–6^{(7–5)}	(United States) Mary Joe Fernandez (Switzerland) Martina Hingis	(United States) Lindsay Davenport (Czech Republic) Jana Novotná	7–5, 4–6, 6–1
Rome Singles – Doubles	(France) Mary Pierce*	(Spain) Conchita Martínez	6–4, 6–0	(United States) Nicole Arendt (Netherlands) Manon Bollegraf	(Spain) Conchita Martínez (Argentina) Patricia Tarabini	6–2, 6–4
Berlin Singles – Doubles	(United States) Mary Joe Fernández*	(France) Mary Pierce	6–4, 6–2	(United States) Lindsay Davenport (Czech Republic) Jana Novotná	(United States) Gigi Fernández (Belarus) Natasha Zvereva	6–3, 3–6, 6–2
Toronto Singles – Doubles	(United States) Monica Seles	(Germany) Anke Huber	6–2, 6–4	(Indonesia) Yayuk Basuki* (Netherlands) Caroline Vis*	(United States) Nicole Arendt (Netherlands) Manon Bollegraf	3–6, 7–5, 6–4
Zürich Singles – Doubles	(United States) Lindsay Davenport	(France) Nathalie Tauziat	7–6^{(7–3)}, 7–5	(Switzerland) Martina Hingis (Spain) Arantxa Sánchez Vicario	(Latvia) Larisa Neiland (Czech Republic) Helena Suková	4–6, 6–4, 6–1
Moscow Singles – Doubles	(Czech Republic) Jana Novotná	(Japan) Ai Sugiyama	6–3, 6–4	(Spain) Arantxa Sánchez Vicario (Belarus) Natasha Zvereva	(Indonesia) Yayuk Basuki (Netherlands) Caroline Vis	5-3, def.

=== 1998 ===
Tournament	Singles champions	Runners-up	Score	Doubles champions	Runners-up	Score
Tokyo Singles – Doubles	(United States) Lindsay Davenport	(Switzerland) Martina Hingis	6–3, 6–3	(Switzerland) Martina Hingis	(United States) Lindsay Davenport (Belarus) Natasha Zvereva	7–5, 6–4
Tokyo Singles – Doubles	(United States) Lindsay Davenport	(Switzerland) Martina Hingis	6–3, 6–3	(Croatia) Mirjana Lučić*	(United States) Lindsay Davenport (Belarus) Natasha Zvereva	7–5, 6–4
Indian Wells Singles – Doubles	(Switzerland) Martina Hingis	(United States) Lindsay Davenport	6–3, 6–4	(United States) Lindsay Davenport (Belarus) Natasha Zvereva	(France) Alexandra Fusai (France) Nathalie Tauziat	6–4, 2–6, 6–4
Miami Singles – Doubles	(United States) Venus Williams*	(Russia) Anna Kournikova	2–6, 6–4, 6–1	(Switzerland) Martina Hingis (Czech Republic) Jana Novotná	(Spain) Arantxa Sánchez Vicario (Belarus) Natasha Zvereva	6–2, 3–6, 6–3
Hilton Head Singles – Doubles	(South Africa) Amanda Coetzer*	(Romania) Irina Spîrlea	6–3, 6–4	(Spain) Conchita Martínez* (Argentina) Patricia Tarabini*	(United States) Lisa Raymond (Australia) Rennae Stubbs	3–6, 6–4, 6–4
Rome Singles – Doubles	(Switzerland) Martina Hingis	(United States) Venus Williams	6–3, 2–6, 6–3	(Spain) Virginia Ruano Pascual* (Argentina) Paola Suárez*	(South Africa) Amanda Coetzer (Spain) Arantxa Sánchez Vicario	7–6^{(7–1)}, 6–4
Berlin Singles – Doubles	(Spain) Conchita Martínez	(France) Amélie Mauresmo	6–4, 6–4	(United States) Lindsay Davenport (Belarus) Natasha Zvereva	(France) Alexandra Fusai (France) Nathalie Tauziat	6–3, 6–0
Montréal Singles – Doubles	(United States) Monica Seles	(Spain) Arantxa Sánchez Vicario	6–3, 6–2	(Switzerland) Martina Hingis (Czech Republic) Jana Novotná	(Indonesia) Yayuk Basuki (Netherlands) Caroline Vis	6–3, 6–4
Zürich Singles – Doubles	(United States) Lindsay Davenport	(United States) Venus Williams	6–3, 6–4	(United States) Serena Williams* (United States) Venus Williams*	(South Africa) Mariaan de Swardt (Ukraine) Elena Tatarkova	5–7, 6–1, 6–3
Moscow Singles – Doubles	(France) Mary Pierce	(United States) Monica Seles	7–6^{(7–2)}, 6–3	(France) Mary Pierce*	(United States) Lisa Raymond (Australia) Rennae Stubbs	6–3, 6–4
Moscow Singles – Doubles	(France) Mary Pierce	(United States) Monica Seles	7–6^{(7–2)}, 6–3	(Belarus) Natasha Zvereva	(United States) Lisa Raymond (Australia) Rennae Stubbs	6–3, 6–4

=== 1999 ===
Tournament	Singles champions	Runners-up	Score	Doubles champions	Runners-up	Score
Tokyo Singles – Doubles	(Switzerland) Martina Hingis	(South Africa) Amanda Coetzer	6–2, 6–1	(United States) Lindsay Davenport (Belarus) Natasha Zvereva	(Switzerland) Martina Hingis (Czech Republic) Jana Novotná	6–2, 6–3
Indian Wells Singles – Doubles	(United States) Serena Williams*	(Germany) Steffi Graf	6–3, 3–6, 7–5	(Switzerland) Martina Hingis	(United States) Mary Joe Fernández (Czech Republic) Jana Novotná	6–2, 6–2
Indian Wells Singles – Doubles	(United States) Serena Williams*	(Germany) Steffi Graf	6–3, 3–6, 7–5	(Russia) Anna Kournikova*	(United States) Mary Joe Fernández (Czech Republic) Jana Novotná	6–2, 6–2
Miami Singles – Doubles	(United States) Venus Williams	(United States) Serena Williams	6–1, 4–6, 6–4	(Switzerland) Martina Hingis (Czech Republic) Jana Novotná	(United States) Mary Joe Fernández (United States) Monica Seles	0–6, 6–4, 7–6^{(7–1)}
Hilton Head Singles – Doubles	(Switzerland) Martina Hingis	(Russia) Anna Kournikova	6–4, 6–3	(Russia) Elena Likhovtseva*	(Austria) Barbara Schett (Switzerland) Patty Schnyder	6–1, 6–4
Hilton Head Singles – Doubles	(Switzerland) Martina Hingis	(Russia) Anna Kournikova	6–4, 6–3	(Czech Republic) Jana Novotná	(Austria) Barbara Schett (Switzerland) Patty Schnyder	6–1, 6–4
Rome Singles – Doubles	(United States) Venus Williams	(France) Mary Pierce	6–4, 6–2	(Switzerland) Martina Hingis (Russia) Anna Kournikova	(France) Alexandra Fusai (France) Nathalie Tauziat	6–2, 6–2
Berlin Singles – Doubles	(Switzerland) Martina Hingis	(France) Julie Halard-Decugis	6–0, 6–1	(France) Alexandra Fusai* (France) Nathalie Tauziat*	(Czech Republic) Jana Novotná (Argentina) Patricia Tarabini	6–3, 7–5
Toronto Singles – Doubles	(Switzerland) Martina Hingis	(United States) Monica Seles	6–4, 6–4	(Czech Republic) Jana Novotná (France) Mary Pierce	(Spain) Arantxa Sánchez Vicario (Latvia) Larisa Neiland	6–3, 2–6, 6–3
Zürich Singles – Doubles	(United States) Venus Williams	(Switzerland) Martina Hingis	6–3, 6–4	(United States) Lisa Raymond*	(France) Nathalie Tauziat (Belarus) Natasha Zvereva	6–2, 6–2
Zürich Singles – Doubles	(United States) Venus Williams	(Switzerland) Martina Hingis	6–3, 6–4	(Australia) Rennae Stubbs	(France) Nathalie Tauziat (Belarus) Natasha Zvereva	6–2, 6–2
Moscow Singles – Doubles	(France) Nathalie Tauziat*	(Austria) Barbara Schett	2–6, 6–4, 6–1	(United States) Lisa Raymond (Australia) Rennae Stubbs	(France) Julie Halard-Decugis (Germany) Anke Huber	6–1, 6–0

=== 2000 ===
Tournament	Singles champions	Runners-up	Score	Doubles champions	Runners-up	Score
Tokyo Singles – Doubles	(Switzerland) Martina Hingis	(France) Sandrine Testud	6–3, 7–5	(Switzerland) Martina Hingis (France) Mary Pierce	(France) Alexandra Fusai (France) Nathalie Tauziat	6–4, 6–1
Indian Wells Singles – Doubles	(United States) Lindsay Davenport	(Switzerland) Martina Hingis	4–6, 6–4, 6–0	(United States) Lindsay Davenport	(Russia) Anna Kournikova (Belarus) Natasha Zvereva	6–2, 6–3
Indian Wells Singles – Doubles	(United States) Lindsay Davenport	(Switzerland) Martina Hingis	4–6, 6–4, 6–0	(United States) Corina Morariu*	(Russia) Anna Kournikova (Belarus) Natasha Zvereva	6–2, 6–3
Miami Singles – Doubles	(Switzerland) Martina Hingis	(United States) Lindsay Davenport	6–3, 6–2	(France) Julie Halard-Decugis* (Japan) Ai Sugiyama*	(United States) Nicole Arendt (Netherlands) Manon Bollegraf	4–6, 7–5, 6–4
Hilton Head Singles – Doubles	(France) Mary Pierce	(Spain) Arantxa Sánchez Vicario	6–1, 6–0	(Spain) Virginia Ruano Pascual (Argentina) Paola Suárez	(Spain) Conchita Martínez (Argentina) Patricia Tarabini	7–5, 6–3
Berlin Singles – Doubles	(Spain) Conchita Martínez	(South Africa) Amanda Coetzer	6–1, 6–2	(Spain) Conchita Martínez (Spain) Arantxa Sánchez Vicario	(South Africa) Amanda Coetzer (United States) Corina Morariu	3–6, 6–2, 7–6^{(9–7)}
Rome Singles – Doubles	(United States) Monica Seles	(France) Amélie Mauresmo	6–2, 7–6^{(7–4)}	(United States) Lisa Raymond (Australia) Rennae Stubbs	(Spain) Arantxa Sánchez Vicario (Spain) Magüi Serna	6–3, 4–6, 6–3
Montréal Singles – Doubles	(Switzerland) Martina Hingis	(United States) Serena Williams	0–6, 6–3, 3–0, ret.	(Switzerland) Martina Hingis (France) Nathalie Tauziat	(France) Julie Halard-Decugis (Japan) Ai Sugiyama	6–3, 3–6, 6–4
Zürich Singles – Doubles	(Switzerland) Martina Hingis	(United States) Lindsay Davenport	6–2, 4–6, 7–5	(Switzerland) Martina Hingis (Russia) Anna Kournikova	(United States) Kimberly Po (France) Anne-Gaëlle Sidot	6–3, 6–4
Moscow Singles – Doubles	(Switzerland) Martina Hingis	(Russia) Anna Kournikova	6–3, 6–1	(France) Julie Halard-Decugis (Japan) Ai Sugiyama	(Switzerland) Martina Hingis (Russia) Anna Kournikova	4–6, 6–4, 7–6^{(7–5)}

=== 2001 ===
Tournament	Singles champions	Runners-up	Score	Doubles champions	Runners-up	Score
Tokyo Singles – Doubles	(United States) Lindsay Davenport	(Switzerland) Martina Hingis	6–7^{(4–7)}, 6–4, 6–2	(United States) Lisa Raymond (Australia) Rennae Stubbs	(Russia) Anna Kournikova (Uzbekistan) Iroda Tulyaganova	7–6^{(7–5)}, 2–6, 7–6^{(8–6)}
Indian Wells Singles – Doubles	(United States) Serena Williams	(Belgium) Kim Clijsters	4–6, 6–4, 6–2	(United States) Nicole Arendt (Japan) Ai Sugiyama	(Spain) Virginia Ruano Pascual (Argentina) Paola Suárez	6–4, 6–4
Miami Singles – Doubles	(United States) Venus Williams	(United States) Jennifer Capriati	4–6, 6–1, 7–6^{(7–4)}	(Spain) Arantxa Sánchez Vicario (France) Nathalie Tauziat	(United States) Lisa Raymond (Australia) Rennae Stubbs	6–0, 6–4
Charleston Singles – Doubles	(United States) Jennifer Capriati	(Switzerland) Martina Hingis	6–0, 4–6, 6–4	(United States) Lisa Raymond (Australia) Rennae Stubbs	(Spain) Virginia Ruano Pascual (Argentina) Paola Suárez	5–7, 7–6^{(7–5)}, 6–3
Berlin Singles – Doubles	(France) Amélie Mauresmo*	(United States) Jennifer Capriati	6–4, 2–6, 6–3	(Belgium) Els Callens* (United States) Meghann Shaughnessy*	(Zimbabwe) Cara Black (Russia) Elena Likhovtseva	6–4, 6–3
Rome Singles – Doubles	(Serbia and Montenegro) Jelena Dokić*	(France) Amélie Mauresmo	7–6^{(7–3)}, 6–1	(Zimbabwe) Cara Black*	(Argentina) Paola Suárez (Argentina) Patricia Tarabini	6–1, 6–1
Rome Singles – Doubles	(Serbia and Montenegro) Jelena Dokić*	(France) Amélie Mauresmo	7–6^{(7–3)}, 6–1	(Russia) Elena Likhovtseva	(Argentina) Paola Suárez (Argentina) Patricia Tarabini	6–1, 6–1
Toronto Singles – Doubles	(United States) Serena Williams	(United States) Jennifer Capriati	6–1, 6–7^{(7–9)}, 6–3	(United States) Kimberly Po-Messerli* (Australia) Nicole Pratt*	(Slovenia) Tina Križan (Slovenia) Katarina Srebotnik	6–3, 6–1
Moscow Singles – Doubles	(Serbia and Montenegro) Jelena Dokić	(Russia) Elena Dementieva	6–3, 6–3	(Switzerland) Martina Hingis (Russia) Anna Kournikova	(Russia) Elena Dementieva (Russia) Lina Krasnoroutskaya	7–6^{(7–1)}, 6–3
Zürich Singles – Doubles	(United States) Lindsay Davenport	(Federal Republic of Yugoslavia) Jelena Dokić	6–3, 6–1	(United States) Lindsay Davenport (United States) Lisa Raymond	(France) Sandrine Testud (Italy) Roberta Vinci	6–3, 2–6, 6–2

=== 2002 ===
Tournament	Singles champions	Runners-up	Score	Doubles champions	Runners-up	Score
Tokyo Singles – Doubles	(Switzerland) Martina Hingis	(United States) Monica Seles	7–6^{(8–6)}, 4–6, 6–3	(United States) Lisa Raymond (Australia) Rennae Stubbs	(Belgium) Els Callens (Italy) Roberta Vinci	6–1, 6–1
Indian Wells Singles – Doubles	(Slovakia) Daniela Hantuchová*	(Switzerland) Martina Hingis	6–3, 6–4	(United States) Lisa Raymond (Australia) Rennae Stubbs	(Russia) Elena Dementieva (Slovakia) Janette Husárová	7–5, 6–0
Miami Singles – Doubles	(United States) Serena Williams	(United States) Jennifer Capriati	7–5, 7–6	(United States) Lisa Raymond (Australia) Rennae Stubbs	(Spain) Virginia Ruano Pascual (Argentina) Paola Suárez	7–6^{(7–4)}, 6–7^{(4–7)}, 6–3
Charleston Singles – Doubles	(Croatia) Iva Majoli	(Switzerland) Patty Schnyder	6–3, 6–4	(United States) Lisa Raymond (Australia) Rennae Stubbs	(France) Alexandra Fusai (Netherlands) Caroline Vis	6–4, 3–6, 7–6^{(7–4)}
Berlin Singles – Doubles	(Belgium) Justine Henin*	(United States) Serena Williams	6–2, 1–6, 7–6^{(7–5)}	(Russia) Elena Dementieva* (Slovakia) Janette Husárová*	(Slovakia) Daniela Hantuchová (Spain) Arantxa Sánchez Vicario	0–6, 7–6^{(7–3)}, 6–2
Rome Singles – Doubles	(United States) Serena Williams	(Belgium) Justine Henin	7–6, 6–4	(Spain) Virginia Ruano Pascual (Argentina) Paola Suárez	(Spain) Conchita Martínez (Argentina) Patricia Tarabini	6–3, 6–4
Montréal Singles – Doubles	(France) Amélie Mauresmo	(United States) Jennifer Capriati	6–4, 6–1	(Spain) Virginia Ruano Pascual (Argentina) Paola Suárez	(Japan) Rika Fujiwara (Japan) Ai Sugiyama	6–4, 7–6^{(7–4)}
Moscow Singles – Doubles	(Bulgaria) Magdalena Maleeva	(United States) Lindsay Davenport	5–7, 6–3, 7–6^{(7–4)}	(Russia) Elena Dementieva (Slovakia) Janette Husárová	(Federal Republic of Yugoslavia) Jelena Dokić (Russia) Nadia Petrova	2–6, 6–3, 7–6^{(9–7)}
Zürich Singles – Doubles	(Switzerland) Patty Schnyder*	(United States) Lindsay Davenport	6–7^{(5–7)}, 7–6^{(10–8)}, 6–3	(Russia) Elena Bovina* (Belgium) Justine Henin*	(Federal Republic of Yugoslavia) Jelena Dokić (Russia) Nadia Petrova	6–2, 7–6^{(7–2)}

=== 2003 ===
Tournament	Singles champions	Runners-up	Score	Doubles champions	Runners-up	Score
Tokyo Singles – Doubles	(United States) Lindsay Davenport	(United States) Monica Seles	6–7^{(6–8)}, 6–1, 6–2	(Russia) Elena Bovina (Australia) Rennae Stubbs	(United States) Lindsay Davenport (United States) Lisa Raymond	6–3, 6–4
Indian Wells Singles – Doubles	(Belgium) Kim Clijsters*	(United States) Lindsay Davenport	6–4, 7–5	(United States) Lindsay Davenport (United States) Lisa Raymond	(Belgium) Kim Clijsters (Japan) Ai Sugiyama	2–6, 6–2, 7–6^{(7–5)}
Miami Singles – Doubles	(United States) Serena Williams	(United States) Jennifer Capriati	4–6, 6–4, 6–1	(South Africa) Liezel Huber* (Bulgaria) Magdalena Maleeva*	(Japan) Shinobu Asagoe (Japan) Nana Miyagi	6–4, 3–6, 7–5
Charleston Singles – Doubles	(Belgium) Justine Henin	(United States) Serena Williams	7–6^{(7–5)}, 6–4	(Spain) Virginia Ruano Pascual (Argentina) Paola Suárez	(Slovakia) Janette Husárová (Spain) Conchita Martínez	6–0, 6–3
Berlin Singles – Doubles	(Belgium) Justine Henin (2)	(Belgium) Kim Clijsters	6–4, 4–6, 7–5	(Spain) Virginia Ruano Pascual (2) (Argentina) Paola Suárez (2)	(Belgium) Kim Clijsters (Japan) Ai Sugiyama	6–3, 4–6, 6–4
Rome Singles – Doubles	(Belgium) Kim Clijsters (2)	(France) Amélie Mauresmo	3–6, 7–6^{(7–3)}, 6–0	(Russia) Svetlana Kuznetsova*	(Federal Republic of Yugoslavia) Jelena Dokić (Russia) Nadia Petrova	6–4, 5–7, 6–2
Rome Singles – Doubles	(Belgium) Kim Clijsters (2)	(France) Amélie Mauresmo	3–6, 7–6^{(7–3)}, 6–0	(United States) Martina Navratilova	(Federal Republic of Yugoslavia) Jelena Dokić (Russia) Nadia Petrova	6–4, 5–7, 6–2
Toronto Singles – Doubles	(Belgium) Justine Henin (3)	(Russia) Lina Krasnoroutskaya	6–1, 6–0	(Russia) Svetlana Kuznetsova (2) (United States) Martina Navratilova (2)	(Venezuela) María Vento-Kabchi (Indonesia) Angelique Widjaja	3–6, 6–1, 6–1
Moscow Singles – Doubles	(Russia) Anastasia Myskina*	(France) Amélie Mauresmo	6–2, 6–4	(Russia) Nadia Petrova*	(Russia) Anastasia Myskina (Russia) Vera Zvonareva	6–3, 6–4
Moscow Singles – Doubles	(Russia) Anastasia Myskina*	(France) Amélie Mauresmo	6–2, 6–4	(United States) Meghann Shaughnessy	(Russia) Anastasia Myskina (Russia) Vera Zvonareva	6–3, 6–4
Zürich Singles – Doubles	(Belgium) Justine Henin (4)	(Serbia and Montenegro) Jelena Dokić	6–0, 6–4	(Belgium) Kim Clijsters*	(Spain) Virginia Ruano Pascual (Argentina) Paola Suárez	7–6^{(7–3)}, 6–2
Zürich Singles – Doubles	(Belgium) Justine Henin (4)	(Serbia and Montenegro) Jelena Dokić	6–0, 6–4	(Japan) Ai Sugiyama	(Spain) Virginia Ruano Pascual (Argentina) Paola Suárez	7–6^{(7–3)}, 6–2

=== 2004 ===
Tournament	Singles champions	Runners-up	Score	Doubles champions	Runners-up	Score
Tokyo Singles – Doubles	(United States) Lindsay Davenport	(Bulgaria) Magdalena Maleeva	6–4, 6–1	(Zimbabwe) Cara Black (Australia) Rennae Stubbs	(Russia) Elena Likhovtseva (Bulgaria) Magdalena Maleeva	6–0, 6–1
Indian Wells Singles – Doubles	(Belgium) Justine Henin	(United States) Lindsay Davenport	6–1, 6–4	(Spain) Virginia Ruano Pascual (Argentina) Paola Suárez	(Russia) Svetlana Kuznetsova (Russia) Elena Likhovtseva	6–1, 6–2
Miami Singles – Doubles	(United States) Serena Williams	(Russia) Elena Dementieva	6–1, 6–1	(Russia) Nadia Petrova (United States) Meghann Shaughnessy	(Russia) Svetlana Kuznetsova (Russia) Elena Likhovtseva	6–2, 6–3
Charleston Singles – Doubles	(United States) Venus Williams	(Spain) Conchita Martínez	2–6, 6–2, 6–1	(Spain) Virginia Ruano Pascual (2) (Argentina) Paola Suárez (2)	(United States) Martina Navratilova (United States) Lisa Raymond	6–4, 6–1
Berlin Singles – Doubles	(France) Amélie Mauresmo	(United States) Venus Williams	Walkover	(Russia) Nadia Petrova (2) (United States) Meghann Shaughnessy (2)	(Slovakia) Janette Husárová (Spain) Conchita Martínez	6–2, 2–6, 6–1
Rome Singles – Doubles	(France) Amélie Mauresmo (2)	(United States) Jennifer Capriati	3–6, 6–3, 7–6^{(8–6)}	(Russia) Nadia Petrova (3) (United States) Meghann Shaughnessy (3)	(Spain) Virginia Ruano Pascual (Argentina) Paola Suárez	2–6, 6–3, 6–3
San Diego Singles – Doubles	(United States) Lindsay Davenport (2)	(Russia) Anastasia Myskina	6–1, 6–1	(Zimbabwe) Cara Black (2) (Australia) Rennae Stubbs (2)	(Spain) Virginia Ruano Pascual (Argentina) Paola Suárez	4–6, 6–1, 6–4
Montréal Singles – Doubles	(France) Amélie Mauresmo (3)	(Russia) Elena Likhovtseva	6–1, 6–0	(Japan) Shinobu Asagoe*	(South Africa) Liezel Huber (Thailand) Tamarine Tanasugarn	6–0, 6–3
Montréal Singles – Doubles	(France) Amélie Mauresmo (3)	(Russia) Elena Likhovtseva	6–1, 6–0	(Japan) Ai Sugiyama	(South Africa) Liezel Huber (Thailand) Tamarine Tanasugarn	6–0, 6–3
Moscow Singles – Doubles	(Russia) Anastasia Myskina	(Russia) Elena Dementieva	7–5, 6–0	(Russia) Anastasia Myskina* (Russia) Vera Zvonareva*	(Spain) Virginia Ruano Pascual (Argentina) Paola Suárez	6–3, 4–6, 6–2
Zürich Singles – Doubles	(Australia) Alicia Molik*	(Russia) Maria Sharapova	4–6, 6–2, 6–3	(Zimbabwe) Cara Black (3) (Australia) Rennae Stubbs (3)	(Spain) Virginia Ruano Pascual (Argentina) Paola Suárez	6–4, 6–4

=== 2005 ===
Tournament	Singles champions	Runners-up	Score	Doubles champions	Runners-up	Score
Tokyo Singles – Doubles	(Russia) Maria Sharapova*	(United States) Lindsay Davenport	6–1, 3–6, 7–6^{(7–5)}	(Slovakia) Janette Husárová (Russia) Elena Likhovtseva	(United States) Lindsay Davenport (United States) Corina Morariu	6–4, 6–3
Indian Wells Singles – Doubles	(Belgium) Kim Clijsters	(United States) Lindsay Davenport	6–4, 4–6, 6–2	(Spain) Virginia Ruano Pascual (Argentina) Paola Suárez	(Russia) Nadia Petrova (United States) Meghann Shaughnessy	7–6^{(7–3)}, 6–1
Miami Singles – Doubles	(Belgium) Kim Clijsters (2)	(Russia) Maria Sharapova	7–5, 6–3	(Russia) Svetlana Kuznetsova	(United States) Lisa Raymond (Australia) Rennae Stubbs	7–5, 6–7^{(5–7)}, 6–2
Miami Singles – Doubles	(Belgium) Kim Clijsters (2)	(Russia) Maria Sharapova	7–5, 6–3	(Australia) Alicia Molik*	(United States) Lisa Raymond (Australia) Rennae Stubbs	7–5, 6–7^{(5–7)}, 6–2
Charleston Singles – Doubles	(Belgium) Justine Henin	(Russia) Elena Dementieva	7–5, 6–4	(Spain) Conchita Martínez (Spain) Virginia Ruano Pascual (2)	(Czech Republic) Iveta Benešová (Czech Republic) Květa Peschke	6–1, 6–4
Berlin Singles – Doubles	(Belgium) Justine Henin (2)	(Russia) Nadia Petrova	6–3, 4–6, 6–3	(Russia) Elena Likhovtseva (2) (Russia) Vera Zvonareva	(Zimbabwe) Cara Black (South Africa) Liezel Huber	4–6, 6–4, 6–3
Rome Singles – Doubles	(France) Amélie Mauresmo	(Switzerland) Patty Schnyder	2–6, 6–3, 6–4	(Zimbabwe) Cara Black (South Africa) Liezel Huber	(Russia) Maria Kirilenko (Spain) Anabel Medina Garrigues	6–0, 4–6, 6–1
San Diego Singles – Doubles	(France) Mary Pierce	(Japan) Ai Sugiyama	6–3, 6–0	(Spain) Conchita Martínez (2) (Spain) Virginia Ruano Pascual (3)	(Slovakia) Daniela Hantuchová (Japan) Ai Sugiyama	6–7^{(7–9)}, 6–1, 7–5
Toronto Singles – Doubles	(Belgium) Kim Clijsters (3)	(Belgium) Justine Henin	7–5, 6–1	(Germany) Anna-Lena Grönefeld*	(Spain) Conchita Martínez (Spain) Virginia Ruano Pascual	5–7, 6–3, 6–4
Toronto Singles – Doubles	(Belgium) Kim Clijsters (3)	(Belgium) Justine Henin	7–5, 6–1	(United States) Martina Navratilova	(Spain) Conchita Martínez (Spain) Virginia Ruano Pascual	5–7, 6–3, 6–4
Moscow Singles – Doubles	(France) Mary Pierce (2)	(Italy) Francesca Schiavone	6–4, 6–3	(United States) Lisa Raymond	(Zimbabwe) Cara Black (Australia) Rennae Stubbs	6–2, 6–4
Moscow Singles – Doubles	(France) Mary Pierce (2)	(Italy) Francesca Schiavone	6–4, 6–3	(Australia) Samantha Stosur*	(Zimbabwe) Cara Black (Australia) Rennae Stubbs	6–2, 6–4
Zürich Singles – Doubles	(United States) Lindsay Davenport	(Switzerland) Patty Schnyder	7–6, 6–3	(Zimbabwe) Cara Black (2) (Australia) Rennae Stubbs	(Slovakia) Daniela Hantuchová (Japan) Ai Sugiyama	6–7^{(6–8)}, 7–6^{(7–4)}, 6–3

=== 2006 ===
Tournament	Singles champions	Runners-up	Score	Doubles champions	Runners-up	Score
Tokyo Singles – Doubles	(Russia) Elena Dementieva*	(Switzerland) Martina Hingis	6–2, 6–0	(United States) Lisa Raymond (Australia) Samantha Stosur	(Zimbabwe) Cara Black (Australia) Rennae Stubbs	6–2, 6–1
Indian Wells Singles – Doubles	(Russia) Maria Sharapova	(Russia) Elena Dementieva	6–1, 6–2	(United States) Lisa Raymond (2) (Australia) Samantha Stosur (2)	(Spain) Virginia Ruano Pascual (United States) Meghann Shaughnessy	6–2, 7–5
Miami Singles – Doubles	(Russia) Svetlana Kuznetsova*	(Russia) Maria Sharapova	6–4, 6–3	(United States) Lisa Raymond (3) (Australia) Samantha Stosur (3)	(South Africa) Liezel Huber (United States) Martina Navratilova	6–4, 7–5
Charleston Singles – Doubles	(Russia) Nadia Petrova*	(Switzerland) Patty Schnyder	6–3, 4–6, 6–1	(United States) Lisa Raymond (4) (Australia) Samantha Stosur (4)	(Spain) Virginia Ruano Pascual (United States) Meghann Shaughnessy	3–6, 6–1, 6–1
Berlin Singles – Doubles	(Russia) Nadia Petrova (2)	(Belgium) Justine Henin	4–6, 6–4, 7–5	(China) Yan Zi* (China) Zheng Jie*	(Russia) Elena Dementieva (Italy) Flavia Pennetta	6–2, 6–3
Rome Singles – Doubles	(Switzerland) Martina Hingis	(Russia) Dinara Safina	6–2, 7–5	(Slovakia) Daniela Hantuchová*	(Czech Republic) Květa Peschke (Italy) Francesca Schiavone	3–6, 6–3, 6–1
Rome Singles – Doubles	(Switzerland) Martina Hingis	(Russia) Dinara Safina	6–2, 7–5	(Japan) Ai Sugiyama	(Czech Republic) Květa Peschke (Italy) Francesca Schiavone	3–6, 6–3, 6–1
San Diego Singles – Doubles	(Russia) Maria Sharapova (2)	(Belgium) Kim Clijsters	7–5, 7–5	(Zimbabwe) Cara Black (Australia) Rennae Stubbs	(Germany) Anna-Lena Grönefeld (United States) Meghann Shaughnessy	6–2, 6–2
Montréal Singles – Doubles	(Serbia) Ana Ivanovic*	(Switzerland) Martina Hingis	6–2, 6–3	(United States) Martina Navratilova (Russia) Nadia Petrova	(Zimbabwe) Cara Black (Germany) Anna-Lena Grönefeld	6–1, 6–2
Moscow Singles – Doubles	(Russia) Anna Chakvetadze*	(Russia) Nadia Petrova	6–4, 6–4	(Czech Republic) Květa Peschke* (Italy) Francesca Schiavone*	(Czech Republic) Iveta Benešová (Russia) Galina Voskoboeva	6–4, 6–7^{(4–7)}, 6–1
Zürich Singles – Doubles	(Russia) Maria Sharapova (3)	(Slovakia) Daniela Hantuchová	6–1, 4–6, 6–3	(Zimbabwe) Cara Black (2) (Australia) Rennae Stubbs (2)	(South Africa) Liezel Huber (Slovenia) Katarina Srebotnik	7–5, 7–5

=== 2007 ===
Tournament	Singles champions	Runners-up	Score	Doubles champions	Runners-up	Score
Tokyo Singles – Doubles	(Switzerland) Martina Hingis	(Serbia) Ana Ivanovic	6–4, 6–2	(United States) Lisa Raymond (Australia) Samantha Stosur	(United States) Vania King (Australia) Rennae Stubbs	7–6^{(8–6)}, 3–6, 7–5
Indian Wells Singles – Doubles	(Slovakia) Daniela Hantuchová	(Russia) Svetlana Kuznetsova	6–3, 6–4	(United States) Lisa Raymond (2) (Australia) Samantha Stosur (2)	(Chinese Taipei) Chan Latisha (Chinese Taipei) Chuang Chia-jung	6–3, 7–5
Miami Singles – Doubles	(United States) Serena Williams	(Belgium) Justine Henin	0–6, 7–5, 6–3	(United States) Lisa Raymond (3) (Australia) Samantha Stosur (3)	(Zimbabwe) Cara Black (South Africa) Liezel Huber	6–4, 3–6, [10–2]
Charleston Singles – Doubles	(Serbia) Jelena Janković*	(Russia) Dinara Safina	6–2, 6–2	(China) Yan Zi (China) Zheng Jie	(China) Peng Shuai (China) Sun Tiantian	7–5, 6–0
Berlin Singles – Doubles	(Serbia) Ana Ivanovic	(Russia) Svetlana Kuznetsova	3–6, 6–4, 7–6^{(7–4)}	(United States) Lisa Raymond (4) (Australia) Samantha Stosur (4)	(Italy) Tathiana Garbin (Italy) Roberta Vinci	6–3, 6–4
Rome Singles – Doubles	(Serbia) Jelena Janković (2)	(Russia) Svetlana Kuznetsova	7–5, 6–1	(France) Nathalie Dechy* (Italy) Mara Santangelo*	(Italy) Tathiana Garbin (Italy) Roberta Vinci	6–4, 6–1
San Diego Singles – Doubles	(Russia) Maria Sharapova	(Switzerland) Patty Schnyder	6–2, 3–6, 6–0	(Zimbabwe) Cara Black (United States) Liezel Huber	(Belarus) Victoria Azarenka (Russia) Anna Chakvetadze	7–5, 6–4
Toronto Singles – Doubles	(Belgium) Justine Henin	(Serbia) Jelena Janković	7–6^{(7–3)}, 7–5	(Slovenia) Katarina Srebotnik*	(Zimbabwe) Cara Black (United States) Liezel Huber	6–4, 2–6, [10–5]
Toronto Singles – Doubles	(Belgium) Justine Henin	(Serbia) Jelena Janković	7–6^{(7–3)}, 7–5	(Japan) Ai Sugiyama	(Zimbabwe) Cara Black (United States) Liezel Huber	6–4, 2–6, [10–5]
Moscow Singles – Doubles	(Russia) Elena Dementieva	(United States) Serena Williams	5–7, 6–1, 6–1	(Zimbabwe) Cara Black (2) (United States) Liezel Huber (2)	(Belarus) Victoria Azarenka (Belarus) Tatiana Poutchek	4–6, 6–1, [10–7]
Zürich Singles – Doubles	(Belgium) Justine Henin (2)	(France) Tatiana Golovin	6–4, 6–4	(Czech Republic) Květa Peschke (Australia) Rennae Stubbs	(United States) Lisa Raymond (Italy) Francesca Schiavone	7–5, 7–6^{(7–1)}

=== 2008 ===
Tournament	Singles champions	Runners-up	Score	Doubles champions	Runners-up	Score
Doha Singles – Doubles	(Russia) Maria Sharapova	(Russia) Vera Zvonareva	6–1, 2–6, 6–0	(Czech Republic) Květa Peschke (Australia) Rennae Stubbs	(Zimbabwe) Cara Black (United States) Liezel Huber	6–1, 5–7, [10–7]
Indian Wells Singles – Doubles	(Serbia) Ana Ivanovic	(Russia) Svetlana Kuznetsova	6–4, 6–3	(Russia) Dinara Safina* (Russia) Elena Vesnina*	(China) Yan Zi (China) Zheng Jie	6–1, 1–6, [10–8]
Miami Singles – Doubles	(United States) Serena Williams	(Serbia) Jelena Janković	6–1, 5–7, 6–3	(Slovenia) Katarina Srebotnik (Japan) Ai Sugiyama	(Zimbabwe) Cara Black (United States) Liezel Huber	7–5, 4–6, [10–3]
Charleston Singles – Doubles	(United States) Serena Williams (2)	(Russia) Vera Zvonareva	6–4, 3–6, 6–3	(Slovenia) Katarina Srebotnik (2) (Japan) Ai Sugiyama (2)	(Romania) Edina Gallovits (Belarus) Olga Govortsova	6–2, 6–2
Berlin Singles – Doubles	(Russia) Dinara Safina*	(Russia) Elena Dementieva	3–6, 6–2, 6–2	(Zimbabwe) Cara Black (United States) Liezel Huber	(Spain) Nuria Llagostera Vives (Spain) María José Martínez Sánchez	3–6, 6–2, [10–2]
Rome Singles – Doubles	(Serbia) Jelena Janković	(France) Alizé Cornet	6–2, 6–2	(Chinese Taipei) Chan Latisha* (Chinese Taipei) Chuang Chia-jung*	(Czech Republic) Iveta Benešová (Slovakia) Janette Husárová	7–6^{(7–5)}, 6–3
Montréal Singles – Doubles	(Russia) Dinara Safina (2)	(Slovakia) Dominika Cibulková	6–2, 6–1	(Zimbabwe) Cara Black (2) (United States) Liezel Huber (2)	(Russia) Maria Kirilenko (Italy) Flavia Pennetta	6–1, 6–1
Tokyo Singles – Doubles	(Russia) Dinara Safina (3)	(Russia) Svetlana Kuznetsova	6–1, 6–3	(United States) Vania King*	(United States) Lisa Raymond (Australia) Samantha Stosur	6–1, 6–4
Tokyo Singles – Doubles	(Russia) Dinara Safina (3)	(Russia) Svetlana Kuznetsova	6–1, 6–3	(Russia) Nadia Petrova	(United States) Lisa Raymond (Australia) Samantha Stosur	6–1, 6–4
Moscow Singles – Doubles	(Serbia) Jelena Janković (2)	(Russia) Vera Zvonareva	6–2, 6–4	(Russia) Nadia Petrova (2) (Slovenia) Katarina Srebotnik (3)	(Zimbabwe) Cara Black (United States) Liezel Huber	6–4, 6–4

=== 2009 ===
Tournament	Singles champions	Runners-up	Score	Doubles champions	Runners-up	Score
Dubai Singles – Doubles	(United States) Venus Williams	(France) Virginie Razzano	6–4, 6–2	(Zimbabwe) Cara Black (United States) Liezel Huber	(Russia) Maria Kirilenko (Poland) Agnieszka Radwańska	6–3, 6–3
Indian Wells Singles – Doubles	(Russia) Vera Zvonareva*	(Serbia) Ana Ivanovic	7–6^{(7–5)}, 6–2	(Belarus) Victoria Azarenka*	(Argentina) Gisela Dulko (Israel) Shahar Pe'er	6–4, 3–6, [10–5]
Indian Wells Singles – Doubles	(Russia) Vera Zvonareva*	(Serbia) Ana Ivanovic	7–6^{(7–5)}, 6–2	(Russia) Vera Zvonareva	(Argentina) Gisela Dulko (Israel) Shahar Pe'er	6–4, 3–6, [10–5]
Miami Singles – Doubles	(Belarus) Victoria Azarenka*	(United States) Serena Williams	6–3, 6–1	(Russia) Svetlana Kuznetsova	(Czech Republic) Květa Peschke (United States) Lisa Raymond	4–6, 6–1, [10–3]
Miami Singles – Doubles	(Belarus) Victoria Azarenka*	(United States) Serena Williams	6–3, 6–1	(France) Amélie Mauresmo*	(Czech Republic) Květa Peschke (United States) Lisa Raymond	4–6, 6–1, [10–3]
Rome Singles – Doubles	(Russia) Dinara Safina	(Russia) Svetlana Kuznetsova	6–3, 6–2	(Chinese Taipei) Hsieh Su-wei* (China) Peng Shuai*	(Slovakia) Daniela Hantuchová (Japan) Ai Sugiyama	7–5, 7–6^{(7–5)}
Madrid Singles – Doubles	(Russia) Dinara Safina (2)	(Denmark) Caroline Wozniacki	6–2, 6–4	(Zimbabwe) Cara Black (2) (United States) Liezel Huber (2)	(Czech Republic) Květa Peschke (United States) Lisa Raymond	4–6, 6–3, [10–6]
Cincinnati Singles – Doubles	(Serbia) Jelena Janković	(Russia) Dinara Safina	6–4, 6–2	(Zimbabwe) Cara Black (3) (United States) Liezel Huber (3)	(Spain) Nuria Llagostera Vives (Spain) María José Martínez Sánchez	6–3, 0–6, [10–2]
Toronto Singles – Doubles	(Russia) Elena Dementieva	(Russia) Maria Sharapova	6–4, 6–3	(Spain) Nuria Llagostera Vives* (Spain) María José Martínez Sánchez*	(Australia) Samantha Stosur (Australia) Rennae Stubbs	2–6, 7–5, [11–9]
Tokyo Singles – Doubles	(Russia) Maria Sharapova	(Serbia) Jelena Janković	5–2, ret.	(Russia) Alisa Kleybanova*	(Slovakia) Daniela Hantuchová (Japan) Ai Sugiyama	6–4, 6–2
Tokyo Singles – Doubles	(Russia) Maria Sharapova	(Serbia) Jelena Janković	5–2, ret.	(Italy) Francesca Schiavone	(Slovakia) Daniela Hantuchová (Japan) Ai Sugiyama	6–4, 6–2
Beijing Singles – Doubles	(Russia) Svetlana Kuznetsova	(Poland) Agnieszka Radwańska	6–2, 6–4	(Chinese Taipei) Hsieh Su-wei (2) (China) Peng Shuai (2)	(Russia) Alla Kudryavtseva (Russia) Ekaterina Makarova	6–3, 6–1

=== 2010 ===
Tournament	Singles champions	Runners-up	Score	Doubles champions	Runners-up	Score
Dubai Singles – Doubles	(United States) Venus Williams	(Belarus) Victoria Azarenka	6–3, 7–5	(Spain) Nuria Llagostera Vives (Spain) María José Martínez Sánchez	(Czech Republic) Květa Peschke (Slovakia) Katarina Srebotnik	7–6^{(7–5)}, 6–4
Indian Wells Singles – Doubles	(Serbia) Jelena Janković	(Denmark) Caroline Wozniacki	6–2, 6–4	(Czech Republic) Květa Peschke (Slovakia) Katarina Srebotnik	(Russia) Nadia Petrova (Australia) Samantha Stosur	6–4, 2–6, [10–5]
Miami Singles – Doubles	(Belgium) Kim Clijsters	(United States) Venus Williams	6–2, 6–1	(Argentina) Gisela Dulko* (Italy) Flavia Pennetta*	(Russia) Nadia Petrova (Australia) Samantha Stosur	6–3, 4–6, [10–7]
Rome Singles – Doubles	(Spain) María José Martínez Sánchez*	(Serbia) Jelena Janković	7–6^{7–5}, 7–5	(Argentina) Gisela Dulko (2) (Italy) Flavia Pennetta (2)	(Spain) María José Martínez Sánchez (Spain) Nuria Llagostera Vives	6–4, 6–2
Madrid Singles – Doubles	(France) Aravane Rezaï*	(United States) Venus Williams	6–2, 7–5	(United States) Serena Williams (United States) Venus Williams	(Argentina) Gisela Dulko (Italy) Flavia Pennetta	6–2, 7–5
Cincinnati Singles – Doubles	(Belgium) Kim Clijsters (2)	(Russia) Maria Sharapova	2–6, 7–6^{(7–4)}, 6–2	(Belarus) Victoria Azarenka	(United States) Lisa Raymond (Australia) Rennae Stubbs	7–6^{(7–4)}, 7–6^{(10–8)}
Cincinnati Singles – Doubles	(Belgium) Kim Clijsters (2)	(Russia) Maria Sharapova	2–6, 7–6^{(7–4)}, 6–2	(Russia) Maria Kirilenko*	(United States) Lisa Raymond (Australia) Rennae Stubbs	7–6^{(7–4)}, 7–6^{(10–8)}
Montréal Singles – Doubles	(Denmark) Caroline Wozniacki*	(Russia) Vera Zvonareva	6–3, 6–2	(Argentina) Gisela Dulko (3) (Italy) Flavia Pennetta (3)	(Czech Republic) Květa Peschke (Slovenia) Katarina Srebotnik	7–5, 3–6, [12–10]
Tokyo Singles – Doubles	(Denmark) Caroline Wozniacki (2)	(Russia) Elena Dementieva	1–6, 6–2, 6–3	(Czech Republic) Iveta Benešová* (Czech Republic) Barbora Strýcová*	(Israel) Shahar Pe'er (China) Peng Shuai	6–4, 4–6, [10-8]
Beijing Singles – Doubles	(Denmark) Caroline Wozniacki (3)	(Russia) Vera Zvonareva	6–3, 3–6, 6–3	(Chinese Taipei) Chuang Chia-jung	(Argentina) Gisela Dulko (Italy) Flavia Pennetta	7–6^{(7–2)}, 1–6, [10–7]
Beijing Singles – Doubles	(Denmark) Caroline Wozniacki (3)	(Russia) Vera Zvonareva	6–3, 3–6, 6–3	(Belarus) Olga Govortsova*	(Argentina) Gisela Dulko (Italy) Flavia Pennetta	7–6^{(7–2)}, 1–6, [10–7]

=== 2011 ===
Tournament	Singles champions	Runners-up	Score	Doubles champions	Runners-up	Score
Dubai Singles – Doubles	(Denmark) Caroline Wozniacki	(Russia) Svetlana Kuznetsova	6–1, 6–3	(United States) Liezel Huber (Spain) María José Martínez Sánchez	(Czech Republic) Květa Peschke (Slovenia) Katarina Srebotnik	7–6^{(7–5)}, 6–3
Indian Wells Singles – Doubles	(Denmark) Caroline Wozniacki (2)	(France) Marion Bartoli	6–1, 2–6, 6–3	(India) Sania Mirza*	(United States) Bethanie Mattek-Sands (United States) Meghann Shaughnessy	6–0, 7–5
Indian Wells Singles – Doubles	(Denmark) Caroline Wozniacki (2)	(France) Marion Bartoli	6–1, 2–6, 6–3	(Russia) Elena Vesnina	(United States) Bethanie Mattek-Sands (United States) Meghann Shaughnessy	6–0, 7–5
Miami Singles – Doubles	(Belarus) Victoria Azarenka	(Russia) Maria Sharapova	6–1, 6–4	(Slovakia) Daniela Hantuchová	(United States) Liezel Huber (Russia) Nadia Petrova	7–6^{(7–5)}, 2–6, [10–8]
Miami Singles – Doubles	(Belarus) Victoria Azarenka	(Russia) Maria Sharapova	6–1, 6–4	(Poland) Agnieszka Radwańska*	(United States) Liezel Huber (Russia) Nadia Petrova	7–6^{(7–5)}, 2–6, [10–8]
Madrid Singles – Doubles	(Czech Republic) Petra Kvitová*	(Belarus) Victoria Azarenka	7–6^{(7–3)}, 6–4	(Belarus) Victoria Azarenka (Russia) Maria Kirilenko	(Czech Republic) Květa Peschke (Slovenia) Katarina Srebotnik	6–4, 6–3
Rome Singles – Doubles	(Russia) Maria Sharapova	(Australia) Samantha Stosur	6–2, 6–4	(China) Peng Shuai (China) Zheng Jie	(United States) Vania King (Kazakhstan) Yaroslava Shvedova	6–2, 6–3
Toronto Singles – Doubles	(United States) Serena Williams	(Australia) Samantha Stosur	6–4, 6–2	(United States) Liezel Huber (2) (United States) Lisa Raymond	(Belarus) Victoria Azarenka (Russia) Maria Kirilenko	Walkover
Cincinnati Singles – Doubles	(Russia) Maria Sharapova (2)	(Serbia) Jelena Janković	4–6, 7–6^{(7–3)}, 6–3	(United States) Vania King	(South Africa) Natalie Grandin (Czech Republic) Vladimíra Uhlířová	6–4, 3–6, [11–9]
Cincinnati Singles – Doubles	(Russia) Maria Sharapova (2)	(Serbia) Jelena Janković	4–6, 7–6^{(7–3)}, 6–3	(Kazakhstan) Yaroslava Shvedova*	(South Africa) Natalie Grandin (Czech Republic) Vladimíra Uhlířová	6–4, 3–6, [11–9]
Tokyo Singles – Doubles	(Poland) Agnieszka Radwańska*	(Russia) Vera Zvonareva	6–3, 6–2	(United States) Liezel Huber (3) (United States) Lisa Raymond (2)	(Argentina) Gisela Dulko (Italy) Flavia Pennetta	7–6^{(7–4)}, 0–6, [10–6]
Beijing Singles – Doubles	(Poland) Agnieszka Radwańska (2)	(Germany) Andrea Petkovic	7–5, 0–6, 6–4	(Czech Republic) Květa Peschke (Slovenia) Katarina Srebotnik	(Argentina) Gisela Dulko (Italy) Flavia Pennetta	6–3, 6–4

=== 2012 ===
Tournament	Singles champions	Runners-up	Score	Doubles champions	Runners-up	Score
Doha Singles – Doubles	(Belarus) Victoria Azarenka	(Australia) Samantha Stosur	6–1, 6–2	(United States) Liezel Huber (United States) Lisa Raymond	(United States) Raquel Kops-Jones (United States) Abigail Spears	6–3, 6–1
Indian Wells Singles – Doubles	(Belarus) Victoria Azarenka (2)	(Russia) Maria Sharapova	6–2, 6–3	(United States) Liezel Huber (2) (United States) Lisa Raymond (2)	(India) Sania Mirza (Russia) Elena Vesnina	6–2, 6–3
Miami Singles – Doubles	(Poland) Agnieszka Radwańska	(Russia) Maria Sharapova	7–5, 6–4	(Russia) Maria Kirilenko (Russia) Nadia Petrova	(Italy) Sara Errani (Italy) Roberta Vinci	7–6^{(7–0)}, 4–6, [10–4]
Madrid Singles – Doubles	(United States) Serena Williams	(Belarus) Victoria Azarenka	6–1, 6–3	(Italy) Sara Errani* (Italy) Roberta Vinci*	(Russia) Ekaterina Makarova (Russia) Elena Vesnina	6–1, 3–6, [10–4]
Rome Singles – Doubles	(Russia) Maria Sharapova	(China) Li Na	4–6, 6–4, 7–6^{(7–5)}	(Italy) Sara Errani (2) (Italy) Roberta Vinci (2)	(Russia) Ekaterina Makarova (Russia) Elena Vesnina	6–2, 7–5
Montréal Singles – Doubles	(Czech Republic) Petra Kvitová	(China) Li Na	7–5, 2–6, 6–3	(Poland) Klaudia Jans-Ignacik* (France) Kristina Mladenovic*	(Russia) Nadia Petrova (Slovenia) Katarina Srebotnik	7–5, 2–6, 6–3
Cincinnati Singles – Doubles	(China) Li Na*	(Germany) Angelique Kerber	1–6, 6–3, 6–1	(Czech Republic) Andrea Hlaváčková* (Czech Republic) Lucie Hradecká*	(Slovenia) Katarina Srebotnik (China) Zheng Jie	6–1, 6–3
Tokyo Singles – Doubles	(Russia) Nadia Petrova	(Poland) Agnieszka Radwańska	6–0, 1–6, 6–3	(United States) Raquel Kops-Jones* (United States) Abigail Spears*	(Germany) Anna-Lena Grönefeld (Czech Republic) Květa Peschke	6–1, 6–4
Beijing Singles – Doubles	(Belarus) Victoria Azarenka (3)	(Russia) Maria Sharapova	6–3, 6–1	(Russia) Ekaterina Makarova*	(Spain) Nuria Llagostera Vives (India) Sania Mirza	7–5, 7–5
Beijing Singles – Doubles	(Belarus) Victoria Azarenka (3)	(Russia) Maria Sharapova	6–3, 6–1	(Russia) Elena Vesnina	(Spain) Nuria Llagostera Vives (India) Sania Mirza	7–5, 7–5

=== 2013 ===
Tournament	Singles champions	Runners-up	Score	Doubles champions	Runners-up	Score
Doha Singles – Doubles	(Belarus) Victoria Azarenka	(United States) Serena Williams	7–6^{(8–6)}, 2–6, 6–3	(Italy) Sara Errani (Italy) Roberta Vinci	(Russia) Nadia Petrova (Slovenia) Katarina Srebotnik	2–6, 6–3, [10–6]
Indian Wells Singles – Doubles	(Russia) Maria Sharapova	(Denmark) Caroline Wozniacki	6–2, 6–2	(Russia) Ekaterina Makarova (Russia) Elena Vesnina	(Russia) Nadia Petrova (Slovenia) Katarina Srebotnik	6–0, 5–7, [10–6]
Miami Singles – Doubles	(United States) Serena Williams	(Russia) Maria Sharapova	4–6, 6–3, 6–0	(Russia) Nadia Petrova (Slovenia) Katarina Srebotnik	(United States) Lisa Raymond (United Kingdom) Laura Robson	6–1, 7–6^{(7–2)}
Madrid Singles – Doubles	(United States) Serena Williams (2)	(Russia) Maria Sharapova	6–1, 6–4	(Russia) Anastasia Pavlyuchenkova* (Czech Republic) Lucie Šafářová*	(Zimbabwe) Cara Black (New Zealand) Marina Erakovic	6–2, 6–4
Rome Singles – Doubles	(United States) Serena Williams (3)	(Belarus) Victoria Azarenka	6–1, 6–3	(Chinese Taipei) Hsieh Su-wei (China) Peng Shuai	(Italy) Sara Errani (Italy) Roberta Vinci	4–6, 6–3, [10–8]
Toronto Singles – Doubles	(United States) Serena Williams (4)	(Romania) Sorana Cîrstea	6–2, 6–0	(Serbia) Jelena Janković*	(Germany) Anna-Lena Grönefeld (Czech Republic) Květa Peschke	5–7, 6–2, [10–6]
Toronto Singles – Doubles	(United States) Serena Williams (4)	(Romania) Sorana Cîrstea	6–2, 6–0	(Slovenia) Katarina Srebotnik (2)	(Germany) Anna-Lena Grönefeld (Czech Republic) Květa Peschke	5–7, 6–2, [10–6]
Cincinnati Singles – Doubles	(Belarus) Victoria Azarenka (2)	(United States) Serena Williams	2–6, 6–2, 7–6^{(8–6)}	(Chinese Taipei) Hsieh Su-wei (2) (China) Peng Shuai (2)	(Germany) Anna-Lena Grönefeld (Czech Republic) Květa Peschke	2–6, 6–3, [12–10]
Tokyo Singles – Doubles	(Czech Republic) Petra Kvitová	(Germany) Angelique Kerber	6–2, 0–6, 6–3	(Zimbabwe) Cara Black (India) Sania Mirza	(Chinese Taipei) Chan Hao-ching (United States) Liezel Huber	4–6, 6–0, [11–9]
Beijing Singles – Doubles	(United States) Serena Williams (5)	(Serbia) Jelena Janković	6–2, 6–2	(Zimbabwe) Cara Black (2) (India) Sania Mirza (2)	(Russia) Vera Dushevina (Spain) Arantxa Parra Santonja	6–2, 6–2

=== 2014 ===
Tournament	Singles champions	Runners-up	Score	Doubles champions	Runners-up	Score
Doha Singles – Doubles	(Romania) Simona Halep*	(Germany) Angelique Kerber	6–2, 6–3	(Chinese Taipei) Hsieh Su-wei (China) Peng Shuai	(Czech Republic) Květa Peschke (Slovenia) Katarina Srebotnik	6–4, 6–0
Indian Wells Singles – Doubles	(Italy) Flavia Pennetta*	(Poland) Agnieszka Radwańska	6–2, 6–1	(Chinese Taipei) Hsieh Su-wei (2) (China) Peng Shuai (2)	(Zimbabwe) Cara Black (India) Sania Mirza	7–6^{(7–5)}, 6–2
Miami Singles – Doubles	(United States) Serena Williams	(China) Li Na	7–5, 6–1	(Switzerland) Martina Hingis	(Russia) Ekaterina Makarova (Russia) Elena Vesnina	4–6, 6–4, [10–5]
Miami Singles – Doubles	(United States) Serena Williams	(China) Li Na	7–5, 6–1	(Germany) Sabine Lisicki*	(Russia) Ekaterina Makarova (Russia) Elena Vesnina	4–6, 6–4, [10–5]
Madrid Singles – Doubles	(Russia) Maria Sharapova	(Romania) Simona Halep	1–6, 6–2, 6–3	(Italy) Sara Errani (Italy) Roberta Vinci	(Spain) Garbine Muguruza (Spain) Carla Suárez Navarro	6–4, 6–4
Rome Singles – Doubles	(United States) Serena Williams (2)	(Italy) Sara Errani	6–3, 6–0	(Czech Republic) Květa Peschke (Slovenia) Katarina Srebotnik	(Italy) Sara Errani (Italy) Roberta Vinci	4–0, ret.
Montréal Singles – Doubles	(Poland) Agnieszka Radwańska	(United States) Venus Williams	6–4, 6–2	(Italy) Sara Errani (2) (Italy) Roberta Vinci (2)	(Zimbabwe) Cara Black (India) Sania Mirza	7–6^{(7–4)}, 6–3
Cincinnati Singles – Doubles	(United States) Serena Williams (3)	(Serbia) Ana Ivanovic	6–4, 6–1	(United States) Raquel Kops-Jones (United States) Abigail Spears	(Hungary) Tímea Babos (France) Kristina Mladenovic	6–1, 2–0, ret.
Wuhan Singles – Doubles	(Czech Republic) Petra Kvitová	(Canada) Eugenie Bouchard	6–3, 6–4	(Switzerland) Martina Hingis (2) (Italy) Flavia Pennetta	(Zimbabwe) Cara Black (France) Caroline Garcia	6–4, 5–7, [12–10]
Beijing Singles – Doubles	(Russia) Maria Sharapova (2)	(Czech Republic) Petra Kvitová	6–4, 2–6, 6–3	(Czech Republic) Andrea Hlaváčková (China) Peng Shuai (3)	(Zimbabwe) Cara Black (India) Sania Mirza	6–4, 6–4

=== 2015 ===
Tournament	Singles champions	Runners-up	Score	Doubles champions	Runners-up	Score
Dubai Singles – Doubles	(Romania) Simona Halep	(Czech Republic) Karolína Plíšková	6–4, 7–6^{(7–4)}	(Hungary) Tímea Babos*	(Spain) Garbiñe Muguruza (Spain) Carla Suárez Navarro	6–3, 6–2
Dubai Singles – Doubles	(Romania) Simona Halep	(Czech Republic) Karolína Plíšková	6–4, 7–6^{(7–4)}	(France) Kristina Mladenovic	(Spain) Garbiñe Muguruza (Spain) Carla Suárez Navarro	6–3, 6–2
Indian Wells Singles – Doubles	(Romania) Simona Halep (2)	(Serbia) Jelena Janković	2–6, 7–5, 6–4	(Switzerland) Martina Hingis (India) Sania Mirza	(Russia) Ekaterina Makarova (Russia) Elena Vesnina	6–3, 6–4
Miami Singles – Doubles	(United States) Serena Williams	(Spain) Carla Suárez Navarro	6–2, 6–0	(Switzerland) Martina Hingis (2) (India) Sania Mirza (2)	(Russia) Ekaterina Makarova (Russia) Elena Vesnina	7–5, 6–1
Madrid Singles – Doubles	(Czech Republic) Petra Kvitová	(Russia) Svetlana Kuznetsova	6–1, 6–2	(Australia) Casey Dellacqua*	(Spain) Garbiñe Muguruza (Spain) Carla Suárez Navarro	6–3, 6–7^{(4–7)}, [10–5]
Madrid Singles – Doubles	(Czech Republic) Petra Kvitová	(Russia) Svetlana Kuznetsova	6–1, 6–2	(Kazakhstan) Yaroslava Shvedova	(Spain) Garbiñe Muguruza (Spain) Carla Suárez Navarro	6–3, 6–7^{(4–7)}, [10–5]
Rome Singles – Doubles	(Russia) Maria Sharapova	(Spain) Carla Suárez Navarro	7–6, 7–5, 6–1	(Hungary) Tímea Babos (2) (France) Kristina Mladenovic (2)	(Switzerland) Martina Hingis (India) Sania Mirza	6–4, 6–3
Toronto Singles – Doubles	(Switzerland) Belinda Bencic*	(Romania) Simona Halep	7–6^{(7–5)}, 6–7^{(4–7)}, 3–0, ret.	(United States) Bethanie Mattek-Sands*	(France) Caroline Garcia (Slovenia) Katarina Srebotnik	6–1, 6–2
Toronto Singles – Doubles	(Switzerland) Belinda Bencic*	(Romania) Simona Halep	7–6^{(7–5)}, 6–7^{(4–7)}, 3–0, ret.	(Czech Republic) Lucie Šafářová	(France) Caroline Garcia (Slovenia) Katarina Srebotnik	6–1, 6–2
Cincinnati Singles – Doubles	(United States) Serena Williams (2)	(Romania) Simona Halep	6–3, 7–6^{(7–5)}	(Chinese Taipei) Chan Hao-ching*	(Australia) Casey Dellacqua (Kazakhstan) Yaroslava Shvedova	7–5, 6–4
Cincinnati Singles – Doubles	(United States) Serena Williams (2)	(Romania) Simona Halep	6–3, 7–6^{(7–5)}	(Chinese Taipei) Chan Latisha	(Australia) Casey Dellacqua (Kazakhstan) Yaroslava Shvedova	7–5, 6–4
Wuhan Singles – Doubles	(United States) Venus Williams	(Spain) Garbiñe Muguruza	6–3, 3–0, ret.	(Switzerland) Martina Hingis (3) (India) Sania Mirza (3)	(Romania) Irina-Camelia Begu (Romania) Monica Niculescu	6–2, 6–3
Beijing Singles – Doubles	(Spain) Garbiñe Muguruza*	(Switzerland) Timea Bacsinszky	7–5, 6–4	(Switzerland) Martina Hingis (4) (India) Sania Mirza (4)	(Chinese Taipei) Chan Hao-ching (Chinese Taipei) Chan Latisha	6–7^{(9–11)}, 6–1, [10–8]

=== 2016 ===
Tournament	Singles champions	Runners-up	Score	Doubles champions	Runners-up	Score
Doha Singles – Doubles	(Spain) Carla Suárez Navarro*	(Latvia) Jeļena Ostapenko	1–6, 6–4, 6–4	(Chinese Taipei) Chan Hao-ching (Chinese Taipei) Chan Latisha	(Italy) Sara Errani (Spain) Carla Suárez Navarro	6–3, 6–3
Indian Wells Singles – Doubles	(Belarus) Victoria Azarenka	(United States) Serena Williams	6–4, 6–4	(United States) Bethanie Mattek-Sands	(Germany) Julia Görges (Czech Republic) Karolína Plíšková	4–6, 6–4, [10–6]
Indian Wells Singles – Doubles	(Belarus) Victoria Azarenka	(United States) Serena Williams	6–4, 6–4	(United States) CoCo Vandeweghe*	(Germany) Julia Görges (Czech Republic) Karolína Plíšková	4–6, 6–4, [10–6]
Miami Singles – Doubles	(Belarus) Victoria Azarenka (2)	(Russia) Svetlana Kuznetsova	6–3, 6–2	(United States) Bethanie Mattek-Sands (2) (Czech Republic) Lucie Šafářová	(Hungary) Tímea Babos (Kazakhstan) Yaroslava Shvedova	6–3, 6–4
Madrid Singles – Doubles	(Romania) Simona Halep	(Slovakia) Dominika Cibulková	6–4, 6–2	(France) Caroline Garcia*	(Switzerland) Martina Hingis (India) Sania Mirza	6–4, 6–4
Madrid Singles – Doubles	(Romania) Simona Halep	(Slovakia) Dominika Cibulková	6–4, 6–2	(France) Kristina Mladenovic	(Switzerland) Martina Hingis (India) Sania Mirza	6–4, 6–4
Rome Singles – Doubles	(United States) Serena Williams	(United States) Madison Keys	7–6^{(7–5)}, 6–3	(Switzerland) Martina Hingis (India) Sania Mirza	(Russia) Ekaterina Makarova (Russia) Elena Vesnina	6–1, 6–7^{(5–7)}, [10–3]
Montréal Singles – Doubles	(Romania) Simona Halep (2)	(United States) Madison Keys	7–6^{(7–2)}, 6–3	(Russia) Ekaterina Makarova (Russia) Elena Vesnina	(Romania) Simona Halep (Romania) Monica Niculescu	6–3, 7–6^{(7–5)}
Cincinnati Singles – Doubles	(Czech Republic) Karolína Plíšková*	(Germany) Angelique Kerber	6–3, 6–1	(India) Sania Mirza (Czech Republic) Barbora Strýcová	(Switzerland) Martina Hingis (United States) CoCo Vandeweghe	7–5, 6–4
Wuhan Singles – Doubles	(Czech Republic) Petra Kvitová	(Slovakia) Dominika Cibulková	6–1, 6–1	(United States) Bethanie Mattek-Sands (3) (Czech Republic) Lucie Šafářová (2)	(India) Sania Mirza (Czech Republic) Barbora Strýcová	6–1, 6–4
Beijing Singles – Doubles	(Poland) Agnieszka Radwańska	(United Kingdom) Johanna Konta	6–4, 6–2	(United States) Bethanie Mattek-Sands (4) (Czech Republic) Lucie Šafářová (3)	(France) Caroline Garcia (France) Kristina Mladenovic	6–4, 6–4

=== 2017 ===
Tournament	Singles champions	Runners-up	Score	Doubles champions	Runners-up	Score
Dubai Singles – Doubles	(Ukraine) Elina Svitolina*	(Denmark) Caroline Wozniacki	6–4, 6–2	(Russia) Ekaterina Makarova (Russia) Elena Vesnina	(Czech Republic) Andrea Hlaváčková (China) Peng Shuai	6–2, 4–6, [10–7]
Indian Wells Singles – Doubles	(Russia) Elena Vesnina*	(Russia) Svetlana Kuznetsova	6–7^{(6–8)}, 7–5, 6–4	(Chinese Taipei) Latisha Chan (Switzerland) Martina Hingis	(Czech Republic) Lucie Hradecká (Czech Republic) Kateřina Siniaková	7–6^{(7–4)}, 6–2
Miami Singles – Doubles	(United Kingdom) Johanna Konta*	(Denmark) Caroline Wozniacki	6–4, 6–3	(Canada) Gabriela Dabrowski* (China) Xu Yifan*	(India) Sania Mirza (Czech Republic) Barbora Strýcová	6–4, 6–3
Madrid Singles – Doubles	(Romania) Simona Halep	(France) Kristina Mladenovic	7–5, 6–7^{(5–7)}, 6–2	(Chinese Taipei) Latisha Chan (2) (Switzerland) Martina Hingis (2)	(Hungary) Tímea Babos (Czech Republic) Andrea Hlaváčková	6–4, 6–3
Rome Singles – Doubles	(Ukraine) Elina Svitolina (2)	(Romania) Simona Halep	4–6, 7–5, 6–1	(Chinese Taipei) Latisha Chan (3) (Switzerland) Martina Hingis (3)	(Russia) Ekaterina Makarova (Russia) Elena Vesnina	7–5, 7–6^{(7–4)}
Toronto Singles – Doubles	(Ukraine) Elina Svitolina (3)	(Denmark) Caroline Wozniacki	6–4, 6–0	(Russia) Ekaterina Makarova (2) (Russia) Elena Vesnina (2)	(Germany) Anna-Lena Grönefeld (Czech Republic) Květa Peschke	6–0, 6–4
Cincinnati Singles – Doubles	(Spain) Garbiñe Muguruza	(Romania) Simona Halep	6–1, 6–0	(Chinese Taipei) Latisha Chan (4) (Switzerland) Martina Hingis (4)	(Chinese Taipei) Hsieh Su-wei (Romania) Monica Niculescu	4–6, 6–4, [10–7]
Wuhan Singles – Doubles	(France) Caroline Garcia*	(Australia) Ashleigh Barty	6–7^{(3–7)}, 7–6^{(7–4)}, 6–2	(Chinese Taipei) Latisha Chan (5) (Switzerland) Martina Hingis (5)	(Japan) Shuko Aoyama (China) Yang Zhaoxuan	7–6^{(7–5)}, 3–6, [10–4]
Beijing Singles – Doubles	(France) Caroline Garcia (2)	(Romania) Simona Halep	6–4, 7–6^{(7–3)}	(Chinese Taipei) Latisha Chan (6) (Switzerland) Martina Hingis (6)	(Hungary) Tímea Babos (Czech Republic) Andrea Hlaváčková	6–1, 6–4

=== 2018 ===
Tournament	Singles champions	Runners-up	Score	Doubles champions	Runners-up	Score
Doha Singles – Doubles	(Czech Republic) Petra Kvitová	(Spain) Garbiñe Muguruza	3–6, 6–3, 6–4	(Canada) Gabriela Dabrowski	(Slovenia) Andreja Klepač (Spain) María José Martínez Sánchez	6–3, 6–3
Doha Singles – Doubles	(Czech Republic) Petra Kvitová	(Spain) Garbiñe Muguruza	3–6, 6–3, 6–4	(Latvia) Jeļena Ostapenko*	(Slovenia) Andreja Klepač (Spain) María José Martínez Sánchez	6–3, 6–3
Indian Wells Singles – Doubles	(Japan) Naomi Osaka*	(Russia) Daria Kasatkina	6–3, 6–2	(Chinese Taipei) Hsieh Su-wei (Czech Republic) Barbora Strýcová	(Russia) Ekaterina Makarova (Russia) Elena Vesnina	6–4, 6–4
Miami Singles – Doubles	(United States) Sloane Stephens*	(Latvia) Jeļena Ostapenko	7–6^{(7–5)}, 6–1	(Australia) Ashleigh Barty*	(Czech Republic) Barbora Krejčíková (Czech Republic) Kateřina Siniaková	6–2, 6–1
Miami Singles – Doubles	(United States) Sloane Stephens*	(Latvia) Jeļena Ostapenko	7–6^{(7–5)}, 6–1	(United States) CoCo Vandeweghe	(Czech Republic) Barbora Krejčíková (Czech Republic) Kateřina Siniaková	6–2, 6–1
Madrid Singles – Doubles	(Czech Republic) Petra Kvitová (2)	(Netherlands) Kiki Bertens	7–6^{(8–6)}, 4–6, 6–3	(Russia) Ekaterina Makarova (Russia) Elena Vesnina	(Hungary) Tímea Babos (France) Kristina Mladenovic	2–6, 6–4, [10–8]
Rome Singles – Doubles	(Ukraine) Elina Svitolina	(Romania) Simona Halep	6–0, 6–4	(Australia) Ashleigh Barty (2)	(Czech Republic) Andrea Sestini Hlaváčková (Czech Republic) Barbora Strýcová	6–3, 6–4
Rome Singles – Doubles	(Ukraine) Elina Svitolina	(Romania) Simona Halep	6–0, 6–4	(Netherlands) Demi Schuurs*	(Czech Republic) Andrea Sestini Hlaváčková (Czech Republic) Barbora Strýcová	6–3, 6–4
Montréal Singles – Doubles	(Romania) Simona Halep	(United States) Sloane Stephens	7–6^{(8–6)}, 3–6, 6–4	(Australia) Ashleigh Barty (3) (Netherlands) Demi Schuurs (2)	(Chinese Taipei) Latisha Chan (Russia) Ekaterina Makarova	4–6, 6–3, [10–8]
Cincinnati Singles – Doubles	(Netherlands) Kiki Bertens*	(Romania) Simona Halep	2–6, 7–6^{(8–6)}, 6–2	(Czech Republic) Lucie Hradecká (Russia) Ekaterina Makarova (2)	(Belgium) Elise Mertens (Netherlands) Demi Schuurs	6–2, 7–5
Wuhan Singles – Doubles	(Belarus) Aryna Sabalenka*	(Estonia) Anett Kontaveit	6–3, 6–3	(Belgium) Elise Mertens*	(Czech Republic) Andrea Sestini Hlaváčková (Czech Republic) Barbora Strýcová	6–3, 6–3
Wuhan Singles – Doubles	(Belarus) Aryna Sabalenka*	(Estonia) Anett Kontaveit	6–3, 6–3	(Netherlands) Demi Schuurs (3)	(Czech Republic) Andrea Sestini Hlaváčková (Czech Republic) Barbora Strýcová	6–3, 6–3
Beijing Singles – Doubles	(Denmark) Caroline Wozniacki	(Latvia) Anastasija Sevastova	6–3, 6–3	(Czech Republic) Andrea Sestini Hlaváčková (Czech Republic) Barbora Strýcová (2)	(Canada) Gabriela Dabrowski (China) Xu Yifan	4–6, 6–4, [10–8]

=== 2019 ===
Tournament	Singles champions	Runners-up	Score	Doubles champions	Runners-up	Score
Dubai Singles – Doubles	(Switzerland) Belinda Bencic	(Czech Republic) Petra Kvitová	6–3, 1–6, 6–2	(Chinese Taipei) Hsieh Su-wei (Czech Republic) Barbora Strýcová	(Czech Republic) Lucie Hradecká (Russia) Ekaterina Makarova	6–4, 6–4
Indian Wells Singles – Doubles	(Canada) Bianca Andreescu*	(Germany) Angelique Kerber	6–4, 3–6, 6–4	(Belgium) Elise Mertens	(Czech Republic) Barbora Krejčíková (Czech Republic) Kateřina Siniaková	6–3, 6–2
Indian Wells Singles – Doubles	(Canada) Bianca Andreescu*	(Germany) Angelique Kerber	6–4, 3–6, 6–4	(Belarus) Aryna Sabalenka*	(Czech Republic) Barbora Krejčíková (Czech Republic) Kateřina Siniaková	6–3, 6–2
Miami Singles – Doubles	(Australia) Ashleigh Barty*	(Czech Republic) Karolína Plíšková	7–6^{(7–1)}, 6–3	(Belgium) Elise (2) (Belarus) Aryna Sabalenka (2)	(Australia) Samantha Stosur (China) Zhang Shuai	7–6^{(7–5)}, 6–2
Madrid Singles – Doubles	(Netherlands) Kiki Bertens	(Romania) Simona Halep	6–4, 6–4	(Chinese Taipei) Hsieh Su-wei (2) (Czech Republic) Barbora Strýcová (2)	(Canada) Gabriela Dabrowski (China) Xu Yifan	6–3, 6–1
Rome Singles – Doubles	(Czech Republic) Karolína Plíšková	(United Kingdom) Johanna Konta	6–3, 6–4	(Belarus) Victoria Azarenka (Australia) Ashleigh Barty	(Germany) Anna-Lena Grönefeld (Netherlands) Demi Schuurs	4–6, 6–0, [10–3]
Toronto Singles – Doubles	(Canada) Bianca Andreescu (2)	(United States) Serena Williams	3–1, ret.	(Czech Republic) Barbora Krejčíková* (Czech Republic) Kateřina Siniaková*	(Germany) Anna-Lena Grönefeld (Netherlands) Demi Schuurs	7–5, 6–0
Cincinnati Singles – Doubles	(United States) Madison Keys*	(Russia) Svetlana Kuznetsova	7–5, 7–6^{(7–5)}	(Czech Republic) Lucie Hradecká	(Germany) Anna-Lena Grönefeld (Netherlands) Demi Schuurs	6–4, 6–1
Cincinnati Singles – Doubles	(United States) Madison Keys*	(Russia) Svetlana Kuznetsova	7–5, 7–6^{(7–5)}	(Slovenia) Andreja Klepač*	(Germany) Anna-Lena Grönefeld (Netherlands) Demi Schuurs	6–4, 6–1
Wuhan Singles – Doubles	(Belarus) Aryna Sabalenka	(United States) Alison Riske	6–3, 3–6, 6–1	(China) Duan Yingying* (Russia) Veronika Kudermetova*	(Belgium) Elise Mertens (Belarus) Aryna Sabalenka	7–6^{(7–3)}, 6–2
Beijing Singles – Doubles	(Japan) Naomi Osaka	(Australia) Ashleigh Barty	3–6, 6–3, 6–2	(United States) Sofia Kenin*	(Latvia) Jeļena Ostapenko (Ukraine) Dayana Yastremska	6–3, 6–7^{(5–7)}, [10–7]
Beijing Singles – Doubles	(Japan) Naomi Osaka	(Australia) Ashleigh Barty	3–6, 6–3, 6–2	(United States) Bethanie Mattek-Sands	(Latvia) Jeļena Ostapenko (Ukraine) Dayana Yastremska	6–3, 6–7^{(5–7)}, [10–7]

=== 2020 ===
Tournament	Singles champions	Runners-up	Score	Doubles champions	Runners-up	Score
Indian Wells	Cancelled due to the COVID-19 pandemic.					
Miami	Cancelled due to the COVID-19 pandemic.					
Madrid	Cancelled due to the COVID-19 pandemic.					
Canada	Cancelled due to the COVID-19 pandemic.					
Wuhan	Cancelled due to the COVID-19 pandemic.					
Beijing	Cancelled due to the COVID-19 pandemic.					
Doha Singles – Doubles	(Belarus) Aryna Sabalenka	(Czech Republic) Petra Kvitová	6–3, 6–3	(Chinese Taipei) Hsieh Su-wei (Czech Republic) Barbora Strýcová	(Canada) Gabriela Dabrowski (Latvia) Jeļena Ostapenko	6–2, 5–7, [10–2]
Cincinnati Singles – Doubles	(Belarus) Victoria Azarenka	(Japan) Naomi Osaka	Walkover	(Czech Republic) Květa Peschke (Netherlands) Demi Schuurs	(United States) Nicole Melichar (China) Xu Yifan	6–1, 4–6, [10–4]
Rome Singles – Doubles	(Romania) Simona Halep	(Czech Republic) Karolína Plíšková	6–0, 2–1, ret.	(Chinese Taipei) Hsieh Su-wei (2) (Czech Republic) Barbora Strýcová (2)	(Germany) Anna-Lena Friedsam (Romania) Raluca Olaru	6–2, 6–2

=== 2021 ===
Tournament	Singles champions	Runners-up	Score	Doubles champions	Runners-up	Score
Dubai Singles – Doubles	(Spain) Garbiñe Muguruza	(Czech Republic) Barbora Krejčíková	7–6^{(8–6)}, 6–3	(Chile) Alexa Guarachi* (Croatia) Darija Jurak*	(China) Xu Yifan (China) Yang Zhaoxuan	6–0, 6–3
Miami Singles – Doubles	(Australia) Ashleigh Barty	(Canada) Bianca Andreescu	6–3, 4–0, ret.	(Japan) Shuko Aoyama* (Japan) Ena Shibahara*	(United States) Hayley Carter (Brazil) Luisa Stefani	6–2, 7–5
Madrid Singles – Doubles	(Belarus) Aryna Sabalenka	(Australia) Ashleigh Barty	6–0, 3–6, 6–4	(Czech Republic) Barbora Krejčíková (Czech Republic) Kateřina Siniaková	(Canada) Gabriela Dabrowski (Netherlands) Demi Schuurs	6–4, 6–3
Rome Singles – Doubles	(Poland) Iga Świątek*	(Czech Republic) Karolína Plíšková	6–0, 6–0	(Canada) Sharon Fichman* (Mexico) Giuliana Olmos*	(France) Kristina Mladenovic (Czech Republic) Markéta Vondroušová	4–6, 7–5, [10–5]
Montréal Singles – Doubles	(Italy) Camila Giorgi*	(Czech Republic) Karolína Plíšková	6–3, 7–5	(Canada) Gabriela Dabrowski	(Croatia) Darija Jurak (Slovenia) Andreja Klepač	6–3, 6–4
Montréal Singles – Doubles	(Italy) Camila Giorgi*	(Czech Republic) Karolína Plíšková	6–3, 7–5	(Brazil) Luisa Stefani*	(Croatia) Darija Jurak (Slovenia) Andreja Klepač	6–3, 6–4
Cincinnati Singles – Doubles	(Australia) Ashleigh Barty (2)	(Switzerland) Jil Teichmann	6–3, 6–1	(Australia) Samantha Stosur	(Canada) Gabriela Dabrowski (Brazil) Luisa Stefani	7–5, 6–3
Cincinnati Singles – Doubles	(Australia) Ashleigh Barty (2)	(Switzerland) Jil Teichmann	6–3, 6–1	(China) Zhang Shuai*	(Canada) Gabriela Dabrowski (Brazil) Luisa Stefani	7–5, 6–3
Indian Wells Singles – Doubles	(Spain) Paula Badosa*	(Belarus) Victoria Azarenka	7–6^{(7–5)}, 2–6, 7–6^{(7–2)}	(Chinese Taipei) Hsieh Su-wei (Belgium) Elise Mertens	(Russia) Veronika Kudermetova (Kazakhstan) Elena Rybakina	7–6^{(7–1)}, 6–3
Wuhan	Cancelled due to the COVID-19 pandemic.					
Beijing	Cancelled due to the COVID-19 pandemic.					

=== 2022 ===
Tournament	Singles champions	Runners-up	Score	Doubles champions	Runners-up	Score
Doha Singles – Doubles	(Poland) Iga Świątek	(Estonia) Anett Kontaveit	6–2, 6–0	(United States) Coco Gauff* (United States) Jessica Pegula*	Veronika Kudermetova (Belgium) Elise Mertens	3–6, 7–5, [10–5]
Indian Wells Singles – Doubles	(Poland) Iga Świątek (2)	(Greece) Maria Sakkari	6–4, 6–1	(China) Xu Yifan	(United States) Asia Muhammad (Japan) Ena Shibahara	7–5, 7–6^{(7–4)}
Indian Wells Singles – Doubles	(Poland) Iga Świątek (2)	(Greece) Maria Sakkari	6–4, 6–1	(China) Yang Zhaoxuan*	(United States) Asia Muhammad (Japan) Ena Shibahara	7–5, 7–6^{(7–4)}
Miami Singles – Doubles	(Poland) Iga Świątek (3)	(Japan) Naomi Osaka	6–4, 6–0	(Germany) Laura Siegemund*	Veronika Kudermetova (Belgium) Elise Mertens	7–6^{(7–3)}, 7–5
Miami Singles – Doubles	(Poland) Iga Świątek (3)	(Japan) Naomi Osaka	6–4, 6–0	Vera Zvonareva	Veronika Kudermetova (Belgium) Elise Mertens	7–6^{(7–3)}, 7–5
Madrid Singles – Doubles	(Tunisia) Ons Jabeur*	(United States) Jessica Pegula	7–5, 0–6, 6–2	(Canada) Gabriela Dabrowski (Mexico) Giuliana Olmos	(United States) Desirae Krawczyk (Netherlands) Demi Schuurs	7–6^{(7–1)}, 5–7, [10–7]
Rome Singles – Doubles	(Poland) Iga Świątek (4)	(Tunisia) Ons Jabeur	6–2, 6–2	Veronika Kudermetova; Anastasia Pavlyuchenkova	(Canada) Gabriela Dabrowski (Mexico) Giuliana Olmos	1–6, 6–4, [10–7]
Toronto Singles – Doubles	(Romania) Simona Halep	(Brazil) Beatriz Haddad Maia	6–3, 2–6, 6–3	(United States) Coco Gauff (2) (United States) Jessica Pegula (2)	(United States) Nicole Melichar-Martinez (Australia) Ellen Perez	6–4, 6–7^{(5–7)}, [10–5]
Cincinnati Singles – Doubles	(France) Caroline Garcia	(Czech Republic) Petra Kvitová	6–2, 6–4	(Ukraine) Lyudmyla Kichenok*	(United States) Nicole Melichar-Martinez (Australia) Ellen Perez	7–6^{(7–5)}, 6–3
Cincinnati Singles – Doubles	(France) Caroline Garcia	(Czech Republic) Petra Kvitová	6–2, 6–4	(Latvia) Jeļena Ostapenko	(United States) Nicole Melichar-Martinez (Australia) Ellen Perez	7–6^{(7–5)}, 6–3
Guadalajara Singles – Doubles	(United States) Jessica Pegula	(Greece) Maria Sakkari	6–2, 6–3	(Australia) Storm Hunter*	(Kazakhstan) Anna Danilina (Brazil) Beatriz Haddad Maia	7–6^{(7–4)}, 6–7^{(2–7)}, [10–8]
Guadalajara Singles – Doubles	(United States) Jessica Pegula	(Greece) Maria Sakkari	6–2, 6–3	(Brazil) Luisa Stefani	(Kazakhstan) Anna Danilina (Brazil) Beatriz Haddad Maia	7–6^{(7–4)}, 6–7^{(2–7)}, [10–8]
Wuhan	Suspended due to Peng Shuai allegation.					
Beijing	Suspended due to Peng Shuai allegation.					

=== 2023 ===
Tournament	Singles champions	Runners-up	Score	Doubles champions	Runners-up	Score
Dubai Singles – Doubles	(Czech Republic) Barbora Krejčíková*	(Poland) Iga Świątek	6–4, 6–2	Veronika Kudermetova	(Chinese Taipei) Chan Hao-ching (Chinese Taipei) Latisha Chan	6–4, 6–7^{(4–7)}, [10–1]
Dubai Singles – Doubles	(Czech Republic) Barbora Krejčíková*	(Poland) Iga Świątek	6–4, 6–2	Liudmila Samsonova*	(Chinese Taipei) Chan Hao-ching (Chinese Taipei) Latisha Chan	6–4, 6–7^{(4–7)}, [10–1]
Indian Wells Singles – Doubles	(Kazakhstan) Elena Rybakina*	Aryna Sabalenka	7–6^{(13–11)}, 6–4	(Czech Republic) Barbora Krejčíková (Czech Republic) Kateřina Siniaková	(Brazil) Beatriz Haddad Maia (Germany) Laura Siegemund	6–1, 6–7^{(3–7)}, [10–7]
Miami Singles – Doubles	(Czech Republic) Petra Kvitová	(Kazakhstan) Elena Rybakina	7–6^{(16–14)}, 6–2	(United States) Coco Gauff (United States) Jessica Pegula	(Canada) Leylah Fernandez (United States) Taylor Townsend	7–6^{(8–6)}, 6–2
Madrid Singles – Doubles	Aryna Sabalenka	(Poland) Iga Świątek	6–3, 3–6, 6–3	Victoria Azarenka	(United States) Coco Gauff (United States) Jessica Pegula	6–1, 6–4
Madrid Singles – Doubles	Aryna Sabalenka	(Poland) Iga Świątek	6–3, 3–6, 6–3	(Brazil) Beatriz Haddad Maia*	(United States) Coco Gauff (United States) Jessica Pegula	6–1, 6–4
Rome Singles – Doubles	(Kazakhstan) Elena Rybakina (2)	(Ukraine) Anhelina Kalinina	6–4, 1–0, ret.	(Australia) Storm Hunter (Belgium) Elise Mertens	(United States) Coco Gauff (United States) Jessica Pegula	6–4, 6–4
Montréal Singles – Doubles	(United States) Jessica Pegula	Liudmila Samsonova	6–1, 6–0	(Japan) Shuko Aoyama (Japan) Ena Shibahara	(United States) Desirae Krawczyk (Netherlands) Demi Schuurs	6–4, 4–6, [13–11]
Cincinnati Singles – Doubles	(United States) Coco Gauff*	(Czech Republic) Karolína Muchová	6–3, 6–4	(United States) Alycia Parks* (United States) Taylor Townsend*	(United States) Nicole Melichar-Martinez (Australia) Ellen Perez	6–7^{(1–7)}, 6–4, [10–6]
Guadalajara Singles – Doubles	(Greece) Maria Sakkari*	(United States) Caroline Dolehide	7–5, 6–1	(Australia) Storm Hunter (2) (Belgium) Elise Mertens (2)	(Canada) Gabriela Dabrowski (New Zealand) Erin Routliffe	3–6, 6–2, [10–4]
Beijing Singles – Doubles	(Poland) Iga Świątek	Liudmila Samsonova	6–2, 6–2	(Czech Republic) Marie Bouzková* (Spain) Sara Sorribes Tormo*	(Chinese Taipei) Chan Hao-ching (Mexico) Giuliana Olmos	3–6, 6–0, [10–4]

=== 2024 ===
Tournament	Singles champions	Runners-up	Score	Doubles champions	Runners-up	Score
Doha Singles – Doubles	(Poland) Iga Świątek	(Kazakhstan) Elena Rybakina	7–6^{(10–8)}, 6–2	(Netherlands) Demi Schuurs (Brazil) Luisa Stefani	(United States) Desirae Krawczyk (United States) Caroline Dolehide	6–4, 6–2
Dubai Singles – Doubles	(Italy) Jasmine Paolini*	Anna Kalinskaya	4–6, 7–5, 7–5	(Australia) Storm Hunter (Czech Republic) Kateřina Siniaková	(United States) Nicole Melichar-Martinez (Australia) Ellen Perez	6–4, 6–2
Indian Wells Singles – Doubles	(Poland) Iga Świątek (2)	(Greece) Maria Sakkari	6–4, 6–0	(Chinese Taipei) Hsieh Su-wei (Belgium) Elise Mertens	(Australia) Storm Hunter (Czech Republic) Kateřina Siniaková	6–3, 6–4
Miami Singles – Doubles	(United States) Danielle Collins*	(Kazakhstan) Elena Rybakina	7–5, 6–3	(United States) Sofia Kenin (United States) Bethanie Mattek-Sands	(Canada) Gabriela Dabrowski (New Zealand) Erin Routliffe	4–6, 7–6^{(7–5)}, [11–9]
Madrid Singles – Doubles	(Poland) Iga Świątek (3)	Aryna Sabalenka	7–5, 4–6, 7–6^{(9–7)}	(Spain) Cristina Bucșa*	(Czech Republic) Barbora Krejčíková (Germany) Laura Siegemund	6–0, 6–2
Madrid Singles – Doubles	(Poland) Iga Świątek (3)	Aryna Sabalenka	7–5, 4–6, 7–6^{(9–7)}	(Spain) Sara Sorribes Tormo	(Czech Republic) Barbora Krejčíková (Germany) Laura Siegemund	6–0, 6–2
Rome Singles – Doubles	(Poland) Iga Świątek (4)	Aryna Sabalenka	6–2, 6–3	(Italy) Sara Errani	(United States) Coco Gauff (New Zealand) Erin Routliffe	6–3, 4–6, [10–8]
Rome Singles – Doubles	(Poland) Iga Świątek (4)	Aryna Sabalenka	6–2, 6–3	(Italy) Jasmine Paolini*	(United States) Coco Gauff (New Zealand) Erin Routliffe	6–3, 4–6, [10–8]
Toronto Singles – Doubles	(United States) Jessica Pegula	(United States) Amanda Anisimova	6–3, 2–6, 6–1	(United States) Desirae Krawczyk* (United States) Caroline Dolehide*	(Canada) Gabriela Dabrowski (New Zealand) Erin Routliffe	7–6^{(7–2)}, 3–6, [10–7]
Cincinnati Singles – Doubles	Aryna Sabalenka	(United States) Jessica Pegula	6–3, 7–5	(United States) Asia Muhammad* (New Zealand) Erin Routliffe*	(Canada) Leylah Fernandez (Kazakhstan) Yulia Putintseva	3–6, 6–1, [10–4]
Beijing Singles – Doubles	(United States) Coco Gauff	(Czech Republic) Karolína Muchová	6–1, 6–3	(Italy) Sara Errani (2) (Italy) Jasmine Paolini (2)	(Chinese Taipei) Chan Hao-ching; Veronika Kudermetova	6-4, 6–4
Wuhan Singles – Doubles	Aryna Sabalenka (2)	(China) Zheng Qinwen	6–3, 5–7, 6–3	(Kazakhstan) Anna Danilina*; Irina Khromacheva*	(United States) Asia Muhammad (United States) Jessica Pegula	6–3, 7–6^{(8–6)}

=== 2025 ===
Tournament	Singles champions	Runners-up	Score	Doubles champions	Runners-up	Score
Qatar Open Singles – Doubles	(United States) Amanda Anisimova*	(Latvia) Jeļena Ostapenko	6–4, 6–3	(Italy) Sara Errani (Italy) Jasmine Paolini	(China) Jiang Xinyu (Chinese Taipei) Wu Fang-hsien	7–5, 7–6^{(12–10)}
Dubai Open Singles – Doubles	Mirra Andreeva*	(Denmark) Clara Tauson	7–6^{(7–1)}, 6–1	(Czech Republic) Kateřina Siniaková (United States) Taylor Townsend	(Chinese Taipei) Hsieh Su-wei (Latvia) Jeļena Ostapenko	7–6^{(7–5)}, 6–4
Indian Wells Open Singles – Doubles	Mirra Andreeva (2)	Aryna Sabalenka	2–6, 6–4, 6–3	(United States) Asia Muhammad (Netherlands) Demi Schuurs	(Slovakia) Tereza Mihalíková (United Kingdom) Olivia Nicholls	6–2, 7–6^{(7–4)}
Miami Open Singles – Doubles	Aryna Sabalenka	(United States) Jessica Pegula	7–5, 6–2	Mirra Andreeva; Diana Shnaider	(Spain) Cristina Bucșa (Japan) Miyu Kato	6–3, 6–7^{(5–7)}, [10–2]
Madrid Open Singles – Doubles	Aryna Sabalenka (2)	(United States) Coco Gauff	6–3, 7–6^{(7–3)}	(Romania) Sorana Cîrstea*; Anna Kalinskaya*	Veronika Kudermetova (Belgium) Elise Mertens	6–7^{(10–12)}, 6–2, [12–10]
Italian Open Singles – Doubles	(Italy) Jasmine Paolini	(United States) Coco Gauff	6–4, 6–2	(Italy) Sara Errani (2) (Italy) Jasmine Paolini (2)	Veronika Kudermetova (Belgium) Elise Mertens	6–4, 7–5
Canadian Open Singles – Doubles	(Canada) Victoria Mboko*	(Japan) Naomi Osaka	2–6, 6–4, 6–1	(United States) Coco Gauff	(United States) Taylor Townsend (China) Zhang Shuai	6–4, 1–6, [13–11]
Canadian Open Singles – Doubles	(Canada) Victoria Mboko*	(Japan) Naomi Osaka	2–6, 6–4, 6–1	(United States) McCartney Kessler*	(United States) Taylor Townsend (China) Zhang Shuai	6–4, 1–6, [13–11]
Cincinnati Open Singles – Doubles	(Poland) Iga Świątek	(Italy) Jasmine Paolini	7–5, 6–4	(Canada) Gabriela Dabrowski (New Zealand) Erin Routliffe	(China) Guo Hanyu; Alexandra Panova	6–4, 6–3
China Open Singles – Doubles	(United States) Amanda Anisimova (2)	(Czech Republic) Linda Nosková	6–0, 2–6, 6–2	(Italy) Sara Errani (3) (Italy) Jasmine Paolini (3)	(Japan) Miyu Kato (Hungary) Fanny Stollár	6–7^{(1–7)}, 6–3, [10–2]
Wuhan Open Singles – Doubles	(United States) Coco Gauff	(United States) Jessica Pegula	6–4, 7–5	(Australia) Storm Hunter (Czech Republic) Kateřina Siniaková (2)	(Kazakhstan) Anna Danilina (Serbia) Aleksandra Krunić	6–3, 6–2

== Records ==
- Active players in **bold**.

=== Title leaders ===
Singles
No.	Titles
23	(United States) Serena Williams
17	(Switzerland) Martina Hingis
15	(Germany) Steffi Graf
14	(Russia) Maria Sharapova
12	(Poland) **Iga Świątek**
11	(United States) Lindsay Davenport
11	(Belarus) **Aryna Sabalenka**
10	(Belgium) Justine Henin
10	(Belarus) **Victoria Azarenka**
9	(Spain) Conchita Martínez
9	(Socialist Federal Republic of Yugoslavia) / (United States) Monica Seles
9	(United States) **Venus Williams**
9	(Romania) Simona Halep
9	(Czech Republic) Petra Kvitová

Doubles
No.	Titles
26	(Switzerland) Martina Hingis
24	(United States) Lisa Raymond
23	(Belarus) Natasha Zvereva
19	(Australia) Rennae Stubbs
17	(Zimbabwe) Cara Black
16	(Spain) Arantxa Sánchez Vicario
14	(Czechoslovakia) Jana Novotná
14	(United States) Liezel Huber
13	(Chinese Taipei) **Hsieh Su-wei**
11	(Spain) Virginia Ruano Pascual

=== Different titles ===
Doubles
No.	Player
12	Martina Hingis
12	Liezel Huber
11	Cara Black
10	Lisa Raymond
10	Natasha Zvereva
10	Rennae Stubbs

Singles
No.	Player
9	Martina Hingis (Note: Hingis is the only player to win all nine active Tier I events during 1997–2000.)
9	Maria Sharapova
8	Steffi Graf
8	Serena Williams
8	Iga Świątek

=== Double crown ===
- Winning the same WTA 1000 tournament in both singles and doubles in the same year.

No.	Player	Event
4	(Switzerland) Martina Hingis	Charleston (1997), Tokyo (2000), Canada (2000), Zürich (2000)
3	(United States) Martina Navratilova	Chicago (1990), Charleston (1990), Tokyo (1993)
3	(Spain) Arantxa Sánchez Vicario	Miami (1992), Canada (1994), Charleston (1996)
3	(United States) Lindsay Davenport	Indian Wells (1997, 2000), Zürich (2001)
1	(Socialist Federal Republic of Yugoslavia) Monica Seles	Rome (1990)
1	(France) Mary Pierce	Moscow (1998)
1	(Spain) Conchita Martínez	Berlin (2000)
1	(Russia) Anastasia Myskina	Moscow (2004)
1	(Russia) Vera Zvonareva	Indian Wells (2009)
1	(Italy) Jasmine Paolini	Rome (2025)

== See also ==
WTA Tour

- WTA Premier Mandatory and Premier 5
- WTA Tier I tournaments
- List of WTA Tour top-level tournament singles champions
- List of WTA Tour top-level tournament doubles champions

ATP Tour

- ATP Tour Masters 1000
- Grand Prix Super Series
- Tennis Masters Series singles records and statistics
- Tennis Masters Series doubles records and statistics
- List of ATP Tour top-level tournament singles champions
- List of ATP Tour top-level tournament doubles champions
