= 2004 Toray Pan Pacific Open – Singles =

Singles
- 2004 Toray Pan Pacific Open

Final
- Champion: (United States) Lindsay Davenport
- Runner-up: (Bulgaria) Magdalena Maleeva
- Score: 6–4, 6–1

Details
- Draw: 28 (4 Q / 3 WC )
- Seeds: 8

Events
Singles	Doubles
← 2003 ·	Pan Pacific Open	· 2005 →

Defending champion Lindsay Davenport defeated Magdalena Maleeva in the final, 6–4, 6–1 to win the singles tennis title at the 2004 Pan Pacific Open. It was her first title of the season, and the 39th of her career.

== Seeds ==
The first four seeds received a bye into the second round.

1. (United States) Venus Williams (quarterfinals, withdrew due to a lower right leg strain)
2. (United States) Lindsay Davenport (champion)
3. (Russia) Elena Dementieva (second round)
4. (Japan) Ai Sugiyama (quarterfinals)
5. (United States) Chanda Rubin (semifinals, withdrew due to a left knee irritation)
6. (Russia) ~~Nadia Petrova~~ (withdrew due to a left hip flexor strain)
7. (Serbia and Montenegro) Jelena Dokic (semifinals)
8. (Slovakia) Daniela Hantuchová (quarterfinals)

== Draw ==
=== Key ===
- Q = Qualifier
- WC = Wild card
- LL = Lucky loser
- Alt = Alternate
- SE = Special exempt
- PR = Protected ranking
- ITF = ITF entry
- JE = Junior exempt
- w/o = Walkover
- r = Retired
- d = Defaulted
- SR = Special ranking

=== Finals ===
Semifinals
5	(United States) Chanda Rubin
(Bulgaria) Magdalena Maleeva	w/o
7	(Serbia and Montenegro) Jelena Dokic	1	0
2	(United States) Lindsay Davenport	6	6

Final
(Bulgaria) Magdalena Maleeva	4	1
2	(United States) Lindsay Davenport	6	6

=== Top half ===
First round
LL	(Ukraine) J Vakulenko	5	3
(Japan) S Obata	7	6
(Japan) S Asagoe	4	6^{5}
Q	(Japan) A Morigami	6	7^{7}
Q	(Italy) R Grande	3	0
5	(United States) C Rubin	6	6
Q	(Belgium) E Callens	6	6
(Russia) L Krasnoroutskaya	3	4
(Bulgaria) M Maleeva	4	6	6
(United States) L Raymond	6	2	3
(United States) L Granville	7	6
LL	(Russia) A Jidkova	5	2

Second round
PR/1	(United States) V Williams	6	6
(Japan) S Obata	3	4
Q	(Japan) A Morigami	5	7^{7}	3
5	(United States) C Rubin	7	6^{3}	6
4	(Japan) A Sugiyama	6	6
Q	(Belgium) E Callens	3	3
(Bulgaria) M Maleeva	6	6
(United States) L Granville	1	3

Quarterfinals
PR/1	(United States) V Williams
5	(United States) C Rubin	w/o
4	(Japan) A Sugiyama	1	1
(Bulgaria) M Maleeva	6	6

Semifinals
5	(United States) C Rubin
(Bulgaria) M Maleeva	w/o

=== Bottom half ===
First round
7	(Serbia and Montenegro) J Dokic	3	7^{7}	6
WC	(Zimbabwe) C Black	6	6^{5}	1
(Thailand) T Tanasugarn	6^{8}	3
Q	(Slovakia) J Husárová	7^{10}	6
WC	(China) J Zheng	4	3
PR	(Russia) T Panova	6	6
8	(Slovakia) D Hantuchová	6	6^{7}	7
(Australia) A Molik	1	7^{9}	5
WC	(Japan) Y Yoshida	1	1
(Russia) M Sharapova	6	6
(Venezuela) M Vento-Kabchi	6	7^{7}
(Russia) E Likhovtseva	3	6^{5}

Second round
7	(Serbia and Montenegro) J Dokic	7^{9}	6^{2}	6
Q	(Slovakia) J Husárová	6^{7}	7^{7}	1
PR	(Russia) T Panova	7^{7}	6
3	(Russia) E Dementieva	6^{5}	3
8	(Slovakia) D Hantuchová	7^{8}	6
(Russia) M Sharapova	6^{6}	1
(Venezuela) M Vento-Kabchi	2	1
2	(United States) L Davenport	6	6

Quarterfinals
7	(Serbia and Montenegro) J Dokic	6	6
PR	(Russia) T Panova	1	1
8	(Slovakia) D Hantuchová	2	2
2	(United States) L Davenport	6	6

Semifinals
7	(Serbia and Montenegro) J Dokic	1	0
2	(United States) L Davenport	6	6
