= 2005 Toray Pan Pacific Open – Doubles =

Doubles
- 2005 Toray Pan Pacific Open

Final
- Champions: (Slovakia) Janette Husárová (Russia) Elena Likhovtseva
- Runners-up: (United States) Lindsay Davenport (United States) Corina Morariu
- Score: 6–4, 6–3

Events
Singles	Doubles
← 2004 ·	Toray Pan Pacific Open	· 2006 →

Cara Black and Rennae Stubbs were the defending champions, but Stubbs did not compete this year. Black teamed up with Liezel Huber and lost in quarterfinals to tournament runners-up Lindsay Davenport and Corina Morariu.

Janette Husárová and Elena Likhovtseva won the title by defeating Davenport and Morariu 6–4, 6–3 in the final.

== Seeds ==
1. (Zimbabwe) Cara Black / (South Africa) Liezel Huber (quarterfinals)
2. (Slovakia) Janette Husárová / (Russia) Elena Likhovtseva (champions)
3. (Russia) Elena Dementieva / (Japan) Ai Sugiyama (semifinals, withdrew due to a sprain right finger injury on Dementieva)
4. (Australia) Nicole Pratt / (Venezuela) María Vento-Kabchi (semifinals)

== Draw ==
=== Key ===
- Q = Qualifier
- WC = Wild card
- LL = Lucky loser
- Alt = Alternate
- SE = Special exempt
- PR = Protected ranking
- ITF = ITF entry
- JE = Junior exempt
- w/o = Walkover
- r = Retired
- d = Defaulted
- SR = Special ranking

=== Draw ===
First round
1	(Zimbabwe) C Black (South Africa) L Huber	6	5	6
(Chinese Taipei) J Lee (China) S Peng	2	7	0
(United States) L Davenport (United States) C Morariu	6	6
(Japan) S Okamoto (Japan) Y Yoshida	2	2
3	(Russia) E Dementieva (Japan) A Sugiyama	6	0	6
(Japan) S Asagoe (Serbia and Montenegro) J Janković	3	6	1
WC	(Japan) A Morigami (Japan) M Saeki	2	5
(Slovenia) T Križan (Italy) R Vinci	6	7
Q	(Japan) R Takemura (Japan) T Yonemura	7^{7}	2	7
(South Korea) Y-j Cho (South Korea) M-r Jeon	6^{4}	6	5
(Russia) A Jidkova (Spain) A Parra Santonja	3	2
4	(Australia) N Pratt (Venezuela) M Vento-Kabchi	6	6
(Belgium) E Callens (Australia) L McShea	6	2	7
(United States) J Craybas (United States) M Tu	0	6	5
(Latvia) L Dekmeijere (United States) L Osterloh	3	5
2	(Slovakia) J Husárová (Russia) E Likhovtseva	6	7

Quarterfinals
1	(Zimbabwe) C Black (South Africa) L Huber	1	3
(United States) L Davenport (United States) C Morariu	6	6
3	(Russia) E Dementieva (Japan) A Sugiyama	6	6
(Slovenia) T Križan (Italy) R Vinci	2	3
Q	(Japan) R Takemura (Japan) T Yonemura	4	6^{3}
4	(Australia) N Pratt (Venezuela) M Vento-Kabchi	6	7^{7}
(Belgium) E Callens (Australia) L McShea	6^{2}	5
2	(Slovakia) J Husárová (Russia) E Likhovtseva	7^{7}	7

Semifinals
(United States) L Davenport (United States) C Morariu	w/o
3	(Russia) E Dementieva (Japan) A Sugiyama
4	(Australia) N Pratt (Venezuela) M Vento-Kabchi	3	3
2	(Slovakia) J Husárová (Russia) E Likhovtseva	6	6

Final
(United States) L Davenport (United States) C Morariu	4	3
2	(Slovakia) J Husárová (Russia) E Likhovtseva	6	6
