= 2005 Toray Pan Pacific Open =

- Date: January 28 – February 6
- Edition: 22nd
- Category: Tier I
- Prize money: $1,300,000
- Surface: Carpet / indoor
- Location: Tokyo, Japan
- Venue: Tokyo Metropolitan Gymnasium

Champions

Singles
- (Russia) Maria Sharapova

Doubles
- (Slovakia) Janette Husárová / (Russia) Elena Likhovtseva
← 2004 ·	Pan Pacific Open	· 2006 →

The 2005 Toray Pan Pacific Open was a women's tennis tournament played on indoor carpet courts. It was the 22nd edition of the Toray Pan Pacific Open, and was part of the Tier I Series of the 2005 WTA Tour. It took place at the Tokyo Metropolitan Gymnasium in Tokyo, Japan, from January 28 through February 6, 2005. Second-seeded Maria Sharapova won the singles title.

== Finals ==
=== Singles ===
(Russia) Maria Sharapova defeated (United States) Lindsay Davenport, 6–1, 3–6, 7–6

=== Doubles ===
(Slovakia) Janette Husárová / (Russia) Elena Likhovtseva defeated (United States) Lindsay Davenport / (United States) Corina Morariu, 6–4, 6–3
