= 2004 Toray Pan Pacific Open – Doubles =

Doubles
- 2004 Toray Pan Pacific Open

Final
- Champions: (Zimbabwe) Cara Black (Australia) Rennae Stubbs
- Runners-up: (Russia) Elena Likhovtseva (Bulgaria) Magdalena Maleeva
- Score: 6–0, 6–1

Events
Singles	Doubles
← 2003 ·	Toray Pan Pacific Open	· 2005 →

Elena Bovina and Rennae Stubbs were the defending champions, but had different outcomes. While Bovina did not compete this year, Stubbs partnered with Cara Black and successfully defended her title, defeating Elena Likhovtseva and Magdalena Maleeva 6–0, 6–1 in the final. It was the 2nd title in the year for the pair, and the 14th title for Black and 44th title for Stubbs, in their respective careers.

== Seeds ==
1. (United States) Martina Navratilova / (United States) Lisa Raymond (semifinals)
2. (South Africa) Liezel Huber / (Japan) Ai Sugiyama (quarterfinals)
3. (Zimbabwe) Cara Black / (Australia) Rennae Stubbs (champions)
4. (Russia) Elena Likhovtseva / (Bulgaria) Magdalena Maleeva (final)

== Draw ==
=== Key ===
- Q = Qualifier
- WC = Wild card
- LL = Lucky loser
- Alt = Alternate
- SE = Special exempt
- PR = Protected ranking
- ITF = ITF entry
- JE = Junior exempt
- w/o = Walkover
- r = Retired
- d = Defaulted
- SR = Special ranking

=== Draw ===
First round
1	(United States) M Navratilova (United States) L Raymond	6	6
(Slovenia) T Križan (Slovenia) K Srebotnik	1	0
(Japan) N Miyagi (United States) S Reeves	2	6	1
(Italy) R Grande (Chinese Taipei) J Lee	6	3	6
3	(Zimbabwe) C Black (Australia) R Stubbs	7	6
LL	(Russia) A Jidkova (United States) A Spears	5	3
(Russia) E Dementieva (Russia) L Krasnoroutskaya	4	6	3
(Venezuela) M Vento-Kabchi (Indonesia) A Widjaja	6	4	6
(Serbia and Montenegro) J Dokic (Slovakia) J Husárová	2	4
Q	(Indonesia) W Prakusya (Thailand) T Tanasugarn	6	6
WC	(Japan) M Saeki (Japan) Y Yoshida	6	4	2
4	(Russia) E Likhovtseva (Bulgaria) M Maleeva	4	6	6
(Belgium) E Callens (Slovakia) D Hantuchová	0	6^{2}
WC	(United States) L Davenport (United States) C Morariu	6	7^{7}
(Japan) S Asagoe (United States) M Tu	2	2
2	(South Africa) L Huber (Japan) A Sugiyama	6	6

Quarterfinals
1	(United States) M Navratilova (United States) L Raymond	6	7^{7}
(Italy) R Grande (Chinese Taipei) J Lee	2	6^{4}
3	(Zimbabwe) C Black (Australia) R Stubbs	2	6	6
(Venezuela) M Vento-Kabchi (Indonesia) A Widjaja	6	2	2
Q	(Indonesia) W Prakusya (Thailand) T Tanasugarn	2	5
4	(Russia) E Likhovtseva (Bulgaria) M Maleeva	6	7
WC	(United States) L Davenport (United States) C Morariu	6	6
2	(South Africa) L Huber (Japan) A Sugiyama	4	2

Semifinals
1	(United States) M Navratilova (United States) L Raymond	6	3	4
3	(Zimbabwe) C Black (Australia) R Stubbs	2	6	6
4	(Russia) E Likhovtseva (Bulgaria) M Maleeva	4	6	6
WC	(United States) L Davenport (United States) C Morariu	6	3	4

Final
3	(Zimbabwe) C Black (Australia) R Stubbs	6	6
4	(Russia) E Likhovtseva (Bulgaria) M Maleeva	0	1
