= 2005 Toray Pan Pacific Open – Singles =

Singles
- 2005 Toray Pan Pacific Open

Final
- Champion: (Russia) Maria Sharapova
- Runner-up: (United States) Lindsay Davenport
- Score: 6–1, 3–6, 7–6^{(7–5)}

Details
- Draw: 28 (4 Q / 2 WC )
- Seeds: 8

Events
Singles	Doubles
← 2004 ·	Pan Pacific Open	· 2006 →

Maria Sharapova defeated the two-time defending champion Lindsay Davenport in the final, 6–1, 3–6, 7–6^{(7–5)} to win the singles tennis title at the 2005 Pan Pacific Open.

== Seeds ==
The top four seeds received a bye into the second round.

1. (United States) Lindsay Davenport (final)
2. (Russia) Maria Sharapova (champion)
3. (Russia) Svetlana Kuznetsova (semifinals)
4. (Russia) Elena Dementieva (quarterfinals)
5. (Japan) Ai Sugiyama (first round)
6. (Russia) Elena Likhovtseva (quarterfinals)
7. (Serbia and Montenegro) Jelena Janković (first round)
8. (Slovakia) Daniela Hantuchová (quarterfinals)

== Draw ==
=== Key ===
- Q = Qualifier
- WC = Wild card
- LL = Lucky loser
- Alt = Alternate
- ITF = ITF entry
- PR = Protected ranking
- SR = Special ranking
- SE = Special exempt
- JE = Junior exempt
- JR = Junior Accelerator Programme entrant
- CO = College Accelerator Programme entrant
- NG = Next Gen Accelerator Program entrant
- w/o = Walkover
- r = Retired
- d = Defaulted

=== Finals ===
Semifinals
1	(United States) Lindsay Davenport	6	7^{7}
3	(Russia) Svetlana Kuznetsova	1	6^{2}
(Japan) Shinobu Asagoe	1	6^{3}
2	(Russia) Maria Sharapova	6	7^{7}

Final
1	(United States) Lindsay Davenport	1	6	6^{5}
2	(Russia) Maria Sharapova	6	3	7^{7}

=== Top half ===
First round
(Japan) S Obata	6	6
WC	(Japan) M Saeki	0	1
WC	(Japan) A Nakamura	3	6	6
Q	(Japan) R Fuda	6	4	2
(Czech Republic) I Benešová	1	6	6
7	(Serbia and Montenegro) J Janković	6	3	1
(Australia) N Pratt	4	3
Q	(Switzerland) M-G Mikaelian	6	6
(China) S Peng	3	2
(Russia) M Kirilenko	6	6
(Russia) A Jidkova	1	4
8	(Slovakia) D Hantuchová	6	6

Second round
1	(United States) L Davenport	6	6
(Japan) S Obata	4	3
WC	(Japan) A Nakamura	6	5	4
(Czech Republic) I Benešová	3	7	6
3	(Russia) S Kuznetsova	6	6
Q	(Switzerland) M-G Mikaelian	3	1
(Russia) M Kirilenko	6	0	2
8	(Slovakia) D Hantuchová	4	6	6

Quarterfinals
1	(United States) L Davenport	6	6
(Czech Republic) I Benešová	1	2
3	(Russia) S Kuznetsova	7^{7}	7^{7}
8	(Slovakia) D Hantuchová	6^{4}	6^{4}

Semifinals
1	(United States) L Davenport	6	7^{7}
3	(Russia) S Kuznetsova	1	6^{2}

=== Bottom half ===
First round
5	(Japan) A Sugiyama	6	3	2
(Italy) R Vinci	2	6	6
(Japan) S Asagoe	6	6
Q	(Japan) Y Yoshida	2	1
(Japan) A Morigami	6	6
(Spain) M Sánchez Lorenzo	4	1
6	(Russia) E Likhovtseva	6	6
(Spain) A Parra Santonja	0	0
(United States) J Craybas	6	4	7
(Russia) T Panova	4	6	5
(Venezuela) M Vento-Kabchi	6	6
Q	(United States) L Osterloh	3	1

Second round
(Italy) R Vinci	0	2
(Japan) S Asagoe	6	6
(Japan) A Morigami	2	2
4	(Russia) E Dementieva	6	6
6	(Russia) E Likhovtseva	7	4	6
(United States) J Craybas	5	6	2
(Venezuela) M Vento-Kabchi	6^{3}	0
2	(Russia) M Sharapova	7^{7}	6

Quarterfinals
(Japan) S Asagoe	6	6
4	(Russia) E Dementieva	3	4
6	(Russia) E Likhovtseva	3	3
2	(Russia) M Sharapova	6	6

Semifinals
(Japan) S Asagoe	1	6^{3}
2	(Russia) M Sharapova	6	7^{7}
