= 2004 Toray Pan Pacific Open =

- Date: January 30 – February 8
- Edition: 21st
- Category: Tier I
- Draw: 28S / 16D
- Prize money: $1,300,000
- Surface: Carpet / indoor
- Location: Tokyo, Japan
- Venue: Tokyo Metropolitan Gymnasium

Champions

Singles
- (United States) Lindsay Davenport

Doubles
- (Zimbabwe) Cara Black / (Australia) Rennae Stubbs
← 2003 ·	Pan Pacific Open	· 2005 →

The 2004 Toray Pan Pacific Open was a women's tennis tournament played on indoor carpet courts. It was the 21st edition of the Toray Pan Pacific Open, and was part of the Tier I Series of the 2004 WTA Tour. It took place at the Tokyo Metropolitan Gymnasium in Tokyo, Japan, from January 30 through February 8, 2004. Second-seeded Lindsay Davenport won the singles title.

== Finals ==
=== Singles ===
(United States) Lindsay Davenport defeated (Bulgaria) Magdalena Maleeva, 6–4, 6–1

- It was Davenport's 1st singles title of the year and the 39th of her career.

=== Doubles ===
(Zimbabwe) Cara Black / (Australia) Rennae Stubbs defeated (Russia) Elena Likhovtseva / (Bulgaria) Magdalena Maleeva, 6–0, 6–1
