= WTA 1000 Series doubles records and statistics =

List of WTA 1000 records and statistics

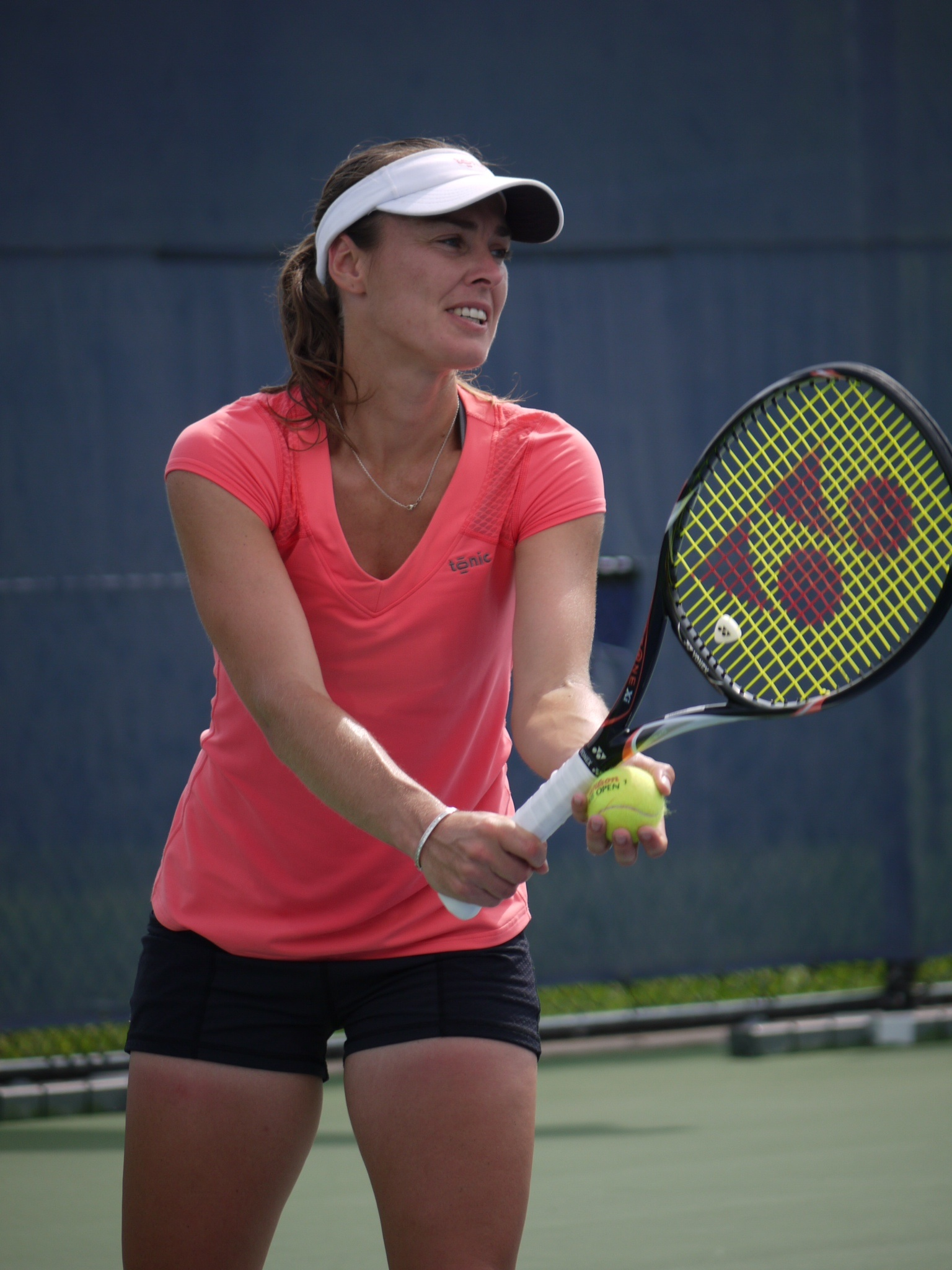
Martina Hingis has won a record 26 WTA 1000 titles in doubles.

WTA 1000 is a category of tennis tournaments on the WTA Tour organized by the Women's Tennis Association.

The Series was initially called WTA Tier I which began in 1988 and lasted until 2008. Records before 1990 are excluded from this list. When the WTA Tour was established in 1990 there were initially six Tier I tournaments held annually in the first three years. The list thereafter expanded to eight events in 1993, nine in 1997 and ten in 2004, before being scaled back to nine for 2008.

In 2009 the WTA changed the tournament categories, so that the majority of Tier I and Tier II tournaments were in one category, Premier Tournaments, split into three categories: two of them being Premier Mandatory and Premier 5, comprising nine events being held with Wuhan, which replaced Tokyo in 2014, as the only exception.

WTA Premier Mandatory and Premier 5 tournaments merged into a single highest tier and it is implemented since the reorganization of the schedule in 2021.

In 2024 the WTA expanded to ten WTA 1000 tournaments, up from nine in 2023, with both Doha and Dubai becoming 1000 events every year instead of alternating. There are ten WTA 1000 tournaments: Doha, Dubai, Indian Wells, Miami, Madrid, Rome, Canada, Cincinnati, Beijing and Wuhan.

These tournaments offer 1000 ranking points for the winner.

Only three tournaments were held in 2020 due to the COVID-19 pandemic: Doha, Rome and Cincinnati.

Guadalajara replaced Wuhan and Beijing in 2022 due to the disappearance of Peng Shuai.

On 1 March 2022, the WTA announced that players from Belarus will not be allowed to compete under the name or flag of Belarus following the 2022 Russian invasion of Ukraine.

== Champions by year ==
- New tournaments underlined.

Active tournaments	Defunct tournaments

Year	Tournaments (Note: All of the listed tournaments were held in chronological order with some exceptions: 1. Berlin was held before Rome between 1990–1999.; 2. Zürich was held before Moscow between 1997–2000.; 3. San Diego was held as the 6th event between 2004–2007.; 4. Canada preceded Cincinnati in 2009–2010.; 5. Rome was held before Madrid between 2009–2011.; 6. Rome was held as the last event in 2020.; 7. Indian Wells was held in October as the last event in 2021.)									
	Chicago (Note: First event of Tokyo was played in Yokohama.)	Tier II	Tier III	Miami	Hilton Head	Berlin	Rome	Canada	not an event	Tier II
1990	Navratilova (1/9); Smith (1/1)	Tier II	Tier III	Novotná (1/14); Suková (1/5)	Navratilova (2/9); Sánchez Vicario (1/16)	Provis (1/1); Reinach (1/1)	Kelesi (1/1); Seles (1/3)	Nagelsen (1/1); Sabatini (1/2)	not an event	Tier II
	Boca Raton	Tier II	Tier III	Miami	Hilton Head	Berlin	Rome	Canada	Tier II	Tier II
1991	Savchenko-Neiland (1/10); Zvereva (1/23)	Tier II	Tier III	M. J. Fernández (1/2); Garrison (1/2)	Kohde-Kilsch (1/1); Zvereva (2/23)	Neiland (2/10); Zvereva (3/23)	Capriati (1/1); Seles (2/3)	Neiland (3/10); Zvereva (4/23)	Tier II	Tier II
1992	Neiland (4/10); Zvereva (5/23)	Tier II	Tier III	Sánchez Vicario (2/16); Neiland (5/10)	Sánchez Vicario (3/16); Zvereva (6/23)	Novotná (2/14); Neiland (6/10)	Seles (3/3); Suková (2/5)	McNeil (1/3); Stubbs (1/19)	Tier II	Tier II
	Tokyo	Tier II	Tier II	Miami	Hilton Head	Berlin	Rome	Canada	Philadelphia	Zürich
1993	Navratilova (3/9); Suková (3/5)	Tier II	Tier II	Neiland (7/10); Novotná (3/14)	G. Fernández (1/9); Zvereva (7/23)	G. Fernández (2/9); Zvereva (8/23)	Novotná (4/14); Sánchez Vicario (4/16)	Neiland (8/10); Novotná (5/14)	Adams (1/1); Bollegraf (1/5)	Garrison-Jackson (2/2); Navratilova (4/9)
1994	Shriver (1/1); Smylie (1/1)	Tier II	Tier II	G. Fernández (3/9); Zvereva (9/23)	McNeil (2/3); Sánchez Vicario (5/16)	G. Fernández (5/9); Zvereva (11/23)	G. Fernández (4/9); Zvereva (10/23)	McGrath (1/2); Sánchez Vicario (6/16)	G. Fernández (6/9); Zvereva (12/23)	Bollegraf (2/5); Navratilova (5/9)
1995	G. Fernández (7/9); Zvereva (13/23)	Tier II	Tier II	Novotná (6/14); Sánchez Vicario (7/16)	Arendt (1/4); Bollegraf (3/5)	Coetzer (1/1); Gorrochategui (1/1)	G. Fernández (8/9); Zvereva (14/23)	Sabatini (2/2); Schultz-McCarthy (1/2)	McNeil (3/3); Suková (4/5)	Arendt (2/4); Bollegraf (4/5)
	Tokyo	Indian Wells	Tier II	Miami	Hilton Head	Berlin	Rome	Canada	Tier II	Zürich
1996	G. Fernández (9/9); Zvereva (15/23)	Rubin (1/1); Schultz-McCarthy (2/2)	Tier II	Novotná (7/14); Sánchez Vicario (8/16)	Novotná (8/14); Sánchez Vicario (9/16)	McGrath (2/2); Neiland (9/10)	Sánchez Vicario (10/16); Spîrlea (1/1)	Neiland (10/10); Sánchez Vicario (11/16)	Tier II	Hingis (1/26); Suková (5/5)
	Tokyo	Indian Wells	Tier II	Miami	Hilton Head	Berlin	Rome	Canada	Moscow	Zürich
1997	Davenport (1/9); Zvereva (16/23)	Davenport (2/9); Zvereva (17/23)	Tier II	Sánchez Vicario (12/16); Zvereva (18/23)	M. J. Fernández (2/2); Hingis (2/26)	Davenport (3/9); Novotná (9/14)	Arendt (3/4); Bollegraf (5/5)	Basuki (1/1); Vis (1/1)	Sánchez Vicario (14/16); Zvereva (19/23)	Hingis (3/26); Sánchez Vicario (13/16)
1998	Hingis (4/26); Lučić (1/1)	Davenport (4/9); Zvereva (20/23)	Tier II	Hingis (5/26); Novotná (10/14)	Martínez (1/4); Tarabini (1/1)	Davenport (5/9); Zvereva (21/23)	Ruano Pascual (1/11); Suárez (1/9)	Hingis (6/26); Novotná (11/14)	Pierce (1/3); Zvereva (22/23)	S. Williams (1/2); V. Williams (1/2)
1999	Davenport (6/9); Zvereva (23/23)	Hingis (7/26); Kournikova (1/4)	Tier II	Hingis (8/26); Novotná (12/14)	Likhovtseva (1/4); Novotná (13/14)	Fusai (1/1); Tauziat (1/3)	Hingis (9/26); Kournikova (2/4)	Novotná (14/14); Pierce (2/3)	Raymond (2/24); Stubbs (3/19)	Raymond (1/24); Stubbs (2/19)
2000	Hingis (10/26); Pierce (3/3)	Davenport (7/9); Morariu (1/1)	Tier II	Halard-Decugis (1/2); Sugiyama (1/9)	Ruano Pascual (2/11); Suárez (2/9)	Martínez (2/4); Sánchez Vicario (15/16)	Raymond (3/24); Stubbs (4/19)	Hingis (11/26); Tauziat (2/3)	Halard-Decugis (2/2); Sugiyama (2/9)	Hingis (12/26); Kournikova (3/4)
	Tokyo	Indian Wells	Tier II	Miami	Charleston	Berlin	Rome	Canada	Moscow	Zürich
2001	Raymond (4/24); Stubbs (5/19)	Arendt (4/4); Sugiyama (3/9)	Tier II	Sánchez Vicario (16/16); Tauziat (3/3)	Raymond (5/24); Stubbs (6/19)	Callens (1/1); Shaughnessy (1/5)	Black (1/17); Likhovtseva (2/4)	Po-Messerli (1/1); Pratt (1/1)	Hingis (13/26); Kournikova (4/4)	Davenport (8/9); Raymond (6/24)
2002	Raymond (7/24); Stubbs (7/19)	Raymond (8/24); Stubbs (8/19)	Tier II	Raymond (9/24); Stubbs (9/19)	Raymond (10/24); Stubbs (10/19)	Dementieva (1/2); Husárová (1/3)	Ruano Pascual (3/11); Suárez (3/9)	Ruano Pascual (4/11); Suárez (4/9)	Dementieva (2/2); Husárová (2/3)	Bovina (1/2); Henin (1/1)
2003	Bovina (2/2); Stubbs (11/19)	Davenport (9/9); Raymond (11/24)	Tier II	Huber (1/14); Maleeva (1/1)	Ruano Pascual (5/11); Suárez (5/9)	Ruano Pascual (6/11); Suárez (6/9)	Kuznetsova (1/4); Navratilova (6/9)	Kuznetsova (2/4); Navratilova (7/9)	Petrova (1/9); Shaughnessy (2/5)	Clijsters (1/1); Sugiyama (4/9)
	Tokyo	Indian Wells	San Diego	Miami	Charleston	Berlin	Rome	Canada	Moscow	Zürich
2004	Black (2/17); Stubbs (12/19)	Ruano Pascual (7/11); Suárez (7/9)	Black (3/17); Stubbs (13/19)	Petrova (2/9); Shaughnessy (3/5)	Ruano Pascual (8/11); Suárez (8/9)	Petrova (3/9); Shaughnessy (4/5)	Petrova (4/9); Shaughnessy (5/5)	Shinobu (1/1); Sugiyama (5/9)	Myskina (1/1); Zvonareva (1/4)	Black (4/17); Stubbs (14/19)
2005	Husárová (3/3); Likhovtseva (3/4)	Ruano Pascual (9/11); Suárez (9/9)	Martínez (4/4); Ruano Pascual (11/11)	Kuznetsova (3/4); Molik (1/1)	Martínez (3/4); Ruano Pascual (10/11)	Likhovtseva (4/4); Zvonareva (2/4)	Black (5/17); Huber (2/14)	Grönefeld (1/1); Navratilova (8/9)	Raymond (12/24); Stosur (1/10)	Black (6/17); Stubbs (15/19)
2006	Raymond (13/24); Stosur (2/10)	Raymond (14/24); Stosur (3/10)	Black (7/17); Stubbs (16/19)	Raymond (15/24); Stosur (4/10)	Raymond (16/24); Stosur (5/10)	Yan (1/2); Zheng (1/3)	Hantuchová (1/2); Sugiyama (6/9)	Navratilova (9/9); Petrova (5/9)	Peschke (1/7); Schiavone (1/2)	Black (8/17); Stubbs (17/19)
2007	Raymond (17/24); Stosur (6/10)	Raymond (18/24); Stosur (7/10)	Black (9/17); Huber (3/14)	Raymond (19/24); Stosur (8/10)	Yan (2/2); Zheng (2/3)	Raymond (20/24); Stosur (9/10)	Dechy (1/1); Santangelo (1/1)	Srebotnik (1/9); Sugiyama (7/9)	Black (10/17); Huber (4/14)	Peschke (2/7); Stubbs (18/19)
	Doha (Note: In 2008 Doha replaced Tokyo, which was moved to September, replacing Zürich.)	Indian Wells	not an event	Miami	Charleston	Berlin	Rome	Canada	Moscow	Tokyo
2008	Peschke (3/7); Stubbs (19/19)	Safina (1/1); Vesnina (1/8)	not an event	Srebotnik (2/9); Sugiyama (8/9)	Srebotnik (3/9); Sugiyama (9/9)	Black (11/17); Huber (5/14)	L. Chan (1/9); Chuang (1/2)	Black (12/17); Huber (6/14)	Petrova (7/9); Srebotnik (4/9)	King (1/2); Petrova (6/9)
	Doha	Dubai	Indian Wells	Miami	Madrid	Rome	Canada	Cincinnati	Tokyo	Beijing
2009	not an event	Black (13/17); Huber (7/14)	Azarenka (1/5); Zvonareva (3/4)	Kuznetsova (4/4); Mauresmo (1/1)	Black (14/17); Huber (8/14)	Hsieh (1/13); Peng (1/8)	Llagostera Vives (1/2); Martínez Sánchez (1/3)	Black (15/17); Huber (9/14)	Kleybanova (1/1); Schiavone (2/2)	Hsieh (2/13); Peng (2/8)
2010	WTA Premier	Llagostera Vives (2/2); Martínez Sánchez (2/3)	Peschke (4/7); Srebotnik (5/9)	Dulko (1/3); Pennetta (1/4)	S. Williams (2/2); V. Williams (2/2)	Dulko (2/3); Pennetta (2/4)	Dulko (3/3); Pennetta (3/4)	Azarenka (2/5); Kirilenko (1/3)	Benešová (1/1); Strýcová (1/8)	Chuang (2/2); Govortsova (1/1)
2011	WTA Premier	Huber (10/14); Martínez Sánchez (3/3)	Mirza (1/9); Vesnina (2/8)	Hantuchová (2/2); Radwańska (1/1)	Azarenka (3/5); Kirilenko (2/3)	Peng (3/8); Zheng (3/3)	Huber (11/14); Raymond (21/24)	King (2/2); Shvedova (1/2)	Huber (12/14); Raymond (22/24)	Peschke (5/7); Srebotnik (6/9)
	Doha	Dubai	Indian Wells	Miami	Madrid	Rome	Canada	Cincinnati	Tokyo	Beijing
2012	Huber (13/14); Raymond (23/24)	WTA Premier	Huber (14/14); Raymond (24/24)	Kirilenko (3/3); Petrova (8/9)	Errani (1/10); Vinci (1/5)	Errani (2/10); Vinci (2/5)	Jans-Ignacik (1/1); Mladenovic (1/4)	Hlaváčková (1/3); Hradecká (1/3)	Kops-Jones (1/2); Spears (1/2)	Makarova (1/7); Vesnina (3/8)
2013	Errani (3/10); Vinci (3/5)	WTA Premier	Makarova (2/7); Vesnina (4/8)	Petrova (9/9); Srebotnik (7/9)	Pavlyuchenkova (1/2); Šafářová (1/5)	Hsieh (3/13); Peng (4/8)	Janković (1/1); Srebotnik (8/9)	Hsieh (4/13); Peng (5/8)	Black (16/17); Mirza (2/9)	Black (17/17); Mirza (3/9)
	Doha	Dubai	Indian Wells	Miami	Madrid	Rome	Canada	Cincinnati	Wuhan	Beijing
2014	Hsieh (5/13); Peng (6/8)	WTA Premier	Hsieh (6/13); Peng (7/8)	Hingis (14/26); Lisicki (1/1)	Errani (4/10); Vinci (4/5)	Peschke (6/7); Srebotnik (9/9)	Errani (5/10); Vinci (5/5)	Kops-Jones (2/2); Spears (2/2)	Hingis (15/26); Pennetta (4/4)	Hlaváčková (2/3); Peng (8/8)
	Doha	Dubai (Note: Between 2015–2023, Dubai and Doha alternated each year, Dubai played in odd- and Doha in even-numbered years.)	Indian Wells	Miami	Madrid	Rome	Canada	Cincinnati	Wuhan	Beijing
2015	WTA Premier	Babos (1/2); Mladenovic (2/4)	Hingis (16/26); Mirza (4/9)	Hingis (17/26); Mirza (5/9)	Dellacqua (1/1); Shvedova (2/2)	Babos (2/2); Mladenovic (3/4)	Mattek-Sands (1/7); Šafářová (2/5)	H. Chan (1/2); L. Chan (2/9)	Hingis (18/26); Mirza (6/9)	Hingis (19/26); Mirza (7/9)
2016	H. Chan (2/2); L. Chan (3/9)	WTA Premier	Mattek-Sands (2/7); Vandeweghe (1/2)	Mattek-Sands (3/7); Šafářová (3/5)	Garcia (1/1); Mladenovic (4/4)	Hingis (20/26); Mirza (8/9)	Makarova (3/7); Vesnina (5/8)	Mirza (9/9); Strýcová (2/8)	Mattek-Sands (4/7); Šafářová (4/5)	Mattek-Sands (5/7); Šafářová (5/5)
2017	WTA Premier	Makarova (4/7); Vesnina (6/8)	L. Chan (4/9); Hingis (21/26)	Dabrowski (1/8); Xu (1/2)	L. Chan (5/9); Hingis (22/26)	L. Chan (6/9); Hingis (23/26)	Makarova (5/7); Vesnina (7/8)	L. Chan (7/9); Hingis (24/26)	L. Chan (8/9); Hingis (25/26)	L. Chan (9/9); Hingis (26/26)
2018	Dabrowski (2/8); Ostapenko (1/2)	WTA Premier	Hsieh (7/13); Strýcová (3/8)	Barty (1/4); Vandeweghe (2/2)	Makarova (6/7); Vesnina (8/8)	Barty (2/4); Schuurs (1/6)	Barty (3/4); Schuurs (2/6)	Hradecká (2/3); Makarova (7/7)	Mertens (1/7); Schuurs (3/6)	Hlaváčková (3/3); Strýcová (4/8)
2019	WTA Premier	Hsieh (8/13); Strýcová (5/8)	Mertens (2/7); Sabalenka (1/2)	Mertens (3/7); Sabalenka (2/2)	Hsieh (9/13); Strýcová (6/8)	Azarenka (4/5); Barty (4/4)	Krejčíková (1/3); Siniaková (1/10)	Hradecká (3/3); Klepač (1/1)	Duan (1/1); Kudermetova (1/3)	Kenin (1/2); Mattek-Sands (6/7)
2020 (Note: In 2020, Cincinnati was held in October in New York City.)	Hsieh (10/13); Strýcová (7/8)	WTA Premier	not held (Note: Cancelled due to the COVID-19 pandemic.)			Hsieh (11/13); Strýcová (8/8)	not held	Peschke (7/7); Schuurs (4/6)	not held	
2021	WTA 500	Guarachi (1/1); Jurak (1/1)	Hsieh (12/13); Mertens (4/7)	Aoyama (1/2); Shibahara (1/2)	Krejčíková (2/3); Siniaková (2/10)	Fichman (1/1); Olmos (1/2)	Dabrowski (3/8); Stefani (1/6)	Stosur (10/10); Zhang (1/2)	not held	
	Doha	Dubai	Indian Wells	Miami	Madrid	Rome	Canada	Cincinnati	Guadalajara	Beijing
2022	Gauff (1/4); Pegula (1/3)	WTA 500	Xu (2/2); Yang (1/1)	Siegemund (1/1); Zvonareva (4/4)	Dabrowski (4/8); Olmos (2/2)	Kudermetova (2/3); Pavlyuchenkova (2/2)	Gauff (2/4); Pegula (2/3)	Kichenok (1/1); Ostapenko (2/2)	Hunter (1/5); Stefani (2/6)	not held
2023	WTA 500	Kudermetova (3/3); Samsonova (1/1)	Krejčíková (3/3); Siniaková (3/10)	Gauff (3/4); Pegula (3/3)	Azarenka (5/5); Haddad Maia (1/1)	Hunter (2/5); Mertens (5/7)	Aoyama (2/2); Shibahara (2/2)	Parks (1/1); Townsend (1/5)	Hunter (3/5); Mertens (6/7)	Bouzková (1/2); Sorribes Tormo (1/2)
	Doha	Dubai	Indian Wells	Miami	Madrid	Rome	Canada	Cincinnati	Beijing	Wuhan
2024	Schuurs (5/6); Stefani (3/6)	Hunter (4/5); Siniaková (4/10)	Hsieh (13/13); Mertens (7/7)	Kenin (2/2); Mattek-Sands (7/7)	Bucșa (1/1); Sorribes Tormo (2/2)	Errani (6/10); Paolini (1/5)	Dolehide (1/1); Krawczyk (1/1)	Muhammad (1/2); Routliffe (1/2)	Errani (7/10); Paolini (2/5)	Danilina (1/2); Khromacheva (1/1)
2025	Errani (8/10); Paolini (3/5)	Siniaková (5/10); Townsend (2/5)	Muhammad (2/2); Schuurs (6/6)	Andreeva (1/2); Shnaider (1/2)	Cîrstea (1/1); Kalinskaya (1/1)	Errani (9/10); Paolini (4/5)	Gauff (4/4); Kessler (1/1)	Dabrowski (5/8); Routliffe (2/2)	Errani (10/10); Paolini (5/5)	Hunter (5/5); Siniaková (6/10)
2026	Danilina (2/2); Krunić (1/1)	Dabrowski (6/8); Stefani (4/6)	Siniaková (7/10); Townsend (3/5)	Siniaková (8/10); Townsend (4/5)	Siniaková (9/10); Townsend (5/5)	Andreeva (2/2); Shnaider (2/2)	Siniaková (10/10); Zhang (2/2)	Bouzková (2/2); Nosková (1/1)	Dabrowski (7/8); Stefani (5/6)	Dabrowski (8/8); Stefani (6/6)

== Title leaders ==
- **CA** (Canadian Open)
- **CH** (Charleston Open)
- **CI** (Cincinnati Open)
- **CN** (China Open)
- **DU** (Dubai Championship)
- **FL** (Virginia Slims of Florida)
- **GD** (Guadalajara)
- **GE** (German Open)
- **IT** (Italian Open)
- **IW** (Indian Wells Open)
- **KC** (Kremlin Cup)
- **MA** (Madrid Open)
- **MI** (Miami Open)
- **PH** (Virginia Slims of Philadelphia)
- **PP** (Pan Pacific Open)
- **QA** (Qatar Open)
- **SD** (San Diego Open)
- **VC** (Virginia Slims of Chicago)
- **WU** (Wuhan Open)
- **ZU** (Zurich Open)

Active events	Defunct events

* Active players and most titles won per tournament are denoted in bold.

Titles	Player	QA	DU	IW	MI	MA	IT	CA	CI	WU	CN	VC	FL	CH	GE	SD	PH	KC	PP	GD	ZU	Years
26	Martina Hingis	-	-	3	4	1	**3***	2	1	**3***	**2***	-	-	1	-	-	-	1	2	-	3	1996–2017
24	Lisa Raymond	1	-	**5***	3	-	1	-	1	-	-	-	-	3	1	-	-	**2***	**5***	-	2	1999–2012
23	Natasha Zvereva	-	-	2	2	-	2	1	-	-	-	-	**2***	3	**4***	-	**1***	**2***	4	-	-	1991–1999
19	Rennae Stubbs	1	-	1	1	-	1	1	-	-	-	-	-	2	-	2	-	1	4	-	**5***	1992–2008
17	Cara Black	-	1	-	-	1	2	1	1	-	1	-	-	-	1	**3***	-	1	2	-	3	2001–2013
16	Arantxa Sánchez Vicario	-	-	-	5	-	2	2	-	-	-	-	-	**4***	1	-	-	1	-	-	1	1990–2001
14	Jana Novotná	-	-	-	**6***	-	1	**3***	-	-	-	-	-	2	2	-	-	-	-	-	-	1992–1999
14	Liezel Huber	1	**2***	1	1	1	1	2	1	-	-	-	-	-	1	1	-	1	1	-	-	2003–2012
13	**Hsieh Su-wei**^{*}	**2***	1	4	-	1	**3***	-	1	-	1	-	-	-	-	-	-	-	-	-	-	2009–2024
11	Virginia Ruano Pascual	-	-	2	-	-	2	1	-	-	-	-	-	**4***	1	1	-	-	-	-	-	1998–2005
10	Larisa Neiland	-	-	-	2	-	-	**3***	-	-	-	-	**2***	-	3	-	-	-	-	-	-	1991–1996
10	Samantha Stosur	-	-	2	2	-	-	-	1	-	-	-	-	1	1	-	-	1	2	-	-	2005–2021
10	**Sara Errani**^{*}	**2***	-	-	-	**2***	**3***	1	-	-	**2***	-	-	-	-	-	-	-	-	-	-	2012–2025
10	**Kateřina Siniaková**^{*}	-	**2***	2	1	**2***	-	2	-	1	-	-	-	-	-	-	-	-	-	-	-	2019–2026
9	Gigi Fernández	-	-	-	1	-	2	-	-	-	-	-	-	1	2	-	**1***	-	2	-	-	1993–1996
9	Lindsay Davenport	-	-	4	-	-	-	-	-	-	-	-	-	-	2	-	-	-	2	-	1	1997–2003
9	Paola Suárez	-	-	2	-	-	2	1	-	-	-	-	-	3	1	-	-	-	-	-	-	1998–2005
9	Martina Navratilova	-	-	-	-	-	1	**3***	-	-	-	**1***	-	1	-	-	-	-	1	-	2	1990–2006
9	Ai Sugiyama	-	-	1	2	-	1	2	-	-	-	-	-	1	-	-	-	1	-	-	1	2000–2008
9	Nadia Petrova	-	-	-	3	-	1	1	-	-	-	-	-	-	1	-	-	**2***	1	-	-	2003–2013
9	Katarina Srebotnik	-	-	1	2	-	1	2	-	-	1	-	-	1	-	-	-	1	-	-	-	2007–2014
9	Sania Mirza	-	-	2	1	-	1	-	1	1	**2***	-	-	-	-	-	-	-	1	-	-	2011–2016
9	Latisha Chan	1	-	1	-	1	2	-	2	1	1	-	-	-	-	-	-	-	-	-	-	2008–2017
8	Peng Shuai	1	-	1	-	-	**3***	-	1	-	**2***	-	-	-	-	-	-	-	-	-	-	2009–2014
8	Elena Vesnina	-	1	3	-	1	-	2	-	-	1	-	-	-	-	-	-	-	-	-	-	2008–2018
8	Barbora Strýcová	1	1	1	-	1	1	-	1	-	1	-	-	-	-	-	-	-	1	-	-	2010–2020
8	**Gabriela Dabrowski**^{*}	1	1	-	1	1	-	1	1	1	1	-	-	-	-	-	-	-	-	-	-	2017–2026
7	Ekaterina Makarova	-	1	1	-	1	-	2	1	-	1	-	-	-	-	-	-	-	-	-	-	2012–2018
7	Květa Peschke	1	-	1	-	-	1	-	1	-	1	-	-	-	-	-	-	1	-	-	1	2006–2020
7	**Elise Mertens**^{*}	-	-	3	1	-	1	-	-	1	-	-	-	-	-	-	-	-	-	1	-	2018–2024
7	**Bethanie Mattek-Sands**^{*}	-	-	1	2	-	-	1	-	1	**2***	-	-	-	-	-	-	-	-	-	-	2015–2024
**Titles**	**Player**	**QA**	**DU**	**IW**	**MI**	**MA**	**IT**	**CA**	**CI**	**WU**	**CN**	**VC**	**FL**	**CH**	**GE**	**SD**	**PH**	**KC**	**PP**	**GD**	**ZU**	**Years**

- Players with 7+ titles. Active players and records are denoted in **bold**.
- 166 champions in 311 events as of **2026 Indian Wells**.

== Career totals ==
- Active players in **bold**.

Doubles
No.	Titles
26	(Switzerland) Martina Hingis
24	(United States) Lisa Raymond
23	(Belarus) Natasha Zvereva
19	(Australia) Rennae Stubbs
17	(Zimbabwe) Cara Black
16	(Spain) Arantxa Sánchez Vicario
14	(Czechoslovakia) Jana Novotná
14	(United States) Liezel Huber
13	(Chinese Taipei) **Hsieh Su-wei**
11	(Spain) Virginia Ruano Pascual

No.	Finals
37	Lisa Raymond
36	Natasha Zvereva
35	Martina Hingis
32	Cara Black
31	Rennae Stubbs
25	Liezel Huber
24	Arantxa Sánchez Vicario
22	Gigi Fernández
22	Virginia Ruano Pascual
21	Katarina Srebotnik

No.	Semifinals
63	Rennae Stubbs
63	Lisa Raymond
51	Cara Black
47	Liezel Huber
43	Natasha Zvereva
42	Martina Hingis
39	Arantxa Sánchez Vicario
38	Katarina Srebotnik
35	Larisa Neiland
33	Nadia Petrova

No.	Quarterfinals
88	Rennae Stubbs
85	Lisa Raymond
70	Liezel Huber
69	Cara Black
61	Ai Sugiyama
61	Katarina Srebotnik
58	Natasha Zvereva
54	Květa Peschke
52	Sania Mirza
51	Nadia Petrova

No.	Match wins
247	Lisa Raymond
226	Rennae Stubbs
198	Cara Black
187	Liezel Huber
185	Martina Hingis
176	Katarina Srebotnik
175	Natasha Zvereva
155	Sania Mirza
151	Květa Peschke
149	Ai Sugiyama

%	W–L	Match record
84.5	109–20	Jana Novotná
82.6	185–39	Martina Hingis
80.3	175–43	Natasha Zvereva
78.9	97–26	Gigi Fernández
76.7	145–44	Arantxa Sánchez Vicario
73.0	89–33	Lindsay Davenport
72.2	83–32	Martina Navratilova
71.3	124–50	Larisa Neiland
69.4	136–60	Nadia Petrova
69.3	226–100	Rennae Stubbs

- Statistics correct as of **2024 Rome**. To avoid double counting, they should be updated at the conclusion of a tournament or when the player's participation has ended.

== Season records ==
No.	Titles	Year(s)	
6	Latisha Chan; Martina Hingis	2017	
4	Natasha Zvereva	3	1991, 94, 97
4	Lisa Raymond	3	2002, 06–07
4	Samantha Stosur	2	2006–07
4	Gigi Fernández	1994	
4	Arantxa Sánchez Vicario	1996	
4	Rennae Stubbs	2002	
4	Martina Hingis; Sania Mirza	2015	
4	Bethanie Mattek-Sands	2016	
4	Kateřina Siniaková	2026	

No.	Finals	Year(s)	
6	Jana Novotná	1999	
6	Virginia Ruano Pascual; Paola Suárez	2004	
6	Latisha Chan; Martina Hingis	2017	
6	Kateřina Siniaková	2026	
5	Natasha Zvereva	2	1994, 97
5	Gigi Fernández	1994	
5	Lisa Raymond	2007	
5	Cara Black; Liezel Huber	2008	
5	Gisela Dulko; Flavia Pennetta	2010	
5	Martina Hingis; Sania Mirza	2015	

== Consecutive records ==
No.	Consecutive titles	Years	
5	Lisa Raymond	2001–02	
4	Larisa Neiland	1991–92	
4	Rennae Stubbs	2002	
4	Lisa Raymond; Samantha Stosur	2006	
3	Natasha Zvereva	2	1991–92, 96–97
3	Arantxa Sánchez Vicario	1996	
3	Lisa Raymond; Samantha Stosur	2007	
3	Latisha Chan; Martina Hingis	2017	
3	Kateřina Siniaková; Taylor Townsend	2026	

No.	Consecutive finals	Years	
5	Larisa Neiland	1991–92	
5	Gigi Fernández; Natasha Zvereva	1994–95	
5	Lisa Raymond	2001–02	
4	Natasha Zvereva	3	1994, 96–98
4	Gigi Fernández	1994	
4	Jana Novotná	1999	
4	Rennae Stubbs	2002	
4	Lisa Raymond; Samantha Stosur	2006	
4	Demi Schuurs	2018	

== Tournament records ==
=== Most titles per tournament ===
Active
Tournament	No.	Player	Years
Doha	2	Hsieh Su-wei	2014–20
Doha	2	Sara Errani	2013–25
Dubai	2	Liezel Huber	2009–11
Dubai	2	María José Martínez Sánchez	2010–11
Dubai	2	Kateřina Siniaková	2024–25
Indian Wells	5	Lisa Raymond	2002–12
Miami	6	Jana Novotná	1990–99
Madrid	2	Sara Errani; Roberta Vinci	2012–14
Madrid	2	Victoria Azarenka	2011–23
Madrid	2	Kateřina Siniaková	2021–26
Rome	3	Monica Seles	1990–92
Rome	3	Peng Shuai	2009–13
Rome	3	Martina Hingis	1999–2017
Rome	3	Hsieh Su-wei	2009–20
Rome	3	Sara Errani	2012–25
Canada	3	Larisa Neiland	1991–96
Canada	3	Jana Novotná	1993–99
Canada	3	Martina Navratilova	2003–06
Cincinnati	3	Lucie Hradecká	2012–19
Beijing	2	Peng Shuai	2009–14
Beijing	2	Sania Mirza	2013–15
Beijing	2	Martina Hingis	2015–17
Beijing	2	Andrea Hlaváčková	2014–18
Beijing	2	Bethanie Mattek-Sands	2016–19
Beijing	2	Sara Errani; Jasmine Paolini	2024–25
Wuhan	3	Martina Hingis	2014–17

Discontinued
Tournament	No.	Player	Years
Chicago (Note: Chicago was held only once.)	1	Martina Navratilova; Anne Smith	1990
Boca Raton	2	Larisa Neiland; Natasha Zvereva	1991–92
Charleston	4	Arantxa Sánchez Vicario	1990–96
Charleston	4	Virginia Ruano Pascual	2000–05
Berlin	4	Natasha Zvereva	1991–98
San Diego	3	Cara Black	2004–07
Philadelphia	1	Katrina Adams; Manon Bollegraf	1993
Philadelphia	1	Gigi Fernández; Natasha Zvereva	1994
Philadelphia	1	Lori McNeil; Helena Suková	1995
Moscow	2	Natasha Zvereva	1997–98
Moscow	2	Lisa Raymond	1999–2005
Moscow	2	Nadia Petrova	2003–08
Tokyo	5	Lisa Raymond	2001–11
Guadalajara	2	Storm Hunter	2022–23
Zürich	5	Rennae Stubbs	1999–2007

=== Tournaments won with no sets dropped ===
No.	Player	Events
10	Natasha Zvereva	Charleston (1991, 1992, 1993), Tokyo (1995, 1997, 1999), Boca Raton (1992), Indian Wells (1997), Moscow (1997, 1998)
9	Martina Hingis	Tokyo (1998, 2000), Zurich (2000), Moscow (2001), Miami (2015), Indian Wells (1999, 2015, 2017), Wuhan (2015)
6	Arantxa Sánchez Vicario	Charleston (1990, 1992, 1994), Rome (1993), Canada (1996), Moscow (1997)
6	Sania Mirza	Indian Wells (2011, 2015), Beijing (2013), Miami (2015), Wuhan (2015), Cincinnati (2016)
5	Hsieh Su-wei	Beijing (2009), Doha (2014), Dubai (2019), Rome (2020), Indian Wells (2024)
4	Lisa Raymond	Indian Wells (2002, 2006, 2007), Moscow (1999)
4	Cara Black	Rome (2001), Canada (2008), Dubai (2009), Beijing (2013)
4	Kateřina Siniaková	Dubai (2024), Wuhan (2025), Indian Wells (2026), Canada (2026)
3	Lindsay Davenport	Tokyo (1997, 1999), Indian Wells (1997)
3	Anna Kournikova	Indian Wells (1999), Zurich (2000), Moscow (2001)
3	Nadia Petrova	Moscow (2003, 2008), Tokyo (2008)
3	Peng Shuai	Beijing (2009), Doha (2014), Beijing (2014)
3	Bethanie Mattek-Sands; Lucie Šafářová	Canada (2015), Miami (2016), Wuhan (2016)
3	Elena Vesnina	Indian Wells (2011), Canada (2016, 2017)
3	Barbora Strýcová	Cincinnati (2016), Dubai (2019), Rome (2020)
2	Larisa Neiland	Boca Raton (1992), Canada (1996)
2	Gigi Fernández	Charleston (1993), Tokyo (1995)
2	Mary Pierce	Moscow (1998), Tokyo (2000)
2	Rennae Stubbs	Moscow (1999), Indian Wells (2002)
2	Elena Likhovtseva	Rome (2001), Tokyo (2005)
2	Samantha Stosur	Indian Wells (2006, 2007)
2	Liezel Huber	Canada (2008), Dubai (2009)
2	Katarina Srebotnik	Moscow (2008), Rome (2014)
2	Latisha Chan	Rome (2008), Indian Wells (2017)
2	Kristina Mladenovic	Rome (2015), Madrid (2016)
2	Ekaterina Makarova	Canada (2016, 2017)
2	Storm Hunter	Dubai (2024), Wuhan (2025)
2	Luisa Stefani	Doha (2024), Wuhan (2026)

No.	Player	Events
1	Martina Navratilova	Charleston (1990)
1	Claudia Kohde-Kilsch	Charleston (1991)
1	Monica Seles; Helena Suková	Rome (1992)
1	Jana Novotná	Rome (1993)
1	Lori McNeil	Charleston (1994)
1	Chanda Rubin; Brenda Schultz-McCarthy	Indian Wells (1996)
1	Mirjana Lučić	Tokyo (1998)
1	Alexandra Fusai; Nathalie Tauziat	Berlin (1999)
1	Elena Bovina; Justine Henin	Zurich (2002)
1	Virginia Ruano Pascual; Paola Suárez	Charleston (2003)
1	Meghann Shaughnessy	Moscow (2003)
1	Janette Husárová	Tokyo (2005)
1	Yan Zi; Zheng Jie	Berlin (2006)
1	Nathalie Dechy; Mara Santangelo	Rome (2007)
1	Chuang Chia-jung	Rome (2008)
1	Vania King	Tokyo (2008)
1	Alisa Kleybanova; Francesca Schiavone	Tokyo (2009)
1	Serena Williams; Venus Williams	Madrid (2010)
1	Victoria Azarenka; Maria Kirilenko	Cincinnati (2011)
1	Sara Errani; Roberta Vinci	Rome (2012)
1	Raquel Kops-Jones; Abigail Spears	Tokyo (2012)
1	Květa Peschke	Rome (2014)
1	Andrea Hlaváčková	Beijing (2014)
1	Tímea Babos	Rome (2015)
1	Lucie Hradecká; Andreja Klepač	Cincinnati (2019)
1	Demi Schuurs	Doha (2024)
1	Elise Mertens	Indian Wells (2024)
1	Taylor Townsend	Indian Wells (2026)
1	Shuai Zhang	Canada (2026)
1	Gabriela Dabrowski	Wuhan (2026)

=== Different titles won ===
Doubles
No.	Player	Events
12	Martina Hingis	Indian Wells (hard), Miami (hard), Madrid (clay), Rome (clay), Charleston (green clay), Cincinnati (hard), Canada (hard), Beijing (hard), Moscow (carpet indoors), Tokyo (carpet indoors), Wuhan (hard), Zurich (carpet indoors)
12	Liezel Huber	Doha (hard), Dubai (hard), Indian Wells (hard), Miami (hard), Madrid (clay), Rome (clay), Cincinnati (hard), Canada (hard), San Diego (hard), Berlin (clay), Moscow (carpet indoors), Tokyo (carpet indoors)
11	Cara Black	Dubai (hard), Madrid (clay), Rome (clay), Cincinnati (hard), Canada (hard), Beijing (hard), San Diego (hard), Berlin (clay), Moscow (carpet indoors), Tokyo (carpet indoors), Zurich (carpet indoors)
10	Lisa Raymond	Doha (hard), Indian Wells (hard), Miami (hard), Berlin (clay), Rome (clay), Charleston (green clay), Cincinnati (hard), Moscow (carpet indoors), Tokyo (carpet indoors), Zurich (carpet indoors)
10	Natasha Zvereva	Indian Wells (hard), Miami (hard), Rome (clay), Charleston (green clay), Berlin (clay), Canada (hard), Florida (hard), Philadelphia (carpet indoors), Moscow (carpet indoors), Tokyo (carpet indoors)
10	Rennae Stubbs	Doha (hard), Indian Wells (hard), Miami (hard), Rome (clay), Charleston (green clay), Canada (hard), San Diego (hard), Moscow (carpet indoors), Tokyo (carpet indoors), Zurich (carpet indoors)

== Calendar title combinations ==
- **Back-to-back** tournament titles.
- Currently active combinations in **bold.**

=== Four consecutive ===
Combination	Winner	Year
Tokyo–Indian Wells—Miami—Charleston (Note: Tokyo and Charleston were held as the 1st and the 4th events of the season, respectively, until 2007.) "Season first quadruple"	Lisa Raymond; Rennae Stubbs	2002
Tokyo–Indian Wells—Miami—Charleston "Season first quadruple"	Lisa Raymond; Samantha Stosur	2006

=== Three consecutive ===
Combination	Winner	Year
Tokyo–Indian Wells—Miami (Note: Until 2007, Tokyo was held as the 1st event.) "Season first triple"	Natasha Zvereva	1997
Tokyo–Indian Wells—Miami "Season first triple"	Lisa Raymond; Samantha Stosur	2007

=== Two consecutive ===
Combination	Winner	Year(s)	
Indian Wells—Miami "Sunshine double"	Lisa Raymond	3	2002, 06–07
Indian Wells—Miami "Sunshine double"	Martina Hingis	2	1999, 2015
Indian Wells—Miami "Sunshine double"	Samantha Stosur	2	2006–07
Indian Wells—Miami "Sunshine double"	Natasha Zvereva	1997	
Indian Wells—Miami "Sunshine double"	Rennae Stubbs	2002	
Indian Wells—Miami "Sunshine double"	Sania Mirza	2015	
Indian Wells—Miami "Sunshine double"	Bethanie Mattek-Sands	2016	
Indian Wells—Miami "Sunshine double"	Elise Mertens; Aryna Sabalenka	2019	
Indian Wells—Miami "Sunshine double"	Kateřina Siniaková; Taylor Townsend	2026	
Madrid—Rome "Clay double"	Sara Errani; Roberta Vinci	2012	
Madrid—Rome "Clay double"	Latisha Chan; Martina Hingis	2017	
Wuhan–Beijing "Fall double"	Martina Hingis	2	2015, 17
Wuhan–Beijing "Fall double"	Sania Mirza	2015	
Wuhan–Beijing "Fall double"	Bethanie Mattek-Sands; Lucie Šafářová	2016	
Wuhan–Beijing "Fall double"	Latisha Chan	2017	
Wuhan–Beijing "Fall double"	Gabriela Dabrowski; Luisa Stefani	2026	

== Titles won by decade ==
as of 2025 Wuhan.

=== 1990s ===
23	Zvereva

14	Novotna, Vicario

10	Savchenko-Neiland

9	Fernandez, Hingis

6	Davenport

5	Bollegraf, Navratilova, Sukova

3	Arendt, McNeil, Seles, Stubbs

2	Fernandez, Garrison-Jackson, Kournikova, McGrath, Pierce, Raymond, Sabatini, Schultz-McCarthy

1	Adams, Basuki, Capriati, Coetzer, Fusai, Gorrochategui, Kelesi, Kohde-Kilsch, Likhovtseva, Lučić, Martinez, Nagelsen, Provis, Reinach, Ruano Pascual, Rubin, Shriver, Smith, Smylie, Spirlea, Suarez, Tarabini, Tauziat, Vis, S. Williams, V. Williams

=== 2000s ===
18	Raymond

16	Stubbs

15	Black

10	Pascual

9	Huber, Stosur, Sugiyama

8	Suarez

7	Petrova

5	Shaughnessy

4	Hingis, Kuznetsova, Navratilova, Srebotnik

3	Davenport, Husarova, Likhovtseva, Martinez, Peschke, Zvonareva

2	Bovina, Dementieva, Halard-Decugis, Kournikova, Peng, Sanchez Vicario, Schiavone, Tauziat, Yan, Zheng

1	Arendt, Azarenka, Callens, Chan, Chuang, Clijsters, Dechy, Gronefeld, Hantuchova, Henin, Hsieh, King, Kleybanova, Llagostera Vives, Maleeva, Martinez Sanchez, Mauresmo, Molik, Morariu, Myskina, Pierce, Po-Messerli, Pratt, Safina, Santangelo, Shinobu, Vesnina

=== 2010s ===
13	Hingis

9	Mirza

8	L. Chan

7	Hsieh, Makarova, Vesnina

6	Mattek-Sands, Peng, Strycova

5	Errani, Šafářová, Srebotnik, Vinci

4	Barty, Huber, Mladenovic, Pennetta, Raymond

3	Azarenka, Dulko, Hlaváčková, Hradecka, Kirilenko, Mertens, Peschke, Schuurs

2	Babos, Black, H. Chan, Dabrowski, Kops-Jones, Martinez Sanchez, Petrova, Sabalenka, Shvedova, Spears, Vandeweghe

1	Benešová, Chuang, Dellacqua, Duan, Garcia, Govortsova, Hantuchova, Janković, Jans-Ignacik, Kenin, King, Klepač, Krejčíková, Kudermetova, Lisicki, Llagostera Vives, Ostapenko, Pavlyuchenkova, Radwanska, Siniaková, Stosur, S. Williams, V. Williams, Zheng

=== 2020s ===
9	Siniaková

6	Dabrowski, Stefani

5	Errani, Hunter, Paolini, Townsend

4	Gauff, Hsieh, Mertens

3	Pegula, Schuurs

2	Aoyama, Bouzková, Danilina, Krejčíková, Kudermetova, Muhammad, Olmos, Routliffe, Shibahara, Sorribes Tormo, Strýcová

1	Andreeva, Azarenka, Bucsa, Cîrstea, Dolehide, Fichman, Guarachi, Haddad Maia, Jurak, Kalinskaya, Kenin, Kessler, Khromacheva, Kichenok, Krawczyk, Krunić, Mattek-Sands, Nosková, Ostapenko, Parks, Pavlyuchenkova, Peschke, Samsonova, Shnaider, Siegemund, Yang, Zhang, Zvonareva

== Titles won by country ==
Note: Titles, won by a team of players from same country, count as one title, not two.

as of 2025 Wuhan.

100	United States (35 players)

48	Czech Republic (11 players)

43	Australia (8 players)

41	Russia (15 players)

33	Spain (7 players)

30	Belarus (4 players)

26	Switzerland (1 player)

23	Chinese Taipei (4 players)

17	Zimbabwe (1 player)

16	Argentina (5 players)

14	China (7 players), France (7 players), Italy (6 players)

13	Netherlands (4 players)

12	Latvia (2 players)

11	Japan (4 players)

10	Belgium (4 players), Slovenia (2 players)

9	India (1 player)

7	Canada (3 players)

5	Slovakia (2 players)

4	Brazil (2 players), Germany (4 players), Serbia (2 players), South Africa (3 players)

2	Croatia (2 players), Hungary (1 player), Kazakhstan (1 player), Mexico (1 player), New Zealand (1 player), Poland (2 players)

1	Chile, Romania, Ukraine

== See also ==
WTA Tour

- WTA 1000
- WTA 1000 Series singles records and statistics
- WTA Premier Mandatory and Premier 5
- WTA Tier I tournaments

ATP Tour

- ATP Tour Masters 1000
- Tennis Masters Series singles records and statistics
- Tennis Masters Series doubles records and statistics
