= 1993 WTA Tier I Series =

Women's professional tennis tour

Details
- Duration: February 4 – November 14
- Edition: 4th
- Tournaments: 8

Achievements (singles)
- Most titles: (Germany) Steffi Graf (3)
- Most finals: (Germany) Steffi Graf (5)

The WTA Tier I events are part of the elite tour for professional women's tennis organised by the WTA called the WTA Tour.

== Tournaments ==
| Tournament | Country | Location | Surface | Date | Prize money |
|---|---|---|---|---|---|
| Toray Pan Pacific Open | Japan | Tokyo | Carpet (i) | Feb 1–7 | $750,000 |
| Lipton Championships | United States | Key Biscayne | Hard | Mar 8–21 | $900,000 |
| Family Circle Magazine Cup | United States | Hilton Head Island | Clay (green) | Mar 29 – Apr 4 | $750,000 |
| Campionati Internazionali d'Italia | Italy | Rome | Clay | May 3–9 | $750,000 |
| German Open | Germany | Berlin | Clay | May 10–16 | $750,000 |
| Matidee LTD, International | Canada | Toronto | Hard | Aug 16–22 | $750,000 |
| Barilla Indoors | Switzerland | Zürich | Carpet (i) | Oct 4–10 | $750,000 |
| Virginia Slims of Philadelphia | United States | Philadelphia | Supreme (i) | Nov 8–14 | $750,000 |

== Results ==
* First-time champion

| Tournament | Singles champions | Runners-up | Score | Doubles champions | Runners-up | Score |
|---|---|---|---|---|---|---|
| Tokyo Singles – Doubles | (United States) Martina Navratilova | (Latvia) Larisa Savchenko-Neiland | 6–2, 6–2 | (United States) Martina Navratilova (Czech Republic) Helena Suková | (United States) Lori McNeil (Australia) Rennae Stubbs | 6–4, 6–3 |
| Miami Singles – Doubles | (Spain) Arantxa Sánchez Vicario | (Germany) Steffi Graf | 6–4, 3–6, 6–3 | (Latvia) Larisa Neiland (Czech Republic) Jana Novotná | (Canada) Jill Hetherington (United States) Kathy Rinaldi | 6–2, 7–5 |
| Hilton Head Singles – Doubles | (Germany) Steffi Graf | (Spain) Arantxa Sánchez Vicario | 7–6^{(10–8)}, 6–1 | (United States) Gigi Fernández* | (United States) Katrina Adams (Netherlands) Manon Bollegraf | 6–3, 6–1 |
| Hilton Head Singles – Doubles | (Germany) Steffi Graf | (Spain) Arantxa Sánchez Vicario | 7–6^{(10–8)}, 6–1 | (Belarus) Natasha Zvereva | (United States) Katrina Adams (Netherlands) Manon Bollegraf | 6–3, 6–1 |
| Rome Singles – Doubles | (Spain) Conchita Martínez* | (Argentina) Gabriela Sabatini | 7–5, 6–1 | (Czech Republic) Jana Novotná (Spain) Arantxa Sánchez Vicario | (United States) Mary Joe Fernández (United States) Zina Garrison-Jackson | 6–4, 6–2 |
| Berlin Singles – Doubles | (Germany) Steffi Graf | (Argentina) Gabriela Sabatini | 7–6^{(7–3)}, 2–6, 6–4 | (United States) Gigi Fernández (Belarus) Natasha Zvereva | (United States) Debbie Graham (Netherlands) Brenda Schultz | 6–1, 6–3 |
| Toronto Singles – Doubles | (Germany) Steffi Graf | (United States) Jennifer Capriati | 6–1, 0–6, 6–3 | (Latvia) Larisa Neiland (Czech Republic) Jana Novotná | (Spain) Arantxa Sánchez Vicario (Czech Republic) Helena Suková | 6–1, 6–2 |
| Zürich Singles – Doubles | (Switzerland) Manuela Maleeva* | (United States) Martina Navratilova | 6–3, 7–6^{(7–1)} | (United States) Zina Garrison-Jackson (United States) Martina Navratilova | (United States) Gigi Fernández (Belarus) Natasha Zvereva | 6–3, 5–7, 6–3 |
| Philadelphia Singles – Doubles | (Spain) Conchita Martínez | (Germany) Steffi Graf | 6–3, 6–3 | (United States) Katrina Adams* (Netherlands) Manon Bollegraf* | (Spain) Conchita Martínez (Latvia) Larisa Neiland | 6–2, 4–6, 7–6^{(9–7)} |

== See also ==
- WTA Tier I events
- 1993 WTA Tour
- 1993 ATP Championship Series, Single Week
- 1993 ATP Tour
