= 1994 Toray Pan Pacific Open – Singles =

Singles
- 1994 Toray Pan Pacific Open

Final
- Champion: (Germany) Steffi Graf
- Runner-up: (United States) Martina Navratilova
- Score: 6–2, 6–4

Details
- Draw: 32 (4 Q / 2 WC )
- Seeds: 8

Events
Singles	Doubles
← 1993 ·	Pan Pacific Open	· 1995 →

Steffi Graf defeated the defending champion Martina Navratilova in the final, 6–2, 6–4 to win the singles tennis title at the 1994 Pan Pacific Open.

== Seeds ==
A champion seed is indicated in bold text while text in italics indicates the round in which that seed was eliminated.

1. (Germany) **Steffi Graf (champion)**
2. (United States) Martina Navratilova (final)
3. (Argentina) Gabriela Sabatini (second round)
4. (Czech Republic) Jana Novotná (second round)
5. (Japan) Kimiko Date (first round)
6. (Switzerland) Manuela Maleeva-Fragniere (semifinals)
7. (Czech Republic) Helena Suková (first round)
8. (France) Nathalie Tauziat (second round)

== Draw ==
=== Key ===
- Q = Qualifier
- WC = Wild card
- LL = Lucky loser
- Alt = Alternate
- SE = Special exempt
- PR = Protected ranking
- ITF = ITF entry
- JE = Junior exempt
- w/o = Walkover
- r = Retired
- d = Defaulted
- SR = Special ranking

First round
1	(Germany) **S Graf**	**6**	**6**
(Croatia) I Majoli	1	0
(United Kingdom) **C Wood**	**6**	1	**7**
(Chinese Taipei) S-T Wang	1	**6**	5
WC	(Japan) R Hiraki	3	5
Q	(Canada) **J Nejedly**	**6**	**7**
(United States) **C Kuhlman**	4	**7**	**7**
5	(Japan) K Date	**6**	5	5
4	(Czech Republic) **J Novotná**	**6**	**6**
Q	(Japan) A Sugiyama	3	4
(Japan) Y Kamio	2	3
(Netherlands) **K Boogert**	**6**	**6**
(Australia) **K Radford**	**7**	3	**6**
(France) K Quentrec	5	**6**	1
(United States) **P Shriver**	**6**	3	**6**
7	(Czech Republic) H Suková	1	**6**	3
6	(Switzerland) **M Maleeva-Fragniere**	**6**	**6**
(Belgium) D Monami	2	3
(Australia) M Jaggard-Lai	0	3
WC	(China) **F Li**	**6**	**6**
(Australia) N Provis	5	4
(Germany) **M Kochta**	**7**	**6**
Q	(Japan) K Nagatsuka	4	4
3	(Argentina) **G Sabatini**	**6**	**6**
8	(France) **N Tauziat**	**6**	**7**
(United States) L McNeil	2	5
(Latvia) **L Neiland**	**7**	**6**
(Netherlands) N Muns-Jagerman	6	3
(United States) K Rinaldi-Stunkel	3	3
Q	(Netherlands) **M Bollegraf**	**6**	**6**
(Japan) M Endo	1	3
2	(United States) **M Navratilova**	**6**	**6**

Second round
1	(Germany) **S Graf**	**6**	**6**
(United Kingdom) C Wood	3	4
Q	(Canada) **J Nejedly**	2	**6**	**6**
(United States) C Kuhlman	**6**	3	2
4	(Czech Republic) J Novotná	**6**	4	1
(Netherlands) **K Boogert**	4	**6**	**6**
(Australia) K Radford	2	2
(United States) **P Shriver**	**6**	**6**
6	(Switzerland) **M Maleeva-Fragniere**	**6**	**6**
WC	(China) F Li	2	2
(Germany) **M Kochta**	**7**	**7**
3	(Argentina) G Sabatini	6	5
8	(France) N Tauziat	6	3
(Latvia) **L Neiland**	**7**	**6**
Q	(Netherlands) M Bollegraf	**7**	2	1
2	(United States) **M Navratilova**	6	**6**	**6**

Quarterfinals
1	(Germany) **S Graf**	**6**	**6**
Q	(Canada) J Nejedly	1	1
(Netherlands) **K Boogert**	**6**	**6**
(United States) P Shriver	1	4
6	(Switzerland) **M Maleeva-Fragniere**	**6**	**6**
(Germany) M Kochta	4	4
(Latvia) L Neiland	4	4
2	(United States) **M Navratilova**	**6**	**6**

Semifinals
1	(Germany) **S Graf**	**6**	**6**
(Netherlands) K Boogert	2	2
6	(Switzerland) M Maleeva-Fragniere	2	3
2	(United States) **M Navratilova**	**6**	**6**

Final
1	(Germany) **Steffi Graf**	**6**	**6**
2	(United States) Martina Navratilova	2	4
