= 1993 Toray Pan Pacific Open =

- Date: February 2–7
- Edition: 10th
- Category: Tier I
- Surface: Carpet / indoor
- Location: Yokohama, Japan
- Venue: Yokohama Arena

Champions

Singles
- (United States) Martina Navratilova

Doubles
- (United States) Martina Navratilova / (Czech Republic) Helena Suková
← 1992 ·	Pan Pacific Open	· 1994 →

The 1993 Toray Pan Pacific Open was a women's tennis tournament played on indoor carpet courts. It was the 10th edition of the Toray Pan Pacific Open, and was part of the Tier I Series of the 1993 WTA Tour. It took place at the Yokohama Arena in Yokohama, Japan, from February 2 through February 7, 1993. Third-seeded Martina Navratilova won the singles title.

== Finals ==
=== Singles ===
(United States) Martina Navratilova defeated (Latvia) Larisa Savchenko-Neiland 6–2, 6–2

=== Doubles ===
(United States) Lisa Raymond / (Czech Republic) Helena Suková defeated (United States) Lori McNeil / (Australia) Rennae Stubbs 6–4, 6–3
