= 1992 Italian Open – Women's doubles =

Women's doubles
- 1992 Italian Open

Final
- Champions: (Federal Republic of Yugoslavia) Monica Seles (Czechoslovakia) Helena Suková
- Runners-up: (Bulgaria) Katerina Maleeva (Germany) Barbara Rittner
- Score: 6–1, 6–2

Details
- Draw: 28 (2WC/1Q)
- Seeds: 8

Events
Singles	men	women
Doubles	men	women
← 1991 ·	Italian Open	· 1993 →

Jennifer Capriati and Monica Seles were the defending champions, but competed this year with different partners.

Capriati teamed up with Mary Joe Fernández and lost in the second round to Florencia Labat and Sandrine Testud.

Seles teamed up with Helena Suková and successfully defended her title, by defeating Katerina Maleeva and Barbara Rittner 6–1, 6–2 in the final.

== Seeds ==
The first four seeds received a bye to the second round.

1. (United States) Pam Shriver / (Commonwealth of Independent States) Natasha Zvereva (semifinals)
2. (Australia) Rachel McQuillan / (Australia) Nicole Provis (semifinals)
3. (United States) Jennifer Capriati / (United States) Mary Joe Fernández (second round)
4. (Commonwealth of Independent States) Leila Meskhi / (Argentina) Mercedes Paz (second round)
5. (France) Isabelle Demongeot / (France) Nathalie Tauziat (quarterfinals)
6. (United States) Sandy Collins / (Netherlands) Brenda Schultz (quarterfinals)
7. (France) Mary Pierce / (Czechoslovakia) Radka Zrubáková (quarterfinals)
8. (Bulgaria) Katerina Maleeva / (Germany) Barbara Rittner (final)

== Draw ==
=== Key ===
- Q = Qualifier
- WC = Wild card
- LL = Lucky loser
- Alt = Alternate
- ITF = ITF entry
- PR = Protected ranking
- SR = Special ranking
- SE = Special exempt
- JE = Junior exempt
- JR = Junior Accelerator Programme entrant
- CO = College Accelerator Programme entrant
- NG = Next Gen Accelerator Program entrant
- w/o = Walkover
- r = Retired
- d = Defaulted

=== Finals ===
Semifinals
1	(United States) Pam Shriver (Commonwealth of Independent States) Natasha Zvereva	1	2
WC	(Federal Republic of Yugoslavia) Monica Seles (Czechoslovakia) Helena Suková	6	6
8	(Bulgaria) Katerina Maleeva (Germany) Barbara Rittner	6	3	6
2	(Australia) Rachel McQuillan (Australia) Nicole Provis	3	6	1

Final
WC	(Federal Republic of Yugoslavia) Monica Seles (Czechoslovakia) Helena Suková	6	6
8	(Bulgaria) Katerina Maleeva (Germany) Barbara Rittner	1	2

=== Top half ===
First round
(South Africa) A Coetzer (Argentina) I Gorrochategui	6	6
Q	(Austria) S Dopfer (Germany) V Martinek	2	3
(Australia) J Hodder (Sweden) M Lindström	6	6
(United States) D Faber (Japan) A Kijimuta	4	2
(Spain) A Segura (Austria) H Sprung	2	3
6	(United States) S Collins (Netherlands) B Schultz	6	6
WC	(Federal Republic of Yugoslavia) M Seles (Czechoslovakia) H Suková	6	6
(Italy) S Farina (Italy) L Ferrando	1	3
WC	(Italy) F Bonsignori (Italy) F Romanò	2	6	3
(United States) C Cunningham (United States) D Graham	6	2	6
(Greece) J Apostoli (Romania) I Spîrlea	4	6^{4}
7	(France) M Pierce (Czechoslovakia) R Zrubáková	6	7^{7}

Second round
1	(United States) P Shriver (Commonwealth of Independent States) N Zvereva	6	6
(South Africa) A Coetzer (Argentina) I Gorrochategui	4	0
(Australia) J Hodder (Sweden) M Lindström	1	3
6	(United States) S Collins (Netherlands) B Schultz	6	6
4	(Commonwealth of Independent States) L Meskhi (Argentina) M Paz	6^{5}	0
WC	(Federal Republic of Yugoslavia) M Seles (Czechoslovakia) H Suková	7^{7}	6
(United States) C Cunningham (United States) D Graham	3	0
7	(France) M Pierce (Czechoslovakia) R Zrubáková	6	6

Quarterfinals
1	(United States) P Shriver (Commonwealth of Independent States) N Zvereva	6	7^{8}
6	(United States) S Collins (Netherlands) B Schultz	3	6^{6}
WC	(Federal Republic of Yugoslavia) M Seles (Czechoslovakia) H Suková	6	6
7	(France) M Pierce (Czechoslovakia) R Zrubáková	3	2

Semifinals
1	(United States) P Shriver (Commonwealth of Independent States) N Zvereva	1	2
WC	(Federal Republic of Yugoslavia) M Seles (Czechoslovakia) H Suková	6	6

=== Bottom half ===
First round
8	(Bulgaria) K Maleeva (Germany) B Rittner	6	6
(South Africa) R Gaddie (South Africa) Tori Gaddie	1	2
(Argentina) B Fulco-Villella (Czechoslovakia) R Rajchrtová	7	4	6
(Italy) N Baudone (Italy) K Piccolini	5	6	2
(United States) P O'Reilly (United States) Terri O'Reilly	3	6	4
(Argentina) F Labat (France) S Testud	6	2	6
5	(France) I Demongeot (France) N Tauziat	7^{7}	6
(Italy) L Garrone (Italy) L Golarsa	6^{4}	1
(Italy) S Cecchini (Peru) L Gildemeister	6	6
(Germany) A Huber (Germany) C Kohde-Kilsch	2	3
(Canada) P Hy (Greece) C Papadáki	6	6
(Czechoslovakia) M Kratochvílová (Italy) C Salvi	3	2

Second round
8	(Bulgaria) K Maleeva (Germany) B Rittner	7	6
(Argentina) B Fulco-Villella (Czechoslovakia) R Rajchrtová	5	4
(Argentina) F Labat (France) S Testud	6	6
3	(United States) J Capriati (United States) MJ Fernández	3	4
5	(France) I Demongeot (France) N Tauziat	6	3	6
(Italy) S Cecchini (Peru) L Gildemeister	3	6	1
(Canada) P Hy (Greece) C Papadáki	4	0
2	(Australia) R McQuillan (Australia) N Provis	6	6

Quarterfinals
8	(Bulgaria) K Maleeva (Germany) B Rittner	7^{9}	6
(Argentina) F Labat (France) S Testud	6^{7}	4
5	(France) I Demongeot (France) N Tauziat	1	0
2	(Australia) R McQuillan (Australia) N Provis	6	6

Semifinals
8	(Bulgaria) K Maleeva (Germany) B Rittner	6	3	6
2	(Australia) R McQuillan (Australia) N Provis	3	6	1
