= 1992 Toray Pan Pacific Open – Singles =

Singles
- 1992 Toray Pan Pacific Open

Final
- Champion: (Argentina) Gabriela Sabatini
- Runner-up: (United States) Martina Navratilova
- Score: 6–2, 4–6, 6–2

Details
- Draw: 28 (2WC/4Q/1LL)
- Seeds: 8

Events
Singles	Doubles
← 1991 ·	Pan Pacific Open	· 1993 →

Gabriela Sabatini successfully defended her title by defeating Martina Navratilova 6–2, 4–6, 6–2 in the final.

== Seeds ==
The first four seeds received a bye into the second round.

1. (Argentina) Gabriela Sabatini (champion)
2. (United States) Martina Navratilova (final)
3. (Spain) Arantxa Sánchez Vicario (quarterfinals)
4. (United States) Jennifer Capriati (second round)
5. (Czechoslovakia) Helena Suková (quarterfinals)
6. (United States) Lori McNeil (second round)
7. (Commonwealth of Independent States) Natasha Zvereva (first round)
8. (Peru) Laura Gildmeiester (quarterfinals)

== Draw ==
=== Key ===
- Q = Qualifier
- WC = Wild card
- LL = Lucky loser
- Alt = Alternate
- SE = Special exempt
- PR = Protected ranking
- ITF = ITF entry
- JE = Junior exempt
- w/o = Walkover
- r = Retired
- d = Defaulted
- SR = Special ranking

=== Finals ===
Semifinals
1	(Argentina) Gabriela Sabatini	6	6
(Japan) Kimiko Date	3	0
(Bulgaria) Magdalena Maleeva	2	2
2	(United States) Martina Navratilova	6	6

Final
1	(Argentina) Gabriela Sabatini	6	4	6
2	(United States) Martina Navratilova	2	6	2

=== Top half ===
First round
(United Kingdom) J Durie	4	1
WC/Q	(Japan) M Endo	6	6
(United States) C Cunningham	3	2
(United States) P Shriver	6	6
(Czechoslovakia) K Habšudová	5	3
6	(United States) L McNeil	7	6
Q	(Japan) K Okamoto	6^{4}	4
(Australia) R McQuillan	7^{7}	6
(United States) P Fendick	3	1
(Japan) K Date	6	6
Q	(Australia) R Stubbs	6	7^{7}
7	(Commonwealth of Independent States) N Zvereva	4	6^{5}

Second round
1	(Argentina) G Sabatini	6	7
WC/Q	(Japan) M Endo	2	5
(United States) P Shriver	6	6
6	(United States) L McNeil	4	1
3	(Spain) A Sánchez Vicario	3	6	6
(Australia) R McQuillan	6	3	2
(Japan) K Date	7	6
Q	(Australia) R Stubbs	5	1

Quarterfinals
1	(Argentina) G Sabatini	6	6^{4}	6
(United States) P Shriver	2	7^{7}	4
3	(Spain) A Sánchez Vicario	3	4
(Japan) K Date	6	6

Semifinals
1	(Argentina) G Sabatini	6	6
(Japan) K Date	3	0

=== Bottom half ===
First round
5	(Czechoslovakia) H Suková	6	6
(Czechoslovakia) E Švíglerová	0	3
(Australia) A Minter	2	5
(Chinese Taipei) S-t Wang	6	7
(Bulgaria) M Maleeva	7^{7}	6
(Netherlands) B Schultz	6^{4}	4
8	(Peru) L Gildemeister	6	7
(United States) P Louie Harper	1	5
WC	(Japan) A Kijimuta	0	6	6
LL	(Japan) R Hiraki	6	0	3
Q	(Japan) M Yokobori	6	0	3
(Indonesia) Y Basuki	0	6	6

Second round
5	(Czechoslovakia) H Suková	7	6
(Chinese Taipei) S-t Wang	5	4
(Bulgaria) M Maleeva	6	6
4	(United States) J Capriati	1	2
8	(Peru) L Gildemeister	6	6
WC	(Japan) A Kijimuta	1	4
(Indonesia) Y Basuki	0	5
2	(United States) M Navratilova	6	7

Quarterfinals
5	(Czechoslovakia) H Suková	2	4
(Bulgaria) M Maleeva	6	6
8	(Peru) L Gildemeister	4	3
2	(United States) M Navratilova	6	6

Semifinals
(Bulgaria) M Maleeva	2	2
2	(United States) M Navratilova	6	6
