= 1993 ATP Championship Series, Single Week =

Men's professional tennis tour

Details
- Duration: March 1 – November 7
- Edition: 4th
- Tournaments: 9

Achievements (singles)
- Most titles: (United States) Jim Courier (Germany) Michael Stich (2)
- Most finals: (Croatia) Goran Ivanišević (3)

The 1993 ATP Championship Series, Single Week was a series of tennis tournament that was part of the 1993 ATP Tour, the elite tour for professional men's tennis organised by the Association of Tennis Professionals. It formed the tier below the Grand Slam tournaments.

== Results ==
* First-time champion

Masters	Singles champions	Runners-up	Score	Doubles champions	Runners-up	Score
Indian Wells Singles – Doubles	(United States) Jim Courier	(South Africa) Wayne Ferreira	6–3, 6–3, 6–1	(France) Guy Forget	(United States) Luke Jensen (United States) Scott Melville	4–6, 6–2, 7–6
Indian Wells Singles – Doubles	(United States) Jim Courier	(South Africa) Wayne Ferreira	6–3, 6–3, 6–1	(France) Henri Leconte*	(United States) Luke Jensen (United States) Scott Melville	4–6, 6–2, 7–6
Miami Singles – Doubles	(United States) Pete Sampras	(United States) MaliVai Washington	6–3, 6–2	(Netherlands) Richard Krajicek* (Netherlands) Jan Siemerink*	(United States) Patrick McEnroe (United States) Jonathan Stark	6–7, 6–4, 7–6
Monte Carlo Singles – Doubles	(Spain) Sergi Bruguera	(France) Cédric Pioline	7–6^{(7–2)}, 6–0	(Sweden) Stefan Edberg*	(Netherlands) Paul Haarhuis (Netherlands) Mark Koevermans	6–2, 2–6, 7–5
Monte Carlo Singles – Doubles	(Spain) Sergi Bruguera	(France) Cédric Pioline	7–6^{(7–2)}, 6–0	(Czech Republic) Petr Korda	(Netherlands) Paul Haarhuis (Netherlands) Mark Koevermans	6–2, 2–6, 7–5
Hamburg Singles – Doubles	(Germany) Michael Stich*	(Russia) Andrei Chesnokov	6–3, 6–7^{(1–7)}, 7–6^{(9–7)}, 6–4	(Netherlands) Paul Haarhuis* (Netherlands) Mark Koevermans*	(Canada) Grant Connell (United States) Patrick Galbraith	7–6, 6–4
Rome Singles – Doubles	(United States) Jim Courier	(Croatia) Goran Ivanišević	6–1, 6–2, 6–2	(Netherlands) Jacco Eltingh*	(South Africa) Wayne Ferreira (Australia) Mark Kratzmann	6–4, 7–6
Rome Singles – Doubles	(United States) Jim Courier	(Croatia) Goran Ivanišević	6–1, 6–2, 6–2	(Netherlands) Paul Haarhuis	(South Africa) Wayne Ferreira (Australia) Mark Kratzmann	6–4, 7–6
Montreal Singles – Doubles	(Sweden) Mikael Pernfors*	(United States) Todd Martin	2–6, 6–2, 7–5	(United States) Jim Courier	(Canada) Glenn Michibata (United States) David Pate	6–1 1–6 7–6
Montreal Singles – Doubles	(Sweden) Mikael Pernfors*	(United States) Todd Martin	2–6, 6–2, 7–5	(The Bahamas) Mark Knowles*	(Canada) Glenn Michibata (United States) David Pate	6–1 1–6 7–6
Cincinnati Singles – Doubles	(United States) Michael Chang	(Sweden) Stefan Edberg	7–5, 0–6, 6–4	(United States) Andre Agassi*	(Sweden) Stefan Edberg (Sweden) Henrik Holm	6–4, 7–6
Cincinnati Singles – Doubles	(United States) Michael Chang	(Sweden) Stefan Edberg	7–5, 0–6, 6–4	(Czech Republic) Petr Korda	(Sweden) Stefan Edberg (Sweden) Henrik Holm	6–4, 7–6
Stockholm Singles – Doubles	(Germany) Michael Stich	(Croatia) Goran Ivanišević	4–6, 7–6^{(8–6)}, 7–6^{(7–3)}, 6–2	(Australia) Mark Woodforde (Australia) Todd Woodbridge	(South Africa) Gary Muller (South Africa) Danie Visser	7–6, 5–7, 7–6
Paris Singles – Doubles	(Croatia) Goran Ivanišević	(Ukraine) Andriy Medvedev	6–4, 6–2, 7–6^{(7–2)}	(Zimbabwe) Byron Black* (United States) Jonathan Stark*	(Netherlands) Tom Nijssen (Czech Republic) Cyril Suk	7–6, 6–4

== Tournament details ==
Key

- Q = Qualifier
- WC = Wild card
- LL = Lucky loser
- Alt = Alternate
- ITF = ITF entry
- PR = Protected ranking
- SR = Special ranking
- SE = Special exempt
- JE = Junior exempt
- JR = Junior Accelerator Programme entrant
- CO = College Accelerator Programme entrant
- NG = Next Gen Accelerator Program entrant
- w/o = Walkover
- r = Retired
- d = Defaulted

=== Indian Wells ===
Tournament name	Newsweek Champions Cup
Dates	March 1 – 7
Surface	Hard (outdoors)
Location	Indian Wells, California, United States

==== Singles ====
Quarter-finals
1	(United States) Jim Courier	6	6^{3}	6
(Switzerland) Marc Rosset	3	7^{7}	3
4	(United States) Michael Chang	6	6
5	(Czech Republic) Petr Korda	1	3
(Argentina) Alberto Mancini	4	6^{2}
14	(South Africa) Wayne Ferreira	6	7^{7}
(France) Fabrice Santoro	4	1
15	(Russia) Alexander Volkov	6	6

Semi-finals
1	(United States) Jim Courier	6	6
4	(United States) Michael Chang	4	4
14	(South Africa) Wayne Ferreira	7^{7}	6
15	(Russia) Alexander Volkov	6^{3}	3

Final
1	(United States) Jim Courier	6	6	6
14	(South Africa) Wayne Ferreira	3	3	1

==== Doubles ====
Semifinals
(United States) Mark Keil (South Africa) Stefan Kruger	6	6^{6}	3
(United States) Luke Jensen (United States) Scott Melville	4	7^{8}	6
WC	(France) Guy Forget (France) Henri Leconte	6	6
2	(Australia) Mark Kratzmann (Australia) Wally Masur	4	4

Final
(United States) Luke Jensen (United States) Scott Melville	4	5
WC	(France) Guy Forget (France) Henri Leconte	6	7

=== Key Biscayne ===
Tournament name	Lipton Championships
Dates	March 12 – 21
Surface	Hard (outdoors)
Location	Key Biscayne, Florida, United States

==== Singles ====
Quarterfinals
18	(Australia) Mark Woodforde	4	2
(South Africa) Marcos Ondruska	6	6
14	(United States) MaliVai Washington	6	7^{8}
(United States) Patrick McEnroe	1	6^{6}
5	(Czech Republic) Petr Korda	7^{7}	7^{7}
3	(Sweden) Stefan Edberg	6^{3}	6^{5}
10	(Netherlands) Richard Krajicek	3	6^{7}
2	(United States) Pete Sampras	6	7^{9}

Semifinals
(South Africa) Marcos Ondruska	6	4	6^{5}
14	(United States) MaliVai Washington	2	6	7^{7}
5	(Czech Republic) Petr Korda	3	6	2
2	(United States) Pete Sampras	6	2	6

Final
14	(United States) MaliVai Washington	3	2
2	(United States) Pete Sampras	6	6

==== Doubles ====
Semifinals
(Zimbabwe) Byron Black (United States) Mike Briggs	6	4	4
3	(United States) Patrick McEnroe (United States) Jonathan Stark	3	6	6
WC	(Netherlands) Richard Krajicek (Netherlands) Jan Siemerink	w/o
WC	(United States) Paul Annacone (United States) David Wheaton

Final
3	(United States) Patrick McEnroe (United States) Jonathan Stark	7^{7}	4	6^{4}
WC	(Netherlands) Richard Krajicek (Netherlands) Jan Siemerink	6^{4}	6	7^{7}

=== Monte Carlo ===
Tournament name	Monte Carlo Open
Dates	April 19 – 25
Surface	Clay (outdoors)
Location	Roquebrune-Cap-Martin, France

==== Singles ====
Quarter-finals
1	(Sweden) Stefan Edberg	6	6
7	(Ukraine) Andriy Medvedev	4	3
(France) Cédric Pioline	6	6
WC	(Sweden) Jonas Svensson	3	4
11	(Spain) Sergi Bruguera	7^{7}	6
14	(Spain) Carlos Costa	6^{3}	2
8	(Austria) Thomas Muster	6	6
Q	(Spain) Àlex Corretja	2	2

Semi-finals
1	(Sweden) Stefan Edberg	4	4
(France) Cédric Pioline	6	6
11	(Spain) Sergi Bruguera	6	1	7^{9}
8	(Austria) Thomas Muster	4	6	6^{7}

Final
(France) Cédric Pioline	6^{2}	0
11	(Spain) Sergi Bruguera	7^{7}	6

==== Doubles ====
Semifinals
8	(Netherlands) Paul Haarhuis (Netherlands) Mark Koevermans	6	6
3	(South Africa) David Adams (Russia) Andrei Olhovskiy	4	2
6	(Spain) Sergio Casal (Spain) Emilio Sánchez	3	4
WC	(Sweden) Stefan Edberg (Czech Republic) Petr Korda	6	6

Final
8	(Netherlands) Paul Haarhuis (Netherlands) Mark Koevermans	3	6	7^{7}
WC	(Sweden) Stefan Edberg (Czech Republic) Petr Korda	6	2	6^{4}

=== Hamburg ===
Tournament name	ATP German Open
Dates	May 3 – 9
Surface	Clay (outdoors)
Location	Hamburg, Germany

==== Singles ====
Quarter-finals
16	(Spain) Emilio Sánchez	6^{4}	6	6
7	(Netherlands) Richard Krajicek	7^{7}	3	3
WC/3	(United States) Ivan Lendl	3	2
6	(Germany) Michael Stich	6	6
(Russia) Andrei Chesnokov	6	6
Q	(Argentina) Horacio de la Peña	2	0
(Sweden) Magnus Gustafsson	7	5	4
(Germany) Bernd Karbacher	5	7	6

Semi-finals
16	(Spain) Emilio Sánchez	7	6^{3}	6^{2}
6	(Germany) Michael Stich	5	7^{7}	7^{7}
(Russia) Andrei Chesnokov	6	6
(Germany) Bernd Karbacher	2	4

Final
6	(Germany) Michael Stich	6	6^{1}	7^{9}	6
(Russia) Andrei Chesnokov	3	7^{7}	6^{7}	4

==== Doubles ====
Semifinals
7	(Netherlands) Paul Haarhuis (Netherlands) Mark Koevermans	6	7
6/WC	(Spain) Sergio Casal (Spain) Emilio Sánchez	3	5
5	(Canada) Grant Connell (United States) Patrick Galbraith	2	6	6
(Netherlands) Richard Krajicek (Netherlands) Menno Oosting	6	3	4

Final
7	(Netherlands) Paul Haarhuis (Netherlands) Mark Koevermans	6	6	7
5	(Canada) Grant Connell (United States) Patrick Galbraith	4	7	6

=== Rome ===
Tournament name	Italian Open
Dates	May 10 – 17
Surface	Clay (outdoors)
Location	Rome, Italy

==== Singles ====
Quarter-finals
1	(United States) Pete Sampras	6	6
(Argentina) G Pérez Roldán	0	2
4	(Croatia) Goran Ivanišević	7^{7}	6
(Uruguay) Marcelo Filippini	6^{5}	4
6	(United States) Michael Chang	6	5	7
(Russia) Andrei Chesnokov	3	7	5
7	(Spain) Sergi Bruguera	3	4
2	(United States) Jim Courier	6	6

Semi-finals
1	(United States) Pete Sampras	6^{4}	2
4	(Croatia) Goran Ivanišević	7^{7}	6
6	(United States) Michael Chang	2	7^{7}	0
2	(United States) Jim Courier	6	6^{2}	6

Final
4	(Croatia) Goran Ivanišević	1	2	2
2	(United States) Jim Courier	6	6	6

==== Doubles ====
Semifinals
(United States) Luke Jensen (United States) Murphy Jensen	2	1
(South Africa) Wayne Ferreira (Australia) Mark Kratzmann	6	6
6	(Netherlands) Jacco Eltingh (Netherlands) Paul Haarhuis	6	6
(Germany) Patrik Kühnen (Czech Republic) Cyril Suk	4	2

Final
(South Africa) Wayne Ferreira (Australia) Mark Kratzmann	4	6
6	(Netherlands) Jacco Eltingh (Netherlands) Paul Haarhuis	6	7

=== Montreal ===
Tournament name	Canadian Open
Dates	July 26 – August 1
Surface	Hard (outdoors)
Location	Montreal, Quebec, Canada

==== Singles ====
Quarter-finals
(New Zealand) Brett Steven	6	3	2
(United States) Richey Reneberg	3	6	6
13	(United States) Todd Martin	7	6
11	(United States) Andre Agassi	5	3
6	(Czech Republic) Petr Korda	7^{7}	6
4	(United States) Ivan Lendl	6^{4}	1
8	(Russia) Alexander Volkov	2	1
(Sweden) Mikael Pernfors	6	6

Semi-finals
(United States) Richey Reneberg	3	4
13	(United States) Todd Martin	6	6
6	(Czech Republic) Petr Korda	6^{4}	5
(Sweden) Mikael Pernfors	7^{7}	7

Final
13	(United States) Todd Martin	6	2	5
(Sweden) Mikael Pernfors	2	6	7

==== Doubles ====
Semifinals
1	(United States) Patrick McEnroe (United States) Richey Reneberg	3	2
6	(Canada) Glenn Michibata (United States) David Pate	6	6
(United States) Jim Courier (The Bahamas) Mark Knowles	4	7	7
2	(Canada) Grant Connell (United States) Patrick Galbraith	6	6	6

Final
6	(Canada) Glenn Michibata (United States) David Pate	4	6
(United States) Jim Courier (The Bahamas) Mark Knowles	6	7

=== Cincinnati ===
Tournament name	Thriftway ATP Championships
Dates	August 9 – 15
Surface	Hard (outdoors)
Location	Mason, Ohio, United States

==== Singles ====
Quarter-finals
1	(United States) Pete Sampras	6	6
Q	(United States) Steve Bryan	4	0
3	(Sweden) Stefan Edberg	6	6
(United States) Brad Gilbert	4	2
(United States) Andre Agassi	6	6
4	(Germany) Michael Stich	3	2
7	(United States) Michael Chang	7^{7}	5	6
(Australia) Jason Stoltenberg	6^{3}	7	3

Semi-finals
1	(United States) Pete Sampras	7^{7}	5	6^{5}
3	(Sweden) Stefan Edberg	6^{3}	7	7^{7}
(United States) Andre Agassi	5	6	5
7	(United States) Michael Chang	7	1	7

Final
3	(Sweden) Stefan Edberg	5	6	4
7	(United States) Michael Chang	7	0	6

==== Doubles ====
Semifinals
1	(United States) Patrick McEnroe (United States) Richey Reneberg	4	6	4
WC	(United States) Andre Agassi (Czech Republic) Petr Korda	6	2	6
3	(Canada) Grant Connell (United States) Patrick Galbraith	4	4
(Sweden) Stefan Edberg (Sweden) Henrik Holm	6	6

Final
WC	(United States) Andre Agassi (Czech Republic) Petr Korda	7^{7}	6
(Sweden) Stefan Edberg (Sweden) Henrik Holm	6^{4}	4

=== Stockholm ===
Tournament name	Stockholm Open
Dates	October 25 – 31
Surface	Carpet (indoors)
Location	Stockholm, Sweden

==== Singles ====
Quarter-finals
16	(France) Arnaud Boetsch	3	1
8	(Croatia) Goran Ivanišević	6	6
(United States) MaliVai Washington	4	6	6
(Sweden) Jonas Svensson	6	3	4
6	(Sweden) Stefan Edberg	6	2	4
4	(Germany) Michael Stich	1	6	6
9	(Czech Republic) Petr Korda	4	6^{5}
15	(Switzerland) Marc Rosset	6	7^{7}

Semi-finals
8	(Croatia) Goran Ivanišević	6	6
(United States) MaliVai Washington	2	1
4	(Germany) Michael Stich	6	7^{7}
15	(Switzerland) Marc Rosset	4	6^{1}

Final
8	(Croatia) Goran Ivanišević	6	6^{6}	6^{3}	2
4	(Germany) Michael Stich	4	7^{8}	7^{7}	6

==== Doubles ====
Semifinals
1	(Canada) Grant Connell (United States) Patrick Galbraith	4	4
(South Africa) Gary Muller (South Africa) Danie Visser	6	6
(United States) Scott Davis (United States) Richey Reneberg	3	6	1
2	(Australia) Todd Woodbridge (Australia) Mark Woodforde	6	4	6

Final
(South Africa) Gary Muller (South Africa) Danie Visser	1	6	2
2	(Australia) Todd Woodbridge (Australia) Mark Woodforde	6	3	6

=== Paris ===
Tournament name	Paris Open
Dates	November 1 – 7
Surface	Carpet (indoors)
Location	Paris, France

==== Singles ====
Quarter-finals
1	(United States) Pete Sampras	6^{3}	5
8	(Croatia) Goran Ivanišević	7^{7}	7
4	(Germany) Michael Stich	2	7	2
6	(Sweden) Stefan Edberg	6	5	6
(France) Arnaud Boetsch	3	6	7^{7}
3	(Germany) Boris Becker	6	3	6^{4}
8	(Ukraine) Andriy Medvedev	4	7	6
(Australia) Mark Woodforde	6	5	4

Semi-finals
9	(Croatia) Goran Ivanišević	4	7^{7}	7^{7}
6	(Sweden) Stefan Edberg	6	6^{4}	6^{3}
(France) Arnaud Boetsch	6	6^{3}	5
8	(Ukraine) Andriy Medvedev	2	7^{7}	7

Final
9	(Croatia) Goran Ivanišević	6	6	7^{7}
8	(Ukraine) Andriy Medvedev	4	2	6^{2}

==== Doubles ====
Semifinals
(Netherlands) Tom Nijssen (Czech Republic) Cyril Suk	7	6
5	(Netherlands) Jacco Eltingh (Netherlands) Paul Haarhuis	5	3
(Zimbabwe) Byron Black (United States) Jonathan Stark	6	6
(Sweden) Henrik Holm (Australia) Laurie Warder	4	4

Final
(Netherlands) Tom Nijssen (Czech Republic) Cyril Suk	6	5	2
(Zimbabwe) Byron Black (United States) Jonathan Stark	4	7	6

== Titles won by player ==
=== Singles ===
#	Player	IN	MI	MO	HA	RO	CA	CI	ST	PA	#	Winning span
1	(United States) Jim Courier	2	1	-	-	2	-	-	-	-	5	1991–1993 (3)
2	(United States) Michael Chang	1	1	-	-	-	1	1	-	-	4	1990–1993 (4)
=	(Sweden) Stefan Edberg	1	-	-	1	-	-	1	-	1	4	1990–1992 (3)
4	(Germany) Boris Becker	-	-	-	-	-	-	-	2	1	3	1990–1992 (3)
5	(United States) Andre Agassi	-	1	-	-	-	1	-	-	-	2	1990–1992 (3)
=	(Spain) Sergi Bruguera	-	-	2	-	-	-	-	-	-	2	1991–1993 (3)
=	(Russia) Andrei Chesnokov	-	-	1	-	-	1	-	-	-	2	1990–1991 (2)
=	(France) Guy Forget	-	-	-	-	-	-	1	-	1	2	1991
=	(Croatia) Goran Ivanišević	-	-	-	-	-	-	-	1	1	2	1992–1993 (2)
=	(Austria) Thomas Muster	-	-	1	-	1	-	-	-	-	2	1990–1992 (3)
=	(United States) Pete Sampras	-	1	-	-	-	-	1	-	-	2	1992–1993 (2)
=	(Germany) Michael Stich	-	-	-	1	-	-	-	1	-	2	1993
13	(Spain) Juan Aguilera	-	-	-	1	-	-	-	-	-	1	1990
=	(Czech Republic) Karel Nováček	-	-	-	1	-	-	-	-	-	1	1991
=	(Spain) Emilio Sánchez	-	-	-	-	1	-	-	-	-	1	1991
=	(Sweden) Mikael Pernfors	-	-	-	-	-	1	-	-	-	1	1993

== See also ==
- ATP Tour Masters 1000
- 1993 ATP Tour
- 1993 WTA Tier I Series
- 1993 WTA Tour
