= 1992 Toray Pan Pacific Open – Doubles =

Doubles
- 1992 Toray Pan Pacific Open

Final
- Champions: (Spain) Arantxa Sánchez Vicario (Czechoslovakia) Helena Suková
- Runners-up: (United States) Martina Navratilova (United States) Pam Shriver
- Score: 7–5, 6–1

Details
- Draw: 16 (1Q/1LL)
- Seeds: 4

Events
Singles	Doubles
← 1991 ·	Pan Pacific Open	· 1993 →

Kathy Jordan and Elizabeth Smylie were the defending champions, but none competed this year.

Arantxa Sánchez Vicario and Helena Suková won the title by defeating Martina Navratilova and Pam Shriver 7–5, 6–1 in the final.

== Seeds ==
1. (United States) Martina Navratilova / (United States) Pam Shriver (final)
2. (Spain) Arantxa Sánchez Vicario / (Czechoslovakia) Helena Suková (champions)
3. (United States) ~~Patty Fendick~~ / (United States) ~~Lori McNeil~~ (withdrew)
4. (United States) Sandy Collins / (Australia) Rachel McQuillan (semifinals)

== Draw ==
=== Key ===
- Q = Qualifier
- WC = Wild card
- LL = Lucky loser
- Alt = Alternate
- SE = Special exempt
- PR = Protected ranking
- ITF = ITF entry
- JE = Junior exempt
- w/o = Walkover
- r = Retired
- d = Defaulted
- SR = Special ranking

=== Draw ===
First round
1	(United States) M Navratilova (United States) P Shriver	6	6
(Australia) KA Guse (Japan) Masako Nishina	0	1
(Japan) Y Kamio (Japan) A Kijimuta	0	5
(Japan) K Date (Bulgaria) M Maleeva	6	7
LL	(Japan) K Nagatsuka (Japan) M Yokobori	1	1
(United States) A Henricksson (United States) H Ludloff	6	6
(Indonesia) Y Basuki (United Kingdom) J Durie	7	2	4
(United States) P Louie Harper (United States) Ca MacGregor	5	6	6
Q	(Japan) K Okamoto (Japan) E Okagawa	1	1
(United States) S Rehe (Netherlands) B Schultz	6	6
(Czechoslovakia) K Habšudová (Japan) R Hiraki	3	4
4	(United States) S Collins (Australia) R McQuillan	6	6
(United States) S Stafford (Australia) R Stubbs	5	6	6
(Japan) E Iida (Japan) M Miyauchi	7	4	0
(United States) C Cunningham (Peru) L Gildemeister	0	1
2	(Spain) A Sánchez Vicario (Czechoslovakia) H Suková	6	6

Quarterfinals
1	(United States) M Navratilova (United States) P Shriver	6	3	6
(Japan) K Date (Bulgaria) M Maleeva	3	6	0
(United States) A Henricksson (United States) H Ludloff	3	5
(United States) P Louie Harper (United States) Ca MacGregor	6	7
(United States) S Rehe (Netherlands) B Schultz	3	4
4	(United States) S Collins (Australia) R McQuillan	6	6
(United States) S Stafford (Australia) R Stubbs	4	3
2	(Spain) A Sánchez Vicario (Czechoslovakia) H Suková	6	6

Semifinals
1	(United States) M Navratilova (United States) P Shriver	6	6
(United States) P Louie Harper (United States) Ca MacGregor	2	3
4	(United States) S Collins (Australia) R McQuillan	1	4
2	(Spain) A Sánchez Vicario (Czechoslovakia) H Suková	6	6

Final
1	(United States) M Navratilova (United States) P Shriver	5	1
2	(Spain) A Sánchez Vicario (Czechoslovakia) H Suková	7	6
