= 1994 Toray Pan Pacific Open – Doubles =

Doubles
- 1994 Toray Pan Pacific Open
- 1993 Champions: (United States) Martina Navratilova (Czech Republic) Helena Suková

Final
- Champions: (United States) Pam Shriver (Australia) Elizabeth Smylie
- Runners-up: (Netherlands) Manon Bollegraf (United States) Martina Navratilova
- Score: 6–3, 3–6, 7–6

Details
- Draw: 16
- Seeds: 4

Events
Singles	Doubles
← 1993 ·	Toray Pan Pacific Open	· 1995 →

Martina Navratilova and Helena Suková were the defending champions but they competed with different partners that year, Navratilova with Manon Bollegraf and Suková with Larisa Neiland.

Neiland and Suková lost in the first round to Kimiko Date and Nana Miyagi.

Bollegraf and Navratilova lost in the final 6–3, 3–6, 7–6 against Pam Shriver and Elizabeth Smylie.

== Seeds ==
Champion seeds are indicated in bold text while text in italics indicates the round in which those seeds were eliminated.

1. (Latvia) Larisa Neiland / (Czech Republic) Helena Suková (first round)
2. (United States) Lori McNeil / (Australia) Rennae Stubbs (semifinals)
3. (United States) **Pam Shriver** / (Australia) **Elizabeth Smylie (champions)**
4. (Netherlands) Manon Bollegraf / (United States) Martina Navratilova (final)

== Draw ==
=== Key ===
- Q = Qualifier
- WC = Wild card
- LL = Lucky loser
- Alt = Alternate
- SE = Special exempt
- PR = Protected ranking
- ITF = ITF entry
- JE = Junior exempt
- w/o = Walkover
- r = Retired
- d = Defaulted
- SR = Special ranking

First round
1	(Latvia) L Neiland (Czech Republic) H Suková	0	3
(Japan) **K Date** (Japan) **N Miyagi**	**6**	**6**
(China) F Li (Belgium) D Monami	0	1
(Netherlands) **K Boogert** (Netherlands) **N Muns-Jagerman**	**6**	**6**
3	(United States) **P Shriver** (Australia) **E Smylie**	**6**	**7**
LL	(Japan) A Hirose (Australia) D Jones	3	5
(Australia) **K-A Guse** (Switzerland) **M Maleeva-Fragniere**	**7**	3	**6**
(United Kingdom) V Lake (United Kingdom) C Wood	5	**6**	3
(Australia) N Provis (France) N Tauziat	4	4
(United States) **K Adams** (United States) **K Rinaldi-Stunkel**	**6**	**6**
Q	(Japan) M Endo (Japan) A Sugiyama	3	0
4	(Netherlands) **M Bollegraf** (United States) **M Navratilova**	**6**	**6**
(Japan) E Iida (Japan) M Kidowaki	**6**	4	3
(United States) **S Collins** (South Africa) **M de Swardt**	1	**6**	**6**
WC	(Germany) S Graf (Germany) M Kochta	3	4
2	(United States) **L McNeil** (Australia) **R Stubbs**	**6**	**6**

Quarterfinals
(Japan) **K Date** (Japan) **N Miyagi**	**6**	**6**
(Netherlands) K Boogert (Netherlands) N Muns-Jagerman	4	3
3	(United States) **P Shriver** (Australia) **E Smylie**	4	**6**	**6**
(Australia) K-A Guse (Switzerland) M Maleeva-Fragniere	**6**	0	4
(United States) K Adams (United States) K Rinaldi-Stunkel	2	4
4	(Netherlands) **M Bollegraf** (Spain) **M Navratilova**	**6**	**6**
(United States) S Collins (South Africa) M de Swardt	2	2
2	(United States) **L McNeil** (Australia) **R Stubbs**	**6**	**6**

Semifinals
(Japan) K Date (Japan) N Miyagi	2	**7**	0
3	(United States) **P Shriver** (Australia) **E Smylie**	**6**	5	**6**
4	(Netherlands) **M Bollegraf** (United States) **M Navratilova**	**6**	5	**6**
2	(United States) L McNeil (Australia) **R Stubbs**	3	**7**	3

Final
3	(United States) **Pam Shriver** (Australia) **Elizabeth Smylie**	**6**	3	**7**
4	(Netherlands) Manon Bollegraf (United States) Martina Navratilova	3	**6**	6
