= 2007 Rogers Cup – Doubles =

Doubles
- 2007 Rogers Cup

Final
- Champions: (Slovenia) Katarina Srebotnik (Japan) Ai Sugiyama
- Runners-up: (Zimbabwe) Cara Black (United States) Liezel Huber
- Score: 6–4, 2–6, [10–5]

Details
- Draw: 28
- Seeds: 8

Events
Singles	Doubles
← 2006 ·	Rogers Cup	· 2008 →

Nadia Petrova and Martina Navratilova were the defending champions, but Navratilova retired from the sport on September 10, 2006, and only Petrova competed that year.
Petrova partnered with Svetlana Kuznetsova, but lost in the quarterfinals to Nathalie Dechy and Sun Tiantian.

Katarina Srebotnik and Ai Sugiyama won in the final 6–4, 2–6, 10–5, against Cara Black and Liezel Huber.

== Seeds ==
The top four seeds receive a bye into the second round.

1. (Zimbabwe) Cara Black / (United States) Liezel Huber (final)
2. (Slovenia) Katarina Srebotnik / (Japan) Ai Sugiyama (champions)
3. (Australia) Alicia Molik / (Italy) Mara Santangelo (semifinals)
4. (France) Nathalie Dechy / (China) Sun Tiantian (semifinals)
5. (Spain) Anabel Medina Garrigues / (Spain) Virginia Ruano Pascual (first round)
6. (China) Peng Shuai / (China) Yan Zi (quarterfinals)
7. (Italy) Francesca Schiavone / (Italy) Roberta Vinci (second round)
8. (Russia) Svetlana Kuznetsova / (Russia) Nadia Petrova (quarterfinals, withdrew due to an abdominal strain for Kuznetsova)

== Draw ==
=== Key ===
- Q = Qualifier
- WC = Wild card
- LL = Lucky loser
- Alt = Alternate
- ITF = ITF entry
- PR = Protected ranking
- SR = Special ranking
- SE = Special exempt
- JE = Junior exempt
- JR = Junior Accelerator Programme entrant
- CO = College Accelerator Programme entrant
- NG = Next Gen Accelerator Program entrant
- w/o = Walkover
- r = Retired
- d = Defaulted

=== Finals ===
Semifinals
1	(Zimbabwe) Cara Black (United States) Liezel Huber	6	6
4	(France) Nathalie Dechy (China) Sun Tiantian	2	3
3	(Australia) Alicia Molik (Italy) Mara Santangelo	2	3
2	(Slovenia) Katarina Srebotnik (Japan) Ai Sugiyama	6	6

Final
1	(Zimbabwe) Cara Black (United States) Liezel Huber	4	6	[5]
2	(Slovenia) Katarina Srebotnik (Japan) Ai Sugiyama	6	2	[10]

=== Top half ===
First round
(Slovakia) J Gajdošová (Australia) B Stewart	3	5
(Italy) T Garbin (Israel) S Pe'er	6	7
(United States) L Granville (Croatia) J Kostanić Tošić	4	7	[9]
(France) S Foretz (Tunisia) S Sfar	6	6^{5}	[11]
WC	(Canada) V Tétreault (Canada) A Wozniak	4	2
7	(Italy) F Schiavone (Italy) R Vinci	6	6
(Czech Republic) I Benešová (Russia) G Voskoboeva	6	6
(Netherlands) M Krajicek (Germany) M Müller	4	3
(Ukraine) A Bondarenko (Ukraine) K Bondarenko	6	6
(Switzerland) E Gagliardi (Spain) N Llagostera Vives	1	4
(Russia) A Jidkova (Belarus) T Poutchek	7	6^{3}	[8]
8	(Russia) S Kuznetsova (Russia) N Petrova	5	7	[10]

Second round
1	(Zimbabwe) C Black (South Africa) L Huber	6	4	[10]
(Italy) T Garbin (Israel) S Pe'er	3	6	[8]
(France) S Foretz (Tunisia) S Sfar	6	6
7	(Italy) F Schiavone (Italy) R Vinci	2	4
4	(France) N Dechy (China) T Sun	6	6
(Czech Republic) I Benešová (Russia) G Voksoboeva	3	4
(Ukraine) A Bondarenko (Ukraine) K Bondarenko	6	2	[3]
8	(Russia) S Kuznetsova (Russia) N Petrova	2	6	[10]

Quarterfinals
1	(Zimbabwe) C Black (South Africa) L Huber	6	6
(France) S Foretz (Tunisia) S Sfar	1	4
4	(France) N Dechy (China) T Sun	w/o
8	(Russia) S Kuznetsova (Russia) N Petrova

Semifinals
1	(Zimbabwe) C Black (South Africa) L Huber	6	6
4	(France) N Dechy (China) T Sun	2	3

=== Bottom half ===
First round
5	(Spain) A Medina Garrigues (Spain) V Ruano Pascual	5	3
(Italy) ME Camerin (Argentina) G Dulko	7	6
(Romania) A Ehritt-Vanc (Russia) A Rodionova	6	6
WC	(Canada) S Dubois (Canada) M-È Pelletier	4	4
(Russia) E Dementieva (Italy) F Pennetta	6	6
(Greece) E Daniilidou (Germany) J Wöhr	1	1
6	(China) S Peng (China) Z Yan	1	7	[10]
(France) S Brémond (Russia) M Kirilenko	6	5	[6]
(Hungary) Á Szávay (Czech Republic) V Uhlířová	6	2	[10]
(United States) C Morariu (United States) M Shaughnessy	4	6	[7]
(Czech Republic) E Birnerová (Latvia) L Dekmeijere	6^{2}	6^{8}
(France) É Loit (United States) M Tu	7	7

Second round
(Italy) ME Camerin (Argentina) G Dulko	6	6
(Romania) A Ehritt-Vanc (Russia) A Rodionova	2	4
(Russia) E Dementieva (Italy) F Pennetta
3	(Australia) A Molik (Italy) M Santangelo	w/o
6	(China) S Peng (China) Z Yan	7	6
(Hungary) Á Szávay (Czech Republic) V Uhlířová	5	1
(France) É Loit (United States) M Tu	3	6^{4}
2	(Slovenia) K Srebotnik (Japan) A Sugiyama	6	7

Quarterfinals
(Italy) ME Camerin (Argentina) G Dulko	4	3
3	(Australia) A Molik (Italy) M Santangelo	6	6
6	(China) S Peng (China) Z Yan	1	5
2	(Slovenia) K Srebotnik (Japan) A Sugiyama	6	7

Semifinals
3	(Australia) A Molik (Italy) M Santangelo	2	3
2	(Slovenia) K Srebotnik (Japan) A Sugiyama	6	6
