= 1993 Family Circle Cup – Doubles =

Doubles
- 1993 Family Circle Cup

Final
- Champions: (United States) Gigi Fernández; (Belarus) Natasha Zvereva
- Runners-up: (United States) Katrina Adams; (Netherlands) Manon Bollegraf
- Score: 6–3, 6–1

Details
- Draw: 28 (1WC/1Q)
- Seeds: 8

Events
Singles	Doubles
← 1992 ·	Charleston Open	· 1994 →

Arantxa Sánchez Vicario and Natasha Zvereva were the defending champions, but competed this year with different partners.

Sánchez Vicario teamed up with Larisa Neiland and lost in the semifinals to Katrina Adams and Manon Bollegraf.

Zvereva teamed up with Gigi Fernández and successfully defended her title, by defeating Adams and Bollegraf 6–3, 6–1 in the final.

== Seeds ==
The first four seeds received a bye into the second round.

1. (United States) Gigi Fernández / (Belarus) Natasha Zvereva (champions)
2. (Latvia) Larisa Neiland / (Spain) Arantxa Sánchez Vicario (semifinals)
3. (Canada) Jill Hetherington / (United States) Kathy Rinaldi (quarterfinals)
4. (United States) Zina Garrison Jackson / (Australia) Elizabeth Smylie (second round)
5. (United States) Katrina Adams / (Netherlands) Manon Bollegraf (final)
6. (United States) Sandy Collins / (Bulgaria) Katerina Maleeva (quarterfinals)
7. (Italy) Sandra Cecchini / (Argentina) Patricia Tarabini (first round)
8. (South Africa) Amanda Coetzer / (Argentina) Inés Gorrochategui (quarterfinals)

== Draw ==
=== Key ===
- Q = Qualifier
- WC = Wild card
- LL = Lucky loser
- Alt = Alternate
- SE = Special exempt
- PR = Protected ranking
- ITF = ITF entry
- JE = Junior exempt
- w/o = Walkover
- r = Retired
- d = Defaulted
- SR = Special ranking

=== Finals ===
Semifinals

Final

1
(United States) Gigi Fernández
(Belarus) Natasha Zvereva
6
6

WC
- (Croatia) Iva Majoli
- (United States) Betsy Nagelsen
3
2

1
(United States) Gigi Fernández
(Belarus) Natasha Zvereva
6
6

5
- (United States) Katrina Adams
- (Netherlands) Manon Bollegraf
3
1

5
(United States) Katrina Adams
(Netherlands) Manon Bollegraf
1
7
6

2
- (Latvia) Larisa Neiland
- (Spain) Arantxa Sánchez Vicario
6
5
3

=== Top half ===
First round

Second round

Quarterfinals

Semifinals

1
(United States) G Fernández
(Belarus) N Zvereva
6
6

- (United States) J Emmons
- (United States) G Helgeson
6^{3}
2

- (United States) ML Daniels
- (South Africa) R Fairbank-Nideffer
0
0

(United States) ML Daniels
(South Africa) R Fairbank-Nideffer
7^{7}
6

1
(United States) G Fernández
(Belarus) N Zvereva
7^{7}
6

- (United Kingdom) J Durie
- (New Zealand) J Richardson
6
2
2

8
- (South Africa) A Coetzer
- (Argentina) I Gorrochategui
6^{3}
1

(Italy) L Ferrando
(Czech Republic) P Langrová
2
6
6

- (Italy) L Ferrando
- (Czech Republic) P Langrová
6
6^{5}
6^{3}

- (France) J Halard
- (Argentina) M Paz
2
1

8
(South Africa) A Coetzer
(Argentina) I Gorrochategui
4
7^{7}
7^{7}

8
(South Africa) A Coetzer
(Argentina) I Gorrochategui
6
6

1
(United States) G Fernández
(Belarus) N Zvereva
6
6

WC
- (Croatia) I Majoli
- (United States) B Nagelsen
3
2

4
- (United States) Z Garrison Jackson
- (Australia) E Smylie
2
4

- (United States) Ta Whitlinger
- (United States) Te Whitlinger
5
4

WC
(Croatia) I Majoli
(United States) B Nagelsen
6
6

WC
(Croatia) I Majoli
(United States) B Nagelsen
7
6

WC
(Croatia) I Majoli
(United States) B Nagelsen
6
6

- (United States) C Benjamin
- (United States) C Kuhlman
4
4

6
- (United States) S Collins
- (Bulgaria) K Maleeva
4
4

(Germany) K Kschwendt
(Argentina) F Labat
6
6

- (Germany) K Kschwendt
- (Argentina) F Labat
4
6^{4}

- (Greece) C Papadáki
- (United States) C Rubin
2
1

6
(United States) S Collins
(Bulgaria) K Maleeva
6
7^{7}

6
(United States) S Collins
(Bulgaria) K Maleeva
6
6

=== Bottom half ===
First round

Second round

Quarterfinals

Semifinals

5
(United States) K Adams
(Netherlands) M Bollegraf
6
6

- (United States) C MacGregor
- (United States) S Stafford
2
4

5
(United States) K Adams
(Netherlands) M Bollegraf
6
6

(Switzerland) M Maleeva-Fragnière
(Georgia (country)) L Meskhi
6
6^{7}
7

- (Switzerland) M Maleeva-Fragnière
- (Georgia (country)) L Meskhi
3
4

- (United States) D Graham
- (Netherlands) B Schultz
3
7^{9}
5

5
(United States) K Adams
(Netherlands) M Bollegraf
7
6

(United States) L Harvey Wild
(Canada) P Hy
7^{7}
6

3
- (Canada) J Hetherington
- (United States) K Rinaldi
5
4

- (Italy) L Golarsa
- (France) N van Lottum
6^{5}
4

- (United States) L Harvey Wild
- (Canada) P Hy
6
2
1

3
(Canada) J Hetherington
(United States) K Rinaldi
2
6
6

5
(United States) K Adams
(Netherlands) M Bollegraf
1
7
6

7
- (Italy) S Cecchini
- (Argentina) P Tarabini
4
2

2
- (Latvia) L Neiland
- (Spain) A Sánchez Vicario
6
5
3

(Australia) L Pleming
(Hungary) A Temesvári
6
6

- (Australia) L Pleming
- (Hungary) A Temesvári
6^{6}
4

- (Argentina) B Fulco-Villella
- (Spain) V Ruano Pascual
4
6
2

Q
(Czech Republic) R Bobková
(United States) P O'Reilly
7^{8}
6

Q
(Czech Republic) R Bobková
(United States) P O'Reilly
6
4
6

Q
- (Czech Republic) R Bobková
- (United States) P O'Reilly
2
2

- (Austria) P Ritter
- (Netherlands) C Vis
0
3

2
(Latvia) L Neiland
(Spain) A Sánchez Vicario
6
6

(United States) J Capriati
(United States) L Davenport
6
6

- (United States) J Capriati
- (United States) L Davenport
2
2

2
(Latvia) L Neiland
(Spain) A Sánchez Vicario
6
6
