= 1992 Toray Pan Pacific Open =

- Date: 28 January – February 2
- Edition: 9th
- Category: Tier II
- Draw: 28S / 16D
- Prize money: $350,000
- Surface: Carpet / indoor
- Location: Shibuya, Tokyo, Japan
- Venue: Tokyo Metropolitan Gymnasium

Champions

Singles
- (Argentina) Gabriela Sabatini

Doubles
- (Spain) Arantxa Sánchez Vicario (Czechoslovakia) Helena Suková
- Pan Pacific Open

The 1992 Toray Pan Pacific Open was a women's tennis tournament played on indoor carpet courts at the Tokyo Metropolitan Gymnasium in Tokyo, Japan that was part of the Tier II Series of the 1992 WTA Tour. It was the 9th edition of the Pan Pacific Open and took place from 28 January through 2 February 1992. First-seeded Gabriela Sabatini won the singles title and earned $70,000 first-prize money as well as 300 ranking points.

== Finals ==
=== Singles ===
(Argentina) Gabriela Sabatini defeated (United States) Martina Navratilova 6–2, 4–6, 6–2

- It was Sabatini's 2nd singles title of the year and the 22nd of her career.

=== Doubles ===
(Spain) Arantxa Sánchez Vicario / (Czechoslovakia) Helena Suková defeated (United States) Martina Navratilova / (United States) Pam Shriver 7–5, 6–1
