= 1993 Family Circle Cup =

- Date: March 29 – April 4
- Edition: 21st
- Category: Tier I
- Draw: 56S / 28D
- Prize money: $750,000
- Surface: Clay / outdoor
- Location: Hilton Head Island, South Carolina, U.S.
- Venue: Sea Pines Plantation

Champions

Singles
- (Germany) Steffi Graf

Doubles
- (United States) Gigi Fernández; (Belarus) Natasha Zvereva
- Family Circle Cup

The 1993 Family Circle Cup was a women's tennis tournament played on outdoor clay courts at the Sea Pines Plantation on Hilton Head Island, South Carolina in the United States and was part of Tier I of the 1993 WTA Tour. It was the 21st edition of the tournament and ran from March 29 through April 4, 1993. First-seeded Steffi Graf won the singles title, her fourth at the event.

== Finals ==
=== Singles ===
(Germany) Steffi Graf defeated (Spain) Arantxa Sánchez Vicario 7–6^{(10–8)}, 6–1

- It was Graf's 2nd singles title of the year and the 71st of her career.

=== Doubles ===
(United States) Gigi Fernández / (Belarus) Natasha Zvereva defeated (United States) Katrina Adams / (Netherlands) Manon Bollegraf 6–3, 6–1

- It was Fernández' 4th doubles title of the year and the 35th of her career. It was Zvereva's 4th doubles title of the year and the 32nd of her career.
