= Marketa Kochta =

German tennis player

- Country (sports): Germany
- Born: 14 July 1975 (age 49); Prague, Czechoslovakia
- Height: 1.69 m (5 ft 7 in)
- Retired: 2002
- Plays: Right-handed
- Prize money: $375,688

Singles
- Career record: 193–202
- Career titles: 2 ITF
- Highest ranking: No. 45 (18 July 1994)

Grand Slam singles results
- Australian Open: 3R (1992, 1997)
- French Open: 3R (1994)
- Wimbledon: 1R (1993, 1994, 1995)
- US Open: 1R (1994, 1997)

Doubles
- Career record: 49–75
- Career titles: 1 ITF
- Highest ranking: No. 169 (25 September 2000)

Marketa Kochta (born 14 July 1975) is a former professional tennis player from Germany.

== Early life and family ==
Kochta was born in Prague, then part of Czechoslovakia, but later emigrated to Munich, where her father Jiří was a noted ice hockey coach.

As a junior, she was coached by her father and in 1991 was a member of the German team that won the World Youth Cup (now Junior Fed Cup).

Her elder sister Renata also played on the WTA Tour.

Kochta was previously married to Czech former tennis player Jiří Vaněk

== Professional career ==
As a 16-year old, Kochta made the third round of the 1992 Australian Open.

In 1993, she made the semifinals of the Mazda Classic, a WTA Tour tournament in San Diego.

Kochta's 1994 season was the strongest of her career, culminating in a mid-year ranking of 45, which remained her highest. She was nominated for the WTA Most Impressive Newcomer Award. Highlights for the year included beating Tracy Austin and Katerina Maleeva to make the third round of the 1994 French Open as well as upsetting world No. 5, Gabriela Sabatini, at the Pan Pacific Open in Tokyo.

She made the third round of the 1997 Australian Open as a qualifier.

== ITF finals ==
Legend
$25,000 tournaments
$10,000 tournaments

=== Singles (2–4) ===
Result	No.	Date	Tournament	Surface	Opponent	Score
Loss	1.	21 August 1989	Neumünster, West Germany	Clay	(West Germany) Maja Živec-Škulj	6–2, 4–6, 3–6
Loss	2.	16 April 1990	Naples, Italy	Clay	(Italy) Katia Piccolini	2–6, 4–6
Loss	3.	8 October 1990	Salisbury, United States	Hard	(United States) Elly Hakami	6–4, 6–7, 3–6
Win	4.	1 April 1991	Moulins, France	Hard	(France) Catherine Suire	6–3, 6–4
Loss	5.	2 August 1998	Winnipeg, Canada	Hard	(Israel) Hila Rosen	6–1, 4–6, 6–7
Win	6.	5 September 1999	Spoleto, Italy	Clay	(Italy) Gloria Pizzichini	6–2, 7–6

=== Doubles (1–4) ===
Result	No.	Date	Tournament	Surface	Partner	Opponents	Score
Loss	1.	15 June 1998	Sopot, Poland	Clay	(Germany) Syna Schmidle	(Hungary) Rita Kuti-Kis (Hungary) Anna Földényi	1–6, 6–7^{(4–7)}
Loss	2.	14 June 1999	Gorizia, İtaly	Clay	(Argentina) Erica Krauth	(Spain) Gisela Riera (Spain) Mariam Ramon Climent	5–7, 3–6
Win	3.	14 November 1999	Rungsted, Denmark	Carpet (i)	(Germany) Syna Schmidle	(Germany) Mia Buric (Germany) Jasmin Wöhr	6–4, 7–6, 6–2
Loss	4.	25 June 2000	Sopot, Poland	Clay	(Czech Republic) Ludmila Richterová	(Czech Republic) Milena Nekvapilová (Czech Republic) Hana Šromová	3–6, 2–6
Loss	5.	10 September 2000	Bucharest, Romania	Clay	(Serbia and Montenegro) Katarina Mišić	(Bulgaria) Antoaneta Pandjerova (Bulgaria) Desislava Topalova	4–6, 2–6
