= 1993 Toray Pan Pacific Open – Singles =

Singles
- 1993 Toray Pan Pacific Open

Final
- Champion: (United States) Martina Navratilova
- Runner-up: (Latvia) Larisa Neiland
- Score: 6–2, 6–2

Events
Singles	Doubles
← 1992 ·	Pan Pacific Open	· 1994 →

Martina Navratilova defeated Larisa Neiland in the final, 6–2, 6–2 to win the singles tennis title at the 1993 Pan Pacific Open.

Gabriela Sabatini was the reigning champion, but did not compete this year.

== Seeds ==
1. (Germany) Steffi Graf (semifinals)
2. (Argentina) ~~Gabriela Sabatini~~ (withdrew)
3. (United States) Martina Navratilova (Champion)
4. (Czech Republic) Jana Novotná (semifinals)
5. (Switzerland) Manuela Maleeva-Fragnière (second round)
6. (France) Mary Pierce (first round, retired)
7. (Czech Republic) Helena Suková (first round)
8. (United States) Lori McNeil (first round)

== Draw ==
=== Key ===
- Q = Qualifier
- WC = Wild card
- LL = Lucky loser
- Alt = Alternate
- SE = Special exempt
- PR = Protected ranking
- ITF = ITF entry
- JE = Junior exempt
- w/o = Walkover
- r = Retired
- d = Defaulted
- SR = Special ranking

=== Finals ===
Semifinals
1	(Germany) Steffi Graf	6	3	3
3	(United States) Martina Navratilova	4	6	6
4	(Czech Republic) Jana Novotná	5	3
(Latvia) Larisa Neiland	7	6

Final
3	(United States) Martina Navratilova	6	6
(Latvia) Larisa Neiland	2	2

=== Top half ===
First round
1	(Germany) S Graf	6	7
(Japan) K Date	1	5
(United States) S Stafford	6^{5}	5
(Belarus) N Zvereva	7^{7}	7
Q	(Japan) Y Kamio	6^{2}	6	6
(Chinese Taipei) S-t Wang	7^{7}	2	3
(United States) G Fernández	7	7^{7}
7	(Czech Republic) H Suková	5	6^{4}
3	(United States) M Navratilova	6	3	6
Q	(Japan) A Sugiyama	3	6	3
Q	(Japan) A Hirose	4	3
(Indonesia) Y Basuki	6	6
(France) N Tauziat	6	6
(France) P Paradis-Mangon	3	4
(Australia) M Jaggard-Lai	3	3
5	(Switzerland) M Maleeva-Fragnière	6	6

Second round
1	(Germany) S Graf	6	6
(Belarus) N Zvereva	2	0
Q	(Japan) Y Kamio	6	6
(United States) G Fernández	4	3
3	(United States) M Navratilova	6	6
(Indonesia) Y Basuki	2	1
(France) N Tauziat	7^{7}	6
5	(Switzerland) M Maleeva-Fragnière	6^{5}	3

Quarterfinals
1	(Germany) S Graf	6	6
Q	(Japan) Y Kamio	1	2
3	(United States) M Navratilova	6	6
(France) N Tauziat	1	2

Semifinals
1	(Germany) S Graf	6	3	3
3	(United States) M Navratilova	4	6	6

=== Bottom half ===
First round
6	(France) M Pierce	1	2^{r}
(United States) P Shriver	6	4
(Peru) L Gildemeister	4	6	3
(Bulgaria) M Maleeva	6	3	6
(Japan) M Endo	3	6	6
(Australia) N Provis	6	3	4
WC	(Japan) K Nagatsuka	0	1
4	(Czech Republic) J Novotná	6	6
8	(United States) L McNeil	6	3	2
(Latvia) L Neiland	2	6	6
(United States) L Allen	6^{6}	4
(Hungary) A Temesvári-Trunkos	7^{8}	6
Q	(Netherlands) K Boogert	2	6	6
(Australia) R Stubbs	6	3	3
WC	(Japan) R Hiraki	6	4	6
LL	(Japan) T Takagi	3	6	3

Second round
(United States) P Shriver	6	6
(Bulgaria) M Maleeva	4	3
(Japan) M Endo	4	2
4	(Czech Republic) J Novotná	6	6
(Latvia) L Neiland	6	7
(Hungary) A Temesvári-Trunkos	2	5
Q	(Netherlands) K Boogert	6^{4}	6	2
WC	(Japan) R Hiraki	7^{7}	4	6

Quarterfinals
(United States) P Shriver	7^{7}	3	4
4	(Czech Republic) J Novotná	6^{5}	6	6
(Latvia) L Neiland	6	6
WC	(Japan) R Hiraki	2	3

Semifinals
4	(Czech Republic) J Novotná	5	3
(Latvia) L Neiland	7	6
