= 1994 Toray Pan Pacific Open =

- Date: January 31 – February 6
- Edition: 22nd
- Category: Tier I
- Draw: 32S / 16D
- Prize money: $750,000
- Surface: Carpet / indoor
- Location: Tokyo, Japan
- Venue: Tokyo Metropolitan Gymnasium

Champions

Singles
- (Germany) Steffi Graf

Doubles
- (United States) Pam Shriver / (Australia) Elizabeth Smylie
← 1993 ·	Pan Pacific Open	· 1995 →

The 1994 Toray Pan Pacific Open was a tennis tournament played on indoor carpet courts at the Tokyo Metropolitan Gymnasium in Tokyo in Japan that was part of Tier I of the 1994 WTA Tour. It was the 22nd edition of the tournament and was held from January 31 through February 6, 1994. First-seeded Steffi Graf won the singles title.

== Finals ==
=== Singles ===
(Germany) Steffi Graf defeated (United States) Martina Navratilova 6–2, 6–4

- It was Graf's 2nd singles title of the year and the 81st of her career.

=== Doubles ===
(United States) Pam Shriver / (Australia) Elizabeth Smylie defeated (Netherlands) Manon Bollegraf / (United States) Martina Navratilova 6–3, 3–6, 7–6

- It was Shriver's 1st title of the year and the 132nd of her career. It was Smylie's 1st title of the year and the 36th of her career.
