= 2015 Wuhan Open – Doubles =

Doubles
- 2015 Wuhan Open

Final
- Champions: (Switzerland) Martina Hingis (India) Sania Mirza
- Runners-up: (Romania) Irina-Camelia Begu (Romania) Monica Niculescu
- Score: 6–2, 6–3

Details
- Draw: 28
- Seeds: 8

Events
Singles	Doubles
- Wuhan Open

Martina Hingis and Flavia Pennetta were the defending champions, but Pennetta chose not to participate. Hingis played alongside Sania Mirza and successfully defended the title by defeating Irina-Camelia Begu and Monica Niculescu in the final, 6–2, 6–3.

== Seeds ==
The top four seeds received a bye into the second round.

1. (Switzerland) Martina Hingis / (India) Sania Mirza (champions)
2. (Hungary) Tímea Babos / (France) Kristina Mladenovic (second round)
3. (France) Caroline Garcia / (Slovenia) Katarina Srebotnik (second round)
4. (Chinese Taipei) Chan Hao-ching / (Chinese Taipei) Chan Yung-jan (semifinals)
5. (United States) Raquel Kops-Jones / (United States) Abigail Spears (quarterfinals)
6. (Czech Republic) Andrea Hlaváčková / (Czech Republic) Lucie Hradecká (semifinals)
7. (Spain) Garbiñe Muguruza / (Spain) Carla Suárez Navarro (quarterfinals, withdrew)
8. (Chinese Taipei) Chuang Chia-jung / (Chinese Taipei) Hsieh Su-wei (first round)

== Draw ==
Key

- Q = Qualifier
- WC = Wild card
- LL = Lucky loser
- Alt = Alternate
- ITF = ITF entry
- PR = Protected ranking
- SR = Special ranking
- SE = Special exempt
- JE = Junior exempt
- JR = Junior Accelerator Programme entrant
- CO = College Accelerator Programme entrant
- NG = Next Gen Accelerator Program entrant
- w/o = Walkover
- r = Retired
- d = Defaulted

=== Finals ===
Semifinals
1	(Switzerland) Martina Hingis (India) Sania Mirza	6	6
4	(Chinese Taipei) Chan Hao-ching (Chinese Taipei) Chan Yung-jan	2	1
(Romania) Irina-Camelia Begu (Romania) Monica Niculescu	6	1	[10]
6	(Czech Republic) Andrea Hlaváčková (Czech Republic) Lucie Hradecká	4	6	[8]

Final
1	(Switzerland) Martina Hingis (India) Sania Mirza	6	6
(Romania) Irina-Camelia Begu (Romania) Monica Niculescu	2	3

=== Top half ===
First round
(Poland) K Jans-Ignacik (Australia) An Rodionova	6	6
(Chinese Taipei) C-w Chan (Australia) Ar Rodionova	2	2
(China) X Han (United States) N Melichar	5	6	[10]
(Spain) L Arruabarrena (Slovenia) A Klepač	7	3	[4]
(Italy) S Errani (Italy) F Schiavone	5	4
5	(United States) R Kops-Jones (United States) A Spears	7	6
(Ukraine) L Kichenok (Ukraine) N Kichenok	6	4	[10]
Alt	(Germany) M Barthel (Croatia) D Jurak	4	6	[8]
(Slovakia) D Hantuchová (Italy) R Vinci	6^{3}	7	[7]
(Germany) J Görges (Czech Republic) Ka Plíšková	7^{7}	5	[10]
(Spain) A Medina Garrigues (Spain) A Parra Santonja	5	6	[11]
8	(Chinese Taipei) C-j Chuang (Chinese Taipei) S-w Hsieh	7	3	[9]

Second round
1	(Switzerland) M Hingis (India) S Mirza	6	6
(Poland) K Jans-Ignacik (Australia) An Rodionova	3	2
(China) X Han (United States) N Melichar	6	1	[7]
5	(United States) R Kops-Jones (United States) A Spears	4	6	[10]
4	(Chinese Taipei) H-c Chan (Chinese Taipei) Y-j Chan	6	6
(Ukraine) L Kichenok (Ukraine) N Kichenok	4	2
(Germany) J Görges (Czech Republic) Ka Plíšková	6	6
(Spain) A Medina Garrigues (Spain) A Parra Santonja	3	4

Quarterfinals
1	(Switzerland) M Hingis (India) S Mirza	6	6
5	(United States) R Kops-Jones (United States) A Spears	2	2
4	(Chinese Taipei) H-c Chan (Chinese Taipei) Y-j Chan	6	6
(Germany) J Görges (Czech Republic) Ka Plíšková	2	2

Semifinals
1	(Switzerland) M Hingis (India) S Mirza	6	6
4	(Chinese Taipei) H-c Chan (Chinese Taipei) Y-j Chan	2	1

=== Bottom half ===
First round
7	(Spain) G Muguruza (Spain) C Suárez Navarro	3	6	[10]
(Slovakia) J Husárová (Romania) R Olaru	6	4	[6]
WC	(China) C Liu (China) Z Yang	1	4
(Russia) A Kudryavtseva (Ukraine) O Savchuk	6	6
(Romania) I-C Begu (Romania) M Niculescu	5	7^{7}	[10]
(China) Y Xu (China) S Zheng	7	6^{3}	[8]
6	(Czech Republic) A Hlaváčková (Czech Republic) L Hradecká	6	6
(China) C Liang (China) Y Wang	2	4
(Russia) S Kuznetsova (Australia) S Stosur	6^{5}	5
(Australia) C Dellacqua (Croatia) A Tomljanović	7^{7}	7
(Canada) G Dabrowski (Poland) A Rosolska	6	2	[10]
(Germany) A-L Grönefeld (United States) C Vandeweghe	3	6	[8]

Second round
7	(Spain) G Muguruza (Spain) C Suárez Navarro	7^{7}	6
(Russia) A Kudryavtseva (Ukraine) O Savchuk	6^{3}	2
(Romania) I-C Begu (Romania) M Niculescu	6	6
3	(France) C Garcia (Slovenia) K Srebotnik	2	2
6	(Czech Republic) A Hlaváčková (Czech Republic) L Hradecká	w/o
(Australia) C Dellacqua (Croatia) A Tomljanović
(Canada) G Dabrowski (Poland) A Rosolska	7^{7}	4	[10]
2	(Hungary) T Babos (France) K Mladenovic	6^{5}	6	[5]

Quarterfinals
7	(Spain) G Muguruza (Spain) C Suárez Navarro
(Romania) I-C Begu (Romania) M Niculescu	w/o
6	(Czech Republic) A Hlaváčková (Czech Republic) L Hradecká	6	6
(Canada) G Dabrowski (Poland) A Rosolska	4	3

Semifinals
(Romania) I-C Begu (Romania) M Niculescu	6	1	[10]
6	(Czech Republic) A Hlaváčková (Czech Republic) L Hradecká	4	6	[8]
