= 1993 Family Circle Cup – Singles =

Singles
- 1993 Family Circle Cup

Final
- Champion: (Germany) Steffi Graf
- Runner-up: (Spain) Arantxa Sánchez Vicario
- Score: 7–6^{(10–8)}, 6–1

Details
- Draw: 56 (2WC / 8Q / 3LL)
- Seeds: 16

Events
Singles	Doubles
← 1992 ·	Charleston Open	· 1994 →

Steffi Graf defeated Arantxa Sánchez Vicario in the final, 7–6^{(10–8)}, 6–1 to win the singles tennis title at the 1993 Family Circle Cup.

Gabriela Sabatini was the two-time defending champion, but lost in semifinals to Graf.

== Seeds ==
The first eight seeds received a bye into the second round.

1. (Germany) Steffi Graf (champion)
2. (Spain) Arantxa Sánchez Vicario (final)
3. (Argentina) Gabriela Sabatini (semifinals)
4. (United States) Jennifer Capriati (semifinals)
5. (Switzerland) Manuela Maleeva-Fragnière (second round)
6. (Bulgaria) Katerina Maleeva (quarterfinals)
7. (South Africa) Amanda Coetzer (quarterfinals)
8. (United States) Zina Garrison-Jackson (second round)
9. (Belarus) Natasha Zvereva (first round, retired)
10. (France) Julie Halard (second round)
11. (Georgia (country)) Leila Meskhi (third round)
12. (Canada) Patricia Hy (third round)
13. (United States) Gigi Fernández (third round)
14. (Netherlands) Brenda Schultz (first round)
15. (Italy) Sandra Cecchini (third round)
16. (Croatia) Iva Majoli (first round)

== Draw ==
=== Key ===
- Q = Qualifier
- WC = Wild card
- LL = Lucky loser
- Alt = Alternate
- SE = Special exempt
- PR = Protected ranking
- ITF = ITF entry
- JE = Junior exempt
- w/o = Walkover
- r = Retired
- d = Defaulted
- SR = Special ranking

=== Finals ===
Quarterfinals
1	(Germany) Steffi Graf	6	6
(United States) Chanda Rubin	1	2
3	(Argentina) Gabriela Sabatini	6	6
6	(Bulgaria) Katerina Maleeva	4	2
7	(South Africa) Amanda Coetzer	4	0
4	(United States) Jennifer Capriati	6	6
(Germany) Sabine Hack	2	2
2	(Spain) Arantxa Sánchez Vicario	6	6

Semifinals
1	(Germany) Steffi Graf	6	7^{7}
3	(Argentina) Gabriela Sabatini	0	6^{3}
4	(United States) Jennifer Capriati	6	5	0
2	(Spain) Arantxa Sánchez Vicario	2	7	6

Final
1	(Germany) Steffi Graf	7^{10}	6
2	(Spain) Arantxa Sánchez Vicario	6^{8}	1

=== Top half ===
==== Section 1 ====
First round
(United States) D Graham	4	2
(Italy) F Bonsignori	6	6
(United States) K Rinaldi	5	1
(Germany) S Frankl	7	6
Q	(United States) J Watanabe	3	6	7
14	(Netherlands) B Schultz	6	4	5
16	(Croatia) I Majoli	1	4
WC	(United States) L Davenport	6	6
(United States) S Stafford	2	7^{7}	0
(United States) C Rubin	6	6^{2}	6
(Mexico) A Gavaldón	6	7
(Germany) S Meier	4	5

Second round
1	(Germany) S Graf	6	6
(Italy) F Bonsignori	4	4
(Germany) S Frankl	6	6
Q	(United States) J Watanabe	4	1
WC	(United States) L Davenport	4	1
(United States) C Rubin	6	6
(Mexico) A Gavaldón	3	6	6
8	(United States) Z Garrison-Jackson	6	0	2

Third round
1	(Germany) S Graf	6	6
(Germany) S Frankl	1	3
(United States) C Rubin	6	2	6
(Mexico) A Gavaldón	1	6	1

Quarterfinals
1	(Germany) S Graf	6	6
(United States) C Rubin	1	2

==== Section 2 ====
First round
LL	(United States) B Bowes	6	6
(United States) J Santrock	4	3
(Argentina) M Paz	6	2	6^{7}
(Argentina) I Gorrochategui	3	6	7^{9}
WC	(Italy) L Ferrando	4	4
10	(France) J Halard	6	6
12	(Canada) P Hy	7^{7}	6
(United States) T Whitlinger	6^{5}	1
(Netherlands) M Bollegraf	4	7^{7}	7^{7}
LL	(Spain) V Ruano Pascual	6	6^{3}	6^{3}
Q	(Canada) M Drake	6	2	2
(United States) H Helgeson	4	6	6

Second round
3	(Argentina) G Sabatini	6	6
LL	(United States) B Bowes	0	0
(Argentina) I Gorrochategui	6	7
10	(France) J Halard	3	5
12	(Canada) P Hy	6	7
(Netherlands) M Bollegraf	3	5
(United States) H Helgeson	3	5
6	(Bulgaria) K Maleeva	6	7

Third round
3	(Argentina) G Sabatini	6	6
(Argentina) I Gorrochategui	1	4
12	(Canada) P Hy	7	0^{r}
6	(Bulgaria) K Maleeva	5	4

Quarterfinals
3	(Argentina) G Sabatini	6	6
6	(Bulgaria) K Maleeva	4	2

=== Bottom half ===
==== Section 3 ====
First round
(Argentina) B Fulco-Villella	4	2
(Germany) V Martinek	6	6
Q	(Brazil) A Vieira	6	3
(United States) L Harvey Wild	4	1^{r}
Q	(Austria) P Ritter	2	2
11	(Georgia (country)) L Meskhi	6	6
15	(Italy) S Cecchini	6	6
(United States) C Kuhlman	0	3
(Latvia) L Neiland	6	6
(Australia) A Minter	0	4
(Switzerland) C Fauche	2	5
Q	(United States) J Emmons	6	7

Second round
7	(South Africa) A Coetzer	6	6
(Germany) V Martinek	3	2
Q	(Brazil) A Vieira	1	0
11	(Georgia (country)) L Meskhi	6	6
15	(Italy) S Cecchini	4	6	6
(Latvia) L Neiland	6	2	2
Q	(United States) J Emmons	0	2
4	(United States) J Capriati	6	6

Third round
7	(South Africa) A Coetzer	6	6
11	(Georgia (country)) L Meskhi	4	1
15	(Italy) S Cecchini	3	6	4
4	(United States) J Capriati	6	4	6

Quarterfinals
7	(South Africa) A Coetzer	4	0
4	(United States) J Capriati	6	6

==== Section 4 ====
First round
(Germany) S Hack	6	6
LL	(Italy) F Perfetti	1	1
Q	(United States) C MacGregor	4	6	3
Q	(South Africa) J Kruger	6	3	6
(Hungary) A Temesvári	3	2
13	(United States) G Fernández	6	6
9	(Belarus) N Zvereva	4	0^{r}
(Croatia) N Ercegović	6	3
(South Africa) R Fairbank-Nideffer	6	7^{7}
(Argentina) F Labat	2	6^{3}
Q	(Czech Republic) P Langrová	4	6	7^{7}
(France) N van Lottum	6	2	6^{2}

Second round
5	(Switzerland) M Maleeva-Fragnière	6	2	3
(Germany) S Hack	3	6	6
Q	(South Africa) J Kruger	2	1
13	(United States) G Fernández	6	6
(Croatia) N Ercegović	7^{7}	6
(South Africa) R Fairbank-Nideffer	6^{1}	3
Q	(Czech Republic) P Langrová	1	0
2	(Spain) A Sánchez Vicario	6	6

Third round
(Germany) S Hack	6	6
13	(United States) G Fernández	1	4
(Croatia) N Ercegović	2	3
2	(Spain) A Sánchez Vicario	6	6

Quarterfinals
(Germany) S Hack	2	2
2	(Spain) A Sánchez Vicario	6	6
