= 1993 Toray Pan Pacific Open – Doubles =

Doubles
- 1993 Toray Pan Pacific Open

Final
- Champions: (United States) Martina Navratilova; (Czech Republic) Helena Suková
- Runners-up: (United States) Lori McNeil; (Australia) Rennae Stubbs
- Score: 6–4, 6–3

Events
Singles	Doubles
← 1992 ·	Pan Pacific Open	· 1994 →

Arantxa Sánchez Vicario and Helena Suková were the defending champions, but Sánchez Vicario did not compete this year.

Suková teamed up with Martina Navratilova and successfully defended her title, by defeating Lori McNeil and Rennae Stubbs 6–4, 6–3 in the final.

== Seeds ==
1. (United States) Gigi Fernández / (Belarus) Natasha Zvereva (semifinals)
2. (Latvia) Larisa Neiland / (Czech Republic) Jana Novotná (semifinals)
3. (United States) Martina Navratilova / (Czech Republic) Helena Suková (champions)
4. (United States) Lori McNeil / (Australia) Rennae Stubbs (final)

== Draw ==
=== Key ===
- Q = Qualifier
- WC = Wild card
- LL = Lucky loser
- Alt = Alternate
- SE = Special exempt
- PR = Protected ranking
- ITF = ITF entry
- JE = Junior exempt
- w/o = Walkover
- r = Retired
- d = Defaulted
- SR = Special ranking

=== Draw ===
First round

Quarterfinals

Semifinals

Final

1
(United States) G Fernández
(Belarus) N Zvereva
6
6

- (Japan) E Iida
- (Australia) K Radford
1
3

1
(United States) G Fernández
(Belarus) N Zvereva
6
6

- (United States) L Allen
- (United States) A Henricksson
6
2
2

WC
- (Switzerland) M Maleeva-Fragnière
- (Japan) A Sugiyama
3
3

WC
(Switzerland) M Maleeva-Fragnière
(Japan) A Sugiyama
2
6
6

1
- (United States) G Fernández
- (Belarus) N Zvereva
7^{7}
1
2

4
(United States) L McNeil
(Australia) R Stubbs
6
6

4
(United States) L McNeil
(Australia) R Stubbs
6^{3}
6
6

- (Australia) N Provis
- (France) N Tauziat
1
0

4
(United States) L McNeil
(Australia) R Stubbs
6
6

- (Australia) T Morton
- (United States) S Stafford
2
1

- (United States) P Shriver
- (Australia) E Smylie
1
1

(United States) P Shriver
(Australia) E Smylie
6
6

4
- (United States) L McNeil
- (Australia) R Stubbs
4
3

(Japan) R Hiraki
(Netherlands) M Kiene
2
6
6

3
(United States) M Navratilova
(Czech Republic) H Suková
6
6

Q
- (Australia) KA Guse
- (Australia) D Jones
6
2
1

- (Japan) R Hiraki
- (Netherlands) M Kiene
2
6^{2}

- (Japan) K Date
- (Bulgaria) M Maleeva
1
5

3
(United States) M Navratilova
(Czech Republic) H Suková
6
7^{7}

3
(United States) M Navratilova
(Czech Republic) H Suková
6
7

3
(United States) M Navratilova
(Czech Republic) H Suková
6
5
6

(United States) S Collins
(France) M Pierce
1
6
6

2
- (Latvia) L Neiland
- (Czech Republic) J Novotná
2
7
4

- (Australia) M Jaggard-Lai
- (France) P Paradis-Mangon
6
1
3

- (United States) S Collins
- (France) M Pierce
7^{8}
3
3

- (Indonesia) Y Basuki
- (Japan) N Miyagi
4
0

2
(Latvia) L Neiland
(Czech Republic) J Novotná
6^{6}
6
6

2
(Latvia) L Neiland
(Czech Republic) J Novotná
6
6
