= 2008 Rogers Cup – Doubles =

Doubles
- 2008 Rogers Cup

Final
- Champions: (Zimbabwe) Cara Black (United States) Liezel Huber
- Runners-up: (Russia) Maria Kirilenko (Italy) Flavia Pennetta
- Score: 6–1, 6–1

Details
- Draw: 28
- Seeds: 8

Events
Singles	Doubles
- Rogers Cup

Katarina Srebotnik and Ai Sugiyama were the defending champions, but Srebotnik chose not to participate, and only Sugiyama competed that year.
Sugiyama partnered with Ayumi Morita, but lost in the quarterfinals to Květa Peschke and Rennae Stubbs.

Cara Black and Liezel Huber won in the final 6–1, 6–1 against Maria Kirilenko and Flavia Pennetta.

== Seeds ==
The top four seeds received a bye into the second round.

1. (Zimbabwe) Cara Black / (United States) Liezel Huber (champions)
2. (Czech Republic) Květa Peschke / (Australia) Rennae Stubbs (semifinals)
3. (Belarus) Victoria Azarenka / (Israel) Shahar Pe'er (second round, withdrew due to an abdominal strain for Azarenka)
4. (Chinese Taipei) Yung-jan Chan / (United States) Bethanie Mattek (second round, withdrew due to a lower back injury for Mattek)
5. (Belarus) Tatiana Poutchek / (Russia) Anastasia Rodionova (quarterfinals)
6. (United States) Vania King / (Russia) Alla Kudryavtseva (second round)
7. (Russia) Elena Vesnina / (Russia) Vera Zvonareva (semifinals, withdrew due to a left wrist injury for Zvonareva)
8. (Czech Republic) Eva Hrdinová / (Czech Republic) Vladimíra Uhlířová (second round)

== Draw ==
Key

- Q = Qualifier
- WC = Wild card
- LL = Lucky loser
- Alt = Alternate
- ITF = ITF entry
- PR = Protected ranking
- SR = Special ranking
- SE = Special exempt
- JE = Junior exempt
- JR = Junior Accelerator Programme entrant
- CO = College Accelerator Programme entrant
- NG = Next Gen Accelerator Program entrant
- w/o = Walkover
- r = Retired
- d = Defaulted

=== Finals ===
Semifinals
1	(Zimbabwe) Cara Black (United States) Liezel Huber	w/o
7	(Russia) Elena Vesnina (Russia) Vera Zvonareva
(Russia) Maria Kirilenko (Italy) Flavia Pennetta	6	6
2	(Czech Republic) Květa Peschke (Australia) Rennae Stubbs	4	0

Final
1	(Zimbabwe) Cara Black (United States) Liezel Huber	6	6
(Russia) Maria Kirilenko (Italy) Flavia Pennetta	1	1

=== Top half ===
First round
(United States) J Ditty (India) S Uberoi	1	4
(Latvia) L Dekmeijere (United States) A Haynes	6	6
(Bulgaria) S Karatantcheva (United States) N Uberoi	4	3
(Canada) S Dubois (Germany) S Lisicki	6	6
WC	(Canada) G Dabrowski (Canada) S Fichman	1	3
8	(Czech Republic) E Hrdinová (Czech Republic) V Uhlířová	6	6
(Belarus) O Govortsova (Belarus) D Kustova
(Canada) M-È Pelletier (Thailand) T Tanasugarn	w/o
(United Kingdom) K O'Brien (South Africa) C Scheepers	6	5	[8]
ALT	(United Kingdom) A Keothavong (United States) A Stevenson	1	7	[10]
(Australia) M Adamczak (United Kingdom) M South	6^{2}	1
7	(Russia) E Vesnina (Russia) V Zvonareva	7	6

Second round
1	(Zimbabwe) C Black (United States) L Huber	7	6
(Latvia) L Dekmeijere (United States) A Haynes	5	2
(Canada) S Dubois (Germany) S Lisicki	6	7
8	(Czech Republic) E Hrdinová (Czech Republic) V Uhlířová	3	5
3	(Belarus) V Azarenka (Israel) S Pe'er
(Canada) M-È Pelletier (Thailand) T Tanasugarn	w/o
ALT	(United Kingdom) A Keothavong (United States) A Stevenson	3	3
7	(Russia) E Vesnina (Russia) V Zvonareva	6	6

Quarterfinals
1	(Zimbabwe) C Black (United States) L Huber	6	6
(Canada) S Dubois (Germany) S Lisicki	4	1
(Canada) M-È Pelletier (Thailand) T Tanasugarn	3	4
7	(Russia) E Vesnina (Russia) V Zvonareva	6	6

Semifinals
1	(Zimbabwe) C Black (United States) L Huber	w/o
7	(Russia) E Vesnina (Russia) V Zvonareva

=== Bottom half ===
First round
5	(Belarus) T Poutchek (Russia) A Rodionova	6	6
(Russia) A Kleybanova (Romania) M Niculescu	4	0
(Poland) M Domachowska (Russia) N Petrova	6	6
(United States) J Craybas (United States) A Spears	3	2
(Russia) M Kirilenko (Italy) F Pennetta	6	6
(United States) V Lepchenko (United States) L Osterloh	0	3
6	(United States) V King (Russia) A Kudryavtseva	6	6
(Russia) S Kuznetsova (Russia) D Safina	3	4
(Russia) A Jidkova (Japan) A Nakamura	4	0
(Japan) A Morita (Japan) A Sugiyama	6	6
WC	(Canada) M Gloria (Canada) V Tétreault	6	3	[9]
(Hungary) M Czink (Ukraine) O Savchuk	4	6	[11]

Second round
5	(Belarus) T Poutchek (Russia) A Rodionova	6	6
(Poland) M Domachowska (Russia) N Petrova	0	2
(Russia) M Kirilenko (Italy) F Pennetta	w/o
4	(Chinese Taipei) Y-j Chan (United States) B Mattek
6	(United States) V King (Russia) A Kudryavtseva	6	3	[4]
(Japan) A Morita (Japan) A Sugiyama	2	6	[10]
(Hungary) M Czink (Ukraine) O Savchuk
2	(Czech Republic) K Peschke (Australia) R Stubbs	w/o

Quarterfinals
5	(Belarus) T Poutchek (Russia) A Rodionova	7	0	[7]
(Russia) M Kirilenko (Italy) F Pennetta	6^{4}	6	[10]
(Japan) A Morita (Japan) A Sugiyama	5	6^{6}
2	(Czech Republic) K Peschke (Australia) R Stubbs	7	7

Semifinals
(Russia) M Kirilenko (Italy) F Pennetta	6	6
2	(Czech Republic) K Peschke (Australia) R Stubbs	4	0
