= Patti O'Reilly =

American tennis player

- Country (sports): United States
- Born: January 18, 1968 (age 57)
- Plays: Left-handed
- Prize money: $84,962

Singles
- Highest ranking: No. 206 (June 14, 1993)

Grand Slam singles results
- Australian Open: 1R (1992, 1993)

Doubles
- Highest ranking: No. 129 (May 3, 1993)

Grand Slam doubles results
- Australian Open: 1R (1992, 1993)
- French Open: 1R (1993)
- Wimbledon: 1R (1993)
- US Open: 1R (1993)

Patti O'Reilly (born January 18, 1968) is an American former professional tennis player.

== Biography ==
O'Reilly is one of identical triplets, the eldest by 14 minutes to middle triplet Terri and 29 minutes older than sister Christine. The triplets, who had three others siblings, were raised in Ridgewood, New Jersey and graduated from Ridgewood High School in 1986, before moving on to play college tennis together for Duke University, with all three also competing on the WTA Tour.

While at Duke University she was named four times on the All-ACC team and was the ACC Player of the Year in 1990.

A left-handed player, unlike her sisters, O'Reilly was the highest ranked of the trio on the professional tour, peaking at 206 in the world in 1993. She qualified for the Australian Open in both 1992 and 1993. As a doubles player she featured in the main draw of all four grand slam tournaments.

== ITF finals ==
$25,000 tournaments
$10,000 tournaments

=== Singles: 1 (1–0) ===
Result	Date	Tournament	Surface	Opponent	Score
Win	July 3, 1989	Knoxville, United States	Hard	(Canada) Jillian Alexander	6–2, 6–1

=== Doubles: 1 (0–1) ===
Result	Date	Tournament	Surface	Partner	Opponents	Score
Loss	June 17, 1991	St. Simons, United States	Clay	(United States) Christine O'Reilly	(France) Sophie Amiach (United States) Louise Allen	3–6, 7–6^{(5)}, 3–6
