= 1991 WTA Tier I Series =

Women's professional tennis tour

Details
- Duration: March 4 – August 11
- Edition: 2nd
- Tournaments: 6

Achievements (singles)
- Most titles: (Argentina) Gabriela Sabatini (3)
- Most finals: (Argentina) Gabriela Sabatini (4)

The WTA Tier I events are part of the elite tour for professional women's tennis organised by the WTA called the WTA Tour.

== Tournaments ==
Tournament	Country	Location	Surface	Date	Prize money
Virginia Slims of Florida	United States	Boca Raton	Hard	Mar 4 – 17	$500,000
Lipton International Players Championships	United States	Key Biscayne	Hard	Mar 18 – 24	$750,000
Family Circle Cup	United States	Hilton Head Island	Clay	Apr 1 – 7	$500,000
Peugeot Italian Open	Italy	Rome	Clay	May 6 – 12	$500,000
Lufthansa Cup	Germany	Berlin	Clay	May 13 – 19	$500,000
Canadian Open	Canada	Toronto	Hard	Aug 5 – 11	$500,000

== Results ==
* First-time champion

Tournament	Singles champions	Runners-up	Score	Doubles champions	Runners-up	Score
Boca Raton Singles – Doubles	(Argentina) Gabriela Sabatini*	(Germany) Steffi Graf	6–4, 7–6^{(8–6)}	(Soviet Union) Larisa Savchenko-Neiland* (Soviet Union) Natasha Zvereva*	(United States) Meredith McGrath (United States) Anne Smith	6–4, 7–6 ^{(7–3)}
Miami Singles – Doubles	(Socialist Federal Republic of Yugoslavia) Monica Seles	(Argentina) Gabriela Sabatini	6–3, 7–5	(United States) Mary Joe Fernández* (United States) Zina Garrison*	(United States) Gigi Fernández (Czechoslovakia) Jana Novotná	6–4, 6–3
Hilton Head Singles – Doubles	(Argentina) Gabriela Sabatini	(Soviet Union) Leila Meskhi	6–1, 6–1	(Germany) Claudia Kohde-Kilsch*	(United States) Mary-Lou Daniels (South Africa) Lise Gregory	6–4, 6–0
Hilton Head Singles – Doubles	(Argentina) Gabriela Sabatini	(Soviet Union) Leila Meskhi	6–1, 6–1	(Soviet Union) Natasha Zvereva	(United States) Mary-Lou Daniels (South Africa) Lise Gregory	6–4, 6–0
Rome Singles – Doubles	(Argentina) Gabriela Sabatini	(Socialist Federal Republic of Yugoslavia) Monica Seles	6–3, 6–2	(United States) Jennifer Capriati*	(Australia) Nicole Provis (South Africa) Elna Reinach	7–5, 6–2
Rome Singles – Doubles	(Argentina) Gabriela Sabatini	(Socialist Federal Republic of Yugoslavia) Monica Seles	6–3, 6–2	(Socialist Federal Republic of Yugoslavia) Monica Seles	(Australia) Nicole Provis (South Africa) Elna Reinach	7–5, 6–2
Berlin Singles – Doubles	(Germany) Steffi Graf	(Spain) Arantxa Sánchez Vicario	6–3, 4–6, 7–6^{(8–6)}	(Soviet Union) Larisa Neiland (Soviet Union) Natasha Zvereva	(Australia) Nicole Provis (South Africa) Elna Reinach	6–3, 6–3
Toronto Singles – Doubles	(United States) Jennifer Capriati*	(Bulgaria) Katerina Maleeva	6–2, 6–3	(Soviet Union) Larisa Neiland (Soviet Union) Natasha Zvereva	(Germany) Claudia Kohde-Kilsch (Czechoslovakia) Helena Suková	1–6, 7–5, 6–2

== See also ==
- WTA Tier I events
- 1991 WTA Tour
- 1991 ATP Championship Series, Single Week
- 1991 ATP Tour
