= 1991 ATP Championship Series, Single Week =

Men's professional tennis tour

Details
- Duration: March 4 – November 3
- Edition: 2nd
- Tournaments: 9

Achievements (singles)
- Most titles: (United States) Jim Courier (France) Guy Forget (2)
- Most finals: (France) Guy Forget (3)

The 1991 ATP Championship Series, Single Week was a series of tennis tournament that was part of the 1991 ATP Tour, the elite tour for professional men's tennis organised by the Association of Tennis Professionals. It formed the tier below the Grand Slam tournaments.

== Results ==
* First-time champion

| Masters | Singles champions | Runners-up | Score | Doubles champions | Runners-up | Score |
|---|---|---|---|---|---|---|
| Indian Wells Singles – Doubles | (United States) Jim Courier* | (France) Guy Forget | 4–6, 6–3, 4–6, 6–3, 7–6^{(7–4)} | (United States) Jim Courier | (France) Guy Forget (France) Henri Leconte | 7–6, 6–1 |
| Indian Wells Singles – Doubles | (United States) Jim Courier* | (France) Guy Forget | 4–6, 6–3, 4–6, 6–3, 7–6^{(7–4)} | (Spain) Javier Sánchez* | (France) Guy Forget (France) Henri Leconte | 7–6, 6–1 |
| Miami Singles – Doubles | (United States) Jim Courier | (United States) David Wheaton | 4–6, 6–3, 6–4 | (South Africa) Wayne Ferreira* (South Africa) Piet Norval* | (United States) Ken Flach (United States) Robert Seguso | 5–7, 7–6, 6–2 |
| Monte Carlo Singles – Doubles | (Spain) Sergi Bruguera* | (Germany) Boris Becker | 5–7, 6–4, 7–6^{(8–6)}, 7–6^{(7–4)} | (United States) Luke Jensen* (Australia) Laurie Warder* | (Netherlands) Paul Haarhuis (Netherlands) Mark Koevermans | 6–4, 6–3 |
| Hamburg Singles – Doubles | (Czechoslovakia) Karel Nováček* | (Sweden) Magnus Gustafsson | 6–3, 6–3, 5–7, 0–6, 6–1 | (Spain) Sergio Casal (Spain) Emilio Sánchez | (Brazil) Cássio Motta (South Africa) Danie Visser | 7–6, 7–6 |
| Rome Singles – Doubles | (Spain) Emilio Sánchez* | (Argentina) Alberto Mancini | 6–3, 6–1, 3–0 ret. | (Italy) Omar Camporese* (Croatia) Goran Ivanišević* | (United States) Luke Jensen (Australia) Laurie Warder | 6–2, 6–3 |
| Montreal Singles – Doubles | (Soviet Union) Andrei Chesnokov | (Czechoslovakia) Petr Korda | 3–6, 6–4, 6–3 | (United States) Patrick Galbraith* (United States) Todd Witsken* | (Canada) Grant Connell (Canada) Glenn Michibata | 6–4, 3–6, 6–1 |
| Cincinnati Singles – Doubles | (France) Guy Forget* | (United States) Pete Sampras | 2–6, 7–6^{(7–4)}, 6–4 | (United States) Ken Flach* (United States) Robert Seguso* | (Canada) Grant Connell (Canada) Glenn Michibata | 6–3, 6–4 |
| Stockholm Singles – Doubles | (Germany) Boris Becker | (Sweden) Stefan Edberg | 3–6, 6–4, 1–6, 6–2, 6–2 | (Australia) John Fitzgerald* (Sweden) Anders Järryd* | (Netherlands) Tom Nijssen (Czechoslovakia) Cyril Suk | 7–5, 6–3 |
| Paris Singles – Doubles | (France) Guy Forget | (United States) Pete Sampras | 7–6^{(11–9)}, 4–6, 5–7, 6–4, 6–4 | (Australia) John Fitzgerald (Sweden) Anders Järryd | (United States) Kelly Jones (United States) Rick Leach | 7–6, 6–4 |

== Tournament details ==
Key

- Q = Qualifier
- WC = Wild card
- LL = Lucky loser
- Alt = Alternate
- ITF = ITF entry
- PR = Protected ranking
- SR = Special ranking
- SE = Special exempt
- JE = Junior exempt
- JR = Junior Accelerator Programme entrant
- CO = College Accelerator Programme entrant
- NG = Next Gen Accelerator Program entrant
- w/o = Walkover
- r = Retired
- d = Defaulted

=== Indian Wells ===
| Tournament name | Newsweek Champions Cup |
| Dates | March 4 – 10 |
| Surface | Hard (outdoors) |
| Location | Indian Wells, California, United States |

==== Singles ====
Quarterfinals
1 | (Sweden) Stefan Edberg | 1 | 6 | 7
15 | (United States) Michael Chang | 6 | 2 | 5
3 | (France) Guy Forget | 7 | 6
(United States) Scott Davis | 5 | 1
11 | (Germany) Michael Stich | 6 | 2 | 6
(United States) Richey Reneberg | 0 | 6 | 4
7 | (Spain) Emilio Sánchez | 2 | 2
16 | (United States) Jim Courier | 6 | 6

Semifinals
1 | (Sweden) Stefan Edberg | 4 | 4
3 | (France) Guy Forget | 6 | 6
11 | (Germany) Michael Stich | 3 | 2
16 | (United States) Jim Courier | 6 | 6

Final
3 | (France) Guy Forget | 6 | 3 | 6 | 3 | 6^{4}
16 | (United States) Jim Courier | 4 | 6 | 4 | 6 | 7^{7}

==== Doubles ====
Semifinals
(United States) Jim Courier (Spain) Javier Sánchez | 6 | 4 | 6
(Australia) John Fitzgerald (United States) Kelly Jones | 4 | 6 | 3
(France) Guy Forget (France) Henri Leconte | 6 | 6
8 | (United States) Jim Grabb (South Africa) Gary Muller | 3 | 3

Final
(United States) Jim Courier (Spain) Javier Sánchez | 7^{7} | 3 | 6
(France) Guy Forget (France) Henri Leconte | 6^{1} | 6 | 3

=== Key Biscayne ===
| Tournament name | Lipton International Players Championships |
| Dates | March 15 – 24 |
| Surface | Hard (outdoors) |
| Location | Key Biscayne, Florida, United States |

==== Singles ====
Quarterfinals
1 | (Sweden) Stefan Edberg | 6 | 7^{8}
7 | (Spain) Emilio Sánchez | 2 | 6^{6}
(United States) David Wheaton | 6^{7} | 6 | 6
28 | (Italy) Cristiano Caratti | 7^{9} | 2 | 0
22 | (United States) Derrick Rostagno | 0 | 3
13 | (United States) Jim Courier | 6 | 6
24 | (United States) Richey Reneberg | 7^{7} | 3 | 6
17 | (Switzerland) Marc Rosset | 6^{3} | 6 | 3

Semifinals
1 | (Sweden) Stefan Edberg | 3 | 4
(United States) David Wheaton | 6 | 6
13 | (United States) Jim Courier | 6 | 6
24 | (United States) Richey Reneberg | 4 | 3

Final
(United States) David Wheaton | 6 | 3 | 4
13 | (United States) Jim Courier | 4 | 6 | 6

==== Doubles ====
Semifinals
(South Africa) Wayne Ferreira (South Africa) Piet Norval | 6 | 4 | 6
13 | (Australia) Jason Stoltenberg (United States) David Wheaton | 4 | 6 | 3
14 | (United Kingdom) Neil Broad (United States) Kevin Curren | 5 | 7 | 3
(United States) Ken Flach (United States) Robert Seguso | 7 | 5 | 6

Final
(South Africa) Wayne Ferreira (South Africa) Piet Norval | 5 | 7^{7} | 6
(United States) Ken Flach (United States) Robert Seguso | 7 | 6^{3} | 2

=== Monte Carlo ===
| Tournament name | Monte Carlo Open |
| Dates | April 22 – 28 |
| Surface | Clay (outdoors) |
| Location | Roquebrune-Cap-Martin, France |

==== Singles ====
Quarterfinals
(Sweden) Magnus Gustafsson | 5 | 5
9 | (Spain) Sergi Bruguera | 7 | 7
(Austria) Horst Skoff | 6 | 6
6 | (Sweden) Jonas Svensson | 3 | 3
WC | (Germany) Carl-Uwe Steeb | 4 | 2
(Socialist Federal Republic of Yugoslavia) Goran Prpić | 6 | 6
8 | (Soviet Union) Andrei Chesnokov | 1 | 3
2 | (Germany) Boris Becker | 6 | 6

Semifinals
9 | (Spain) Sergi Bruguera | 6 | 6
(Austria) Horst Skoff | 1 | 4
(Socialist Federal Republic of Yugoslavia) Goran Prpić | 3 | 3
2 | (Germany) Boris Becker | 6 | 6

Final
9 | (Spain) Sergi Bruguera | 5 | 6 | 7^{8} | 7^{7}
2 | (Germany) Boris Becker | 7 | 4 | 6^{6} | 6^{4}

==== Doubles ====
Semifinals
1 | (Spain) Sergio Casal (Spain) Emilio Sánchez | 6 | 1 | 6
4 | (Netherlands) Paul Haarhuis (Netherlands) Mark Koevermans | 1 | 6 | 7
3 | (United States) Patrick Galbraith (United States) Todd Witsken | 4 | 1
(United States) Luke Jensen (Australia) Laurie Warder | 6 | 6

Final
4 | (Netherlands) Paul Haarhuis (Netherlands) Mark Koevermans | 7 | 6^{3} | 4
(United States) Luke Jensen (Australia) Laurie Warder | 5 | 7^{7} | 6

=== Hamburg ===
| Tournament name | ATP German Open |
| Dates | May 6 – 12 |
| Surface | Clay (outdoors) |
| Location | Hamburg, Germany |

==== Singles ====
Quarterfinal
1 | (Sweden) Stefan Edberg | 2 | 6^{4}
9 | (Germany) Michael Stich | 6 | 7^{7}
13 | (Czechoslovakia) Karel Nováček | 4 | 6 | 6
(Netherlands) Mark Koevermans | 6 | 4 | 2
(Socialist Federal Republic of Yugoslavia) Goran Prpić | 7 | 3
4 | (Socialist Federal Republic of Yugoslavia) Goran Ivanišević | 5 | 0^{r}
(Sweden) Magnus Gustafsson | 6 | 6
WC | (France) Yannick Noah | 1 | 4

Semifinal
9 | (Germany) Michael Stich | 3 | 6 | 6^{5}
13 | (Czechoslovakia) Karel Nováček | 6 | 2 | 7^{7}
(Socialist Federal Republic of Yugoslavia) Goran Prpić | 2 | 6 | 6^{4}
(Sweden) Magnus Gustafsson | 6 | 1 | 7^{7}

Final
13 | (Czechoslovakia) Karel Nováček | 6 | 6 | 5 | 0 | 6
(Sweden) Magnus Gustafsson | 3 | 3 | 7 | 6 | 1

==== Doubles ====
Semifinal
1 | (Spain) Sergio Casal (Spain) Emilio Sánchez | 6 | 6
5 | (Spain) Sergi Bruguera (United States) Jim Courier | 3 | 3
(Argentina) Gustavo Luza (Spain) Javier Sánchez | 4 | 4
8 | (Brazil) Cássio Motta (South Africa) Danie Visser | 6 | 6

Final
1 | (Spain) Sergio Casal (Spain) Emilio Sánchez | 4 | 6 | 6
8 | (Brazil) Cássio Motta (South Africa) Danie Visser | 6 | 3 | 2

=== Rome ===
| Tournament name | Peugeot Italian Open |
| Dates | May 13 – 19 |
| Surface | Clay (outdoors) |
| Location | Rome, Italy |

==== Singles ====
Quarterfinals
(Australia) Richard Fromberg | 2 | 2
9 | (Spain) Emilio Sánchez | 6 | 6
(Socialist Federal Republic of Yugoslavia) Goran Prpić | 7^{7} | 7
11 | (Soviet Union) Andrei Cherkasov | 6^{3} | 5
5 | (Spain) Sergi Bruguera | 6 | 7^{7}
(France) Fabrice Santoro | 4 | 6^{1}
Q | (Argentina) Alberto Mancini | 6 | 6
(Argentina) Horacio de la Peña | 4 | 2

Semifinals
9 | (Spain) Emilio Sánchez | 6 | 6
(Socialist Federal Republic of Yugoslavia) Goran Prpić | 4 | 2
5 | (Spain) Sergi Bruguera | 3 | 1
Q | (Argentina) Alberto Mancini | 6 | 6

Final
9 | (Spain) Emilio Sánchez | 6 | 6 | 3
Q | (Argentina) Alberto Mancini | 3 | 1 | 0^{r}

==== Doubles ====
Semifinals
(Italy) Omar Camporese (Socialist Federal Republic of Yugoslavia) Goran Ivanišević | 4 | 6 | 6
(Australia) Pat Cash (Switzerland) Jakob Hlasek | 6 | 3 | 0
(Argentina) Gustavo Luza (Brazil) Cássio Motta | 6 | 4 | 4
7 | (United States) Luke Jensen (Australia) Laurie Warder | 3 | 6 | 6

Final
(Italy) Omar Camporese (Socialist Federal Republic of Yugoslavia) Goran Ivanišević | 6 | 6
7 | (United States) Luke Jensen (Australia) Laurie Warder | 2 | 3

=== Montreal ===
| Tournament name | Canadian Open |
| Dates | July 22 – 28 |
| Surface | Hard (outdoors) |
| Location | Montreal, Quebec, Canada |

==== Singles ====
Quarterfinals
1 | (Czechoslovakia) Ivan Lendl | 7^{10} | 6^{7} | 7
(United States) Jim Grabb | 6^{8} | 7^{9} | 5
(Japan) Shuzo Matsuoka | 2 | 6 | 5
12 | (Soviet Union) Andrei Cherkasov | 6 | 3 | 7
6 | (Switzerland) Jakob Hlasek | 6^{3} | 4
(Czechoslovakia) Petr Korda | 7^{7} | 6
10 | (United States) Derrick Rostagno | 3 | 3
2 | (United States) Jim Courier | 6 | 6

Semifinals
1 | (Czechoslovakia) Ivan Lendl | 6^{4} | 5
12 | (Soviet Union) Andrei Chesnokov | 7^{7} | 7
(Czechoslovakia) Petr Korda | 3 | 7^{7} | 6
2 | (United States) Jim Courier | 6 | 6^{1} | 2

Final
12 | (Soviet Union) Andrei Chesnokov | 3 | 6 | 6
(Czechoslovakia) Petr Korda | 6 | 4 | 3

==== Doubles ====
Semifinals
8 | (United States) Ken Flach (United States) Robert Seguso | 4 | 4
3 | (United States) Patrick Galbraith (United States) Todd Witsken | 6 | 6
6 | (Australia) Wally Masur (Australia) Mark Woodforde | 3 | 6 | 3
2 | (Canada) Grant Connell (Canada) Glenn Michibata | 6 | 3 | 6

Final
3 | (United States) Patrick Galbraith (United States) Todd Witsken | 6 | 3 | 6
2 | (Canada) Grant Connell (Canada) Glenn Michibata | 4 | 6 | 1

=== Cincinnati ===
| Tournament name | Thriftway ATP Championships |
| Dates | August 5 – 11 |
| Surface | Hard (outdoors) |
| Location | Mason, Ohio, United States |

==== Singles ====
Quarterfinals
1/WC | (Germany) Boris Becker | 7^{9} | 6
10 | (Soviet Union) Andrei Cherkasov | 6^{7} | 3
14 | (United States) Derrick Rostagno | 6^{6} | 4
6 | (France) Guy Forget | 7^{8} | 6
12 | (United States) Brad Gilbert | 3 | 3
4 | (United States) Jim Courier | 6 | 6
7 | (United States) Pete Sampras | 6 | 6
2 | (Sweden) Stefan Edberg | 3 | 3

Semifinals
1/WC | (Germany) Boris Becker | 6^{1} | 6 | 3
6 | (France) Guy Forget | 7^{7} | 4 | 6
4 | (United States) Jim Courier | 2 | 5
7 | (United States) Pete Sampras | 6 | 7

Final
6 | (France) Guy Forget | 2 | 7^{7} | 6
7 | (United States) Pete Sampras | 6 | 6^{4} | 4

==== Doubles ====
Semifinals
(United States) Ken Flach (United States) Robert Seguso | 3
Q | (Australia) Neil Borwick (Australia) Simon Youl | 2^{r}
3 | (Canada) Grant Connell (Canada) Glenn Michibata | 6 | 7
2 | (United States) Scott Davis (United States) David Pate | 3 | 5

Final
(United States) Ken Flach (United States) Robert Seguso | 6^{3} | 6 | 7
3 | (Canada) Grant Connell (Canada) Glenn Michibata | 7^{7} | 4 | 5

=== Stockholm ===
| Tournament name | Stockholm Open |
| Dates | October 21 – 27 |
| Surface | Carpet (indoors) |
| Location | Stockholm, Sweden |

==== Singles ====
Quarterfinals
1 | (Sweden) Stefan Edberg | 6 | 2 | 6
(United States) Richey Reneberg | 3 | 6 | 3
(United States) Aaron Krickstein | 7^{10} | 1
12 | (Croatia) Goran Ivanišević | 6^{8} | 0^{r}
11 | (Czechoslovakia) Petr Korda | 4 | 4
3 | (United States) Jim Courier | 6 | 6
7 | (United States) Pete Sampras | 5 | 5
2 | (Germany) Boris Becker | 7 | 7

Semifinals
1 | (Sweden) Stefan Edberg | 6 | 6
(United States) Aaron Krickstein | 2 | 2
3 | (United States) Jim Courier | 7^{7} | 3 | 4
2 | (Germany) Boris Becker | 6^{4} | 6 | 6

Final
1 | (Sweden) Stefan Edberg | 6 | 4 | 6 | 2 | 2
2 | (Germany) Boris Becker | 3 | 6 | 1 | 6 | 6

==== Doubles ====
Semifinals
1 | (Australia) John Fitzgerald (Sweden) Anders Järryd | 6 | 6
5 | (United States) Patrick Galbraith (United States) Todd Witsken | 3 | 2
6 | (United States) Luke Jensen (Australia) Laurie Warder | 4 | 6 | 6
(Netherlands) Tom Nijssen (Czechoslovakia) Cyril Suk | 6 | 3 | 7

Final
1 | (Australia) John Fitzgerald (Sweden) Anders Järryd | 7 | 6
(Netherlands) Tom Nijssen (Czechoslovakia) Cyril Suk | 5 | 2

=== Paris ===
| Tournament name | Paris Open |
| Dates | October 28 – November 3 |
| Surface | Carpet (indoors) |
| Location | Paris, France |

==== Singles ====
Quarterfinals
16 | (United States) Michael Chang | 7 | 6
9 | (Czechoslovakia) Petr Korda | 5 | 1
(Soviet Union) Alexander Volkov | 2 | 3
6 | (United States) Pete Sampras | 6 | 6
5 | (France) Guy Forget | 6 | 3 | 6
(Italy) Omar Camporese | 1 | 6 | 3
8 | (Czechoslovakia) Karel Nováček | 4 | 2
(Sweden) Jonas Svensson | 6 | 6

Semifinals
16 | (United States) Michael Chang | 6 | 4 | 3
6 | (United States) Pete Sampras | 2 | 6 | 6
5 | (France) Guy Forget | 7 | 6
(Sweden) Jonas Svensson | 5 | 4

Final
6 | (United States) Pete Sampras | 6^{9} | 6 | 7 | 4 | 4
5 | (France) Guy Forget | 7^{11} | 4 | 5 | 6 | 6

==== Doubles ====
Semifinals
1 | (Australia) John Fitzgerald (Sweden) Anders Järryd | 6 | 6
6 | (United States) Patrick Galbraith (United States) Todd Witsken | 3 | 3
5 | (United States) Ken Flach (United States) Robert Seguso | 7 | 6 | 5
(United States) Kelly Jones (United States) Rick Leach | 5 | 7 | 7

Final
1 | (Australia) John Fitzgerald (Sweden) Anders Järryd | 3 | 6 | 6
(United States) Kelly Jones (United States) Rick Leach | 6 | 3 | 2

== Titles won by player ==
=== Singles ===
| # | Player | IN | MI | MO | HA | RO | CA | CI | ST | PA | # | Winning span |
|---|---|---|---|---|---|---|---|---|---|---|---|---|
| 1 | (Sweden) Stefan Edberg | 1 | - | - | - | - | - | 1 | - | 1 | 3 | 1990 |
| 2 | (Germany) Boris Becker | - | - | - | - | - | - | - | 2 | - | 2 | 1990 |
| = | (Soviet Union) Andrei Chesnokov | - | - | 1 | - | - | 1 | - | - | - | 2 | 1990–1991 (2) |
| = | (United States) Jim Courier | 1 | 1 | - | - | - | - | - | - | - | 2 | 1991 |
| = | (France) Guy Forget | - | - | - | - | - | - | 1 | - | 1 | 2 | 1991 |
| 6 | (United States) Andre Agassi | - | 1 | - | - | - | - | - | - | - | 1 | 1990 |
| = | (Spain) Juan Aguilera | - | - | - | 1 | - | - | - | - | - | 1 | 1990 |
| = | (Spain) Sergi Bruguera | - | - | 1 | - | - | - | - | - | - | 1 | 1991 |
| = | (United States) Michael Chang | - | - | - | - | - | 1 | - | - | - | 1 | 1990 |
| = | (Austria) Thomas Muster | - | - | - | - | 1 | - | - | - | - | 1 | 1990 |
| = | (Spain) Emilio Sánchez | - | - | - | - | 1 | - | - | - | - | 1 | 1991 |
| = | (Czechoslovakia) Karel Nováček | - | - | - | 1 | - | - | - | - | - | 1 | 1991 |

== See also ==
- ATP Tour Masters 1000
- 1991 ATP Tour
- 1991 WTA Tier I Series
- 1991 WTA Tour
