= Jennifer Capriati career statistics =

Career finals
| Discipline | Type | Won | Lost | Total |
|---|---|---|---|---|
| Singles | Grand Slam | 3 | 0 | 3 |
| Singles | Summer Olympics | 1 | 0 | 1 |
| Singles | WTA Finals (Note: Formerly known as: Virginia Slims Championships (until 1995); WTA Tour Championships (until 2014)) | – | – | – |
| Singles | WTA 1000 (Note: Formerly known as: Category 4 & 5 & 6 (until 1990); Tier I (until 2009); WTA Premier Mandatory and 5 (until 2021)) | 2 | 9 | 11 |
| Singles | WTA 500 (Note: Formerly known as: Category 3 (until 1990); Tier II (until 2009); WTA Premier (until 2021)) | 3 | 6 | 9 |
| Singles | WTA 250 (Note: Formerly known as: Category 1 & 2 (until 1990); Tier III & IV & V (until 2009); WTA International (until 2021)) | 5 | 2 | 7 |
| Singles | Total | 14 | 17 | 31 |
| Doubles | Grand Slam | – | – | – |
| Doubles | Summer Olympics | – | – | – |
| Doubles | WTA Finals | – | – | – |
| Doubles | WTA 1000 | 1 | 0 | 1 |
| Doubles | WTA 500 | 0 | 1 | 1 |
| Doubles | WTA 250 | – | – | – |
| Doubles | Total | 1 | 1 | 2 |
| Total | | 15 | 18 | 33 |

This is a list of the main career statistics of tennis player Jennifer Capriati.

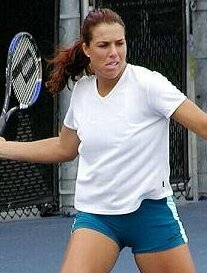
Capriati in 2003

== Performance timeline ==
Key
| W | F | SF | QF | #R | RR | Q# | P# | DNQ | A | Z# | PO | G | S | B | NMS | NTI | P | NH |

(W) winner; (F) finalist; (SF) semifinalist; (QF) quarterfinalist; (#R) rounds 4, 3, 2, 1; (RR) round-robin stage; (Q#) qualification round; (P#) preliminary round; (DNQ) did not qualify; (A) absent; (Z#) Davis/Fed Cup Zonal Group (with number indication) or (PO) play-off; (G) gold, (S) silver or (B) bronze Olympic/Paralympic medal; (NMS) not a Masters tournament; (NTI) not a Tier I tournament; (P) postponed; (NH) not held; (SR) strike rate (events won / competed); (W–L) win–loss record.
To avoid confusion and double counting, these charts are updated at the conclusion of a tournament or when the player's participation has ended.

Only main-draw results in WTA Tour, Grand Slam tournaments, Billie Jean King Cup (Fed Cup), Hopman Cup and Olympic Games are included in win–loss records.

=== Singles ===
| Tournament | 1990 | 1991 | 1992 | 1993 | 1994 | 1995 | 1996 | 1997 | 1998 | 1999 | 2000 | 2001 | 2002 | 2003 | 2004 | SR | W–L | W% |
|---|---|---|---|---|---|---|---|---|---|---|---|---|---|---|---|---|---|---|
Grand Slam tournaments
| Australian Open | A | A | QF | QF | A | A | A | 1R | A | 2R | SF | W | W | 1R | A | 2 / 8 | 28–6 | 82% |
| French Open | SF | 4R | QF | QF | A | A | 1R | A | A | 4R | 1R | W | SF | 4R | SF | 1 / 11 | 39–10 | 80% |
| Wimbledon | 4R | SF | QF | QF | A | A | A | A | 2R | 2R | 4R | SF | QF | QF | QF | 0 / 11 | 38–11 | 78% |
| US Open | 4R | SF | 3R | 1R | A | A | 1R | 1R | 1R | 4R | 4R | SF | QF | SF | SF | 0 / 13 | 35–13 | 73% |
| Win–loss | 11–3 | 13–3 | 14–4 | 12–4 | 0–0 | 0–0 | 0–2 | 0–2 | 1–2 | 8–4 | 11–4 | 24–2 | 20–3 | 12–4 | 14–3 | 3 / 43 | 140–40 | 78% |
Year-end championship
| WTA Finals | 1R | QF | QF | A | did not qualify | | | | | | 1R | QF | SF | SF | Alt | 0 / 7 | 7–8 | 47% |
WTA 1000 + former^{†} tournaments
| Indian Wells Open | NMS | | | | | | 3R | A | A | A | 2R | A | A | SF | A | 0 / 3 | 6–3 | |
| Miami Open | 4R | QF | SF | 3R | A | A | 4R | 2R | 1R | 2R | QF | F | F | F | 3R | 0 / 13 | 33–13 | |
| Berlin / Madrid Open (Note: In 2009, the Berlin Open was replaced by the Madrid Open. The Premier Mandatory tournaments were reclassified as WTA 1000 tournaments in 2021.) | a | SF | SF | 3R | A | A | A | A | 1R | 2R | A | F | SF | SF | SF | 0 / 9 | 21–9 | |
| Italian Open | QF | QF | 3R | QF | A | A | A | 1R | 1R | A | 1R | 2R | SF | QF | F | 0 / 11 | 17–11 | |
| Canadian Open | QF | W | A | F | A | A | 3R | 2R | A | 3R | 3R | F | F | A | QF | 1 / 10 | 27–9 | |
| Virginia Slims of Florida | NMS | SF | A | NH/NMS | | | | | | | | | | | | 0 / 1 | 3–1 | |
| Charleston Open^{†} | F | 3R | 2R | SF | A | A | A | 3R | 1R | A | A | W | SF | A | 3R | 1 / 9 | 20–8 | |
| Philadelphia Championships | NH/NMS | | | A | 1R | A | NH/NMS | | | | | | | | | 0 / 1 | 0–1 | |
| Kremlin Cup^{†} | NH/NMS | | | | | | | A | A | A | A | A | A | 2R | A | 0 / 1 | 0–1 | |
| Zurich Open^{†} | NMS | | | A | A | A | QF | Q1 | A | 1R | SF | SF | 2R | A | A | 0 / 5 | 7–5 | |
| Win–loss | 13–4 | 16–5 | 8–4 | 10–5 | 0–1 | 0–0 | 9–4 | 3–4 | 0–4 | 4–4 | 8–5 | 20–5 | 18–6 | 14–5 | 11–5 | 2 / 63 | 134–61 | |
Career statistics
| Year-end ranking | 8 | 6 | 7 | 9 | n/a | n/a | 36 | 66 | 101 | 23 | 14 | 2 | 3 | 6 | 10 | $10,206,639 | | |

== Significant finals ==
=== Grand Slams ===
==== Singles: 3 (3 titles) ====
| Result | Year | Championship | Surface | Opponent | Score |
|---|---|---|---|---|---|
| Win | 2001 | Australian Open | Hard | (Switzerland) Martina Hingis | 6–4, 6–3 |
| Win | 2001 | French Open | Clay | (Belgium) Kim Clijsters | 1–6, 6–4, 12–10 |
| Win | 2002 | Australian Open (2) | Hard | (Switzerland) Martina Hingis | 4–6, 7–6^{(9–7)}, 6–2 |

=== Olympics ===
==== Singles: 1 (1 title) ====
| Result | Year | Tournament | Surface | Opponent | Score |
|---|---|---|---|---|---|
| Gold | 1992 | Barcelona Olympics | Clay | (Germany) Steffi Graf | 3–6, 6–3, 6–4 |

=== WTA 1000 ===
==== Singles: 11 (2 titles, 9 runner-ups) ====
| Result | Year | Tournament | Surface | Opponent | Score |
|---|---|---|---|---|---|
| Loss | 1990 | Charleston Open | Clay | (United States) Martina Navratilova | 2–6, 4–6 |
| Win | 1991 | Canadian Open | Hard | (Bulgaria) Katerina Maleeva | 6–2, 6–3 |
| Loss | 1993 | Canadian Open | Hard | (Germany) Steffi Graf | 1–6, 6–0, 3–6 |
| Loss | 2001 | Miami Open | Hard | (United States) Venus Williams | 6–4, 1–6, 6–7^{(4–7)} |
| Win | 2001 | Charleston Open | Clay | (Switzerland) Martina Hingis | 6–0, 4–6, 6–4 |
| Loss | 2001 | German Open | Clay | (France) Amélie Mauresmo | 4–6, 6–2, 3–6 |
| Loss | 2001 | Canadian Open | Hard | (United States) Serena Williams | 1–6, 7–6^{(9–7)}, 3–6 |
| Loss | 2002 | Miami Open | Hard | (United States) Serena Williams | 5–7, 6–7^{(4–7)} |
| Loss | 2002 | Canadian Open | Hard | (France) Amélie Mauresmo | 4–6, 1–6 |
| Loss | 2003 | Miami Open | Hard | (United States) Serena Williams | 6–4, 4–6, 1–6 |
| Loss | 2004 | Italian Open | Clay | (France) Amélie Mauresmo | 6–3, 3–6, 6–7^{(6–8)} |

==== Doubles: 1 (1 title) ====
| Result | Year | Championship | Surface | Partner | Opponent | Score |
|---|---|---|---|---|---|---|
| Win | 1991 | Italian Open | Clay | (Socialist Federal Republic of Yugoslavia) Monica Seles | (Australia) Nicole Bradtke (South Africa) Elna Reinach | 7–5, 6–2 |

== WTA Tour finals ==
=== Singles (14 titles, 17 runner-ups) ===
| Legend Grand Slam tournaments (3–0) Olympic Games (1–0) WTA 1000 (Tier I) (2–9) WTA 500 (Tier II) (3–6) WTA 250 (Tier III / Tier IV) (5–2) | by surface Hard (8–11) Grass (0–0) Clay (4–3) Carpet (2–3) | Finals by setting Outdoor (12–13) Indoor (2–4) |

| Result | W–L | Date | Tournament | Tier | Surface | Opponent | Score |
|---|---|---|---|---|---|---|---|
| Loss | 0–1 | Mar 1990 | Virginia Slims of Florida, United States | Tier II | Hard | (Argentina) Gabriela Sabatini | 4–6, 5–7 |
| Loss | 0–2 | Apr 1990 | Charleston Open, United States | Tier I | Clay | (United States) Martina Navratilova | 2–6, 4–6 |
| Win | 1–2 | Oct 1990 | Puerto Rico Open, United States | Tier IV | Hard | (United States) Zina Garrison | 5–7, 6–4, 6–2 |
| Win | 2–2 | Jul 1991 | Southern California Open, United States | Tier II | Hard | (Socialist Federal Republic of Yugoslavia) Monica Seles | 4–6, 6–1, 7–6^{(7–2)} |
| Win | 3–2 | Aug 1991 | Canadian Open, Canada | Tier I | Hard | (Bulgaria) Katerina Maleeva | 6–2, 6–3 |
| Loss | 3–3 | Nov 1991 | Philadelphia Championships, United States | Tier II | Carpet (i) | (Socialist Federal Republic of Yugoslavia) Monica Seles | 5–7, 1–6 |
| Win | 4–3 | Jul 1992 | Barcelona Summer Olympics, Spain | Olympics | Clay | (Germany) Steffi Graf | 3–6, 6–3, 6–4 |
| Win | 5–3 | Aug 1992 | Southern California Open, United States | Tier III | Hard | (Spain) Conchita Martínez | 6–3, 6–2 |
| Win | 6–3 | Jan 1993 | Sydney International, Australia | Tier II | Hard | (Germany) Anke Huber | 6–1, 6–4 |
| Loss | 6–4 | Aug 1993 | Canadian Open, Canada | Tier I | Hard | (Germany) Steffi Graf | 1–6, 6–0, 3–6 |
| Loss | 6–5 | Nov 1996 | Ameritech Cup, United States | Tier II | Carpet (i) | (Czech Republic) Jana Novotná | 4–6, 6–3, 1–6 |
| Loss | 6–6 | Jan 1997 | Sydney International, Australia | Tier II | Hard | (Switzerland) Martina Hingis | 1–6, 7–5, 1–6 |
| Win | 7–6 | May 1999 | Internationaux de Strasbourg, France | Tier III | Clay | (Russia) Elena Likhovtseva | 6–1, 6–3 |
| Win | 8–6 | Nov 1999 | Tournoi de Québec, Canada | Tier III | Carpet (i) | (United States) Chanda Rubin | 4–6, 6–1, 6–2 |
| Win | 9–6 | Sep 2000 | Luxembourg Open, Luxembourg | Tier III | Carpet (i) | (Bulgaria) Magdalena Maleeva | 4–6, 6–1, 6–4 |
| Loss | 9–7 | Oct 2000 | Tournoi de Québec, Canada | Tier III | Carpet (i) | (United States) Chanda Rubin | 4–6, 2–6 |
| Win | 10–7 | Jan 2001 | Australian Open, Australia | Grand Slam | Hard | (Switzerland) Martina Hingis | 6–4, 6–3 |
| Loss | 10–8 | Feb 2001 | U.S. National Indoor Championships, United States | Tier III | Hard (i) | (United States) Monica Seles | 3–6, 7–5, 2–6 |
| Loss | 10–9 | Mar 2001 | Miami Open, United States | Tier I | Hard | (United States) Venus Williams | 6–4, 1–6, 6–7^{(4–7)} |
| Win | 11–9 | Apr 2001 | Charleston Open, United States | Tier I | Clay | (Switzerland) Martina Hingis | 6–0, 4–6, 6–4 |
| Loss | 11–10 | May 2001 | German Open, Germany | Tier I | Clay | (France) Amélie Mauresmo | 4–6, 6–2, 3–6 |
| Win | 12–10 | May 2001 | French Open, France | Grand Slam | Clay | (Belgium) Kim Clijsters | 1–6, 6–4, 12–10 |
| Loss | 12–11 | Aug 2001 | Canadian Open, Canada | Tier I | Hard | (United States) Serena Williams | 1–6, 7–6^{(9–7)}, 3–6 |
| Win | 13–11 | Jan 2002 | Australian Open, Australia | Grand Slam | Hard | (Switzerland) Martina Hingis | 4–6, 7–6^{(8–6)}, 6–2 |
| Loss | 13–12 | Feb 2002 | State Farm Classic, United States | Tier II | Hard | (United States) Serena Williams | 2–6, 6–4, 4–6 |
| Loss | 13–13 | Mar 2002 | Miami Open, United States | Tier I | Hard | (United States) Serena Williams | 5–7, 6–7^{(4–7)} |
| Loss | 13–14 | Aug 2002 | Canadian Open, Canada | Tier I | Hard | (France) Amélie Mauresmo | 4–6, 1–6 |
| Loss | 13–15 | Mar 2003 | Miami Open, United States | Tier I | Hard | (United States) Serena Williams | 6–4, 4–6, 1–6 |
| Loss | 13–16 | Jul 2003 | Silicon Valley Classic, United States | Tier II | Hard | (Belgium) Kim Clijsters | 6–4, 4–6, 2–6 |
| Win | 14–16 | Aug 2003 | Connecticut Open, United States | Tier II | Hard | (United States) Lindsay Davenport | 6–2, 4–0, retired |
| Loss | 14–17 | May 2004 | Italian Open, Italy | Tier I | Clay | (France) Amélie Mauresmo | 6–3, 3–6, 6–7^{(6–8)} |

=== Doubles: 2 (1 title, 1 runner-up) ===
| Legend WTA 1000 (Tier I) (1–0) WTA 500 (Tier II) (0–1) | Finals by Surface Grass (0–1) Clay (1–0) |

| Result | W–L | Date | Tournament | Tier | Surface | Partner | Opponents | Score |
|---|---|---|---|---|---|---|---|---|
| Win | 1–0 | May 1991 | Italian Open, Italy | Tier I | Clay | (Socialist Federal Republic of Yugoslavia) Monica Seles | (Australia) Nicole Bradtke (South Africa) Elna Reinach | 7–5, 6–2 |
| Loss | 1–1 | Jun 2003 | Eastbourne International, United Kingdom | Tier II | Grass | (Spain) Magüi Serna | (United States) Lindsay Davenport (United States) Lisa Raymond | 3–6, 2–6 |

== Billie Jean King Cup (Fed Cup) ==
=== Finals: (2–1) ===
| Result | Year | Location | Surface | Winners | Finalists | Score |
|---|---|---|---|---|---|---|
| Win | 1990 | Atlanta, United States | Hard | United States; Jennifer Capriati; Gigi Fernández; Zina Garrison | Soviet Union; Elena Brioukhovets; Larisa Savchenko; Natasha Zvereva | 3–0 |
| Loss | 1991 | Birmingham, United Kingdom | Hard | Spain; Conchita Martínez; Arantxa Sánchez Vicario | United States; Jennifer Capriati; Gigi Fernández; Mary Joe Fernández; Zina Garrison | 2–1 |
| Win | 2000 | Las Vegas, United States | Carpet | United States; Jennifer Capriati; Lindsay Davenport; Lisa Raymond; Monica Seles | Spain; Conchita Martínez; Virginia Ruano Pascual; Arantxa Sánchez Vicario; Magüi Serna | 5–0 |

== Junior finals ==
=== Grand Slams ===
==== Singles: 2 titles ====
| Result | Year | Chapmionship | Surface | Opponent | Score |
|---|---|---|---|---|---|
| Win | 1989 | French Open | Clay | (Czechoslovakia) Eva Sviglerová | 6–4, 6–0 |
| Win | 1989 | US Open | Hard | (Australia) Rachel McQuillan | 6–2, 6–3 |

==== Girls' doubles: 2 titles ====
| Result | Year | Chapmionship | Surface | Partner | Opponents | Result |
|---|---|---|---|---|---|---|
| Win | 1989 | Wimbledon | Grass | (United States) Meredith McGrath | (Czechoslovakia) Andrea Strnadová (Czechoslovakia) Eva Sviglerová | 6–4, 6–2 |
| Win | 1989 | US Open | Hard | (United States) Meredith McGrath | (Australia) Jo-Anne Faull (Australia) Rachel McQuillan | 6–0, 6–3 |

== WTA Tour career earnings ==
| Year | Grand Slam titles (Note: Includes singles, doubles and mixed doubles titles.) | WTA titles | Total titles | Earnings ($) | Money list rank |
| 1990 | 0 | 1 | 1 | 283,597 | 14 |
| 1991 | 0 | 2 | 2 | 535,617 | 9 |
| 1992 | 0 | 2 | 2 | 315,501 | 15 |
| 1993 | 0 | 1 | 1 | 357,108 | 17 |
| 1994–95 | DNP |
| 1996–97 | 0 | 0 | 0 | 196,806 | n/a |
| 1998 | 0 | 0 | 0 | 66,573 | 126 |
| 1999 | 0 | 2 | 2 | 243,937 | 36 |
| 2000 | 0 | 1 | 1 | 488,861 | 19 |
| 2001 | 2 | 1 | 3 | 2,268,624 | 2 |
| 2002 | 1 | 0 | 1 | 2,217,939 | 3 |
| 2003 | 0 | 1 | 1 | 1,942,015 | 4 |
| 2004 | 0 | 0 | 0 | 1,290,061 | 10 |
| Career | 3 | 11 | 14 | 10,206,639 | 86 |

== Career Grand Slam statistics ==
=== Grand Slam tournament seedings ===
| Year | Australian Open | French Open | Wimbledon | US Open |
|---|---|---|---|---|
| 1990 | did not play | not seeded | 12th | 13th |
| 1991 | did not play | 10th | 9th | 7th |
| 1992 | 5th | 5th | 6th | 6th |
| 1993 | 7th | 6th | 7th | 7th |
| 1996 | did not play | not seeded | did not play | not seeded |
| 1997 | not seeded | did not play | did not play | not seeded |
| 1998 | did not play | did not play | wildcard | wildcard |
| 1999 | not seeded | not seeded | not seeded | not seeded |
| 2000 | not seeded | 15th | not seeded | 15th |
| 2001 | 12th (1) | 4th (2) | 4th | 2nd |
| 2002 | 1st (3) | 1st | 3rd | 3rd |
| 2003 | 3rd | 7th | 7th | 6th |
| 2004 | did not play | 7th | 7th | 8th |

=== Best Grand Slam results details ===
Australian Open
2001 Australian Open
| Round | Opponent | Score |
| 1R | (Slovakia) Henrieta Nagyová | 4–6, 6–2, 7–5 |
| 2R | (Netherlands) Miriam Oremans | 6–0, 6–2 |
| 3R | (Spain) Virginia Ruano Pascual | 6–0, 6–2 |
| 4R | (Spain) Marta Marrero | 7–5, 6–1 |
| QF | (United States) Monica Seles (4) | 5–7, 6–4, 6–3 |
| SF | (United States) Lindsay Davenport (2) | 6–3, 6–4 |
| W | (Switzerland) Martina Hingis (1) | 6–4, 6–3 |
2002 Australian Open
| Round | Opponent | Score |
| 1R | (Croatia) Silvija Talaja | 6–4, 6–1 |
| 2R | (United States) Meilen Tu | 6–3, 6–1 |
| 3R | (Greece) Eleni Daniilidou | 6–2, 3–6, 6–1 |
| 4R | (Italy) Rita Grande (20) | 6–3, 7–6^{(11–9)} |
| QF | (France) Amélie Mauresmo (7) | 6–2, 6–2 |
| SF | (Belgium) Kim Clijsters (4) | 7–5, 3–6, 6–1 |
| W | (Switzerland) Martina Hingis (3) | 4–6, 7–6^{(9–7)}, 6–2 |
French Open
2001 French Open
| Round | Opponent | Score |
| 1R | (France) Émilie Loit | 6–2, 7–5 |
| 2R | (Italy) Tathiana Garbin | 6–2, 6–1 |
| 3R | (Croatia) Mirjana Lučić | 6–3, 6–1 |
| 4R | (United States) Meghann Shaughnessy (16) | 7–5, 6–1 |
| QF | (United States) Serena Williams (6) | 6–2, 5–7, 6–2 |
| SF | (Switzerland) Martina Hingis (1) | 6–4, 6–3 |
| W | (Belgium) Kim Clijsters (12) | 1–6, 6–4, 12–10 |
