= 1991 Mazda Classic =

1991 Women's tennis tournament in the USA

- Date: July 29 – August 5
- Edition: 13th
- Category: Tier III
- Draw: 28S / 16D
- Prize money: $225,000
- Surface: Hard / outdoor
- Location: San Diego, California, U.S.
- Venue: La Costa Resort and Spa

Champions

Singles
- (United States) Jennifer Capriati

Doubles
- (Canada) Jill Hetherington / (United States) Kathy Rinaldi
- Southern California Open

The 1991 Mazda Classic was a women's tennis tournament played on outdoor hard courts at the La Costa Resort and Spa in San Diego, California, in the United States that was part of Tier III of the 1991 WTA Tour. It was the 13th edition of the tournament and was held from July 29 through August 5, 1991. Fourth-seeded Jennifer Capriati won the singles title and earned $45,000 first-prize money.

It was the tournament's first year in La Costa after moving from the San Diego Tennis & Racquet Club. It was also Mazda's first year as sponsor after replacing Great American Bank, a San Diego–based institution that was in financial decline.

== Finals ==
=== Singles ===
(United States) Jennifer Capriati defeated (Socialist Federal Republic of Yugoslavia) Monica Seles, 4–6, 6–1, 7–6^{(7–2)}

- It was Capriati's 1st singles title of the year and the 2nd of her career.

=== Doubles ===
(Canada) Jill Hetherington / (United States) Kathy Rinaldi defeated (United States) Gigi Fernández / (France) Nathalie Tauziat, 6–4, 3–6, 6–2
