= 1992 Italian Open – Men's doubles =

Men's doubles
- 1992 Italian Open

Final
- Champions: (Switzerland) Jakob Hlasek (Switzerland) Marc Rosset
- Runners-up: (South Africa) Wayne Ferreira (Australia) Mark Kratzmann
- Score: 6–4, 3–6, 6–1

Details
- Draw: 32 (4WC/2Q)
- Seeds: 8

Events
Singles	men	women
Doubles	men	women
← 1991 ·	Italian Open	· 1993 →

Omar Camporese and Goran Ivanišević were the defending champions, but lost in the semifinals to Jakob Hlasek and Marc Rosset.

Hlasek and Rosset won the title by defeating Wayne Ferreira and Mark Kratzmann 6–4, 3–6, 6–1 in the final.

== Seeds ==
1. (Australia) Todd Woodbridge / (Australia) Mark Woodforde (first round)
2. (United States) Kelly Jones / (United States) Rick Leach (first round)
3. (Netherlands) Tom Nijssen / (Czechoslovakia) Cyril Suk (first round)
4. (United States) Luke Jensen / (Australia) Laurie Warder (second round)
5. (United States) Steve DeVries / (Australia) David Macpherson (first round)
6. (Spain) Sergio Casal / (Spain) Emilio Sánchez (first round)
7. (Italy) Omar Camporese / (Croatia) Goran Ivanišević (semifinals)
8. (South Africa) Wayne Ferreira / (Australia) Andrew Kratzmann (final)

== Draw ==
=== Key ===
- Q = Qualifier
- WC = Wild card
- LL = Lucky loser
- Alt = Alternate
- ITF = ITF entry
- PR = Protected ranking
- SR = Special ranking
- SE = Special exempt
- JE = Junior exempt
- JR = Junior Accelerator Programme entrant
- CO = College Accelerator Programme entrant
- NG = Next Gen Accelerator Program entrant
- w/o = Walkover
- r = Retired
- d = Defaulted

=== Finals ===
Semifinals
8	(South Africa) Wayne Ferreira (Australia) Andrew Kratzmann	6	7	6
(United States) Brad Pearce (South Africa) Byron Talbot	7	5	2
(Switzerland) Jakob Hlasek (Switzerland) Marc Rosset	6	7
7	(Italy) Omar Camporese (Croatia) Goran Ivanišević	2	5

Final
8	(South Africa) Wayne Ferreira (Australia) Andrew Kratzmann	4	6	1
(Switzerland) Jakob Hlasek (Switzerland) Marc Rosset	6	3	6

=== Top half ===
First round
1	(Australia) T Woodbridge (Australia) M Woodforde	4	6
(United States) S Cannon (United States) G Van Emburgh	6	7
(Italy) G Pozzi (Netherlands) M Schapers	1	1
(Spain) F Clavet (Spain) C Costa	6	6
(United States) P Galbraith (United States) S Melville	4	1^{r}
(Argentina) C Miniussi (Uruguay) D Pérez	6	2
(United States) M Briggs (United States) T Kronemann	2	6
8	(South Africa) W Ferreira (Australia) M Kratzmann	6	7
3	(Netherlands) T Nijssen (Czech Republic) C Suk	6	6
(Ecuador) A Gómez (Spain) J Sánchez	7	7
WC	(Italy) C Caratti (Italy) S Pescosolido	4	3
(United States) B Pearce (South Africa) B Talbot	6	6
(France) G Forget (United States) P McEnroe	5	6	7
WC	(Italy) M Cierro (Italy) R Furlan	7	4	6
WC	(United States) J Courier (United States) P Sampras	7	3	6
6	(Spain) S Casal (Spain) E Sánchez	6	6	3

Second round
(United States) S Cannon (United States) G Van Emburgh	7	6
(Spain) F Clavet (Spain) C Costa	6	3
(Argentina) C Miniussi (Uruguay) D Pérez	4	6	6
8	(South Africa) W Ferreira (Australia) M Kratzmann	6	4	7
(Ecuador) A Gómez (Spain) J Sánchez	2	7	5
(United States) B Pearce (South Africa) B Talbot	6	5	7
(France) G Forget (United States) P McEnroe	2	3
WC	(United States) J Courier (United States) P Sampras	6	6

Quarterfinals
(United States) S Cannon (United States) G Van Emburgh	5	6
8	(South Africa) W Ferreira (Australia) M Kratzmann	7	7
(United States) B Pearce (South Africa) B Talbot	6	6
WC	(United States) J Courier (United States) P Sampras	3	1

Semifinals
8	(South Africa) W Ferreira (Australia) M Kratzmann	6	7	6
(United States) B Pearce (South Africa) B Talbot	7	5	2

=== Bottom half ===
First round
5	(United States) S DeVries (Australia) D Macpherson	6	3
(Switzerland) J Hlasek (Switzerland) M Rosset	7	6
Q	(Italy) M Bertolini (Italy) M Navarra	3	2
(Netherlands) P Haarhuis (Netherlands) M Koevermans	6	6
(Italy) D Nargiso (Germany) U Riglewski	6	7
(Spain) T Carbonell (Czechoslovakia) L Pimek	1	5
(Czechoslovakia) I Lendl (Czechoslovakia) K Nováček	2	2
4	(United States) L Jensen (Australia) L Warder	6	6
7	(Italy) O Camporese (Croatia) G Ivanišević	7	6
(Mexico) J Lozano (Brazil) C Motta	6	3
WC	(Sweden) P Lundgren (Austria) T Muster	6	1	4
(Czechoslovakia) P Korda (United States) J Pugh	4	6	6
(South Africa) D Adams (Russia) A Olhovskiy	6	5	6
(Sweden) R Båthman (Sweden) R Bergh	3	7	4
Q	(Czechoslovakia) V Flégl (Argentina) H de la Peña	6	6	6
2	(United States) K Jones (United States) R Leach	4	7	3

Second round
(Switzerland) J Hlasek (Switzerland) M Rosset	6	6
(Netherlands) P Haarhuis (Netherlands) M Koevermans	1	4
(Italy) D Nargiso (Germany) U Riglewski	6	6
4	(United States) L Jensen (Australia) L Warder	2	2
7	(Italy) O Camporese (Croatia) G Ivanišević	7	6
(Czechoslovakia) P Korda (United States) J Pugh	6	4
(South Africa) D Adams (Russia) A Olhovskiy	7	6	6
Q	(Czechoslovakia) V Flégl (Argentina) H de la Peña	6	7	3

Quarterfinals
(Switzerland) J Hlasek (Switzerland) M Rosset	6	7	6
(Italy) D Nargiso (Germany) U Riglewski	7	6	4
7	(Italy) O Camporese (Croatia) G Ivanišević	6	6
(South Africa) D Adams (Russia) A Olhovskiy	3	3

Semifinals
(Switzerland) J Hlasek (Switzerland) M Rosset	6	7
7	(Italy) O Camporese (Croatia) G Ivanišević	2	5
