= Cavina =

Cavina may refer to:

- Cavina language, also known as Araona, a Pano–Tacanan language of Bolivia
- Cristina Cavina, Italian tennis player
- Gianni Cavina, Italian film actor
