= 1992 Italian Open – Women's singles =

Women's singles
- 1992 Italian Open

Final
- Champion: (Argentina) Gabriela Sabatini
- Runner-up: (Federal Republic of Yugoslavia) Monica Seles
- Score: 7–5, 6–4

Details
- Draw: 56 (3WC/8Q/3LL)
- Seeds: 16

Events
Singles	men	women
Doubles	men	women
← 1991 ·	Italian Open	· 1993 →

Defending champion Gabriela Sabatini defeated Monica Seles in a rematch of the previous year's final, 7–5, 6–4 to win the women's singles tennis title at the 1992 Italian Open.

== Seeds ==
The first eight seeds received a bye to the second round.

1. (Federal Republic of Yugoslavia) Monica Seles (final)
2. (Argentina) Gabriela Sabatini (champion)
3. (United States) Jennifer Capriati (third round)
4. (United States) Mary Joe Fernández (semifinals)
5. (Germany) Anke Huber (quarterfinals)
6. (Bulgaria) Katerina Maleeva (second round)
7. (France) Nathalie Tauziat (quarterfinals)
8. (France) Mary Pierce (second round)
9. (Czechoslovakia) Helena Suková (second round)
10. (Commonwealth of Independent States) Leila Meskhi (quarterfinals)
11. (Peru) Laura Gildemeister (first round)
12. (Czechoslovakia) Radka Zrubáková (third round)
13. (Netherlands) Brenda Schultz (second round)
14. (Commonwealth of Independent States) Natasha Zvereva (quarterfinals)
15. (Germany) Barbara Rittner (first round)
16. (South Africa) Amanda Coetzer (semifinals)

== Draw ==
=== Key ===
- Q = Qualifier
- WC = Wild card
- LL = Lucky loser
- Alt = Alternate
- ITF = ITF entry
- PR = Protected ranking
- SR = Special ranking
- SE = Special exempt
- JE = Junior exempt
- JR = Junior Accelerator Programme entrant
- CO = College Accelerator Programme entrant
- NG = Next Gen Accelerator Program entrant
- w/o = Walkover
- r = Retired
- d = Defaulted

=== Finals ===
Quarterfinals
1	(Federal Republic of Yugoslavia) Monica Seles	6	6
10	(Commonwealth of Independent States) Leila Meskhi	1	4
16	(South Africa) Amanda Coetzer	6	6
14	(Commonwealth of Independent States) Natasha Zvereva	2	3
5	(Germany) Anke Huber	6	6^{2}	3
4	(United States) Mary Joe Fernández	3	7^{7}	6
7	(France) Nathalie Tauziat	0	1
2	(Argentina) Gabriela Sabatini	6	6

Semifinals
1	(Federal Republic of Yugoslavia) Monica Seles	6	6
16	(South Africa) Amanda Coetzer	0	4
4	(United States) Mary Joe Fernández	2	3
2	(Argentina) Gabriela Sabatini	6	6

Final
1	(Federal Republic of Yugoslavia) Monica Seles	5	4
2	(Argentina) Gabriela Sabatini	7	6

=== Top half ===
==== Section 1 ====
First round
(Canada) P Hy	2	4
WC	(Italy) N Baudone	6	6
(France) S Testud	4	6	3
(United States) C Cunningham	6	2	6
(Italy) L Ferrando	6	6
11	(Peru) L Gildemeister	1	2
10	(Commonwealth of Independent States) L Meskhi	6	6
Q	(Italy) P Tampieri	1	3
(Japan) M Kidowaki	4	6	6
(United States) D Faber	6	1	3
(Argentina) B Fulco-Villella	6	6
Q	(France) P Etchemendy	3	3

Second round
1	(Federal Republic of Yugoslavia) M Seles	6	6
WC	(Italy) N Baudone	0	4
(United States) C Cunningham	6	6
(Italy) L Ferrando	4	1
10	(Commonwealth of Independent States) L Meskhi	6	6
(Japan) M Kidowaki	2	2
(Argentina) B Fulco-Villella	2	7^{8}	7
6	(Bulgaria) K Maleeva	6	6^{6}	5

Third round
1	(Federal Republic of Yugoslavia) M Seles	6	6
(United States) C Cunningham	0	1
10	(Commonwealth of Independent States) L Meskhi	6	6
(Argentina) B Fulco-Villella	1	2

Quarterfinals
1	(Federal Republic of Yugoslavia) M Seles	6	6
10	(Commonwealth of Independent States) L Meskhi	1	4

==== Section 2 ====
First round
Q	(United States) P O'Reilly	4	3
(Italy) S Cecchini	6	6
LL	(Slovenia) B Mulej	6	6
(Japan) A Kijimuta	3	0
(Italy) S Farina	1	4
16	(South Africa) A Coetzer	6	6
14	(Commonwealth of Independent States) N Zvereva	6	4	6
(United States) A Grossman	1	6	2
WC	(Italy) L Golarsa	2	7^{7}	7
Q	(Austria) S Dopfer	6	6^{5}	5
(Italy) R Reggi-Concato	6	6
(Argentina) F Labat	2	2

Second round
3	(United States) J Capriati	6	3	7^{7}
(Italy) S Cecchini	4	6	6^{4}
LL	(Slovenia) B Mulej	5	4
16	(South Africa) A Coetzer	7	6
14	(Commonwealth of Independent States) N Zvereva	6	6
WC	(Italy) L Golarsa	2	2
(Italy) R Reggi-Concato	7^{7}	5	6
8	(France) M Pierce	6^{4}	7	0

Third round
3	(United States) J Capriati	1	6	4
16	(South Africa) A Coetzer	6	3	6
14	(Commonwealth of Independent States) N Zvereva	6	6
(Italy) R Reggi-Concato	1	2

Quarterfinals
16	(South Africa) A Coetzer	6	6
14	(Commonwealth of Independent States) N Zvereva	2	3

=== Bottom half ===
==== Section 3 ====
First round
(Italy) K Piccolini	5	2
(United States) D Graham	7	6
Q	(Greece) C Papadáki	6	2	6
Q	(Italy) C Cavina	4	6	3
(Germany) M Kochta	2	2
12	(Czechoslovakia) R Zrubáková	6	6
13	(Netherlands) B Schultz	6	5	7^{8}
Q	(Italy) G Pizzichini	1	7	6^{6}
WC	(Italy) F Romanò	6^{4}	6	4
(Argentina) I Gorrochategui	7^{7}	1	6
(France) I Demongeot	6	6
(Germany) C Kohde-Kilsch	3	3

Second round
5	(Germany) A Huber	6	6
(United States) D Graham	4	4
Q	(Greece) C Papadáki	1	4
12	(Czechoslovakia) R Zrubáková	6	6
13	(Netherlands) B Schultz	5	6	2
(Argentina) I Gorrochategui	7	3	6
(France) I Demongeot	3	4
4	(United States) MJ Fernández	6	6

Third round
5	(Germany) A Huber	6	4	6
12	(Czechoslovakia) R Zrubáková	1	6	1
(Argentina) I Gorrochategui	6	2	2
4	(United States) MJ Fernández	3	6	6

Quarterfinals
5	(Germany) A Huber	6	6^{2}	3
4	(United States) MJ Fernández	3	7^{7}	6

==== Section 4 ====
First round
(Italy) L Garrone	6	6
Q	(Austria) H Sprung	2	4
(Italy) F Bonsignori	7	3	4
(Australia) R McQuillan	5	6	6
(Czechoslovakia) R Rajchrtová	3	5
9	(Czechoslovakia) H Suková	6	7
15	(West Germany) B Rittner	2	2
LL	(Italy) F Perfetti	6	6
(Australia) N Provis	6	6
(Poland) K Nowak	1	1
LL	(Spain) A Segura	0	0
(Argentina) M Paz	6	6

Second round
7	(France) N Tauziat	6	6
(Italy) L Garrone	2	0
(Australia) R McQuillan	7	6
9	(Czechoslovakia) H Suková	5	4
LL	(Italy) F Perfetti	2	6^{3}
(Australia) N Provis	6	7^{7}
(Argentina) M Paz	3	1
2	(Argentina) G Sabatini	6	6

Third round
7	(France) N Tauziat	6	6
(Australia) R McQuillan	2	0
(Australia) N Provis	1	2
2	(Argentina) G Sabatini	6	6

Quarterfinals
7	(France) N Tauziat	0	1
2	(Argentina) G Sabatini	6	6
