= 1991 Mazda Classic – Doubles =

Doubles
- 1991 Mazda Classic

Final
- Champions: (Canada) Jill Hetherington (United States) Kathy Rinaldi
- Runners-up: (United States) Gigi Fernández (France) Nathalie Tauziat
- Score: 6–4, 3–6, 6–2

Details
- Draw: 16 (1Q)
- Seeds: 4

Events
Singles	Doubles
- San Diego Open

Patty Fendick and Zina Garrison were the defending champions, but Fendick did not compete this year. Garrison teamed up with Jennifer Capriati and lost in the quarterfinals to Isabelle Demongeot and Conchita Martínez.

Jill Hetherington and Kathy Rinaldi won the title by defeating Gigi Fernández and Nathalie Tauziat 6–4, 3–6, 6–2 in the final.

== Seeds ==
1. (United States) Gigi Fernández / (France) Nathalie Tauziat (final)
2. (United States) Jennifer Capriati / (United States) Zina Garrison (quarterfinals)
3. (Canada) Jill Hetherington / (United States) Kathy Rinaldi (champions)
4. (South Africa) Rosalyn Fairbank-Nideffer / (South Africa) Lise Gregory (semifinals)

== Draw ==
Key

- Q = Qualifier
- WC = Wild card
- LL = Lucky loser
- Alt = Alternate
- ITF = ITF entry
- PR = Protected ranking
- SR = Special ranking
- SE = Special exempt
- JE = Junior exempt
- JR = Junior Accelerator Programme entrant
- CO = College Accelerator Programme entrant
- NG = Next Gen Accelerator Program entrant
- w/o = Walkover
- r = Retired
- d = Defaulted

=== Draw ===
First round
1	(United States) G Fernández (France) N Tauziat	6	6
(Greece) C Papadáki (United States) Sylvia Schenck	0	1
(United States) E deLone (United Kingdom) S Loosemore	6	2	6
(United States) C Kuhlman (United States) Ca MacGregor	3	6	3
4	(South Africa) R Fairbank-Nideffer (South Africa) L Gregory	6	6^{1}	7^{9}
(United Kingdom) J Durie (France) N Herreman	1	7^{7}	6^{7}
(United States) P Louie Harper (United States) A May	7	7
(United States) H Cioffi (South Africa) Lisa Seemann	5	5
(Australia) A Minter (United States) M Werdel	7^{7}	3	2
(Peru) L Gildemeister (Switzerland) M Maleeva-Fragnière	6^{2}	6	6
Q	(United States) L Davenport (United States) A Mall	6	2	3
3	(Canada) J Hetherington (United States) K Rinaldi	1	6	6
(France) I Demongeot (Spain) C Martínez	6	7^{7}
(United States) J Emmons (United States) D Graham	4	6^{2}
(Japan) A Kijimuta (Japan) N Sawamatsu	6	5	2
2	(United States) J Capriati (United States) Z Garrison	4	7	6

Quarterfinals
1	(United States) G Fernández (France) N Tauziat	6	6
(United States) E deLone (United Kingdom) S Loosemore	0	1
4	(South Africa) R Fairbank-Nideffer (South Africa) L Gregory	7^{7}	6
(United States) P Louie Harper (United States) A May	6^{3}	4
(Peru) L Gildemeister (Switzerland) M Maleeva-Fragnière	1	6	2
3	(Canada) J Hetherington (United States) K Rinaldi	6	4	6
(France) I Demongeot (Spain) C Martínez	6	7^{7}
2	(United States) J Capriati (United States) Z Garrison	4	6^{5}

Semifinals
1	(United States) G Fernández (France) N Tauziat	6	1	7
4	(South Africa) R Fairbank-Nideffer (South Africa) L Gregory	3	6	5
3	(Canada) J Hetherington (United States) K Rinaldi	w/o
(France) I Demongeot (Spain) C Martínez

Final
1	(United States) G Fernández (France) N Tauziat	4	6	2
3	(Canada) J Hetherington (United States) K Rinaldi	6	3	6
