= 1992 Italian Open – Men's singles =

Men's singles
- 1992 Italian Open

Final
- Champion: (United States) Jim Courier
- Runner-up: (Spain) Carlos Costa
- Score: 7–6^{(7–3)}, 6–0, 6–4

Details
- Draw: 64
- Seeds: 16

Events
Singles	men	women
Doubles	men	women
← 1991 ·	Italian Open	· 1993 →

Jim Courier defeated Carlos Costa in the final, 7–6^{(7–3)}, 6–0, 6–4 to win the men's singles tennis title at the 1992 Italian Open.

Emilio Sánchez was the defending champion, but lost in the third round to Michael Chang.

== Seeds ==
1. (United States) Jim Courier (champion)
2. (United States) Pete Sampras (quarterfinals)
3. (Germany) ~~Boris Becker~~ (withdrew)
4. (Germany) Michael Stich (first round)
5. (United States) Michael Chang (quarterfinals)
6. (France) Guy Forget (first round)
7. (Croatia) Goran Ivanišević (first round)
8. (Czechoslovakia) Petr Korda (semifinals)
9. (Czechoslovakia) Ivan Lendl (second round)
10. (Argentina) Alberto Mancini (third round)
11. (Spain) Emilio Sánchez (third round)
12. (Czechoslovakia) Karel Nováček (first round)
13. (United States) Aaron Krickstein (first round)
14. (Netherlands) Richard Krajicek (first round)
15. (Spain) Sergi Bruguera (third round)
16. (Commonwealth of Independent States) Alexander Volkov (first round)

== Draw ==
=== Key ===
- Q = Qualifier
- WC = Wild card
- LL = Lucky loser
- Alt = Alternate
- ITF = ITF entry
- PR = Protected ranking
- SR = Special ranking
- SE = Special exempt
- JE = Junior exempt
- JR = Junior Accelerator Programme entrant
- CO = College Accelerator Programme entrant
- NG = Next Gen Accelerator Program entrant
- w/o = Walkover
- r = Retired
- d = Defaulted
- NB: The Final was the best of 5 sets.

=== Finals ===
Semifinals
1	(United States) Jim Courier	5	6	6
(Germany) Carl-Uwe Steeb	7	1	2
(Spain) Carlos Costa	6	6
8	(Czechoslovakia) Petr Korda	4	3

Final
1	(United States) Jim Courier	7^{7}	6	6
(Spain) Carlos Costa	6^{3}	0	4

=== Top half ===
==== Section 1 ====
First round
1	(United States) J Courier	7^{7}	6
(Austria) T Muster	6^{1}	4
(Spain) F Clavet	6	6
(Netherlands) M Schapers	2	2
Q	(Spain) Á Corretja	6	6
(France) F Fontang	3	4
Q	(Sweden) J Svensson	4	3
15	(Spain) S Bruguera	6	6
9	(Czechoslovakia) I Lendl	6	6
(Spain) J Arrese	1	4
(Switzerland) M Rosset	6	7
Q	(Sweden) L Jonsson	3	5
(United States) J Tarango	5	4
(Netherlands) P Haarhuis	7	6
(Argentina) C Miniussi	7	6
7	(Croatia) G Ivanišević	5	3

Second round
1	(United States) J Courier	6	6
(Spain) F Clavet	2	2
Q	(Spain) Á Corretja	6^{5}	4
15	(Spain) S Bruguera	7^{7}	6
9	(Czechoslovakia) I Lendl	4	6	6^{3}
(Switzerland) M Rosset	6	2	7^{7}
(Netherlands) P Haarhuis	4	5
(Argentina) C Miniussi	6	7

Third round
1	(United States) J Courier	6	6
15	(Spain) S Bruguera	3	2
(Switzerland) M Rosset	3	7	5
(Argentina) C Miniussi	6	5	7

Quarterfinals
1	(United States) J Courier	4	6	6
(Argentina) C Miniussi	6	4	1

==== Section 2 ====
First round
Q	(Netherlands) M Koevermans	6	4	6
WC	(Italy) D Nargiso	0	6	2
(Spain) G López	3	2
WC	(Italy) C Pistolesi	6	6
(Argentina) M Jaite	5	5
WC	(United States) P McEnroe	7	7
(Germany) C-U Steeb	6	5	6
14	(Netherlands) R Krajicek	4	7	2
11	(Spain) E Sánchez	6	2	6
(Sweden) C Bergström	4	6	3
(South Africa) C van Rensburg	6	4	6^{4}
(Switzerland) J Hlasek	1	6	7^{7}
(France) T Champion	5	1
(Italy) R Furlan	7	6
Q	(Argentina) G Markus	3	6	3
5	(United States) M Chang	6	2	6

Second round
Q	(Netherlands) M Koevermans	5	6	4
WC	(Italy) C Pistolesi	7	4	6
WC	(United States) P McEnroe	2	4
(Germany) C-U Steeb	6	6
11	(Spain) E Sánchez	6	7^{8}
(Switzerland) J Hlasek	4	6^{6}
(Italy) R Furlan	1	6	3
5	(United States) M Chang	6	3	6

Third round
WC	(Italy) C Pistolesi	1	2
(Germany) C-U Steeb	6	6
11	(Spain) E Sánchez	1	5
5	(United States) M Chang	6	7

Quarterfinals
(Germany) C-U Steeb	6	3	6
5	(United States) M Chang	4	6	1

=== Bottom half ===
==== Section 3 ====
First round
6	(France) G Forget	5	6	4
(Spain) J Sánchez	7	4	6
Q	(Germany) M Zillner	4	6	5
(Italy) O Camporese	6	4	7
(Peru) J Yzaga	7^{7}	7^{7}
LL	(Haiti) R Agénor	6^{1}	6^{3}
Q	(Spain) T Carbonell	4	6	6
12	(Czechoslovakia) K Nováček	6	4	3
13	(United States) A Krickstein	4	4
(Spain) C Costa	6	6
(South Africa) W Ferreira	6	6^{4}	7^{7}
Q	(Sweden) N Kulti	4	7^{7}	6^{3}
(France) A Boetsch	4	3
(Israel) A Mansdorf	6	6
(France) F Santoro	5	2
4	(Germany) M Stich	7	1^{r}

Second round
(Spain) J Sánchez	3	7	6
(Italy) O Camporese	6	5	3
(Peru) J Yzaga	6	6
Q	(Spain) T Carbonell	4	0
(Spain) C Costa	6	7
(South Africa) W Ferreira	3	5
(Israel) A Mansdorf	1	0
(France) F Santoro	6	6

Third round
(Spain) J Sánchez	3	6	6^{2}
(Peru) J Yzaga	6	3	7^{7}
(Spain) C Costa	6	7
(France) F Santoro	2	5

Quarterfinals
(Peru) J Yzaga	4	0
(Spain) C Costa	6	6

==== Section 4 ====
First round
8	(Czechoslovakia) P Korda	6	6
(Italy) G Pozzi	4	3
(Commonwealth of Independent States) A Cherkasov	7^{10}	6
(Ecuador) A Gómez	6^{8}	2
WC	(Italy) C Caratti	2	1
(Argentina) G Pérez Roldán	6	6
(Netherlands) J Siemerink	3	6	3
10	(Argentina) A Mancini	6	3	6
16	(Commonwealth of Independent States) A Volkov	2	6	5
(Croatia) G Prpić	6	4	7
(Italy) S Pescosolido	6	1
(Sweden) M Larsson	3	2^{r}
(France) C Pioline	4	3
(Austria) H Skoff	6	6
WC	(Italy) P Canè	4	4
2	(United States) P Sampras	6	6

Second round
8	(Czechoslovakia) P Korda	6	5	6
(Commonwealth of Independent States) A Cherkasov	3	7	4
(Argentina) G Pérez Roldán	6^{3}	6^{5}
10	(Argentina) A Mancini	7^{7}	7^{7}
(Croatia) G Prpić	6	7^{7}
(Italy) S Pescosolido	1	6^{4}
(Austria) H Skoff	3	4
2	(United States) P Sampras	6	6

Third round
8	(Czechoslovakia) P Korda	3	7^{7}	6
10	(Argentina) A Mancini	6	6^{4}	3
(Croatia) G Prpić	2	7^{7}	3
2	(United States) P Sampras	6	6^{5}	6

Quarterfinals
8	(Czechoslovakia) P Korda	1	7^{7}	6
2	(United States) P Sampras	6	6^{4}	3
