= 1991 Canadian Open – Men's doubles =

Men's doubles
- 1991 Canadian Open

Final
- Champions: (United States) Patrick Galbraith (United States) Todd Witsken
- Runners-up: (Canada) Grant Connell (Canada) Glenn Michibata
- Score: 6–4, 3–6, 6–1

Details
- Draw: 28 (2Q)
- Seeds: 8

Events
Singles	men	women
Doubles	men	women
- Canadian Open

Paul Annacone and David Wheaton were the defending champions, but Wheaton chose not to participate. Annacone partnered with Doug Flach, but lost to Jim Grabb and Richey Reneberg in the first round.

Patrick Galbraith and Todd Witsken won the title, defeating Grant Connell and Glenn Michibata in the finals, 6–4, 3–6, 6–1.

== Seeds ==
The top four seeded teams received byes into the second round.

1. (United States) Scott Davis / (United States) David Pate (quarterfinals)
2. (Canada) Grant Connell / (Canada) Glenn Michibata (finals)
3. (United States) Patrick Galbraith / (United States) Todd Witsken (champions)
4. (United States) Luke Jensen / (Australia) Laurie Warder (quarterfinals)
5. (United States) Jim Courier / (Switzerland) Jakob Hlasek (quarterfinals)
6. (Australia) Wally Masur / (Australia) Mark Woodforde (semifinals)
7. (Australia) Broderick Dyke / (Sweden) Peter Lundgren (first round)
8. (United States) Ken Flach / (United States) Robert Seguso (semifinals)

== Draw ==
Key

- Q = Qualifier
- WC = Wild card
- LL = Lucky loser
- Alt = Alternate
- ITF = ITF entry
- PR = Protected ranking
- SR = Special ranking
- SE = Special exempt
- JE = Junior exempt
- JR = Junior Accelerator Programme entrant
- CO = College Accelerator Programme entrant
- NG = Next Gen Accelerator Program entrant
- w/o = Walkover
- r = Retired
- d = Defaulted

=== Finals ===
Semifinals
8	(United States) Ken Flach (United States) Robert Seguso	4	4
3	(United States) Patrick Galbraith (United States) Todd Witsken	6	6
6	(Australia) Wally Masur (Australia) Mark Woodforde	3	6	3
2	(Canada) Grant Connell (Canada) Glenn Michibata	6	3	6

Final
3	(United States) Patrick Galbraith (United States) Todd Witsken	6	3	6
2	(Canada) Grant Connell (Canada) Glenn Michibata	4	6	1

=== Top half ===
First round
(Israel) G Bloom (Czechoslovakia) P Korda	7	6
Q	(Germany) A Mronz (United States) M Washington	5	4
(United States) J Grabb (United States) R Reneberg	7	5	6
(United States) P Annacone (United States) D Flach	6	7	3
(United States) S DeVries (Australia) D Macpherson	6	4
8	(United States) K Flach (United States) R Seguso	7	6
(United States) J Arias (United States) K Thorne	7	6
Q	(United States) G Failla (United States) T Mercer	5	1
(Canada) D Nestor (United Kingdom) G Rusedski	4	4
(United States) P McEnroe (United States) P Sampras	6	6
(Sweden) H Holm (United States) J Kriek	6	4
5	(United States) J Courier (Switzerland) J Hlasek	7	6

Second round
1	(United States) S Davis (United States) D Pate	6	6
(Israel) G Bloom (Czechoslovakia) P Korda	3	4
(United States) J Grabb (United States) R Reneberg	6	3	2
8	(United States) K Flach (United States) R Seguso	4	6	6
3	(United States) P Galbraith (United States) T Witsken	7	6
(United States) J Arias (United States) K Thorne	6	3
(United States) P McEnroe (United States) P Sampras	6	4
5	(United States) J Courier (Switzerland) J Hlasek	7	6

Quarterfinals
1	(United States) S Davis (United States) D Pate	6	3	4
8	(United States) K Flach (United States) R Seguso	3	6	6
3	(United States) P Galbraith (United States) T Witsken	6	6	6
5	(United States) J Courier (Switzerland) J Hlasek	4	7	4

Semifinals
8	(United States) K Flach (United States) R Seguso	4	4
3	(United States) P Galbraith (United States) T Witsken	6	6

=== Bottom half ===
First round
6	(Australia) W Masur (Australia) M Woodforde	6	6
(Australia) N Borwick (Australia) S Youl	1	4
(Italy) G Pozzi (United States) D Rostagno	4	4
(Sweden) T Svantesson (United States) G Van Emburgh	6	6
(United States) J Brown (United States) B Garnett	6	5
(United States) S Cannon (The Bahamas) R Smith	7	7
7	(Australia) B Dyke (Sweden) P Lundgren	4	1
(Italy) U Colombini (Italy) S Pescosolido	6	6
(Canada) S Lareau (Canada) S Leblanc	6	1	6
(United States) B Gilbert (United States) I Lendl	4	6	2
(United States) K Kinnear (United States) B Pearce	6	7	6
(United States) C Beckman (United States) S Salumaa	7	6	1

Second round
6	(Australia) W Masur (Australia) M Woodforde	7	3	7
(Sweden) T Svantesson (United States) G Van Emburgh	6	6	5
(United States) S Cannon (The Bahamas) R Smith	7	4	4
4	(United States) L Jensen (Australia) L Warder	6	6	6
(Italy) U Colombini (Italy) S Pescosolido	5	7	3
(Canada) S Lareau (Canada) S Leblanc	7	6	6
(United States) K Kinnear (United States) B Pearce	6	4
2	(Canada) G Connell (Canada) G Michibata	7	6

Quarterfinals
6	(Australia) W Masur (Australia) M Woodforde	6	6	6
4	(United States) L Jensen (Australia) L Warder	7	4	4
(Canada) S Lareau (Canada) S Leblanc	3	6
2	(Canada) G Connell (Canada) G Michibata	6	7

Semifinals
6	(Australia) W Masur (Australia) M Woodforde	3	6	3
2	(Canada) G Connell (Canada) G Michibata	6	3	6
