= 1991 Mazda Classic – Singles =

Singles
- 1991 Mazda Classic

Final
- Champion: (United States) Jennifer Capriati
- Runner-up: (Socialist Federal Republic of Yugoslavia) Monica Seles
- Score: 4–6, 6–1, 7–6^{(7–2)}

Details
- Draw: 28 (4Q/1LL)
- Seeds: 8

Events
| Singles | Doubles |
- San Diego Open

Steffi Graf was the defending champion, but did not compete this year.

Jennifer Capriati won the title by defeating Monica Seles 4–6, 6–1, 7–6^{(7–2)} in the final.

== Seeds ==
The first four seeds received a bye into the second round.

1. (Socialist Federal Republic of Yugoslavia) Monica Seles (final)
2. (Spain) Conchita Martínez (semifinals)
3. (Switzerland) Manuela Maleeva-Fragnière (quarterfinals)
4. (United States) Jennifer Capriati (champion)
5. (United States) Zina Garrison (quarterfinals)
6. (France) Nathalie Tauziat (semifinals)
7. (Austria) Barbara Paulus (second round)
8. (Peru) Laura Gildemeister (first round)

== Draw ==
Key

- Q = Qualifier
- WC = Wild card
- LL = Lucky loser
- Alt = Alternate
- ITF = ITF entry
- PR = Protected ranking
- SR = Special ranking
- SE = Special exempt
- JE = Junior exempt
- JR = Junior Accelerator Programme entrant
- CO = College Accelerator Programme entrant
- NG = Next Gen Accelerator Program entrant
- w/o = Walkover
- r = Retired
- d = Defaulted

=== Finals ===
Semifinals
1 | (Socialist Federal Republic of Yugoslavia) Monica Seles | 6 | 6
6 | (France) Nathalie Tauziat | 1 | 2
4 | (United States) Jennifer Capriati | 6 | 6
2 | (Spain) Conchita Martínez | 4 | 0

Final
1 | (Socialist Federal Republic of Yugoslavia) Monica Seles | 6 | 1 | 6^{2}
4 | (United States) Jennifer Capriati | 4 | 6 | 7^{7}

=== Top half ===
First round
(United States) P Shriver | 6 | 6
(United Kingdom) J Durie | 3 | 4
(Japan) A Kijimuta | 6 | 1 | 6
Q | (United States) J Emmons | 4 | 6 | 4
(Australia) A Minter | 6 | 6
8 | (Peru) L Gildemeister | 3 | 4
(United States) P Louie Harper | 3 | 3
Q | (United States) K Po | 6 | 6
LL | (France) N Herreman | 3 | 1
(United States) A May | 6 | 6
(United States) K Rinaldi | 3 | 6 | 4
6 | (France) N Tauziat | 6 | 4 | 6

Second round
1 | (Socialist Federal Republic of Yugoslavia) M Seles | 6 | 6
(United States) P Shriver | 2 | 2
(Japan) A Kijimuta | 3 | 7 | 5
(Australia) A Minter | 6 | 5 | 7
3 | (Switzerland) M Maleeva-Fragnière | 6^{4} | 6 | 6
Q | (United States) K Po | 7^{7} | 3 | 2
(United States) A May | 3 | 4
6 | (France) N Tauziat | 6 | 6

Quarterfinals
1 | (Socialist Federal Republic of Yugoslavia) M Seles | 6 | 6
(Australia) A Minter | 0 | 3
3 | (Switzerland) M Maleeva-Fragnière | 3 | 3
6 | (France) N Tauziat | 6 | 6

Semifinals
1 | (Socialist Federal Republic of Yugoslavia) M Seles | 6 | 6
6 | (France) N Tauziat | 1 | 2

=== Bottom half ===
First round
5 | (United States) Z Garrison | 6 | 6
(South Africa) R Fairbank-Nideffer | 3 | 4
(France) K Quentrec | 6 | 5 | 6
(Germany) C Kohde-Kilsch | 4 | 7 | 4
(Japan) N Sawamatsu | 6 | 1 | 1
(United States) L McNeil | 3 | 6 | 6
7 | (Austria) B Paulus | 6 | 6
(Greece) C Papadáki | 2 | 3
Q | (United States) E deLone | 1 | 0
Q | (United States) D Graham | 6 | 6
(United States) H Cioffi | 6 | 1 | 1
(United States) M Werdel | 0 | 6 | 6

Second round
5 | (United States) Z Garrison | 6 | 6
(France) K Quentrec | 2 | 1
(United States) L McNeil | 2 | 1
4 | (United States) J Capriati | 6 | 6
7 | (Austria) B Paulus | 3 | 4
Q | (United States) D Graham | 6 | 6
(United States) M Werdel | 3 | 1
2 | (Spain) C Martínez | 6 | 6

Quarterfinals
5 | (United States) Z Garrison | 1 | 4
4 | (United States) J Capriati | 6 | 6
Q | (United States) D Graham | 0 | 5
2 | (Spain) C Martínez | 6 | 7

Semifinals
4 | (United States) J Capriati | 6 | 6
2 | (Spain) C Martínez | 4 | 0
