= 1991 Italian Open – Men's singles =

Men's singles
- 1991 Italian Open

Final
- Champion: (Spain) Emilio Sánchez
- Runner-up: (Argentina) Alberto Mancini
- Score: 6–3, 6–1, 3–0 ret.

Details
- Draw: 64
- Seeds: 16

Events
| Singles | men | women |
| Doubles | men | women |
| ← 1990 · | Italian Open | · 1992 → |

Emilio Sánchez won the men's singles tennis title at the 1991 Italian Open after Alberto Mancini retired from the final, with the scoreline at 6–3, 6–1, 3–0.

Thomas Muster was the defending champion, but lost to Goran Prpić in the third round.

== Seeds ==
1. (Germany) ~~Boris Becker~~ (withdrew)
2. (United States) Andre Agassi (first round)
3. (United States) Pete Sampras (second round)
4. (Socialist Federal Republic of Yugoslavia) Goran Ivanišević (first round)
5. (Spain) Sergi Bruguera (semifinals)
6. (United States) Jim Courier (third round)
7. (Sweden) Jonas Svensson (second round)
8. (United States) Brad Gilbert (first round)
9. (Spain) Emilio Sánchez (champion)
10. (Germany) Michael Stich (first round)
11. (Soviet Union) Andrei Cherkasov (quarterfinals)
12. (Argentina) Guillermo Pérez Roldán (first round)
13. (Switzerland) Jakob Hlasek (second round)
14. (Sweden) Magnus Gustafsson (second round)
15. (Soviet Union) Alexander Volkov (second round)
16. (Czechoslovakia) Karel Nováček (first round)

== Draw ==
=== Key ===
- Q = Qualifier
- WC = Wild card
- LL = Lucky loser
- Alt = Alternate
- ITF = ITF entry
- PR = Protected ranking
- SR = Special ranking
- SE = Special exempt
- JE = Junior exempt
- JR = Junior Accelerator Programme entrant
- CO = College Accelerator Programme entrant
- NG = Next Gen Accelerator Program entrant
- w/o = Walkover
- r = Retired
- d = Defaulted

=== Finals ===
Quarterfinals
(Australia) Richard Fromberg | 2 | 2
9 | (Spain) Emilio Sánchez | 6 | 6
(Socialist Federal Republic of Yugoslavia) Goran Prpić | 7^{7} | 7
11 | (Soviet Union) Andrei Cherkasov | 6^{3} | 5
5 | (Spain) Sergi Bruguera | 6 | 7^{7}
(France) Fabrice Santoro | 4 | 6^{1}
Q | (Argentina) Alberto Mancini | 6 | 6
(Argentina) Horacio de la Peña | 4 | 2

Semifinals
9 | (Spain) Emilio Sánchez | 6 | 6
(Socialist Federal Republic of Yugoslavia) Goran Prpić | 4 | 2
5 | (Spain) Sergi Bruguera | 3 | 1
Q | (Argentina) Alberto Mancini | 6 | 6

Final
9 | (Spain) Emilio Sánchez | 6 | 6 | 3
Q | (Argentina) Alberto Mancini | 3 | 1 | 0^{r}

=== Section 1 ===
First round
LL | (France) C Pioline | 7 | 6
(Switzerland) M Rosset | 5 | 3
(Argentina) M Jaite | 6 | 5 | 6^{4}
(Italy) C Caratti | 4 | 7 | 7^{7}
(Australia) R Fromberg | 4 | 7^{7} | 6
(United States) P McEnroe | 6 | 6^{5} | 2
(Netherlands) J Siemerink | 7^{7} | 3 | 2
15 | (Soviet Union) A Volkov | 6^{3} | 6 | 6
9 | (Spain) E Sánchez | 6 | 6
(Australia) T Woodbridge | 1 | 1
(Austria) H Skoff | 6 | 6
(Brazil) L Mattar | 1 | 1
Q | (South Africa) W Ferreira | 6 | 2 | 6
(Spain) T Carbonell | 4 | 6 | 4
(Australia) M Woodforde | 3 | 6 | 6
8 | (United States) B Gilbert | 6 | 2 | 4

Second round
LL | (France) C Pioline | 4 | 5
(Italy) C Caratti | 6 | 7
(Australia) R Fromberg | 7 | 6
15 | (Soviet Union) A Volkov | 5 | 3
9 | (Spain) E Sánchez | 6 | 6
(Austria) H Skoff | 4 | 3
Q | (South Africa) W Ferreira | 7^{7} | 6
(Australia) M Woodforde | 6^{2} | 4

Third round
(Italy) C Caratti | 5 | 0
(Australia) R Fromberg | 7 | 6
9 | (Spain) E Sánchez | 6 | 6
Q | (South Africa) W Ferreira | 2 | 2

Quarterfinals
(Australia) R Fromberg | 2 | 2
9 | (Spain) E Sánchez | 6 | 6

=== Section 2 ===
First round
4 | (Socialist Federal Republic of Yugoslavia) G Ivanišević | 6 | 5 | 3
(Netherlands) P Haarhuis | 3 | 7 | 6
(Austria) T Muster | 6 | 6
(Israel) A Mansdorf | 4 | 2
(Uruguay) M Filippini | 0 | 6 | 1
(Socialist Federal Republic of Yugoslavia) G Prpić | 6 | 2 | 6
WC | (Italy) P Canè | 6 | 2 | 4
13 | (Switzerland) J Hlasek | 3 | 6 | 6
11 | (Soviet Union) A Cherkasov | 6 | 6
(Austria) A Antonitsch | 2 | 4
WC | (Italy) S Pescosolido | 6 | 6
Q | (Netherlands) R Krajicek | 1 | 2
(Italy) O Camporese | 5 | 6 | 4
(Sweden) N Kulti | 7 | 4 | 6
(Spain) J Arrese | 4 | 6 | 3
6 | (United States) J Courier | 6 | 4 | 6

Second round
(Netherlands) P Haarhuis | 4 | 2
(Austria) T Muster | 6 | 6
(Socialist Federal Republic of Yugoslavia) G Prpić | 6 | 7
13 | (Switzerland) J Hlasek | 1 | 5
11 | (Soviet Union) A Cherkasov | 6^{3} | 6 | 7^{7}
WC | (Italy) S Pescosolido | 7^{7} | 2 | 6^{4}
(Sweden) N Kulti | 0 | 3
6 | (United States) J Courier | 6 | 6

Third round
(Austria) T Muster | 6 | 3 | 2
(Socialist Federal Republic of Yugoslavia) G Prpić | 3 | 6 | 6
11 | (Soviet Union) A Cherkasov | 4 | 6 | 6
6 | (United States) J Courier | 6 | 1 | 2

Quarterfinals
(Socialist Federal Republic of Yugoslavia) G Prpić | 7^{7} | 7
11 | (Soviet Union) A Cherkasov | 6^{3} | 5

=== Section 3 ===
First round
5 | (Spain) S Bruguera | 3 | 6 | 7^{7}
Q | (Spain) C Costa | 6 | 2 | 6^{5}
WC | (France) Y Noah | 6 | 6
(Germany) A Mronz | 1 | 3
WC | (Italy) C Pistolesi | 6 | 6^{5} | 6^{4}
(United States) A Krickstein | 4 | 7^{7} | 7^{7}
Q | (Argentina) C Miniussi | 6^{6} | 6 | 6
12 | (Argentina) G Pérez Roldán | 7^{8} | 4 | 1
14 | (Sweden) M Gustafsson | 7^{8} | 6
(Sweden) M Wilander | 6^{6} | 1
(France) H Leconte | 6 | 4 | 6
Q | (France) F Fontang | 2 | 6 | 2
(France) F Santoro | 6 | 6
(Sweden) M Larsson | 4 | 1
Q | (Georgia (country)) V Gabrichidze | 6^{2} | 6 | 2
3 | (United States) P Sampras | 7^{7} | 4 | 6

Second round
5 | (Spain) S Bruguera | 6 | 6
WC | (France) Y Noah | 1 | 3
(United States) A Krickstein | 2 | 4
Q | (Argentina) C Miniussi | 6 | 6
14 | (Sweden) M Gustafsson | 0 | 3
(France) H Leconte | 6 | 6
(France) F Santoro | 6 | 4 | 7
3 | (United States) P Sampras | 2 | 6 | 5

Third round
5 | (Spain) S Bruguera | 6 | 6
Q | (Argentina) C Miniussi | 1 | 2
(France) H Leconte | 4 | 7 | 6^{5}
(France) F Santoro | 6 | 5 | 7^{7}

Quarterfinals
5 | (Spain) S Bruguera | 6 | 7^{7}
(France) F Santoro | 4 | 6^{1}

=== Section 4 ===
First round
7 | (Sweden) J Svensson | 6 | 3 | 6
(Argentina) F Davín | 4 | 6 | 4
(Haiti) R Agénor | 4 | 4
Q | (Argentina) A Mancini | 6 | 6
(Australia) P Cash | 6 | 4 | 1
(Spain) J Aguilera | 3 | 6 | 6
(Netherlands) M Koevermans | 4 | 6 | 6
10 | (Germany) M Stich | 6 | 4 | 4
16 | (Czechoslovakia) K Nováček | 0 | 3
Q | (Italy) M Cierro | 6 | 6
(Sweden) P Lundgren | 2 | 2
(Argentina) H de la Peña | 6 | 6
(Italy) R Furlan | 6 | 6
(Peru) J Yzaga | 4 | 0
(Germany) E Jelen | 6 | 7^{9}
2 | (United States) A Agassi | 3 | 6^{7}

Second round
7 | (Sweden) J Svensson | 6 | 5 | 5
Q | (Argentina) A Mancini | 4 | 7 | 7
(Spain) J Aguilera | 2 | 2
(Netherlands) M Koevermans | 6 | 6
Q | (Italy) M Cierro | 5 | 1
(Argentina) H de la Peña | 7 | 6
(Italy) R Furlan | 6 | 3 | 6^{6}
(Germany) E Jelen | 2 | 6 | 7^{8}

Third round
Q | (Argentina) A Mancini | 6 | 4 | 7^{7}
(Netherlands) M Koevermans | 0 | 6 | 6^{1}
(Argentina) H de la Peña | 7^{7} | 6
(Germany) E Jelen | 6^{2} | 1

Quarterfinals
Q | (Argentina) A Mancini | 6 | 6
(Argentina) H de la Peña | 4 | 2
