= Cristina Cavina =

Italian tennis player

- Country (sports): Italy
- Born: 2 March 1969 (age 56)
- Prize money: $18,944

Singles
- Career record: 69–71
- Highest ranking: No. 221 (22 Jul 1991)

Doubles
- Career record: 8–12
- Highest ranking: No. 438 (12 Aug 1991)

Cristina Cavina (born 2 March 1969) is an Italian former professional tennis player.

Cavina is a native of Rome and trained at the Pirioli Tennis Club. She was a finalist in both the 14s and 16s age groups at the Italian national championships. On the professional tour she reached a best singles world ranking of 221 and was a main draw qualifier at the 1992 Italian Open.

Receiving a scholarship to Lynn University in 1992, Cavina earned NAIA All-American honors in each of her four seasons in collegiate tennis and amassed a 78–9 record in singles. She was named the NAIA Rookie of the Year in 1993 and NAIA Senior of the Year in 1996.

== ITF finals ==
=== Doubles: 1 (0–1) ===
Outcome	No.	Date	Tournament	Surface	Partner	Opponents	Score
Runner-up	1.	11 March 1990	Valencia, Spain	Clay	(Italy) Carmela Vitali	(Netherlands) Susan Gadroen (Netherlands) Jackie van Wijk	4–6, 0–6
