= 1991 Canadian Open – Women's doubles =

Women's doubles
- 1991 Canadian Open

Final
- Champions: (Soviet Union) Larisa Savchenko-Neiland (Soviet Union) Natalia Zvereva
- Runners-up: (West Germany) Claudia Kohde-Kilsch (Czechoslovakia) Helena Suková
- Score: 1–6, 7–5, 6–2

Details
- Draw: 28 (1 Q)
- Seeds: 8

Events
| Singles | men | women |
| Doubles | men | women |
- Canadian Open

Betsy Nagelsen and Gabriela Sabatini were the defending champions, but chose not to participate.

Larisa Savchenko-Neiland and Natalia Zvereva won the title, defeating Claudia Kohde-Kilsch and Helena Suková in the finals, 1–6, 7–5, 6–2.

== Seeds ==
The top four seeds received a bye to the second round.

1. (Soviet Union) Larisa Savchenko / (Soviet Union) Natalia Zvereva (champions)
2. (West Germany) Claudia Kohde-Kilsch / (Czechoslovakia) Helena Suková (final)
3. (Australia) Nicole Bradtke / (Australia) Elizabeth Smylie (semifinal)
4. (Canada) Jill Hetherington / (United States) Kathy Rinaldi (semifinal)
5. (Bulgaria) Magdalena Maleeva / (Switzerland) Manuela Maleeva-Fragniere (quarterfinal)
6. (United Kingdom) Jo Durie / (Bulgaria) Katerina Maleeva (first round)
7. (Peru) Laura Gildemeister / (France) Nathalie Tauziat (second round)
8. (Canada) Helen Kelesi / (Czechoslovakia) Regina Rajchrtová (second round)

== Draw ==
Key

- Q = Qualifier
- WC = Wild card
- LL = Lucky loser
- Alt = Alternate
- ITF = ITF entry
- PR = Protected ranking
- SR = Special ranking
- SE = Special exempt
- JE = Junior exempt
- JR = Junior Accelerator Programme entrant
- CO = College Accelerator Programme entrant
- NG = Next Gen Accelerator Program entrant
- w/o = Walkover
- r = Retired
- d = Defaulted

=== Finals ===
Semifinals
1 | (Soviet Union) Larisa Savchenko (Soviet Union) Natalia Zvereva | 6 | 6
3 | (Australia) Nicole Bradtke (Australia) Elizabeth Smylie | 4 | 2
4 | (Canada) Jill Hetherington (United States) Kathy Rinaldi | 5 | 1
2 | (West Germany) Claudia Kohde-Kilsch (Czechoslovakia) Helena Suková | 7 | 6

Final
1 | (Soviet Union) Larisa Savchenko (Soviet Union) Natalia Zvereva | 1 | 7 | 6
2 | (West Germany) Claudia Kohde-Kilsch (Czechoslovakia) Helena Suková | 6 | 5 | 2

=== Top half ===
First round
(United States) A Frazier (United States) L Spadea | 1 | 5
(Canada) R Collins (Canada) P Hy-Boulais | 6 | 7
(United States) C Benjamin (Austria) B Paulus | 6 | 6
(Canada) J Alexander-Brower (Canada) C Delisle | 1 | 4
(Israel) Y Segal (Netherlands) H ter Riet | 3 | 0
5 | (Bulgaria) M Maleeva (Switzerland) M Maleeva-Fragniere | 6 | 6
(Italy) S Farina Elia (Italy) K Piccolini | 3 | 5
(United States) L Glitz (United States) J Goodling | 6 | 7
(United States) J Emmons (Sweden) M Strandlund-Tomsvik | 4 | 7 | 5
(United Kingdom) A Rosenfield (Japan) R Hiraki | 6 | 6 | 7
(Poland) R Baranski (United Kingdom) S Gomer | 1 | 4
8 | (Canada) H Kelesi (Czechoslovakia) R Rajchrtová | 6 | 6

Second round
1 | (Soviet Union) L Savchenko (Soviet Union) N Zvereva | 6 | 6
(Canada) R Collins (Canada) P Hy-Boulais | 2 | 1
(United States) C Benjamin (Austria) B Paulus | d
5 | (Bulgaria) M Maleeva (Switzerland) M Maleeva-Fragniere
3 | (Australia) N Bradtke (Australia) E Smylie | 6 | 6
(Italy) S Farina Elia (Italy) K Piccolini | 2 | 0
(United Kingdom) A Rosenfield (Japan) R Hiraki | 3 | 6 | 7
8 | (Canada) H Kelesi (Czechoslovakia) R Rajchrtová | 6 | 3 | 5

Quarterfinals
1 | (Soviet Union) L Savchenko (Soviet Union) N Zvereva | 6 | 6 | 7
5 | (Bulgaria) M Maleeva (Switzerland) M Maleeva-Fragniere | 4 | 7 | 5
3 | (Australia) N Bradtke (Australia) E Smylie | 6 | 6
(United Kingdom) A Rosenfield (Japan) R Hiraki | 4 | 1

Semifinals
1 | (Soviet Union) Larisa Savchenko (Soviet Union) Natalia Zvereva | 6 | 6
3 | (Australia) Nicole Bradtke (Australia) Elizabeth Smylie | 4 | 2

=== Bottom half ===
First round
7 | (Peru) L Gildemeister (France) N Tauziat | 6 | 6
Q | (Canada) M Drake (Canada) S Italiano | 1 | 1
(Canada) M Bernard (Canada) S Jeyaseelan | 3 | 2
(United States) J Smoller (United States) M Werdel-Witmeyer | 6 | 6
(France) S Amiach (Australia) A Minter | 3 | 2
(Japan) K Date (Japan) A Kijimuta | 6 | 6
6 | (United Kingdom) J Durie (Bulgaria) K Maleeva | 4 | 7 | 3
(New Zealand) B Cordwell (Sweden) M Lindström | 6 | 5 | 6
(United Kingdom) J Salmon (United Kingdom) B Thompson | 3 | 7 | 2
(West Germany) E Pfaff (Finland) P Thorén | 6 | 6 | 6
(United States) A Henricksson (Japan) E Iida | 6 | 7
(United States) E De Lone (United States) A Keller | 3 | 6

Second round
7 | (Peru) L Gildemeister (France) N Tauziat | 5 | 2
(United States) J Smoller (United States) M Werdel-Witmeyer | 7 | 6
(Japan) K Date (Japan) A Kijimuta | 4 | 5
4 | (Canada) J Hetherington (United States) K Rinaldi | 6 | 7
(New Zealand) B Cordwell (Sweden) M Lindström | 6 | 7
(West Germany) E Pfaff (Finland) P Thorén | 4 | 5
(United States) A Henricksson (Japan) E Iida | 2 | 3
2 | (West Germany) C Kohde-Kilsch (Czechoslovakia) H Suková | 6 | 6

Quarterfinals
(United States) J Smoller (United States) M Werdel-Witmeyer | 4 | 1
4 | (Canada) J Hetherington (United States) K Rinaldi | 6 | 6
(New Zealand) B Cordwell (Sweden) M Lindström | 1 | 4
2 | (West Germany) C Kohde-Kilsch (Czechoslovakia) H Suková | 6 | 6

Semifinals
4 | (Canada) Jill Hetherington (United States) Kathy Rinaldi | 5 | 1
2 | (West Germany) Claudia Kohde-Kilsch (Czechoslovakia) Helena Suková | 7 | 6
