= 1991 Canadian Open – Men's singles =

Men's singles
- 1991 Canadian Open

Final
- Champion: (Soviet Union) Andrei Chesnokov
- Runner-up: (Czechoslovakia) Petr Korda
- Score: 3–6, 6–4, 6–3

Details
- Draw: 56
- Seeds: 16

Events
Singles	men	women
Doubles	men	women
← 1990 ·	Canadian Open	· 1992 →

Andrei Chesnokov defeated Petr Korda in the final, 3–6, 6–4, 6–3 to win the men's singles tennis title at the 1991 Canadian Open.

Michael Chang was the defending champion, but lost in the second round to Stefano Pescosolido.

== Seeds ==
1. (Czechoslovakia) Ivan Lendl (semifinals)
2. (United States) Jim Courier (semifinals)
3. (United States) Andre Agassi (second round)
4. (United States) Pete Sampras (second round)
5. (United States) Michael Chang (second round)
6. (Switzerland) Jakob Hlasek (quarterfinals)
7. (United States) John McEnroe (third round)
8. (United States) Brad Gilbert (third round)
9. (United States) Richey Reneberg (second round)
10. (United States) Derrick Rostagno (quarterfinals)
11. (Italy) Cristiano Caratti (first round)
12. (Soviet Union) Andrei Chesnokov (champion)
13. (United States) Patrick McEnroe (third round)
14. (Peru) Jaime Yzaga (first round)
15. (Australia) Wally Masur (third round)
16. (Israel) Amos Mansdorf (third round)

== Draw ==
=== Key ===
- Q = Qualifier
- WC = Wild card
- LL = Lucky loser
- Alt = Alternate
- SE = Special exempt
- PR = Protected ranking
- ITF = ITF entry
- JE = Junior exempt
- w/o = Walkover
- r = Retired
- d = Defaulted
- SR = Special ranking

=== Finals ===
Semifinals
1	(Czechoslovakia) Ivan Lendl	6^{4}	5
12	(Soviet Union) Andrei Chesnokov	7^{7}	7
(Czechoslovakia) Petr Korda	3	7^{7}	6
2	(United States) Jim Courier	6	6^{1}	2

Final
12	(Soviet Union) Andrei Chesnokov	3	6	6
(Czechoslovakia) Petr Korda	6	4	3

=== Top half ===
==== Section 1 ====
First round
(United States) B Pearce	4	1
(Israel) G Bloom	6	6
WC	(Canada) A Sznajder	4	3
(United States) J Tarango	6	6
(Australia) M Woodforde	3	4
15	(Australia) W Masur	6	6
9	(United States) R Reneberg	6	6
(United States) T Mayotte	3	1
(United States) J Grabb	4	6	7^{8}
Q	(Australia) J Morgan	6	4	6^{6}
(Germany) A Mronz	6	6
(United States) S Davis	4	3

Second round
1	(Czechoslovakia) I Lendl	4	6	6
(Israel) G Bloom	6	4	4
(United States) J Tarango	7^{7}	1	4
15	(Australia) W Masur	6^{5}	6	6
9	(United States) R Reneberg	7^{7}	2	5
(United States) J Grabb	6^{3}	6	7
(Germany) A Mronz	3	5
8	(United States) B Gilbert	6	7

Third round
1	(Czechoslovakia) I Lendl	6	3	6
15	(Australia) W Masur	3	6	4
(United States) J Grabb	4	6	6
8	(United States) B Gilbert	6	3	4

Quarterfinals
1	(Czechoslovakia) I Lendl	7^{10}	6^{7}	7
(United States) J Grabb	6^{8}	7^{9}	5

==== Section 2 ====
First round
(Japan) S Matsuoka	6^{4}	7^{7}	6
(France) A Boetsch	7^{7}	6^{2}	3
(Germany) P Baur	6	4	6^{5}
Q	(United States) C Garner	4	6	7^{7}
(United States) T Witsken	1	1
13	(United States) P McEnroe	6	6
12	(Soviet Union) A Chesnokov	6	6
(United States) D Goldie	1	2
WC	(Canada) S Lareau	3	7^{7}	6
Q	(United States) Ian Aler	6	6^{5}	4
(Sweden) H Holm	5	4
(Italy) S Pescosolido	7	6

Second round
4	(United States) P Sampras	6	4	6^{8}
(Japan) S Matsuoka	2	6	7^{10}
Q	(United States) C Garner	2	4
13	(United States) P McEnroe	6	6
12	(Soviet Union) A Chesnokov	4	6	6
WC	(Canada) S Lareau	6	1	3
(Italy) S Pescosolido	7^{8}	3	6
5	(United States) M Chang	6^{6}	6	3

Third round
(Japan) S Matsuoka	6	6
13	(United States) P McEnroe	4	3
12	(Soviet Union) A Chesnokov	6	6
(Italy) S Pescosolido	4	4

Quarterfinals
(Japan) S Matsuoka	2	6	5
12	(Soviet Union) A Chesnokov	6	3	7

=== Bottom half ===
==== Section 3 ====
First round
Q	(Australia) N Borwick	6	6
(United States) J Kriek	3	4
Q	(Australia) S Youl	6	6^{6}	7^{9}
(Mexico) L Herrera	3	7^{8}	6^{7}
WC	(Canada) C Pridham	6	3	7
11	(Italy) C Caratti	3	6	5
14	(Peru) J Yzaga	3	6	3
(France) G Raoux	6	1	6
LL	(United States) J Brown	2	5
WC	(Canada) M Laurendeau	6	7
Q	(Italy) G Pozzi	6	3	6^{4}
(Czechoslovakia) P Korda	3	6	7^{7}

Second round
6	(Switzerland) J Hlasek	2	6	6
Q	(Australia) N Borwick	6	4	4
Q	(Australia) S Youl	1	6	7
WC	(Canada) C Pridham	6	3	5
(France) G Raoux	3	7	6
WC	(Canada) M Laurendeau	6	5	0
(Czechoslovakia) P Korda	7^{7}	6
3	(United States) A Agassi	6^{3}	2

Third round
6	(Switzerland) J Hlasek	7^{8}	6
Q	(Australia) S Youl	6^{6}	4
(France) G Raoux	2	3
(Czechoslovakia) P Korda	6	6

Quarterfinals
6	(Switzerland) J Hlasek	6^{3}	4
(Czechoslovakia) P Korda	7^{7}	6

==== Section 4 ====
First round
(United States) J Arias	7^{7}	7^{13}
(Canada) G Connell	6^{3}	6^{11}
(France) J-P Fleurian	3	2
(Sweden) T Högstedt	6	6
(United States) D Pate	6	5	2
10	(United States) D Rostagno	3	7	6
16	(Israel) A Mansdorf	6	6
(India) R Krishnan	2	2
Q	(Czechoslovakia) S Doseděl	4	6	6^{5}
(Sweden) P Lundgren	6	3	7^{7}
(United States) M Washington	6	6
(Germany) M Zoecke	4	4

Second round
7	(United States) J McEnroe	6	6
(United States) J Arias	1	2
(Sweden) T Högstedt	3	1
10	(United States) D Rostagno	6	6
16	(Israel) A Mansdorf	6	6^{5}	6
(Sweden) P Lundgren	4	7^{7}	1
(United States) M Washington	5	3
2	(United States) J Courier	7	6

Third round
7	(United States) J McEnroe	2	6	6^{5}
10	(United States) D Rostagno	6	1	7^{7}
16	(Israel) A Mansdorf	3	6	3
2	(United States) J Courier	6	3	6

Quarterfinals
10	(United States) D Rostagno	3	3
2	(United States) J Courier	6	6
