= 1992 Italian Open (tennis) =

Tennis tournament

- Date: 4–10 May (women); 11–18 May (men)
- Edition: 49th
- Category: ATP Super 9 (ATP); Tier I Series (WTA)
- Prize money: $1,125,000 (men) $550,000 (women)
- Surface: Clay / outdoor
- Location: Rome, Italy
- Venue: Foro Italico

Champions

Men's singles
- (United States) Jim Courier

Women's singles
- (Argentina) Gabriela Sabatini

Men's doubles
- (Switzerland) Jakob Hlasek / (Switzerland) Marc Rosset

Women's doubles
- (Federal Republic of Yugoslavia) Monica Seles / (Czechoslovakia) Helena Suková
← 1991 ·	Italian Open	· 1993 →

The 1992 Italian Open was a tennis tournament played on outdoor clay courts. It was the 49th edition of the Italian Open, and was part of the ATP Super 9 of the 1992 ATP Tour, and of the Tier I Series of the 1992 WTA Tour. Both the men's and the women's events took place at the Foro Italico in Rome, Italy. The women's tournament was played from 4 May until 10 May 1992, and the men's tournament was played from 11 May until 18 May 1992. First-seeded Jim Courier and second-seeded Gabriela Sabatini won the singles titles. It was Sabatini's second consecutive singles title at the event and third in total, also winning in 1991 and 1988.

== Finals ==
=== Men's singles ===
(United States) Jim Courier defeated (Spain) Carlos Costa, 7–6^{(7–3)} 6–0, 6–4

- It was Courier's 4th singles title of the year and his 8th of his career. It was his 2nd Masters title of the year and his 4th overall.

=== Women's singles ===
(Argentina) Gabriela Sabatini defeated (Federal Republic of Yugoslavia) Monica Seles 7–5, 6–4

- It was Sabatini's 5th and last singles title of the year and the 25th of her career. It was her 2nd Tier I title of the year and her 6th overall.

=== Men's doubles ===
(Switzerland) Jakob Hlasek / (Switzerland) Marc Rosset defeated (South Africa) Wayne Ferreira / (Australia) Mark Kratzmann 6–4, 3–6, 6–1

=== Women's doubles ===
(Federal Republic of Yugoslavia) Monica Seles / (Czechoslovakia) Helena Suková defeated (Bulgaria) Katerina Maleeva / (Germany) Barbara Rittner 6–1, 6–2
