= 1991 Italian Open (tennis) =

- Date: 6–12 May (women); 13–20 May (men)
- Edition: 48th
- Prize money: $1,280,000 (men) $500,000 (women)
- Surface: Clay / outdoor
- Location: Rome, Italy
- Venue: Foro Italico

Champions

Men's singles
- (Spain) Emilio Sánchez

Women's singles
- (Argentina) Gabriela Sabatini

Men's doubles
- (Italy) Omar Camporese / (Croatia) Goran Ivanišević

Women's doubles
- (United States) Jennifer Capriati / (Socialist Federal Republic of Yugoslavia) Monica Seles
← 1990 ·	Italian Open	· 1992 →

The 1991 Italian Open (known as the Peugeot Italian Open for sponsorship reasons) was a tennis tournament played on outdoor clay courts. It was the 48th edition of the Italian Open, and was part of the ATP Super 9 of the 1991 ATP Tour, and of the Tier I Series of the 1991 WTA Tour. Both the men's and the women's events were held at the Foro Italico in Rome, Italy. The women's tournament was played from 6 May until 12 May 1991, and the men's tournament was played from 13 May until 20 May 1991. Ninth-seeded Emilio Sánchez and second-seeded Gabriela Sabatini won the singles titles.

== Finals ==
=== Men's singles ===
(Spain) Emilio Sánchez defeated (Argentina) Alberto Mancini 6–3, 6–1, 3–0 (retired)

- It was Sánchez 2nd title of the year and his 13th overall. It was his 1st career Masters title.

=== Women's singles ===
(Argentina) Gabriela Sabatini defeated (Socialist Federal Republic of Yugoslavia) Monica Seles 6–3, 6–2

- It was Sabatini's 5th title of the year and her 20th overall. It was her 3rd Tier I title of the year and her 4th overall. It was her 3rd title at the event, also winning in 1988 and 1989.

=== Men's doubles ===
(Italy) Omar Camporese / (Croatia) Goran Ivanišević defeated (United States) Luke Jensen / (Australia) Laurie Warder 6–2, 6–3

=== Women's doubles ===
(United States) Jennifer Capriati / (Socialist Federal Republic of Yugoslavia) Monica Seles defeated (Australia) Nicole Bradtke / (South Africa) Elna Reinach 7–5, 6–2
