= 1991 Canadian Open – Women's singles =

Women's singles
- 1991 Canadian Open

Final
- Champion: (United States) Jennifer Capriati
- Runner-up: (Bulgaria) Katerina Maleeva
- Score: 6–2, 6–3

Details
- Draw: 56 (8 Q)
- Seeds: 16

Events
Singles	men	women
Doubles	men	women
- Canadian Open

Jennifer Capriati defeated Katerina Maleeva in the final, 6–2, 6–3 to win the women's singles tennis title at the 1991 Canadian Open.

Steffi Graf was the reigning champion, but chose not to participate.

== Seeds ==
The top eight seeds received a bye to the second round.

1. (Argentina) Gabriela Sabatini (semifinal)
2. (Switzerland) Manuela Maleeva-Fragniere (semifinal)
3. (United States) Jennifer Capriati (champion)
4. (Bulgaria) Katerina Maleeva (final)
5. (France) Nathalie Tauziat (third round)
6. (Czechoslovakia) Helena Suková (quarterfinal)
7. n/a
8. (United States) Amy Frazier (quarterfinal)
9. (Soviet Union) Natalia Zvereva (quarterfinal)
10. (Peru) Laura Gildemeister (quarterfinal)
11. (Canada) Helen Kelesi (third round)
12. (Japan) Naoko Sawamatsu (third round)
13. (United States) Marianne Werdel-Witmeyer (second round)
14. (Italy) Katia Piccolini (first round)
15. (West Germany) Claudia Kohde-Kilsch (first round)
16. (Czechoslovakia) Regina Rajchrtová (third round)

== Draw ==
Key

- Q = Qualifier
- WC = Wild card
- LL = Lucky loser
- Alt = Alternate
- ITF = ITF entry
- PR = Protected ranking
- SR = Special ranking
- SE = Special exempt
- JE = Junior exempt
- JR = Junior Accelerator Programme entrant
- CO = College Accelerator Programme entrant
- NG = Next Gen Accelerator Program entrant
- w/o = Walkover
- r = Retired
- d = Defaulted

=== Finals ===
Quarterfinals
1	(Argentina) Gabriela Sabatini	6	6
6	(Czechoslovakia) Helena Suková	3	2
3	(United States) Jennifer Capriati	6	6
9	(Soviet Union) Natalia Zvereva	1	1
10	(Peru) Laura Gildemeister	2	2
4	(Bulgaria) Katerina Maleeva	6	6
8	(United States) Amy Frazier	2	6
2	(Switzerland) Manuela Maleeva-Fragniere	6	7

Semifinals
1	(Argentina) Gabriela Sabatini	4	3^{r}
3	(United States) Jennifer Capriati	6	2
4	(Bulgaria) Katerina Maleeva	6	1
2	(Switzerland) Manuela Maleeva-Fragniere	4	0^{r}

Final
3	(United States) Jennifer Capriati	6	6
4	(Bulgaria) Katerina Maleeva	2	3

=== Top half ===
==== Section 1 ====
First round
Q	(Sweden) M Lindström	4	6	3
(Italy) S Farina Elia	6	4	6
(Canada) S Jeyaseelan	4	6	3
(Japan) K Date	6	4	6
(Canada) M Bernard	3	6	3
11	(Canada) H Kelesi	6	4	6
15	(West Germany) C Kohde-Kilsch	6	4	6
(Soviet Union) L Savchenko	4	6	7
(New Zealand) B Cordwell	3	6	3
(Japan) M Endo	6	4	6
(United Kingdom) J Durie	6	2	2
(Sweden) M Strandlund-Tomsvik	3	6	6

Second round
1	(Argentina) G Sabatini	6	6
(Italy) S Farina Elia	0	0
(Japan) K Date	4	4
11	(Canada) H Kelesi	6	6
(Soviet Union) L Savchenko	1	1
(Japan) M Endo	6	6
(Sweden) M Strandlund-Tomsvik	6	4
6	(Czechoslovakia) H Suková	7	6

Third round
1	(Argentina) G Sabatini	7	6
11	(Canada) H Kelesi	6	2
(Japan) M Endo	1	0
6	(Czechoslovakia) H Suková	6	6

Quarterfinals
1	(Argentina) Gabriela Sabatini	6	6
6	(Czechoslovakia) Helena Suková	3	2

==== Section 2 ====
First round
(United States) E De Lone	6	6	6
Q	(Japan) H Nagano	4	7	0
(United Kingdom) S Gomer	6	6
Q	(Canada) S Italiano	3	2
(United States) A Keller	2	7	6
13	(United States) M Werdel-Witmeyer	6	6	7
9	(Soviet Union) N Zvereva	6	6
(Israel) Y Segal	1	3
(Austria) S Dopfer	6	0	1
(Canada) P Hy-Boulais	1	6	6
Q	(United States) C Benjamin	1	2
Q	(United States) J Watanabe	6	6

Second round
3	(United States) J Capriati	6	6
(United States) E De Lone	4	0
(United Kingdom) S Gomer	6	7
13	(United States) M Werdel-Witmeyer	3	5
9	(Soviet Union) N Zvereva	7	1	7
(Canada) P Hy-Boulais	5	6	5
Q	(United States) J Watanabe	6	6
(United Kingdom) J Salmon	0	1

Third round
3	(United States) J Capriati	6	6
(United Kingdom) S Gomer	2	3
9	(Soviet Union) N Zvereva	7	6
Q	(United States) J Watanabe	6	0

Quarterfinals
3	(United States) Jennifer Capriati	6	6
9	(Soviet Union) Natalia Zvereva	1	1

=== Bottom half ===
==== Section 1 ====
First round
(Australia) A Minter	7	7
(Poland) R Baranski	5	5
(Australia) L Field	4	2
(United States) K Rinaldi	6	6
(United States) A Henricksson	5	7	4
10	(Peru) L Gildemeister	7	5	6
12	(Japan) N Sawamatsu	6	6
(Sweden) C Dahlman	2	4
(Finland) P Thorén	6	6
Q	(United Kingdom) S Loosemore	2	3
(United States) A Leand	1	^{r}
(Bulgaria) M Maleeva	6

Second round
5	(France) N Tauziat	6	6
(Australia) A Minter	1	0
(United States) K Rinaldi	2	6
10	(Peru) L Gildemeister	6	7
12	(Japan) N Sawamatsu	6	5	6
(Finland) P Thorén	4	7	2
(Bulgaria) M Maleeva	3	3
4	(Bulgaria) K Maleeva	6	6

Third round
5	(France) N Tauziat	3	6	4
10	(Peru) L Gildemeister	6	4	6
12	(Japan) N Sawamatsu	1	3
4	(Bulgaria) K Maleeva	6	6

Quarterfinals
10	(Peru) Laura Gildemeister	2	2
4	(Bulgaria) Katerina Maleeva	6	6

==== Section 2 ====
First round
Q	(Canada) M Drake	1	0
(Australia) N Bradtke	6	6
(Australia) E Smylie	0	1
(United States) D Graham	6	6
(United States) J Emmons	1	6	6
14	(Italy) K Piccolini	6	2	3
16	(Czechoslovakia) R Rajchrtová	6	7
(West Germany) E Pfaff	2	5
(Japan) A Kijimuta	6	6	1
(Canada) R Collins	1	7	6
(Japan) R Hiraki	7	6
Q	(France) S Amiach	5	3

Second round
8	(United States) A Frazier	7	6
(Australia) N Bradtke	5	3
(United States) D Graham	6	6
(United States) J Emmons	2	3
16	(Czechoslovakia) R Rajchrtová	6	6
(Canada) R Collins	3	4
(Japan) R Hiraki	5	0
2	(Switzerland) M Maleeva-Fragniere	7	6

Third round
8	(United States) A Frazier	6	1	6
(United States) D Graham	3	6	1
16	(Czechoslovakia) R Rajchrtová	1	2
2	(Switzerland) M Maleeva-Fragniere	6	6

Quarterfinals
8	(United States) Amy Frazier	2	6
2	(Switzerland) Manuela Maleeva-Fragniere	6	7
