= 1991 Canadian Open (tennis) =

- Date: July 22 – July 28 (men); August 5 – August 11 (women)
- Edition: 102nd
- Surface: Hard / outdoor

Champions

Men's singles
- (Soviet Union) Andrei Chesnokov

Women's singles
- (United States) Jennifer Capriati

Men's doubles
- (United States) Patrick Galbraith / (United States) Todd Witsken

Women's doubles
- (Soviet Union) Larisa Savchenko-Neiland / (Soviet Union) Natalia Zvereva
- Canadian Open

The 1991 Canadian Open was a tennis tournament played on outdoor hard courts. It was the 102nd edition of the Canada Masters, and was part of the ATP Super 9 of the 1991 ATP Tour, and of the Tier I Series of the 1991 WTA Tour. The men's event took place at the Uniprix Stadium in Montreal, Canada from July 22 through July 28, 1991, and the women's event at the National Tennis Centre in Toronto, Ontario, Canada from August 5 through August 11, 1991.

== Finals ==
=== Men's singles ===
(Soviet Union) Andrei Chesnokov defeated (Czechoslovakia) Petr Korda, 3–6, 6–4, 6–3

- It was Andrei Chesnokov's 1st title of the year and his 7th overall. It was his 1st Masters title of the year and his 2nd overall.

=== Women's singles ===
(United States) Jennifer Capriati defeated (Bulgaria) Katerina Maleeva, 6–2, 6–3

- It was Jennifer Capriati's 2nd title of the year and her 3rd overall. It was her 1st Tier I title.

=== Men's doubles ===
(United States) Patrick Galbraith / (United States) Todd Witsken defeated (Canada) Grant Connell / (Canada) Glenn Michibata, 6–4, 3–6, 6–1

=== Women's doubles ===
(Soviet Union) Larisa Savchenko-Neiland / (Soviet Union) Natalia Zvereva defeated (West Germany) Claudia Kohde-Kilsch / (Czechoslovakia) Helena Suková 1–6, 7–5, 6–2
