= 1991 Italian Open – Men's doubles =

Men's doubles
- 1991 Italian Open

Final
- Champions: (Italy) Omar Camporese; (Croatia) Goran Ivanišević
- Runners-up: (United States) Luke Jensen; (Australia) Laurie Warder
- Score: 6–2, 6–3

Details
- Draw: 32 (2Q)
- Seeds: 8

Events
Singles	men	women
Doubles	men	women
- Italian Open

Sergio Casal and Emilio Sánchez were the defending champions, but lost to Omar Camporese and Goran Ivanišević in the quarterfinals. Camporese and Ivanisevic went on to win the title, defeating Luke Jensen and Laurie Warder in the finals, 6–2, 6–3.

== Seeds ==
1. (Spain) Sergio Casal / (Spain) Emilio Sánchez (quarterfinals)
2. (Germany) Udo Riglewski / (Germany) Michael Stich (first round)
3. (United States) Jim Courier / (United States) Patrick McEnroe (first round)
4. (Australia) Mark Woodforde / (Australia) Todd Woodbridge (first round)
5. (South Africa) Wayne Ferreira / (South Africa) Danie Visser (first round)
6. (Netherlands) Paul Haarhuis / (Netherlands) Mark Koevermans (first round)
7. (United States) Luke Jensen / (Australia) Laurie Warder (finals)
8. (United Kingdom) Jeremy Bates / (United Kingdom) Nick Brown (first round)

== Draw ==
Key

- Q = Qualifier
- WC = Wild card
- LL = Lucky loser
- Alt = Alternate
- ITF = ITF entry
- PR = Protected ranking
- SR = Special ranking
- SE = Special exempt
- JE = Junior exempt
- JR = Junior Accelerator Programme entrant
- CO = College Accelerator Programme entrant
- NG = Next Gen Accelerator Program entrant
- w/o = Walkover
- r = Retired
- d = Defaulted

=== Finals ===
Semifinals

Final

- (Italy) Omar Camporese
- (Socialist Federal Republic of Yugoslavia) Goran Ivanišević
4
6
6

- (Australia) Pat Cash
- (Switzerland) Jakob Hlasek
6
3
0

- (Italy) Omar Camporese
- (Socialist Federal Republic of Yugoslavia) Goran Ivanišević
6
6

7
- (United States) Luke Jensen
- (Australia) Laurie Warder
2
3

- (Argentina) Gustavo Luza
- (Brazil) Cássio Motta
6
4
4

7
- (United States) Luke Jensen
- (Australia) Laurie Warder
3
6
6

=== Top half ===
First round

Second round

Quarterfinals

Semifinals

1
- (Spain) S Casal
- (Spain) E Sánchez
4
7
6

Q
- (Netherlands) R Krajicek
- (Sweden) L Wahlgren
6
6
3

1
- (Spain) S Casal
- (Spain) E Sánchez
4
6
7

- (Italy) M Cierro
- (Italy) S Colombo
3
4

- (Iran) M Bahrami
- (France) É Winogradsky
6
3
5

- (Iran) M Bahrami
- (France) É Winogradsky
6
6

1
- (Spain) S Casal
- (Spain) E Sánchez
4
6
1

- (United States) S DeVries
- (Australia) D McPherson
6
5

- (Italy) O Camporese
- (Croatia) G Ivanišević
6
3
6

- (Italy) O Camporese
- (Croatia) G Ivanišević
7
7

- (Italy) O Camporese
- (Croatia) G Ivanišević
6
6

- (Brazil) L Mattar
- (Venezuela) N Pereira
6
7

- (Brazil) L Mattar
- (Venezuela) N Pereira
3
1

8
- (United Kingdom) J Bates
- (United Kingdom) N Brown
3
6

- (Italy) O Camporese
- (Croatia) G Ivanišević
4
6
6

4
- (Australia) M Woodforde
- (Australia) T Woodbridge
3
7
6

- (Australia) P Cash
- (Switzerland) J Hlasek
6
3
0

- (Spain) T Carbonell
- (Belgium) L Pimek
6
5
7

- (Spain) T Carbonell
- (Belgium) L Pimek
6
6
6

- (France) H Leconte
- (France) Y Noah
6
6

- (France) H Leconte
- (France) Y Noah
7
4
4

- (Sweden) R Båthman
- (Sweden) R Bergh
2
3

- (Spain) T Carbonell
- (Belgium) L Pimek
6
4

- (United States) C Beckman
- (United States) J Brown
6
0
6

- (Australia) P Cash
- (Switzerland) J Hlasek
7
6

- (Argentina) H de la Peña
- (Australia) J Stoltenberg
3
6
7

- (Argentina) H de la Peña
- (Australia) J Stoltenberg
4
4

- (Australia) P Cash
- (Switzerland) J Hlasek
5
6
6

- (Australia) P Cash
- (Switzerland) J Hlasek
6
6

6
- (Netherlands) P Haarhuis
- (Netherlands) M Koevermans
7
3
4

=== Bottom half ===
First round

Second round

Quarterfinals

Semifinals

5
- (South Africa) W Ferreira
- (South Africa) D Visser
6
3
4

- (Netherlands) M Schapers
- (Netherlands) J Siemerink
3
6
6

- (Netherlands) M Schapers
- (Netherlands) J Siemerink
4
7
6

Q
- (Spain) JC Baguena
- (Spain) C Costa
6
5

- (Argentina) G Luza
- (Brazil) C Motta
6
6
7

- (Argentina) G Luza
- (Brazil) C Motta
7
7

- (Argentina) G Luza
- (Brazil) C Motta
7
6

- (Netherlands) T Nijssen
- (Czechoslovakia) C Suk
6
3
1

- (United States) B Gilbert
- (United States) P Sampras
5
3

- (Mexico) L Lavalle
- (Mexico) J Lozano
4
6
6

- (Mexico) L Lavalle
- (Mexico) J Lozano
5
6
3

- (United States) B Gilbert
- (United States) P Sampras
6
6

- (United States) B Gilbert
- (United States) P Sampras
7
4
6

3
- (United States) J Courier
- (United States) P McEnroe
4
4

- (Argentina) G Luza
- (Brazil) C Motta
6
4
4

7
- (United States) L Jensen
- (Australia) L Warder
6
6

7
- (United States) L Jensen
- (Australia) L Warder
3
6
6

- (Italy) F Mordegan
- (Spain) F Roig
4
4

7
- (United States) L Jensen
- (Australia) L Warder
7
7

- (Sweden) P Henricsson
- (Sweden) N Utgren
3
4

- (United States) S Cannon
- (The Bahamas) R Smith
6
6

- (United States) S Cannon
- (The Bahamas) R Smith
6
6

7
- (United States) L Jensen
- (Australia) L Warder
6
6

- (Czechoslovakia) K Nováček
- (Czechoslovakia) T Šmid
5
6

- (Australia) B Dyke
- (Sweden) P Lundgren
1
3

- (Czechoslovakia) V Flegl
- (Croatia) G Prpić
7
7

- (Czechoslovakia) V Flégl
- (Croatia) G Prpić
5
6
1

- (Australia) B Dyke
- (Sweden) P Lundgren
6
6

- (Australia) B Dyke
- (Sweden) P Lundgren
7
3
6

2
- (Germany) Udo Riglewski
- (Germany) Michael Stich
2
1
