= 1991 Italian Open – Women's singles =

Women's singles
- 1991 Italian Open

Final
- Champion: (Argentina) Gabriela Sabatini
- Runner-up: (Socialist Federal Republic of Yugoslavia) Monica Seles
- Score: 6–3, 6–2

Details
- Draw: 56 (8 Q)
- Seeds: 16

Events
Singles	men	women
Doubles	men	women
← 1990 ·	Italian Open	· 1992 →

Gabriela Sabatini defeated the defending champion Monica Seles in the final, 6–3, 6–2 to win the women's singles tennis title at the 1991 Italian Open.

Sabatini dropped just 13 games in her five matches, 1 less than the 14 games Seles dropped in the previous year’s tournament.

== Seeds ==
The top eight seeds received a bye to the second round.

1. (Socialist Federal Republic of Yugoslavia) Monica Seles (final)
2. (Argentina) Gabriela Sabatini (champion)
3. (United States) Martina Navratilova (quarterfinal)
4. (United States) Mary Joe Fernández (semifinal)
5. (Spain) Conchita Martínez (semifinal)
6. (Switzerland) Manuela Maleeva-Fragniere (third round)
7. (United States) Jennifer Capriati (quarterfinal)
8. (Soviet Union) Leila Meskhi (quarterfinal)
9. (France) Nathalie Tauziat (third round)
10. n/a
11. (Italy) Sandra Cecchini (first round)
12. (Canada) Helen Kelesi (third round)
13. (Germany) Anke Huber (third round)
14. (Argentina) Mercedes Paz (first round)
15. (Bulgaria) Magdalena Maleeva (first round)
16. (Italy) Federica Bonsignori (first round)

== Draw ==
=== Key ===
- Q = Qualifier
- WC = Wild card
- LL = Lucky loser
- Alt = Alternate
- ITF = ITF entry
- PR = Protected ranking
- SR = Special ranking
- SE = Special exempt
- JE = Junior exempt
- JR = Junior Accelerator Programme entrant
- CO = College Accelerator Programme entrant
- NG = Next Gen Accelerator Program entrant
- w/o = Walkover
- r = Retired
- d = Defaulted

=== Finals ===
Quarterfinals
1	(Socialist Federal Republic of Yugoslavia) Monica Seles	6	6
8	(Soviet Union) Leila Meskhi	0	1
4	(United States) Mary Joe Fernández	6	6
Q	(Argentina) Bettina Fulco	3	2
5	(Spain) Conchita Martínez	6	6
3	(United States) Martina Navratilova	3	4
7	(United States) Jennifer Capriati	0	2
2	(Argentina) Gabriela Sabatini	6	6

Semifinals
1	(Socialist Federal Republic of Yugoslavia) Monica Seles	7	2	6
4	(United States) Mary Joe Fernández	5	6	4
5	(Spain) Conchita Martínez	1	0
2	(Argentina) Gabriela Sabatini	6	6

Final
1	(Socialist Federal Republic of Yugoslavia) Monica Seles	3	2
2	(Argentina) Gabriela Sabatini	6	6

=== Top half ===
==== Section 1 ====
First round
(Australia) N Provis	6	6
(Italy) L Golarsa	4	1
(Italy) K Piccolini	6	7
LL	(France) S Testud	2	6
(France) K Quentrec	6	7
11	(Italy) S Cecchini	4	5
(South Africa) R Fairbank-Nideffer	6	6
(Italy) N Baudone	2	3
(United States) A Grossman	4	6	6
(Japan) A Kijimuta	6	2	7
(Italy) L Ferrando	6	6
(Sweden) C Lindqvist	2	1

Second round
1	(Socialist Federal Republic of Yugoslavia) M Seles	6	6
(Australia) N Provis	3	1
(Italy) K Piccolini	6	6
(France) K Quentrec	2	3
(South Africa) R Fairbank-Nideffer	3	6	5
(Japan) A Kijimuta	6	4	7
(Italy) L Ferrando	6	0
8	(Soviet Union) L Meskhi	7	6

Third round
1	(Socialist Federal Republic of Yugoslavia) M Seles	6	6
(Italy) K Piccolini	3	1
(Japan) A Kijimuta	1	7	1
8	(Soviet Union) L Meskhi	6	6	6

Quarterfinals
1	(Socialist Federal Republic of Yugoslavia) Monica Seles	6	6
8	(Soviet Union) Leila Meskhi	0	1

==== Section 2 ====
First round
Q	(Italy) L Jachia	6	6	6
(United States) H Cioffi	7	2	3
(France) N Herreman	6	6
(Italy) R Grande	2	1
(West Germany) B Rittner	6	6
16	(Italy) F Bonsignori	2	3
14	(Argentina) M Paz	1	4
Q	(Argentina) B Fulco	6	6
Q	(Soviet Union) E Maniokova	7	6
Q	(France) I Demongeot	5	1
Q	(Italy) S Lucchi	3	6	3
(Argentina) F Labat	6	1	6

Second round
4	(United States) M Joe Fernández	7	6
Q	(Italy) L Jachia	5	3
(France) N Herreman	4	7	6
(West Germany) B Rittner	6	5	7
Q	(Argentina) B Fulco	7	6
Q	(Soviet Union) E Maniokova	6	4
(Argentina) F Labat	2	1
6	(Switzerland) M Maleeva-Fragniere	6	6

Third round
4	(United States) M Joe Fernández	6	6
(West Germany) B Rittner	1	3
Q	(Argentina) B Fulco	2	6	6
6	(Switzerland) M Maleeva-Fragniere	6	4	1

Quarterfinals
4	(United States) Mary Joe Fernández	6	6
Q	(Argentina) Bettina Fulco	3	2

=== Bottom half ===
==== Section 1 ====
First round
(United Kingdom) S Loosemore	2	4
Q	(United States) S Martin	6	6
(Australia) R McQuillan	6	6
Q	(Italy) F Fortuni	2	0
(United States) G Helgeson	2	0
12	(Canada) H Kelesi	6	6
13	(Germany) A Huber	6	6
(France) A Dechaume	1	3
(Czechoslovakia) E Švíglerová	6	6	5
(Italy) L Garrone	2	7	7
(Czechoslovakia) R Rajchrtová	5	6	4
(South Africa) E Reinach	7	4	6

Second round
5	(Spain) C Martínez	6	6
Q	(United States) S Martin	3	3
(Australia) R McQuillan	2	3
12	(Canada) H Kelesi	6	6
13	(Germany) A Huber	6	6	6
(Italy) L Garrone	7	1	2
(South Africa) E Reinach	3	0
3	(United States) M Navratilova	6	6

Third round
5	(Spain) C Martínez	6	6
12	(Canada) H Kelesi	1	1
13	(Germany) A Huber	6	1	3
3	(United States) M Navratilova	3	6	6

Quarterfinals
5	(Spain) Conchita Martínez	6	6
3	(United States) Martina Navratilova	3	4

==== Section 2 ====
First round
(West Germany) C Kohde-Kilsch	2	4
(Argentina) C Tessi	6	6
(United States) C Cunningham	7	6
(Italy) S Farina	5	4
(France) J Halard	3	6	7
15	(Bulgaria) M Maleeva	6	4	6
9	(France) N Tauziat	6	6	6
Q	(Canada) R Alter	2	7	4
(United Kingdom) J Durie	4	5
(Czechoslovakia) A Strnadová	6	7
(South Africa) A Coetzer	6	6
(Italy) F Romano	2	4

Second round
7	(United States) J Capriati	7	7
(Argentina) C Tessi	5	6
(United States) C Cunningham	6	0	2
(France) J Halard	3	6	6
9	(France) N Tauziat	3	6	6
(Czechoslovakia) A Strnadová	6	3	3
(South Africa) A Coetzer	2	2
2	(Argentina) G Sabatini	6	6

Third round
7	(United States) J Capriati	6	6
(France) J Halard	2	4
9	(France) N Tauziat	0	1
2	(Argentina) G Sabatini	6	6

Quarterfinals
7	(United States) Jennifer Capriati	0	2
2	(Argentina) Gabriela Sabatini	6	6
