= 1991 Italian Open – Women's doubles =

Women's doubles
- 1991 Italian Open

Final
- Champions: (United States) Jennifer Capriati (Socialist Federal Republic of Yugoslavia) Monica Seles
- Runners-up: (Australia) Nicole Bradtke (South Africa) Elna Reinach
- Score: 7–5, 6–2

Details
- Draw: 28 (1 Q)
- Seeds: 8

Events
Singles	men	women
Doubles	men	women
← 1990 ·	Italian Open	· 1992 →

Helen Kelesi and Monica Seles were the defending champions, but chose not to participate together. Kelesi played alongside Andrea Temesvári-Trunkos, but lost in the quarterfinal to Mary Joe Fernández and Martina Navratilova.

Seles successfully defended her title, partnering Jennifer Capriati, by defeating Nicole Provis and Elna Reinach in the finals, 7–5, 6–2.

== Seeds ==
All seeds received a bye to the second round.

1. (United States) Mary Joe Fernández / (United States) Martina Navratilova (semifinal)
2. (Australia) Nicole Provis / (South Africa) Elna Reinach (final)
3. n/a
4. (South Africa) Rosalyn Fairbank-Nideffer / (Argentina) Mercedes Paz (quarterfinal)
5. (United States) Jennifer Capriati / (Socialist Federal Republic of Yugoslavia) Monica Seles (champion)
6. (Canada) Helen Kelesi / (Hungary) Andrea Temesvári-Trunkos (quarterfinal)
7. (Australia) Rachel McQuillan / (France) Catherine Tanvier (quarterfinal)
8. (Italy) Sandra Cecchini / (Italy) Laura Garrone (second round)

== Draw ==
=== Key ===
- Q = Qualifier
- WC = Wild card
- LL = Lucky loser
- Alt = Alternate
- ITF = ITF entry
- PR = Protected ranking
- SR = Special ranking
- SE = Special exempt
- JE = Junior exempt
- JR = Junior Accelerator Programme entrant
- CO = College Accelerator Programme entrant
- NG = Next Gen Accelerator Program entrant
- w/o = Walkover
- r = Retired
- d = Defaulted

=== Finals ===
Semifinals
1	(United States) Mary Joe Fernández (United States) Martina Navratilova	6	6	2
5	(United States) Jennifer Capriati (Socialist Federal Republic of Yugoslavia) Monica Seles	7	3	6
(France) Isabelle Demongeot (France) Nathalie Tauziat	2	6	1
2	(Australia) Nicole Provis (South Africa) Elna Reinach	6	1	6

Final
5	(United States) Jennifer Capriati (Socialist Federal Republic of Yugoslavia) Monica Seles	7	6
2	(Australia) Nicole Provis (South Africa) Elna Reinach	5	2

=== Top half ===
First round
(United States) A Grossman (Czechoslovakia) A Strnadová	6	3	4
(Italy) S Farina (Italy) R Grande	3	6	6
(France) J Halard (West Germany) A Huber	6	6
(Soviet Union) E Maniokova (France) S Testud	1	4
(United States) H Cioffi (South Africa) R Field	6	6	2
6	(Canada) H Kelesi (Hungary) A Temesvári-Trunkos	4	7	6
(Italy) N Baudone (Italy) K Piccolini	1	6	6
(Argentina) B Fulco (Czechoslovakia) E Švíglerová	6	1	2
(United States) C Benjamin (United States) G Helgeson	6	6
Q	(Italy) E Brusati (Italy) C Piccini	3	2
(Italy) S Attili (Italy) E Savoldi	1	1
8	(Italy) S Cecchini (Italy) L Garrone	6	6

Second round
1	(United States) M Joe Fernández (United States) M Navratilova	6	6
(Italy) S Farina (Italy) R Grande	3	3
(France) J Halard (West Germany) A Huber	6	3	0
6	(Canada) H Kelesi (Hungary) A Temesvári-Trunkos	3	6	6
5	(United States) J Capriati (Socialist Federal Republic of Yugoslavia) M Seles	6	6
(Italy) N Baudone (Italy) K Piccolini	2	3
(United States) C Benjamin (United States) G Helgeson	7	6
8	(Italy) S Cecchini (Italy) L Garrone	6	3

Quarterfinals
1	(United States) M Joe Fernández (United States) M Navratilova	6	6
6	(Canada) H Kelesi (Hungary) A Temesvári-Trunkos	1	1
5	(United States) J Capriati (Socialist Federal Republic of Yugoslavia) M Seles	6	6
(United States) C Benjamin (United States) G Helgeson	3	0

Semifinals
1	(United States) Mary Joe Fernández (United States) Martina Navratilova	6	6	2
5	(United States) Jennifer Capriati (Socialist Federal Republic of Yugoslavia) Monica Seles	7	3	6

=== Bottom half ===
First round
(France) I Demongeot (France) N Tauziat	5	6	6
(United Kingdom) J Durie (France) N Herreman	7	4	4
(France) A Dechaume (Argentina) F Labat	7	6
(United States) J Fuchs (United States) J Smoller	6	3
(Italy) L Ferrando (Italy) L Golarsa	6	2
(Canada) R Alter (Australia) M Jaggard	7	6
7	(Australia) R McQuillan (France) C Tanvier	6	6
(Soviet Union) L Meskhi (Czechoslovakia) R Rajchrtová	1	2
(South Africa) A Coetzer (United States) C Cunningham	4	6	6
(United States) L Glitz (Japan) A Kijimuta	6	1	3
(Italy) A Canapi (Italy) C Salvi	5	1
(Australia) T Morton (Australia) A Scott	7	6

Second round
(France) I Demongeot (France) N Tauziat	6	6
(France) A Dechaume (Argentina) F Labat	3	1
(Canada) R Alter (Australia) M Jaggard	6	2
4	(South Africa) R Fairbank-Nideffer (Argentina) M Paz	7	6
7	(Australia) R McQuillan (France) C Tanvier	6	6
(South Africa) A Coetzer (United States) C Cunningham	2	3
(Australia) T Morton (Australia) A Scott	5	1
2	(Australia) N Provis (South Africa) E Reinach	7	6

Quarterfinals
(France) I Demongeot (France) N Tauziat	6	6
4	(South Africa) R Fairbank-Nideffer (Argentina) M Paz	4	2
7	(Australia) R McQuillan (France) C Tanvier	3	6	3
2	(Australia) N Provis (South Africa) E Reinach	6	0	6

Semifinals
(France) Isabelle Demongeot (France) Nathalie Tauziat	2	6	1
2	(Australia) Nicole Provis (South Africa) Elna Reinach	6	1	6
