= 1992 WTA Tier I Series =

Women's professional tennis tour

Details
- Duration: March 2 – August 23
- Edition: 3rd
- Tournaments: 6

Achievements (singles)
- Most titles: (Argentina) Gabriela Sabatini (Spain) Arantxa Sánchez (Germany) Steffi Graf (2)
- Most finals: (Spain) Arantxa Sánchez (Germany) Steffi Graf (3)

The WTA Tier I events are part of the elite tour for professional women's tennis organised by the WTA called the WTA Tour.

== Tournaments ==
Tournament	Country	Location	Surface	Date	Prize money
Virginia Slims of Florida	United States	Boca Raton	Hard	Mar 2 – 15	$550,000
Lipton International Players Championships	United States	Key Biscayne	Hard	Mar 16 – 22	$800,000
Family Circle Cup	United States	Hilton Head Island	Clay	Mar 30 – Apr 5	$550,000
Peugeot Italian Open	Italy	Rome	Clay	May 4 – 10	$550,000
Lufthansa Cup	Germany	Berlin	Clay	May 11 – 17	$550,000
Matinee Ltd. Canadian Open	Canada	Montreal	Hard	Aug 17 – 23	$550,000

== Results ==
* First-time champion

Tournament	Singles champions	Runners-up	Score	Doubles champions	Runners-up	Score
Boca Raton Singles – Doubles	(Germany) Steffi Graf	(Spain) Conchita Martínez	3–6, 6–2, 6–0	(Latvia) Larisa Neiland (Commonwealth of Independent States) Natalia Zvereva	(United States) Linda Harvey-Wild (Spain) Conchita Martínez	6–2, 6–2
Miami Singles – Doubles	(Spain) Arantxa Sánchez Vicario*	(Argentina) Gabriela Sabatini	6–1, 6–4	(Spain) Arantxa Sánchez Vicario (Latvia) Larisa Neiland	(Canada) Jill Hetherington (United States) Kathy Rinaldi	7–5, 5–7, 6–3
Hilton Head Singles – Doubles	(Argentina) Gabriela Sabatini	(Spain) Conchita Martínez	6–1, 6–4	(Spain) Arantxa Sánchez Vicario (Commonwealth of Independent States) Natalia Zvereva	(Czechoslovakia) Jana Novotná (Latvia) Larisa Neiland	6–4, 6–2
Rome Singles – Doubles	(Argentina) Gabriela Sabatini	(Federal Republic of Yugoslavia) Monica Seles	7–5, 6–4	(Federal Republic of Yugoslavia) Monica Seles (Czechoslovakia) Helena Suková	(Bulgaria) Katerina Maleeva (Germany) Barbara Rittner	6–1, 6–2
Berlin Singles – Doubles	(Germany) Steffi Graf	(Spain) Arantxa Sánchez Vicario	4–6, 7–5, 6–2	(Czechoslovakia) Jana Novotná (Latvia) Larisa Neiland	(United States) Gigi Fernández (Commonwealth of Independent States) Natalia Zvereva	7–6^{(7–5)}, 4–6, 7–5
Montréal Singles – Doubles	(Spain) Arantxa Sánchez Vicario	(Federal Republic of Yugoslavia) Monica Seles	6–3, 4–6, 6–4	(United States) Lori McNeil* (Australia) Rennae Stubbs*	(United States) Gigi Fernández (Commonwealth of Independent States) Natasha Zvereva	3–6, 7–5, 7–5

== See also ==
- WTA Tier I events
- 1992 WTA Tour
- 1992 ATP Championship Series, Single Week
- 1992 ATP Tour
