= 1992 ATP Championship Series, Single Week =

Men's professional tennis tour

Details
- Duration: March 2 – November 8
- Edition: 3rd
- Tournaments: 9

Achievements (singles)
- Most titles: (United States) Michael Chang (2)
- Most finals: (United States) Michael Chang (France) Guy Forget (United States) Ivan Lendl (2)

The 1992 ATP Championship Series, Single Week was a series of tennis tournament that was part of the 1992 ATP Tour, the elite tour for professional men's tennis organised by the Association of Tennis Professionals. It formed the tier below the Grand Slam tournaments.

== Results ==
* First-time champion

Masters	Singles champions	Runners-up	Score	Doubles champions	Runners-up	Score
Indian Wells Singles – Doubles	(United States) Michael Chang	(Commonwealth of Independent States) Andrei Chesnokov	6–3, 6–4, 7–5	(United States) Steve DeVries* (Australia) David Macpherson*	(United States) Kent Kinnear (United States) Sven Salumaa	6–3, 2–6, 6–4
Miami Singles – Doubles	(United States) Michael Chang	(Argentina) Alberto Mancini	7–5, 7–5	(United States) Ken Flach (United States) Todd Witsken	(United States) Kent Kinnear (United States) Sven Salumaa	6–4, 6–3
Monte Carlo Singles – Doubles	(Austria) Thomas Muster	(United States) Aaron Krickstein	6–3, 6–1, 6–3	(Germany) Boris Becker	(Czechoslovakia) Petr Korda (Czechoslovakia) Karel Nováček	3–6, 6–1, 6–4
Monte Carlo Singles – Doubles	(Austria) Thomas Muster	(United States) Aaron Krickstein	6–3, 6–1, 6–3	(Germany) Michael Stich*	(Czechoslovakia) Petr Korda (Czechoslovakia) Karel Nováček	3–6, 6–1, 6–4
Hamburg Singles – Doubles	(Sweden) Stefan Edberg	(Germany) Michael Stich	5–7, 6–4, 6–1	(Spain) Sergio Casal (Spain) Emilio Sánchez	(Germany) Carl-Uwe Steeb (Germany) Michael Stich	6–3, 3–6, 6–4
Rome Singles – Doubles	(United States) Jim Courier	(Spain) Carlos Costa	7–6^{(7–3)}, 6–0, 6–4	(Switzerland) Jakob Hlasek	(South Africa) Wayne Ferreira (Australia) Mark Kratzmann	6–4, 3–6, 6–1
Rome Singles – Doubles	(United States) Jim Courier	(Spain) Carlos Costa	7–6^{(7–3)}, 6–0, 6–4	(Switzerland) Marc Rosset*	(South Africa) Wayne Ferreira (Australia) Mark Kratzmann	6–4, 3–6, 6–1
Toronto Singles – Doubles	(United States) Andre Agassi	(United States) Ivan Lendl	3–6, 6–2, 6–0	(South Africa) Danie Visser*	(United States) Andre Agassi (United States) John McEnroe	6–4, 6–4
Toronto Singles – Doubles	(United States) Andre Agassi	(United States) Ivan Lendl	3–6, 6–2, 6–0	(United States) Patrick Galbraith	(United States) Andre Agassi (United States) John McEnroe	6–4, 6–4
Cincinnati Singles – Doubles	(United States) Pete Sampras*	(United States) Ivan Lendl	6–3, 3–6, 6–3	(Australia) Todd Woodbridge* (Australia) Mark Woodforde*	(United States) Patrick McEnroe (United States) Jonathan Stark	7–6, 6–4
Stockholm Singles – Doubles	(Croatia) Goran Ivanišević*	(France) Guy Forget	7–6^{(7–2)}, 4–6, 7–6^{(7–5)}, 6–2	(Australia) Mark Woodforde (Australia) Todd Woodbridge	(United States) Steve DeVries (Australia) David Macpherson	6–4, 6–4
Paris Singles – Doubles	(Germany) Boris Becker	(France) Guy Forget	7–6^{(7–3)}, 6–3, 3–6, 6–3	(United States) John McEnroe* (United States) Patrick McEnroe*	(United States) Patrick Galbraith (South Africa) Danie Visser	7–6, 6–3

== Tournament details ==
Key

- Q = Qualifier
- WC = Wild card
- LL = Lucky loser
- Alt = Alternate
- ITF = ITF entry
- PR = Protected ranking
- SR = Special ranking
- SE = Special exempt
- JE = Junior exempt
- JR = Junior Accelerator Programme entrant
- CO = College Accelerator Programme entrant
- NG = Next Gen Accelerator Program entrant
- w/o = Walkover
- r = Retired
- d = Defaulted

=== Indian Wells ===
Tournament name	Newsweek Champions Cup
Dates	March 2–8
Surface	Hard (outdoors)
Location	Indian Wells, California, United States

==== Singles ====
Quarterfinals
(Commonwealth of Independent States) Andrei Chesnokov	7	7
7	(Spain) Emilio Sánchez	5	5
3	(Germany) Michael Stich	6	6
11	(Spain) Sergi Bruguera	1	2
12	(United States) Michael Chang	6	6
(Commonwealth of Independent States) Andrei Cherkasov	4	2
(Spain) Francisco Clavet	6	6
16	(Switzerland) Jakob Hlasek	1	2

Semifinals
(Commonwealth of Independent States) Andrei Chesnokov	1	7^{7}	6
3	(Germany) Michael Stich	6	6^{4}	3
12	(United States) Michael Chang	6	6
(Spain) Francisco Clavet	0	1

Final
(Commonwealth of Independent States) Andrei Chesnokov	3	4	5
12	(United States) Michael Chang	6	6	7

==== Doubles ====
Semifinals
(United States) Jim Pugh (Australia) Jason Stoltenberg	4	1
(United States) Kent Kinnear (United States) Sven Salumaa	6	6
(United States) Steve DeVries (Australia) David Macpherson	7	6
(United States) Richey Reneberg (United States) David Wheaton	5	3

Final
(United States) Kent Kinnear (United States) Sven Salumaa	6	3	3
(United States) Steve DeVries (Australia) David Macpherson	4	6	6

=== Key Biscayne ===
Tournament name	Lipton International Players Championships
Dates	March 13 – 22
Surface	Hard (outdoors)
Location	Key Biscayne, Florida, United States

==== Singles ====
Quarterfinals
1	(United States) Jim Courier	6^{8}	6	6
(Italy) Diego Nargiso	7^{10}	2	0
4	(United States) Pete Sampras	4	6^{4}
6	(United States) Michael Chang	6	7^{7}
22	(Netherlands) Richard Krajicek	4	7^{8}	5
20	(Argentina) Alberto Mancini	6	6^{6}	7
25	(Commonwealth of Independent States) Andrei Cherkasov	7^{7}	3	4
17	(Switzerland) Jakob Hlasek	6^{1}	6	6

Semifinals
1	(United States) Jim Courier	2	4
6	(United States) Michael Chang	6	6
20	(Argentina) Alberto Mancini	7^{7}	7
17	(Switzerland) Jakob Hlasek	6^{4}	5

Finals
6	(United States) Michael Chang	7	7
20	(Argentina) Alberto Mancini	5	5

==== Doubles ====
Semifinals
16	(Sweden) Ronnie Båthman (Sweden) Rikard Bergh	4	5
14	(United States) Kent Kinnear (United States) Sven Salumaa	6	7
3	(United States) Ken Flach (United States) Todd Witsken	3	7	7
7	(South Africa) Wayne Ferreira (South Africa) Piet Norval	6	5	6

Final
14	(United States) Kent Kinnear (United States) Sven Salumaa	4	3
3	(United States) Ken Flach (United States) Todd Witsken	6	6

=== Monte Carlo ===
Tournament name	Volvo Monte-Carlo Open
Dates	April 20 – 26
Surface	Clay (outdoors)
Location	Roquebrune-Cap-Martin, France

==== Singles ====
Quarterfinals
16	(United States) Aaron Krickstein	6	7^{7}
(Commonwealth of Independent States) Andrei Chesnokov	1	6^{1}
WC/3	(Germany) Michael Stich	6^{5}	6	5
(Croatia) Goran Prpić	7^{7}	4	7
Q	(Sweden) Mikael Tillström	3	6	3
(Austria) Thomas Muster	6	4	6
(France) Arnaud Boetsch	1	6	6
(Germany) Carl-Uwe Steeb	6	2	0

Semifinals
16	(United States) Aaron Krickstein	6	6
(Croatia) Goran Prpić	1	1
(Austria) Thomas Muster	7	6
(France) Arnaud Boetsch	5	4

Finals
16	(United States) Aaron Krickstein	3	1	3
(Austria) Thomas Muster	6	6	6

==== Doubles ====
Semifinals
1	(United States) Luke Jensen (Australia) Laurie Warder	2	3
(Czechoslovakia) Petr Korda (Czechoslovakia) Karel Nováček	6	6
(Germany) Boris Becker (Germany) Michael Stich	6	7
2	(Netherlands) Tom Nijssen (Czechoslovakia) Cyril Suk	3	6

Final
(Czechoslovakia) Petr Korda (Czechoslovakia) Karel Nováček	4	4
(Germany) Boris Becker (Germany) Michael Stich	6	6

=== Hamburg ===
Tournament name	ATP German Open
Dates	May 4 – 10
Surface	Clay (outdoors)
Location	Hamburg, Germany

==== Singles ====
Quarterfinals
1	(Sweden) Stefan Edberg	2	7^{7}	6
(Italy) Omar Camporese	6	6^{5}	2
(Netherlands) Paul Haarhuis	6	4	3
(Spain) Carlos Costa	4	6	6
12	(Netherlands) Richard Krajicek	4	6	3
3	(Germany) Michael Stich	6	3	6
(Czechoslovakia) Karel Nováček	1	6^{6}
WC/2	(Germany) Boris Becker	6	7^{8}

Semifinals
1	(Sweden) Stefan Edberg	7	7^{9}
(Spain) Carlos Costa	5	6^{7}
3	(Germany) Michael Stich	6	6
WC/2	(Germany) Boris Becker	1	1

Finals
1	(Sweden) Stefan Edberg	5	6	6
3	(Germany) Michael Stich	7	4	1

==== Doubles ====
Semifinals
Q	(Croatia) Goran Prpić (Commonwealth of Independent States) Dimitri Poliakov	4	2
5	(Spain) Sergio Casal (Spain) Emilio Sánchez	6	6
3	(Netherlands) Tom Nijssen (Czechoslovakia) Cyril Suk	2	6
(Germany) Carl-Uwe Steeb (Germany) Michael Stich	6	7

Final
5	(Spain) Sergio Casal (Spain) Emilio Sánchez	5	6	6
(Germany) Carl-Uwe Steeb (Germany) Michael Stich	7	4	3

=== Rome ===
Tournament name	Italian Open
Dates	May 11 – 17
Surface	Clay (outdoors)
Location	Rome, Italy

==== Singles ====
Quarterfinals
1	(United States) Jim Courier	4	6	6
(Argentina) Christian Miniussi	6	4	1
(Germany) Carl-Uwe Steeb	6	3	6
5	(United States) Michael Chang	4	6	1
(Peru) Jaime Yzaga	4	0
(Spain) Carlos Costa	6	6
8	(Czechoslovakia) Petr Korda	1	7^{7}	6
2	(United States) Pete Sampras	6	6^{4}	3

Semifinals
1	(United States) Jim Courier	5	6	6
(Germany) Carl-Uwe Steeb	7	1	2
(Spain) Carlos Costa	6	6
8	(Czechoslovakia) Petr Korda	4	3

Finals
1	(United States) Jim Courier	7^{7}	6	6
(Spain) Carlos Costa	6^{3}	0	4

==== Doubles ====
Semifinals
8	(South Africa) Wayne Ferreira (Australia) Mark Kratzmann	6	7	6
(United States) Brad Pearce (South Africa) Byron Talbot	7	5	2
(Switzerland) Jakob Hlasek (Switzerland) Marc Rosset	6	7
7	(Italy) Omar Camporese (Croatia) Goran Ivanišević	2	5

Final
8	(South Africa) Wayne Ferreira (Australia) Mark Kratzmann	4	6	1
(Switzerland) Jakob Hlasek (Switzerland) Marc Rosset	6	3	6

=== Toronto ===
Tournament name	Player's International
Dates	July 20 – 26
Surface	Hard (outdoors)
Location	Toronto, Ontario, Canada

==== Singles ====
Quarterfinals
1	(Czechoslovakia) Petr Korda	6^{3}	6	3
10	(Australia) Wally Masur	7^{7}	4	6
3	(United States) Ivan Lendl	6	6
5	(United States) John McEnroe	2	4
6	(United States) M Washington	7^{7}	6
4	(United States) Aaron Krickstein	6^{5}	1
8	(Israel) Amos Mansdorf	2	4
2	(United States) Andre Agassi	6	6

Semifinals
10	(Australia) Wally Masur	1	2
3	(United States) Ivan Lendl	6	6
6	(United States) MaliVai Washington	6	2	1
2	(United States) Andre Agassi	2	6	6

Finals
3	(United States) Ivan Lendl	6	2	0
2	(United States) Andre Agassi	3	6	6

==== Doubles ====
Semifinals
8	(United States) Patrick Galbraith (South Africa) Danie Visser	6	6
4	(Australia) Mark Kratzmann (Australia) Wally Masur	3	4
(United States) Andre Agassi (United States) John McEnroe	4	7	6
2	(United States) Kelly Jones (United States) Rick Leach	6	6	4

Final
8	(United States) Patrick Galbraith (South Africa) Danie Visser	6	6
(United States) Andre Agassi (United States) John McEnroe	4	4

=== Cincinnati ===
Tournament name	Thriftway ATP Championships
Dates	August 10 – 16
Surface	Hard (outdoors)
Location	Mason, Ohio, United States

==== Singles ====
Quarterfinals
(United States) David Wheaton	1	2
8	(United States) Ivan Lendl	6	6
4	(United States) Michael Chang	6	6
(Peru) Jaime Yzaga	3	1
5	(Czechoslovakia) Petr Korda	3	3
3	(United States) Pete Sampras	6	6
(United States) Jim Grabb	3	6^{5}
2	(Sweden) Stefan Edberg	6	7^{7}

Semifinals
8	(United States) Ivan Lendl	6	6
4	(United States) Michael Chang	3	2
3	(United States) Pete Sampras	6	6
2	(Sweden) Stefan Edberg	2	3

Final
8	(United States) Ivan Lendl	3	6	3
3	(United States) Pete Sampras	6	3	6

==== Doubles ====
Semifinals
(France) Guy Forget (Switzerland) Jakob Hlasek	6	6	2
(United States) Patrick McEnroe (United States) Jonathan Stark	4	7	6
(United States) Mike Briggs (United States) Trevor Kronemann	2	4
2	(Australia) Todd Woodbridge (Australia) Mark Woodforde	6	6

Final
(United States) Patrick McEnroe (United States) Jonathan Stark	3	6	3
2	(Australia) Todd Woodbridge (Australia) Mark Woodforde	6	1	6

=== Stockholm ===
Tournament name	Stockholm Open
Dates	October 26 – November 1
Surface	Carpet (indoors)
Location	Stockholm, Sweden

==== Singles ====
Quarterfinals
16	(Sweden) Henrik Holm	5	7^{8}	6^{2}
8	(France) Guy Forget	7	6^{6}	7^{7}
3	(United States) Pete Sampras	7^{7}	5	6
5	(Czechoslovakia) Petr Korda	6^{4}	7	3
6	(Germany) Boris Becker	5	4
4	(Croatia) Goran Ivanišević	7	6
(France) Arnaud Boetsch	5	6^{5}
2	(Sweden) Stefan Edberg	7	7^{7}

Semifinals
8	(France) Guy Forget	7^{13}	7^{7}
3	(United States) Pete Sampras	6^{11}	6^{4}
4	(Croatia) Goran Ivanišević	6	7^{10}
2	(Sweden) Stefan Edberg	4	6^{8}

Final
8	(France) Guy Forget	6^{2}	6	6^{5}	2
4	(Croatia) Goran Ivanišević	7^{7}	4	7^{7}	6

==== Doubles ====
Semifinals
1	(Australia) Todd Woodbridge (Australia) Mark Woodforde	6	6	6
3	(Australia) John Fitzgerald (Sweden) Anders Järryd	7	2	4
(Canada) Grant Connell (Canada) Glenn Michibata	6	3	4
7	(United States) Steve DeVries (Australia) David Macpherson	4	6	6

Final
1	(Australia) Todd Woodbridge (Australia) Mark Woodforde	6	6
7	(United States) Steve DeVries (Australia) David Macpherson	3	4

=== Paris ===
Tournament name	Paris Open
Dates	November 2 – 8
Surface	Carpet (indoors)
Location	Paris, France

==== Singles ====
Quarterfinals
1	(United States) Jim Courier	6^{5}	3
9	(Germany) Boris Becker	7^{7}	6
(United States) David Wheaton	4	3
6	(Croatia) Goran Ivanišević	6	6
11	(France) Guy Forget	6^{5}	7^{7}	6
3	(Sweden) Stefan Edberg	7^{7}	6^{3}	3
(Switzerland) Jakob Hlasek
WC	(France) Henri Leconte	w/o

Semifinals
9	(Germany) Boris Becker	6	6
6	(Croatia) Goran Ivanišević	1	2
11	(France) Guy Forget	6	7^{7}
(Switzerland) Jakob Hlasek	3	6^{1}

Final
9	(Germany) Boris Becker	7^{7}	6	3	6
11	(France) Guy Forget	6^{3}	3	6	3

==== Doubles ====
Semifinals
1	(United States) Jim Grabb (United States) Richey Reneberg	3	6
6	(United States) John McEnroe (United States) Patrick McEnroe	6	7
5	(Australia) John Fitzgerald (Sweden) Anders Järryd	3	6
(United States) Patrick Galbraith (South Africa) Danie Visser	6	7

Final
6	(United States) John McEnroe (United States) Patrick McEnroe	6	6
(United States) Patrick Galbraith (South Africa) Danie Visser	4	2

== Titles won by player ==
=== Singles ===
#	Player	IN	MI	MO	HA	RO	CA	CI	ST	PA	#	Winning span
1	(Sweden) Stefan Edberg	1	-	-	1	-	-	1	-	1	4	1990–1992 (3)
2	(United States) Michael Chang	1	1	-	-	-	1	-	-	-	3	1990–1992 (3)
=	(United States) Jim Courier	1	1	-	-	1	-	-	-	-	3	1991–1992 (2)
=	(Germany) Boris Becker	-	-	-	-	-	-	-	2	1	3	1990–1992 (3)
5	(Commonwealth of Independent States) Andrei Chesnokov	-	-	1	-	-	1	-	-	-	2	1990–1991 (2)
=	(France) Guy Forget	-	-	-	-	-	-	1	-	1	2	1991
=	(Austria) Thomas Muster	-	-	1	-	1	-	-	-	-	2	1990–1992 (3)
=	(United States) Andre Agassi	-	1	-	-	-	1	-	-	-	2	1990–1992 (3)
9	(Spain) Juan Aguilera	-	-	-	1	-	-	-	-	-	1	1990
=	(Spain) Sergi Bruguera	-	-	1	-	-	-	-	-	-	1	1991
=	(Croatia) Goran Ivanišević	-	-	-	-	-	-	-	1	-	1	1992
=	(Czechoslovakia) Karel Nováček	-	-	-	1	-	-	-	-	-	1	1991
=	(Spain) Emilio Sánchez	-	-	-	-	1	-	-	-	-	1	1991
=	(United States) Pete Sampras	-	-	-	-	-	-	1	-	-	1	1992

== See also ==
- ATP Tour Masters 1000
- 1992 ATP Tour
- 1992 WTA Tier I Series
- 1992 WTA Tour
