= 1991 Lufthansa Cup German Open – Doubles =

Doubles
- 1991 Lufthansa Cup German Open

Final
- Champions: (Soviet Union) Larisa Neiland (Soviet Union) Natasha Zvereva
- Runners-up: (Australia) Nicole Provis (South Africa) Elna Reinach
- Score: 6–3, 6–3

Details
- Draw: 28 (1 Q)
- Seeds: 8

Events
Singles	Doubles
- WTA German Open

Larisa Neiland and Natasha Zvereva were the defending champions, but lost in the final to Nicole Provis and Elna Reinach, 6–3, 6–3.

== Seeds ==
The top four seeds received a bye to the second round.

1. (United States) Gigi Fernández / (Czechoslovakia) Jana Novotná (semifinal)
2. (Spain) Arantxa Sánchez Vicario / (Czechoslovakia) Helena Suková (semifinal)
3. (Soviet Union) Larisa Savchenko / (Soviet Union) Natalia Zvereva (champion)
4. (Australia) Nicole Provis / (South Africa) Elna Reinach (final)
5. (South Africa) Rosalyn Fairbank-Nideffer / (Argentina) Mercedes Paz (second round)
6. (West Germany) Claudia Kohde-Kilsch / (Austria) Judith Wiesner (quarterfinal)
7. (United States) Jennifer Capriati / (United States) Mary Joe Fernández (quarterfinal)
8. (Italy) Sandra Cecchini / (Italy) Laura Garrone (quarterfinal)

== Draw ==
Key

- Q = Qualifier
- WC = Wild card
- LL = Lucky loser
- Alt = Alternate
- ITF = ITF entry
- PR = Protected ranking
- SR = Special ranking
- SE = Special exempt
- JE = Junior exempt
- JR = Junior Accelerator Programme entrant
- CO = College Accelerator Programme entrant
- NG = Next Gen Accelerator Program entrant
- w/o = Walkover
- r = Retired
- d = Defaulted

=== Finals ===
Semifinals
1	(United States) Gigi Fernández (Czechoslovakia) Jana Novotná	5	6
3	(Soviet Union) Larisa Savchenko (Soviet Union) Natalia Zvereva	7	7
4	(Australia) Nicole Provis (South Africa) Elna Reinach	6	3	7
2	(Spain) Arantxa Sánchez Vicario (Czechoslovakia) Helena Suková	4	6	5

Final
3	(Soviet Union) Larisa Savchenko (Soviet Union) Natalia Zvereva	6	6
4	(Australia) Nicole Provis (South Africa) Elna Reinach	3	3

=== Top half ===
First round
(Australia) M Jaggard (United Kingdom) C Wood	2	6	6
(Australia) R McQuillan (Czechoslovakia) E Švíglerová	6	3	3
(Peru) L Gildemeister (Denmark) T Scheuer-Larsen	6	7
(United States) A Grossman (Australia) T Morton	2	6
(West Germany) C Schneider (Czechoslovakia) D Szabová	0	6
8	(Italy) S Cecchini (Italy) L Garrone	6	7
(Soviet Union) L Meskhi (Czechoslovakia) R Rajchrtová	7	5	7
(United Kingdom) J Durie (West Germany) A Huber	6	7	6
(United States) C Benjamin (France) J Halard	2	6	6
(West Germany) S Meier (West Germany) E Pfaff	6	4	3
(Netherlands) I Driehuis (Australia) A Scott	4	3
5	(South Africa) R Fairbank-Nideffer (Argentina) M Paz	6	6

Second round
1	(United States) G Fernández (Czechoslovakia) J Novotná	6	6
(Australia) M Jaggard (United Kingdom) C Wood	4	1
(Peru) L Gildemeister (Denmark) T Scheuer-Larsen
8	(Italy) S Cecchini (Italy) L Garrone	w/o
3	(Soviet Union) L Savchenko (Soviet Union) N Zvereva	6	4	4
(Soviet Union) L Meskhi (Czechoslovakia) R Rajchrtová	4	6	6
(United States) C Benjamin (France) J Halard	6	6
5	(South Africa) R Fairbank-Nideffer (Argentina) M Paz	4	2

Quarterfinals
1	(United States) G Fernández (Czechoslovakia) J Novotná	6	6
8	(Italy) S Cecchini (Italy) L Garrone	4	1
3	(Soviet Union) L Savchenko (Soviet Union) N Zvereva	6	4	7
(United States) C Benjamin (France) J Halard	2	6	6

Semifinals
1	(United States) Gigi Fernández (Czechoslovakia) Jana Novotná	5	6
3	(Soviet Union) Larisa Savchenko (Soviet Union) Natalia Zvereva	7	7

=== Bottom half ===
First round
6	(West Germany) C Kohde-Kilsch (Austria) J Wiesner	6	6
(United States) J Fuchs (United States) J Smoller	2	3
(Netherlands) C Bakkum (Netherlands) N Jagerman	2	4
(Australia) L Field (Sweden) M Strandlund	6	6
(Soviet Union) E Brioukhovets (Argentina) F Labat	3	4
(West Germany) M Babel (West Germany) B Rittner	6	6
7	(United States) J Capriati (United States) M Joe Fernández	6	6
(Poland) R Baranski (Argentina) B Fulco	1	2
Q	(United States) E De Lone (United States) A Keller	0	6	6
(Bulgaria) K Maleeva (Bulgaria) M Maleeva	6	4	0
(Czechoslovakia) P Langrová (Czechoslovakia) R Zrubáková	w/o
(West Germany) C Porwik (United States) S Rehe

Second round
6	(West Germany) C Kohde-Kilsch (Austria) J Wiesner	6	6
(Australia) L Field (Sweden) M Strandlund	3	2
(West Germany) M Babel (West Germany) B Rittner	5	1
4	(Australia) N Provis (South Africa) E Reinach	7	6
7	(United States) J Capriati (United States) M Joe Fernández	7	5	6
Q	(United States) E De Lone (United States) A Keller	5	7	0
(Czechoslovakia) P Langrová (Czechoslovakia) R Zrubáková	2	6	1
2	(Spain) A Sánchez Vicario (Czechoslovakia) H Suková	6	1	6

Quarterfinals
6	(West Germany) C Kohde-Kilsch (Austria) J Wiesner	6	2	3
4	(Australia) N Provis (South Africa) E Reinach	3	6	6
7	(United States) J Capriati (United States) M Joe Fernández	3	1
2	(Spain) A Sánchez Vicario (Czechoslovakia) H Suková	6	6

Semifinals
4	(Australia) Nicole Provis (South Africa) Elna Reinach	6	3	7
2	(Spain) Arantxa Sánchez Vicario (Czechoslovakia) Helena Suková	4	6	5
