= 1991 Lufthansa Cup German Open =

- Date: 13–20 May
- Edition: 80th
- Category: Tier I
- Draw: 56S / 28D
- Prize money: $500,000
- Surface: Clay / outdoor
- Location: Berlin, Germany
- Venue: Rot-Weiss Tennis Club

Champions

Singles
- (Germany) Steffi Graf

Doubles
- (Soviet Union) Larisa Neiland / (Soviet Union) Natasha Zvereva
- WTA German Open

The 1991 Lufthansa Cup German Open was a women's tennis tournament played on outdoor clay courts at the Rot-Weiss Tennis Club in Berlin, Germany for the first time ever after German reunification along with the former East Berlin which was reunited with the former West Berlin and that was part of the Tier I category of the 1991 WTA Tour. It was the 80th edition of the tournament and was held from 13 May until 20 May 1991. First-seeded Steffi Graf won the singles title, her fifth at the event.

== Finals ==
=== Singles ===
(Germany) Steffi Graf defeated (Spain) Arantxa Sánchez Vicario 6–3, 4–6, 7–6^{(8–6)}

- It was Graf's 3rd singles title of the year and the 57th of her career.

=== Doubles ===
(Soviet Union) Larisa Neiland / (Soviet Union) Natasha Zvereva defeated (Australia) Nicole Provis / (South Africa) Elna Reinach 6–3, 6–3

== Prize money ==
Event	W	F	SF	QF	Round of 16	Round of 32	Round of 64
Singles	$100,000	$40,000	$20,000	$10,000	$5,175	$2,750	$1,500
