= 1991 Lufthansa Cup German Open – Singles =

Singles
- 1991 Lufthansa Cup German Open

Final
- Champion: (Germany) Steffi Graf
- Runner-up: (Spain) Arantxa Sánchez Vicario
- Score: 6–3, 4–6, 7–6^{(8–6)}

Details
- Draw: 56 (8 Q)
- Seeds: 16

Events
Singles	Doubles
← 1990 ·	WTA German Open	· 1992 →

Steffi Graf defeated Arantxa Sánchez Vicario in the final, 6–3, 4–6, 7–6^{(8–6)} to win the singles tennis title at the 1991 WTA German Open.

Monica Seles was the reigning champion, but chose not to participate.

== Seeds ==
The top eight seeds received a bye to the second round.

1. (West Germany) Steffi Graf (champion)
2. (Argentina) Gabriela Sabatini (third round)
3. (United States) Mary Joe Fernández (third round)
4. (Czechoslovakia) Jana Novotná (semifinal)
5. (Spain) Arantxa Sánchez Vicario (final)
6. (Bulgaria) Katerina Maleeva (second round)
7. (United States) Jennifer Capriati (semifinal)
8. (Czechoslovakia) Helena Suková (third round)
9. (Soviet Union) Leila Meskhi (first round)
10. (France) Nathalie Tauziat (first round)
11. (Soviet Union) Natalia Zvereva (third round)
12. (Italy) Sandra Cecchini (third round)
13. (Austria) Judith Wiesner (first round)
14. (Germany) Anke Huber (quarterfinal)
15. (Peru) Laura Gildemeister (second round)
16. (Argentina) Mercedes Paz (second round)

== Draw ==
=== Key ===
- Q = Qualifier
- WC = Wild card
- LL = Lucky loser
- Alt = Alternate
- SE = Special exempt
- PR = Protected ranking
- ITF = ITF entry
- JE = Junior exempt
- w/o = Walkover
- r = Retired
- d = Defaulted
- SR = Special ranking

=== Finals ===
Quarterfinals
1	(West Germany) Steffi Graf	6	6
(Czechoslovakia) Radomira Zrubáková	3	2
4	(Czechoslovakia) Jana Novotná	6	6
(United States) Ginger Helgeson	1	2
7	(United States) Jennifer Capriati	6	6
(France) Julie Halard	3	2
5	(Spain) Arantxa Sánchez Vicario	6	6
14	(Germany) Anke Huber	0	2

Semifinals
1	(West Germany) Steffi Graf	6	6
4	(Czechoslovakia) Jana Novotná	1	0
7	(United States) Jennifer Capriati	5	7	4
5	(Spain) Arantxa Sánchez Vicario	7	5	6

Final
1	(West Germany) Steffi Graf	6	4	7
5	(Spain) Arantxa Sánchez Vicario	3	6	6

=== Top half ===
==== Section 1 ====
First round
(Luxembourg) K Kschwendt	5	0^{r}
Q	(Netherlands) N Jagerman	7	1
(Soviet Union) E Brioukhovets	6	2	7
(United States) S Rehe	3	6	6
(Bulgaria) M Maleeva	6	6
13	(Austria) J Wiesner	0	3
9	(Soviet Union) L Meskhi	2	2
(Czechoslovakia) R Zrubáková	6	6
(United States) H Cioffi	6	6
(Germany) K Düll	2	1
Q	(South Africa) A Coetzer	6	6
(West Germany) V Martinek	3	3

Second round
1	(West Germany) S Graf	6	6
Q	(Netherlands) N Jagerman	2	3
(Soviet Union) E Brioukhovets	2	6	6
(Bulgaria) M Maleeva	6	2	3
(Czechoslovakia) R Zrubáková	2	6	6
(United States) H Cioffi	6	4	1
Q	(South Africa) A Coetzer	6	7
6	(Bulgaria) K Maleeva	2	6

Third round
1	(West Germany) S Graf	6	6
(Soviet Union) E Brioukhovets	0	1
(Czechoslovakia) R Zrubáková	7	0	6
Q	(South Africa) A Coetzer	6	6	1

Quarterfinals
1	(West Germany) Steffi Graf	6	6
(Czechoslovakia) Radomira Zrubáková	3	2

==== Section 2 ====
First round
Q	(Germany) A Popp	1	6
(Australia) R McQuillan	6	7
(Sweden) C Dahlman	1	1
(United States) A Grossman	6	6
Q	(West Germany) S Meier	2	0
12	(Italy) S Cecchini	6	6
16	(Argentina) M Paz	6	6
(Czechoslovakia) E Švíglerová	4	4
(Soviet Union) L Savchenko	3	0
(United States) G Helgeson	6	6
(West Germany) I Cueto	1	4
(Argentina) F Labat	6	6

Second round
4	(Czechoslovakia) J Novotná	6	6
(Australia) R McQuillan	4	4
(United States) A Grossman	2	2
12	(Italy) S Cecchini	6	6
16	(Argentina) M Paz	6	3
(United States) G Helgeson	7	6
(Argentina) F Labat	3	6	1
8	(Czechoslovakia) H Suková	6	2	6

Third round
4	(Czechoslovakia) J Novotná	6	3	6
12	(Italy) S Cecchini	3	6	3
(United States) G Helgeson	6	6
8	(Czechoslovakia) H Suková	4	3

Quarterfinals
4	(Czechoslovakia) Jana Novotná	6	6
(United States) Ginger Helgeson	1	2

=== Bottom half ===
==== Section 1 ====
First round
Q	(United States) S Martin	6	6
(United States) K Rinaldi	2	3
(Austria) P Ritter	3	6
(West Germany) W Probst	6	7
(West Germany) C Kohde-Kilsch	1	2
11	(Soviet Union) N Zvereva	6	6
10	(France) N Tauziat	1	0
(France) J Halard	6	6
(Italy) F Bonsignori	2	7	5
Q	(Argentina) B Fulco	6	6	1^{r}
(West Germany) B Rittner	6	7
(Czechoslovakia) R Rajchrtová	1	6

Second round
7	(United States) J Capriati	6	6
Q	(United States) S Martin	2	4
(West Germany) W Probst	5	5
11	(Soviet Union) N Zvereva	7	7
(France) J Halard	6	6
(Italy) F Bonsignori	1	0
(West Germany) B Rittner	4	7	2
3	(United States) M Joe Fernández	6	6	6

Third round
7	(United States) J Capriati	6	6
11	(Soviet Union) N Zvereva	1	1
(France) J Halard	7	6
3	(United States) M Joe Fernández	5	3

Quarterfinals
7	(United States) Jennifer Capriati	6	6
(France) Julie Halard	3	2

==== Section 2 ====
First round
Q	(Japan) A Kijimuta	6	6
(United Kingdom) J Durie	3	2
(Germany) M Kochta	4	6	6
(Australia) N Provis	6	1	7
Q	(Italy) F Romano	3	1
15	(Peru) L Gildemeister	6	6
14	(Germany) A Huber	6	6
(Czechoslovakia) P Langrová	4	0
(Italy) L Garrone	7	6
(Italy) K Piccolini	6	1
(South Africa) R Fairbank-Nideffer	3	0
(Japan) N Sawamatsu	6	6

Second round
5	(Spain) A Sánchez Vicario	6	6
Q	(Japan) A Kijimuta	2	0
(Australia) N Provis	6	7
15	(Peru) L Gildemeister	2	6
14	(Germany) A Huber	6	6
(Italy) L Garrone	3	1
(Japan) N Sawamatsu	1	0
2	(Argentina) G Sabatini	6	6

Third round
5	(Spain) A Sánchez Vicario	6	6
(Australia) N Provis	1	1
14	(Germany) A Huber	7	6
2	(Argentina) G Sabatini	5	3

Quarterfinals
5	(Spain) Arantxa Sánchez Vicario	6	6
14	(Germany) Anke Huber	0	2
