= 1992 Lufthansa Cup – Singles =

Singles
- 1992 Lufthansa Cup

Final
- Champion: (Germany) Steffi Graf
- Runner-up: (Spain) Arantxa Sánchez Vicario
- Score: 4–6, 7–5, 6–2

Details
- Draw: 56 (8 Q / 2 WC)
- Seeds: 16

Events
Singles	Doubles
← 1991 ·	Lufthansa Cup	· 1993 →

Steffi Graf was the defending champion and successfully defended her title, defeating Arantxa Sánchez Vicario in the final, 4–6, 7–5, 6–2.

== Seeds ==
The top eight seeds received a bye to the second round.

1. (Germany) Steffi Graf (champion)
2. (Spain) Arantxa Sánchez Vicario (final)
3. (United States) Jennifer Capriati (semifinal)
4. (United States) Mary Joe Fernández (semifinal)
5. (Germany) Anke Huber (second round)
6. (Czechoslovakia) Jana Novotná (third round)
7. (Bulgaria) Katerina Maleeva (third round)
8. (France) Nathalie Tauziat (third round)
9. (Czechoslovakia) Helena Suková (third round)
10. (Belgium) Sabine Appelmans (quarterfinal)
11. (France) Julie Halard (quarterfinal)
12. (Peru) Laura Gildemeister (third round)
13. (Austria) Judith Wiesner (third round)
14. (Czechoslovakia) Radomira Zrubáková (quarterfinal)
15. (Germany) Barbara Rittner (third round)
16. (Commonwealth of Independent States) Natalia Zvereva (third round)

== Draw ==
=== Key ===
- Q = Qualifier
- WC = Wild card
- LL = Lucky loser
- Alt = Alternate
- SE = Special exempt
- PR = Protected ranking
- ITF = ITF entry
- JE = Junior exempt
- w/o = Walkover
- r = Retired
- d = Defaulted
- SR = Special ranking

=== Finals ===
Quarterfinals
1	(Germany) Steffi Graf	6	6
11	(France) Julie Halard	1	2
3	(United States) Jennifer Capriati	6	7
14	(Czechoslovakia) Radomira Zrubáková	3	5
(Italy) Sandra Cecchini	1	6
4	(United States) Mary Joe Fernández	6	7
10	(Belgium) Sabine Appelmans	0	3
2	(Spain) Arantxa Sánchez Vicario	6	6

Semifinals
1	(Germany) Steffi Graf	2	6	6
3	(United States) Jennifer Capriati	6	3	4
4	(United States) Mary Joe Fernández	5	6
2	(Spain) Arantxa Sánchez Vicario	7	7

Final
1	(Germany) Steffi Graf	4	7	6
2	(Spain) Arantxa Sánchez Vicario	6	5	2

=== Top half ===
==== Section 1 ====
First round
(Argentina) M Paz	6	6
(Argentina) C Tessi	4	0
(France) N van Lottum	6	6
(Germany) S Hack	3	3
(Germany) V Martinek	6	5	3
9	(Czechoslovakia) H Suková	4	7	6
11	(France) J Halard	6	3	6
(Italy) S Farina	4	6	1
(Germany) W Probst	6	7
(Italy) F Bonsignori	4	5
(Australia) R Stubbs	1	6	6
(Germany) S Frankl	6	2	3

Second round
1	(Germany) S Graf	6	6
(Argentina) M Paz	2	4
(France) N van Lottum	1	4
9	(Czechoslovakia) H Suková	6	6
11	(France) J Halard	6	6
(Germany) W Probst	2	3
(Germany) S Frankl	0	1
7	(Bulgaria) K Maleeva	6	6

Third round
1	(Germany) S Graf	6	3	6
9	(Czechoslovakia) H Suková	3	6	2
11	(France) J Halard	6	6
7	(Bulgaria) K Maleeva	2	3

Quarterfinals
1	(Germany) Steffi Graf	6	6
11	(France) Julie Halard	1	2

==== Section 2 ====
First round
WC	(Germany) S Meier	4	6	6
(Germany) M Kochta	6	3	3
(Italy) K Piccolini	2	6	7
(Commonwealth of Independent States) E Brioukhovets	6	1	5
Q	(United States) Patty O'Reilly	3	2
15	(Germany) B Rittner	6	6
14	(Czechoslovakia) R Zrubáková	6	6
Q	(Netherlands) K Boogert	1	4
Q	(United States) C Kuhlman	4	4
(Japan) N Sawamatsu	6	6
Q	(Germany) P Begerow	3	3
(Australia) R McQuillan	6	6

Second round
3	(United States) J Capriati	6	2	6
WC	(Germany) S Meier	3	6	1
(Italy) K Piccolini	1	4
15	(Germany) B Rittner	6	6
14	(Czechoslovakia) R Zrubáková	4	7	6
(Japan) N Sawamatsu	6	5	4
(Australia) R McQuillan	3	1^{r}
6	(Czechoslovakia) J Novotná	6	0

Third round
3	(United States) J Capriati	7	6
15	(Germany) B Rittner	5	3
14	(Czechoslovakia) R Zrubáková	6	6
6	(Czechoslovakia) J Novotná	3	4

Quarterfinals
3	(United States) Jennifer Capriati	6	7
14	(Czechoslovakia) Radomira Zrubáková	3	5

=== Bottom half ===
==== Section 1 ====
First round
(Australia) N Provis	4	6	3
(Italy) S Cecchini	6	3	6
(Germany) C Kohde-Kilsch	2	5
(Latvia) L Savchenko-Neiland	6	7
(Finland) P Thorén	1	3
12	(Peru) L Gildemeister	6	6
13	(Austria) J Wiesner	6	6
(Germany) M Babel	3	2
(Argentina) B Fulco-Villella	6	1	6
(Canada) R Simpson-Alter	4	6	7
WC	(Germany) C Hofmann	1	0
Q	(Bulgaria) L Bacheva	6	6

Second round
5	(Germany) A Huber	6	2	0
(Italy) S Cecchini	1	6	6
(Latvia) L Savchenko-Neiland	0	3
12	(Peru) L Gildemeister	6	6
13	(Austria) J Wiesner	6	6
(Canada) R Simpson-Alter	1	2
Q	(Bulgaria) L Bacheva	2	1
4	(United States) M Joe Fernández	6	6

Third round
(Italy) S Cecchini	6	6
12	(Peru) L Gildemeister	1	2
13	(Austria) J Wiesner	4	4
4	(United States) M Joe Fernández	6	6

Quarterfinals
(Italy) Sandra Cecchini	6	7
4	(United States) Mary Joe Fernández	1	6

==== Section 2 ====
First round
(France) S Niox-Château	1	1
(United States) D Faber	6	6
Q	(Australia) J Faull	6	1	2
(United States) K Rinaldi	4	6	6
Q	(Germany) A Glass	2	4
10	(Belgium) S Appelmans	6	6
16	(Commonwealth of Independent States) N Zvereva	6	6
(United States) D Graham	1	3
(Argentina) F Labat	0	3
Q	(Germany) K Kschwendt	6	6
(Japan) M Kidowaki	6	5	6
(Japan) A Kijimuta	2	7	3

Second round
8	(France) N Tauziat	6	6
(United States) D Faber	2	0
(United States) K Rinaldi	6	6	4
10	(Belgium) S Appelmans	7	4	6
16	(Commonwealth of Independent States) N Zvereva	6	6
Q	(Germany) K Kschwendt	1	4
(Japan) M Kidowaki	0	3
2	(Spain) A Sánchez Vicario	6	6

Third round
8	(France) N Tauziat	3	6	5
10	(Belgium) S Appelmans	6	1	7
16	(Commonwealth of Independent States) N Zvereva	6	3
2	(Spain) A Sánchez Vicario	7	6

Quarterfinals
10	(Belgium) Sabine Appelmans	0	3
2	(Spain) Arantxa Sánchez Vicario	6	6
