= 1992 Thriftway ATP Championships – Doubles =

Doubles
- 1992 Thriftway ATP Championships

Final
- Champions: (Australia) Mark Woodforde; (Australia) Todd Woodbridge
- Runners-up: (United States) Patrick McEnroe; (United States) Jonathan Stark
- Score: 6–3, 1–6, 6–3

Details
- Draw: 28 (4WC/2Q)
- Seeds: 8

Events
| Singles | Doubles |
- Cincinnati Masters

Ken Flach and Robert Seguso were the defending champions, but Robert Seguso chose not to participate. Flach partnered with Todd Witsken, but lost in the quarterfinals to Mark Woodforde and Todd Woodbridge .

Woodforde and Woodbridge went on to win the title, defeating Patrick McEnroe and Jonathan Stark in the finals, 6–3, 1–6, 6–3.

== Seeds ==
The top four seeded teams received byes into the second round.

1. (Australia) John Fitzgerald / (Sweden) Anders Järryd (second round)
2. (Australia) Mark Woodforde / (Australia) Todd Woodbridge (champions)
3. (United States) Jim Grabb / (Australia) Richey Reneberg (quarterfinals)
4. (United States) Kelly Jones / (United States) Rick Leach (second round)
5. (United States) Scott Davis / (United States) David Pate (quarterfinals)
6. (United States) Steve DeVries / (Australia) David Macpherson (second round)
7. (United States) Ken Flach / (United States) Todd Witsken (quarterfinals)
8. (Australia) Mark Kratzmann / (Australia) Wally Masur (first round)

== Draw ==
Key

- Q = Qualifier
- WC = Wild card
- LL = Lucky loser
- Alt = Alternate
- ITF = ITF entry
- PR = Protected ranking
- SR = Special ranking
- SE = Special exempt
- JE = Junior exempt
- JR = Junior Accelerator Programme entrant
- CO = College Accelerator Programme entrant
- NG = Next Gen Accelerator Program entrant
- w/o = Walkover
- r = Retired
- d = Defaulted

=== Finals ===
Semifinals

Final

- (France) Guy Forget
- (Switzerland) Jakob Hlasek
6
6^{3}
2

- (United States) Patrick McEnroe
- (United States) Jonathan Stark
4
7^{7}
6

- (United States) Patrick McEnroe
- (United States) Jonathan Stark
3
6
3

2
- (Australia) Todd Woodbridge
- (Australia) Mark Woodforde
6
1
6

- (United States) Mike Briggs
- (United States) Trevor Kronemann
2
4

2
- (Australia) Todd Woodbridge
- (Australia) Mark Woodforde
6
6

=== Top half ===
First round

Second round

Quarterfinals

Semifinals

1/WC
- (Australia) J Fitzgerald
- (Sweden) A Järryd
3
4

WC
- (Sweden) S Edberg
- (United States) P Sampras
4
4

- (France) G Forget
- (Switzerland) J Hlasek
6
6

- (France) G Forget
- (Switzerland) J Hlasek
6
6

- (France) G Forget
- (Switzerland) J Hlasek
7^{7}
7^{7}

- (Sweden) R Båthman
- (Sweden) R Bergh
3
6^{5}

- (United States) P Galbraith
- (South Africa) D Visser
6^{4}
6^{5}

- (United States) P Galbraith
- (South Africa) D Visser
6
7^{7}

- (United States) P Galbraith
- (South Africa) D Visser
1
7^{7}
6

- (Canada) G Connell
- (Canada) G Michibata
6
6^{5}
6

- (Canada) G Connell
- (Canada) G Michibata
6
6^{5}
4

8
- (Australia) M Kratzmann
- (Australia) W Masur
2
7^{7}
3

- (France) G Forget
- (Switzerland) J Hlasek
6
6^{3}
2

- (United States) P McEnroe
- (United States) J Stark
4
7^{7}
6

3
- (United States) J Grabb
- (United States) R Reneberg
2
7
6

- (United States) Cannon
- (United States) G Van Emburgh
6
6

- (United States) Cannon
- (United States) G Van Emburgh
6
5
2

- (United States) K Kinnear
- (United States) S Salumaa
1
2

3
- (United States) J Grabb
- (United States) R Reneberg
5
4

- (United States) P McEnroe
- (United States) J Stark
2
7
6

- (United States) P McEnroe
- (United States) J Stark
7
6

- (Czechoslovakia) P Korda
- (United States) J Pugh
6
5
0

- (United States) P McEnroe
- (United States) J Stark
6
6

Q
- (Italy) G Pozzi
- (Italy) S Pescosolido
5
6^{7}

6
- (United States) S DeVries
- (Australia) D Macpherson
2
3

6
- (United States) S DeVries
- (Australia) D Macpherson
7
7^{9}

=== Bottom half ===
First round

Second round

Quarterfinals

Semifinals

5
- (United States) S Davis
- (United States) D Pate
7^{7}
6

- (South Africa) W Ferreira
- (South Africa) P Norval
6^{3}
4

5
- (United States) S Davis
- (United States) D Pate
7
6

- (United Kingdom) N Broad
- (South Africa) B Talbot
5
3

WC
- (United States) A Agassi
- (United States) B Gilbert
5
4

WC
- (United States) A Agassi
- (United States) B Gilbert
7
6

5
- (United States) S Davis
- (United States) D Pate
6^{11}
4

- (United States) M Briggs
- (United States) T Kronemann
5
7^{7}
6

- (United States) M Briggs
- (United States) T Kronemann
7^{13}
6

- (United States) K Curren
- (Italy) D Nargiso
7
6^{3}
4

- (United States) M Briggs
- (United States) T Kronemann
6
6

4
- (United States) K Jones
- (United States) R Leach
2
2

- (United States) M Briggs
- (United States) T Kronemann
2
4

7
- (United States) K Flach
- (United States) T Witsken
6
7

2
- (Australia) M Woodforde
- (Australia) T Woodbridge
6
6

WC
- (United States) B Shelton
- (United States) M Washington
3
5

7
- (United States) K Flach
- (United States) T Witsken
6
6

- (United States) B Garnett
- (Australia) J Stoltenberg
6^{5}
6
5

Q
- (United States) D Flach
- (United States) T Ho
1
1

Q
- (United States) D Flach
- (United States) T Ho
7^{7}
1
7

7
- (United States) K Flach
- (United States) T Witsken
6
3
4

- (United States) L Jensen
- (Australia) L Warder
6^{4}
6^{4}

2
- (Australia) M Woodforde
- (Australia) T Woodbridge
4
6
6

- (South Africa) D Adams
- (Russia) A Olhovskiy
7^{7}
7^{7}

- (South Africa) D Adams
- (Russia) A Olhovskiy
1
3

2
- (Australia) M Woodforde
- (Australia) T Woodbridge
6
6
