= 1992 Canadian Open – Men's singles =

Men's singles
- 1992 Canadian Open

Final
- Champion: (United States) Andre Agassi
- Runner-up: (United States) Ivan Lendl
- Score: 3–6, 6–2, 6–0

Events
Singles	men	women
Doubles	men	women
- Canadian Open

Andre Agassi defeated Ivan Lendl in the final, 3–6, 6–2, 6–0 to win the men's singles tennis title at the 1992 Canadian Open.

Andrei Chesnokov was the reigning champion, but did not participate this year.

This tournament was also notable for being the 36th and final professional meeting between Lendl and John McEnroe, which Lendl won in their quarterfinal match to end their head-to-head at 21–15 in his favor.

== Seeds ==
1. (Czechoslovakia) Petr Korda (quarterfinals)
2. (United States) Andre Agassi (champion)
3. (United States) Ivan Lendl (final)
4. (United States) Aaron Krickstein (quarterfinals)
5. (United States) John McEnroe (quarterfinals)
6. (United States) MaliVai Washington (semifinals)
7. (United States) Derrick Rostagno (second round)
8. (Israel) Amos Mansdorf (quarterfinals)
9. (United States) David Wheaton (first round)
10. (Australia) Wally Masur (semifinals)
11. (Italy) Gianluca Pozzi (first round)
12. (United States) Bryan Shelton (first round)
13. (United States) Jeff Tarango (second round)
14. (Netherlands) Michiel Schapers (first round)
15. (United States) Richey Reneberg (third round)
16. (South Africa) Christo van Rensburg (first round)

== Draw ==
Key

- Q = Qualifier
- WC = Wild card
- LL = Lucky loser
- Alt = Alternate
- ITF = ITF entry
- PR = Protected ranking
- SR = Special ranking
- SE = Special exempt
- JE = Junior exempt
- JR = Junior Accelerator Programme entrant
- CO = College Accelerator Programme entrant
- NG = Next Gen Accelerator Program entrant
- w/o = Walkover
- r = Retired
- d = Defaulted

=== Finals ===
Semifinals
10	(Australia) Wally Masur	1	2
3	(United States) Ivan Lendl	6	6
6	(United States) MaliVai Washington	6	2	1
2	(United States) Andre Agassi	2	6	6

Final
3	(United States) Ivan Lendl	6	2	0
2	(United States) Andre Agassi	3	6	6

=== Top half ===
==== Section 1 ====
First round
WC	(Canada) S Lareau	0	2
(United States) R Weiss	6	6
(Mexico) L Lavalle	7	6
Q	(Sweden) N Kroon	5	4
(United States) P McEnroe	6^{2}	4
15	(United States) R Reneberg	7^{7}	6
10	(Australia) W Masur	4	6	6
(Germany) K Braasch	6	3	4
Q	(Sweden) M Stadling	6^{4}	6	2
Q	(United States) B Pearce	7^{7}	2	6
(Germany) P Kühnen	7^{7}	6
(Czechoslovakia) M Damm	6^{4}	3

Second round
1	(Czechoslovakia) P Korda	6	6
(United States) R Weiss	4	4
(Mexico) L Lavalle	2	3
15	(United States) R Reneberg	6	6
10	(Australia) W Masur	4	6	6
Q	(United States) B Pearce	6	4	1
(Germany) P Kühnen	7	3	7
7	(United States) D Rostagno	5	6	5

Third round
1	(Czechoslovakia) P Korda	6	6
15	(United States) R Reneberg	4	2
10	(Australia) W Masur	4	6	6
(Germany) P Kühnen	6	3	2

Quarterfinals
1	(Czechoslovakia) P Korda	6^{3}	6	3
10	(Australia) W Masur	7^{7}	4	6

==== Section 2 ====
First round
(United Kingdom) J Bates	1	4
(United States) T Martin	6	6
(Australia) S Youl	7	6
(Brazil) D Marcelino	5	1
(United States) F Montana	3	3
13	(United States) J Tarango	6	6
12	(United States) B Shelton	6^{4}	5
(United States) J Stark	7^{7}	7
(United States) T Witsken	4	6	6
(Germany) A Mronz	6	4	0
(United States) J Grabb	6	7^{7}
(France) G Raoux	4	6^{2}

Second round
3	(United States) I Lendl	6	6
(United States) T Martin	3	2
(Australia) S Youl	7^{7}	6
13	(United States) J Tarango	6^{5}	4
(United States) J Stark	6	7
(United States) T Witsken	4	5
(United States) J Grabb	1	1
5	(United States) J McEnroe	6	6

Third round
3	(United States) I Lendl	6	6
(Australia) S Youl	1	4
(United States) J Stark	0	2
5	(United States) J McEnroe	6	6

Quarterfinals
3	(United States) I Lendl	6	6
5	(United States) J McEnroe	2	4

==== Section 3 ====
First round
Q	(United States) R Schmidt	3	4
(Canada) G Connell	6	6
(Mexico) L Herrera	6	3	4
(United States) K Curren	2	6	6
(Israel) G Bloom	6	6
11	(Italy) G Pozzi	1	3
14	(Netherlands) M Schapers	5	4
(Australia) S Stolle	7	6
(Sweden) H Holm	6	6
Q	(United States) K Thorne	4	4
(Germany) A Thoms	7^{11}	6
(Brazil) F Roese	6^{9}	1

Second round
6	(United States) M Washington	4	7^{7}	6
(Canada) G Connell	6	6^{4}	1
(United States) K Curren	6	6
(Israel) G Bloom	4	3
(Australia) S Stolle	6^{6}	3
(Sweden) H Holm	7^{8}	6
(Germany) A Thoms	4	3
4	(United States) A Krickstein	6	6

Third round
6	(United States) M Washington	6	7^{11}
(United States) K Curren	4	6^{9}
(Sweden) H Holm	4	6^{4}
4	(United States) A Krickstein	6	7^{7}

Quarterfinals
6	(United States) M Washington	7^{7}	6
4	(United States) A Krickstein	6^{5}	1

==== Section 4 ====
First round
(South Africa) G Muller	2	4
(United States) C Adams	6	6
(Canada) C Pridham	6	7^{8}
WC	(Canada) A Sznajder	1	6^{6}
(Australia) J Stoltenberg	6	6
9	(United States) D Wheaton	3	4
16	(South Africa) C van Rensburg	7^{7}	4	4
Q	(United States) S Bryan	6^{3}	6	6
WC	(Canada) M Laurendeau	6^{4}	6	5
WC	(Canada) G Rusedski	7	3	7
WC	(Canada) D Nestor	6	6
Q	(Italy) C Caratti	4	4

Second round
8	(Israel) A Mansdorf	6	6
(United States) C Adams	3	4
(Canada) C Pridham	6^{3}	7^{7}	6
(Australia) J Stoltenberg	7^{7}	6^{3}	4
Q	(United States) S Bryan	4	3
WC	(Canada) G Rusedski	6	6
WC	(Canada) D Nestor	1	3
2	(United States) A Agassi	6	6

Third round
8	(Israel) A Mansdorf	6	7
(Canada) C Pridham	2	5
WC	(Canada) G Rusedski	4	1
2	(United States) A Agassi	6	6

Quarterfinals
8	(Israel) A Mansdorf	2	4
2	(United States) A Agassi	6	6
