= 1992 Canadian Open – Women's singles =

Women's singles
- 1992 Canadian Open

Final
- Champion: (Spain) Arantxa Sánchez Vicario
- Runner-up: (Federal Republic of Yugoslavia) Monica Seles
- Score: 6–4, 3–6, 6–4

Details
- Draw: 56
- Seeds: 16

Events
Singles	men	women
Doubles	men	women
- Canadian Open

Arantxa Sánchez Vicario defeated Monica Seles in the final, 6–4, 3–6, 6–4 to win the women's singles tennis title at the 1992 Canadian Open.

Jennifer Capriati was the reigning champion, but did not compete this year.

== Seeds ==
The first eight seeds received a bye to the second round.

1. (Federal Republic of Yugoslavia) Monica Seles (final)
2. (Spain) Arantxa Sánchez Vicario (champion)
3. (United States) Mary Joe Fernández (quarterfinals)
4. (Switzerland) Manuela Maleeva Fragnière (quarterfinals)
5. (Bulgaria) Katerina Maleeva (third round)
6. (France) Nathalie Tauziat (quarterfinals)
7. (Czechoslovakia) Helena Suková (semifinals)
8. (United States) Lori McNeil (semifinals)
9. (Austria) Judith Wiesner (third round)
10. (South Africa) Amanda Coetzer (third round)
11. (Commonwealth of Independent States) Natasha Zvereva (third round)
12. (Netherlands) Brenda Schultz (second round)
13. (Peru) Laura Gildemeister (second round)
14. (Japan) Naoko Sawamatsu (third round)
15. (United States) Gigi Fernández (first round)
16. (Australia) Nicole Provis (second round)

== Draw ==
Key

- Q = Qualifier
- WC = Wild card
- LL = Lucky loser
- Alt = Alternate
- ITF = ITF entry
- PR = Protected ranking
- SR = Special ranking
- SE = Special exempt
- JE = Junior exempt
- JR = Junior Accelerator Programme entrant
- CO = College Accelerator Programme entrant
- NG = Next Gen Accelerator Program entrant
- w/o = Walkover
- r = Retired
- d = Defaulted

=== Finals ===
Quarterfinals
1	(Federal Republic of Yugoslavia) Monica Seles	6	4	6
(Canada) Patricia Hy	1	6	1
4	(Switzerland) Manuela Maleeva-Fragnière	5	2
8	(United States) Lori McNeil	7	6
7	(Czechoslovakia) Helena Suková	6	3	6
3	(United States) Mary Joe Fernández	3	6	4
6	(France) Nathalie Tauziat	2	4
2	(Spain) Arantxa Sánchez Vicario	6	6

Semifinals
1	(Federal Republic of Yugoslavia) Monica Seles	6	6
8	(United States) Lori McNeil	3	4
7	(Czechoslovakia) Helena Suková	2	5
2	(Spain) Arantxa Sánchez Vicario	6	7

Final
1	(Federal Republic of Yugoslavia) Monica Seles	4	6	4
2	(Spain) Arantxa Sánchez Vicario	6	3	6

=== Top half ===
==== Section 1 ====
First round
(United States) M Werdel	6	6
(Germany) C Porwik	3	3
(Canada) R Simpson-Alter	6	3	3
(United States) L Allen	3	6	6
WC	(Canada) M Drake	4	3
14	(Japan) N Sawamatsu	6	6
15	(United States) G Fernández	2	6	4
Q	(Japan) R Hiraki	6	2	6
(Canada) P Hy	2	6	6
(United States) K Rinaldi	6	3	0
(France) N van Lottum	6	6
WC	(Canada) V Webb	2	2

Second round
1	(Federal Republic of Yugoslavia) M Seles	6	6
(United States) M Werdel	2	4
(United States) L Allen	1	0
14	(Japan) N Sawamatsu	6	6
Q	(Japan) R Hiraki	6	3	2
(Canada) P Hy	3	6	6
(France) N van Lottum	3	3
5	(Bulgaria) K Maleeva	6	6

Third round
1	(Federal Republic of Yugoslavia) M Seles	6	6
14	(Japan) N Sawamatsu	1	2
(Canada) P Hy	6	6
5	(Bulgaria) K Maleeva	3	3

Quarterfinals
1	(Federal Republic of Yugoslavia) M Seles	6	4	6
(Canada) P Hy	1	6	1

==== Section 2 ====
First round
Q	(United States) L Raymond	6	3	6
(South Africa) M de Swardt	4	6	3
(Sweden) C Lindqvist	6	4	6
Q	(United States) E Burgin	2	6	0
(United States) P Fendick	6	2	2
9	(Austria) J Wiesner	2	6	6
12	(Netherlands) B Schultz	6	1	7^{8}
(United States) H Cioffi	2	6	6^{6}
(United States) L Harvey-Wild	2	6	2
(United States) C Cunningham	6	3	6
(United States) D Faber	6	6
(Belgium) D Monami	0	4

Second round
4	(Switzerland) M Maleeva-Fragnière	6	6
Q	(United States) L Raymond	2	1
(Sweden) C Lindqvist	4	5
9	(Austria) J Wiesner	6	7
12	(Netherlands) B Schultz	3	7	6^{5}
(United States) C Cunningham	6	5	7^{7}
(United States) D Faber	2	3
8	(United States) L McNeil	6	6

Third round
4	(Switzerland) M Maleeva-Fragnière	6	7
9	(Austria) J Wiesner	3	5
(United States) C Cunningham	5	4
8	(United States) L McNeil	7	6

Quarterfinals
4	(Switzerland) M Maleeva-Fragnière	5	2
8	(United States) L McNeil	7	6

=== Bottom half ===
==== Section 3 ====
First round
Q	(United Kingdom) C Wood	7	6
(United States) T Whittington	5	4
Q	(Netherlands) M Oremans	5	6	6
(Australia) R Stubbs	7	2	4
(Netherlands) S Rottier	0	6^{2}
16	(Australia) N Provis	6	7^{7}
11	(Commonwealth of Independent States) N Zvereva	6	7^{7}
(France) I Demongeot	3	6^{5}
Q	(United States) J Santrock	6	6
(Australia) J Byrne	1	1
(France) P Paradis-Mangon	6	6
Q	(Australia) E Smylie	2	2

Second round
7	(Czechoslovakia) H Suková	6	6
Q	(United Kingdom) C Wood	4	0
Q	(Netherlands) M Oremans	6	4	6
16	(Australia) N Provis	3	6	3
11	(Commonwealth of Independent States) N Zvereva	6	6
Q	(United States) J Santrock	3	3
(France) P Paradis-Mangon	1	4
3	(United States) MJ Fernández	6	6

Third round
7	(Czechoslovakia) H Suková	6	7
Q	(Netherlands) M Oremans	0	5
11	(Commonwealth of Independent States) N Zvereva	4	6^{4}
3	(United States) MJ Fernández	6	7^{7}

Quarterfinals
7	(Czechoslovakia) H Suková	6	3	6
3	(United States) MJ Fernández	3	6	4

==== Section 4 ====
First round
(Canada) H Kelesi	6	6
(Hungary) A Temesvári-Trunkos	0	2
WC	(Canada) S Jeyaseelan	1	0
(South Africa) E Reinach	6	6
(United States) A Keller	2	7^{7}	3
13	(Peru) L Gildemeister	6	6^{2}	6
10	(South Africa) A Coetzer	6	6
(Czechoslovakia) K Habšudová	1	2
Q	(United States) S Stafford	1	2
(France) A Dechaume	6	6
(France) S Testud	4	5
(United States) C Kuhlman	6	7

Second round
6	(France) N Tauziat	6	6
(Canada) H Kelesi	2	4
(South Africa) E Reinach	6	6
13	(Peru) L Gildemeister	2	1
10	(South Africa) A Coetzer	6	6
(France) A Dechaume	4	0
(United States) C Kuhlman	1	1
2	(Spain) A Sánchez Vicario	6	6

Third round
6	(France) N Tauziat	6	4	6
(South Africa) E Reinach	4	6	2
10	(South Africa) A Coetzer	6^{3}	2
2	(Spain) A Sánchez Vicario	7^{7}	6

Quarterfinals
6	(France) N Tauziat	2	4
2	(Spain) A Sánchez Vicario	6	6
