= 1992 Family Circle Cup – Singles =

Singles
- 1992 Family Circle Cup

Final
- Champion: (Argentina) Gabriela Sabatini
- Runner-up: (Spain) Conchita Martínez
- Score: 6–1, 6–4

Details
- Draw: 56 (8 Q / 2 WC)
- Seeds: 16

Events
Singles	Doubles
- Family Circle Cup

Gabriela Sabatini was the defending champion and successfully defended her title, defeating Conchita Martínez in the final, 6–1, 6–4.

== Seeds ==
The top eight seeds received a bye to the second round.

1. (Argentina) Gabriela Sabatini (champion)
2. (United States) Martina Navratilova (third round)
3. (Spain) Arantxa Sánchez Vicario (semifinal)
4. (United States) Jennifer Capriati (second round)
5. (Spain) Conchita Martínez (final)
6. (Czechoslovakia) Jana Novotná (third round)
7. (Commonwealth of Independent States) Leila Meskhi (quarterfinal)
8. (United States) Zina Garrison-Jackson (second round)
9. (United States) Gigi Fernández (first round)
10. (Commonwealth of Independent States) Natalia Zvereva (quarterfinal)
11. (Bulgaria) Magdalena Maleeva (second round)
12. (Netherlands) Brenda Schultz (semifinal)
13. (Italy) Sandra Cecchini (third round)
14. (South Africa) Amanda Coetzer (third round)
15. (United States) Patty Fendick (first round)
16. (United States) Debbie Graham (third round)

== Draw ==
Key

- Q = Qualifier
- WC = Wild card
- LL = Lucky loser
- Alt = Alternate
- ITF = ITF entry
- PR = Protected ranking
- SR = Special ranking
- SE = Special exempt
- JE = Junior exempt
- JR = Junior Accelerator Programme entrant
- CO = College Accelerator Programme entrant
- NG = Next Gen Accelerator Program entrant
- w/o = Walkover
- r = Retired
- d = Defaulted

=== Finals ===
Quarterfinals
1	(Argentina) Gabriela Sabatini	6	6
(Canada) Patricia Hy	2	3
12	(Netherlands) Brenda Schultz	6	6
Q	(United States) Caroline Kuhlman	3	1
7	(Commonwealth of Independent States) Leila Meskhi	3	3
3	(Spain) Arantxa Sánchez Vicario	6	6
5	(Spain) Conchita Martínez	6	6
10	(Commonwealth of Independent States) Natalia Zvereva	2	2

Semifinals
1	(Argentina) Gabriela Sabatini	6	6
12	(Netherlands) Brenda Schultz	3	2
3	(Spain) Arantxa Sánchez Vicario	4	5
5	(Spain) Conchita Martínez	6	7

Final
1	(Argentina) Gabriela Sabatini	6	6
5	(Spain) Conchita Martínez	1	4

=== Top half ===
==== Section 1 ====
First round
(United States) H Cioffi	6	6
(Italy) F Bonsignori	0	2
(Poland) K Nowak	4	5
(United States) T Whitlinger	6	7
Q	(Germany) A Kerek	3	2
14	(South Africa) A Coetzer	6	6
11	(Bulgaria) M Maleeva	6	6
Q	(United States) R Jensen	1	1
(Canada) P Hy	6	6
(Italy) L Ferrando	4	4
(Commonwealth of Independent States) E Maniokova	1	3
(Argentina) P Tarabini	6	6

Second round
1	(Argentina) G Sabatini	6	6
(United States) H Cioffi	0	0
(United States) T Whitlinger	3	4
14	(South Africa) A Coetzer	6	6
11	(Bulgaria) M Maleeva	6	3	2
(Canada) P Hy	3	6	6
(Argentina) P Tarabini	4	6	4
6	(Czechoslovakia) J Novotná	6	2	6

Third round
1	(Argentina) G Sabatini	7	6
14	(South Africa) A Coetzer	5	4
(Canada) P Hy	6	3	6
6	(Czechoslovakia) J Novotná	3	6	1

Quarterfinals
1	(Argentina) Gabriela Sabatini	6	6
(Canada) Patricia Hy	2	3

==== Section 2 ====
First round
Q	(Czechoslovakia) D Szabová	1	0
(Germany) V Martinek	6	6
(Canada) H Kelesi	0^{r}
WC	(United States) S Martin	4
(South Africa) R Fairbank-Nideffer	6	6	3
12	(Netherlands) B Schultz	7	3	6
9	(United States) G Fernández	7	2	1
(Germany) S Frankl	6	6	6
(Austria) P Ritter	6	7
Q	(Germany) S Meier	3	6
(Argentina) F Labat	6	2	3
Q	(United States) C Kuhlman	2	6	6

Second round
4	(United States) J Capriati	4	6	4
(Germany) V Martinek	6	1	6
WC	(United States) S Martin	4	2
12	(Netherlands) B Schultz	6	6
(Germany) S Frankl	3	3
(Austria) P Ritter	6	6
Q	(United States) C Kuhlman	4	6	6
8	(United States) Z Garrison-Jackson	6	2	3

Third round
(Germany) V Martinek	2	2
12	(Netherlands) B Schultz	6	6
(Austria) P Ritter	2	5
Q	(United States) C Kuhlman	6	7

Quarterfinals
12	(Netherlands) Brenda Schultz	6	6
Q	(United States) Caroline Kuhlman	3	1

=== Bottom half ===
==== Section 1 ====
First round
Q	(United States) Christine O'Reilly	7	1	3
(United States) A Keller	5	6	6
(United States) A Grossman	6	2	6
(Argentina) M Paz	2	6	2
(Italy) L Garrone	3	4
16	(United States) D Graham	6	6
15	(United States) P Fendick	5	3
(Argentina) I Gorrochategui	7	6
(Commonwealth of Independent States) E Brioukhovets	0	2
Q	(Hungary) A Temesvári-Trunkos	6	6
(Germany) S Hack	6	6
LL	(United States) B Bowes	3	1

Second round
7	(Commonwealth of Independent States) L Meskhi	6	6
(United States) A Keller	1	2
(United States) A Grossman	6	2	3
16	(United States) D Graham	3	6	6
(Argentina) I Gorrochategui	2	6	7
Q	(Hungary) A Temesvári-Trunkos	6	3	5
(Germany) S Hack	4	2
3	(Spain) A Sánchez Vicario	6	6

Third round
7	(Commonwealth of Independent States) L Meskhi	3	6	7
16	(United States) D Graham	6	2	5
(Argentina) I Gorrochategui	2	1
3	(Spain) A Sánchez Vicario	6	6

Quarterfinals
7	(Commonwealth of Independent States) Leila Meskhi	3	3
3	(Spain) Arantxa Sánchez Vicario	6	6

==== Section 2 ====
First round
(United States) M Daniels	6	6
(United States) G Helgeson	1	4
(Argentina) B Fulco-Villella	4	4
(Germany) C Kohde-Kilsch	6	6
(United States) K Adams	2	0
13	(Italy) S Cecchini	6	6
10	(Commonwealth of Independent States) N Zvereva	7	6
Q	(United States) J Shiflet	6	1
WC	(United States) S Collins	2	6
(United States) S Stafford	6	7
(United States) L Harvey-Wild	4	6	2
(United States) D Faber	6	3	6

Second round
5	(Spain) C Martínez	6	6
(United States) M Daniels	0	2
(Germany) C Kohde-Kilsch	4	1
13	(Italy) S Cecchini	6	6
10	(Commonwealth of Independent States) N Zvereva	6	6
(United States) S Stafford	1	1
(United States) D Faber	0	2
2	(United States) M Navratilova	6	6

Third round
5	(Spain) C Martínez	6	6
13	(Italy) S Cecchini	1	2
10	(Commonwealth of Independent States) N Zvereva	6	6
2	(United States) M Navratilova	4	2

Quarterfinals
5	(Spain) Conchita Martínez	6	6
10	(Commonwealth of Independent States) Natalia Zvereva	2	2
