= 1992 Family Circle Cup – Doubles =

Doubles
- 1992 Family Circle Cup

Final
- Champions: (Spain) Arantxa Sánchez Vicario; (Commonwealth of Independent States) Natasha Zvereva
- Runners-up: (Latvia) Larisa Savchenko-Neiland; (Czechoslovakia) Jana Novotná
- Score: 6–4, 6–2

Details
- Draw: 28 (1 Q / 2 WC)
- Seeds: 8

Events
Singles	Doubles
- Family Circle Cup

Larisa Savchenko-Neiland and Jana Novotná won the title, defeating Arantxa Sánchez Vicario and Natasha Zvereva in the final, 6–4, 6–2.

Kohde-Kilsch and Zvereva were the defending champions, but chose to participate with different partners. Kohde-Kilsch partnered Conchita Martínez, whereas Zvereva played alongside Sánchez Vicario. Both teams lost to the eventual champions Savchenko-Neiland and Novotná in the semifinals and finals, respectively.

== Seeds ==
The top four seeds received a bye to the second round.

1. (Czechoslovakia) Jana Novotná / (Latvia) Larisa Savchenko-Neiland (final)
2. (Spain) Arantxa Sánchez Vicario / (Commonwealth of Independent States) Natalia Zvereva (champions)
3. (United States) Patty Fendick / (United States) Gigi Fernández (quarterfinal)
4. (United States) Katrina Adams / (United States) Zina Garrison-Jackson (quarterfinal)
5. (Germany) Claudia Kohde-Kilsch / (Spain) Conchita Martínez (semifinal)
6. (Commonwealth of Independent States) Leila Meskhi / (Argentina) Mercedes Paz (quarterfinal)
7. (United States) Mary Lou Daniels / (South Africa) Rosalyn Fairbank-Nideffer (semifinal)
8. (Italy) Sandra Cecchini / (Argentina) Patricia Tarabini (quarterfinal)

== Draw ==
Key

- Q = Qualifier
- WC = Wild card
- LL = Lucky loser
- Alt = Alternate
- ITF = ITF entry
- PR = Protected ranking
- SR = Special ranking
- SE = Special exempt
- JE = Junior exempt
- JR = Junior Accelerator Programme entrant
- CO = College Accelerator Programme entrant
- NG = Next Gen Accelerator Program entrant
- w/o = Walkover
- r = Retired
- d = Defaulted

=== Finals ===
Semifinals

Final

1
(Czechoslovakia) Jana Novotná
(Latvia) Larisa Savchenko-Neiland
6
6

5
- (Germany) Claudia Kohde-Kilsch
- (Spain) Conchita Martínez
4
4

1
- (Czechoslovakia) Jana Novotná
- (Latvia) Larisa Savchenko-Neiland
4
2

2
(Spain) Arantxa Sánchez Vicario
(Commonwealth of Independent States) Natalia Zvereva
6
6

7
- (United States) Mary Lou Daniels
- (South Africa) Rosalyn Fairbank-Nideffer
1
1

2
(Spain) Arantxa Sánchez Vicario
(Commonwealth of Independent States) Natalia Zvereva
6
6

=== Top half ===
First round

Second round

Quarterfinals

Semifinals

1
(Czechoslovakia) J Novotná
(Latvia) L Savchenko-Neiland
6
6

- (United States) A Grossman
- (Austria) P Ritter
3
2

- (United States) E Burgin
- (Bulgaria) K Maleeva
1
0

(United States) E Burgin
(Bulgaria) K Maleeva
6
6

1
(Czechoslovakia) J Novotná
(Latvia) L Savchenko-Neiland
6
6

- (Italy) L Ferrando
- (Netherlands) B Schultz
3
6
2

8
- (Italy) S Cecchini
- (Argentina) P Tarabini
1
0

(South Africa) A Coetzer
(Hungary) A Temesvári-Trunkos
6
4
6

- (South Africa) A Coetzer
- (Hungary) A Temesvári-Trunkos
4
2

- (United States) L Harvey-Wild
- (United States) S Stafford
6
2
4

8
(Italy) S Cecchini
(Argentina) P Tarabini
6
6

8
(Italy) S Cecchini
(Argentina) P Tarabini
2
6
6

1
(Czechoslovakia) Jana Novotná
(Latvia) Larisa Savchenko-Neiland
6
6

5
- (Germany) Claudia Kohde-Kilsch
- (Spain) Conchita Martínez
4
4

3
(United States) P Fendick
(United States) G Fernández
6
6

- (Germany) S Hack
- (United States) A Schwartz
5
5

- (Poland) R Baranski
- (United States) L Glitz
2
4

(Poland) R Baranski
(United States) L Glitz
7
7

3
- (United States) P Fendick
- (United States) G Fernández
5
5

- (Czechoslovakia) Z Málková
- (Czechoslovakia) D Szabová
6
3

5
(Germany) C Kohde-Kilsch
(Spain) C Martínez
7
7

(United States) D Graham
(United States) G Helgeson
7
6

- (United States) D Graham
- (United States) G Helgeson
2
2

- (Commonwealth of Independent States) E Brioukhovets
- (Commonwealth of Independent States) E Maniokova
1
2

5
(Germany) C Kohde-Kilsch
(Spain) C Martínez
6
6

5
(Germany) C Kohde-Kilsch
(Spain) C Martínez
6
6

=== Bottom half ===
First round

Second round

Quarterfinals

Semifinals

7
(United States) M Daniels
(South Africa) R Fairbank-Nideffer
6
6
6

- (Argentina) I Gorrochategui
- (Argentina) F Labat
2
7
3

7
(United States) M Daniels
(South Africa) R Fairbank-Nideffer
6
6

(South Africa) L Gregory
(United States) T Whitlinger
6
6

- (South Africa) L Gregory
- (United States) T Whitlinger
3
4

- (Germany) S Frankl
- (Germany) S Meier
1
3

7
(United States) M Daniels
(South Africa) R Fairbank-Nideffer
7
5
6

Q
- (United States) S Martin
- (United States) E Rossides
3
4

4
- (United States) K Adams
- (United States) Z Garrison-Jackson
6
7
3

WC
(Greece) C Papadáki
(United States) T Whittington
6
6

WC
- (Greece) C Papadáki
- (United States) T Whittington
0
4

4
(United States) K Adams
(United States) Z Garrison-Jackson
6
6

7
- (United States) Mary Lou Daniels
- (South Africa) Rosalyn Fairbank-Nideffer
1
1

6
(Commonwealth of Independent States) L Meskhi
(Argentina) M Paz
6
6

2
(Spain) Arantxa Sánchez Vicario
(Commonwealth of Independent States) Natalia Zvereva
6
6

- (United States) C MacGregor
- (United States) P Mager
3
4

6
(Commonwealth of Independent States) L Meskhi
(Argentina) M Paz
6
6

- (Argentina) B Fulco-Villella
- (Italy) L Garrone
3
6
0

- (United States) H Cioffi
- (United States) A Keller
1
2

(United States) H Cioffi
(United States) A Keller
6
3
6

6
- (Commonwealth of Independent States) L Meskhi
- (Argentina) M Paz
3
1

- (Brazil) L Corsato-Owsianka
- (Germany) A Kerek
3
5

2
(Spain) A Sánchez Vicario
(Commonwealth of Independent States) N Zvereva
6
6

WC
(United States) B Bowes
(United States) W Prausa
6
7

WC
- (United States) B Bowes
- (United States) W Prausa
2
1

2
(Spain) A Sánchez Vicario
(Commonwealth of Independent States) N Zvereva
6
6
