= 1992 Thriftway ATP Championships =

- Date: August 10–17
- Edition: 91st
- Category: ATP Super 9
- Draw: 56S / 28D
- Prize money: $1,125,000
- Surface: Hard / outdoor
- Location: Mason, Ohio, U.S.
- Venue: Lindner Family Tennis Center

Champions

Singles
- (United States) Pete Sampras

Doubles
- (Australia) Todd Woodbridge / (Australia) Mark Woodforde
- Cincinnati Masters

The 1992 Cincinnati Open, known by the corporate title of the Thriftway ATP Championships was a tennis tournament played on outdoor hard courts. It was the 91st edition of the tournament and was part of the ATP Super 9 of the 1992 ATP Tour It took place in Mason, Ohio, United States, from August 10 through August 17, 1992.

The tournament had previously appeared on the Tier III of the WTA Tour but no event was held from 1989 to 2003.

The men's field was headlined by ATP No. 1, French Open, Australian Open and Rome champion Jim Courier, 1987 and 1990 champion Stefan Edberg and 1991 runner-up Pete Sampras. Other top seeds were Indian Wells and Miami champion Michael Chang, Washington champion and French Open runner-up Petr Korda, Wimbledon champion Andre Agassi, defending champion Guy Forget and 1982 champion Ivan Lendl.

== Champions ==
=== Singles ===
(United States) Pete Sampras defeated (United States) Ivan Lendl 6–3, 3–6, 6–3

- It was Pete Sampras' 3rd title of the year and his 11th overall. It was his 1st Masters title.

=== Doubles ===
(Australia) Todd Woodbridge / (Australia) Mark Woodforde defeated (United States) Patrick McEnroe / (United States) Jonathan Stark 6–3, 1–6, 6–3
