= 1992 Canadian Open – Men's doubles =

Men's doubles
- 1992 Canadian Open

Final
- Champions: (United States) Patrick Galbraith (South Africa) Danie Visser
- Runners-up: (United States) Andre Agassi (United States) John McEnroe
- Score: 6–4, 6–4

Details
- Draw: 28
- Seeds: 8

Events
Singles	men	women
Doubles	men	women
- Canadian Open

Patrick Galbraith and Todd Witsken were the defending champions, but competed this year with different partners.

Witsken teamed up with Ken Flach and lost in the second round to Bryan Shelton and Kenny Thorne.

Galbraith teamed up with Danie Visser and successfully defended his title, by defeating Andre Agassi and John McEnroe 6–4, 6–4 in the final.

== Seeds ==
The first four seeds received a bye to the second round.

1. (United States) Jim Grabb / (United States) Richey Reneberg (quarterfinals)
2. (United States) Kelly Jones / (United States) Rick Leach (semifinals)
3. (United States) Ken Flach / (United States) Todd Witsken (second round)
4. (Australia) Mark Kratzmann / (Australia) Wally Masur (semifinals)
5. (United States) Luke Jensen / (Australia) Laurie Warder (first round)
6. (Canada) Grant Connell / (Canada) Glenn Michibata (first round)
7. (United States) Kent Kinnear / (United States) Sven Salumaa (first round)
8. (United States) Patrick Galbraith / (South Africa) Danie Visser (champion)

== Draw ==
Key

- Q = Qualifier
- WC = Wild card
- LL = Lucky loser
- Alt = Alternate
- ITF = ITF entry
- PR = Protected ranking
- SR = Special ranking
- SE = Special exempt
- JE = Junior exempt
- JR = Junior Accelerator Programme entrant
- CO = College Accelerator Programme entrant
- NG = Next Gen Accelerator Program entrant
- w/o = Walkover
- r = Retired
- d = Defaulted

=== Finals ===
Semifinals
8	(United States) Patrick Galbraith (South Africa) Danie Visser	6	6
4	(Australia) Mark Kratzmann (Australia) Wally Masur	3	4
WC	(United States) Andre Agassi (United States) John McEnroe	4	7	6
2	(United States) Kelly Jones (United States) Rick Leach	6	6	4

Final
8	(United States) Patrick Galbraith (South Africa) Danie Visser	6	6
WC	(United States) Andre Agassi (United States) John McEnroe	4	4

=== Top half ===
First round
(United States) J Brown (Czechoslovakia) M Damm	4	4
WC	(Canada) B Gyetko (Canada) S Leblanc	6	6
(United States) B Pearce (South Africa) B Talbot	6	6
(Mexico) L Lavalle (United States) D Wheaton	7	7
(United Kingdom) J Bates (United States) I Lendl	6	3	4
8	(United States) P Galbraith (South Africa) D Visser	4	6	6
Q	(Germany) P Kühnen (Germany) A Mronz	3	2
(United States) K Curren (South Africa) G Muller	6	6
(Australia) S Stolle (Australia) J Stoltenberg	7	6
(United States) C Beckman (Australia) B Dyke	6	2
(Australia) N Borwick (Australia) S Youl	7	3	6
5	(United States) L Jensen (Australia) L Warder	5	6	1

Second round
1	(United States) J Grabb (United States) R Reneberg	7	7
WC	(Canada) B Gyetko (Canada) S Leblanc	5	6
(Mexico) L Lavalle (United States) D Wheaton	4	4
8	(United States) P Galbraith (South Africa) D Visser	6	6
4	(Australia) M Kratzmann (Australia) W Masur	7	7
(United States) K Curren (South Africa) G Muller	5	6
(Australia) S Stolle (Australia) J Stoltenberg	6	6
(Australia) N Borwick (Australia) S Youl	4	2

Quarterfinals
1	(United States) J Grabb (United States) R Reneberg	3	5
8	(United States) P Galbraith (South Africa) D Visser	6	7
4	(Australia) M Kratzmann (Australia) W Masur	7	5	7
(Australia) S Stolle (Australia) J Stoltenberg	6	7	6

Semifinals
8	(United States) P Galbraith (South Africa) D Visser	6	6
4	(Australia) M Kratzmann (Australia) W Masur	3	4

=== Bottom half ===
First round
6	(Canada) G Connell (Canada) G Michibata	3	6
(United Kingdom) N Broad (South Africa) S Kruger	6	7
WC	(Canada) S Lareau (Canada) D Nestor	5	4
WC	(United States) A Agassi (United States) J McEnroe	7	6
(United States) D Eisenman (Netherlands) M Schapers	3	4
Q	(United States) B Shelton (United States) K Thorne	6	6
7	(United States) K Kinnear (United States) S Salumaa	6	4
(United States) M Keil (United States) D Randall	7	6
(United States) S Cannon (United States) G Van Emburgh	6	7
(United States) B Garnett (United States) F Montana	4	6
(United States) P McEnroe (United States) J Stark	6	3	6
(United States) J Pugh (United States) R Seguso	2	6	0

Second round
(United Kingdom) N Broad (South Africa) S Kruger	4	3
WC	(United States) A Agassi (United States) J McEnroe	6	6
Q	(United States) B Shelton (United States) K Thorne	6	6
3	(United States) K Flach (United States) T Witsken	3	4
(United States) M Keil (United States) D Randall	6	6	5
(United States) S Cannon (United States) G Van Emburgh	7	2	7
(United States) P McEnroe (United States) J Stark	6	1	5
2	(United States) K Jones (United States) R Leach	3	6	7

Quarterfinals
WC	(United States) A Agassi (United States) J McEnroe	7	6
Q	(United States) B Shelton (United States) K Thorne	5	4
(United States) S Cannon (United States) G Van Emburgh	3	4
2	(United States) K Jones (United States) R Leach	6	6

Semifinals
WC	(United States) A Agassi (United States) J McEnroe	4	7	6
2	(United States) K Jones (United States) R Leach	6	6	4
