= 1992 Thriftway ATP Championships – Singles =

Singles
- 1992 Thriftway ATP Championships

Final
- Champion: (United States) Pete Sampras
- Runner-up: (United States) Ivan Lendl
- Score: 6–3, 3–6, 6–3

Details
- Draw: 56
- Seeds: 16

Events
Singles	Doubles
← 1991 ·	Thriftway ATP Championships	· 1993 →

Pete Sampras defeated Ivan Lendl in the final, 6–3, 3–6, 6–3 to win the singles tennis title at the 1992 Cincinnati Masters.

Guy Forget was the defending champion, but lost to Todd Woodbridge in the second round.

== Seeds ==
The top eight seeds received a bye to the second round.

1. (United States) Jim Courier (third round)
2. (Sweden) Stefan Edberg (semifinals)
3. (United States) Pete Sampras (champion)
4. (United States) Michael Chang (semifinals)
5. (Czechoslovakia) Petr Korda (quarterfinals)
6. (United States) Andre Agassi (third round)
7. (France) Guy Forget (second round)
8. (United States) Ivan Lendl (final)
9. (South Africa) Wayne Ferreira (first round, retired)
10. (United States) ~~Aaron Krickstein~~ (withdrew due to a broken bone in his foot)
11. (Netherlands) Richard Krajicek (third round, retired)
12. (United States) MaliVai Washington (first round)
13. (United States) Brad Gilbert (third round)
14. (Commonwealth of Independent States) Alexander Volkov (second round)
15. (Israel) Amos Mansdorf (third round)
16. (Commonwealth of Independent States) Andrei Cherkasov (second round)

== Draw ==
=== Key ===
- Q = Qualifier
- WC = Wild card
- LL = Lucky loser
- Alt = Alternate
- SE = Special exempt
- PR = Protected ranking
- ITF = ITF entry
- JE = Junior exempt
- w/o = Walkover
- r = Retired
- d = Defaulted
- SR = Special ranking

=== Finals ===
Quarterfinals
(United States) David Wheaton	1	2
8	(United States) Ivan Lendl	6	6
4	(United States) Michael Chang	6	6
(Peru) Jaime Yzaga	3	1
5	(Czechoslovakia) Petr Korda	3	3
3	(United States) Pete Sampras	6	6
(United States) Jim Grabb	3	6^{5}
2	(Sweden) Stefan Edberg	6	7^{7}

Semifinals
8	(United States) Ivan Lendl	6	6
4	(United States) Michael Chang	3	2
3	(United States) Pete Sampras	6	6
2	(Sweden) Stefan Edberg	2	3

Final
8	(United States) Ivan Lendl	3	6	3
3	(United States) Pete Sampras	6	3	6

=== Top half ===
==== Section 1 ====
First round
(United States) J Tarango	6	4	3
Q	(United States) R Schmidt	4	6	6
(United States) D Wheaton	6	5	6
(United States) T Witsken	2	7	3
(Australia) J Stoltenberg	3	4
16	(Commonwealth of Independent States) A Cherkasov	6	6
LL	(Canada) G Connell	2	6	3
(France) C Pioline	6	3	6
Q	(United States) T Martin	6	6
(Italy) S Pescosolido	2	2
(Switzerland) J Hlasek	2	6^{5}
(Italy) G Pozzi	6	7^{7}

Second round
1	(United States) J Courier	6	6
Q	(United States) R Schmidt	3	2
(United States) D Wheaton	6	7^{7}
16	(Commonwealth of Independent States) A Cherkasov	2	6^{2}
(France) C Pioline	6	5	6
Q	(United States) T Martin	2	7	4
(Italy) G Pozzi	3	6	1
8	(United States) I Lendl	6	3	6

Third round
1	(United States) J Courier	5	6^{0}
(United States) D Wheaton	7	7^{7}
(France) C Pioline	1	2
8	(United States) I Lendl	6	6

Quarterfinals
(United States) D Wheaton	1	2
8	(United States) I Lendl	6	6

==== Section 2 ====
First round
(South Africa) C van Rensburg	4	2
(Australia) S Stolle	6	6
(Italy) D Nargiso	1	5
(Australia) S Youl	6	7
(United States) J Stark	6^{6}	4
13	(United States) B Gilbert	7^{8}	6
12	(United States) M Washington	6	3	6^{3}
Q	(Sweden) J Carlsson	2	6	7^{7}
(Peru) J Yzaga	6^{6}	6	7
Q	(United States) K Thorne	7^{8}	3	5
(United States) P McEnroe	7	5	5
(France) O Delaître	5	7	7

Second round
4	(United States) M Chang	6	6
(Australia) S Stolle	4	3
(Australia) S Youl	6^{4}	4
13	(United States) B Gilbert	7^{7}	6
Q	(Sweden) J Carlsson	4	6^{5}
(Peru) J Yzaga	6	7^{7}
(France) O Delaître	4	0
6	(United States) A Agassi	6	6

Third round
4	(United States) M Chang	6	6
13	(United States) B Gilbert	2	2
(Peru) J Yzaga	6	4	7
6	(United States) A Agassi	3	6	5

Quarterfinals
4	(United States) M Chang	6	6
(Peru) J Yzaga	3	1

=== Bottom half ===
==== Section 3 ====
First round
Q	(Zimbabwe) K Ullyett	6	1	6^{5}
(United States) D Rostagno	3	6	7^{7}
LL	(South Africa) R Koenig	7	1	3
Q	(South Africa) D Nainkin	5	6	6
Q	(Commonwealth of Independent States) A Olhovskiy	3	2
11	(Netherlands) R Krajicek	6	6
14	(Commonwealth of Independent States) A Volkov	6	7
(Australia) W Masur	4	5
(Australia) M Woodforde	6	7^{7}
(Netherlands) J Siemerink	2	6^{4}
(Mexico) L Lavalle	2	6^{3}
(United States) F Montana	6	7^{7}

Second round
5	(Czechoslovakia) P Korda	3	7^{7}	6
(United States) D Rostagno	6	6^{5}	4
Q	(South Africa) D Nainkin	2	7^{8}	0
11	(Netherlands) R Krajicek	6	6^{6}	6
14	(Commonwealth of Independent States) A Volkov	1	3
(Australia) M Woodforde	6	6
(United States) F Montana	6^{7}	6	3
3	(United States) P Sampras	7^{9}	3	6

Third round
5	(Czechoslovakia) P Korda	6
11	(Netherlands) R Krajicek	3^{r}
(Australia) M Woodforde	6	6^{8}	3
3	(United States) P Sampras	2	7^{10}	6

Quarterfinals
5	(Czechoslovakia) P Korda	3	3
3	(United States) P Sampras	6	6

==== Section 4 ====
First round
(Australia) T Woodbridge	6	6
(Spain) G López	0	2
(United States) J Grabb	6	6
(Switzerland) M Rosset	3	4
(France) T Champion	6	1
9	(South Africa) W Ferreira	0	0^{r}
15	(Israel) A Mansdorf	2	6	7^{9}
(United States) B Shelton	6	4	6^{7}
(Sweden) A Järryd	4	6	1
(United States) R Reneberg	6	1	6
(Sweden) C Bergström	6	6
(United States) K Curren	1	1

Second round
7	(France) G Forget	5	7	3
(Australia) T Woodbridge	7	5	6
(United States) J Grabb	4	6	6
(France) T Champion	6	1	4
15	(Israel) A Mansdorf	6	4	6
(United States) R Reneberg	3	6	4
(Sweden) C Bergström	6^{4}	1
2	(Sweden) S Edberg	7^{7}	6

Third round
(Australia) T Woodbridge	2	6^{4}
(United States) J Grabb	6	7^{7}
15	(Israel) A Mansdorf	4	3
2	(Sweden) S Edberg	6	6

Quarterfinals
(United States) J Grabb	3	6^{5}
2	(Sweden) S Edberg	6	7^{7}
