= 1992 Lufthansa Cup – Doubles =

Doubles
- 1992 Lufthansa Cup

Final
- Champions: (Czechoslovakia) Jana Novotná (Latvia) Larisa Neiland
- Runners-up: (United States) Gigi Fernández (Commonwealth of Independent States) Natalia Zvereva
- Score: 7–6^{(7–5)}, 4–6, 7–5

Details
- Draw: 28 (1 Q / 2 WC)
- Seeds: 8

Events
Singles	Doubles
- Lufthansa Cup

Jana Novotná and Larisa Neiland won the title, defeating Gigi Fernández and Natalia Zvereva in the finals, 7–6^{(7–5)}, 4–6, 7–5.

Larisa Neiland and Natasha Zvereva were the defending champions, but chose to participate with different partners. Neiland partnered Jana Novotná. Zvereva played alongside Gigi Fernández. Neiland and Zvereva met in the finals on opposite sides of the net with the former emerging victorious.

== Seeds ==
The top four seeds received a bye to the second round.

1. (Czechoslovakia) Jana Novotná / (Latvia) Larisa Savchenko-Neiland (champions)
2. (United States) Gigi Fernández / (Commonwealth of Independent States) Natalia Zvereva (final)
3. (Spain) Arantxa Sánchez Vicario / (Czechoslovakia) Helena Suková (semifinal)
4. (Australia) ~~Rachel McQuillan~~ / (Australia) ~~Nicole Provis~~ (withdrew)
5. (Canada) Jill Hetherington / (United States) Kathy Rinaldi (quarterfinal)
6. (United States) Jennifer Capriati / (United States) Mary Joe Fernández (quarterfinal)
7. (Netherlands) Manon Bollegraf / (Australia) Rennae Stubbs (quarterfinal)
8. (Argentina) Mercedes Paz / (France) Nathalie Tauziat (second round)

== Draw ==
Key

- Q = Qualifier
- WC = Wild card
- LL = Lucky loser
- Alt = Alternate
- ITF = ITF entry
- PR = Protected ranking
- SR = Special ranking
- SE = Special exempt
- JE = Junior exempt
- JR = Junior Accelerator Programme entrant
- CO = College Accelerator Programme entrant
- NG = Next Gen Accelerator Program entrant
- w/o = Walkover
- r = Retired
- d = Defaulted

=== Finals ===
Semifinals
1	(Czechoslovakia) Jana Novotná (Latvia) Larisa Savchenko-Neiland	6	6
3	(Spain) Arantxa Sánchez-Vicario (Czechoslovakia) Helena Suková	4	1
(Commonwealth of Independent States) Elena Brioukhovets (Germany) Karin Kschwendt	0	1
2	(United States) Gigi Fernández (Commonwealth of Independent States) Natalia Zvereva	6	6

Final
1	(Czechoslovakia) Jana Novotná (Latvia) Larisa Savchenko-Neiland	7	4	7
2	(United States) Gigi Fernández (Commonwealth of Independent States) Natalia Zvereva	6	6	5

=== Top half ===
First round
(Italy) S Cecchini (Peru) L Gildemeister	7	6
(Japan) A Kijimuta (Japan) N Sawamatsu	6	3
(Belgium) S Appelmans (France) J Halard	6	6
(United States) D Graham (United States) Patty O'Reilly	0	2
(Argentina) F Labat (Czechoslovakia) R Zrubáková	6	5	2
7	(Netherlands) M Bollegraf (Australia) R Stubbs	1	7	6
(Czechoslovakia) A Noháčová (Czechoslovakia) D Szabová	2	0
Q	(Germany) R Kochta (Germany) V Martinek	6	6
(United States) S Collins (Netherlands) B Schultz	3	7	5
(United States) C Benjamin (United States) C Kuhlman	6	6	7
(Australia) T Morton (Austria) H Sprung	6	3
5	(Canada) J Hetherington (United States) K Rinaldi	7	6

Second round
1	(Czechoslovakia) J Novotná (Latvia) L Savchenko-Neiland	6	7
(Italy) S Cecchini (Peru) L Gildemeister	2	5
(Belgium) S Appelmans (France) J Halard	7	1	5
7	(Netherlands) M Bollegraf (Australia) R Stubbs	5	6	7
3	(Spain) A Sánchez Vicario (Czechoslovakia) H Suková	6	6
Q	(Germany) R Kochta (Germany) V Martinek	3	1
(United States) C Benjamin (United States) C Kuhlman	1	3
5	(Canada) J Hetherington (United States) K Rinaldi	6	6

Quarterfinals
1	(Czechoslovakia) J Novotná (Latvia) L Savchenko-Neiland	6	6
7	(Netherlands) M Bollegraf (Australia) R Stubbs	2	2
3	(Spain) A Sánchez Vicario (Czechoslovakia) H Suková	7	6
5	(Canada) J Hetherington (United States) K Rinaldi	5	4

Semifinals
1	(Czechoslovakia) Jana Novotná (Latvia) Larisa Savchenko-Neiland	6	6
3	(Spain) Arantxa Sánchez Vicario (Czechoslovakia) Helena Suková	4	1

=== Bottom half ===
First round
8	(Argentina) M Paz (France) N Tauziat	6	6
(United States) A Grossman (Japan) M Kidowaki	1	2
(Argentina) B Fulco-Villella (Canada) R Simpson-Alter	1	6
WC	(Germany) S Graf (Germany) B Rittner	6	7
(Germany) S Frankl (Germany) C Schneider	3	5
(Commonwealth of Independent States) E Brioukhovets (Germany) K Kschwendt	6	7
6	(United States) J Capriati (United States) M Joe Fernández	6	4	4
(Germany) E Pfaff (Austria) J Wiesner	3	6	6
WC	(Germany) K Freye (Germany) M Kochta	6	4	3
(Germany) M Babel (Netherlands) C Vis	3	6	6
(Australia) J Faull (Australia) M Jaggard-Lai	5	3
(West Germany) A Huber (Germany) C Kohde-Kilsch	7	6

Second round
8	(Argentina) M Paz (France) N Tauziat	3	6	4
WC	(Germany) S Graf (Germany) B Rittner	6	4	6
(Commonwealth of Independent States) E Brioukhovets (Germany) K Kschwendt	7	6
(Croatia) M Murić (Socialist Federal Republic of Yugoslavia) P Rihtaric	6	3
6	(United States) J Capriati (United States) M Joe Fernández	6	6
(Germany) M Babel (Netherlands) C Vis	2	0
(West Germany) A Huber (Germany) C Kohde-Kilsch	1	6	4
2	(United States) G Fernández (Commonwealth of Independent States) N Zvereva	6	4	6

Quarterfinals
WC	(Germany) S Graf (Germany) B Rittner	5	6
(Commonwealth of Independent States) E Brioukhovets (Germany) K Kschwendt	7	7
6	(United States) J Capriati (United States) M Joe Fernández	0	0
2	(United States) G Fernández (Commonwealth of Independent States) N Zvereva	6	6

Semifinals
(Commonwealth of Independent States) Elena Brioukhovets (Germany) Karin Kschwendt	0	1
2	(United States) Gigi Fernández (Commonwealth of Independent States) Natalia Zvereva	6	6
