= 1992 Canadian Open – Women's doubles =

Women's doubles
- 1992 Canadian Open

Final
- Champions: (United States) Lori McNeil (Australia) Rennae Stubbs
- Runners-up: (United States) Gigi Fernández (Commonwealth of Independent States) Natasha Zvereva
- Score: 3–6, 7–5, 7–5

Details
- Draw: 28
- Seeds: 8

Events
| Singles | men | women |
| Doubles | men | women |
- Canadian Open

Larisa Savchenko and Natasha Zvereva were the defending champions, but Savchenko did not compete this year.

Zvereva teamed up with Gigi Fernández and lost in the final to Lori McNeil and Rennae Stubbs. The score was 3–6, 7–5, 7–5.

== Seeds ==
The first four seeds received a bye to the second round.

1. (Spain) Arantxa Sánchez Vicario / (Czechoslovakia) Helena Suková (quarterfinals)
2. (United States) Gigi Fernández / (Commonwealth of Independent States) Natasha Zvereva (final)
3. (United States) Lori McNeil / (Australia) Rennae Stubbs (champions)
4. (United States) Patty Fendick / (Czechoslovakia) Andrea Strnadová (quarterfinals)
5. (Australia) Nicole Provis / (South Africa) Elna Reinach (semifinals)
6. (Canada) Jill Hetherington / (United States) Kathy Rinaldi (semifinals)
7. (Bulgaria) Katerina Maleeva / (Germany) Barbara Rittner (first round)
8. (France) Isabelle Demongeot / (France) Nathalie Tauziat (quarterfinals)

== Draw ==
Key

- Q = Qualifier
- WC = Wild card
- LL = Lucky loser
- Alt = Alternate
- ITF = ITF entry
- PR = Protected ranking
- SR = Special ranking
- SE = Special exempt
- JE = Junior exempt
- JR = Junior Accelerator Programme entrant
- CO = College Accelerator Programme entrant
- NG = Next Gen Accelerator Program entrant
- w/o = Walkover
- r = Retired
- d = Defaulted

=== Finals ===
Semifinals
6 | (Canada) Jill Hetherington (United States) Kathy Rinaldi | 4 | 3
3 | (United States) Lori McNeil (Australia) Rennae Stubbs | 6 | 6
5 | (Australia) Nicole Provis (South Africa) Elna Reinach | 6 | 5 | 3
2 | (United States) Gigi Fernández (Commonwealth of Independent States) Natasha Zvereva | 3 | 7 | 6

Final
3 | (United States) Lori McNeil (Australia) Rennae Stubbs | 3 | 7 | 7
2 | (United States) Gigi Fernández (Commonwealth of Independent States) Natasha Zvereva | 6 | 5 | 5

=== Top half ===
First round
(Peru) L Gildemeister (Czechoslovakia) K Habšudová | 6 | 3 | 3
(Japan) A Kijimuta (Japan) N Sawamatsu | 4 | 6 | 6
(Australia) T Morton (United Kingdom) C Wood | 4 | 6^{7}
WC | (Canada) P Hy (Canada) R Simpson-Alter | 6 | 7^{9}
Q | (United States) P O'Reilly (United States) Terri O'Reilly | 4 | 7^{7} | 2
6 | (Canada) J Hetherington (United States) K Rinaldi | 6 | 6^{4} | 6
(Netherlands) I Driehuis (France) N van Lottum | 3 | 1
(France) P Paradis-Mangon (France) S Testud | 6 | 6
(United States) C Kuhlman (United States) S McCarthy | 6 | 1 | 6
(Germany) C Porwik (Australia) E Smylie | 2 | 6 | 3
(United States) E Burgin (South Africa) M de Swardt | 5 | 6 | 1
8 | (France) I Demongeot (France) N Tauziat | 7 | 4 | 6

Second round
1 | (Spain) A Sánchez Vicario (Czechoslovakia) H Suková | 6 | 6
(Japan) A Kijimuta (Japan) N Sawamatsu | 2 | 2
WC | (Canada) P Hy (Canada) R Simpson-Alter | 4 | 4
6 | (Canada) J Hetherington (United States) K Rinaldi | 6 | 6
3 | (United States) L McNeil (Australia) R Stubbs | 6 | 6
(France) P Paradis-Mangon (France) S Testud | 3 | 3
(United States) C Kuhlman (United States) S McCarthy | 2 | 2
8 | (France) I Demongeot (France) N Tauziat | 6 | 6

Quarterfinals
1 | (Spain) A Sánchez Vicario (Czechoslovakia) H Suková | 6 | 4 | 4
6 | (Canada) J Hetherington (United States) K Rinaldi | 1 | 6 | 6
3 | (United States) L McNeil (Australia) R Stubbs | 3 | 6 | 6
8 | (France) I Demongeot (France) N Tauziat | 6 | 4 | 4

Semifinals
6 | (Canada) J Hetherington (United States) K Rinaldi | 4 | 3
3 | (United States) L McNeil (Australia) R Stubbs | 6 | 6

=== Bottom half ===
First round
5 | (Australia) N Provis (South Africa) E Reinach | 7 | 6
(Israel) I Berger (Japan) N Miyagi | 5 | 0
(United States) L Allen (United States) A Henricksson | 4 | 3
(United States) S Stafford (United States) M Werdel | 6 | 6
(United States) C Benjamin (United States) J Santrock | 7 | 4 | 4
(Japan) R Hiraki (France) C Suire | 5 | 6 | 6
7 | (Bulgaria) K Maleeva (Germany) B Rittner | 2 | 1
(Netherlands) B Schultz (Austria) J Wiesner | 6 | 6
(Australia) JA Faull (New Zealand) J Richardson | 5 | 7 | 7
WC | (United States) C Cunningham (Canada) H Kelesi | 7 | 5 | 5
(United States) MJ Fernández (United States) B Nagelsen | 3 | 0
(South Africa) A Coetzer (United States) L Harvey-Wild | 6 | 6

Second round
5 | (Australia) N Provis (South Africa) E Reinach | 6 | 6
(United States) S Stafford (United States) M Werdel | 1 | 3
(Japan) R Hiraki (France) C Suire | 2 | 2
4 | (United States) P Fendick (Czechoslovakia) A Strnadová | 6 | 6
(Netherlands) B Schultz (Austria) J Wiesner | 3 | 4
(Australia) JA Faull (New Zealand) J Richardson | 6 | 6
(South Africa) A Coetzer (United States) L Harvey-Wild | 0 | 4
2 | (United States) G Fernández (Commonwealth of Independent States) N Zvereva | 6 | 6

Quarterfinals
5 | (Australia) N Provis (South Africa) E Reinach | 6^{6} | 7 | 7
4 | (United States) P Fendick (Czechoslovakia) A Strnadová | 7^{8} | 5 | 5
(Australia) JA Faull (New Zealand) J Richardson | 5 | 2
2 | (United States) G Fernández (Commonwealth of Independent States) N Zvereva | 7 | 6

Semifinals
5 | (Australia) N Provis (South Africa) E Reinach | 6 | 5 | 3
2 | (United States) G Fernández (Commonwealth of Independent States) N Zvereva | 3 | 7 | 6
