= 1992 Family Circle Cup =

- Date: March 30 – April 5
- Edition: 20th
- Category: Tier I
- Draw: 56S / 28D
- Prize money: $550,000
- Surface: Clay / outdoor
- Location: Hilton Head Island, SC, U.S.
- Venue: Sea Pines Plantation

Champions

Singles
- (Argentina) Gabriela Sabatini

Doubles
- (Spain) Arantxa Sánchez Vicario (Soviet Union) Natasha Zvereva
| ← 1991 · | Family Circle Cup | · 1993 → |

The 1992 Family Circle Cup was a women's tennis tournament played on outdoor clay courts at the Sea Pines Plantation on Hilton Head Island, South Carolina in the United States and was part of Tier I of the 1992 WTA Tour. It was the 20th edition of the tournament and ran from March 30 through April 5, 1992. First-seeded Gabriela Sabatini won the singles title, her second consecutive title at the event.

== Finals ==
=== Singles ===
(Argentina) Gabriela Sabatini defeated (Spain) Conchita Martínez 6–1, 6–4

- It was Sabatini's 3rd singles title of the year and the 23rd of her career.

=== Doubles ===
(Spain) Arantxa Sánchez Vicario / (Commonwealth of Independent States) Natasha Zvereva defeated (Latvia) Larisa Savchenko-Neiland / (Czechoslovakia) Jana Novotná 6–4, 6–2

- It was Sánchez Vicario's 6th doubles title of the year and the 14th of her career. It was Zvereva's 2nd doubles title of the year and the 21st of her career.
