= 1992 Lufthansa Cup =

- Date: 11–17 May
- Edition: 81st
- Category: Tier I
- Draw: 56S / 28D
- Prize money: $550,000
- Surface: Clay / outdoor
- Location: Berlin. Germany
- Venue: Rot-Weiss Tennis Club

Champions

Singles
- (Germany) Steffi Graf

Doubles
- (Czechoslovakia) Jana Novotná / (Latvia) Larisa Neiland
- WTA German Open

The 1992 Lufthansa Cup was a women's tennis tournament played on outdoor clay courts at the Rot-Weiss Tennis Club in Berlin, Germany that was part of the Tier I category of the 1992 WTA Tour. It was the 81st edition of the tournament and was held from 11 May until 17 May 1992. First-seeded Steffi Graf won the singles title, her sixth at the event, and earned $110,000 first-prize money.

== Finals ==
=== Singles ===
(Germany) Steffi Graf defeated (Spain) Arantxa Sánchez Vicario 4–6, 7–5, 6–2

- It was Graf's 3rd singles title of the year and the 64th of her career.

=== Doubles ===
(Czechoslovakia) Jana Novotná / (Latvia) Larisa Neiland defeated (United States) Gigi Fernández / (Commonwealth of Independent States) Natalia Zvereva 7–6^{(7–5)}, 4–6, 7–5

== Prize money ==
| Event | W | F | SF | QF | Round of 16 | Round of 32 | Round of 64 |
| Singles | $110,000 | $44,000 | $22,000 | $11,000 | $5,675 | $3,025 | $1,650 |
