= 1992 Canadian Open (tennis) =

- Date: July 20–26 (ATP); August 17–23 (WTA)
- Edition: 103rd
- Category: ATP Super 9 (ATP); Tier I Series (WTA)
- Surface: Hard / outdoor
- Location: Toronto (ATP); Montreal (WTA); Canada

Champions

Men's singles
- (United States) Andre Agassi

Women's singles
- (Spain) Arantxa Sánchez Vicario

Men's doubles
- (United States) Andre Agassi / (United States) John McEnroe

Women's doubles
- (United States) Lori McNeil / (Australia) Rennae Stubbs
- Canadian Open

The 1992 Canadian Open was a combined men's and women's tennis tournament played on outdoor hard courts. It was the 103rd edition of the Canada Masters, and was part of the ATP Super 9 of the 1992 ATP Tour, and of the Tier I Series of the 1992 WTA Tour. The men's event took place at the National Tennis Centre in Toronto, Ontario, Canada, from July 20 through July 26, 1992, and the women's event at the Uniprix Stadium in Montreal, Quebec, Canada, from August 17 through August 23, 1992.

== Finals ==
=== Men's singles ===
(United States) Andre Agassi defeated (United States) Ivan Lendl 3–6, 6–2, 6–0

- It was Andre Agassi's 3rd title of the year and his 17th overall. It was his 1st Masters title of the year and his 2nd overall.

=== Women's singles ===
(Spain) Arantxa Sánchez Vicario defeated (Federal Republic of Yugoslavia) Monica Seles 6–3, 4–6, 6–4

- It was Arantxa Sánchez Vicario's 2nd title of the year and her 8th overall. It was her 1st Tier I title.

=== Men's doubles ===
(United States) Patrick Galbraith / (South Africa) Danie Visser defeated (United States) Andre Agassi / (United States) John McEnroe 6–4, 6–4

=== Women's doubles ===
(United States) Lori McNeil / (Australia) Rennae Stubbs defeated (United States) Gigi Fernández / (Commonwealth of Independent States) Natasha Zvereva 3–6, 7–5, 7–5
