= Anna Kournikova career statistics =

List of statistics of Anna Kournikova, a former Russian professional tennis player

Career finals
Discipline	Type	Won	Lost	Total
Singles	Grand Slam	–	–	–
Singles	WTA Finals (Note: Formerly known as: Virginia Slims Championships (until 1995); WTA Tour Championships (until 2014))	–	–	–
Singles	WTA 1000 (Note: Formerly known as: Category 4 & 5 & 6 (until 1989); Tier I (until 2008); WTA Premier Mandatory and 5 (until 2020))	0	3	3
Singles	WTA 500 (Note: Formerly known as: Category 3 (until 1989); Tier II (until 2008); WTA Premier (until 2020))	–	–	–
Singles	WTA 250 (Note: Formerly known as: Category 1 & 2 (until 1989); Tier III & IV & V (until 2008); WTA International (until 2020))	0	1	1
Singles	Olympics	–	–	–
Singles	Total	0	4	4
Doubles	Grand Slam	2	1	3
Doubles	WTA Finals	2	–	2
Doubles	WTA 1000	4	3	7
Doubles	WTA 500	6	7	13
Doubles	WTA 250	2	1	3
Doubles	Olympics	–	–	–
Doubles	Total	16	12	28
Mixed doubles	Grand Slam	–	2	2
Mixed doubles	Total	–	2	2

This is a list of the main career statistics of retired professional tennis player Anna Kournikova.

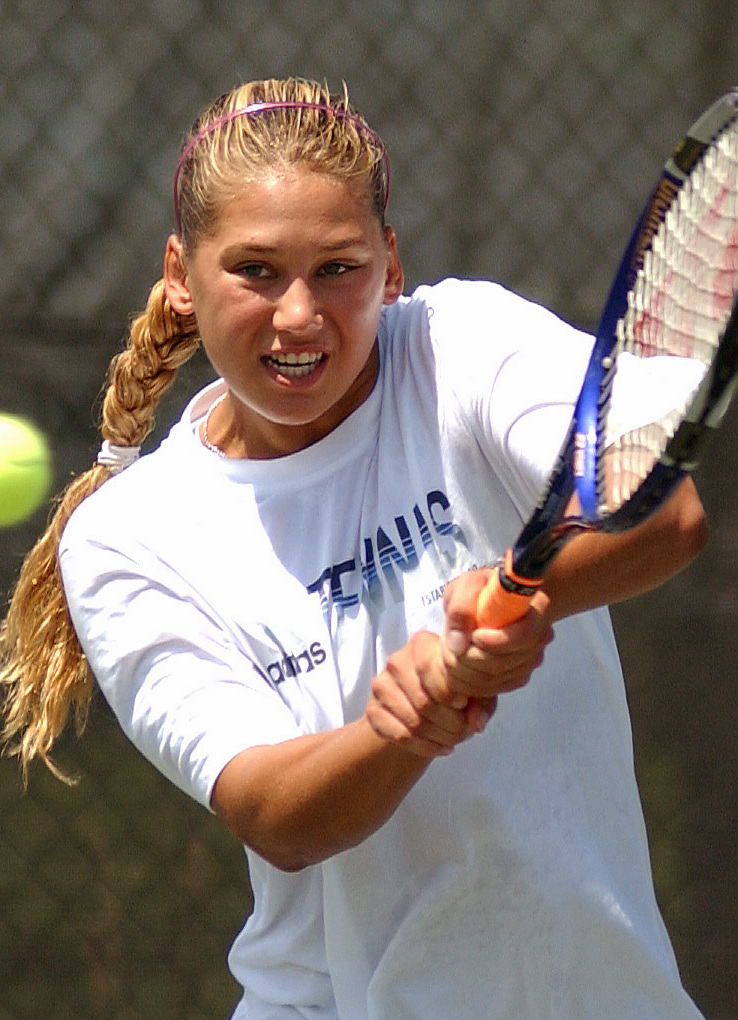
Kournikova at the 2002 Family Circle Cup.

== Performance timelines ==
Key
W	F	SF	QF	#R	RR	Q#	P#	DNQ	A	Z#	PO	G	S	B	NMS	NTI	P	NH

(W) winner; (F) finalist; (SF) semifinalist; (QF) quarterfinalist; (#R) rounds 4, 3, 2, 1; (RR) round-robin stage; (Q#) qualification round; (P#) preliminary round; (DNQ) did not qualify; (A) absent; (Z#) Davis/Fed Cup Zonal Group (with number indication) or (PO) play-off; (G) gold, (S) silver or (B) bronze Olympic/Paralympic medal; (NMS) not a Masters tournament; (NTI) not a Tier I tournament; (P) postponed; (NH) not held; (SR) strike rate (events won / competed); (W–L) win–loss record.
To avoid confusion and double counting, these charts are updated at the conclusion of a tournament or when the player's participation has ended.

Only main-draw results in WTA Tour, Grand Slam tournaments, Billie Jean King Cup (Fed Cup), Hopman Cup and Olympic Games are included in win–loss records.

=== Singles ===
Tournament	1995	1996	1997	1998	1999	2000	2001	2002	2003	SR	W–L	Win%
Grand Slam tournaments
Australian Open	A	A	1R	3R	4R	4R	QF	1R	2R	0 / 7	13–7	65%
French Open	A	A	3R	4R	4R	2R	A	1R	A	0 / 5	9–5	64%
Wimbledon	A	A	SF	A	4R	2R	A	1R	A	0 / 4	9–4	69%
US Open	A	4R	2R	4R	A	3R	A	1R	A	0 / 5	9–5	64%
Win–loss	0–0	3–1	8–4	8–3	9–3	7–4	4–1	0–4	1–1	0 / 21	40–21	66%
Year-end championship
WTA Finals	A	A	A	1R	1R	SF	A	A	A	0 / 3	2–3	40%
National representation
World Group	A	A	A	A	A	8th	A	A	A	0 / 1	1–5	17%
Europe/Africa Zone	A	F	W	A	A	A	A	A	A	1 / 2	11–2	85%
WTA 1000 + former^{†} tournaments
Indian Wells Open	A	A	2R	3R	1R	3R	A	1R	A	0 / 5	4–5	44%
Miami Open	A	A	4R	F	4R	4R	A	1R	1R	0 / 6	12–6	67%
Berlin Open	A	A	QF	SF	1R	2R	A	A	A	0 / 4	7–4	64%
Italian Open	A	A	2R	QF	3R	A	A	3R	A	0 / 4	8–4	67%
Canadian Open	Q2	A	A	3R	A	3R	A	2R	A	0 / 3	5–3	63%
Pan Pacific Open^{†}	A	A	A	A	QF	QF	SF	SF	A	0 / 4	9–4	69%
Charleston Open^{†}	A	A	A	A	F	3R	A	1R	1R	0 / 4	5–4	56%
Kremlin Cup^{†}	NH/NMS		A	1R	A	F	1R	2R (Note: Withdraw during the tournament. Not counted as a loss.)	A	0 / 4	4–3	57%
Zurich Open^{†}	A	2R	A	1R	A	QF	1R	A	A	0 / 4	2–4	33%
Win–loss	0–0	1–1	8–4	16–7	10–6	12–8	2–3	7–6	0–2	0 / 38	56–37	60%
Career statistics
	1995	1996	1997	1998	1999	2000	2001	2002	2003	SR	W–L	Win%
Year-end ranking	289	55	26	13	12	8	74	35	305			

=== Doubles ===
Tournament	1995	1996	1997	1998	1999	2000	2001	2002	2003	SR	W–L
Grand Slam tournaments
Australian Open	A	A	1R	2R	W	SF	QF	W	3R	2 / 7	22–5
French Open	A	A	3R	SF	F	3R	A	A	A	0 / 4	13–4
Wimbledon	A	A	2R	A	A	SF	A	SF	A	0 / 3	9–3
US Open	A	QF	3R	2R	A	2R	A	QF	A	0 / 5	10–5
Win–loss	0–0	3–1	5–4	6–3	11–1	11–4	3–1	13–2	2–1	2 / 19	54–17
Year-end championship
WTA Finals	A	A	A	QF	W	W	A	A	A	2 / 3	6–1
WTA 1000 + former^{†} tournaments
Indian Wells Open	not Tier I		QF	QF	W	F	A	A	A	1 / 4	12–3
Miami Open	A	A	1R	QF	SF	2R	A	QF	1R	0 / 6	6–5
Berlin Open	A	A	QF	SF	A	A	A	A	A	0 / 2	5–2
Italian Open	A	A	SF	2R	W	A	A	A	A	1 / 3	7–2
Canadian Open	A	A	A	1R	A	QF	A	1R	A	0 / 3	2–2
Pan Pacific Open^{†}	A	A	A	A	QF	1R	F	A	A	0 / 3	4–3
Charleston Open^{†}	A	A	A	A	QF	QF	A	A	A	0 / 2	3–2
Kremlin Cup^{†}	NH	NTI	A	A	A	F	W	QF	A	1 / 4	9–3
Zurich Open^{†}	A	1R	A	QF	A	W	A	A	A	1 / 3	5–2
Career statistics
Year-end ranking	—N/a	70	40	10	1	4	26	11	176		

== Significant finals ==
=== Grand Slams ===
==== Doubles: 3 (2 titles, 1 runner-up) ====
Result	Year	Championship	Surface	Partner	Opponents	Score
Win	1999	Australian Open	Hard	(Switzerland) Martina Hingis	(United States) Lindsay Davenport; Natasha Zvereva	7–5, 6–3
Loss	1999	French Open	Clay	(Switzerland) Martina Hingis	(United States) Serena Williams (United States) Venus Williams	3–6, 7–6^{(7–2)}, 6–8
Win	2002	Australian Open (2)	Hard	(Switzerland) Martina Hingis	(Slovakia) Daniela Hantuchová (Spain) Arantxa Sánchez Vicario	6–2, 6–7^{(4–7)}, 6–1

==== Mixed doubles: 2 runner-ups ====
Result	Year	Championship	Surface	Partner	Opponents	Score
Loss	1999	Wimbledon	Grass	(Sweden) Jonas Björkman	(India) Leander Paes (United States) Lisa Raymond	4–6, 6–3, 3–6
Loss	2000	US Open	Hard	(Belarus) Max Mirnyi	(United States) Jared Palmer (Spain) Arantxa Sánchez Vicario	4–6, 3–6

=== WTA Finals ===
==== Doubles: 2 titles ====
Result	Year	Championship	Surface	Partner	Opponents	Score
Win	1999	New York City	Carpet	(Switzerland) Martina Hingis	(Latvia) Larisa Neiland (Spain) Arantxa Sánchez Vicario	6–4, 6–4
Win	2000	New York City (2)	Carpet	(Switzerland) Martina Hingis	(United States) Nicole Arendt (Netherlands) Manon Bollegraf	6–2, 6–3

=== WTA 1000 ===
==== Singles: 3 runner-ups ====
Result	Date	Tournament	Surface	Opponent	Score
Loss	Mar 1998	Miami, US	Hard	(United States) Venus Williams	6–2, 4–6, 1–6
Loss	Apr 1999	Hilton Head, US	Clay	(Switzerland) Martina Hingis	4–6, 3–6
Loss	Oct 2000	Moscow	Carpet	(Switzerland) Martina Hingis	3–6, 1–6

==== Doubles: 7 (4 titles, 3 runner-ups) ====
Result	Year	Tournament	Surface	Partner	Opponents	Score
Win	1999	Indian Wells, US	Hard	(Switzerland) Martina Hingis	(United States) Mary Joe Fernández (Czech Republic) Jana Novotná	6–2, 6–2
Win	1999	Rome, Italy	Clay	(Switzerland) Martina Hingis	(France) Alexandra Fusai (France) Nathalie Tauziat	6–2, 6–2
Loss	2000	Indian Wells, US	Hard	(Belarus) Natasha Zvereva	(United States) Lindsay Davenport (United States) Corina Morariu	6–3, 6–2
Loss	2000	Moscow, Russia	Carpet	(Switzerland) Martina Hingis	(France) Julie Halard-Decugis (Japan) Ai Sugiyama	4–6, 6–4, 7–6^{(7–5)}
Win	2000	Zürich, Switzerland	Carpet	(Switzerland) Martina Hingis	(United States) Kimberly Po (France) Anne-Gaëlle Sidot	6–3, 6–4
Loss	2001	Tokyo, Japan	Hard	(Uzbekistan) Iroda Tulyaganova	(United States) Lisa Raymond (Australia) Rennae Stubbs	7–6^{(7–5)}, 6–2, 7–6^{(8–6)}
Win	2001	Moscow, Russia	Carpet	(Switzerland) Martina Hingis	(Russia) Elena Dementieva (Russia) Lina Krasnoroutskaya	7–6^{(7–1)}, 6–3

== WTA Tour finals ==
=== Singles: 4 runner-ups ===
Legend
WTA 1000 (Tier I) (0–3)
WTA 250 (Tier IV) (0–1)

Result	W–L	Date	Tournament	Tier	Surface	Opponent	Score
Loss	0–1	Mar 1998	Miami Open, United States	Tier I	Hard	(United States) Venus Williams	6–2, 4–6, 1–6
Loss	0–2	Apr 1999	Charleston Open, United States	Tier I	Clay	(Switzerland) Martina Hingis	4–6, 3–6
Loss	0–3	Oct 2000	Kremlin Cup, Russia	Tier I	Carpet	(Switzerland) Martina Hingis	3–6, 1–6
Loss	0–4	Sep 2002	China Open, China	Tier IV	Hard	(Israel) Anna Smashnova	2–6, 3–6

=== Doubles: 28 (16 titles, 12 runner-ups) ===
Legend Grand Slam tournaments (2–1) Finals (2–0) WTA 1000 (Tier I) (4–3) WTA 500 (Tier II) (6–7) WTA 250 (Tier III / Tier IV) (2–1)	Titles by surface Hard (8–8) Clay (2–1) Grass (1–0) Carpet (5–3)	Titles by setting Outdoor (10–9) Indoor (6–3)

Result	W–L	Date	Tournament	Tier	Surface	Partner	Opponents	Score
Loss	0–1	Sep 1995	Moscow Ladies Open, Russia	Tier III	Carpet (i)	(Poland) Aleksandra Olsza	(United States) Meredith McGrath (Latvia) Larisa Savchenko-Neiland	0–6, 1–6
Loss	0–2	Feb 1998	Open Gaz de France	Tier II	Hard	(Latvia) Larisa Neiland	(Belgium) Sabine Appelmans (Netherlands) Miriam Oremans	6–1, 3–6, 7–6^{(7–3)}
Loss	0–3	Mar 1998	Generali Ladies Linz	Tier II	Hard	(Latvia) Larisa Neiland	(France) Alexandra Fusai (France) Nathalie Tauziat	3–6, 6–3, 4–6
Win	1–3	Sep 1998	Toyota Princess Cup	Tier II	Hard	(United States) Monica Seles	(United States) Mary Joe Fernández (Spain) Arantxa Sánchez Vicario	6–4, 6–4
Loss	1–4	Oct 1998	Porsche Tennis Grand Prix	Tier II	Hard	(Spain) Arantxa Sánchez Vicario	(United States) Lindsay Davenport (Belarus) Natasha Zvereva	4–6, 2–6
Win	2–4	Jan 1999	Australian Open	Grand Slam	Hard	(Switzerland) Martina Hingis	(United States) Lindsay Davenport (Belarus) Natasha Zvereva	7–5, 6–3
Win	3–4	Mar 1999	Pacific Life Open	Tier I	Hard	(Switzerland) Martina Hingis	(United States) Mary Joe Fernández (Czech Republic) Jana Novotná	6–2, 6–2
Win	4–4	May 1999	Internazionali BNL d'Italia	Tier I	Clay	(Switzerland) Martina Hingis	(France) Alexandra Fusai (France) Nathalie Tauziat	6–2, 6–2
Loss	4–5	Jun 1999	French Open	Grand Slam	Clay	(Switzerland) Martina Hingis	(United States) Serena Williams (United States) Venus Williams	3–6, 7–6^{(7–2)}, 6–8
Win	5–5	Jun 1999	International Women's Open	Tier II	Grass	(Switzerland) Martina Hingis	(Czech Republic) Jana Novotná (Belarus) Natasha Zvereva	6–4, retired
Loss	5–6	Aug 1999	Bank of the West Classic	Tier II	Hard	(Russia) Elena Likhovtseva	(United States) Lindsay Davenport (United States) Corina Morariu	4–6, 4–6
Win	6–6	Nov 1999	WTA Tour Championships	Finals	Carpet (i)	(Switzerland) Martina Hingis	(Latvia) Larisa Neiland (Spain) Arantxa Sánchez Vicario	6–4, 6–4
Win	7–6	Jan 2000	MAW Hardcourts	Tier III	Hard	(France) Julie Halard	(Belgium) Sabine Appelmans (Italy) Rita Grande	6–3, 6–0
Loss	7–7	Mar 2000	Pacific Life Open	Tier I	Hard	(Belarus) Natasha Zvereva	(United States) Lindsay Davenport (United States) Corina Morariu	2–6, 3–6
Win	8–7	May 2000	Hamburg Masters	Tier II	Clay	(Belarus) Natasha Zvereva	(United States) Nicole Arendt (Netherlands) Manon Bollegraf	6–7^{(5–7)}, 6–2, 6–4
Loss	8–8	Aug 2000	Acura Classic	Tier II	Hard	(United States) Lindsay Davenport	(United States) Lisa Raymond (Australia) Rennae Stubbs	6–4, 3–6, 6–7^{(6–8)}
Win	9–8	Oct 2000	Porsche Tennis Grand Prix	Tier II	Hard (i)	(Switzerland) Martina Hingis	(Spain) Arantxa Sánchez Vicario (Austria) Barbara Schett	6–4, 6–2
Win	10–8	Oct 2000	Zürich Open	Tier I	Carpet (i)	(Switzerland) Martina Hingis	(United States) Kimberly Po (France) Anne-Gaëlle Sidot	6–3, 6–4
Loss	10–9	Oct 2000	Kremlin Cup	Tier I	Carpet (i)	(Switzerland) Martina Hingis	(France) Julie Halard-Decugis (Japan) Ai Sugiyama	6–4, 4–6, 6–7^{(5–7)}
Win	11–9	Nov 2000	Advanta Championships Philadelphia	Tier II	Carpet (i)	(Switzerland) Martina Hingis	(United States) Lisa Raymond (Australia) Rennae Stubbs	6–2, 7–5
Win	12–9	Nov 2000	WTA Tour Championships	Finals	Carpet (i)	(Switzerland) Martina Hingis	(United States) Nicole Arendt (Netherlands) Manon Bollegraf	6–2, 6–3
Win	13–9	Jan 2001	Medibank International Sydney	Tier II	Hard	(Austria) Barbara Schett	(United States) Lisa Raymond (Australia) Rennae Stubbs	6–2, 7–5
Loss	13–10	Feb 2001	Toray Pan Pacific Open	Tier I	Carpet (i)	(Uzbekistan) Iroda Tulyaganova	(United States) Lisa Raymond (Australia) Rennae Stubbs	6–7^{(5–7)}, 6–2, 6–7^{(6–8)}
Loss	13–11	Aug 2001	Acura Classic	Tier II	Hard	(Switzerland) Martina Hingis	(Zimbabwe) Cara Black (Russia) Elena Likhovtseva	4–6, 6–1, 4–6
Win	14–11	Oct 2001	Kremlin Cup	Tier I	Carpet (i)	(Switzerland) Martina Hingis	(Russia) Elena Dementieva (Russia) Lina Krasnoroutskaya	7–6^{(7–1)}, 6–3
Loss	14–12	Jan 2002	Medibank International Sydney	Tier II	Hard	(Switzerland) Martina Hingis	(United States) Lisa Raymond (Australia) Rennae Stubbs	Withdraw
Win	15–12	Jan 2002	Australian Open	Grand Slam	Hard	(Switzerland) Martina Hingis	(Slovakia) Daniela Hantuchová (Spain) Arantxa Sánchez Vicario	6–2, 6–7^{(4–7)}, 6–1
Win	16–12	Sep 2002	China Open	Tier IV	Hard	(Chinese Taipei) Janet Lee	(Japan) Ai Sugiyama (Japan) Rika Fujiwara	7–5, 6–3

== ITF Circuit finals ==
=== Singles: 2 titles ===
Legend
$50,000 tournaments
$25,000 tournaments

Result	W–L	Date	Tournament	Tier	Surface	Opponent	Score
Win	1–0	Feb 1996	Midland, United States	50,000	Hard	(United States) Lindsay Lee-Waters	7–6^{(2)}, 6–1
Win	2–0	Mar 1996	Rockford, United States	25,000	Hard	(Japan) Yuka Yoshida	6–1, 6–4

=== Doubles 1 runner-up ===
Legend
$25,000 tournaments

Result	W–L	Date	Tournament	Tier	Surface	Partner	Opponents	Score
Loss	0–1	Mar 1996	Rockford, United States	25,000	Hard	(Czech Republic) Ludmila Varmužová	(United States) Elly Hakami (United Kingdom) Valda Lake	2–6, 3–6

== WTA Tour career earnings ==
Year	Grand Slam titles (Note: Includes singles, doubles and mixed doubles titles.)	WTA titles	Total titles	Earnings ($)	Money list rank
1995-06	0	0	0	169,131	n/a
1997	0	0	0	292,362	28
1998	0	0	0	568,771	13
1999	0	0	0	748,424	10
2000	0	0	0	984,930	8
2001	0	0	0	305,409	30
2002	0	0	0	515,635	22
Career	0	0	0	3,584,662	76
