= 1999 Evert Cup – Singles =

Singles
- 1999 Newsweek Champions Cup and the Evert Cup

Final
- Champion: (United States) Serena Williams
- Runner-up: (Germany) Steffi Graf
- Score: 6–3, 3–6, 7–5

Details
- Draw: 56
- Seeds: 16

Events
Singles	men	women
Doubles	men	women
← 1998 ·	Newsweek Champions Cup	· 2000 →
← 1998 ·	Evert Cup	· 2000 →

Serena Williams defeated Steffi Graf in the final, 6–3, 3–6, 7–5 to win the women's singles tennis title at the 1999 Indian Wells Open. It was the second and last time that the two would contest a professional match.

Martina Hingis was the defending champion, but lost in the quarterfinals to Chanda Rubin.

== Seeds ==
The top eight seeds received a bye to the second round.

1. (Switzerland) Martina Hingis (quarterfinals)
2. (United States) Lindsay Davenport (second round)
3. (United States) Monica Seles (third round)
4. (Czech Republic) Jana Novotná (quarterfinals)
5. (Germany) Steffi Graf (final)
6. (France) Mary Pierce (quarterfinals)
7. (South Africa) Amanda Coetzer (third round)
8. (France) Nathalie Tauziat (third round)
9. (Russia) Anna Kournikova (first round)
10. (Switzerland) Patty Schnyder (third round)
11. (Belgium) Dominique Van Roost (first round)
12. (France) Sandrine Testud (semifinals)
13. (Romania) Irina Spîrlea (second round)
14. (Spain) Conchita Martínez (second round)
15. (Belarus) Natasha Zvereva (first round)
16. (Austria) Barbara Schett (first round)

== Draw ==
=== Key ===
- Q = Qualifier
- WC = Wild card
- LL = Lucky loser
- Alt = Alternate
- SE = Special exempt
- PR = Protected ranking
- ITF = ITF entry
- JE = Junior exempt
- w/o = Walkover
- r = Retired
- d = Defaulted
- SR = Special ranking

=== Finals ===
Quarterfinals
1	(Switzerland) Martina Hingis	3	6^{2}
(United States) Chanda Rubin	6	7^{7}
4	(Czech Republic) Jana Novotná	2	0
5	(Germany) Steffi Graf	6	6
12	(France) Sandrine Testud	6	6
(Slovakia) Henrieta Nagyová	1	3
6	(France) Mary Pierce	5	6^{1}
(United States) Serena Williams	7	7^{7}

Semifinals
(United States) Chanda Rubin	6	4	2
5	(Germany) Steffi Graf	2	6	6
12	(France) Sandrine Testud	5	0
(United States) Serena Williams	7	6

Final
5	(Germany) Steffi Graf	3	6	5
(United States) Serena Williams	6	3	7

=== Top half ===
==== Section 1 ====
First round
WC	(United States) A Stevenson	7	6
(United States) T Snyder	5	4
Q	(Australia) A Molik	6	6
(France) A Fusai	2	3
(Thailand) T Tanasugarn	3	4
10	(Switzerland) P Schnyder	6	6
14	(Spain) C Martínez	6	4	6
(Belgium) S Appelmans	2	6	2
(United States) C Rubin	6	6
(Romania) R Dragomir	4	3
(China) Li F	2	6^{4}
(France) J Halard-Decugis	6	7^{7}

Second round
1	(Switzerland) M Hingis	6	6
WC	(United States) A Stevenson	3	4
Q	(Australia) A Molik	6	1	3
10	(Switzerland) P Schnyder	3	6	6
14	(Spain) C Martínez	3	4
(United States) C Rubin	6	6
(France) J Halard-Decugis	4	7^{8}	6^{3}
7	(South Africa) A Coetzer	6	6^{6}	7^{7}

Third round
1	(Switzerland) M Hingis	6	6
10	(Switzerland) P Schnyder	1	3
(United States) C Rubin	6	6
7	(South Africa) A Coetzer	4	4

Quarterfinals
1	(Switzerland) M Hingis	3	6^{2}
(United States) C Rubin	6	7^{7}

==== Section 2 ====
First round
WC	(United States) MJ Fernández	6	6
(Ukraine) E Tatarkova	4	3
(Austria) S Plischke	4	2
Q	(United States) B Rippner	6	6
Q	(Germany) B Rittner	0	6	6
11	(Belgium) D Van Roost	6	4	3
15	(Belarus) N Zvereva	4	4
(United States) L Raymond	6	6
(Japan) A Sugiyama	2	6	7
(France) A-G Sidot	6	2	5
Q	(Russia) T Panova	4	1
(Czech Republic) K Hrdličková	6	6

Second round
4	(Czech Republic) J Novotná	6	6
WC	(United States) MJ Fernández	0	3
Q	(United States) B Rippner	6	6
Q	(Germany) B Rittner	4	4
(United States) L Raymond	6^{6}	5
(Japan) A Sugiyama	7^{8}	7
(Czech Republic) K Hrdličková	1	2
5	(Germany) S Graf	6	6

Third round
4	(Czech Republic) J Novotná	6	6
Q	(United States) B Rippner	1	4
(Japan) A Sugiyama	0	1
5	(Germany) S Graf	6	6

Quarterfinals
4	(Czech Republic) J Novotná	2	0
5	(Germany) S Graf	6	6

=== Bottom half ===
==== Section 3 ====
First round
(Spain) M Serna	6	6^{5}	2
Q	(Japan) M Saeki	4	7^{7}	6
WC	(Belarus) O Barabanschikova	5	6	6
(Israel) A Smashnova	7	1	2
(Venezuela) M Vento	1	1
12	(France) S Testud	6	6
9	(Russia) A Kournikova	6^{3}	6	5
(Italy) S Farina	7^{7}	1	7
(Slovakia) H Nagyová	7	7
(United States) C Morariu	5	5
(Russia) E Likhovtseva	6	6
(Croatia) M Lučić	4	3

Second round
8	(France) N Tauziat	6	6^{3}	6
Q	(Japan) M Saeki	1	7^{7}	3
WC	(Belarus) O Barabanschikova	6^{3}	0
12	(France) S Testud	7^{7}	6
(Italy) S Farina	2	4
(Slovakia) H Nagyová	6	6
(Russia) E Likhovtseva	6^{2}	2
3	(United States) M Seles	7^{7}	6

Third round
8	(France) N Tauziat	6^{3}	2
12	(France) S Testud	7^{7}	6
(Slovakia) H Nagyová	6	6
3	(United States) M Seles	2	4

Quarterfinals
12	(France) S Testud	6	6
(Slovakia) H Nagyová	1	3

==== Section 4 ====
First round
(United States) A Frazier	4	6	6
Q	(Spain) M Sánchez Lorenzo	6	3	2
(South Africa) M de Swardt	7	4	6^{3}
(Italy) R Grande	5	6	7^{7}
WC	(United States) L Osterloh	6	6
16	(Austria) B Schett	4	4
13	(Romania) I Spîrlea	7^{7}	7^{7}
Q	(Germany) A Glass	6^{3}	6^{4}
(Zimbabwe) C Black	4	6	6
(Germany) A Huber	6	3	2
(United States) S Williams	6	7
Q	(South Africa) J Steck	1	5

Second round
6	(France) M Pierce	6	6
(United States) A Frazier	0	3
(Italy) R Grande	6	6
WC	(United States) L Osterloh	4	4
13	(Romania) I Spîrlea	7^{7}	4	5
(Zimbabwe) C Black	6^{4}	6	7
(United States) S Williams	6	6
2	(United States) L Davenport	4	2

Third round
6	(France) M Pierce	6	6
(Italy) R Grande	1	0
(Zimbabwe) C Black	0	5
(United States) S Williams	6	7

Quarterfinals
6	(France) M Pierce	5	6^{1}
(United States) S Williams	7	7^{7}

== Qualifying ==
=== Seeds ===
1. (Spain) María Sánchez Lorenzo (Qualifier)
2. (France) Alexia Dechaume-Balleret (qualifying competition)
3. (Germany) Barbara Rittner (Qualifier)
4. (United States) Kimberly Po (first round)
5. (Puerto Rico) Kristina Brandi (qualifying competition)
6. (Romania) Cătălina Cristea (qualifying competition)
7. (Germany) Andrea Glass (Qualifier)
8. (United States) Meghann Shaughnessy (qualifying competition)

=== Qualifiers ===
1. (Spain) María Sánchez Lorenzo
2. (Australia) Alicia Molik
3. (United States) Brie Rippner
4. (South Africa) Jessica Steck
5. (Germany) Andrea Glass
6. (Germany) Barbara Rittner
7. (Japan) Miho Saeki
8. (Russia) Tatiana Panova

== Qualifying draw ==
=== Key ===
- Q = Qualifier
- WC = Wild card
- LL = Lucky loser
- Alt = Alternate
- SE = Special exempt
- PR = Protected ranking
- ITF = ITF entry
- JE = Junior exempt
- w/o = Walkover
- r = Retired
- d = Defaulted
- SR = Special ranking

=== First qualifier ===
First round
1	(Spain) María Sánchez Lorenzo	6	6
(Netherlands) Kristie Boogert	4	3
(Australia) Nicole Pratt	6	6
(Argentina) Mariana Díaz Oliva	2	1

Qualifying competition
1	(Spain) María Sánchez Lorenzo	6	6
(Australia) Nicole Pratt	4	4

=== Second qualifier ===
First round
(Italy) Tathiana Garbin	1	6	2
(Australia) Alicia Molik	6	3	6
(United States) Jane Chi	6	4	5
8	(United States) Meghann Shaughnessy	3	6	7

Qualifying competition
(Australia) Alicia Molik	6	6
8	(United States) Meghann Shaughnessy	4	0

=== Third qualifier ===
First round
4	(United States) Kimberly Po	3	5
(United States) Brie Rippner	6	7
(Germany) Elena Wagner	3	6	2
(Croatia) Silvija Talaja	6	2	6

Qualifying competition
(United States) Brie Rippner	4	7^{8}	6
(Croatia) Silvija Talaja	6	6^{6}	2

=== Fourth qualifier ===
First round
(Canada) Maureen Drake	7	2	1
WC	(South Africa) Jessica Steck	5	6	6
(Poland) Aleksandra Olsza	5	0
5	(Puerto Rico) Kristina Brandi	7	6

Qualifying competition
WC	(South Africa) Jessica Steck	7	6
5	(Puerto Rico) Kristina Brandi	5	3

=== Fifth qualifier ===
First round
7	(Germany) Andrea Glass	6	6
WC	(United States) Brandis Braverman	3	1
(United States) Sandra Cacic	5	3
(Canada) Jana Nejedly	7	6

Qualifying competition
7	(Germany) Andrea Glass	7	7
(Canada) Jana Nejedly	5	5

=== Sixth qualifier ===
First round
(United States) Samantha Reeves	7	6
WC	(United States) Sarah Taylor	5	0
(Belgium) Els Callens	2	5
3	(Germany) Barbara Rittner	6	7

Qualifying competition
(United States) Samantha Reeves	3	6^{4}
3	(Germany) Barbara Rittner	6	7^{7}

=== Seventh qualifier ===
First round
6	(Romania) Cătălina Cristea	1	6	6
(Chinese Taipei) Janet Lee	6	2	4
(Japan) Miho Saeki	6	6
(Bulgaria) Pavlina Stoyanova	1	2

Qualifying competition
6	(Romania) Cătălina Cristea	2	3
(Japan) Miho Saeki	6	6

=== Eighth qualifier ===
First round
(United States) Jolene Watanabe	0	3
(Russia) Tatiana Panova	6	6
WC	(United States) Katie Schlukebir	2	0
2	(France) Alexia Dechaume-Balleret	6	6

Qualifying competition
(Russia) Tatiana Panova	6	6
2	(France) Alexia Dechaume-Balleret	4	3
