= 1999 Evert Cup – Doubles =

Doubles
- 1999 Newsweek Champions Cup and the Evert Cup

Final
- Champions: (Switzerland) Martina Hingis (Russia) Anna Kournikova
- Runners-up: (United States) Mary Joe Fernández (Czech Republic) Jana Novotná
- Score: 6–2, 6–2

Details
- Draw: 28
- Seeds: 8

Events
Singles	men	women
Doubles	men	women
← 1998 ·	Newsweek Champions Cup	· 2000 →
← 1998 ·	Evert Cup	· 2000 →

The 1999 Evert Cup doubles was the doubles event of the eleventh edition of the tennis tournament played at Indian Wells, California, United States. It was the second WTA Tier I tournament of the year, and part of the US Spring tennis season. Lindsay Davenport and Natasha Zvereva were the defending champions but lost in the quarterfinals to Serena Williams and Venus Williams.

Martina Hingis and Anna Kournikova won in the final 6–2, 6–2 against Mary Joe Fernández and Jana Novotná.

== Seeds ==
The top four seeded teams received byes into the second round.

1. (United States) Lindsay Davenport / (Belarus) Natasha Zvereva (quarterfinals)
2. (Switzerland) Martina Hingis / (Russia) Anna Kournikova (champions)
3. (United States) Lisa Raymond / (Australia) Rennae Stubbs (quarterfinals)
4. (France) Alexandra Fusai / (France) Nathalie Tauziat (second round)
5. (Russia) Elena Likhovtseva / (Japan) Ai Sugiyama (quarterfinals)
6. (South Africa) Mariaan de Swardt / (Ukraine) Elena Tatarkova (first round)
7. (Spain) Conchita Martínez / (Argentina) Patricia Tarabini (semifinals)
8. (Romania) Irina Spîrlea / (Netherlands) Caroline Vis (first round)

== Draw ==
=== Key ===
- Q = Qualifier
- WC = Wild card
- LL = Lucky loser
- Alt = Alternate
- ITF = ITF entry
- PR = Protected ranking
- SR = Special ranking
- SE = Special exempt
- JE = Junior exempt
- JR = Junior Accelerator Programme entrant
- CO = College Accelerator Programme entrant
- NG = Next Gen Accelerator Program entrant
- w/o = Walkover
- r = Retired
- d = Defaulted

=== Finals ===
Semifinals

Final

- (United States) Serena Williams
- (United States) Venus Williams
3
4

- (United States) Mary Joe Fernández
- (Czech Republic) Jana Novotná
6
6

- (United States) Mary Joe Fernández
- (Czech Republic) Jana Novotná
2
2

2
- (Switzerland) Martina Hingis
- (Russia) Anna Kournikova
6
6

7
- (Spain) Conchita Martínez
- (Argentina) Patricia Tarabini
1
0

2
- (Switzerland) Martina Hingis
- (Russia) Anna Kournikova
6
6

=== Top half ===
First round

Second round

Quarterfinals

Semifinals

1
- (United States) L Davenport
- (Belarus) N Zvereva
6
6

- (United States) C Rubin
- (France) S Testud
3
6
6

- (United States) C Rubin
- (France) S Testud
2
4

- (Romania) C Cristea
- (Romania) R Dragomir
6
2
4

1
- (United States) L Davenport
- (Belarus) N Zvereva
6
2
3

- (United States) S Williams
- (United States) V Williams
6
6

- (United States) S Williams
- (United States) V Williams
4
6
6

- (United States) K Adams
- (United States) D Graham
0
1

- (United States) S Williams
- (United States) V Williams
4
6
6

- (Italy) S Farina
- (United States) L Wild
6
5
6

- (Italy) S Farina
- (United States) L Wild
6
4
2

6
- (South Africa) M de Swardt
- (Ukraine) E Tatarkova
3
7
4

- (United States) S Williams
- (United States) V Williams
3
4

- (United States) M J Fernández
- (Czech Republic) J Novotná
6
6

3
- (United States) L Raymond
- (Australia) R Stubbs
6
6

- (Belgium) S Appelmans
- (Zimbabwe) C Black
3
6
6

- (Belgium) S Appelmans
- (Zimbabwe) C Black
3
4

WC
- (Belarus) O Barabanschikova
- (Spain) M Serna
6
1
3

3
- (United States) L Raymond
- (Australia) R Stubbs
6
2
3

- (United States) C Morariu
- (United States) M Seles
6
2
2

- (United States) M J Fernández
- (Czech Republic) J Novotná
4
6
6

- (United States) M J Fernández
- (Czech Republic) J Novotná
3
6
6

- (United States) M J Fernández
- (Czech Republic) J Novotná
6
7^{7}

- (Australia) K Kunce
- (United States) K Po
6
7^{7}

- (Australia) K Kunce
- (United States) K Po
3
6^{2}

8
- (Romania) I Spîrlea
- (Netherlands) C Vis
1
6^{5}

=== Bottom half ===
First round

Second round

Quarterfinals

Semifinals

7
- (Spain) C Martínez
- (Argentina) P Tarabini
6
6

- (Croatia) M Lučić
- (France) M Pierce
2
4

7
- (Spain) C Martínez
- (Argentina) P Tarabini
7
6

- (Belgium) E Callens
- (France) J Halard-Decugis
7
7

- (Belgium) E Callens
- (France) J Halard-Decugis
5
4

- (South Africa) N de Villiers
- (South Africa) L Horn
5
5

7
- (Spain) C Martínez
- (Argentina) P Tarabini
6
2
7^{7}

- (United States) E deLone
- (Australia) N Pratt
7
1
2

WC
- (Germany) S Graf
- (Germany) A Huber
4
6
6^{4}

WC
- (Germany) S Graf
- (Germany) A Huber
5
6
6

WC
- (Germany) S Graf
- (Germany) A Huber
6
6

4
- (France) A Fusai
- (France) N Tauziat
2
4

7
- (Spain) C Martínez
- (Argentina) P Tarabini
1
0

5
- (Russia) E Likhovtseva
- (Japan) A Sugiyama
3
6
6

2
- (Switzerland) M Hingis
- (Russia) A Kournikova
6
6

Q
- (Netherlands) K Boogert
- (France) A-G Sidot
6
4
4

5
- (Russia) E Likhovtseva
- (Japan) A Sugiyama
6
6

- (United States) S Cacic
- (Belgium) D Van Roost
2
4

- (United States) A Frazier
- (United States) K Schlukebir
4
4

- (United States) A Frazier
- (United States) K Schlukebir
6
6

5
- (Russia) E Likhovtseva
- (Japan) A Sugiyama
4
2

- (South Africa) A Coetzer
- (South Africa) J Steck
5
7
3

2
- (Switzerland) M Hingis
- (Russia) A Kournikova
6
6

- (Austria) B Schett
- (Switzerland) P Schnyder
7
5
6

- (Austria) B Schett
- (Switzerland) P Schnyder
1
1

2
- (Switzerland) M Hingis
- (Russia) A Kournikova
6
6

== Qualifying ==
=== Seeds ===
1. (Czech Republic) Květa Hrdličková / (Czech Republic) Helena Vildová (first round)
2. (Chinese Taipei) Janet Lee / (Thailand) Tamarine Tanasugarn (second round)

=== Qualifiers ===
1. (Netherlands) Kristie Boogert / (France) Anne-Gaëlle Sidot

== Qualifying draw ==
=== Key ===
- Q = Qualifier
- WC = Wild card
- LL = Lucky loser
- Alt = Alternate
- ITF = ITF entry
- PR = Protected ranking
- SR = Special ranking
- SE = Special exempt
- JE = Junior exempt
- JR = Junior Accelerator Programme entrant
- CO = College Accelerator Programme entrant
- NG = Next Gen Accelerator Program entrant
- w/o = Walkover
- r = Retired
- d = Defaulted

First round

Second round

Qualifying competition

1
- (Czech Republic) Květa Hrdličková
- (Czech Republic) Helena Vildová
6

- (France) Alexia Dechaume-Balleret
- (Germany) Barbara Rittner
8

- (France) Alexia Dechaume-Balleret
- (Germany) Barbara Rittner
1

- (Canada) Maureen Drake
- (Germany) Elena Wagner
8

- (Poland) Aleksandra Olsza
- (United States) Lilia Osterloh
7

- (Canada) Maureen Drake
- (Germany) Elena Wagner
9

- (Canada) Maureen Drake
- (Germany) Elena Wagner
6

- (Netherlands) Kristie Boogert
- (France) Anne-Gaëlle Sidot
8

- (Netherlands) Kristie Boogert
- (France) Anne-Gaëlle Sidot
9

- (Italy) Tathiana Garbin
- (United States) Samantha Reeves
8

- (Netherlands) Kristie Boogert
- (France) Anne-Gaëlle Sidot
8

2
- (Chinese Taipei) Janet Lee
- (Thailand) Tamarine Tanasugarn
2

WC
- (United States) Tara Snyder
- (United States) Alexandra Stevenson
6

2
- (Chinese Taipei) Janet Lee
- (Thailand) Tamarine Tanasugarn
8
