= 1998 Newsweek Champions Cup – Singles =

Singles
- 1998 Newsweek Champions Cup and the State Farm Evert Cup

Final
- Champion: (Chile) Marcelo Ríos
- Runner-up: (United Kingdom) Greg Rusedski
- Score: 6–3, 6–7^{(15–17)}, 7–6^{(7–4)}, 6–4

Details
- Draw: 56
- Seeds: 16

Events
Singles	men	women
Doubles	men	women
← 1997 ·	Newsweek Champions Cup	· 1999 →
← 1997 ·	State Farm Evert Cup	· 1999 →

Marcelo Ríos defeated Greg Rusedski in the final, 6–3, 6–7^{(15–17)}, 7–6^{(7–4)}, 6–4 to win the men's singles tennis title at the 1998 Indian Wells Masters.

Michael Chang was the two-time reigning champion, but had to withdraw from the tournament after he suffered a knee injury. This injury occurred after a bizarre incident where sprinklers had accidentally sprayed water onto the court that Chang was practising on, causing Chang to slip and tear his left knee.

== Seeds ==
The top eight seeds received a bye into the second round.

1. (United States) Pete Sampras (third round)
2. (Czech Republic) Petr Korda (quarterfinals)
3. (Australia) Patrick Rafter (third round)
4. (Russia) Yevgeny Kafelnikov (second round)
5. (Sweden) Jonas Björkman (second round)
6. (United Kingdom) Greg Rusedski (final)
7. (Chile) Marcelo Ríos (champion)
8. (United States) ~~Michael Chang~~ (withdrew)
9. (Spain) Álex Corretja (first round)
10. (Brazil) Gustavo Kuerten (first round)
11. (Slovakia) Karol Kučera (second round)
12. (Australia) Mark Philippoussis (first round)
13. (Spain) Félix Mantilla (first round)
14. (Spain) Sergi Bruguera (second round)
15. (France) Cédric Pioline (second round)
16. (Spain) Alberto Berasategui (first round, retired)

== Draw ==
=== Key ===
- Q = Qualifier
- WC = Wild card
- LL = Lucky loser
- Alt = Alternate
- SE = Special exempt
- PR = Protected ranking
- ITF = ITF entry
- JE = Junior exempt
- w/o = Walkover
- r = Retired
- d = Defaulted
- SR = Special ranking

=== Finals ===
Quarterfinals
(Austria) Thomas Muster	5	6	6
(Ukraine) Andrei Medvedev	7	3	4
(Sweden) Thomas Enqvist	6	6^{1}	4
6	(United Kingdom) Greg Rusedski	2	7^{7}	6
WC	(United States) Jan-Michael Gambill	7^{8}	3	6
WC	(United States) Andre Agassi	6^{6}	6	3
7	(Chile) Marcelo Ríos	6	6
2	(Czech Republic) Petr Korda	4	2

Semifinals
(Austria) Thomas Muster	6^{5}	1
6	(United Kingdom) Greg Rusedski	7^{7}	6
WC	(United States) Jan-Michael Gambill	6^{3}	3
7	(Chile) Marcelo Ríos	7^{7}	6

Final
6	(United Kingdom) Greg Rusedski	3	7^{17}	6^{4}	4
7	(Chile) Marcelo Ríos	6	6^{15}	7^{7}	6

=== Top half ===
==== Section 1 ====
First round
(Sweden) M Larsson	7	4	5
(United States) T Martin	5	6	7
(Austria) T Muster	6	6
(United States) C Woodruff	4	4
(Switzerland) M Rosset	3	4
15	(France) C Pioline	6	6
9	(Spain) Á Corretja	5	3
(Sweden) M Norman	7	6
(Ukraine) A Medvedev	7^{8}	2	7^{10}
(Croatia) G Ivanišević	6^{6}	6	6^{8}
(United Kingdom) T Henman	3	4
Q	(Zimbabwe) W Black	6	6

Second round
1	(United States) P Sampras	6	7
(United States) T Martin	1	5
(Austria) T Muster	4	6	6
15	(France) C Pioline	6	3	4
(Sweden) M Norman	7^{8}	1	2
(Ukraine) A Medvedev	6^{6}	6	6
Q	(Zimbabwe) W Black	6	3	0
LL	(Ecuador) N Lapentti	1	6	6

Third round
1	(United States) P Sampras	5	3
(Austria) T Muster	7	6
(Ukraine) A Medvedev	6	6
LL	(Ecuador) N Lapentti	1	4

Quarterfinals
(Austria) T Muster	5	6	6
(Ukraine) A Medvedev	7	3	4

==== Section 2 ====
First round
(Czech Republic) B Ulihrach	6	6
(Uruguay) M Filippini	4	0
WC	(United States) R Reneberg	3	1
(Sweden) T Enqvist	6	6
(Spain) Á Costa	4	6	6
13	(Spain) F Mantilla	6	4	3
11	(Slovakia) K Kučera	6	1	7^{7}
(Slovakia) D Hrbatý	4	6	6^{5}
Q	(South Africa) G Stafford	4	3
(Spain) C Moyà	6	6
Q	(United States) V Spadea	6	6
Q	(Spain) J A Viloca	4	1

Second round
4	(Russia) Y Kafelnikov	3	3
(Czech Republic) B Ulihrach	6	6
(Sweden) T Enqvist	6	6
(Spain) Á Costa	4	3
11	(Slovakia) K Kučera	6^{4}	4
(Spain) C Moyà	7^{7}	6
Q	(United States) V Spadea	6	3	4
6	(United Kingdom) G Rusedski	4	6	6

Third round
(Czech Republic) B Ulihrach	2	6^{2}
(Sweden) T Enqvist	6	7^{7}
(Spain) C Moyà	3	5
6	(United Kingdom) G Rusedski	6	7

Quarterfinals
(Sweden) T Enqvist	6	6^{1}	4
6	(United Kingdom) G Rusedski	2	7^{7}	6

=== Bottom half ===
==== Section 3 ====
First round
(United States) J Courier	3	6	6
(France) G Raoux	6	4	3
(Spain) A Portas	1	1
(Spain) F Clavet	6	6
WC	(United States) J-M Gambill	7^{9}	5	7^{8}
12	(Australia) M Philippoussis	6^{7}	7	6^{6}
14	(Spain) S Bruguera	7^{7}	6
(Spain) J Alonso	6^{0}	3
(Australia) T Woodbridge	6^{3}	4
WC	(United States) A Agassi	7^{7}	6
(France) F Santoro	3	6	4
(South Africa) W Ferreira	6	1	6

Second round
5	(Sweden) J Björkman	6	1	6^{4}
(United States) J Courier	4	6	7^{7}
(Spain) F Clavet	3	4
WC	(United States) J-M Gambill	6	6
14	(Spain) S Bruguera	2	4
WC	(United States) A Agassi	6	6
(South Africa) W Ferreira	5	7	4
3	(Australia) P Rafter	7	5	6

Third round
(United States) J Courier	2	4
WC	(United States) J-M Gambill	6	6
WC	(United States) A Agassi	6	3	6
3	(Australia) P Rafter	3	6	2

Quarterfinals
WC	(United States) J-M Gambill	7^{8}	3	6
WC	(United States) A Agassi	6^{6}	6	3

==== Section 4 ====
First round
WC	(Australia) L Hewitt	4	4
Q	(Germany) H Dreekmann	6	6
WC	(United States) M Washington	7^{7}	6
(Australia) M Woodforde	6^{4}	4
(Germany) N Kiefer	6	6^{4}	6
10	(Brazil) G Kuerten	4	7^{7}	2
16	(Spain) A Berasategui	4	0^{r}
(Czech Republic) S Doseděl	6	1
(Australia) J Stoltenberg	3	6	1
(Germany) T Haas	6	3	6
Q	(Italy) A Gaudenzi	4	6	4
Q	(Australia) S Draper	6	4	6

Second round
7	(Chile) M Ríos	6	7^{7}
Q	(Germany) H Dreekmann	4	6^{4}
WC	(United States) M Washington	3	4
(Germany) N Kiefer	6	6
(Czech Republic) S Doseděl	6^{2}	3
(Germany) T Haas	7^{7}	6
Q	(Australia) S Draper	3	6	0
2	(Czech Republic) P Korda	6	3	6

Third round
7	(Chile) M Ríos	6	6
(Germany) N Kiefer	4	3
(Germany) T Haas	6^{6}	2
2	(Czech Republic) P Korda	7^{8}	6

Quarterfinals
7	(Chile) M Ríos	6	6
2	(Czech Republic) P Korda	4	2

== Qualifying ==
=== Seeds ===
1. (Australia) Richard Fromberg (first round)
2. (Spain) Carlos Costa (first round)
3. (Spain) Galo Blanco (first round)
4. (Czech Republic) Daniel Vacek (first round)
5. (Italy) Andrea Gaudenzi (qualified)
6. (Zimbabwe) Byron Black (first round)
7. (Ecuador) Nicolás Lapentti (qualifying competition, lucky loser)
8. (Spain) Javier Sánchez (first round)
9. (United States) Vince Spadea (qualified)
10. (Brazil) Fernando Meligeni (first round)
11. (France) Jérôme Golmard (first round)
12. (South Africa) Grant Stafford (qualified)
13. (Spain) Juan Albert Viloca (qualified)
14. (Australia) Scott Draper (qualified)

=== Qualifiers ===
1. (Spain) Juan Albert Viloca
2. (South Africa) Grant Stafford
3. (Australia) Scott Draper
4. (Germany) Hendrik Dreekmann
5. (Italy) Andrea Gaudenzi
6. (United States) Vince Spadea
7. (Zimbabwe) Wayne Black

=== Lucky loser ===
1. (Ecuador) Nicolás Lapentti

=== Qualifying draw ===
==== First qualifier ====
First round
1	(Australia) Richard Fromberg	6	3
(United States) Alex O'Brien	7	6
WC	(Chile) Nicolás Massú	4	6	5
13	(Spain) Juan Albert Viloca	6	4	7

Qualifying competition
(United States) Alex O'Brien	6	3
13	(Spain) Juan Albert Viloca	7	6

==== Second qualifier ====
First round
2	(Spain) Carlos Costa	3	1
(United States) Jonathan Stark	6	6
WC	(Argentina) Lucas Arnold Ker	4	4
12	(South Africa) Grant Stafford	6	6

Qualifying competition
(United States) Jonathan Stark	4	3
12	(South Africa) Grant Stafford	6	6

==== Third qualifier ====
First round
3	(Spain) Galo Blanco	6	6
(Germany) Oliver Gross	7	7
(Canada) Daniel Nestor	7	3	6
14	(Australia) Scott Draper	6	6	7

Qualifying competition
(Germany) Oliver Gross	4	2
14	(Australia) Scott Draper	6	6

==== Fourth qualifier ====
First round
4	(Czech Republic) Daniel Vacek	4	3
WC	(United States) Michael Joyce	6	6
(Germany) Hendrik Dreekmann	7	6
11	(France) Jérôme Golmard	6	0

Qualifying competition
WC	(United States) Michael Joyce	2	4
(Germany) Hendrik Dreekmann	6	6

==== Fifth qualifier ====
First round
5	(Italy) Andrea Gaudenzi	6	5	6
(Argentina) Franco Squillari	2	7	4
WC	(United States) Jeff Salzenstein	6	7
10	(Brazil) Fernando Meligeni	4	6

Qualifying competition
5	(Italy) Andrea Gaudenzi	7	6	6
WC	(United States) Jeff Salzenstein	5	7	1

==== Sixth qualifier ====
First round
6	(Zimbabwe) Byron Black	3	3
(Australia) Sandon Stolle	6	6
(Norway) Christian Ruud	7	1	4
9	(United States) Vince Spadea	5	6	6

Qualifying competition
(Australia) Sandon Stolle	6	6	2
9	(United States) Vince Spadea	4	7	6

==== Seventh qualifier ====
First round
7	(Ecuador) Nicolás Lapentti	2
(Romania) Dinu Mihail Pescariu	3	r
(Zimbabwe) Wayne Black	5	6	6
8	(Spain) Javier Sánchez	7	4	3

Qualifying competition
7	(Ecuador) Nicolás Lapentti	3	6	5
(Zimbabwe) Wayne Black	6	2	7
