= 1998 State Farm Evert Cup – Doubles =

Doubles
- 1998 Newsweek Champions Cup and the State Farm Evert Cup
- 1997 Champions: (United States) Lindsay Davenport (Belarus) Natasha Zvereva

Final
- Champions: (United States) Lindsay Davenport (Belarus) Natasha Zvereva
- Runners-up: (France) Alexandra Fusai (France) Nathalie Tauziat
- Score: 6–4, 2–6, 6–4

Events
Singles	men	women
Doubles	men	women
← 1997 ·	Newsweek Champions Cup	· 1999 →
← 1997 ·	State Farm Evert Cup	· 1999 →

Lindsay Davenport and Natasha Zvereva were the defending champions and won in the final 6–4, 2–6, 6–4 against Alexandra Fusai and Nathalie Tauziat.

== Seeds ==
Champion seeds are indicated in bold text while text in italics indicates the round in which those seeds were eliminated. The top four seeded teams received byes into the second round.

1. (United States) **Lindsay Davenport** / (Belarus) **Natasha Zvereva (champions)**
2. (France) Alexandra Fusai / (France) Nathalie Tauziat (final)
3. (Indonesia) Yayuk Basuki / (Netherlands) Caroline Vis (semifinals)
4. (Switzerland) Martina Hingis / (Croatia) Mirjana Lučić (semifinals)
5. (Russia) Anna Kournikova / (Latvia) Larisa Neiland (quarterfinals)
6. (Spain) Conchita Martínez / (Argentina) Patricia Tarabini (second round)
7. (Russia) Elena Likhovtseva / (Japan) Ai Sugiyama (quarterfinals)
8. (Japan) Naoko Kijimuta / (Japan) Nana Miyagi (quarterfinals)

== Draw ==
=== Key ===
- Q = Qualifier
- WC = Wild card
- LL = Lucky loser
- Alt = Alternate
- SE = Special exempt
- PR = Protected ranking
- ITF = ITF entry
- JE = Junior exempt
- w/o = Walkover
- r = Retired
- d = Defaulted
- SR = Special ranking

=== Final ===
Final

1
- (United States) **Lindsay Davenport**
- (Belarus) **Natasha Zvereva**
**6**
2
**6**

2
- (France) Alexandra Fusai
- (France) Nathalie Tauziat
4
**6**
4

=== Top half ===
First round

Second round

Quarterfinals

Semifinals

1
- (United States) **L Davenport**
- (Belarus) **N Zvereva**
**6**
4
**6**

- (France) A Dechaume-Balleret
- (France) S Testud
2
4

- (France) J Halard-Decugis
- (Australia) R McQuillan
3
**6**
0

- (France) **J Halard-Decugis**
- (Australia) **R McQuillan**
**6**
**6**

1
- (United States) **L Davenport**
- (Belarus) **N Zvereva**
**6**
**7**

- (United States) **G Helgeson-Nielsen**
- (Chinese Taipei) **J Lee**
**6**
**6**

8
- (Japan) N Kijimuta
- (Japan) N Miyagi
3
6

- (Japan) R Hiraki
- (Argentina) M Paz
3
2

- (United States) G Helgeson-Nielsen
- (Chinese Taipei) J Lee
1
2

- (Netherlands) K Boogert
- (Italy) R Grande
4
4

8
- (Japan) **N Kijimuta**
- (Japan) **N Miyagi**
**6**
**6**

8
- (Japan) **N Kijimuta**
- (Japan) **N Miyagi**
**6**
**6**

1
- (United States) **L Davenport**
- (Belarus) **N Zvereva**
6
**7**
**6**

4
- (Switzerland) M Hingis
- (Croatia) M Lučić
**7**
5
2

4
- (Switzerland) **M Hingis**
- (Croatia) **M Lučić**
**6**
6
**7**

WC
- (Belarus) **O Barabanschikova**
- (Spain) **M Serna**
6
**6**
**6**

WC
- (Belarus) O Barabanschikova
- (Spain) M Serna
3
**7**
5

Q
- (Zimbabwe) C Black
- (United States) L Osterloh
**7**
3
2

4
- (Switzerland) **M Hingis**
- (Croatia) **M Lučić**
**7**
4
**6**

- (United States) **S Williams**
- (United States) **V Williams**
**6**
**6**

- (United States) S Williams
- (United States) V Williams
5
**6**
1

- (Romania) C Cristea
- (Australia) A Ellwood
4
3

- (United States) **S Williams**
- (United States) **V Williams**
**6**
**6**

- (Germany) M Babel
- (Romania) R Dragomir
4
1

5
- (Spain) C Martínez
- (Argentina) P Tarabini
4
1

5
- (Spain) **C Martínez**
- (Argentina) **P Tarabini**
**6**
**6**

=== Bottom half ===
First round

Second round

Quarterfinals

Semifinals

7
- (Russia) **E Likhovtseva**
- (Japan) **A Sugiyama**
**7**
6
**6**

- (Thailand) T Tanasugarn
- (Belgium) D Van Roost
6
**7**
0

7
- (Russia) **E Likhovtseva**
- (Japan) **A Sugiyama**
**7**
**6**

- (United States) **K Adams**
- (Romania) **I Spîrlea**
4
**6**
**6**

- (United States) K Adams
- (Romania) I Spîrlea
5
4

- (Japan) M Saeki
- (Japan) Y Yoshida
**6**
1
3

7
- (Russia) E Likhovtseva
- (Japan) A Sugiyama
6
3

- (Australia) **C Barclay**
- (Australia) **K-A Guse**
5
**7**
**6**

3
- (Indonesia) **Y Basuki**
- (Netherlands) **C Vis**
**7**
**6**

- (Argentina) F Labat
- (South Korea) S-H Park
**7**
5
4

- (Australia) C Barclay
- (Australia) K-A Guse
**6**
2
4

3
- (Indonesia) **Y Basuki**
- (Netherlands) **C Vis**
3
**6**
**6**

3
- (Indonesia) Y Basuki
- (Netherlands) C Vis
1
4

5
- (Russia) **A Kournikova**
- (Latvia) **L Neiland**
**6**
2
**6**

2
- (France) **A Fusai**
- (France) **N Tauziat**
**6**
**6**

LL
- (Sweden) Å Carlsson
- (China) F Li
4
**6**
3

5
- (Russia) **A Kournikova**
- (Latvia) **L Neiland**
4
**7**
**7**

- (Australia) **K Kunce**
- (United States) **C Morariu**
**7**
6
**6**

- (Australia) K Kunce
- (United States) C Morariu
**6**
5
6

WC
- (Germany) S Graf
- (Germany) B Rittner
5
**7**
1

5
- (Russia) A Kournikova
- (Latvia) L Neiland
5
**6**
1^{r}

- (South Africa) N de Villiers
- (United States) D Graham
1
6

2
- (France) **A Fusai**
- (France) **N Tauziat**
**7**
1
**5**

- (South Africa) **A Coetzer**
- (United States) **C Rubin**
**6**
**7**

- (South Africa) A Coetzer
- (United States) C Rubin
3
2

2
- (France) **A Fusai**
- (France) **N Tauziat**
**6**
**6**

== Qualifying ==
=== Seeds ===
1. (Italy) Silvia Farina / (Austria) Barbara Schett (second round)
2. (Czech Republic) Radka Bobková / (Canada) Sonya Jeyaseelan (first round)

=== Qualifiers ===
1. **(Zimbabwe) Cara Black / (United States) Lilia Osterloh**

=== Lucky losers ===
1. **(Sweden) Åsa Carlsson / (China) Li Fang**

=== Qualifying draw ===
First round

Second round

Qualifying competition

1
- (Italy) **Silvia Farina**
- (Austria) **Barbara Schett**
**9**

- (Argentina) Mariana Díaz Oliva
- (Japan) Haruka Inoue
7

1
- (Italy) Silvia Farina
- (Austria) Barbara Schett
3

- (Zimbabwe) **Cara Black**
- (United States) **Lilia Osterloh**
**8**

- (Zimbabwe) **Cara Black**
- (United States) **Lilia Osterloh**
**8**

- (Canada) Patricia Hy-Boulais
- (South Africa) Joannette Kruger
5

- (Zimbabwe) **Cara Black**
- (United States) **Lilia Osterloh**
**8**

- (Sweden) Åsa Carlsson
- (China) Li Fang
3

- (France) Lea Ghirardi
- (Czech Republic) Lenka Němečková
1

- (Switzerland) **Emmanuelle Gagliardi**
- (France) **Sarah Pitkowski**
**8**

- (Switzerland) Emmanuelle Gagliardi
- (France) Sarah Pitkowski
5

- (Sweden) **Åsa Carlsson**
- (China) **Li Fang**
**8**

- (Sweden) **Åsa Carlsson**
- (China) **Li Fang**
**9**

2
- (Czech Republic) Radka Bobková
- (Canada) Sonya Jeyaseelan
7
