= 1998 Newsweek Champions Cup – Doubles =

Doubles
- 1998 Newsweek Champions Cup and the State Farm Evert Cup

Final
- Champions: (Sweden) Jonas Björkman (Australia) Patrick Rafter
- Runners-up: (United States) Todd Martin (United States) Richey Reneberg
- Score: 6–4, 7–6

Events
Singles	men	women
Doubles	men	women
← 1997 ·	Newsweek Champions Cup	· 1999 →
← 1997 ·	State Farm Evert Cup	· 1999 →

Mark Knowles and Daniel Nestor were the defending champions, but lost in the second round this year.

Jonas Björkman and Patrick Rafter won the title, defeating Todd Martin and Richey Reneberg 6–4, 7–6 in the final.

== Seeds ==
1. (Australia) Todd Woodbridge / (Australia) Mark Woodforde (second round)
2. (Russia) Yevgeny Kafelnikov / (Czech Republic) Daniel Vacek (quarterfinals)
3. (South Africa) Ellis Ferreira / (United States) Rick Leach (second round)
4. (Sweden) Jonas Björkman / (Australia) Patrick Rafter (champions)
5. (United States) Donald Johnson / (United States) Francisco Montana (first round)
6. (Argentina) Luis Lobo / (Spain) Javier Sánchez (quarterfinals)
7. (United States) Alex O'Brien / (United States) Jonathan Stark (semifinals)
8. (The Bahamas) Mark Knowles / (Canada) Daniel Nestor (second round)

== Draw ==
=== Key ===
- Q = Qualifier
- WC = Wild card
- LL = Lucky loser
- Alt = Alternate
- SE = Special exempt
- PR = Protected ranking
- ITF = ITF entry
- JE = Junior exempt
- w/o = Walkover
- r = Retired
- d = Defaulted
- SR = Special ranking

=== Finals ===
Semifinals
7	(United States) Alex O'Brien (United States) Jonathan Stark	3	6	1
4	(Sweden) Jonas Björkman (Australia) Patrick Rafter	6	3	6
WC	(United States) Todd Martin (United States) Richey Reneberg	2	6	6
(Australia) Joshua Eagle (Australia) Andrew Florent	6	3	4

Final
4	(Sweden) Jonas Björkman (Australia) Patrick Rafter	6	7
WC	(United States) Todd Martin (United States) Richey Reneberg	4	6

=== Top half ===
First round
(United States) T Kronemann (Mexico) D Roditi	5	3
(United States) J Courier (Australia) M Philippoussis	7	6
Q	(United States) D Randall (United States) J Waite	6	3	2
(South Africa) D Adams (France) F Santoro	3	6	6
(Canada) S Lareau (United States) J Tarango	6	1	5
7	(United States) A O'Brien (United States) J Stark	2	6	7
(Argentina) P Albano (Spain) À Corretja	1	6
(United Kingdom) T Henman (Croatia) G Ivanišević	6	7
(Brazil) G Kuerten (Brazil) F Meligeni	6	7
(Argentina) L Arnold (Argentina) D Orsanic	4	5
(Zimbabwe) W Black (United States) J Salzenstein	2	4
6	(Argentina) L Lobo (Spain) J Sánchez	6	6

Second round
1	(Australia) T Woodbridge (Australia) M Woodforde	4	6	5
(United States) J Courier (Australia) M Philippoussis	6	2	7
(South Africa) D Adams (France) F Santoro	4	4
7	(United States) A O'Brien (United States) J Stark	6	6
4	(Sweden) J Björkman (Australia) P Rafter	6	7
(United Kingdom) T Henman (Croatia) G Ivanišević	3	5
(Brazil) G Kuerten (Brazil) F Meligeni	6	6	6
6	(Argentina) L Lobo (Spain) J Sánchez	3	7	7

Quarterfinals
(United States) J Courier (Australia) M Philippoussis	6	2	6
7	(United States) A O'Brien (United States) J Stark	4	6	7
4	(Sweden) J Björkman (Australia) P Rafter	6	7	6
6	(Argentina) L Lobo (Spain) J Sánchez	7	6	3

Semifinals
7	(United States) A O'Brien (United States) J Stark	3	6	1
4	(Sweden) J Björkman (Australia) P Rafter	6	3	6

=== Bottom half ===
First round
5	(United States) D Johnson (United States) F Montana	6	0^{r}
(Zimbabwe) B Black (United States) J Grabb	7	2
(South Africa) W Ferreira (France) C Pioline	6	4
WC	(United States) T Martin (United States) R Reneberg	7	6
(South Africa) J-L de Jager (Australia) D Macpherson	3	6	3
WC	(Australia) S Stolle (Czech Republic) C Suk	6	3	6
8	(The Bahamas) M Knowles (Canada) D Nestor	7	6
Q	(Sweden) R Bergh (South Africa) R Koenig	6	4
(United States) L Jensen (United States) M Jensen	7	3	5
(Australia) J Eagle (Australia) A Florent	6	6	7
(United Kingdom) N Broad (South Africa) P Norval	4	2
(United States) P Galbraith (United States) B MacPhie	6	6

Second round
(Zimbabwe) B Black (United States) J Grabb	3	4
WC	(United States) T Martin (United States) R Reneberg	6	6
WC	(Australia) S Stolle (Czech Republic) C Suk	7	6	6
3	(South Africa) E Ferreira (United States) R Leach	6	7	1
8	(The Bahamas) M Knowles (Canada) D Nestor	6	5	4
(Australia) J Eagle (Australia) A Florent	3	6	7
(United States) P Galbraith (United States) B MacPhie	7	3	2
2	(Russia) Y Kafelnikov (Czech Republic) D Vacek	6	6	6

Quarterfinals
WC	(United States) T Martin (United States) R Reneberg	6	6
WC	(Australia) S Stolle (Czech Republic) C Suk	0	3
(Australia) J Eagle (Australia) A Florent	6	7	6
2	(Russia) Y Kafelnikov (Czech Republic) D Vacek	7	5	4

Semifinals
WC	(United States) T Martin (United States) R Reneberg	2	6	6
(Australia) J Eagle (Australia) A Florent	6	3	4

== Qualifying ==
=== Seeds ===
1. (United States) Dave Randall / (United States) Jack Waite (qualified)
2. (Spain) Julián Alonso / (Ecuador) Nicolás Lapentti (qualifying competition)
3. (United States) Scott Davis / (South Africa) Byron Talbot (qualifying competition)
4. (Sweden) Rikard Bergh / (South Africa) Robbie Koenig (qualified)

=== Qualifiers ===
1. (United States) Dave Randall / (United States) Jack Waite
2. (Sweden) Rikard Bergh / (South Africa) Robbie Koenig

=== Qualifying draw ===
==== First qualifier ====
First round					Qualifying competition
1	(United States) Dave Randall (United States) Jack Waite	6	7
WC	(Czech Republic) Sláva Doseděl (Slovakia) Dominik Hrbatý	4	5		1	(United States) Dave Randall (United States) Jack Waite	7	6
	(Germany) Nicolas Kiefer (Switzerland) Marc Rosset	7	1	2	3	(United States) Scott Davis (South Africa) Byron Talbot	6	1
3	(United States) Scott Davis (South Africa) Byron Talbot	6	6	6

==== Second qualifier ====
First round					Qualifying competition
2	(Spain) Julián Alonso (Ecuador) Nicolás Lapentti	7	4	6
WC	(Switzerland) George Bastl (United Kingdom) Kyle Spencer	6	6	3	2	(Spain) Julián Alonso (Ecuador) Nicolás Lapentti	6	3	6
WC	(Slovakia) Karol Kučera (Sweden) Magnus Norman	2	3		4	(Sweden) Rikard Bergh (South Africa) Robbie Koenig	4	6	7
4	(Sweden) Rikard Bergh (South Africa) Robbie Koenig	6	6
