= 1997 U.S. Men's Clay Court Championships – Singles =

Singles
- 1997 U.S. Men's Clay Court Championships

Final
- Champion: (United States) Michael Chang
- Runner-up: (South Africa) Grant Stafford
- Score: 4–6, 6–2, 6–1

Details
- Draw: 32
- Seeds: 8

Events
Singles	Doubles
- U.S. Men's Clay Court Championships

Fernando Meligeni the defending champion, lost in the quarterfinals to Grant Stafford.

Michael Chang won the title, defeating Grant Stafford 4–6, 6–2, 6–1 in the final.

== Seeds ==
A champion seed is indicated in bold text while text in italics indicates the round in which that seed was eliminated.

1. (United States) **Michael Chang (champion)**
2. (United States) MaliVai Washington (first round)
3. (Czech Republic) Petr Korda (second round)
4. (United States) Alex O'Brien (quarterfinals)
5. (Australia) Jason Stoltenberg (semifinals)
6. (United States) Chris Woodruff (semifinals)
7. (Zimbabwe) Byron Black (quarterfinals)
8. (Australia) Sandon Stolle (second round)

== Draw ==
Key

- Q = Qualifier
- WC = Wild card
- LL = Lucky loser
- Alt = Alternate
- ITF = ITF entry
- PR = Protected ranking
- SR = Special ranking
- SE = Special exempt
- JE = Junior exempt
- JR = Junior Accelerator Programme entrant
- CO = College Accelerator Programme entrant
- NG = Next Gen Accelerator Program entrant
- w/o = Walkover
- r = Retired
- d = Defaulted

First round
1	(United States) **M Chang**	**6**	**6**
WC	(United States) J-M Gambill	3	3
WC	(United States) L Jensen	2	2
(Spain) **J A Viloca**	**6**	**6**
(Netherlands) **D van Scheppingen**	**6**	**6**
(Sweden) P Fredriksson	4	4
(Belgium) J Van Herck	3	6^{4}
7	(Zimbabwe) **B Black**	**6**	**7^{7}**
3	(Czech Republic) **P Korda**	2	**6**	4
WC	(United States) J Salzenstein	**6**	4	3^{r}
Q	(Zimbabwe) W Black	4	5
(Uruguay) **M Filippini**	**6**	**7**
(Sweden) **M Norman**	**7**	2
(France) G Raoux	5	1^{r}
(Armenia) S Sargsian	1	5
5	(Australia) **J Stoltenberg**	**6**	**7**
6	(United States) **C Woodruff**	4	**6**	**6**
(Argentina) J Frana	**6**	4	4
(United States) V Spadea	1	2
(Germany) **O Gross**	**6**	**6**
Q	(Brazil) R Jabali	**6**	2	3
(Denmark) **K Carlsen**	4	**6**	**6**
(Austria) G Schaller	4	2
4	(United States) **A O'Brien**	**6**	**6**
8	(Australia) **S Stolle**	**6**	**7^{7}**
(Argentina) M Zabaleta	3	6^{4}
(South Africa) **G Stafford**	**6**	**6**
(France) T Champion	2	1
Q	(The Bahamas) M Merklein	6^{3}	6^{6}
(Brazil) **F Meligeni**	**7^{7}**	**7^{8}**
Q	(Argentina) **M Rodríguez**	**6**	**6**
2	(United States) M Washington	1	2

Second round
1	(United States) **M Chang**	**6**	6^{3}	**7**
(Spain) J A Viloca	2	**7^{7}**	5
(Netherlands) D van Scheppingen	6^{6}	**6**	3
7	(Zimbabwe) **B Black**	**7^{8}**	3	**6**
3	(Czech Republic) P Korda	3	1
(Uruguay) **M Filippini**	**6**	**6**
(Sweden) M Norman	6^{3}	4
5	(Australia) **J Stoltenberg**	**7^{7}**	**6**
6	(United States) **C Woodruff**	**7**	**7^{7}**
(Germany) O Gross	5	6^{3}
(Denmark) K Carlsen	**6**	3	2
4	(United States) **A O'Brien**	2	**6**	**6**
8	(Australia) S Stolle	2	3
(South Africa) **G Stafford**	**6**	**6**
(Brazil) **F Meligeni**	**6**	**6**
Q	(Argentina) M Rodríguez	4	2

Quarterfinals
1	(United States) **M Chang**	**7**	**6**
7	(Zimbabwe) B Black	5	3
(Uruguay) M Filippini	**7^{7}**	4	4
5	(Australia) **J Stoltenberg**	6^{3}	**6**	**6**
6	(United States) **C Woodruff**	**6**	6^{5}	**6**
4	(United States) A O'Brien	4	**7^{7}**	4
(South Africa) **G Stafford**	**6**	**6**
(Brazil) F Meligeni	3	4

Semifinals
1	(United States) **M Chang**	4	**6**	**6**
5	(Australia) J Stoltenberg	**6**	3	3
6	(United States) C Woodruff	3	**6**	4
(South Africa) **G Stafford**	**6**	4	**6**

Final
1	(United States) **Michael Chang**	4	**6**	**6**
(South Africa) Grant Stafford	**6**	2	1
