= 1997 U.S. Men's Clay Court Championships =

- Date: April 21–28
- Edition: 29th
- Category: World Series
- Draw: 32S / 16D
- Prize money: $264,250
- Surface: Clay / outdoor
- Location: Orlando, Florida, U.S.

Champions

Singles
- (United States) Michael Chang

Doubles
- (The Bahamas) Mark Merklein / (United States) Vincent Spadea
← 1996 ·	U.S. Men's Clay Court Championships	· 1998 →

The 1997 U.S. Men's Clay Court Championships was an Association of Tennis Professionals men's tennis tournament held in Orlando, Florida in the United States that was part of the World Series of the 1997 ATP Tour. It was the 29th edition of the tournament and was held from April 21 to April 28. First-seeded Michael Chang won the singles title.

== Finals ==
=== Singles ===
(United States) Michael Chang defeated (South Africa) Grant Stafford 4–6, 6–2, 6–1

- It was Chang's 4th title of the year and the 30th of his career.

=== Doubles ===
(The Bahamas) Mark Merklein / (United States) Vincent Spadea defeated (United States) Alex O'Brien / (United States) Jeff Salzenstein 6–4, 4–6, 6–4

- It was Merklein's only title of the year and the 1st of his career. It was Spadea's 1st title of the year and the 2nd of his career.
