= 1996 U.S. Men's Clay Court Championships – Doubles =

Doubles
- 1996 U.S. Men's Clay Court Championships

Final
- Champions: (Australia) Pat Cash (Australia) Patrick Rafter
- Runners-up: (United States) Ken Flach (United States) David Wheaton
- Score: 6–2, 6–3

Details
- Draw: 16
- Seeds: 4

Events
Singles	Doubles
← 1995 ·	U.S. Men's Clay Court Championships	· 1997 →

Todd Woodbridge and Mark Woodforde were the defending champions but did not compete that year.

Pat Cash and Patrick Rafter won in the final 6–2, 6–3 against Ken Flach and David Wheaton.

== Seeds ==
Champion seeds are indicated in bold text while text in italics indicates the round in which those seeds were eliminated.

1. (United States) Alex O'Brien / (Australia) Sandon Stolle (semifinals)
2. (Sweden) Jonas Björkman / (Sweden) Nicklas Kulti (first round)
3. (United States) Brian MacPhie / (Australia) Michael Tebbutt (first round)
4. (United States) Kent Kinnear / (United States) Dave Randall (first round)

== Draw ==
Key

- Q = Qualifier
- WC = Wild card
- LL = Lucky loser
- Alt = Alternate
- ITF = ITF entry
- PR = Protected ranking
- SR = Special ranking
- SE = Special exempt
- JE = Junior exempt
- JR = Junior Accelerator Programme entrant
- CO = College Accelerator Programme entrant
- NG = Next Gen Accelerator Program entrant
- w/o = Walkover
- r = Retired
- d = Defaulted

First round
1	(United States) **A O'Brien** (Australia) **S Stolle**	**6**	6	**7**
(France) G Raoux (United States) C Woodruff	1	**7**	6
WC	(United States) M Joyce (United States) D Witt	3	**6**	5
(The Bahamas) **R Smith** (Netherlands) **J Winnink**	**6**	4	**7**
3	(United States) B MacPhie (Australia) M Tebbutt	4	5
(United States) **L Jensen** (United States) **D Johnson**	**6**	**7**
(United States) **K Flach** (United States) **D Wheaton**	**6**	**6**
WC	(United States) D Caldwell (United States) C Clark	3	3
(United States) **J Palmer** (United States) **R Reneberg**	3	**6**	**7**
WC	(United States) V Spadea (Australia) J Stoltenberg	**6**	3	6
Q	(United States) **B Garnett** (United States) **T.J. Middleton**	**7**	**6**
4	(United States) K Kinnear (United States) D Randall	5	3
(United States) B Behrens (South Africa) B Haygarth	6	4
(Australia) **P Cash** (Australia) **P Rafter**	**7**	**6**
(Argentina) **J Frana** (United States) **K Jones**	4	**6**	**6**
2	(Sweden) J Björkman (Sweden) N Kulti	**6**	4	4

Quarterfinals
1	(United States) **A O'Brien** (Australia) **S Stolle**	**6**	5	**6**
(The Bahamas) R Smith (Netherlands) J Winnink	1	**7**	3
(United States) L Jensen (United States) D Johnson	**7**	6	6
(United States) **K Flach** (United States) **D Wheaton**	5	**7**	**7**
(United States) J Palmer (United States) R Reneberg	6	3
Q	(United States) **B Garnett** (United States) **T.J. Middleton**	**7**	**6**
(Australia) **P Cash** (Australia) **P Rafter**	**6**	6	**6**
(Argentina) J Frana (United States) K Jones	3	**7**	2

Semifinals
1	(United States) **A O'Brien** (Australia) S Stolle	**6**	6	4
(United States) **K Flach** (United States) **D Wheaton**	3	**7**	**6**
Q	(United States) B Garnett (United States) T.J. Middleton	4	3
(Australia) **P Cash** (Australia) **P Rafter**	**6**	**6**

Final
(United States) K Flach (United States) D Wheaton	2	3
(Australia) **P Cash** (Australia) **P Rafter**	**6**	**6**
