= 1996 U.S. Men's Clay Court Championships =

- Date: May 6–12
- Edition: 28th
- Category: World Series
- Draw: 32S / 16D
- Prize money: $264,250
- Surface: Clay / outdoor
- Location: Pinehurst, North Carolina, U.S.

Champions

Singles
- (Brazil) Fernando Meligeni

Doubles
- (Australia) Pat Cash / (Australia) Patrick Rafter
← 1995 ·	U.S. Men's Clay Court Championships	· 1997 →

The 1996 Rolling Rock U.S. Men's Clay Court Championships was a men's tennis tournament played on outdoor clay courts in Pinehurst, North Carolina in the United States and was part of the World Series of the 1996 ATP Tour. It was the 28th edition of the tournament and ran from May 6 through May 12, 1996. Unseeded Fernando Meligeni won the singles title.

== Finals ==
=== Singles ===
(Brazil) Fernando Meligeni defeated (Sweden) Mats Wilander 6–4, 6–2

- It was Meligeni's 2nd title of the year and the 3rd of his career.

=== Doubles ===
(Australia) Pat Cash / (Australia) Patrick Rafter defeated (United States) Ken Flach / (United States) David Wheaton 6–2, 6–3

- It was Cash's only title of the year and the 19th of his career. It was Rafter's only title of the year and the 4th of his career.
