= 1996 U.S. Men's Clay Court Championships – Singles =

Singles
- 1996 U.S. Men's Clay Court Championships

Final
- Champion: (Brazil) Fernando Meligeni
- Runner-up: (Sweden) Mats Wilander
- Score: 6–4, 6–2

Details
- Draw: 32
- Seeds: 8

Events
Singles	Doubles
- U.S. Men's Clay Court Championships

Thomas Enqvist was the defending champion but did not compete that year.

Fernando Meligeni won in the final 6–4, 6–2 against Mats Wilander.

== Seeds ==
A champion seed is indicated in bold text while text in italics indicates the round in which that seed was eliminated.

1. (Australia) Mark Woodforde (first round)
2. (Australia) Todd Woodbridge (second round)
3. (Sweden) Magnus Gustafsson (second round)
4. (United States) Richey Reneberg (quarterfinals)
5. (Argentina) Javier Frana (semifinals)
6. (Australia) Jason Stoltenberg (semifinals)
7. (Spain) Félix Mantilla (first round)
8. (United States) Michael Joyce (first round)

== Draw ==
Key

- Q = Qualifier
- WC = Wild card
- LL = Lucky loser
- Alt = Alternate
- ITF = ITF entry
- PR = Protected ranking
- SR = Special ranking
- SE = Special exempt
- JE = Junior exempt
- JR = Junior Accelerator Programme entrant
- CO = College Accelerator Programme entrant
- NG = Next Gen Accelerator Program entrant
- w/o = Walkover
- r = Retired
- d = Defaulted

First round
1	(Australia) M Woodforde	6^{4}	2
(United States) **V Spadea**	**7^{7}**	**6**
WC	(United States) M Sell	2	2
Q	(Australia) **R Fromberg**	**6**	**6**
(Sweden) **M Wilander**	**6**	**6**
(Australia) S Stolle	4	4
(France) **G Raoux**	**6**	**7^{7}**
8	(United States) M Joyce	1	6^{1}
3	(Sweden) **M Gustafsson**	**6**	**6**
(Sweden) J Apell	2	3
(Sweden) **J Björkman**	**7**	**6**
(Portugal) N Marques	5	2
Q	(The Bahamas) M Merklein	3	2
(Morocco) **K Alami**	**6**	**6**
(United States) D Wheaton	**7^{7}**	2	4
5	(Argentina) **J Frana**	6^{4}	**6**	**6**
6	(Australia) **J Stoltenberg**	5	**6**	**6**
(Sweden) N Kulti	**7**	4	3
Q	(Venezuela) J Szymanski	**6**	2	4
(Colombia) **M Hadad**	1	**6**	**6**
(Belgium) **J Van Herck**	**7^{7}**	**6**
(Australia) M Tebbutt	6^{1}	3
(United States) C Woodruff	5	**6**	4
4	(United States) **R Reneberg**	**7**	0	**6**
7	(Spain) F Mantilla	3	2
(Australia) **P Rafter**	**6**	**6**
WC	(United States) **J Palmer**	**6**	**7**
WC	(United States) B Behrens	4	5
Q	(Italy) F Maggi	4	3
(Brazil) **F Meligeni**	**6**	**6**
(Belgium) K Goossens	4	3
2	(Australia) **T Woodbridge**	**6**	**6**

Second round
(United States) **V Spadea**	**7^{7}**	**6**
Q	(Australia) R Fromberg	6^{1}	3
(Sweden) **M Wilander**	**6**	**6**
(France) G Raoux	1	2
3	(Sweden) M Gustafsson	6^{7}	**6**	5
(Sweden) **J Björkman**	**7^{9}**	1	**7**
(Morocco) K Alami	0	4
5	(Argentina) **J Frana**	**6**	**6**
6	(Australia) **J Stoltenberg**	**6**	**6**
(Colombia) M Hadad	4	2
(Belgium) J Van Herck	4	1
4	(United States) **R Reneberg**	**6**	**6**
(Australia) **P Rafter**	**7**	4	**6**
WC	(United States) J Palmer	5	**6**	4
(Brazil) **F Meligeni**	6^{3}	**7^{7}**	**6**
2	(Australia) T Woodbridge	**7^{7}**	6^{4}	1

Quarterfinals
(United States) V Spadea	**6**	3	2
(Sweden) **M Wilander**	1	**6**	**6**
(Sweden) J Björkman	4	**6**	6^{4}
5	(Argentina) **J Frana**	**6**	3	**7^{7}**
6	(Australia) **J Stoltenberg**	**6**	**7**
4	(United States) R Reneberg	4	5
(Australia) P Rafter	**6**	6^{7}	3
(Brazil) **F Meligeni**	3	**7^{9}**	**6**

Semifinals
(Sweden) **M Wilander**	**6**	**6**
5	(Argentina) J Frana	3	3
6	(Australia) J Stoltenberg	**6**	0	4
(Brazil) **F Meligeni**	2	**6**	**6**

Final
(Sweden) Mats Wilander	4	2
(Brazil) **Fernando Meligeni**	**6**	**6**
