= 1997 State Farm Evert Cup – Singles =

Singles
- 1997 Newsweek Champions Cup and the State Farm Evert Cup
- 1996 Champion: (Germany) Steffi Graf

Final
- Champion: (United States) Lindsay Davenport
- Runner-up: (Romania) Irina Spîrlea
- Score: 6–2, 6–1

Details
- Draw: 56
- Seeds: 16

Events
Singles	men	women
Doubles	men	women
← 1996 ·	Newsweek Champions Cup	· 1998 →
← 1996 ·	State Farm Evert Cup	· 1998 →

Lindsay Davenport defeated Irina Spîrlea in the final, 6–2, 6–1 to win the women's singles tennis title at the 1997 Indian Wells Masters.

Steffi Graf was the reigning champion, but did not compete that year.

== Seeds ==
A champion seed is indicated in bold text while text in italics indicates the round in which that seed was eliminated. The top nine seeds received a bye to the second round.

1. (Spain) Arantxa Sánchez Vicario (semifinals)
2. (Spain) Conchita Martínez (quarterfinals)
3. (Germany) Anke Huber (third round)
4. (United States) **Lindsay Davenport (champion)**
5. (Croatia) Iva Majoli (third round)
6. (Romania) Irina Spîrlea (final)
7. n/a
8. (South Africa) Amanda Coetzer (second round)
9. (United States) Mary Joe Fernández (semifinals)
10. (Austria) Barbara Paulus (second round)
11. (United States) Kimberly Po (third round)
12. (Russia) Elena Likhovtseva (third round)
13. (France) Nathalie Tauziat (quarterfinals)
14. (Romania) Ruxandra Dragomir (third round)
15. (United States) Chanda Rubin (third round)
16. (United States) Lisa Raymond (second round)
17. (Japan) Ai Sugiyama (second round)

== Draw ==
=== Key ===
- Q = Qualifier
- WC = Wild card
- LL = Lucky loser
- Alt = Alternate
- SE = Special exempt
- PR = Protected ranking
- ITF = ITF entry
- JE = Junior exempt
- w/o = Walkover
- r = Retired
- d = Defaulted
- SR = Special ranking

=== Finals ===
Semifinals
1	(Spain) Arantxa Sánchez Vicario	**6**	3	3
6	(Romania) **Irina Spîrlea**	4	**6**	**6**
4	(United States) **Lindsay Davenport**	**6**	**6**
9	(United States) Mary Joe Fernández	1	1

Final
6	(Romania) Irina Spîrlea	2	1
4	(United States) **Lindsay Davenport**	**6**	**6**

=== Top half ===
==== Section 1 ====
First round
Q	(Japan) N Miyagi	3	4
(Italy) **S Farina**	**6**	**6**
(Austria) B Schett	**7^{7}**	2	2
(Sweden) **Å Carlsson**	6^{4}	**6**	**6**
LL	(Italy) F Lubiani	**7^{10}**	1	4
10	(Austria) **B Paulus**	6^{8}	**6**	**6**
16	(United States) **L Raymond**	**7^{7}**	**6**
Q	(Germany) J Kandarr	6^{4}	2
(France) A-G Sidot	**7^{7}**	5	2
(France) **S Testud**	6^{5}	**7**	**6**
WC	(Sweden) K Triska	2	1
(Argentina) **F Labat**	**6**	**6**

Second round
1	(Spain) **A Sánchez Vicario**	**6**	**6**
(Italy) S Farina	4	2
(Sweden) **Å Carlsson**	**6**	**6**
10	(Austria) B Paulus	4	4
16	(United States) L Raymond	**7**	3	4
(France) **S Testud**	5	**6**	**6**
(Argentina) **F Labat**	1	**7**	**7**
8	(South Africa) A Coetzer	**6**	5	5

Third round
1	(Spain) **A Sánchez Vicario**	**6**	**6**
(Sweden) Å Carlsson	1	3
(France) **S Testud**	**6**	**6**
(Argentina) F Labat	2	2

Quarterfinals
1	(Spain) **A Sánchez Vicario**	3	**6**	**6**
(France) S Testud	**6**	2	2

==== Section 2 ====
First round
(Canada) P Hy-Boulais	**6**	1	4
(Russia) **A Kournikova**	1	**6**	**6**
(Czech Republic) **H Suková**	**6**	5	**6**
(Italy) G Pizzichini	1	**7**	2
(Belgium) S Devillé	1	0
13	(France) **N Tauziat**	**6**	**6**
12	(Russia) **E Likhovtseva**	**7^{7}**	4	**7**
(Slovakia) K Studeníková	6^{2}	**6**	5
WC	(Belarus) **O Barabanschikova**	**6**	**7**
WC	(United States) A Stevenson	4	5
Q	(France) **A Dechaume-Balleret**	**6**	**6**
(Austria) K Kschwendt	2	2

Second round
3	(Germany) **A Huber**	3	**6**	**6**
(Russia) A Kournikova	**6**	2	2
(Czech Republic) H Suková	2	2
13	(France) **N Tauziat**	**6**	**6**
12	(Russia) **E Likhovtseva**	**6**	**6**
WC	(Belarus) O Barabanschikova	2	2
Q	(France) A Dechaume-Balleret	**7^{7}**	6^{7}	2
6	(Romania) **I Spîrlea**	6^{3}	**7^{9}**	**6**

Third round
3	(Germany) A Huber	4	3
13	(France) **N Tauziat**	**6**	**6**
12	(Russia) E Likhovtseva	3	4
6	(Romania) **I Spîrlea**	**6**	**6**

Quarterfinals
13	(France) N Tauziat	4	2
6	(Romania) **I Spîrlea**	**6**	**6**

=== Bottom half ===
==== Section 3 ====
First round
(Japan) M Endo	4	1
(Belarus) **N Zvereva**	**6**	**6**
(United States) A Miller	2	4
Q	(United States) **V Williams**	**6**	**6**
(Japan) N Kijimuta	4	**7^{7}**	6^{1}
17	(Japan) **A Sugiyama**	**6**	6^{2}	**7^{7}**
14	(Romania) **R Dragomir**	**6**	**7**
Q	(United States) K Brandi	4	5
(Argentina) P Suárez	4	6^{4}
(Russia) **E Makarova**	**6**	**7^{7}**
Q	(United States) **T Whitlinger-Jones**	5	**6**	**6**
(Netherlands) K Boogert	**7**	4	3

Second round
5	(Croatia) **I Majoli**	**6**	**6**
(Belarus) N Zvereva	4	4
Q	(United States) **V Williams**	3	**6**	**6**
17	(Japan) A Sugiyama	**6**	3	2
14	(Romania) **R Dragomir**	**6**	3	**6**
(Russia) E Makarova	3	**6**	2
Q	(United States) T Whitlinger-Jones	4	0
4	(United States) **L Davenport**	**6**	**6**

Third round
5	(Croatia) I Majoli	5	**6**	5
Q	(United States) **V Williams**	**7**	3	**7**
14	(Romania) R Dragomir	2	1
4	(United States) **L Davenport**	**6**	**6**

Quarterfinals
Q	(United States) V Williams	4	**7**	6^{1}
4	(United States) **L Davenport**	**6**	5	**7^{7}**

==== Section 4 ====
First round
Q	(Poland) M Grzybowska	**7^{7}**	3	2
(Latvia) **L Neiland**	6^{5}	**6**	**6**
(Germany) **B Rittner**	5	**6**	**6**
(Thailand) T Tanasugarn	**7**	0	2
(United States) A Grossman	**7**	0	0
11	(United States) **K Po**	5	**6**	**6**
15	(United States) **C Rubin**	**6**	4	**7^{8}**
(United States) A Frazier	3	**6**	6^{6}
Q	(Germany) M Weingärtner	**7**	2	2
(Japan) **N Sawamatsu**	5	**6**	**6**
(Germany) **P Begerow**	6^{2}	**6**	**6**
LL	(Romania) C Cristea	**7^{7}**	1	1

Second round
9	(United States) **M J Fernández**	**6**	**6**
(Latvia) L Neiland	3	3
(Germany) B Rittner	5	2
11	(United States) **K Po**	**7**	**6**
15	(United States) **C Rubin**	**7**	2	**7**
(Japan) N Sawamatsu	5	**6**	5
(Germany) P Begerow	4	2
2	(Spain) **C Martínez**	**6**	**6**

Third round
9	(United States) **M J Fernández**	**6**	**6**
11	(United States) K Po	2	3
15	(United States) C Rubin	1	**6**	5
2	(Spain) **C Martínez**	**6**	1	**7**

Quarterfinals
9	(United States) **M J Fernández**	**6**	**6**
2	(Spain) C Martínez	4	4
