= 1997 State Farm Evert Cup – Doubles =

Doubles
- 1997 Newsweek Champions Cup and the State Farm Evert Cup

Final
- Champions: (United States) Lindsay Davenport (Belarus) Natasha Zvereva
- Runners-up: (United States) Lisa Raymond (France) Nathalie Tauziat
- Score: 6–3, 6–2

Details
- Draw: 28
- Seeds: 8

Events
| Singles | men | women |
| Doubles | men | women |
| ← 1996 · | Newsweek Champions Cup | · 1998 → |
| ← 1996 · | State Farm Evert Cup | · 1998 → |

Chanda Rubin and Brenda Schultz-McCarthy were the defending champions but only Rubin competed that year with Mary Joe Fernández.

Fernandez and Rubin lost in the semifinals to Lindsay Davenport and Natasha Zvereva.

Davenport and Zvereva won in the final 6–3, 6–2 against Lisa Raymond and Nathalie Tauziat.

== Seeds ==
Champion seeds are indicated in bold text while text in italics indicates the round in which those seeds were eliminated. The top four seeded teams received byes into the second round.

1. (United States) Gigi Fernández / (Spain) Arantxa Sánchez Vicario (semifinals)
2. (Latvia) Larisa Neiland / (Czech Republic) Helena Suková (second round)
3. (United States) **Lindsay Davenport** / (Belarus) **Natasha Zvereva (champions)**
4. (United States) Lisa Raymond / (France) Nathalie Tauziat (final)
5. (United States) Katrina Adams / (Netherlands) Manon Bollegraf (second round)
6. (United States) Mary Joe Fernández / (United States) Chanda Rubin (semifinals)
7. (Japan) Naoko Kijimuta / (Japan) Nana Miyagi (second round)
8. (Spain) Conchita Martínez / (Argentina) Patricia Tarabini (first round)

== Draw ==
=== Key ===
- Q = Qualifier
- WC = Wild card
- LL = Lucky loser
- Alt = Alternate
- SE = Special exempt
- PR = Protected ranking
- ITF = ITF entry
- JE = Junior exempt
- w/o = Walkover
- r = Retired
- d = Defaulted
- SR = Special ranking

=== Finals ===
| Final |
| 4 | (United States) Lisa Raymond (France) Nathalie Tauziat | 3 | 2 |
| 3 | (United States) **Lindsay Davenport** (Belarus) **Natasha Zvereva** | **6** | **6** |

=== Top half ===
First round
(United States) A Grossman (United States) G Helgeson-Nielsen | 6^{4} | 5
(Spain) **V Ruano-Pascual** (Argentina) **P Suárez** | **7^{7}** | **7**
WC | (Croatia) **I Majoli** (Croatia) **M Murić** | 2 | **6** | **6**
(Canada) P Hy-Boulais (Canada) R Simpson | **6** | 4 | 4
(United States) M Werdel-Witmeyer (United States) T Whitlinger-Jones | 6^{5} | 3
5 | (United States) **K Adams** (Netherlands) **M Bollegraf** | **7^{7}** | **6**
(Australia) A Ellwood (Australia) R McQuillan | 4 | 2
(Italy) **R Grande** (Japan) **A Sugiyama** | **6** | **6**
(United States) D Graham (Australia) K Radford | **6** | 2 | 3/r
(France) **A Dechaume-Balleret** (France) **S Testud** | 2 | **6** | **4**
(Japan) R Hiraki (Argentina) L Montalvo | 3 | 1
7 | (Japan) **N Kijimuta** (Japan) **N Miyagi** | **6** | **6**

Second round
1 | (United States) **G Fernández** (Spain) **A Sánchez Vicario** | **7** | **7^{7}**
(Spain) V Ruano-Pascual (Argentina) P Suárez | 5 | 6^{3}
WC | (Croatia) **I Majoli** (Croatia) **M Murić** | **7^{7}** | **7^{8}**
5 | (United States) K Adams (Netherlands) M Bollegraf | 6^{4} | 6^{6}
4 | (United States) **L Raymond** (France) **N Tauziat** | **7^{7}** | **7**
(Italy) R Grande (Japan) A Sugiyama | 6^{4} | 5
(France) **A Dechaume-Balleret** (France) **S Testud** | 3 | **6** | **6**
7 | (Japan) N Kijimuta (Japan) N Miyagi | **6** | 2 | 0

Quarterfinals
1 | (United States) **G Fernández** (Spain) **A Sánchez Vicario** | **6** | **7^{9}**
WC | (Croatia) I Majoli (Croatia) M Murić | 3 | 6^{7}
4 | (United States) **L Raymond** (France) **N Tauziat** | **6** | **6**
(France) A Dechaume-Balleret (France) S Testud | 2 | 4

Semifinals
1 | (United States) G Fernández (Spain) A Sánchez Vicario | 5 | 2
4 | (United States) **L Raymond** (France) **N Tauziat** | **7** | **6**

=== Bottom half ===
First round
8 | (Spain) C Martínez (Argentina) P Tarabini | **6** | 6^{5} | 5
WC | (United States) **S Williams** (United States) **V Williams** | 4 | **7^{7}** | **7**
Q | (Sweden) **Å Carlsson** (France) **A-G Sidot** | 2 | **7^{7}** | **7^{7}**
(Netherlands) K Boogert (Romania) I Spîrlea | **6** | 6^{4} | 6^{2}
(United States) **A Frazier** (United States) **K Po** | 2 | **6** | **6**
(Italy) S Farina (Austria) B Schett | **6** | 3 | 2
6 | (United States) **M J Fernández** (United States) **C Rubin** | **7** | **6**
(Argentina) F Labat (Germany) B Rittner | 5 | 3
(Romania) **R Dragomir** (Netherlands) **C Vis** | **7^{7}** | **7^{7}**
(Australia) K-A Guse (South Africa) R Nideffer | 6^{4} | 6^{4}
(Russia) **A Kournikova** (Russia) **E Likhovtseva** | **6** | **6**
(United States) A Lettiere (United States) C Morariu | 1 | 1

Second round
WC | (United States) **S Williams** (United States) **V Williams** | 0 | **6** | **6**
Q | (Sweden) Å Carlsson (France) A-G Sidot | **6** | 3 | 3
(United States) A Frazier (United States) K Po | 1 | 1
3 | (United States) **L Davenport** (Belarus) **N Zvereva** | **6** | **6**
6 | (United States) **M J Fernández** (United States) **C Rubin** | **6** | **6**
(Romania) R Dragomir (Netherlands) C Vis | 1 | 1
(Russia) **A Kournikova** (Russia) **E Likhovtseva** | **7** | 4 | **6**
2 | (Latvia) L Neiland (Czech Republic) H Suková | 5 | **6** | 3

Quarterfinals
WC | (United States) S Williams (United States) V Williams | 3 | 0
3 | (United States) **L Davenport** (Belarus) **N Zvereva** | **6** | **6**
6 | (United States) **M J Fernández** (United States) **C Rubin** | 2 | **6** | **7**
(Russia) A Kournikova (Russia) E Likhovtseva | **6** | 4 | 5

Semifinals
3 | (United States) **L Davenport** (Belarus) **N Zvereva** | **6** | **6**
6 | (United States) M J Fernández (United States) C Rubin | 1 | 0
