= 1997 U.S. Men's Clay Court Championships – Doubles =

Doubles
- 1997 U.S. Men's Clay Court Championships

Final
- Champions: (The Bahamas) Mark Merklein (United States) Vincent Spadea
- Runners-up: (United States) Alex O'Brien (United States) Jeff Salzenstein
- Score: 6–4, 4–6, 6–4

Details
- Draw: 16
- Seeds: 4

Events
| Singles | Doubles |
- U.S. Men's Clay Court Championships

Pat Cash and Patrick Rafter were the defending champions, but lost in the quarterfinals this year.

Mark Merklein and Vincent Spadea won the title, defeating Alex O'Brien and Jeff Salzenstein 6–4, 4–6, 6–4 in the final.

== Seeds ==
1. (Zimbabwe) Byron Black / (Canada) Grant Connell (first round)
2. (Australia) Sandon Stolle / (Czech Republic) Cyril Suk (semifinals)
3. (United States) Scott Davis / (United States) Kelly Jones (first round)
4. (Netherlands) Tom Kempers / (Netherlands) Tom Nijssen (quarterfinals)

== Draw ==
Key

- Q = Qualifier
- WC = Wild card
- LL = Lucky loser
- Alt = Alternate
- ITF = ITF entry
- PR = Protected ranking
- SR = Special ranking
- SE = Special exempt
- JE = Junior exempt
- JR = Junior Accelerator Programme entrant
- CO = College Accelerator Programme entrant
- NG = Next Gen Accelerator Program entrant
- w/o = Walkover
- r = Retired
- d = Defaulted

=== Draw ===
First round
1 | (Zimbabwe) B Black (Canada) G Connell | 6 | 1 | 5
(South Africa) M Ondruska (South Africa) G Stafford | 3 | 6 | 7
WC | (The Bahamas) M Merklein (United States) V Spadea | 2 | 6 | 7
(United States) M Keil (United States) C Woodruff | 6 | 4 | 6
3 | (United States) S Davis (United States) K Jones | 5 | 3
Q | (Zimbabwe) W Black (Venezuela) M Ruah | 7 | 6
(Venezuela) N Pereira (France) G Raoux | 3 | 6 | 7
(Australia) P Kilderry (United States) K Kinnear | 6 | 4 | 6
(Czech Republic) P Korda (New Zealand) B Steven | 6 | 3
WC | (United States) A O'Brien (United States) J Salzenstein | 7 | 6
(Argentina) L Arnold (Brazil) F Meligeni | 2 | 4
4 | (Netherlands) T Kempers (Netherlands) T Nijssen | 6 | 6
WC | (United States) L Jensen (United States) M Jensen | 6 | 6
(Sweden) R Bergh (South Africa) C van Rensburg | 1 | 4
(Argentina) J Frana (Czech Republic) D Rikl | 6 | 2
2 | (Australia) S Stolle (Czech Republic) C Suk | 7 | 6

Quarterfinals
(South Africa) M Ondruska (South Africa) G Stafford | 4 | 2
WC | (The Bahamas) M Merklein (United States) V Spadea | 6 | 6
Q | (Zimbabwe) W Black (Venezuela) M Ruah | 6 | 6 | 7
(Venezuela) N Pereira (France) G Raoux | 2 | 7 | 5
WC | (United States) A O'Brien (United States) J Salzenstein | 7 | 7
4 | (Netherlands) T Kempers (Netherlands) T Nijssen | 6 | 6
WC | (United States) L Jensen (United States) M Jensen | 6 | 4
2 | (Australia) S Stolle (Czech Republic) C Suk | 7 | 6

Semifinals
WC | (The Bahamas) M Merklein (United States) V Spadea | 6 | 6
Q | (Zimbabwe) W Black (Venezuela) M Ruah | 3 | 3
WC | (United States) A O'Brien (United States) J Salzenstein | 6 | 6 | 6
2 | (Australia) S Stolle (Czech Republic) C Suk | 4 | 7 | 3

Final
WC | (The Bahamas) M Merklein (United States) V Spadea | 6 | 4 | 6
WC | (United States) A O'Brien (United States) J Salzenstein | 4 | 6 | 4
