= 1998 State Farm Evert Cup – Singles =

Singles
- 1998 Newsweek Champions Cup and the State Farm Evert Cup
- 1997 Champion: (United States) Lindsay Davenport

Final
- Champion: (Switzerland) Martina Hingis
- Runner-up: (United States) Lindsay Davenport
- Score: 6–3, 6–4

Events
Singles	men	women
Doubles	men	women
- Newsweek Champions Cup State Farm Evert Cup

Martina Hingis defeated the defending champion Lindsay Davenport in the final, 6–3, 6–4 to win the women's singles tennis title at the 1998 Indian Wells Masters.

== Seeds ==
A champion seed is indicated in bold text while text in italics indicates the round in which that seed was eliminated. The top eight seeds received a bye to the second round.

1. (Switzerland) **Martina Hingis (champion)**
2. (United States) Lindsay Davenport (final)
3. (Germany) Steffi Graf (semifinals)
4. (South Africa) Amanda Coetzer (third round)
5. (Spain) Conchita Martínez (quarterfinals)
6. (Romania) Irina Spîrlea (third round)
7. (France) Nathalie Tauziat (second round)
8. (United States) Venus Williams (semifinals)
9. (France) Sandrine Testud (third round)
10. (Belgium) Dominique Van Roost (third round)
11. (Japan) Ai Sugiyama (third round)
12. (Belgium) ~~Sabine Appelmans~~ (withdrew)
13. (Romania) Ruxandra Dragomir (third round)
14. (Netherlands) Brenda Schultz-McCarthy (first round)
15. (Belarus) Natasha Zvereva (quarterfinals)
16. (Russia) Anna Kournikova (third round)
17. (South Africa) Joannette Kruger (quarterfinals)

== Draw ==
Key

- Q = Qualifier
- WC = Wild card
- LL = Lucky loser
- Alt = Alternate
- ITF = ITF entry
- PR = Protected ranking
- SR = Special ranking
- SE = Special exempt
- JE = Junior exempt
- JR = Junior Accelerator Programme entrant
- CO = College Accelerator Programme entrant
- NG = Next Gen Accelerator Program entrant
- w/o = Walkover
- r = Retired
- d = Defaulted

=== Finals ===
Semifinals
1	(Switzerland) **Martina Hingis**	**6**	**7**
8	(United States) Venus Williams	0	6
3	(Germany) Steffi Graf	4	**6**	2/r
2	(United States) **Lindsay Davenport**	**6**	4	**4**

Final
1	(Switzerland) **Martina Hingis**	**6**	**6**
2	(United States) Lindsay Davenport	3	4

=== Top half ===
==== Section 1 ====
First round
(France) A Fusai	4	3
(France) **S Pitkowski**	**6**	**6**
(Argentina) **F Labat**	**6**	3	**6**
Q	(Latvia) L Neiland	2	**6**	1
(Germany) **M Babel**	6	**6**	**7**
14	(Netherlands) B Schultz-McCarthy	**7**	3	6
16	(Russia) **A Kournikova**	3	**6**	**6**
Q	(France) A Dechaume-Balleret	**6**	4	0
(Russia) E Likhovtseva	**6**	3	6
(United States) **C Rubin**	3	**6**	**7**
(Venezuela) **M Vento**	**6**	**6**
Q	(Australia) K Kunce	3	4

Second round
1	(Switzerland) **M Hingis**	**6**	**6**
(France) S Pitkowski	2	1
(Argentina) F Labat	**6**	1	4
(Germany) **M Babel**	4	**6**	**6**
16	(Russia) **A Kournikova**	3	**6**	**7**
(United States) C Rubin	**6**	2	6
(Venezuela) M Vento	**7**	5	3
5	(Spain) **C Martínez**	6	**7**	**6**

Third round
1	(Switzerland) **M Hingis**	**6**	**6**
(Germany) M Babel	2	0
16	(Russia) A Kournikova	3	4
5	(Spain) **C Martínez**	**6**	**6**

Quarterfinals
1	(Switzerland) **M Hingis**	**6**	**7**
5	(Spain) C Martínez	1	5

==== Section 2 ====
First round
WC	(United States) S Taylor	1	1
Q	(United States) **A Miller**	**6**	**6**
(Italy) R Grande	**7**	3	6
(Austria) **B Schett**	6	**6**	**7**
(Australia) R McQuillan	0	**6**	5
17	(South Africa) **J Kruger**	**6**	1	**7**
10	(Belgium) **D Van Roost**	**6**	**6**
(United States) C Morariu	1	3
(Austria) **B Paulus**	**6**	1	**7**
(Indonesia) Y Basuki	4	**6**	5
(Czech Republic) S Kleinová	0	2
(Italy) **S Farina**	**6**	**6**

Second round
4	(South Africa) **A Coetzer**	**6**	**6**
Q	(United States) A Miller	3	3
(Austria) B Schett	4	3
17	(South Africa) **J Kruger**	**6**	**6**
10	(Belgium) **D Van Roost**	**6**	**6**
(Austria) B Paulus	4	0
(Italy) S Farina	3	1
8	(United States) **V Williams**	**6**	**6**

Third round
4	(South Africa) A Coetzer	**6**	4	4
17	(South Africa) **J Kruger**	2	**6**	**6**
10	(Belgium) D Van Roost	4	1
8	(United States) **V Williams**	**6**	**6**

Quarterfinals
17	(South Africa) J Kruger	1	3
8	(United States) **V Williams**	**6**	**6**

=== Bottom half ===
==== Section 3 ====
First round
(China) **F Li**	**6**	**6**
(Belarus) O Barabanschikova	4	1
(Japan) **N Sawamatsu**	**6**	4	**6**
(Croatia) M Lučić	2	**6**	3
LL	(Canada) S Jeyaseelan	2	4
15	(Belarus) **N Zvereva**	**6**	**6**
11	(Japan) **A Sugiyama**	**6**	**6**
LL	(Australia) K-A Guse	3	3
WC	(United States) L Osterloh	5	0
Q	(United States) **T Snyder**	**7**	**6**
(Thailand) **T Tanasugarn**	**6**	4	**7**
(Spain) M Sánchez Lorenzo	1	**6**	5

Second round
6	(Romania) **I Spîrlea**	**7**	**6**
(China) F Li	5	2
(Japan) N Sawamatsu	4	3
15	(Belarus) **N Zvereva**	**6**	**6**
11	(Japan) **A Sugiyama**	**6**	4	**6**
Q	(United States) T Snyder	1	**6**	1
(Thailand) T Tanasugarn	4	1
3	(Germany) **S Graf**	**6**	**6**

Third round
6	(Romania) I Spîrlea	3	5
15	(Belarus) **N Zvereva**	**6**	**7**
11	(Japan) A Sugiyama	0	1
3	(Germany) **S Graf**	**6**	**6**

Quarterfinals
15	(Belarus) N Zvereva	3	0
3	(Germany) **S Graf**	**6**	**6**

==== Section 4 ====
First round
(United States) **S Cacic**	**6**	**6**
Q	(Romania) C Cristea	1	1
(France) **J Halard-Decugis**	**6**	**6**
(Sweden) Å Carlsson	0	2
(Spain) M Serna	4	**6**	5
9	(France) **S Testud**	**6**	4	**7**
13	(Romania) **R Dragomir**	**6**	**6**
WC	(Zimbabwe) C Black	3	3
Q	(Russia) **T Panova**	1	**6**	**6**
Q	(Netherlands) K Boogert	**6**	4	1
(United States) **A Frazier**	**6**	**6**
LL	(Italy) F Lubiani	4	1

Second round
7	(France) N Tauziat	**6**	2	5
(United States) **S Cacic**	1	**6**	**7**
(France) J Halard-Decugis	3	**6**	4
9	(France) **S Testud**	**6**	1	**6**
13	(Romania) **R Dragomir**	5	**6**	**6**
Q	(Russia) T Panova	**7**	0	0
(United States) A Frazier	3	1
2	(United States) **L Davenport**	**6**	**6**

Third round
(United States) **S Cacic**	4	**7**	**7**
9	(France) S Testud	**6**	6	6
13	(Romania) R Dragomir	2	2
2	(United States) **L Davenport**	**6**	**6**

Quarterfinals
(United States) S Cacic	1	5
2	(United States) **L Davenport**	**6**	**7**

== Qualifying ==
=== Seeds ===
1. (Japan) Miho Saeki (first round)
2. (Australia) Kerry-Anne Guse (qualifying competition, lucky loser)
3. n/a
4. (Japan) Yuka Yoshida (first round)
5. (United States) **Annie Miller (qualified)**
6. (Italy) Francesca Lubiani (qualifying competition, lucky loser)
7. (Canada) Patricia Hy-Boulais (first round)
8. (Japan) Naoko Kijimuta (first round)
9. (France) **Alexia Dechaume-Balleret (qualified)**

=== Qualifiers ===
1. **(United States) Tara Snyder**
2. **(Australia) Kristine Kunce**
3. **(France) Alexia Dechaume-Balleret**
4. **(United States) Annie Miller**
5. **(Latvia) Larisa Neiland**
6. **(Russia) Tatiana Panova**
7. **(Romania) Cătălina Cristea**
8. **(Netherlands) Kristie Boogert**

=== Lucky losers ===
1. **(Australia) Kerry-Anne Guse**
2. **(Italy) Francesca Lubiani**
3. **(Canada) Sonya Jeyaseelan**

=== Qualifying draw ===
==== First qualifier ====
First round				Qualifying competition
1	(Japan) Miho Saeki	3	3
	**(United States) Tara Snyder**	**6**	**6**	**(United States) Tara Snyder**	5	**6**	**6**
(Germany) Barbara Rittner		6	6	(Chinese Taipei) Janet Lee	**7**	2	0
**(Chinese Taipei) Janet Lee**		**7**	**7**

==== Second qualifier ====
First round					Qualifying competition
WC	**(United States) Alexandra Stevenson**	**6**	**7**
	(Japan) Rika Hiraki	1	6		WC	(United States) Alexandra Stevenson	**7**	6	4
	**(Australia) Kristine Kunce**	2	**6**	**6**		**(Australia) Kristine Kunce**	6	**7**	**6**
8	(Japan) Naoko Kijimuta	**6**	4	3

==== Third qualifier ====
First round					Qualifying competition
9	**(France) Alexia Dechaume-Balleret**	**6**	**6**
Alt	(Czech Republic) Radka Bobková	0	2		9	**(France) Alexia Dechaume-Balleret**	**6**	**6**
WC	**(Colombia) Fabiola Zuluaga**	**6**	3	**6**	WC	(Colombia) Fabiola Zuluaga	2	0
	(Australia) Annabel Ellwood	3	**6**	1

==== Fourth qualifier ====
First round					Qualifying competition
**(Canada) Jana Nejedly**		6	**6**	**6**
(South Korea) Park Sung-hee		**7**	3	2		(Canada) Jana Nejedly	1	1
	(Argentina) Mariana Díaz Oliva	6	1		5	**(United States) Annie Miller**	**6**	**6**
5	**(United States) Annie Miller**	**7**	**6**

==== Fifth qualifier ====
First round					Qualifying competition
7	(Canada) Patricia Hy-Boulais	**7**	4	6
	**(Japan) Haruka Inoue**	5	**6**	**7**	(Japan) Haruka Inoue	1	4
**(Latvia) Larisa Neiland**		**6**	**6**		**(Latvia) Larisa Neiland**	**6**	**6**
(Czech Republic) Lenka Němečková		1	1

==== Sixth qualifier ====
First round				Qualifying competition
	**(Canada) Sonya Jeyaseelan**	**6**	**6**
WC	(United States) Susanna Modric	2	1	(Canada) Sonya Jeyaseelan	0	4
	**(Russia) Tatiana Panova**	**6**	**6**	**(Russia) Tatiana Panova**	**6**	**6**
4	(Japan) Yuka Yoshida	3	4

==== Seventh qualifier ====
First round				Qualifying competition
6	**(Italy) Francesca Lubiani**	**6**	**6**
WC	(Croatia) Dora Krstulović	2	3	6	(Italy) Francesca Lubiani	4	1
**(Romania) Cătălina Cristea**		**6**	**6**		**(Romania) Cătălina Cristea**	**6**	**6**
(Switzerland) Emmanuelle Gagliardi		2	4

==== Eighth qualifier ====
First round					Qualifying competition
(Japan) Nana Miyagi		3	**7**	3
**(Netherlands) Kristie Boogert**		**6**	5	**6**		**(Netherlands) Kristie Boogert**	**6**	**6**
	(France) Lea Ghirardi	2	3		2	(Australia) Kerry-Anne Guse	3	3
2	**(Australia) Kerry-Anne Guse**	**6**	**6**
