= 1999 Newsweek Champions Cup and the Evert Cup =

1999 Newsweek Champions Cup and Evert Cup
- Date: March 5–14
- Edition: 26th
- Category: Super 9 (ATP); Tier I Series (WTA)
- Prize money: $2,200,000
- Surface: Hard / outdoor
- Location: Indian Wells, CA, US
- Venue: Grand Champions Resort

Champions

Men's singles
- (Australia) Mark Philippoussis

Women's singles
- (United States) Serena Williams

Men's doubles
- (Zimbabwe) Wayne Black / (Australia) Sandon Stolle

Women's doubles
- (Switzerland) Martina Hingis / (Russia) Anna Kournikova
| ← 1998 · | Newsweek Champions Cup | · 2000 → |
| ← 1998 · | Evert Cup | · 2000 → |

The 1999 Newsweek Champions Cup and the Evert Cup were tennis tournaments played on outdoor hard courts. It was the 26th edition of the Indian Wells Masters and was part of the Super 9 of the 1999 ATP Tour and of Tier I of the 1999 WTA Tour. Both the men's and women's tournaments took place at the Grand Champions Resort in Indian Wells, California in the United States from March 5 through March 14, 1999.

== Finals ==
=== Men's singles ===
(Australia) Mark Philippoussis defeated (Spain) Carlos Moyá, 5–7, 6–4, 6–4, 4–6, 6–2

- It was Philippoussis' 2nd title of the year and the 10th of his career. It was his 1st Super 9 title.

=== Women's singles ===
(United States) Serena Williams defeated (Germany) Steffi Graf, 6–3, 3–6, 7–5

- It was Williams' 2nd title of the year and the 2nd of her career. It was her 1st Tier I title.

=== Men's doubles ===
(Zimbabwe) Wayne Black / (Australia) Sandon Stolle defeated (South Africa) Ellis Ferreira / (United States) Rick Leach, 7–6^{(7–4)}, 6–3

=== Women's doubles ===
(Switzerland) Martina Hingis / (Russia) Anna Kournikova defeated (United States) Mary Joe Fernández / (Czech Republic) Jana Novotná, 6–2, 6–2

== WTA entrants ==
=== Seeds ===
| Country | Player | Rank | Seed |
|---|---|---|---|
| SUI | Martina Hingis | 1 | 1 |
| USA | Lindsay Davenport | 2 | 2 |
| USA | Monica Seles | 3 | 3 |
| CZE | Jana Novotná | 4 | 4 |
| GER | Steffi Graf | 7 | 5 |
| FRA | Mary Pierce | 8 | 6 |
| RSA | Amanda Coetzer | 9 | 7 |
| FRA | Nathalie Tauziat | 10 | 8 |
| RUS | Anna Kournikova | 11 | 9 |
| SUI | Patty Schnyder | 12 | 10 |
| BEL | Dominique Van Roost | 13 | 11 |
| FRA | Sandrine Testud | 14 | 12 |
| ROU | Irina Spîrlea | 16 | 13 |
| ESP | Conchita Martínez | 17 | 14 |
| BLR | Natasha Zvereva | 18 | 15 |
| AUT | Barbara Schett | 19 | 16 |

=== Other entrants ===
The following players received wildcards into the singles main draw:

- (United States) Alexandra Stevenson
- (United States) Mary Joe Fernández
- (Belarus) Olga Barabanschikova
- (United States) Lilia Osterloh

The following players received wildcards into the doubles main draw:

- (Belarus) Olga Barabanschikova / (Spain) Magüi Serna
- (Germany) Steffi Graf / (Germany) Anke Huber

The following players received entry from the singles qualifying draw:

- (Australia) Alicia Molik
- (United States) Brie Rippner
- (Germany) Barbara Rittner
- (Russia) Tatiana Panova
- (Japan) Miho Saeki
- (Spain) María Sánchez Lorenzo
- (Germany) Andrea Glass
- (South Africa) Jessica Steck

The following players received entry from the doubles qualifying draw:

- (Netherlands) Kristie Boogert / (France) Anne-Gaëlle Sidot
