= 1999 Newsweek Champions Cup – Singles =

Singles
- 1999 Newsweek Champions Cup

Final
- Champion: (Australia) Mark Philippoussis
- Runner-up: (Spain) Carlos Moyá
- Score: 5–7, 6–4, 6–4, 4–6, 6–2

Details
- Draw: 56
- Seeds: 16

Events
Singles	Doubles
- Newsweek Champions Cup

Mark Philippoussis defeated Carlos Moyá in the final, 5–7, 6–4, 6–4, 4–6, 6–2 to win the men's singles tennis title at the 1999 Indian Wells Masters.

Marcelo Ríos was the defending champion, but lost in the third round to Todd Martin.

Moyá attained the ATP world No. 1 ranking for the first time by reaching the final. He became the first Spaniard to be ranked No. 1 by the ATP; Pete Sampras was also in contention for the top ranking.

== Seeds ==
The top eight seeds received a bye into the second round.

1. (United States) Pete Sampras (second round)
2. (Russia) Yevgeny Kafelnikov (second round)
3. (Spain) Álex Corretja (second round)
4. (Spain) Carlos Moyà (final)
5. (Australia) Patrick Rafter (second round)
6. (Chile) Marcelo Ríos (third round)
7. (United Kingdom) Tim Henman (quarterfinals)
8. (Netherlands) Richard Krajicek (quarterfinals)
9. (United States) ~~Andre Agassi~~ (withdrew)
10. (United Kingdom) Greg Rusedski (third round)
11. (United States) Todd Martin (quarterfinals)
12. (Slovakia) Karol Kučera (quarterfinals)
13. (Sweden) Thomas Enqvist (first round)
14. (Croatia) Goran Ivanišević (second round)
15. (Spain) Álbert Costa (first round)
16. (Sweden) Thomas Johansson (second round)

== Draw ==
Key

- Q = Qualifier
- WC = Wild card
- LL = Lucky loser
- Alt = Alternate
- ITF = ITF entry
- PR = Protected ranking
- SR = Special ranking
- SE = Special exempt
- JE = Junior exempt
- JR = Junior Accelerator Programme entrant
- CO = College Accelerator Programme entrant
- NG = Next Gen Accelerator Program entrant
- w/o = Walkover
- r = Retired
- d = Defaulted

=== Finals ===
Quarterfinals
Q	(United States) Chris Woodruff	6	1	7
7	(United Kingdom) Tim Henman	1	6	5
(Australia) Mark Philippoussis	3	7	6
11	(United States) Todd Martin	6	5	1
12	(Slovakia) Karol Kučera	4	4
4	(Spain) Carlos Moyá	6	6
8	(Netherlands) Richard Krajicek	4	4
(Brazil) Gustavo Kuerten	6	6

Semifinals
Q	(United States) Chris Woodruff	1	2
(Australia) Mark Philippoussis	6	6
4	(Spain) Carlos Moyà	6	1	6
(Brazil) Gustavo Kuerten	3	6	1

Final
(Australia) Mark Philippoussis	5	6	6	4	6
4	(Spain) Carlos Moyà	7	4	4	6	2

=== Top half ===
==== Section 1 ====
First round
Q	(France) A Di Pasquale	4	4
(Spain) F Mantilla	6	6
(Czech Republic) D Vacek	5	6	5
Q	(United States) C Woodruff	7	4	7
Q	(Netherlands) P Haarhuis	7	6
15	(Spain) Á Costa	5	1
10	(United Kingdom) G Rusedski	6	6
(Czech Republic) P Korda	3	4
(United States) V Spadea	6^{5}	4
(Australia) S Draper	7^{7}	6
(Germany) T Haas	5^{r}
(Morocco) H Arazi	5

Second round
1	(United States) P Sampras	6^{6}	6	3
(Spain) F Mantilla	7^{8}	3	6
Q	(United States) C Woodruff	7^{11}	6
Q	(Netherlands) P Haarhuis	6^{9}	3
10	(United Kingdom) G Rusedski	6	6
(Australia) S Draper	3	3
(Morocco) H Arazi	3	3
7	(United Kingdom) T Henman	6	6

Third round
(Spain) F Mantilla	5	5
Q	(United States) C Woodruff	7	7
10	(United Kingdom) G Rusedski	4	6	4
7	(United Kingdom) T Henman	6	2	6

Quarterfinals
Q	(United States) C Woodruff	6	1	7
7	(United Kingdom) T Henman	1	6	5

==== Section 2 ====
First round
(Australia) M Philippoussis	7^{7}	7^{7}
(Czech Republic) B Ulihrach	6^{5}	6^{4}
(France) N Escudé	6	1	1
WC	(United States) J Gimelstob	2	6	6
(Russia) M Safin	6	6
13	(Sweden) T Enqvist	4	4
11	(United States) T Martin	6	3	6
Q	(Australia) T Woodbridge	4	6	2
(Spain) F Clavet	6	6
(South Africa) W Ferreira	3	2
(France) C Pioline	6	4	6
Q	(Argentina) M Zabaleta	4	6	3

Second round
3	(Spain) Á Corretja	6	5	2
(Australia) M Philippoussis	4	7	6
WC	(United States) J Gimelstob	2	6^{4}
(Russia) M Safin	6	7^{7}
11	(United States) T Martin	6	3	7^{7}
(Spain) F Clavet	2	6	6^{4}
(France) C Pioline	6^{3}	1
6	(Chile) M Ríos	7^{7}	6

Third round
(Australia) M Philippoussis	6	6
(Russia) M Safin	4	3
11	(United States) T Martin	4	6	6
6	(Chile) M Ríos	6	2	2

Quarterfinals
(Australia) M Philippoussis	3	7	6
11	(United States) T Martin	6	5	1

=== Bottom half ===
==== Section 3 ====
First round
(Germany) N Kiefer	6	6
(Argentina) M Puerta	3	2
WC	(Australia) L Hewitt	4	6	6
WC	(Australia) M Woodforde	6	2	4
(Zimbabwe) B Black	4	6	4
12	(Slovakia) K Kučera	6	3	6
14	(Croatia) G Ivanišević	3	6	6
(Spain) A Berasategui	6	3	4
(Italy) D Sanguinetti	1	6	1
WC	(Belgium) X Malisse	6	3	6
WC	(United States) J Courier	7^{7}	6
LL	(Spain) F Vicente	6^{5}	4

Second round
5	(Australia) P Rafter	6^{2}	6	5
(Germany) N Kiefer	7^{7}	3	7
WC	(Australia) L Hewitt	5	3
12	(Slovakia) K Kučera	7	6
14	(Croatia) G Ivanišević	6^{9}	3
WC	(Belgium) X Malisse	7^{11}	6
WC	(United States) J Courier	6^{6}	4
4	(Spain) C Moyà	7^{8}	6

Third round
(Germany) N Kiefer	4	6	4
12	(Slovakia) K Kučera	6	3	6
WC	(Belgium) X Malisse	4	3
4	(Spain) C Moyà	6	6

Quarterfinals
12	(Slovakia) K Kučera	4	4
4	(Spain) C Moyà	6	6

==== Section 4 ====
First round
(United States) J-M Gambill	6	7^{7}
Q	(Czech Republic) J Novák	2	6^{3}
(United States) M Chang	5	3
(Netherlands) J Siemerink	7	6
Q	(Canada) S Lareau	5	2
LL	(Brazil) F Meligeni	7	6
16	(Sweden) T Johansson	6	6
(Australia) J Stoltenberg	2	3
(Netherlands) S Schalken	1	7^{7}	7^{8}
(Sweden) J Björkman	6	6^{4}	6^{6}
(Brazil) G Kuerten	6	6
(Austria) T Muster	2	4

Second round
8	(Netherlands) R Krajicek	6^{3}	7	7
(United States) J-M Gambill	7^{7}	5	5
(Netherlands) J Siemerink	6	2	6
LL	(Brazil) F Meligeni	4	6	4
16	(Sweden) T Johansson	3	3
(Netherlands) S Schalken	6	6
(Brazil) G Kuerten	0	7^{7}	6
2	(Russia) Y Kafelnikov	6	6^{4}	3

Third round
8	(Netherlands) R Krajicek	6	6
(Netherlands) J Siemerink	4	4
(Netherlands) S Schalken	2	3
(Brazil) G Kuerten	6	6

Quarterfinals
8	(Netherlands) R Krajicek	4	4
(Brazil) G Kuerten	6	6
