= 1999 Newsweek Champions Cup – Doubles =

Doubles
- 1999 Newsweek Champions Cup

Final
- Champions: (Zimbabwe) Wayne Black (Australia) Sandon Stolle
- Runners-up: (South Africa) Ellis Ferreira (United States) Rick Leach
- Score: 7–6^{(7–4)}, 6–3

Events
Singles	Doubles
← 1998 ·	Newsweek Champions Cup	· 2000 →

Jonas Björkman and Patrick Rafter were the defending champions, but lost in the second round this year.

Wayne Black and Sandon Stolle won the title, defeating Ellis Ferreira and Rick Leach 7–6^{(7–4)}, 6–3 in the final.

== Seeds ==
1. (India) Mahesh Bhupathi / (India) Leander Paes (semifinals)
2. (Sweden) Jonas Björkman / (Australia) Patrick Rafter (second round)
3. (The Bahamas) Mark Knowles / (Canada) Daniel Nestor (second round)
4. (Australia) Todd Woodbridge / (Australia) Mark Woodforde (second round)
5. (South Africa) Ellis Ferreira / (United States) Rick Leach (final)
6. (Canada) Sébastien Lareau / (United States) Alex O'Brien (first round)
7. (United States) Patrick Galbraith / (Netherlands) Paul Haarhuis (quarterfinals)
8. (South Africa) David Adams / (South Africa) John-Laffnie de Jager (first round)

== Draw ==
=== Key ===
- Q = Qualifier
- WC = Wild card
- LL = Lucky loser
- Alt = Alternate
- ITF = ITF entry
- PR = Protected ranking
- SR = Special ranking
- SE = Special exempt
- JE = Junior exempt
- JR = Junior Accelerator Programme entrant
- CO = College Accelerator Programme entrant
- NG = Next Gen Accelerator Program entrant
- w/o = Walkover
- r = Retired
- d = Defaulted

=== Finals ===
Semifinals
1	(India) Mahesh Bhupathi (India) Leander Paes	3	2
5	(South Africa) Ellis Ferreira (United States) Rick Leach	6	6
(Australia) Andrew Florent (Australia) David Macpherson	6	4
(Zimbabwe) Wayne Black (Australia) Sandon Stolle	7	6

Final
5	(South Africa) Ellis Ferreira (United States) Rick Leach	6^{4}	3
(Zimbabwe) Wayne Black (Australia) Sandon Stolle	7^{7}	6

=== Top half ===
First round
(Spain) T Carbonell (United States) D Johnson	3	4
(South Africa) W Ferreira (South Africa) K Ullyett	6	6
(United Kingdom) N Broad (South Africa) R Koenig	6	6	7
WC	(United States) J Courier (United States) C Woodruff	1	7	6
(Russia) Y Kafelnikov (Czech Republic) D Vacek	4	4
7	(United States) P Galbraith (Netherlands) P Haarhuis	6	6
WC	(Spain) À Corretja (Spain) A Costa	4	5
(Spain) F Roig (Spain) J Sánchez	6	7
(United States) J Grabb (United States) J Palmer	3	6	6
(Zimbabwe) B Black (Australia) J Eagle	6	3	4
WC	(Spain) C Moyá (Russia) M Safin	3	4
5	(South Africa) E Ferreira (United States) R Leach	6	6

Second round
1	(India) M Bhupathi (India) L Paes	6	7
(South Africa) W Ferreira (South Africa) K Ullyett	3	6
(United Kingdom) N Broad (South Africa) R Koenig	6	3	4
7	(United States) P Galbraith (Netherlands) P Haarhuis	4	6	6
3	(The Bahamas) M Knowles (Canada) D Nestor	7	1	5
(Spain) F Roig (Spain) J Sánchez	6	6	7
(United States) J Grabb (United States) J Palmer	1	6	4
5	(South Africa) E Ferreira (United States) R Leach	6	4	6

Quarterfinals
1	(India) M Bhupathi (India) L Paes	7	6
7	(United States) P Galbraith (Netherlands) P Haarhuis	5	4
(Spain) F Roig (Spain) J Sánchez	5	3
5	(South Africa) E Ferreira (United States) R Leach	7	6

Semifinals
1	(India) M Bhupathi (India) L Paes	3	2
5	(South Africa) E Ferreira (United States) R Leach	6	6

=== Bottom half ===
First round
6	(Canada) S Lareau (United States) A O'Brien	3	2
(Australia) A Florent (Australia) D Macpherson	6	6
(United States) F Montana (South Africa) G Stafford	6	6	5
Q	(Argentina) P Albano (Brazil) G Kuerten	7	4	7
(Czech Republic) J Novák (Czech Republic) D Rikl	3	6	6
(United States) J Gimelstob (Czech Republic) C Suk	6	4	2
8	(South Africa) D Adams (South Africa) J-L de Jager	2	6	2
(Zimbabwe) W Black (Australia) S Stolle	6	3	6
(South Africa) C Haggard (Australia) P Tramacchi	6	7
(United States) R Reneberg (United States) J Stark	4	6
Q	(United States) P Goldstein (Philippines) C Mamiit	4	6	1
WC	(United States) B Bryan (United States) M Bryan	6	3	6

Second round
(Australia) A Florent (Australia) D Macpherson	6	7	6
Q	(Argentina) P Albano (Brazil) G Kuerten	7	6	4
(Czech Republic) J Novák (Czech Republic) D Rikl	6	5	6
4	(Australia) T Woodbridge (Australia) M Woodforde	4	7	4
(Zimbabwe) W Black (Australia) S Stolle	6	6
(South Africa) C Haggard (Australia) P Tramacchi	4	3
WC	(United States) B Bryan (United States) M Bryan	6	3	6
2	(Sweden) J Björkman (Australia) P Rafter	4	6	4

Quarterfinals
(Australia) A Florent (Australia) D Macpherson	6	6
(Czech Republic) J Novák (Czech Republic) D Rikl	3	4
(Zimbabwe) W Black (Australia) S Stolle	6	7
WC	(United States) B Bryan (United States) M Bryan	4	5

Semifinals
(Australia) A Florent (Australia) D Macpherson	6	4
(Zimbabwe) W Black (Australia) S Stolle	7	6
