= Jeff Salzenstein =

American tennis player (born 1973)

- Country (sports): United States
- Residence: Englewood, Colorado, United States
- Born: 14 October 1973 (age 52) Peoria, Illinois, United States
- Height: 1.85 m (6 ft 1 in)
- Turned pro: 1996
- Retired: 2007
- Plays: Left-handed (two-handed backhand)
- College: Stanford
- Prize money: $616,017

Singles
- Career record: 16–41
- Career titles: 0
- Highest ranking: No. 100 (7 June 2004)

Grand Slam singles results
- Australian Open: 1R (2004)
- French Open: 1R (2004)
- Wimbledon: 1R (1997, 2004)
- US Open: 2R (1997)

Doubles
- Career record: 18–27
- Career titles: 0
- Highest ranking: No. 68 (3 November 1997)

Grand Slam doubles results
- French Open: 3R (1997)
- Wimbledon: 1R (1997)
- US Open: 2R (1997)
- Last updated on: 27 December 2022.

Jeff “Salzy” Salzenstein (born October 14, 1973) is an American former professional tennis player, performance coach, and keynote speaker. A left-handed competitor, he achieved a career-high ATP singles ranking of world No. 100 in June 2004, becoming the oldest American to break into the top 100 for the first time at age 30 after returning from two career-threatening injuries. His career-high doubles ranking was world No. 68, reached in November 1997.

== Early life ==
Salzenstein is Jewish, was born in Peoria, Illinois, and lived in Englewood, Colorado, outside Denver. His father, Richard, was a tennis coach who introduced him to the sport at an early age.

A gifted all-around athlete, he excelled in basketball, baseball, soccer, and skiing in addition to tennis. At age 12 he won both the U.S. Boys’ 12 National Hard Court Singles and Doubles Championships, defeating future professionals Brian Dunn and Vince Spadea, and earned the tournament’s Sportsmanship Award.

He was ranked No. 1 in Colorado and the Intermountain Section of the USTA in every age category from 1983 to 1991. He received five national sportsmanship awards and held national rankings of No. 4 in Boys 16 singles and No. 2 in Boys 18 singles.

At Cherry Creek High School (Greenwood Village, Colorado) he compiled a 74–6 career record, won multiple state singles titles, and served as team captain.

== Tennis career ==
=== Early career ===
As a sixth-grader, in addition to playing tennis the 12-year-old, five-foot tall, 85 pound Salzenstein was an A student, the president of his sixth-grade class, the editor of its newspaper, and a basketball and soccer player. In 1986 he won the US Boys' 12 National Hard Court Tennis Singles Championship (defeating Brian Dunn and Vince Spadea along the way) and Doubles Championship. He was the 13th double winner in the tournament’s 25-year history, and was also awarded the tournament’s sportsmanship award. That year he also made it to the final, where he lost in a final set tiebreaker, in the 12-and-under National Clay Courts Championship.

In 1990 Salzenstein reached the quarter-finals at the Under-16 Championships, and in 1992 he was ranked second in Under-18 boys in the United States.

He attended Cherry Creek High School (class of 1992) in Greenwood Village, Colorado. As a freshman, Salzenstein played for the No. 1 singles Colorado state title, and as a sophomore he won the title. As a junior, he was 5' 7" tall and weighed 120 pounds, was the team's # 1 singles player, and was runner-up in the state singles championship. He won the singles state title as a senior, and was captain of the school tennis team. In his high school career, his record was 74-6.

=== College career ===
Salzenstein attended Stanford University on a tennis scholarship, earning a degree in economics. He played for Dick Gould, regarded as one of the greatest college tennis coaches of all time.

He played #1 singles his sophomore, junior, and senior years for the Stanford Cardinal, and was named an All-American in tennis two years in a row. He reached the semifinals at the NCAA singles championships in 1995. He won back-to-back team national titles with the team when he was its captain in 1995 and 1996. He was PAC-10 All-Academic in 1994 (second team), and 1995 and 1996 (first team). He was named the Senior Athlete of the Year at Stanford in 1996.

As a freshman, he played No. 5 singles and posted a 22–4 record but struggled with his serve, which he later transformed into a strength through technical and mental work.

By his sophomore year he had moved up to No. 2 singles and helped lead Stanford to the NCAA team finals, where he lost the deciding match. The following season Stanford went undefeated, one of only three perfect seasons in Gould’s career.

A two-time All-American, Salzenstein played No. 1 singles during his junior and senior years and captained Stanford to back-to-back NCAA Team Championships in 1995 and 1996. He reached the semifinals of the 1995 NCAA Singles Championships, was twice named to the PAC-10 All-Academic First Team, and was honored as Stanford’s Senior Athlete of the Year (1996).

=== Professional career ===
Salzenstein turned professional in 1996 and climbed the ATP rankings, winning several Challenger titles and earning victories over multiple top-50 players. In doubles he partnered with Petr Korda to reach the round of 16 at the 1997 French Open, where they held match point against the eventual champions. That year he was named Tennis Week magazine’s Rookie of the Year.

One of his most notable performances came at the 1997 US Open, where he played a nationally televised second-round night match inside Arthur Ashe Stadium against world No. 2 Michael Chang, losing in four sets.

After knee and ankle surgeries before age 24, Salzenstein returned to win Challenger titles in Tallahassee, Urbana, Aptos, and León. In 2004 he reached the semifinals of the ATP Delray Beach International Series event and became the oldest American to debut in the ATP top 100 at age 30.

He finished that season as the 10th-highest-ranked American, with career victories over players including David Nalbandian, Mardy Fish, Fernando González, Fernando Verdasco, and Taylor Dent.

Salzenstein competed in all four Grand Slam tournaments before retiring from full-time professional play at age 33.

== Honors and achievements ==
- Inducted into the Colorado Tennis Hall of Fame (2005)
- Achieved Top 100 ATP Singles and Top 70 ATP Doubles rankings
- Two-time Stanford All-American and NCAA Champion (1995–1996)
- Stanford Senior Athlete of the Year (1996)
- Tennis Week Rookie of the Year (1997)
- Recipient of five national sportsmanship awards
- Represented the United States in all four Grand Slam tournaments

== Post-playing career ==
Salzenstein is a certified nutritional therapist. He is also the founder of JS Performance Tennis School in Denver, Colorado, the CEO of Tennis Evolution, and runs a YouTube tennis coaching channel that goes by the same name. Among others, he has coached Vasilisa Bardina.

== Coaching and business career ==
Salzenstein was inducted into the Colorado Tennis Hall of Fame in 2005. After retiring in 2007, he transitioned into high-performance coaching and entrepreneurship.

In 2011 he founded Tennis Evolution, an online tennis education platform that has reached millions of players worldwide. His instructional videos have received more than 20 million views on YouTube.

He developed the Own Your Zone framework, which teaches leaders, athletes, and teams how to regulate stress, build resilience, and perform under pressure without burnout.

Today Salzenstein works internationally as a motivational leadership and peak-performance speaker, providing training and coaching for CEOs, founders, executive teams, and elite athletes through his company and website.

== ATP career finals ==
=== Doubles: 1 (1 runner-up) ===
| Legend Grand Slam Tournaments (0–0) ATP World Tour Finals (0–0) ATP Masters Series (0–0) ATP Championship Series (0–0) ATP World Series (0–1) | Finals by surface Hard (0–0) Clay (0–1) Grass (0–0) Carpet (0–0) | Finals by setting Outdoors (0–1) Indoors (0–0) |

| Result | W–L | Date | Tournament | Tier | Surface | Partner | Opponents | Score |
|---|---|---|---|---|---|---|---|---|
| Loss | 0–1 | Apr 1997 | Orlando, United States | World Series | Clay | (United States) Alex O'Brien | (The Bahamas) Mark Merklein (United States) Vince Spadea | 4–6, 6–4, 4–6 |

== ATP Challenger and ITF Futures finals ==
=== Singles: 8 (5–3) ===
| Legend ATP Challenger (5–3) ITF Futures (0–0) | Finals by surface Hard (5–2) Clay (0–0) Grass (0–0) Carpet (0–1) |

| Result | W–L | Date | Tournament | Tier | Surface | Opponent | Score |
|---|---|---|---|---|---|---|---|
| Loss | 0–1 | Nov 1996 | Neumünster, Germany | Challenger | Carpet | (Germany) Arne Thoms | 4–6, 4–6 |
| Win | 1–1 | Jun 2000 | Tallahassee, United States | Challenger | Hard | (United States) Kevin Kim | 6–3, 6–2 |
| Win | 2–1 | Dec 2000 | Urbana, United States | Challenger | Hard | (France) Antony Dupuis | 7–6^{(7–4)}, 6–4 |
| Win | 3–1 | Jul 2001 | Aptos, United States | Challenger | Hard | (United States) Jeff Morrison | 7–6^{(7–3)}, 6–4 |
| Loss | 3–2 | Jun 2003 | Atlantic City, United States | Challenger | Hard | (Sweden) Bjorn Rehnquist | 4–6, 4–6 |
| Win | 4–2 | Jul 2003 | Aptos, United States | Challenger | Hard | (Russia) Dmitry Tursunov | 5–7, 7–5, 6–4 |
| Loss | 4–3 | Aug 2003 | Denver, United States | Challenger | Hard | (United Kingdom) Arvind Parmar | 4–6, 4–6 |
| Win | 5–3 | Apr 2004 | León, Mexico | Challenger | Hard | (South Africa) Wesley Moodie | 6–3, 3–6, 7–5 |

=== Doubles: 9 (6–3) ===
| Legend ATP Challenger (6–3) ITF Futures (0–0) | Finals by surface Hard (5–3) Clay (1–0) Grass (0–0) Carpet (0–0) |

| Result | W–L | Date | Tournament | Tier | Surface | Partner | Opponents | Score |
|---|---|---|---|---|---|---|---|---|
| Win | 1–0 | Aug 1996 | Binghamton, United States | Challenger | Hard | (United States) Justin Gimelstob | (United States) David DiLucia (United States) Kenny Thorne | 6–2, 6–4 |
| Loss | 1–1 | Dec 1996 | Amarillo, United States | Challenger | Hard | (United States) Justin Gimelstob | (Belarus) Max Mirnyi (Zimbabwe) Kevin Ullyett | 3–6, 4–6 |
| Win | 2–1 | Dec 1996 | Daytona Beach, United States | Challenger | Hard | (United States) Justin Gimelstob | (United States) Chad Clark (The Bahamas) Mark Merklein | 7–6, 3–6, 7–5 |
| Win | 3–1 | May 1997 | Dresden, Germany | Challenger | Clay | (The Bahamas) Mark Merklein | (Philippines) Cecil Mamiit (Venezuela) Jimy Szymanski | 7–6, 6–1 |
| Win | 4–1 | Aug 1997 | Binghamton, United States | Challenger | Hard | (United States) Brian MacPhie | (Portugal) Emanuel Couto (Egypt) Tamer El Sawy | 7–5, 6–7, 6–3 |
| Win | 5–1 | Oct 1997 | San Antonio, United States | Challenger | Hard | (United States) Doug Flach | (United States) Chad Clark (United States) Brandon Hawk | 4–6, 6–2, 6–1 |
| Loss | 5–2 | Nov 1999 | Puebla, Mexico | Challenger | Hard | (United States) Jim Thomas | (Mexico) Oscar Ortiz (Mexico) Marco Osorio | 1–6, 3–6 |
| Win | 6–2 | Mar 2002 | Salinas, Ecuador | Challenger | Hard | (United States) Brandon Coupe | (Argentina) Diego Veronelli (Argentina) Martín Rodríguez | 6–7^{(3–7)}, 6–4, 7–6^{(7–3)} |
| Loss | 6–3 | Sep 2003 | Seoul, South Korea | Challenger | Hard | (United States) Alex Bogomolov Jr. | (United States) Alex Kim (South Korea) Lee Hyung-taik | 6–1, 1–6, 4–6 |

== Performance timeline ==
Key
| W | F | SF | QF | #R | RR | Q# | P# | DNQ | A | Z# | PO | G | S | B | NMS | NTI | P | NH |

(W) winner; (F) finalist; (SF) semifinalist; (QF) quarterfinalist; (#R) rounds 4, 3, 2, 1; (RR) round-robin stage; (Q#) qualification round; (P#) preliminary round; (DNQ) did not qualify; (A) absent; (Z#) Davis/Fed Cup Zonal Group (with number indication) or (PO) play-off; (G) gold, (S) silver or (B) bronze Olympic/Paralympic medal; (NMS) not a Masters tournament; (NTI) not a Tier I tournament; (P) postponed; (NH) not held; (SR) strike rate (events won / competed); (W–L) win–loss record.

=== Singles ===
| Tournament | 1995 | 1996 | 1997 | 1998 | 1999 | 2000 | 2001 | 2002 | 2003 | 2004 | 2005 | 2006 | 2007 | SR | W–L | Win % |
|---|---|---|---|---|---|---|---|---|---|---|---|---|---|---|---|---|
Grand Slam tournaments
| Australian Open | A | A | Q1 | A | A | A | Q2 | Q1 | Q3 | 1R | Q2 | Q2 | A | 0 / 1 | 0–1 | 0% |
| French Open | A | A | Q1 | A | A | A | A | Q3 | Q2 | 1R | Q1 | A | A | 0 / 1 | 0–1 | 0% |
| Wimbledon | A | A | 1R | A | A | Q1 | Q3 | Q1 | Q2 | 1R | A | A | A | 0 / 2 | 0–2 | 0% |
| US Open | Q2 | Q3 | 2R | A | A | Q1 | Q1 | Q1 | 1R | Q2 | A | A | A | 0 / 2 | 1–2 | 33% |
| Win–loss | 0–0 | 0–0 | 1–2 | 0–0 | 0–0 | 0–0 | 0–0 | 0–0 | 0–1 | 0–3 | 0–0 | 0–0 | 0–0 | 0 / 6 | 1–6 | 14% |
ATP Tour Masters 1000
| Indian Wells | A | A | A | Q2 | A | A | A | A | A | 1R | 1R | 1R | Q1 | 0 / 3 | 0–3 | 0% |
| Miami | Q3 | Q2 | 2R | 1R | Q2 | A | Q1 | Q1 | A | 1R | Q2 | A | A | 0 /3 | 1–3 | 25% |
| Canada | A | A | A | A | A | A | Q1 | Q1 | A | Q1 | A | A | A | 0 / 0 | 0–0 | – |
| Cincinnati | A | A | A | A | A | Q2 | Q1 | A | Q2 | Q2 | A | A | A | 0 / 0 | 0–0 | – |
| Win–loss | 0–0 | 0–0 | 1–1 | 0–1 | 0–0 | 0–0 | 0–0 | 0–0 | 0–0 | 0–2 | 0–1 | 0–1 | 0–0 | 0 / 6 | 1–6 | 14% |

== See also ==
- List of select Jewish tennis players
