= 1998 Newsweek Champions Cup and the State Farm Evert Cup =

1998 Newsweek Champions Cup and State Farm Evert Cup
- Date: March 5–15
- Edition: 25th
- Category: Super 9 (ATP); Tier I Series (WTA)
- Prize money: $2,200,000
- Surface: Hard / outdoor
- Location: Indian Wells, CA, US
- Venue: Grand Champions Resort

Champions

Men's singles
- (Chile) Marcelo Ríos

Women's singles
- (Switzerland) Martina Hingis

Men's doubles
- (Sweden) Jonas Björkman / (Australia) Patrick Rafter

Women's doubles
- (United States) Lindsay Davenport / (Belarus) Natasha Zvereva
← 1997 ·	Newsweek Champions Cup	· 1999 →
← 1997 ·	State Farm Evert Cup	· 1999 →

The 1998 Newsweek Champions Cup and the State Farm Evert Cup were tennis tournaments played on outdoor hard courts. It was the 25th edition of the Indian Wells Masters and was part of the Super 9 of the 1998 ATP Tour and of Tier I of the 1998 WTA Tour. Both the men's and women's tournaments took place at the Grand Champions Resort in Indian Wells, California in the United States from March 5 through March 15, 1998.

== Finals ==
=== Men's singles ===
(Chile) Marcelo Ríos defeated (United Kingdom) Greg Rusedski 6–3, 6–7^{(15–17)}, 7–6^{(7–4)}, 6–4

- It was Ríos' 2nd title of the year and the 8th of his career. It was his 1st Super 9 title of the year and his 2nd overall.

=== Women's singles ===
(Switzerland) Martina Hingis defeated (United States) Lindsay Davenport 6–3, 6–4

- It was Hingis' 2nd title of the year and the 30th of her career. It was her 1st Tier I title of the year and her 4th overall.

=== Men's doubles ===
(Sweden) Jonas Björkman / (Australia) Patrick Rafter defeated (United States) Todd Martin / (United States) Richey Reneberg 6–4, 7–6

- It was Björkman's 2nd title of the year and the 18th of his career. It was Rafter's 2nd title of the year and the 9th of his career.

=== Women's doubles ===
(United States) Lindsay Davenport / (Belarus) Natasha Zvereva defeated (France) Alexandra Fusai / (France) Nathalie Tauziat 6–4, 2–6, 6–4

- It was Davenport's 2nd title of the year and the 33rd of her career. It was Zvereva's 1st title of the year and the 74th of her career.
