= 2003 NASDAQ-100 Open =

- Date: March 17 – 30
- Edition: 19th
- Category: ATP Masters Series (men); Tier I Series (women)
- Surface: Hard / Outdoor
- Location: Key Biscayne, Florida, U.S.
- Venue: Tennis Center at Crandon Park

Champions

Men's singles
- (United States) Andre Agassi

Women's singles
- (United States) Serena Williams

Men's doubles
- (Switzerland) Roger Federer / (Belarus) Max Mirnyi

Women's doubles
- (South Africa) Liezel Huber / (Bulgaria) Magdalena Maleeva
- Miami Open

The 2003 NASDAQ-100 Open was a tennis tournament played on outdoor hard courts. It was the 19th edition of the Miami Masters and was part of the Tennis Masters Series of the 2003 ATP Tour and of Tier I of the 2003 WTA Tour. Both the men's and women's events took place at the Tennis Center at Crandon Park in Key Biscayne, Florida in the United States from March 17 through March 30, 2003.

== Finals ==
=== Men's singles ===
(United States) Andre Agassi defeated (Spain) Carlos Moyá 6–3, 6–3

- It was Agassi's 3rd title of the year and the 58th of his career. It was his 1st Masters title of the year and his 16th overall. It was his 6th title at the event having also won in 1990, 1995, 1996, 2001 and 2002.

=== Women's singles ===
(United States) Serena Williams defeated (United States) Jennifer Capriati 4–6, 6–4, 6–1

- It was Williams' 3rd title of the year and the 35th of her career. It was her 1st Tier I title of the year and her 6th overall. It was her 2nd title at the event after winning in 2002.

=== Men's doubles ===
(Switzerland) Roger Federer / (Belarus) Max Mirnyi defeated (India) Leander Paes / (Czech Republic) David Rikl 7–5, 6–3

- It was Federer's 3rd title of the year and the 11th of his career. It was Mirnyi's 2nd title of the year and the 15th of his career.

=== Women's doubles ===
(South Africa) Liezel Huber / (Bulgaria) Magdalena Maleeva defeated (Japan) Shinobu Asagoe / (Japan) Nana Miyagi 6–4, 3–6, 7–5

- It was Huber's 1st title of the year and the 5th of her career. It was Maleeva's 1st title of the year and the 12th of her career.
