= 2000 Ericsson Open =

- Date: March 23 – April 2
- Edition: 16th
- Category: ATP Masters Series (men); Tier I Series (women)
- Surface: Hard / outdoor
- Location: Key Biscayne, Florida, U.S.
- Venue: Tennis Center at Crandon Park

Champions

Men's singles
- (United States) Pete Sampras

Women's singles
- (Switzerland) Martina Hingis

Men's doubles
- (Australia) Todd Woodbridge / (Australia) Mark Woodforde

Women's doubles
- (France) Julie Halard-Decugis / (Japan) Ai Sugiyama
← 1999 ·	Miami Open	· 2001 →

The 2000 Ericsson Open was the 16th edition of this tennis tournament and was played on outdoor hard courts. The tournament was part of the ATP Masters Series of the 2000 ATP Tour and was classified as a Tier I event on the 2000 WTA Tour. Both the men's and the women's events took place at the Tennis Center at Crandon Park in Key Biscayne, Florida, United States, from March 23 through April 2, 2000.

== Finals ==
=== Men's singles ===
(United States) Pete Sampras defeated (Brazil) Gustavo Kuerten 6–1, 6–7^{(2–7)}, 7–6^{(7–5)}, 7–6^{(10–8)}

- It was Pete Sampras's first title of the year and his 62nd overall. It was his first Masters title of the year and his eleventh overall. It was his third title at this event, also winning in 1993 and 1994.

=== Women's singles ===
(Switzerland) Martina Hingis defeated (United States) Lindsay Davenport 6–3, 6–2

- It was Martina Hingis's second title of the year and her 28th overall. It was her second Tier I title of the year and her eleventh overall. It was her second title at this event, also winning in 1997.

=== Men's doubles ===
(Australia) Todd Woodbridge / (Australia) Mark Woodforde defeated (Czech Republic) Martin Damm / (Slovakia) Dominik Hrbatý 6–3, 6–4

=== Women's doubles ===
(France) Julie Halard-Decugis / (Japan) Ai Sugiyama defeated (United States) Nicole Arendt / (Netherlands) Manon Bollegraf 4–6, 7–5, 6–4
