= 2002 NASDAQ-100 Open =

- Date: March 18 – 31
- Edition: 18th
- Category: ATP Masters Series (men); Tier I Series (women)
- Surface: Hard / outdoor
- Location: Key Biscayne, Florida, U.S.
- Venue: Tennis Center at Crandon Park

Champions

Men's singles
- (United States) Andre Agassi

Women's singles
- (United States) Serena Williams

Men's doubles
- (The Bahamas) Mark Knowles / (Canada) Daniel Nestor

Women's doubles
- (United States) Lisa Raymond / (Australia) Rennae Stubbs
- Miami Open

The 2002 NASDAQ-100 Open was a tennis tournament played on outdoor hard courts. It was the 18th edition of this tournament and was part of the Tennis Masters Series of the 2002 ATP Tour and of Tier I of the 2002 WTA Tour. Both the men's and women's events took place at the Tennis Center at Crandon Park in Key Biscayne, Florida in the United States from March 18 through 31, 2002.

== Finals ==
=== Men's singles ===
(United States) Andre Agassi defeated (Switzerland) Roger Federer 6–3, 6–3, 3–6, 6–4

- It was Agassi's 2nd title of the year and the 52nd of his career. It was his 1st Masters title of the year and his 13th overall. It was his 5th title at the event after winning in 1990, 1995, 1996 and 2001. This was Federer's first Masters final.

=== Women's singles ===
(United States) Serena Williams defeated (United States) Jennifer Capriati 7–5, 7–6^{(7–4)}

- It was Williams' 2nd title of the year and the 23rd of her career. It was her 1st Tier I title of the year and her 4th overall.

=== Men's doubles ===
(The Bahamas) Mark Knowles / (Canada) Daniel Nestor defeated (United States) Donald Johnson / (United States) Jared Palmer 6–3, 3–6, 6–1

- It was Knowles' 4th title of the year and the 21st of his career. It was Nestor's 4th title of the year and the 24th of his career.

=== Women's doubles ===
(United States) Lisa Raymond / (Australia) Rennae Stubbs defeated (Spain) Virginia Ruano Pascual / (Argentina) Paola Suárez 7–6^{(7–4)}, 6–7^{(4–7)}, 6–3

- It was Raymond's 6th title of the year and the 36th of her career. It was Stubbs' 5th title of the year and the 38th of her career.
