= 2002 NASDAQ-100 Open – Men's doubles =

Men's doubles
- 2002 NASDAQ-100 Open

Final
- Champions: (The Bahamas) Mark Knowles (Canada) Daniel Nestor
- Runners-up: (United States) Donald Johnson (United States) Jared Palmer
- Score: 6–3, 3–6, 6–1

Events
Singles	men	women
Doubles	men	women
← 2001 ·	NASDAQ-100 Open	· 2003 →

Jiří Novák and David Rikl were the defending champions but lost in the second round to Chris Haggard and Tom Vanhoudt.

Mark Knowles and Daniel Nestor won in the final 6–3, 3–6, 6–1 against Donald Johnson and Jared Palmer.

== Seeds ==
All sixteen seeded teams received byes into the second round.

1. (United States) Donald Johnson / (United States) Jared Palmer (final)
2. (The Bahamas) Mark Knowles / (Canada) Daniel Nestor (champions)
3. (Czech Republic) Jiří Novák / (Czech Republic) David Rikl (second round)
4. (Sweden) Jonas Björkman / (Australia) Todd Woodbridge (second round)
5. (Zimbabwe) Wayne Black / (Zimbabwe) Kevin Ullyett (third round)
6. (South Africa) Ellis Ferreira / (United States) Rick Leach (second round)
7. (India) Mahesh Bhupathi / (United States) Brian MacPhie (quarterfinals)
8. (United States) Bob Bryan / (United States) Mike Bryan (third round)
9. (Australia) Joshua Eagle / (Australia) Sandon Stolle (quarterfinals)
10. (Czech Republic) Petr Pála / (Czech Republic) Pavel Vízner (second round)
11. (Switzerland) Roger Federer / (Belarus) Max Mirnyi (semifinals)
12. (Czech Republic) Martin Damm / (Germany) David Prinosil (second round)
13. (Sweden) Simon Aspelin / (United States) Jeff Tarango (second round)
14. (France) Julien Boutter / (Netherlands) Sjeng Schalken (third round)
15. (Czech Republic) Radek Štěpánek / (Czech Republic) Cyril Suk (second round)
16. (France) Michaël Llodra / (France) Fabrice Santoro (third round)

== Draw ==
=== Key ===
- Q = Qualifier
- WC = Wild card
- LL = Lucky loser
- Alt = Alternate
- SE = Special exempt
- PR = Protected ranking
- ITF = ITF entry
- JE = Junior exempt
- w/o = Walkover
- r = Retired
- d = Defaulted
- SR = Special ranking

=== Finals ===
Semifinals
1	(United States) Donald Johnson (United States) Jared Palmer	6	7^{7}
(Spain) Àlex Corretja (Spain) Alberto Martín	4	6^{4}
11	(Switzerland) Roger Federer (Belarus) Max Mirnyi	6	3	4
2	(The Bahamas) Mark Knowles (Canada) Daniel Nestor	4	6	6

Final
1	(United States) Donald Johnson (United States) Jared Palmer	3	6	1
2	(The Bahamas) Mark Knowles (Canada) Daniel Nestor	6	3	6

=== Top half ===
==== Section 1 ====
First round
(France) S Grosjean (Germany) N Kiefer	7^{7}	6
(Italy) E Artoni (United States) D Bowen	6^{2}	2
(Australia) M Hill (Czech Republic) D Vacek	6^{5}	6	4
(Morocco) H Arazi (Morocco) Y El Aynaoui	7^{7}	4	6
(United Kingdom) T Henman (Australia) L Hewitt	6	6
(France) A Clément (France) N Escudé	3	4
(Argentina) G Etlis (Argentina) M Rodríguez	3	7^{7}	6
(Ecuador) N Lapentti (Chile) M Ríos	6	6^{1}	3

Second round
1	(United States) D Johnson (United States) J Palmer	6	6
(France) S Grosjean (Germany) N Kiefer	3	4
(Morocco) H Arazi (Morocco) Y El Aynaoui	2	2
16	(France) M Llodra (France) F Santoro	6	6
10	(Czech Republic) P Pála (Czech Republic) P Vízner	6^{7}	4
(United Kingdom) T Henman (Australia) L Hewitt	7^{9}	6
(Argentina) G Etlis (Argentina) M Rodríguez	6	6
6	(South Africa) E Ferreira (United States) R Leach	4	3

Third round
1	(United States) D Johnson (United States) J Palmer	6	7^{7}
16	(France) M Llodra (France) F Santoro	2	6^{4}
(United Kingdom) T Henman (Australia) L Hewitt
(Argentina) G Etlis (Argentina) M Rodríguez	w/o

Quarterfinals
1	(United States) D Johnson (United States) J Palmer	5	7^{7}	6
(Argentina) G Etlis (Argentina) M Rodríguez	7	6^{5}	4

==== Section 2 ====
First round
(Australia) P Hanley (Australia) N Healey	2	4
(Spain) À Corretja (Spain) À Martín	6	6
(Australia) A Florent (Australia) D Macpherson	4	4
(Argentina) L Arnold (Argentina) G Cañas	6	6
(North Macedonia) A Kitinov (Sweden) J Landsberg	6	3	4
(Australia) B Ellwood (Japan) T Shimada	4	6	6
(Spain) A Costa (Russia) M Safin	4	7^{8}	3
(United States) J Gimelstob (India) L Paes	6	6^{6}	6

Second round
4	(Sweden) J Björkman (Australia) T Woodbridge	6	4	6^{5}
(Spain) À Corretja (Spain) A Martín	3	6	7^{7}
(Argentina) L Arnold (Argentina) G Cañas	6	2	6
13	(Sweden) S Aspelin (United States) J Tarango	4	6	4
9	(Australia) J Eagle (Australia) S Stolle	6	6
(Australia) B Ellwood (Japan) T Shimada	3	2
(United States) J Gimelstob (India) L Paes	4	7	6^{5}
8	(United States) B Bryan (United States) M Bryan	6	5	7^{7}

Third round
(Spain) À Corretja (Spain) À Martín	6	6
(Argentina) L Arnold (Argentina) G Cañas	3	4
9	(Australia) J Eagle (Australia) S Stolle	7	4	6
8	(United States) B Bryan (United States) M Bryan	5	6	4

Quarterfinals
(Spain) À Corretja (Spain) A Martín	6	6
9	(Australia) J Eagle (Australia) S Stolle	4	4

=== Bottom half ===
==== Section 3 ====
First round
(Slovakia) D Hrbatý (Czech Republic) P Luxa	7^{7}	3	6
(Czech Republic) T Cibulec (Czech Republic) L Friedl	6^{2}	6	4
(South Africa) W Ferreira (United States) S Humphries	2	6^{4}
(South Africa) J-L de Jager (South Africa) R Koenig	6	7^{7}
(Sweden) P Nyborg (Brazil) A Sá	7	7
WC	(United States) B Baker (United States) B Evans	5	5
(Germany) T Haas (Belgium) X Malisse	4	2
(South Africa) C Haggard (Belgium) T Vanhoudt	6	6

Second round
5	(Zimbabwe) W Black (Zimbabwe) K Ullyett	6	6
(Slovakia) D Hrbatý (Czech Republic) P Luxa	1	2
(South Africa) J-L de Jager (South Africa) R Koenig	7^{7}	4	4
11	(Switzerland) R Federer (Belarus) M Mirnyi	6^{4}	6	6
14	(France) J Boutter (Netherlands) S Schalken	6	7^{7}
(Sweden) P Nyborg (Brazil) A Sá	4	6^{4}
(South Africa) C Haggard (Belgium) T Vanhoudt	2	7^{7}	6
3	(Czech Republic) J Novák (Czech Republic) D Rikl	6	6^{2}	3

Third round
5	(Zimbabwe) W Black (Zimbabwe) K Ullyett	2	1
11	(Switzerland) R Federer (Belarus) M Mirnyi	6	6
14	(France) J Boutter (Netherlands) S Schalken	7^{7}	6^{5}	4
(South Africa) C Haggard (Belgium) T Vanhoudt	6^{5}	7^{7}	6

Quarterfinals
11	(Switzerland) R Federer (Belarus) M Mirnyi	6	7^{7}
(South Africa) C Haggard (Belgium) T Vanhoudt	1	6^{1}

==== Section 4 ====
First round
(South Africa) D Adams (Australia) S Huss	6	7^{7}
(Germany) K Braasch (Russia) A Olhovskiy	3	6^{4}
(Germany) M Kohlmann (Austria) J Knowle	6	6
(Brazil) D Melo (Argentina) D Orsanic	2	3
(South Africa) M Barnard (United States) J Thomas	4	6^{0}
WC	(Croatia) I Ljubičić (France) C Pioline	6	7^{7}
WC	(United States) M Fish (United States) J Morrison	6	6
(Spain) J C Ferrero (Spain) T Robredo	3	1

Second round
7	(India) M Bhupathi (United States) B MacPhie	6	3	6
(South Africa) D Adams (Australia) S Huss	1	6	3
(Germany) M Kohlmann (Austria) J Knowle	7	6^{5}	7^{7}
12	(Czech Republic) M Damm (Germany) D Prinosil	5	7^{7}	6^{3}
15	(Czech Republic) R Štěpánek (Czech Republic) C Suk	6	6^{6}	2
WC	(Croatia) I Ljubičić (France) C Pioline	4	7^{8}	6
WC	(United States) M Fish (United States) J Morrison	7	6^{2}	3
2	(The Bahamas) M Knowles (Canada) D Nestor	5	7^{7}	6

Third round
7	(India) M Bhupathi (United States) B MacPhie	7	4	6
(Germany) M Kohlmann (Austria) J Knowle	5	6	1
WC	(Croatia) I Ljubičić (France) C Pioline	1	6	2
2	(The Bahamas) M Knowles (Canada) D Nestor	6	4	6

Quarterfinals
7	(India) M Bhupathi (United States) B MacPhie	4	4
2	(The Bahamas) M Knowles (Canada) D Nestor	6	6
