= 2002 NASDAQ-100 Open – Women's doubles =

Tennis event

Women's doubles
- 2002 NASDAQ-100 Open

Final
- Champions: (United States) Lisa Raymond (Australia) Rennae Stubbs
- Runners-up: (Spain) Virginia Ruano Pascual (Argentina) Paola Suárez
- Score: 7–6^{(7–4)}, 6–7^{(4–7)}, 6–3

Details
- Draw: 32 (2WC/1Q)
- Seeds: 8

Events
Singles	men	women
Doubles	men	women
← 2001 ·	Miami Open	· 2003 →

Arantxa Sánchez Vicario and Nathalie Tauziat were the defending champions, but Tauziat did not compete in this edition. Sánchez Vicario teamed up with Daniela Hantuchová and lost in first round to Elena Dementieva and Janette Husárová.

Lisa Raymond and Rennae Stubbs won the title, defeating Virginia Ruano Pascual and Paola Suárez 7–6^{(7–4)}, 6–7^{(4–7)}, 6–3 in the final. It was the 32nd title for Raymond and the 36th title for Stubbs in their respective careers. It was also the 6th title for the pair during this season, including other 2 Tier I wins in Tokyo and Indian Wells.

== Seeds ==
1. (United States) Lisa Raymond / (Australia) Rennae Stubbs (champions)
2. (Zimbabwe) Cara Black / (Russia) Elena Likhovtseva (second round)
3. (Spain) Virginia Ruano Pascual / (Argentina) Paola Suárez (final)
4. (Slovakia) Daniela Hantuchová / (Spain) Arantxa Sánchez Vicario (first round)
5. (Federal Republic of Yugoslavia) Jelena Dokic / (Spain) Conchita Martínez (second round)
6. (Switzerland) Martina Hingis / (Russia) Anna Kournikova (quarterfinals, withdrew)
7. (United States) Kimberly Po-Messerli / (Australia) Nicole Pratt (first round)
8. (Slovenia) Tina Križan / (Slovenia) Katarina Srebotnik (first round)

== Draw ==
=== Key ===
- Q = Qualifier
- WC = Wild card
- LL = Lucky loser
- Alt = Alternate
- SE = Special exempt
- PR = Protected ranking
- ITF = ITF entry
- JE = Junior exempt
- w/o = Walkover
- r = Retired
- d = Defaulted
- SR = Special ranking

=== Finals ===
Semifinals
1	(United States) Lisa Raymond (Australia) Rennae Stubbs	6^{4}	7	6
(United States) Nicole Arendt (South Africa) Liezel Huber	7^{7}	5	2
3	(Spain) Virginia Ruano Pascual (Argentina) Paola Suárez	6	6
(Chinese Taipei) Janet Lee (Indonesia) Wynne Prakusya	4	2

Final
1	(United States) Lisa Raymond (Australia) Rennae Stubbs	7^{7}	6^{4}	6
3	(Spain) Virginia Ruano Pascual (Argentina) Paola Suárez	6^{4}	7^{7}	3

=== Top half ===
First round
1	(United States) L Raymond (Australia) R Stubbs	7^{7}	6
(United States) M Navratilova (Belarus) N Zvereva	6^{4}	1
(Switzerland) E Gagliardi (Italy) R Grande	4	6^{5}
(Czech Republic) D Bedáňová (Russia) E Bovina	6	7^{7}
(Belgium) J Henin (United States) M Shaughnessy	6	6
(Germany) B Rittner (Venezuela) M Vento-Kabchi	3	1
(Italy) T Garbin (Czech Republic) K Hrdličková	7	6^{3}	4
5	(Federal Republic of Yugoslavia) J Dokic (Spain) C Martínez	5	7^{7}	6
4	(Slovakia) D Hantuchová (Spain) A Sánchez Vicario	4	6	1
(Russia) E Dementieva (Slovakia) J Husárová	6	4	6
(United States) N Arendt (South Africa) L Huber	4	7^{7}	6
(Japan) A Sugiyama (Ukraine) E Tatarkova	6	6^{2}	2
WC	(United States) CA Avants (Argentina) G Dulko	4	4
(Italy) S Farina Elia (Austria) B Schett	6	6
WC	(United States) M Irvin (United States) A Stevenson	5	2
6	(Switzerland) M Hingis (Russia) A Kournikova	7	6

Second round
1	(United States) L Raymond (Australia) R Stubbs	6	6
(Czech Republic) D Bedáňová (Russia) E Bovina	1	4
(Belgium) J Henin (United States) M Shaughnessy	3	6	6
5	(Federal Republic of Yugoslavia) J Dokic (Spain) C Martínez	6	2	3
(Russia) E Dementieva (Slovakia) J Husárová	2	5
(United States) N Arendt (South Africa) L Huber	6	7
(Italy) S Farina Elia (Austria) B Schett	3	3
6	(Switzerland) M Hingis (Russia) A Kournikova	6	6

Quarterfinals
1	(United States) L Raymond (Australia) R Stubbs	6	6
(Belgium) J Henin (United States) M Shaughnessy	3	2
(United States) N Arendt (South Africa) L Huber	w/o
6	(Switzerland) M Hingis (Russia) A Kournikova

Semifinals
1	(United States) L Raymond (Australia) R Stubbs	6^{4}	7	6
(United States) N Arendt (South Africa) L Huber	7^{7}	5	2

=== Bottom half ===
First round
8	(Slovenia) T Križan (Slovenia) K Srebotnik	3	1
(Argentina) L Montalvo (Argentina) ME Salerni	6	6
Q	(Japan) R Hiraki (Japan) N Miyagi	7^{7}	6
(Belgium) E Callens (Uzbekistan) I Tulyaganova	6^{3}	4
(Slovakia) H Nagyová (Spain) M Serna	2	7	3
(France) N Dechy (United States) M Tu	6	5	6
(Netherlands) K Boogert (Netherlands) M Oremans	4	1
3	(Spain) V Ruano Pascual (Argentina) P Suárez	6	6
7	(United States) K Po-Messerli (Australia) N Pratt	3	7	4
(Australia) E Dominikovic (Australia) R McQuillan	6	5	6
(South Africa) A Coetzer (United States) L McNeil	6	3	4
(United States) K Schlukebir (Argentina) P Tarabini	3	6	6
(Chinese Taipei) J Lee (Indonesia) W Prakusya	7^{7}	6
(Bulgaria) M Maleeva (Sweden) Å Svensson	6^{1}	2
(France) A Fusai (Netherlands) C Vis	2	4
2	(Zimbabwe) C Black (Russia) E Likhovtseva	6	6

Second round
(Argentina) L Montalvo (Argentina) ME Salerni	2	2
Q	(Japan) R Hiraki (Japan) N Miyagi	6	6
(France) N Dechy (United States) M Tu	3	5
3	(Spain) V Ruano Pascual (Argentina) P Suárez	6	7
(Australia) E Dominikovic (Australia) R McQuillan	4	6^{3}
(United States) K Schlukebir (Argentina) P Tarabini	6	7^{7}
(Chinese Taipei) J Lee (Indonesia) W Prakusya	6^{5}	6	7
2	(Zimbabwe) C Black (Russia) E Likhovtseva	7^{7}	4	5

Quarterfinals
Q	(Japan) R Hiraki (Japan) N Miyagi	2	1
3	(Spain) V Ruano Pascual (Argentina) P Suárez	6	6
(United States) K Schlukebir (Argentina) P Tarabini	6	3	5
(Chinese Taipei) J Lee (Indonesia) W Prakusya	4	6	7

Semifinals
3	(Spain) V Ruano Pascual (Argentina) P Suárez	6	6
(Chinese Taipei) J Lee (Indonesia) W Prakusya	4	2

== Qualifying ==
=== Qualifying seeds ===
1. (Switzerland) Patty Schnyder / (Kazakhstan) Irina Selyutina (second round)
2. (Japan) Rika Hiraki / (Japan) Nana Miyagi (qualified)

=== Qualifiers ===
1. (Japan) Rika Hiraki / (Japan) Nana Miyagi

=== Qualifying draw ===
First round
1	(Switzerland) P Schnyder (Kazakhstan) I Selyutina	8
(United States) E deLone (South Africa) N de Villiers	3
(Slovenia) M Matevžič (Slovenia) T Pisnik	1
(Russia) T Panova (Belarus) T Poutchek	8
WC	(United States) M Middleton (United States) B Rippner	4
(United States) S Reeves (Germany) M Weingärtner	8
(Russia) G Fokina (Russia) L Krasnoroutskaya	3
2	(Japan) R Hiraki (Japan) N Miyagi	8

Second round
1	(Switzerland) P Schnyder (Kazakhstan) I Selyutina	5
(Russia) T Panova (Belarus) T Poutchek	8
(United States) S Reeves (Germany) M Weingärtner	3
2	(Japan) R Hiraki (Japan) N Miyagi	8

Qualifying competition
(Russia) T Panova (Belarus) T Poutchek	0	2
2	(Japan) R Hiraki (Japan) N Miyagi	6	6
