= 2003 NASDAQ-100 Open – Women's doubles =

Women's doubles
- 2003 NASDAQ-100 Open

Final
- Champions: (South Africa) Liezel Huber (Bulgaria) Magdalena Maleeva
- Runners-up: (Japan) Shinobu Asagoe (Japan) Nana Miyagi
- Score: 6–4, 3–6, 7–5

Details
- Draw: 32 (3WC/1Q/1LL)
- Seeds: 8

Events
Singles	men	women
Doubles	men	women
← 2002 ·	Miami Open	· 2004 →

Lisa Raymond and Rennae Stubbs were the defending champions, but competed this year with different partners. Raymond teamed up with Lindsay Davenport and were eliminated in second round due to a withdrawal, while Stubbs teamed up with Elena Bovina and lost in first round.

Liezel Huber and Magdalena Maleeva won the title, defeating Shinobu Asagoe and Nana Miyagi 6–4, 3–6, 7–5 in the final. It was the 5th doubles title for Huber and the 3rd doubles title for Maleeva, in their respective careers.

== Seeds ==
1. (Spain) Virginia Ruano Pascual / (Argentina) Paola Suárez (quarterfinals)
2. (Zimbabwe) Cara Black / (Russia) Elena Likhovtseva (second round)
3. (Belgium) Kim Clijsters / (Japan) Ai Sugiyama (quarterfinals, retired)
4. (Russia) Elena Bovina / (Australia) Rennae Stubbs (first round)
5. (Slovakia) Daniela Hantuchová / (United States) Meghann Shaughnessy (first round)
6. (Russia) Elena Dementieva / (Russia) Anna Kournikova (first round)
7. (United States) Lindsay Davenport / (United States) Lisa Raymond (second round, withdrew)
8. (Federal Republic of Yugoslavia) Jelena Dokic / (Russia) Nadia Petrova (second round)

== Draw ==
=== Key ===
- Q = Qualifier
- WC = Wild card
- LL = Lucky loser
- Alt = Alternate
- SE = Special exempt
- PR = Protected ranking
- ITF = ITF entry
- JE = Junior exempt
- w/o = Walkover
- r = Retired
- d = Defaulted
- SR = Special ranking

=== Finals ===
Semifinals
(Russia) Svetlana Kuznetsova (United States) Martina Navratilova	3	5
(South Africa) Liezel Huber (Bulgaria) Magdalena Maleeva	6	7
(Japan) Shinobu Asagoe (Japan) Nana Miyagi	6	6^{2}	6
(Australia) Nicole Pratt (Germany) Barbara Rittner	2	7^{7}	3

Final
(South Africa) Liezel Huber (Bulgaria) Magdalena Maleeva	6	3	7
(Japan) Shinobu Asagoe (Japan) Nana Miyagi	4	6	5

=== Top half ===
First round
1	(Spain) V Ruano Pascual (Argentina) P Suárez	6	2	6
WC	(United States) A Harkleroad (Russia) M Sharapova	1	6	0
(Belgium) E Callens (Sweden) Å Svensson	6	6
(Slovenia) M Matevžič (Paraguay) R Neffa-de los Ríos	3	3
(Spain) M Serna (Netherlands) C Vis	5	3
(Russia) S Kuznetsova (United States) M Navratilova	7	6
(Switzerland) E Gagliardi (Hungary) P Mandula	4	1
7	(United States) L Davenport (United States) L Raymond	6	6
3	(Belgium) K Clijsters (Japan) A Sugiyama	6	6
WC	(United States) L Granville (United States) S Taylor	2	0
(United States) C Rubin (Austria) B Schett	6	5	4
(France) N Dechy (France) É Loit	4	7	6
(South Africa) L Huber (Bulgaria) M Maleeva	7^{7}	6
(Venezuela) M Vento-Kabchi (Indonesia) A Widjaja	6^{0}	1
(Canada) S Jeyaseelan (United States) M Tu	7	6
6	(Russia) E Dementieva (Russia) A Kournikova	5	4

Second round
1	(Spain) V Ruano Pascual (Argentina) P Suárez	6	6
(Belgium) E Callens (Sweden) Å Svensson	4	3
(Russia) S Kuznetsova (United States) M Navratilova	w/o
7	(United States) L Davenport (United States) L Raymond
3	(Belgium) K Clijsters (Japan) A Sugiyama	6	6
(France) N Dechy (France) É Loit	1	0
(South Africa) L Huber (Bulgaria) M Maleeva	6	6
(Canada) S Jeyaseelan (United States) M Tu	1	2

Quarterfinals
1	(Spain) V Ruano Pascual (Argentina) P Suárez	6^{7}	7^{7}	3
(Russia) S Kuznetsova (United States) M Navratilova	7^{9}	6^{5}	6
3	(Belgium) K Clijsters (Japan) A Sugiyama	4	5^{r}
(South Africa) L Huber (Bulgaria) M Maleeva	6	5

Semifinals
(Russia) S Kuznetsova (United States) M Navratilova	3	5
(South Africa) L Huber (Bulgaria) M Maleeva	6	7

=== Bottom half ===
First round
5	(Slovakia) D Hantuchová (United States) M Shaughnessy	2	1
(Japan) S Asagoe (Japan) N Miyagi	6	6
(South Africa) N de Villiers (Australia) T Musgrave	0	4
(Chinese Taipei) J Lee (Indonesia) W Prakusya	6	6
(Czech Republic) D Bedáňová (Uzbekistan) I Tulyaganova	6	6^{6}	6
LL	(Australia) E Dominikovic (United States) M Irvin	2	7^{8}	0
Q	(United States) S Reeves (Venezuela) M Sequera	5	6	6
4	(Russia) E Bovina (Australia) R Stubbs	7	2	4
8	(Federal Republic of Yugoslavia) J Dokic (Russia) N Petrova	6	6
WC	(Greece) E Daniilidou (United States) A Stevenson	2	1
(Italy) S Farina Elia (Italy) T Garbin	6	6
(Russia) E Kulikovskaya (Belarus) T Poutchek	4	4
(Ukraine) T Perebiynis (South Africa) J Steck	1	3
(Australia) N Pratt (Germany) B Rittner	6	6
(Slovenia) T Križan (Slovenia) K Srebotnik	6	6^{4}	3
2	(Zimbabwe) C Black (Russia) E Likhovtseva	2	7^{7}	6

Second round
(Japan) S Asagoe (Japan) N Miyagi	4	6	7^{7}
(Chinese Taipei) J Lee (Indonesia) W Prakusya	6	4	6^{0}
(Czech Republic) D Bedáňová (Uzbekistan) I Tulyaganova	4	2
Q	(United States) S Reeves (Venezuela) M Sequera	6	6
8	(Federal Republic of Yugoslavia) J Dokic (Russia) N Petrova	6	6^{2}	4
(Italy) S Farina Elia (Italy) T Garbin	3	7^{7}	6
(Australia) N Pratt (Germany) B Rittner	6	7^{7}
2	(Zimbabwe) C Black (Russia) E Likhovtseva	3	6^{3}

Quarterfinals
(Japan) S Asagoe (Japan) N Miyagi	6	6
Q	(United States) S Reeves (Venezuela) M Sequera	4	3
(Italy) S Farina Elia (Italy) T Garbin	3	3
(Australia) N Pratt (Germany) B Rittner	6	6

Semifinals
(Japan) S Asagoe (Japan) N Miyagi	6	6^{2}	6
(Australia) N Pratt (Germany) B Rittner	2	7^{7}	3

== Qualifying ==
=== Qualifying seeds ===
1. (Russia) Alina Jidkova / (Russia) Tatiana Panova (first round)
2. (United States) Samantha Reeves / (Venezuela) Milagros Sequera (qualified)

=== Qualifiers ===
1. (United States) Samantha Reeves / (Venezuela) Milagros Sequera

=== Lucky losers ===
1. (Australia) Evie Dominikovic / (United States) Marissa Irvin

=== Qualifying draw ===
First round
1	(Russia) Alina Jidkova (Russia) Tatiana Panova	6
(Hungary) Zsófia Gubacsi (Germany) Martina Müller	8
(Australia) Evie Dominikovic (United States) Marissa Irvin	8
(Germany) Angelika Rösch (Germany) Marlene Weingärtner	2
(Russia) Anastasia Myskina (Kazakhstan) Irina Selyutina	8
WC	(United States) Carly Gullickson (United States) Jamea Jackson	1
(France) Marion Bartoli (Australia) Alicia Molik	6
2	(United States) Samantha Reeves (Venezuela) Milagros Sequera	8

Second round
(Hungary) Zsófia Gubacsi (Germany) Martina Müller	5
(Australia) Evie Dominikovic (United States) Marissa Irvin	8
(Russia) Anastasia Myskina (Kazakhstan) Irina Selyutina	1
2	(United States) Samantha Reeves (Venezuela) Milagros Sequera	8

Qualifying competition
(Australia) Evie Dominikovic (United States) Marissa Irvin	3	3
2	(United States) Samantha Reeves (Venezuela) Milagros Sequera	6	6
