= 2000 Ericsson Open – Women's doubles =

Women's doubles
- 2000 Ericsson Open

Final
- Champions: (France) Julie Halard-Decugis (Japan) Ai Sugiyama
- Runners-up: (United States) Nicole Arendt (Netherlands) Manon Bollegraf
- Score: 4–6, 7–5, 6–4

Events
Singles	men	women
Doubles	men	women
← 1999 ·	Ericsson Open	· 2001 →

Martina Hingis and Jana Novotná were the defending champions, but none of them competed this year. Novotná also retired at the end of the 1999 season.

Julie Halard-Decugis and Ai Sugiyama won the title by defeating Nicole Arendt and Manon Bollegraf 4–6, 7–5, 6–4 in the final. It was the 9th title for Halard-Decugis and the 12th title for Sugiyama in their respective careers. It was also the 2nd title for the pair during the season, after their win in Sydney.

== Seeds ==
A champion seed is indicated in bold text while text in italics indicates the round in which that seed was eliminated. All sixteen seeds received a bye to the second round.

1. (France) Mary Pierce / (United States) Lisa Raymond (quarterfinals)
2. (Russia) Elena Likhovtseva / (United States) Corina Morariu (quarterfinals)
3. (Russia) Anna Kournikova / (Belarus) Natasha Zvereva (second round)
4. (France) Alexandra Fusai / (France) Nathalie Tauziat (quarterfinals)
5. (Romania) Irina Spîrlea / (Netherlands) Caroline Vis (second round)
6. **(France) Julie Halard-Decugis / (Japan) Ai Sugiyama (champions)**
7. (United States) ~~Chanda Rubin~~ / (France) ~~Sandrine Testud~~ (withdrew)
8. (Belgium) Laurence Courtois / (Spain) Arantxa Sánchez Vicario (quarterfinals)
9. (United States) Kimberly Po / (France) Anne-Gaëlle Sidot (third round)
10. (Argentina) Florencia Labat / (Argentina) Patricia Tarabini (second round)
11. (Spain) Virginia Ruano Pascual / (Argentina) Paola Suárez (third round)
12. (Slovenia) Tina Križan / (Slovenia) Katarina Srebotnik (second round)
13. (Zimbabwe) Cara Black / (Kazakhstan) Irina Selyutina (second round)
14. (Sweden) Åsa Carlsson / (France) Émilie Loit (third round)
15. (Australia) Catherine Barclay / (Latvia) Larisa Neiland (second round)
16. (South Africa) Liezel Horn / (Argentina) Laura Montalvo (semifinals)

== Draw ==
=== Key ===
- Q = Qualifier
- WC = Wild card
- LL = Lucky loser
- Alt = Alternate
- SE = Special exempt
- PR = Protected ranking
- ITF = ITF entry
- JE = Junior exempt
- w/o = Walkover
- r = Retired
- d = Defaulted
- SR = Special ranking

=== Finals ===
Quarterfinals
1	(France) Mary Pierce (United States) Lisa Raymond	2	6	2
(Germany) Anke Huber (Austria) Barbara Schett	6	4	6
4	(France) Alexandra Fusai (France) Nathalie Tauziat	2	1
6	(France) Julie Halard-Decugis (Japan) Ai Sugiyama	6	6
8	(Belgium) Laurence Courtois (Spain) Arantxa Sánchez Vicario	5	3
16	(South Africa) Liezel Horn (Argentina) Laura Montalvo	7	6
(United States) Nicole Arendt (Netherlands) Manon Bollegraf	2	6	6
2	(Russia) Elena Likhovtseva (United States) Corina Morariu	6	3	3

Semifinals
(Germany) Anke Huber (Austria) Barbara Schett	2	6^{5}
6	(France) Julie Halard-Decugis (Japan) Ai Sugiyama	6	7^{7}
16	(South Africa) Liezel Horn (Argentina) Laura Montalvo	6^{5}	2
(United States) Nicole Arendt (Netherlands) Manon Bollegraf	7^{7}	6

Final
6	(France) Julie Halard-Decugis (Japan) Ai Sugiyama	4	7	6
(United States) Nicole Arendt (Netherlands) Manon Bollegraf	6	5	4

=== Top half ===
==== Section 1 ====
First round
(Netherlands) K Boogert (Netherlands) M Oremans	2	6	6
(Czech Republic) E Martincová (Bulgaria) E Pampoulova	6	1	4
(Italy) T Garbin (Hungary) K Marosi	6	6
Q	(Spain) G León García (Spain) M Sánchez Lorenzo	2	2
(Romania) C Cristea (Romania) R Dragomir	6	5	1
(Germany) A Huber (Austria) B Schett	3	7	6
(Czech Republic) L Němečková (Japan) Y Yoshida	3	4
(South Africa) A Coetzer (United States) L McNeil	6	6

Second round
1	(France) M Pierce (United States) L Raymond	2	6	6
(Netherlands) K Boogert (Netherlands) M Oremans	6	3	2
(Italy) T Garbin (Hungary) K Marosi	1	4
11	(Spain) V Ruano Pascual (Argentina) P Suárez	6	6
15	(Australia) C Barclay (Latvia) L Neiland	2	0
(Germany) A Huber (Austria) B Schett	6	6
(South Africa) A Coetzer (United States) L McNeil	w/o
7	(United States) C Rubin (France) S Testud

Third round
1	(France) M Pierce (United States) L Raymond	7	4	6
11	(Spain) V Ruano Pascual (Argentina) P Suárez	5	6	2
(Germany) A Huber (Austria) B Schett	3	6	6
(South Africa) A Coetzer (United States) L McNeil	6	3	3

Quarterfinals
1	(France) M Pierce (United States) L Raymond	2	6	2
(Germany) A Huber (Austria) B Schett	6	4	6

==== Section 2 ====
First round
(Poland) M Grzybowska (Austria) P Wartusch	6	6^{4}	1
(Austria) K Kschwendt (Federal Republic of Yugoslavia) S Načuk	4	7^{7}	6
(Spain) RM Andrés Rodríguez (Spain) C Torrens Valero	2	5
(South Africa) S De Beer (South Africa) N de Villiers	6	7
WC	(United States) H Parkinson (United States) B Rippner	4	6	6
(France) A Cocheteux (Slovakia) J Husárová	6	0	3
(Belgium) E Callens (Canada) S Jeyaseelan	6	6
(United States) L Osterloh (Canada) V Webb	4	2

Second round
4	(France) A Fusai (France) N Tauziat	6	6
(Austria) K Kschwendt (Federal Republic of Yugoslavia) S Načuk	0	1
(South Africa) S De Beer (South Africa) N de Villiers	7	7^{12}
10	(Argentina) F Labat (Argentina) P Tarabini	5	6^{10}
13	(Zimbabwe) C Black (Kazakhstan) I Selyutina	6	5	1
WC	(United States) H Parkinson (United States) B Rippner	3	7	6
(Belgium) E Callens (Canada) S Jeyaseelan	5	6^{7}
6	(France) J Halard-Decugis (Japan) A Sugiyama	7	7^{9}

Third round
4	(France) A Fusai (France) N Tauziat	6	6
(South Africa) S De Beer (South Africa) N de Villiers	1	2
WC	(United States) H Parkinson (United States) B Rippner	3	6^{2}
6	(France) J Halard-Decugis (Japan) A Sugiyama	6	7^{7}

Quarterfinals
4	(France) A Fusai (France) N Tauziat	2	1
6	(France) J Halard-Decugis (Japan) A Sugiyama	6	6

=== Bottom half ===
==== Section 3 ====
First round
(Belgium) K Clijsters (Australia) A Molik	6	4	2
(United States) A Frazier (United States) K Schlukebir	3	6	6
(Indonesia) Y Basuki (Thailand) T Tanasugarn	2	7	6
(United States) M Shaughnessy (United States) L Wild	6	5	3
(Australia) A Ellwood (Australia) L McShea	6	6
(Belgium) S Appelmans (Italy) R Grande	3	4
(United States) E deLone (Australia) N Pratt	7^{7}	2	5
(Australia) J Dokic (Switzerland) P Schnyder	6^{5}	6	7

Second round
8	(Belgium) L Courtois (Spain) A Sánchez Vicario	6	6
(United States) A Frazier (United States) K Schlukebir	4	1
(Indonesia) Y Basuki (Thailand) T Tanasugarn	4	5
9	(United States) K Po (France) A-G Sidot	6	7
16	(South Africa) L Horn (Argentina) L Montalvo	6	3	6
(Australia) A Ellwood (Australia) L McShea	1	6	1
(Australia) J Dokic (Switzerland) P Schnyder	6	3	6
3	(Russia) A Kournikova (Belarus) N Zvereva	4	6	1

Third round
8	(Belgium) L Courtois (Spain) A Sánchez Vicario	6	6
9	(United States) K Po (France) A-G Sidot	4	0
16	(South Africa) L Horn (Argentina) L Montalvo	6	6
(Australia) J Dokic (Switzerland) P Schnyder	4	4

Quarterfinals
8	(Belgium) L Courtois (Spain) A Sánchez Vicario	5	3
16	(South Africa) L Horn (Argentina) L Montalvo	7	6

==== Section 4 ====
First round
(Czech Republic) E Melicharová (Spain) A Ortuño	2	4
(Italy) S Farina Elia (Slovakia) K Habšudová	6	6
(United States) N Arendt (Netherlands) M Bollegraf	7^{7}	7
WC	(United States) T Snyder (United States) M Tu	6^{4}	5
(United States) D Graham (Japan) N Miyagi	4	2
WC	(Croatia) M Lučić (United States) A Stevenson	6	6
(Croatia) J Kostanić (Slovenia) T Pisnik	7	3	7
WC	(South Africa) M de Swardt (South Africa) J Kruger	5	6	5

Second round
5	(Romania) I Spîrlea (Netherlands) C Vis	2	6	6^{1}
(Italy) S Farina Elia (Slovakia) K Habšudová	6	3	7^{7}
(United States) N Arendt (Netherlands) M Bollegraf	2	7^{7}	6
12	(Slovenia) T Križan (Slovenia) K Srebotnik	6	6^{3}	1
14	(Sweden) Å Carlsson (France) É Loit	7^{7}	4	7
WC	(Croatia) M Lučić (United States) A Stevenson	6^{1}	6	5
(Croatia) J Kostanić (Slovenia) T Pisnik	2	1
2	(Russia) E Likhovtseva (United States) C Morariu	6	6

Third round
(Italy) S Farina Elia (Slovakia) K Habšudová	2	2
(United States) N Arendt (Netherlands) M Bollegraf	6	6
14	(Sweden) Å Carlsson (France) É Loit	4	2
2	(Russia) E Likhovtseva (United States) C Morariu	6	6

Quarterfinals
(United States) N Arendt (Netherlands) M Bollegraf	2	6	6
2	(Russia) E Likhovtseva (United States) C Morariu	6	3	3
