= 1995 Lipton Championships – Women's singles =

Women's singles
- 1995 Lipton Championships
- 1994 Champion: (Germany) Steffi Graf

Final
- Champion: (Germany) Steffi Graf
- Runner-up: (Japan) Kimiko Date
- Score: 6–1, 6–4

Events
Singles	men	women
Doubles	men	women
← 1994 ·	Lipton Championships	· 1996 →

Defending champion Steffi Graf defeated Kimiko Date in the final, 6–1, 6–4 to win the women's singles tennis title at the 1995 Miami Open.

== Seeds ==
A champion seed is indicated in bold text while text in italics indicates the round in which that seed was eliminated. All thirty-three seeds received a bye to the second round.

1. (Spain) Arantxa Sánchez Vicario (third round)
2. (Germany) **Steffi Graf (champion)**
3. (Czech Republic) Jana Novotná (semifinals)
4. (United States) Lindsay Davenport (fourth round)
5. (Argentina) Gabriela Sabatini (semifinals)
6. (Belarus) Natasha Zvereva (quarterfinals)
7. (Japan) Kimiko Date (final)
8. (Germany) Anke Huber (quarterfinals)
9. n/a
10. (Japan) Naoko Sawamatsu (fourth round)
11. (United States) Amy Frazier (second round)
12. (United States) Lori McNeil (second round)
13. (Austria) Judith Wiesner (fourth round)
14. (South Africa) Amanda Coetzer (fourth round)
15. (Argentina) Inés Gorrochategui (fourth round)
16. n/a
17. (United States) Zina Garrison-Jackson (third round)
18. (Slovakia) Karina Habšudová (third round)
19. (Indonesia) Yayuk Basuki (third round)
20. (United States) Lisa Raymond (fourth round)
21. (Romania) Irina Spîrlea (third round)
22. (United States) Gigi Fernández (second round)
23. (France) Nathalie Tauziat (second round)
24. (Belgium) Sabine Appelmans (second round)
25. (United States) Marianne Werdel-Witmeyer (quarterfinals)
26. (Bulgaria) Katerina Maleeva (second round)
27. (Netherlands) Miriam Oremans (third round)
28. (Germany) Barbara Rittner (second round)
29. (Latvia) Larisa Neiland (fourth round)
30. (Mexico) Angélica Gavaldón (third round)
31. (Japan) Kyōko Nagatsuka (second round)
32. (Israel) Anna Smashnova (third round)
33. (Chinese Taipei) Shi-Ting Wang (third round)

== Draw ==
=== Key ===
- Q = Qualifier
- WC = Wild card
- LL = Lucky loser
- Alt = Alternate
- SE = Special exempt
- PR = Protected ranking
- ITF = ITF entry
- JE = Junior exempt
- w/o = Walkover
- r = Retired
- d = Defaulted
- SR = Special ranking

=== Finals ===
Quarterfinals
25	(United States) Marianne Werdel-Witmeyer	1	5
7	(Japan) Kimiko Date	6	7
(Australia) Rachel McQuillan	1	3
5	(Argentina) Gabriela Sabatini	6	6
8	(Germany) Anke Huber	6	4
3	(Czech Republic) Jana Novotná	7	6
6	(Belarus) Natasha Zvereva	4	6
2	(Germany) Steffi Graf	6	7

Semifinals
7	(Japan) Kimiko Date	1	7	7
5	(Argentina) Gabriela Sabatini	6	6	6
3	(Czech Republic) Jana Novotná	2	5
2	(Germany) Steffi Graf	6	7

Final
7	(Japan) Kimiko Date	1	4
2	(Germany) Steffi Graf	6	6

=== Top half ===
==== Section 1 ====
First round
(United States) J Watanabe	4	6	3
Q	(Federal Republic of Yugoslavia) T Ječmenica	6	1	6
LL	(United States) E Hakami	1	4
(Japan) Y Kamio	6	6
LL	(United Kingdom) C Wood	6	4	7
WC	(Netherlands) M Bollegraf	3	6	5
(Ukraine) N Medvedeva	6	6
(Italy) N Baudone	4	2

Second round
1	(Spain) A Sánchez Vicario	6	6
Q	(Federal Republic of Yugoslavia) T Ječmenica	4	0
(Japan) Y Kamio	3	4
25	(United States) M Werdel-Witmeyer	6	6
30	(Mexico) A Gavaldón	6	6
LL	(United Kingdom) C Wood	3	4
(Ukraine) N Medvedeva	6	3
15	(Argentina) I Gorrochategui	7	6

Third round
1	(Spain) A Sánchez Vicario	2	5
25	(United States) M Werdel-Witmeyer	6	7
30	(Mexico) A Gavaldón	6	6	2
15	(Argentina) I Gorrochategui	4	7	6

Fourth round
25	(United States) M Werdel-Witmeyer	6	6
15	(Argentina) I Gorrochategui	1	4

==== Section 2 ====
First round
(Spain) Á Montolio	2	0
(United States) A Keller	6	6
(Japan) A Sugiyama	6	3	2
(Netherlands) K Boogert	2	6	6
(Sweden) Å Carlsson	2	6	7
WC	(United States) S Halsell	6	3	6
WC	(United States) L Poruri	6	6	7
(United States) K Po	3	7	5

Second round
LL	(Thailand) T Tanasugarn	6	2	6
(United States) A Keller	4	6	3
(Netherlands) K Boogert	7	6
23	(France) N Tauziat	5	3
27	(Netherlands) M Oremans	6	6
(Sweden) Å Carlsson	1	1
WC	(United States) L Poruri	2	3
7	(Japan) K Date	6	6

Third round
LL	(Thailand) T Tanasugarn	1	2
(Netherlands) K Boogert	6	6
27	(Netherlands) M Oremans	6	6
7	(Japan) K Date	7	7

Fourth round
(Netherlands) K Boogert	6	1
7	(Japan) K Date	7	6

==== Section 3 ====
First round
(Netherlands) S Rottier	6	6
(Japan) N Miyagi	3	2
(Belgium) E Callens	1	6
(Germany) C Porwik	6	7
(Switzerland) E Zardo	4	4
(Italy) S Farina	6	6
(United States) P Fendick	3	5
(Australia) R McQuillan	6	7

Second round
4	(United States) L Davenport	7	6
(Netherlands) S Rottier	5	3
(Germany) C Porwik	6	3
19	(Indonesia) Y Basuki	7	6
32	(Israel) A Smashnova	6	7
(Italy) S Farina	4	6
(Australia) R McQuillan	6	7
11	(United States) A Frazier	4	5

Third round
4	(United States) L Davenport	6	6
19	(Indonesia) Y Basuki	4	3
32	(Israel) A Smashnova	3	6
(Australia) R McQuillan	6	7

Fourth round
4	(United States) L Davenport	6	2
(Australia) R McQuillan	7	6

==== Section 4 ====
First round
(Romania) R Dragomir	4	6	7
(Italy) A Serra Zanetti	6	2	6
(Australia) K Radford	2	4
(United States) S Cacic	6	6
(Germany) C Singer	6	6
(Austria) P Schwarz	3	3
Q	(Italy) R Grande	6	3	4
(South Africa) E Reinach	2	6	6

Second round
14	(South Africa) A Coetzer	6	6
(Romania) R Dragomir	2	2
(United States) S Cacic	6	5	5
33	(Chinese Taipei) S-T Wang	2	7	7
21	(Romania) I Spîrlea	6	6
(Germany) C Singer	1	4
(South Africa) E Reinach	2	0
5	(Argentina) G Sabatini	6	6

Third round
14	(South Africa) A Coetzer	6	7
33	(Chinese Taipei) S-T Wang	2	5
21	(Romania) I Spîrlea	0	6
5	(Argentina) G Sabatini	6	7

Fourth round
14	(South Africa) A Coetzer	1	1
5	(Argentina) G Sabatini	6	6

=== Bottom half ===
==== Section 5 ====
First round
Q	(Chinese Taipei) J Lee	6	2	7
(South Africa) M de Swardt	4	6	5
(France) S Testud	1	6	6
WC	(United States) L Lee	6	2	4
(Russia) E Likhovtseva	6	0
(United States) N Arendt	7	6
(Sweden) M Strandlund	0	2
(Russia) E Maniokova	6	6

Second round
8	(Germany) A Huber	6	6
Q	(Chinese Taipei) J Lee	1	2
(France) S Testud	7	6
28	(Germany) B Rittner	5	2
20	(United States) L Raymond	7	3	6
(United States) N Arendt	6	6	4
(Russia) E Maniokova	2	4
17	(United States) Z Garrison-Jackson	6	6

Third round
8	(Germany) A Huber	6	6
(France) S Testud	1	1
20	(United States) L Raymond	6	1	6
17	(United States) Z Garrison-Jackson	2	6	1

Fourth round
8	(Germany) A Huber	6	6
20	(United States) L Raymond	4	1

==== Section 6 ====
First round
(Austria) B Schett	6	6
(Australia) N Bradtke	1	3
(Czech Republic) L Richterová	0	6	6
Q	(Belgium) N Feber	6	3	3
(Argentina) P Suárez	0	r
(Belgium) D Monami	2
(Czech Republic) P Langrová	6	3	6
(South Africa) J Kruger	1	6	2

Second round
12	(United States) L McNeil	7	3	6
(Austria) B Schett	6	6	7
(Czech Republic) L Richterová	3	4
29	(Latvia) L Neiland	6	6
24	(Belgium) S Appelmans	3	2
(Belgium) D Monami	6	6
(Czech Republic) P Langrová	2	0
3	(Czech Republic) J Novotná	6	6

Third round
(Austria) B Schett	7	4	5
29	(Latvia) L Neiland	6	6	7
(Belgium) D Monami	6	2
3	(Czech Republic) J Novotná	7	6

Fourth round
29	(Latvia) L Neiland	3	3
3	(Czech Republic) J Novotná	6	6

==== Section 7 ====
First round
Q	(Netherlands) N Muns-Jagerman	6	6
(France) A Dechaume-Balleret	4	2
(United States) D Graham	6	6
(Slovakia) R Zrubáková	1	4
(Bulgaria) E Pampoulova	5	6
(United States) T Whitlinger-Jones	7	7
(Slovakia) K Studeníková	6	6
(Slovenia) T Križan	3	4

Second round
6	(Belarus) N Zvereva	7	7
Q	(Netherlands) N Muns-Jagerman	5	6
(United States) D Graham	6	1
18	(Slovakia) K Habšudová	7	6
26	(Bulgaria) K Maleeva	6	2	2
(United States) T Whitlinger-Jones	4	6	6
(Slovakia) K Studeníková	2	3
10	(Japan) N Sawamatsu	6	6

Third round
6	(Belarus) N Zvereva	7	6
18	(Slovakia) K Habšudová	5	2
(United States) T Whitlinger-Jones	6	2	3
10	(Japan) N Sawamatsu	4	6	6

Fourth round
6	(Belarus) N Zvereva	6	4	6
10	(Japan) N Sawamatsu	1	6	2

==== Section 8 ====
First round
(United States) M McGrath	6	6
Q	(Canada) J Nejedly	2	0
(South Africa) R Nideffer	1	3
Q	(France) I Demongeot	6	6
Q	(Canada) M Drake	6	6
(Belarus) T Ignatieva	3	1
(Czech Republic) R Bobková	1	1
(United States) G Helgeson-Nielsen	6	6

Second round
13	(Austria) J Wiesner	6	6
(United States) M McGrath	2	4
(France) I Demongeot	7	6
31	(Japan) K Nagatsuka	5	1
22	(United States) G Fernández	6	1	r
Q	(Canada) M Drake	7	2
(United States) G Helgeson-Nielsen	2	3
2	(Germany) S Graf	6	6

Third round
13	(Austria) J Wiesner	3	6	6
(France) I Demongeot	6	3	4
Q	(Canada) M Drake	1	2
2	(Germany) S Graf	6	6

Fourth round
13	(Austria) J Wiesner	0	1
2	(Germany) S Graf	6	6
