= 1994 Lipton Championships – Women's doubles =

Women's doubles
- 1994 Lipton Championships
- 1993 Champions: (Latvia) Larisa Neiland (Czech Republic) Jana Novotná

Final
- Champions: (United States) Gigi Fernández (Belarus) Natasha Zvereva
- Runners-up: (United States) Patty Fendick (United States) Meredith McGrath
- Score: 6–3, 6–1

Events
Singles	men	women
Doubles	men	women
← 1993 ·	Lipton Championships	· 1995 →

Larisa Neiland and Jana Novotná were the defending champions but competed with different partners that year, Neiland with Elizabeth Smylie and Novotná with Arantxa Sánchez Vicario.

Neiland and Smylie lost in the quarterfinals to Novotná and Sánchez Vicario.

Novotná and Sánchez Vicario lost in the semifinals to Patty Fendick and Meredith McGrath.

Gigi Fernández and Natasha Zvereva won in the final 6–3, 6–1 against Fendick and McGrath.

== Seeds ==
Champion seeds are indicated in bold text while text in italics indicates the round in which those seeds were eliminated. All sixteen seeded teams received byes into the second round.

1. (United States) **Gigi Fernández** / (Belarus) **Natasha Zvereva (champions)**
2. (Czech Republic) Jana Novotná / (Spain) Arantxa Sánchez Vicario (semifinals)
3. (Netherlands) Manon Bollegraf / (Czech Republic) Helena Suková (quarterfinals)
4. (United States) Patty Fendick / (United States) Meredith McGrath (final)
5. n/a
6. (Latvia) Larisa Neiland / (Australia) Elizabeth Smylie (quarterfinals)
7. (United States) Lori McNeil / (Australia) Rennae Stubbs (semifinals)
8. (South Africa) Amanda Coetzer / (Argentina) Inés Gorrochategui (quarterfinals)
9. (United States) Katrina Adams / (United States) Kathy Rinaldi-Stunkel (quarterfinals)
10. (United States) Lindsay Davenport / (United States) Lisa Raymond (third round)
11. (Italy) Sandra Cecchini / (Argentina) Patricia Tarabini (third round)
12. (Canada) Jill Hetherington / (United States) Shaun Stafford (third round)
13. (Italy) Laura Golarsa / (Ukraine) Natalia Medvedeva (second round)
14. (Bulgaria) Katerina Maleeva / (Georgia (country)) Leila Meskhi (second round)
15. (Indonesia) Yayuk Basuki / (Japan) Nana Miyagi (third round)
16. (France) Julie Halard / (France) Nathalie Tauziat (third round)

== Draw ==
=== Key ===
- Q = Qualifier
- WC = Wild card
- LL = Lucky loser
- Alt = Alternate
- SE = Special exempt
- PR = Protected ranking
- ITF = ITF entry
- JE = Junior exempt
- w/o = Walkover
- r = Retired
- d = Defaulted
- SR = Special ranking

=== Finals ===
Semifinals

Final

1
- (United States) Gigi Fernández
- (Belarus) Natasha Zvereva
2
6
6

7
- (United States) Lori McNeil
- (Australia) Rennae Stubbs
6
2
4

1
- (United States) Gigi Fernández
- (Belarus) Natasha Zvereva
6
6

4
- (United States) Patty Fendick
- (United States) Meredith McGrath
3
1

4
- (United States) Patty Fendick
- (United States) Meredith McGrath
7
7

2
- (Czech Republic) Jana Novotná
- (Spain) Arantxa Sánchez Vicario
5
5

=== Top half ===
==== Section 1 ====
First round

Second round

Third round

Quarterfinals

1
- (United States) G Fernández
- (Belarus) N Zvereva
6
6

Q
- (United States) S Gilchrist
- (United States) V Paynter
6
4
6

Q
- (United States) S Gilchrist
- (United States) V Paynter
1
2

- (United Kingdom) V Lake
- (United Kingdom) C Wood
3
6
1

1
- (United States) G Fernández
- (Belarus) N Zvereva
6
6

- (Germany) W Probst
- (Germany) C Singer
6
3

11
- (Italy) S Cecchini
- (Argentina) P Tarabini
2
1

- (Argentina) B Fulco-Villella
- (Finland) P Thorén
7
6

- (Argentina) B Fulco-Villella
- (Finland) P Thorén
4
7
4

11
- (Italy) S Cecchini
- (Argentina) P Tarabini
6
5
6

1
- (United States) G Fernández
- (Belarus) N Zvereva
6
7

9
- (United States) K Adams
- (United States) K Rinaldi-Stunkel
4
5

9
- (United States) K Adams
- (United States) K Rinaldi-Stunkel
6
4
6

- (United States) A deLone
- (United States) E deLone
6
5

- (France) I Demongeot
- (Germany) K Kschwendt
4
6
2

- (France) I Demongeot
- (Germany) K Kschwendt
7
7

9
- (United States) K Adams
- (United States) K Rinaldi-Stunkel
6
7

- (United States) L Harvey-Wild
- (United States) C Rubin
6
6

LL
- (Brazil) L Tella
- (Brazil) A Vieira
4
6

LL
- (Spain) E Jiménez
- (Paraguay) L Schaerer
2
3

- (United States) L Harvey-Wild
- (United States) C Rubin
4
6
3

LL
- (Brazil) L Tella
- (Brazil) A Vieira
6
3
6

==== Section 2 ====
First round

Second round

Third round

Quarterfinals

3
- (Netherlands) M Bollegraf
- (Czech Republic) H Suková
6
6

- (Poland) M Mroz
- (Poland) K Teodorowicz
6
6

- (Poland) M Mroz
- (Poland) K Teodorowicz
1
0

- (Romania) R Dragomir
- (Romania) I Spîrlea
3
4

3
- (Netherlands) M Bollegraf
- (Czech Republic) H Suková
3
6
6

- (United States) S Collins
- (South Africa) M de Swardt
6
7
2

16
- (France) J Halard
- (United States) N Tauziat
6
3
3

- (United States) N Arendt
- (Australia) K Radford
7
6
6

- (United States) N Arendt
- (Australia) K Radford
3
3

16
- (France) J Halard
- (France) N Tauziat
6
6

3
- (Netherlands) M Bollegraf
- (Czech Republic) H Suková
2
1

7
- (United States) L McNeil
- (Australia) R Stubbs
6
6

13
- (Italy) L Golarsa
- (Ukraine) N Medvedeva
7
4
4

- (Slovakia) K Studeníková
- (Slovakia) D Szabova
4
2

- (Croatia) M Murić
- (United States) S Reece
5
6
6

- (Croatia) M Murić
- (United States) S Reece
6
6

- (Croatia) M Murić
- (United States) S Reece
4
1

- (South Africa) E Reinach
- (Czech Republic) A Strnadová
7
6

7
- (United States) L McNeil
- (Australia) R Stubbs
6
6

- (Slovakia) J Husárová
- (Slovakia) R Zrubáková
5
2

- (South Africa) E Reinach
- (Czech Republic) A Strnadová
4
1

7
- (United States) L McNeil
- (Australia) R Stubbs
6
6

=== Bottom half ===
==== Section 3 ====
First round

Second round

Third round

Quarterfinals

8
- (South Africa) A Coetzer
- (Argentina) I Gorrochategui
6
6

- (Netherlands) K Boogert
- (Netherlands) N Muns-Jagerman
2
3

- (United States) B Bowes-Hackney
- (United States) M Werdel
2
2

- (United States) B Bowes-Hackney
- (United States) M Werdel
6
6

8
- (South Africa) A Coetzer
- (Argentina) I Gorrochategui
6
6

- (United States) C Benjamin
- (United States) M Jackson-Nobrega
0
6
4

15
- (Indonesia) Y Basuki
- (Japan) N Miyagi
4
1

- (Canada) C Delisle
- (United States) C MacGregor
6
4
6

- (Canada) C Delisle
- (United States) C MacGregor
6
2
3

15
- (Indonesia) Y Basuki
- (Japan) N Miyagi
4
6
6

8
- (South Africa) A Coetzer
- (Argentina) I Gorrochategui
5
2

4
- (United States) P Fendick
- (United States) M McGrath
7
6

10
- (United States) L Davenport
- (United States) L Raymond
6
6

- (United States) A Keller
- (United States) S McCarthy
6
6

- (Russia) E Likhovtseva
- (Russia) E Makarova
3
1

- (Russia) E Likhovtseva
- (Russia) E Makarova
7
7

10
- (United States) L Davenport
- (United States) L Raymond
2
3

- (Netherlands) M Oremans
- (Netherlands) C Vis
6
5
7

4
- (United States) P Fendick
- (United States) M McGrath
6
6

- (Germany) M Babel
- (Belgium) D Monami
2
7
6

- (Netherlands) M Oremans
- (Netherlands) C Vis
5
6
2

4
- (United States) P Fendick
- (United States) M McGrath
7
2
6

==== Section 4 ====
First round

Second round

Third round

Quarterfinals

6
- (Latvia) L Neiland
- (Australia) E Smylie
3
6
6

- (Sweden) Å Carlsson
- (Germany) C Schneider
3
3

- (Italy) S Farina
- (United States) G Helgeson
6
1
4

- (Italy) S Farina
- (United States) G Helgeson
6
6

6
- (Latvia) L Neiland
- (Australia) E Smylie
6
5
6

- (United States) A Frazier
- (Japan) R Hiraki
5
2

WC
- (Argentina) G Sabatini
- (United States) J Steven
1
7
4

WC
- (Argentina) G Sabatini
- (United States) J Steven
7
6

WC
- (Argentina) G Sabatini
- (United States) J Steven
7
6

14
- (Bulgaria) K Maleeva
- (Georgia (country)) L Meskhi
5
0

6
- (Latvia) L Neiland
- (Australia) E Smylie
5
1

2
- (Czech Republic) J Novotná
- (Spain) A Sánchez Vicario
7
6

12
- (Canada) J Hetherington
- (United States) S Stafford
6
6

- (Romania) C Cristea
- (United States) P O'Reilly
1
0

- (United States) E Hakami
- (Mexico) L Novelo
3
4

- (United States) E Hakami
- (Mexico) L Novelo
6
6

12
- (Canada) J Hetherington
- (United States) S Stafford
4
5

- (Australia) M Jaggard-Lai
- (Canada) R Simpson-Alter
7
4
6

2
- (Czech Republic) J Novotná
- (Spain) A Sánchez Vicario
6
7

- (United Kingdom) J Durie
- (Argentina) F Labat
6
6
2

- (Australia) M Jaggard-Lai
- (Canada) R Simpson-Alter
5
3

2
- (Czech Republic) J Novotná
- (Spain) A Sánchez Vicario
7
6
