= 1996 Lipton Championships – Women's singles =

Women's singles
- 1996 Lipton Championships

Final
- Champion: (Germany) Steffi Graf
- Runner-up: (United States) Chanda Rubin
- Score: 6–1, 6–3

Details
- Draw: 96
- Seeds: 32

Events
Singles	men	women
Doubles	men	women
← 1995 ·	Miami Open	· 1997 →

Two-time defending champion Steffi Graf defeated Chanda Rubin in the final, 6–1, 6–3 to win the women's singles tennis title at the 1996 Miami Open.

== Seeds ==
A champion seed is indicated in bold text while text in italics indicates the round in which that seed was eliminated. All thirty-two seeds received a bye to the second round.

1. (Germany) **Steffi Graf (champion)**
2. (Spain) Arantxa Sánchez Vicario (second round)
3. (Germany) Anke Huber (quarterfinals)
4. (Argentina) Gabriela Sabatini (quarterfinals)
5. (Japan) Kimiko Date (quarterfinals)
6. (United States) Chanda Rubin (final)
7. (Czech Republic) Jana Novotná (third round)
8. (United States) Lindsay Davenport (semifinals)
9. (United States) Mary Joe Fernández (fourth round)
10. (South Africa) Amanda Coetzer (third round)
11. (Switzerland) Martina Hingis (second round)
12. (France) Julie Halard-Decugis (fourth round)
13. (United States) Zina Garrison-Jackson (second round)
14. (France) Nathalie Tauziat (fourth round)
15. (Czech Republic) Helena Suková (third round)
16. (Romania) Irina Spîrlea (quarterfinals)
17. (Austria) Barbara Paulus (third round)
18. (Austria) Judith Wiesner (fourth round)
19. (United States) Lisa Raymond (third round)
20. (Japan) Naoko Sawamatsu (second round)
21. (United States) Marianne Werdel-Witmeyer (third round)
22. (Sweden) Åsa Carlsson (second round)
23. (Japan) Ai Sugiyama (fourth round)
24. (Netherlands) Kristie Boogert (third round)
25. (Germany) Petra Begerow (second round)
26. (Argentina) Florencia Labat (third round)
27. (Japan) Yone Kamio (second round)
28. (Italy) Silvia Farina (fourth round)
29. (Russia) Elena Likhovtseva (second round)
30. (Netherlands) Miriam Oremans (third round)
31. (France) Sandrine Testud (third round)
32. (Chinese Taipei) Shi-Ting Wang (third round)

== Draw ==
=== Key ===
- Q = Qualifier
- WC = Wild card
- LL = Lucky loser
- Alt = Alternate
- SE = Special exempt
- PR = Protected ranking
- ITF = ITF entry
- JE = Junior exempt
- w/o = Walkover
- r = Retired
- d = Defaulted
- SR = Special ranking

=== Finals ===
Quarterfinals
1	(Germany) Steffi Graf	7^{7}	6
5	(Japan) Kimiko Date	6^{4}	3
3	(Germany) Anke Huber	0	1
8	(United States) Lindsay Davenport	6	6
6	(United States) Chanda Rubin	6	5	6
4	(Argentina) Gabriela Sabatini	3	7	3
16	(Romania) Irina Spîrlea	4	5
(Slovakia) Karina Habšudová	6	7

Semifinals
1	(Germany) Steffi Graf	6	6
8	(United States) Lindsay Davenport	4	4
6	(United States) Chanda Rubin	4	6	6
(Slovakia) Karina Habšudová	6	4	2

Final
1	(Germany) Steffi Graf	6	6
6	(United States) Chanda Rubin	1	3

=== Top half ===
==== Section 1 ====
First round
(Federal Republic of Yugoslavia) T Ječmenica	4	2
(United States) S Cacic	6	6
Q	(Hungary) V Csurgo	2	3
(United States) G Fernández	6	6
Q	(Argentina) P Suárez	0	2
(Belgium) D Van Roost	6	6
Q	(Italy) S Cecchini	3	6	3
(Indonesia) Y Basuki	6	4	6

Second round
1	(Germany) S Graf	6	7
(United States) S Cacic	1	5
(United States) G Fernández	6^{6}	6	6
20	(Japan) N Sawamatsu	7^{8}	3	3
26	(Argentina) F Labat	4	6	6
(Belgium) D Van Roost	6	2	3
(Indonesia) Y Basuki	2	1
9	(United States) M J Fernández	6	6

Third round
1	(Germany) S Graf	6	6
(United States) G Fernández	3	2
26	(Argentina) F Labat	2	6	4
9	(United States) M J Fernández	6	4	6

Fourth round
1	(Germany) S Graf	6	6
9	(United States) M J Fernández	1	0

==== Section 2 ====
First round
Q	(France) A Dechaume-Balleret	6	6
(United States) L McNeil	3	3
(Austria) B Reinstadler	4	4
(Japan) M Endo	6	6
(Italy) R Grande	6	4	3
(Germany) S Hack	4	6	6
(Austria) B Schett	7	6
(Poland) K Nowak	5	0

Second round
15	(Czech Republic) H Suková	1	6	6
Q	(France) A Dechaume-Balleret	6	4	2
(Japan) M Endo	0	4
28	(Italy) S Farina	6	6
21	(United States) M Werdel-Witmeyer	6	2	6
(Germany) S Hack	4	6	1
(Austria) B Schett	3	5
5	(Japan) K Date	6	7

Third round
15	(Czech Republic) H Suková	0	5
28	(Italy) S Farina	6	7
21	(United States) M Werdel-Witmeyer	0	0
5	(Japan) K Date	6	6

Fourth round
28	(Italy) S Farina	2	2
5	(Japan) K Date	6	6

==== Section 3 ====
First round
(Japan) N Kijimuta	3	3
LL	(United States) J Watanabe	6	6
Q	(United States) E deLone	7	3	7
(Spain) V Ruano-Pascual	5	6	5
(Latvia) L Neiland	6	6
WC	(Bulgaria) K Maleeva	4	4
LL	(Japan) N Miyagi	5	6	6
(Romania) R Dragomir	7	3	2

Second round
3	(Germany) A Huber	6	6^{8}	6
LL	(United States) J Watanabe	3	7^{10}	1
Q	(United States) E deLone	2	3
32	(Chinese Taipei) S-T Wang	6	6
18	(Austria) J Wiesner	1	6	6
(Latvia) L Neiland	6	2	4
LL	(Japan) N Miyagi	5	6	6
11	(Switzerland) M Hingis	7	1	3

Third round
3	(Germany) A Huber	6	5	6
32	(Chinese Taipei) S-T Wang	0	7	4
18	(Austria) J Wiesner	6	6
LL	(Japan) N Miyagi	2	2

Fourth round
3	(Germany) A Huber	6	6
18	(Austria) J Wiesner	4	4

==== Section 4 ====
First round
(Australia) R Stubbs	1	0
(United States) A Grossman	6	6
(United States) L Wild	6	6
LL	(Italy) F Lubiani	2	1
Q	(Germany) C Porwik	6	6
(United States) G Helgeson-Nielsen	4	0
(Germany) B Rittner	6^{3}	6	2
Q	(Italy) L Golarsa	7^{7}	4	6

Second round
13	(United States) Z Garrison-Jackson	4	5
(United States) A Grossman	6	7
(United States) L Wild	2	6	3
30	(Netherlands) M Oremans	6	2	6
24	(Netherlands) K Boogert	6	1	6
Q	(Germany) C Porwik	4	6	2
Q	(Italy) L Golarsa	1	2
8	(United States) L Davenport	6	6

Third round
(United States) A Grossman	6	0	6
30	(Netherlands) M Oremans	4	6	2
24	(Netherlands) K Boogert	4	5
8	(United States) L Davenport	6	7

Fourth round
(United States) A Grossman	0	2
8	(United States) L Davenport	6	6

=== Bottom half ===
==== Section 5 ====
First round
(France) A Fusai	6	6
LL	(Argentina) M J Gaidano	3	1
(United States) M McGrath	6	7
(United States) T Whitlinger-Jones	1	5
(Belgium) N Feber	4	2
WC	(United States) K Adams	6	6
(United States) L Lee	6	6
(China) J-Q Yi	3	0

Second round
6	(United States) C Rubin	6	6
(France) A Fusai	2	0
(United States) M McGrath	6	6^{7}	6
22	(Sweden) Å Carlsson	2	7^{9}	3
25	(Germany) P Begerow	3	4
WC	(United States) K Adams	6	6
(United States) L Lee	4	5
14	(France) N Tauziat	6	7

Third round
6	(United States) C Rubin	6	6
(United States) M McGrath	2	3
WC	(United States) K Adams	0	2
14	(France) N Tauziat	6	6

Fourth round
6	(United States) C Rubin	6	6
14	(France) N Tauziat	3	4

==== Section 6 ====
First round
(Germany) V Martinek	7	2	3
WC	(United States) D Graham	5	6	6
(France) L Ghirardi	5	1
(United States) J Capriati	7	6
(Germany) J Kandarr	4	6	6^{8}
(Germany) K Kschwendt	6	4	7^{10}
(Israel) A Smashnova	6	6
(Japan) K Nagatsuka	3	4

Second round
10	(South Africa) A Coetzer	6	6
WC	(United States) D Graham	4	3
(United States) J Capriati	7^{7}	6
29	(Russia) E Likhovtseva	6^{5}	4
27	(Japan) Y Kamio	1	6	2
(Germany) K Kschwendt	6	3	6
(Israel) A Smashnova	3	0
4	(Argentina) G Sabatini	6	6

Third round
10	(South Africa) A Coetzer	4	6	1
(United States) J Capriati	6	0	6
(Germany) K Kschwendt	3	2
4	(Argentina) G Sabatini	6	6

Fourth round
(United States) J Capriati	1	4
4	(Argentina) G Sabatini	6	6

==== Section 7 ====
First round
WC	(United States) K Rinaldi-Stunkel	3	6	4
(United States) S Stafford	6	1	6
(Czech Republic) L Richterová	3	4
(Mexico) A Gavaldón	6	6
(Slovakia) K Studeníková	6	6
Q	(Canada) M Drake	4	2
(United States) N Arendt	3	2
(Germany) C Singer	6	6

Second round
7	(Czech Republic) J Novotná	7	6
(United States) S Stafford	5	3
(Mexico) A Gavaldón	1	1
23	(Japan) A Sugiyama	6	6
19	(United States) L Raymond	6	6
(Slovakia) K Studeníková	2	3
(Germany) C Singer	3	2
16	(Romania) I Spîrlea	6	6

Third round
7	(Czech Republic) J Novotná	3	3
23	(Japan) A Sugiyama	6	6
19	(United States) L Raymond	4	4
16	(Romania) I Spîrlea	6	6

Fourth round
23	(Japan) A Sugiyama	4	5
16	(Romania) I Spîrlea	6	7

==== Section 8 ====
First round
(United States) C Morariu	6	1
WC	(United States) P Shriver	0	0	r
WC	(United States) T Snyder	6^{4}	3
(Australia) R McQuillan	7^{7}	6
(Canada) P Hy-Boulais	6^{3}	3
(Italy) A Serra Zanetti	7^{7}	6
(Slovakia) K Habšudová	6	4	6
(Germany) S Meier	4	6	1

Second round
12	(France) J Halard-Decugis	6	6
(United States) C Morariu	4	0
(Australia) R McQuillan	5	3
17	(Austria) B Paulus	7	6
31	(France) S Testud	6	6
(Italy) A Serra Zanetti	1	1
(Slovakia) K Habšudová	2	6	7^{7}
2	(Spain) A Sánchez Vicario	6	3	6^{4}

Third round
12	(France) J Halard-Decugis	3	7^{9}	6
17	(Austria) B Paulus	6	6^{7}	4
31	(France) S Testud	4	2
(Slovakia) K Habšudová	6	6

Fourth round
12	(France) J Halard-Decugis	6	4	4
(Slovakia) K Habšudová	1	6	6
