= 1994 Lipton Championships – Women's singles =

Women's singles
- 1994 Lipton Championships
- 1993 Champion: (Spain) Arantxa Sánchez Vicario

Final
- Champion: (Germany) Steffi Graf
- Runner-up: (Belarus) Natasha Zvereva
- Score: 4–6, 6–1, 6–2

Events
Singles	men	women
Doubles	men	women
← 1993 ·	Lipton Championships	· 1995 →

Steffi Graf defeated Natasha Zvereva in the final, 4–6, 6–1, 6–2 to win the women's singles tennis title at the 1994 Miami Open.

Arantxa Sánchez Vicario was the two-time defending champion, but lost in the quarterfinals to Brenda Schultz.

== Seeds ==
A champion seed is indicated in bold text while text in italics indicates the round in which that seed was eliminated. All thirty-two seeds received a bye to the second round.

1. (Germany) **Steffi Graf (champion)**
2. (Spain) Arantxa Sánchez Vicario (quarterfinals)
3. (Argentina) Gabriela Sabatini (quarterfinals)
4. (Czech Republic) Jana Novotná (quarterfinals)
5. (Japan) Kimiko Date (quarterfinals)
6. n/a
7. (United States) Lindsay Davenport (semifinals)
8. (South Africa) Amanda Coetzer (fourth round)
9. (Belarus) Natasha Zvereva (final)
10. (United States) Zina Garrison-Jackson (fourth round)
11. (Czech Republic) Helena Suková (second round)
12. (France) Nathalie Tauziat (fourth round)
13. (Austria) Judith Wiesner (third round)
14. (United States) Lori McNeil (fourth round)
15. (Ukraine) Natalia Medvedeva (second round)
16. (Bulgaria) Katerina Maleeva (third round)
17. (United States) Patty Fendick (third round)
18. (Japan) Naoko Sawamatsu (fourth round)
19. (Georgia (country)) Leila Meskhi (fourth round)
20. (United States) Amy Frazier (fourth round)
21. (Indonesia) Yayuk Basuki (second round)
22. (France) Julie Halard (second round)
23. (Netherlands) Brenda Schultz (semifinals)
24. (United States) Chanda Rubin (third round)
25. (United States) Ginger Helgeson (third round)
26. (Germany) Meike Babel (third round)
27. (Netherlands) Miriam Oremans (second round)
28. (Canada) Patricia Hy (third round)
29. (Argentina) Florencia Labat (fourth round)
30. (Netherlands) Stephanie Rottier (second round)
31. (United States) Meredith McGrath (third round)
32. (United States) Marianne Werdel (third round)

== Draw ==
=== Key ===
- Q = Qualifier
- WC = Wild card
- LL = Lucky loser
- Alt = Alternate
- SE = Special exempt
- PR = Protected ranking
- ITF = ITF entry
- JE = Junior exempt
- w/o = Walkover
- r = Retired
- d = Defaulted
- SR = Special ranking

=== Finals ===
Quarterfinals
1	(Germany) Steffi Graf	6	6
5	(Japan) Kimiko Date	1	1
3	(Argentina) Gabriela Sabatini	2	1
7	(United States) Lindsay Davenport	6	6
9	(Belarus) Natasha Zvereva	7	7
4	(Czech Republic) Jana Novotná	6	6
23	(Netherlands) Brenda Schultz	1	7	6
2	(Spain) Arantxa Sánchez Vicario	6	6	3

Semifinals
1	(Germany) Steffi Graf	6	7
7	(United States) Lindsay Davenport	0	6
9	(Belarus) Natasha Zvereva	6	6
23	(Netherlands) Brenda Schultz	0	4

Final
1	(Germany) Steffi Graf	4	6	6
9	(Belarus) Natasha Zvereva	6	1	2

=== Top half ===
==== Section 1 ====
First round
(United States) B Bowes-Hackney	6	2	6
LL	(Netherlands) C Vis	2	6	2
(Belgium) D Monami	6	6	7
(United States) G Fernández	7	3	6
(Romania) I Spîrlea	1	7	2
(Italy) S Farina	6	6	6
(United States) D Graham	5	r
WC	(Austria) B Paulus	4

Second round
1	(Germany) S Graf	6	6
(United States) B Bowes-Hackney	1	0
(Belgium) D Monami	3	2
25	(United States) G Helgeson	6	6
20	(United States) A Frazier	7	2	6
(Italy) S Farina	5	6	3
WC	(Austria) B Paulus	2	6
16	(Bulgaria) K Maleeva	6	7

Third round
1	(Germany) S Graf	6	6
25	(United States) G Helgeson	2	1
20	(United States) A Frazier	6	7
16	(Bulgaria) K Maleeva	2	6

Fourth round
1	(Germany) S Graf	6	6
20	(United States) A Frazier	3	0

==== Section 2 ====
First round
(Latvia) L Neiland	2	6	6
(Belarus) T Ignatieva	6	3	1
Q	(Canada) M Drake	5	6
(Slovakia) K Studeníková	7	7
(Italy) L Golarsa	7	4	4
(France) K Quentrec	6	6	6
(Germany) K Kschwendt	6	6
(United States) K Rinaldi-Stunkel	3	4

Second round
13	(Austria) J Wiesner	7	6
(Latvia) L Neiland	5	0
(Slovakia) K Studeníková	6	4
18	(Japan) N Sawamatsu	7	6
28	(Canada) P Hy	4	7	6
(France) K Quentrec	6	6	3
(Germany) K Kschwendt	2	2
5	(Japan) K Date	6	6

Third round
13	(Austria) J Wiesner	4	6	0
18	(Japan) N Sawamatsu	6	4	6
28	(Canada) P Hy	2	r
5	(Japan) K Date	2

Fourth round
18	(Japan) N Sawamatsu	2	4
5	(Japan) K Date	6	6

==== Section 3 ====
First round
(Belgium) S Wasserman	4	7	0
(South Africa) E Reinach	6	6	6
Q	(Brazil) A Vieira	6	7
(Germany) M Kochta	4	5
Q	(United States) A Mall	1	6	7
WC	(United States) A Keller	6	3	5
(Romania) R Dragomir	6	1
LL	(Netherlands) P Kamstra	7	6

Second round
3	(Argentina) G Sabatini	6	6
(South Africa) E Reinach	2	2
Q	(Brazil) A Vieira	3	6
24	(United States) C Rubin	6	7
32	(United States) M Werdel	6	6
Q	(United States) A Mall	2	4
LL	(Netherlands) P Kamstra	0	6	2
10	(United States) Z Garrison-Jackson	6	4	6

Third round
3	(Argentina) G Sabatini	6	6
24	(United States) C Rubin	3	2
32	(United States) M Werdel	3	3
10	(United States) Z Garrison-Jackson	6	6

Fourth round
3	(Argentina) G Sabatini	6	6
10	(United States) Z Garrison-Jackson	4	2

==== Section 4 ====
First round
WC	(United States) J Watanabe	7	6
(Russia) E Makarova	6	0
(United States) T Whitlinger	6	6
(United States) L Raymond	4	1
(United States) C Kuhlman	0	3
Q	(United States) M Jackson-Nobrega	6	6
(Austria) B Reinstadler	4	7	1
(United States) L Harvey-Wild	6	6	6

Second round
12	(France) N Tauziat	7	5	7
WC	(United States) J Watanabe	5	7	5
(United States) T Whitlinger	6	6
21	(Indonesia) Y Basuki	2	3
30	(Netherlands) S Rottier	3	2
Q	(United States) M Jackson-Nobrega	6	6
(United States) L Harvey-Wild	3	1
7	(United States) L Davenport	6	6

Third round
12	(France) N Tauziat	6	2	6
(United States) T Whitlinger	3	6	4
Q	(United States) M Jackson-Nobrega	3	6	1
7	(United States) L Davenport	6	1	6

Fourth round
12	(France) N Tauziat	0	5
7	(United States) L Davenport	6	7

=== Bottom half ===
==== Section 5 ====
First round
(Slovakia) J Husárová	3	3
(Indonesia) R Tedjakusuma	6	6
Q	(Italy) F Romano	5	6	7
(France) S Testud	7	3	5
(Argentina) I Gorrochategui	4	7	6
Q	(Italy) R Grande	6	5	1
Q	(United States) E deLone	3	6	4
WC	(South Africa) J Kruger	6	2	6

Second round
8	(South Africa) A Coetzer	6	6
(Indonesia) R Tedjakusuma	1	1
Q	(Italy) F Romano	3	2
26	(Germany) M Babel	6	6
22	(France) J Halard	0	1
(Argentina) I Gorrochategui	6	6
WC	(South Africa) J Kruger	0	1
9	(Belarus) N Zvereva	6	6

Third round
8	(South Africa) A Coetzer	6	7
26	(Germany) M Babel	2	6
(Argentina) I Gorrochategui	2	3
9	(Belarus) N Zvereva	6	6

Fourth round
8	(South Africa) A Coetzer	6	4
9	(Belarus) N Zvereva	7	6

==== Section 6 ====
First round
WC	(Slovakia) R Zrubáková	6	4	6
LL	(Netherlands) C Wegink	1	6	2
(Australia) K Radford	2	0
(Russia) E Likhovtseva	6	6
(Canada) R Simpson-Alter	6	6	6
(Italy) M Grossi	1	7	4
(Germany) C Singer	5	7	5
WC	(Chinese Taipei) J Lee	7	5	7

Second round
11	(Czech Republic) H Suková	3	4
WC	(Slovakia) R Zrubáková	6	6
(Russia) E Likhovtseva	6	3	2
29	(Argentina) F Labat	4	6	6
31	(United States) M McGrath	6	2
(Canada) R Simpson-Alter	1	0	r
WC	(Chinese Taipei) J Lee	2	2
4	(Czech Republic) J Novotná	6	6

Third round
WC	(Slovakia) R Zrubáková	4	4
29	(Argentina) F Labat	6	6
31	(United States) M McGrath	2	1
4	(Czech Republic) J Novotná	6	6

Fourth round
29	(Argentina) F Labat	4	2
4	(Czech Republic) J Novotná	6	6

==== Section 7 ====
First round
(Australia) M Jaggard-Lai	4	3
(Netherlands) K Boogert	6	6
(United Kingdom) C Wood	6	6
WC	(Greece) C Papadáki	2	3
Q	(Netherlands) M Bollegraf	1	6
WC	(Romania) C Cristea	6	7
(Germany) W Probst	6	6
(Netherlands) N Muns-Jagerman	3	4

Second round
LL	(Venezuela) M Vento	4	6
(Netherlands) K Boogert	6	7
(United Kingdom) C Wood	2	6	4
19	(Georgia (country)) L Meskhi	6	2	6
23	(Netherlands) B Schultz	6	7
WC	(Romania) C Cristea	2	6
(Germany) W Probst	6	6
15	(Ukraine) N Medvedeva	1	4

Third round
(Netherlands) K Boogert	6	2	0
19	(Georgia (country)) L Meskhi	0	6	6
23	(Netherlands) B Schultz	6	4	6
(Germany) W Probst	2	6	1

Fourth round
19	(Georgia (country)) L Meskhi	4	2
23	(Netherlands) B Schultz	6	6

==== Section 8 ====
First round
(Japan) R Hiraki	6	3	2
(United States) S Stafford	3	6	6
(United States) N Arendt	7	6
(Argentina) P Tarabini	5	1
(France) N van Lottum	2	6	7
LL	(Japan) A Sugiyama	6	4	5
(Canada) H Kelesi	6	6
(Argentina) M-J Gaidano	0	2

Second round
14	(United States) L McNeil	7	6
(United States) S Stafford	6	4
(United States) N Arendt	7	6
27	(Netherlands) M Oremans	6	2
17	(United States) P Fendick	6	6
(France) N van Lottum	3	3
(Canada) H Kelesi	2	0
2	(Spain) A Sánchez Vicario	6	6

Third round
14	(United States) L McNeil	6	6
(United States) N Arendt	4	3
17	(United States) P Fendick	1	3
2	(Spain) A Sánchez Vicario	6	6

Fourth round
14	(United States) L McNeil	2	1
2	(Spain) A Sánchez Vicario	6	6
