= 1996 Lipton Championships – Men's doubles =

Men's doubles
- 1996 Lipton Championships

Final
- Champions: (Australia) Todd Woodbridge (Australia) Mark Woodforde
- Runners-up: (South Africa) Ellis Ferreira (United States) Patrick Galbraith
- Score: 6–1, 6–3

Details
- Draw: 48
- Seeds: 16

Events
| Singles | men | women |
| Doubles | men | women |
- Lipton Championships

Todd Woodbridge and Mark Woodforde were the defending champions and won in the final 6–1, 6–3 against Ellis Ferreira and Patrick Galbraith.

== Seeds ==
All sixteen seeded teams received byes into the second round.

1. (Australia) Todd Woodbridge / (Australia) Mark Woodforde (champions)
2. n/a
3. (The Bahamas) Mark Knowles / (Canada) Daniel Nestor (semifinals)
4. (Zimbabwe) Byron Black / (Canada) Grant Connell (semifinals)
5. (United States) Rick Leach / (United States) Scott Melville (third round)
6. (Canada) Sébastien Lareau / (United States) Alex O'Brien (quarterfinals)
7. (France) Guy Forget / (Switzerland) Jakob Hlasek (second round)
8. (Netherlands) Menno Oosting / (Czech Republic) Cyril Suk (third round)
9. (United States) Patrick McEnroe / (Australia) Sandon Stolle (quarterfinals)
10. (South Africa) Ellis Ferreira / (United States) Patrick Galbraith (final)
11. (United States) Todd Martin / (United States) Jonathan Stark (second round)
12. (Sweden) Jonas Björkman / (Sweden) Stefan Edberg (third round)
13. (Argentina) Luis Lobo / (Spain) Javier Sánchez (third round)
14. (United States) Trevor Kronemann / (Australia) David Macpherson (third round, withdrew)
15. (United States) Brian MacPhie / (Australia) Mark Philippoussis (second round)
16. (United States) Jim Grabb / (United States) Richey Reneberg (quarterfinals)

== Draw ==
Key

- Q = Qualifier
- WC = Wild card
- LL = Lucky loser
- Alt = Alternate
- ITF = ITF entry
- PR = Protected ranking
- SR = Special ranking
- SE = Special exempt
- JE = Junior exempt
- JR = Junior Accelerator Programme entrant
- CO = College Accelerator Programme entrant
- NG = Next Gen Accelerator Program entrant
- w/o = Walkover
- r = Retired
- d = Defaulted

=== Finals ===
Semifinals

Final

1
- (Australia) Todd Woodbridge
- (Australia) Mark Woodforde
6
6

3
- (The Bahamas) Mark Knowles
- (Canada) Daniel Nestor
3
4

1
- (Australia) Todd Woodbridge
- (Australia) Mark Woodforde
6
6

10
- (South Africa) Ellis Ferreira
- (United States) Patrick Galbraith
1
3

4
- (Zimbabwe) Byron Black
- (Canada) Grant Connell
2
2

10
- (South Africa) Ellis Ferreira
- (United States) Patrick Galbraith
6
6

=== Top half ===
==== Section 1 ====
First round

Second round

Third round

Quarterfinals

1
- (Australia) T Woodbridge
- (Australia) M Woodforde
6
6

- (Czech Republic) K Nováček
- (South Africa) M Ondruska
6
6

- (Czech Republic) K Nováček
- (South Africa) M Ondruska
3
4

- (South Africa) L Bale
- (South Africa) B Haygarth
2
3

1
- (Australia) T Woodbridge
- (Australia) M Woodforde
7
6

- (United States) L Jensen
- (United States) M Jensen
6
6
6

- (Czech Republic) M Damm
- (Czech Republic) P Korda
5
4

- (Czech Republic) M Damm
- (Czech Republic) P Korda
1
7
7

- (Czech Republic) M Damm
- (Czech Republic) P Korda
6
7

15
- (United States) B MacPhie
- (Australia) M Philippoussis
3
5

1
- (Australia) T Woodbridge
- (Australia) M Woodforde
7
6

9
- (United States) P McEnroe
- (Australia) S Stolle
6
4

9
- (United States) P McEnroe
- (Australia) S Stolle
6
6

Q
- (Australia) S Draper
- (Australia) J Stoltenberg
6
4
3

- (United States) M Keil
- (Sweden) M Larsson
4
4

- (United States) M Keil
- (Sweden) M Larsson
4
6
6

9
- (United States) P McEnroe
- (Australia) S Stolle
6
3
6

- (United States) D Johnson
- (United States) F Montana
6
6

8
- (Netherlands) M Oosting
- (Czech Republic) C Suk
3
6
3

- (Italy) A Gaudenzi
- (Italy) D Nargiso
3
4

- (United States) D Johnson
- (United States) F Montana
6
7
5

8
- (Netherlands) M Oosting
- (Czech Republic) C Suk
7
5
7

==== Section 2 ====
First round

Second round

Third round

Quarterfinals

3
- (The Bahamas) M Knowles
- (Canada) D Nestor
6
6
6

WC
- (Australia) P Cash
- (United States) J Gimelstob
2
7
6

WC
- (Australia) P Cash
- (United States) J Gimelstob
7
3
4

- (Canada) G Michibata
- (The Bahamas) R Smith
6
6
2

3
- (The Bahamas) M Knowles
- (Canada) D Nestor
6
6

- (South Africa) J-L de Jager
- (South Africa) G Muller
3
6
3

13
- (Argentina) L Lobo
- (Spain) J Sánchez
3
4

WC
- (Australia) P Kilderry
- (Australia) P Tramacchi
6
2
6

WC
- (Australia) P Kilderry
- (Australia) P Tramacchi
2
4

13
- (Argentina) L Lobo
- (Spain) J Sánchez
6
6

3
- (The Bahamas) M Knowles
- (Canada) D Nestor
6
7

- (Australia) J Eagle
- (Australia) A Florent
4
6

11
- (United States) T Martin
- (United States) J Stark
6
5

WC
- (United States) J Courier
- (Sweden) T Enqvist
7
6
6

- (Australia) J Eagle
- (Australia) A Florent
7
7

- (Australia) J Eagle
- (Australia) A Florent
5
7
7

- (Australia) J Eagle
- (Australia) A Florent
6
3
6

- (United Kingdom) T Henman
- (Germany) P Kühnen
5
2

5
- (United States) R Leach
- (United States) S Melville
4
6
3

- (India) L Paes
- (Venezuela) N Pereira
7
6

- (India) L Paes
- (Venezuela) N Pereira
5
5

5
- (United States) R Leach
- (United States) S Melville
7
7

=== Bottom half ===
==== Section 3 ====
First round

Second round

Third round

Quarterfinals

6
- (Canada) S Lareau
- (United States) A O'Brien
6
6

- (United States) B Behrens
- (Australia) M Tebbutt
4
6
7

- (United States) B Behrens
- (Australia) M Tebbutt
3
0

- (Argentina) P Albano
- (Czech Republic) V Flégl
6
4
5

6
- (Canada) S Lareau
- (United States) A O'Brien
6
2
6

- (United States) M Lucena
- (Australia) J Morgan
4
3

12
- (Sweden) J Björkman
- (Sweden) S Edberg
2
6
4

- (United States) K Flach
- (United States) K Jones
6
6

- (United States) K Flach
- (United States) K Jones
7
3
4

12
- (Sweden) J Björkman
- (Sweden) S Edberg
5
6
6

6
- (Canada) S Lareau
- (United States) A O'Brien
7
4
2

4
- (Zimbabwe) B Black
- (Canada) G Connell
6
6
6

14
- (United States) T Kronemann
- (Australia) D Macpherson
6
6

- (United States) K Kinnear
- (United States) D Randall
6
1
6

- (United States) K Kinnear
- (United States) D Randall
3
4

- (Netherlands) T Nijssen
- (United States) G Van Emburgh
4
6
3

14
- (United States) T Kronemann
- (Australia) D Macpherson

- (Hungary) G Köves
- (United Kingdom) A Richardson
4
4

4
- (Zimbabwe) B Black
- (Canada) G Connell
w/o

- (United States) K Thorne
- (United States) J Waite
6
6

- (United States) K Thorne
- (United States) J Waite

4
- (Zimbabwe) B Black
- (Canada) G Connell
w/o

==== Section 4 ====
First round

Second round

Third round

Quarterfinals

7
- (France) G Forget
- (Switzerland) J Hlasek
6
3
4

- (France) J-P Fleurian
- (France) G Raoux
7
6

- (France) J-P Fleurian
- (France) G Raoux
2
6
6

- (Sweden) D Ekerot
- (Netherlands) S Noteboom
6
4

- (France) J-P Fleurian
- (France) G Raoux
5
4

- (United States) S Davis
- (United States) D Pate
4
6
3

10
- (South Africa) E Ferreira
- (United States) P Galbraith
7
6

WC
- (Spain) À Corretja
- (Netherlands) S Schalken
6
3
6

WC
- (Spain) À Corretja
- (Netherlands) S Schalken
6
1
4

10
- (South Africa) E Ferreira
- (United States) P Galbraith
4
6
6

10
- (South Africa) E Ferreira
- (United States) P Galbraith
3
6
6

16
- (United States) J Grabb
- (United States) R Reneberg
6
3
2

16
- (United States) J Grabb
- (United States) R Reneberg
6
6
7

Q
- (France) A Boetsch
- (Switzerland) M Rosset
6
2

- (Argentina) J Frana
- (Spain) E Sánchez
3
7
6

- (Argentina) J Frana
- (Spain) E Sánchez
7
6

16
- (United States) J Grabb
- (United States) R Reneberg
2
6
6

- (Netherlands) R Krajicek
- (Netherlands) J Siemerink
6
6

- (Netherlands) R Krajicek
- (Netherlands) J Siemerink
6
1
0

- (Sweden) R Bergh
- (United States) S Cannon
2
2

- (Netherlands) R Krajicek
- (Netherlands) J Siemerink
6
6

LL
- (Mexico) Ó Ortiz
- (Sweden) L-A Wahlgren
3
4
