= 2003 NASDAQ-100 Open – Men's doubles =

Men's doubles
- 2003 NASDAQ-100 Open

Final
- Champions: (Switzerland) Roger Federer (Belarus) Max Mirnyi
- Runners-up: (India) Leander Paes (Czech Republic) David Rikl
- Score: 7–5, 6–3

Events
Singles	men	women
Doubles	men	women
← 2002 ·	NASDAQ-100 Open	· 2004 →

Mark Knowles and Daniel Nestor were the defending champions but lost in the quarterfinals to Roger Federer and Max Mirnyi.

Federer and Mirnyi won in the final 7–5, 6–3 against Leander Paes and David Rikl.

== Seeds ==
1. (The Bahamas) Mark Knowles / (Canada) Daniel Nestor (quarterfinals)
2. (Sweden) Jonas Björkman / (Australia) Todd Woodbridge (quarterfinals)
3. (United States) Bob Bryan / (United States) Mike Bryan (semifinals)
4. (Czech Republic) Martin Damm / (Czech Republic) Cyril Suk (quarterfinals)
5. (Zimbabwe) Wayne Black / (Zimbabwe) Kevin Ullyett (second round)
6. (India) Leander Paes / (Czech Republic) David Rikl (final)
7. (Switzerland) Roger Federer / (Belarus) Max Mirnyi (champions)
8. (Czech Republic) Tomáš Cibulec / (Czech Republic) Pavel Vízner (quarterfinals)

== Draw ==
=== Key ===
- Q = Qualifier
- WC = Wild card
- LL = Lucky loser
- Alt = Alternate
- SE = Special exempt
- PR = Protected ranking
- ITF = ITF entry
- JE = Junior exempt
- w/o = Walkover
- r = Retired
- d = Defaulted
- SR = Special ranking

=== Final ===
Semifinals
7	(Switzerland) Roger Federer (Belarus) Max Mirnyi	6	6
(Chile) Fernando González (Spain) Tommy Robredo	3	4
3	(United States) Bob Bryan (United States) Mike Bryan	6	6^{2}	4
6	(India) Leander Paes (Czech Republic) David Rikl	3	7^{7}	6

Final
7	(Switzerland) Roger Federer (Belarus) Max Mirnyi	7	6
6	(India) Leander Paes (Czech Republic) David Rikl	5	3

=== Top half ===
First round
1	(The Bahamas) M Knowles (Canada) D Nestor	6	6
(Australia) P Hanley (Australia) N Healey	4	4
WC	(Australia) L Hewitt (Australia) M Philippoussis	6^{4}	3
(United States) R Ginepri (United States) A Roddick	7^{7}	6
(Germany) M Kohlmann (Germany) R Schüttler	6^{5}	7^{7}	7^{7}
(South Africa) D Adams (Netherlands) S Schalken	7^{7}	6^{5}	6^{5}
(India) M Bhupathi (United Kingdom) T Henman	6	3	4
7	(Switzerland) R Federer (Belarus) M Mirnyi	4	6	6
4	(Czech Republic) M Damm (Czech Republic) C Suk	6	3	6
WC	(United States) M Fish (United States) J Morrison	4	6	4
(France) N Escudé (Russia) M Safin	6^{7}	5
(Argentina) G Etlis (Argentina) M Rodríguez	7^{9}	7
(Chile) F González (Spain) T Robredo	6	6
(United States) S Humphries (Russia) Y Kafelnikov	1	4
(Spain) À Corretja (Spain) A Costa	2	5
5	(Zimbabwe) W Black (Zimbabwe) K Ullyett	6	7

Second round
1	(The Bahamas) M Knowles (Canada) D Nestor	6	6
(United States) R Ginepri (United States) A Roddick	4	1
(Germany) M Kohlmann (Germany) R Schüttler	2	3
7	(Switzerland) R Federer (Belarus) M Mirnyi	6	6
4	(Czech Republic) M Damm (Czech Republic) C Suk	5	6	7
(Argentina) G Etlis (Argentina) M Rodríguez	7	4	5
(Chile) F González (Spain) T Robredo	6	6^{0}	7^{7}
5	(Zimbabwe) W Black (Zimbabwe) K Ullyett	4	7^{7}	6^{3}

Quarterfinals
1	(The Bahamas) M Knowles (Canada) D Nestor	3	4
7	(Switzerland) R Federer (Belarus) M Mirnyi	6	6
4	(Czech Republic) M Damm (Czech Republic) C Suk	3	5
(Chile) F González (Spain) T Robredo	6	7

Semifinals
7	(Switzerland) R Federer (Belarus) M Mirnyi	6	6
(Chile) F González (Spain) T Robredo	3	4

=== Bottom half ===
First round
8	(Czech Republic) T Cibulec (Czech Republic) P Vízner	7^{12}	2	6
(Morocco) Y El Aynaoui (Argentina) G Gaudio	6^{10}	6	4
(United States) J-M Gambill (United States) G Oliver	4	6	6
(South Africa) C Haggard (South Africa) R Koenig	6	1	4
(Czech Republic) F Čermák (Czech Republic) L Friedl	5	6^{5}
(Australia) J Eagle (United States) B MacPhie	7	7^{7}
(Argentina) M Hood (Czech Republic) P Luxa	3	2
3	(United States) B Bryan (United States) M Bryan	6	6
6	(India) L Paes (Czech Republic) D Rikl	3	6	7^{7}
(Czech Republic) P Pála (Germany) D Prinosil	6	2	6^{5}
(France) M Llodra (Serbia and Montenegro) N Zimonjić	6^{5}	3
(United States) D Johnson (United States) R Leach	7^{7}	6
(United States) J Blake (The Bahamas) M Merklein	6	7
(Argentina) L Arnold (Argentina) D Nalbandian	4	5
(Czech Republic) J Novák (Czech Republic) D Škoch	4	1
2	(Sweden) J Björkman (Australia) T Woodbridge	6	6

Second round
8	(Czech Republic) T Cibulec (Czech Republic) P Vízner	5	6	6
(United States) J-M Gambill (United States) G Oliver	7	2	4
(Australia) J Eagle (United States) B MacPhie	3	4
3	(United States) B Bryan (United States) M Bryan	6	6
6	(India) L Paes (Czech Republic) D Rikl	6	7^{7}
(United States) D Johnson (United States) J Palmer	4	6^{2}
(United States) J Blake (The Bahamas) M Merklein	1	4
2	(Sweden) J Björkman (Australia) T Woodbridge	6	6

Quarterfinals
8	(Czech Republic) T Cibulec (Czech Republic) P Vízner	6^{10}	7^{7}	4
3	(United States) B Bryan (United States) M Bryan	7^{12}	6^{5}	6
6	(India) L Paes (Czech Republic) D Rikl	3	7^{7}	6
2	(Sweden) J Björkman (Australia) T Woodbridge	6	6^{2}	4

Semifinals
3	(United States) B Bryan (United States) M Bryan	6	6^{2}	4
6	(India) L Paes (Czech Republic) D Rikl	3	7^{7}	6
