= 1996 Lipton Championships – Women's doubles =

Women's doubles
- 1996 Lipton Championships
- 1995 Champions: (Czech Republic) Jana Novotná (Spain) Arantxa Sánchez Vicario

Final
- Champions: (Czech Republic) Jana Novotná (Spain) Arantxa Sánchez Vicario
- Runners-up: (United States) Meredith McGrath (Latvia) Larisa Neiland
- Score: 6–4, 6–4

Details
- Draw: 48
- Seeds: 16

Events
Singles	men	women
Doubles	men	women
← 1995 ·	Miami Open	· 1997 →

Jana Novotná and Arantxa Sánchez Vicario were the defending champions and won in the final 6–4, 6–4 against Meredith McGrath and Larisa Neiland.

== Seeds ==
Champion seeds are indicated in bold text while text in italics indicates the round in which those seeds were eliminated. All sixteen seeded teams received byes into the second round.

1. (Czech Republic) **Jana Novotná** / (Spain) **Arantxa Sánchez Vicario (champions)**
2. n/a
3. (United States) Meredith McGrath / (Latvia) Larisa Neiland (final)
4. (United States) Lindsay Davenport / (United States) Mary Joe Fernández (semifinals)
5. (United States) Nicole Arendt / (Netherlands) Manon Bollegraf (quarterfinals)
6. (United States) Lori McNeil / (Czech Republic) Helena Suková (quarterfinals)
7. (United States) Chanda Rubin / (Netherlands) Brenda Schultz-McCarthy (quarterfinals)
8. (United States) Lisa Raymond / (Argentina) Gabriela Sabatini (second round)
9. (Spain) Conchita Martínez / (Argentina) Patricia Tarabini (third round)
10. (France) Julie Halard-Decugis / (France) Nathalie Tauziat (quarterfinals)
11. (United States) Katrina Adams / (South Africa) Mariaan de Swardt (third round)
12. (Canada) Jill Hetherington / (Romania) Irina Spîrlea (second round)
13. (Indonesia) Yayuk Basuki / (Netherlands) Caroline Vis (third round)
14. (Netherlands) Kristie Boogert / (Netherlands) Miriam Oremans (third round)
15. (United States) Zina Garrison-Jackson / (United States) Kathy Rinaldi-Stunkel (third round)
16. (France) Alexia Dechaume-Balleret / (France) Sandrine Testud (second round)

== Draw ==
=== Key ===
- Q = Qualifier
- WC = Wild card
- LL = Lucky loser
- Alt = Alternate
- ITF = ITF entry
- PR = Protected ranking
- SR = Special ranking
- SE = Special exempt
- JE = Junior exempt
- JR = Junior Accelerator Programme entrant
- CO = College Accelerator Programme entrant
- NG = Next Gen Accelerator Program entrant
- w/o = Walkover
- r = Retired
- d = Defaulted

=== Finals ===
Semifinals
1	(Czech Republic) Jana Novotná (Spain) Arantxa Sánchez Vicario	6	6
4	(United States) Lindsay Davenport (United States) Mary Joe Fernández	4	2
3	(United States) Meredith McGrath (Latvia) Larisa Neiland	6	6
(South Africa) Rosalyn Nideffer (United States) Kimberly Po	1	1

Final
1	(Czech Republic) Jana Novotná (Spain) Arantxa Sánchez Vicario	6	6
3	(United States) Meredith McGrath (Latvia) Larisa Neiland	4	4

=== Top half ===
==== Section 1 ====
First round
(Germany) K Kschwendt (Canada) R Simpson	3	4
(Japan) K Nagatsuka (Japan) A Sugiyama	6	6
(Australia) A Ellwood (United States) G Helgeson-Nielsen	4	7^{7}	6
(Belgium) N Feber (Argentina) M Paz	6	6^{3}	4
(Slovakia) D Krajčovičová (Czech Republic) L Němečková	2	5
(Federal Republic of Yugoslavia) T Ječmenica (Germany) C Porwik	6	7
(United States) E deLone (United States) D Scott	1	1
(Germany) W Probst (Germany) C Singer	6	6

Second round
1	(Czech Republic) J Novotná (Spain) A Sánchez Vicario	2	6	7
(Japan) K Nagatsuka (Japan) A Sugiyama	6	3	5
(Australia) A Ellwood (United States) G Helgeson-Nielsen	4	6^{5}
15	(United States) Z Garrison-Jackson (United States) K Rinaldi-Stunkel	6	7^{7}
11	(United States) K Adams (South Africa) M de Swardt	7^{7}	6
(Federal Republic of Yugoslavia) T Ječmenica (Germany) C Porwik	6^{3}	4
(Germany) W Probst (Germany) C Singer	6^{7}	2
6	(United States) L McNeil (Czech Republic) H Suková	7^{9}	6

Third round
1	(Czech Republic) J Novotná (Spain) A Sánchez Vicario	7	6
15	(United States) Z Garrison-Jackson (United States) K Rinaldi-Stunkel	5	4
11	(United States) K Adams (South Africa) M de Swardt	6^{3}	2
6	(United States) L McNeil (Czech Republic) H Suková	7^{7}	6

Quarterfinals
1	(Czech Republic) J Novotná (Spain) A Sánchez Vicario	7	7
6	(United States) L McNeil (Czech Republic) H Suková	5	5

==== Section 2 ====
First round
(Romania) R Dragomir (United States) A Grossman	6^{5}	4
(United States) A Lettiere (United States) C Morariu	7^{7}	6
WC	(United States) P Shriver (Australia) E Smylie	3	6	3
(Italy) S Cecchini (Italy) L Garrone	6	1	6
(United States) M Werdel-Witmeyer (United States) T Whitlinger-Jones	6	0	3
(Slovakia) J Husárová (Russia) E Likhovtseva	0	6	6
(Sweden) Å Carlsson (Hungary) A Temesvári	5	4
(Argentina) L Montalvo (Argentina) P Suárez	7	6

Second round
4	(United States) L Davenport (United States) M J Fernández	6	6
(United States) A Lettiere (United States) C Morariu	2	2
(Italy) S Cecchini (Italy) L Garrone	3	1
9	(Spain) C Martínez (Argentina) P Tarabini	6	6
13	(Indonesia) Y Basuki (Netherlands) C Vis	6	6
(Slovakia) J Husárová (Russia) E Likhovtseva	4	2
(Argentina) L Montalvo (Argentina) P Suárez	1	1
7	(United States) C Rubin (Netherlands) B Schultz-McCarthy	6	6

Third round
4	(United States) L Davenport (United States) M J Fernández	6	6
9	(Spain) C Martínez (Argentina) P Tarabini	2	0
13	(Indonesia) Y Basuki (Netherlands) C Vis	2	4
7	(United States) C Rubin (Netherlands) B Schultz-McCarthy	6	6

Quarterfinals
4	(United States) L Davenport (United States) M J Fernández	3	6	6
7	(United States) C Rubin (Netherlands) B Schultz-McCarthy	6	4	2

=== Bottom half ===
==== Section 3 ====
First round
(Australia) R McQuillan (United States) S Stafford	6	6
LL	(United States) E Hakami (Australia) N Pratt	4	4
(Czech Republic) P Langrová (Slovakia) R Zrubáková	1	5
(Japan) N Miyagi (United States) S Reece	6	7
(Slovenia) T Križan (Belgium) D Van Roost	4	4
(United States) D Graham (United States) L Wild	6	6
(Slovakia) K Studeníková (United Kingdom) C Wood	4	5
(Italy) S Farina (Italy) L Golarsa	6	7

Second round
8	(United States) L Raymond (Argentina) G Sabatini	6	6
(Australia) R McQuillan (United States) S Stafford	1	2
LL	(Japan) N Miyagi (United States) S Reece	4	3
10	(France) J Halard-Decugis (France) N Tauziat	6	6
16	(France) A Dechaume-Balleret (France) S Testud	4	6	4
(United States) D Graham (United States) L Wild	6	4	6
(Italy) S Farina (Italy) L Golarsa	2	4
3	(United States) M McGrath (Latvia) L Neiland	6	6

Third round
8	(United States) L Raymond (Argentina) G Sabatini	4	4
10	(France) J Halard-Decugis (France) N Tauziat	6	6
(United States) D Graham (United States) L Wild	2	4
3	(United States) M McGrath (Latvia) L Neiland	6	6

Quarterfinals
10	(France) J Halard-Decugis (France) N Tauziat	4	6	5
3	(United States) M McGrath (Latvia) L Neiland	6	3	7

==== Section 4 ====
First round
(France) A Fusai (Ukraine) N Medvedeva	6	6
(Greece) C Papadáki (Australia) L Pleming	1	3
(Japan) R Hiraki (Canada) P Hy-Boulais	5	7	6
(Romania) C Cristea (Germany) C Schneider	7	5	1
(Italy) R Grande (United States) J Steven	5	2
(Switzerland) M Hingis (Germany) A Huber	7	6
Q	(United States) L Lee (Croatia) M Murić	2	1
(South Africa) R Nideffer (United States) K Po	6	6

Second round
5	(United States) N Arendt (Netherlands) M Bollegraf	6	2	6
(France) A Fusai (Ukraine) N Medvedeva	3	6	2
(Japan) R Hiraki (Canada) P Hy-Boulais	2	3
14	(Netherlands) K Boogert (Netherlands) M Oremans	6	6
12	(Canada) J Hetherington (Romania) I Spîrlea	5	1
(Switzerland) M Hingis (Germany) A Huber	7	6
(South Africa) R Nideffer (United States) K Po	6	6
LL	(Canada) M Bernard (Canada) C Delisle	4	1

Third round
5	(United States) N Arendt (Netherlands) M Bollegraf	6	6
14	(Netherlands) K Boogert (Netherlands) M Oremans	2	3
(Switzerland) M Hingis (Germany) A Huber	4	6	3
(South Africa) R Nideffer (United States) K Po	6	0	6

Quarterfinals
5	(United States) N Arendt (Netherlands) M Bollegraf	6	2	2
(South Africa) R Nideffer (United States) K Po	3	6	6
