= 2001 Ericsson Open – Women's doubles =

Women's doubles
- 2001 Ericsson Open

Final
- Champions: (Spain) Arantxa Sánchez Vicario (France) Nathalie Tauziat
- Runners-up: (United States) Lisa Raymond (Australia) Rennae Stubbs
- Score: 6–0, 6–4

Details
- Draw: 32 (2WC/1Q)
- Seeds: 8

Events
Singles	men	women
Doubles	men	women
← 2000 ·	Miami Open	· 2002 →

Julie Halard-Decugis and Ai Sugiyama were the defending champions but only Sugiyama competed that year with Nicole Arendt.

Arendt and Sugiyama lost in the first round to Kristie Boogert and Miriam Oremans.

Arantxa Sánchez Vicario and Nathalie Tauziat won in the final 6–0, 6–4 against Lisa Raymond and Rennae Stubbs.

== Seeds ==
Champion seeds are indicated in bold text while text in italics indicates the round in which those seeds were eliminated.

1. (United States) Nicole Arendt / (Japan) Ai Sugiyama (first round)
2. (United States) Lisa Raymond / (Australia) Rennae Stubbs (final)
3. (Spain) **Arantxa Sánchez Vicario** / (France) **Nathalie Tauziat (champions)**
4. (Zimbabwe) Cara Black / (Russia) Elena Likhovtseva (quarterfinals)
5. (Germany) Anke Huber / (Austria) Barbara Schett (quarterfinals)
6. (Belgium) Els Callens / (United States) Meghann Shaughnessy (quarterfinals)
7. (United States) Kimberly Po / (Australia) Nicole Pratt (quarterfinals)
8. (Italy) Tathiana Garbin / (Slovakia) Janette Husárová (second round)

== Draw ==
=== Key ===
- Q = Qualifier
- WC = Wild card
- LL = Lucky loser
- Alt = Alternate
- SE = Special exempt
- PR = Protected ranking
- ITF = ITF entry
- JE = Junior exempt
- w/o = Walkover
- r = Retired
- d = Defaulted
- SR = Special ranking

=== Final ===
Final
3	(Spain) **Arantxa Sánchez Vicario** (France) **Nathalie Tauziat**	**6**	**6**
2	(United States) Lisa Raymond (Australia) Rennae Stubbs	0	4

=== Top half ===
First round
1	(United States) N Arendt (Japan) A Sugiyama	5	3
(Netherlands) **K Boogert** (Netherlands) **M Oremans**	**7**	**6**
Q	(South Africa) **N de Villiers** (Australia) **A Ellwood**	**6**	**6**
(Romania) R Dragomir (Kazakhstan) I Selyutina	3	3
(Uzbekistan) I Tulyaganova (Netherlands) C Vis	3	6^{4}
(Sweden) **Å Carlsson** (Bulgaria) **M Maleeva**	**6**	**7^{7}**
(United States) E deLone (Japan) N Miyagi	5	4
7	(United States) **K Po** (Australia) **N Pratt**	**7**	**6**
3	(Spain) **A Sánchez Vicario** (France) **N Tauziat**	**6**	**6**
(Slovenia) T Pisnik (Spain) V Ruano Pascual	1	2
(France) **É Loit** (France) **A-G Sidot**	**6**	**6**
(United States) A Frazier (United States) K Schlukebir	1	2
(Australia) R McQuillan (Australia) L McShea	6^{1}	**6**	4
(Chinese Taipei) **J Lee** (Indonesia) **W Prakusya**	**7^{7}**	1	**6**
WC	(United States) J Capriati (Russia) E Dementieva	4	**7^{7}**	0
6	(Belgium) **E Callens** (United States) **M Shaughnessy**	**6**	6^{5}	**6**

Second round
(Netherlands) **K Boogert** (Netherlands) **M Oremans**	3	**6**	**6**
Q	(South Africa) N de Villiers (Australia) A Ellwood	**6**	3	4
(Sweden) Å Carlsson (Bulgaria) M Maleeva	2	1
7	(United States) **K Po** (Australia) **N Pratt**	**6**	**6**
3	(Spain) **A Sánchez Vicario** (France) **N Tauziat**	**6**	**6**
(France) É Loit (France) A-G Sidot	3	1
(Chinese Taipei) J Lee (Indonesia) W Prakusya	**6**	3	1
6	(Belgium) **E Callens** (United States) **M Shaughnessy**	1	**6**	**6**

Quarterfinals
(Netherlands) **K Boogert** (Netherlands) **M Oremans**	**6**	3	**7**
7	(United States) K Po (Australia) N Pratt	3	**6**	5
3	(Spain) **A Sánchez Vicario** (France) **N Tauziat**	6^{4}	**6**	**6**
6	(Belgium) E Callens (United States) M Shaughnessy	**7^{7}**	1	2

Semifinals
(Netherlands) K Boogert (Netherlands) M Oremans	**7^{7}**	3	4
3	(Spain) **A Sánchez Vicario** (France) **N Tauziat**	6^{5}	**6**	**6**

=== Bottom half ===
First round
8	(Italy) **T Garbin** (Slovakia) **J Husárová**	**6**	**6**
(Switzerland) P Schnyder (Spain) M Serna	4	4
(South Africa) **L Huber** (Argentina) **L Montalvo**	**6**	**6**
(Austria) S Plischke (Germany) E Wagner	1	3
(Federal Republic of Yugoslavia) J Dokić (Federal Republic of Yugoslavia) S Načuk	4	2
(Italy) **R Grande** (Croatia) **I Majoli**	**6**	**6**
(Slovakia) K Habšudová (Canada) S Jeyaseelan	2	3
4	(Zimbabwe) **C Black** (Russia) **E Likhovtseva**	**6**	**6**
5	(Germany) **A Huber** (Austria) **B Schett**	**7**	**6**
WC	(United States) L Osterloh (United States) A Stevenson	5	1
(Slovenia) T Križan (Slovenia) K Srebotnik	4	4
(South Africa) **M de Swardt** (South Africa) **J Steck**	**6**	**6**
(Belgium) K Clijsters (Belgium) L Courtois	3	1
(France) **N Dechy** (France) **S Testud**	**6**	**6**
(South Africa) A Coetzer (United States) L McNeil	5	1
2	(United States) **L Raymond** (Australia) **R Stubbs**	**7**	**6**

Second round
8	(Italy) T Garbin (Slovakia) J Husárová	**7**	5	r
(South Africa) **L Huber** (Argentina) **L Montalvo**	5	**7**
(Italy) R Grande (Croatia) I Majoli	6^{5}	1
4	(Zimbabwe) **C Black** (Russia) **E Likhovtseva**	**7^{7}**	**6**
5	(Germany) **A Huber** (Austria) **B Schett**	**6**	**6**
(South Africa) M de Swardt (South Africa) J Steck	4	2
(France) N Dechy (France) S Testud	2	3
2	(United States) **L Raymond** (Australia) **R Stubbs**	**6**	**6**

Quarterfinals
(South Africa) **L Huber** (Argentina) **L Montalvo**	**6**	2	**6**
4	(Zimbabwe) C Black (Russia) E Likhovtseva	2	**6**	3
5	(Germany) A Huber (Austria) B Schett	1	4
2	(United States) **L Raymond** (Australia) **R Stubbs**	**6**	**6**

Semifinals
(South Africa) L Huber (Argentina) L Montalvo	1	0
2	(United States) **L Raymond** (Australia) **R Stubbs**	**6**	**6**

== Qualifying ==
=== Seeds ===
1. (Russia) Alina Jidkova / (Belarus) Tatiana Poutchek (first round)
2. **(South Africa) Nannie de Villiers / (Australia) Annabel Ellwood (qualified)**

=== Qualifiers ===
1. **(South Africa) Nannie de Villiers / (Australia) Annabel Ellwood**

=== Qualifying draw ===
First round
1	(Russia) A Jidkova (Belarus) T Poutchek	7
**(Japan) S Asagoe** **(Japan) Y Yoshida**	**9**
WC	**(United States) A Harkleroad** **(United States) B Mattek**	**8**
(Germany) A Glass (Australia) A Molik	6
2	**(South Africa) N de Villiers** **(Australia) A Ellwood**	**8**
(Russia) L Krasnoroutskaya (Germany) B Lamade	6
(Czech Republic) K Hrdličková (Germany) B Rittner	6
**(Slovenia) P Rampre** **(France) V Razzano**	**8**

Second round
(Japan) S Asagoe (Japan) Y Yoshida	8^{6}
WC	**(United States) A Harkleroad** **(United States) B Mattek**	**9^{8}**
2	**(South Africa) N de Villiers** **(Australia) A Ellwood**	**8**
(Slovenia) P Rampre (France) V Razzano	1

Qualifying competition
WC	(United States) A Harkleroad (United States) B Mattek	4	4
2	**(South Africa) N de Villiers** **(Australia) A Ellwood**	**6**	**6**
