= 1995 Lipton Championships – Women's doubles =

Women's doubles
- 1995 Lipton Championships
- 1994 Champions: (United States) Gigi Fernández; (Belarus) Natasha Zvereva

Final
- Champions: (Czech Republic) Jana Novotná; (Spain) Arantxa Sánchez Vicario
- Runners-up: (United States) Gigi Fernández; (Belarus) Natasha Zvereva
- Score: 7–5, 2–6, 6–3

Events
Singles	men	women
Doubles	men	women
← 1994 ·	Lipton Championships	· 1996 →

Gigi Fernández and Natasha Zvereva were the defending champions but lost in the final 7–5, 2–6, 6–3 against Jana Novotná and Arantxa Sánchez Vicario.

== Seeds ==
Champion seeds are indicated in bold text while text in italics indicates the round in which those seeds were eliminated. All seventeen seeded teams received byes into the second round.

1. (United States) Gigi Fernández / (Belarus) Natasha Zvereva (final)
2. (Czech Republic) **Jana Novotná** / (Spain) **Arantxa Sánchez Vicario (champions)**
3. (United States) Lindsay Davenport / (United States) Lisa Raymond (third round)
4. (United States) Meredith McGrath / (Latvia) Larisa Neiland (semifinals)
5. (United States) Lori McNeil / (France) Nathalie Tauziat (quarterfinals)
6. (Netherlands) Manon Bollegraf / (Australia) Rennae Stubbs (quarterfinals)
7. n/a
8. (South Africa) Amanda Coetzer / (Argentina) Inés Gorrochategui (third round)
9. (Italy) Laura Golarsa / (Russia) Eugenia Maniokova (third round)
10. (United States) Katrina Adams / (United States) Zina Garrison-Jackson (third round)
11. (Indonesia) Yayuk Basuki / (Japan) Nana Miyagi (third round)
12. (Australia) Nicole Bradtke / (Australia) Kristine Radford (third round)
13. (South Africa) Elna Reinach / (Romania) Irina Spîrlea (third round)
14. (United States) Debbie Graham / (Canada) Jill Hetherington (third round)
15. (Japan) Kyōko Nagatsuka / (Japan) Ai Sugiyama (quarterfinals)
16. (Bulgaria) Katerina Maleeva / (Ukraine) Natalia Medvedeva (quarterfinals)
17. (Italy) Sandra Cecchini / (Netherlands) Caroline Vis (second round)

== Draw ==
=== Key ===
- Q = Qualifier
- WC = Wild card
- LL = Lucky loser
- Alt = Alternate
- SE = Special exempt
- PR = Protected ranking
- ITF = ITF entry
- JE = Junior exempt
- w/o = Walkover
- r = Retired
- d = Defaulted
- SR = Special ranking

=== Finals ===
Semifinals

Final

1
- (United States) Gigi Fernández
- (Belarus) Natasha Zvereva
6
6

- (Belgium) Sabine Appelmans
- (Netherlands) Miriam Oremans
1
2

1
- (United States) Gigi Fernández
- (Belarus) Natasha Zvereva
5
6
3

2
- (Czech Republic) Jana Novotná
- (Spain) Arantxa Sánchez Vicario
7
2
6

4
- (United States) Meredith McGrath
- (Latvia) Larisa Neiland
6
2
4

2
- (Czech Republic) Jana Novotná
- (Spain) Arantxa Sánchez Vicario
1
6
6

=== Top half ===
==== Section 1 ====
First round

Second round

Third round

Quarterfinals

1
- (United States) G Fernández
- (Belarus) N Zvereva
6
4
6

- (Czech Republic) R Bobková
- (Slovakia) K Studeníková
6
6

- (Czech Republic) R Bobková
- (Slovakia) K Studeníková
2
6
1

- (South Africa) M de Swardt
- (Canada) P Hy-Boulais
3
3

1
- (United States) G Fernández
- (Belarus) N Zvereva
6
6

- (United States) B Bowes-Hackney
- (South Africa) R Nideffer
5
5

14
- (United States) D Graham
- (Canada) J Hetherington
2
2

- (United States) A Frazier
- (United States) K Po
7
7

- (United States) A Frazier
- (United States) K Po
6
3
2

14
- (United States) D Graham
- (Canada) J Hetherington
4
6
6

1
- (United States) G Fernández
- (Belarus) N Zvereva
4
6
6

5
- (United States) L McNeil
- (France) N Tauziat
6
2
2

11
- (Indonesia) Y Basuki
- (Japan) N Miyagi
6
6

- (Slovakia) P Marková
- (Ukraine) E Tatarkova
3
4

- (South Africa) L Horn
- (Belgium) D Monami
4
3

- (South Africa) L Horn
- (Belgium) D Monami
6
6

11
- (Indonesia) Y Basuki
- (Japan) N Miyagi
3
6
4

- (Ukraine) O Lugina
- (Bulgaria) E Pampoulova
4
4

5
- (United States) L McNeil
- (France) N Tauziat
6
4
6

- (Italy) S Farina
- (Belgium) N Feber
6
6

- (Italy) S Farina
- (Belgium) N Feber
3
2

5
- (United States) L McNeil
- (France) N Tauziat
6
6

==== Section 2 ====
First round

Second round

Third round

Quarterfinals

3
- (United States) L Davenport
- (United States) L Raymond
6
4
6

- (Japan) Y Kamio
- (Slovenia) T Križan
4
1

- (Germany) K Kschwendt
- (United Kingdom) C Wood
3
6
2

- (Germany) K Kschwendt
- (United Kingdom) C Wood
6
6

3
- (United States) L Davenport
- (United States) L Raymond

- (Canada) M Bernard
- (Canada) C Delisle
6
6

15
- (Japan) K Nagatsuka
- (Japan) A Sugiyama
w/o

- (United States) M Werdel-Witmeyer
- (United States) T Whitlinger-Jones
4
4

- (Canada) M Bernard
- (Canada) C Delisle
5
1

15
- (Japan) K Nagatsuka
- (Japan) A Sugiyama
7
6

15
- (Japan) K Nagatsuka
- (Japan) A Sugiyama
3
3

- (Belgium) S Appelmans
- (Netherlands) M Oremans
6
6

17
- (Italy) S Cecchini
- (Netherlands) C Vis
4
4

- (Belgium) S Appelmans
- (Netherlands) M Oremans
7
6

- (Belgium) S Appelmans
- (Netherlands) M Oremans
6
6

- (Belgium) E Callens
- (Italy) E Savoldi
6
4

- (Belgium) S Appelmans
- (Netherlands) M Oremans
4
7
6

WC
- (United States) Ra Jensen
- (United States) Re Jensen
6
3
1

9
- (Italy) L Golarsa
- (Russia) E Maniokova
6
6
2

- (Netherlands) M Koutstaal
- (Australia) N Pratt
3
6
6

- (Netherlands) M Koutstaal
- (Australia) N Pratt
2
2

9
- (Italy) L Golarsa
- (Russia) E Maniokova
6
6

=== Bottom half ===
==== Section 3 ====
First round

Second round

Third round

Quarterfinals

8
- (South Africa) A Coetzer
- (Argentina) I Gorrochategui
6
3
6

- (United States) A Keller
- (Australia) L Pleming
6
6

- (United States) A Keller
- (Australia) L Pleming
2
6
2

- (Slovakia) K Habšudová
- (Slovakia) R Zrubáková
2
3

8
- (South Africa) A Coetzer
- (Argentina) I Gorrochategui
4
6
4

- (Russia) E Likhovtseva
- (Australia) A Scott
2
6
6

16
- (Bulgaria) K Maleeva
- (Ukraine) N Medvedeva
6
1
6

LL
- (Argentina) M-F Landa
- (United Kingdom) J Moore
6
1
3

- (Russia) E Likhovtseva
- (Australia) A Scott
0
4

16
- (Bulgaria) K Maleeva
- (Ukraine) N Medvedeva
6
6

16
- (Bulgaria) K Maleeva
- (Ukraine) N Medvedeva
7
2
1

4
- (United States) M McGrath
- (Latvia) L Neiland
6
6
6

12
- (Australia) N Bradtke
- (Australia) K Radford
7
6

- (United Kingdom) V Lake
- (Czech Republic) P Langrová
2
3

- (Italy) R Grande
- (South Africa) J Kruger
6
2

- (Italy) R Grande
- (South Africa) J Kruger
6
6

12
- (Australia) N Bradtke
- (Australia) K Radford
6
4
2

Q
- (Japan) E Iida
- (Japan) H Nagano
6
6

4
- (United States) M McGrath
- (Latvia) L Neiland
2
6
6

- (France) K Quentrec-Eagle
- (France) S Testud
0
3

Q
- (Japan) E Iida
- (Japan) H Nagano
5
0

4
- (United States) M McGrath
- (Latvia) L Neiland
7
6

==== Section 4 ====
First round

Second round

Third round

Quarterfinals

6
- (Netherlands) M Bollegraf
- (Australia) R Stubbs
7
6

- (United States) G Helgeson-Nielsen
- (Australia) R McQuillan
6
6
3

- (France) S Amiach
- (France) I Demongeot
5
3

- (France) S Amiach
- (France) I Demongeot
7
2
6

6
- (Netherlands) M Bollegraf
- (Australia) R Stubbs
6
6

- (Romania) R Dragomir
- (Italy) L Garrone
4
6
2

13
- (South Africa) E Reinach
- (Romania) I Spîrlea
3
4

- (Netherlands) K Boogert
- (Netherlands) N Muns-Jagerman
6
4
6

- (Netherlands) K Boogert
- (Netherlands) N Muns-Jagerman
3
2

13
- (South Africa) E Reinach
- (Romania) I Spîrlea
6
6

6
- (Netherlands) M Bollegraf
- (Australia) R Stubbs
6
5

2
- (Czech Republic) J Novotná
- (Spain) A Sánchez Vicario
7
7

10
- (United States) K Adams
- (United States) Z Garrison-Jackson
6
7

- (Germany) A Huber
- (Germany) C Porwik
7
6
6

- (Germany) A Huber
- (Germany) C Porwik
2
5

- (Sweden) M Lindström
- (Sweden) M Strandlund
6
7
4

10
- (United States) K Adams
- (United States) Z Garrison-Jackson
2
2

- (United States) N Arendt
- (Germany) C Singer
6
6

2
- (Czech Republic) J Novotná
- (Spain) A Sánchez Vicario
6
6

- (Sweden) Å Carlsson
- (Austria) P Schwarz
2
2

- (United States) N Arendt
- (Germany) C Singer
6
4

2
- (Czech Republic) J Novotná
- (Spain) A Sánchez Vicario
7
6
