= 1996 Lipton Championships =

- Date: March 22–31
- Edition: 12th
- Surface: Hard / outdoor
- Location: Key Biscayne, Florida, U.S.
- Venue: Tennis Center at Crandon Park

Champions

Men's singles
- (United States) Andre Agassi

Women's singles
- (Germany) Steffi Graf

Men's doubles
- (Australia) Todd Woodbridge / (Australia) Mark Woodforde

Women's doubles
- (Czech Republic) Jana Novotná / (Spain) Arantxa Sánchez Vicario
← 1995 ·	Miami Open	· 1997 →

The 1996 Lipton Championships was a tennis tournament played on outdoor hard courts. It was the 12th edition of the Miami Masters and was part of the Mercedes Super 9 of the 1996 ATP Tour and of Tier I of the 1996 WTA Tour. Both the men's and women's events took place at the Tennis Center at Crandon Park on Key Biscayne, Florida in the United States from March 22 through March 31, 1996.

== Finals ==
=== Men's singles ===
(United States) Andre Agassi defeated (Croatia) Goran Ivanišević 3–0 (Ivanišević retired)

- It was Agassi's 1st title of the year and the 33rd of his career. It was his 3rd win at the event, having also won in 1990 and 1995.

=== Women's singles ===
(Germany) Steffi Graf defeated (United States) Chanda Rubin 6–1, 6–3

- It was Graf's 2nd title of the year and the 109th of her career. It was her 5th win at the event, having also won in 1987, 1988, 1994 and 1995.

=== Men's doubles ===
(Australia) Todd Woodbridge / (Australia) Mark Woodforde defeated (South Africa) Ellis Ferreira / (United States) Patrick Galbraith 6–1, 6–3

- It was Woodbridge's 4th title of the year and the 44th of his career. It was Woodforde's 5th title of the year and the 48th of his career.

=== Women's doubles ===
(Czech Republic) Jana Novotná / (Spain) Arantxa Sánchez Vicario defeated (United States) Meredith McGrath / (Latvia) Larisa Neiland 6–4, 6–4

- It was Novotná's 2nd title of the year and the 68th of her career. It was Sánchez Vicario's 2nd title of the year and the 64th of her career.
