= 1995 Lipton Championships =

- Date: March 17–26
- Edition: 11th
- Category: Championship Series, Single Week (men); Tier I (women)
- Prize money: $2,250,000 (men) $1,550,000 (women)
- Surface: Hard / outdoor
- Location: Key Biscayne, Florida, U.S.
- Venue: Tennis Center at Crandon Park

Champions

Men's singles
- (United States) Andre Agassi

Women's singles
- (Germany) Steffi Graf

Men's doubles
- (Australia) Todd Woodbridge / (Australia) Mark Woodforde

Women's doubles
- (Czech Republic) Jana Novotná / (Spain) Arantxa Sánchez Vicario
← 1994 ·	Miami Open	· 1996 →

The 1995 Lipton Championships was a combined men's and women's tennis tournament played on outdoor hard courts. It was the 11th edition of the Lipton Championships and was part of the Championship Series of the 1995 ATP Tour and of Tier I of the 1995 WTA Tour. The tournament took place at the Tennis Center at Crandon Park in Key Biscayne, Florida in the United States from March 17 through March 26, 1995. Andre Agassi and Steffi Graf won the singles titles.

== Finals ==
=== Men's singles ===
(United States) Andre Agassi defeated (United States) Pete Sampras 3–6, 6–2, 7–6^{(7–3)}

- It was Agassi's 3rd title of the year and the 28th of his career.

=== Women's singles ===
(Germany) Steffi Graf defeated (Japan) Kimiko Date 6–1, 6–4

- It was Graf's 3rd title of the year and the 100th of her career.

=== Men's doubles ===
(Australia) Todd Woodbridge / (Australia) Mark Woodforde defeated (United States) Jim Grabb / (United States) Patrick McEnroe 6–3, 7–6

- It was Woodbridge's 2nd title of the year and the 29th of his career. It was Woodforde's 2nd title of the year and the 34th of his career.

=== Women's doubles ===
(Czech Republic) Jana Novotná / (Spain) Arantxa Sánchez Vicario defeated (United States) Gigi Fernández / (Belarus) Natasha Zvereva 7–5, 2–6, 6–3

- It was Novotná's 5th title of the year and the 68th of her career. It was Sánchez Vicario's 2nd title of the year and the 59th of her career.

== See also ==
- Agassi–Sampras rivalry
