= 2001 Ericsson Open =

- Date: March 21 – April 1
- Edition: 17th
- Category: ATP Masters Series (men); Tier I Series (women)
- Surface: Hard / outdoor
- Location: Key Biscayne, Florida, U.S.
- Venue: Tennis Center at Crandon Park

Champions

Men's singles
- (United States) Andre Agassi

Women's singles
- (United States) Venus Williams

Men's doubles
- (Czech Republic) Jiří Novák / (Czech Republic) David Rikl

Women's doubles
- (Spain) Arantxa Sánchez Vicario / (France) Nathalie Tauziat
- Miami Open

The 2001 Ericsson Open was a tennis tournament played on outdoor hard courts. It was the 17th edition of the Miami Masters and was part of the Tennis Masters Series of the 2001 ATP Tour and of Tier I of the 2001 WTA Tour. Both the men's and women's events took place at the Tennis Center at Crandon Park in Key Biscayne, Florida in the United States from March 21 through April 1, 2001.

== Finals ==
=== Men's singles ===
(United States) Andre Agassi defeated (United States) Jan-Michael Gambill 7–6^{(7–4)}, 6–1, 6–0

- It was Agassi's 3rd title of the year and the 49th of his career. It was his 2nd Masters title of the year and his 12th overall. It was his 4th title at the event after winning in 1990, 1995 and 1996.

=== Women's singles ===
(United States) Venus Williams defeated (United States) Jennifer Capriati 4–6, 6–1, 7–6^{(7–4)}

- It was Williams' 2nd title of the year and the 26th of her career. It was her 1st Tier I title of the year and her 5th overall. It was her 3rd title at the event after winning in 1998 and 1999.

=== Men's doubles ===
(Czech Republic) Jiří Novák / (Czech Republic) David Rikl defeated (Sweden) Jonas Björkman / (Australia) Todd Woodbridge 7–5, 7–6^{(7–3)}

- It was Novák's 1st title of the year and the 16th of his career. It was Rikl's 1st title of the year and the 20th of his career.

=== Women's doubles ===
(Spain) Arantxa Sánchez Vicario / (France) Nathalie Tauziat defeated (United States) Lisa Raymond / (Australia) Rennae Stubbs 6–0, 6–4

- It was Sánchez Vicario's 1st title of the year and the 93rd of her career. It was Tauziat's 1st title of the year and the 30th of his career.
