= 1994 Lipton Championships =

- Date: March 11–21
- Edition: 10th
- Category: Championship Series (men); Tier I (women)
- Prize money: $1,625,000 (men) $1,000,000 (women)
- Surface: Hard / outdoor
- Location: Key Biscayne, Florida, U.S.
- Venue: Tennis Center at Crandon Park

Champions

Men's singles
- (United States) Pete Sampras

Women's singles
- (Germany) Steffi Graf

Men's doubles
- (Netherlands) Jacco Eltingh / (Netherlands) Paul Haarhuis

Women's doubles
- (United States) Gigi Fernández / (Belarus) Natasha Zvereva
- Miami Open

The 1994 Lipton Championships was a tennis tournament played on outdoor hard courts. It was the 10th edition of the Miami Masters and was part of the Super 9 of the 1994 ATP Tour and of Tier I of the 1994 WTA Tour. The tournament was held at the Tennis Center at Crandon Park in Key Biscayne, Florida in the United States from March 11 through March 21, 1994.

== Finals ==
=== Men's singles ===
(United States) Pete Sampras defeated (United States) Andre Agassi 5–7, 6–3, 6–3

- It was Sampras' 4th title of the year and the 26th of his career.

=== Women's singles ===
(Germany) Steffi Graf defeated (Belarus) Natasha Zvereva 4–6, 6–1, 6–2

- It was Graf's 5th singles title of the year and the 84th of her career.

=== Men's doubles ===
(Netherlands) Jacco Eltingh / (Netherlands) Paul Haarhuis defeated (The Bahamas) Mark Knowles / (United States) Jared Palmer 7–6, 7–6

- It was Eltingh's 3rd title of the year and the 17th of his career. It was Haarhuis' 3rd title of the year and the 16th of his career.

=== Women's doubles ===
(United States) Gigi Fernández / (Belarus) Natasha Zvereva defeated (United States) Patty Fendick / (United States) Meredith McGrath 6–3, 6–1

- It was Fernández's 3rd title of the year and the 47th of her career. It was Zvereva's 4th title of the year and the 47th of her career.

== See also ==
- Agassi–Sampras rivalry
