= Tennis Center at Crandon Park =

Tennis stadium and complex in Florida, U.S.

Coordinates: 25°42′29″N 80°09′32″W

Crandon Park Tennis Center
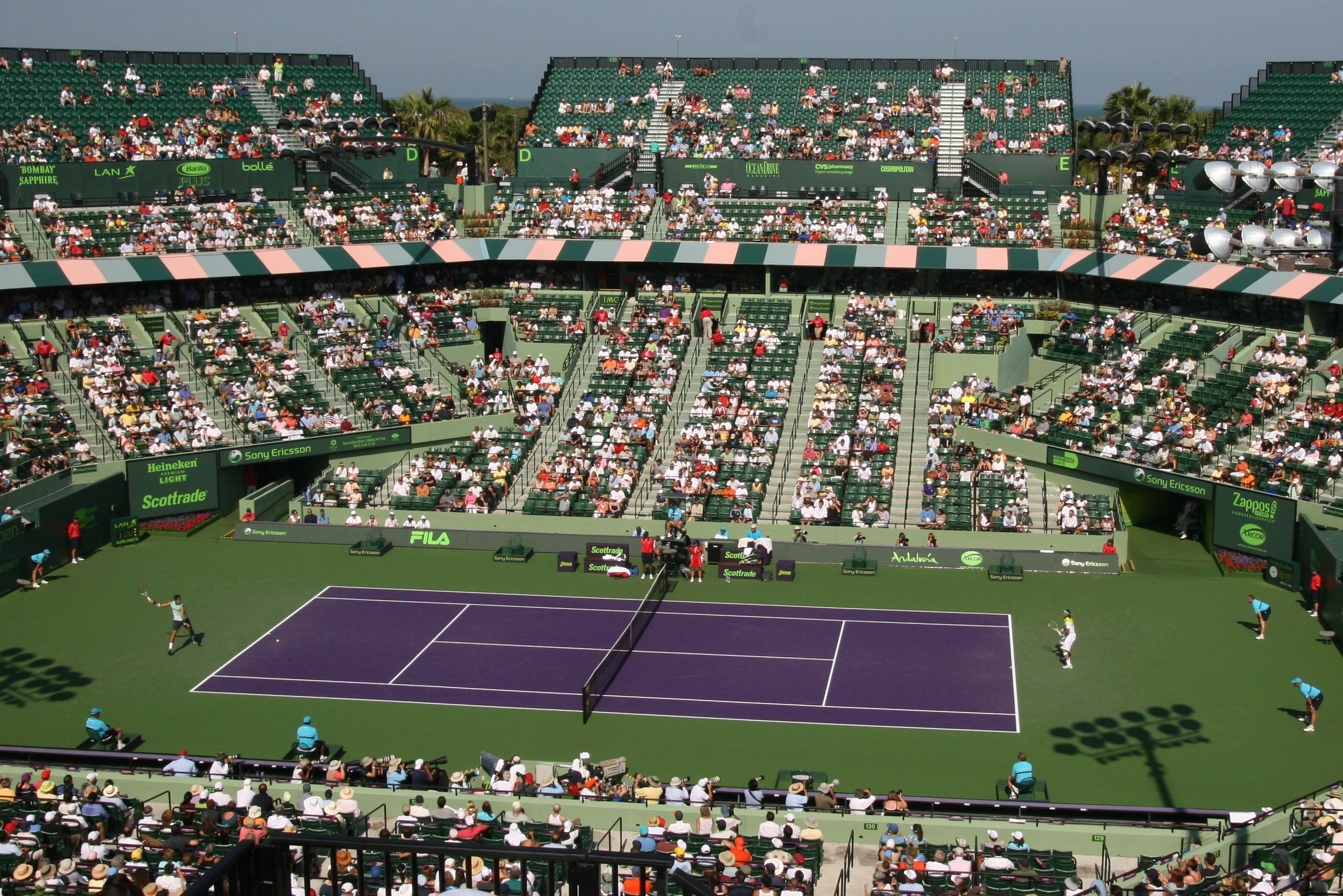
- Interactive map of Crandon Park Tennis Center
- Location: Key Biscayne, Florida, United States
- Capacity: 13,800 (Stadium Court)
- Surface: Hard (Laykold), Outdoors

Construction
- Groundbreaking: April 1992
- Opened: 1994
- Cost: $ 21 million
- Architect: Rossetti Architects

Tenants
- Miami Open (1987–2018); Junior Orange Bowl (1999–2010)

The Crandon Park Tennis Center is a tennis facility in Key Biscayne, Florida. It features a 13,800-seat venue named Stadium Court as its centerpiece, and was home of the Miami Open from 1987 until 2018. The Miami Open used twelve courts for competition courts, plus six practice courts. The facility is also home to two European red clay courts, four American green clay courts, and two grass courts. During the majority of the year when the Miami Open is not on site, the Tennis Center is a Miami-Dade County park that is open to the public year-round. All aforementioned playing surfaces, including the stadium court, are available for public use. There are 27 courts in total, including 13 that are lighted.

The Tennis Center at Crandon Park was the third home of the Miami Open. It began in Delray Beach in 1985 and moved to Boca Raton in 1986, before settling in Key Biscayne in 1987. The Miami Open then moved to Hard Rock Stadium in Miami Gardens starting in 2019. The Tennis Center is also home to the United States Tennis Association's player development program headquarters and from 1999 to 2010 the 16-and-under Junior Orange Bowl.

During the 2013 Miami Masters, plans were unveiled to fully renovate Crandon Park Tennis Center which would include building three permanent show courts. Legal issues regarding restrictions on the Park's usage prevented the plan's implementation. The subsequent move of the Miami Open to Hard Rock Stadium presumably ended any efforts to redevelop the site.

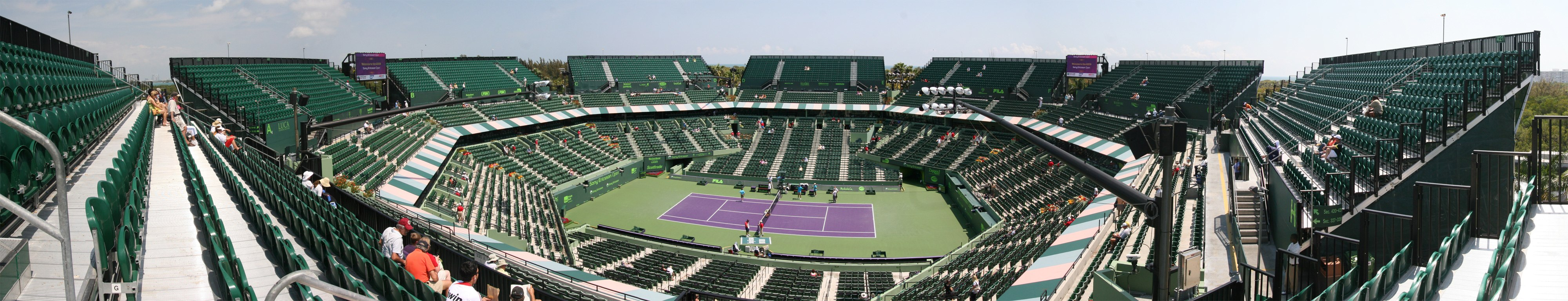
Tennis Center at Crandon Park panorama

== See also ==
- List of tennis stadiums by capacity
