= 1999 Lipton Championships – Women's doubles qualifying =

Women's doubles qualifying
- 1999 Lipton Championships

Events
Singles	men	women
Doubles	men	women
← 1998 ·	Lipton Championships	· 2000 →

The 1999 Evert Cup was a WTA tennis tournament, played on outdoor hard courts.

== Players ==
=== Seeds ===
1. (Brazil) Vanessa Menga / (Germany) Elena Wagner (champions)
2. (Russia) Eugenia Kulikovskaya / (Germany) Marlene Weingärtner (qualifying competition)

=== Qualifiers ===
1. (Brazil) Vanessa Menga / (Germany) Elena Wagner

== Qualifying draw ==
=== Key ===
- Q = Qualifier
- WC = Wild card
- LL = Lucky loser
- Alt = Alternate
- SE = Special exempt
- PR = Protected ranking
- ITF = ITF entry
- JE = Junior exempt
- w/o = Walkover
- r = Retired
- d = Defaulted
- SR = Special ranking

First round
1	(Brazil) Vanessa Menga (Germany) Elena Wagner	8
(Russia) Alina Jidkova (Canada) Renata Kolbovic	0
(Spain) Mariam Ramon Climent (Paraguay) Larissa Schaerer	9
WC	(United States) Jane Chi (United States) Brie Rippner	8
(Switzerland) Emmanuelle Gagliardi (Italy) Adriana Serra Zanetti	5
(Slovakia) Henrieta Nagyová (Austria) Sylvia Plischke	8
(South Africa) Surina De Beer (Australia) Annabel Ellwood	4
2	(Russia) Eugenia Kulikovskaya (Germany) Marlene Weingärtner	8

Second round
1	(Brazil) Vanessa Menga (Germany) Elena Wagner	8
(Spain) Mariam Ramon Climent (Paraguay) Larissa Schaerer	3
(Slovakia) Henrieta Nagyová (Austria) Sylvia Plischke	4
2	(Russia) Eugenia Kulikovskaya (Germany) Marlene Weingärtner	8

Qualifying competition
1	(Brazil) Vanessa Menga (Germany) Elena Wagner	8
2	(Russia) Eugenia Kulikovskaya (Germany) Marlene Weingärtner	4
