= 2004 SEAT Open =

- Date: 25–31 October
- Edition: 9th
- Category: Tier III
- Draw: 30S / 16D
- Prize money: $225,000
- Surface: Hard / indoor
- Location: Kockelscheuer, Luxembourg

Champions

Singles
- (Australia) Alicia Molik

Doubles
- (Spain) Virginia Ruano Pascual (Argentina) Paola Suárez
| ← 2003 · | Luxembourg Open | · 2005 → |

The 2004 SEAT Open was a women's tennis tournament played on indoor hard courts in Kockelscheuer, Luxembourg which was part of Tier III of the 2004 WTA Tour. It was the 9th edition of the tournament and was held from 25 October until 31 October 2004. Second-seeded Alicia Molik won the singles title and earned $35,000 first-prize money.

== Finals ==
=== Singles ===
(Australia) Alicia Molik defeated (Russia) Dinara Safina, 6–3, 6–4

- This was Molik's 3rd singles title of the year and the 4th of her career.

=== Doubles ===
(Spain) Virginia Ruano Pascual / (Argentina) Paola Suárez defeated (United States) Jill Craybas / (Germany) Marlene Weingärtner, 6–1, 6–7^{(1–7)}, 6–3
