= 1998 Lipton Championships – Women's singles =

Women's singles
- 1998 Lipton Championships

Final
- Champion: (United States) Venus Williams
- Runner-up: (Russia) Anna Kournikova
- Score: 2–6, 6–4, 6–1

Details
- Draw: 96
- Seeds: 32

Events
Singles	men	women
Doubles	men	women
← 1997 ·	Lipton Championships	· 1999 →

Venus Williams defeated Anna Kournikova in the final, 2–6, 6–4, 6–1 to win the women's singles tennis title at the 1998 Miami Open.

Martina Hingis was the defending champion, but lost in the semifinals to Williams.

== Seeds ==
A champion seed is indicated in bold text while text in italics indicates the round in which that seed was eliminated. All thirty-two seeds received a bye to the second round.

1. (Switzerland) Martina Hingis (semifinals)
2. (United States) Lindsay Davenport (quarterfinals)
3. (Czech Republic) Jana Novotná (quarterfinals)
4. n/a
5. (United States) Monica Seles (third round)
6. (South Africa) Amanda Coetzer (fourth round)
7. n/a
8. (Spain) Arantxa Sánchez-Vicario (semifinals)
9. (Spain) Conchita Martínez (fourth round)
10. (Romania) Irina Spîrlea (second round)
11. (United States) **Venus Williams (champion)**
12. (France) Nathalie Tauziat (fourth round)
13. (France) Sandrine Testud (fourth round)
14. (Germany) Anke Huber (fourth round)
15. (Belgium) Dominique Van Roost (second round)
16. (Japan) Ai Sugiyama (third round)
17. (Switzerland) Patty Schnyder (fourth round)
18. (Belgium) Sabine Appelmans (third round)
19. (Belarus) Natasha Zvereva (third round)
20. (Romania) Ruxandra Dragomir (second round)
21. (South Africa) Joannette Kruger (third round)
22. (Netherlands) Brenda Schultz-McCarthy (second round)
23. (Russia) Anna Kournikova (final)
24. (Austria) Barbara Paulus (third round)
25. (Indonesia) Yayuk Basuki (third round)
26. (Slovakia) Henrieta Nagyová (third round)
27. (Austria) Barbara Schett (second round)
28. (Japan) Naoko Sawamatsu (third round)
29. (Italy) Silvia Farina (quarterfinals)
30. (Venezuela) Maria Vento (fourth round)
31. (Argentina) Florencia Labat (third round)
32. (France) Sarah Pitkowski (second round)
33. (Thailand) Tamarine Tanasugarn (third round)
34. (Italy) Rita Grande (fourth round)

== Draw ==
=== Key ===
- Q = Qualifier
- WC = Wild card
- LL = Lucky loser
- Alt = Alternate
- SE = Special exempt
- PR = Protected ranking
- ITF = ITF entry
- JE = Junior exempt
- w/o = Walkover
- r = Retired
- d = Defaulted
- SR = Special ranking

=== Finals ===
Quarterfinals
1	(Switzerland) Martina Hingis	6	1	7
(United States) Serena Williams	3	6	6
11	(United States) Venus Williams	6	6
29	(Italy) Silvia Farina	1	2
8	(Spain) Arantxa Sánchez-Vicario	6	6
3	(Czech Republic) Jana Novotná	1	1
23	(Russia) Anna Kournikova	6	2	6
2	(United States) Lindsay Davenport	4	6	2

Semifinals
1	(Switzerland) Martina Hingis	2	7	2
11	(United States) Venus Williams	6	5	6
8	(Spain) Arantxa Sánchez-Vicario	6	1	3
23	(Russia) Anna Kournikova	3	6	6

Final
11	(United States) Venus Williams	2	6	6
23	(Russia) Anna Kournikova	6	4	1

=== Top half ===
==== Section 1 ====
First round
LL	(Czech Republic) L Němečková	3	3
(United States) C Rubin	6	6
Q	(France) L Ghirardi	4	7	1
(United States) A Miller	6	6	6
(Canada) P Hy-Boulais	0	6	5
WC	(United States) L McNeil	6	1	7
WC	(United States) B Rippner	6	5
(Sweden) Å Carlsson	7	7

Second round
1	(Switzerland) M Hingis	6	6
(United States) C Rubin	1	0
(United States) A Miller	4	0
21	(South Africa) J Kruger	6	6
27	(Austria) B Schett	2	2
WC	(United States) L McNeil	6	6
(Sweden) Å Carlsson	1	2
13	(France) S Testud	6	6

Third round
1	(Switzerland) M Hingis	6	6
21	(South Africa) J Kruger	0	0
WC	(United States) L McNeil	3	3
13	(France) S Testud	6	6

Fourth round
1	(Switzerland) M Hingis	6	5	6
13	(France) S Testud	3	7	2

==== Section 2 ====
First round
(United States) S Williams	6	6
(Czech Republic) D Chládková	4	0
(Czech Republic) A Gerši	1	2
(Japan) M Saeki	6	6
WC	(United States) A Stevenson	6	3	2
(Spain) C Torrens Valero	2	6	6
(Germany) W Probst	3	6	3
(Slovakia) K Habšudová	6	4	6

Second round
10	(Romania) I Spîrlea	6	0
(United States) S Williams	7	6
(Japan) M Saeki	6	3
24	(Austria) B Paulus	7	6
17	(Switzerland) P Schnyder	6	6
(Spain) C Torrens Valero	0	3
(Slovakia) K Habšudová	1	6	2
33	(Thailand) T Tanasugarn	6	3	6

Third round
(United States) S Williams	6	6
24	(Austria) B Paulus	3	2
17	(Switzerland) P Schnyder	6	6
33	(Thailand) T Tanasugarn	0	2

Fourth round
(United States) S Williams	6	4	6
17	(Switzerland) P Schnyder	0	6	3

==== Section 3 ====
First round
(Austria) S Plischke	7	7
(Slovakia) K Studeníková	6	5
(Italy) L Golarsa	5	1
(France) A Mauresmo	7	6
(Belarus) O Barabanschikova	7	2	6
Q	(France) N Dechy	6	6	1
LL	(Russia) T Panova	6	7
WC	(United States) M Washington	2	5

Second round
34	(Italy) R Grande	3	6	6
(Austria) S Plischke	6	3	2
(France) A Mauresmo	5	6
25	(Indonesia) Y Basuki	7	7
32	(France) S Pitkowski	4	0	r
(Belarus) O Barabanschikova	6	1
LL	(Russia) T Panova	3	3
11	(United States) V Williams	6	6

Third round
34	(Italy) R Grande	6	3	6
25	(Indonesia) Y Basuki	4	6	4
(Belarus) O Barabanschikova	2	1
11	(United States) V Williams	6	6

Fourth round
34	(Italy) R Grande	1	4
11	(United States) V Williams	6	6

==== Section 4 ====
First round
Q	(United States) J Watanabe	6	3	2
(Germany) B Rittner	1	6	6
(Spain) G León García	6	7
LL	(Australia) A Ellwood	4	5
(Australia) K-A Guse	6	5	1
(Japan) Y Yoshida	0	7	6
(France) A Dechaume-Balleret	3	6	6
(Netherlands) M Oremans	6	3	2

Second round
16	(Japan) A Sugiyama	6	6
(Germany) B Rittner	2	3
(Spain) G León García	4	1
29	(Italy) S Farina	6	6
19	(Belarus) N Zvereva	6	6
(Japan) Y Yoshida	3	4
(France) A Dechaume-Balleret	7	3	3
6	(South Africa) A Coetzer	5	6	6

Third round
16	(Japan) A Sugiyama	3	5
29	(Italy) S Farina	6	7
19	(Belarus) N Zvereva	5	3
6	(South Africa) A Coetzer	7	6

Fourth round
29	(Italy) S Farina	6	6	6
6	(South Africa) A Coetzer	7	2	1

=== Bottom half ===
==== Section 5 ====
First round
(Italy) F Lubiani	4	1
(Chinese Taipei) S-T Wang	6	6
(Russia) E Makarova	5	r
WC	(United States) T Snyder	7
(Latvia) L Neiland	6	3	6
(Czech Republic) S Kleinová	1	6	2
(Slovakia) J Husárová	3	2
(Russia) E Likhovtseva	6	6

Second round
8	(Spain) A Sánchez-Vicario	4	6	6
(Chinese Taipei) S-T Wang	6	4	2
WC	(United States) T Snyder	5	4
31	(Argentina) F Labat	7	6
30	(Venezuela) M Vento	7	6
(Latvia) L Neiland	5	3
(Russia) E Likhovtseva	6	1
15	(Belgium) D Van Roost	1	0	r

Third round
8	(Spain) A Sánchez-Vicario	6	6
31	(Argentina) F Labat	0	1
30	(Venezuela) M Vento	7	5	6
(Russia) E Likhovtseva	5	7	3

Fourth round
8	(Spain) A Sánchez-Vicario	6	6
30	(Venezuela) M Vento	2	1

==== Section 6 ====
First round
(Japan) N Kijimuta	1	4
Q	(Chinese Taipei) J Lee	6	6
(Spain) M Serna	6	5	3
(France) J Halard-Decugis	3	7	6
Q	(Germany) J Kandarr	6	6
(France) A Fusai	4	3
(Poland) M Grzybowska	6	7
WC	(United States) J Capriati	0	5

Second round
14	(Germany) A Huber	2	6	6
Q	(Chinese Taipei) J Lee	6	4	4
(France) J Halard-Decugis	2	1
18	(Belgium) S Appelmans	6	6
22	(Netherlands) B Schultz-McCarthy	1	4
Q	(Germany) J Kandarr	6	6
(Poland) M Grzybowska	1	1
3	(Czech Republic) J Novotná	6	6

Third round
14	(Germany) A Huber	6	6	6
18	(Belgium) S Appelmans	7	4	4
Q	(Germany) J Kandarr	3	6	3
3	(Czech Republic) J Novotná	6	4	6

Fourth round
14	(Germany) A Huber	2	2
3	(Czech Republic) J Novotná	6	6

==== Section 7 ====
First round
(Spain) M Sánchez Lorenzo	6	6
(United States) S Cacic	3	3
Q	(Argentina) M Díaz Oliva	3	0
(Croatia) M Lučić	6	6
WC	(Puerto Rico) K Brandi	6	5	6
(United States) C Morariu	3	7	4
Q	(Israel) A Smashnova	6	6
(Spain) V Ruano Pascual	1	1

Second round
5	(United States) M Seles	6	6	6
(Spain) M Sánchez Lorenzo	4	7	3
(Croatia) M Lučić	4	2
23	(Russia) A Kournikova	6	6
28	(Japan) N Sawamatsu	7	6
WC	(Puerto Rico) K Brandi	5	3
Q	(Israel) A Smashnova	4	2
9	(Spain) C Martínez	6	6

Third round
5	(United States) M Seles	5	4
23	(Russia) A Kournikova	7	6
28	(Japan) N Sawamatsu	2	2
9	(Spain) C Martínez	6	6

Fourth round
23	(Russia) A Kournikova	6	6
9	(Spain) C Martínez	3	0

==== Section 8 ====
First round
(Italy) S Cecchini	5	2
WC	(United States) A Wunderlich	7	6
WC	(United States) S Reeves	3	2
(Germany) M Babel	6	6
(China) F Li	7	6
(Australia) R McQuillan	6	2
Q	(Bulgaria) P Stoyanova	0	6	6
(United States) A Frazier	6	3	4

Second round
12	(France) N Tauziat	7	6
WC	(United States) A Wunderlich	5	4
(Germany) M Babel	2	1
26	(Slovakia) H Nagyová	6	6
20	(Romania) R Dragomir	6	6	4
(China) F Li	2	7	6
Q	(Bulgaria) P Stoyanova	2	2
2	(United States) L Davenport	6	6

Third round
12	(France) N Tauziat	6	6
26	(Slovakia) H Nagyová	1	1
(China) F Li	6	1	3
2	(United States) L Davenport	3	6	6

Fourth round
12	(France) N Tauziat	1	2
2	(United States) L Davenport	6	6
