= 2003 SEAT Open – Singles =

Singles
- 2003 SEAT Open

Final
- Champion: (Belgium) Kim Clijsters
- Runner-up: (United States) Chanda Rubin
- Score: 6–2, 7–5

Details
- Draw: 30 (2WC/4Q)
- Seeds: 8

Events
Singles	Doubles
← 2002 ·	Luxembourg Open	· 2004 →

Kim Clijsters was the defending champion and successfully defended her title, by defeating Chanda Rubin 6–2, 7–5 in the final.

== Seeds ==
The first two seeds received a bye into the second round.

1. (Belgium) Kim Clijsters (champion)
2. (United States) Chanda Rubin (final)
3. (Greece) Eleni Daniilidou (quarterfinals)
4. (Thailand) Tamarine Tanasugarn (second round)
5. (Russia) Maria Sharapova (semifinals)
6. (Slovenia) Katarina Srebotnik (first round)
7. (Australia) Alicia Molik (quarterfinals, retired)
8. (Spain) María Sánchez Lorenzo (first round)

== Draw ==
Key

- Q = Qualifier
- WC = Wild card
- LL = Lucky loser
- Alt = Alternate
- ITF = ITF entry
- PR = Protected ranking
- SR = Special ranking
- SE = Special exempt
- JE = Junior exempt
- JR = Junior Accelerator Programme entrant
- CO = College Accelerator Programme entrant
- NG = Next Gen Accelerator Program entrant
- w/o = Walkover
- r = Retired
- d = Defaulted

=== Finals ===
Semifinals
1	(Belgium) Kim Clijsters	6	6
5	(Russia) Maria Sharapova	0	3
(Germany) Marlene Weingärtner	2	5
2	(United States) Chanda Rubin	6	7

Final
1	(Belgium) Kim Clijsters	6	7
2	(United States) Chanda Rubin	2	5

=== Top half ===
First round
(Spain) V Ruano Pascual	6^{6}	4
(Luxembourg) C Schaul	7^{8}	6
(Italy) F Pennetta	7	5	3
(United States) L Granville	5	7	6
(France) É Loit	6	6
8	(Spain) M Sánchez Lorenzo	3	2
4	(Thailand) T Tanasugarn	6	6
WC	(Belgium) E Clijsters	2	3
(Australia) N Pratt	3	4
(Germany) A Barna	6	6
(United States) T Ashley	3	0
Q	(Sweden) S Arvidsson	6	6
WC	(Belgium) K Flipkens	2	6^{7}
5	(Russia) M Sharapova	6	7^{9}

Second round
1	(Belgium) K Clijsters	6	6
(Luxembourg) C Schaul	3	1
(United States) L Granville	3	3
(France) É Loit	6	6
4	(Thailand) T Tanasugarn	3	4
(Germany) A Barna	6	6
Q	(Sweden) S Arvidsson	1	6^{4}
5	(Russia) M Sharapova	6	7^{7}

Quarterfinals
1	(Belgium) K Clijsters	6	7
(France) É Loit	4	5
(Germany) A Barna	6	3	2
5	(Russia) M Sharapova	4	6	6

Semifinals
1	(Belgium) K Clijsters	6	6
5	(Russia) M Sharapova	0	3

=== Bottom half ===
First round
6	(Slovenia) K Srebotnik	5	3
(Venezuela) M Sequera	7	6
(Switzerland) E Gagliardi	3	3
(Germany) M Weingärtner	6	6
(Zimbabwe) C Black	6	6
Q	(Ukraine) J Vakulenko	1	4
(France) S Cohen-Aloro	6^{5}	2
3	(Greece) E Daniilidou	7^{7}	6
7	(Australia) A Molik	6	6
(Italy) R Grande	3	3
(Ukraine) E Tatarkova	6	0	1
(Spain) A Medina Garrigues	2	6	6
Q	(France) S Foretz	6	6
Q	(Germany) B Rittner	1	2

Second round
(Venezuela) M Sequera	1	4
(Germany) M Weingärtner	6	6
(Zimbabwe) C Black	4	1
3	(Greece) E Daniilidou	6	6
7	(Australia) A Molik	6	6
(Spain) A Medina Garrigues	4	1
Q	(France) S Foretz	6	4	3
2	(United States) C Rubin	3	6	6

Quarterfinals
(Germany) M Weingärtner	6	6
3	(Greece) E Daniilidou	2	1
7	(Australia) A Molik	7	4^{r}
2	(United States) C Rubin	5	5

Semifinals
(Germany) M Weingärtner	2	5
2	(United States) C Rubin	6	7
