= 2004 SEAT Open – Singles =

Singles
- 2004 SEAT Open

Final
- Champion: (Australia) Alicia Molik
- Runner-up: (Russia) Dinara Safina
- Score: 6–3, 6–4

Details
- Draw: 30
- Seeds: 8

Events
Singles	Doubles
← 2003 ·	Luxembourg Open	· 2005 →

Kim Clijsters was the defending champion, but did not compete this year due to an injury on her left wrist.

Second-seeded Alicia Molik won the title by defeating Dinara Safina 6–3, 6–4 in the final.

== Seeds ==
The top two seeds received a bye into the second round.

1. (Argentina) Paola Suárez (second round)
2. (Australia) Alicia Molik (champion)
3. (Italy) Silvia Farina Elia (semifinals)
4. (Bulgaria) Magdalena Maleeva (first round)
5. (France) Mary Pierce (second round)
6. (France) Tatiana Golovin (quarterfinals)
7. (Greece) Eleni Daniilidou (second round)
8. (Japan) Shinobu Asagoe (second round)

== Draw ==
Key

- Q = Qualifier
- WC = Wild card
- LL = Lucky loser
- Alt = Alternate
- ITF = ITF entry
- PR = Protected ranking
- SR = Special ranking
- SE = Special exempt
- JE = Junior exempt
- JR = Junior Accelerator Programme entrant
- CO = College Accelerator Programme entrant
- NG = Next Gen Accelerator Program entrant
- w/o = Walkover
- r = Retired
- d = Defaulted

=== Finals ===
Semifinals
(Spain) Anabel Medina Garrigues	6	1	2
(Russia) Dinara Safina	4	6	6
3	(Italy) Silvia Farina Elia	2	2
2	(Australia) Alicia Molik	6	6

Final
(Russia) Dinara Safina	3	4
2	(Australia) Alicia Molik	6	6

=== Top half ===
First round
(Italy) T Garbin	2	4
(Spain) A Medina Garrigues	6	6
WC	(Luxembourg) A Kremer	3	1
(Serbia and Montenegro) A Ivanovic	6	6
Q	(Netherlands) M Krajicek	0	7^{7}	1
8	(Japan) S Asagoe	6	6^{1}	6
4	(Bulgaria) M Maleeva	7	4	3
Q	(Finland) E Laine	5	6	6
(Russia) D Safina	6	6
Q	(Italy) An Serra Zanetti	4	0
(Madagascar) D Randriantefy	6	6
(United States) M Washington	4	2
WC	(United States) C Gullickson	0	5
5	(France) M Pierce	6	7

Second round
1	(Argentina) P Suárez	6	3	4
(Spain) A Medina Garrigues	3	6	6
(Serbia and Montenegro) A Ivanovic	4	6	6
8	(Japan) S Asagoe	6	4	1
Q	(Finland) E Laine	2	1
(Russia) D Safina	6	6
(Madagascar) D Randriantefy	6	3	6
5	(France) M Pierce	4	6	3

Quarterfinals
(Spain) A Medina Garrigues	3	6	6
(Serbia and Montenegro) A Ivanovic	6	4	1
(Russia) D Safina	6	6
(Madagascar) D Randriantefy	1	4

Semifinals
(Spain) A Medina Garrigues	6	1	2
(Russia) D Safina	4	6	6

=== Bottom half ===
First round
7	(Greece) E Daniilidou	7	6
(United States) J Craybas	5	1
Q/PR	(Czech Republic) K Peschke	6^{8}	6	6
(Luxembourg) C Schaul	7^{10}	2	0
(Slovenia) T Pisnik	6	6
(France) V Razzano	1	1
(France) S Foretz	3	2
3	(Italy) S Farina Elia	6	6
6	(France) T Golovin	6	6
(Germany) AL Grönefeld	2	3
(Germany) A Barna	5	7	4
(Germany) M Weingärtner	7	5	6
(Spain) M Sánchez Lorenzo	6	6
(Spain) V Ruano Pascual	4	3

Second round
7	(Greece) E Daniilidou	3	4
Q/PR	(Czech Republic) K Peschke	6	6
(Slovenia) T Pisnik	4	0
3	(Italy) S Farina Elia	6	6
6	(France) T Golovin	6	6
(Germany) M Weingärtner	3	4
(Spain) M Sánchez Lorenzo	6^{3}	6^{2}
2	(Australia) A Molik	7^{7}	7^{7}

Quarterfinals
Q/PR	(Czech Republic) K Peschke	6	2	1
3	(Italy) S Farina Elia	3	6	6
6	(France) T Golovin	6	4	4
2	(Australia) A Molik	3	6	6

Semifinals
3	(Italy) S Farina Elia	2	2
2	(Australia) A Molik	6	6

== Qualifying ==
=== Seeds ===
1. (Italy) Antonella Serra Zanetti (qualified)
2. (Israel) Tzipora Obziler (second round)
3. (Russia) Maria Kirilenko (qualifying competition)
4. (Colombia) Catalina Castaño (second round)
5. (Belgium) Els Callens (first round)
6. (France) ~~Capucine Rousseau~~ (Still playing at Saint-Raphaël)
7. (Ukraine) Alona Bondarenko (second round)
8. (United States) Meilen Tu (first round)
9. (Russia) Lioudmila Skavronskaia (first round)

=== Qualifiers ===
1. (Italy) Antonella Serra Zanetti
2. (Netherlands) Michaëlla Krajicek
3. (Czech Republic) Květa Peschke
4. (Finland) Emma Laine

=== Qualifying draw ===
==== First qualifier ====
First round
1	(Italy) Antonella Serra Zanetti	6	6
(Russia) Ekaterina Bychkova	4	4
(Belarus) Tatiana Poutchek	7	0	2
(Estonia) Maret Ani	5	6	6
(United Kingdom) Amanda Janes	2	4
(Czech Republic) Eva Hrdinová	6	6
(Germany) Angelika Bachmann	6	1	3
7	(Ukraine) Alona Bondarenko	4	6	6

Second round
1	(Italy) Antonella Serra Zanetti	6	6
(Estonia) Maret Ani	3	3
(Czech Republic) Eva Hrdinová	6	6
7	(Ukraine) Alona Bondarenko	3	4

Qualifying competition
1	(Italy) Antonella Serra Zanetti	6	6
(Czech Republic) Eva Hrdinová	4	2

==== Second qualifier ====
First round
2	(Israel) Tzipora Obziler	6	6
(France) Youlia Fedossova	2	1
(Croatia) Ivana Abramović	3	4
WC	(Netherlands) Michaëlla Krajicek	6	6
(Germany) Martina Müller	5	0^{r}
WC	(Luxembourg) Mandy Minella	7	3
(Germany) Vanessa Henke	6	6^{5}	6
9	(Russia) Lioudmila Skavronskaia	2	7^{7}	2

Second round
2	(Israel) Tzipora Obziler	6^{4}	2
WC	(Netherlands) Michaëlla Krajicek	7^{7}	6
WC	(Luxembourg) Mandy Minella	6	6^{5}	6
(Germany) Vanessa Henke	3	7^{7}	3

Qualifying competition
WC	(Netherlands) Michaëlla Krajicek	2	6	7^{10}
WC	(Luxembourg) Mandy Minella	6	3	6^{8}

==== Third qualifier ====
First round
3	(Russia) Maria Kirilenko	7	6
(United Kingdom) Elena Baltacha	5	1
(Germany) Sabrina Jolk	6^{6}	1
(Russia) Anastasia Rodionova	7^{8}	6
(Belgium) Debbrich Feys	7^{7}	2	4
(Czech Republic) Libuše Průšová	6^{2}	6	6
PR	(Czech Republic) Květa Peschke	6	6
8	(United States) Meilen Tu	1	2

Second round
3	(Russia) Maria Kirilenko	6	6
(Russia) Anastasia Rodionova	4	2
(Czech Republic) Libuše Průšová	2	1
PR	(Czech Republic) Květa Peschke	6	6

Qualifying competition
3	(Russia) Maria Kirilenko	4	6	0
PR	(Czech Republic) Květa Peschke	6	1	6

==== Fourth qualifier ====
First round
4	(Colombia) Catalina Castaño	7	6
WC	(Luxembourg) Martine Poos	5	1
WC	(Luxembourg) Lynn Philippe	3	2
(Finland) Emma Laine	6	6
(Ukraine) Yuliya Beygelzimer	6	7^{8}
(Italy) Adriana Serra Zanetti	4	6^{6}
(Germany) Sandra Klösel	1	6	7
5	(Belgium) Els Callens	6	3	5

Second round
4	(Colombia) Catalina Castaño	6^{5}	6	6^{3}
(Finland) Emma Laine	7^{7}	4	7^{7}
(Ukraine) Yuliya Beygelzimer	6^{1}	6	1
(Germany) Sandra Klösel	7^{7}	2	6

Qualifying competition
(Finland) Emma Laine	6	4	6
(Germany) Sandra Klösel	1	6	3
