= 2003 SEAT Open – Doubles =

Doubles
- 2003 SEAT Open

Final
- Champions: (Russia) Maria Sharapova (Thailand) Tamarine Tanasugarn
- Runners-up: (Ukraine) Elena Tatarkova (Germany) Marlene Weingärtner
- Score: 6–1, 6–4

Details
- Draw: 16 (1WC/1Q)
- Seeds: 4

Events
Singles	Doubles
← 2002 ·	Luxembourg Open	· 2004 →

Kim Clijsters and Janette Husárová were the defending champions, but none competed this year. Clijsters decided to focus on the singles tournament, which she ended winning.

Maria Sharapova and Tamarine Tanasugarn won the title by defeating Elena Tatarkova and Marlene Weingärtner 6–1, 6–4 in the final.

== Seeds ==
1. (France) Émilie Loit / (Australia) Nicole Pratt (quarterfinals)
2. (Slovenia) Tina Križan / (Slovenia) Katarina Srebotnik (quarterfinals)
3. (Switzerland) Emmanuelle Gagliardi / (Germany) Barbara Rittner (first round)
4. (France) Stéphanie Cohen-Aloro / (Greece) Eleni Daniilidou (first round)

== Draw ==
Key

- Q = Qualifier
- WC = Wild card
- LL = Lucky loser
- Alt = Alternate
- ITF = ITF entry
- PR = Protected ranking
- SR = Special ranking
- SE = Special exempt
- JE = Junior exempt
- JR = Junior Accelerator Programme entrant
- CO = College Accelerator Programme entrant
- NG = Next Gen Accelerator Program entrant
- w/o = Walkover
- r = Retired
- d = Defaulted

=== Draw ===
First round
1	(France) É Loit (Australia) N Pratt	6	6
Q	(Russia) V Dushevina (France) E Trouche	1	1
(Germany) A Barna (Spain) A Medina Garrigues	2	6	6
(Belgium) E Clijsters (United States) L Osterloh	6	3	4
4	(France) S Cohen-Aloro (Greece) E Daniilidou	4	4
(Hungary) K Marosi (Ukraine) J Vakulenko	6	6
(United States) L Granville (Venezuela) M Sequera	5	4
(Ukraine) E Tatarkova (Germany) M Weingärtner	7	6
(Czech Republic) L Průšová (Italy) M Santangelo	7^{7}	6
WC	(Belgium) K Flipkens (Luxembourg) C Schaul	6^{3}	2
(Russia) G Fokina (Ukraine) M Koryttseva	1	6	6
3	(Switzerland) E Gagliardi (Germany) B Rittner	6	2	4
(Russia) M Sharapova (Thailand) T Tanasugarn	6	6
(Germany) K Freye (Germany) A Rösch	2	0
(Italy) T Garbin (Italy) F Pennetta	3	6	2
2	(Slovenia) T Križan (Slovenia) K Srebotnik	6	4	6

Quarterfinals
1	(France) É Loit (Australia) N Pratt	4	1
(Germany) A Barna (Spain) A Medina Garrigues	6	6
(Hungary) K Marosi (Ukraine) J Vakulenko	1	4
(Ukraine) E Tatarkova (Germany) M Weingärtner	6	6
(Czech Republic) L Průšová (Italy) M Santangelo	3	5
(Russia) G Fokina (Ukraine) M Koryttseva	6	7
(Russia) M Sharapova (Thailand) T Tanasugarn	6	6
2	(Slovenia) T Križan (Slovenia) K Srebotnik	4	3

Semifinals
(Germany) A Barna (Spain) A Medina Garrigues	4	6	0
(Ukraine) E Tatarkova (Germany) M Weingärtner	6	4	6
(Russia) G Fokina (Ukraine) M Koryttseva	6^{2}	7^{8}	0
(Russia) M Sharapova (Thailand) T Tanasugarn	7^{7}	6^{6}	6

Final
(Ukraine) E Tatarkova (Germany) M Weingärtner	1	4
(Russia) M Sharapova (Thailand) T Tanasugarn	6	6
