= 1999 Lipton Championships – Women's doubles =

Women's doubles
- 1999 Lipton Championships

Final
- Champions: (Switzerland) Martina Hingis (Czech Republic) Jana Novotná
- Runners-up: (United States) Mary Joe Fernández (United States) Monica Seles
- Score: 0–6, 6–4, 7–6^{(7–1)}

Events
| Singles | men | women |
| Doubles | men | women |
| ← 1998 · | Lipton Championships | · 2000 → |

The 1999 Lipton Championships women's doubles was the women's doubles event of the fifteenth edition of the tennis tournament played at Miami, United States. It is the third WTA Tier I tournament of the year, and part of the US Spring tennis season. Martina Hingis and Jana Novotná were the defending champions and won in the final 0–6, 6–4, 7–6^{(7–1)} against Mary Joe Fernández and Monica Seles.

== Seeds ==
All sixteen seeded teams received byes into the second round.

1. (Switzerland) Martina Hingis / (Czech Republic) Jana Novotná (champions)
2. (Russia) Anna Kournikova / (Russia) Elena Likhovtseva (semifinals)
3. (France) Alexandra Fusai / (France) Nathalie Tauziat (second round)
4. (Latvia) Larisa Neiland / (Spain) Arantxa Sánchez Vicario (quarterfinals)
5. (South Africa) Mariaan de Swardt / (Ukraine) Elena Tatarkova (quarterfinals)
6. (Spain) Conchita Martínez / (Argentina) Patricia Tarabini (third round, retired)
7. (United States) Serena Williams / (United States) Venus Williams (third round, withdrew)
8. (Romania) Irina Spîrlea / (Netherlands) Caroline Vis (third round)
9. (Austria) Barbara Schett / (Switzerland) Patty Schnyder (second round)
10. (France) Mary Pierce / (Belarus) Natasha Zvereva (third round, withdrew)
11. (Belgium) Els Callens / (France) Julie Halard-Decugis (second round)
12. (Spain) Virginia Ruano Pascual / (Argentina) Paola Suárez (second round)
13. (Italy) Silvia Farina / (Slovakia) Karina Habšudová (quarterfinals)
14. (United States) Mary Joe Fernández / (United States) Monica Seles (final)
15. (Australia) Kristine Kunce / (United States) Kimberly Po (second round)
16. (Australia) Catherine Barclay / (United States) Lori McNeil (second round)

== Draw ==
=== Key ===
- Q = Qualifier
- WC = Wild card
- LL = Lucky loser
- Alt = Alternate
- ITF = ITF entry
- PR = Protected ranking
- SR = Special ranking
- SE = Special exempt
- JE = Junior exempt
- JR = Junior Accelerator Programme entrant
- CO = College Accelerator Programme entrant
- NG = Next Gen Accelerator Program entrant
- w/o = Walkover
- r = Retired
- d = Defaulted

=== Finals ===
Quarterfinals

Semifinals

Final

1
- (Switzerland) Martina Hingis
- (Czech Republic) Jana Novotná
7^{7}
6

13
- (Italy) Silvia Farina
- (Slovakia) Karina Habšudová
6^{3}
3

1
- (Switzerland) Martina Hingis
- (Czech Republic) Jana Novotná
1
7^{7}
6

- (Zimbabwe) Cara Black
- (Kazakhstan) Irina Selyutina
6
6^{4}
1

- (Romania) Cătălina Cristea
- (Romania) Ruxandra Dragomir
5
7^{9}
4

- (Zimbabwe) Cara Black
- (Kazakhstan) Irina Selyutina
7
6^{7}
6

1
- (Switzerland) Martina Hingis
- (Czech Republic) Jana Novotná
0
6
7^{7}

14
- (United States) Mary Joe Fernández
- (United States) Monica Seles
6
4
6^{1}

14
- (United States) Mary Joe Fernández
- (United States) Monica Seles
5
6
7^{7}

4
- (Latvia) Larisa Neiland
- (Spain) Arantxa Sánchez Vicario
7
4
6^{3}

14
- (United States) Mary Joe Fernández
- (United States) Monica Seles
6
6

2
- (Russia) Anna Kournikova
- (Russia) Elena Likhovtseva
2
1

5
- (South Africa) Mariaan de Swardt
- (Ukraine) Elena Tatarkova
3
6
6^{3}

2
- (Russia) Anna Kournikova
- (Russia) Elena Likhovtseva
6
4
7^{7}

=== Top half ===
==== Section 1 ====
First round

Second round

Third round

Quarterfinals

1
- (Switzerland) M Hingis
- (Czech Republic) J Novotná
6
6

- (Czech Republic) K Hrdličková
- (Slovenia) T Križan
6
6

- (Czech Republic) K Hrdličková
- (Slovenia) T Križan
4
3

- (United States) K Adams
- (Japan) M Saeki
4
2

1
- (Switzerland) M Hingis
- (Czech Republic) J Novotná
w/o

- (Netherlands) S Noorlander
- (Greece) C Papadáki
0
3

10
- (France) M Pierce
- (Belarus) N Zvereva

- (Germany) A Huber
- (United States) C Morariu
6
6

- (Germany) A Huber
- (United States) C Morariu
6
6^{4}
1

10
- (France) M Pierce
- (Belarus) N Zvereva
2
7^{7}
6

1
- (Switzerland) M Hingis
- (Czech Republic) J Novotná
7^{7}
6

13
- (Italy) S Farina
- (Slovakia) K Habšudová
6^{3}
3

13
- (Italy) S Farina
- (Slovakia) K Habšudová
6
6

- (Argentina) I Gorrochategui
- (Germany) S Graf
6
6

- (Argentina) I Gorrochategui
- (Germany) S Graf
4
4

WC
- (United States) T Snyder
- (United States) M Washington
1
3

13
- (Italy) S Farina
- (Slovakia) K Habšudová
w/o

Q
- (Brazil) V Menga
- (Germany) E Wagner
7
3
2

7
- (United States) S Williams
- (United States) V Williams

- (United States) D Graham
- (Italy) R Grande
5
6
6

- (United States) D Graham
- (Italy) R Grande
4
5

7
- (United States) S Williams
- (United States) V Williams
6
7

==== Section 2 ====
First round

Second round

Third round

Quarterfinals

3
- (France) A Fusai
- (France) N Tauziat
6
1
3

- (Sweden) Å Carlsson
- (Belgium) L Courtois
6
6^{4}
1^{r}

- (Romania) C Cristea
- (Romania) R Dragomir
0
6
6

- (Romania) C Cristea
- (Romania) R Dragomir
1
7^{7}
3

- (Romania) C Cristea
- (Romania) R Dragomir
7^{9}
3
7^{7}

- (United States) E deLone
- (Australia) N Pratt
7
6

- (United States) E deLone
- (Australia) N Pratt
6^{7}
6
6^{4}

- (Canada) M Drake
- (Croatia) M Murić
5
3

- (United States) E deLone
- (Australia) N Pratt
6
6

16
- (Australia) C Barclay
- (United States) L McNeil
4
4

- (Romania) C Cristea
- (Romania) R Dragomir
5
7^{9}
4

- (Zimbabwe) C Black
- (Kazakhstan) I Selyutina
7
6^{7}
6

12
- (Spain) V Ruano Pascual
- (Argentina) P Suárez
1
5

- (Zimbabwe) C Black
- (Kazakhstan) I Selyutina
6
6^{5}
6

- (Zimbabwe) C Black
- (Kazakhstan) I Selyutina
6
7

- (Bulgaria) P Stoyanova
- (Slovakia) R Zrubáková
3
7^{7}
2

- (Zimbabwe) C Black
- (Kazakhstan) I Selyutina
2
6
4

- (United States) A Frazier
- (United States) K Schlukebir
6
3
6

6
- (Spain) C Martínez
- (Argentina) P Tarabini
6
1
0^{r}

- (Chinese Taipei) J Lee
- (Thailand) T Tanasugarn
1
6
4

- (United States) A Frazier
- (United States) K Schlukebir
6
5
4

6
- (Spain) C Martínez
- (Argentina) P Tarabini
1
7
6

=== Bottom half ===
==== Section 3 ====
First round

Second round

Third round

Quarterfinals

8
- (Romania) I Spîrlea
- (Netherlands) C Vis
6
3
6

- (United States) N Arendt
- (Netherlands) M Bollegraf
4
6
7

- (United States) N Arendt
- (Netherlands) M Bollegraf
3
6
1

- (Germany) B Rittner
- (Belgium) D Van Roost
6
4
5

8
- (Romania) I Spîrlea
- (Netherlands) C Vis
3
0

- (United States) C Rubin
- (France) S Testud
6
7

14
- (United States) MJ Fernández
- (United States) M Seles
6
6

- (Belgium) S Appelmans
- (Netherlands) M Oremans
2
5

- (United States) C Rubin
- (France) S Testud
6
3
4

14
- (United States) MJ Fernández
- (United States) M Seles
4
6
6

14
- (United States) MJ Fernández
- (United States) M Seles
5
6
7^{7}

4
- (Latvia) L Neiland
- (Spain) A Sánchez Vicario
7
4
6^{3}

11
- (Belgium) E Callens
- (France) J Halard-Decugis
6^{3}
6
1

- (United States) S Cacic
- (Canada) S Jeyaseelan
0
1

- (France) A Dechaume-Balleret
- (France) A Mauresmo
7^{7}
2
6

- (France) A Dechaume-Balleret
- (France) A Mauresmo
6
6

- (France) A Dechaume-Balleret
- (France) A Mauresmo
3
4

- (Italy) T Garbin
- (Argentina) L Montalvo
7^{7}
7^{7}

4
- (Latvia) L Neiland
- (Spain) A Sánchez Vicario
6
6

- (South Africa) A Coetzer
- (South Africa) J Steck
6^{5}
6^{5}

- (Italy) T Garbin
- (Argentina) L Montalvo
2
3

4
- (Latvia) L Neiland
- (Spain) A Sánchez Vicario
6
6

==== Section 4 ====
First round

Second round

Third round

Quarterfinals

5
- (South Africa) M de Swardt
- (Ukraine) E Tatarkova
6
6

- (South Africa) N de Villiers
- (Czech Republic) E Melicharová
3
2

- (Japan) N Miyagi
- (United States) L Wild
2
1

- (Japan) N Miyagi
- (United States) L Wild
6
6

5
- (South Africa) M de Swardt
- (Ukraine) E Tatarkova
6
6

- (Poland) A Olsza
- (Chinese Taipei) Wang S-t
6
6

- (Poland) A Olsza
- (Chinese Taipei) Wang S-t
3
4

- (Belarus) O Barabanschikova
- (South Africa) L Horn
3
1

- (Poland) A Olsza
- (Chinese Taipei) Wang S-t
6
6

15
- (Australia) K Kunce
- (United States) K Po
4
4

5
- (South Africa) M de Swardt
- (Ukraine) E Tatarkova
3
6
6^{3}

2
- (Russia) A Kournikova
- (Russia) E Likhovtseva
6
4
7^{7}

9
- (Austria) B Schett
- (Switzerland) P Schnyder
3
2

- (Netherlands) K Boogert
- (France) A-G Sidot
6
6

- (Netherlands) K Boogert
- (France) A-G Sidot
6
6

- (United States) L Osterloh
- (United States) S Reeves
3
2

- (Netherlands) K Boogert
- (France) A-G Sidot
6
3
6^{4}

- (Germany) C Singer
- (Czech Republic) H Vildová
4
3

2
- (Russia) A Kournikova
- (Russia) E Likhovtseva
3
6
7^{7}

WC
- (United States) J Capriati
- (Croatia) I Majoli
6
6

WC
- (United States) J Capriati
- (Croatia) I Majoli

2
- (Russia) A Kournikova
- (Russia) E Likhovtseva
w/o

== Qualifying ==
=== Seeds ===
1. (Brazil) Vanessa Menga / (Germany) Elena Wagner (champions)
2. (Russia) Eugenia Kulikovskaya / (Germany) Marlene Weingärtner (qualifying competition)

=== Qualifiers ===
1. (Brazil) Vanessa Menga / (Germany) Elena Wagner

== Qualifying draw ==
=== Key ===
- Q = Qualifier
- WC = Wild card
- LL = Lucky loser
- Alt = Alternate
- ITF = ITF entry
- PR = Protected ranking
- SR = Special ranking
- SE = Special exempt
- JE = Junior exempt
- JR = Junior Accelerator Programme entrant
- CO = College Accelerator Programme entrant
- NG = Next Gen Accelerator Program entrant
- w/o = Walkover
- r = Retired
- d = Defaulted

First round

Second round

Qualifying competition

1
- (Brazil) Vanessa Menga
- (Germany) Elena Wagner
8

- (Russia) Alina Jidkova
- (Canada) Renata Kolbovic
0

1
- (Brazil) Vanessa Menga
- (Germany) Elena Wagner
8

- (Spain) Mariam Ramón Climent
- (Paraguay) Larissa Schaerer
3

- (Spain) Mariam Ramón Climent
- (Paraguay) Larissa Schaerer
9

WC
- (United States) Jane Chi
- (United States) Brie Rippner
8

1
- (Brazil) Vanessa Menga
- (Germany) Elena Wagner
8

2
- (Russia) Eugenia Kulikovskaya
- (Germany) Marlene Weingärtner
4

- (Switzerland) Emmanuelle Gagliardi
- (Italy) Adriana Serra Zanetti
5

- (Slovakia) Henrieta Nagyová
- (Austria) Sylvia Plischke
8

- (Slovakia) Henrieta Nagyová
- (Austria) Sylvia Plischke
4

2
- (Russia) Eugenia Kulikovskaya
- (Germany) Marlene Weingärtner
8

- (South Africa) Surina De Beer
- (Australia) Annabel Ellwood
4

2
- (Russia) Eugenia Kulikovskaya
- (Germany) Marlene Weingärtner
8
