= Emilie Trouche =

French tennis player

- Country (sports): France
- Born: 17 August 1985 (age 39)
- Plays: Right-handed
- Prize money: $12,071

Singles
- Career record: 20–74
- Highest ranking: No. 590 (21 March 2005)

Doubles
- Career record: 7–14
- Career titles: 2 ITF
- Highest ranking: No. 508 (20 September 2004)

Emilie Trouche (born 17 August 1985) is a French former professional tennis player.

Trouche made her only WTA Tour main draw appearance at the 2003 SEAT Open, partnering Russian Vera Dushevina in the doubles. But the First Round lost French Émilie Loit and Australian Nicole Pratt.

== ITF finals ==
Legend
$10,000 tournaments

=== Doubles: 2 (2–0) ===
Outcome	No.	Date	Tournament	Surface	Partner	Opponents	Score
Winner	1.	28 September 2003	Murcia, Spain	Clay	(France) Delphine De Winne	(China) Chen Yanchong (China) Gao Quan	7–6^{(8)}, 6–2
Winner	2.	30 August 2004	Mollerussa, Spain	Hard	(Denmark) Karina Jacobsgaard	(Germany) Sabine Lisicki (France) Nelly Maillard	w/o
