= 1998 Lipton Championships – Men's singles =

Men's singles
- 1998 Lipton Championships

Final
- Champion: (Chile) Marcelo Ríos
- Runner-up: (United States) Andre Agassi
- Score: 7–5, 6–3, 6–4

Details
- Draw: 96 (12Q / 6WC)
- Seeds: 32

Events
Singles	men	women
Doubles	men	women
← 1997 ·	Lipton Championships	· 1999 →

Marcelo Ríos defeated Andre Agassi in the final, 7–5, 6–3, 6–4 to win the men's singles tennis title at the 1998 Miami Open. With the win, he completed the Sunshine Double and overtook Pete Sampras' No. 1 ranking; Ríos to this day remains the only ATP world No. 1 without having won a Grand Slam title.

Thomas Muster was the reigning champion, but did not participate this year.

== Seeds ==
All thirty-two seeds received a bye to the second round.

1. (United States) Pete Sampras (third round)
2. (Czech Republic) Petr Korda (fourth round)
3. (Chile) Marcelo Ríos (champion)
4. (Australia) Patrick Rafter (second round)
5. (United Kingdom) Greg Rusedski (fourth round)
6. (Russia) Yevgeny Kafelnikov (fourth round)
7. (Sweden) Jonas Björkman (third round)
8. (Spain) Álex Corretja (semifinals)
9. (United States) ~~Michael Chang~~ (withdrew)
10. (Brazil) Gustavo Kuerten (quarterfinals)
11. (Slovakia) Karol Kučera (third round)
12. (Spain) Félix Mantilla (second round)
13. (Spain) Sergi Bruguera (second round)
14. (France) Cédric Pioline (third round)
15. (Australia) Mark Philippoussis (second round)
16. (Spain) Carlos Moyà (third round)
17. (Spain) Alberto Berasategui (second round)
18. (United Kingdom) Tim Henman (semifinals)
19. (Spain) Álbert Costa (fourth round)
20. (Croatia) Goran Ivanišević (fourth round)
21. (Sweden) Magnus Norman (second round)
22. (Sweden) Thomas Enqvist (quarterfinals, retired)
23. (France) Fabrice Santoro (fourth round)
24. (Ukraine) Andriy Medvedev (third round)
25. (Germany) Nicolas Kiefer (fourth round)
26. (Sweden) Magnus Larsson (second round)
27. (Switzerland) Marc Rosset (third round)
28. (Netherlands) Jan Siemerink (third round)
29. (United States) Andre Agassi (final)
30. (Germany) Tommy Haas (third round)
31. (Spain) Francisco Clavet (third round)
32. (South Africa) Wayne Ferreira (fourth round)

== Draw ==
Key

- Q = Qualifier
- WC = Wild card
- LL = Lucky loser
- Alt = Alternate
- ITF = ITF entry
- PR = Protected ranking
- SR = Special ranking
- SE = Special exempt
- JE = Junior exempt
- JR = Junior Accelerator Programme entrant
- CO = College Accelerator Programme entrant
- NG = Next Gen Accelerator Program entrant
- w/o = Walkover
- r = Retired
- d = Defaulted

=== Finals ===
Quarterfinals
Q	(United States) Steve Campbell	3	1
8	(Spain) Àlex Corretja	6	6
29	(United States) Andre Agassi	6	6
(United States) Jeff Tarango	4	3
22	(Sweden) Thomas Enqvist	3	0^{r}
3	(Chile) Marcelo Ríos	6	2
10	(Brazil) Gustavo Kuerten	2	4
18	(United Kingdom) Tim Henman	6	6

Semifinals
8	(Spain) Àlex Corretja	4	2
29	(United States) Andre Agassi	6	6
3	(Chile) Marcelo Ríos	6	4	6
18	(United Kingdom) Tim Henman	2	6	0

Final
29	(United States) Andre Agassi	5	3	4
3	(Chile) Marcelo Ríos	7	6	6

=== Top half ===
==== Section 1 ====
First round
(Zimbabwe) W Black	6	4	1
(Spain) J Sánchez	1	6	6
LL	(United States) M Sell	6	3	2
(Belgium) F Dewulf	1	6	6
(United States) T Martin	4	7^{7}	7
(France) J Golmard	6	6^{4}	5
(Germany) O Gross	4	2
Q	(United States) S Campbell	6	6

Second round
1	(United States) P Sampras	6	6
(Spain) J Sánchez	1	2
(Belgium) F Dewulf	5	7^{7}	4
32	(South Africa) W Ferreira	7	6^{2}	6
17	(Spain) A Berasategui	3	4
(United States) T Martin	6	6
Q	(United States) S Campbell	3	6	6
15	(Australia) M Philippoussis	6	3	3

Third round
1	(United States) P Sampras	6	6^{6}	3
32	(South Africa) W Ferreira	0	7^{8}	6
(United States) T Martin	6	5	6^{4}
Q	(United States) S Campbell	1	7	7^{7}

Fourth round
32	(South Africa) W Ferreira	7^{7}	2	5
Q	(United States) S Campbell	6^{3}	6	7

==== Section 2 ====
First round
(France) A Clément	4	2
Q	(Germany) C Vinck	6	6
LL	(Argentina) G Cañas	7	6
(United States) R Reneberg	5	3
(Spain) G Blanco	7	6
(Australia) J Stoltenberg	5	4
(United States) J Courier	6	6
WC	(Czech Republic) R Vašek	1	0

Second round
LL	(Argentina) S Prieto	3	6	6
Q	(Germany) C Vinck	6	3	4
LL	(Argentina) G Cañas	6	6^{3}	1
23	(France) F Santoro	2	7^{7}	6
26	(Sweden) M Larsson	4	6^{1}
(Spain) G Blanco	6	7^{7}
(United States) J Courier	6^{11}	3
8	(Spain) À Corretja	7^{13}	6

Third round
LL	(Argentina) S Prieto	2	3
23	(France) F Santoro	6	6
(Spain) G Blanco	3	1
8	(Spain) À Corretja	6	6

Fourth round
23	(France) F Santoro	1	6	3
8	(Spain) À Corretja	6	3	6

==== Section 3 ====
First round
(Spain) J Alonso	6	4	4
(United States) V Spadea	3	6	6
WC	(Australia) L Hewitt	4	6	4
(France) N Escudé	6	3	6
(Armenia) S Sargsian	6	6
Q	(Belgium) D Norman	4	2
WC	(Argentina) L Arnold Ker	6	3	6
(Belgium) J van Herck	1	6	1

Second round
4	(Australia) P Rafter	3	5
(United States) V Spadea	6	7
(France) N Escudé	2	3
29	(United States) A Agassi	6	6
19	(Spain) Á Costa	7	6
(Armenia) S Sargsian	5	1
WC	(Argentina) L Arnold Ker	4	3
14	(France) C Pioline	6	6

Third round
(United States) V Spadea	4	5
29	(United States) A Agassi	6	7
19	(Spain) Á Costa	7^{8}	3	6
14	(France) C Pioline	6^{6}	6	3

Fourth round
29	(United States) A Agassi	7^{7}	4	6
19	(Spain) Á Costa	6^{5}	6	1

==== Section 4 ====
First round
Q	(Canada) S Lareau	4	3
(Netherlands) P Haarhuis	6	6
(United States) J Tarango	6	7
(Germany) D Prinosil	1	5
(Italy) G Pozzi	6	6
Q	(Brazil) R Jabali	4	3
(Czech Republic) C Doseděl	3	7^{13}	6
(Ecuador) N Lapentti	6	6^{11}	4

Second round
12	(Spain) F Mantilla	7^{7}	4	6^{3}
(Netherlands) P Haarhuis	6^{3}	6	7^{7}
(United States) J Tarango	7	6
21	(Sweden) M Norman	5	0
28	(Netherlands) J Siemerink	6	6
(Italy) G Pozzi	3	2
(Czech Republic) C Doseděl	7^{7}	6^{5}	6^{5}
6	(Russia) Y Kafelnikov	6^{5}	7^{7}	7^{7}

Third round
(Netherlands) P Haarhuis	3	r
(United States) J Tarango	6
28	(Netherlands) J Siemerink	4	6^{5}
6	(Russia) Y Kafelnikov	6	7^{7}

Fourth round
(United States) J Tarango	3	6	6
6	(Russia) Y Kafelnikov	6	3	2

=== Bottom half ===
==== Section 5 ====
First round
(Slovakia) D Hrbatý	6	6
(Czech Republic) D Vacek	3	2
(Uruguay) M Filippini	1	6	6
Q	(Switzerland) I Heuberger	6	1	2
Q	(United States) D Wheaton	1	4
(Spain) C Costa	6	6
(France) G Raoux	6	7^{7}
(Czech Republic) J Novák	4	6^{3}

Second round
5	(United Kingdom) G Rusedski	6	6
(Slovakia) D Hrbatý	3	1
(Uruguay) M Filippini	6	4	2
27	(Switzerland) M Rosset	4	6	6
22	(Sweden) T Enqvist	6	5	6
(Spain) C Costa	1	7	1
(France) G Raoux	4	2
11	(Slovakia) K Kučera	6	6

Third round
5	(United Kingdom) G Rusedski	6	7^{10}
27	(Switzerland) M Rosset	1	6^{8}
22	(Sweden) T Enqvist	6	3	6
11	(Slovakia) K Kučera	3	6	3

Fourth round
5	(United Kingdom) G Rusedski	2	2
22	(Sweden) T Enqvist	6	6

==== Section 6 ====
First round
Q	(Netherlands) D van Scheppingen	6^{3}	7	6
(Australia) S Draper	7^{7}	5	3
Q	(South Africa) N Godwin	2	6^{2}
(Canada) D Nestor	6	7^{7}
(Australia) S Stolle	7^{7}	2	5
(Australia) M Tebbutt	6^{4}	6	7
(Germany) H Dreekmann	3	6	6
(Sweden) T Nydahl	6	1	4

Second round
13	(Spain) S Bruguera	6	4	3
Q	(Netherlands) D van Scheppingen	3	6	6
(Canada) D Nestor	6^{2}	4
20	(Croatia) G Ivanišević	7^{7}	6
30	(Germany) T Haas	6	6
(Australia) M Tebbutt	2	4
(Germany) H Dreekmann	3	4
3	(Chile) M Ríos	6	6

Third round
Q	(Netherlands) D van Scheppingen	3	4
20	(Croatia) G Ivanišević	6	6
30	(Germany) T Haas	4	3
3	(Chile) M Ríos	6	6

Fourth round
20	(Croatia) G Ivanišević	2	3
3	(Chile) M Ríos	6	6

==== Section 7 ====
First round
WC	(United States) J Salzenstein	4	3
LL	(India) L Paes	6	6
(Spain) J A Viloca	3	2
WC	(United States) M Washington	6	6
Q	(Russia) A Cherkasov	6	3	4
LL	(United States) B MacPhie	2	6	6
Q	(Spain) F Roig	7	2	6
(Czech Republic) B Ulihrach	5	6	1

Second round
7	(Sweden) J Björkman	6	6
LL	(India) L Paes	3	4
WC	(United States) M Washington	1	3
25	(Germany) N Kiefer	6	6
24	(Ukraine) A Medvedev	7	6
LL	(United States) B MacPhie	5	2
Q	(Spain) F Roig	6	2	6^{3}
10	(Brazil) G Kuerten	3	6	7^{7}

Third round
7	(Sweden) J Björkman	6^{6}	6^{3}
25	(Germany) N Kiefer	7^{8}	7^{7}
24	(Ukraine) A Medvedev	2	6	6^{5}
10	(Brazil) G Kuerten	6	4	7^{7}

Fourth round
25	(Germany) N Kiefer	4	7	4
10	(Brazil) G Kuerten	6	5	6

==== Section 8 ====
First round
WC	(United States) J-M Gambill	1	2
(Australia) M Woodforde	6	6
(Spain) E Benfele Álvarez	5	4
(South Africa) G Stafford	7	6
(United States) J Stark	6	6
LL	(Spain) O Burrieza	3	3
(Zimbabwe) B Black	6^{6}	7	6^{5}
Q	(Paraguay) R Delgado	7^{8}	5	7^{7}

Second round
16	(Spain) C Moyà	7^{7}	6
(Australia) M Woodforde	6^{2}	3
(South Africa) G Stafford	4	2
18	(United Kingdom) T Henman	6	6
31	(Spain) F Clavet	3	6	6
(United States) J Stark	6	3	4
Q	(Paraguay) R Delgado	2	6^{5}
2	(Czech Republic) P Korda	6	7^{7}

Third round
16	(Spain) C Moyà	1	4
18	(United Kingdom) T Henman	6	6
31	(Spain) F Clavet	4	6	3
2	(Czech Republic) P Korda	6	3	6

Fourth round
18	(United Kingdom) T Henman	6	6
2	(Czech Republic) P Korda	4	4
