= 2004 SEAT Open – Doubles =

Doubles
- 2004 SEAT Open

Final
- Champions: (Spain) Virginia Ruano Pascual (Argentina) Paola Suárez
- Runners-up: (United States) Jill Craybas (Germany) Marlene Weingärtner
- Score: 6–1, 6–7^{(1–7)}, 6–3

Events
Singles	Doubles
← 2003 ·	Luxembourg Open	· 2005 →

Maria Sharapova and Tamarine Tanasugarn were the defending champions, but none competed this year.

Virginia Ruano Pascual and Paola Suárez won the title by defeating Jill Craybas and Marlene Weingärtner 6–1, 6–7^{(1–7)}, 6–3 in the final.

== Seeds ==
1. (Spain) Virginia Ruano Pascual / (Argentina) Paola Suárez (champions)
2. (Estonia) Maret Ani / (United States) Meilen Tu (quarterfinals, withdrew due to a left quadriceps strain on Ani)
3. (Japan) Shinobu Asagoe / (Luxembourg) Claudine Schaul (quarterfinals)
4. (United States) Jill Craybas / (Germany) Marlene Weingärtner (final)

== Draw ==
=== Key ===
- Q = Qualifier
- WC = Wild card
- LL = Lucky loser
- Alt = Alternate
- SE = Special exempt
- PR = Protected ranking
- ITF = ITF entry
- JE = Junior exempt
- w/o = Walkover
- r = Retired
- d = Defaulted
- SR = Special ranking

=== Draw ===
First round
1	(Spain) V Ruano Pascual (Argentina) P Suárez	3	6	7
WC	(Netherlands) M Krajicek (Luxembourg) A Kremer	6	3	5
(Germany) V Henke (Czech Republic) K Peschke	6	6
(Ukraine) A Bondarenko (Russia) A Rodionova	2	3
3	(Japan) S Asagoe (Luxembourg) C Schaul	6	7^{7}
(Russia) M Kirilenko (Russia) D Safina	1	6^{4}
(Greece) E Daniilidou (Italy) T Garbin	6^{3}	3
(Germany) AL Grönefeld (Spain) A Medina Garrigues	7^{7}	6
(France) S Foretz (Italy) An Serra Zanetti	6	3	6
(Belarus) T Poutchek (United States) M Washington	2	6	3
(Ukraine) Y Beygelzimer (Czech Republic) L Průšová	3	2
4	(United States) J Craybas (Germany) M Weingärtner	6	6
(New Zealand) L Baker (Netherlands) K Kilsdonk	6	6
Q	(Russia) E Bychkova (Finland) E Laine	4	3
(Poland) K Jans (Poland) A Rosolska	2	6	2
2	(Estonia) M Ani (United States) M Tu	6	3	6

Quarterfinals
1	(Spain) V Ruano Pascual (Argentina) P Suárez	7^{8}	6
(Germany) V Henke (Czech Republic) K Peschke	6^{6}	3
3	(Japan) S Asagoe (Luxembourg) C Schaul	2	3
(Germany) AL Grönefeld (Spain) A Medina Garrigues	6	6
(France) S Foretz (Italy) An Serra Zanetti
4	(United States) J Craybas (Germany) M Weingärtner	w/o
(New Zealand) L Baker (Netherlands) K Kilsdonk	w/o
2	(Estonia) M Ani (United States) M Tu

Semifinals
1	(Spain) V Ruano Pascual (Argentina) P Suárez	7^{7}	6
(Germany) AL Grönefeld (Spain) A Medina Garrigues	6^{5}	4
4	(United States) J Craybas (Germany) M Weingärtner	6	6
(New Zealand) L Baker (Netherlands) K Kilsdonk	3	3

Final
1	(Spain) V Ruano Pascual (Argentina) P Suárez	6	6^{1}	6
4	(United States) J Craybas (Germany) M Weingärtner	1	7^{7}	3

== Qualifying ==
=== Seeds ===
1. (Germany) Anca Barna / (United States) Carly Gullickson (first round)
2. (Russia) Ekaterina Bychkova / (Finland) Emma Laine (qualified)

=== Qualifiers ===
1. (Russia) Ekaterina Bychkova / (Finland) Emma Laine

=== Qualifying draw ===
First round
1	(Germany) Anca Barna (United States) Carly Gullickson	3
(Germany) Angelika Bachmann (Czech Republic) Eva Hrdinová	8
(Colombia) Catalina Castaño (Israel) Tzipora Obziler	8^{4}
2	(Russia) Ekaterina Bychkova (Finland) Emma Laine	9^{7}

Qualifying competition
(Germany) Angelika Bachmann (Czech Republic) Eva Hrdinová	4	6	5
2	(Russia) Ekaterina Bychkova (Finland) Emma Laine	6	2	7
