= 1999 Lipton Championships =

- Date: March 15–28
- Edition: 15th
- Surface: Hard / outdoor
- Location: Key Biscayne, Florida, U.S.
- Venue: Tennis Center at Crandon Park

Champions

Men's singles
- (Netherlands) Richard Krajicek

Women's singles
- (United States) Venus Williams

Men's doubles
- (Zimbabwe) Wayne Black / (Australia) Sandon Stolle

Women's doubles
- (Switzerland) Martina Hingis / (Czech Republic) Jana Novotná
| ← 1998 · | Miami Open | · 2000 → |

The 1999 Lipton Championships was a tennis tournament played on outdoor hard courts. It was the 15th edition of the Miami Masters and was part of the Super 9 of the 1999 ATP Tour and of Tier I of the 1999 WTA Tour. Both the men's and women's events took place at the Tennis Center at Crandon Park in Key Biscayne, Florida in the United States from March 15 through March 28, 1999.

== Finals ==
=== Men's singles ===
(Netherlands) Richard Krajicek defeated (France) Sébastien Grosjean, 4–6, 6–1, 6–2, 7–5

- It was Krajicek's 2nd title of the year and the 20th of his career. It was his 1st Super 9 title of the year and his 2nd overall.

=== Women's singles ===
(United States) Venus Williams defeated (United States) Serena Williams, 6–1, 4–6, 6–4

- It was Williams' 2nd title of the year and the 5th of her career. It was her 1st Tier I title of the year and her 2nd overall. It was her 2nd title at the event having also won in 1998.

=== Men's doubles ===
(Zimbabwe) Wayne Black / (Australia) Sandon Stolle defeated (Germany) Boris Becker / (United States) Jan-Michael Gambill, 6–1, 6–1

=== Women's doubles ===
(Switzerland) Martina Hingis / (Czech Republic) Jana Novotná defeated (United States) Mary Joe Fernández / (United States) Monica Seles, 0–6, 6–4, 7–6^{(7–1)}

== WTA entrants ==
=== Seeds ===
| Country | Player | Rank | Seed |
|---|---|---|---|
| SUI | Martina Hingis | 1 | 1 |
| USA | Lindsay Davenport | 2 | 2 |
| USA | Monica Seles | 3 | 3 |
| CZE | Jana Novotná | 4 | 4 |
| ESP | Arantxa Sánchez Vicario | 5 | 5 |
| USA | Venus Williams | 6 | 6 |
| GER | Steffi Graf | 7 | 7 |
| FRA | Mary Pierce | 8 | 8 |
| RSA | Amanda Coetzer | 9 | 9 |
| FRA | Nathalie Tauziat | 10 | 10 |
| FRA | Sandrine Testud | 11 | 11 |
| SUI | Patty Schnyder | 12 | 12 |
| RUS | Anna Kournikova | 13 | 13 |
| FRA | Amélie Mauresmo | 14 | 14 |
| ROU | Irina Spîrlea | 15 | 15 |
| USA | Serena Williams | 16 | 16 |
| BEL | Dominique Van Roost | 17 | 17 |
| ESP | Conchita Martínez | 18 | 18 |
| BLR | Natasha Zvereva | 19 | 19 |
| AUT | Barbara Schett | 20 | 20 |
| FRA | Julie Halard-Decugis | 21 | 21 |
| ITA | Silvia Farina | 22 | 22 |
| RUS | Elena Likhovtseva | 23 | 23 |
| USA | Chanda Rubin | 24 | 24 |
| ESP | Magüi Serna | 25 | 25 |
| SVK | Henrieta Nagyová | 26 | 26 |
| GER | Anke Huber | 29 | 27 |
| ESP | Virginia Ruano Pascual | 30 | 28 |
| ZIM | Cara Black | 31 | 29 |
| CRO | Iva Majoli | 32 | 30 |
| FRA | Nathalie Dechy | 33 | 31 |
| USA | Amy Frazier | 34 | 32 |

=== Other entrants ===
The following players received wildcards into the singles main draw:

- (United States) Jackie Trail
- (United States) Samantha Reeves
- (United States) Lori McNeil
- (United States) Melissa Middleton
- (Spain) Mariam Ramon Climent
- (United States) Lilia Osterloh
- (United States) Mashona Washington
- (United States) Jennifer Capriati

The following players received wildcards into the doubles main draw:

- (United States) Tara Snyder / (United States) Mashona Washington
- (United States) Jennifer Capriati / (Croatia) Iva Majoli

The following players received entry from the singles qualifying draw:

- (Italy) Adriana Serra Zanetti
- (Germany) Marlene Weingärtner
- (Slovenia) Tina Pisnik
- (Australia) Alicia Molik
- (Chinese Taipei) Janet Lee
- (United States) Meilen Tu
- (Germany) Jana Kandarr
- (Czech Republic) Sandra Kleinová

The following player received entry as a lucky loser:

- (Greece) Christína Papadáki

The following players received entry from the doubles qualifying draw:

- (Brazil) Vanessa Menga / (Germany) Elena Wagner
