= 1998 Lipton Championships – Men's doubles =

Men's doubles
- 1998 Lipton Championships

Final
- Champion: (South Africa) Ellis Ferreira (United States) Rick Leach
- Runner-up: (United States) Alex O'Brien (United States) Jonathan Stark
- Score: 6–2, 6–4

Events
Singles	men	women
Doubles	men	women
← 1997 ·	Lipton Championships	· 1999 →

Todd Woodbridge and Mark Woodforde were the three-time defending champions, but retired from their second round match this year.

Ellis Ferreira and Rick Leach won the title, defeating Alex O'Brien and Jonathan Stark 6–2, 6–4 in the final.

== Seeds ==
1. (Australia) Todd Woodbridge / (Australia) Mark Woodforde (second round, retired)
2. N/A
3. (Russia) Yevgeny Kafelnikov / (Czech Republic) Daniel Vacek (quarterfinals)
4. (India) Mahesh Bhupathi / (India) Leander Paes (second round)
5. (Sweden) Jonas Björkman / (United States) Patrick Galbraith (third round)
6. (United States) Donald Johnson / (United States) Francisco Montana (second round)
7. (South Africa) Ellis Ferreira / (United States) Rick Leach (champions)
8. (United States) Alex O'Brien / (United States) Jonathan Stark (final)
9. (Argentina) Luis Lobo / (Spain) Javier Sánchez (second round)
10. (Australia) Joshua Eagle / (Australia) Andrew Florent (second round)
11. (United Kingdom) Neil Broad / (South Africa) Piet Norval (semifinals)
12. (The Bahamas) Mark Knowles / (Canada) Daniel Nestor (semifinals)
13. (Zimbabwe) Wayne Black / (Canada) Sébastien Lareau (third round)
14. (Australia) Sandon Stolle / (Czech Republic) Cyril Suk (quarterfinals)
15. (Argentina) Lucas Arnold / (Argentina) Daniel Orsanic (quarterfinals)
16. (United States) Trevor Kronemann / (Australia) David Macpherson (third round)

== Draw ==
=== Key ===
- Q = Qualifier
- WC = Wild card
- LL = Lucky loser
- Alt = Alternate
- ITF = ITF entry
- PR = Protected ranking
- SR = Special ranking
- SE = Special exempt
- JE = Junior exempt
- JR = Junior Accelerator Programme entrant
- CO = College Accelerator Programme entrant
- NG = Next Gen Accelerator Program entrant
- w/o = Walkover
- r = Retired
- d = Defaulted

=== Finals ===
Semifinals
8	(United States) Alex O'Brien (United States) Jonathan Stark	6	6
12	(The Bahamas) Mark Knowles (Canada) Daniel Nestor	3	4
11	(United Kingdom) Neil Broad (South Africa) Piet Norval	3	4
7	(South Africa) Ellis Ferreira (United States) Rick Leach	6	6

Final
8	(United States) Alex O'Brien (United States) Jonathan Stark	2	4
7	(South Africa) Ellis Ferreira (United States) Rick Leach	6	6

=== Top half ===
==== Section 1 ====
First round
WC	(United States) J Courier (Australia) M Philippoussis	4	7	2
(South Africa) D Adams (South Africa) W Ferreira	6	6	6
WC	(Brazil) N Aerts (Brazil) A Sá	3	6	1
Q	(United States) D DiLucia (United States) M Sell	6	4	6
WC	(United Kingdom) T Henman (Croatia) G Ivanišević	6	3	7
(Sweden) P Nyborg (South Africa) B Talbot	2	6	6
(United States) B MacPhie (Australia) M Tebbutt	4	2
(United States) M Keil (United States) TJ Middleton	6	6

Second round
1	(Australia) T Woodbridge (Australia) M Woodforde	6	r
(South Africa) D Adams (South Africa) W Ferreira	7
Q	(United States) D DiLucia (United States) M Sell	2	4
16	(United States) T Kronemann (Australia) D Macpherson	6	6
9	(Argentina) L Lobo (Spain) J Sánchez	3	4
WC	(United Kingdom) T Henman (Croatia) G Ivanišević	6	6
(United States) M Keil (United States) TJ Middleton	4	6
8	(United States) A O'Brien (United States) J Stark	6	7

Third round
(South Africa) D Adams (South Africa) W Ferreira	6	6
16	(United States) T Kronemann (Australia) D Macpherson	3	4
WC	(United Kingdom) T Henman (Croatia) G Ivanišević	6	2
8	(United States) A O'Brien (United States) J Stark	7	6

Quarterfinals
(South Africa) D Adams (South Africa) W Ferreira	7	3	3
8	(United States) A O'Brien (United States) J Stark	5	6	6

==== Section 2 ====
First round
(Argentina) P Albano (Spain) À Corretja	6	1	1
(Zimbabwe) B Black (United States) J Grabb	3	6	6
(South Africa) G Stafford (Zimbabwe) K Ullyett	7	6
(Belarus) M Mirnyi (United States) J Tarango	5	4
(Spain) A Berasategui (Hungary) G Köves	1	7	2
(United States) L Jensen (United States) M Jensen	6	6	6
LL	(Argentina) M Hood (Argentina) S Prieto	7	7
(United States) K Kinnear (United States) D Wheaton	6	6

Second round
4	(India) M Bhupathi (India) L Paes	3	3
(Zimbabwe) B Black (United States) J Grabb	6	6
(South Africa) G Stafford (Zimbabwe) K Ullyett	7	4	3
14	(Australia) S Stolle (Czech Republic) C Suk	6	6	6
12	(The Bahamas) M Knowles (Canada) D Nestor	2	6	7
(United States) L Jensen (United States) M Jensen	6	2	6
LL	(Argentina) M Hood (Argentina) S Prieto	6	6	6
6	(United States) D Johnson (United States) F Montana	4	7	2

Third round
(Zimbabwe) B Black (United States) J Grabb	4	6
14	(Australia) S Stolle (Czech Republic) C Suk	6	7
12	(The Bahamas) M Knowles (Canada) D Nestor	6	6
LL	(Argentina) M Hood (Argentina) S Prieto	4	1

Quarterfinals
14	(Australia) S Stolle (Czech Republic) C Suk	1	6
12	(The Bahamas) M Knowles (Canada) D Nestor	6	7

=== Bottom half ===
==== Section 3 ====
First round
(South Africa) B Haygarth (South Africa) M Ondruska	6	3	2
(France) J-P Fleurian (France) F Santoro	1	6	6
(United Kingdom) D Sapsford (United Kingdom) C Wilkinson	6	6
(South Africa) J-L de Jager (South Africa) R Koenig	3	2
(United States) B Coupe (United States) G Van Emburgh	4	6	3
(Mexico) D Roditi (Venezuela) M Ruah	6	3	6
(Netherlands) S Groen (Germany) D Prinosil	1^{r}
(South Africa) C Haggard (South Africa) P Rosner	4

Second round
5	(Sweden) J Björkman (United States) P Galbraith	6	3	6
(France) J-P Fleurian (France) F Santoro	3	6	3
(United Kingdom) D Sapsford (United Kingdom) C Wilkinson	1	5
11	(United Kingdom) N Broad (South Africa) P Norval	6	7
13	(Zimbabwe) W Black (Canada) S Lareau	6	6
(Mexico) D Roditi (Venezuela) M Ruah	1	2
(South Africa) C Haggard (South Africa) P Rosner	2	4
3	(Russia) Y Kafelnikov (Czech Republic) D Vacek	6	6

Third round
5	(Sweden) J Björkman (United States) P Galbraith	3	5
11	(United Kingdom) N Broad (South Africa) P Norval	6	7
13	(Zimbabwe) W Black (Canada) S Lareau	4	3
3	(Russia) Y Kafelnikov (Czech Republic) D Vacek	6	6

Quarterfinals
11	(United Kingdom) N Broad (South Africa) P Norval	5	6	6
3	(Russia) Y Kafelnikov (Czech Republic) D Vacek	7	1	4

==== Section 4 ====
First round
(Australia) A Kratzmann (Russia) A Olhovskiy	4	3
(North Macedonia) A Kitinov (United States) J Salzenstein	6	6
Q	(United States) D Bowen (Finland) T Ketola	6	6
(Australia) P Kilderry (Ecuador) N Lapentti	4	4
WC	(South Africa) N Godwin (United States) G Grant	1	5
(United States) D Randall (United States) J Waite	6	7
(Czech Republic) J Novák (Czech Republic) P Vízner	7	7
(Spain) J Alonso (Spain) F Roig	5	5

Second round
7	(South Africa) E Ferreira (United States) R Leach	6	4	6
(North Macedonia) A Kitinov (United States) J Salzenstein	3	6	3
Q	(United States) D Bowen (Finland) T Ketola	3	6	6
10	(Australia) J Eagle (Australia) A Florent	6	3	2
15	(Argentina) L Arnold (Argentina) D Orsanic	6	2	6
(United States) D Randall (United States) J Waite	3	6	0
(Czech Republic) J Novák (Czech Republic) P Vízner	6	6
LL	(Netherlands) T Nijssen (Australia) P Tramacchi	4	3

Third round
7	(South Africa) E Ferreira (United States) R Leach	6	6
Q	(United States) D Bowen (Finland) T Ketola	0	1
15	(Argentina) L Arnold (Argentina) D Orsanic	6	6
(Czech Republic) J Novák (Czech Republic) P Vízner	4	2

Quarterfinals
7	(South Africa) E Ferreira (United States) R Leach	6	2	6
15	(Argentina) L Arnold (Argentina) D Orsanic	2	6	1
