= 2003 SEAT Open =

- Date: 20–26 October
- Edition: 8th
- Category: Tier III
- Draw: 30S / 16D
- Prize money: $225,000
- Surface: Hard / indoor
- Location: Kockelscheuer, Luxembourg

Champions

Singles
- (Belgium) Kim Clijsters

Doubles
- (Russia) Maria Sharapova (Thailand) Tamarine Tanasugarn
- Luxembourg Open

The 2003 SEAT Open was a women's tennis tournament played on indoor hard courts in Kockelscheuer, Luxembourg which was part of Tier III of the 2003 WTA Tour. It was the 8th edition of the tournament and was held from 20 October until 26 October 2003. First-seeded Kim Clijsters claimed the singles title, marking her third consecutive title at the event and fourth in total, and earned $35,000 first-prize money.

== Finals ==
=== Singles ===
(Belgium) Kim Clijsters defeated (United States) Chanda Rubin, 6–2, 7–5

- This was Clijsters' 8th singles title of the year and the 18th of her career.

=== Doubles ===
(Russia) Maria Sharapova / (Thailand) Tamarine Tanasugarn defeated (Ukraine) Elena Tatarkova / (Germany) Marlene Weingärtner, 6–1, 6–4
