= 1998 Lipton Championships – Women's doubles =

Women's doubles
- 1998 Lipton Championships
- 1997 Champions: (Spain) Arantxa Sánchez Vicario (Belarus) Natasha Zvereva

Final
- Champions: (Switzerland) Martina Hingis (Czech Republic) Jana Novotná
- Runners-up: (Spain) Arantxa Sánchez Vicario (Belarus) Natasha Zvereva
- Score: 6–2, 3–6, 6–3

Events
| Singles | men | women |
| Doubles | men | women |
| ← 1997 · | Lipton Championships | · 1999 → |

Arantxa Sánchez Vicario and Natasha Zvereva were the defending champions but lost in the final 6–2, 3–6, 6–3 against Martina Hingis and Jana Novotná.

== Seeds ==
Champion seeds are indicated in bold text while text in italics indicates the round in which those seeds were eliminated. All sixteen seeded teams received byes into the second round.

1. (Switzerland) **Martina Hingis** / (Czech Republic) **Jana Novotná (champions)**
2. (Spain) Arantxa Sánchez Vicario / (Belarus) Natasha Zvereva (final)
3. (France) Alexandra Fusai / (France) Nathalie Tauziat (quarterfinals)
4. (Indonesia) Yayuk Basuki / (Netherlands) Caroline Vis (second round)
5. (United States) Katrina Adams / (Netherlands) Manon Bollegraf (second round)
6. (Spain) Conchita Martínez / (Argentina) Patricia Tarabini (semifinals)
7. (Russia) Anna Kournikova / (Latvia) Larisa Neiland (quarterfinals)
8. (Croatia) Mirjana Lučić / (Czech Republic) Helena Suková (third round)
9. (Russia) Elena Likhovtseva / (Japan) Ai Sugiyama (quarterfinals)
10. (Japan) Naoko Kijimuta / (Japan) Nana Miyagi (third round)
11. (South Africa) Amanda Coetzer / (Germany) Anke Huber (third round)
12. (Belgium) Sabine Appelmans / (Netherlands) Miriam Oremans (second round)
13. n/a
14. (Australia) Catherine Barclay / (Australia) Kerry-Anne Guse (quarterfinals)
15. (United States) Chanda Rubin / (Romania) Irina Spîrlea (third round)
16. (Japan) Rika Hiraki / (Argentina) Mercedes Paz (third round)
17. (South Africa) Mariaan de Swardt / (United States) Debbie Graham (third round)

== Draw ==
=== Key ===
- Q = Qualifier
- WC = Wild card
- LL = Lucky loser
- Alt = Alternate
- SE = Special exempt
- PR = Protected ranking
- ITF = ITF entry
- JE = Junior exempt
- w/o = Walkover
- r = Retired
- d = Defaulted
- SR = Special ranking

=== Finals ===
Semifinals

Final

1
- (Switzerland) Martina Hingis
- (Czech Republic) Jana Novotná
6
6

6
- (Spain) Conchita Martínez
- (Argentina) Patricia Tarabini
3
1

1
- (Switzerland) Martina Hingis
- (Czech Republic) Jana Novotná
6
3
6

2
- (Spain) Arantxa Sánchez Vicario
- (Belarus) Natasha Zvereva
2
6
3

- (France) Julie Halard-Decugis
- (Australia) Rachel McQuillan
4
2

2
- (Spain) Arantxa Sánchez Vicario
- (Belarus) Natasha Zvereva
6
6

=== Top half ===
==== Section 1 ====
First round

Second round

Third round

Quarterfinals

1
- (Switzerland) M Hingis
- (Czech Republic) J Novotná
6
6

- (Germany) M Babel
- (Germany) W Probst
1
2

- (Spain) V Ruano Pascual
- (Argentina) P Suárez
2
2

- (Spain) V Ruano Pascual
- (Argentina) P Suárez
6
6

1
- (Switzerland) M Hingis
- (Czech Republic) J Novotná
7
6

- (Canada) S Jeyaseelan
- (Canada) R Simpson
2
7
6

16
- (Japan) R Hiraki
- (Argentina) M Paz
5
3

- (Netherlands) K Boogert
- (Italy) R Grande
6
6
1

- (Canada) S Jeyaseelan
- (Canada) R Simpson
5
6

16
- (Japan) R Hiraki
- (Argentina) M Paz
7
7

1
- (Switzerland) M Hingis
- (Czech Republic) J Novotná
6
6

9
- (Russia) E Likhovtseva
- (Japan) A Sugiyama
4
3

9
- (Russia) E Likhovtseva
- (Japan) A Sugiyama
6
6

- (Argentina) F Labat
- (South Korea) S-H Park
6
6
7

- (Argentina) F Labat
- (South Korea) S-H Park
2
3

- (United States) G Helgeson-Nielsen
- (Chinese Taipei) J Lee
7
3
6

9
- (Russia) E Likhovtseva
- (Japan) A Sugiyama
6
3
7

- (Czech Republic) R Bobková
- (Netherlands) S Noorlander
4
3

8
- (Croatia) M Lučić
- (Czech Republic) H Suková
4
6
5

- (South Korea) E-H Kim
- (Japan) M Saeki
6
6

- (South Korea) E-H Kim
- (Japan) M Saeki
6
5
1

8
- (Croatia) M Lučić
- (Czech Republic) H Suková
1
7
6

==== Section 2 ====
First round

Second round

Third round

Quarterfinals

3
- (France) A Fusai
- (France) N Tauziat
6
6

WC
- (United States) S Reeves
- (United States) K Schlukebir
6
6

WC
- (United States) S Reeves
- (United States) K Schlukebir
4
4

- (United Kingdom) J Pullin
- (United Kingdom) L Woodroffe
1
3

3
- (France) A Fusai
- (France) N Tauziat
6
6

Q
- (France) C Dhenin
- (Russia) E Kulikovskaya
3
7
6

17
- (South Africa) M de Swardt
- (United States) D Graham
4
2

- (Romania) C Cristea
- (Argentina) L Montalvo
6
5
3

Q
- (France) C Dhenin
- (Russia) E Kulikovskaya
1
5

17
- (South Africa) M de Swardt
- (United States) D Graham
6
7

3
- (France) A Fusai
- (France) N Tauziat
2
6
6

6
- (Spain) C Martínez
- (Argentina) P Tarabini
6
3
7

11
- (South Africa) A Coetzer
- (Germany) A Huber
7
3
6

- (Slovakia) K Habšudová
- (Czech Republic) E Martincová
3
6
6

- (Slovakia) K Habšudová
- (Czech Republic) E Martincová
5
6
1

- (Sweden) Å Carlsson
- (Slovakia) J Husárová
6
1
1

11
- (South Africa) A Coetzer
- (Germany) A Huber
2
2

- (Australia) A Ellwood
- (Australia) N Pratt
6
2
6

6
- (Spain) C Martínez
- (Argentina) P Tarabini
6
6

- (Ukraine) O Lugina
- (Germany) E Wagner
2
6
4

- (Australia) A Ellwood
- (Australia) N Pratt
4
6

6
- (Spain) C Martínez
- (Argentina) P Tarabini
6
7

=== Bottom half ===
==== Section 3 ====
First round

Second round

Third round

Quarterfinals

5
- (United States) K Adams
- (Netherlands) M Bollegraf
7
1
6

- (Switzerland) P Schnyder
- (Netherlands) B Schultz-McCarthy
3
6
6

- (Switzerland) P Schnyder
- (Netherlands) B Schultz-McCarthy
5
6
7

- (United States) E deLone
- (Australia) L Pleming
6
2
0

- (Switzerland) P Schnyder
- (Netherlands) B Schultz-McCarthy
3
4

- (Belgium) E Callens
- (Canada) P Hy-Boulais
6
6

14
- (Australia) C Barclay
- (Australia) K-A Guse
6
6

- (United States) S Williams
- (United States) V Williams
4
4

- (Belgium) E Callens
- (Canada) P Hy-Boulais
5
7
6

14
- (Australia) C Barclay
- (Australia) K-A Guse
7
6
7

14
- (Australia) C Barclay
- (Australia) K-A Guse
6
2
2

- (France) J Halard-Decugis
- (Australia) R McQuillan
3
6
6

15
- (United States) C Rubin
- (Romania) I Spîrlea
6
6

- (Bulgaria) S Krivencheva
- (Ukraine) E Tatarkova
3
7
3

- (Thailand) T Tanasugarn
- (Japan) Y Yoshida
4
3

- (Thailand) T Tanasugarn
- (Japan) Y Yoshida
6
6
6

15
- (United States) C Rubin
- (Romania) I Spîrlea
2
6
0

- (France) J Halard-Decugis
- (Australia) R McQuillan
6
7

- (France) J Halard-Decugis
- (Australia) R McQuillan
6
1
6

WC
- (United States) L McNeil
- (United States) M Washington
4
6

- (France) J Halard-Decugis
- (Australia) R McQuillan
7
6

4
- (Indonesia) Y Basuki
- (Netherlands) C Vis
5
2

==== Section 4 ====
First round

Second round

Third round

Quarterfinals

7
- (Russia) A Kournikova
- (Latvia) L Neiland
7
6
6

- (Australia) K Kunce
- (United States) C Morariu
6
6

- (Australia) K Kunce
- (United States) C Morariu
6
7
1

- (Poland) M Grzybowska
- (Chinese Taipei) S-T Wang
2
2

7
- (Russia) A Kournikova
- (Latvia) L Neiland
6
2
6

- (Italy) S Farina
- (Austria) B Schett
7
6

10
- (Japan) N Kijimuta
- (Japan) N Miyagi
4
6
0

- (France) A Dechaume-Balleret
- (France) S Testud
5
3

- (Italy) S Farina
- (Austria) B Schett
3
2

10
- (Japan) N Kijimuta
- (Japan) N Miyagi
6
6

7
- (Russia) A Kournikova
- (Latvia) L Neiland
2
6
3

2
- (Spain) A Sánchez Vicario
- (Belarus) N Zvereva
6
4
6

12
- (Belgium) S Appelmans
- (Netherlands) M Oremans
6
2
0

Q
- (United States) A Miller
- (United States) B Rippner
4
2

- (Germany) C Singer
- (Czech Republic) H Vildová
0
6
6

- (Germany) C Singer
- (Czech Republic) H Vildová
6
6

- (Germany) C Singer
- (Czech Republic) H Vildová
0
1

- (Italy) L Golarsa
- (Belgium) D Van Roost
6
6
6

2
- (Spain) A Sánchez Vicario
- (Belarus) N Zvereva
6
6

- (South Africa) N de Villiers
- (South Africa) L Horn
7
2
4

- (Italy) L Golarsa
- (Belgium) D Van Roost
1
2

2
- (Spain) A Sánchez Vicario
- (Belarus) N Zvereva
6
6
