= 1998 Lipton Championships =

- Date: March 16–29
- Edition: 14th
- Surface: Hard / outdoor
- Location: Key Biscayne, Florida, U.S.
- Venue: Tennis Center at Crandon Park

Champions

Men's singles
- (Chile) Marcelo Ríos

Women's singles
- (United States) Venus Williams

Men's doubles
- (South Africa) Ellis Ferreira / (United States) Rick Leach

Women's doubles
- (Switzerland) Martina Hingis / (Czech Republic) Jana Novotná
← 1997 ·	Miami Open	· 1999 →

The 1998 Lipton Championships was a tennis tournament played on outdoor hard courts. It was the 14th edition of the Miami Masters and was part of the Super 9 of the 1998 ATP Tour and of Tier I of the 1998 WTA Tour. Both the men's and the women's events took place at the Tennis Center at Crandon Park in Key Biscayne, Florida in the United States from March 16 through March 29, 1998.

== Finals ==
=== Men's singles ===
(Chile) Marcelo Ríos defeated (United States) Andre Agassi 7–5, 6–3, 6–4

- It was Ríos' 3rd title of the year and the 9th of his career. It was his 2nd Super 9 title of the year and his 3rd overall.

=== Women's singles ===
(United States) Venus Williams defeated (Russia) Anna Kournikova 2–6, 6–4, 6–1

- It was Williams' 4th title of the year and the 4th of her career. It was her 1st Tier I title of the year and her 1st overall.

=== Men's doubles ===
(South Africa) Ellis Ferreira / (United States) Rick Leach defeated (United States) Alex O'Brien / (United States) Jonathan Stark 6–2, 6–4

- It was Ferreira's 1st title of the year and the 9th of his career. It was Leach's 1st title of the year and the 35th of his career.

=== Women's doubles ===
(Switzerland) Martina Hingis / (Czech Republic) Jana Novotná defeated (Spain) Arantxa Sánchez-Vicario / (Belarus) Natasha Zvereva 6–2, 3–6, 6–3

- It was Hingis' 6th title of the year and the 31st of her career. It was Novotná's 2nd title of the year and the 95th of her career.
