= 1999 Lipton Championships – Women's singles =

Women's singles
- 1999 Lipton Championships

Final
- Champion: (United States) Venus Williams
- Runner-up: (United States) Serena Williams
- Score: 6–1, 4–6, 6–4

Details
- Draw: 96
- Seeds: 32

Events
Singles	men	women
Doubles	men	women
- Lipton Championships

Defending champion Venus Williams defeated her sister Serena Williams in the final, 6–1, 4–6, 6–4 to win the women's singles tennis title at the 1999 Miami Open. It was the pair's first meeting in a tournament final.

== Seeds ==
All seeds received a bye to the second round.

1. (Switzerland) Martina Hingis (semifinals)
2. (United States) Lindsay Davenport (quarterfinals, withdrew)
3. (United States) Monica Seles (fourth round)
4. (Czech Republic) Jana Novotná (quarterfinals)
5. (Spain) Arantxa Sánchez Vicario (second round)
6. (United States) Venus Williams (champion)
7. (Germany) Steffi Graf (semifinals)
8. (France) Mary Pierce (fourth round)
9. (South Africa) Amanda Coetzer (quarterfinals)
10. (France) Nathalie Tauziat (third round)
11. (France) Sandrine Testud (second round)
12. (Switzerland) Patty Schnyder (fourth round)
13. (Russia) Anna Kournikova (fourth round)
14. (France) Amélie Mauresmo (third round)
15. (Romania) Irina Spîrlea (second round)
16. (United States) Serena Williams (final)
17. (Belgium) Dominique Van Roost (second round)
18. (Spain) Conchita Martínez (third round)
19. (Belarus) Natasha Zvereva (fourth round)
20. (Austria) Barbara Schett (quarterfinals)
21. (France) Julie Halard-Decugis (third round)
22. (Italy) Silvia Farina (third round)
23. (Russia) Elena Likhovtseva (fourth round)
24. (United States) Chanda Rubin (third round)
25. (Spain) Magüi Serna (third round)
26. (Slovakia) Henrieta Nagyová (third round)
27. (Germany) Anke Huber (fourth round)
28. (Spain) Virginia Ruano Pascual (third round)
29. (Zimbabwe) Cara Black (second round)
30. (Croatia) Iva Majoli (second round)
31. (France) Nathalie Dechy (third round)
32. (United States) Amy Frazier (third round)

== Draw ==
Key

- Q = Qualifier
- WC = Wild card
- LL = Lucky loser
- Alt = Alternate
- ITF = ITF entry
- PR = Protected ranking
- SR = Special ranking
- SE = Special exempt
- JE = Junior exempt
- JR = Junior Accelerator Programme entrant
- CO = College Accelerator Programme entrant
- NG = Next Gen Accelerator Program entrant
- w/o = Walkover
- r = Retired
- d = Defaulted

=== Finals ===
Quarterfinals
1	(Switzerland) Martina Hingis	6	6
20	(Austria) Barbara Schett	1	1
16	(United States) Serena Williams	6	6
9	(South Africa) Amanda Coetzer	4	0
6	(United States) Venus Williams	5	6	6
4	(Czech Republic) Jana Novotná	7	2	3
7	(Germany) Steffi Graf	w/o
2	(United States) Lindsay Davenport

Semifinals
1	(Switzerland) Martina Hingis	4	6^{3}
16	(United States) Serena Williams	6	7^{7}
6	(United States) Venus Williams	6	6
7	(Germany) Steffi Graf	2	4

Final
16	(United States) Serena Williams	1	6	4
6	(United States) Venus Williams	6	4	6

=== Top half ===
==== Section 1 ====
First round
(Slovakia) K Habšudová	6	7
(Czech Republic) A Gerši	3	5
(United States) MJ Fernández	6	6
Q	(Italy) A Serra Zanetti	0	2
(Germany) E Wagner	6	3	7
(Chinese Taipei) Wang S-t	4	6	5
WC	(United States) J Trail	5	4
Q	(Germany) M Weingärtner	7	6

Second round
1	(Switzerland) M Hingis	6	6
(Slovakia) K Habšudová	1	4
(United States) MJ Fernández	3	4
32	(United States) A Frazier	6	6
24	(United States) C Rubin	6	6
(Germany) E Wagner	4	1
Q	(Germany) M Weingärtner	6	7^{7}
11	(France) S Testud	2	6^{3}

Third round
1	(Switzerland) M Hingis	6	6
32	(United States) A Frazier	1	1
24	(United States) C Rubin	6	5	4
Q	(Germany) M Weingärtner	2	7	6

Fourth round
1	(Switzerland) M Hingis	6	6
Q	(Germany) M Weingärtner	0	2

==== Section 2 ====
First round
(Puerto Rico) K Brandi	6	6
WC	(United States) S Reeves	1	2
WC	(United States) L McNeil	6^{1}	6	3
WC	(United States) M Middleton	7^{7}	2	6
(Japan) M Saeki	6	6
(Canada) J Nejedly	3	1
(Czech Republic) K Hrdličková	6	5	4
(Luxembourg) A Kremer	3	7	6

Second round
13	(Russia) A Kournikova	6^{9}	6	6
(Puerto Rico) K Brandi	7^{11}	0	2
WC	(United States) M Middleton	3	0
21	(France) J Halard-Decugis	6	6
20	(Austria) B Schett	5	7^{7}	6
(Japan) M Saeki	7	6^{0}	2
(Luxembourg) A Kremer	1	6	6
5	(Spain) A Sánchez Vicario	6	4	1

Third round
13	(Russia) A Kournikova	6	7^{7}
21	(France) J Halard-Decugis	4	6^{5}
20	(Austria) B Schett	6	6
(Luxembourg) A Kremer	4	2

Fourth round
13	(Russia) A Kournikova	1	6	1
20	(Austria) B Schett	6	1	6

==== Section 3 ====
First round
(United States) B Rippner	6	4	6
(France) A Fusai	0	6	0
(United States) C Morariu	5	0
Q	(Slovenia) T Pisnik	7	6
(Latvia) L Neiland	0	6	3
WC	(Spain) M Ramón Climent	6	4	6
(United States) J Chi	1	2
Q	(Australia) A Molik	6	6

Second round
3	(United States) M Seles	6	7
(United States) B Rippner	3	5
Q	(Slovenia) T Pisnik	2	1
18	(Spain) C Martínez	6	6
25	(Spain) M Serna	1	7	6
WC	(Spain) M Ramón Climent	6	5	4
Q	(Australia) A Molik	2	3
16	(United States) S Williams	6	6

Third round
3	(United States) M Seles	6	6
18	(Spain) C Martínez	2	1
25	(Spain) M Serna	1	0
16	(United States) S Williams	6	6

Fourth round
3	(United States) M Seles	2	3
16	(United States) S Williams	6	6

==== Section 4 ====
First round
(Ukraine) E Tatarkova	6	6
(United States) S Cacic	3	1
(Thailand) T Tanasugarn	3	5
(Canada) M Drake	6	7
(Spain) M Sánchez Lorenzo	5	3
(Italy) R Grande	7	6
WC	(United States) L Osterloh	6	6
WC	(United States) M Washington	3	2

Second round
9	(South Africa) A Coetzer	6	7
(Ukraine) E Tatarkova	2	5
(Canada) M Drake	6	6
29	(Zimbabwe) C Black	1	3
28	(Spain) V Ruano Pascual	6	6
(Italy) R Grande	4	2
WC	(United States) L Osterloh	1	1
8	(France) M Pierce	6	6

Third round
9	(South Africa) A Coetzer	6	6
(Canada) M Drake	4	4
28	(Spain) V Ruano Pascual	1	1
8	(France) M Pierce	6	6

Fourth round
9	(South Africa) A Coetzer	6	4
8	(France) M Pierce	1	2^{r}

=== Bottom half ===
==== Section 5 ====
First round
(United States) K Po	1	3
(United States) T Snyder	6	6
Q	(Chinese Taipei) J Lee	3	3
(Colombia) F Zuluaga	6	6
(Argentina) P Suárez	4	3
(Russia) T Panova	6	6
(Venezuela) M Vento	2	1
(Romania) R Dragomir	6	6

Second round
6	(United States) V Williams	6	6
(United States) T Snyder	3	4
(Colombia) F Zuluaga	7	7
30	(Croatia) I Majoli	5	5
27	(Germany) A Huber	4	6	6
(Russia) T Panova	6	1	1
(Romania) R Dragomir	6	6
15	(Romania) I Spîrlea	0	4

Third round
6	(United States) V Williams	6	6
(Colombia) F Zuluaga	3	4
27	(Germany) A Huber	6	7^{7}
(Romania) R Dragomir	4	6^{1}

Fourth round
6	(United States) V Williams	6	5	7^{7}
27	(Germany) A Huber	3	7	6^{4}

==== Section 6 ====
First round
(South Africa) M de Swardt	6	6
(Belarus) O Barabanschikova	2	3
(Croatia) M Lučić	3	6	6
Q	(United States) M Tu	6	1	4
(Australia) N Pratt	6^{1}	2
(United States) M Shaughnessy	7^{7}	6
(Israel) A Smashnova	2	7^{7}	6
Q	(Germany) J Kandarr	6	6^{2}	4

Second round
12	(Switzerland) P Schnyder	6	6
(South Africa) M de Swardt	3	3
(Croatia) M Lučić	6	6
17	(Belgium) D Van Roost	4	3
31	(France) N Dechy	7^{9}	3	6
(United States) M Shaughnessy	6^{7}	6	2
(Israel) A Smashnova	0	1
4	(Czech Republic) J Novotná	6	6

Third round
12	(Switzerland) P Schnyder	6	6
(Croatia) M Lučić	3	4
31	(France) N Dechy	7	2	3
4	(Czech Republic) J Novotná	5	6	6

Fourth round
12	(Switzerland) P Schnyder	3	6	2
4	(Czech Republic) J Novotná	6	2	6

==== Section 7 ====
First round
WC	(United States) J Capriati	6	6
(Croatia) S Talaja	4	3
(Austria) S Plischke	6	6
Q	(Czech Republic) S Kleinová	1	2
(Germany) A Glass	4	6	6
(United Kingdom) S Smith	6	4	4
(Germany) B Rittner	6	2	6
LL	(Greece) C Papadáki	2	6	1

Second round
7	(Germany) S Graf	6	6
WC	(United States) J Capriati	0	1
(Austria) S Plischke	6	3	6^{2}
26	(Slovakia) H Nagyová	4	6	7^{7}
19	(Belarus) N Zvereva	6	3	6
(Germany) A Glass	4	6	0
(Germany) B Rittner	2	0^{r}
10	(France) N Tauziat	6	0

Third round
7	(Germany) S Graf	6	6
26	(Slovakia) H Nagyová	1	3
19	(Belarus) N Zvereva	6	6
10	(France) N Tauziat	3	2

Fourth round
7	(Germany) S Graf	6	6
19	(Belarus) N Zvereva	2	4

==== Section 8 ====
First round
(China) Li F	7^{7}	6
(France) A Dechaume-Balleret	6^{4}	3
(Romania) C Cristea	3	6	6
(Spain) G León García	6	3	1
(France) A-G Sidot	6	3	5
(Netherlands) M Oremans	3	6	7
(Belgium) S Appelmans	6	6
(Belgium) E Callens	3	4

Second round
14	(France) A Mauresmo	6	3
(China) Li F	2	0^{r}
(Romania) C Cristea	2	4
23	(Russia) E Likhovtseva	6	6
22	(Italy) S Farina	6	6
(Netherlands) M Oremans	0	3
(Belgium) S Appelmans	0	3
2	(United States) L Davenport	6	6

Third round
14	(France) A Mauresmo	6	6^{5}	1
23	(Russia) E Likhovtseva	4	7^{7}	6
22	(Italy) S Farina	4	5
2	(United States) L Davenport	6	7

Fourth round
23	(Russia) E Likhovtseva	2	0
2	(United States) L Davenport	6	6

== Qualifying ==
=== Seeds ===
1. (Sweden) Åsa Carlsson (first round)
2. (Greece) Christína Papadáki (qualifying competition, lucky loser)
3. (Netherlands) Seda Noorlander (first round)
4. (Netherlands) Amanda Hopmans (first round)
5. (Netherlands) Kristie Boogert (first round)
6. (Switzerland) Emmanuelle Gagliardi (first round)
7. (Argentina) Mariana Díaz Oliva (first round)
8. (Bulgaria) Pavlina Stoyanova (first round)
9. (Italy) Adriana Serra Zanetti (qualifier)
10. (Chinese Taipei) Janet Lee (qualifier)
11. (Germany) Marlene Weingärtner (qualifier)
12. (Australia) Alicia Molik (qualifier)
13. (Czech Republic) Sandra Kleinová (qualifier)
14. (United States) Jolene Watanabe (qualifying competition)
15. (Italy) Tathiana Garbin (qualifying competition)
16. (United States) Alexandra Stevenson (first round)

=== Qualifiers ===
1. (Italy) Adriana Serra Zanetti
2. (Germany) Marlene Weingärtner
3. (Czech Republic) Sandra Kleinová
4. (Germany) Jana Kandarr
5. (Australia) Alicia Molik
6. (United States) Meilen Tu
7. (Chinese Taipei) Janet Lee
8. (Slovenia) Tina Pisnik

=== Lucky losers ===
1. (Greece) Christína Papadáki

== Qualifying draw ==
Key

- Q = Qualifier
- WC = Wild card
- LL = Lucky loser
- Alt = Alternate
- ITF = ITF entry
- PR = Protected ranking
- SR = Special ranking
- SE = Special exempt
- JE = Junior exempt
- JR = Junior Accelerator Programme entrant
- CO = College Accelerator Programme entrant
- NG = Next Gen Accelerator Program entrant
- w/o = Walkover
- r = Retired
- d = Defaulted

=== First qualifier ===
First round
1	(Sweden) Åsa Carlsson	4	2
(Australia) Annabel Ellwood	6	6
(United Kingdom) Karen Cross	3	1
(South Africa) Liezel Horn	6	6
WC	(United States) Ansley Cargill	6^{4}	3
(United States) Jill Craybas	7^{7}	6
WC	(United States) Jennifer Hopkins	0	3
9	(Italy) Adriana Serra Zanetti	6	6

Second round
(Australia) Annabel Ellwood	2	6	4
(South Africa) Liezel Horn	6	1	6
(United States) Jill Craybas	5	2
9	(Italy) Adriana Serra Zanetti	7	6

Qualifying competition
(South Africa) Liezel Horn	7	2	3
9	(Italy) Adriana Serra Zanetti	5	6	6

=== Second qualifier ===
First round
11	(Germany) Marlene Weingärtner	6	6
(Kazakhstan) Irina Selyutina	3	1
WC	(Russia) Elena Bovina	6	6
(France) Laurence Andretto	3	2
(Germany) Petra Begerow	7^{7}	6
(Italy) Maria Paola Zavagli	6^{5}	1
(Canada) Sonya Jeyaseelan	6	6
7	(Argentina) Mariana Díaz Oliva	4	4

Second round
11	(Germany) Marlene Weingärtner	7^{7}	6
WC	(Russia) Elena Bovina	6^{0}	4
(Germany) Petra Begerow	6	7
(Canada) Sonya Jeyaseelan	0	5

Qualifying competition
11	(Germany) Marlene Weingärtner	6	6
(Germany) Petra Begerow	3	0

=== Third qualifier ===
First round
3	(Netherlands) Seda Noorlander	2	4
WC	(Canada) Renata Kolbovic	6	6
(France) Lea Ghirardi	2	3
(Slovenia) Tina Križan	6	6
(United States) Tracy Singian	6	3
(Austria) Patricia Wartusch	4	0^{r}
(Belgium) Laurence Courtois	3	0
13	(Czech Republic) Sandra Kleinová	6	6

Second round
WC	(Canada) Renata Kolbovic	1	2
(Slovenia) Tina Križan	6	6
(United States) Tracy Singian	4	2
13	(Czech Republic) Sandra Kleinová	6	6

Qualifying competition
(Slovenia) Tina Križan	6^{5}	3
13	(Czech Republic) Sandra Kleinová	7^{7}	6

=== Fourth qualifier ===
First round
15	(Italy) Tathiana Garbin	6	6
WC	(United States) Katie Schlukebir	4	2
(Russia) Eugenia Kulikovskaya	6	4	6
(Brazil) Vanessa Menga	4	6	4
(Germany) Jana Kandarr	6	6^{2}	7
(Germany) Julia Abe	1	7^{7}	5
(Slovenia) Barbara Mulej	6	6
5	(Netherlands) Kristie Boogert	1	4

Second round
15	(Italy) Tathiana Garbin	6	6
(Russia) Eugenia Kulikovskaya	4	2
(Germany) Jana Kandarr	6	6
(Slovenia) Barbara Mulej	4	2

Qualifying competition
15	(Italy) Tathiana Garbin	4	1
(Germany) Jana Kandarr	6	6

=== Fifth qualifier ===
First round
8	(Bulgaria) Pavlina Stoyanova	2	1
(Hungary) Anna-Maria Foldenyi	6	6
(Federal Republic of Yugoslavia) Sandra Naćuk	5	6	6
(United Kingdom) Louise Latimer	7	1	2
(South Africa) Surina De Beer	4	4
(Italy) Francesca Lubiani	6	6
(United States) Erika deLone	6	4	4
12	(Australia) Alicia Molik	4	6	6

Second round
(Hungary) Anna-Maria Foldenyi	5	3
(Federal Republic of Yugoslavia) Sandra Naćuk	7	6
(Italy) Francesca Lubiani	3	6	4
12	(Australia) Alicia Molik	6	2	6

Qualifying competition
(Federal Republic of Yugoslavia) Sandra Naćuk	6^{5}	5
12	(Australia) Alicia Molik	7^{7}	7

=== Sixth qualifier ===
First round
14	(United States) Jolene Watanabe	6	6
(United Kingdom) Joanne Ward	1	3
(Russia) Alina Jidkova	6	6
(United States) Karin Miller	3	1
(Russia) Elena Makarova	3	0^{r}
(Poland) Aleksandra Olsza	6	0
(United States) Meilen Tu	7	6
4	(Netherlands) Amanda Hopmans	5	3

Second round
14	(United States) Jolene Watanabe	6	6
(Russia) Alina Jidkova	2	2
(Poland) Aleksandra Olsza	3	1
(United States) Meilen Tu	6	6

Qualifying competition
14	(United States) Jolene Watanabe	4	2
(United States) Meilen Tu	6	6

=== Seventh qualifier ===
First round
6	(Switzerland) Emmanuelle Gagliardi	2	6	1
(Russia) Nadia Petrova	6	4	6
(Japan) Nana Miyagi	6	6
(Austria) Barbara Schwartz	1	4
WC	(South Africa) Jessica Steck	6	6
(Slovakia) Radka Zrubáková	3	0
(Austria) Marion Maruska	0	3
10	(Chinese Taipei) Janet Lee	6	6

Second round
(Russia) Nadia Petrova	6	6
(Japan) Nana Miyagi	4	1
WC	(South Africa) Jessica Steck	2	3
10	(Chinese Taipei) Janet Lee	6	6

Qualifying competition
(Russia) Nadia Petrova	7^{10}	6^{5}	2
10	(Chinese Taipei) Janet Lee	6^{8}	7^{7}	6

=== Eighth qualifier ===
First round
16	(United States) Alexandra Stevenson	6	6^{4}	5
(Russia) Elena Dementieva	3	7^{7}	7
WC	(Slovenia) Tina Pisnik	6	6
(Paraguay) Larissa Schaerer	4	1
(Czech Republic) Lenka Němečková	6	6
(Australia) Catherine Barclay	3	4
(United Kingdom) Julie Pullin	3	2
2	(Greece) Christína Papadáki	6	6

Second round
(Russia) Elena Dementieva	4	5
WC	(Slovenia) Tina Pisnik	6	7
(Czech Republic) Lenka Němečková	3	7^{7}	4
2	(Greece) Christína Papadáki	6	6^{2}	6

Qualifying competition
WC	(Slovenia) Tina Pisnik	6	6
2	(Greece) Christína Papadáki	3	3
