= 1999 Lipton Championships – Men's singles =

Men's singles
- 1999 Lipton Championships

Final
- Champion: (Netherlands) Richard Krajicek
- Runner-up: (France) Sébastien Grosjean
- Score: 4–6, 6–1, 6–2, 7–5

Details
- Draw: 96 (12Q / 6WC)
- Seeds: 32

Events
Singles	men	women
Doubles	men	women
← 1998 ·	Lipton Championships	· 2000 →

Richard Krajicek defeated Sébastien Grosjean in the final, 4–6, 6–1, 6–2, 7–5 to win the men's singles tennis title at the 1999 Miami Open.

Marcelo Ríos was the defending champion, but lost in the fourth round to Dominik Hrbatý.

== Seeds ==
All thirty-two seeds received a bye to the second round.

1. (Spain) Carlos Moyà (fourth round)
2. (United States) Pete Sampras (quarterfinals)
3. (Russia) Yevgeny Kafelnikov (second round)
4. (Spain) Álex Corretja (fourth round)
5. (Australia) Patrick Rafter (third round)
6. (United Kingdom) Tim Henman (third round)
7. (Netherlands) Richard Krajicek (champion)
8. (Chile) Marcelo Ríos (fourth round)
9. (United States) Andre Agassi (second round)
10. (Australia) Mark Philippoussis (third round)
11. (Slovakia) Karol Kučera (fourth round)
12. (United Kingdom) Greg Rusedski (fourth round)
13. (Croatia) Goran Ivanišević (second round)
14. (Sweden) Thomas Enqvist (semifinals)
15. (Spain) Álbert Costa (fourth round)
16. (Brazil) Gustavo Kuerten (second round)
17. (Sweden) Thomas Johansson (second round)
18. (Germany) Tommy Haas (second round)
19. (Spain) Félix Mantilla (third round)
20. (Spain) Francisco Clavet (semifinals)
21. (South Africa) Wayne Ferreira (second round)
22. (Switzerland) Marc Rosset (second round)
23. (Russia) Marat Safin (fourth round)
24. (Spain) Alberto Berasategui (second round, retired)
25. (Zimbabwe) Byron Black (third round)
26. (Netherlands) Jan Siemerink (third round)
27. (Germany) Nicolas Kiefer (quarterfinals)
28. (France) Jérôme Golmard (quarterfinals)
29. (France) Fabrice Santoro (third round)
30. (Czech Republic) Bohdan Ulihrach (second round)
31. (Sweden) Jonas Björkman (third round)
32. (Australia) Jason Stoltenberg (third round)

== Draw ==
=== Key ===
- Q = Qualifier
- WC = Wild card
- LL = Lucky loser
- Alt = Alternate
- SE = Special exempt
- PR = Protected ranking
- ITF = ITF entry
- JE = Junior exempt
- w/o = Walkover
- r = Retired
- d = Defaulted
- SR = Special ranking

=== Finals ===
Quarterfinals
(France) Sébastien Grosjean	6	5	6
(Slovakia) Dominik Hrbatý	3	7	1
20	(Spain) Francisco Clavet	7	6
27	(Germany) Nicolas Kiefer	5	3
28	(France) Jérôme Golmard	3	5
14	(Sweden) Thomas Enqvist	6	7
7	(Netherlands) Richard Krajicek	6	7^{8}
2	(United States) Pete Sampras	2	6^{6}

Semifinals
(France) Sébastien Grosjean	3	6	6
20	(Spain) Francisco Clavet	6	3	1
14	(Sweden) Thomas Enqvist	4	2
7	(Netherlands) Richard Krajicek	6	6

Final
(France) Sébastien Grosjean	6	1	2	5
7	(Netherlands) Richard Krajicek	4	6	6	7

=== Top half ===
==== Section 1 ====
First round
(Italy) D Sanguinetti	6	6
(France) G Raoux	2	2
(Germany) D Prinosil	6	6^{7}	4
(Zimbabwe) W Black	1	7^{9}	6
Q	(Haiti) R Agénor	4	4
(Slovakia) J Krošlák	6	6
(France) S Grosjean	6	7
(Italy) L Tieleman	1	5

Second round
1	(Spain) C Moyà	6	4	6
(Italy) D Sanguinetti	3	6	1
(Zimbabwe) W Black	4	6	6^{2}
32	(Australia) J Stoltenberg	6	1	7^{7}
17	(Sweden) T Johansson	6^{6}	6	3
(Slovakia) J Krošlák	7^{8}	2	6
(France) S Grosjean	6	7^{7}
16	(Brazil) G Kuerten	3	6^{4}

Third round
1	(Spain) C Moyà	6^{5}	6	7
32	(Australia) J Stoltenberg	7^{7}	1	5
(Slovakia) J Krošlák	2	4
(France) S Grosjean	6	6

Fourth round
1	(Spain) C Moyà	6	4	6^{9}
(France) S Grosjean	3	6	7^{11}

==== Section 2 ====
First round
(Slovakia) D Hrbatý	6^{5}	6	6
(Morocco) Y El Aynaoui	7^{7}	3	0
(Costa Rica) J A Marín	7^{7}	7^{9}
(United States) M Chang	6^{3}	6^{7}
Q	(United States) S Campbell	5	6	3
Q	(France) N Escudé	7	4	6
(Argentina) M Puerta	3	6	2
(Australia) S Draper	6	2	6

Second round
9	(United States) A Agassi	6	3	2
(Slovakia) D Hrbatý	1	6	6
(Costa Rica) J A Marín	2
24	(Spain) A Berasategui	1^{r}
25	(Zimbabwe) B Black	6	6
Q	(France) N Escudé	4	3
(Australia) S Draper	6^{6}	3
8	(Chile) M Ríos	7^{8}	6

Third round
(Slovakia) D Hrbatý	6	6
(Costa Rica) J A Marín	2	4
25	(Zimbabwe) B Black	3	4
8	(Chile) M Ríos	6	6

Fourth round
(Slovakia) D Hrbatý	6	6
8	(Chile) M Ríos	2	0

==== Section 3 ====
First round
(United States) V Spadea	6	6
(Argentina) F Squillari	3	2
Q	(Belgium) X Malisse	5	2
(United States) J-M Gambill	7	6
(Norway) C Ruud	6	7^{8}
(Czech Republic) P Korda	2	6^{6}
WC	(Switzerland) R Federer	5	6^{4}
(Denmark) K Carlsen	7	7^{7}

Second round
3	(Russia) Y Kafelnikov	7^{8}	6^{4}	2
(United States) V Spadea	6^{6}	7^{7}	6
(United States) J-M Gambill	5	2
29	(France) F Santoro	7	6
20	(Spain) F Clavet	7	1
(Norway) C Ruud	5	0^{r}
(Denmark) K Carlsen	6	3	6
13	(Croatia) G Ivanišević	2	6	4

Third round
(United States) V Spadea	6	6
29	(France) F Santoro	3	2
20	(Spain) F Clavet	6	6
(Denmark) K Carlsen	2	4

Fourth round
(United States) V Spadea	5	6	4
20	(Spain) F Clavet	7	4	6

==== Section 4 ====
First round
(Romania) A Voinea	6	6
Q	(United States) D Caldwell	0	3
(Germany) H Dreekmann	6	7
Q	(United States) R Reneberg	3	5
Q	(France) A Clément	6^{4}	6	6
Q	(Netherlands) J van Lottum	7^{7}	4	4
(Australia) A Ilie	6	6
(Spain) G Blanco	3	4

Second round
12	(United Kingdom) G Rusedski	6	6
(Romania) A Voinea	4	4
(Germany) H Dreekmann	6	6
21	(South Africa) W Ferreira	4	4
27	(Germany) N Kiefer	6	6
Q	(France) A Clément	1	2
(Australia) A Ilie	3	5
5	(Australia) P Rafter	6	7

Third round
12	(United Kingdom) G Rusedski	6	6
(Germany) H Dreekmann	3	4
27	(Germany) N Kiefer	7^{7}	6
5	(Australia) P Rafter	6^{5}	4

Fourth round
12	(United Kingdom) G Rusedski	6	5	2
27	(Germany) N Kiefer	4	7	6

=== Bottom half ===
==== Section 5 ====
First round
WC	(Philippines) C Mamiit	4	6	7
WC	(United States) P Goldstein	6	2	5
(Sweden) M Norman	6	6
(Morocco) H Arazi	1	1
(Romania) A Pavel	6	6
WC	(United States) C Woodruff	3	3
(United States) J Tarango	4	5
(Netherlands) P Haarhuis	6	7

Second round
6	(United Kingdom) T Henman	3	6	6
WC	(Philippines) C Mamiit	6	3	2
(Sweden) M Norman	4	3
28	(France) J Golmard	6	6
22	(Switzerland) M Rosset	4	6	6^{6}
(Romania) A Pavel	6	4	7^{8}
(Netherlands) P Haarhuis	0	2
11	(Slovakia) K Kučera	6	6

Third round
6	(United Kingdom) T Henman	4	6^{7}
28	(France) J Golmard	6	7^{9}
(Romania) A Pavel	3	5
11	(Slovakia) K Kučera	6	7

Fourth round
28	(France) J Golmard	4	6	6
11	(Slovakia) K Kučera	6	2	2

==== Section 6 ====
First round
(Armenia) S Sargsian	1	1
WC	(United States) B Bryan	6	6
(Czech Republic) D Vacek	6	6
(Argentina) M Zabaleta	4	4
(Paraguay) R Delgado	7^{7}	6
(Germany) R Schüttler	6^{5}	1
(Czech Republic) M Damm	7^{7}	6
Q	(Australia) T Woodbridge	6^{3}	4

Second round
14	(Sweden) T Enqvist	6	6
WC	(United States) B Bryan	4	4
(Czech Republic) D Vacek	2	0
19	(Spain) F Mantilla	6	6
30	(Czech Republic) B Ulihrach	6	1	2
(Paraguay) R Delgado	2	6	6
(Czech Republic) M Damm	2	2
4	(Spain) Á Corretja	6	6

Third round
14	(Sweden) T Enqvist	4	6	7^{7}
19	(Spain) F Mantilla	6	3	6^{3}
(Paraguay) R Delgado	4	6	4
4	(Spain) Á Corretja	6	1	6

Fourth round
14	(Sweden) T Enqvist	7	6
4	(Spain) Á Corretja	5	3

==== Section 7 ====
First round
(Czech Republic) J Novák	2	1
(Netherlands) S Schalken	6	6
Q	(Canada) S Lareau	5	6^{7}
Q	(United States) A O'Brien	7	7^{9}
(Germany) B Becker	6	1	6
(Italy) G Pozzi	4	6	4
(Australia) M Woodforde	2	1
WC	(Australia) L Hewitt	6	6

Second round
7	(Netherlands) R Krajicek	6	4	6
(Netherlands) S Schalken	1	6	1
Q	(United States) A O'Brien	5	5
26	(Netherlands) J Siemerink	7	7
23	(Russia) M Safin	7	6
(Germany) B Becker	5	0
WC	(Australia) L Hewitt	3	4
10	(Australia) M Philippoussis	6	6

Third round
7	(Netherlands) R Krajicek	6	6
26	(Netherlands) J Siemerink	3	2
23	(Russia) M Safin	7^{7}	7^{7}
10	(Australia) M Philippoussis	6^{4}	6^{3}

Fourth round
7	(Netherlands) R Krajicek	6	6
23	(Russia) M Safin	3	1

==== Section 8 ====
First round
(France) A Di Pasquale	2	2
(Czech Republic) S Doseděl	6	6
(Ecuador) N Lapentti	6	6
(Sweden) M Tillström	0	2
(Ukraine) A Medvedev	6	6
(United States) J Gimelstob	1	0
Q	(Norway) J F Andersen	6^{6}	2
(United States) J Courier	7^{8}	6

Second round
15	(Spain) Á Costa	2	6	6
(Czech Republic) S Doseděl	6	3	4
(Ecuador) N Lapentti	5	7^{7}	6
18	(Germany) T Haas	7	6^{3}	2
31	(Sweden) J Björkman	1	6	6
(Ukraine) A Medvedev	6	1	2
(United States) J Courier	3	6^{3}
2	(United States) P Sampras	6	7^{7}

Third round
15	(Spain) Á Costa	7^{7}	6
(Ecuador) N Lapentti	6^{3}	4
31	(Sweden) J Björkman	5	3
2	(United States) P Sampras	7	6

Fourth round
15	(Spain) Á Costa	4	4
2	(United States) P Sampras	6	6
