= 1999 Lipton Championships – Men's doubles =

Men's doubles
- 1999 Lipton Championships

Final
- Champion: (Zimbabwe) Wayne Black (Australia) Sandon Stolle
- Runner-up: (Germany) Boris Becker (United States) Jan-Michael Gambill
- Score: 6–1, 6–1

Events
Singles	men	women
Doubles	men	women
← 1998 ·	Lipton Championships	· 2000 →

Ellis Ferreira and Rick Leach were the defending champions, but lost in the third round this year.

Wayne Black and Sandon Stolle won the title, defeating Boris Becker and Jan-Michael Gambill 6–1, 6–1 in the final.

== Seeds ==
1. (India) Mahesh Bhupathi / (India) Leander Paes (second round)
2. (Australia) Todd Woodbridge / (Australia) Mark Woodforde (third round)
3. (The Bahamas) Mark Knowles / (Canada) Daniel Nestor (second round)
4. (South Africa) Ellis Ferreira / (United States) Rick Leach (third round)
5. (Canada) Sébastien Lareau / (United States) Alex O'Brien (second round)
6. (United States) Patrick Galbraith / (Netherlands) Paul Haarhuis (second round)
7. (Zimbabwe) Wayne Black / (Australia) Sandon Stolle (champions)
8. (France) Olivier Delaître / (France) Fabrice Santoro (second round)
9. (South Africa) David Adams / (South Africa) John-Laffnie de Jager (second round)
10. (Sweden) Jonas Björkman / (Australia) Joshua Eagle (second round)
11. (Russia) Yevgeny Kafelnikov / (Czech Republic) Daniel Vacek (second round)
12. (South Africa) Piet Norval / (Zimbabwe) Kevin Ullyett (second round)
13. (Czech Republic) Martin Damm / (Czech Republic) Cyril Suk (quarterfinals)
14. (Czech Republic) Jiří Novák / (Czech Republic) David Rikl (second round)
15. (United States) Jim Grabb / (United States) Jared Palmer (second round)
16. (Australia) Andrew Florent / (Australia) David Macpherson (quarterfinals)

== Draw ==
=== Key ===
- Q = Qualifier
- WC = Wild card
- LL = Lucky loser
- Alt = Alternate
- ITF = ITF entry
- PR = Protected ranking
- SR = Special ranking
- SE = Special exempt
- JE = Junior exempt
- JR = Junior Accelerator Programme entrant
- CO = College Accelerator Programme entrant
- NG = Next Gen Accelerator Program entrant
- w/o = Walkover
- r = Retired
- d = Defaulted

=== Finals ===
Semifinals
WC	(Germany) Boris Becker (United States) Jan-Michael Gambill	6	6
(South Africa) Lan Bale (South Africa) Grant Stafford	4	4
(Sweden) Nicklas Kulti (Sweden) Mikael Tillström	7	6	3
7	(Zimbabwe) Wayne Black (Australia) Sandon Stolle	6	7	6

Final
WC	(Germany) Boris Becker (United States) Jan-Michael Gambill	1	1
7	(Zimbabwe) Wayne Black (Australia) Sandon Stolle	6	6

=== Top half ===
==== Section 1 ====
First round
WC	(Netherlands) T Kempers (Netherlands) J Siemerink	7	3	2
(United States) B Coupe (The Bahamas) M Merklein	5	6	6
(United States) J Gimelstob (United States) B MacPhie	6	1
WC	(Germany) B Becker (United States) J-M Gambill	7	6
Q	(United States) P Goldstein (United States) S Humphries	3	6	5
(South Africa) M Barnard (South Africa) B Haygarth	6	3	7
WC	(United States) B Bryan (United States) M Bryan	7	6
(Argentina) D del Río (Argentina) M Puerta	5	3

Second round
1	(India) M Bhupathi (India) L Paes	3	r
(United States) B Coupe (The Bahamas) M Merklein	6
WC	(Germany) B Becker (United States) J-M Gambill	3	6	6
15	(United States) J Grabb (United States) J Palmer	6	3	3
10	(Sweden) J Björkman (Australia) J Eagle	3	5
(South Africa) M Barnard (South Africa) B Haygarth	6	7
WC	(United States) B Bryan (United States) M Bryan	6	6	7
8	(France) O Delaître (France) F Santoro	7	2	6

Third round
(United States) B Coupe (The Bahamas) M Merklein	3	3
WC	(Germany) B Becker (United States) J-M Gambill	6	6
(South Africa) M Barnard (South Africa) B Haygarth	2	7	4
WC	(United States) B Bryan (United States) M Bryan	6	6	6

Quarterfinals
WC	(Germany) B Becker (United States) J-M Gambill	6	7
WC	(United States) B Bryan (United States) M Bryan	4	6

==== Section 2 ====
First round
(Spain) T Carbonell (United States) D Johnson	2	6	6
(North Macedonia) A Kitinov (Socialist Federal Republic of Yugoslavia) N Zimonjić	6	3	4
(Germany) N Kiefer (Germany) D Prinosil	6	3	2
(Brazil) G Kuerten (Ecuador) N Lapentti	2	6	6
(Argentina) P Albano (United States) F Montana	6	7
(Argentina) M Hood (Argentina) S Prieto	3	6
(South Africa) L Bale (South Africa) G Stafford	4	6	6
(Croatia) G Ivanišević (Hungary) G Köves	6	2	4

Second round
4	(South Africa) E Ferreira (United States) R Leach	5	7	6
(Spain) T Carbonell (United States) D Johnson	7	6	4
(Brazil) G Kuerten (Ecuador) N Lapentti	7	1	6
14	(Czech Republic) J Novák (Czech Republic) D Rikl	5	6	3
11	(Russia) Y Kafelnikov (Czech Republic) D Vacek	2	5
(Argentina) P Albano (United States) F Montana	6	7
(South Africa) L Bale (South Africa) G Stafford	6	7
6	(United States) P Galbraith (Netherlands) P Haarhuis	4	6

Third round
4	(South Africa) E Ferreira (United States) R Leach	4	4
(Brazil) G Kuerten (Ecuador) N Lapentti	6	6
(Argentina) P Albano (United States) F Montana	2	0
(South Africa) L Bale (South Africa) G Stafford	6	6

Quarterfinals
(Brazil) G Kuerten (Ecuador) N Lapentti	6	3	2
(South Africa) L Bale (South Africa) G Stafford	3	6	6

=== Bottom half ===
==== Section 3 ====
First round
(Sweden) N Kulti (Sweden) M Tillström	6	6	6
(Mexico) D Roditi (Australia) M Tebbutt	4	7	3
WC	(Spain) C Moyá (Russia) M Safin	7	7
(United Kingdom) N Broad (South Africa) R Koenig	6	6
(Zimbabwe) B Black (South Africa) W Ferreira	4	6	6
(South Africa) C Haggard (Sweden) P Nyborg	6	3	7
(Australia) P Kilderry (Czech Republic) P Vízner	1	3
(United States) R Reneberg (United States) J Stark	6	6

Second round
5	(Canada) S Lareau (United States) A O'Brien	4	6
(Sweden) N Kulti (Sweden) M Tillström	6	7
WC	(Spain) C Moyá (Russia) M Safin	6	6
12	(South Africa) P Norval (South Africa) K Ullyett	4	4
13	(Czech Republic) M Damm (Czech Republic) C Suk	6	7
(South Africa) C Haggard (Sweden) P Nyborg	4	6
(United States) R Reneberg (United States) J Stark	2	6	6
3	(The Bahamas) M Knowles (Canada) D Nestor	6	1	4

Third round
(Sweden) N Kulti (Sweden) M Tillström	6	6
WC	(Spain) C Moyá (Russia) M Safin	4	4
13	(Czech Republic) M Damm (Czech Republic) C Suk	4	7	6
(United States) R Reneberg (United States) J Stark	6	6	2

Quarterfinals
(Sweden) N Kulti (Sweden) M Tillström	6	6
13	(Czech Republic) M Damm (Czech Republic) C Suk	4	4

==== Section 4 ====
First round
(Argentina) D Orsanic (Argentina) M Rodríguez	4	4
(Spain) F Roig (Spain) J Sánchez	6	6
WC	(Spain) À Corretja (Spain) A Costa	6	4
(United States) D Flach (United States) J Tarango	7	6
(Finland) T Ketola (South Africa) P Rosner	7	2	6
(Belarus) M Mirnyi (Russia) A Olhovskiy	6	6	7
Q	(United States) G Grant (United States) TJ Middleton	6	6
(United States) D Bowen (South Africa) N Godwin	1	4

Second round
7	(Zimbabwe) W Black (Australia) S Stolle	6	7
(Spain) F Roig (Spain) J Sánchez	1	5
(United States) D Flach (United States) J Tarango	6	6
9	(South Africa) D Adams (South Africa) J-L de Jager	4	4
16	(Australia) A Florent (Australia) D Macpherson	6	7
(Belarus) M Mirnyi (Russia) A Olhovskiy	4	6
Q	(United States) G Grant (United States) TJ Middleton	4	4
2	(Australia) T Woodbridge (Australia) M Woodforde	6	6

Third round
7	(Zimbabwe) W Black (Australia) S Stolle	6	6
(United States) D Flach (United States) J Tarango	3	4
16	(Australia) A Florent (Australia) D Macpherson	6	4	6
2	(Australia) T Woodbridge (Australia) M Woodforde	3	6	3

Quarterfinals
7	(Zimbabwe) W Black (Australia) S Stolle	6	6	6
16	(Australia) A Florent (Australia) D Macpherson	3	7	4
