= Marlene Weingärtner =

German tennis player (born 1980)

- Country (sports): Germany
- Born: 30 January 1980 (age 46) Heidelberg, West Germany
- Height: 1.74 m (5 ft 8 1/2 in)
- Turned pro: 9 May 1994
- Retired: 31 August 2005
- Plays: Right-handed (two-handed backhand)
- Prize money: $1,127,324

Singles
- Career record: 233–255
- Career titles: 0
- Highest ranking: No. 36 (4 February 2002)

Grand Slam singles results
- Australian Open: 4R (2002)
- French Open: 4R (2004)
- Wimbledon: 2R (1999–2003)
- US Open: 2R (1998)

Doubles
- Career record: 97–120
- Career titles: 1 WTA, 3 ITF
- Highest ranking: No. 34 (17 January 2005)

Grand Slam doubles results
- Australian Open: 1R (1999, 2002–03, 2005)
- French Open: QF (2004)
- Wimbledon: QF (2002)
- US Open: 2R (2001, 2004)

Marlene Weingärtner (born 30 January 1980) is a retired tennis player from Germany. She is a former top 40 player in both singles and doubles.

== Career ==
The most remarkable moment of her career was her first-round match at the 2003 Australian Open when she defeated the 2-time defending champion Jennifer Capriati. In facts, Capriati had a 19–1 record in her previous 3 Australian Opens going into the first round match against Weingärtner. Capriati led the encounter 6–2, 4–1, but Weingärtner fought back and won by a 2–6, 7–6, 6–4 scoreline. She eventually reached the third round.

Her best Grand Slam tournament showings were two fourth-round appearances, the first in Melbourne 2002, the latter at the 2004 French Open. In 2004, she also reached her only WTA Tour final in Bali which she lost in straight sets to Svetlana Kuznetsova.

Playing for Germany in the Fed Cup, she has a win–loss record of 2–3.

Weingärtner retired after the 2005 US Open, after suffering several first-round losses due to ongoing physical problems. She made a brief return in July 2008 to play the doubles event of the Gastein Ladies tournament where she partnered Sandra Klemenschits, losing in the quarterfinals to Xu Yifan and Zhang Shuai.

== WTA Tour finals ==
=== Singles: 1 (runner-up) ===
Result	Date	Tournament	Surface	Opponent	Score
Loss	Sep 2004	Bali Classic, Indonesia	Hard	(Russia) Svetlana Kuznetsova	1–6, 4–6

=== Doubles: 2 (1 title, 1 runner-up) ===
Result	Date	Tournament	Surface	Partner	Opponents	Score
Win	Aug 2004	Cincinnati Open, US	Hard	(United States) Jill Craybas	(Switzerland) Emmanuelle Gagliardi (Germany) Anna-Lena Grönefeld	7–5, 7–6^{(7–2)}
Loss	Oct 2004	Luxembourg Open	Hard (i)	(United States) Jill Craybas	(Spain) Virginia Ruano Pascual (Argentina) Paola Suárez	1–6, 7–6^{(7–1)}, 3–6

== ITF Circuit finals ==
Legend
$75,000 tournaments
$50,000 tournaments
$25,000 tournaments
$10,000 tournaments

=== Singles (0–5) ===
Result	No.	Date	Tournament	Surface	Opponent	Score
Loss	1.	22 August 1994	ITF İstanbul, Turkey	Hard	(Czech Republic) Radka Surová	6–4, 0–6, 3–6
Loss	2.	14 October 1996	ITF Flensburg, Germany	Carpet (i)	(Austria) Beate Reinstadler	6–4, 6–7^{(5–7)}, 5–7
Loss	3.	7 December 1998	ITF Bad Gögging, Germany	Carpet (i)	(Slovakia) Karina Habšudová	6–7, 2–6
Loss	4.	29 October 2000	ITF Seoul, South Korea	Hard	(Canada) Vanessa Webb	2–4, 3–5, 4–1, 3–5
Loss	5.	26 November 2000	ITF Nuriootpa, Australia	Hard	(Australia) Rachel McQuillan	4–6, 3–6

=== Doubles (3–4) ===
Result	No.	Date	Tournament	Surface	Partner	Opponents	Score
Win	1.	5 February 1995	ITF Coburg, Germany	Hard (i)	(Netherlands) Seda Noorlander	(Poland) Magdalena Feistel (Czech Republic) Helena Vildová	6–2, 6–7, 6–2
Loss	1.	7 April 1996	ITF Athens, Greece	Clay	(Serbia and Montenegro) Dragana Zarić	(Sweden) Annica Lindstedt (Sweden) Anna-Karin Svensson	0–6, 2–6
Win	2.	6 October 1996	ITF Puerto Vallarta, Mexico	Hard	(Argentina) María Fernanda Landa	(Chile) Paula Cabezas (Argentina) Veronica Stele	4–6, 7–5, 6–3
Loss	2.	23 June 1997	ITF Bordeaux, France	Clay	(Argentina) María Fernanda Landa	(France) Caroline Dhenin (Georgia (country)) Nino Louarsabishvili	7–6^{(8–6)}, 4–6, 5–7
Loss	3.	6 July 1997	ITF Stuttgart, Germany	Clay	(Argentina) María Fernanda Landa	(Netherlands) Seda Noorlander (India) Nirupama Vaidyanathan	3–6, 1–6
Loss	4.	27 July 1997	ITF İstanbul, Turkey	Hard	(Austria) Sylvia Plischke	(Italy) Laura Golarsa (Argentina) Mercedes Paz	6–3, 3–6, 3–6
Win	3.	28 October 2000	ITF Seoul, South Korea	Hard	(South Africa) Surina De Beer	(South Korea) Cho Yoon-jeong (South Korea) Jeon Mi-ra	4–2, 4–1, 1–4, 3–5, 4–2
