= 1997 ATP Super 9 =

Men's professional tennis tour

Details
- Duration: March 7 – November 3
- Edition: 8th
- Tournaments: 9

Achievements (singles)
- Most titles: (United States) Pete Sampras (2)
- Most finals: (Spain) Àlex Corretja (Austria) Thomas Muster (Chile) Marcelo Ríos (United States) Pete Sampras (2)

The 1997 ATP Super 9 (also known as Mercedes-Benz Super 9 for sponsorship reasons) were part of the 1997 ATP Tour, the elite tour for professional men's tennis organised by the Association of Tennis Professionals.

== Results ==
* First-time champion

Masters	Singles champions	Runners-up	Score	Doubles champions	Runners-up	Score
Indian Wells Singles – Doubles	(United States) Michael Chang	(Czech Republic) Bohdan Ulihrach	4–6, 6–3, 6–4, 6–3	(The Bahamas) Mark Knowles (Canada) Daniel Nestor	(Australia) Mark Philippoussis (Australia) Patrick Rafter	7–5, 6–4
Miami Singles – Doubles	(Austria) Thomas Muster	(Spain) Sergi Bruguera	7–6^{(8–6)}, 6–3, 6–1	(Australia) Todd Woodbridge (Australia) Mark Woodforde	(The Bahamas) Mark Knowles (Canada) Daniel Nestor	7–6, 7–6
Monte Carlo Singles – Doubles	(Chile) Marcelo Ríos*	(Spain) Àlex Corretja	6–4, 6–3, 6–3	(United States) Donald Johnson* (United States) Francisco Montana*	(Netherlands) Jacco Eltingh (Netherlands) Paul Haarhuis	6–4, 6–4
Hamburg Singles – Doubles	(Ukraine) Andriy Medvedev	(Spain) Félix Mantilla	6–0, 6–4, 6–2	(Argentina) Luis Lobo*	(United Kingdom) Neil Broad (South Africa) Piet Norval	6–2, 3–6, 6–4
Hamburg Singles – Doubles	(Ukraine) Andriy Medvedev	(Spain) Félix Mantilla	6–0, 6–4, 6–2	(Spain) Javier Sánchez	(United Kingdom) Neil Broad (South Africa) Piet Norval	6–2, 3–6, 6–4
Rome Singles – Doubles	(Spain) Àlex Corretja*	(Chile) Marcelo Ríos	7–5, 7–5, 6–3	(The Bahamas) Mark Knowles (Canada) Daniel Nestor	(Zimbabwe) Byron Black (United States) Alex O'Brien	6–3, 4–6, 7–5
Montreal Singles – Doubles	(United States) Chris Woodruff*	(Brazil) Gustavo Kuerten	7–5, 4–6, 6–3	(India) Mahesh Bhupathi* (India) Leander Paes*	(Canada) Sébastien Lareau (United States) Alex O'Brien	4–6, 6–3, 6–4
Cincinnati Singles – Doubles	(United States) Pete Sampras	(Austria) Thomas Muster	6–3, 6–4	(Australia) Todd Woodbridge (Australia) Mark Woodforde	(Australia) Mark Philippoussis (Australia) Patrick Rafter	6–4, 6–2
Stuttgart Singles – Doubles	(Czech Republic) Petr Korda*	(Netherlands) Richard Krajicek	7–6^{(8–6)}, 6–2, 6–4	(Australia) Todd Woodbridge (Australia) Mark Woodforde	(United States) Rick Leach (United States) Jonathan Stark	7–6, 7–6
Paris Singles – Doubles	(United States) Pete Sampras	(Sweden) Jonas Björkman	6–3, 4–6, 6–3, 6–1	(Netherlands) Jacco Eltingh (Netherlands) Paul Haarhuis	(United States) Rick Leach (United States) Jonathan Stark	6–2, 6–4

== Titles Champions ==
=== Singles ===
#	Player	IN	MI	MO	HA	RO	CA	CI	ST	PA	#	Winning span
	(United States) Andre Agassi	-	3	-	-	-	3	2	-	1	9	1990–1996 (7)
	(United States) Pete Sampras	2	2	-	-	1	-	2	-	2	9	1992–1997 (6)
	(Austria) Thomas Muster	-	1	3	-	3	-	-	1	-	8	1990–1997 (8)
	(United States) Michael Chang	3	1	-	-	-	1	2	-	-	7	1990–1997 (8)
	(United States) Jim Courier	2	1	-	-	2	-	-	-	-	5	1991–1993 (3)
	(Germany) Boris Becker	-	-	-	-	-	-	-	4	1	5	1990–1996 (7)
	(Sweden) Stefan Edberg	1	-	-	1	-	-	1	-	1	4	1990–1992 (3)
	(Ukraine) Andrei Medvedev	-	-	1	3	-	-	-	-	-	4	1994–1997 (4)
	(Spain) Sergi Bruguera	-	-	2	-	-	-	-	-	-	2	1991–1993 (3)
	(Russia) Andrei Chesnokov	-	-	1	-	-	1	-	-	-	2	1990–1991 (2)
	(France) Guy Forget	-	-	-	-	-	-	1	-	1	2	1991
	(Croatia) Goran Ivanišević	-	-	-	-	-	-	-	1	1	2	1992–1993 (2)
	(Germany) Michael Stich	-	-	-	1	-	-	-	1	-	2	1993
	(Spain) Juan Aguilera	-	-	-	1	-	-	-	-	-	1	1990
	(Spain) Àlex Corretja	-	-	-	-	1	-	-	-	-	1	1997
	(Spain) Roberto Carretero	-	-	-	1	-	-	-	-	-	1	1996
	(Sweden) Thomas Enqvist	-	-	-	-	-	-	-	-	1	1	1996
	(South Africa) Wayne Ferreira	-	-	-	-	-	1	-	-	-	1	1996
	(Czech Republic) Petr Korda	-	-	-	-	-	-	-	1	-	1	1997
	(Czech Republic) Karel Nováček	-	-	-	1	-	-	-	-	-	1	1991
	(Sweden) Mikael Pernfors	-	-	-	-	-	1	-	-	-	1	1993
	(Chile) Marcelo Ríos	-	-	1	-	-	-	-	-	-	1	1997
	(Spain) Emilio Sánchez	-	-	-	-	1	-	-	-	-	1	1991
	(United States) Chris Woodruff	-	-	-	-	-	1	-	-	-	1	1997
#	Player	IN	MI	MO	HA	RO	CA	CI	ST	PA	#	Winning span

== See also ==
- ATP Tour Masters 1000
- 1997 ATP Tour
- 1997 WTA Tier I Series
- 1997 WTA Tour
