= 1997 WTA Tier I Series =

Women's professional tennis tour

Details
- Duration: January 27 – November 2
- Edition: 8th
- Tournaments: 9

Achievements (singles)
- Most titles: (Switzerland) Martina Hingis (3)
- Most finals: (Switzerland) Martina Hingis (United States) Monica Seles (3)

The WTA Tier I events are part of the elite tour for professional women's tennis organised by the WTA called the WTA Tour.

== Tournaments ==
Tournament	Country	Location	Surface	Date	Prize money
Toray Pan Pacific Open	Japan	Tokyo	Carpet (i)	Jan 27 – Feb 2	$926,250
State Farm Evert Cup	United States	Indian Wells	Hard	Mar 3 – 16	$1,250,000
The Lipton Championships	United States	Key Biscayne	Hard	Mar 17 – 30	$1,750,000
Family Circle Magazine Cup	United States	Hilton Head Island	Clay (green)	Mar 31 – Apr 6	$926,250
Italian Open	Italy	Rome	Clay (red)	May 5 – 11	$926,250
German Open	Germany	Berlin	Clay (red)	May 12 – 18	$926,250
du Maurier Open	Canada	Toronto	Hard	Aug 11 – 17	$926,250
European Indoor Championships	Switzerland	Zürich	Carpet (i)	Oct 13 – 19	$926,250
Kremlin Cup	Russia	Moscow	Carpet (i)	Oct 27 – Nov 2	$926,250

== Results ==
* First-time champion

Tournament	Singles champions	Runners-up	Score	Doubles champions	Runners-up	Score
Tokyo Singles – Doubles	(Switzerland) Martina Hingis*	(Germany) Steffi Graf	Walkover	(United States) Lindsay Davenport*	(United States) Gigi Fernández (Switzerland) Martina Hingis	6–4, 6–3
Tokyo Singles – Doubles	(Switzerland) Martina Hingis*	(Germany) Steffi Graf	Walkover	(Belarus) Natasha Zvereva	(United States) Gigi Fernández (Switzerland) Martina Hingis	6–4, 6–3
Indian Wells Singles – Doubles	(United States) Lindsay Davenport*	(Romania) Irina Spîrlea	6–2, 6–1	(United States) Lindsay Davenport (Belarus) Natasha Zvereva	(United States) Lisa Raymond (France) Nathalie Tauziat	6–3, 6–2
Miami Singles – Doubles	(Switzerland) Martina Hingis	(United States) Monica Seles	6–2, 6–1	(Spain) Arantxa Sánchez Vicario (Belarus) Natasha Zvereva	(Belgium) Sabine Appelmans (Netherlands) Miriam Oremans	6–2, 6–3
Hilton Head Singles – Doubles	(Switzerland) Martina Hingis	(United States) Monica Seles	3–6, 6–3, 7–6^{(7–5)}	(United States) Mary Joe Fernandez (Switzerland) Martina Hingis	(United States) Lindsay Davenport (Czech Republic) Jana Novotná	7–5, 4–6, 6–1
Rome Singles – Doubles	(France) Mary Pierce*	(Spain) Conchita Martínez	6–4, 6–0	(United States) Nicole Arendt (Netherlands) Manon Bollegraf	(Spain) Conchita Martínez (Argentina) Patricia Tarabini	6–2, 6–4
Berlin Singles – Doubles	(United States) Mary Joe Fernández*	(France) Mary Pierce	6–4, 6–2	(United States) Lindsay Davenport (Czech Republic) Jana Novotná	(United States) Gigi Fernández (Belarus) Natasha Zvereva	6–3, 3–6, 6–2
Toronto Singles – Doubles	(United States) Monica Seles	(Germany) Anke Huber	6–2, 6–4	(Indonesia) Yayuk Basuki* (Netherlands) Caroline Vis*	(United States) Nicole Arendt (Netherlands) Manon Bollegraf	3–6, 7–5, 6–4
Zürich Singles – Doubles	(United States) Lindsay Davenport	(France) Nathalie Tauziat	7–6^{(7–3)}, 7–5	(Switzerland) Martina Hingis (Spain) Arantxa Sánchez Vicario	(Latvia) Larisa Neiland (Czech Republic) Helena Suková	4–6, 6–4, 6–1
Moscow Singles – Doubles	(Czech Republic) Jana Novotná	(Japan) Ai Sugiyama	6–3, 6–4	(Spain) Arantxa Sánchez Vicario (Belarus) Natasha Zvereva	(Indonesia) Yayuk Basuki (Netherlands) Caroline Vis	5-3, def.

== See also ==
- WTA Tier I events
- 1997 WTA Tour
- 1997 ATP Super 9
- 1997 ATP Tour
