= 1997 Great American Insurance ATP Championships – Doubles =

Doubles
- 1997 Great American Insurance ATP Championships

Final
- Champions: (Australia) Todd Woodbridge (Australia) Mark Woodforde
- Runners-up: (Australia) Mark Philippoussis (Australia) Patrick Rafter
- Score: 7–6, 4–6, 6–4

Details
- Draw: 28 (4WC/2Q)
- Seeds: 8

Events
Singles	Doubles
← 1996 ·	Cincinnati Masters	· 1998 →

Mark Knowles and Daniel Nestor were the defending champions, but Knowles did not compete this year. Nestor teamed up with Cyril Suk and lost in quarterfinals to Olivier Delaître and Fabrice Santoro.

Todd Woodbridge and Mark Woodforde won the title by defeating Mark Philippoussis and Patrick Rafter 7–6, 4–6, 6–4 in an all-Australian final.

== Seeds ==
The first four seeds received a bye into the second round.

1. (Australia) Todd Woodbridge / (Australia) Mark Woodforde (champions)
2. (Russia) Yevgeny Kafelnikov / (Czech Republic) Daniel Vacek (second round)
3. (Canada) Sébastien Lareau / (United States) Alex O'Brien (semifinals)
4. (Canada) Daniel Nestor / (Czech Republic) Cyril Suk (quarterfinals)
5. (South Africa) Ellis Ferreira / (United States) Patrick Galbraith (quarterfinals)
6. (United States) Rick Leach / (United States) Jonathan Stark (first round)
7. (Australia) Mark Philippoussis / (Australia) Patrick Rafter (final)
8. (United States) Donald Johnson / (United States) Francisco Montana (second round)

== Draw ==
=== Key ===
- Q = Qualifier
- WC = Wild card
- LL = Lucky loser
- Alt = Alternate
- SE = Special exempt
- PR = Protected ranking
- ITF = ITF entry
- JE = Junior exempt
- w/o = Walkover
- r = Retired
- d = Defaulted
- SR = Special ranking

=== Finals ===
Semifinals
1	(Australia) Todd Woodbridge (Australia) Mark Woodforde	6	6
3	(Canada) Sébastien Lareau (United States) Alex O'Brien	2	1
(France) Olivier Delaître (France) Fabrice Santoro	6	6	4
7	(Australia) Mark Philippoussis (Australia) Patrick Rafter	4	7	6

Final
1	(Australia) Todd Woodbridge (Australia) Mark Woodforde	7	4	6
7	(Australia) Mark Philippoussis (Australia) Patrick Rafter	6	6	4

=== Top half ===
First round
(Netherlands) J Eltingh (Netherlands) J Siemerink	7	7
Q	(United States) B Bryan (United States) M Bryan	6	6
(United States) J Waite (Netherlands) F Wibier	0	4
(India) M Bhupathi (India) L Paes	6	6
Q	(Australia) S Draper (Australia) J Stoltenberg	5	1
8	(United States) D Johnson (United States) F Montana	7	6
(South Africa) D Adams (Zimbabwe) K Ullyett	4	4
(United States) T Kronemann (Australia) D Macpherson	6	6
(United States) J Grabb (Czech Republic) P Korda	4	2
(Argentina) P Albano (Spain) À Corretja	6	6
WC	(Croatia) G Ivanišević (United States) C Woodruff	6	6	6
5	(South Africa) E Ferreira (United States) P Galbraith	7	2	7

Second round
1	(Australia) T Woodbridge (Australia) M Woodforde	6	4	7
(Netherlands) J Eltingh (Netherlands) J Siemerink	2	6	5
(India) M Bhupathi (India) L Paes	7	5	6
8	(United States) D Johnson (United States) F Montana	5	7	4
3	(Canada) S Lareau (United States) A O'Brien	6	6
(United States) T Kronemann (Australia) D Macpherson	2	4
(Argentina) P Albano (Spain) À Corretja	7	4	3
5	(South Africa) E Ferreira (United States) P Galbraith	6	6	6

Quarterfinals
1	(Australia) T Woodbridge (Australia) M Woodforde	2	7	6
(India) M Bhupathi (India) L Paes	6	6	1
3	(Canada) S Lareau (United States) A O'Brien	6	7
5	(South Africa) E Ferreira (United States) P Galbraith	4	5

Semifinals
1	(Australia) T Woodbridge (Australia) M Woodforde	6	6
3	(Canada) S Lareau (United States) A O'Brien	2	1

=== Bottom half ===
First round
6	(United States) R Leach (United States) J Stark	6	4
(France) O Delaître (France) F Santoro	7	6
(Zimbabwe) B Black (New Zealand) B Steven	5	6
(United Kingdom) N Broad (South Africa) P Norval	7	7
WC	(Netherlands) S Groen (Brazil) G Kuerten	4	6	3
WC	(Germany) T Haas (Chile) M Ríos	6	4	6
7	(Australia) M Philippoussis (Australia) P Rafter	7	6
WC	(South Africa) W Ferreira (United Kingdom) T Henman	5	4
(Australia) J Eagle (Australia) A Florent	2	7	3
(United States) L Jensen (United States) M Jensen	6	6	6
(Sweden) J Björkman (Germany) MK Goellner	6	7
(Czech Republic) M Damm (Czech Republic) P Vízner	4	6

Second round
(France) O Delaître (France) F Santoro	7	6
(United Kingdom) N Broad (South Africa) P Norval	6	3
WC	(Germany) T Haas (Chile) M Ríos	2	5
4	(Canada) D Nestor (Czech Republic) C Suk	6	7
7	(Australia) M Philippoussis (Australia) P Rafter	6	6
(United States) L Jensen (United States) M Jensen	4	4
(Sweden) J Björkman (Germany) MK Goellner	4	7	7
2	(Russia) Y Kafelnikov (Czech Republic) D Vacek	6	6	6

Quarterfinals
(France) O Delaître (France) F Santoro	6	6
4	(Canada) D Nestor (Czech Republic) C Suk	4	2
7	(Australia) M Philippoussis (Australia) P Rafter	6	6
(Sweden) J Björkman (Germany) MK Goellner	2	3

Semifinals
(France) O Delaître (France) F Santoro	6	6	4
7	(Australia) M Philippoussis (Australia) P Rafter	4	7	6

== Qualifying ==
=== Qualifying seeds ===
1. (United States) Kelly Jones / (South Africa) Byron Talbot (qualifying competition)
2. (United States) Kent Kinnear / (North Macedonia) Aleksandar Kitinov (first round)
3. (Sweden) Peter Nyborg / (Sweden) Mikael Tillström (qualifying competition)
4. (United States) Vince Spadea / (United States) Eric Taino (first round)

=== Qualifiers ===
1. (Australia) Scott Draper / (Australia) Jason Stoltenberg
2. (United States) Bob Bryan / (United States) Mike Bryan

=== Qualifying draw ===
==== First qualifier ====
First round
1	(United States) Kelly Jones (South Africa) Byron Talbot	6	6
WC	(United States) Craig Boynton (United States) Craig Lindner	3	1
(Australia) Scott Draper (Australia) Jason Stoltenberg	6	6
4	(United States) Vince Spadea (United States) Eric Taino	3	1

Qualifying competition
1	(United States) Kelly Jones (South Africa) Byron Talbot	3	4
(Australia) Scott Draper (Australia) Jason Stoltenberg	6	6

==== Second qualifier ====
First round
2	(United States) Kent Kinnear (North Macedonia) Aleksandar Kitinov	6	4
WC	(United States) Bob Bryan (United States) Mike Bryan	7	6
WC	(United States) Chris Groer (United States) Andrew Rueb	6	3
3	(Sweden) Peter Nyborg (Sweden) Mikael Tillström	7	6

Qualifying competition
WC	(United States) Bob Bryan (United States) Mike Bryan	7	6
3	(Sweden) Peter Nyborg (Sweden) Mikael Tillström	6	4
