= 1997 Lipton Championships – Women's doubles =

Women's doubles
- 1997 Lipton Championships

Final
- Champions: (Spain) Arantxa Sánchez Vicario (Belarus) Natasha Zvereva
- Runners-up: (Belgium) Sabine Appelmans (Netherlands) Miriam Oremans
- Score: 6–2, 6–3

Events
Singles	men	women
Doubles	men	women
← 1996 ·	Lipton Championships	· 1998 →

Jana Novotná and Arantxa Sánchez Vicario were the defending champions but they competed with different partners that year, Novotná with Lindsay Davenport and Sánchez Vicario with Natasha Zvereva.

Davenport and Novotná lost in the third round to Sabine Appelmans and Miriam Oremans.

Sánchez Vicario and Zvereva won in the final 6–2, 6–3 against Appelmans and Oremans.

== Seeds ==
Champion seeds are indicated in bold text while text in italics indicates the round in which those seeds were eliminated. All sixteen seeded teams received byes into the second round.

1. (Spain) **Arantxa Sánchez Vicario** / (Belarus) **Natasha Zvereva (champions)**
2. (Latvia) Larisa Neiland / (Czech Republic) Helena Suková (third round)
3. (United States) Lindsay Davenport / (Czech Republic) Jana Novotná (third round)
4. (United States) Mary Joe Fernández / (Switzerland) Martina Hingis (semifinals)
5. (United States) Nicole Arendt / (Netherlands) Manon Bollegraf (quarterfinals)
6. (France) Nathalie Tauziat / (United States) Linda Wild (quarterfinals)
7. (Argentina) Patricia Tarabini / (Netherlands) Caroline Vis (quarterfinals)
8. (Japan) Naoko Kijimuta / (Japan) Nana Miyagi (quarterfinals)
9. (United States) Amy Frazier / (United States) Kimberly Po (second round)
10. (United States) Katrina Adams / (South Africa) Mariaan de Swardt (second round)
11. (Belgium) Sabine Appelmans / (Netherlands) Miriam Oremans (final)
12. (United States) Chanda Rubin / (Netherlands) Brenda Schultz-McCarthy (third round)
13. (France) Alexandra Fusai / (Argentina) Mercedes Paz (third round)
14. (France) Alexia Dechaume-Balleret / (France) Sandrine Testud (third round)
15. (Italy) Silvia Farina / (Austria) Barbara Schett (second round)
16. (Japan) Rika Hiraki / (Argentina) Florencia Labat (third round)

== Draw ==
=== Key ===
- Q = Qualifier
- WC = Wild card
- LL = Lucky loser
- Alt = Alternate
- SE = Special exempt
- PR = Protected ranking
- ITF = ITF entry
- JE = Junior exempt
- w/o = Walkover
- r = Retired
- d = Defaulted
- SR = Special ranking

=== Finals ===
Semifinals
1	(Spain) Arantxa Sánchez Vicario (Belarus) Natasha Zvereva	6	1	7
4	(United States) Mary Joe Fernández (Switzerland) Martina Hingis	4	6	6
11	(Belgium) Sabine Appelmans (Netherlands) Miriam Oremans	6	6
(South Africa) Amanda Coetzer (Germany) Anke Huber	4	2

Final
1	(Spain) Arantxa Sánchez Vicario (Belarus) Natasha Zvereva	6	6
11	(Belgium) Sabine Appelmans (Netherlands) Miriam Oremans	2	3

=== Top half ===
==== Section 1 ====
First round
(United States) A Grossman (Slovakia) K Habšudová	5	6	6
(Germany) W Probst (Switzerland) P Schnyder	7	4	0
(Slovenia) T Križan (France) N van Lottum	7	1	4
(Netherlands) S Noorlander (Greece) C Papadáki	5	6	6
(Germany) B Rittner (Belgium) D Van Roost	6	6
(Russia) A Kournikova (Russia) E Likhovtseva	4	3
(Spain) V Ruano-Pascual (Argentina) P Suárez	2	4
(Canada) P Hy-Boulais (Canada) R Simpson	6	6

Second round
1	(Spain) A Sánchez Vicario (Belarus) N Zvereva	6	6
(United States) A Grossman (Slovakia) K Habšudová	4	4
(Netherlands) S Noorlander (Greece) C Papadáki	4	3
12	(United States) C Rubin (Netherlands) B Schultz-McCarthy	6	6
14	(France) A Dechaume-Balleret (France) S Testud	6	6
(Germany) B Rittner (Belgium) D Van Roost	0	2
(Canada) P Hy-Boulais (Canada) R Simpson	6	5	4
7	(Argentina) P Tarabini (Netherlands) C Vis	4	7	6

Third round
1	(Spain) A Sánchez Vicario (Belarus) N Zvereva	4	6	6
12	(United States) C Rubin (Netherlands) B Schultz-McCarthy	6	3	0
14	(France) A Dechaume-Balleret (France) S Testud	7	3	2
7	(Argentina) P Tarabini (Netherlands) C Vis	5	6	6

Quarterfinals
1	(Spain) A Sánchez Vicario (Belarus) N Zvereva	6	6
7	(Argentina) P Tarabini (Netherlands) C Vis	4	3

==== Section 2 ====
First round
(Czech Republic) E Martincová (Czech Republic) H Vildová	0	6	6
(Romania) R Dragomir (Croatia) I Majoli	6	3	1
Q	(Spain) Á Montolio (Australia) L Pleming	1	0
(Germany) C Porwik (Australia) K Radford	6	6
WC	(United States) L Raymond (United States) M Seles	2	2
(Argentina) I Gorrochategui (Romania) I Spîrlea	6	6
(Australia) D Jones (Czech Republic) L Němečková	0	5
(Australia) A Ellwood (Australia) R McQuillan	7	6

Second round
4	(United States) M J Fernández (Switzerland) M Hingis	6	6
(Czech Republic) E Martincová (Czech Republic) H Vildová	2	0
(Germany) C Porwik (Australia) K Radford	7	5	6^{3}
16	(Japan) R Hiraki (Argentina) F Labat	5	7	7^{7}
9	(United States) A Frazier (United States) K Po	6	2	4
(Argentina) I Gorrochategui (Romania) I Spîrlea	4	6	6
(Australia) A Ellwood (Australia) R McQuillan	1	6^{2}
6	(France) N Tauziat (United States) L Wild	6	7^{7}

Third round
4	(United States) M J Fernández (Switzerland) M Hingis	6	6
16	(Japan) R Hiraki (Argentina) F Labat	2	0
(Argentina) I Gorrochategui (Romania) I Spîrlea	6	3	5
6	(France) N Tauziat (United States) L Wild	3	6	7

Quarterfinals
4	(United States) M J Fernández (Switzerland) M Hingis	6	6
6	(France) N Tauziat (United States) L Wild	3	1

=== Bottom half ===
==== Section 3 ====
First round
(Belgium) E Callens (United States) G Helgeson-Nielsen	6	6
(United States) A Lettiere (United States) C Morariu	4	4
(United States) M Werdel-Witmeyer (United States) T Whitlinger-Jones	6	7
WC	(United States) J Lee (United States) L Lee	3	5
(United States) E deLone (United Kingdom) C Wood	7^{7}	1	6
(Italy) R Grande (Japan) A Sugiyama	6^{5}	6	4
(Italy) L Garrone (Argentina) L Montalvo	6	4	7^{7}
(Slovakia) H Nagyová (Slovakia) R Zrubáková	1	6	6^{3}

Second round
8	(Japan) N Kijimuta (Japan) N Miyagi	7	6
(Belgium) E Callens (United States) G Helgeson-Nielsen	5	3
(United States) M Werdel-Witmeyer (United States) T Whitlinger-Jones	7	6
10	(United States) K Adams (South Africa) M de Swardt	5	3
11	(Belgium) S Appelmans (Netherlands) M Oremans	6	6
(United States) E deLone (United Kingdom) C Wood	3	2
(Italy) L Garrone (Argentina) L Montalvo	3	1
3	(United States) L Davenport (Czech Republic) J Novotná	6	6

Third round
8	(Japan) N Kijimuta (Japan) N Miyagi	6	6
(United States) M Werdel-Witmeyer (United States) T Whitlinger-Jones	2	4
11	(Belgium) S Appelmans (Netherlands) M Oremans	4	6	6
3	(United States) L Davenport (Czech Republic) J Novotná	6	4	4

Quarterfinals
8	(Japan) N Kijimuta (Japan) N Miyagi	3	5
11	(Belgium) S Appelmans (Netherlands) M Oremans	6	7

==== Section 4 ====
First round
(Italy) L Golarsa (Germany) C Singer	4	6	6
(Canada) S Jeyaseelan (South Africa) R Nideffer	6	3	0
(United States) L McNeil (Croatia) M Murić	6	6
(Sweden) Å Carlsson (Italy) F Perfetti	3	3
(France) A-G Sidot (Sweden) M Strandlund	6	5	3
(South Africa) A Coetzer (Germany) A Huber	4	7	6
(Ukraine) O Lugina (Germany) E Wagner	7^{7}	5	0
(Japan) M Saeki (Chinese Taipei) S-T Wang	6^{3}	7	6

Second round
5	(United States) N Arendt (Netherlands) M Bollegraf	4	6	6
(Italy) L Golarsa (Germany) C Singer	6	4	3
(United States) L McNeil (Croatia) M Murić	3	5
13	(France) A Fusai (Argentina) M Paz	6	7
15	(Italy) S Farina (Austria) B Schett	7	1	3
(South Africa) A Coetzer (Germany) A Huber	5	6	6
(Japan) M Saeki (Chinese Taipei) S-T Wang	5	4
2	(Latvia) L Neiland (Czech Republic) H Suková	7	6

Third round
5	(United States) N Arendt (Netherlands) M Bollegraf	6	6
13	(France) A Fusai (Argentina) M Paz	2	4
(South Africa) A Coetzer (Germany) A Huber	6	7
2	(Latvia) L Neiland (Czech Republic) H Suková	0	5

Quarterfinals
5	(United States) N Arendt (Netherlands) M Bollegraf	2	3
(South Africa) A Coetzer (Germany) A Huber	6	6
