= 1997 du Maurier Open – Women's doubles =

Women's doubles
- 1997 du Maurier Open

Final
- Champions: (Indonesia) Yayuk Basuki (Netherlands) Caroline Vis
- Runners-up: (United States) Nicole Arendt (Netherlands) Manon Bollegraf
- Score: 3–6, 7–5, 6–4

Details
- Draw: 28 (1WC/1Q)
- Seeds: 8

Events
Singles	men	women
Doubles	men	women
- Canadian Open

Larisa Savchenko and Arantxa Sánchez Vicario were the defending champions but they competed with different partners that year, Savchenko with Helena Suková and Sánchez Vicario with Mary Joe Fernández.

Fernández and Sánchez Vicario lost in the quarterfinals to Yayuk Basuki and Caroline Vis.

Savchenko and Suková lost in the semifinals to Nicole Arendt and Manon Bollegraf.

Basuki and Vis won in the final 3–6, 7–5, 6–4 against Arendt and Bollegraf.

== Seeds ==
Champion seeds are indicated in bold text while text in italics indicates the round in which those seeds were eliminated. The top four seeded teams received byes into the second round.

1. (United States) Mary Joe Fernández / (Spain) Arantxa Sánchez Vicario (quarterfinals, retired)
2. (United States) Nicole Arendt / (Netherlands) Manon Bollegraf (final)
3. (Latvia) Larisa Savchenko / (Czech Republic) Helena Suková (semifinals)
4. (France) Alexandra Fusai / (France) Nathalie Tauziat (second round)
5. (Spain) Conchita Martínez / (Argentina) Patricia Tarabini (second round)
6. (Indonesia) **Yayuk Basuki** / (Netherlands) **Caroline Vis (champions)**
7. (Japan) Naoko Kijimuta / (Japan) Nana Miyagi (quarterfinals)
8. (United States) Lisa Raymond / (Australia) Rennae Stubbs (quarterfinals)

== Draw ==
Key

- Q = Qualifier
- WC = Wild card
- LL = Lucky loser
- Alt = Alternate
- ITF = ITF entry
- PR = Protected ranking
- SR = Special ranking
- SE = Special exempt
- JE = Junior exempt
- JR = Junior Accelerator Programme entrant
- CO = College Accelerator Programme entrant
- NG = Next Gen Accelerator Program entrant
- w/o = Walkover
- r = Retired
- d = Defaulted

=== Final ===
Final
6	(Indonesia) **Yayuk Basuki** (Netherlands) **Caroline Vis**	3	**7**	**6**
2	(United States) Nicole Arendt (Netherlands) Manon Bollegraf	**6**	5	4

=== Top half ===
First round
(Belgium) **S Appelmans** (United States) **L Wild**	**6**	4	**6**
(Italy) S Farina (Germany) B Rittner	3	**6**	4
(Germany) M Babel (United States) A Lettiere	**6**	2	3
(United States) **A Grossman** (Slovakia) **K Habšudová**	3	**6**	**6**
(Argentina) F Labat (Argentina) M Paz	3	3
6	(Indonesia) **Y Basuki** (Netherlands) **C Vis**	**6**	**6**
WC	(Canada) M Drake (Canada) J Nejedly	1	4
(Argentina) **I Gorrochategui** (Romania) **I Spîrlea**	**6**	**6**
(Romania) R Dragomir (Croatia) I Majoli	5	2
Q	(Romania) **C Cristea** (Argentina) **L Montalvo**	**7**	**6**
(South Africa) A Coetzer (France) M Pierce	2	4
8	(United States) **L Raymond** (Australia) **R Stubbs**	**6**	**6**

Second round
1	(United States) **M J Fernández** (Spain) **A Sánchez Vicario**	**6**	**6**
(Belgium) S Appelmans (United States) L Wild	3	4
(United States) A Grossman (Slovakia) K Habšudová	4	**6**	2
6	(Indonesia) **Y Basuki** (Netherlands) **C Vis**	**6**	2	**6**
4	(France) A Fusai (France) N Tauziat	**6**	3	2
(Argentina) **I Gorrochategui** (Romania) **I Spîrlea**	2	**6**	**6**
Q	(Romania) C Cristea (Argentina) L Montalvo	2	2
8	(United States) **L Raymond** (Australia) **R Stubbs**	**6**	**6**

Quarterfinals
1	(United States) M J Fernández (Spain) A Sánchez Vicario	1	0	r
6	(Indonesia) **Y Basuki** (Netherlands) **C Vis**	**6**	**1**
(Argentina) **I Gorrochategui** (Romania) **I Spîrlea**	3	**6**	**6**
8	(United States) L Raymond (Australia) R Stubbs	**6**	3	3

Semifinals
6	(Indonesia) **Y Basuki** (Netherlands) **C Vis**	4	**7**	**7**
(Argentina) I Gorrochategui (Romania) I Spîrlea	**6**	5	6

=== Bottom half ===
First round
5	(Spain) **C Martínez** (Argentina) **P Tarabini**	**6**	**6**
(Germany) A Huber (Thailand) T Tanasugarn	4	3
(Japan) M Saeki (Japan) Y Yoshida	**7**	0	6
(Belgium) **E Callens** (Italy) **R Grande**	6	**6**	**7**
(United States) **K Po** (Netherlands) **B Schultz-McCarthy**	2	**6**	**7**
(Canada) S Jeyaseelan (Canada) R Simpson	**6**	2	6
7	(Japan) **N Kijimuta** (Japan) **N Miyagi**	**6**	**6**
(France) A Dechaume-Balleret (France) S Testud	4	1
(South Africa) M de Swardt (Croatia) M Murić	4	4
(Russia) **E Likhovtseva** (Japan) **A Sugiyama**	**6**	**6**
(Sweden) **Å Carlsson** (Canada) **P Hy-Boulais**	**6**	**6**
(Australia) C Barclay (United Kingdom) C Wood	4	4

Second round
5	(Spain) C Martínez (Argentina) P Tarabini	6	4
(Belgium) **E Callens** (Italy) **R Grande**	**7**	**6**
(United States) K Po (Netherlands) B Schultz-McCarthy	6	2
3	(Latvia) **L Savchenko** (Czech Republic) **H Suková**	**7**	**6**
7	(Japan) **N Kijimuta** (Japan) **N Miyagi**	4	**6**	**6**
(Russia) E Likhovtseva (Japan) A Sugiyama	**6**	3	2
(Sweden) Å Carlsson (Canada) P Hy-Boulais	**7**	4	2
2	(United States) **N Arendt** (Netherlands) **M Bollegraf**	6	**6**	**6**

Quarterfinals
(Belgium) E Callens (Italy) R Grande	3	4
3	(Latvia) **L Savchenko** (Czech Republic) **H Suková**	**6**	**6**
7	(Japan) N Kijimuta (Japan) N Miyagi	**6**	3	2
2	(United States) **N Arendt** (Netherlands) **M Bollegraf**	4	**6**	**6**

Semifinals
3	(Latvia) L Savchenko (Czech Republic) H Suková	1	6
2	(United States) **N Arendt** (Netherlands) **M Bollegraf**	**6**	**7**

== Qualifying ==
=== Qualifying seeds ===
1. (Canada) Jill Hetherington / (United States) Kathy Rinaldi-Stunkel (first round)
2. **(Romania) Cătălina Cristea / (Argentina) Laura Montalvo (qualified)**

=== Qualifiers ===
1. **(Romania) Cătălina Cristea / (Argentina) Laura Montalvo**

=== Qualifying draw ===
First round
1	(Canada) Jill Hetherington (United States) Kathy Rinaldi-Stunkel	5
**(South Africa) Joannette Kruger** **(Austria) Marion Maruska**	**8**
**(Belarus) Olga Barabanschikova** **(Australia) Louise Pleming**	**8**
(Germany) Andrea Glass (Czech Republic) Sandra Kleinová	2
**(France) Nathalie Dechy** **(France) Sarah Pitkowski**	**8**
WC	(Canada) Renata Kolbovic (Canada) Vanessa Webb	3
(United States) Rebecca Jensen (Australia) Danielle Jones	2
2	**(Romania) Cătălina Cristea** **(Argentina) Laura Montalvo**	**8**

Second round
(South Africa) Joannette Kruger (Austria) Marion Maruska	2
**(Belarus) Olga Barabanschikova** **(Australia) Louise Pleming**	**8**
(France) Nathalie Dechy (France) Sarah Pitkowski	1
2	**(Romania) Cătălina Cristea** **(Argentina) Laura Montalvo**	**8**

Qualifying competition
(Belarus) Olga Barabanschikova (Australia) Louise Pleming	8
2	**(Romania) Cătălina Cristea** **(Argentina) Laura Montalvo**	**9**
