= 1997 Lipton Championships – Men's doubles =

Men's doubles
- 1997 Lipton Championships

Final
- Champions: (Australia) Todd Woodbridge (Australia) Mark Woodforde
- Runners-up: (The Bahamas) Mark Knowles (Canada) Daniel Nestor
- Score: 7–6, 7–6

Events
Singles	men	women
Doubles	men	women
← 1996 ·	Lipton Championships	· 1998 →

Todd Woodbridge and Mark Woodforde were the two-time defending champions and won in the final 7–6, 7–6 against Mark Knowles and Daniel Nestor.

== Seeds ==
All sixteen seeded teams received byes into the second round.

1. (Australia) Todd Woodbridge / (Australia) Mark Woodforde (champions)
2. (Netherlands) Jacco Eltingh / (Netherlands) Paul Haarhuis (third round)
3. (South Africa) Ellis Ferreira / (United States) Patrick Galbraith (second round)
4. (Zimbabwe) Byron Black / (Canada) Grant Connell (quarterfinals)
5. (The Bahamas) Mark Knowles / (Canada) Daniel Nestor (final)
6. (Canada) Sébastien Lareau / (United States) Alex O'Brien (third round)
7. (United States) Rick Leach / (United States) Jonathan Stark (quarterfinals)
8. (Sweden) Jonas Björkman / (Sweden) Nicklas Kulti (third round)
9. (Argentina) Luis Lobo / (Spain) Javier Sánchez (semifinals)
10. (Belgium) Libor Pimek / (South Africa) Byron Talbot (second round)
11. (Australia) Sandon Stolle / (Czech Republic) Cyril Suk (third round)
12. (United Kingdom) Neil Broad / (South Africa) Piet Norval (semifinals)
13. n/a
14. (United States) Donald Johnson / (United States) Francisco Montana (second round)
15. (Netherlands) Stephen Noteboom / (Sweden) Peter Nyborg (second round)
16. (Czech Republic) Jiří Novák / (Czech Republic) David Rikl (third round)

== Draw ==
=== Key ===
- Q = Qualifier
- WC = Wild card
- LL = Lucky loser
- Alt = Alternate
- SE = Special exempt
- PR = Protected ranking
- ITF = ITF entry
- JE = Junior exempt
- w/o = Walkover
- r = Retired
- d = Defaulted
- SR = Special ranking

=== Finals ===
Semifinals

Final

1
- (Australia) Todd Woodbridge
- (Australia) Mark Woodforde
6
6

12
- (United Kingdom) Neil Broad
- (South Africa) Piet Norval
3
4

1
- (Australia) Todd Woodbridge
- (Australia) Mark Woodforde
7
7

5
- (The Bahamas) Mark Knowles
- (Canada) Daniel Nestor
6
6

5
- (The Bahamas) Mark Knowles
- (Canada) Daniel Nestor
6
7

9
- (Argentina) Luis Lobo
- (Spain) Javier Sánchez
3
6

=== Top half ===
==== Section 1 ====
First round

Second round

Third round

Quarterfinals

1
- (Australia) T Woodbridge
- (Australia) M Woodforde
6
6

- (United Kingdom) T Henman
- (Netherlands) J Siemerink

- (United States) K Jones
- (United States) S Melville
3
4

- (United States) K Jones
- (United States) S Melville
w/o

1
- (Australia) T Woodbridge
- (Australia) M Woodforde
7
6

- (United States) B MacPhie
- (South Africa) G Muller
6
6
6

16
- (Czech Republic) J Novák
- (Czech Republic) D Rikl
6
1

WC
- (United States) J Courier
- (Switzerland) M Rosset
7
3
7

WC
- (United States) J Courier
- (Switzerland) M Rosset
4
5

16
- (Czech Republic) J Novák
- (Czech Republic) D Rikl
6
7

1
- (Australia) T Woodbridge
- (Australia) M Woodforde
6
6

7
- (United States) R Leach
- (United States) J Stark
4
3

10
- (Belgium) L Pimek
- (South Africa) B Talbot
4
4

WC
- (Spain) A Costa
- (Spain) C Moyá
4
6
5

- (France) J-P Fleurian
- (United States) J Waite
6
6

- (France) J-P Fleurian
- (United States) J Waite
6
2
7

- (France) J-P Fleurian
- (United States) J Waite
6
4

WC
- (United Kingdom) M Petchey
- (United Kingdom) A Richardson
4
6
3

7
- (United States) R Leach
- (United States) J Stark
7
6

Q
- (United States) S Humphries
- (United States) J Salzenstein
6
3
6

Q
- (United States) S Humphries
- (United States) J Salzenstein
3
2

7
- (United States) R Leach
- (United States) J Stark
6
6

==== Section 2 ====
First round

Second round

Third round

Quarterfinals

3
- (South Africa) E Ferreira
- (United States) P Galbraith
5
1

- (United States) J Gimelstob
- (Czech Republic) P Korda
2
2

- (Germany) M-K Goellner
- (France) G Raoux
7
6

- (Germany) M-K Goellner
- (France) G Raoux
6
6

- (Germany) M-K Goellner
- (France) G Raoux
7
3
6

- (Netherlands) H J Davids
- (Netherlands) S Schalken
7
3
6

- (Netherlands) H J Davids
- (Netherlands) S Schalken
6
6
7

- (United States) D Flach
- (United States) T. J. Middleton
5
6
2

- (Netherlands) H J Davids
- (Netherlands) S Schalken
7
6

14
- (United States) D Johnson
- (United States) F Montana
5
2

- (Netherlands) H J Davids
- (Netherlands) S Schalken
3
5

12
- (United Kingdom) N Broad
- (South Africa) P Norval
6
7

12
- (United Kingdom) N Broad
- (South Africa) P Norval
7
6

- (Spain) À Corretja
- (Spain) E Sánchez
7
5
5

- (Italy) A Gaudenzi
- (Croatia) G Ivanišević
5
3

- (Italy) A Gaudenzi
- (Croatia) G Ivanišević
6
7
7

12
- (United Kingdom) N Broad
- (South Africa) P Norval
6
6

- (United States) K Kinnear
- (United States) D Randall
6
6
5

6
- (Canada) S Lareau
- (United States) A O'Brien
3
4

- (South Africa) J-L de Jager
- (United States) M Keil
3
7
7

- (South Africa) J-L de Jager
- (United States) M Keil
1
5

6
- (Canada) S Lareau
- (United States) A O'Brien
6
7

=== Bottom half ===
==== Section 3 ====
First round

Second round

Third round

Quarterfinals

5
- (The Bahamas) M Knowles
- (Canada) D Nestor
7
6

- (Argentina) L Arnold
- (Argentina) J Frana
6
6

- (Argentina) L Arnold
- (Argentina) J Frana
6
4

- (Netherlands) T Kempers
- (Netherlands) T Nijssen
4
4

5
- (The Bahamas) M Knowles
- (Canada) D Nestor
6
6

- (United States) T Ho
- (United States) B Shelton
6
6
6

11
- (Australia) S Stolle
- (Czech Republic) C Suk
2
3

- (Czech Republic) C Doseděl
- (Czech Republic) P Vízner
4
7
7

- (Czech Republic) C Doseděl
- (Czech Republic) P Vízner
2
5

11
- (Australia) S Stolle
- (Czech Republic) C Suk
6
7

5
- (The Bahamas) M Knowles
- (Canada) D Nestor
6
6

4
- (Zimbabwe) B Black
- (Canada) G Connell
4
4

LL
- (Brazil) G Kuerten
- (Brazil) F Meligeni
6
2

Q
- (United States) B Behrens
- (Argentina) D Orsanic
4
4

- (Sweden) R Bergh
- (South Africa) B Haygarth
7
6

- (Sweden) R Bergh
- (South Africa) B Haygarth
6
6

- (Sweden) R Bergh
- (South Africa) B Haygarth
3
2

- (Australia) P Cash
- (Australia) M Tebbutt
3
6
6

4
- (Zimbabwe) B Black
- (Canada) G Connell
6
6

- (India) M Bhupathi
- (India) L Paes
6
2
7

- (India) M Bhupathi
- (India) L Paes
4
6

4
- (Zimbabwe) B Black
- (Canada) G Connell
6
7

==== Section 4 ====
First round

Second round

Third round

Quarterfinals

8
- (Sweden) J Björkman
- (Sweden) N Kulti
7
6
6

- (South Africa) M Ondruska
- (South Africa) G Stafford
6
6

- (South Africa) M Ondruska
- (South Africa) G Stafford
6
7
2

- (United States) L Jensen
- (United States) M Jensen
4
1

8
- (Sweden) J Björkman
- (Sweden) N Kulti
5
6
3

- (United States) K Thorne
- (South Africa) C van Rensburg
6
3
2

9
- (Argentina) L Lobo
- (Spain) J Sánchez
7
3
6

WC
- (Australia) A Kratzmann
- (Ecuador) N Lapentti
2
6
6

WC
- (Australia) A Kratzmann
- (Ecuador) N Lapentti
2
6

9
- (Argentina) L Lobo
- (Spain) J Sánchez
6
7

9
- (Argentina) L Lobo
- (Spain) J Sánchez
6
6

WC
- (South Africa) W Ferreira
- (Australia) P Kilderry
3
1

15
- (Netherlands) S Noteboom
- (Sweden) P Nyborg
4
6
3

- (United States) S Cannon
- (The Bahamas) R Smith
7
5
3

WC
- (South Africa) W Ferreira
- (Australia) P Kilderry
6
3
6

WC
- (South Africa) W Ferreira
- (Australia) P Kilderry
6
7
6

WC
- (South Africa) W Ferreira
- (Australia) P Kilderry
5
7
6

- (United States) S Davis
- (Australia) D Macpherson
6
3
7

2
- (Netherlands) J Eltingh
- (Netherlands) P Haarhuis
7
6
3

- (United States) J Tarango
- (United States) C Woodruff
4
6
6

- (United States) S Davis
- (Australia) D Macpherson
4
6

2
- (Netherlands) J Eltingh
- (Netherlands) P Haarhuis
6
7
