= 1997 du Maurier Open – Men's doubles =

Men's doubles
- 1997 du Maurier Open

Final
- Champions: (India) Mahesh Bhupathi (India) Leander Paes
- Runners-up: (Canada) Sébastien Lareau (United States) Alex O'Brien
- Score: 7–6, 6–3

Details
- Draw: 28 (4WC/2Q)
- Seeds: 8

Events
Singles	men	women
Doubles	men	women
- Canadian Open

Patrick Galbraith and Paul Haarhuis were the defending champions, but Haarhuis did not compete this year. Galbraith teamed up with Ellis Ferreira and lost in second round to Trevor Kronemann and David Macpherson.

Mahesh Bhupathi and Leander Paes won the title by defeating Sébastien Lareau and Alex O'Brien 7–6, 6–3 in the final.

== Seeds ==
1. (Russia) Yevgeny Kafelnikov / (Czech Republic) Daniel Vacek (quarterfinals)
2. (The Bahamas) Mark Knowles / (Canada) Daniel Nestor (second round, retired)
3. (Canada) Sébastien Lareau / (United States) Alex O'Brien (final)
4. (South Africa) Ellis Ferreira / (United States) Patrick Galbraith (second round)
5. (United States) Rick Leach / (United States) Jonathan Stark (second round)
6. (Australia) Mark Philippoussis / (Australia) Patrick Rafter (quarterfinals)
7. (Australia) Sandon Stolle / (Czech Republic) Cyril Suk (second round, withdrew)
8. (n/a)

== Draw ==
Key

- Q = Qualifier
- WC = Wild card
- LL = Lucky loser
- Alt = Alternate
- ITF = ITF entry
- PR = Protected ranking
- SR = Special ranking
- SE = Special exempt
- JE = Junior exempt
- JR = Junior Accelerator Programme entrant
- CO = College Accelerator Programme entrant
- NG = Next Gen Accelerator Program entrant
- w/o = Walkover
- r = Retired
- d = Defaulted

=== Finals ===
Semifinals
Q	(North Macedonia) Aleksandar Kitinov (United States) Jeff Salzenstein	3	4
3	(Canada) Sébastien Lareau (United States) Alex O'Brien	6	6
(United States) Trevor Kronemann (Australia) David Macpherson	6	3
(India) Mahesh Bhupathi (India) Leander Paes	7	6

Final
3	(Canada) Sébastien Lareau (United States) Alex O'Brien	6	3
(India) Mahesh Bhupathi (India) Leander Paes	7	6

=== Top half ===
First round
WC	(Sweden) J Björkman (United Kingdom) T Henman	6	6	7
(Belarus) M Mirnyi (Sweden) P Nyborg	7	3	6
Q	(North Macedonia) A Kitinov (United States) J Salzenstein	6	7
WC	(Canada) B Kokavec (Brazil) G Kuerten	3	5
(Netherlands) S Groen (Croatia) G Ivanišević	6	2
7	(Australia) S Stolle (Czech Republic) C Suk	7	6
(France) O Delaître (France) F Santoro	6	3	6
(United States) L Jensen (United States) M Jensen	2	6	3
(Netherlands) J Eltingh (Netherlands) J Siemerink	4	3
Q	(South Africa) N Godwin (Armenia) S Sargsian	6	6
(South Africa) M Ondruska (South Africa) G Stafford	0	1
5	(United States) R Leach (United States) J Stark	6	6

Second round
1	(Russia) Y Kafelnikov (Czech Republic) D Vacek	6	4	6
WC	(Sweden) J Björkman (United Kingdom) T Henman	3	6	3
Q	(North Macedonia) A Kitinov (United States) J Salzenstein	w/o
7	(Australia) S Stolle (Czech Republic) C Suk
3	(Canada) S Lareau (United States) A O'Brien	6	6
(France) O Delaître (France) F Santoro	3	0
Q	(South Africa) N Godwin (Armenia) S Sargsian	6	3	7
5	(United States) R Leach (United States) J Stark	3	6	6

Quarterfinals
1	(Russia) Y Kafelnikov (Czech Republic) D Vacek	3	2
Q	(North Macedonia) A Kitinov (United States) J Salzenstein	6	6
3	(Canada) S Lareau (United States) A O'Brien	6	5	6
Q	(South Africa) N Godwin (Armenia) S Sargsian	3	7	4

Semifinals
Q	(North Macedonia) A Kitinov (United States) J Salzenstein	3	4
3	(Canada) S Lareau (United States) A O'Brien	6	6

=== Bottom half ===
First round
6	(Australia) M Philippoussis (Australia) P Rafter	6	6	6
(South Africa) D Adams (South Africa) B Talbot	7	3	3
(United States) K Jones (United States) TJ Middleton	6	6	6
(United Kingdom) N Broad (South Africa) P Norval	4	7	3
(United States) T Kronemann (Australia) D Macpherson	6	6
(Zimbabwe) B Black (United States) J Gimelstob	2	3
(Czech Republic) M Damm (Czech Republic) P Vízner	4	3
(United States) D Johnson (United States) F Montana	6	6
(Australia) J Eagle (Australia) A Florent	6	4	4
(India) M Bhupathi (India) L Paes	2	6	6
WC	(Canada) S Leblanc (United States) P McEnroe	6	2	3
WC	(Germany) T Haas (Canada) J Robichaud	1	6	6

Second round
6	(Australia) M Philippoussis (Australia) P Rafter	7	7
(United States) K Jones (United States) TJ Middleton	6	6
(United States) T Kronemann (Australia) D Macpherson	3	6	6
4	(South Africa) E Ferreira (United States) P Galbraith	6	4	4
(United States) D Johnson (United States) F Montana	6	4	6
(India) M Bhupathi (India) L Paes	3	6	7
WC	(Germany) T Haas (Canada) J Robichaud	3
2	(The Bahamas) M Knowles (Canada) D Nestor	4^{r}

Quarterfinals
6	(Australia) M Philippoussis (Australia) P Rafter	6	3	4
(United States) T Kronemann (Australia) D Macpherson	4	6	6
(India) M Bhupathi (India) L Paes	6	6
WC	(Germany) T Haas (Canada) J Robichaud	3	4

Semifinals
(United States) T Kronemann (Australia) D Macpherson	6	3
(India) M Bhupathi (India) L Paes	7	6

== Qualifying ==
=== Qualifying seeds ===
1. (North Macedonia) Aleksandar Kitinov / (United States) Jeff Salzenstein (qualified)
2. (South Africa) Neville Godwin / (Armenia) Sargis Sargsian (qualified)
3. (United States) Doug Flach / (United States) Chris Woodruff (qualifying competition)
4. (Australia) Scott Draper / (United States) Vince Spadea (first round)

=== Qualifiers ===
1. (North Macedonia) Aleksandar Kitinov / (United States) Jeff Salzenstein
2. (South Africa) Neville Godwin / (Armenia) Sargis Sargsian

=== Qualifying draw ===
==== First qualifier ====
First round
1	(North Macedonia) Aleksandar Kitinov (United States) Jeff Salzenstein	6	6
WC	(Canada) Simon Larose (Canada) Frédéric Niemeyer	4	4
(Switzerland) Lorenzo Manta (Australia) Michael Tebbutt	4	6	6
4	(Australia) Scott Draper (United States) Vince Spadea	6	3	3

Qualifying competition
1	(North Macedonia) Aleksandar Kitinov (United States) Jeff Salzenstein	6	7
(Switzerland) Lorenzo Manta (Australia) Michael Tebbutt	2	6

==== Second qualifier ====
First round
2	(South Africa) Neville Godwin (Armenia) Sargis Sargsian	6	6
WC	(Canada) Jonathan Arpin (Canada) Charles-Antoine Sévigny	2	1
WC	(Canada) Emin Ağayev (Canada) Ryan Clark	3	5
3	(United States) Doug Flach (United States) Chris Woodruff	6	7

Qualifying competition
2	(South Africa) Neville Godwin (Armenia) Sargis Sargsian	6	4	6
3	(United States) Doug Flach (United States) Chris Woodruff	3	6	3
