= 1997 Great American Insurance ATP Championships – Singles =

Singles
- 1997 Great American Insurance ATP Championships

Final
- Champion: (United States) Pete Sampras
- Runner-up: (Austria) Thomas Muster
- Score: 6–3, 6–4

Details
- Draw: 56
- Seeds: 16

Events
Singles	Doubles
← 1996 ·	Great American Insurance ATP Championships	· 1998 →

Pete Sampras defeated Thomas Muster in the final, 6–3, 6–4 to win the singles tennis title at the 1997 Cincinnati Masters.

Andre Agassi was the two-time defending champion, but lost in the first round to Gustavo Kuerten.

== Seeds ==
The top eight seeds received a bye to the second round.

1. (United States) Pete Sampras (champion)
2. (United States) Michael Chang (semifinals)
3. (Croatia) Goran Ivanišević (third round)
4. (Spain) Álex Corretja (third round)
5. (Austria) Thomas Muster (final)
6. (Spain) Sergi Bruguera (quarterfinals)
7. (Russia) Yevgeny Kafelnikov (quarterfinals)
8. (Sweden) Thomas Enqvist (second round)
9. (Chile) Marcelo Ríos (third round)
10. (Brazil) Gustavo Kuerten (quarterfinals)
11. (Australia) Mark Philippoussis (first round)
12. (Netherlands) Richard Krajicek (second round)
13. (Czech Republic) Petr Korda (second round)
14. (Spain) Álbert Costa (semifinals)
15. (United Kingdom) Tim Henman (first round)
16. (Australia) Patrick Rafter (third round)

== Draw ==
=== Key ===
- Q = Qualifier
- WC = Wild card
- LL = Lucky loser
- Alt = Alternate
- SE = Special exempt
- PR = Protected ranking
- ITF = ITF entry
- JE = Junior exempt
- w/o = Walkover
- r = Retired
- d = Defaulted
- SR = Special ranking

=== Finals ===
Semifinals
1	(United States) Pete Sampras	6	6
14	(Spain) Álbert Costa	3	4
5	(Austria) Thomas Muster	6	4	7^{7}
2	(United States) Michael Chang	3	6	6^{2}

Final
1	(United States) Pete Sampras	6	6
5	(Austria) Thomas Muster	3	4

=== Top half ===
==== Section 1 ====
First round
WC	(United States) J Gimelstob	6	6
(Zimbabwe) B Black	3	4
(Czech Republic) D Vacek	6^{5}	2
Q	(United States) D Wheaton	7^{7}	6
(Sweden) M Larsson	7	4	5
16	(Australia) P Rafter	5	6	7
9	(Chile) M Ríos	6	7
(Sweden) J Björkman	3	5
(Sweden) T Johansson	6	3	6
Q	(Zimbabwe) K Ullyett	4	6	2
(Armenia) S Sargsian	2	4
(United States) C Woodruff	6	6

Second round
1	(United States) P Sampras	6	6
WC	(United States) J Gimelstob	2	4
Q	(United States) D Wheaton	6	3	2
16	(Australia) P Rafter	3	6	6
9	(Chile) M Ríos	6	6
(Sweden) T Johansson	3	2
(United States) C Woodruff	6^{3}	6^{6}
7	(Russia) Y Kafelnikov	7^{7}	7^{7}

Third round
1	(United States) P Sampras	7^{7}	6
16	(Australia) P Rafter	6^{4}	4
9	(Chile) M Ríos	5	2
7	(Russia) Y Kafelnikov	7	6

Quarterfinals
1	(United States) P Sampras	6	6
7	(Russia) Y Kafelnikov	2	2

==== Section 2 ====
First round
(United Kingdom) G Rusedski	6	3	6^{3}
(United States) J Stark	1	6	7^{7}
(South Africa) G Stafford	4	6	4
(Germany) T Haas	6	4	6
(United States) J Courier	6	6^{5}	3
14	(Spain) Á Costa	4	7^{7}	6
11	(Australia) M Philippoussis	6^{5}	3
(Netherlands) S Schalken	7^{7}	6
(Czech Republic) J Novák	7	7^{7}
(Germany) M-K Goellner	5	6^{5}
(United States) R Reneberg	6	6^{3}	4
(Australia) S Draper	1	7^{7}	6

Second round
4	(Spain) Á Corretja	7^{7}	6
(United States) J Stark	6^{4}	4
(Germany) T Haas	3	4
14	(Spain) Á Costa	6	6
(Netherlands) S Schalken	3	2
(Czech Republic) J Novák	6	6
(Australia) S Draper	6^{6}	2
6	(Spain) S Bruguera	7^{8}	6

Third round
4	(Spain) Á Corretja	1	6^{3}
14	(Spain) Á Costa	6	7^{7}
(Czech Republic) J Novák	6^{5}	3
6	(Spain) S Bruguera	7^{7}	6

Quarterfinals
14	(Spain) Á Costa	4	6	5
6	(Spain) S Bruguera	6	3	2^{r}

=== Bottom half ===
==== Section 3 ====
First round
(France) F Santoro	6	6
WC	(United States) P McEnroe	0	4
(Czech Republic) M Damm	6	7^{7}
(France) G Raoux	3	6^{2}
(France) C Pioline	3	4
12	(Netherlands) R Krajicek	6	6
13	(Czech Republic) P Korda	7^{7}	6
(Sweden) M Tillström	6^{4}	1
(Netherlands) J Siemerink	7^{7}	7^{7}
Q	(New Zealand) B Steven	6^{5}	6^{1}
(United States) A O'Brien	2	1
Q	(Canada) D Nestor	6	6

Second round
5	(Austria) T Muster	6	5	6
(France) F Santoro	3	7	4
(Czech Republic) M Damm	6	7^{7}
12	(Netherlands) R Krajicek	4	6^{3}
13	(Czech Republic) P Korda	5	6	1
(Netherlands) J Siemerink	7	1	6
Q	(Canada) D Nestor	6	5	6^{6}
3	(Croatia) G Ivanišević	4	7	7^{8}

Third round
5	(Austria) T Muster	6	3	7
(Czech Republic) M Damm	3	6	5
(Netherlands) J Siemerink	6	6
3	(Croatia) G Ivanišević	4	4

Quarterfinals
5	(Austria) T Muster	6^{1}	7^{7}	7^{7}
(Netherlands) J Siemerink	7^{7}	6^{3}	6^{5}

==== Section 4 ====
First round
Q	(United States) V Spadea	6	6
Q	(France) J Golmard	2	1
(Australia) J Stoltenberg	6	6^{3}	3
(Australia) T Woodbridge	3	7^{7}	6
(United States) A Agassi	3	1
10	(Brazil) G Kuerten	6	6
15	(United Kingdom) T Henman	3	3
(Ukraine) A Medvedev	6	6
(Australia) M Woodforde	6	3	6
Q	(France) O Delaître	2	6	0
(France) A Boetsch	3	4
(South Africa) W Ferreira	6	6

Second round
8	(Sweden) T Enqvist	7^{7}	3	3
Q	(United States) V Spadea	6^{1}	6	6
(Australia) T Woodbridge	6	1	4
10	(Brazil) G Kuerten	3	6	6
(Ukraine) A Medvedev	6	1	7^{7}
(Australia) M Woodforde	4	6	6^{4}
(South Africa) W Ferreira	7^{7}	1	2
2	(United States) M Chang	6^{4}	6	6

Third round
Q	(United States) V Spadea	7^{7}	3	4
10	(Brazil) G Kuerten	6^{5}	6	6
(Ukraine) A Medvedev	6	1	4
2	(United States) M Chang	3	6	6

Quarterfinals
10	(Brazil) G Kuerten	1	2
2	(United States) M Chang	6	6
