= 1997 du Maurier Open – Women's singles =

Women's singles
- 1997 du Maurier Open
- 1996 Champion: (United States) Monica Seles

Final
- Champion: (United States) Monica Seles
- Runner-up: (Germany) Anke Huber
- Score: 6–2, 6–4

Details
- Draw: 56 (2WC/8Q/1LL)
- Seeds: 16

Events
Singles	men	women
Doubles	men	women
- Canadian Open

Two-time defending champion Monica Seles defeated Anke Huber in the final, 6–2, 6–4 to win the women's singles tennis title at the 1997 Canadian Open.

== Seeds ==
A champion seed is indicated in bold text while text in italics indicates the round in which that seed was eliminated. The top eight seeds received a bye to the second round.

1. (United States) **Monica Seles (champion)**
2. (Croatia) Iva Majoli (second round)
3. (South Africa) Amanda Coetzer (quarterfinals)
4. (United States) Lindsay Davenport (quarterfinals)
5. (Spain) Arantxa Sánchez Vicario (third round)
6. (France) Mary Pierce (third round)
7. (Spain) Conchita Martínez (semifinals)
8. (Germany) Anke Huber (final)
9. (Romania) Irina Spîrlea (first round)
10. (United States) Mary Joe Fernández (semifinals, retired)
11. (United States) Kimberly Po (third round)
12. (Netherlands) Brenda Schultz-McCarthy (first round)
13. (Romania) Ruxandra Dragomir (first round)
14. (Slovakia) Karina Habšudová (first round)
15. (France) Sandrine Testud (third round)
16. (Belgium) Sabine Appelmans (third round)

== Draw ==
Key

- Q = Qualifier
- WC = Wild card
- LL = Lucky loser
- Alt = Alternate
- ITF = ITF entry
- PR = Protected ranking
- SR = Special ranking
- SE = Special exempt
- JE = Junior exempt
- JR = Junior Accelerator Programme entrant
- CO = College Accelerator Programme entrant
- NG = Next Gen Accelerator Program entrant
- w/o = Walkover
- r = Retired
- d = Defaulted

=== Finals ===
Semifinals
1	(United States) **Monica Seles**	**6**	**7**
7	(Spain) Conchita Martínez	2	6
8	(Germany) **Anke Huber**	3	**6**	0
10	(United States) Mary Joe Fernández	**6**	2	0^{r}

Final
1	(United States) **Monica Seles**	**6**	**6**
8	(Germany) Anke Huber	2	4

=== Top half ===
==== Section 1 ====
First round
(Sweden) **Å Carlsson**	**6**	**6**
Q	(United States) A Grossman	4	3
(France) **A Fusai**	**6**	**6**
(France) S Pitkowski	1	0
WC	(Canada) P Hy-Boulais	3	3
16	(Belgium) **S Appelmans**	**6**	**6**
13	(Romania) R Dragomir	0	1
(Thailand) **T Tanasugarn**	**6**	**6**
Q	(Italy) **R Grande**	**6**	3	**6**
(Germany) B Rittner	2	**6**	3
Q	(Canada) **S Jeyaseelan**	**6**	**7**
(Germany) M Babel	4	6

Second round
1	(United States) **M Seles**	**6**	**6**
(Sweden) Å Carlsson	2	4
(France) A Fusai	3	3
16	(Belgium) **S Appelmans**	**6**	**6**
(Thailand) T Tanasugarn	4	**6**	2
Q	(Italy) **R Grande**	**6**	2	**6**
Q	(Canada) S Jeyaseelan	1	1
6	(France) **M Pierce**	**6**	**6**

Third round
1	(United States) **M Seles**	**6**	**7**
16	(Belgium) S Appelmans	3	5
Q	(Italy) **R Grande**	**6**	**6**
6	(France) M Pierce	2	2

Quarterfinals
1	(United States) **M Seles**	**6**	**6**
Q	(Italy) R Grande	0	0

==== Section 2 ====
First round
(Belgium) E Callens	4	3
(Japan) **A Sugiyama**	**6**	**6**
(Spain) **M Serna**	**6**	**6**
Q	(Canada) R Kolbovic	2	2
Q	(Japan) **M Saeki**	4	**6**	**6**
9	(Romania) I Spîrlea	**6**	3	2
12	(Netherlands) B Schultz-McCarthy	4	**6**	3
(Japan) **N Kijimuta**	**6**	2	**6**
(Indonesia) **Y Basuki**	**6**	**6**
(Czech Republic) S Kleinová	3	0
(Australia) A Ellwood	**7**	3	1
(Japan) **Y Yoshida**	5	**6**	**6**

Second round
WC/4	(United States) **L Davenport**	**6**	**7**
(Japan) A Sugiyama	2	6
(Spain) **M Serna**	**7**	4	**6**
Q	(Japan) M Saeki	6	**6**	3
(Japan) N Kijimuta	4	2
(Indonesia) **Y Basuki**	**6**	**6**
(Japan) Y Yoshida	3	**6**	1
7	(Spain) **C Martínez**	**6**	3	**6**

Third round
WC/4	(United States) **L Davenport**	**7**	**6**
(Spain) M Serna	5	4
(Indonesia) Y Basuki	1	4
7	(Spain) **C Martínez**	**6**	**6**

Quarterfinals
WC/4	(United States) L Davenport	4	**6**	2
7	(Spain) **C Martínez**	**6**	4	**6**

=== Bottom half ===
==== Section 3 ====
First round
(United States) L Wild	2	0
(Argentina) **F Labat**	**6**	**6**
Q	(Germany) A Glass	2	1
(United States) **L Raymond**	**6**	**6**
(Spain) M Sánchez Lorenzo	5	2
15	(France) **S Testud**	**7**	**6**
11	(United States) **K Po**	**6**	**7**
(France) N Tauziat	1	6
(Italy) S Farina	4	3
(United States) **J Capriati**	**6**	**6**
Q	(France) **N Dechy**	**6**	1	**6**
(United States) V Williams	1	**6**	1

Second round
8	(Germany) **A Huber**	**6**	**6**
(Argentina) F Labat	2	1
(United States) L Raymond	3	3
15	(France) **S Testud**	**6**	**6**
11	(United States) **K Po**	**6**	**6**
(United States) J Capriati	3	2
Q	(France) N Dechy	**6**	4	2
3	(South Africa) **A Coetzer**	4	**6**	**6**

Third round
8	(Germany) **A Huber**	**6**	**6**
15	(France) S Testud	3	4
11	(United States) K Po	3	3
3	(South Africa) **A Coetzer**	**6**	**6**

Quarterfinals
8	(Germany) **A Huber**	2	**6**	**6**
3	(South Africa) A Coetzer	**6**	1	4

==== Section 4 ====
First round
(United States) **A Miller**	**7**	2	**6**
(Russia) E Likhovtseva	6	**6**	3
(United States) **N Arendt**	**6**	**6**
(Czech Republic) H Suková	2	4
(South Africa) J Kruger	4	5
10	(United States) **M J Fernández**	**6**	**7**
14	(Slovakia) K Habšudová	3	3
(Bulgaria) **M Maleeva**	**6**	**6**
Q	(Russia) T Panova	2	6
LL	(Italy) **F Lubiani**	**6**	**7**
(Japan) **N Sawamatsu**	**6**	**6**
(United States) C Rubin	1	4

Second round
5	(Spain) **A Sánchez Vicario**	**6**	**6**
(United States) A Miller	2	1
(United States) N Arendt	4	2
10	(United States) **M J Fernández**	**6**	**6**
(Bulgaria) **M Maleeva**	6	**6**	**6**
LL	(Italy) F Lubiani	**7**	4	4
(Japan) **N Sawamatsu**	**7**	6	**6**
2	(Croatia) I Majoli	5	**7**	1

Third round
5	(Spain) A Sánchez Vicario	4	3
10	(United States) **M J Fernández**	**6**	**6**
(Bulgaria) **M Maleeva**	**7**	**6**
(Japan) N Sawamatsu	5	4

Quarterfinals
10	(United States) **M J Fernández**	**6**	6	**6**
(Bulgaria) M Maleeva	2	**7**	4

== Qualifying ==
=== Qualifying seeds ===
1. (Austria) Marion Maruska (first round)
2. (Romania) Cătălina Cristea (first round)
3. (Italy) Francesca Lubiani (qualifying competition, **lucky loser**)
4. (Italy) **Rita Grande (qualified)**
5. (United States) **Ann Grossman (qualified)**
6. (France) Alexia Dechaume-Balleret (first round, retired)
7. (Argentina) Inés Gorrochategui (first round)
8. (Netherlands) Kristie Boogert (first round)

=== Qualifiers ===
1. (Germany) **Andrea Glass**
2. (Russia) **Tatiana Panova**
3. (Canada) **Sonya Jeyaseelan**
4. (Japan) **Miho Saeki**
5. (Canada) **Renata Kolbovic**
6. (Italy) **Rita Grande**
7. (United States) **Ann Grossman**
8. (France) **Nathalie Dechy**

=== Lucky loser ===
1. (Italy) **Francesca Lubiani**

=== Qualifying draw ===
==== First qualifier ====
First round
1	(Austria) Marion Maruska	1	3
**(Germany) Andrea Glass**	**6**	**6**
WC	(Canada) Christina Popescu	2	6
**(Canada) Maureen Drake**	**6**	**7**

Qualifying competition
**(Germany) Andrea Glass**	5	**6**	**6**
(Canada) Maureen Drake	**7**	3	2

==== Second qualifier ====
First round
**(Russia) Tatiana Panova**	**7**	**7**
(Belarus) Olga Barabanschikova	5	5
**(Australia) Siobhan Drake-Brockman**	5
6	(France) Alexia Dechaume-Balleret	1^{r}

Qualifying competition
**(Russia) Tatiana Panova**	**7**	**7**
(Australia) Siobhan Drake-Brockman	5	6

==== Third qualifier ====
First round
3	**(Italy) Francesca Lubiani**	**6**	**6**
(Canada) Martina Nejedly	2	2
**(Canada) Sonya Jeyaseelan**	**6**	**6**
(Argentina) Mercedes Paz	4	0

Qualifying competition
3	(Italy) Francesca Lubiani	**6**	2	5
**(Canada) Sonya Jeyaseelan**	2	**6**	**7**

==== Fourth qualifier ====
First round
**(Australia) Jane Taylor**	3	**6**	**6**
(Canada) Vanessa Webb	**6**	3	1
**(Japan) Miho Saeki**	**6**	**6**
7	(Argentina) Inés Gorrochategui	3	4

Qualifying competition
(Australia) Jane Taylor	2	2
**(Japan) Miho Saeki**	**6**	**6**

==== Fifth qualifier ====
First round
8	(Netherlands) Kristie Boogert	6	2
**(Canada) Renata Kolbovic**	**7**	**6**
WC	(Canada) Sanja Bajin	6	5
**(United States) Tracey Hiete**	**7**	**7**

Qualifying competition
**(Canada) Renata Kolbovic**	**6**	**6**
(United States) Tracey Hiete	3	2

==== Sixth qualifier ====
First round
**(Canada) Jana Nejedly**	**6**	**6**
WC	(Canada) Petia Marinova	0	3
(United States) Kristina Brandi	3	1
4	**(Italy) Rita Grande**	**6**	**6**

Qualifying competition
(Canada) Jana Nejedly	2	1
4	**(Italy) Rita Grande**	**6**	**6**

==== Seventh qualifier ====
First round
5	**(United States) Ann Grossman**	5	**7**	**6**
(United States) Lindsay Lee	**7**	6	4
**(United States) Jolene Watanabe**	**6**	4
(Canada) Rene Simpson	2	1^{r}

Qualifying competition
5	**(United States) Ann Grossman**	2	**6**	**6**
(United States) Jolene Watanabe	**6**	3	4

==== Eighth qualifier ====
First round
WC	(Canada) Susan Huang	1	3
**(United States) Kathy Rinaldi-Stunkel**	**6**	**6**
**(France) Nathalie Dechy**	4	**7**	**6**
2	(Romania) Cătălina Cristea	**6**	6	2

Qualifying competition
(United States) Kathy Rinaldi-Stunkel	4	1
**(France) Nathalie Dechy**	**6**	**6**
