= 1997 du Maurier Open – Men's singles =

Men's singles
- 1997 du Maurier Open

Final
- Champion: (United States) Chris Woodruff
- Runner-up: (Brazil) Gustavo Kuerten
- Score: 7–5, 4–6, 6–3

Details
- Draw: 56 (4WC/7Q)
- Seeds: 16

Events
Singles	men	women
Doubles	men	women
← 1996 ·	Canadian Open	· 1998 →

Chris Woodruff defeated Gustavo Kuerten in the final, 7–5, 4–6, 6–3 to win the men's singles tennis title at the 1997 Canadian Open.

Wayne Ferreira was the defending champion, but lost to Yevgeny Kafelnikov in the third round.

== Seeds ==
A champion seed is indicated in bold text while text in italics indicates the round in which that seed was eliminated. The top eight seeds received a bye to the second round.

1. (United States) Michael Chang (semifinals)
2. (Croatia) Goran Ivanišević (third round)
3. (Austria) Thomas Muster (third round)
4. (Russia) Yevgeny Kafelnikov (semifinals)
5. (Sweden) Thomas Enqvist (quarterfinals)
6. (Brazil) Gustavo Kuerten (final)
7. (Australia) Mark Philippoussis (quarterfinals)
8. (Netherlands) Richard Krajicek (quarterfinals)
9. (Czech Republic) Petr Korda (first round)
10. (United Kingdom) Tim Henman (first round)
11. (Australia) Patrick Rafter (second round)
12. (Sweden) Jonas Björkman (third round)
13. (South Africa) Wayne Ferreira (third round)
14. (United States) Jim Courier (first round)
15. (United States) Alex O'Brien (third round)
16. (Netherlands) Jan Siemerink (second round)

== Draw ==
=== Key ===
- Q = Qualifier
- WC = Wild card
- LL = Lucky loser
- Alt = Alternate
- ITF = ITF entry
- PR = Protected ranking
- SR = Special ranking
- SE = Special exempt
- JE = Junior exempt
- JR = Junior Accelerator Programme entrant
- CO = College Accelerator Programme entrant
- NG = Next Gen Accelerator Program entrant
- w/o = Walkover
- r = Retired
- d = Defaulted

=== Finals ===
Semifinals
1	(United States) Michael Chang	3	1
6	(Brazil) **Gustavo Kuerten**	**6**	**6**
4	(Russia) Yevgeny Kafelnikov	**7**	5	3
(United States) **Chris Woodruff**	5	**7**	**6**

Final
6	(Brazil) Gustavo Kuerten	5	**6**	3
(United States) **Chris Woodruff**	**7**	4	**6**

=== Top half ===
==== Section 1 ====
First round
(Canada) S Lareau	1	5
(Australia) **S Stolle**	**6**	**7**
(South Africa) G Stafford	**6**	5	2
(South Africa) **M Ondruska**	4	**7**	**6**
(France) A Boetsch	1	2
15	(United States) **A O'Brien**	**6**	**6**
9	(Czech Republic) P Korda	4	4
(United States) **J Gimelstob**	**6**	**6**
(Australia) **S Draper**	4	**6**	**6**
(France) T Champion	**6**	1	2
(South Africa) **N Godwin**	**7^{7}**	4	**6**
(Zimbabwe) B Black	6^{2}	**6**	4

Second round
1	(United States) **M Chang**	**6**	**1**
(Australia) S Stolle	1	0	r
(South Africa) M Ondruska	4	6^{7}
15	(United States) **A O'Brien**	**6**	**7^{9}**
(United States) **J Gimelstob**	**6**	**6**
(Australia) S Draper	3	1
(South Africa) N Godwin	6^{3}	1
8	(Netherlands) **R Krajicek**	**7^{7}**	**6**

Third round
1	(United States) **M Chang**	4	**6**	**6**
15	(United States) A O'Brien	**6**	2	3
(United States) J Gimelstob	2	4
8	(Netherlands) **R Krajicek**	**6**	**6**

Quarterfinals
1	(United States) **M Chang**	**7^{7}**	**6**
8	(Netherlands) R Krajicek	6^{5}	4

==== Section 2 ====
First round
Q	(United States) **J Salzenstein**	**6**	**6**
Q	(United States) W McGuire	4	2
(United States) **G Grant**	**7^{11}**	**7^{7}**
(Israel) E Ran	6^{9}	6^{0}
(France) **F Santoro**	**7**	4	**6**
14	(United States) J Courier	5	**6**	4
11	(Australia) **P Rafter**	**6**	**6**
(France) O Delaître	4	1
WC	(Canada) F Niemeyer	6^{5}	3
Q	(Australia) **M Tebbutt**	**7^{7}**	**6**
(Armenia) S Sargsian	**7^{7}**	3	3
(United States) **J Stark**	6^{3}	**6**	**6**

Second round
3	(Austria) **T Muster**	4	**7^{7}**	**6**
Q	(United States) J Salzenstein	**6**	6^{1}	3
(United States) G Grant	2	1
(France) **F Santoro**	**6**	**6**
11	(Australia) P Rafter	**7^{7}**	4	4
Q	(Australia) **M Tebbutt**	6^{4}	**6**	**6**
(United States) J Stark	2	4
6	(Brazil) **G Kuerten**	**6**	**6**

Third round
3	(Austria) T Muster	2	**6**	4
(France) **F Santoro**	**6**	2	**6**
Q	(Australia) M Tebbutt	**7**	4	4
6	(Brazil) **G Kuerten**	5	**6**	**6**

Quarterfinals
(France) F Santoro	3	6^{6}
6	(Brazil) **G Kuerten**	**6**	**7^{8}**

=== Bottom half ===
==== Section 3 ====
First round
(Canada) D Nestor	**7**	4	4
(Germany) **T Haas**	5	**6**	**6**
(United States) **D Flach**	**7^{7}**	**6**
(France) J Golmard	6^{0}	4
WC	(Canada) B Kokavec	3	2
12	(Sweden) **J Björkman**	**6**	**6**
13	(South Africa) **W Ferreira**	**7^{7}**	**6**
(Czech Republic) D Vacek	6^{5}	1
Q	(Italy) **C Caratti**	**6**	**6**
(Czech Republic) M Damm	3	1
(United States) **V Spadea**	3	**6**	**6**
(France) L Roux	**6**	3	1

Second round
5	(Sweden) **T Enqvist**	6^{3}	**6**	**6**
(Germany) T Haas	**7^{7}**	4	4
(United States) D Flach	**7**	3	5
12	(Sweden) **J Björkman**	5	**6**	**7**
13	(South Africa) **W Ferreira**	**6**	**6**
Q	(Italy) C Caratti	1	2
(United States) V Spadea	**6**	3	6^{6}
4	(Russia) **Y Kafelnikov**	4	**6**	**7^{8}**

Third round
5	(Sweden) **T Enqvist**	**6**	**6**
12	(Sweden) J Björkman	3	2
13	(South Africa) W Ferreira	5	3
4	(Russia) **Y Kafelnikov**	**7**	**6**

Quarterfinals
5	(Sweden) T Enqvist	5	**7^{9}**	1
4	(Russia) **Y Kafelnikov**	**7**	6^{7}	**6**

==== Section 4 ====
First round
Q	(Philippines) C Mamiit	1	**6**	5
Q	(United States) **S Campbell**	**6**	4	**7**
(France) **G Raoux**	**6**	**7^{7}**
Q	(France) P Gauthier	3	6^{3}
WC	(Canada) **S Leblanc**	**7^{7}**	4	**6**
10	(United Kingdom) T Henman	6^{3}	**6**	3
16	(Netherlands) **J Siemerink**	**6**	**6**
(India) L Paes	3	4
(United States) **C Woodruff**	**7^{9}**	**6**
WC	(Canada) J Robichaud	6^{7}	3
(Denmark) F Fetterlein	2	0
(New Zealand) **B Steven**	**6**	**6**

Second round
7	(Australia) **M Philippoussis**	**6**	**6**
Q	(United States) S Campbell	2	4
(France) **G Raoux**	**6**	**6**
WC	(Canada) S Leblanc	1	4
16	(Netherlands) J Siemerink	**7^{7}**	5	6^{2}
(United States) **C Woodruff**	6^{4}	**7**	**7^{7}**
(New Zealand) B Steven	3	**7^{10}**	4
2	(Croatia) **G Ivanišević**	**6**	6^{8}	**6**

Third round
7	(Australia) **M Philippoussis**	**7**	**6**
(France) G Raoux	5	3
(United States) **C Woodruff**	**7^{8}**	**6**
2	(Croatia) G Ivanišević	6^{6}	2

Quarterfinals
7	(Australia) M Philippoussis	4	4
(United States) **C Woodruff**	**6**	**6**

== Qualifying ==
=== Qualifying seeds ===
The top seed received a bye to the final round.

1. (United States) **Steve Campbell (qualified)**
2. (Italy) **Cristiano Caratti (qualified)**
3. (United States) **Jeff Salzenstein (qualified)**
4. (Philippines) **Cecil Mamiit (qualified)**
5. (United States) **Wade McGuire (qualified)**
6. (United States) Alex Reichel (qualifying competition)
7. (Australia) **Michael Tebbutt (qualified)**
8. (Switzerland) Lorenzo Manta (qualifying competition)
9. (France) **Pier Gauthier (qualified)**
10. (Belarus) Max Mirnyi (qualifying competition)
11. (Netherlands) Sander Groen (qualifying competition)
12. (Haiti) Ronald Agénor (qualifying competition)
13. (South Africa) Piet Norval (qualifying competition)
14. (North Macedonia) Aleksandar Kitinov (first round)

=== Qualifiers ===
1. (United States) **Steve Campbell**
2. (Italy) **Cristiano Caratti**
3. (United States) **Jeff Salzenstein**
4. (Philippines) **Cecil Mamiit**
5. (United States) **Wade McGuire**
6. (France) **Pier Gauthier**
7. (Australia) **Michael Tebbutt**

=== Qualifying draw ===
==== First qualifier ====
First round				Qualifying competition
				1	**(United States) Steve Campbell**	6	**6**	**6**
					(Canada) Simon Larose	**7**	0	4
	**(Canada) Simon Larose**	**6**	**6**		(Canada) Simon Larose	**7**	0	4
14	(North Macedonia) Aleksandar Kitinov	2	3

==== Second qualifier ====
First round
2	**(Italy) Cristiano Caratti**	**6**	**6**
(Canada) Ryan Clark	2	3
(Canada) Phillipe Sylvestre	2	0
12	**(Haiti) Ronald Agénor**	**6**	**6**

Qualifying competition
2	**(Italy) Cristiano Caratti**	**7**	**7**
12	(Haiti) Ronald Agénor	6	6

==== Third qualifier ====
First round
3	**(United States) Jeff Salzenstein**	**6**	**6**
WC	(Canada) Martin Laurendeau	2	4
(United States) Michael Shyjan	1	0
13	**(South Africa) Piet Norval**	**6**	**6**

Qualifying competition
3	**(United States) Jeff Salzenstein**	6	**6**	**6**
13	(South Africa) Piet Norval	**7**	2	3

==== Fourth qualifier ====
First round
4	**(Philippines) Cecil Mamiit**	**6**	**6**
(Canada) Dominic Boulet	1	3
(Czech Republic) Vojtěch Flégl	0	3
10	**(Belarus) Max Mirnyi**	**6**	**6**

Qualifying competition
4	**(Philippines) Cecil Mamiit**	6	**6**	**6**
10	(Belarus) Max Mirnyi	**7**	4	2

==== Fifth qualifier ====
First round
5	**(United States) Wade McGuire**	**6**	**6**
WC	(Canada) Eric Godin	2	4
(Canada) Hughes Laverdière	**7**	1	1
11	**(Netherlands) Sander Groen**	6	**6**	**6**

Qualifying competition
5	**(United States) Wade McGuire**	**6**	**6**
11	(Netherlands) Sander Groen	3	2

==== Sixth qualifier ====
First round
6	**(United States) Alex Reichel**	4	**6**	**6**
(Canada) Emin Ağayev	**6**	4	4
(United States) Will Ritter	2	4
9	**(France) Pier Gauthier**	**6**	**6**

Qualifying competition
6	(United States) Alex Reichel	4	3
9	**(France) Pier Gauthier**	**6**	**6**

==== Seventh qualifier ====
First round
7	**(Australia) Michael Tebbutt**	**6**	**6**
(Canada) Daniel Larouche	2	3
(Canada) Jean-François Berard	2	6
8	**(Switzerland) Lorenzo Manta**	**6**	**7**

Qualifying competition
7	**(Australia) Michael Tebbutt**	**6**	**6**
8	(Switzerland) Lorenzo Manta	3	3
