= 1997 Great American Insurance ATP Championships =

- Date: August 4–11
- Edition: 96th
- Category: ATP Super 9
- Draw: 56S / 28D
- Prize money: $2,050,000
- Surface: Hard/ outdoor
- Location: Mason, Ohio, U.S.
- Venue: Lindner Family Tennis Center

Champions

Singles
- (United States) Pete Sampras

Doubles
- (Australia) Mark Woodforde / (Australia) Todd Woodbridge
- Cincinnati Masters

The 1997 Cincinnati Open, known by the corporate title of the Great American Insurance ATP Championships was a tennis tournament played on outdoor hard courts. It was the 96th edition of the tournament previously known as the Thriftway ATP Championships, and was part of the ATP Super 9 of the 1997 ATP Tour. It took place in Mason, Ohio, United States, from August 4 through August 11, 1997.

The tournament had previously appeared on the Tier III of the WTA Tour but no event was held from 1989 to 2003.

== Finals ==
=== Singles ===
(United States) Pete Sampras defeated (Austria) Thomas Muster, 6–3, 6–4

- It was Pete Sampras' 5th title of the year and his 49th overall. It was his 1st Masters title of the year and his 8th overall. It was his 2nd title at the event after winning in 1992.

=== Doubles ===
(Australia) Mark Woodforde / (Australia) Todd Woodbridge defeated (Australia) Mark Philippoussis / (Australia) Patrick Rafter 7–6, 4–6, 6–4
