= 1997 Lipton Championships – Women's singles =

Women's singles
- 1997 Lipton Championships

Final
- Champion: (Switzerland) Martina Hingis
- Runner-up: (United States) Monica Seles
- Score: 6–2, 6–1

Details
- Draw: 96
- Seeds: 32

Events
Singles	men	women
Doubles	men	women
← 1996 ·	Lipton Championships	· 1998 →

Martina Hingis defeated Monica Seles in the final, 6–2, 6–1 to win the women's singles tennis title at the 1997 Miami Open. At 16 years and 6 months, Hingis became the youngest-ever world No. 1 player in women's singles. This marked the first time that neither Steffi Graf, Seles nor Arantxa Sánchez Vicario were ranked No. 1 since August 17, 1987.

Steffi Graf was the three-time reigning champion, but did not compete that year.

== Seeds ==
A champion seed is indicated in bold text while text in italics indicates the round in which that seed was eliminated. All thirty-two seeds received a bye to the second round.

1. (Switzerland) **Martina Hingis (champion)**
2. (Spain) Arantxa Sánchez Vicario (fourth round)
3. (Czech Republic) Jana Novotná (semifinals)
4. (United States) Monica Seles (final)
5. (United States) Lindsay Davenport (fourth round)
6. (Germany) Anke Huber (third round)
7. (Romania) Irina Spîrlea (quarterfinals)
8. (Croatia) Iva Majoli (quarterfinals)
9. (Slovakia) Karina Habšudová (second round)
10. (United States) Mary Joe Fernández (quarterfinals)
11. (Austria) Barbara Paulus (semifinals)
12. (South Africa) Amanda Coetzer (second round)
13. (Austria) Judith Wiesner (third round)
14. (United States) Kimberly Po (third round)
15. (Netherlands) Brenda Schultz-McCarthy (second round)
16. (Russia) Elena Likhovtseva (fourth round)
17. (France) Nathalie Tauziat (third round)
18. (Bulgaria) Magdalena Maleeva (third round)
19. (Belgium) Sabine Appelmans (third round)
20. (Romania) Ruxandra Dragomir (third round)
21. (United States) Chanda Rubin (fourth round)
22. (United States) Lisa Raymond (third round)
23. (United States) Jennifer Capriati (second round)
24. (France) Sandrine Testud (quarterfinals)
25. (Japan) Ai Sugiyama (third round)
26. (Belgium) Dominique Van Roost (second round)
27. (United States) Amy Frazier (third round)
28. (United States) Linda Wild (second round)
29. (Slovakia) Katarína Studeníková (third round)
30. (Sweden) Åsa Carlsson (fourth round)
31. (Slovakia) Henrieta Nagyová (third round)
32. (Austria) Barbara Schett (fourth round)

== Draw ==
=== Key ===
- Q = Qualifier
- WC = Wild card
- LL = Lucky loser
- Alt = Alternate
- SE = Special exempt
- PR = Protected ranking
- ITF = ITF entry
- JE = Junior exempt
- w/o = Walkover
- r = Retired
- d = Defaulted
- SR = Special ranking

=== Finals ===
Quarterfinals
1	(Switzerland) Martina Hingis	6	6
10	(United States) Mary Joe Fernández	4	1
3	(Czech Republic) Jana Novotná	6	3	7^{9}
8	(Croatia) Iva Majoli	2	6	6^{7}
7	(Romania) Irina Spîrlea	6	2	3
4	(United States) Monica Seles	3	6	6
11	(Austria) Barbara Paulus	6	6
24	(France) Sandrine Testud	3	3

Semifinals
1	(Switzerland) Martina Hingis	6	2	6
3	(Czech Republic) Jana Novotná	3	6	4
4	(United States) Monica Seles	6	6
11	(Austria) Barbara Paulus	1	0

Final
1	(Switzerland) Martina Hingis	6	6
4	(United States) Monica Seles	2	1

=== Top half ===
==== Section 1 ====
First round
(France) N Dechy	2	4
(Canada) P Hy-Boulais	6	6
WC	(United States) V Williams	6	4	6
(United States) G Helgeson-Nielsen	1	6	3
(Argentina) I Gorrochategui	6	7^{8}
WC	(United States) B Rippner	4	6^{6}
WC	(United States) J Watanabe	2	6	6
Q	(Spain) Á Montolio	6	3	2

Second round
1	(Switzerland) M Hingis	3	6	6
(Canada) P Hy-Boulais	6	3	2
WC	(United States) V Williams	7^{7}	3	6
23	(United States) J Capriati	6^{5}	6	2
20	(Romania) R Dragomir	2	6	7^{8}
(Argentina) I Gorrochategui	6	3	6^{6}
WC	(United States) J Watanabe	2	0
16	(Russia) E Likhovtseva	6	6

Third round
1	(Switzerland) M Hingis	6	6
WC	(United States) V Williams	4	2
20	(Romania) R Dragomir	7^{7}	4	5
16	(Russia) E Likhovtseva	6^{5}	6	7

Fourth round
1	(Switzerland) M Hingis	6	2	6
16	(Russia) E Likhovtseva	3	6	3

==== Section 2 ====
First round
(Czech Republic) D Chládková	2	1
(Australia) A Ellwood	6	6
WC	(United States) L Lee	6	6
(Romania) C Cristea	3	4
WC	(United States) C Morariu	1	6^{4}
Q	(Poland) M Grzybowska	6	7^{7}
(Argentina) P Suárez	1	4
(France) A-G Sidot	6	6

Second round
10	(United States) M J Fernández	6	6
(Australia) A Ellwood	4	4
WC	(United States) L Lee	3	3
18	(Bulgaria) M Maleeva	6	6
28	(United States) L Wild	3	3
Q	(Poland) M Grzybowska	6	6
(France) A-G Sidot	4	2
5	(United States) L Davenport	6	6

Third round
10	(United States) M J Fernández	3	6	6
18	(Bulgaria) M Maleeva	6	2	4
Q	(Poland) M Grzybowska	2	0
5	(United States) L Davenport	6	6

Fourth round
10	(United States) M J Fernández	6	6
5	(United States) L Davenport	2	4

==== Section 3 ====
First round
(Italy) R Grande	6	1	3
Q	(Japan) M Saeki	0	6	6
(Japan) R Hiraki	4	6	6
(Japan) M Endo	6	4	3
(Italy) G Pizzichini	4	4
(Thailand) T Tanasugarn	6	6
(Russia) A Kournikova	6	6
(Japan) N Miyagi	2	0

Second round
3	(Czech Republic) J Novotná	4	6	6
Q	(Japan) M Saeki	6	3	3
(Japan) R Hiraki	3	6	2
27	(United States) L Raymond	6	4	6
29	(Slovakia) K Studeníková	6	6
(Thailand) T Tanasugarn	0	2
(Russia) A Kournikova	6	3	6
12	(South Africa) A Coetzer	1	6	3

Third round
3	(Czech Republic) J Novotná	6	6
27	(United States) L Raymond	2	1
29	(Slovakia) K Studeníková	6	4	0
(Russia) A Kournikova	1	6	6

Fourth round
3	(Czech Republic) J Novotná	6	6
(Russia) A Kournikova	3	4

==== Section 4 ====
First round
(Argentina) F Labat	6	6
(South Africa) M de Swardt	2	3
WC	(United States) K Brandi	3	3
Q	(Spain) M Serna	6	6
(Czech Republic) H Suková	3	4
(France) A Dechaume-Balleret	6	6
(Chinese Taipei) S-T Wang	6	6
(Slovakia) R Zrubáková	3	4

Second round
14	(United States) K Po	6	6
(Argentina) F Labat	4	0
Q	(Spain) M Serna	3	3
32	(Austria) B Schett	6	6
25	(Japan) A Sugiyama	6	6
(France) A Dechaume-Balleret	0	1
(Chinese Taipei) S-T Wang	4	6	6^{3}
8	(Croatia) I Majoli	6	1	7^{7}

Third round
14	(United States) K Po	3	5
32	(Austria) B Schett	6	7
25	(Japan) A Sugiyama	3	6	3
8	(Croatia) I Majoli	6	3	6

Fourth round
32	(Austria) B Schett	2	6	2
8	(Croatia) I Majoli	6	4	6

=== Bottom half ===
==== Section 5 ====
First round
(Italy) F Perfetti	6	4	6
WC	(United States) M Shaughnessy	0	6	3
(Czech Republic) S Kleinová	6^{3}	6^{2}
(Germany) P Begerow	7^{7}	7^{7}
(Austria) K Kschwendt	3	1
(United States) A Grossman	6	6
Q	(Spain) M Sánchez Lorenzo	1	3
(Belgium) E Callens	6	6

Second round
7	(Romania) I Spîrlea	6	6
(Italy) F Perfetti	2	0
(Germany) P Begerow	2	5
19	(Belgium) S Appelmans	6	7
21	(United States) C Rubin	6	6
(United States) A Grossman	2	0
(Belgium) E Callens	2	3
13	(Austria) J Wiesner	6	6

Third round
7	(Romania) I Spîrlea	2	6	6
19	(Belgium) S Appelmans	6	2	3
21	(United States) C Rubin	3	6	7
13	(Austria) J Wiesner	6	3	5

Fourth round
7	(Romania) I Spîrlea	1	7^{7}	7^{7}
21	(United States) C Rubin	6	6^{2}	6^{4}

==== Section 6 ====
First round
(Czech Republic) P Langrová	4	0
(Belarus) N Zvereva	6	6
WC	(United States) M Tu	7	6
(United States) A Miller	5	1
(Belgium) S Devillé	3	1
(Germany) B Rittner	6	6
(Japan) N Sawamatsu	4	6	6
(Italy) S Farina	6	1	2

Second round
9	(Slovakia) K Habšudová	4	3
(Belarus) N Zvereva	6	6
WC	(United States) M Tu	7	1	4
30	(Sweden) Å Carlsson	5	6	6
27	(United States) A Frazier	6	6
(Germany) B Rittner	4	3
(Japan) N Sawamatsu	3	6	2
4	(United States) M Seles	6	2	6

Third round
(Belarus) N Zvereva	4	6	1
30	(Sweden) Å Carlsson	6	1	6
27	(United States) A Frazier	3	3
4	(United States) M Seles	6	6

Fourth round
30	(Sweden) Å Carlsson	2	1
4	(United States) M Seles	6	6

==== Section 7 ====
First round
(Netherlands) M Oremans	4	4
WC	(United States) L McNeil	6	6
(France) A Fusai	6	5	6
(Austria) M Maruska	4	7	3
(Latvia) L Neiland	6	7
(Czech Republic) L Richterová	3	5
(Germany) E Wagner	2	6	6
(United States) T Whitlinger-Jones	6	4	3

Second round
6	(Germany) A Huber	6	6
WC	(United States) L McNeil	3	3
(France) A Fusai	6	7^{7}
26	(Belgium) D Van Roost	4	6^{4}
17	(France) N Tauziat	4	7^{9}	6
(Latvia) L Neiland	6	6^{7}	4
(Germany) E Wagner	1	3
11	(Austria) B Paulus	6	6

Third round
6	(Germany) A Huber	6^{1}	3
(France) A Fusai	7^{7}	6
17	(France) N Tauziat	1	7^{7}	1
11	(Austria) B Paulus	6	6^{5}	6

Fourth round
(France) A Fusai	1	6	1
11	(Austria) B Paulus	6	2	6

==== Section 8 ====
First round
Q	(Russia) T Panova	7^{7}	6
Q	(Madagascar) D Randriantefy	6^{4}	3
(Switzerland) P Schnyder	6	6
(Czech Republic) A Gerši	1	3
Q	(United Kingdom) S Smith	7^{9}	1	5
(Germany) J Kandarr	6^{7}	6	7
(Russia) E Makarova	5	1
(Japan) N Kijimuta	7	6

Second round
15	(Netherlands) B Schultz-McCarthy	6	6^{2}	4
Q	(Russia) T Panova	1	7^{7}	6
(Switzerland) P Schnyder	4	4
24	(France) S Testud	6	6
31	(Slovakia) H Nagyová	7^{7}	6
(Germany) J Kandarr	6^{2}	0
(Russia) E Makarova	6	3	2
2	(Spain) A Sánchez Vicario	4	6	6

Third round
Q	(Russia) T Panova	6^{4}	1
24	(France) S Testud	7^{7}	6
31	(Slovakia) H Nagyová	5	6	4
2	(Spain) A Sánchez Vicario	7	4	6

Fourth round
24	(France) S Testud	6	7
2	(Spain) A Sánchez Vicario	0	5
