= 1997 Lipton Championships – Men's singles =

Men's singles
- 1997 Lipton Championships

Final
- Champion: (Austria) Thomas Muster
- Runner-up: (Spain) Sergi Bruguera
- Score: 7–6^{(8–6)}, 6–3, 6–1

Details
- Draw: 96 (12Q / 2LL) / 6WC)
- Seeds: 32

Events
| Singles | men | women |
| Doubles | men | women |
| ← 1996 · | Miami Open | · 1998 → |

Thomas Muster defeated Sergi Bruguera in the final, 7–6^{(8–6)}, 6–3, 6–1 to win the men's singles tennis title at the 1997 Miami Open.

Andre Agassi was the two-time defending champion, but lost in the second round to Scott Draper.

== Seeds ==
All thirty-two seeds received a bye to the second round.

1. (United States) Pete Sampras (semifinals)
2. (Austria) Thomas Muster (champion)
3. (United States) Michael Chang (third round)
4. (Croatia) Goran Ivanišević (quarterfinals)
5. (Netherlands) Richard Krajicek (fourth round)
6. (Sweden) Thomas Enqvist (second round)
7. (Spain) Carlos Moyá (third round)
8. (Chile) Marcelo Ríos (third round)
9. (South Africa) Wayne Ferreira (third round)
10. (Germany) ~~Boris Becker~~ (withdrew)
11. (Spain) Albert Costa (third round)
12. (United States) Andre Agassi (second round)
13. (Spain) Félix Mantilla (second round)
14. (United Kingdom) Tim Henman (second round)
15. (Switzerland) Marc Rosset (second round)
16. (Spain) Alberto Berasategui (second round)
17. (Netherlands) Jan Siemerink (second round)
18. (Spain) Àlex Corretja (fourth round)
19. (United States) Richey Reneberg (second round, retired)
20. (United States) ~~MaliVai Washington~~ (withdrew)
21. (Czech Republic) Petr Korda (second round)
22. (United States) Jim Courier (semifinals)
23. (Czech Republic) Bohdan Ulihrach (second round)
24. (Australia) Mark Philippoussis (fourth round)
25. (Sweden) Jonas Björkman (quarterfinals)
26. (Australia) Todd Woodbridge (second round)
27. (France) Arnaud Boetsch (third round)
28. (France) Cédric Pioline (second round)
29. (United States) Alex O'Brien (second round)
30. (Spain) Sergi Bruguera (final)
31. (Spain) Francisco Clavet (third round)
32. (Spain) Javier Sánchez (second round)

== Draw ==
=== Key ===
- Q = Qualifier
- WC = Wild card
- LL = Lucky loser
- Alt = Alternate
- SE = Special exempt
- PR = Protected ranking
- ITF = ITF entry
- JE = Junior exempt
- w/o = Walkover
- r = Retired
- d = Defaulted
- SR = Special ranking

=== Finals ===
Quarterfinals
1 | (United States) Pete Sampras | w/o
(Germany) Hendrik Dreekmann
30 | (Spain) Sergi Bruguera | 6 | 6
(Ukraine) Andriy Medvedev | 0 | 3
22 | (United States) Jim Courier | 6 | 7^{7}
4 | (Croatia) Goran Ivanišević | 2 | 6^{2}
25 | (Sweden) Jonas Björkman | 5 | 2
2 | (Austria) Thomas Muster | 7 | 6

Semifinals
1 | (United States) Pete Sampras | 7 | 6^{2} | 4
30 | (Spain) Sergi Bruguera | 5 | 7^{7} | 6
22 | (United States) Jim Courier | 3 | 4
2 | (Austria) Thomas Muster | 6 | 6

Final
30 | (Spain) Sergi Bruguera | 6^{6} | 3 | 1
2 | (Austria) Thomas Muster | 7^{8} | 6 | 6

=== Top half ===
==== Section 1 ====
First round
(Argentina) M Zabaleta | 7 | 5 | 6^{d}
(Romania) A Voinea | 5 | 7 | 6
WC | (Germany) N Kiefer | 6 | 5 | 7^{7}
(Netherlands) D van Scheppingen | 2 | 7 | 6^{3}
(Netherlands) P Haarhuis | 5 | 6 | 5
(Sweden) M Larsson | 7 | 0 | 7
Q | (United States) D Flach | 6^{1} | 6 | 2
(Czech Republic) C Doseděl | 7^{7} | 2 | 6

Second round
1 | (United States) P Sampras | 6 | 6
(Romania) A Voinea | 2 | 0
WC | (Germany) N Kiefer | 2 | 3
31 | (Spain) F Clavet | 6 | 6
17 | (Netherlands) J Siemerink | 1 | 3
(Sweden) M Larsson | 6 | 6
(Czech Republic) C Doseděl | 5 | 6 | 7
15 | (Switzerland) M Rosset | 7 | 2 | 5

Third round
1 | (United States) P Sampras | 6 | 7^{7}
31 | (Spain) F Clavet | 3 | 6^{3}
(Sweden) M Larsson | 5 | 7 | 6
(Czech Republic) C Doseděl | 7 | 5 | 3

Fourth round
1 | (United States) P Sampras | 6 | 6
(Sweden) M Larsson | 2 | 0

==== Section 2 ====
First round
(Uruguay) M Filippini | 4 | 4
(Germany) H Dreekmann | 6 | 6
(United States) M Joyce | 1 | 6 | 3
(Brazil) G Kuerten | 6 | 4 | 6
(France) L Roux | 6^{6} | 1
(Sweden) M Tillström | 7^{8} | 6
WC | (United States) J Gimelstob | 6^{6} | 6 | 4
Q | (Argentina) M Charpentier | 7^{8} | 3 | 6

Second round
LL | (Argentina) L Arnold | 1 | 1
(Germany) H Dreekmann | 6 | 6
(Brazil) G Kuerten | 7^{10} | 6
23 | (Czech Republic) B Ulihrach | 6^{8} | 3
26 | (Australia) T Woodbridge | 6^{2} | 7 | 4
(Sweden) M Tillström | 7^{7} | 5 | 6
Q | (Argentina) M Charpentier | 6^{4} | 4
7 | (Spain) C Moyá | 7^{7} | 6

Third round
(Germany) H Dreekmann | 7^{7} | 3 | 7^{7}
(Brazil) G Kuerten | 6^{5} | 6 | 6^{3}
(Sweden) M Tillström | 6 | 3 | 6
7 | (Spain) C Moyá | 4 | 6 | 3

Fourth round
(Germany) H Dreekmann | 6 | 6
(Sweden) M Tillström | 3 | 4

==== Section 3 ====
First round
Q | (United States) M Merklein | 2 | 6 | 6
(South Africa) N Godwin | 6 | 4 | 4
(Australia) J Stoltenberg | 6 | 6
Q | (United States) J Grabb | 3 | 2
(Spain) G Blanco | 4 | 4
Q | (Argentina) G Etlis | 6 | 6
Q | (Spain) J Alonso | 6 | 6
Q | (United States) S Bryan | 4 | 0

Second round
3 | (United States) M Chang | 6 | 7^{7}
Q | (United States) M Merklein | 3 | 6^{4}
(Australia) J Stoltenberg | 3 | 6 | 5
30 | (Spain) S Bruguera | 6 | 3 | 7
19 | (United States) R Reneberg | 4 | r
Q | (Argentina) G Etlis | 6
Q | (Spain) J Alonso | 6^{4} | 6 | 6
14 | (United Kingdom) T Henman | 7^{7} | 2 | 3

Third round
3 | (United States) M Chang | 4 | 3
30 | (Spain) S Bruguera | 6 | 6
Q | (Argentina) G Etlis | 7^{7} | 7^{9}
Q | (Spain) J Alonso | 6^{2} | 6^{7}

Fourth round
30 | (Spain) S Bruguera | 7^{7} | 6
Q | (Argentina) G Etlis | 6^{0} | 4

==== Section 4 ====
First round
WC | (Belgium) F Dewulf | 7^{7} | 6
Q | (Mexico) A Hernández | 6^{3} | 1
(Norway) C Ruud | 4 | 4
(Ukraine) A Medvedev | 6 | 6
(Sweden) N Kulti | 6 | 6
WC | (South Africa) M Ondruska | 0 | 2
WC | (Canada) D Nestor | 6 | 0 | 6
(United States) J Stark | 3 | 6 | 3

Second round
11 | (Spain) A Costa | 6 | 6
WC | (Belgium) F Dewulf | 3 | 2
(Ukraine) A Medvedev | 6 | 6^{2} | 7^{7}
21 | (Czech Republic) P Korda | 2 | 7^{7} | 6^{3}
28 | (France) C Pioline | 6 | 4 | 6^{8}
(Sweden) N Kulti | 2 | 6 | 7^{10}
WC | (Canada) D Nestor | 7^{11} | 6
6 | (Sweden) T Enqvist | 6^{9} | 3

Third round
11 | (Spain) A Costa | 3 | 6 | 6^{2}
(Ukraine) A Medvedev | 6 | 3 | 7^{7}
(Sweden) N Kulti | 6 | 7
WC | (Canada) D Nestor | 4 | 5

Fourth round
(Ukraine) A Medvedev | 4 | 6 | 7
(Sweden) N Kulti | 6 | 3 | 5

=== Bottom half ===
==== Section 5 ====
First round
(Australia) P Rafter | 4 | 4
(Argentina) H Gumy | 6 | 6
(Germany) M-K Goellner | 6 | 2 | 3
(Brazil) F Meligeni | 4 | 6 | 6
(Australia) S Stolle | 6 | 6^{0} | 7
(Spain) M A Gorriz | 0 | 7^{7} | 5
(Australia) S Draper | 6 | 7^{7}
(Netherlands) S Schalken | 3 | 6^{5}

Second round
5 | (Netherlands) R Krajicek | 7 | 7^{7}
(Argentina) H Gumy | 5 | 6^{4}
(Brazil) F Meligeni | 4 | 3
27 | (France) A Boetsch | 6 | 6
22 | (United States) J Courier | 6 | 6
(Australia) S Stolle | 2 | 2
(Australia) S Draper | 7^{7} | 6
12 | (United States) A Agassi | 6^{5} | 1

Third round
5 | (Netherlands) R Krajicek | 6 | 7
27 | (France) A Boetsch | 3 | 5
22 | (United States) J Courier | 4 | 6 | 6
(Australia) S Draper | 6 | 1 | 4

Fourth round
5 | (Netherlands) R Krajicek | 6^{6} | 4
22 | (United States) J Courier | 7^{8} | 6

==== Section 6 ====
First round
(France) T Champion | 7^{7} | 5 | 3
(Slovakia) D Hrbatý | 6^{3} | 7 | 6
(Germany) A Rădulescu | 4 | 4
(United States) C Woodruff | 6 | 6
(United States) V Spadea | 4 | 6 | 6
Q | (Argentina) J Frana | 6 | 3 | 4
(Italy) A Gaudenzi | 2 | 3
(Zimbabwe) B Black | 6 | 6

Second round
13 | (Spain) F Mantilla | 4 | 4
(Slovakia) D Hrbatý | 6 | 6
(United States) C Woodruff | 6 | 6
LL | (Ecuador) N Lapentti | 4 | 3
29 | (United States) A O'Brien | 6^{4} | 5
(United States) V Spadea | 7^{7} | 7
(Zimbabwe) B Black | 3 | 3
4 | (Croatia) G Ivanišević | 6 | 6

Third round
(Slovakia) D Hrbatý | 6 | 6
(United States) C Woodruff | 3 | 2
(United States) V Spadea | 6 | 6^{4} | 4
4 | (Croatia) G Ivanišević | 3 | 7^{7} | 6

Fourth round
(Slovakia) D Hrbatý | 4 | 4
4 | (Croatia) G Ivanišević | 6 | 6

==== Section 7 ====
First round
(Armenia) S Sargsian | 2 | 5
(United States) J Tarango | 6 | 7
(Belgium) J van Herck | 7^{7} | 3 | 4
Q | (United States) J Salzenstein | 6^{5} | 6 | 6
(Czech Republic) M Damm | 6 | 5 | 6
(Spain) C Costa | 1 | 7 | 4
(Spain) J A Viloca | 0 | 3
(Czech Republic) J Novák | 6 | 6

Second round
8 | (Chile) M Ríos | 7 | 6
(United States) J Tarango | 5 | 2
Q | (United States) J Salzenstein | 2 | 3
25 | (Sweden) J Björkman | 6 | 6
24 | (Australia) M Philippoussis | 7 | 7^{7}
(Czech Republic) M Damm | 5 | 6^{4}
(Czech Republic) J Novák | 4 | 2
9 | (South Africa) W Ferreira | 6 | 6

Third round
8 | (Chile) M Ríos | 3 | 6 | 1
25 | (Sweden) J Björkman | 6 | 3 | 6
24 | (Australia) M Philippoussis | 6 | 6
9 | (South Africa) W Ferreira | 3 | 3

Fourth round
25 | (Sweden) J Björkman | 6 | 6
24 | (Australia) M Philippoussis | 3 | 4

==== Section 8 ====
First round
Q | (Canada) S Lareau | 6 | 6
(Australia) M Woodforde | 2 | 4
Q | (France) J Golmard | 6 | 6
(France) G Raoux | 2 | 3
(France) G Forget | 6^{3} | 5
WC | (Germany) T Haas | 7^{7} | 7
(India) L Paes | 6^{4} | 6^{5}
(South Africa) G Stafford | 7^{7} | 7^{7}

Second round
16 | (Spain) A Berasategui | 2 | 6^{4}
Q | (Canada) S Lareau | 6 | 7^{7}
Q | (France) J Golmard | 5 | 3
18 | (Spain) À Corretja | 7 | 6
32 | (Spain) J Sánchez | 6 | 2 | 1
WC | (Germany) T Haas | 4 | 6 | 6
(South Africa) G Stafford | 4 | 6 | 1
2 | (Austria) T Muster | 6 | 2 | 6

Third round
Q | (Canada) S Lareau | 1 | 5
18 | (Spain) À Corretja | 6 | 7
WC | (Germany) T Haas | 1 | 2
2 | (Austria) T Muster | 6 | 6

Fourth round
18 | (Spain) À Corretja | 4 | 4
2 | (Austria) T Muster | 6 | 6

== Qualifying ==
=== Qualifying seeds ===
1. (France) Jérôme Golmard (qualified)
2. (Argentina) Javier Frana (qualified)
3. (United States) Doug Flach (qualified)
4. (Canada) Sébastien Lareau (qualified)
5. (Argentina) Lucas Arnold (qualifying competition, Lucky loser)
6. (Ecuador) Nicolás Lapentti (qualifying competition, Lucky loser)
7. (Argentina) Marcelo Charpentier (qualified)
8. (Mexico) Alejandro Hernández (qualified)
9. (Brazil) Jaime Oncins (qualifying competition)
10. (United States) Steve Bryan (qualified)
11. (Germany) Dirk Dier (first round)
12. (Argentina) Gastón Etlis (qualified)
13. (Argentina) Guillermo Cañas (first round)
14. (Brazil) Roberto Jabali (qualifying competition)
15. (France) Jean-Philippe Fleurian (first round)
16. (Venezuela) Jimy Szymanski (first round)
17. (Romania) Răzvan Sabău (qualifying competition)
18. (The Bahamas) Mark Knowles (first round)
19. (Japan) Shuzo Matsuoka (first round)
20. (Mexico) Luis Herrera (first round)
21. (Chile) Gabriel Silberstein (qualifying competition)
22. (South Africa) David Nainkin (qualifying competition)
23. (United States) Bryan Shelton (qualifying competition)
24. (France) Gérard Solvès (first round)

=== Qualifiers ===
1. (France) Jérôme Golmard
2. (Argentina) Javier Frana
3. (United States) Doug Flach
4. (Canada) Sébastien Lareau
5. (United States) Mark Merklein
6. (United States) Jeff Salzenstein
7. (Argentina) Marcelo Charpentier
8. (Mexico) Alejandro Hernández
9. (Spain) Julián Alonso
10. (United States) Steve Bryan
11. (United States) Jim Grabb
12. (Argentina) Gastón Etlis

=== Lucky losers ===
1. (Argentina) Lucas Arnold
2. (Ecuador) Nicolás Lapentti

=== Qualifying draw ===
==== First qualifier ====
First round
1 | (France) Jérôme Golmard | 6 | 6
(Hungary) Attila Sávolt | 3 | 2
(Argentina) Daniel Orsanic | 6 | 3 | 3
23 | (United States) Bryan Shelton | 3 | 6 | 6

Qualifying competition
1 | (France) Jérôme Golmard | 6 | 6
23 | (United States) Bryan Shelton | 4 | 4

==== Second qualifier ====
First round
2 | (Argentina) Javier Frana | 7 | 6
(Australia) Michael Tebbutt | 6 | 3
(Philippines) Cecil Mamiit | 6 | 6
24 | (France) Gérard Solvès | 3 | 2

Qualifying competition
2 | (Argentina) Javier Frana | 6 | 3 | 6
(Philippines) Cecil Mamiit | 2 | 6 | 3

==== Third qualifier ====
First round
3 | (United States) Doug Flach | 6 | 6
(United Kingdom) Mark Petchey | 1 | 2
(United States) Oren Motevassel | 4 | 6 | 4
22 | (South Africa) David Nainkin | 6 | 3 | 6

Qualifying competition
3 | (United States) Doug Flach | 6 | 6
22 | (South Africa) David Nainkin | 4 | 2

==== Fourth qualifier ====
First round
4 | (Canada) Sébastien Lareau | 6 | 6
(Germany) Rainer Schüttler | 4 | 3
(Netherlands) Martijn Bok | 1 | 4
21 | (Chile) Gabriel Silberstein | 6 | 6

Qualifying competition
4 | (Canada) Sébastien Lareau | 6 | 6
21 | (Chile) Gabriel Silberstein | 2 | 3

==== Fifth qualifier ====
First round
5 | (Argentina) Lucas Arnold | 7 | 6
(Czech Republic) David Rikl | 6 | 3
(United States) Mark Merklein | 6 | 6 | 7
19 | (Japan) Shuzo Matsuoka | 3 | 7 | 6

Qualifying competition
5 | (Argentina) Lucas Arnold | 6 | 6 | 2
(United States) Mark Merklein | 3 | 7 | 6

==== Sixth qualifier ====
First round
6 | (Ecuador) Nicolás Lapentti | 6 | 7 | 6
(Canada) Albert Chang | 7 | 6 | 4
(United States) Jeff Salzenstein | 6 | 3 | 6
20 | (Mexico) Luis Herrera | 4 | 6 | 2

Qualifying competition
6 | (Ecuador) Nicolás Lapentti | 3 | 6
(United States) Jeff Salzenstein | 6 | 7

==== Seventh qualifier ====
First round
7 | (Argentina) Marcelo Charpentier | 6 | 6
WC | (Federal Republic of Yugoslavia) Bojan Vujić | 2 | 2
(Austria) Stefan Koubek | 0 | 4
17 | (Romania) Răzvan Sabău | 6 | 6

Qualifying competition
7 | (Argentina) Marcelo Charpentier | 4 | 6 | 6
17 | (Romania) Răzvan Sabău | 6 | 4 | 4

==== Eighth qualifier ====
First round
8 | (Mexico) Alejandro Hernández | 6 | 4 | 6
WC | (United States) Scott Humphries | 4 | 6 | 2
(United States) Steve Campbell | 6 | 6 | 7
18 | (The Bahamas) Mark Knowles | 3 | 7 | 6

Qualifying competition
8 | (Mexico) Alejandro Hernández | 2 | 6 | 6
(United States) Steve Campbell | 6 | 2 | 2

==== Ninth qualifier ====
First round
9 | (Brazil) Jaime Oncins | 7 | 6
(Italy) Nicola Bruno | 6 | 0
(Spain) Julián Alonso | 2 | 7 | 6
15 | (France) Jean-Philippe Fleurian | 6 | 6 | 2

Qualifying competition
9 | (Brazil) Jaime Oncins | 6 | 6 | 1
(Spain) Julián Alonso | 4 | 7 | 6

==== Tenth qualifier ====
First round
10 | (United States) Steve Bryan | 6 | 7
(Italy) Mosé Navarra | 3 | 6
(South Africa) Chris Haggard | 5 | 6 | 6
16 | (Venezuela) Jimy Szymanski | 7 | 4 | 2

Qualifying competition
10 | (United States) Steve Bryan | 6 | 6
(South Africa) Chris Haggard | 3 | 2

==== Eleventh qualifier ====
First round
11 | (Germany) Dirk Dier | 6 | 6 | 6
(United States) Jim Grabb | 3 | 7 | 7
(Ecuador) Luis Morejón | 0 | 6 | 6
13 | (Argentina) Guillermo Cañas | 6 | 3 | 3

Qualifying competition
(United States) Jim Grabb | 7 | 7
(Ecuador) Luis Morejón | 6 | 6

==== Twelfth qualifier ====
First round
12 | (Argentina) Gastón Etlis | 6 | 6
(Australia) Grant Doyle | 4 | 4
(Australia) Ben Ellwood | 4 | 3
14 | (Brazil) Roberto Jabali | 6 | 6

Qualifying competition
12 | (Argentina) Gastón Etlis | 6 | 6
14 | (Brazil) Roberto Jabali | 4 | 1
