= 1997 Lipton Championships =

- Date: March 20–30
- Edition: 13th
- Surface: Hard / outdoor
- Location: Key Biscayne, Florida, U.S.
- Venue: Tennis Center at Crandon Park

Champions

Men's singles
- (Austria) Thomas Muster

Women's singles
- (Switzerland) Martina Hingis

Men's doubles
- (Australia) Todd Woodbridge / (Australia) Mark Woodforde

Women's doubles
- (Spain) Arantxa Sánchez Vicario / (Belarus) Natasha Zvereva
- Miami Open

The 1997 Lipton Championships was a tennis tournament played on outdoor hard courts. It was the 13th edition of the Miami Masters and was part of the Mercedes Super 9 of the 1997 ATP Tour and of Tier I of the 1997 WTA Tour. Both the men's and women's events took place at the Tennis Center at Crandon Park in Miami, Florida in the United States from March 20 through March 30, 1997.

== Finals ==
=== Men's singles ===
(Austria) Thomas Muster defeated (Spain) Sergi Bruguera 7–6^{(8–6)}, 6–3, 6–1

- It was Muster's 2nd title of the year and the 45th of his career. It was his 1st Masters title of the year and his 8th overall.

=== Women's singles ===
(Switzerland) Martina Hingis defeated (United States) Monica Seles 6–2, 6–1

- It was Hingis' 7th title of the year and the 12th of her career. It was her 2nd Tier I title of the year and her 2nd overall.

=== Men's doubles ===
(Australia) Todd Woodbridge / (Australia) Mark Woodforde defeated (The Bahamas) Mark Knowles / (Canada) Daniel Nestor 7–6, 7–6

- It was Woodbridge's 3rd title of the year and the 55th of his career. It was Woodforde's 2nd title of the year and the 58th of his career.

=== Women's doubles ===
(Spain) Arantxa Sánchez Vicario / (Belarus) Natasha Zvereva defeated (Belgium) Sabine Appelmans / (Netherlands) Miriam Oremans 6–2, 6–3

- It was Sánchez Vicario's 2nd title of the year and the 75th of her career. It was Zvereva's 4th title of the year and the 66th of her career.
