= 1997 du Maurier Open =

- Date: July 28 – August 4 (men); August 11–17 (women)
- Edition: 108th
- Surface: Hard / outdoor

Champions

Men's singles
- (United States) Chris Woodruff

Women's singles
- (United States) Monica Seles

Men's doubles
- (India) Mahesh Bhupathi / (India) Leander Paes

Women's doubles
- (Indonesia) Yayuk Basuki / (Netherlands) Caroline Vis
- Canadian Open

The 1997 Canadian Open (also known as the du Maurier Open for sponsorship reasons) was a tennis tournament played on outdoor hard courts. It was the 108th edition of the Canada Masters and was part of the ATP Super 9 of the 1997 ATP Tour and of Tier I of the 1997 WTA Tour. The men's event took place at the du Maurier Stadium in Montreal, Quebec, Canada from July 28 through August 4, 1997, while the women's event took place at the National Tennis Centre in Toronto, Ontario, Canada from August 11 through August 17, 1997. Chris Woodruff and Monica Seles won the singles titles. It was Seles' first Tier I title of the year and her seventh overall. It was her third consecutive title at the event after winning in 1995 and 1996.

== Finals ==
=== Men's singles ===
(United States) Chris Woodruff defeated (Brazil) Gustavo Kuerten 7–5, 4–6, 6–3

- It was Woodruff's only title of the year and the 1st of his career.

=== Women's singles ===
(United States) Monica Seles defeated (Germany) Anke Huber 6–2, 6–4

- It was Seles' 2nd title of the year and the 44th of her career.

=== Men's doubles ===
(India) Mahesh Bhupathi / (India) Leander Paes defeated (Canada) Sébastien Lareau / (United States) Alex O'Brien 7–6, 6–3

- It was Bhupathi's 3rd title of the year and the 3rd of his career. It was Paes' 3rd title of the year and the 3rd of his career.

=== Women's doubles ===
(Indonesia) Yayuk Basuki / (Netherlands) Caroline Vis defeated (United States) Nicole Arendt / (Netherlands) Manon Bollegraf 3–6, 7–5, 6–4

- It was Basuki's 2nd title of the year and the 13th of her career. It was Vis' 2nd title of the year and the 4th of her career.
