= 1996 Bausch & Lomb Championships – Singles =

Singles
- 1996 Bausch & Lomb Championships
- 1995 Champion: (Spain) Conchita Martínez

Final
- Champion: (Romania) Irina Spîrlea
- Runner-up: (France) Mary Pierce
- Score: 6–7, 6–4, 6–3

Details
- Draw: 56 (8 Q / 3 WC )
- Seeds: 16

Events
Singles	Doubles
← 1995 ·	Amelia Island Championships	· 1997 →

Conchita Martínez was the defending champion but lost in the quarterfinals to Mary Pierce.

Irina Spîrlea won in the final 6–7, 6–4, 6–3 against Pierce.

== Seeds ==
A champion seed is indicated in bold text while text in italics indicates the round in which that seed was eliminated. The top eight seeds received a bye to the second round.

1. (Spain) Conchita Martínez (quarterfinals)
2. (Spain) Arantxa Sánchez Vicario (semifinals)
3. (Bulgaria) Magdalena Maleeva (second round)
4. (United States) Chanda Rubin (third round)
5. n/a
6. (United States) Mary Joe Fernández (semifinals)
7. (France) Mary Pierce (final)
8. (Romania) **Irina Spîrlea (champion)**
9. n/a
10. (Sweden) Åsa Carlsson (first round)
11. (United States) Lindsay Lee (first round)
12. (Germany) Sabine Hack (quarterfinals)
13. (United States) Meredith McGrath (quarterfinals)
14. (Italy) Silvia Farina (first round)
15. (Russia) Elena Makarova (second round)
16. (Romania) Ruxandra Dragomir (second round)

== Draw ==
=== Key ===
- Q = Qualifier
- WC = Wild card
- LL = Lucky loser
- Alt = Alternate
- ITF = ITF entry
- PR = Protected ranking
- SR = Special ranking
- SE = Special exempt
- JE = Junior exempt
- JR = Junior Accelerator Programme entrant
- CO = College Accelerator Programme entrant
- NG = Next Gen Accelerator Program entrant
- w/o = Walkover
- r = Retired
- d = Defaulted

=== Finals ===
Semifinals
7	(France) **Mary Pierce**	**6**	**6**
6	(United States) Mary Joe Fernández	2	4
8	(Romania) **Irina Spîrlea**	**6**	**7**
2	(Spain) Arantxa Sánchez Vicario	1	5

Final
7	(France) Mary Pierce	**7**	4	3
8	(Romania) **Irina Spîrlea**	6	**6**	**6**

=== Top half ===
==== Section 1 ====
First round
(Italy) S Cecchini	2	3
(Hungary) **A Temesvári**	**6**	**6**
(Poland) K Nowak	3	1
(Slovakia) **J Husárová**	**6**	**6**
Q	(Ukraine) **N Medvedeva**	2	**4**
14	(Italy) S Farina	**6**	2	r
10	(Sweden) Å Carlsson	2	5
(Czech Republic) **L Richterová**	**6**	**7**
Q	(Colombia) F Zuluaga	1	4
(United States) **A Miller**	**6**	**6**
(France) **S Pitkowski**	**6**	**6**
LL	(Slovakia) D Krajčovičová	1	1

Second round
1	(Spain) **C Martínez**	**6**	**6**
(Hungary) A Temesvári	1	3
(Slovakia) **J Husárová**	**6**	**7**
Q	(Ukraine) N Medvedeva	4	6
(Czech Republic) L Richterová	**6**	0	5
(United States) **A Miller**	4	**6**	**7**
(France) S Pitkowski	3	**6**	3
7	(France) **M Pierce**	**6**	4	**6**

Third round
1	(Spain) **C Martínez**	**6**	**6**
(Slovakia) J Husárová	0	0
(United States) A Miller	3	1
7	(France) **M Pierce**	**6**	**6**

Quarterfinals
1	(Spain) C Martínez	**7**	3	2
7	(France) **M Pierce**	5	**6**	**6**

==== Section 2 ====
First round
Q	(Romania) **C Cristea**	**6**	**6**
(Germany) B Rittner	3	3
(Argentina) M-J Gaidano	1	3
(France) **A Dechaume-Balleret**	**6**	**6**
(Italy) A Serra Zanetti	4	0
12	(Germany) **S Hack**	**6**	**6**
16	(Romania) **R Dragomir**	**6**	**6**
(United States) T Whitlinger-Jones	2	0
Q	(China) F Li	6	2
Q	(Argentina) **P Suárez**	**7**	**6**
(Slovakia) **R Zrubáková**	**7**	**6**
(United States) N Arendt	5	3

Second round
4	(United States) **C Rubin**	**6**	**6**
Q	(Romania) C Cristea	1	4
(France) A Dechaume-Balleret	1	0
12	(Germany) **S Hack**	**6**	**6**
16	(Romania) R Dragomir	5	2
Q	(Argentina) **P Suárez**	**7**	**6**
(Slovakia) R Zrubáková	3	3
6	(United States) **M J Fernández**	**6**	**6**

Third round
4	(United States) C Rubin	1	0
12	(Germany) **S Hack**	**6**	**6**
Q	(Argentina) P Suárez	6	3
6	(United States) **M J Fernández**	**7**	**6**

Quarterfinals
12	(Germany) S Hack	4	3
6	(United States) **M J Fernández**	**6**	**6**

=== Bottom half ===
==== Section 3 ====
First round
(United States) S Cacic	4	1
(Canada) **P Hy-Boulais**	**6**	**6**
(France) **L Ghirardi**	**7**	**6**
(United States) G Helgeson-Nielsen	6	1
(Spain) **V Ruano-Pascual**	**6**	**6**
LL	(Spain) G León García	4	1
15	(Russia) **E Makarova**	4	**6**	**7**
(United States) S Stafford	**6**	1	5
(Germany) **V Martinek**	**5**
WC	(United States) V Williams	3	r
(Germany) S Meier	**6**	4	3
(Austria) **B Schett**	4	**6**	**6**

Second round
8	(Romania) **I Spîrlea**	**6**	**6**
(Canada) P Hy-Boulais	3	2
(France) L Ghirardi	2	2
(Spain) **V Ruano-Pascual**	**6**	**6**
15	(Russia) E Makarova	5	**7**	1
(Germany) **V Martinek**	**7**	5	**6**
(Austria) **B Schett**	**6**	**6**
3	(Bulgaria) M Maleeva	1	3

Third round
8	(Romania) **I Spîrlea**	**7**	**6**
(Spain) V Ruano-Pascual	5	0
(Germany) V Martinek	2	3
(Austria) **B Schett**	**6**	**6**

Quarterfinals
8	(Romania) **I Spîrlea**	**7**	**6**
(Austria) B Schett	6	2

==== Section 4 ====
First round
(France) A Fusai	5	1
(Latvia) **L Neiland**	**7**	**6**
WC	(United States) **K Rinaldi-Stunkel**	6	**6**	**7**
(Austria) P Schwarz	**7**	2	6
(Germany) J Kandarr	4	3
13	(United States) **M McGrath**	**6**	**6**
11	(United States) L Lee	0	**7**	2
WC	(Bulgaria) **K Maleeva**	**6**	6	**6**
Q	(Argentina) M Paz	6	2
(Federal Republic of Yugoslavia) **T Ječmenica**	**7**	**6**
Q	(Italy) L Golarsa	2	4
Q	(Greece) **C Papadáki**	**6**	**6**

Second round
LL	(Germany) **W Probst**	**7**	**6**
(Latvia) L Neiland	5	2
WC	(United States) K Rinaldi-Stunkel	**6**	3	2
13	(United States) **M McGrath**	1	**6**	**6**
WC	(Bulgaria) K Maleeva	4	**6**	4
(Federal Republic of Yugoslavia) **T Ječmenica**	**6**	3	**6**
Q	(Greece) C Papadáki	0	6
2	(Spain) **A Sánchez Vicario**	**6**	**7**

Third round
LL	(Germany) W Probst	2	1
13	(United States) **M McGrath**	**6**	**6**
(Federal Republic of Yugoslavia) T Ječmenica	3	4
2	(Spain) **A Sánchez Vicario**	**6**	**6**

Quarterfinals
13	(United States) M McGrath	3	4
2	(Spain) **A Sánchez Vicario**	**6**	**6**
