= 1996 Bausch & Lomb Championships – Doubles =

Doubles
- 1996 Bausch & Lomb Championships

Final
- Champions: (United States) Chanda Rubin; (Spain) Arantxa Sánchez Vicario
- Runners-up: (United States) Meredith McGrath; (Latvia) Larisa Neiland
- Score: 6–1, 6–1

Details
- Draw: 28
- Seeds: 8

Events
Singles	Doubles
← 1995 ·	Amelia Island Championships	· 1997 →

Amanda Coetzer and Inés Gorrochategui were the defending champions but did not compete that year.

Chanda Rubin and Arantxa Sánchez Vicario won in the final 6–1, 6–1 against Meredith McGrath and Larisa Neiland.

== Seeds ==
Champion seeds are indicated in bold text while text in italics indicates the round in which those seeds were eliminated. The top four seeded teams received byes into the second round.

1. (United States) Gigi Fernández / (United States) Mary Joe Fernández (quarterfinals)
2. (United States) Meredith McGrath / (Latvia) Larisa Neiland (final)
3. (United States) **Chanda Rubin** / (Spain) **Arantxa Sánchez Vicario (champions)**
4. (United States) Nicole Arendt / (Netherlands) Manon Bollegraf (quarterfinals)
5. (Netherlands) Kristie Boogert / (Czech Republic) Jana Novotná (semifinals)
6. (Spain) Conchita Martínez / (Argentina) Patricia Tarabini (quarterfinals)
7. (Italy) Laura Golarsa / (Romania) Irina Spîrlea (semifinals)
8. (Russia) Elena Makarova / (Russia) Eugenia Maniokova (second round)

== Draw ==
=== Key ===
- Q = Qualifier
- WC = Wild card
- LL = Lucky loser
- Alt = Alternate
- ITF = ITF entry
- PR = Protected ranking
- SR = Special ranking
- SE = Special exempt
- JE = Junior exempt
- JR = Junior Accelerator Programme entrant
- CO = College Accelerator Programme entrant
- NG = Next Gen Accelerator Program entrant
- w/o = Walkover
- r = Retired
- d = Defaulted

=== Final ===
Final

3
- (United States) **Chanda Rubin**
- (Spain) **Arantxa Sánchez Vicario**
**6**
**6**

2
- (United States) Meredith McGrath
- (Latvia) Larisa Savchenko
1
1

=== Top half ===
First round

Second round

Quarterfinals

Semifinals

1
- (United States) **G Fernández**
- (United States) **M J Fernández**
**6**
**6**

- (France) L Ghirardi
- (France) S Pitkowski
3
0

- (Canada) J Hetherington
- (United States) K Rinaldi-Stunkel
3
3

- (Canada) **J Hetherington**
- (United States) **K Rinaldi-Stunkel**
**6**
**6**

1
- (United States) G Fernández
- (United States) M J Fernández
5
5

- (Sweden) **Å Carlsson**
- (Hungary) **A Temesvári**
**6**
**6**

7
- (Italy) **L Golarsa**
- (Romania) **I Spîrlea**
**7**
**7**

- (Italy) S Cecchini
- (Germany) B Rittner
4
4

- (Sweden) Å Carlsson
- (Hungary) A Temesvári
4
4

- (Austria) P Schwarz
- (United States) T Whitlinger-Jones
**6**
6
5

7
- (Italy) **L Golarsa**
- (Romania) **I Spîrlea**
**6**
**6**

7
- (Italy) **L Golarsa**
- (Romania) **I Spîrlea**
3
**7**
**7**

7
- (Italy) L Golarsa
- (Romania) I Spîrlea
5
3

3
- (United States) **C Rubin**
- (Spain) **A Sánchez Vicario**
**7**
**6**

3
- (United States) **C Rubin**
- (Spain) **A Sánchez Vicario**
**6**
**6**

- (Slovakia) J Husárová
- (Federal Republic of Yugoslavia) T Ječmenica
4
3

- (Romania) R Dragomir
- (Argentina) M Paz
3
1

- (Romania) **R Dragomir**
- (Argentina) **M Paz**
**6**
**6**

3
- (United States) **C Rubin**
- (Spain) **A Sánchez Vicario**
**6**
**7**

- (Romania) C Cristea
- (United States) M Jackson-Nobrega
0
2

6
- (Spain) C Martínez
- (Argentina) P Tarabini
2
6

- (Bulgaria) **K Maleeva**
- (United States) **S Stafford**
**6**
**6**

- (Bulgaria) K Maleeva
- (United States) S Stafford
4
2

- (United States) L Lee
- (Germany) C Schneider
2
4

6
- (Spain) **C Martínez**
- (Argentina) **P Tarabini**
**6**
**6**

6
- (Spain) **C Martínez**
- (Argentina) **P Tarabini**
**6**
**6**

=== Bottom half ===
First round

Second round

Quarterfinals

Semifinals

5
- (Netherlands) **K Boogert**
- (Czech Republic) **J Novotná**
**6**
**7**

- (Spain) G León García
- (Argentina) P Suárez
2
6

5
- (Netherlands) **K Boogert**
- (Czech Republic) **J Novotná**
**6**
**6**

- (France) **A Fusai**
- (Germany) **W Probst**
**6**
**6**

- (France) A Fusai
- (Germany) W Probst
3
1

- (Austria) S Dopfer
- (Germany) J Kandarr
4
2

5
- (Netherlands) **K Boogert**
- (Czech Republic) **J Novotná**
6
**7**
**7**

- (United States) **S Cacic**
- (Australia) **L Pleming**
**6**
**6**

4
- (United States) N Arendt
- (Netherlands) M Bollegraf
**7**
6
6

- (South Africa) L Horn
- (Australia) T Morton-Rodgers
2
2

- (United States) S Cacic
- (Australia) L Pleming
2
4

4
- (United States) **N Arendt**
- (Netherlands) **M Bollegraf**
**6**
**6**

5
- (Netherlands) K Boogert
- (Czech Republic) J Novotná
3
3

8
- (Russia) **E Makarova**
- (Russia) **E Maniokova**
**6**
**6**

2
- (United States) **M McGrath**
- (Latvia) **L Neiland**
**6**
**6**

- (United States) R Jensen
- (United States) S McCarthy
4
3

8
- (Russia) E Makarova
- (Russia) E Maniokova
4
0
r

- (United States) G Helgeson-Nielsen
- (Croatia) M Murić
5
4

- (United States) **A Lettiere**
- (Greece) **C Papadáki**
**6**
**1**

- (United States) **A Lettiere**
- (Greece) **C Papadáki**
**7**
**6**

- (United States) A Lettiere
- (Greece) C Papadáki
1
2

- (Germany) V Martinek
- (Spain) S Ramón-Cortés
2
1

2
- (United States) **M McGrath**
- (Latvia) **L Neiland**
**6**
**6**

- (Slovakia) **D Krajčovičová**
- (Slovakia) **R Zrubáková**
**6**
**6**

- (Slovakia) D Krajčovičová
- (Slovakia) R Zrubáková
6
2

2
- (United States) **M McGrath**
- (Latvia) **L Neiland**
**7**
**6**
