= 1995 Bausch & Lomb Championships – Doubles =

Doubles
- 1995 Bausch & Lomb Championships

Final
- Champions: (South Africa) Amanda Coetzer; (Argentina) Inés Gorrochategui
- Runners-up: (United States) Nicole Arendt; (Netherlands) Manon Bollegraf
- Score: 6–2, 3–6, 6–2

Details
- Draw: 28 (1 Q / 2 WC )
- Seeds: 8

Events
Singles	Doubles
← 1994 ·	Amelia Island Championships	· 1996 →

Arantxa Sánchez Vicario and Larisa Savchenko were the defending champions but did not compete that year.

Amanda Coetzer and Inés Gorrochategui won in the final 6–2, 3–6, 6–2 against Nicole Arendt and Manon Bollegraf.

== Seeds ==
Champion seeds are indicated in bold text while text in italics indicates the round in which those seeds were eliminated. The top four seeded teams received byes into the second round.

1. (United States) Nicole Arendt / (Netherlands) Manon Bollegraf (final)
2. (South Africa) **Amanda Coetzer** / (Argentina) **Inés Gorrochategui (champions)**
3. (United States) Zina Garrison-Jackson / (United States) Pam Shriver (semifinals)
4. (Russia) Elena Makarova / (Russia) Eugenia Maniokova (second round)
5. (Spain) Conchita Martínez / (Argentina) Patricia Tarabini (quarterfinals)
6. (Czech Republic) Radka Bobková / (Czech Republic) Petra Langrová (quarterfinals)
7. (Germany) Wiltrud Probst / (Canada) Rene Simpson (first round)
8. n/a

== Draw ==
=== Key ===
- Q = Qualifier
- WC = Wild card
- LL = Lucky loser
- Alt = Alternate
- SE = Special exempt
- PR = Protected ranking
- ITF = ITF entry
- JE = Junior exempt
- w/o = Walkover
- r = Retired
- d = Defaulted
- SR = Special ranking

=== Final ===
Final

1
- (United States) Nicole Arendt
- (Netherlands) Manon Bollegraf
2
**6**
2

2
- (South Africa) **Amanda Coetzer**
- (Argentina) **Inés Gorrochategui**
**6**
3
**6**

=== Top half ===
First round

Second round

Quarterfinals

Semifinals

1
- (United States) **N Arendt**
- (Netherlands) **M Bollegraf**
1
**6**
**6**

- (United States) **E deLone**
- (United States) **C Rubin**
**6**
**6**

- (United States) E deLone
- (United States) C Rubin
**6**
3
1

- (United States) B Bowes-Hackney
- (United States) S McCarthy
1
0

1
- (United States) **N Arendt**
- (Netherlands) **M Bollegraf**
**6**
**7**

Q
- (Croatia) M Palaveršić
- (Germany) M Seibold
5
0

5
- (Spain) C Martínez
- (Argentina) P Tarabini
2
6

- (Belgium) **S Appelmans**
- (Netherlands) **M Oremans**
**7**
**6**

- (Belgium) S Appelmans
- (Netherlands) M Oremans
3
2

- (United States) A Keller
- (Greece) C Papadáki
2
**7**
5

5
- (Spain) **C Martínez**
- (Argentina) **P Tarabini**
**6**
**6**

5
- (Spain) **C Martínez**
- (Argentina) **P Tarabini**
**6**
5
**7**

1
- (United States) **N Arendt**
- (Netherlands) **M Bollegraf**
**6**
**6**

- (Germany) M Babel
- (Italy) S Farina
4
0

4
- (Russia) E Makarova
- (Russia) E Maniokova
6
5

- (Belgium) **L Courtois**
- (Romania) **I Spîrlea**
**7**
**7**

- (Belgium) **L Courtois**
- (Romania) **I Spîrlea**
**7**
**7**

- (South Africa) J Kruger
- (United States) S Stafford
5
5

- (Belgium) L Courtois
- (Romania) I Spîrlea
3
2

- (Ukraine) **O Lugina**
- (Bulgaria) **E Pampoulova**
**6**
**6**

- (Germany) **M Babel**
- (Italy) **S Farina**
**6**
**6**

- (South Africa) L Horn
- (United States) M Tu
2
0

- (Ukraine) O Lugina
- (Bulgaria) E Pampoulova
**6**
6
4

- (Germany) **M Babel**
- (Italy) **S Farina**
**6**
**6**

- (Germany) **M Babel**
- (Italy) **S Farina**
4
**7**
**6**

LL
- (Australia) D Jones
- (United States) V Sureephong
2
1

=== Bottom half ===
First round

Second round

Quarterfinals

Semifinals

7
- (Germany) W Probst
- (Canada) R Simpson
**6**
6
5

- (Australia) **K-A Guse**
- (Canada) **P Hy-Boulais**
4
**7**
**7**

- (Australia) **K-A Guse**
- (Canada) **P Hy-Boulais**
**6**
2
**6**

- (Italy) S Cecchini
- (Romania) R Dragomir
6
**6**
3

- (Austria) P Schwarz
- (United States) T Whitlinger-Jones
2
**6**
3

- (Austria) **P Schwarz**
- (United States) **T Whitlinger-Jones**
**7**
3
**6**

- (Australia) K-A Guse
- (Canada) P Hy-Boulais
**7**
3
0

- (France) **A Fusai**
- (Argentina) **M Paz**
**6**
6
**6**

3
- (United States) **Z Garrison-Jackson**
- (United States) **P Shriver**
6
**6**
**6**

WC
- (United Kingdom) J Moore
- (Colombia) X Rodríguez
0
**7**
2

- (France) A Fusai
- (Argentina) M Paz
**6**
3
4

3
- (United States) **Z Garrison-Jackson**
- (United States) **P Shriver**
2
**6**
**6**

3
- (United States) Z Garrison-Jackson
- (United States) P Shriver
4
4

6
- (Czech Republic) **R Bobková**
- (Czech Republic) **P Langrová**
**w/o**

2
- (South Africa) **A Coetzer**
- (Argentina) **I Gorrochategui**
**6**
**6**

- (Netherlands) M Koutstaal
- (Czech Republic) K Kroupová

6
- (Czech Republic) **R Bobková**
- (Czech Republic) **P Langrová**
**6**
**7**

WC
- (United States) Ra Jensen
- (United States) Re Jensen
**6**
3
4

- (Sweden) Å Carlsson
- (United States) A Grossman
1
6

- (Sweden) **Å Carlsson**
- (United States) **A Grossman**
4
**6**
**6**

6
- (Czech Republic) R Bobková
- (Czech Republic) P Langrová

- (Sweden) **M Lindström**
- (Sweden) **M Strandlund**
**6**
**6**

2
- (South Africa) **A Coetzer**
- (Argentina) **I Gorrochategui**
**w/o**

- (Canada) M Bernard
- (Canada) C Delisle
1
4

- (Sweden) M Lindström
- (Sweden) M Strandlund
1
5

2
- (South Africa) **A Coetzer**
- (Argentina) **I Gorrochategui**
**6**
**7**
