= 1996 Bausch & Lomb Championships =

- Date: April 8–14
- Edition: 17th
- Category: Tier II
- Draw: 56S / 28D
- Prize money: $450,000
- Surface: Clay / outdoor
- Location: Amelia Island, FL, U.S.
- Venue: Amelia Island Plantation

Champions

Singles
- (Romania) Irina Spîrlea

Doubles
- (United States) Chanda Rubin / (Spain) Arantxa Sánchez Vicario
← 1995 ·	Amelia Island Championships	· 1997 →

The 1996 Bausch & Lomb Championships was a women's tennis tournament played on outdoor clay courts at the Amelia Island Plantation on Amelia Island, Florida in the United States that was part of the Tier II category of the 1996 WTA Tour. It was the 17th edition of the tournament and was held from April 8 through April 14, 1996. Eighth-seeded Irina Spîrlea won the singles title.

== Finals ==
=== Singles ===
(Romania) Irina Spîrlea defeated (France) Mary Pierce 6–7, 6–4, 6–3

- It was Spîrlea's only singles title of the year and the 3rd of her career.

=== Doubles ===
(United States) Chanda Rubin / (Spain) Arantxa Sánchez Vicario defeated (United States) Meredith McGrath / (Latvia) Larisa Savchenko 6–1, 6–1

- It was Rubin's 4th and last doubles title of the year and the 7th of her career. It was Sánchez Vicario's 4th doubles title of the year and the 44th of her career.
