= 1997 Bausch & Lomb Championships =

- Date: April 7–13
- Edition: 18th
- Category: Tier II
- Draw: 56S / 28D
- Prize money: $450,000
- Surface: Clay / outdoor
- Location: Amelia Island, Florida, U.S.
- Venue: Amelia Island Plantation

Champions

Singles
- (United States) Lindsay Davenport

Doubles
- (United States) Lindsay Davenport / (Czech Republic) Jana Novotná
← 1996 ·	Amelia Island Championships	· 1998 →

The 1997 Bausch & Lomb Championships was a women's tennis tournament played on outdoor clay courts at the Amelia Island Plantation on Amelia Island, Florida in the United States that was part of Tier II of the 1997 WTA Tour. It was the 18th edition of the tournament and was held from April 7 through April 13, 1997. Sixth-seeded Lindsay Davenport won the singles title.

== Finals ==
=== Singles ===
(United States) Lindsay Davenport defeated (France) Mary Pierce 6–2, 6–3

- It was Davenport's 3rd singles title of the year and the 10th of her career.

=== Doubles ===
(United States) Lindsay Davenport / (Czech Republic) Jana Novotná defeated (United States) Nicole Arendt / (Netherlands) Manon Bollegraf 6–3, 6–0

- It was Davenport's 3rd doubles title of the year and the 14th of her career. It was Novotná's 2nd doubles title of the year and the 63rd of her career.
