= 1997 Bausch & Lomb Championships – Doubles =

Doubles
- 1997 Bausch & Lomb Championships

Final
- Champions: (United States) Lindsay Davenport; (Czech Republic) Jana Novotná
- Runners-up: (United States) Nicole Arendt; (Netherlands) Manon Bollegraf
- Score: 6–3, 6–0

Details
- Draw: 28 (1 Q / 1 WC )
- Seeds: 8

Events
Singles	Doubles
← 1996 ·	Amelia Island Championships	· 1998 →

Chanda Rubin and Arantxa Sánchez Vicario were the defending champions but they competed with different partners that year, Rubin with Brenda Schultz-McCarthy and Sánchez Vicario with Larisa Savchenko.

Rubin and Schultz-McCarthy lost in the quarterfinals to Savchenko and Sánchez Vicario.

Savchenko and Sánchez Vicario lost in the semifinals to Nicole Arendt and Manon Bollegraf.

Lindsay Davenport and Jana Novotná won in the final 6–3, 6–0 against Arendt and Bollegraf.

== Seeds ==
Champion seeds are indicated in bold text while text in italics indicates the round in which those seeds were eliminated. The top four seeded teams received byes into the second round.

1. (Latvia) Larisa Savchenko / (Spain) Arantxa Sánchez Vicario (semifinals)
2. (United States) Gigi Fernández / (United States) Mary Joe Fernández (semifinals)
3. (United States) **Lindsay Davenport** / (Czech Republic) **Jana Novotná (champions)**
4. (United States) Nicole Arendt / (Netherlands) Manon Bollegraf (final)
5. (United States) Katrina Adams / (Netherlands) Caroline Vis (quarterfinals)
6. (Spain) Conchita Martínez / (Argentina) Patricia Tarabini (quarterfinals)
7. (United States) Angela Lettiere / (Japan) Nana Miyagi (first round)
8. (United States) Chanda Rubin / (Netherlands) Brenda Schultz-McCarthy (quarterfinals)

== Draw ==
=== Key ===
- Q = Qualifier
- WC = Wild card
- LL = Lucky loser
- Alt = Alternate
- ITF = ITF entry
- PR = Protected ranking
- SR = Special ranking
- SE = Special exempt
- JE = Junior exempt
- JR = Junior Accelerator Programme entrant
- CO = College Accelerator Programme entrant
- NG = Next Gen Accelerator Program entrant
- w/o = Walkover
- r = Retired
- d = Defaulted

=== Final ===
Final

4
- (United States) Nicole Arendt
- (Netherlands) Manon Bollegraf
3
0

3
- (United States) **Lindsay Davenport**
- (Czech Republic) **Jana Novotná**
**6**
**6**

=== Top half ===
First round

Second round

Quarterfinals

Semifinals

1
- (Latvia) **L Savchenko**
- (Spain) **A Sánchez Vicario**
**6**
**6**

- (Ukraine) **O Lugina**
- (Germany) **E Wagner**
**6**
**6**

- (Ukraine) O Lugina
- (Germany) E Wagner
4
4

- (Argentina) F Labat
- (Russia) E Likhovtseva
4
3

1
- (Latvia) **L Savchenko**
- (Spain) **A Sánchez Vicario**
**1**

WC
- (Germany) **W Probst**
- (Switzerland) **P Schnyder**
**w/o**

8
- (United States) C Rubin
- (Netherlands) B Schultz-McCarthy
1
r

- (Germany) A Huber
- (United States) M Seles

WC
- (Germany) W Probst
- (Switzerland) P Schnyder
2
2

LL
- (Czech Republic) P Langrová
- (France) S Pitkowski
3
2

8
- (United States) **C Rubin**
- (Netherlands) **B Schultz-McCarthy**
**6**
**6**

8
- (United States) **C Rubin**
- (Netherlands) **B Schultz-McCarthy**
**6**
**6**

1
- (Latvia) L Savchenko
- (Spain) A Sánchez Vicario
**6**
6
2

4
- (United States) **N Arendt**
- (Netherlands) **M Bollegraf**
4
**7**
**6**

4
- (United States) **N Arendt**
- (Netherlands) **M Bollegraf**
**7**
3
**7**

- (Canada) P Hy-Boulais
- (Croatia) M Murić
2
1

- (Poland) M Grzybowska
- (Chinese Taipei) S-T Wang
5
**6**
5

- (Poland) **M Grzybowska**
- (Chinese Taipei) **S-T Wang**
**6**
**6**

4
- (United States) **N Arendt**
- (Netherlands) **M Bollegraf**
**6**
**6**

- (United States) **A Grossman**
- (United States) **T Whitlinger-Jones**
**6**
**6**

6
- (Spain) C Martínez
- (Argentina) P Tarabini
2
4

- (United States) L McNeil
- (Canada) R Simpson
3
3

- (United States) A Grossman
- (United States) T Whitlinger-Jones
3
4

- (Argentina) L Montalvo
- (Slovakia) H Nagyová
**6**
1
4

6
- (Spain) **C Martínez**
- (Argentina) **P Tarabini**
**6**
**6**

6
- (Spain) **C Martínez**
- (Argentina) **P Tarabini**
0
**6**
**6**

=== Bottom half ===
First round

Second round

Quarterfinals

Semifinals

7
- (United States) A Lettiere
- (Japan) N Miyagi
5
4

- (Romania) **R Dragomir**
- (Croatia) **I Majoli**
**7**
**6**

- (Romania) **R Dragomir**
- (Croatia) **I Majoli**
**6**
**6**

- (France) **A Fusai**
- (Argentina) **M Paz**
**6**
**7**

- (France) A Fusai
- (Argentina) M Paz
4
4

- (Romania) C Cristea
- (Greece) C Papadáki
4
6

- (Romania) R Dragomir
- (Croatia) I Majoli
0
3

- (Slovenia) **T Križan**
- (France) **N van Lottum**
**7**
1
**6**

3
- (United States) **L Davenport**
- (Czech Republic) **J Novotná**
**6**
**6**

Q
- (Federal Republic of Yugoslavia) T Ječmenica
- (Austria) K Kschwendt
5
**6**
1

- (Slovenia) T Križan
- (France) N van Lottum
1
1

3
- (United States) **L Davenport**
- (Czech Republic) **J Novotná**
**6**
**6**

3
- (United States) **L Davenport**
- (Czech Republic) **J Novotná**
**6**
5
**7**

5
- (United States) **K Adams**
- (Netherlands) **C Vis**
**7**
4
**6**

2
- (United States) G Fernández
- (United States) M J Fernández
3
**7**
5

- (Italy) S Farina
- (Austria) B Schett
5
**6**
3

5
- (United States) **K Adams**
- (Netherlands) **C Vis**
**7**
**6**

- (Australia) L Pleming
- (United Kingdom) C Wood
1
2

- (South Africa) A Coetzer
- (Argentina) I Gorrochategui
6
3

- (South Africa) **A Coetzer**
- (Argentina) **I Gorrochategui**
**6**
**6**

5
- (United States) K Adams
- (Netherlands) C Vis
1
**6**
2

- (Czech Republic) **E Martincová**
- (Australia) **R McQuillan**
**6**
**6**

2
- (United States) **G Fernández**
- (United States) **M J Fernández**
**6**
1
**6**

- (Germany) S Meier
- (Austria) P Schwarz
2
4

- (Czech Republic) E Martincová
- (Australia) R McQuillan
2
3

2
- (United States) **G Fernández**
- (United States) **M J Fernández**
**6**
**6**
