= 1986 Sunkist WITA Championships =

1986 WITA Championships
- Date: April 14–20
- Edition: 7th
- Draw: 56S / 28D
- Prize money: $275,000
- Surface: Clay / outdoor
- Location: Amelia Island, Florida, U.S
- Venue: Amelia Island Plantation

Champions

Singles
- (West Germany) Steffi Graf

Doubles
- (West Germany) Claudia Kohde-Kilsch (Czechoslovakia) Helena Suková
| ← 1985 · | Amelia Island Championships | · 1987 → |

The 1986 Sunkist Women's International Tennis Association (WITA) Championships was a women's tennis tournament played on outdoor clay courts at the Amelia Island Plantation on Amelia Island, Florida in the United States that was part of the 1986 WTA Tour. It was the seventh edition of the tournament and was held from April 14 through April 20, 1986. First-seeded Steffi Graf won the singles title and earned $40,000 first-prize money. The WTA had to pay the tournament organizers a $15,000 fine because both Chris Evert-Lloyd and Martina Navratilova chose not to participate in the event.

== Finals ==
=== Singles ===
(West Germany) Steffi Graf defeated (West Germany) Claudia Kohde-Kilsch 6–4, 5–7, 7–6^{(7–3)}

- It was Graf's 2nd singles title of the year and of her career.

=== Doubles ===
(West Germany) Claudia Kohde-Kilsch / (Czechoslovakia) Helena Suková defeated (Argentina) Gabriela Sabatini / (France) Catherine Tanvier 6–2, 5–7, 7–6^{(9–7)}

- It was Kohde-Kilsch's 2nd title of the year and the 15th of her career. It was Suková's 3rd title of the year and the 13th of her career.
