= 1997 Bausch & Lomb Championships – Singles =

Singles
- 1997 Bausch & Lomb Championships

Final
- Champion: (United States) Lindsay Davenport
- Runner-up: (France) Mary Pierce
- Score: 6–2, 6–3

Details
- Draw: 56 (8 Q / 3 WC )
- Seeds: 16

Events
Singles	Doubles
← 1996 ·	Amelia Island Championships	· 1998 →

Irina Spîrlea was the defending champion but did not compete that year.

Lindsay Davenport won in the final 6–2, 6–3 against Mary Pierce.

== Seeds ==
A champion seed is indicated in bold text while text in italics indicates the round in which that seed was eliminated. The top eight seeds received a bye to the second round.

1. (Czech Republic) Jana Novotná (third round)
2. (Spain) Arantxa Sánchez Vicario (quarterfinals)
3. n/a
4. (Spain) Conchita Martínez (quarterfinals)
5. (Germany) Anke Huber (third round)
6. (United States) **Lindsay Davenport (champion)**
7. n/a
8. (Croatia) Iva Majoli (semifinals)
9. (United States) Mary Joe Fernández (quarterfinals)
10. (Austria) Barbara Paulus (first round)
11. (France) Mary Pierce (final)
12. (South Africa) Amanda Coetzer (semifinals)
13. (Netherlands) Brenda Schultz-McCarthy (third round)
14. (Russia) Elena Likhovtseva (second round)
15. n/a
16. (Romania) Ruxandra Dragomir (third round)

== Draw ==
=== Key ===
- Q = Qualifier
- WC = Wild card
- LL = Lucky loser
- Alt = Alternate
- ITF = ITF entry
- PR = Protected ranking
- SR = Special ranking
- SE = Special exempt
- JE = Junior exempt
- JR = Junior Accelerator Programme entrant
- CO = College Accelerator Programme entrant
- NG = Next Gen Accelerator Program entrant
- w/o = Walkover
- r = Retired
- d = Defaulted

=== Finals ===
Semifinals
12	(South Africa) Amanda Coetzer	5	2
6	(United States) **Lindsay Davenport**	**7**	**6**
8	(Croatia) Iva Majoli	**6**	5	6
11	(France) **Mary Pierce**	2	**7**	**7**

Final
6	(United States) **Lindsay Davenport**	**6**	**6**
11	(France) Mary Pierce	2	3

=== Top half ===
==== Section 1 ====
First round
Q	(United States) C Morariu	1	1
(Austria) **B Schett**	**6**	**6**
Q	(Spain) G León García	**6**	6	2
WC	(France) **A Mauresmo**	4	**7**	**6**
Q	(Czech Republic) E Martincová	5	1
12	(South Africa) **A Coetzer**	**7**	**6**
9	(United States) **M J Fernández**	**6**	**6**
(France) S Pitkowski	3	0
(Canada) **P Hy-Boulais**	4	**6**	**6**
Q	(Australia) R McQuillan	**6**	2	1
WC	(South Africa) J Steck	5	3
WC	(Germany) **M Weingärtner**	**7**	**6**

Second round
1	(Czech Republic) **J Novotná**	4	**6**	**6**
(Austria) B Schett	**6**	4	0
WC	(France) A Mauresmo	4	**6**	1
12	(South Africa) **A Coetzer**	**6**	1	**6**
9	(United States) **M J Fernández**	**6**	**6**
(Canada) P Hy-Boulais	3	0
WC	(Germany) **M Weingärtner**	2	**7**	**7**
LL	(Federal Republic of Yugoslavia) T Ječmenica	**6**	6	5

Third round
1	(Czech Republic) J Novotná	2	**6**	1
12	(South Africa) **A Coetzer**	**6**	1	**6**
9	(United States) **M J Fernández**	**6**	**6**
WC	(Germany) M Weingärtner	1	2

Quarterfinals
12	(South Africa) **A Coetzer**	**6**	**6**
9	(United States) M J Fernández	2	4

==== Section 2 ====
First round
(Romania) C Cristea	6	2
(United States) **J Capriati**	**7**	**6**
(Italy) **S Farina**	**7**	**7**
(Austria) M Maruska	5	5
Q	(Spain) C Torrens Valero	3	2
LL	(Germany) **J Kandarr**	**6**	**6**
13	(Netherlands) **B Schultz-McCarthy**	**6**	**6**
(Czech Republic) A Gerši	1	1
Q	(Argentina) B Fulco-Villella	**7**	4	0
(Czech Republic) **S Kleinová**	5	**6**	**6**
(Spain) M Serna	**6**	2	1
(Chinese Taipei) **S-T Wang**	4	**6**	**6**

Second round
LL	(Argentina) **M Díaz Oliva**	**w/o**
(United States) J Capriati
(Italy) S Farina	4	6
LL	(Germany) **J Kandarr**	**6**	**7**
13	(Netherlands) **B Schultz-McCarthy**	**7**	**6**
(Czech Republic) S Kleinová	5	3
(Chinese Taipei) S-T Wang	2	0
6	(United States) **L Davenport**	**6**	**6**

Third round
LL	(Argentina) M Díaz Oliva	3	1
LL	(Germany) **J Kandarr**	**6**	**6**
13	(Netherlands) B Schultz-McCarthy	2	1
6	(United States) **L Davenport**	**6**	**6**

Quarterfinals
LL	(Germany) J Kandarr	2	2
6	(United States) **L Davenport**	**6**	**6**

=== Bottom half ===
==== Section 3 ====
First round
Q	(Spain) **Á Montolio**	2	**6**	**7**
(Argentina) P Suárez	**6**	4	6
(France) **A Fusai**	**6**	**7**
(Latvia) L Savchenko	2	6
(United States) T Whitlinger-Jones	**6**	4	1
14	(Russia) **E Likhovtseva**	2	**6**	**6**
10	(Austria) B Paulus	4	6
(United States) **C Rubin**	**6**	**7**
(United States) J Watanabe	**6**	4	1
Q	(United States) **V Williams**	1	**6**	**6**
(Switzerland) P Schnyder	6	**7**	4
(South Africa) **J Kruger**	**7**	5	**6**

Second round
8	(Croatia) **I Majoli**	**6**	**6**
Q	(Spain) Á Montolio	3	2
(France) **A Fusai**	1	**7**	**6**
14	(Russia) E Likhovtseva	**6**	6	4
(United States) **C Rubin**	**6**	**6**
Q	(United States) V Williams	4	0
(South Africa) J Kruger	3	1
4	(Spain) **C Martínez**	**6**	**6**

Third round
8	(Croatia) **I Majoli**	**6**	**6**
(France) A Fusai	0	2
(United States) C Rubin	3	3
4	(Spain) **C Martínez**	**6**	**6**

Quarterfinals
8	(Croatia) **I Majoli**	1	**6**	**6**
4	(Spain) C Martínez	**6**	3	3

==== Section 4 ====
First round
(Slovakia) **R Zrubáková**	**6**	**6**
(Argentina) I Gorrochategui	4	3
(Russia) E Makarova	1	4
(Slovakia) **H Nagyová**	**6**	**6**
(Germany) E Wagner	0	1
11	(France) **M Pierce**	**6**	**6**
16	(Romania) **R Dragomir**	**6**	**6**
(Czech Republic) D Chládková	4	2
(Czech Republic) P Langrová	2	4
(United States) **A Grossman**	**6**	**6**
(Argentina) **F Labat**	**6**	**6**
(Austria) K Kschwendt	3	1

Second round
5	(Germany) **A Huber**	**6**	**6**
(Slovakia) R Zrubáková	2	2
(Slovakia) H Nagyová	5	0
11	(France) **M Pierce**	**7**	**6**
16	(Romania) **R Dragomir**	**6**	**6**
(United States) A Grossman	2	3
(Argentina) F Labat	**6**	2	3
2	(Spain) **A Sánchez Vicario**	3	**6**	**6**

Third round
5	(Germany) A Huber	6	2
11	(France) **M Pierce**	**7**	**6**
16	(Romania) R Dragomir	3	**6**	4
2	(Spain) **A Sánchez Vicario**	**6**	1	**6**

Quarterfinals
11	(France) **M Pierce**	**6**	**6**
2	(Spain) A Sánchez Vicario	2	1
