= 1995 Bausch & Lomb Championships =

- Date: April 3–9
- Edition: 16th
- Category: Tier II
- Draw: 56S / 28D
- Prize money: $430,000
- Surface: Clay / outdoor
- Location: Amelia Island, Florida, U.S.
- Venue: Amelia Island Plantation

Champions

Singles
- (Spain) Conchita Martínez

Doubles
- (South Africa) Amanda Coetzer (Argentina) Inés Gorrochategui
← 1994 ·	Amelia Island Championships	· 1996 →

The 1995 Bausch & Lomb Championships was a women's tennis tournament played on outdoor clay courts at the Amelia Island Plantation on Amelia Island, Florida in the United States that was part of Tier II of the 1995 WTA Tour. It was the 16th edition of the tournament and was held from April 3 through April 9, 1995. First-seeded Conchita Martínez won the singles title and earned $79,000 first-prize money.

== Finals ==
=== Singles ===
(Spain) Conchita Martínez defeated (Argentina) Gabriela Sabatini 6–1, 6–4

- It was Martínez's 2nd title of the year and the 26th of her career.

=== Doubles ===
(South Africa) Amanda Coetzer / (Argentina) Inés Gorrochategui defeated (United States) Nicole Arendt / (Netherlands) Manon Bollegraf 6–2, 3–6, 6–2

- It was Coetzer's 1st title of the year and the 7th of her career. It was Gorrochategui's 1st title of the year and the 5th of her career.
