= 1997 Australian Open – Women's doubles =

Tennis tournament

Women's doubles
- 1997 Australian Open

Final
- Champions: (Switzerland) Martina Hingis (Belarus) Natasha Zvereva
- Runners-up: (United States) Lindsay Davenport (United States) Lisa Raymond
- Score: 6–2, 6–2

Details
- Draw: 64
- Seeds: 16

Events
Singles	men	women		boys	girls
Doubles	men	women	mixed	boys	girls
WC Singles	men	women	quad
WC Doubles	men	women	quad
Legends	men	women	mixed
- Australian Open

Martina Hingis and Natasha Zvereva defeated Lindsay Davenport and Lisa Raymond in the final, 6–2, 6–2 to win the women's doubles tennis title at the 1997 Australian Open. It was Hingis' first Australian Open doubles title and second major doubles title, and Zvereva's third Australian Open doubles title and 16th major doubles title.

Chanda Rubin and Arantxa Sánchez Vicario were the defending champions, but competed this year with different partners. Rubin partnered Brenda Schultz-McCarthy and lost in the third round, while Sánchez Vicario partnered Gigi Fernández and lost in the semifinals.

== Seeds ==
1. (United States) Gigi Fernández / (Spain) Arantxa Sánchez Vicario (semifinals)
2. (Latvia) Larisa Neiland / (Czech Republic) Helena Suková (semifinals)
3. (United States) Lindsay Davenport / (United States) Lisa Raymond (final)
4. (Switzerland) Martina Hingis / (Belarus) Natasha Zvereva (champions)
5. (United States) Nicole Arendt / (Netherlands) Manon Bollegraf (quarterfinals)
6. (United States) Katrina Adams / (United States) Mary Joe Fernández (second round)
7. (United States) Lori McNeil / (United States) Linda Wild (third round)
8. (United States) Chanda Rubin / (Netherlands) Brenda Schultz-McCarthy (third round)
9. (Indonesia) Yayuk Basuki / (Netherlands) Caroline Vis (second round)
10. (Netherlands) Kristie Boogert / (Romania) Irina Spîrlea (first round)
11. (United States) Amy Frazier / (United States) Kimberly Po (second round)
12. (Spain) Conchita Martínez / (Argentina) Patricia Tarabini (quarterfinals)
13. (Japan) Naoko Kijimuta / (Japan) Nana Miyagi (quarterfinals)
14. (Belgium) Sabine Appelmans / (Netherlands) Miriam Oremans (second round)
15. (France) Alexia Dechaume-Balleret / (France) Sandrine Testud (first round)
16. (France) Alexandra Fusai / (Argentina) Mercedes Paz (second round)

== Draw ==
Key

- Q = Qualifier
- WC = Wild card
- LL = Lucky loser
- Alt = Alternate
- ITF = ITF entry
- PR = Protected ranking
- SR = Special ranking
- SE = Special exempt
- JE = Junior exempt
- JR = Junior Accelerator Programme entrant
- CO = College Accelerator Programme entrant
- NG = Next Gen Accelerator Program entrant
- w/o = Walkover
- r = Retired
- d = Defaulted

=== Finals ===
Quarterfinals
1	(United States) Gigi Fernández (Spain) Arantxa Sánchez Vicario	6	7
5	(United States) Nicole Arendt (Netherlands) Manon Bollegraf	4	5
4	(Switzerland) Martina Hingis (Belarus) Natasha Zvereva	6	6
(Spain) Virginia Ruano Pascual (Argentina) Paola Suárez	3	2
12	(Spain) Conchita Martínez (Argentina) Patricia Tarabini	4	6^{2}
3	(United States) Lindsay Davenport (United States) Lisa Raymond	6	7^{7}
13	(Japan) Naoko Kijimuta (Japan) Nana Miyagi	2	3
2	(Latvia) Larisa Neiland (Czech Republic) Helena Suková	6	6

Semifinals
1	(United States) Gigi Fernández (Spain) Arantxa Sánchez Vicario	3	7	2
4	(Switzerland) Martina Hingis (Belarus) Natasha Zvereva	6	5	6
3	(United States) Lindsay Davenport (United States) Lisa Raymond	7	6
2	(Latvia) Larisa Neiland (Czech Republic) Helena Suková	5	3

Final
4	(Switzerland) Martina Hingis (Belarus) Natasha Zvereva	6	6
3	(United States) Lindsay Davenport (United States) Lisa Raymond	2	2

=== Top half ===
==== Section 1 ====
First round
1	(United States) G Fernández (Spain) A Sánchez Vicario	6	6
WC	(South Africa) A Coetzer (France) M Pierce	3	2
WC	(United States) J Capriati (Croatia) I Majoli	6^{4}	6	6
(United Kingdom) V Lake (Australia) L Pleming	7^{7}	1	4
(Australia) A Ellwood (Australia) N Pratt	6	6
(Czech Republic) L Cenková (Slovakia) D Krajčovičová	1	0
(United States) D Graham (Australia) K Radford	6	2	6
10	(Netherlands) K Boogert (Romania) I Spîrlea	2	6	4
15	(France) A Dechaume-Balleret (France) S Testud	6^{3}	6	4
(Netherlands) S Noorlander (Czech Republic) H Vildová	7^{7}	1	6
(Germany) A Huber (Germany) B Rittner	6	4	6
(Australia) C Barclay (Australia) K-A Guse	1	6	3
(Romania) C Cristea (Federal Republic of Yugoslavia) T Ječmenica	4	6	3
Alt	(United States) J Lee (Slovakia) H Nagyová	6	4	6
WC	(Australia) S Drake-Brockman (Australia) T Musgrave	1	2
5	(United States) N Arendt (Netherlands) M Bollegraf	6	6

Second round
1	(United States) G Fernández (Spain) A Sánchez Vicario	6	7^{7}
WC	(United States) J Capriati (Croatia) I Majoli	3	6^{5}
(Australia) A Ellwood (Australia) N Pratt	1	3
(United States) D Graham (Australia) K Radford	6	6
(Netherlands) S Noorlander (Czech Republic) H Vildová	0	6^{4}
(Germany) A Huber (Germany) B Rittner	6	7^{7}
Alt	(United States) J Lee (Slovakia) H Nagyová	3	3
5	(United States) N Arendt (Netherlands) M Bollegraf	6	6

Third round
1	(United States) G Fernández (Spain) A Sánchez Vicario	6	6
(United States) D Graham (Australia) K Radford	4	3
(Germany) A Huber (Germany) B Rittner	2	4
5	(United States) N Arendt (Netherlands) M Bollegraf	6	6

Quarterfinals
1	(United States) G Fernández (Spain) A Sánchez Vicario	6	7
5	(United States) N Arendt (Netherlands) M Bollegraf	4	5

==== Section 2 ====
First round
4	(Switzerland) M Hingis (Belarus) N Zvereva	6	6
(Japan) K Nagatsuka (Czech Republic) L Richterová	1	1
(United States) A Lettiere (Italy) G Pizzichini	4	6	5
(Argentina) I Gorrochategui (Spain) Á Montolio	6	2	7
(Romania) R Dragomir (Italy) S Farina	6	6
(United States) P Shriver (Australia) E Smylie	4	2
(Sweden) Å Carlsson (Slovakia) K Studeníková	2	2
11	(United States) A Frazier (United States) K Po	6	6
14	(Belgium) S Appelmans (Netherlands) M Oremans	6	6
(Hungary) V Csurgó (Greece) C Papadáki	1	3
WC	(Australia) J Limmer (Australia) L McShea	2	1
(Spain) V Ruano Pascual (Argentina) P Suárez	6	6
(Czech Republic) E Martincová (Germany) E Wagner	3	6	3
(Australia) N Bradtke (Australia) R McQuillan	6	4	6
(Russia) A Kournikova (Russia) E Likhovtseva	2	3
8	(United States) C Rubin (Netherlands) B Schultz-McCarthy	6	6

Second round
4	(Switzerland) M Hingis (Belarus) N Zvereva	6	6
(Argentina) I Gorrochategui (Spain) Á Montolio	0	1
(Romania) R Dragomir (Italy) S Farina	6	4	6
11	(United States) A Frazier (United States) K Po	4	6	2
14	(Belgium) S Appelmans (Netherlands) M Oremans	6	5	4
(Spain) V Ruano Pascual (Argentina) P Suárez	1	7	6
(Australia) N Bradtke (Australia) R McQuillan	4	2
8	(United States) C Rubin (Netherlands) B Schultz-McCarthy	6	6

Third round
4	(Switzerland) M Hingis (Belarus) N Zvereva	6	6
(Romania) R Dragomir (Italy) S Farina	2	1
(Spain) V Ruano Pascual (Argentina) P Suárez	6^{6}	6	6
8	(United States) C Rubin (Netherlands) B Schultz-McCarthy	7^{8}	1	4

Quarterfinals
4	(Switzerland) M Hingis (Belarus) N Zvereva	6	6
(Spain) V Ruano Pascual (Argentina) P Suárez	3	2

=== Bottom half ===
==== Section 3 ====
First round
6	(United States) K Adams (United States) MJ Fernández	6	6
(Russia) E Makarova (Ukraine) N Medvedeva	2	2
(Slovenia) T Križan (France) N van Lottum	0	3
(Slovakia) K Habšudová (Slovakia) R Zrubáková	6	6
(Austria) K Kschwendt (Austria) B Schett	4	1
(Canada) P Hy-Boulais (United States) C Morariu	6	6
(Germany) V Martinek (Germany) C Schneider	1	3
12	(Spain) C Martínez (Argentina) P Tarabini	6	6
9	(Indonesia) Y Basuki (Netherlands) C Vis	6	6
(Poland) M Grzybowska (Poland) A Olsza	2	3
(South Korea) S-h Park (Chinese Taipei) S-t Wang	7	6
(Canada) S Jeyaseelan (Canada) R Simpson	5	2
(Japan) M Saeki (Japan) Y Yoshida	4	6	4
(Czech Republic) P Langrová (Czech Republic) L Němečková	6	0	6
(Italy) R Grande (Japan) A Sugiyama	3	6^{2}
3	(United States) L Davenport (United States) L Raymond	6	7^{7}

Second round
6	(United States) K Adams (United States) MJ Fernández	6^{3}	4
(Slovakia) K Habšudová (Slovakia) R Zrubáková	7^{7}	6
(Canada) P Hy-Boulais (United States) C Morariu	1	6^{6}
12	(Spain) C Martínez (Argentina) P Tarabini	6	7^{8}
9	(Indonesia) Y Basuki (Netherlands) C Vis	6^{5}	6^{5}
(South Korea) S-h Park (Chinese Taipei) S-t Wang	7^{7}	7^{7}
(Czech Republic) P Langrová (Czech Republic) L Němečková	3	4
3	(United States) L Davenport (United States) L Raymond	6	6

Third round
(Slovakia) K Habšudová (Slovakia) R Zrubáková	3	4
12	(Spain) C Martínez (Argentina) P Tarabini	6	6
(South Korea) S-h Park (Chinese Taipei) S-t Wang	6^{2}	0
3	(United States) L Davenport (United States) L Raymond	7^{7}	6

Quarterfinals
12	(Spain) C Martínez (Argentina) P Tarabini	4	6^{2}
3	(United States) L Davenport (United States) L Raymond	6	7^{7}

==== Section 4 ====
First round
7	(United States) L McNeil (United States) L Wild	6	6
(Japan) R Hiraki (Argentina) F Labat	3	1
(Germany) K Freye (Germany) S Meier	2	3
(Czech Republic) K Kroupová (Czech Republic) E Melicharová	6	6
(Italy) L Golarsa (France) A-G Sidot	3	6^{1}
(United States) E deLone (United Kingdom) C Wood	6	7^{7}
(Belgium) N Feber (United States) A Grossman	5	1
13	(Japan) N Kijimuta (Japan) N Miyagi	7	6
16	(France) A Fusai (Argentina) M Paz	6	6
(Australia) D Jones (Thailand) T Tanasugarn	2	4
(Bulgaria) S Krivencheva (Italy) F Perfetti	6	6
(Germany) W Probst (Switzerland) P Schnyder	3	4
(United States) M Werdel-Witmeyer (United States) T Whitlinger-Jones	2	0
(Belgium) E Callens (United States) G Helgeson-Nielsen	6	6
(United States) E Hakami (France) S Pitkowski	1	3
2	(Latvia) L Neiland (Czech Republic) H Suková	6	6

Second round
7	(United States) L McNeil (United States) L Wild	6	6
(Czech Republic) K Kroupová (Czech Republic) E Melicharová	3	1
(United States) E deLone (United Kingdom) C Wood	3	5
13	(Japan) N Kijimuta (Japan) N Miyagi	6	7
16	(France) A Fusai (Argentina) M Paz	6	3	4
(Bulgaria) S Krivencheva (Italy) F Perfetti	3	6	6
(Belgium) E Callens (United States) G Helgeson-Nielsen	2	2
2	(Latvia) L Neiland (Czech Republic) H Suková	6	6

Third round
7	(United States) L McNeil (United States) L Wild	4	2
13	(Japan) N Kijimuta (Japan) N Miyagi	6	6
(Bulgaria) S Krivencheva (Italy) F Perfetti	5	3
2	(Latvia) L Neiland (Czech Republic) H Suková	7	6

Quarterfinals
13	(Japan) N Kijimuta (Japan) N Miyagi	2	3
2	(Latvia) L Neiland (Czech Republic) H Suková	6	6
