= 1997 Australian Open – Mixed doubles =

Mixed doubles
- 1997 Australian Open

Final
- Champions: (Netherlands) Manon Bollegraf (United States) Rick Leach
- Runners-up: (Latvia) Larisa Neiland (South Africa) John-Laffnie de Jager
- Score: 6–3, 6–7^{(5–7)}, 7–5

Details
- Draw: 32
- Seeds: 8

Events
Singles	men	women		boys	girls
Doubles	men	women	mixed	boys	girls
WC Singles	men	women	quad
WC Doubles	men	women	quad
Legends	men	women	mixed
- Australian Open

Larisa Neiland and Mark Woodforde were the defending champions but only Neiland competed that year with John-Laffnie de Jager.

Neiland and de Jager lost in the final 6–3, 6–7^{(5–7)}, 7–5 against Manon Bollegraf and Rick Leach.

== Seeds ==
Champion seeds are indicated in bold text while text in italics indicates the round in which those seeds were eliminated.

1. (United States) Lindsay Davenport / (Canada) Grant Connell (second round)
2. (United States) Lisa Raymond / (United States) Patrick Galbraith (quarterfinals)
3. (Netherlands) **Manon Bollegraf** / (United States) **Rick Leach (champions)**
4. (Czech Republic) Helena Suková / (Czech Republic) Cyril Suk (second round)
5. (United States) Katrina Adams / (Belgium) Libor Pimek (first round)
6. (Netherlands) Caroline Vis / (South Africa) Byron Talbot (first round)
7. n/a
8. (Netherlands) Kristie Boogert / (Netherlands) Menno Oosting (first round)

== Draw ==
Key

- Q = Qualifier
- WC = Wild card
- LL = Lucky loser
- Alt = Alternate
- ITF = ITF entry
- PR = Protected ranking
- SR = Special ranking
- SE = Special exempt
- JE = Junior exempt
- JR = Junior Accelerator Programme entrant
- CO = College Accelerator Programme entrant
- NG = Next Gen Accelerator Program entrant
- w/o = Walkover
- r = Retired
- d = Defaulted

=== Final ===
Final
3	(Netherlands) **Manon Bollegraf** (United States) **Rick Leach**	**6**	6^{5}	**7**
	(Latvia) Larisa Neiland (South Africa) John-Laffnie de Jager	3	**7^{7}**	5

=== Top half ===
First round
1	(United States) **L Davenport** (Canada) **G Connell**	**6**	**7**
(Russia) E Likhovtseva (Russia) A Olhovskiy	2	5
ALT	(United States) A Lettiere (United States) F Montana	5	0
(Romania) **I Spîrlea** (United States) **D Johnson**	**7**	**6**
(United States) **G Fernández** (Australia) **A Florent**	6^{1}	**6**	**7^{7}**
(Argentina) P Tarabini (Argentina) P Albano	**7^{7}**	2	6^{3}
(United States) **L McNeil** (United States) **B MacPhie**	**6**	**6**
5	(United States) K Adams (Belgium) L Pimek	2	1
3	(Netherlands) **M Bollegraf** (United States) **R Leach**	**7^{7}**	**7**
(France) A Fusai (South Africa) D Adams	6^{4}	5
(Netherlands) **M Oremans** (Netherlands) **H J Davids**	**7**	**6**
(United States) N Arendt (South Africa) C van Rensburg	5	4
WC	(United States) **J Capriati** (Australia) **P Cash**	**6**	**7**
(Australia) R McQuillan (Australia) D Macpherson	0	5
(Ukraine) **N Medvedeva** (Netherlands) **J Eltingh**	**6**	**6**
8	(Netherlands) K Boogert (Netherlands) M Oosting	1	4

Second round
1	(United States) L Davenport (Canada) G Connell	6^{4}	**6**	4
(Romania) **I Spîrlea** (United States) **D Johnson**	**7^{7}**	4	**6**
(United States) G Fernández (Australia) A Florent	4	3
(United States) **L McNeil** (United States) **B MacPhie**	**6**	**6**
3	(Netherlands) **M Bollegraf** (United States) **R Leach**	**6**	**6**
(Netherlands) M Oremans (Netherlands) H J Davids	2	3
WC	(United States) J Capriati (Australia) P Cash	3	2
(Ukraine) **N Medvedeva** (Netherlands) **J Eltingh**	**6**	**6**

Quarterfinals
(Romania) I Spîrlea (United States) D Johnson
(United States) **L McNeil** (United States) **B MacPhie**	**w/o**
3	(Netherlands) **M Bollegraf** (United States) **R Leach**	3	**6**	**6**
(Ukraine) N Medvedeva (Netherlands) J Eltingh	**6**	3	4

Semifinals
(United States) L McNeil (United States) B MacPhie	6^{8}	1
3	(Netherlands) **M Bollegraf** (United States) **R Leach**	**7^{10}**	**6**

=== Bottom half ===
First round
ALT	(United States) L Wild (Australia) A Kratzmann	2	**6**	2
WC	(Australia) **N Bradtke** (Australia) **J Eagle**	**6**	4	**6**
(United States) **J Grabb** (France) **A Dechaume-Balleret**	**7**	**6**
(Italy) L Golarsa (Argentina) L Lobo	5	0
(Latvia) **L Neiland** (South Africa) **J-L de Jager**	**6**	**6**
(Indonesia) Y Basuki (South Africa) M Barnard	1	4
WC	(Australia) E Smylie (Australia) S Draper	4	1
4	(Czech Republic) **H Suková** (Czech Republic) **C Suk**	**6**	**6**
6	(Netherlands) C Vis (South Africa) B Talbot	3	1
(United States) **K Po** (United States) **J Waite**	**6**	**6**
(Japan) N Miyagi (United States) K Kinnear	3	2
(Russia) **A Kournikova** (The Bahamas) **M Knowles**	**6**	**6**
(Australia) **K-A Guse** (South Africa) **P Norval**	**6**	5	**7**
(United States) D Graham (Sweden) P Nyborg	4	**7**	5
(Canada) R Simpson (Canada) D Nestor	3	2
2	(United States) **L Raymond** (United States) **P Galbraith**	**6**	**6**

Second round
WC	(Australia) **N Bradtke** (Australia) **J Eagle**	**6**	**6**
(France) A Dechaume-Balleret (United States) J Grabb	3	0
(Latvia) **L Neiland** (South Africa) **J-L de Jager**	**6**	**7^{7}**
4	(Czech Republic) H Suková (Czech Republic) C Suk	3	6^{2}
(United States) K Po (United States) J Waite	**7^{7}**	4	0
(Russia) **A Kournikova** (The Bahamas) **M Knowles**	6^{1}	**6**	**6**
(Australia) K-A Guse (South Africa) P Norval	1	0
2	(United States) **L Raymond** (United States) **P Galbraith**	**6**	**6**

Quarterfinals
WC	(Australia) N Bradtke (Australia) J Eagle	4	**6**	4
(Latvia) **L Neiland** (South Africa) **J-L de Jager**	**6**	2	**6**
(Russia) **A Kournikova** (The Bahamas) **M Knowles**	**6**	**7^{7}**
2	(United States) L Raymond (United States) P Galbraith	4	6^{4}

Semifinals
(Latvia) **L Neiland** (South Africa) **J-L de Jager**	**6**	**6**
(Russia) A Kournikova (The Bahamas) M Knowles	4	3
