= 1997 Australian Open – Men's doubles =

Tennis tournament

Men's doubles
- 1997 Australian Open

Final
- Champions: (Australia) Todd Woodbridge (Australia) Mark Woodforde
- Runners-up: (Canada) Sébastien Lareau (United States) Alex O'Brien
- Score: 4–6, 7–5, 7–5, 6–3

Details
- Draw: 64
- Seeds: 16

Events
Singles	men	women		boys	girls
Doubles	men	women	mixed	boys	girls
WC Singles	men	women	quad
WC Doubles	men	women	quad
Legends	men	women	mixed
- Australian Open

Todd Woodbridge and Mark Woodforde defeated Sébastien Lareau and Alex O'Brien in the final, 4–6, 7–5, 7–5, 6–3 to win the men's doubles tennis title at the 1997 Australian Open. It was the Woodies' second and last Australian Open title.

Stefan Edberg and Petr Korda were the reigning champions, but Edberg did not compete that year. Korda partnered Pat Cash, but lost in the second round to Neil Broad and Piet Norval.

== Seeds ==
Champion seeds are indicated in bold text while text in italics indicates the round in which those seeds were eliminated.

1. (Australia) **Todd Woodbridge / (Australia) Mark Woodforde (champions)**
2. (Zimbabwe) Byron Black / (Canada) Grant Connell (third round)
3. (Netherlands) Jacco Eltingh / (Netherlands) Paul Haarhuis (semifinals)
4. (South Africa) Ellis Ferreira / (United States) Patrick Galbraith (quarterfinals)
5. (The Bahamas) Mark Knowles / (Canada) Daniel Nestor (quarterfinals)
6. (Sweden) Jonas Björkman / (Sweden) Nicklas Kulti (third round)
7. (Canada) Sébastien Lareau / (United States) Alex O'Brien (final)
8. (United States) Jim Grabb / (United States) Richey Reneberg (third round)
9. (Belgium) Libor Pimek / (South Africa) Byron Talbot (first round)
10. (Czech Republic) Martin Damm / (Russia) Andrei Olhovskiy (quarterfinals)
11. (United States) Rick Leach / (United States) Jonathan Stark (semifinals)
12. (Argentina) Luis Lobo / (Spain) Javier Sánchez (third round)
13. (South Africa) David Adams / (Netherlands) Menno Oosting (first round)
14. Unknown (withdrew)
15. (Czech Republic) Jiří Novák / (Czech Republic) Cyril Suk (second round)
16. (United Kingdom) Neil Broad / (South Africa) Piet Norval (quarterfinals)

== Draw ==
Key

- Q = Qualifier
- WC = Wild card
- LL = Lucky loser
- Alt = Alternate
- ITF = ITF entry
- PR = Protected ranking
- SR = Special ranking
- SE = Special exempt
- JE = Junior exempt
- JR = Junior Accelerator Programme entrant
- CO = College Accelerator Programme entrant
- NG = Next Gen Accelerator Program entrant
- w/o = Walkover
- r = Retired
- d = Defaulted

=== Finals ===
Quarterfinals
1	(Australia) **Todd Woodbridge** **(Australia) Mark Woodforde**	**6**	**6**	**6**
10	(Czech Republic) Martin Damm (Russia) Andrei Olhovskiy	3	3	3
4	(South Africa) Ellis Ferreira (United States) Patrick Galbraith	5	**6**	4	6^{5}
11	(United States) **Rick Leach** **(United States) Jonathan Stark**	**7**	2	**6**	**7**
5	(The Bahamas) Mark Knowles (Canada) Daniel Nestor	3	**6**	2	**6**	3
3	(Netherlands) **Jacco Eltingh** **(Netherlands) Paul Haarhuis**	**6**	1	**6**	2	**6**
7	(Canada) **Sébastien Lareau** **(United States) Alex O'Brien**	3	**6**	**6**	**7**
16	(United Kingdom) Neil Broad (South Africa) Piet Norval	**6**	3	4	5

Semifinals
1	(Australia) **Todd Woodbridge** **(Australia) Mark Woodforde**	**6**	**7**	5	**6**
11	(United States) Rick Leach (United States) Jonathan Stark	3	6^{2}	**7**	1
3	(Netherlands) Jacco Eltingh (Netherlands) Paul Haarhuis	**6**	2	4	**7**	2
7	(Canada) **Sébastien Lareau** **(United States) Alex O'Brien**	4	**6**	**6**	5	**6**

Final
1	(Australia) **Todd Woodbridge** **(Australia) Mark Woodforde**	4	**7**	**7**	**6**
7	(Canada) Sébastien Lareau (United States) Alex O'Brien	**6**	5	5	3

=== Top half ===
==== Section 1 ====
First round
1	(Australia) **T Woodbridge** **(Australia) M Woodforde**	**6**	**7**
(Australia) A Kratzmann (Australia) M Tebbutt	3	6^{6}
(United States) **D Flach** **(United States) TJ Middleton**	**6**	**6**
(South Africa) C Ferreira (Hungary) G Köves	3	4
(United States) **D Johnson** **(United States) F Montana**	**7**	6^{8}	**11**
(Sweden) D Ekerot (United States) J Tarango	6^{5}	**7**	9
15	(Czech Republic) **J Novák** **(Czech Republic) C Suk**	**7**	4	**6**
(Netherlands) HJ Davids (Netherlands) S Schalken	5	**6**	4
10	(Czech Republic) **M Damm** **(Russia) A Olhovskiy**	1	**6**	**6**
(United States) B Hansen-Dent (United States) B MacPhie	**6**	3	4
(Socialist Federal Republic of Yugoslavia) **N Djordjevic** **(North Macedonia) A Kitinov**	**6**	**7**
(France) J-P Fleurian (Venezuela) N Pereira	3	5
(United States) **G Grant** **(The Bahamas) R Smith**	**6**	**6**
(Sweden) R Bergh (United States) G Van Emburgh	3	4
8	(United States) **J Grabb** **(United States) R Reneberg**	**6**	**6**
(Australia) J Crabb (Australia) T Larkham	4	2

Second round
1	(Australia) **T Woodbridge** **(Australia) M Woodforde**	**6**	3	**6**
(United States) D Flach (United States) TJ Middleton	0	**6**	1
(United States) **D Johnson** **(United States) F Montana**	**6**	**7**
15	(Czech Republic) J Novák (Czech Republic) C Suk	4	6^{3}
10	(Czech Republic) **M Damm** **(Russia) A Olhovskiy**	**6**	**6**
(Socialist Federal Republic of Yugoslavia) N Djordjevic (North Macedonia) A Kitinov	4	4
(United States) G Grant (The Bahamas) R Smith	4	6^{4}
8	(United States) **J Grabb** **(United States) R Reneberg**	**6**	**7**

Third round
1	(Australia) **T Woodbridge** **(Australia) M Woodforde**	**6**	**6**
(United States) D Johnson (United States) F Montana	1	1
10	(Czech Republic) **M Damm** **(Russia) A Olhovskiy**	5	**6**	**6**
8	(United States) J Grabb (United States) R Reneberg	**7**	4	3

Quarterfinals
1	(Australia) **T Woodbridge** **(Australia) M Woodforde**	**6**	**6**	**6**
10	(Czech Republic) M Damm (Russia) A Olhovskiy	3	3	3

==== Section 2 ====
First round
4	(South Africa) **E Ferreira** **(United States) P Galbraith**	**6**	**6**
(Czech Republic) C Doseděl (Czech Republic) P Vízner	3	0
(United States) **P McEnroe** **(Australia) S Stolle**	**6**	6^{1}	**6**
(Croatia) G Ivanišević (Switzerland) M Rosset	3	**7**	1
(United States) **K Thorne** **(United States) J Waite**	**7**	4	**6**
(Australia) B Ellwood (Australia) P Tramacchi	6^{1}	**6**	4
(Netherlands) **S Noteboom** **(Netherlands) F Wibier**	**7**	**6**
13	(South Africa) D Adams (Netherlands) M Oosting	6^{4}	3
11	(United States) **R Leach** **(United States) J Stark**	**6**	**6**
(Australia) T Mitchell (Australia) G Silcock	0	4
(United Kingdom) **M Petchey** **(United Kingdom) A Richardson**	**6**	**6**
(Argentina) J Frana (United States) B Shelton	2	4
(United States) **K Jones** **(United States) S Melville**	3	**6**	**6**
(Spain) T Carbonell (Spain) À Corretja	**6**	4	4
6	(Sweden) **J Björkman** **(Sweden) N Kulti**	**6**	**6**
(United States) B Behrens (United States) S Cannon	4	3

Second round
4	(South Africa) **E Ferreira** **(United States) P Galbraith**	**7**	**6**
(United States) P McEnroe (Australia) S Stolle	5	4
(United States) K Thorne (United States) J Waite	**6**	4	2
(Netherlands) **S Noteboom** **(Netherlands) F Wibier**	4	**6**	**6**
11	(United States) **R Leach** **(United States) J Stark**	**6**	**6**
(United Kingdom) M Petchey (United Kingdom) A Richardson	3	4
(United States) K Jones (United States) S Melville	0^{r}
6	(Sweden) **J Björkman** **(Sweden) N Kulti**	2

Third round
4	(South Africa) **E Ferreira** **(United States) P Galbraith**	**6**	**6**
(Netherlands) S Noteboom (Netherlands) F Wibier	3	4
11	(United States) **R Leach** **(United States) J Stark**	**6**	6^{6}	**6**
6	(Sweden) J Björkman (Sweden) N Kulti	3	**7**	1

Quarterfinals
4	(South Africa) E Ferreira (United States) P Galbraith	5	**6**	4	6^{5}
11	(United States) **R Leach** **(United States) J Stark**	**7**	2	**6**	**7**

=== Bottom half ===
==== Section 3 ====
First round
5	(The Bahamas) **M Knowles** **(Canada) D Nestor**	**6**	**6**
(Australia) J Eagle (Australia) A Florent	4	3
(Australia) **S Draper** **(New Zealand) B Steven**	**6**	**6**
(United Kingdom) T Henman (Netherlands) J Siemerink	3	4
(Australia) **W Arthurs** **(Australia) J Ireland**	**6**	3	29
(Italy) C Brandi (Italy) F Messori	3	**6**	27
12	(Argentina) **L Lobo** **(Spain) J Sánchez**	**7**	5	**6**
(Australia) J Fitzgerald (Australia) P Rafter	5	**7**	4
(Germany) **M-K Goellner** **(Germany) D Prinosil**	**6**	**6**
(Brazil) G Kuerten (Brazil) F Meligeni	3	4
(United States) **K Kinnear** **(United States) C Woodruff**	**7**	**6**
(Australia) A Belobrajdic (Australia) G Doyle	6^{2}	3
(South Africa) **M Ondruska** **(South Africa) G Stafford**	**6**	**7**
(Germany) K Braasch (Germany) J Knippschild	1	5
3	(Netherlands) **J Eltingh** **(Netherlands) P Haarhuis**	**7**	**7**
(South Africa) M Barnard (United States) D Randall	6^{2}	6^{5}

Second round
5	(The Bahamas) **M Knowles** **(Canada) D Nestor**	**7**	**7**
(Australia) Scott Draper (New Zealand) Brett Steven	6^{2}	6^{5}
(Australia) W Arthurs (Australia) J Ireland	2	0
12	(Argentina) **L Lobo** **(Spain) J Sánchez**	**6**	**6**
(Germany) M-K Goellner (Germany) D Prinosil
(United States) **K Kinnear** **(United States) C Woodruff**	w/o
(South Africa) M Ondruska (South Africa) G Stafford	3	4
3	(Netherlands) **J Eltingh** **(Netherlands) P Haarhuis**	**6**	**6**

Third round
5	(The Bahamas) **M Knowles** **(Canada) D Nestor**	**6**	**6**
12	(Argentina) L Lobo (Spain) J Sánchez	4	3
(United States) K Kinnear (United States) C Woodruff	0	4
3	(Netherlands) **J Eltingh** **(Netherlands) P Haarhuis**	**6**	**6**

Quarterfinals
5	(The Bahamas) M Knowles (Canada) D Nestor	3	**6**	2	**6**	3
3	(Netherlands) **J Eltingh** **(Netherlands) P Haarhuis**	**6**	1	**6**	2	**6**

==== Section 4 ====
First round
7	(Canada) **S Lareau** **(United States) A O'Brien**	4	**6**	**6**
(South Africa) B Haygarth (Belarus) M Mirnyi	**6**	3	0
(United States) **S Davis** **(Australia) D Macpherson**	**6**	**6**
(Italy) A Gaudenzi (Italy) D Nargiso	1	4
(Netherlands) **T Kempers** **(Netherlands) T Nijssen**	4	**6**	**6**
(South Africa) J-L de Jager (South Africa) C van Rensburg	**6**	3	4
(Argentina) **P Albano** **(Sweden) P Nyborg**	**7**	**6**
9	(Belgium) L Pimek (South Africa) B Talbot	5	4
16	(United Kingdom) **N Broad** **(South Africa) P Norval**	**7**	**6**
(United States) M Keil (Canada) S Leblanc	5	3
(Australia) **P Cash** **(Czech Republic) P Korda**	**6**	**6**
(India) M Bhupathi (India) L Paes	3	2
(South Africa) **G Muller** **(Zimbabwe) K Ullyett**	**6**	3	**6**
(Australia) J Holmes (Australia) A Painter	3	**6**	1
2	(Zimbabwe) **B Black** **(Canada) G Connell**	**6**	**6**
(United States) L Jensen (United States) M Jensen	0	4

Second round
7	(Canada) **S Lareau** **(United States) A O'Brien**	**6**	**6**
(United States) S Davis (Australia) D Macpherson	4	2
(Netherlands) **T Kempers** **(Netherlands) T Nijssen**	**6**	1	**6**
(Argentina) P Albano (Sweden) P Nyborg	2	**6**	1
16	(United Kingdom) **N Broad** **(South Africa) P Norval**	6^{2}	**7**	**6**
(Australia) P Cash (Czech Republic) P Korda	**7**	6^{4}	3
(South Africa) G Muller (Zimbabwe) K Ullyett	5	2
2	(Zimbabwe) **B Black** **(Canada) G Connell**	**7**	**6**

Third round
7	(Canada) **S Lareau** **(United States) A O'Brien**	**6**	**6**
(Netherlands) T Kempers (Netherlands) T Nijssen	3	0
16	(United Kingdom) **N Broad** **(South Africa) P Norval**	4	**6**	**6**
2	(Zimbabwe) B Black (Canada) G Connell	**6**	3	4

Quarterfinals
7	(Canada) **S Lareau** **(United States) A O'Brien**	3	**6**	**6**
16	(United Kingdom) N Broad (South Africa) P Norval	**6**	3	4
