= 1997 Australian Open – Women's singles =

Women's singles
- 1997 Australian Open

Final
- Champion: (Switzerland) Martina Hingis
- Runner-up: (France) Mary Pierce
- Score: 6–2, 6–2

Details
- Draw: 128
- Seeds: 16

Events
Singles	men	women		boys	girls
Doubles	men	women	mixed	boys	girls
WC Singles	men	women	quad
WC Doubles	men	women	quad
Legends	men	women	mixed
- Australian Open

Martina Hingis defeated Mary Pierce in the final, 6–2, 6–2 to win the women's singles tennis title at the 1997 Australian Open. It was her first major singles title, becoming the first Swiss to win a singles major. Hingis did not lose a set during the tournament. At the age of 16 years and three months, she remains the youngest woman to win a major singles title in the Open Era, and the youngest since Lottie Dod at the 1887 Wimbledon Championships.

Monica Seles was the reigning champion, but did not compete that year.

Steffi Graf's 45-match major winning streak ended (dating to the 1995 French Open) when she was defeated by Amanda Coetzer in the fourth round.

== Seeds ==
1. (Germany) Steffi Graf (fourth round)
2. (Spain) Arantxa Sánchez Vicario (third round)
3. (Spain) Conchita Martínez (fourth round)
4. (Switzerland) Martina Hingis (champion)
5. (Germany) Anke Huber (fourth round)
6. (Croatia) Iva Majoli (first round)
7. (United States) Lindsay Davenport (fourth round)
8. (Romania) Irina Spîrlea (quarterfinals)
9. (Slovakia) Karina Habšudová (fourth round)
10. (Netherlands) Brenda Schultz-McCarthy (second round)
11. (Austria) Judith Wiesner (first round)
12. (South Africa) Amanda Coetzer (semifinals)
13. (Russia) Elena Likhovtseva (first round)
14. (United States) Mary Joe Fernández (semifinals)
15. (United States) Chanda Rubin (fourth round)
16. (Belgium) Sabine Appelmans (quarterfinals)

== Draw ==
Key

- Q = Qualifier
- WC = Wild card
- LL = Lucky loser
- Alt = Alternate
- ITF = ITF entry
- PR = Protected ranking
- SR = Special ranking
- SE = Special exempt
- JE = Junior exempt
- JR = Junior Accelerator Programme entrant
- CO = College Accelerator Programme entrant
- NG = Next Gen Accelerator Program entrant
- w/o = Walkover
- r = Retired
- d = Defaulted

=== Finals ===
Quarterfinals
12	(South Africa) Amanda Coetzer	6	6
(United States) Kimberly Po	4	1
16	(Belgium) Sabine Appelmans	6	4	4
(France) Mary Pierce	1	6	6
8	(Romania) Irina Spîrlea	5	2
4	(Switzerland) Martina Hingis	7	6
14	(United States) Mary Joe Fernández	7	4
(Belgium) Dominique Van Roost	5	0^{r}

Semifinals
12	(South Africa) Amanda Coetzer	5	1
(France) Mary Pierce	7	6
4	(Switzerland) Martina Hingis	6	6
14	(United States) Mary Joe Fernández	1	3

Final
(France) Mary Pierce	2	2
4	(Switzerland) Martina Hingis	6	6

=== Top half ===
==== Section 1 ====
First round
1	(Germany) S Graf	5
(Slovakia) J Husárová	1^{r}
WC	(Australia) E Dominikovic	2	7^{7}	0
(Latvia) L Neiland	6	6^{2}	6
(Argentina) I Gorrochategui	6	6
WC	(Australia) B Stewart	2	1
(Belgium) E Callens	4	3
(United States) G Fernández	6	6
(United States) L Lee	2	6	6
(Slovenia) B Mulej	6	3	2
Q	(Spain) M Serna	6	6^{6}	7
Q	(Japan) M Saeki	3	7^{8}	5
(Germany) J Kandarr	6	3	6
(Japan) K Nagatsuka	3	6	3
(Russia) A Kournikova	2	2
12	(South Africa) A Coetzer	6	6

Second round
1	(Germany) S Graf	7	6
(Latvia) L Neiland	5	2
(Argentina) I Gorrochategui	7	7^{7}
(United States) G Fernández	5	6^{3}
(United States) L Lee	5	6^{2}
Q	(Spain) M Serna	7	7^{7}
(Germany) J Kandarr	2	6^{4}
12	(South Africa) A Coetzer	6	7^{7}

Third round
1	(Germany) S Graf	7	6
(Argentina) I Gorrochategui	5	3
Q	(Spain) M Serna	3	2
12	(South Africa) A Coetzer	6	6

Fourth round
1	(Germany) S Graf	2	5
12	(South Africa) A Coetzer	6	7

==== Section 2 ====
First round
10	(Netherlands) B Schultz-McCarthy	6	2	6
(South Korea) S-h Park	2	6	2
(Japan) R Hiraki	6	2	6
(Czech Republic) L Richterová	4	6	4
(Spain) G León García	6	6^{4}	2
(United States) K Po	4	7^{7}	6
(Romania) C Cristea	6^{3}	4
(Japan) A Sugiyama	7^{7}	6
WC	(Australia) J Taylor	7	4	7
(Spain) M Sánchez Lorenzo	5	6	5
(Thailand) T Tanasugarn	6	1	6
(Russia) E Makarova	3	6	4
(Slovakia) K Studeníková	4	6^{1}
(Italy) F Perfetti	6	7^{7}
(France) N Dechy	6	1	1
7	(United States) L Davenport	4	6	6

Second round
10	(Netherlands) B Schultz-McCarthy	6	1	4
(Japan) R Hiraki	0	6	6
(United States) K Po	6	4	6
(Japan) A Sugiyama	0	6	3
WC	(Australia) J Taylor	4	3
(Thailand) T Tanasugarn	6	6
(Italy) F Perfetti	2	5
7	(United States) L Davenport	6	7

Third round
(Japan) R Hiraki	2	2
(United States) K Po	6	6
(Thailand) T Tanasugarn	1	0
7	(United States) L Davenport	6	6

Fourth round
(United States) K Po	7^{15}	6
7	(United States) L Davenport	6^{13}	4

==== Section 3 ====
First round
3	(Spain) C Martínez	6	6
(Netherlands) M Oremans	0	2
(Austria) S Dopfer	6^{7}	2
(Czech Republic) A Gerši	7^{9}	6
(Sweden) Å Carlsson	6	6
(Czech Republic) P Langrová	3	2
(Canada) P Hy-Boulais	6	2	6
(France) A Dechaume-Balleret	0	6	4
(United States) N Arendt	6	3	4
(Netherlands) K Boogert	3	6	6
(Italy) R Grande	6	6
(Spain) Á Montolio	2	4
(United States) A Grossman	7	6
(United States) A Miller	5	2
(Czech Republic) H Suková	2	2
16	(Belgium) S Appelmans	6	6

Second round
3	(Spain) C Martínez	6	7^{8}
(Czech Republic) A Gerši	2	6^{6}
(Sweden) Å Carlsson	2	6	6
(Canada) P Hy-Boulais	6	3	0
(Netherlands) K Boogert	6	7
(Italy) R Grande	3	5
(United States) A Grossman	4	1
16	(Belgium) S Appelmans	6	6

Third round
3	(Spain) C Martínez	6	6
(Sweden) Å Carlsson	0	1
(Netherlands) K Boogert	1	0	r
16	(Belgium) S Appelmans	6	3

Fourth round
3	(Spain) C Martínez	6	5	1
16	(Belgium) S Appelmans	2	7	6

==== Section 4 ====
First round
13	(Russia) E Likhovtseva	6	2	4
(France) M Pierce	3	6	6
WC	(China) L-L Chen	2	6	3
(Ukraine) N Medvedeva	6	3	6
Q	(Germany) M Kochta	4	7^{7}	6
(United States) M Werdel-Witmeyer	6	6^{4}	0
WC	(Australia) A Ellwood	6	6
(United States) L McNeil	3	2
(Belarus) N Zvereva	7^{11}	6
(Belgium) N Feber	6^{9}	1
(United States) S Cacic	4	6	5
(Germany) W Probst	6	2	7
(Italy) F Lubiani	6	7^{7}
WC	(Australia) R McQuillan	2	6^{4}
(United States) A Frazier	6	2	5
5	(Germany) A Huber	0	6	7

Second round
(France) M Pierce	6	6
(Ukraine) N Medvedeva	2	2
Q	(Germany) M Kochta	6	4	6
WC	(Australia) A Ellwood	0	6	1
(Belarus) N Zvereva	7^{7}	6
(Germany) W Probst	6^{5}	3
(Italy) F Lubiani	6	2	0
5	(Germany) A Huber	4	6	6

Third round
(France) M Pierce	6	6
Q	(Germany) M Kochta	0	2
(Belarus) N Zvereva	5	0
5	(Germany) A Huber	7	6

Fourth round
(France) M Pierce	6	6
5	(Germany) A Huber	2	3

=== Bottom half ===
==== Section 5 ====
First round
8	(Romania) I Spîrlea	6	6
(Japan) N Kijimuta	2	4
(South Africa) J Kruger	6	2	6
(Madagascar) D Randriantefy	3	6	2
(Argentina) P Suárez	7^{11}	6
(Austria) K Kschwendt	6^{9}	3
(Poland) A Olsza	3	2
(Italy) S Farina	6	6
(United States) J Capriati	2	6	4
(United States) J Watanabe	6	3	6
(Chinese Taipei) S-t Wang	6	6
(United States) L Wild	3	1
(United States) C Morariu	3	2
(Australia) N Bradtke	6	6
(Croatia) S Talaja	1	2
9	(Slovakia) K Habšudová	6	6

Second round
8	(Romania) I Spîrlea	6	6
(South Africa) J Kruger	1	1
(Argentina) P Suárez	4	1
(Italy) S Farina	6	6
(United States) J Watanabe	5	3
(Chinese Taipei) S-t Wang	7	6
(Australia) N Bradtke	3	3
9	(Slovakia) K Habšudová	6	6

Third round
8	(Romania) I Spîrlea	6	6
(Italy) S Farina	1	3
(Chinese Taipei) S-t Wang	3	6^{5}
9	(Slovakia) K Habšudová	6	7^{7}

Fourth round
8	(Romania) I Spîrlea	6	6
9	(Slovakia) K Habšudová	4	4

==== Section 6 ====
First round
11	(Austria) J Wiesner	6	3	8
(Romania) R Dragomir	4	6	10
(Spain) V Ruano Pascual	6	3	6
(Spain) C Torrens Valero	0	6	3
(Germany) S Hack	6	3	2
LL	(France) N van Lottum	4	6	6
(Germany) P Begerow	1	1
Q	(Puerto Rico) K Brandi	6	6
(United States) G Helgeson-Nielsen	2	2
(France) A Fusai	6	6
(Austria) B Schett	7^{10}	7^{8}
(Japan) N Miyagi	6^{8}	6^{6}
WC	(Australia) S Drake-Brockman	2	2
(United States) L Raymond	6	6
(Germany) B Rittner	1	5
4	(Switzerland) M Hingis	6	7

Second round
(Romania) R Dragomir	7^{7}	6
(Spain) V Ruano Pascual	6^{3}	1
LL	(France) N van Lottum	0	6	4
Q	(Puerto Rico) K Brandi	6	1	6
(France) A Fusai	6	5	5
(Austria) B Schett	2	7	7
(United States) L Raymond	4	2
4	(Switzerland) M Hingis	6	6

Third round
(Romania) R Dragomir	6	6
Q	(Puerto Rico) K Brandi	1	1
(Austria) B Schett	2	1
4	(Switzerland) M Hingis	6	6

Fourth round
(Romania) R Dragomir	6^{6}	1
4	(Switzerland) M Hingis	7^{8}	6

==== Section 7 ====
First round
6	(Croatia) I Majoli	5	1
(Switzerland) P Schnyder	7	6
WC	(Australia) K Radford	5	1
(Japan) M Endo	7	6
Q	(United States) M Tu	3	6	6
(Czech Republic) L Cenková	6	2	3
Q	(Poland) M Grzybowska	4	6	6
(France) S Pitkowski	6	3	1
(Argentina) F Labat	7	4	6
(Luxembourg) A Kremer	5	6	2
(Slovakia) H Nagyová	6	7^{7}
(Switzerland) E Gagliardi	3	6^{3}
(Indonesia) Y Basuki	6	4
(Japan) N Sawamatsu	3	1	r
Q	(Italy) L Golarsa	2	6	2
14	(United States) MJ Fernández	6	4	6

Second round
(Switzerland) P Schnyder	6	6
(Japan) M Endo	0	4
Q	(United States) M Tu	4	7^{7}	1
Q	(Poland) M Grzybowska	6	6^{3}	6
(Argentina) F Labat	3	2
(Slovakia) H Nagyová	6	6
(Indonesia) Y Basuki	5	4
14	(United States) MJ Fernández	7	6

Third round
(Switzerland) P Schnyder	7^{7}	6
Q	(Poland) M Grzybowska	6^{4}	1
(Slovakia) H Nagyová	2	1
14	(United States) MJ Fernández	6	6

Fourth round
(Switzerland) P Schnyder	6	4	1
14	(United States) MJ Fernández	4	6	6

==== Section 8 ====
First round
15	(United States) C Rubin	7^{7}	6
(Slovakia) R Zrubáková	6^{2}	3
(France) S Testud	6	6
(Germany) E Wagner	3	1
LL	(Czech Republic) S Kleinová	7^{14}	6
(United States) T Whitlinger-Jones	6^{12}	1
(France) A-G Sidot	5	7	6
(Federal Republic of Yugoslavia) T Ječmenica	7	5	4
(United States) K Adams	5	3
Q	(Japan) Y Yoshida	7	6
(Argentina) B Fulco-Villella	0	3
(Belgium) D Van Roost	6	6
(Czech Republic) D Chládková	3	7^{7}	6
(Belgium) S Devillé	6	6^{2}	8
(Italy) G Pizzichini	4	4
2	(Spain) A Sánchez Vicario	6	6

Second round
15	(United States) C Rubin	6	6
(France) S Testud	2	1
LL	(Czech Republic) S Kleinová	6	4	8
(France) A-G Sidot	4	6	6
Q	(Japan) Y Yoshida	6	5	3
(Belgium) D Van Roost	4	7	6
(Belgium) S Devillé	0	r
2	(Spain) A Sánchez Vicario	1

Third round
15	(United States) C Rubin	6	6
LL	(Czech Republic) S Kleinová	1	3
(Belgium) D Van Roost	1	6	8
2	(Spain) A Sánchez Vicario	6	4	6

Fourth round
15	(United States) C Rubin	5	4
(Belgium) D Van Roost	7	6

Preceded by 1996 US Open – Women's singles	Grand Slam women's singles	Succeeded by 1997 French Open – Women's singles
