= 1985 Sunkist WTA Championships =

1985 WITA Championships
- Date: April 15–21
- Edition: 6th
- Category: Category 4
- Draw: 56S / 28D
- Prize money: $250,000
- Surface: Clay / outdoor
- Location: Amelia Island, Florida, U.S
- Venue: Amelia Island Plantation

Champions

Singles
- (United States) Zina Garrison

Doubles
- (South Africa) Rosalyn Fairbank (Czechoslovakia) Hana Mandlíková
- Amelia Island Championships

The 1985 Sunkist Women's Tennis Association (WTA) Championships was a women's tennis tournament played on outdoor clay courts at the Amelia Island Plantation on Amelia Island, Florida, United States. The tournament was part of the Category 4 tier of the 1985 WTA Tour. It was the sixth edition of the tournament and was held from April 15 through April 21, 1985. Zina Garrison won the singles title and earned $32,000 first-prize money.

== Finals ==
=== Singles ===
(United States) Zina Garrison defeated (United States) Chris Evert-Lloyd 6–4, 6–3

- It was Garrison's 1st singles title of the year and the 2nd of her career.

=== Doubles ===
(South Africa) Rosalyn Fairbank / (Czechoslovakia) Hana Mandlíková defeated (Canada) Carling Bassett / (United States) Chris Evert-Lloyd 6–1, 2–6, 6–2

- It was Fairbank's 2nd doubles title of the year and the 11th of her career. It was Mandlíková's 2nd doubles title of the year and the 9th of her career.
