= Annika Narbe =

Swedish tennis player

- Country (sports): Sweden
- Born: 9 October 1971 (age 54)
- Prize money: $31,253

Singles
- Career record: 75–61
- Career titles: 2 ITF
- Highest ranking: No. 224 (16 November 1992)

Doubles
- Career record: 52–39
- Career titles: 5 ITF
- Highest ranking: No. 216 (11 November 1991)

Annika Narbe (born 9 October 1971) is a Swedish former professional tennis player.

Narbe, who comes from Malmö, reached a career best singles ranking of 224 on the professional tour, twice featuring in the main draw of the Swedish Open. She won two ITF singles titles and five ITF doubles titles.

A Swedish national champion in 1992 and 1993, she is the mother of professional tennis player Philip Möbius.

== ITF finals ==
Legend
$25,000 tournaments
$10,000 tournaments

=== Singles: 6 (2–4) ===
Result	No.	Date	Tournament	Surface	Opponent	Score
Loss	1.	19 November 1989	Kyoto, Japan	Hard	(Japan) Emiko Okagawa	3–6, 1–6
Win	1.	9 June 1991	Viana do Castelo, Portugal	Clay	(Netherlands) Hanneke Ketelaars	3–6, 6–4, 6–2
Loss	2.	16 June 1991	Cascais, Portugal	Clay	(France) Barbara Collet	4–6, 3–6
Loss	3.	30 June 1991	Ronneby, Sweden	Clay	(Denmark) Sofie Albinus	2–6, 3–6
Win	2.	19 July 1992	Vigo, Spain	Clay	(Japan) Misumi Miyauchi	6–3, 6–3
Loss	4.	30 January 1994	Stockholm, Sweden	Hard	(Germany) Michaela Seibold	4–6, 3–6

=== Doubles: 8 (5–3) ===
Result	No.	Date	Tournament	Surface	Partner	Opponents	Score
Loss	1.	27 August 1989	Neumünster, West Germany	Clay	(Sweden) Catarina Bernstein	(Greece) Julia Apostoli (Soviet Union) Agnese Gustmane	1–6, 2–6
Win	1.	6 May 1990	Lee-on-the-Solent, UK	Clay	(Sweden) Catarina Bernstein	(Soviet Union) Svetlana Komleva (Soviet Union) Natalia Biletskaya	6–4, 6–4
Loss	2.	16 September 1990	Agliana, Italy	Clay	(Sweden) Catarina Bernstein	(Italy) Giovanna Carotenuto (Italy) Cristina Salvi	5–7, 6–3, 6–7
Win	2.	21 April 1991	Athens, Greece	Clay	(Sweden) Catarina Bernstein	(Canada) Suzanne Italiano (Greece) Christina Zachariadou	5–7, 7–5, 7–5
Loss	3.	16 June 1991	Cascais, Portugal	Clay	(Sweden) Marie Linusson	(Netherlands) Rieneke Kusters (France) Barbara Collet	3–6, 6–3, 2–6
Win	3.	4 August 1991	Rheda, Germany	Clay	(Sweden) Catarina Bernstein	(Romania) Irina Spîrlea (Germany) Meike Babel	6–4, 7–5
Win	4.	26 January 1992	Bergen, Norway	Carpet	(Sweden) Catarina Bernstein	(Norway) Amy Jönsson Raaholt (Sweden) Cecilia Dahlman	6–1, 6–4
Win	5.	5 July 1992	Ronneby, Sweden	Clay	(Sweden) Catarina Bernstein	(Australia) Clare Thompson (Australia) Robyn Mawdsley	7–5, 6–0
