= 1997 Australian Open =

- Date: 13–26 January 1997
- Edition: 85th
- Category: Grand Slam (ITF)
- Surface: Hardcourt (Rebound Ace)
- Location: Melbourne, Australia
- Venue: Melbourne Park

Champions

Men's singles
- (United States) Pete Sampras

Women's singles
- (Switzerland) Martina Hingis

Men's doubles
- (Australia) Todd Woodbridge / (Australia) Mark Woodforde

Women's doubles
- (Switzerland) Martina Hingis / (Belarus) Natasha Zvereva

Mixed doubles
- (Netherlands) Manon Bollegraf / (United States) Rick Leach

Boys' singles
- (Germany) Daniel Elsner

Girls' singles
- (Croatia) Mirjana Lučić

Boys' doubles
- (United Kingdom) David Sherwood / (United Kingdom) James Trotman

Girls' doubles
- (Croatia) Mirjana Lučić / (Germany) Jasmin Wöhr
- Australian Open

The 1997 Australian Open was a tennis tournament played on outdoor hard courts at Melbourne Park in Melbourne in Victoria in Australia. It was the 85th edition of the Australian Open and was held from 13 through 26 January 1997.

Prior to the 2021 US Open, this was the last Grand Slam tournament not to feature Roger Federer, Rafael Nadal, Serena Williams, or Venus Williams in the main singles draw.

== Seniors ==
=== Men's singles ===
(United States) Pete Sampras defeated (Spain) Carlos Moyá 6–2, 6–3, 6–3

- It was Sampras' 9th career Grand Slam title and his 2nd and last Australian Open title.

=== Women's singles ===
(Switzerland) Martina Hingis defeated (France) Mary Pierce 6–2, 6–2

- It was Hingis' 1st career Grand Slam title and her 1st Australian Open title. Hingis became the first Swiss player – male or female – to win a Grand Slam singles title.

=== Men's doubles ===
(Australia) Todd Woodbridge / (Australia) Mark Woodforde defeated (Canada) Sébastien Lareau / (United States) Alex O'Brien 4–6, 7–5, 7–5, 6–3

- It was Woodbridge's 13th career Grand Slam title and his 3rd Australian Open title. It was Woodforde's 14th career Grand Slam title and his 4th and last Australian Open title.

=== Women's doubles ===
(Switzerland) Martina Hingis / (Belarus) Natasha Zvereva defeated (United States) Lindsay Davenport / (United States) Lisa Raymond 6–2, 6–2

- It was Hingis' 3rd career Grand Slam title and her 2nd Australian Open title. It was Zvereva's 18th career Grand Slam title and her 5th and last Australian Open title.

=== Mixed doubles ===
(Netherlands) Manon Bollegraf / (United States) Rick Leach defeated (Latvia) Larisa Neiland / (South Africa) John-Laffnie de Jager 6–3, 6–7^{(5–7)}, 7–5

- It was Bollegraf's 3rd career Grand Slam title and her only Australian Open title. It was Leach's 7th career Grand Slam title and his 4th Australian Open title.

== Juniors ==
=== Boys' singles ===
(Germany) Daniel Elsner defeated (South Africa) Wesley Whitehouse 7–6, 6–2

=== Girls' singles ===
(Croatia) Mirjana Lučić defeated (Germany) Marlene Weingärtner 6–2, 6–2

=== Boys' doubles ===
(United Kingdom) David Sherwood / (United Kingdom) James Trotman defeated (South Africa) Jaco van der Westhuizen / (South Africa) Wesley Whitehouse 7–6, 6–3

=== Girls' doubles ===
(Croatia) Mirjana Lučić / (Germany) Jasmin Wöhr defeated (South Korea) Cho Yoon-jeong / (Japan) Shiho Hisamatsu 6–2, 6–2

== Other events ==
=== Legends' doubles ===
(Australia) Peter McNamara / (Australia) Fred Stolle defeated (Australia) Mark Edmondson / (Australia) Ken Rosewall 6–4, 6–4

Preceded by 1996 US Open	Grand Slams	Succeeded by 1997 French Open
