= Michaela Seibold =

German former professional tennis player (born 1975)

- Country (sports): Germany
- Born: 15 August 1975 (age 50)
- Prize money: $27,716

Singles
- Career record: 63–61
- Career titles: 1 ITF
- Highest ranking: No. 223 (17 October 1994)

Doubles
- Career record: 34–27
- Career titles: 4 ITF
- Highest ranking: No. 261 (24 July 1995)

Michaela Seibold (born 15 August 1975) is a German former professional tennis player.

Seibold, who grew up in the Schleswig-Holstein town of Kuddewörde, reached a career high singles ranking of 223 while competing on the professional tour in the 1990s. Her only WTA Tour main draw appearance came in doubles, partnering Maja Palaveršić at the 1995 Amelia Island Championships.

== ITF finals ==
Legend
$25,000 tournaments
$10,000 tournaments

=== Singles: 3 (1–2) ===
Outcome	No.	Date	Tournament	Surface	Opponent	Score
Runner-up	1.	10 November 1991	ITF Ljusdal, Sweden	Carpet	(Sweden) Åsa Svensson	3–6, 2–6
Runner-up	2.	2 May 1993	ITF Bath, United Kingdom	Clay	(Czech Republic) Ludmila Richterová	2–6, 7–6, 3–6
Winner	1.	30 January 1994	ITF Stockholm, Sweden	Hard	(Sweden) Annika Narbe	6–4, 6–3

=== Doubles: 6 (4–2) ===
Outcome	No.	Date	Tournament	Surface	Partner	Opponents	Score
Winner	1.	6 September 1992	ITF Bad Nauheim, Germany	Clay	(Germany) Heike Roloff	(Poland) Agata Werblinska (Commonwealth of Independent States) Irina Zvereva	6–2, 6–4
Winner	2.	11 October 1992	ITF Flensburg, Germany	Carpet	(Germany) Heike Roloff	(Sweden) Alexandra Henningsson (Sweden) Anneli Ornstedt	6–1, 6–0
Winner	3.	31 January 1993	ITF Stockholm, Sweden	Carpet	(Germany) Claudia Timm	(Luxembourg) Christine Goy (Belgium) Vanessa Matthys	6–2, 5–7, 6–2
Runner-up	1.	24 October 1993	ITF Flensburg, Germany	Carpet	(Germany) Tanja Karsten	(Latvia) Agnese Blumberga (Russia) Eugenia Maniokova	3–6, 1–6
Runner-up	2.	30 January 1994	ITF Stockholm, Sweden	Hard	(Germany) Tanja Karsten	(Czech Republic) Gabriela Netikova (Denmark) Karin Ptaszek	3–6, 7–5, 0–6
Winner	4.	9 October 1994	ITF Nottingham, United Kingdom	Carpet	(Germany) Tanja Karsten	(United Kingdom) Ekaterina Roubanova (United Kingdom) Emily Bond	6–4, 3–6, 7–6
