= 1995 Bausch & Lomb Championships – Singles =

Singles
- 1995 Bausch & Lomb Championships

Final
- Champion: (Spain) Conchita Martínez
- Runner-up: (Argentina) Gabriela Sabatini
- Score: 6–1, 6–4

Details
- Draw: 56 (7 Q / 3 WC )
- Seeds: 16

Events
Singles	Doubles
- Amelia Island Championships

Arantxa Sánchez Vicario was the defending champion but did not compete that year.

Conchita Martínez won in the final 6–1, 6–4 against Gabriela Sabatini.

== Seeds ==
A champion seed is indicated in bold text while text in italics indicates the round in which that seed was eliminated. The top eight seeds received a bye to the second round.

1. (Spain) **Conchita Martínez (champion)**
2. (Argentina) Gabriela Sabatini (final)
3. (Bulgaria) Magdalena Maleeva (semifinals)
4. (Austria) Judith Wiesner (second round)
5. (South Africa) Amanda Coetzer (quarterfinals)
6. (Argentina) Inés Gorrochategui (quarterfinals)
7. (United States) Zina Garrison-Jackson (third round)
8. (Germany) Sabine Hack (semifinals)
9. (Romania) Irina Spîrlea (third round)
10. (Italy) Sandra Cecchini (second round)
11. (Belgium) Sabine Appelmans (first round)
12. (United States) Ann Grossman (first round)
13. (Netherlands) Miriam Oremans (second round)
14. (Latvia) Larisa Savchenko (first round)
15. (United States) Chanda Rubin (third round)
16. (Israel) Anna Smashnova (first round)

== Draw ==
Key

- Q = Qualifier
- WC = Wild card
- LL = Lucky loser
- Alt = Alternate
- ITF = ITF entry
- PR = Protected ranking
- SR = Special ranking
- SE = Special exempt
- JE = Junior exempt
- JR = Junior Accelerator Programme entrant
- CO = College Accelerator Programme entrant
- NG = Next Gen Accelerator Program entrant
- w/o = Walkover
- r = Retired
- d = Defaulted

=== Finals ===
Semifinals
1	(Spain) **Conchita Martínez**	**6**	**6**
3	(Bulgaria) Magdalena Maleeva	2	3
8	(Germany) Sabine Hack	3	2
2	(Argentina) **Gabriela Sabatini**	**6**	**6**

Final
1	(Spain) **Conchita Martínez**	**6**	**6**
2	(Argentina) Gabriela Sabatini	1	4

=== Top half ===
==== Section 1 ====
First round
(Germany) P Begerow	2	**6**	4
(Sweden) **Å Carlsson**	**6**	2	**6**
(South Africa) J Kruger	3	**6**	4
Q	(Spain) **N Ávila Bonastre**	**6**	3	**6**
(France) S Pitkowski	4	6
9	(Romania) **I Spîrlea**	**6**	**7**
14	(Latvia) L Savchenko	2	0	r
Q	(Spain) **V Ruano-Pascual**	**6**	**2**
(Canada) P Hy-Boulais	**6**	4	3
Q	(Russia) **E Maniokova**	2	**6**	**6**
LL	(Argentina) M Paz	1	3
(United States) **G Helgeson-Nielsen**	**6**	**6**

Second round
1	(Spain) **C Martínez**	**6**	**6**
(Sweden) Å Carlsson	1	2
Q	(Spain) N Ávila Bonastre	6	4
9	(Romania) **I Spîrlea**	**7**	**6**
Q	(Spain) **V Ruano-Pascual**	**6**	**6**
Q	(Russia) E Maniokova	2	2
(United States) G Helgeson-Nielsen
5	(South Africa) **A Coetzer**	**w/o**

Third round
1	(Spain) **C Martínez**	**6**	**6**
9	(Romania) I Spîrlea	1	1
Q	(Spain) V Ruano-Pascual	5	5
5	(South Africa) **A Coetzer**	**7**	**7**

Quarterfinals
1	(Spain) **C Martínez**	**7**	**6**
5	(South Africa) A Coetzer	5	0

==== Section 2 ====
First round
(France) A Fusai	2	0
(Romania) **R Dragomir**	**6**	**6**
(Italy) **A Serra Zanetti**	**7**	3	**6**
Q	(United Kingdom) R Viollet	6	**6**	4
Q	(Spain) C Torrens Valero	2	1
15	(United States) **C Rubin**	**6**	**6**
12	(United States) A Grossman	3	6
(Belgium) **L Courtois**	**6**	**7**
(United States) **N Arendt**	**7**	**6**
(Australia) R McQuillan	5	3
(Czech Republic) **R Bobková**	**6**	**7**
(United States) A Keller	3	6

Second round
3	(Bulgaria) **M Maleeva**	**7**	**6**
(Romania) R Dragomir	5	2
(Italy) A Serra Zanetti	2	1
15	(United States) **C Rubin**	**6**	**6**
(Belgium) **L Courtois**	**6**	**7**
(United States) N Arendt	2	6
(Czech Republic) R Bobková	2	2
7	(United States) **Z Garrison-Jackson**	**6**	**6**

Third round
3	(Bulgaria) **M Maleeva**	2	**6**	**6**
15	(United States) C Rubin	**6**	3	0
(Belgium) **L Courtois**	**6**	3	**6**
7	(United States) Z Garrison-Jackson	1	**6**	4

Quarterfinals
3	(Bulgaria) **M Maleeva**	**6**	**6**
(Belgium) L Courtois	2	2

=== Bottom half ===
==== Section 3 ====
First round
WC	(Netherlands) M Bollegraf	**6**	6	3
LL	(Czech Republic) **K Kroupová**	4	**6**	**7**
(United States) D Graham	**6**	6	0/r
Q	(Spain) **S Ramón-Cortés**	4	**7**	**1**
(Czech Republic) P Langrová	4	1
13	(Netherlands) **M Oremans**	**6**	**6**
16	(Israel) A Smashnova	6	1
(Germany) **M Babel**	**7**	**6**
(Argentina) P Tarabini	2	4
(Russia) **E Makarova**	**6**	**6**
(Poland) **K Nowak**	**6**	**6**
(Germany) S Meier	4	3

Second round
8	(Germany) **S Hack**	5	**6**	**6**
LL	(Czech Republic) K Kroupová	**7**	1	0
Q	(Spain) **S Ramón-Cortés**	**6**	**6**
13	(Netherlands) M Oremans	3	4
(Germany) **M Babel**	**6**	**6**
(Russia) E Makarova	4	1
(Poland) **K Nowak**	**7**	**6**
4	(Austria) J Wiesner	6	4

Third round
8	(Germany) **S Hack**	**6**	**7**
Q	(Spain) S Ramón-Cortés	1	5
(Germany) M Babel	2	3
(Poland) **K Nowak**	**6**	**6**

Quarterfinals
8	(Germany) **S Hack**	**6**	**7**
(Poland) K Nowak	1	6

==== Section 4 ====
First round
WC	(Canada) R Simpson	**7**	6	3
(United States) **T Whitlinger-Jones**	5	**7**	**6**
(Sweden) M Strandlund	1	4
(Germany) **W Probst**	**6**	**6**
(Italy) **S Farina**	**6**	**6**
11	(Belgium) S Appelmans	1	2
10	(Italy) **S Cecchini**	**6**	**6**
(Austria) P Schwarz	2	3
(Argentina) **B Fulco-Villella**	**6**	**6**
(United States) S Stafford	3	2
Q	(United States) A Miller	2	0
Q	(Argentina) **M-J Gaidano**	**6**	**6**

Second round
6	(Argentina) **I Gorrochategui**	**6**	0	**6**
(United States) T Whitlinger-Jones	3	**6**	3
(Germany) **W Probst**	**7**	2	**7**
(Italy) S Farina	6	**6**	6
10	(Italy) S Cecchini	1	4
(Argentina) **B Fulco-Villella**	**6**	**6**
Q	(Argentina) M-J Gaidano	0	0
2	(Argentina) **G Sabatini**	**6**	**6**

Third round
6	(Argentina) **I Gorrochategui**	**6**	**7**
(Germany) W Probst	2	5
(Argentina) B Fulco-Villella	1	0
2	(Argentina) **G Sabatini**	**6**	**6**

Quarterfinals
6	(Argentina) I Gorrochategui	0	3
2	(Argentina) **G Sabatini**	**6**	**6**
