= Angela Lettiere =

American tennis player

- Full name: Angela Lettiere Simon
- Country (sports): United States
- Born: April 4, 1972 (age 54) Fort Lauderdale, Florida, U.S.
- College: Georgia (1991–94)
- Prize money: $76,016

Singles
- Highest ranking: No. 220 (February 20, 1995)

Grand Slam singles results
- Australian Open: 1R (1994)

Doubles
- Highest ranking: No. 40 (December 23, 1996)

Grand Slam doubles results
- Australian Open: 1R (1997)
- French Open: 1R (1996)
- Wimbledon: 1R (1996)
- US Open: 3R (1996)
Medal record
Summer Universiade
Bronze medal – third place	1991 Sheffield	Women's doubles

Angela Lettiere Simon (born April 4, 1972) is a former professional tennis player from the United States.

== Biography ==
Lettiere was raised in Vero Beach, Florida, before moving to Sunrise, Florida in 1990 to train at the local tennis academy. She finished her schooling at St. Thomas Aquinas High School.

== College ==
She went on to attend the University of Georgia. In 1994 she was a member of Georgia's NCAA championship winning team and claimed the NCAA singles championship, beating UCLA's Keri Phebus in the final. While at Georgia, she won the Honda Sports Award as the nation's best female tennis player in 1994.

== Professional ==
On her WTA Tour main draw debut in 1994, Lettiere upset world number 32 Katerina Maleeva at Stratton Mountain. She received a wildcard to compete in the 1994 US Open, where she fell in the first round to Argentine qualifier María José Gaidano.

It was as a doubles player that Lettiere had the most impact on the WTA Tour, reaching a best ranking of 40 in the world. In 1996 she teamed up with Nana Miyagi to a runner-up finish in Chicago's Ameritech Cup, which included a quarter-final win over second seeds Lindsay Davenport and Mary Joe Fernandez.

== WTA Tour finals ==
=== Doubles (0-1) ===
Result	Date	Tournament	Tier	Surface	Partner	Opponents	Score
Runner-up	3 November 1996	Ameritech Cup, Chicago	Tier II	Carpet	(Japan) Nana Miyagi	(United States) Lisa Raymond (Australia) Rennae Stubbs	1–6, 1–6

== ITF finals ==
$50,000 tournaments
$25,000 tournaments
$10,000 tournaments

=== Doubles: 10 (6–4) ===
Outcome	No.	Date	Tournament	Surface	Partner	Opponents	Score
Winner	1.	June 20, 1994	Hilton Head, United States	Clay	(United States) Stacy Sheppard	(Puerto Rico) Kristina Brandi (United States) Karin Miller	4–6, 6–2, 7–6
Runner-up	1.	July 4, 1994	Indianapolis, United States	Hard	(Russia) Vera Vitels	(Puerto Rico) Kristina Brandi (United States) Karin Miller	2–6, 6–4, 6–7
Runner-up	2.	August 14, 1995	Fayetteville, United States	Hard	(United States) Karin Miller	(United States) Elly Hakami (United States) Stephanie Reece	0–6, 5–7
Winner	2.	December 4, 1995	Cergy, France	Hard	(United States) Corina Morariu	(Madagascar) Dally Randriantefy (Madagascar) Natacha Randriantefy	6–3, 7–5
Winner	3.	January 27, 1996	Mission, United States	Hard	(United States) Corina Morariu	(United States) Shannan McCarthy (United States) Julie Steven	7–6^{(9–7)}, 6–2
Winner	4.	February 17, 1996	Midland, United States	Hard	(United States) Corina Morariu	(United States) Katrina Adams (United States) Debbie Graham	7–6^{(7–4)}, 7–6^{(8–6)}
Runner-up	3.	May 19, 1996	Athens, Greece	Clay	(United States) Corina Morariu	(South Africa) Liezel Horn (Greece) Christína Papadáki	5–7, 2–6
Runner-up	4.	October 7, 1996	Sedona, United States	Hard	(United States) Shannan McCarthy	(United States) Katrina Adams (United States) Debbie Graham	4–6, 1–6
Winner	5.	December 8, 1996	Cergy, France	Hard	(United States) Meilen Tu	(Germany) Kirstin Freye (France) Noëlle van Lottum	6–4, 2–6, 6–4
Winner	6.	February 10, 1997	Midland, United States	Hard	(Japan) Nana Smith	(United States) Lindsay Lee-Waters (Chinese Taipei) Janet Lee	6–3, 6–2
