= Amelia Island Championships =

Coordinates: 30°11′37″N 81°22′18″W

Tournament information
- Founded: 1980
- Abolished: 2010
- Editions: 31
- Location: Amelia Island and Ponte Vedra Beach, Florida; United States
- Venue: Amelia Island Plantation and Sawgrass Country Club
- Category: International
- Surface: Green Clay / outdoors
- Draw: 32M / 32Q / 16D
- Prize money: $220,000

The Amelia Island Championships was a women's tennis tournament held in Amelia Island Plantation and later Ponte Vedra Beach, Florida, United States. The Women's Tennis Association event was an International series tournament played on outdoor green clay courts from 1980 to 2010.

== History ==
Formerly the Bausch & Lomb Championships, the tournament lost its title sponsor when Bausch & Lomb did not renew its contract following the 2008 event at Amelia Island Plantation on Amelia Island, Florida. Tournament organizers Octagon hired Axia Public Relations, a public relations firm, to find a new title sponsor. In August 2008, Axia and Octagon announced Fortune 1000 global staffing firm MPS Group (NYSE:MPS) of Jacksonville, Florida as the official tournament title sponsor. Octagon moved the annual event to Sawgrass Country Club in Ponte Vedra Beach as part of the tournament changes to attract more attendees and enjoy upgraded facilities.

On May 21, 2010, The WTA announced that the event would not be held in 2011. The WTA wanted to reduce the number of spring clay court events and the tournament offered the smallest prize money. The WTA offered replacement dates in February and July, but no facility was available in February, and temperatures in July can be unbearable.

One of the most unusual matches in the tournament's history occurred in the first round of the 2002 event. Anne Kremer defeated Jennifer Hopkins 5-7, 6-4, 6-2, with both players serving a combined 29 double faults. An investigation discovered that the court markings had been incorrectly measured, resulting in a smaller service box than normal.

== Sponsors ==
- 1980–1983: Murjani WTA Championships
- 1984: Lipton WTA Champions
- 1984: NutraSweet WTA Championships
- 1985–1986: Sunkist WITA Championships
- 1987–2008 : Bausch & Lomb Championships
- 2009–2010 : The MPS Group Championships

== Past finals ==
=== Singles ===
Location	Year	Champions	Runners-up	Score
Amelia Island	1980	(Czechoslovakia) Martina Navratilova	(Czechoslovakia) Hana Mandlíková	5–7, 6–3, 6–2
Amelia Island	1981	(United States) Chris Evert	(Czechoslovakia) Martina Navratilova	6–0, 6–0
Amelia Island	1982	(United States) Chris Evert (2)	(United States) Andrea Jaeger	6–3, 6–1
Amelia Island	1983	(United States) Chris Evert (3)	(Canada) Carling Bassett	6–3, 2–6, 7–5
Amelia Island	1984	(United States) Martina Navratilova (2)	(United States) Chris Evert	6–2, 6–0
Amelia Island	1985	(United States) Zina Garrison	(United States) Chris Evert	6–4, 6–3
Amelia Island	1986	(West Germany) Steffi Graf	(West Germany) Claudia Kohde-Kilsch	6–4, 5–7, 7–6^{(7–3)}
Amelia Island	1987	(West Germany) Steffi Graf (2)	(Czechoslovakia) Hana Mandlíková	6–3, 6–4
Amelia Island	1988	(United States) Martina Navratilova (3)	(Argentina) Gabriela Sabatini	6–0, 6–2
Amelia Island	1989	(Argentina) Gabriela Sabatini	(West Germany) Steffi Graf	3–6, 6–3, 7–5
Amelia Island	1990	(West Germany) Steffi Graf (3)	(Spain) Arantxa Sánchez Vicario	6–1, 6–0
Amelia Island	1991	(Argentina) Gabriela Sabatini (2)	(Germany) Steffi Graf	7–5, 7–6
Amelia Island	1992	(Argentina) Gabriela Sabatini (3)	(Germany) Steffi Graf	6–2, 1–6, 6–3
Amelia Island	1993	(Spain) Arantxa Sánchez Vicario	(Argentina) Gabriela Sabatini	6–2, 5–7, 6–2
Amelia Island	1994	(Spain) Arantxa Sánchez Vicario (2)	(Argentina) Gabriela Sabatini	6–1, 6–4
Amelia Island	1995	(Spain) Conchita Martínez	(Argentina) Gabriela Sabatini	6–1, 6–4
Amelia Island	1996	(Romania) Irina Spîrlea	(France) Mary Pierce	6–7, 6–4, 6–3
Amelia Island	1997	(United States) Lindsay Davenport	(France) Mary Pierce	6–2, 6–3
Amelia Island	1998	(France) Mary Pierce	(Spain) Conchita Martínez	6–7^{(8–10)}, 6–0, 6–2
Amelia Island	1999	(United States) Monica Seles	(Romania) Ruxandra Dragomir	6–2, 6–3
Amelia Island	2000	(United States) Monica Seles (2)	(Spain) Conchita Martínez	6–3, 6–2
Amelia Island	2001	(France) Amélie Mauresmo	(South Africa) Amanda Coetzer	6–4, 7–5
Amelia Island	2002	(United States) Venus Williams	(Belgium) Justine Henin	2–6, 7–5, 7–6^{(7–5)}
Amelia Island	2003	(Russia) Elena Dementieva	(United States) Lindsay Davenport	4–6, 7–5, 6–3
Amelia Island	2004	(United States) Lindsay Davenport (2)	(France) Amélie Mauresmo	6–4, 6–4
Amelia Island	2005	(United States) Lindsay Davenport (3)	(Italy) Silvia Farina Elia	7–5, 7–5
Amelia Island	2006	(Russia) Nadia Petrova	(Italy) Francesca Schiavone	6–4, 6–4
Amelia Island	2007	(France) Tatiana Golovin	(Russia) Nadia Petrova	6–2, 6–1
Amelia Island	2008	(Russia) Maria Sharapova	(Slovakia) Dominika Cibulková	7–6^{(9–7)}, 6–3
Ponte Vedra Beach	2009	(Denmark) Caroline Wozniacki	(Canada) Aleksandra Wozniak	6–1, 6–2
Ponte Vedra Beach	2010	(Denmark) Caroline Wozniacki (2)	(Belarus) Olga Govortsova	6–2, 7–5

=== Doubles ===
Location	Year	Champions	Runners-up	Score
Amelia Island	1980	(United States) Rosemary Casals (South Africa) Ilana Kloss	(United States) Kathy Jordan (United States) Pam Shriver	7–6, 7–6
Amelia Island	1981	(United States) Kathy Jordan (United States) Anne Smith	(United States) Joanne Russell (United States) Pam Shriver	6–3, 5–7, 7–6
Amelia Island	1982	(United States) Leslie Allen (Socialist Federal Republic of Yugoslavia) Mima Jaušovec	(United States) Barbara Potter (United States) Sharon Walsh	6–1, 7–5
Amelia Island	1983	(United States) Candy Reynolds (South Africa) Rosalyn Fairbank	(Romania) Virginia Ruzici (Czechoslovakia) Hana Mandlíková	6–4, 6–2
Amelia Island	1984	(United States) Kathy Jordan (2) (United States) Anne Smith (2)	(United Kingdom) Anne Hobbs (Socialist Federal Republic of Yugoslavia) Mima Jaušovec	6–4, 4–6, 6–4
Amelia Island	1985	(South Africa) Rosalyn Fairbank (2) (Czechoslovakia) Hana Mandlíková	(Canada) Carling Bassett (United States) Chris Evert	6–1, 2–6, 6–2
Amelia Island	1986	(West Germany) Claudia Kohde-Kilsch (Czechoslovakia) Helena Suková	(Argentina) Gabriela Sabatini (France) Catherine Tanvier	6–2, 5–7, 7–6
Amelia Island	1987	(West Germany) Steffi Graf (Argentina) Gabriela Sabatini	(Czechoslovakia) Hana Mandlíková (Australia) Wendy Turnbull	3–6, 6–3, 7–5
Amelia Island	1988	(United States) Zina Garrison Jackson (West Germany) Eva Pfaff	(United States) Katrina Adams (United States) Penny Barg-Mager	4–6, 6–2, 7–6
Amelia Island	1989	(Soviet Union) Larisa Savchenko (Soviet Union) Natasha Zvereva	(United States) Martina Navratilova (United States) Pam Shriver	7–6, 2–6, 6–1
Amelia Island	1990	(Argentina) Mercedes Paz (Spain) Arantxa Sánchez Vicario	(Czechoslovakia) Regina Rajchrtová (Hungary) Andrea Temesvári	7–6, 6–4
Amelia Island	1991	(Spain) Arantxa Sánchez Vicario (2) (Czechoslovakia) Helena Suková (2)	(Argentina) Mercedes Paz (Soviet Union) Natasha Zvereva	4–6, 6–2, 6–2
Amelia Island	1992	(Spain) Arantxa Sánchez Vicario (3) (Belarus) Natasha Zvereva (2)	(United States) Zina Garrison-Jackson (Czechoslovakia) Jana Novotná	6–1, 6–0
Amelia Island	1993	(Switzerland) Manuela Maleeva-Fragnière (Georgia (country)) Leila Meskhi	(South Africa) Amanda Coetzer (Argentina) Inés Gorrochategui	3–6, 6–3, 6–4
Amelia Island	1994	(Latvia) Larisa Neiland (Spain) Arantxa Sánchez Vicario (4)	(South Africa) Amanda Coetzer (Argentina) Inés Gorrochategui	6–2, 6–7, 6–4
Amelia Island	1995	(South Africa) Amanda Coetzer (Argentina) Inés Gorrochategui	(United States) Nicole Arendt (Netherlands) Manon Bollegraf	6–2, 3–6, 6–2
Amelia Island	1996	(United States) Chanda Rubin (Spain) Arantxa Sánchez Vicario (5)	(United States) Meredith McGrath (Latvia) Larisa Neiland	6–1, 6–1
Amelia Island	1997	(United States) Lindsay Davenport (Czech Republic) Jana Novotná	(United States) Nicole Arendt (Netherlands) Manon Bollegraf	6–3, 6–0
Amelia Island	1998	(United States) Sandra Cacic (France) Mary Pierce	(Austria) Barbara Schett (Switzerland) Patty Schnyder	7–6, 4–6, 7–6
Amelia Island	1999	(Spain) Conchita Martínez (Argentina) Patricia Tarabini	(United States) Lisa Raymond (Australia) Rennae Stubbs	7–5, 0–6, 6–4
Amelia Island	2000	Rain prevented play		
Amelia Island	2001	(Spain) Conchita Martínez (2) (Argentina) Patricia Tarabini (2)	(United States) Martina Navratilova (Spain) Arantxa Sánchez Vicario	6–4, 6–2
Amelia Island	2002	(Slovakia) Daniela Hantuchová (Spain) Arantxa Sánchez Vicario (6)	(Argentina) María Emilia Salerni (Sweden) Åsa Svensson	6–4, 6–2
Amelia Island	2003	(United States) Lindsay Davenport (2) (United States) Lisa Raymond	(Spain) Virginia Ruano Pascual (Argentina) Paola Suárez	7–5, 6–2
Amelia Island	2004	(Russia) Nadia Petrova (United States) Meghann Shaughnessy	(Switzerland) Myriam Casanova (Australia) Alicia Molik	3–6, 6–2, 7–5
Amelia Island	2005	(Australia) Bryanne Stewart (Australia) Samantha Stosur	(Czech Republic) Květa Peschke (Switzerland) Patty Schnyder	6–4, 6–2
Amelia Island	2006	(Japan) Shinobu Asagoe (Slovenia) Katarina Srebotnik	(South Africa) Liezel Huber (India) Sania Mirza	6–2, 6–4
Amelia Island	2007	(Italy) Mara Santangelo (Slovenia) Katarina Srebotnik (2)	(Spain) Anabel Medina Garrigues (Spain) Virginia Ruano Pascual	6–3, 7–6^{(7–4)}
Amelia Island	2008	(United States) Bethanie Mattek (Czech Republic) Vladimíra Uhlířová	(Belarus) Victoria Azarenka (Russia) Elena Vesnina	6–3, 6–1
Ponte Vedra Beach	2009	(Chinese Taipei) Chuang Chia-jung (India) Sania Mirza	(Czech Republic) Květa Peschke (United States) Lisa Raymond	6–3, 4–6, [10–7]
Ponte Vedra Beach	2010	(United States) Bethanie Mattek-Sands (2) (China) Yan Zi	(Chinese Taipei) Chuang Chia-jung (China) Peng Shuai	4–6, 6–4, [10–8]

== See also ==
- List of tennis tournaments
