= Tatjana Ječmenica =

Serbian tennis player and coach (1978–2026)

Tatjana Ječmenica Татјана Јечменица
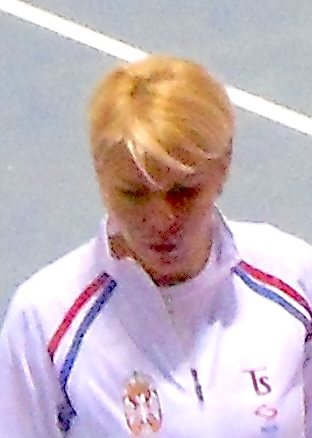
- Ječmenica in 2016
- Country (sports): FR Yugoslavia (1993–2003); Serbia and Montenegro (2003–2005)
- Residence: Novi Sad, Vojvodina, Serbia
- Born: 4 July 1978 Novi Sad, SAP Vojvodina, SR Serbia, SFR Yugoslavia
- Died: 13 February 2026 (aged 47) Belgrade, Serbia
- Height: 1.79 m (5 ft 10 1/2 in)
- Turned pro: 24 March 1993
- Retired: 2005 (last singles match played in July 1998)
- Plays: Right-handed (two-handed backhand)
- Prize money: $163,876

Singles
- Career record: 106–62
- Career titles: 6 ITF
- Highest ranking: No. 72 (24 June 1996)

Grand Slam singles results
- Australian Open: 1R (1996, 1997)
- French Open: 2R (1996)
- Wimbledon: 1R (1996)
- US Open: 2R (1995)

Doubles
- Career record: 36–33
- Career titles: 3 ITF
- Highest ranking: No. 88 (29 July 1996)

Grand Slam doubles results
- Australian Open: 1R (1997)
- French Open: 1R (1996)
- Wimbledon: 1R (1996)
- US Open: 2R (1996)

Tatjana Ječmenica-Jevtić (Serbian Cyrillic: Татјана Јечменица-Јевтић; 4 July 1978 – 13 February 2026) was a Serbian professional tennis player. From 2014 until her death, she was captain of Serbia Fed Cup team. This was her second stint at the helm; she had previously led the team between 2005 and 2007.

Ječmenica won six singles and three doubles titles on the ITF Circuit in her career. On 24 June 1996, she reached her best singles ranking at world No. 72. On 29 July 1996, she peaked at No. 88 in doubles rankings. Her sister, Aleksandra also played professional tennis.

In Grand Slams her best result was reaching the second round at the US Open in 1995 and at the French Open in 1996.

== Career ==
Ječmenica started playing tennis in her hometown of Novi Sad at the age of seven and attended the same school and played in the same tennis club as Monica Seles.

=== Juniors ===
In 1993, as a second seed Ječmenica reached the final of the Orange Bowl 16s, where she was defeated by fifth seed Stephanie Halsell, who avenged the previous year's loss to Ječmenica in the quarterfinals of the Junior Orange Bowl 14s (Ječmenica was eventually stopped in the semifinals of that tournament). She won the Port Washington 14s. In 1994, she lost in the first round of the Junior French Open, but won the German Junior Open, a Grade 1 event, without losing a set in the tournament.

Junior Grand Slam results - Singles:

Australian Open: –
French Open: 1R (1994)
Wimbledon: –
US Open: –

Junior Grand Slam results - Doubles:

Australian Open: –
French Open: 2R (1994)
Wimbledon: –
US Open: –

=== Professional ===
As a touted youth prospect she enrolled at the Nick Bollettieri Tennis Academy.

After her longtime coach, Dragan Ćirić Šeki, who had coached her since she was nine, died in a car accident on 10 October 1997, Ječmenica didn't play for five months after being unable to find a new coach. She also briefly trained at the Nikola Pilić Tennis Academy before retiring in 1998 at the age of 20.

In 2001, she played her first doubles tournament in over three years and over the next several years would play two more doubles tournaments, reaching one final in 2004, before retiring for good in 2005.

=== Coaching ===
Following her playing career, Ječmenica became a tennis coach and in 2004 founded tennis school "Ječmenica" in her hometown of Novi Sad for children aged 5 to 20, with some being ranked in the top 10 in the country.

She served as the captain of Serbia Fed Cup team from 2005 until her resignation on 20 February 2007.

On 5 November 2014, Ječmenica was named the captain of Serbia's Fed Cup team for the second time.

== Death ==
Ječmenica died in a traffic collision on 13 February 2026, at the age of 47. She is survived by her husband, Darko Jevtić – who was in the same vehicle and remains in critical condition as of 14 February 2026 – and her son, Aleksa. Novak Djokovic shared his condolences on her death via Instagram story.

== ITF Circuit finals ==
=== Singles: 9 (6 titles, 3 runner-ups) ===
Legend $100,000 tournaments $75,000 tournaments $50,000 tournaments $25,000 tournaments $10,000 tournaments	Finals by surface Hard (1–0) Clay (5–2) Grass (0–0) Carpet (0–1)

Result	No.	Date	Tier	Tournament	Surface	Opponent	Score
Loss	1.	4 April 1993	10,000	ITF Marsa, Malta	Clay	(Italy) Stefania Indemini	2–6, 6–2, 2–6
Loss	2.	13 June 1993	10,000	ITF Murska, Slovenia	Clay	(Hungary) Rita Kuti-Kis	2–6, 3–6
Win	1.	12 September 1993	10,000	ITF Varna, Bulgaria	Clay	(Bulgaria) Antoaneta Pandjerova	6–2, 3–6, 6–2
Win	2.	30 January 1994	10,000	ITF Austin, United States	Hard	(Russia) Tatiana Panova	6–4, 6–7^{(9–11)}, 7–6^{(8–6)}
Win	3.	19 June 1994	10,000	ITF Maribor, Slovenia	Clay	(Czech Republic) Zdeňka Málková	6–1, 6–7^{(6–8)}, 6–3
Win	4.	3 July 1994	25,000	ITF Vaihingen, Germany	Clay	(Moldova) Svetlana Komleva	6–3, 7–6^{(7–5)}
Loss	3.	20 November 1994	25,000	ITF Bad Gögging, Germany	Carpet (i)	(Germany) Silke Meier	6–4, 4–6, 3–6
Win	5.	11 June 1995	25,000	ITF Novi Sad, FR Yugoslavia	Clay	(Germany) Andrea Glass	7–6^{(6–4)}, 6–1
Win	6.	6 August 1995	25,000	ITF Budapest, Hungary	Clay	(Slovenia) Barbara Mulej	6–3, 6–2

=== Doubles: 7 (3 titles, 4 runner-ups) ===
Legend $100,000 tournaments $75,000 tournaments $50,000 tournaments $25,000 tournaments $10,000 tournaments	Finals by surface Hard (0–1) Clay (2–3) Grass (0–0) Carpet (1–0)

Result	No.	Date	Tier	Tournament	Surface	Partner	Opponents	Score
Loss	1.	30 October 1994	25,000	ITF Poitiers, France	Hard	(Bulgaria) Svetlana Krivencheva	(Czech Republic) Ludmila Richterová (Czech Republic) Helena Vildová	6–7, 1–6
Win	1.	20 November 1994	25,000	ITF Bad Gögging, Germany	Carpet (i)	(Romania) Cătălina Cristea	(Czech Republic) Kateřina Kroupová (Czech Republic) Jana Pospíšilová	3–6, 6–3, 6–2
Loss	2.	10 June 1995	25,000	ITF Novi Sad, FR Yugoslavia	Clay	(Bulgaria) Antoaneta Pandjerova	(Argentina) Laura Montalvo (Paraguay) Larissa Schaerer	7–5, 1–6, 1–6
Loss	3.	9 July 1995	25,000	ITF Vaihingen, Germany	Clay	(Ukraine) Elena Tatarkova	(Slovakia) Henrieta Nagyová (Slovakia) Radka Zrubáková	3–6, 6–7
Win	2.	6 August 1995	25,000	ITF Budapest, Hungary	Clay	(Bulgaria) Svetlana Krivencheva	(Poland) Magdalena Feistel (Czech Republic) Helena Vildová	6–4, 6–3
Win	3.	17 May 1998	10,000	ITF Novi Sad, FR Yugoslavia	Clay	(Federal Republic of Yugoslavia) Dragana Zarić	(Bulgaria) Antoaneta Pandjerova (Bulgaria) Desislava Topalova	6–2, 7–5
Loss	4.	24 July 2004	10,000	ITF Palić, Serbia and Montenegro	Clay	(France) Ana-Maria Zubori	(Serbia and Montenegro) Karolina Jovanović (Serbia and Montenegro) Nataša Zorić	1–6, 4–6
