= Åsa Svensson =

Swedish tennis player (born 1975)

- Country (sports): Sweden
- Residence: Västerås, Sweden
- Born: 16 June 1975 (age 51) Surahammar, Sweden
- Height: 1.78 m (5 ft 10 in)
- Turned pro: 1992
- Retired: 2004
- Plays: Right-handed (two-handed backhand)
- Prize money: US$ 1,569,134

Singles
- Career record: 322–287
- Career titles: 2 WTA, 3 ITF
- Highest ranking: No. 28 (1 April 1996)

Grand Slam singles results
- Australian Open: 3R (1997, 2000, 2002)
- French Open: 4R (2000)
- Wimbledon: 2R (1998)
- US Open: 4R (1996)

Doubles
- Career record: 206–222
- Career titles: 7 WTA, 6 ITF
- Highest ranking: No. 28 (9 October 2000)

Grand Slam doubles results
- Australian Open: 3R (1999, 2001)
- French Open: 2R (1995, 1996, 2001, 2002)
- Wimbledon: 2R (1994, 1995, 1996, 2000, 2002)
- US Open: 3R (2002)

Grand Slam mixed doubles results
- Australian Open: 2R (1997)
- Wimbledon: QF (2002)
- US Open: QF (2004)

Team competitions
- Hopman Cup: F (1999)

Åsa Svensson (born Carlsson; 16 June 1975) is a former tennis player from Sweden, who turned professional in 1992. She won two singles and seven doubles titles in her career. The right-hander reached her highest individual ranking on the WTA Tour on 1 April 1996, when she became the No. 28 of the world.

== Biography ==
Svensson trained at the Royal Lawn Tennis Club in Stockholm. She married Niclas Svensson on 8 December 2001 and travelled with him on the tour. Her maiden name is Carlsson, her father's name is Lennart, mother's name is Signe.

In January 2005, she announced she gave up tennis.

== WTA career finals ==
=== Singles: 4 (2 titles, 2 runner-ups) ===
Legend
Grand Slam tournaments
Tier I (0–0)
Tier II (0–1)
Tier III (2–1)
Tier IV & V (0–0)

Result	W/L	Date	Tournament	Surface	Opponent	Score
Loss	0–1	May 1994	Prague Open, Czech Republic	Clay	(South Africa) Amanda Coetzer	1–6, 6–7^{(14–16)}
Loss	0–2	Apr 1995	VS Houston, United States	Clay	(Germany) Steffi Graf	1–6, 1–6
Win	1–2	Nov 1999	Malaysia Open	Hard	(United States) Erika deLone	6–2, 6–4
Win	2–2	Apr 2002	Bol Open, Croatia	Clay	(Croatia) Iva Majoli	6–3, 4–6, 6–1

=== Doubles: 16 (7 titles, 9 runner-ups) ===
Legend
Grand Slam tournaments
Tier I (0–0)
Tier II (1–3)
Tier III (3–3)
Tier IV & V (3–3)

Result	W/L	Date	Tournament	Surface	Partner	Opponents	Score
Loss	0–1	Feb 1994	Linz Open, Austria	Carpet (i)	(Germany) Caroline Schneider	(Russia) Eugenia Maniokova (Georgia (country)) Leila Meskhi	2–6, 2–6
Loss	0–2	Jul 1998	Warsaw Open, Poland	Clay	(Netherlands) Seda Noorlander	(Czech Republic) Kveta Peschke (Czech Republic) Helena Vildová	2–6, 4–6
Loss	0–3	Aug 1998	Istanbul Open, Turkey	Hard	(Argentina) Florencia Labat	(Germany) Meike Babel (Belgium) Laurence Courtois	0–6, 2–6
Loss	0–4	Jul 1999	Palermo Open, Italy	Clay	(Canada) Sonya Jeyaseelan	(Slovenia) Tina Križan (Slovenia) Katarina Srebotnik	6–4, 3–6, 0–6
Win	1–4	Nov 1999	Pattaya Open, Thailand	Hard	(France) Émilie Loit	(Russia) Evgenia Koulikovskaya (Austria) Patricia Wartusch	6–1, 6–4
Loss	1–5	Feb 2000	Paris Indoor, France	Carpet (i)	(France) Émilie Loit	(France) Julie Halard-Decugis (France) Sandrine Testud	6–3, 3–6, 4–6
Win	2–5	Feb 2000	Hanover Grand Prix, Germany	Hard (i)	(Belarus) Natasha Zvereva	(Italy) Silvia Farina Elia (Slovakia) Karina Habšudová	6–3, 6–4
Loss	2–6	Jul 2000	Warsaw Open, Poland	Clay	(Italy) Rita Grande	(Spain) Virginia Ruano Pascual (Argentina) Paola Suárez	5–7, 1–6
Loss	2–7	Feb 2001	Dubai Championships, United Arab Emirates	Hard	(Slovakia) Karina Habšudová	(Indonesia) Yayuk Basuki (Netherlands) Caroline Vis	0–6, 6–4, 2–6
Win	3–7	Jul 2001	Morocco Open	Clay	(Bulgaria) Lubomira Bacheva	(Spain) María José Martínez Sánchez (Argentina) María Emilia Salerni	6–3, 6–7^{(4–7)}, 6–1
Win	4–7	Nov 2001	Pattaya Open, Thailand	Hard	(Uzbekistan) Iroda Tulyaganova	(South Africa) Liezel Huber (Indonesia) Wynne Prakusya	4–6, 6–3, 6–3
Loss	4–8	Dec 2001	Gold Coast, Australia	Hard	(Netherlands) Miriam Oremans	(United States) Meghann Shaughnessy (Belgium) Justine Henin	1–6, 6–7^{(6–8)}
Loss	4–9	Apr 2002	Amelia Island Championships, United States	Clay	(Argentina) María Emilia Salerni	(Spain) Arantxa Sánchez Vicario (Slovakia) Daniela Hantuchová	4–6, 2–6
Win	5–9	Feb 2003	Copa Colsanitas, Colombia	Clay	(Slovenia) Katarina Srebotnik	(Slovenia) Tina Križan (Ukraine) Tatiana Perebiynis	6–2, 6–1
Win	6–9	Mar 2003	Mexican Open	Clay	(France) Émilie Loit	(Hungary) Petra Mandula (Austria) Patricia Wartusch	6–3, 6–1
Win	7–9	Feb 2004	National Indoor, United States	Carpet	(United States) Meilen Tu	(Russia) Maria Sharapova (Russia) Vera Zvonareva	6–4, 7–6^{(7–0)}

== ITF finals ==
$100,000 tournaments
$75,000 tournaments
$50,000 tournaments
$25,000 tournaments
$10,000 tournaments

=== Singles: 8 (3–5) ===
Result	No.	Date	Tournament	Surface	Opponent	Score
Win	1.	4 November 1991	ITF Ljusdal, Sweden	Carpet (i)	(Germany) Michaela Seibold	6–3, 6–2
Win	2.	13 January 1992	ITF Helsinki, Finland	Carpet (i)	(Denmark) Sofie Albinus	6–3, 6–3
Loss	3.	29 June 1992	ITF Ronneby, Sweden	Clay	(Austria) Marion Maruska	6–4, 1–6, 2–6
Loss	4.	31 August 1992	ITF Klagenfurt, Austria	Clay	(Romania) Ruxandra Dragomir	4–6, 3–6
Win	5.	30 October 1995	ITF Stockholm, Sweden	Hard (i)	(Sweden) Anna-Karin Svensson	6–1, 6–2
Loss	6.	23 September 1996	ITF Limoges, France	Hard (i)	(Belgium) Dominique Monami	6–2, 6–7^{(4)}, 1–6
Loss	7.	8 April 2001	ITF Boynton Beach, United States	Clay	(Slovakia) Henrieta Nagyová	6–3, 3–6, 1–6
Loss	8.	11 July 2004	ITF Darmstadt, Germany	Clay	(Romania) Magda Mihalache	1–6, 6–3, 5–7

=== Doubles: 8 (6–2) ===
Result	No.	Date	Tournament	Surface	Partner	Opponents	Score
Loss	1.	22 October 1990	ITF Neumünster, Germany	Clay	(Sweden) Marie Linusson	(Germany) Anke Marchl (Netherlands) Christina Singer-Bath	2–6, 5–7
Win	2.	13 January 1992	ITF Helsinki, Finland	Carpet (i)	(Sweden) Marielle Wallin	(Finland) Anne Aallonen (Finland) Marja-Liisa Kuurne	0–6, 7–5, 6–2
Loss	3.	28 June 1993	ITF Ronneby, Sweden	Clay	(Sweden) Marielle Wallin	(Sweden) Catarina Bernstein (Australia) Shannon Peters	6–2, 6–7^{(5)}, 6–7^{(5)}
Win	4.	7 March 1999	ITF Dubai, United Arab Emirates	Hard	(Belgium) Laurence Courtois	(Italy) Laura Golarsa (Kazakhstan) Irina Selyutina	6–3, 5–7, 6–0
Win	5.	19 September 1999	ITF Bordeaux, France	Clay	(France) Émilie Loit	(Bulgaria) Lubomira Bacheva (Spain) Cristina Torrens Valero	6–2, 7–6^{(1)}
Win	6.	11 October 1999	ITF Bordeaux, France	Hard (i)	(France) Émilie Loit	(France) Alexandra Fusai (Italy) Rita Grande	6–2, 7–6^{(5)}
Win	7.	28 October 2003	ITF Nottingham, United Kingdom	Hard (i)	(Sweden) Helena Ejeson	(Republic of Ireland) Yvonne Doyle (Republic of Ireland) Karen Nugent	6–3, 7–6^{(11)}
Win	8.	15 February 2004	ITF Midland, United States	Hard (i)	(Sweden) Sofia Arvidsson	(United States) Allison Baker (United States) Tara Snyder	7–6^{(5)}, 6–2

== Best Grand Slam results details ==
	Australian Open	
1997 Australian Open
Round	Opponent	Score
1R	(Czech Republic) Petra Langrová	6–3, 6–2
2R	(Canada) Patricia Hy-Boulais	2–6, 6–3, 6–0
3R	(Spain) Conchita Martínez (3)	0–6, 1–6
2000 Australian Open
Round	Opponent	Score
1R	(United States) Alexandra Stevenson	7–6^{(8–6)}, 6–3
2R	(Netherlands) Kristie Boogert	7–5, 6–3
3R	(Japan) Ai Sugiyama	4–6, 6–4, 3–6
2002 Australian Open
Round	Opponent	Score
1R	(Australia) Evie Dominikovic	6–3, 6–2
2R	(Spain) Conchita Martínez	6–4, 6–1
3R	(Slovakia) Martina Suchá	0–6, 4–6

	French Open	
2000 French Open
Round	Opponent	Score
1R	(United States) Amy Frazier	6–3, 4–6, 7–5
2R	(Croatia) Iva Majoli (WC)	7–6^{(8–6)}, 1–6, 6–1
3R	(France) Sandrine Testud (10)	4–6, 6–3, 7–5
4R	(France) Mary Pierce (6)	2–6, 1–6

	Wimbledon Championships	
1998 Wimbledon
Round	Opponent	Score
1R	(Czech Republic) Adriana Gerši	6–1, 6–1
2R	(Netherlands) Miriam Oremans	2–6, 3–6

	US Open	
1996 US Open
Round	Opponent	Score
1R	(Italy) Gloria Pizzichini	3–6, 6–1, 7–5
2R	(Austria) Barbara Schett	6–2, 3–1 ret.
3R	(Argentina) Gabriela Sabatini (15)	7–5, 3–6, 6–2
4R	(Spain) Conchita Martínez (4)	2–6, 1–6
