= Amelia Island Plantation =

Resort in Amelia Island, Florida

Coordinates: 30°33′22″N 81°26′59″W

Omni Amelia Island Resort
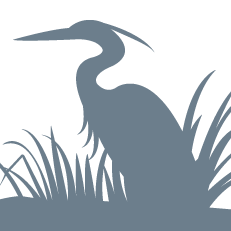
- Company type: Subsidiary
- Industry: Hospitality and Real estate development
- Founded: 1971
- Headquarters: Amelia Island, Florida
- Key people: Theo Schofield, Managing Director
- Number of employees: 825
- Parent: Omni Hotels & Resorts
- Website: www.omnihotels.com/hotels/amelia-island

Omni Amelia Island Resort is a luxury resort community located on Amelia Island, Florida, the westernmost barrier island on the Atlantic Ocean in the U.S. The resort's tennis facility hosted the Bausch & Lomb Championships, a major Women's Tennis Association tournament, for 20 years. The 402-room hotel on the property is now part of Omni Hotels & Resorts.

== Resort ==
The 1,350 acre community includes a 402-room resort, nine restaurants, 46 holes of championship golf, 7 pickleball courts and 23 Har-Tru clay tennis courts. The development has a total value of $1.95 billion when the 1,150 condominiums, 800 homes and unbuilt lots are counted.

== History ==
Development of Amelia Island Resort began in 1971 by the Hilton Head Island's Sea Pines Company. Under Fraser’s Vice President, landscape architect Arthur Foster, and his design staff, the master plan for Amelia Island was prepared. A variety of consultants advised Foster in the master planning of Amelia Island. The emphasis of Foster’s team was to balance the development with the natural environment. The master plan became part of the deed covenants that protected the tidal marshes, dunes, savannas and wildlife that existed there.

The original owners filed Chapter 11 bankruptcy in 1976. The resort was purchased in 1978 by a group of investors headed by Richard Cooper. The new owners took the name, Amelia Island Company (AIC), but the resort and company are synonymous. Over the next 30 years, the property was further developed and enhanced as a prestigious location. The hotel's name was changed from Amelia Island Plantation Hotel to Amelia Inn & Beach Club and then to its current Omni Amelia Island Resort once Omni Hotels & Resorts purchased the real estate in 2010.

It is a four-diamond AAA resort, which offers 80,000 sq ft (7,400 m^{2}) of flexible space to accommodate meetings and conventions of up to 1,600 participants. AIP was host of a woman's professional tennis tournament beginning in 1980 which became the Bausch & Lomb Championships from 1987 to 2008. Many other events are hosted by the resort each year including a wine festival, golf tournaments and a jazz festival. The facility features 20 swimming pools, a full-service spa, kids' club and stocked fishing lake, situated between 3½ miles of white sand beaches and the Intracoastal Waterway, convenient for those with boats. Although longtime company president Richard Cooper died in 2008, the Cooper family retained ownership.

=== Economic downturn ===
The Late-2000s recession affected real estate and resorts significantly and AIP “suffered a substantial negative cash flow”, forcing the company to cut wages and layoff 25% of their workforce.

In January, 2009, Atlanta developer Redquartz Development announced an agreement to become majority owner of Amelia Island Resort for $60 million, but by May, the deal was abandoned when Redquartz couldn't raise the cash. The company also contemplated the sale of the hotel and a couple of golf courses to Metropolitan Life Insurance Company, but a deal could not be reached.

The Amelia Island Company filed for Chapter 11 bankruptcy on November 13, 2009 to buy time with its creditors while it completed a reorganization plan. The Plasencia Group served as investment advisor to the debtor.

AIC filed a reorganization plan in May, 2010 in which the Noble Investment Group would acquire AIC and invest $45.9 million to pay off debts and provide the capital needed to emerge from bankruptcy. Under the acquisition agreement, the Cooper family interests would receive up to $5 million, and homeowners would be able to buy ownership of one of the resort golf courses and of the clubhouse they currently use exclusively. On August 23, 2010, TRT Holdings, parent company of Omni Hotels, emerged as the successful bidder with a $67.1 million bid in an auction conducted in federal bankruptcy court. The transaction closed in early September 2012.

== Golf ==
One of the biggest attractions at Omni Amelia Island Resort are the golf courses. The resort boasts two championship courses. The Oak Marsh course, was Pete Dye's design, and winds through salt marshes and heritage oaks draped with spanish moss. The challenging Long Point course, designed by Tom Fazio, includes eight water hazards that must be crossed.

=== Amelia River Golf Club ===
Starting in 2005, the Amelia Island Company leased the Royal Amelia Golf Course and it was renamed Amelia River Golf Club in 2007. The property was owned by the city of Fernandina Beach, and was created by Tom Jackson. When AIC filed for bankruptcy in 2009, the lease was terminated and possession was returned to the owner.

== Tennis ==
Tennis is another big attraction at the resort. Omni Amelia Island Resort is home to 23 Har-Tru clay courts shaded by tall southern live oak trees during the day and fully lit at night. The facility offers the Cliff Drysdale tennis instruction program and has been rated the 16th best tennis resort in the United States by Tennis Resorts Online and a Top 50 Tennis Resort by Tennis Magazine.

== Fitness ==
Omni Amelia Island Resort is also home to a high quality stand alone fitness center, including free and machine weight rooms; yoga and body tone classes, and aqua fit classes in the 20 yard heated indoor lap pool. There is also a smaller fitness center located in the Omni Amelia Island Resort building.
