= Gabriela Sabatini career statistics =

Career finals
Discipline	Type	Won	Lost	Total	WR
Singles	Grand Slam	1	2	3	0.33
Singles	Year-end	2	2	4	0.50
Singles	Tier I / Category 4-6	13	9	22	0.59
Singles	Tier II / Category 3	7	10	17	0.41
Singles	Tier III-V / Category 1-2	3	1	4	0.75
Singles	Uncategorized	1	3	4	0.25
Singles	Olympics	0	1	1	0.00
Singles	Total	27	28	55	0.49
Doubles	Grand Slam	1	3	4	0.25
Doubles	Year-end	–	–	–	–
Doubles	Tier I / Category 4-6	4	6	10	0.40
Doubles	Tier II / Category 3	2	3	5	0.40
Doubles	Tier III-V / Category 1-2	1	0	1	1.00
Doubles	Uncategorized	6	4	10	0.60
Doubles	Olympics	–	–	–	–
Doubles	Total	14	16	30	0.47

This is a list of the main career statistics of Argentine former female professional tennis player Gabriela Sabatini.

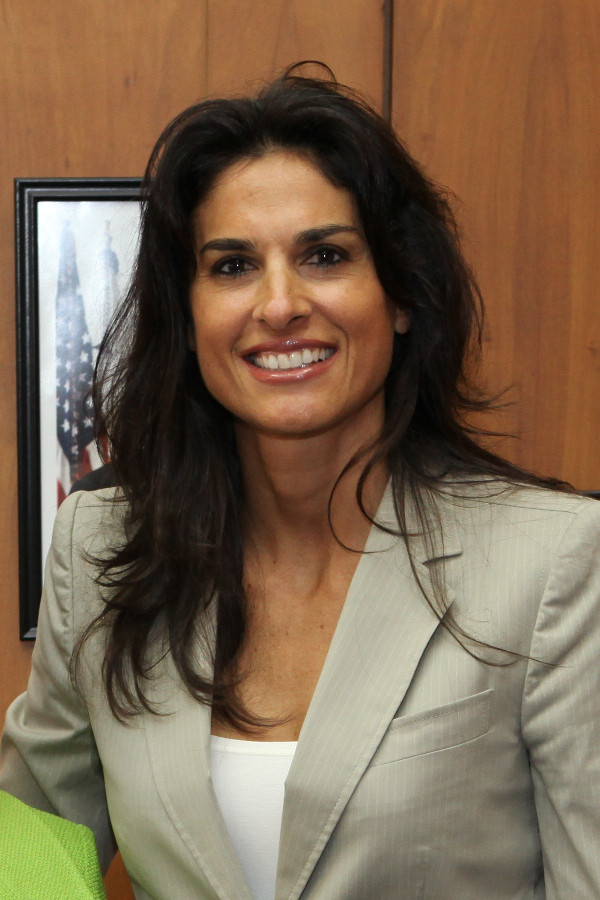
Sabatini at the USA Embassy in Buenos Aires

== Performance timelines ==
Key
W	F	SF	QF	#R	RR	Q#	P#	DNQ	A	Z#	PO	G	S	B	NMS	NTI	P	NH

(W) winner; (F) finalist; (SF) semifinalist; (QF) quarterfinalist; (#R) rounds 4, 3, 2, 1; (RR) round-robin stage; (Q#) qualification round; (P#) preliminary round; (DNQ) did not qualify; (A) absent; (Z#) Davis/Fed Cup Zonal Group (with number indication) or (PO) play-off; (G) gold, (S) silver or (B) bronze Olympic/Paralympic medal; (NMS) not a Masters tournament; (NTI) not a Tier I tournament; (P) postponed; (NH) not held; (SR) strike rate (events won / competed); (W–L) win–loss record.

=== Singles ===
Tournament	1984	1985	1986	1987	1988	1989	1990	1991	1992	1993	1994	1995	1996	SR	W–L	Win %
Grand Slam tournaments
Australian Open	A	A	NH	A	A	SF	3R	QF	SF	SF	SF	1R	4R	0 / 8	30–8	79%
French Open	A	SF	4R	SF	SF	4R	4R	SF	SF	QF	1R	QF	A	0 / 11	43–11	80%
Wimbledon	A	3R	SF	QF	4R	2R	SF	F	SF	QF	4R	QF	A	0 / 11	43–11	80%
US Open	3R	1R	4R	QF	F	SF	W	QF	QF	QF	SF	SF	3R	1 / 13	52–12	81%
Win–loss	2–1	7–3	11–3	13–3	14–3	14–4	17–3	19–4	19–4	17–4	13–4	13–4	5–2	1 / 43	168–42	80%
Year-end championships
WTA Finals (Note: Formerly known as WTA Tour Championships until 2014.)	A	A	1R	F	W	SF	F	SF	SF	1R	W	QF	A	2 / 10	21–9	70%
National representation
Summer Olympics	A	Not Held			S	Not Held			A	Not Held			3R	0 / 2	6–2	75%
Billie Jean King Cup (Note: Formerly known as Fed Cup until 2020.)	1R	QF	SF	QF	A	A	A	A	A	A	A	WG-P	A	0 / 4	13–3	81%
Tier I / Category 4-6 tournaments
Miami Open	Uncategorized			4R	4R	W	QF	F	F	SF	QF	SF	QF	1 / 10	40–9	82%
Berlin Open	Uncategorized			A	A	F	3R	3R	A	F	3R	3R	A	0 / 6	12–6	67%
Canadian Open	Uncategorized			QF	W	SF	SF	SF	A	3R	QF	SF	3R	1 / 9	24–8	75%
Charleston Open	Uncategorized			SF	F	A	A	W	W	SF	2R	2R	2R	2 / 8	20–6	77%
Italian Open	Uncateg.		NH	Categ. 3		W	SF	W	W	F	2R	3R	A	3 / 7	23–4	85%
Pan Pacific Open	Uncategorized			W	A	QF	Tier II			A	2R	A	1R	1 / 4	6–3	67%
Zürich Open	Uncategorized				C3	A	Tier II			A	A	A	1R	0 / 1	0–1	0%
Philadelphia Championships	Not Held							Tier II		QF	SF	QF	T2	0 / 3	6–3	67%
Florida Slims	Uncategorized			SF	W	3R	T2	W	QF	Tier II			NH	2 / 5	16–3	84%
Ameritech Cup	Uncategorized			C3	QF	A	A	Tier II						0 / 1	1–1	50%
Silicon Valley Classic (Note: Before Tiers existed, there were ‘Category’ tournaments, which no longer existed after the introduction of the Tier system. This note covers the tournaments that did not obtain Tier I status.)	Uncategorized			C3	SF	A	Tier II							0 / 1	3–1	75%
Washington Slims	Uncategorized			C3	SF	A	Tier II		Not Held					0 / 1	3–1	75%
Amelia Island Championships	Uncategorized			SF	F	W	Tier II							1 / 3	12–2	86%
Eastbourne International	Uncategorized			QF	QF	A	Tier II							0 / 2	6–2	75%
Stuttgart Open	Uncategorized			C3	1R	W	Tier II							1 / 2	5–1	83%
LA Championships	Uncategorized			SF	F	F	Tier II							0 / 3	11–3	79%
Brighton International	Uncategorized			W	A	A	Tier II						NH	1 / 1	5–0	100%
New England Slims	Uncategorized			SF	SF	SF	T2	Not Held						0 / 3	9–3	75%
Win–loss	0–0	0–0	0–0	32–8	38–10	38–6	10–4	24–3	17–2	18–6	10–7	10–6	5–5	13 / 70	202–57	78%
Career statistics
	1984	1985	1986	1987	1988	1989	1990	1991	1992	1993	1994	1995	1996	SR	W–L	Win%
Tournaments	5	19	22	19	18	16	16	16	17	18	18	17	10	Career total: 211		
Titles	0	1	1	3	4	4	2	5	5	0	1	1	0	Career total: 27		
Finals	0	3	2	5	9	7	5	7	8	3	3	3	0	Career total: 55		
Overall win–loss (Note: Only main-draw results in WTA Tour, Grand Slam tournaments, Billie Jean King Cup (Fed Cup), Hopman Cup and Olympic Games are included in win–loss records.)	9–5	51–18	52–22	64–17	65–14	58–12	49–14	62–11	65–12	51–18	42–17	44–17	14–10	27 / 211	626–187	77%
Year-end ranking	74	12	9	6	4	3	5	3	3	5	7	7	n/a	$8,785,850		

=== Doubles ===
Tournament	1984	1985	1986	1987	1988	1989	1990	1991	1992	1993	1994	1995	1996	SR	W–L	Win %
Grand Slam tournaments
Australian Open	A	A	NH	A	A	SF	2R (Note: Withdrew during the tournament. Not counted as a loss.)	3R	A	A	A	2R	QF	0 / 5	11–4	73%
French Open	A	1R	F	F	SF	F	A	SF	A	A	3R	3R	A	0 / 8	27–8	77%
Wimbledon	A	2R	A	3R	W	QF	QF	A	A	A	1R	SF	A	1 / 7	19–6	76%
US Open	A	1R	SF	SF	SF	SF	3R	A	A	A	SF	2R	SF	0 / 9	27–8	77%
Win–loss	0–0	1–3	9–2	11–2	14–2	16–4	6–2	6–2	0–0	0–0	6–3	8–4	7–2	1 / 29	84–26	76%
Year-end championships
WTA Finals	A	A	A	SF	SF	A	A	A	A	A	A	QF	A	0 / 3	3–2	60%
Career statistics
Year-end ranking	n/a	n/a	9	5	3	19	29	55	n/a	n/a	14	13	n/a			

== Grand Slam tournament finals ==
=== Singles: 3 (1 title, 2 runner–ups) ===
Result	Year	Tournament	Surface	Opponent	Score
Loss	1988	US Open	Hard	(Germany) Steffi Graf	3–6, 6–3, 1–6
Win	1990	US Open	Hard	(Germany) Steffi Graf	6–2, 7–6^{(7–4)}
Loss	1991	Wimbledon	Grass	(Germany) Steffi Graf	4–6, 6–3, 6–8

=== Women's doubles: 4 (1 title, 3 runner–ups) ===
Result	Year	Tournament	Surface	Partner	Opponents	Score
Loss	1986	French Open	Clay	(Germany) Steffi Graf	(United States) Martina Navratilova (Hungary) Andrea Temesvári	1–6, 2–6
Loss	1987	French Open	Clay	(Germany) Steffi Graf	(United States) Martina Navratilova (United States) Pam Shriver	2–6, 1–6
Win	1988	Wimbledon	Grass	(Germany) Steffi Graf	(Soviet Union) Larisa Savchenko (Soviet Union) Natasha Zvereva	6–3, 1–6, 12–10
Loss	1989	French Open	Clay	(Germany) Steffi Graf	(Soviet Union) Larisa Savchenko (Soviet Union) Natasha Zvereva	4–6, 4–6

== Other significant finals ==
=== WTA Finals ===
==== Singles: 4 (2 titles, 2 runner–ups) ====
Result	Year	Tournament	Surface	Opponent	Score	Ref
Loss	1987	Virginia Slims Championships, US	Carpet	(West Germany) Steffi Graf	6–4, 4–6, 0–6, 4–6	
Win	1988	Virginia Slims Championships, US	Carpet	(United States) Pam Shriver	7–5, 6–2, 6–2	
Loss	1990	Virginia Slims Championships, US	Carpet	(Socialist Federal Republic of Yugoslavia) Monica Seles	4–6, 7–5, 6–3, 4–6, 2–6	
Win	1994	Virginia Slims Championships, US	Carpet	(United States) Lindsay Davenport	6–3, 6–2, 6–4	

=== Tier I / Category 4-6 tournaments ===
==== Singles: 22 (13 titles, 9 runner-ups) ====
Result	Year	Tournament	Surface	Opponent	Score
Win	1987	Pan Pacific Open	Carpet	(Bulgaria) Manuela Maleeva	6–4, 7–6^{(8–6)}
Win	1987	Brighton International	Carpet	(United States) Pam Shriver	7–5, 6–4
Win	1988	Virginia Slims of Florida	Hard	(West Germany) Steffi Graf	2–6, 6–3, 6–1
Loss	1988	Charleston Open	Clay	(United States) Martina Navratilova	1–6, 6–4, 4–6
Loss	1988	Amelia Island Championships	Clay	(United States) Martina Navratilova	0–6, 2–6
Loss	1988	LA Championships	Hard	(United States) Chris Evert	6–2, 1–6, 1–6
Win	1988	Canadian Open	Hard	(Soviet Union) Natasha Zvereva	6–1, 6–2
Win	1989	Miami Open	Hard	(United States) Chris Evert	6–1, 4–6, 6–2
Win	1989	Amelia Island Championships	Clay	(West Germany) Steffi Graf	3–6, 6–3, 7–5
Win	1989	Italian Open	Clay	(Spain) Arantxa Sánchez Vicario	6–2, 5–7, 6–4
Loss	1989	Berlin Open	Clay	(West Germany) Steffi Graf	3–6, 1–6
Loss	1989	LA Championships	Hard	(United States) Martina Navratilova	0–6, 2–6
Win	1989	Stuttgart Open	Carpet	(United States) Mary Joe Fernández	7–6^{(7–5)}, 6–4
Win	1991	Virginia Slims of Florida (2)	Hard	(Germany) Steffi Graf	6–4, 7–6^{(8–6)}
Loss	1991	Miami Open	Hard	(Socialist Federal Republic of Yugoslavia) Monica Seles	3–6, 5–7
Win	1991	Charleston Open	Clay	(Soviet Union) Leila Meskhi	6–1, 6–1
Win	1991	Italian Open (2)	Clay	(Socialist Federal Republic of Yugoslavia) Monica Seles	6–3, 6–2
Loss	1992	Miami Open	Hard	(Spain) Arantxa Sánchez Vicario	1–6, 4–6
Win	1992	Charleston Open (2)	Clay	(Spain) Conchita Martínez	6–1, 6–4
Win	1992	Italian Open (3)	Clay	(Federal Republic of Yugoslavia) Monica Seles	7–5, 6–4
Loss	1993	Italian Open	Clay	(Spain) Conchita Martínez	5–7, 1–6
Loss	1993	Berlin Open	Clay	(Germany) Steffi Graf	6–7^{(3–7)}, 6–2, 4–6

==== Doubles: 10 (4 titles, 6 runner-ups) ====
Result	Year	Tournament	Surface	Partner	Opponents	Score
Win	1987	Amelia Island Championships	Clay	(West Germany) Steffi Graf	(Czechoslovakia) Hana Mandlíková (Australia) Wendy Turnbull	3–6, 6–3, 7–5
Loss	1988	Virginia Slims of Washington	Carpet	(Czechoslovakia) Helena Suková	(United States) Martina Navratilova (United States) Pam Shriver	3–6, 4–6
Win	1988	Miami Open	Hard	(West Germany) Steffi Graf	(United States) Gigi Fernández (United States) Zina Garrison	7–6^{(7–3)}, 6–3
Loss	1988	Charleston Open	Clay	(West Germany) Claudia Kohde-Kilsch	(United States) Martina Navratilova (United States) Lori McNeil	4–6, 3–6
Loss	1988	Virginia Slims of New England	Carpet	(Czechoslovakia) Helena Suková	(United States) Martina Navratilova (United States) Pam Shriver	3–6, 6–3, 5–7
Win	1990	Canadian Open	Hard	(United States) Betsy Nagelsen	(Canada) Helen Kelesi (Italy) Raffaella Reggi	3–6, 6–2, 6–2
Loss	1994	Italian Open	Clay	(Netherlands) Brenda Schultz	(United States) Gigi Fernández (Belarus) Natasha Zvereva	1–6, 3–6
Loss	1994	Philadelphia Championships	Carpet	(Netherlands) Brenda Schultz	(United States) Gigi Fernández (Belarus) Natasha Zvereva	6–4, 4–6, 2–6
Loss	1995	Berlin Open	Clay	(Latvia) Larisa Neiland	(South Africa) Amanda Coetzer (Argentina) Inés Gorrochategui	6–4, 6–7^{(3–7)}, 2–6
Win	1995	Canadian Open (2)	Hard	(Netherlands) Brenda Schultz	(Switzerland) Martina Hingis (Croatia) Iva Majoli	4–6, 6–0, 6–3

=== Summer Olympics ===
==== Singles: 1 (silver medal) ====
Result	Year	Tournament	Surface	Opponent	Score	Ref
Silver	1988	Seoul Olympics, South Korea	Hard	(West Germany) Steffi Graf	3–6, 3–6	

== WTA Tour finals ==
=== Singles: 55 (27 titles, 28 runner–ups) ===
Legend Grand Slam (1–2) Year-end [Finals] (2–2) Olympics (0–1) Tier I [Category 4/5] (13–9) Tier II [Category 3] (7–10) Tier III/IV/V [Category 1] (3–1) Uncategorized (1–3)	Surface Hard (9–7) Grass (0–1) Clay (11–13) Carpet (7–7)

Result	W–L	Date	Tournament	Tier	Surface	Opponent	Score
Loss	0–1	Apr 1985	Charleston Open, United States	Uncategorized	Clay	(United States) Chris Evert-Lloyd	4–6, 2–6
Win	1–1	Oct 1985	Japan Open, Japan	Uncategorized	Hard	(United States) Linda Gates	6–3, 6–4
Loss	1–2	Nov 1985	Eckerd Open, United States	Uncategorized	Hard	(United States) Stephanie Rehe	4–6, 7–6^{(7–4)}, 5–7
Loss	1–3	Apr 1986	Clay Court Championships, United States	Uncategorized	Clay	(West Germany) Steffi Graf	6–2, 6–7^{(5–7)}, 4–6
Win	2–3	Dec 1986	Argentine Open, Argentina	Category 1	Clay	(Spain) Arantxa Sánchez Vicario	6–1, 6–1
Loss	2–4	May 1987	Italian Open, Italy	Category 3	Clay	(West Germany) Steffi Graf	5–7, 6–4, 0–6
Win	3–4	Sep 1987	Pan Pacific Open, Japan	Category 4	Carpet	(Bulgaria) Manuela Maleeva	6–4, 7–6^{(8–6)}
Win	4–4	Oct 1987	Brighton International, United Kingdom	Category 4	Carpet	(United States) Pam Shriver	7–5, 6–4
Loss	4–5	Nov 1987	WTA Finals, United States	Finals	Carpet	(West Germany) Steffi Graf	6–4, 4–6, 0–6, 4–6
Win	5–5	Nov 1987	Argentine Open, Argentina	Category 1	Clay	(West Germany) Isabel Cueto	6–0, 6–2
Win	6–5	Mar 1988	Virginia Slims of Florida, United States	Category 5	Hard	(West Germany) Steffi Graf	2–6, 6–3, 6–1
Loss	6–6	Apr 1988	Charleston Open, United States	Category 5	Clay	(United States) Martina Navratilova	1–6, 6–4, 4–6
Loss	6–7	Apr 1988	Amelia Island Championships, United States	Category 5	Clay	(United States) Martina Navratilova	0–6, 2–6
Win	7–7	May 1988	Italian Open, Italy	Category 3	Clay	(Canada) Helen Kelesi	6–1, 6–7^{(4–7)}, 6–1
Loss	7–8	Aug 1988	LA Championships, United States	Category 5	Hard	(United States) Chris Evert	6–2, 1–6, 1–6
Win	8–8	Aug 1988	Canadian Open, Canada	Category 5	Hard	(Soviet Union) Natasha Zvereva	6–1, 6–2
Loss	8–9	Aug 1988	US Open, United States	Grand Slam	Hard	(West Germany) Steffi Graf	3–6, 6–3, 1–6
Loss	8–10	Sep 1988	Seoul Olympics, South Korea	Olympics	Hard	(West Germany) Steffi Graf	3–6, 3–6
Win	9–10	Nov 1988	WTA Finals, United States	Finals	Carpet	(United States) Pam Shriver	7–5, 6–2, 6–2
Win	10–10	Mar 1989	Miami Open, United States	Category 5	Hard	(United States) Chris Evert	6–1, 4–6, 6–2
Win	11–10	Apr 1989	Amelia Island Championships, United States	Category 5	Clay	(West Germany) Steffi Graf	3–6, 6–3, 7–5
Loss	11–11	Apr 1989	Eckerd Open, United States	Category 3	Clay	(Spain) Conchita Martínez	3–6, 2–6
Win	12–11	May 1989	Italian Open, Italy	Category 5	Clay	(Spain) Arantxa Sánchez Vicario	6–2, 5–7, 6–4
Loss	12–12	May 1989	Berlin Open, Germany	Category 5	Clay	(West Germany) Steffi Graf	3–6, 1–6
Loss	12–13	Aug 1989	LA Championships, United States	Category 5	Hard	(United States) Martina Navratilova	0–6, 2–6
Win	13–13	Oct 1989	Stuttgart Open, Germany	Category 4	Carpet	(United States) Mary Joe Fernández	7–6^{(7–5)}, 6–4
Win	14–13	Mar 1990	Virginia Slims of Florida, United States	Tier II	Hard	(United States) Jennifer Capriati	6–4, 7–5
Win	15–13	Aug 1990	US Open, United States	Grand Slam	Hard	(West Germany) Steffi Graf	6–2, 7–6^{(7–4)}
Loss	15–14	Oct 1990	Zürich Open, Switzerland	Tier II	Carpet	(Germany) Steffi Graf	3–6, 2–6
Loss	15–15	Nov 1990	Virginia Slims of New England, United States	Tier II	Carpet	(Germany) Steffi Graf	6–7^{(5–7)}, 3–6
Loss	15–16	Nov 1990	WTA Finals, United States	Finals	Carpet	(Socialist Federal Republic of Yugoslavia) Monica Seles	4–6, 7–5, 6–3, 4–6, 2–6
Win	16–16	Jan 1991	Pan Pacific Open, Japan	Tier II	Carpet	(United States) Martina Navratilova	2–6, 6–2, 6–4
Win	17–16	Mar 1991	Virginia Slims of Florida, United States	Tier I	Hard	(Germany) Steffi Graf	6–4, 7–6^{(8–6)}
Loss	17–17	Mar 1991	Miami Open, United States	Tier I	Hard	(Socialist Federal Republic of Yugoslavia) Monica Seles	3–6, 5–7
Win	18–17	Apr 1991	Charleston Open, United States	Tier I	Clay	(Soviet Union) Leila Meskhi	6–1, 6–1
Win	19–17	Apr 1991	Amelia Island Championships, United States	Tier II	Clay	(Germany) Steffi Graf	7–5, 7–6^{(7–3)}
Win	20–17	May 1991	Italian Open, Italy	Tier I	Clay	(Socialist Federal Republic of Yugoslavia) Monica Seles	6–3, 6–2
Loss	20–18	Jun 1991	Wimbledon Championships, United Kingdom	Grand Slam	Grass	(Germany) Steffi Graf	4–6, 6–3, 6–8
Win	21–18	Jan 1992	Sydney International, Australia	Tier III	Hard	(Spain) Arantxa Sánchez Vicario	6–1, 6–1
Win	22–18	Jan 1992	Pan Pacific Open, Japan	Tier II	Carpet	(United States) Martina Navratilova	6–2, 4–6, 6–2
Loss	22–19	Mar 1992	Miami Open, United States	Tier I	Hard	(Spain) Arantxa Sánchez Vicario	1–6, 4–6
Win	23–19	Mar 1992	Charleston Open, United States	Tier I	Clay	(Spain) Conchita Martínez	6–1, 6–4
Win	24–19	Apr 1992	Amelia Island Championships, United States	Tier II	Clay	(Germany) Steffi Graf	6–2, 1–6, 6–3
Win	25–19	May 1992	Italian Open, Italy	Tier I	Clay	(Federal Republic of Yugoslavia) Monica Seles	7–5, 6–4
Loss	25–20	Sep 1992	Nichirei Championships, Japan	Tier II	Carpet	(Federal Republic of Yugoslavia) Monica Seles	2–6, 0–6
Loss	25–21	Oct 1992	stuttgart Open, Germany	Tier II	Carpet	(United States) Martina Navratilova	6–7^{(1–7)}, 3–6
Loss	25–22	Apr 1993	Amelia Island Championships, United States	Tier II	Clay	(Spain) Arantxa Sánchez Vicario	2–6, 7–5, 2–6
Loss	25–23	May 1993	Italian Open, Italy	Tier I	Clay	(Spain) Conchita Martínez	5–7, 1–6
Loss	25–24	May 1993	Berlin Open, Germany	Tier I	Clay	(Germany) Steffi Graf	6–7^{(3–7)}, 6–2, 4–6
Loss	25–25	Apr 1994	Amelia Island Championships, United States	Tier II	Clay	(Spain) Arantxa Sánchez Vicario	1–6, 4–6
Loss	25–26	May 1994	Internationaux de Strasbourg, France	Tier III	Clay	(United States) Mary Joe Fernández	6–2, 4–6, 0–6
Win	26–26	Nov 1994	WTA Finals, United States	Finals	Carpet	(United States) Lindsay Davenport	6–3, 6–2, 6–4
Win	27–26	Jan 1995	sydney International, Australia	Tier II	Hard	(United States) Lindsay Davenport	6–3, 6–4
Loss	27–27	Apr 1995	Amelia Island Championships, United States	Tier II	Clay	(Spain) Conchita Martínez	1–6, 4–6
Loss	27–28	Oct 1995	stuttgart Open, Germany	Tier II	Carpet	(Croatia) Iva Majoli	4–6, 6–7^{(4–7)}

=== Doubles: 30 (14 titles, 16 runner–ups) ===
Legend Grand Slam (1–3) Tier I [Category 4/5/6] (4–6) Tier II [Category 3] (2–3) Tier III/IV/V [Category 1] (1–0) Uncategorized (6–4)	Surface Hard (6–2) Grass (1–0) Clay (5–8) Carpet (2–6)

Result	W–L	Date	Tournament	Tier	Surface	Partner	Opponents	Score
Win	1–0	Mar 1985	Brazil Open, Brazil	Uncategorized	Clay	(Argentina) Mercedes Paz	(Hungary) Csilla Bartos (Brazil) Neige Dias	7–5, 6–4
Loss	1–1	Mar 1985	Palm Beach Cup, United States	Uncategorized	Clay	(Peru) Laura Gildemeister	(United States) JoAnne Russell (United States) Anne Smith	6–1, 1–6, 6–7^{(4–7)}
Win	2–1	Aug 1985	Virginia Slims of Central New York, United States	Uncategorized	Hard	(Argentina) Mercedes Paz	(Czechoslovakia) Andrea Holíková (Czechoslovakia) Kateřina Skronská	5–7, 6–4, 6–3
Win	3–1	Nov 1985	Eckerd Open, United States	Uncategorized	Hard	(Canada) Carling Bassett	(United States) Lisa Bonder (Peru) Laura Gildemeister	6–0, 6–0
Loss	3–2	Apr 1986	Amelia Island Championships, United States	Uncategorized	Clay	(France) Catherine Tanvier	(West Germany) Claudia Kohde-Kilsch (Czechoslovakia) Helena Suková	2–6, 7–5, 6–7^{(7–9)}
Win	4–2	Apr 1986	Clay Court Championships, United States	Uncategorized	Clay	(West Germany) Steffi Graf	(United States) Gigi Fernández (United States) Robin White	6–2, 6–0
Loss	4–3	May 1986	French Open, France	Grand Slam	Clay	(West Germany) Steffi Graf	(United States) Martina Navratilova (Hungary) Andrea Temesvári	1–6, 2–6
Win	5–3	Aug 1986	Canadian Open, Canada	Uncategorized	Hard	(United States) Zina Garrison	(United States) Pam Shriver (Czechoslovakia) Helena Suková	7–6^{(7–2)}, 5–7, 6–4
Win	6–3	Oct 1986	Zürich Open, Switzerland	Uncategorized	Carpet	(West Germany) Steffi Graf	(United States) Lori McNeil (United States) Alycia Moulton	1–6, 6–4, 6–4
Loss	6–4	Oct 1986	Stuttgart Open, Germany	Uncategorized	Carpet	(United States) Zina Garrison	(United States) Martina Navratilova (United States) Pam Shriver	6–7^{(5–7)}, 4–6
Loss	6–5	Nov 1986	Ameritech Cup, United States	Uncategorized	Carpet	(West Germany) Steffi Graf	(West Germany) Claudia Kohde-Kilsch (Czechoslovakia) Helena Suková	7–6^{(7–5)}, 6–7^{(5–7)}, 3–6
Loss	6–6	Feb 1987	Silicon Valley Classic, United States	Category 3	Carpet	(United States) Zina Garrison	(Czechoslovakia) Hana Mandlíková (Australia) Wendy Turnbull	4–6, 6–7^{(4–7)}
Win	7–6	Apr 1987	Amelia Island Championships, United States	Category 4	Clay	(West Germany) Steffi Graf	(Czechoslovakia) Hana Mandlíková (Australia) Wendy Turnbull	3–6, 6–3, 7–5
Win	8–6	May 1987	Italian Open, Italy	Category 3	Clay	(United States) Martina Navratilova	(West Germany) Claudia Kohde-Kilsch (Czechoslovakia) Helena Suková	6–4, 6–1
Loss	8–7	May 1987	French Open, France	Grand Slam	Clay	(West Germany) Steffi Graf	(United States) Martina Navratilova (United States) Pam Shriver	2–6, 1–6
Win	9–7	Nov 1987	Argentine Open, Argentina	Category 1	Clay	(Argentina) Mercedes Paz	(Canada) Jill Hetherington (Switzerland) Christiane Jolissaint	6–2, 6–2
Loss	9–8	Feb 1988	Virginia Slims of Washington, United States	Category 5	Carpet	(Czechoslovakia) Helena Suková	(United States) Martina Navratilova (United States) Pam Shriver	3–6, 4–6
Win	10–8	Mar 1988	Miami Open, United States	Category 6	Hard	(West Germany) Steffi Graf	(United States) Gigi Fernández (United States) Zina Garrison	7–6^{(7–3)}, 6–3
Loss	10–9	Apr 1988	Charleston Open, United States	Category 5	Clay	(West Germany) Claudia Kohde-Kilsch	(United States) Martina Navratilova (United States) Lori McNeil	4–6, 3–6
Win	11–9	Jun 1988	Wimbledon Championships, United Kingdom	Grand Slam	Grass	(West Germany) Steffi Graf	(Soviet Union) Larisa Savchenko (Soviet Union) Natasha Zvereva	6–3, 1–6, 12–10
Loss	11–10	Oct 1988	Virginia Slims of New England, United States	Category 5	Carpet	(Czechoslovakia) Helena Suková	(United States) Martina Navratilova (United States) Pam Shriver	3–6, 6–3, 5–7
Loss	11–11	May 1989	French Open, France	Grand Slam	Clay	(West Germany) Steffi Graf	(Soviet Union) Larisa Savchenko (Soviet Union) Natasha Zvereva	4–6, 4–6
Win	12–11	Jul 1990	Canadian Open, Canada	Tier I	Hard	(United States) Betsy Nagelsen	(Canada) Helen Kelesi (Italy) Raffaella Reggi	3–6, 6–2, 6–2
Loss	12–12	Aug 1990	LA Championships, United States	Tier II	Hard	(Argentina) Mercedes Paz	(United States) Gigi Fernández (Czechoslovakia) Jana Novotná	3–6, 5–7
Loss	12–13	May 1994	Italian Open, Italy	Tier I	Clay	(Netherlands) Brenda Schultz	(United States) Gigi Fernández (Belarus) Natasha Zvereva	1–6, 3–6
Loss	12–14	Nov 1994	Philadelphia Championships, United States	Tier I	Carpet	(Netherlands) Brenda Schultz	(United States) Gigi Fernández (Belarus) Natasha Zvereva	6–4, 4–6, 2–6
Win	13–14	Feb 1995	Ameritech Cup, United States	Tier II	Carpet	(Netherlands) Brenda Schultz	(United States) Marianne Werdel (United States) Tami Whitlinger	5–7, 7–6^{(7–4)}, 6–4
Loss	13–15	May 1995	Berlin Open, Germany	Tier I	Clay	(Latvia) Larisa Neiland	(South Africa) Amanda Coetzer (Argentina) Inés Gorrochategui	6–4, 6–7^{(3–7)}, 2–6
Loss	13–16	Aug 1995	LA Championships, United States	Tier II	Hard	(Latvia) Larisa Neiland	(United States) Gigi Fernández (Belarus) Natasha Zvereva	5–7, 7–6^{(7–2)}, 5–7
Win	14–16	Aug 1995	Canadian Open, Canada	Tier I	Hard	(Netherlands) Brenda Schultz	(Switzerland) Martina Hingis (Croatia) Iva Majoli	4–6, 6–0, 6–3

== WTA Tour career earnings ==
- Grand Slam titles, WTA titles, Total titles – includes singles, doubles and mixed doubles titles.

Year	Grand Slam titles	WTA titles	Total titles	Earnings ($)	Money list rank
1984	0	0	0	n/a	n/a
1985	0	4	4	n/a	n/a
1986	0	4	4	264,139	8
1987	0	6	6	465,933	6
1988	1	5	6	995,399	3
1989	0	4	4	580,801	3
1990	1	2	3	975,490	4
1991	0	5	5	1,168,561	3
1992	0	5	5	1,207,565	4
1993	0	0	0	957,680	5
1994	0	1	1	874,470	6
1995	0	3	3	718,978	6
1996	0	0	0	178,050	37
Career	2	39	41	8,785,850	96

== Wins against top 10 players ==
- Sabatini has a 82–111 record against players who were, at the time the match was played, ranked in the top 10.

No.	Player	Rk	Event	Surface	Rd	Score	Rk	Years	Ref
1	(United States) Zina Garrison	9	Charleston Open, United States	Clay	3R	6–4, 6–0	33	1985	
2	(United States) Pam Shriver	8	Charleston Open, United States	Clay	QF	5–7, 7–5, 6–4	33	1985	
3	(Bulgaria) Manuela Maleeva	5	Charleston Open, United States	Clay	SF	6–1, 7–6	33	1985	
4	(Bulgaria) Manuela Maleeva	4	French Open, France	Clay	QF	6–3, 1–6, 7–5	17	1985	
5	(United States) Pam Shriver	3	WTA New Jersey, United States	Hard	QF	6–4, 7–5	12	1985	
6	(United States) Zina Garrison	6	Fed Cup, Nagoya, Japan	Hard	RR	5–7, 6–1, 6–1	12	1985	
7	(Bulgaria) Manuela Maleeva	10	Clay Court Championships, United States	Clay	SF	6–4, 6–4	12	1986	
8	(Germany) Claudia Kohde Kilsch	8	Charleston Open, United States	Clay	QF	7–6, 6–4	9	1987	
9	(United States) Martina Navratilova	1	Italian Open, Italy	Clay	SF	7–6, 6–1	9	1987	
10	(Czech Republic) Hana Mandlíková	4	LA Championships, United States	Hard	QF	7–6, 2–6, 7–5	8	1987	
11	(Bulgaria) Manuela Maleeva	10	Pan Pacific Open, Japan	Carpet	F	6–4, 7–6	8	1987	
12	(Czech Republic) Helena Suková	7	Stuttgart Open, Germany	Carpet	QF	6–7, 7–6, 6–3	6	1987	
13	(Czech Republic) Helena Suková	7	Brighton International, United Kingdom	Carpet	SF	6–1, 6–3	6	1987	
14	(United States) Pam Shriver	5	Brighton International, United Kingdom	Carpet	F	7–5, 6–4	6	1987	
15	(United States) Martina Navratilova	2	WTA Finals, United States	Carpet	QF	6–4, 7–5	6	1987	
16	(Bulgaria) Manuela Maleeva	8	WTA Finals, United States	Carpet	SF	6–3, 4–6, 6–3	6	1987	
17	(United States) Chris Evert	3	Virginia Slims of Florida, United States	Hard	SF		5	1988	
18	(Germany) Steffi Graf	1	Virginia Slims of Florida, United States	Hard	F		5	1988	
19	(Germany) Steffi Graf	1	Amelia Island Championships, United States	Clay	SF		5	1988	
20	(United States) Lori McNeil	9	Canadian Open, Canada	Hard	QF		5	1988	
21	(United States) Chris Evert	3	Canadian Open, Canada	Hard	SF		5	1988	
22	(Soviet Union) Natasha Zvereva	8	Canadian Open, Canada	Hard	F		5	1988	
23	(Soviet Union) Natasha Zvereva	7	Seoul Olympics, South Korea	Hard	QF		4	1988	
24	(Bulgaria) Manuela Maleeva	8	Seoul Olympics, South Korea	Hard	SF		4	1988	
25	(Soviet Union) Natasha Zvereva	6	WTA Finals, United States	Carpet	QF		4	1988	
26	(Czech Republic) Helena Suková	8	WTA Finals, United States	Carpet	SF		4	1988	
27	(United States) Pam Shriver	5	WTA Finals, United States	Carpet	F		4	1988	
28	(United States) Zina Garrison	9	Australian Open, Australia	Hard	QF		4	1989	
29	(Czech Republic) Helena Suková	5	Miami Open, United States	Hard	SF		3	1989	
30	(United States) Chris Evert	4	Miami Open, United States	Hard	F		3	1989	
31	(United States) Martina Navratilova	2	Amelia Island Championships, United States	Clay	SF		3	1989	
32	(Germany) Steffi Graf	1	Amelia Island Championships, United States	Clay	F		3	1989	
33	(United States) Pam Shriver	9	LA Championships, United States	Hard	SF		3	1989	
34	(Spain) Arantxa Sánchez Vicario	5	US Open, United States	Hard	QF		3	1989	
35	(United States) Zina Garrison	5	WTA Finals, United States	Carpet	QF		3	1989	
36	(United States) Mary Joe Fernández	8	Virginia Slims of Florida, United States	Hard	SF		3	1990	
37	(United States) Mary Joe Fernández	8	US Open, United States	Hard	SF		5	1990	
38	(Germany) Steffi Graf	1	US Open, United States	Hard	F		5	1990	
39	(United States) Mary Joe Fernández	5	Virginia Slims of New England, United States	Carpet	SF		4	1990	
40	(Germany) Steffi Graf	1	WTA Finals, United States	Carpet	SF		5	1990	
41	(Germany) Steffi Graf	1	Pan Pacific Open, Japan	Carpet	QF		4	1991	
42	(United States) Mary Joe Fernández	5	Pan Pacific Open, Japan	Carpet	SF		4	1991	
43	(United States) Martina Navratilova	3	Pan Pacific Open, Japan	Carpet	F		4	1991	
44	(Germany) Steffi Graf	1	Virginia Slims of Florida, United States	Hard	F		4	1991	
45	(United States) Zina Garrison	9	Miami Open, United States	Hard	QF		4	1991	
46	(Germany) Steffi Graf	2	Miami Open, United States	Hard	SF		4	1991	
47	(Spain) Arantxa Sánchez Vicario	7	Charleston Open, United States	Clay	SF		4	1991	
48	(Spain) Arantxa Sánchez Vicario	5	Amelia Island Championships, United States	Clay	SF		4	1991	
49	(Germany) Steffi Graf	2	Amelia Island Championships, United States	Clay	F		4	1991	
50	(Spain) Conchita Martínez	8	Italian Open, Italy	Clay	SF		3	1991	
51	(Socialist Federal Republic of Yugoslavia) Monica Seles	1	Italian Open, Italy	Clay	F		3	1991	
52	(Czech Republic) Jana Novotná	7	French Open, France	Clay	QF		3	1991	
53	(Czech Republic) Jana Novotná	9	US Open, United States	Hard	4R		3	1991	
54	(Spain) Conchita Martínez	9	Philadelphia Championships, United States	Carpet	QF		3	1991	
55	(United States) Jennifer Capriati	6	WTA Finals, United States	Carpet	QF		3	1991	

- Key: (Rk) first use, opponent rank; (Rd) round; (Rk) 2nd use, player rank; (Ref) reference; (F) final; (SF) semifinal; (QF) quarterfinal; (#R) rounds 4, 3, 2, 1; (RR) round-robin stage

== Longest winning streaks ==
=== First 16–match singles winning streak (1989) ===
#	Tournament	Category	Start date	Surface	Rd	Opponent	Rank	Score	GSR
–	Virginia Slims of Florida, United States	Category 5	13 March 1989	Hard	3R	(United States) Terry Phelps	39	2–6, 6–7	3
1	Miami Open, United States	Category 5	20 March 1989	Hard	1R	(United States) Elly Hakami	75	6–0, 6–3	3
2	Miami Open, United States	Category 5	20 March 1989	Hard	2R	(France) Catherine Suire	149	6–0, 6–0	3
3	Miami Open, United States	Category 5	20 March 1989	Hard	3R	(New Zealand) Belinda Cordwell (23)	36	6–2, 6–1	3
4	Miami Open, United States	Category 5	20 March 1989	Hard	4R	(United States) Ann Grossman	54	6–4, 7–6	3
5	Miami Open, United States	Category 5	20 March 1989	Hard	QF	(France) Isabelle Demongeot (25)	38	6–1, 7–5	3
6	Miami Open, United States	Category 5	20 March 1989	Hard	SF	(Czechoslovakia) Helena Suková (3)	5	6–7, 6–3, 6–4	3
7	Miami Open, United States	Category 5	20 March 1989	Hard	F	(United States) Chris Evert (2)	4	6–1, 4–6, 6–2	3
–	Amelia Island Championships, United States	Category 5	10 April 1989	Clay	1R	bye			3
8	Amelia Island Championships, United States	Category 5	10 April 1989	Clay	2R	(Argentina) Mercedes Paz	47	6–3, 4–6, 6–2	3
9	Amelia Island Championships, United States	Category 5	10 April 1989	Clay	3R	(Czechoslovakia) Jana Pospíšilová	52	6–3, 6–3	3
10	Amelia Island Championships, United States	Category 5	10 April 1989	Clay	QF	(Greece) Angeliki Kanellopoulou	72	3–6, 6–4, 6–3	3
11	Amelia Island Championships, United States	Category 5	10 April 1989	Clay	SF	(United States) Martina Navratilova (2)	2	6–3, 6–2	3
12	Amelia Island Championships, United States	Category 5	10 April 1989	Clay	F	(West Germany) Steffi Graf (1)	1	3–6, 6–3, 7–5	3
13	Eckerd Open, United States	Category 3	17 April 1989	Clay	1R	(Argentina) Bettina Fulco	30	7–5, 6–2	3
14	Eckerd Open, United States	Category 3	17 April 1989	Clay	2R	(West Germany) Isabel Cueto	32	6–1, 6–1	3
15	Eckerd Open, United States	Category 3	17 April 1989	Clay	QF	(Italy) Linda Ferrando	62	6–2, 6–3	3
16	Eckerd Open, United States	Category 3	17 April 1989	Clay	SF	(Spain) Arantxa Sánchez Vicario (4)	18	6–4, 6–4	3
–	Eckerd Open, United States	Category 3	17 April 1989	Clay	F	(Spain) Conchita Martínez (8)	25	3–6, 2–6	3

=== Second 16–match singles winning streak (1991) ===
#	Tournament	Category	Start date	Surface	Rd	Opponent	Rank	Score	GSR
–	Miami Open, United States	Tier I	18 March 1991	Hard	F	(Socialist Federal Republic of Yugoslavia) Monica Seles (2)	1	3–6, 5–7	4
–	Family Circle Cup, United States	Tier I	1 April 1991	Hard	1R	bye			4
1	Family Circle Cup, United States	Tier I	1 April 1991	Hard	2R	(United States) Linda Harvey-Wild	94	6–0, 6–0	4
2	Family Circle Cup, United States	Tier I	1 April 1991	Hard	3R	(Canada) Helen Kelesi (10)	19	6–3, 6–2	4
3	Family Circle Cup, United States	Tier I	1 April 1991	Hard	QF	(Czechoslovakia) Helena Suková (7)	13	6–0, 6–1	4
4	Family Circle Cup, United States	Tier I	1 April 1991	Hard	SF	(Spain) Arantxa Sánchez Vicario (3)	7	4–6, 6–4, 6–3	4
5	Family Circle Cup, United States	Tier I	1 April 1991	Hard	F	(Soviet Union) Leila Meskhi (9)	17	6–1, 6–1	4
–	Amelia Island Championships, United States	Tier II	8 April 1991	Clay	1R	bye			4
6	Amelia Island Championships, United States	Tier II	8 April 1991	Clay	2R	(Italy) Federica Bonsignori	40	6–1, 6–0	4
7	Amelia Island Championships, United States	Tier II	8 April 1991	Clay	3R	(United States) Luanne Spadea (Q)	243	6–0, 6–1	4
8	Amelia Island Championships, United States	Tier II	8 April 1991	Clay	QF	(Czechoslovakia) Helena Suková (5)	13	6–2, 6–1	4
9	Amelia Island Championships, United States	Tier II	8 April 1991	Clay	SF	(Spain) Arantxa Sánchez Vicario (3)	5	6–2, 2–6, 6–4	4
10	Amelia Island Championships, United States	Tier II	8 April 1991	Clay	F	(Germany) Steffi Graf (1)	2	7–5, 7–6	4
–	Italian Open, Italy	Tier I	6 May 1991	Clay	1R	bye			3
11	Italian Open, Italy	Tier I	6 May 1991	Clay	2R	(South Africa) Amanda Coetzer	103	6–2, 6–2	3
12	Italian Open, Italy	Tier I	6 May 1991	Clay	3R	(France) Nathalie Tauziat (9)	15	6–0, 6–1	3
13	Italian Open, Italy	Tier I	6 May 1991	Clay	QF	(United States) Jennifer Capriati (7)	12	6–0, 6–2	3
14	Italian Open, Italy	Tier I	6 May 1991	Clay	SF	(Spain) Conchita Martínez (5)	8	6–1, 6–0	3
15	Italian Open, Italy	Tier I	6 May 1991	Clay	F	(Socialist Federal Republic of Yugoslavia) Monica Seles (1)	1	6–3, 6–2	3
–	German Open, Germany	Tier I	13 May 1991	Clay	1R	bye			3
16	German Open, Germany	Tier I	13 May 1991	Clay	2R	(Japan) Naoko Sawamatsu	57	6–1, 6–0	3
–	German Open, Germany	Tier I	13 May 1991	Clay	3R	(Germany) Anke Huber (14)	22	5–7, 3–6	3

== See also ==
- Graf–Sabatini rivalry
