= Graf–Sabatini rivalry =

Tennis rivalry

Graf–Sabatini rivalry

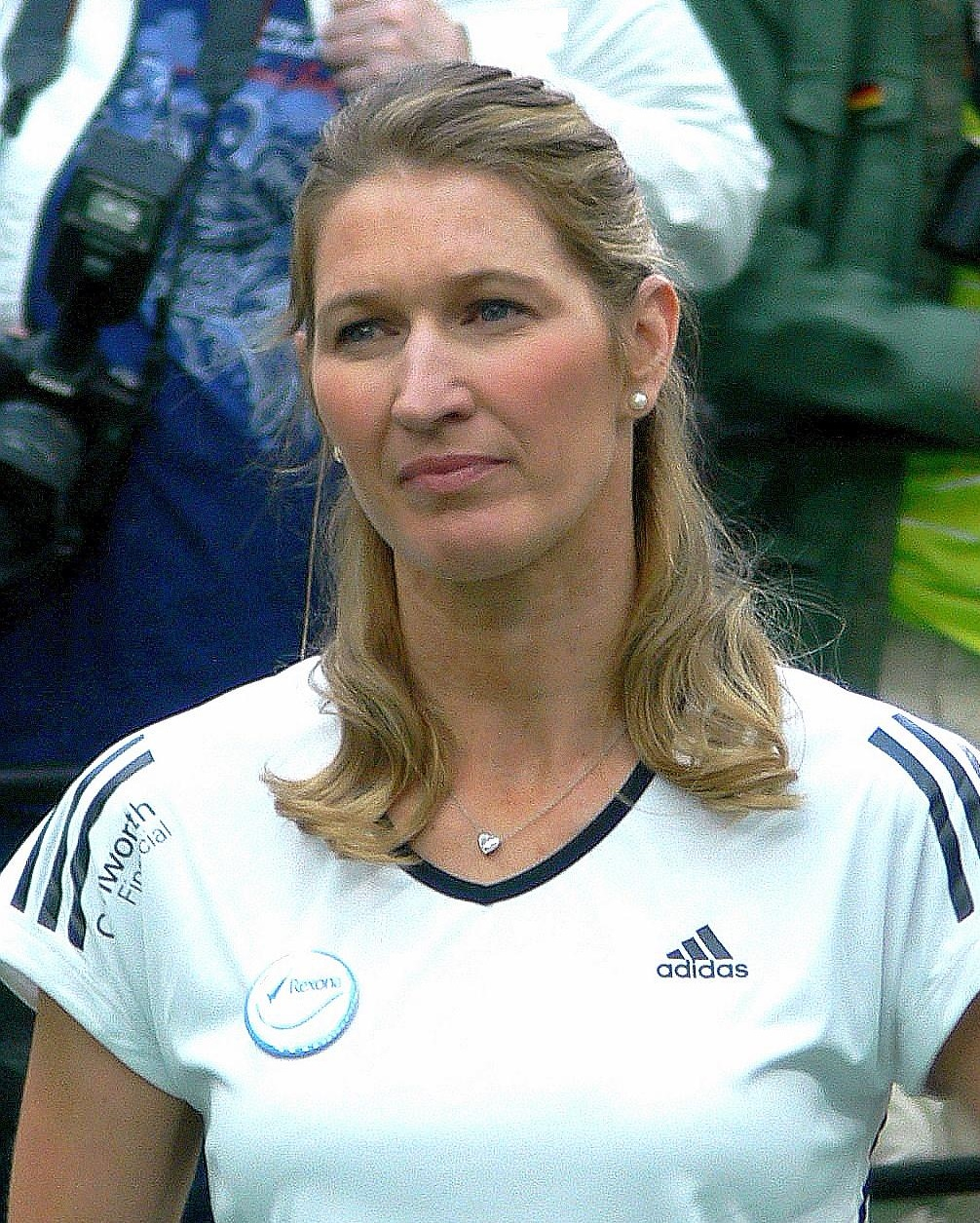
Steffi Graf

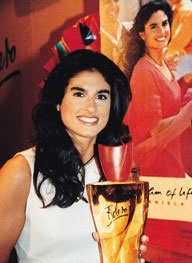
Gabriela Sabatini

The Graf–Sabatini rivalry was a tennis rivalry between Steffi Graf and Gabriela Sabatini, who played each other on 40 occasions between 1985 and 1995. Graf was the world No. 1, and Sabatini reached a career high of No. 3. Both are Major champions, Graf winning 22 titles, and Sabatini won her only major title at the 1990 US Open over Graf. They also teamed in doubles, reaching three French Open finals and winning the 1988 Wimbledon crown.

In Grand Slams, they met 12 times, three of them in finals. Graf leads 11–1. In 1988, Graf beat Sabatini in the semifinals of the French Open, the US Open final, and the Olympic final to complete the calendar-year Golden Slam. In the 1991 Wimbledon final. Sabatini was two points away from capturing the singles title, but Graf took the match 8–6 in the deciding set.

Graf and Sabatini first met in 1985, and by the end of 1987, had met a total of 11 times, Graf winning all of them. Sabatini defeated Graf 11 times in the next 21 matches they played from 1988 to 1992, with the Argentine going on a five-match winning streak and Graf on a four-match winning streak. Sabatini then lost the final eight matches they played from 1992 to 1995. According to Sabatini, they had a good relationship off the court, but were never close friends.

On September 25, 2004, Graf defeated Sabatini 6-1, 7-5 in an exhibition match in Berlin, Germany. They met the following year at an exhibition match in Mannheim, Germany on October 15, 2005, where Graf again beat Sabatini in straight sets 6-4, 6-2.

Graf introduced Sabatini during the 2006 International Tennis Hall of Fame Induction on July 15, 2006.

== List of all matches ==
Legend	Graf	Sabatini
Grand Slam	11	1
WTA Tour Championships	3	1
WTA Tour Events	13	9
Federation Cup	1	0
Olympic Games	1	0
Total	29	11

Graf–Sabatini (29–11)

No.	Date	Tournament	Surface	Round	Winner	Score	Graf	Sabatini
1.	1985	WTA New Jersey	Hard	Semifinals	Graf	4–6, 6–0, 6–3	1	0
2.	1986	Virginia Slims Championships	Carpet	Round of 16	Graf	6–0, 6–7^{(5–7)}, 6–2	2	0
3.	1986	US Clay Court Championships	Clay	Final	Graf	2–6, 7–6^{(7–5)}, 6–4	3	0
4.	1987	Charleston Open	Clay	Semifinals	Graf	6–3, 2–6, 7–6^{(7–5)}	4	0
5.	1987	Amelia Island Championships	Clay	Semifinals	Graf	6–2, 6–2	5	0
6.	1987	Italian Open	Clay	Final	Graf	7–5, 4–6, 6–0	6	0
7.	1987	Roland Garros	Clay	Semifinals	Graf	6–4, 4–6, 7–5	7	0
8.	1987	Wimbledon	Grass	Quarterfinals	Graf	4–6, 6–1, 6–1	8	0
9.	1987	Federation Cup	Hard	Quarterfinals	Graf	6–4, 6–4	9	0
10.	1987	LA Women's Tennis Championships	Hard	Semifinals	Graf	7–5, 7–5	10	0
11.	1987	Virginia Slims Championships	Carpet	Final	Graf	4–6, 6–4, 6–0, 6–4	11	0
12.	1988	Virginia Slims of Florida	Hard	Final	Sabatini	2–6, 6–3, 6–1	11	1
13.	1988	Amelia Island Championships	Clay	Semifinals	Sabatini	6–3, 4–6, 7–5	11	2
14.	1988	Roland Garros	Clay	Semifinals	Graf	6–3, 7–6^{(7–3)}	12	2
15.	1988	US Open	Hard	Final	Graf	6–3, 3–6, 6–1	13	2
16.	1988	Summer Olympics	Hard	Final	Graf	6–3, 6–3	14	2
17.	1989	Australian Open	Hard	Semifinals	Graf	6–3, 6–0	15	2
18.	1989	Amelia Island Championships	Clay	Final	Sabatini	3–6, 6–3, 7–5	15	3
19.	1989	German Open	Clay	Final	Graf	6–3, 6–1	16	3
20.	1989	US Open	Hard	Semifinals	Graf	3–6, 6–4, 6–2	17	3
21.	1989	Virginia Slims Championships	Carpet	Semifinals	Graf	6–3, 5–7, 6–1	18	3
22.	1990	US Open	Hard	Final	Sabatini	6–2, 7–6^{(7–4)}	18	4
23.	1990	Zurich Open	Carpet	Final	Graf	6–3, 6–2	19	4
24.	1990	Virginia Slims of New England	Carpet	Final	Graf	7–6^{(7–5)}, 6–3	20	4
25.	1990	Virginia Slims Championships	Carpet	Semifinals	Sabatini	6–4, 6–4	20	5
26.	1991	Pan Pacific Open	Carpet	Quarterfinals	Sabatini	4–6, 6–4, 7–6^{(8–6)}	20	6
27.	1991	Virginia Slims of Florida	Hard	Final	Sabatini	6–4, 7–6^{(8–6)}	20	7
28.	1991	Miami Open	Hard	Semifinals	Sabatini	0–6, 7–6^{(8–6)}, 6–1	20	8
29.	1991	Amelia Island Championships	Clay	Final	Sabatini	7-5, 7-6^{(7–3)}	20	9
30.	1991	Wimbledon	Grass	Final	Graf	6–4, 3–6, 8–6	21	9
31.	1992	Miami Open	Hard	Semifinals	Sabatini	3–6, 7–6^{(7–5)}, 6–1	21	10
32.	1992	Amelia Island Championships	Clay	Final	Sabatini	6–2, 1–6, 6–3	21	11
33.	1992	Wimbledon	Grass	Semifinals	Graf	6–3, 6–3	22	11
34.	1993	Miami Open	Hard	Semifinals	Graf	6–0, 6–2	23	11
35.	1993	Charleston Open	Clay	Semifinals	Graf	6–0, 7–6^{(7–3)}	24	11
36.	1993	German Open	Clay	Final	Graf	7–6^{(7–3)}, 2–6, 6–4	25	11
37.	1993	US Open	Hard	Quarterfinals	Graf	6–2, 5–7, 6–1	26	11
38.	1994	Canadian Open	Hard	Quarterfinals	Graf	7–5, 6–0	27	11
39.	1995	Roland Garros	Clay	Quarterfinals	Graf	6–1, 6–0	28	11
40.	1995	US Open	Hard	Semifinals	Graf	6–4, 7–6^{(7–5)}	29	11

== Breakdown of the rivalry ==
- Hard courts: Graf, 11–5
- Clay courts: Graf, 10–4
- Grass courts: Graf, 3–0
- Carpet courts: Graf, 5–2
- Grand Slam matches: Graf, 11–1
- Grand Slam finals: Graf, 2–1
- Year-End Championships matches: Graf, 3–1
- Year-End Championships finals: Graf, 1–0
- Fed Cup matches: Graf, 1–0
- All finals: Graf, 10–6
- All matches: Graf, 29–11
- Florida matches: Sabatini, 8-2

== See also ==
- List of tennis rivalries
