= 1989 Virginia Slims of New England – Doubles =

Doubles
- 1989 Virginia Slims of New England

Final
- Champions: (United States) Martina Navratilova (United States) Pam Shriver
- Runners-up: (United States) Elise Burgin (South Africa) Rosalyn Fairbank
- Score: 6–4, 4–6, 6–4

Details
- Draw: 16 (1WC)
- Seeds: 4

Events
Singles	Doubles
← 1988 ·	Virginia Slims of New England	· 1990 →

Martina Navratilova and Pam Shriver successfully defended their title by defeating Elise Burgin and Rosalyn Fairbank 6–4, 4–6, 6–4 in the final.

== Seeds ==
1. (United States) Martina Navratilova / (United States) Pam Shriver (champions)
2. (Australia) Elizabeth Smylie / (Australia) Wendy Turnbull (quarterfinals)
3. (United States) Elise Burgin / (South Africa) Rosalyn Fairbank (final)
4. (United States) Sandy Collins / (Soviet Union) Natasha Zvereva (first round)

== Draw ==
=== Key ===
- Q = Qualifier
- WC = Wild card
- LL = Lucky loser
- Alt = Alternate
- SE = Special exempt
- PR = Protected ranking
- ITF = ITF entry
- JE = Junior exempt
- w/o = Walkover
- r = Retired
- d = Defaulted
- SR = Special ranking

=== Draw ===
First round
1	(United States) M Navratilova (United States) P Shriver	6	6
(United States) B Bowes (United States) M Werdel	1	0
(West Germany) B Bunge (West Germany) E Pfaff	6	6
(United States) L Allen (United States) A Smith	4	4
4	(United States) S Collins (Soviet Union) N Zvereva	6^{10}	6	6^{2}
(Netherlands) B Schultz (Hungary) A Temesvári	7^{12}	4	7^{7}
(Argentina) G Castro (Spain) C Martínez	1	1
(United States) ML Daniels (United States) W White	6	6
(South Africa) L Gregory (United States) G Magers	7^{7}	6
(United States) C Benjamin (Canada) H Kelesi	6^{4}	3
(United States) L Glitz (United States) J Goodling	4	6^{5}
3	(United States) E Burgin (South Africa) R Fairbank	6	7^{7}
(United States) P Barg (United States) P Louie Harper	7	6
WC	(United States) E deLone (Argentina) F Labat	5	4
(United States) Ca MacGregor (United States) Cy MacGregor	3	3
2	(Australia) E Smylie (Australia) W Turnbull	6	6

Quarterfinals
1	(United States) M Navratilova (United States) P Shriver	6	6
(West Germany) B Bunge (West Germany) E Pfaff	1	3
(Netherlands) B Schultz (Hungary) A Temesvári	4	5
(United States) ML Daniels (United States) W White	6	7
(South Africa) L Gregory (United States) G Magers	3	4
3	(United States) E Burgin (South Africa) R Fairbank	6	6
(United States) P Barg (United States) P Louie Harper	6	2	6
2	(Australia) E Smylie (Australia) W Turnbull	4	6	4

Semifinals
1	(United States) M Navratilova (United States) P Shriver	7^{7}	6
(United States) ML Daniels (United States) W White	6^{2}	2
3	(United States) E Burgin (South Africa) R Fairbank	4	6	6
(United States) P Barg (United States) P Louie Harper	6	4	4

Final
1	(United States) M Navratilova (United States) P Shriver	6	4	6
3	(United States) E Burgin (South Africa) R Fairbank	4	6	4
