= 1988 Bausch & Lomb Championships =

- Date: April 11–17
- Edition: 9th
- Category: Category 5
- Prize money: $300,000
- Surface: Clay / outdoor
- Location: Amelia Island, Florida, U.S.
- Venue: Amelia Island Plantation

Champions

Singles
- (United States) Martina Navratilova

Doubles
- (United States) Zina Garrison / (West Germany) Eva Pfaff
← 1987 ·	Amelia Island Championships	· 1989 →

The 1988 Bausch & Lomb Championships was a women's tennis tournament played on outdoor clay courts at the Amelia Island Plantation on Amelia Island, Florida in the United States and was part of the Category 5 tier of the 1988 WTA Tour. The tournament ran from April 11 through April 17, 1988. second-seeded Martina Navratilova won the singles title.

== Finals ==
=== Singles ===
(United States) Martina Navratilova defeated (Argentina) Gabriela Sabatini 6–0, 6–2

- It was Navratilova's 5th singles title of the year and the 134rd of her career.

=== Doubles ===
(United States) Zina Garrison / (West Germany) Eva Pfaff defeated (United States) Katrina Adams / (United States) Penny Barg 4–6, 6–2, 7–6^{(7–5)}

- It was Garrison's 2nd title of the year and the 12th of her career. It was Pfaff's 2nd title of the year and the 6th of her career.
