= 1989 Virginia Slims of New England =

- Date: October 30 – November 5
- Edition: 5th
- Category: Category 5
- Draw: 32S / 16D
- Prize money: $300,000
- Surface: Carpet / indoor
- Location: Worcester, MA, United States
- Venue: Centrum in Worcester

Champions

Singles
- (United States) Martina Navratilova

Doubles
- (United States) Martina Navratilova (United States) Pam Shriver
← 1988 ·	Virginia Slims of New England	· 1990 →

The 1989 Virginia Slims of New England was a women's tennis tournament played on indoor carpet courts at the Centrum in Worcester in Worcester, Massachusetts in the United States and was part of the Category 5 tier of events of the 1989 WTA Tour. It was the fifth edition of the tournament and was held from October 30 through November 5, 1989. First-seeded Martina Navratilova won the singles title and earned $60,000.

== Finals ==
=== Singles ===
(United States) Martina Navratilova defeated (United States) Zina Garrison 6–2, 6–3

- It was Navratilova's 8th singles title of the year and the 146th of her career.

=== Doubles ===
(United States) Martina Navratilova / (United States) Pam Shriver defeated (United States) Elise Burgin / (South Africa) Rosalyn Fairbank 6–4, 4–6, 6–4

- It was Navratilova's 6th doubles title of the year and the 149th of her career. It was Shriver's 7th doubles title of the year and the 101st of her career.
