= 1989 Virginia Slims of New England – Singles =

Singles
- 1989 Virginia Slims of New England

Final
- Champion: (United States) Martina Navratilova
- Runner-up: (United States) Zina Garrison
- Score: 6–2, 6–3

Details
- Draw: 32 (2WC)
- Seeds: 8

Events
Singles	Doubles
← 1988 ·	Virginia Slims of New England	· 1990 →

Martina Navratilova successfully defended her title by defeating Zina Garrison 6–2, 6–3 in the final.

== Seeds ==
1. (United States) Martina Navratilova (champion)
2. (Argentina) Gabriela Sabatini (semifinals)
3. (United States) Zina Garrison (final)
4. (Spain) Conchita Martínez (quarterfinals)
5. (United States) Pam Shriver (quarterfinals)
6. (Soviet Union) Natasha Zvereva (first round)
7. (Canada) Helen Kelesi (second round)
8. (South Africa) Rosalyn Fairbank (quarterfinals)

== Draw ==
=== Key ===
- Q = Qualifier
- WC = Wild card
- LL = Lucky loser
- Alt = Alternate
- SE = Special exempt
- PR = Protected ranking
- ITF = ITF entry
- JE = Junior exempt
- w/o = Walkover
- r = Retired
- d = Defaulted
- SR = Special ranking

=== Finals ===
Semifinals
1	(United States) Martina Navratilova	6	6
(United States) Anne Smith	3	2
3	(United States) Zina Garrison	7^{7}	7^{7}
2	(Argentina) Gabriela Sabatini	6^{4}	6^{3}

Final
1	(United States) Martina Navratilova	6	6
3	(United States) Zina Garrison	2	3

=== Top half ===
First round
1	(United States) M Navratilova	6	6
(Netherlands) B Schultz	2	1
WC	(United States) E deLone	6^{6}	0
(United States) A Leand	7^{8}	6
(United States) W White	5	1
(Argentina) F Labat	7	6
(United States) ML Daniels	6	2	3
5	(United States) P Shriver	3	6	6
4	(Spain) C Martínez	6	6
(United States) P Louie Harper	2	0
(United States) A Schwartz	2	4
WC	(West Germany) B Bunge	6	6
(United States) E Burgin	6	6^{1}	1
(United States) A Smith	3	7^{7}	6
(United States) B Bowes	6	2	2
7	(Canada) H Kelesi	2	6	6

Second round
1	(United States) M Navratilova	6	6
(United States) A Leand	2	3
(Argentina) F Labat	3	0
5	(United States) P Shriver	6	6
4	(Spain) C Martínez	7^{7}	7^{7}
WC	(West Germany) B Bunge	6^{3}	6^{5}
(United States) A Smith	6	6
7	(Canada) H Kelesi	4	2

Quarterfinals
1	(United States) M Navratilova	6	6
5	(United States) P Shriver	2	0
4	(Spain) C Martínez	3	6	2
(United States) A Smith	6	3	6

Semifinals
1	(United States) M Navratilova	6	6
(United States) A Smith	3	2

=== Bottom half ===
First round
6	(Soviet Union) N Zvereva	7	2	4
(West Germany) E Pfaff	5	6	6
(Hungary) A Temesvári	2	2
(Australia) E Smylie	6	6
(United States) L Allen	6	3	4
(United States) C Benjamin	3	6	6
(United States) Patty Murren	2	1
3	(United States) Z Garrison	6	6
8	(South Africa) R Fairbank	7	6
(United States) M Werdel	5	1
(South Africa) L Gregory	0	6^{4}
(United States) S Collins	6	7^{7}
(United States) B Potter	2	1
(United States) G Magers	6	6
(United States) C MacGregor	1	1
2	(Argentina) G Sabatini	6	6

Second round
(West Germany) E Pfaff	6	2	3
(Australia) E Smylie	2	6	6
(United States) C Benjamin	1	6^{3}
3	(United States) Z Garrison	6	7^{7}
8	(South Africa) R Fairbank	6	7
(United States) S Collins	4	5
(United States) G Magers	2	1
2	(Argentina) G Sabatini	6	6

Quarterfinals
(Australia) E Smylie	1	6^{4}
3	(United States) Z Garrison	6	7^{7}
8	(South Africa) R Fairbank	4	5
2	(Argentina) G Sabatini	6	7

Semifinals
3	(United States) Z Garrison	7^{7}	7^{7}
2	(Argentina) G Sabatini	6^{4}	6^{3}
