= 1988 Virginia Slims of New England =

- Date: October 31 – November 6
- Edition: 4th
- Category: Category 5
- Draw: 32S / 16D
- Prize money: $300,000
- Surface: Carpet (Supreme) / indoor
- Location: Worcester, MA, United States

Champions

Singles
- (United States) Martina Navratilova

Doubles
- (United States) Martina Navratilova / (United States) Pam Shriver
← 1987 ·	Virginia Slims of New England	· 1989 →

The 1988 Virginia Slims of New England was a women's tennis tournament played on indoor carpet courts in Worcester, Massachusetts in the United States and was part of the Category 5 tier of the 1988 WTA Tour. It was the fourth edition of the tournament and was held from October 31 through November 6, 1988. First-seeded Martina Navratilova won the singles title and earned $60,000 first-prize money.

== Finals ==
=== Singles ===
(United States) Martina Navratilova defeated (Soviet Union) Natasha Zvereva 6–7^{(4–7)}, 6–4, 6–3

- It was Navratilova's 8th singles title of the year and the 137th of her career.

=== Doubles ===
(United States) Martina Navratilova / (United States) Pam Shriver defeated (Argentina) Gabriela Sabatini / (Czechoslovakia) Helena Suková 6–3, 3–6, 7–5

- It was Navratilova's 15th title of the year and the 279th of her career. It was Shriver's 10th title of the year and the 113th of her career.
