= 1989 Bausch & Lomb Championships – Doubles =

Doubles
- 1989 Bausch & Lomb Championships

Final
- Champions: (Soviet Union) Larisa Savchenko; (Soviet Union) Natasha Zvereva
- Runners-up: (United States) Martina Navratilova; (United States) Pam Shriver
- Score: 7–6, 2–6, 6–1

Details
- Draw: 28
- Seeds: 8

Events
| Singles | Doubles |
| ← 1988 · | Amelia Island Championships | · 1990 → |

Zina Garrison and Eva Pfaff were the defending champions but did not compete that year.

Larisa Savchenko and Natasha Zvereva won in the final 7–6, 2–6, 6–1 against Martina Navratilova and Pam Shriver.

== Seeds ==
Champion seeds are indicated in bold text while text in italics indicates the round in which those seeds were eliminated. The top four seeded teams received byes into the second round.

1. (United States) Martina Navratilova / (United States) Pam Shriver (final)
2. (Soviet Union) **Larisa Savchenko** / (Soviet Union) **Natasha Zvereva (champions)**
3. (United States) Katrina Adams / (United States) Lori McNeil (semifinals)
4. (United States) Elise Burgin / (South Africa) Rosalyn Fairbank (second round)
5. (United States) Terry Phelps / (United States) Candy Reynolds (quarterfinals)
6. (United States) Penny Barg / (United States) Ronni Reis (second round)
7. (United States) Tracy Austin / (Australia) Hana Mandlíková (second round)
8. (Italy) Sandra Cecchini / (Socialist Federal Republic of Yugoslavia) Sabrina Goleš (first round)

== Draw ==
=== Key ===
- Q = Qualifier
- WC = Wild card
- LL = Lucky loser
- Alt = Alternate
- SE = Special exempt
- PR = Protected ranking
- ITF = ITF entry
- JE = Junior exempt
- w/o = Walkover
- r = Retired
- d = Defaulted
- SR = Special ranking

=== Final ===
Final

1
- (United States) Martina Navratilova
- (United States) Pam Shriver
6
**6**
1

2
- (Soviet Union) **Larisa Savchenko**
- (Soviet Union) **Natasha Zvereva**
**7**
2
**6**

=== Top half ===
First round

Second round

Quarterfinals

Semifinals

1
- (United States) **M Navratilova**
- (United States) **P Shriver**
**6**
**6**

- (United States) **H Cioffi**
- (United States) **S Stafford**
3
**6**
**6**

- (United States) H Cioffi
- (United States) S Stafford
3
1

- (Argentina) M Paz
- (United States) K Rinaldi
**6**
2
2

1
- (United States) **M Navratilova**
- (United States) **P Shriver**
**6**
**6**

- (Italy) **L Ferrando**
- (Argentina) **P Tarabini**
**6**
**7**

- (Spain) A Sánchez
- (Austria) J Wiesner
1
2

- (United States) B Bowes
- (United States) K Horvath
3
5

- (Italy) L Ferrando
- (Argentina) P Tarabini
2
**6**
1

- (Spain) **A Sánchez**
- (Austria) **J Wiesner**
**6**
**6**

- (Spain) **A Sánchez**
- (Austria) **J Wiesner**
**6**
3
**6**

8
(Italy) S Cecchini
(Socialist Federal Republic of Yugoslavia) S Goleš
4
4

1
- (United States) **M Navratilova**
- (United States) **P Shriver**
**6**
**7**

3
- (United States) K Adams
- (United States) L McNeil
3
5

3
- (United States) **K Adams**
- (United States) **L McNeil**
**6**
5
**6**

- (United States) **E Hakami**
- (South Africa) **K Schimper**
**7**
**6**

- (United States) E Hakami
- (South Africa) K Schimper
1
**7**
0

- (United States) K Foxworth
- (United States) T Whittington
6
2

3
- (United States) **K Adams**
- (United States) **L McNeil**
**7**
**6**

- (Peru) L Gildemeister
- (Netherlands) B Schultz
4
**6**
4

- (Czechoslovakia) P Langrová
- (Czechoslovakia) J Pospíšilová
5
3

- (Czechoslovakia) **P Langrová**
- (Czechoslovakia) **J Pospíšilová**
**6**
4
**6**

- (Czechoslovakia) **P Langrová**
- (Czechoslovakia) **J Pospíšilová**
2
**6**
**6**

- (United States) M Rankine
- (United States) L Zacharias
1
0

6
- (United States) P Barg
- (United States) R Reis
**6**
3
1

6
- (United States) **P Barg**
- (United States) **R Reis**
**6**
**6**

=== Bottom half ===
First round

Second round

Quarterfinals

Semifinals

7
- (United States) **T Austin**
- (Australia) **H Mandlíková**
**6**
**6**

- (Argentina) B Fulco
- (Argentina) A Villagrán
2
2

7
- (United States) T Austin
- (Australia) H Mandlíková
**6**
6
3

- (United States) **J Smoller**
- (Sweden) **M Strandlund**
0
**7**
**6**

- (United States) **J Smoller**
- (Sweden) **M Strandlund**
0
**7**
**6**

- (United States) A Grossman
- (Hungary) A Temesvári
**6**
5
3

- (United States) J Smoller
- (Sweden) M Strandlund
3
**6**
4

- (Argentina) G Mosca
- (Brazil) A Vieira
2
**6**
1

- (United States) **M Norwood**
- (United States) **J Thomas**
**6**
2
**6**

- (United States) **M Norwood**
- (United States) **J Thomas**
**6**
2
**6**

- (United States) **M Norwood**
- (United States) **J Thomas**
**6**
**7**

4
- (United States) E Burgin
- (South Africa) R Fairbank
4
5

- (United States) M Norwood
- (United States) J Thomas
2
1

5
- (United States) **T Phelps**
- (United States) **C Reynolds**
4
**7**
**6**

2
- (Soviet Union) **L Savchenko**
- (Soviet Union) **N Zvereva**
**6**
**6**

- (Czechoslovakia) I Budařová
- (United Kingdom) C Wood
**6**
6
3

5
- (United States) **T Phelps**
- (United States) **C Reynolds**
**6**
3
**6**

- (United States) C Benjamin
- (United States) J Kaplan
5
**6**
3

- (United States) S Collins
- (Soviet Union) L Meskhi
4
**6**
2

- (United States) **S Collins**
- (Soviet Union) **L Meskhi**
**7**
3
**6**

5
- (United States) T Phelps
- (United States) C Reynolds
**6**
1
3

- (West Germany) **I Cueto**
- (United States) **H Na**
**6**
**6**

2
- (Soviet Union) **L Savchenko**
- (Soviet Union) **N Zvereva**
1
**6**
**6**

- (Poland) R Baranski
- (United States) L Spadea
2
1

- (West Germany) I Cueto
- (United States) H Na
5
2

2
- (Soviet Union) **L Savchenko**
- (Soviet Union) **N Zvereva**
**7**
**6**
