= 1988 Bausch & Lomb Championships – Doubles =

Doubles
- 1988 Bausch & Lomb Championships

Final
- Champions: (United States) Zina Garrison (West Germany) Eva Pfaff
- Runners-up: (United States) Katrina Adams (United States) Penny Barg
- Score: 4–6, 6–2, 7–6

Details
- Draw: 28
- Seeds: 8

Events
Singles	Doubles
← 1987 ·	Amelia Island Championships	· 1989 →

Steffi Graf and Gabriela Sabatini were the defending champions but did not compete that year.

Zina Garrison and Eva Pfaff won in the final 4–6, 6–2, 7–6 against Katrina Adams and Penny Barg.

== Seeds ==
Champion seeds are indicated in bold text while text in italics indicates the round in which those seeds were eliminated. The top four seeded teams received byes into the second round.

1. (United States) **Zina Garrison** / (West Germany) **Eva Pfaff (champions)**
2. (Czechoslovakia) Jana Novotná / (France) Catherine Suire (second round)
3. (United States) Gretchen Magers / (United States) Candy Reynolds (second round)
4. (United States) Katrina Adams / (United States) Penny Barg (final)
5. (United States) Mary Lou Daniels / (United States) Anna-Maria Fernandez (first round)
6. (Argentina) Mercedes Paz / (Argentina) Patricia Tarabini (quarterfinals)
7. (United States) Beverly Bowes / (United States) Sandy Collins (second round)
8. (United States) Kathleen Horvath / (South Africa) Dianne Van Rensburg (quarterfinals)

== Draw ==
=== Key ===
- Q = Qualifier
- WC = Wild card
- LL = Lucky loser
- Alt = Alternate
- SE = Special exempt
- PR = Protected ranking
- ITF = ITF entry
- JE = Junior exempt
- w/o = Walkover
- r = Retired
- d = Defaulted
- SR = Special ranking

=== Final ===
Final
1	(United States) **Zina Garrison** (West Germany) **Eva Pfaff**	4	**6**	**7**
4	(United States) Katrina Adams (United States) Penny Barg	**6**	2	6

=== Top half ===
First round
(Czechoslovakia) A Holíková (United States) M Torres	4	**6**	1
(West Germany) **A Betzner** (Austria) **J Wiesner**	**6**	3	**6**
(United States) **E Galphin** (United States) **J Thomas**	**6**	**6**
(United States) D-A Hansel (United States) W Wood	2	4
(United States) **H Cioffi** (United States) **S Stafford**	**7**	**6**
5	(United States) M L Daniels (United States) A M Fernandez	6	1
(United States) **E Hakami** (South Africa) **K Schimper**	**6**	**7**
(Italy) S Cecchini (Socialist Federal Republic of Yugoslavia) S Goleš	3	6
(Canada) J Hetherington (United States) K Rinaldi	3	3
(Argentina) **B Fulco** (United States) **E Raponi-Longo**	**6**	**6**
(United States) D Farrell (United Kingdom) R Viollet	1	0
7	(United States) **B Bowes** (United States) **S Collins**	**6**	**6**

Second round
1	(United States) **Z Garrison** (West Germany) **E Pfaff**	**6**	4	**6**
(West Germany) A Betzner (Austria) J Wiesner	3	**6**	2
(United States) E Galphin (United States) J Thomas	**7**	3	0
(United States) **H Cioffi** (United States) **S Stafford**	6	**6**	**6**
3	(United States) G Magers (United States) C Reynolds	**6**	6	2
(United States) **E Hakami** (South Africa) **K Schimper**	2	**7**	**6**
(Argentina) **B Fulco** (United States) **E Raponi-Longo**	**6**	**6**
7	(United States) B Bowes (United States) S Collins	3	3

Quarterfinals
1	(United States) **Z Garrison** (West Germany) **E Pfaff**	**6**	**6**
(United States) H Cioffi (United States) S Stafford	3	3
(United States) **E Hakami** (South Africa) **K Schimper**	**6**	**6**
(Argentina) B Fulco (United States) E Raponi-Longo	3	3

Semifinals
1	(United States) **Z Garrison** (West Germany) **E Pfaff**	4	**6**	**6**
(United States) E Hakami (South Africa) K Schimper	**6**	1	3

=== Bottom half ===
First round
8	(United States) **K Horvath** (South Africa) **D Van Rensburg**	2	**6**	**6**
(Czechoslovakia) I Budařová (United States) J Kaplan	**6**	0	1
(United States) **M J Fernández** (Canada) **H Kelesi**	**6**	4	**6**
(United States) P Casale (Brazil) T Zambrzycki	2	**6**	1
(Italy) L Garrone (Argentina) G Mosca	3	3
(United States) **C Benjamin** (United States) **H Na**	**6**	**6**
6	(Argentina) **M Paz** (Argentina) **P Tarabini**	6	**6**	**6**
(West Germany) I Cueto (Spain) A Sánchez	**7**	3	3
(Switzerland) **E Krapl** (Belgium) **S Wasserman**	**6**	6	**6**
(United States) K Steinmetz (United States) T Whittington	3	**7**	3
(Sweden) M Lindström (West Germany) W Probst	0	**6**	2
(South Africa) **L Gregory** (United States) **R Reis**	**6**	2	**6**

Second round
8	(United States) **K Horvath** (South Africa) **D van Rensburg**	**6**	4	**6**
(United States) M J Fernández (Canada) H Kelesi	2	**6**	1
(United States) C Benjamin (United States) H Na	**6**	4	4
4	(United States) **K Adams** (United States) **P Barg**	4	**6**	**6**
6	(Argentina) **M Paz** (Argentina) **P Tarabini**	1	**6**	**6**
(Switzerland) E Krapl (Belgium) S Wasserman	**6**	1	4
(South Africa) **L Gregory** (United States) **R Reis**	**7**	**7**
2	(Czechoslovakia) J Novotná (France) C Suire	6	5

Quarterfinals
8	(United States) K Horvath (South Africa) D van Rensburg	6	**6**	2
4	(United States) **K Adams** (United States) **P Barg**	**7**	2	**6**
6	(Argentina) M Paz (Argentina) P Tarabini	4	4
(South Africa) **L Gregory** (United States) **R Reis**	**6**	**6**

Semifinals
4	(United States) **K Adams** (United States) **P Barg**	**6**	**7**
(South Africa) L Gregory (United States) R Reis	4	5
