= 1993 WTA German Open – Doubles =

Doubles
- 1993 WTA German Open

Final
- Champions: (United States) Gigi Fernández; (Belarus) Natasha Zvereva
- Runners-up: (United States) Debbie Graham; (Netherlands) Brenda Schultz
- Score: 6–1, 6–3

Details
- Draw: 28 (2 Q / 2 WC)
- Seeds: 8

Events
Singles	Doubles
- German Open (WTA)

Gigi Fernández and Natasha Zvereva won the title, defeating Debbie Graham and Brenda Schultz in the finals, 6–1, 6–3.

Jana Novotná and Larisa Neiland were the defending champions, but chose not to participate.

== Seeds ==
The top four seeds received a bye to the second round.

1. (United States) Gigi Fernández / (Belarus) Natalia Zvereva (champions)
2. (United States) Lori McNeil / (Australia) Rennae Stubbs (semifinal)
3. (United States) Mary Joe Fernández / (Spain) Conchita Martínez (second round)
4. (Canada) Jill Hetherington / (United States) Kathy Rinaldi (quarterfinal)
5. (United States) Katrina Adams / (Netherlands) Manon Bollegraf (first round)
6. (France) Isabelle Demongeot / (South Africa) Elna Reinach (first round)
7. (Argentina) Inés Gorrochategui / (Czech Republic) Andrea Strnadová (first round)
8. (Argentina) Florencia Labat / (Argentina) Mercedes Paz (second round)

== Draw ==
Key

- Q = Qualifier
- WC = Wild card
- LL = Lucky loser
- Alt = Alternate
- ITF = ITF entry
- PR = Protected ranking
- SR = Special ranking
- SE = Special exempt
- JE = Junior exempt
- JR = Junior Accelerator Programme entrant
- CO = College Accelerator Programme entrant
- NG = Next Gen Accelerator Program entrant
- w/o = Walkover
- r = Retired
- d = Defaulted

=== Finals ===
Semifinals

Final

1
(United States) Gigi Fernández
(Belarus) Natalia Zvereva
6
3
7

- (France) Julie Halard
- (West Germany) Anke Huber
3
6
5

1
(United States) Gigi Fernández
(Belarus) Natalia Zvereva
6
6

- (United States) Debbie Graham
- (Netherlands) Brenda Schultz
1
3

(United States) Debbie Graham
(Netherlands) Brenda Schultz
6
6

2
- (United States) Lori McNeil
- (Australia) Rennae Stubbs
2
1

=== Top half ===
First round

Second round

Quarterfinals

Semifinals

1
(United States) G Fernández
(Belarus) N Zvereva
1
6
6

(Australia) N Provis
(Australia) E Smylie
6
1
6

- (Australia) N Provis
- (Australia) E Smylie
6
3
4

- (United States) S Collins
- (Australia) R McQuillan
3
6
1

1
(United States) G Fernández
(Belarus) N Zvereva
6
6

(Bulgaria) M Maleeva
(Georgia (country)) L Meskhi
6
6

- (France) N Tauziat
- (Austria) J Wiesner
3
3

- (Australia) L Field
- (Italy) L Golarsa
3
3

- (Bulgaria) M Maleeva
- (Georgia (country)) L Meskhi
4
4

(France) N Tauziat
(Austria) J Wiesner
6
6

(France) N Tauziat
(Austria) J Wiesner
6
6

6
- (France) I Demongeot
- (South Africa) E Reinach
2
3

1
(United States) Gigi Fernández
(Belarus) Natalia Zvereva
6
3
7

- (France) Julie Halard
- (West Germany) Anke Huber
1
6
5

4
(Canada) J Hetherington
(United States) K Rinaldi
6
6

(Australia) J Faull
(Australia) K Radford
6
2
7

- (Australia) J Faull
- (Australia) K Radford
3
1

- (United States) Patty O'Reilly
- (Japan) K Date
2
6
5

4
- (Canada) J Hetherington
- (United States) K Rinaldi
6
4

(France) J Halard
(West Germany) A Huber
6
7

(France) J Halard
(West Germany) A Huber
7
6

- (United States) A Grossman
- (Canada) P Hy
1
6

(France) J Halard
(West Germany) A Huber
6
6

- (Australia) L Pleming
- (Slovakia) R Zrubáková
1
5

8
- (Argentina) F Labat
- (Argentina) M Paz
2
2

8
(Argentina) F Labat
(Argentina) M Paz
6
7

=== Bottom half ===
First round

Second round

Quarterfinals

Semifinals

5
- (United States) K Adams
- (Netherlands) M Bollegraf
4
7
6

(Netherlands) M Oremans
(Netherlands) C Vis
6
5
7

- (Netherlands) M Oremans
- (Netherlands) C Vis
5
5

(United States) D Graham
(Netherlands) B Schultz
6
2
6

(United States) D Graham
(Netherlands) B Schultz
7
7

WC
- (Germany) M Babel
- (Germany) E Pfaff
4
6
0

(United States) D Graham
(Netherlands) B Schultz
5
6
6

(Italy) S Cecchini
(Argentina) P Tarabini
6
6

- (Italy) S Cecchini
- (Argentina) P Tarabini
7
4
3

WC
- (Germany) S Frankl
- (Germany) S Meier
3
2

(Italy) S Cecchini
(Argentina) P Tarabini
0

3
- (United States) M Joe Fernández
- (Spain) C Martínez
0^{d}

(United States) Debbie Graham
(Netherlands) Brenda Schultz
6
6

7
- (Argentina) I Gorrochategui
- (Czech Republic) A Strnadová
4
4

2
- (United States) Lori McNeil
- (Australia) Rennae Stubbs
2
1

(United States) S Stafford
(Hungary) A Temesvári
6
6

- (United States) S Stafford
- (Hungary) A Temesvári
7
2
4

- (Brazil) N van Lottum
- (Austria) P Ritter
1
6
2

(United States) J Emmons
(United States) G Helgeson
6
6
6

(United States) J Emmons
(United States) G Helgeson
6
3
6

- (United States) J Emmons
- (United States) G Helgeson
2
2

(Ukraine) E Brioukhovets
(Ukraine) N Medvedeva
6
6

2
(United States) L McNeil
(United States) R Stubbs
6
6

Q
- (United States) C Cunningham
- (Netherlands) S Rottier
1
3

(Ukraine) E Brioukhovets
(Ukraine) N Medvedeva
6
7

2
- (United States) L McNeil
- (Australia) R Stubbs
0
5
