= 1986 Virginia Slims of New England (November) =

- Date: November 3–9
- Edition: 2nd
- Draw: 32S / 28D
- Prize money: $250,000
- Surface: Hard / indoor
- Location: Worcester, MA, United States

Champions

Singles
- (United States) Martina Navratilova

Doubles
- (United States) Martina Navratilova (United States) Pam Shriver
← 1986 ·	Virginia Slims of New England	· 1987 →

The 1986 Virginia Slims of New England (November) was a women's tennis tournament played on indoor hard courts in Worcester, Massachusetts in the United States and was part of the 1986 Virginia Slims World Championship Series. It was the second edition of the tournament and was held from November 3 through November 9, 1986. First-seeded Martina Navratilova won the singles title.

== Finals ==
=== Singles ===
(United States) Martina Navratilova defeated (Czechoslovakia) Hana Mandlíková 6–2, 6–2

- It was Navratilova's 12th singles title of the year and the 123rd of her career.

=== Doubles ===
(United States) Martina Navratilova / (United States) Pam Shriver defeated (West Germany) Claudia Kohde-Kilsch / (Czechoslovakia) Helena Suková 6–3, 6–1

- It was Navratilova's 10th title of the year and the 125th of her career. It was Shriver's 10th title of the year and the 77th of her career.
