= 1986 Virginia Slims of New England (January) =

- Date: January 13–19
- Edition: 1st
- Draw: 56S / 16D
- Prize money: $150,000
- Surface: Carpet / indoor
- Location: Worcester, MA, United States

Champions

Singles
- (United States) Martina Navratilova

Doubles
- (United States) Martina Navratilova (United States) Pam Shriver
Virginia Slims of New England	· 1986 →

The 1986 Virginia Slims of New England (January), also known as the New England Classic, was a women's tennis tournament played on indoor carpet courts in Worcester, Massachusetts in the United States and was part of the 1985 Virginia Slims World Championship Series. It was the inaugural edition of the tournament and was held from January 13 through January 19, 1986. First-seeded Martina Navratilova won the singles title.

== Finals ==
=== Singles ===
(United States) Martina Navratilova defeated (West Germany) Claudia Kohde-Kilsch 4–6, 6–1, 6–4

- It was Navratilova's 2nd singles title of the year and the 113th of her career.

=== Doubles ===
(United States) Martina Navratilova / (United States) Pam Shriver defeated (West Germany) Claudia Kohde-Kilsch / (Czechoslovakia) Helena Suková 6–3, 6–4

- It was Navratilova's 2nd doubles title of the year and the 117th of her career. It was Shriver's 2nd doubles title of the year and the 69th of her career.
