= 1987 Volvo Classic =

- Date: 19–25 October
- Edition: 10th
- Category: Category 4
- Draw: 32S / 16D
- Prize money: $200,000
- Surface: Carpet / indoor
- Location: Brighton, England
- Venue: Brighton Centre

Champions

Singles
- (Argentina) Gabriela Sabatini

Doubles
- (United States) Kathy Jordan / (Czechoslovakia) Helena Suková
- Brighton International

The 1987 Volvo Classic was a women's tennis tournament played on indoor carpet court at the Brighton Centre in Brighton, England that was part of the 1987 Virginia Slims World Championship Series. It was the 10th edition of the tournament and was held from 19 October until 25 October 1987. Second-seeded Gabriela Sabatini won the singles title and earned $40,000 first-prize money.

== Finals ==
=== Singles ===
(Argentina) Gabriela Sabatini defeated (United States) Pam Shriver 7–5, 6–4

- It was Sabatini's 2nd singles title of the year and the 4th of her career.

=== Doubles ===
(United States) Kathy Jordan / (Czechoslovakia) Helena Suková defeated (Denmark) Tine Scheuer-Larsen / (France) Catherine Tanvier 7–5, 6–1
