= 1989 Bausch & Lomb Championships =

- Date: April 10 – 16
- Edition: 10th
- Category: Category 5
- Draw: 56S / 28D
- Prize money: $300,000
- Surface: Clay / outdoor
- Location: Amelia Island, Florida, U.S
- Venue: Amelia Island Plantation

Champions

Singles
- (Argentina) Gabriela Sabatini

Doubles
- (Soviet Union) Larisa Savchenko (Soviet Union) Natasha Zvereva
← 1988 ·	Amelia Island Championships	· 1990 →

The 1989 Bausch & Lomb Championships was a women's tennis tournament played on outdoor clay courts at the Amelia Island Plantation on Amelia Island, Florida in the United States that was part of the Category 5 tier of the 1989 WTA Tour. The tournament was held from April 10 through April 16, 1989. Third-seeded Gabriela Sabatini won the singles title.

== Finals ==
=== Singles ===
(Argentina) Gabriela Sabatini defeated (West Germany) Steffi Graf 3–6, 6–3, 7–5

- It was Sabatini's 2nd title of the year and the 20th of her career.

=== Doubles ===
(Soviet Union) Larisa Savchenko / (Soviet Union) Natasha Zvereva defeated (United States) Martina Navratilova / (United States) Pam Shriver 7–6^{(7–4)}, 2–6, 6–1

- It was Savchenko's 1st title of the year and the 11th of her career. It was Zvereva's 1st title of the year and the 3rd of her career.
