= 1987 WITA Championships – Singles =

Singles
- 1987 WITA Championships

Final
- Champion: (West Germany) Steffi Graf
- Runner-up: (Czechoslovakia) Hana Mandlíková
- Score: 6–3, 6–4

Details
- Draw: 56 (8Q/4LL)
- Seeds: 14

Events
Singles	Doubles
- Amelia Island Championships

Steffi Graf successfully defended her title by defeating Hana Mandlíková 6–3, 6–4 in the final.

== Seeds ==
The top eight seeds received a bye to the second round.

1. (West Germany) Steffi Graf (champion)
2. (Czechoslovakia) Hana Mandlíková (final)
3. (United States) Zina Garrison (semifinals)
4. (West Germany) Claudia Kohde-Kilsch (third round)
5. (Argentina) Gabriela Sabatini (semifinals)
6. (United States) Kathy Rinaldi (quarterfinals)
7. (Bulgaria) Manuela Maleeva (quarterfinals)
8. (n/a)
9. (United States) Lori McNeil (third round)
10. (United States) Stephanie Rehe (second round)
11. (Italy) Raffaella Reggi (third round)
12. (United States) Mary Joe Fernández (third round)
13. (n/a)
14. (South Africa) Rosalyn Fairbank (third round)

== Draw ==
Key

- Q = Qualifier
- WC = Wild card
- LL = Lucky loser
- Alt = Alternate
- ITF = ITF entry
- PR = Protected ranking
- SR = Special ranking
- SE = Special exempt
- JE = Junior exempt
- JR = Junior Accelerator Programme entrant
- CO = College Accelerator Programme entrant
- NG = Next Gen Accelerator Program entrant
- w/o = Walkover
- r = Retired
- d = Defaulted

=== Finals ===
Quarterfinals
1	(West Germany) Steffi Graf	6	6
7	(Bulgaria) Manuela Maleeva	1	0
(Canada) Helen Kelesi	4	6	2
5	(Argentina) Gabriela Sabatini	6	4	6
6	(United States) Kathy Rinaldi	4	4
3	(United States) Zina Garrison	6	6
(United States) Terry Phelps	6	2
2	(Czechoslovakia) Hana Mandlíková	7	6

Semifinals
1	(West Germany) Steffi Graf	6	6
5	(Argentina) Gabriela Sabatini	2	2
3	(United States) Zina Garrison	3	3
2	(Czechoslovakia) Hana Mandlíková	6	6

Final
1	(West Germany) Steffi Graf	6	6
2	(Czechoslovakia) Hana Mandlíková	3	4

=== Top half ===
==== Section 1 ====
First round
(United States) V Nelson-Dunbar	6	2	6
(United States) S Sloane	3	6	1
Q	(Argentina) B Fulco	6	6
(United States) C Reynolds	2	1
(Brazil) P Medrado	3	7	2
10	(United States) S Rehe	6	6	6
(United States) D Spence	1	1^{r}
(United States) T Mochizuki	6	4
Q	(Czechoslovakia) J Novotná	6	6	1
(Czechoslovakia) R Maršíková	2	7	6
(West Germany) E Pfaff	1	2
Q	(Netherlands) H ter Riet	6	6

Second round
1	(West Germany) S Graf	6	6
(United States) V Nelson-Dunbar	2	2
Q	(Argentina) B Fulco	6	6
10	(United States) S Rehe	2	3
(United States) T Mochizuki	7	1	5
(Czechoslovakia) R Maršíková	6	6	7
Q	(Netherlands) H ter Riet	6	1	1
7	(Bulgaria) M Maleeva	1	6	6

Third round
1	(West Germany) S Graf	6	6
Q	(Argentina) B Fulco	0	1
(Czechoslovakia) R Maršíková	4	0
7	(Bulgaria) M Maleeva	6	6

Quarterfinals
1	(West Germany) S Graf	6	6
7	(Bulgaria) M Maleeva	1	0

==== Section 2 ====
First round
Q	(United States) H Cioffi	0	6	6
Q	(Italy) F Bonsignori	6	4	3
Q	(United States) Caryn Moss	4	2
(Austria) P Huber	6	6
(Canada) H Kelesi	7	6
(Peru) L Gildemeister	5	3
12	(United States) MJ Fernández	5	6	6
(France) N Herreman	7	4	2
LL	(Netherlands) M Bollegraf	2	6
(Argentina) M Paz	6	7
(South Africa) Y Vermaak	3	3
(Spain) A Sánchez Vicario	6	6

Second round
4	(West Germany) C Kohde-Kilsch	6	6
Q	(United States) H Cioffi	4	1
(Austria) P Huber	6	3	1
(Canada) H Kelesi	3	6	6
12	(United States) MJ Fernández	6	6
(Argentina) M Paz	4	1
(Spain) A Sánchez Vicario	0	2
5	(Argentina) G Sabatini	6	6

Third round
4	(West Germany) C Kohde-Kilsch	3	4
(Canada) H Kelesi	6	6
12	(United States) MJ Fernández	1	4
5	(Argentina) G Sabatini	6	6

Quarterfinals
(Canada) H Kelesi	4	6	2
5	(Argentina) G Sabatini	6	4	6

=== Bottom half ===
==== Section 3 ====
First round
(South Africa) E Reinach	3	0
(United States) E Hakami	6	6
(United States) K Horvath	3	6	3
Q	(West Germany) W Probst	6	2	6
(Argentina) M Pérez Roldán	4	1
9	(United States) L McNeil	6	6
(United States) E Burgin	2	2
(Italy) S Cecchini	6	6
(United States) C Benjamin	5	6	1
(Canada) C Bassett	7	3	6
LL	(United States) C Fernandez	6	6
LL	(Argentina) P Tarabini	4	4

Second round
6	(United States) K Rinaldi	4	7	6
(United States) E Hakami	6	6	2
Q	(West Germany) W Probst	3	0
9	(United States) L McNeil	6	6
(Italy) S Cecchini	6	4	4
(Canada) C Bassett	4	6	6
LL	(United States) C Fernandez	1	1
3	(United States) Z Garrison	6	6

Third round
6	(United States) K Rinaldi	6	6
9	(United States) L McNeil	3	1
(Canada) C Bassett	1	5
3	(United States) Z Garrison	6	7

Quarterfinals
6	(United States) K Rinaldi	4	4
3	(United States) Z Garrison	6	6

==== Section 4 ====
First round
(Netherlands) M Mesker	6	7
Q	(United States) J Klitch	1	6
(Socialist Federal Republic of Yugoslavia) S Goleš	2	7	3
(Greece) A Kanellopoulou	6	6	6
(United States) T Phelps	6	6
11	(Italy) R Reggi	3	2
14	(South Africa) R Fairbank	6	6
(France) MC Calleja	1	2
(United States) M Torres	6	6
(West Germany) S Meier	2	3
(West Germany) I Cueto	7	7
(United States) Le Allen	5	5

Second round
LL	(United Kingdom) M Javer	6	6
(Netherlands) M Mesker	3	3
(Greece) A Kanellopoulou	2	0
(United States) T Phelps	6	6
14	(South Africa) R Fairbank	6	6
(United States) M Torres	0	4
(West Germany) I Cueto	4	1
2	(Czechoslovakia) H Mandlíková	6	6

Third round
LL	(United Kingdom) M Javer	3	2
(United States) T Phelps	6	6
14	(South Africa) R Fairbank	2	4
2	(Czechoslovakia) H Mandlíková	6	6

Quarterfinals
(United States) T Phelps	6	2
2	(Czechoslovakia) H Mandlíková	7	6
