= 1987 WITA Championships – Doubles =

Doubles
- 1987 WITA Championships

Final
- Champions: (West Germany) Steffi Graf (Argentina) Gabriela Sabatini
- Runners-up: (Czechoslovakia) Hana Mandlíková (Australia) Wendy Turnbull
- Score: 3–6, 6–3, 7–5

Details
- Draw: 28
- Seeds: 8

Events
Singles	Doubles
- Amelia Island Championships

Claudia Kohde-Kilsch and Helena Suková were the defending champions, but none competed this year. Kohde-Kilsch participated in the singles tournament only, losing in the third round against Helen Kelesi.

Steffi Graf and Gabriela Sabatini won the title by defeating Hana Mandlíková and Wendy Turnbull 3–6, 6–3, 7–5 in the final.

== Seeds ==
The top four seeds received a bye to the second round.

1. (West Germany) Steffi Graf / (Argentina) Gabriela Sabatini (champions)
2. (Czechoslovakia) Hana Mandlíková / (Australia) Wendy Turnbull (final)
3. (United States) Elise Burgin / (South Africa) Rosalyn Fairbank (quarterfinals)
4. (n/a)
5. (United States) Zina Garrison / (United States) Lori McNeil (second round)
6. (Peru) Laura Gildemeister / (United States) Candy Reynolds (semifinals)
7. (Argentina) Mercedes Paz / (West Germany) Eva Pfaff (quarterfinals)
8. (Italy) Sandra Cecchini / (Socialist Federal Republic of Yugoslavia) Sabrina Goleš (second round)

== Draw ==
Key

- Q = Qualifier
- WC = Wild card
- LL = Lucky loser
- Alt = Alternate
- ITF = ITF entry
- PR = Protected ranking
- SR = Special ranking
- SE = Special exempt
- JE = Junior exempt
- JR = Junior Accelerator Programme entrant
- CO = College Accelerator Programme entrant
- NG = Next Gen Accelerator Program entrant
- w/o = Walkover
- r = Retired
- d = Defaulted

=== Finals ===
Semifinals
1	(West Germany) Steffi Graf (Argentina) Gabriela Sabatini	6	6
(Czechoslovakia) Jana Novotná (France) Catherine Suire	4	4
6	(Peru) Laura Gildemeister (United States) Candy Reynolds	6	3	5
2	(Czechoslovakia) Hana Mandlíková (Australia) Wendy Turnbull	3	6	7

Final
1	(West Germany) Steffi Graf (Argentina) Gabriela Sabatini	3	6	7
2	(Czechoslovakia) Hana Mandlíková (Australia) Wendy Turnbull	6	3	5

=== Top half ===
First round
(France) N Herreman (Austria) P Huber	2	6	5
(United States) C Benjamin (United States) D Hansel	6	1	7
(Brazil) P Medrado (United States) P Smith	6	7
(Argentina) G Mosca (United States) V Nelson-Dunbar	4	5
(United States) Shelley Aguero (United Kingdom) R Viollet	0	2
7	(Argentina) M Paz (West Germany) E Pfaff	6	6
(Italy) F Bonsignori (Netherlands) H ter Riet	7	6
(United States) D Farrell (United States) S Rimes	6	2
(United States) T Mochizuki (United States) S Sloane	1	4
(Czechoslovakia) J Novotná (France) C Suire	6	6
(Netherlands) M Bollegraf (United States) J Kaplan	1	6	1
5	(United States) Z Garrison (United States) L McNeil	6	3	6

Second round
1	(West Germany) S Graf (Argentina) G Sabatini	6	6
(United States) C Benjamin (United States) D Hansel	3	1
(Brazil) P Medrado (United States) P Smith	2	2
7	(Argentina) M Paz (West Germany) E Pfaff	6	6
(United States) E Hakami (United States) J Klitch	6	6
(Italy) F Bonsignori (Netherlands) H ter Riet	1	2
(Czechoslovakia) J Novotná (France) C Suire	3	6	6
5	(United States) Z Garrison (United States) L McNeil	6	1	4

Quarterfinals
1	(West Germany) S Graf (Argentina) G Sabatini	6	6	7
7	(Argentina) M Paz (West Germany) E Pfaff	4	7	6
(United States) E Hakami (United States) J Klitch	6	1	1
(Czechoslovakia) J Novotná (France) C Suire	4	6	6

Semifinals
1	(West Germany) S Graf (Argentina) G Sabatini	6	6
(Czechoslovakia) J Novotná (France) C Suire	4	4

=== Bottom half ===
First round
6	(Peru) L Gildemeister (United States) C Reynolds	7	6
(Argentina) M Pérez Roldán (Argentina) P Tarabini	5	2
(United States) K Horvath (Netherlands) M Mesker	2	6	3
(Argentina) B Fulco (Czechoslovakia) A Holíková	6	3	6
(West Germany) I Cueto (Spain) A Sánchez Vicario	6	7
(Canada) C Bassett (United States) S Rehe	3	5
8	(Italy) S Cecchini (Socialist Federal Republic of Yugoslavia) S Goleš	7	6	1
(United States) A Holton (South Africa) Y Vermaak	6	7	3^{r}
(United States) AM Fernandez (Canada) H Kelesi	6	6
(United States) T Phelps (Italy) R Reggi	3	0
(Czechoslovakia) R Maršíková (West Germany) S Meier	4	7	7
(United States) Le Allen (United States) K Copeland	6	6	5

Second round
6	(Peru) L Gildemeister (United States) C Reynolds	6	6
(Argentina) B Fulco (Czechoslovakia) A Holíková	4	3
(West Germany) I Cueto (Spain) A Sánchez Vicario	5	3
3	(United States) E Burgin (South Africa) R Fairbank	7	6
8	(Italy) S Cecchini (Socialist Federal Republic of Yugoslavia) S Goleš	0	3
(United States) AM Fernandez (Canada) H Kelesi	6	6
(Czechoslovakia) R Maršíková (West Germany) S Meier	1	5
2	(Czechoslovakia) H Mandlíková (Australia) W Turnbull	6	7

Quarterfinals
6	(Peru) L Gildemeister (United States) C Reynolds	2	6	7
3	(United States) E Burgin (South Africa) R Fairbank	6	1	6
(United States) AM Fernandez (Canada) H Kelesi	0	6	1
2	(Czechoslovakia) H Mandlíková (Australia) W Turnbull	6	4	6

Semifinals
6	(Peru) L Gildemeister (United States) C Reynolds	6	3	5
2	(Czechoslovakia) H Mandlíková (Australia) W Turnbull	3	6	7
