= 1993 WTA German Open – Singles =

Singles
- 1993 WTA German Open

Final
- Champion: (Germany) Steffi Graf
- Runner-up: (Argentina) Gabriela Sabatini
- Score: 7–6^{(7–3)}, 2–6, 6–4

Details
- Draw: 56 (8 Q / 3 WC)
- Seeds: 16

Events
Singles	Doubles
- WTA German Open

Steffi Graf was the two-time defending champion and successfully defended her title, defeating Gabriela Sabatini in the final, 7–6^{(7–3)}, 2–6, 6–4.

== Seeds ==
The top eight seeds received a bye to the second round.

1. (Germany) Steffi Graf (champion)
2. (Argentina) Gabriela Sabatini (final)
3. (United States) Mary Joe Fernández (semifinal)
4. (United States) Jennifer Capriati (third round)
5. (Spain) Conchita Martínez (semifinal)
6. (Bulgaria) Magdalena Maleeva (quarterfinal)
7. (Germany) Anke Huber (quarterfinal)
8. (France) Nathalie Tauziat (quarterfinal)
9. (Japan) Kimiko Date (first round)
10. (Germany) Sabine Hack (third round)
11. (United States) Lori McNeil (first round)
12. (Belarus) Natalia Zvereva (second round)
13. (Austria) Judith Wiesner (third round)
14. (Georgia (country)) Leila Meskhi (second round)
15. (France) Julie Halard (first round)
16. (Italy) Sandra Cecchini (third round)

== Draw ==
Key

- Q = Qualifier
- WC = Wild card
- LL = Lucky loser
- Alt = Alternate
- ITF = ITF entry
- PR = Protected ranking
- SR = Special ranking
- SE = Special exempt
- JE = Junior exempt
- JR = Junior Accelerator Programme entrant
- CO = College Accelerator Programme entrant
- NG = Next Gen Accelerator Program entrant
- w/o = Walkover
- r = Retired
- d = Defaulted

=== Finals ===
Quarterfinals
1	(Germany) Steffi Graf	6	6
6	(Bulgaria) Magdalena Maleeva	2	3
3	(United States) Mary Joe Fernández	6	6
8	(France) Nathalie Tauziat	2	3
5	(Spain) Conchita Martínez	6	6
(Netherlands) Brenda Schultz	1	0
7	(Germany) Anke Huber	6	2
2	(Argentina) Gabriela Sabatini	7	6

Semifinals
1	(Germany) Steffi Graf	4	6	6
3	(United States) Mary Joe Fernández	6	4	3
5	(Spain) Conchita Martínez	3	6	5
2	(Argentina) Gabriela Sabatini	6	4	7

Final
1	(Germany) Steffi Graf	7	2	6
2	(Argentina) Gabriela Sabatini	6	6	4

=== Top half ===
==== Section 1 ====
First round
(South Africa) E Reinach	0	6
(Argentina) F Labat	6	7
(Germany) M Živec-Škulj	6	3	3
Q	(United States) K Adams	2	6	6
(Canada) P Hy	2	0
10	(Germany) S Hack	6	6
11	(United States) L McNeil	4	3
(United States) G Helgeson	6	6
(United States) C Cunningham	5	6	1
Q	(Bulgaria) E Pampoulova	7	4	6
(Slovakia) R Zrubáková	6	7
(Hungary) A Temesvári	0	6

Second round
1	(Germany) S Graf	6	6
(Argentina) F Labat	0	2
Q	(United States) K Adams	0	0
10	(Germany) S Hack	6	6
(United States) G Helgeson	6	6
Q	(Bulgaria) E Pampoulova	0	2
(Slovakia) R Zrubáková	0	4
6	(Bulgaria) M Maleeva	6	6

Third round
1	(Germany) S Graf	0	6	6
10	(Germany) S Hack	6	3	2
(United States) G Helgeson	5	1
6	(Bulgaria) M Maleeva	7	6

Quarterfinals
1	(Germany) Steffi Graf	6	6
6	(Bulgaria) Magdalena Maleeva	2	3

==== Section 2 ====
First round
(France) I Demongeot	0	6	7
(Netherlands) M Bollegraf	6	3	6
Q	(Austria) P Ritter	6	4	6
(Australia) R McQuillan	2	6	2
Q	(Finland) P Thorén	2	1
13	(Austria) J Wiesner	6	6
15	(France) J Halard	2	2
(Netherlands) M Oremans	6	6
Q	(Canada) R Simpson-Alter	2	2
Q	(Argentina) M Gaidano	6	6
Q	(Paraguay) R de los Ríos	6	6
Q	(Japan) A Kijimuta	3	4

Second round
3	(United States) M Joe Fernández	6	6
(France) I Demongeot	0	3
Q	(Austria) P Ritter	6	6	4
13	(Austria) J Wiesner	3	7	6
(Netherlands) M Oremans	6	4	3
Q	(Argentina) M Gaidano	4	6	6
Q	(Paraguay) R de los Ríos	1	2
8	(France) N Tauziat	6	6

Third round
3	(United States) M Joe Fernández	6	7
13	(Austria) J Wiesner	2	6
Q	(Argentina) M Gaidano	5	3
8	(France) N Tauziat	7	6

Quarterfinals
3	(United States) Mary Joe Fernández	6	6
8	(France) Nathalie Tauziat	2	3

=== Bottom half ===
==== Section 1 ====
First round
(Argentina) I Gorrochategui	6	7	1
(France) A Fusai	7	5	6
(Argentina) P Tarabini	2	6	2^{r}
(Germany) M Babel	6	4	3
(Germany) S Meier	4	4
14	(Georgia (country)) L Meskhi	6	6
9	(Japan) K Date	4	2
(Netherlands) B Schultz	6	6
WC	(Germany) H Rusch	6	6
(Italy) F Bonsignori	3	4
(Germany) W Probst	6	6
(Germany) K Kschwendt	2	1

Second round
5	(Spain) C Martínez	6	6
(France) A Fusai	1	3
(Germany) M Babel	6	6
14	(Georgia (country)) L Meskhi	4	4
(Netherlands) B Schultz	6	6
WC	(Germany) H Rusch	1	0
(Germany) W Probst	2	6	0
4	(United States) J Capriati	6	4	6

Third round
5	(Spain) C Martínez	6	6
(Germany) M Babel	1	3
(Netherlands) B Schultz	6	5	6
4	(United States) J Capriati	2	7	4

Quarterfinals
5	(Spain) Conchita Martínez	6	6
(Netherlands) Brenda Schultz	1	0

==== Section 2 ====
First round
(Germany) S Frankl	2	3
(Australia) N Provis	6	6
(Netherlands) S Rottier	4	4
(United States) A Grossman	6	6
(Czech Republic) A Strnadová	4	3
12	(Belarus) N Zvereva	6	6
16	(Italy) S Cecchini	6	6
WC	(Germany) P Begerow	3	2
(United States) S Stafford	6	4	6
(Argentina) B Fulco-Villella	4	6	4
WC	(Germany) M Kochta	6	6
(Ukraine) N Medvedeva	1	3

Second round
7	(Germany) A Huber	7	6
(Australia) N Provis	6	3
(United States) A Grossman	7	6
12	(Belarus) N Zvereva	5	0
16	(Italy) S Cecchini	3	6	6
(United States) S Stafford	6	1	3
WC	(Germany) M Kochta	1	0
2	(Argentina) G Sabatini	6	6

Third round
7	(Germany) A Huber	5	6	6
(United States) A Grossman	7	1	3
16	(Italy) S Cecchini	0	2
2	(Argentina) G Sabatini	6	6

Quarterfinals
7	(Germany) Anke Huber	6	1
2	(Argentina) Gabriela Sabatini	7	6
