= 1988 Bausch & Lomb Championships – Singles =

Singles
- 1988 Bausch & Lomb Championships

Final
- Champion: (United States) Martina Navratilova
- Runner-up: (Argentina) Gabriela Sabatini
- Score: 6–0, 6–2

Events
Singles	Doubles
← 1987 ·	Bausch & Lomb Championships	· 1989 →

Steffi Graf was the defending champion but lost in the semifinals to Gabriela Sabatini.

Martina Navratilova won in the final 6–0, 6–2 against Sabatini.

== Seeds ==
A champion seed is indicated in bold text while text in italics indicates the round in which that seed was eliminated. The top eight seeds received a bye to the second round.

1. (West Germany) Steffi Graf (semifinals)
2. (United States) **Martina Navratilova (champion)**
3. (Argentina) Gabriela Sabatini (final)
4. (West Germany) Claudia Kohde-Kilsch (semifinals)
5. (United States) Zina Garrison (quarterfinals)
6. (Bulgaria) Katerina Maleeva (quarterfinals)
7. (United States) Mary Joe Fernández (second round)
8. n/a
9. (Italy) Sandra Cecchini (third round)
10. (West Germany) Isabel Cueto (first round)
11. (Czechoslovakia) Jana Novotná (second round)
12. (Austria) Judith Wiesner (second round)
13. (Canada) Helen Kelesi (third round)
14. (Argentina) Bettina Fulco (first round)
15. n/a
16. n/a

== Draw ==
=== Key ===
- Q = Qualifier
- WC = Wild card
- LL = Lucky loser
- Alt = Alternate
- SE = Special exempt
- PR = Protected ranking
- ITF = ITF entry
- JE = Junior exempt
- w/o = Walkover
- r = Retired
- d = Defaulted
- SR = Special ranking

=== Finals ===
Semifinals
1	(West Germany) Steffi Graf	3	**6**	5
3	(Argentina) **Gabriela Sabatini**	**6**	4	**7**
4	(West Germany) Claudia Kohde-Kilsch	3	2
2	(United States) **Martina Navratilova**	**6**	**6**

Final
3	(Argentina) Gabriela Sabatini	0	2
2	(United States) **Martina Navratilova**	**6**	**6**

=== Top half ===
==== Section 1 ====
First round
(United States) M Gurney	**6**	4	6
Q	(Peru) **P Vásquez**	4	**6**	**7**
Q	(United States) **D Faber**	**6**	**6**
(Canada) J Hetherington	3	2
(Switzerland) E Krapl	3	0
12	(Austria) **J Wiesner**	**6**	**6**
13	(Canada) **H Kelesi**	**7**	**6**
(Argentina) M Paz	5	4
(United States) **G Magers**	**6**	**7**
(Austria) P Huber	1	5
(United States) **T Phelps**	**6**	2	**7**
Q	(United States) E Galphin	1	**6**	5

Second round
1	(West Germany) **S Graf**	**6**	**6**
Q	(Peru) P Vásquez	1	0
Q	(United States) **D Faber**	**6**	4	**6**
12	(Austria) J Wiesner	3	**6**	3
13	(Canada) **H Kelesi**	**6**	**6**
(United States) G Magers	4	3
(United States) T Phelps	0	1
6	(Bulgaria) **K Maleeva**	**6**	**6**

Third round
1	(West Germany) **S Graf**	**6**	**6**
Q	(United States) D Faber	1	1
13	(Canada) H Kelesi	0	6
6	(Bulgaria) **K Maleeva**	**6**	**7**

Quarterfinals
1	(West Germany) **S Graf**	**6**	**6**
6	(Bulgaria) K Maleeva	2	0

==== Section 2 ====
First round
(United States) **B Bowes**	**6**	3	**6**
(United States) P Casale	2	**6**	3
(United States) **M L Daniels**	4	**6**	**7**
(West Germany) W Probst	**6**	4	5
(Spain) **A Sánchez**	**6**	**6**
10	(West Germany) I Cueto	2	2
(United States) **M Torres**	**6**	3	**6**
(Sweden) M Lindström	4	**6**	0
(West Germany) E Pfaff	6	5
(Italy) **F Bonsignori**	**7**	**7**
Q	(United States) P Barg	**6**	4	3
Q	(Czechoslovakia) **A Holíková**	3	**6**	**6**

Second round
3	(Argentina) **G Sabatini**	**6**	**6**
(United States) B Bowes	4	3
(United States) M L Daniels	2	1
(Spain) **A Sánchez**	**6**	**6**
(United States) **M Torres**	**7**	**6**
(Italy) F Bonsignori	6	0
Q	(Czechoslovakia) A Holíková	3	1
LL	(Greece) **A Kanellopoulou**	**6**	**6**

Third round
3	(Argentina) **G Sabatini**	**7**	**6**
(Spain) A Sánchez	5	3
(United States) **M Torres**	**7**	**7**
LL	(Greece) A Kanellopoulou	5	5

Quarterfinals
3	(Argentina) **G Sabatini**	**6**	**6**
(United States) M Torres	1	1

=== Bottom half ===
==== Section 3 ====
First round
(United States) **H Cioffi**	**6**	**6**
(Argentina) P Tarabini	2	3
(Italy) **L Garrone**	**7**	**6**
Q	(Italy) L Lapi	5	3
(United States) E Hakami	2	2
11	(Czechoslovakia) **J Novotná**	**6**	**6**
(South Africa) **K Schimper**	**6**	**6**
(France) C Suire	3	0
(Belgium) S Wasserman	**6**	3	4
(Poland) **I Kuczyńska**	4	**6**	**6**
(United States) **C Benjamin**	**7**	**6**
(United States) K Keil	5	1

Second round
5	(United States) **Z Garrison**	**6**	3	**6**
(United States) H Cioffi	1	**6**	3
(Italy) **L Garrone**	**7**	**6**
11	(Czechoslovakia) J Novotná	6	0
(South Africa) **K Schimper**	2	**7**	**6**
(Poland) I Kuczyńska	**6**	6	3
(United States) C Benjamin	2	2
4	(West Germany) **C Kohde-Kilsch**	**6**	**6**

Third round
5	(United States) **Z Garrison**	3	**6**	**6**
(Italy) L Garrone	**6**	4	3
(South Africa) K Schimper	2	2
4	(West Germany) **C Kohde-Kilsch**	**6**	**6**

Quarterfinals
5	(United States) Z Garrison	3	2
4	(West Germany) **C Kohde-Kilsch**	**6**	**6**

==== Section 4 ====
First round
Q	(United States) A Schwartz	3	2
(United States) **K Horvath**	**6**	**6**
(Argentina) **A Villagrán**	**6**	2	**6**
Q	(United States) K Adams	3	**6**	1
(Czechoslovakia) **I Budařová**	**7**	**6**
14	(Argentina) B Fulco	6	4
9	(Italy) **S Cecchini**	**6**	**6**
(United States) R Reis	3	2
(United States) C Reynolds	3	1
(United States) **S Stafford**	**6**	**6**
(South Africa) D Van Rensburg	**6**	1	5
(Socialist Federal Republic of Yugoslavia) **S Goleš**	3	**6**	**7**

Second round
7	(United States) M J Fernández	6	3
(United States) **K Horvath**	**7**	**6**
(Argentina) **A Villagrán**	**6**	**6**
(Czechoslovakia) I Budařová	2	3
9	(Italy) **S Cecchini**	**6**	**6**
(United States) S Stafford	2	1
(Socialist Federal Republic of Yugoslavia) S Goleš	3	3
2	(United States) **M Navratilova**	**6**	**6**

Third round
(United States) **K Horvath**	**6**	**6**
(Argentina) A Villagrán	3	2
9	(Italy) S Cecchini	0	3
2	(United States) **M Navratilova**	**6**	**6**

Quarterfinals
(United States) K Horvath	3	1
2	(United States) **M Navratilova**	**6**	**6**
