= 1987 Virginia Slims of New England =

- Date: November 2–8
- Edition: 3rd
- Category: Category 4
- Draw: 32S / 16D
- Prize money: $250,000
- Surface: Carpet / indoor
- Location: Worcester, MA, United States

Champions

Singles
- (United States) Pam Shriver

Doubles
- (United States) Elise Burgin (South Africa) Rosalyn Fairbank
| ← 1986 · | Virginia Slims of New England | · 1988 → |

The 1987 Virginia Slims of New England was a women's tennis tournament played on indoor carpet courts in Worcester, Massachusetts in the United States and was part of the Category 4 tier of the 1987 WTA Tour. It was the third edition of the tournament and was held from November 2 through November 8, 1987. Second-seeded Pam Shriver won the singles title.

== Finals ==
=== Singles ===
(United States) Pam Shriver defeated (United States) Chris Evert 6–4, 4–6, 6–0

- It was Shriver's 4th title of the year and the 17th of her career.

=== Doubles ===
(United States) Elise Burgin / (South Africa) Rosalyn Fairbank defeated (West Germany) Bettina Bunge / (West Germany) Eva Pfaff 6–4, 6–4

- It was Burgin's 2nd title of the year and the 18th of her career. It was Fairbank's 1st title of the year and the 14th of her career.
