= 1989 Bausch & Lomb Championships – Singles =

Singles
- 1989 Bausch & Lomb Championships

Final
- Champion: (Argentina) Gabriela Sabatini
- Runner-up: (West Germany) Steffi Graf
- Score: 3–6, 6–3, 7–5

Details
- Draw: 56 (7 Q )
- Seeds: 16

Events
Singles	Doubles
← 1988 ·	Amelia Island Championships	· 1990 →

Martina Navratilova was the defending champion but lost in the semifinals to Gabriela Sabatini.

Sabatini won in the final 3–6, 6–3, 7–5 against Steffi Graf.

== Seeds ==
A champion seed is indicated in bold text while text in italics indicates the round in which that seed was eliminated. The top eight seeds received a bye to the second round.

1. (West Germany) Steffi Graf (final)
2. (United States) Martina Navratilova (semifinals)
3. (Argentina) **Gabriela Sabatini (champion)**
4. (Soviet Union) Natasha Zvereva (second round)
5. (United States) Lori McNeil (second round)
6. (Spain) Arantxa Sánchez (semifinals)
7. (Soviet Union) Larisa Savchenko (second round)
8. (Australia) Hana Mandlíková (quarterfinals)
9. (Italy) Sandra Cecchini (second round)
10. (Argentina) Bettina Fulco (second round)
11. (Austria) Judith Wiesner (quarterfinals)
12. (United States) Terry Phelps (second round)
13. (West Germany) Isabel Cueto (second round)
14. (Soviet Union) Leila Meskhi (third round)
15. n/a
16. n/a

== Draw ==
=== Key ===
- Q = Qualifier
- WC = Wild card
- LL = Lucky loser
- Alt = Alternate
- SE = Special exempt
- PR = Protected ranking
- ITF = ITF entry
- JE = Junior exempt
- w/o = Walkover
- r = Retired
- d = Defaulted
- SR = Special ranking

=== Finals ===
Semifinals
1	(West Germany) **Steffi Graf**	**6**	**6**
6	(Spain) Arantxa Sánchez	3	2
3	(Argentina) **Gabriela Sabatini**	**6**	**6**
2	(United States) Martina Navratilova	3	2

Final
1	(West Germany) Steffi Graf	**6**	3	5
3	(Argentina) **Gabriela Sabatini**	3	**6**	**7**

=== Top half ===
==== Section 1 ====
First round
(United States) K Adams	1	5
(United States) **E Burgin**	**6**	**7**
(Italy) **L Lapi**	**6**	**7**
Q	(United States) P Barg	1	5
(United States) H Cioffi	**6**	0	2
9	(Italy) **S Cecchini**	4	**6**	**6**
(South Africa) R Fairbank	5	6
(United Kingdom) **S Gomer**	**7**	**7**
(United States) K Gompert	4	4
(South Africa) **K Schimper**	**6**	**6**
(United States) **E Hakami**	3	**6**	**6**
(Argentina) P Tarabini	**6**	2	2

Second round
1	(West Germany) **S Graf**	**6**	**6**
(United States) E Burgin	1	2
(Italy) **L Lapi**	3	**6**	**6**
9	(Italy) S Cecchini	**6**	3	1
(United Kingdom) S Gomer	5	3
(South Africa) **K Schimper**	**7**	**6**
(United States) E Hakami	4	2
8	(Australia) **H Mandlíková**	**6**	**6**

Third round
1	(West Germany) **S Graf**	**6**	**6**
(Italy) L Lapi	1	0
(South Africa) K Schimper	5	6
8	(Australia) **H Mandlíková**	**7**	**7**

Quarterfinals
1	(West Germany) **S Graf**	**6**	**6**
8	(Australia) H Mandlíková	3	4

==== Section 2 ====
First round
Q	(United States) K Kessaris	4	2
Q	(Czechoslovakia) **R Rajchrtová**	**6**	**6**
(Czechoslovakia) I Budařová	5	2
Q	(Italy) **C Caverzasio**	**7**	**6**
(Socialist Federal Republic of Yugoslavia) S Goleš	**6**	4	5
11	(Austria) **J Wiesner**	4	**6**	**7**
13	(West Germany) **I Cueto**	**6**	**6**
Q	(West Germany) S Frankl	2	1
(United States) **A Grossman**	**6**	**6**
(United States) K Horvath	1	1
(United States) C Benjamin	1	**6**	1
(United States) **S Stafford**	**6**	1	**6**

Second round
4	(Soviet Union) N Zvereva	**6**	3	3
Q	(Czechoslovakia) **R Rajchrtová**	3	**6**	**6**
Q	(Italy) C Caverzasio	3	0
11	(Austria) **J Wiesner**	**6**	**6**
13	(West Germany) I Cueto	6	6
(United States) **A Grossman**	**7**	**7**
(United States) S Stafford	2	4
6	(Spain) **A Sánchez**	**6**	**6**

Third round
Q	(Czechoslovakia) R Rajchrtová	**6**	3	0
11	(Austria) **J Wiesner**	4	**6**	**6**
(United States) A Grossman	0	1
6	(Spain) **A Sánchez**	**6**	**6**

Quarterfinals
11	(Austria) J Wiesner	4	5
6	(Spain) **A Sánchez**	**6**	**7**

=== Bottom half ===
==== Section 3 ====
First round
(Greece) **A Kanellopoulou**	**6**	**6**
(United States) C Reynolds	2	2
(Sweden) M Strandlund	3	**6**	1
Q	(Hungary) **A Temesvári**	**6**	1	**6**
Q	(Poland) R Baranski	1	2
12	(United States) **T Phelps**	**6**	**6**
10	(Argentina) **B Fulco**	**6**	**6**
(Italy) L Garrone	3	2
(Czechoslovakia) **J Pospíšilová**	4	**6**	**6**
(United States) A Farley	**6**	3	0
(Argentina) **M Paz**	**7**	**6**
Q	(Czechoslovakia) A Holíková	6	0

Second round
7	(Soviet Union) L Savchenko	4	**6**	1
(Greece) **A Kanellopoulou**	**6**	2	**6**
Q	(Hungary) **A Temesvári**	**6**	4	**7**
12	(United States) T Phelps	2	**6**	6
10	(Argentina) B Fulco	4	**6**	2
(Czechoslovakia) **J Pospíšilová**	**6**	4	**6**
(Argentina) M Paz	3	**6**	2
3	(Argentina) **G Sabatini**	**6**	4	**6**

Third round
(Greece) **A Kanellopoulou**	**7**	**6**
Q	(Hungary) A Temesvári	6	3
(Czechoslovakia) J Pospíšilová	3	3
3	(Argentina) **G Sabatini**	**6**	**6**

Quarterfinals
(Greece) A Kanellopoulou	**6**	4	3
3	(Argentina) **G Sabatini**	3	**6**	**6**

==== Section 4 ====
First round
(United States) R Reis	2	2
(United States) **K Rinaldi**	**6**	**6**
(Peru) **L Gildemeister**	**6**	**6**
LL	(France) J Halard	0	3
(United States) H Na	2	6
14	(Soviet Union) **L Meskhi**	**6**	**7**
(Netherlands) B Schultz	**7**	2	2
(Italy) **L Ferrando**	6	**6**	**6**
(Czechoslovakia) **P Langrová**	**6**	0	**7**
(United States) B Bowes	4	**6**	5
(United States) **M Torres**	**6**	**6**
(United States) D Faber	4	3

Second round
5	(United States) L McNeil	1	3
(United States) **K Rinaldi**	**6**	**6**
(Peru) L Gildemeister	**6**	2	5
14	(Soviet Union) **L Meskhi**	3	**6**	**7**
(Italy) **L Ferrando**	6	**6**	**7**
(Czechoslovakia) P Langrová	**7**	2	6
(United States) M Torres	2	0
2	(United States) **M Navratilova**	**6**	**6**

Third round
(United States) **K Rinaldi**	3	**6**	**6**
14	(Soviet Union) L Meskhi	**6**	2	3
(Italy) L Ferrando	1	1
2	(United States) **M Navratilova**	**6**	**6**

Quarterfinals
(United States) K Rinaldi	1	4
2	(United States) **M Navratilova**	**6**	**6**
