= 1993 WTA German Open =

- Date: 10–16 May
- Edition: 82nd
- Category: Tier I
- Draw: 56S / 28D
- Prize money: $750,000
- Surface: Clay / outdoor
- Location: Berlin. Germany
- Venue: Rot-Weiss Tennis Club

Champions

Singles
- (Germany) Steffi Graf

Doubles
- (United States) Gigi Fernández / (Belarus) Natasha Zvereva
- WTA German Open

The 1993 WTA German Open was a women's tennis tournament played on outdoor clay courts at the Rot-Weiss Tennis Club in Berlin, Germany that was part of the Tier I category of the 1993 WTA Tour. It was the 82nd edition of the tournament and was held from 10 May until 16 May 1993. First-seeded Steffi Graf won the singles title, her seventh at the event, and earned $150,000 first-prize money as well as 470 ranking points.

== Finals ==
=== Singles ===
(Germany) Steffi Graf defeated (Argentina) Gabriela Sabatini 7–6^{(7–3)}, 2–6, 6–4

- It was Graf's 3rd singles title of the year and the 72nd of her career.

=== Doubles ===
(United States) Gigi Fernández / (Belarus) Natasha Zvereva defeated (United States) Debbie Graham / (Netherlands) Brenda Schultz 6–1, 6–3

== Prize money ==
Event	W	F	SF	QF	Round of 16	Round of 32	Round of 64
Singles	$150,000	$60,000	$30,000	$15,000	$7,725	$4,125	$2,250
