= 1988 Virginia Slims of New England – Doubles =

Doubles
- 1988 Virginia Slims of New England
- 1987 Champions: (United States) Elise Burgin (South Africa) Rosalyn Fairbank

Final
- Champions: (United States) Martina Navratilova (United States) Pam Shriver
- Runners-up: (Argentina) Gabriela Sabatini (Czechoslovakia) Helena Suková
- Score: 6–3, 3–6, 7–5

Events
Singles	Doubles
← 1987 ·	Virginia Slims of New England	· 1989 →

Elise Burgin and Rosalyn Fairbank were the defending champions but only Fairbank competed that year with Wendy Turnbull.

Fairbank and Turnbull lost in the quarterfinals to Jenny Byrne and Janine Tremelling.

Martina Navratilova and Pam Shriver won in the final 6–3, 3–6, 7–5 against Gabriela Sabatini and Helena Suková.

== Seeds ==
Champion seeds are indicated in bold text while text in italics indicates the round in which those seeds were eliminated.

1. (United States) **Martina Navratilova** / (United States) **Pam Shriver (champions)**
2. (Argentina) Gabriela Sabatini / (Czechoslovakia) Helena Suková (final)
3. (Soviet Union) Larisa Savchenko / (Soviet Union) Natasha Zvereva (semifinals)
4. (South Africa) Rosalyn Fairbank / (Australia) Wendy Turnbull (quarterfinals)

== Draw ==
=== Key ===
- Q = Qualifier
- WC = Wild card
- LL = Lucky loser
- Alt = Alternate
- SE = Special exempt
- PR = Protected ranking
- ITF = ITF entry
- JE = Junior exempt
- w/o = Walkover
- r = Retired
- d = Defaulted
- SR = Special ranking

First round
1	(United States) **M Navratilova** (United States) **P Shriver**	**6**	**6**
(United States) R Casals (United States) S Collins	3	1
(United States) **C Benjamin** (United States) **Ca MacGregor**	**6**	**7**
(United States) A Henricksson (United States) Cy MacGregor	3	6
3	(Soviet Union) **L Savchenko** (Soviet Union) **N Zvereva**	5	**7**	**6**
(United States) G Magers (United States) W White	**7**	5	2
(United States) **T Austin** (United States) **S Rehe**	**6**	**6**
(United States) H Na (South Africa) K Schimper	2	2
(Canada) C Bassett-Seguso (United States) K Rinaldi	1	3
(Australia) **J Byrne** (Australia) **J Tremelling**	**6**	**6**
(United States) L Allen (Poland) I Kuczyńska	2	**6**	1
4	(South Africa) **R Fairbank** (Australia) **W Turnbull**	**6**	4	**6**
(Canada) **H Kelesi** (United States) **H Ludloff**	**6**	**6**
(United States) L Bartlett (South Africa) M de Swardt	1	1
(South Africa) L Gregory (United States) R Reis	3	4
2	(Argentina) **G Sabatini** (Czechoslovakia) **H Suková**	**6**	**6**

Quarterfinals
1	(United States) **M Navratilova** (United States) **P Shriver**	**6**	**6**
(United States) C Benjamin (United States) Ca MacGregor	4	1
3	(Soviet Union) **L Savchenko** (Soviet Union) **N Zvereva**	**7**	**6**
(United States) T Austin (United States) S Rehe	6	3
(Australia) **J Byrne** (Australia) **J Tremelling**	**7**	**6**
4	(South Africa) R Fairbank (Australia) W Turnbull	6	4
(Canada) H Kelesi (United States) H Ludloff	2	3
2	(Argentina) **G Sabatini** (Czechoslovakia) **H Suková**	**6**	**6**

Semifinals
1	(United States) **M Navratilova** (United States) **P Shriver**	**6**	**6**
3	(Soviet Union) L Savchenko (Soviet Union) N Zvereva	2	3
(Australia) J Byrne (Australia) J Tremelling	2	3
2	(Argentina) **G Sabatini** (Czechoslovakia) **H Suková**	**6**	**6**

Final
1	(United States) **Martina Navratilova** (United States) **Pam Shriver**	**6**	3	**7**
2	(Argentina) Gabriela Sabatini (Czechoslovakia) Helena Suková	3	**6**	5
