= 1988 Virginia Slims of New England – Singles =

Singles
- 1988 Virginia Slims of New England
- 1987 Champion: (United States) Chris Evert

Final
- Champion: (United States) Martina Navratilova
- Runner-up: (Soviet Union) Natasha Zvereva
- Score: 6–7, 6–4, 6–3

Events
Singles	Doubles
- Virginia Slims of New England

The 1988 Virginia Slims of New England Women's single tennis tournament was won by Martina Navratilova. Pam Shriver was the defending champion but lost in the second round.

Navratilova won in the final 6–7, 6–4, 6–3 against Zvereva.

== Seeds ==
A champion seed is indicated in bold text while text in italics indicates the round in which that seed was eliminated.

1. (United States) **Martina Navratilova (champion)**
2. (United States) Chris Evert (semifinals)
3. (Argentina) Gabriela Sabatini (semifinals)
4. (United States) Pam Shriver (second round)
5. (Czechoslovakia) Helena Suková (quarterfinals)
6. (Soviet Union) Natasha Zvereva (final)
7. (United States) Barbara Potter (quarterfinals)
8. (Soviet Union) Larisa Savchenko (second round)

== Draw ==
Key

- Q = Qualifier
- WC = Wild card
- LL = Lucky loser
- Alt = Alternate
- ITF = ITF entry
- PR = Protected ranking
- SR = Special ranking
- SE = Special exempt
- JE = Junior exempt
- JR = Junior Accelerator Programme entrant
- CO = College Accelerator Programme entrant
- NG = Next Gen Accelerator Program entrant
- w/o = Walkover
- r = Retired
- d = Defaulted

First round
1	(United States) **M Navratilova**	**6**	**6**
(South Africa) K Schimper	3	0
(Canada) C Bassett-Seguso	**6**	3	5
(United States) **S Sloane**	1	**6**	**7**
(United States) **M L Daniels**	4	**6**	**6**
(United States) C Benjamin	**6**	3	2
(United States) E Burgin	6	4
5	(Czechoslovakia) **H Suková**	**7**	**6**
3	(Argentina) **G Sabatini**	**6**	**7**
(United States) R Reis	1	5
(United States) **A Henricksson**	**6**	**6**
(United States) P Louie-Harper	2	4
(South Africa) R Fairbank	4	**6**	2
(Canada) **H Kelesi**	**6**	4	**6**
(Australia) W Turnbull	**6**	0	1
8	(Soviet Union) **L Savchenko**	4	**6**	**6**
6	(Soviet Union) **N Zvereva**	**6**	**6**
(United States) H Na	3	4
(Poland) **I Kuczyńska**	2	**6**	**6**
Q	(Australia) J Tremelling	**6**	2	2
(United States) **S Rehe**	**7**	**6**
Q	(United States) M Van Nostrand	5	1
(Soviet Union) L Meskhi	1	2
4	(United States) **P Shriver**	**6**	**6**
7	(United States) **B Potter**	**7**	6	**6**
(United States) M McGrath	6	**7**	2
LL	(South Africa) M de Swardt	4	5
(United States) **W White**	**6**	**7**
(United States) **G Magers**	**7**	6	**6**
Q	(Australia) J Byrne	5	**7**	4
Q	(United States) S Stafford	3	5
2	(United States) **C Evert**	**6**	**7**

Second round
1	(United States) **M Navratilova**	**6**	**6**
(United States) S Sloane	1	2
(United States) M L Daniels	2	**6**	1
5	(Czechoslovakia) **H Suková**	**6**	4	**6**
3	(Argentina) **G Sabatini**	**6**	**7**
(United States) A Henricksson	1	5
(Canada) **H Kelesi**	**7**	**6**
8	(Soviet Union) L Savchenko	6	0
6	(Soviet Union) **N Zvereva**	**6**	**6**
(Poland) I Kuczyńska	4	3
(United States) **S Rehe**	1	**7**	**7**
4	(United States) P Shriver	**6**	6	5
7	(United States) **B Potter**	**6**	**6**
(United States) W White	4	2
(United States) G Magers	5	**6**	6
2	(United States) **C Evert**	**7**	1	**7**

Quarterfinals
1	(United States) **M Navratilova**	**6**	**6**
6	(Czechoslovakia) H Suková	1	2
3	(Argentina) **G Sabatini**	**7**	**6**
(Canada) H Kelesi	5	4
6	(Soviet Union) **N Zvereva**	**7**	**6**
(United States) S Rehe	5	2
7	(United States) B Potter	**6**	5	2
2	(United States) **C Evert**	4	**7**	**6**

Semifinals
1	(United States) **M Navratilova**	**7**	**6**
3	(Argentina) G Sabatini	5	3
6	(Soviet Union) **N Zvereva**	**7**	**7**
2	(United States) C Evert	5	6

Final
1	(United States) **Martina Navratilova**	6	**6**	**6**
6	(Soviet Union) Natasha Zvereva	**7**	4	3
