= 1987 WITA Championships =

- Date: April 13–19
- Edition: 8th
- Draw: 56S / 28D
- Prize money: $275,000
- Surface: Clay / outdoor
- Location: Amelia Island, Florida, U.S
- Venue: Amelia Island Plantation

Champions

Singles
- (West Germany) Steffi Graf

Doubles
- (West Germany) Steffi Graf (Argentina) Gabriela Sabatini
- Amelia Island Championships

The 1987 Women's International Tennis Association (WITA) Championships, also known as the Bausch & Lomb / WITA Championships, was a women's tennis tournament played on outdoor clay courts at the Amelia Island Plantation on Amelia Island, Florida in the United States that was part of the 1987 WTA Tour. It was the eighth edition of the tournament and was held from April 13 through April 19, 1987. First-seeded Steffi Graf won the singles title and earned $40,000 first-prize money.

== Finals ==
=== Singles ===
(West Germany) Steffi Graf defeated (Czechoslovakia) Hana Mandlíková 6–3, 6–4

- It was Graf's 4th singles title of the year and the 12th of her career.

=== Doubles ===
(West Germany) Steffi Graf / (Argentina) Gabriela Sabatini defeated (Czechoslovakia) Hana Mandlíková / (Australia) Wendy Turnbull 3–6, 6–3, 7–5

- It was Graf's 1st title of the year and the 6th of her career. It was Sabatini's 1st title of the year and the 7th of her career.
