= 1990 Virginia Slims of New England =

- Date: November 5–11
- Edition: 6th
- Category: Tier II
- Draw: 28S / 16D
- Prize money: $350,000
- Surface: Carpet / indoor
- Location: Worcester, MA, United States

Champions

Singles
- (Germany) Steffi Graf

Doubles
- (United States) Gigi Fernández (Czechoslovakia) Helena Suková
← 1989 ·	Virginia Slims of New England

The 1990 Virginia Slims of New England was a women's tennis tournament played on indoor carpet courts in Worcester, Massachusetts in the United States and was part of the Tier II of the 1990 WTA Tour. It was the sixth and final edition of the tournament and was held from November 5 through November 11, 1990. First-seeded Steffi Graf won the singles title.

== Finals ==
=== Singles ===
(Germany) Steffi Graf defeated (Argentina) Gabriela Sabatini 7–6^{(7–5)}, 6–3

- It was Graf's 10th singles title of the year and the 54th of her career.

=== Doubles ===
(United States) Gigi Fernández / (Czechoslovakia) Helena Suková defeated (United States) Mary Joe Fernández / (Czechoslovakia) Jana Novotná 3–6, 6–3, 6–3

- It was Fernández' 5th doubles title of the year and the 18th of her career. It was Suková's 12th doubles title of the year and the 41st of her career.
