= Virginia Slims of New England =

Defunct tennis tournament
- Event name: Virginia Slims of New England
- Tour: WTA Tour
- Founded: 1986
- Abolished: 1990
- Editions: 6
- Location: Worcester, MA, U.S.
- Surface: Carpet (indoors)

The Virginia Slims of New England is a defunct WTA Tour affiliated women's tennis tournament played from 1986 to 1990. It was held in Worcester, Massachusetts in the United States and played on indoor carpet courts.

Martina Navratilova was the most successful player at the tournament, winning the singles and doubles competitions four times each, partnering American Pam Shriver for her doubles successes.

== Results ==
=== Singles ===
Year	Champions	Runners-up	Score
↓ Uncategorized ↓
1986^{(Jan)}	(United States) Martina Navratilova	(West Germany) Claudia Kohde-Kilsch	4–6, 6–1, 6–4
1986^{(Nov)}	(United States) Martina Navratilova (2)	(Czechoslovakia) Hana Mandlíková	6–2, 6–2
↓ Category 4 ↓
1987	(United States) Pam Shriver	(United States) Chris Evert	6–4, 4–6, 6–0
↓ Category 5 ↓
1988	(United States) Martina Navratilova (3)	(Soviet Union) Natasha Zvereva	6–7, 6–4, 6–3
1989	(United States) Martina Navratilova (4)	(United States) Zina Garrison	6–2, 6–3
↓ Tier II ↓
1990	(Germany) Steffi Graf	(Argentina) Gabriela Sabatini	7–6, 6–3

=== Doubles ===
Year	Champions	Runners-up	Score
1986^{(Jan)}	(United States) Martina Navratilova (United States) Pam Shriver	(West Germany) Claudia Kohde-Kilsch (Czechoslovakia) Helena Suková	6–3, 6–4
1986^{(Nov)}	(United States) Martina Navratilova (United States) Pam Shriver	(West Germany) Claudia Kohde-Kilsch (Czechoslovakia) Helena Suková	6–3, 6–1
1987	(United States) Elise Burgin (South Africa) Rosalyn Fairbank	(West Germany) Bettina Bunge (West Germany) Eva Pfaff	6–4, 6–4
1988	(United States) Martina Navratilova (United States) Pam Shriver	(Argentina) Gabriela Sabatini (Czechoslovakia) Helena Suková	6–3, 3–6, 7–5
1989	(United States) Martina Navratilova (United States) Pam Shriver	(United States) Elise Burgin (South Africa) Rosalyn Fairbank	6–4, 4–6, 6–4
1990	(United States) Gigi Fernández (Czechoslovakia) Helena Suková	(United States) Mary Joe Fernández (Czechoslovakia) Jana Novotná	3–6, 6–3, 6–3
