= Penny Barg =

American tennis player

- Full name: Penny Barg-Mager
- Country (sports): United States
- Born: April 11, 1964 (age 62)
- Prize money: US$ 200,921

Singles
- Career record: 111–108
- Career titles: 0
- Highest ranking: No. 104 (November 23, 1987)

Grand Slam singles results
- Australian Open: 1R (1988)
- French Open: 2R (1985)
- Wimbledon: 1R (1986, 1988)
- US Open: 1R (1986)

Doubles
- Career record: 135–137
- Career titles: 3
- Highest ranking: No. 25 (March 13, 1989)

Grand Slam doubles results
- Australian Open: 3R (1988)
- French Open: QF (1985)
- Wimbledon: 2R (1986, 1987, 1989, 1990)
- US Open: QF (1982)

Penny Barg (born April 11, 1964) is a retired tennis player from the U.S. She is also known as Penny Barg-Mager.

== Tennis career ==
During her career Penny Barg, a former champion of the Orange Bowl Junior Singles, won three WTA doubles titles. She also reached the doubles quarterfinals at Wimbledon and the US Open with her partner Beth Herr.

== Career finals ==
=== Doubles (3 titles, 5 runner-ups) ===
Result	W-L	Date	Tournament	Surface	Partner	Opponents	Score
Loss	0–1	Jul 1984	Rio de Janeiro, Brazil	Hard	(United States) Kyle Copeland	(Canada) Jill Hetherington (Canada) Hélène Pelletier	3–6, 6–2, 6–7^{(7–9)}
Loss	0–2	May 1985	Barcelona, Spain	Clay	(Argentina) Adriana Villagrán	(Switzerland) Petra Jauch-Delhees (Brazil) Pat Medrado	1–6, 0–6
Loss	0–3	Jul 1985	Indianapolis, US	Clay	(United States) Paula Smith	(Bulgaria) Katerina Maleeva (Bulgaria) Manuela Maleeva	6–3, 3–6, 6–4
Loss	0–4	Oct 1985	Indianapolis, US	Hard	(United States) Sandy Collins	(United States) Bonnie Gadusek (United States) Mary-Lou Daniels	1–6, 0–6
Win	1–4	Mar 1987	Phoenix, U.S.	Hard	(United States) Beth Herr	(United States) Mary-Lou Piatek (United States) Anne White	2–6, 6–2, 7–6^{(7–2)}
Win	2–4	Aug 1987	Båstad, Sweden	Clay	(Denmark) Tine Scheuer-Larsen	(Italy) Sandra Cecchini (Argentina) Patricia Tarabini	6–1, 6–2
Loss	2–5	Apr 1988	Amelia Island, US	Clay	(United States) Katrina Adams	(United States) Zina Garrison (West Germany) Eva Pfaff	6–4, 2–6, 6–7^{(5–7)}
Win	3–5	Oct 1989	Phoenix, U.S.	Hard	(United States) Peanut Louie Harper	(United States) Elise Burgin (South Africa) Rosalyn Fairbank	7–6^{(16–14)}, 7–6^{(7–3)}

Sporting positions
Preceded by (United States) Susan Mascarin	Orange Bowl Girls' Singles Champion; Category: 18 and under 1981	Succeeded by (Canada) Carling Bassett
