= 1999 Bausch & Lomb Championships =

- Date: April 5–11
- Edition: 20th
- Category: Tier II
- Prize money: $520,000
- Surface: Clay / outdoor
- Location: Amelia Island, Florida, U.S.
- Venue: Amelia Island Plantation

Champions

Singles
- (United States) Monica Seles

Doubles
- (Spain) Conchita Martínez (Argentina) Patricia Tarabini
← 1998 ·	Amelia Island Championships	· 2000 →

The 1999 Bausch & Lomb Championships was a women's tennis tournament played on outdoor clay courts at the Amelia Island Plantation on Amelia Island, Florida in the United States that was part of Tier II of the 1999 WTA Tour. It was the 20th edition of the tournament and was held from April 5 through April 11, 1999. Second-seeded Monica Seles won the singles title.

== Finals ==
=== Singles ===
(United States) Monica Seles defeated (Romania) Ruxandra Dragomir, 6–2, 6–3

=== Doubles ===
(Spain) Conchita Martínez / (Argentina) Patricia Tarabini defeated (United States) Lisa Raymond / (Australia) Rennae Stubbs, 7–5, 0–6, 6–4

== Entrants ==
=== Seeds ===
Country	Player	Rank	Seed
USA	Lindsay Davenport	2	1
USA	Monica Seles	4	2
USA	Venus Williams	6	3
FRA	Mary Pierce	8	4
RSA	Amanda Coetzer	13	5
SUI	Patty Schnyder	10	6
ESP	Conchita Martínez	17	7
AUT	Barbara Schett	19	8
RUS	Anna Kournikova	16	9
USA	Chanda Rubin	24	10
ESP	Magüi Serna	26	11
USA	Lisa Raymond	30	13
ESP	Virginia Ruano Pascual	31	14
FRA	Nathalie Dechy	29	15
CRO	Iva Majoli	32	16
USA	Corina Morariu	35	17

=== Other entrants ===
The following players received wildcards into the singles main draw:

- (Argentina) Inés Gorrochategui
- (South Africa) Jessica Steck
- (United States) Meilen Tu

The following players received entry from the singles qualifying draw:

- (Slovenia) Tina Pisnik
- (Federal Republic of Yugoslavia) Sandra Načuk
- (Canada) Jana Nejedly
- (Canada) Sonya Jeyaseelan
- (Argentina) María José Gaidano
- (Russia) Nadia Petrova
- (Paraguay) Larissa Schaerer
- (Switzerland) Emmanuelle Gagliardi

The following players received entry as a lucky loser:

- (Russia) Evgenia Kulikovskaya
- (United States) Alexandra Stevenson
