= 2002 Bausch & Lomb Championships =

- Date: April 8–14
- Edition: 23rd
- Category: Tier II
- Draw: 56S / 16D
- Prize money: $585,000
- Surface: Clay / outdoor
- Location: Amelia Island, Florida, U.S.
- Venue: Amelia Island Plantation

Champions

Singles
- (United States) Venus Williams

Doubles
- (Slovakia) Daniela Hantuchová (Spain) Arantxa Sánchez Vicario
← 2001 ·	Amelia Island Championships	· 2003 →

The 2002 Bausch & Lomb Championships was a women's tennis tournament played on outdoor clay courts at the Amelia Island Plantation on Amelia Island, Florida in the United States that was part of Tier II of the 2002 WTA Tour. It was the 23rd edition of the tournament and was held from April 8 through April 14, 2002. Venus Williams won the singles title and earned $93,000 first-prize money.

== Finals ==
=== Singles ===
(United States) Venus Williams defeated (Belgium) Justine Henin 2–6, 7–5, 7–6^{(7–5)}

- It was Williams' 3rd title of the year and the 25th of her career.

=== Doubles ===
(Slovakia) Daniela Hantuchová / (Spain) Arantxa Sánchez Vicario defeated (Argentina) María Emilia Salerni / (Sweden) Åsa Svensson 6–4, 6–2

- It was Hantuchová's 1st title of the year and the 3rd of her career. It was Sánchez Vicario's 2nd title of the year and the 64th of her career.
