= 2000 Bausch & Lomb Championships – Singles =

Singles
- 2000 Bausch & Lomb Championships

Final
- Champion: (United States) Monica Seles
- Runner-up: (Spain) Conchita Martínez
- Score: 6–3, 6–2

Details
- Draw: 56 (8 Q / 3 WC )
- Seeds: 8

Events
Singles	Doubles
← 1999 ·	Amelia Island Championships	· 2001 →

Monica Seles was the defending champion and successfully defender her title by defeating Conchita Martínez 6–3, 6–2 in the final.

The tournament was delayed several days due to bad weather. Players were forced to play two matches on a single day in order to complete the tournament. Third round and quarterfinals were played on Saturday – the semifinals and final were played on Sunday.

== Seeds ==
The first eight seeds received a bye into the second round.

1. (France) Mary Pierce (quarterfinals)
2. (United States) Serena Williams (second round, retired due to a left knee tendinitis)
3. (United States) Monica Seles (champion)
4. (Spain) Conchita Martínez (final)
5. (France) Sandrine Testud (second round)
6. (Spain) Arantxa Sánchez Vicario (quarterfinals)
7. (Russia) Anna Kournikova (quarterfinals)
8. (Austria) Barbara Schett (quarterfinals)
9. (United States) Amy Frazier (first round)
10. (South Africa) Amanda Coetzer (third round)
11. (Japan) Ai Sugiyama (second round)
12. (Russia) Elena Likhovtseva (semifinal)
13. (Romania) Ruxandra Dragomir (first round)
14. (Croatia) Silvija Talaja (third round)
15. (United States) Chanda Rubin (third round)
16. (United States) Lisa Raymond (second round)

== Draw ==
Key

- Q = Qualifier
- WC = Wild card
- LL = Lucky loser
- Alt = Alternate
- ITF = ITF entry
- PR = Protected ranking
- SR = Special ranking
- SE = Special exempt
- JE = Junior exempt
- JR = Junior Accelerator Programme entrant
- CO = College Accelerator Programme entrant
- NG = Next Gen Accelerator Program entrant
- w/o = Walkover
- r = Retired
- d = Defaulted

=== Finals ===
Quarterfinals
1	(France) Mary Pierce	6	4	4
12	(Russia) Elena Likhovtseva	2	6	6
4	(Spain) Conchita Martínez	6	6
8	(Austria) Barbara Schett	4	3
6	(Spain) Arantxa Sánchez Vicario	1	3
3	(United States) Monica Seles	6	6
7	(Russia) Anna Kournikova	6	2	4
(Argentina) Paola Suárez	2	6	6

Semifinals
12	(Russia) Elena Likhovtseva	3	2
4	(Spain) Conchita Martínez	6	6
3	(United States) Monica Seles	6	6
(Argentina) Paola Suárez	3	2

Final
4	(Spain) Conchita Martínez	3	2
3	(United States) Monica Seles	6	6

=== Top half ===
==== Section 1 ====
First round
Q	(United States) T Singian	6	6
WC	(United States) L Osterloh	1	3
Q	(Bulgaria) P Nola	3	2
(United States) A Stevenson	6	6
Q	(United States) L Wild	3	1
14	(Croatia) S Talaja	6	6
12	(Russia) E Likhovtseva	7^{9}	6
(South Africa) J Kruger	6^{7}	2
(Slovakia) H Nagyová	6	6
(Slovenia) T Pisnik	0	2
(Russia) N Petrova	5	6	2
(Switzerland) P Schnyder	7	4	6

Second round
1	(France) M Pierce	6	6
Q	(United States) T Singian	1	3
(United States) A Stevenson	6	2	2
14	(Croatia) S Talaja	4	6	6
12	(Russia) E Likhovtseva	6	3
(Slovakia) H Nagyová	2	0^{r}
(Switzerland) P Schnyder	7^{7}	7^{7}
5	(France) S Testud	6^{4}	6^{0}

Third round
1	(France) M Pierce	6	7
14	(Croatia) S Talaja	4	5
12	(Russia) E Likhovtseva	6	7^{7}
(Switzerland) P Schnyder	3	6^{4}

Quarterfinals
1	(France) M Pierce	6	4	4
12	(Russia) E Likhovtseva	2	6	6

==== Section 2 ====
First round
Q	(United States) H Parkinson	1	4
(Russia) E Dementieva	6	6
Q	(Russia) A Jidkova	4	3
(Australia) J Dokic	6	6
(Italy) R Grande	6	6^{1}	7^{7}
9	(United States) A Frazier	2	7^{7}	6^{5}
15	(United States) C Rubin	7	6
(Canada) M Drake	5	3
(United States) E deLone	4	1
(Russia) A Myskina	6	6
(Spain) G León García	6	6
(Canada) J Nejedly	1	1

Second round
4	(Spain) C Martínez	7	6
(Russia) E Dementieva	5	2
(Australia) J Dokic	6	6
(Italy) R Grande	2	3
15	(United States) C Rubin	6	3	6
(Russia) A Myskina	1	6	4
(Spain) G León García	2	2
8	(Austria) B Schett	6	6

Third round
4	(Spain) C Martínez	6	6
(Australia) J Dokic	1	4
15	(United States) C Rubin	0	2
8	(Austria) B Schett	6	6

Quarterfinals
4	(Spain) C Martínez	6	6
8	(Austria) B Schett	4	3

=== Bottom half ===
==== Section 3 ====
First round
WC	(United States) T Snyder	1	6	6
(United States) K Brandi	6	4	4
(Germany) A Glass	5	1
(Spain) M Serna	7	6
(Russia) T Panova	0	4
10	(South Africa) A Coetzer	6	6
13	(Romania) R Dragomir	6	4	5
(Sweden) Å Carlsson	4	6	7
(Switzerland) E Gagliardi	4	4
(United States) C Morariu	6	6
(Israel) A Smashnova	6	6
WC	(Croatia) I Majoli	3	1

Second round
6	(Spain) A Sánchez Vicario	6	0	6
WC	(United States) T Snyder	4	6	4
(Spain) M Serna	4	4
10	(South Africa) A Coetzer	6	6
(Sweden) Å Carlsson	2	4
(United States) C Morariu	6	6
(Israel) A Smashnova	6^{0}	0
3	(United States) M Seles	7^{7}	6

Third round
6	(Spain) A Sánchez Vicario	6	6
10	(South Africa) A Coetzer	2	4
(United States) C Morariu	3	1
3	(United States) M Seles	6	6

Quarterfinals
6	(Spain) A Sánchez Vicario	1	3
3	(United States) M Seles	6	6

==== Section 4 ====
First round
(Croatia) M Lučić	1	3
(Luxembourg) A Kremer	6	6
(Colombia) F Zuluaga	4	6^{3}
(Australia) N Pratt	6	7^{7}
(Romania) I Spîrlea	3	7	3
11	(Japan) A Sugiyama	6	5	6
16	(United States) L Raymond	6	0	6
Q	(United States) J Hopkins	4	6	1
(Canada) S Jeyaseelan	6	6
(Bulgaria) M Maleeva	4	2
Q	(Israel) T Obziler	1	1
(Argentina) P Suárez	6	6

Second round
7	(Russia) A Kournikova	7	7^{7}
(Luxembourg) A Kremer	5	6^{4}
(Australia) N Pratt	6	7
11	(Japan) A Sugiyama	1	5
16	(United States) L Raymond	4	4
(Canada) S Jeyaseelan	6	6
(Argentina) P Suárez	6	4	5
2	(United States) S Williams	3	6	2^{r}

Third round
7	(Russia) A Kournikova	6	7
(Australia) N Pratt	0	5
(Canada) S Jeyaseelan	2	3
(Argentina) P Suárez	6	6

Quarterfinals
7	(Russia) A Kournikova	6	2	4
(Argentina) P Suárez	2	6	6
