= Mary Pierce career statistics =

Career finals
Discipline	Type	Won	Lost	Total
Singles	Grand Slam	2	4	6
Singles	Summer Olympics	0	0	0
Singles	WTA Finals (Note: Formerly known as WTA Tour Championships/WTA Championships until 2014.)	0	2	2
Singles	WTA 1000 (Note: Formerly known as: Category 4 & 5 & 6 (until 1990); Tier I (until 2009); WTA Premier Mandatory and 5 (until 2021))	5	4	9
Singles	WTA 500 (Note: Formerly known as: Category 3 (until 1990); Tier II (until 2009); WTA Premier (until 2021))	5	11	16
Singles	WTA 250 (Note: Formerly known as: Category 1 & 2 (until 1990); Tier III & IV & V (until 2009); WTA International (until 2021))	6	2	8
Singles	Total	18	23	41
Doubles	Grand Slam	1	1	2
Doubles	Summer Olympics	0	0	0
Doubles	WTA Finals	0	0	0
Doubles	WTA 1000	3	0	3
Doubles	WTA 500	5	3	8
Doubles	WTA 250	1	2	3
Doubles	Total	10	6	16
Mixed doubles	Grand Slam	1	0	1
Mixed doubles	Total	1	0	1
Total		29	29	58

This is a list of the main career statistics of French professional tennis player Mary Pierce. She won at least one Grand Slam in each disciplines. In singles, she triumphed at the 1995 Australian Open and later on the 2000 French Open she won titles in both singles and doubles (alongside Martina Hingis). Five years later, she won 2005 Wimbledon Championships alongside Mahesh Bhupathi in mixed doubles. At the Women's Tennis Association (WTA) rankings, she reached career highest of world No. 3 in both singles (1995) and doubles (2000). During her career, she collected total of 29 WTA Tour titles (18 singles, 10 doubles and one in mixed doubles).

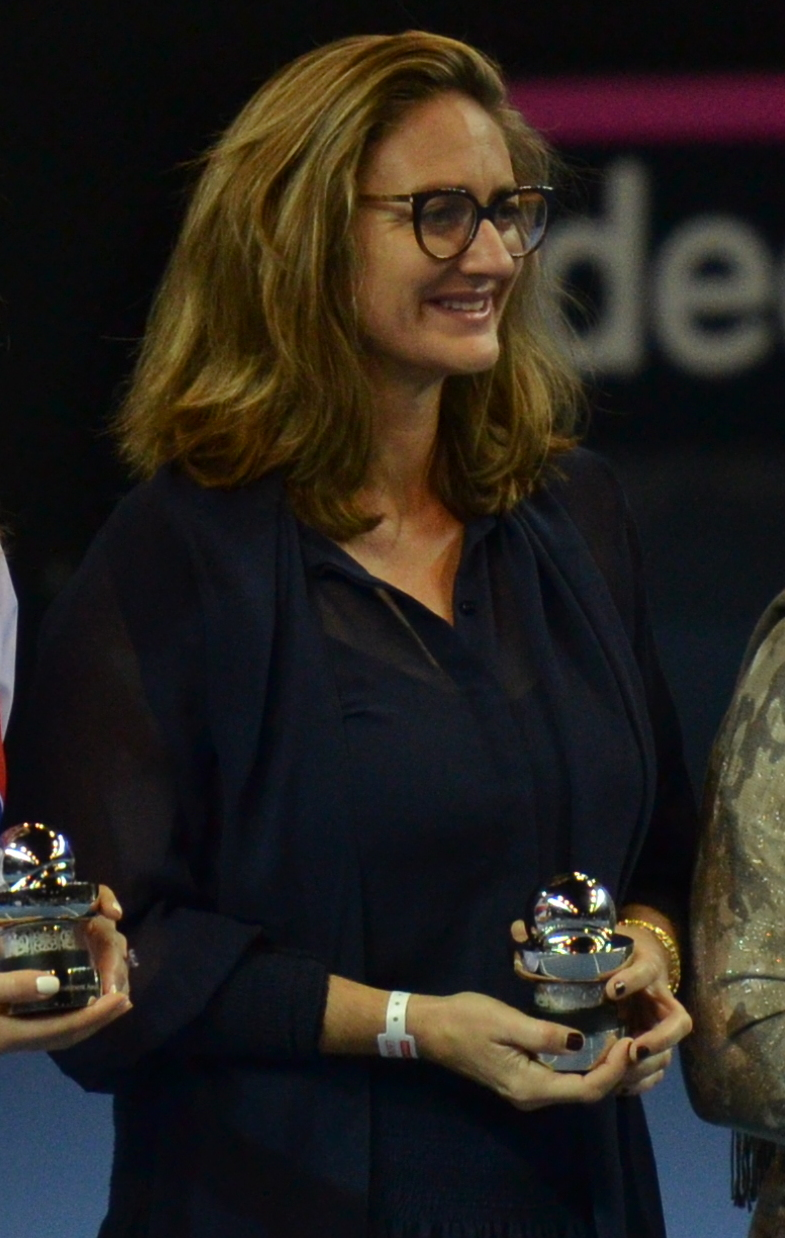
Pierce at the 2016 Billie Jean King Cup (Fed Cup).

== Performance timelines ==
Key
W	F	SF	QF	#R	RR	Q#	P#	DNQ	A	Z#	PO	G	S	B	NMS	NTI	P	NH

(W) winner; (F) finalist; (SF) semifinalist; (QF) quarterfinalist; (#R) rounds 4, 3, 2, 1; (RR) round-robin stage; (Q#) qualification round; (P#) preliminary round; (DNQ) did not qualify; (A) absent; (Z#) Davis/Fed Cup Zonal Group (with number indication) or (PO) play-off; (G) gold, (S) silver or (B) bronze Olympic/Paralympic medal; (NMS) not a Masters tournament; (NTI) not a Tier I tournament; (P) postponed; (NH) not held; (SR) strike rate (events won / competed); (W–L) win–loss record.
To avoid confusion and double counting, these charts are updated at the conclusion of a tournament or when the player's participation has ended.

=== Singles ===
Tournament	1989	1990	1991	1992	1993	1994	1995	1996	1997	1998	1999	2000	2001	2002	2003	2004	2005	2006	SR	W–L	Win%
Grand Slam tournaments
Australian Open	A	A	A	A	QF	4R	W	2R	F	QF	QF	4R	3R	1R	2R	A	1R	2R	1 / 13	36–12	75%
French Open	A	2R	3R	4R	4R	F	4R	3R	4R	2R	2R	W	A	QF	1R	3R	F	A	1 / 15	44–14	76%
Wimbledon	A	A	A	A	A	A	2R	QF	4R	1R	4R	2R	A	3R	4R	1R	QF	A	0 / 10	21–10	68%
US Open	A	Q3	3R	4R	4R	QF	3R	A	4R	4R	QF	4R	A	1R	4R	4R	F	3R	0 / 14	41–14	75%
Win–loss	0–0	1–1	4–2	6–2	10–3	13–3	13–3	7–3	15–4	8–4	12–4	14–3	2–1	6–4	7–4	5–3	16–4	3–2	2 / 52	142–50	74%
Year-end championship
WTA Finals	DNQ				SF	SF	1R	DNQ	F	QF	QF	A	DNQ				F	A	0 / 7	13–7	65%
National representation
Summer Olympics	NH			2R	NH			2R	NH			A	NH			QF	NH		0 / 2	4–2	67%
WTA 1000 + former^{†} tournaments
Indian Wells Open	A	NMS						A	A	A	QF	SF	A	A	A	A	QF	A	0 / 3	9–3	75%
Miami Open	A	A	4R	3R	A	A	A	A	A	A	4R	2R	A	A	A	A	A	A	0 / 4	6–4	60%
Italian Open	A	A	A	2R	3R	3R	SF	A	W	3R	F	3R	1R	3R	A	2R	3R	A	1 / 12	23–11	68%
Canadian Open	A	A	A	A	A	SF	QF	3R	3R	1R	SF	A	A	1R	2R	3R	A	A	0 / 9	13–9	59%
Pan Pacific Open^{†}	A	NMS			1R	A	QF	A	A	A	A	2R	A	A	1R	A	A	A	0 / 4	1–4	20%
Ameritech Cup^{†}	A	1R	NMS/NH																0 / 1	0–1	0%
Charleston Open^{†}	1R	A	A	A	A	SF	A	2R	A	2R	A	W	3R	3R	QF	1R	2R	A	1 / 10	16–9	64%
Houston Championships^{†}	1R	NMS/NH																	0 / 1	0–1	0%
Berlin Open ^{†}	A	A	A	A	A	3R	QF	3R	F	2R	A	A	A	2R	1R	1R	3R	A	0 / 9	12–9	57%
Southern California Open^{†}	NMS															2R	W	QF	1 / 3	8–2	80%
Kremlin Cup^{†}	NMS/NH								A	W	2R	A	A	A	A	1R	W	A	2 / 4	9–2	82%
Zürich Open^{†}	A	NMS			A	QF	F	A	A	QF	SF	A	A	A	1R	1R	A	1R	0 / 7	9–7	56%
Philadelphia Championships^{†}	NMS/NH				2R	F	2R	NMS/NH											0 / 3	5–3	63%
Win–loss	0–2	0–1	3–1	1–2	3–3	14–6	11–6	3–3	12–2	8–5	13–6	10–4	1–2	5–4	4–5	4–7	17–4	2–2	5 / 70	111–65	63%
Career statistics
	1989	1990	1991	1992	1993	1994	1995	1996	1997	1998	1999	2000	2001	2002	2003	2004	2005	2006	SR	W–L	Win%
Tournaments	3	7	10	13	16	16	16	12	16	16	21	13	8	13	17	18	14	8	Career total: 237		
Titles	0	0	1	3	1	0	2	0	1	4	1	2	0	0	0	1	2	0	Career total: 18		
Finals	0	0	1	3	2	5	4	1	5	5	5	2	0	0	0	2	5	1	Career total: 41		
Hardcourt win–loss	0–1	1–3	16–7	21–6	25–10	27–10	27–10	5–5	22–13	32–7	31–14	13–7	5–5	1–5	18–13	16–11	25–6	9–8	11 / 146	294–141	68%
Clay win–loss	0–2	5–4	7–2	13–5	13–5	18–8	9–5	10–6	21–4	7–4	11–5	15–3	1–3	11–6	4–4	5–5	14–6	0–0	6 / 78	164–77	68%
Grass win–loss	0–0	0–0	0–0	0–0	0–0	0–0	1–1	4–2	4–1	0–1	3–1	1–1	0–0	2–2	3–1	5–1	4–1	0–0	1 / 13	27–12	69%
Overall win–loss	0–3	6–7	23–9	34–11	38–15	45–18	37–16	19–13	47–18	39–12	45–20	29–11	6–8	14–13	25–18	26–17	43–13	9–8	18 / 237	485–230	68%
Win %	0%	46%	72%	76%	72%	71%	70%	59%	72%	76%	69%	73%	43%	52%	58%	60%	75%	53%	Career total: 68%		
Year-end ranking	243	107	26	13	12	5	5	20	7	7	5	7	130	52	33	29	5	79	$9,793,119		

=== Doubles ===
Tournament	1990	1991	1992	1993	1994	1995	1996	1997	1998	1999	2000	2001	2002	2003	2004	2005	2006	SR	W–L	Win%
Grand Slam tournaments
Australian Open	A	A	A	1R	A	A	A	1R	A	1R	F	3R	A	QF	A	A	A	0 / 6	10–6	63%
French Open	A	QF	QF	1R	A	A	A	2R (Note: Withdraw during the tournament. Not counted as a loss.)	1R	SF	W	A	A	A	A	2R	A	1 / 8	18–6	75%
Wimbledon	A	A	A	A	A	A	A	1R	1R	A	2R	A	3R	A	3R	A	A	0 / 5	5–5	50%
US Open	2R	1R	1R	A	A	A	A	2R	1R	SF	3R	A	A	3R	A	A	A	0 / 8	10–7	59%
Win–loss	1–1	3–2	3–2	0–2	0–0	0–0	0–0	2–3	0–3	8–3	14–2	2–1	2–1	5–2	2–1	1–1	0–0	2 / 27	43–24	64%
National representation
Summer Olympics	NH		A	NH			2R	NH			A	NH			2R	NH		0 / 2	2–1	67%
WTA 1000 + former tournaments
Indian Wells Open	NMS						A	A	A	1R	SF	A	A	A	A	2R	A	0 / 3	4–3	57%
Miami Open	A	1R	A	A	A	A	A	A	A	3R	QF	A	A	A	A	A	A	0 / 3	3–2	60%
Italian Open	A	A	QF	A	1R	A	A	2R	1R	SF	A	QF	A	A	1R	A	A	0 / 7	7–7	50%
Canadian Open	A	A	A	A	2R	A	A	1R	A	W	A	A	1R	SF	SF	A	A	1 / 6	11–5	69%
Pan Pacific Open (former)	NMS			QF	A	1R	A	A	A	A	W	A	A	A	A	A	A	1 / 3	5–2	71%
Florida Championships (former)	NMS	2R	A	NMS/NH														0 / 1	1–1	50%
Charleston Open (former)	A	A	A	A	QF	A	A	A	2R	A	A	A	A	A	A	QF	A	0 / 3	5–2	71%
Berlin Open (former)	A	A	A	A	1R	A	A	A	A	1R	A	A	A	A	QF	2R	A	0 / 4	3–4	43%
Southern California Open (former)	NMS														2R	QF	A	0 / 2	3–2	60%
Kremlin Cup (former)	NMS/NH							A	W	QF	A	A	A	A	A	A	A	1 / 2	5–0	100%
Zürich Open (former)	NMS			A	QF	1R	A	A	A	1R	A	A	A	1R	1R	A	1R	0 / 6	1–6	14%
Win–loss	0–0	1–2	2–1	1–1	4–5	0–2	0–0	1–2	5–1	9–4	9–2	1–1	0–1	3–2	6–5	6–4	0–1	3 / 40	48–34	59%
Career statistics
Tournaments	8	11	6	6	10	6	3	10	7	17	10	5	4	11	9	7	1	Career total: 131		

== Grand Slam tournament finals ==
=== Singles: 6 (2 titles, 4 runner-ups) ===
Result	Year	Tournament	Surface	Opponent	Score
Loss	1994	French Open	Clay	(Spain) Arantxa Sánchez Vicario	4–6, 4–6
Win	1995	Australian Open	Hard	(Spain) Arantxa Sánchez Vicario	6–3, 6–2
Loss	1997	Australian Open	Hard	(Switzerland) Martina Hingis	2–6, 2–6
Win	2000	French Open	Clay	(Spain) Conchita Martínez	6–2, 7–5
Loss	2005	French Open	Clay	(Belgium) Justine Henin	1–6, 1–6
Loss	2005	US Open	Hard	(Belgium) Kim Clijsters	3–6, 1–6

=== Doubles: 2 (1 title, 1 runner–up) ===
Result	Year	Tournament	Surface	Partner	Opponents	Score
Loss	2000	Australian Open	Hard	(Switzerland) Martina Hingis	(United States) Lisa Raymond (Australia) Rennae Stubbs	4–6, 7–5, 4–6
Win	2000	French Open	Clay	(Switzerland) Martina Hingis	(Spain) Virginia Ruano Pascual (Argentina) Paola Suárez	6–2, 6–4

=== Mixed doubles: 1 (1 title) ===
Result	Year	Tournament	Surface	Partner	Opponents	Score
Win	2005	Wimbledon	Grass	(India) Mahesh Bhupathi	(Ukraine) Tatiana Perebiynis (Australia) Paul Hanley	6–4, 6–2

== Other significant finals ==
=== WTA Finals ===
==== Singles: 2 (2 runner-ups) ====
Result	Year	Tournament	Surface	Opponent	Score	Ref
Loss	1997	WTA Finals, New York	Carpet (i)	(Czech Republic) Jana Novotná	6–7^{(4–7)}, 2–6, 3–6	
Loss	2005	WTA Finals, Los Angeles	Hard (i)	(France) Amélie Mauresmo	7–5, 6–7^{(3–7)}, 4–6	

=== WTA 1000 tournaments ===
==== Singles: 9 (5 titles, 4 runner-ups) ====
Result	Year	Tournament	Surface	Opponent	Score
Loss	1994	Philadelphia Championships	Carpet (i)	(Germany) Anke Huber	0–6, 7–6^{(7–4)}, 5–7
Loss	1995	Zurich Open	Carpet (i)	(Croatia) Iva Majoli	4–6, 4–6
Win	1997	Italian Open	Clay	(Spain) Conchita Martínez	6–4, 6–0
Loss	1997	German Open	Clay	(United States) Mary Joe Fernández	4–6, 2–6
Win	1998	Kremlin Cup	Carpet (i)	(United States) Monica Seles	7–6^{(7–2)}, 6–3
Loss	1999	Italian Open	Clay	(United States) Venus Williams	4–6, 2–6
Win	2000	Charleston Open	Clay	(Spain) Arantxa Sánchez Vicario	6–1, 6–0
Win	2005	Southern California Open	Hard	(Japan) Ai Sugiyama	6–0, 6–3
Win	2005	Kremlin Cup	Carpet (i)	(Italy) Francesca Schiavone	6–4, 6–3

==== Doubles: 3 (3 titles) ====
Result	Year	Tournament	Surface	Partner	Opponents	Score
Win	1998	Kremlin Cup	Carpet (i)	(Belarus) Natasha Zvereva	(United States) Lisa Raymond; (Australia) Rennae Stubbs	6–3, 6–4
Win	1999	Canadian Open	Hard	(Czech Republic) Jana Novotná	(Latvia) Larisa Neiland (Spain) Arantxa Sánchez Vicario	6–3, 2–6, 6–3
Win	2000	Pan Pacific Open	Carpet (i)	(Switzerland) Martina Hingis	(France) Alexandra Fusai; (France) Nathalie Tauziat	6–4, 6–1

== WTA Tour finals ==
=== Singles: 41 (18 titles, 23 runner–ups) ===
Legend Grand Slam (2–4) Year-end (Finals) (0–2) WTA 1000 (Tier I) (5–4) WTA 500 (Tier II) (5–11) WTA 250 (Tier III / Tier IV / Tier V) (6–2)	Finals by surface Hard (5–7) Grass (1–0) Clay (6–9) Carpet (6–7)

Result	W–L	Date	Tournament	Tier	Surface	Opponent	Score
Win	1–0	Jul 1991	Palermo International, Italy	Tier V	Clay	(Italy) Sandra Cecchini	6–0, 6–3
Win	2–0	Feb 1992	Cesena Championships, Italy	Tier V	Carpet (i)	(France) Catherine Tanvier	6–1, 6–1
Win	3–0	Jul 1992	Palermo International, Italy	Tier V	Clay	(Netherlands) Brenda Schultz	6–1, 6–7^{(3–7)}, 6–1
Win	4–0	Oct 1992	Puerto Rico Open, Puerto Rico	Tier IV	Hard	(United States) Gigi Fernández	6–1, 7–5
Loss	4–1	Jul 1993	Palermo International, Italy	Tier IV	Clay	(Czech Republic) Radka Bobková	3–6, 2–6
Win	5–1	Oct 1993	Stuttgart Open, Germany	Tier II	Hard (i)	(Belarus) Natasha Zvereva	6–3, 6–3
Loss	5–2	Mar 1994	Virginia Slims of Houston, United States	Tier II	Clay	(Germany) Sabine Hack	5–7, 4–6
Loss	5–3	May 1994	French Open, France	Grand Slam	Clay	(Spain) Arantxa Sánchez Vicario	4–6, 4–6
Loss	5–4	Sep 1994	Sparkassen Cup, Germany	Tier II	Carpet (i)	(Czech Republic) Jana Novotná	5–7, 1–6
Loss	5–5	Oct 1994	Stuttgart Open, Germany	Tier II	Hard (i)	(Germany) Anke Huber	4–6, 2–6
Loss	5–6	Nov 1994	Philadelphia Championships, United States	Tier I	Carpet (i)	(Germany) Anke Huber	0–6, 7–6^{(7–4)}, 5–7
Win	6–6	Jan 1995	Australian Open, Australia	Grand Slam	Hard	(Spain) Arantxa Sánchez Vicario	6–3, 6–2
Loss	6–7	Feb 1995	Open GDF Suez, France	Tier II	Carpet (i)	(Germany) Steffi Graf	2–6, 2–6
Win	7–7	Sep 1995	Nichirei International Championships, Japan	Tier II	Hard	(Spain) Arantxa Sánchez Vicario	6–3, 6–3
Loss	7–8	Oct 1995	Zürich Open, Switzerland	Tier I	Carpet (i)	(Croatia) Iva Majoli	4–6, 4–6
Loss	7–9	Apr 1996	Amelia Island Championships, United States	Tier II	Clay	(Romania) Irina Spîrlea	7–6^{(9–7)}, 4–6, 3–6
Loss	7–10	Jan 1997	Australian Open, Australia	Grand Slam	Hard	(Switzerland) Martina Hingis	2–6, 2–6
Loss	7–11	Apr 1997	Amelia Island Championships, United States	Tier II	Clay	(United States) Lindsay Davenport	2–6, 3–6
Win	8–11	May 1997	Italian Open, Italy	Tier I	Clay	(Spain) Conchita Martínez	6–4, 6–0
Loss	8–12	May 1997	Berlin Open, Germany	Tier I	Clay	(United States) Mary Joe Fernández	4–6, 2–6
Loss	8–13	Nov 1997	WTA Finals, New York	Finals	Carpet (i)	(Czech Republic) Jana Novotná	6–7^{(4–7)}, 2–6, 3–6
Win	9–13	Feb 1998	Open GDF Suez, France	Tier II	Carpet (i)	(Belgium) Dominique Van Roost	6–3, 7–5
Win	10–13	Apr 1998	Amelia Island Championships, United States	Tier II	Clay	(Spain) Conchita Martínez	6–7^{(8–10)}, 6–0, 6–2
Loss	10–14	Aug 1998	Southern California Open, United States	Tier II	Hard	(United States) Lindsay Davenport	3–6, 1–6
Win	11–14	Oct 1998	Kremlin Cup, Russia	Tier I	Carpet (i)	(United States) Monica Seles	7–6^{(7–2)}, 6–3
Win	12–14	Oct 1998	Luxembourg Open, Luxembourg	Tier III	Carpet (i)	(Italy) Silvia Farina	6–0, 2–0 ret.
Loss	12–15	Jan 1999	Brisbane International, Australia	Tier III	Hard	(Switzerland) Patty Schnyder	6–4, 6–7^{(5–7)}, 2–6
Loss	12–16	Apr 1999	Hamburg Open, Germany	Tier II	Clay	(United States) Venus Williams	0–6, 3–6
Loss	12–17	May 1999	Italian Open, Italy	Tier I	Clay	(United States) Venus Williams	4–6, 2–6
Loss	12–18	Oct 1999	Stuttgart Open, Germany	Tier II	Hard (i)	(Switzerland) Martina Hingis	4–6, 1–6
Win	13–18	Oct 1999	Linz Open, Austria	Tier II	Carpet (i)	(France) Sandrine Testud	7–6^{(7–2)}, 6–1
Win	14–18	Apr 2000	Charleston Open, United States	Tier I	Clay	(Spain) Arantxa Sánchez Vicario	6–1, 6–0
Win	15–18	May 2000	French Open, France	Grand Slam	Clay	(Spain) Conchita Martínez	6–2, 7–5
Loss	15–19	Feb 2004	Open GDF Suez, France	Tier II	Carpet (i)	(Belgium) Kim Clijsters	2–6, 1–6
Win	16–19	Jun 2004	Rosmalen Championships, Netherlands	Tier III	Grass	(Czech Republic) Klára Koukalová	7–6^{(8–6)}, 6–2
Loss	16–20	May 2005	French Open, France	Grand Slam	Clay	(Belgium) Justine Henin-Hardenne	1–6, 1–6
Win	17–20	Aug 2005	Southern California Open, United States	Tier I	Hard	(Japan) Ai Sugiyama	6–0, 6–3
Loss	17–21	Aug 2005	US Open, United States	Grand Slam	Hard	(Belgium) Kim Clijsters	3–6, 1–6
Win	18–21	Oct 2005	Kremlin Cup, Russia	Tier I	Carpet (i)	(Italy) Francesca Schiavone	6–4, 6–3
Loss	18–22	Nov 2005	WTA Finals, Los Angeles	Finals	Hard (i)	(France) Amélie Mauresmo	7–5, 6–7^{(3–7)}, 4–6
Loss	18–23	Feb 2006	Open GDF Suez, France	Tier II	Carpet (i)	(France) Amélie Mauresmo	1–6, 6–7^{(2–7)}

=== Doubles: 16 (10 titles, 6 runner–ups) ===
Legend Grand Slam (1–1) WTA 1000 (Tier I) (3–0) WTA 500 (Tier II) (5–3) WTA 250 (Tier III / Tier V) (1–2)	Finals by surface Hard (3–2) Grass (0–1) Clay (4–1) Carpet (3–2)

Result	W–L	Date	Tournament	Tier	Surface	Partner	Opponents	Score
Loss	0–1	Nov 1990	WTA Brasil Open, Brazil	Tier V	Clay	(United States) Luanne Spadea	(Argentina) Bettina Fulco; (Czechoslovakia) Eva Švíglerová	5–7, 4–6
Win	1–1	Jul 1991	Palermo International, Italy	Tier V	Clay	(Czechoslovakia) Petra Langrová	(Italy) Laura Garrone; (Argentina) Mercedes Paz	6–3, 6–7^{(5–7)}, 6–3
Loss	1–2	Nov 1992	Philadelphia Championships, United States	Tier II	Carpet (i)	(Spain) Conchita Martínez	(United States) Gigi Fernández; (Belarus) Natasha Zvereva	1–6, 3–6
Loss	1–3	Feb 1994	Open GDF Suez, France	Tier II	Carpet (i)	(Hungary) Andrea Temesvári	(Belgium) Sabine Appelmans; (Belgium) Laurence Courtois	4–6, 4–6
Win	2–3	Sep 1996	Nichirei International Championships, Japan	Tier II	Hard	(South Africa) Amanda Coetzer	(South Korea) Park Sung-hee; (Chinese Taipei) Wang Shi-ting	6–1, 7–6^{(7–5)}
Win	3–3	Apr 1997	Hamburg Open, Germany	Tier II	Clay	(Germany) Anke Huber	(Romania) Ruxandra Dragomir; (Croatia) Iva Majoli	2–6, 7–6^{(7–1)}, 6–2
Win	4–3	Apr 1998	Amelia Island Championships, United States	Tier II	Clay	(United States) Sandra Cacic	(Austria) Barbara Schett; (Switzerland) Patty Schnyder	7–6^{(7–5)}, 4–6, 7–6^{(7–5)}
Win	5–3	Oct 1998	Kremlin Cup, Russia	Tier I	Carpet (i)	(Belarus) Natasha Zvereva	(United States) Lisa Raymond; (Australia) Rennae Stubbs	6–3, 6–4
Win	6–3	Aug 1999	Canadian Open (Toronto), Canada	Tier I	Hard	(Czech Republic) Jana Novotná	(Latvia) Larisa Neiland; (Spain) Arantxa Sánchez Vicario	6–3, 2–6, 6–3
Win	7–3	Nov 1999	Sparkassen Cup, Germany	Tier II	Carpet (i)	(Latvia) Larisa Neiland	(Russia) Elena Likhovtseva; (Japan) Ai Sugiyama	6–4, 6–3
Loss	7–4	Jan 2000	Sydney International, Australia	Tier II	Hard	(Switzerland) Martina Hingis	(France) Julie Halard-Decugis (Japan) Ai Sugiyama	0–6, 3–6
Loss	7–5	Jan 2000	Australian Open, Australia	Grand Slam	Hard	(Switzerland) Martina Hingis	(United States) Lisa Raymond (Australia) Rennae Stubbs	4–6, 7–5, 4–6
Win	8–5	Jan 2000	Pan Pacific Open, Japan	Tier I	Carpet (i)	(Switzerland) Martina Hingis	(France) Alexandra Fusai; (France) Nathalie Tauziat	6–4, 6–1
Win	9–5	May 2000	French Open, France	Grand Slam	Clay	(Switzerland) Martina Hingis	(Spain) Virginia Ruano Pascual; (Argentina) Paola Suárez	6–2, 6–4
Loss	9–6	Jun 2003	Rosmalen Championships, Netherlands	Tier III	Grass	(Russia) Nadia Petrova	(Russia) Elena Dementieva; (Russia) Lina Krasnoroutskaya	6–2, 3–6, 4–6
Win	10–6	Aug 2003	LA Championships, United States	Tier II	Hard	(Australia) Rennae Stubbs	(Russia) Elena Bovina; (Belgium) Els Callens	6–3, 6–3

== ITF Circuit finals ==
=== Singles: 4 (2 titles, 2 runner–ups) ===
Legend
25K tournaments
10K tournaments

Result	W–L	Date	Tournament	Tier	Surface	Opponent	Score
Win	1–0	Aug 1989	ITF York, United States	10K	Clay	(United States) Shannan McCarthy	6–2, 6–2
Win	2–0	Jan 1990	ITF New Braunfels, United States	10K	Hard	(United States) Pamela Jung	7–5, 7–6^{(6)}
Loss	2–1	Jan 1990	ITF Midland, United States	25K	Hard	(Italy) Linda Ferrando	4–6, 1–6
Loss	2–2	Jul 1990	ITF Brindisi, Italy	25K	Hard	(Switzerland) Csilla Bartos	6–2, 2–6, 2–6

=== Doubles: 5 (4 titles, 1 runner–up) ===
Legend
25K tournaments
10K tournaments

Result	W–L	Date	Tournament	Tier	Surface	Partner	Opponents	Score
Win	1–0	Jul 1989	ITF Roanoke, United States	10K	Hard	(United States) Shannan McCarthy	(United States) Anne-Marie Walson (United States) Tammy Whittington	6–4 6–2
Win	2–0	Aug 19891	ITF York, United States	10K	Clay	(United States) Shannan McCarthy	(Australia) Sharon McNamara (United States) Jennifer Young	6–2, 6–2
Win	3–0	Jan 1990	ITF New Braunfels, United States	10K	Hard	(United States) Jennifer Santrock	(West Germany) Sabine Lohmann (West Germany) Stefanie Rehmke	6–4, 6–4
Loss	3–1	Jan 1990	ITF Midland, United States	25K	Hard	(United States) Ann Wunderlich	(United States) Alissa Finerman (United States) Lisa Seemann	6–3, 3–6, 1–6
Win	4–1	Jul 1990	ITF Brindisi, Italy	25K	Clay	(France) Sandrine Testud	(United States) Jennifer Fuchs (Netherlands) Simone Schilder	6–1, 1–6, 6–0

== Wins against top 10 players ==
#	Player	vsRank	Event	Surface	Round	Score	Rank	Years	Ref
1.	(Argentina) Gabriela Sabatini	6	WTA Finals, United States	Carpet (i)	1R	7–6^{(10–8)}, 6–3	16	1993	
2.	(United States) Martina Navratilova	3	WTA Finals, United States	Carpet (i)	QF	6–1, 3–6, 6–4	16	1993	
3.	(Spain) Arantxa Sánchez Vicario	2	Charleston Open, United States	Clay	QF	6–4, 2–6, 6–1	13	1994	
4.	(Germany) Steffi Graf	1	French Open, France	Clay	SF	6–2, 6–2	12	1994	
5.	(Belarus) Natasha Zvereva	10	Philadelphia Championships, United States	Carpet (i)	SF	6–3, 6–3	5	1994	
6.	(Germany) Steffi Graf	1	WTA Finals, United States	Carpet (i)	QF	6–4, 6–4	5	1994	
7.	(Germany) Anke Huber	10	Australian Open, Australia	Hard	4R	6–2, 6–4	10	1995	
8.	(Belarus) Natasha Zvereva	8	Australian Open, Australia	Hard	QF	6–1, 6–4	8	1995	
9.	(Spain) Conchita Martínez	3	Australian Open, Australia	Hard	SF	6–3, 6–1	3	1995	
10.	(Spain) Arantxa Sánchez Vicario	2	Australian Open, Australia	Hard	F	6–3, 6–2	2	1995	
11.	(Spain) Arantxa Sánchez Vicario	2	Nichirei International Championships, Japan	Hard	F	6–3, 6–3	2	1995	
12.	(Spain) Conchita Martínez	2	Amelia Island Championships, United States	Clay	QF	5–7, 6–3, 6–2	14	1996	
13.	(Spain) Arantxa Sánchez Vicario	3	Fed Cup, Bayonne, France	Carpet (i)	SF	6–3, 6–4	13	1996	
14.	(Romania) Irina Spîrlea	10	Sydney International, Australia	Hard	1R	6–3, 4–6, 6–4	25	1997	
15.	(Germany) Anke Huber	7	Australian Open, Australia	Hard	4R	6–2, 6–3	22	1997	
16.	(Germany) Anke Huber	7	Amelia Island Championships, United States	Clay	3R	7–6^{(7–0)}, 6–2	15	1997	
17.	(Spain) Arantxa Sánchez Vicario	5	Amelia Island Championships, United States	Clay	QF	6–2, 6–1	15	1997	
18.	(Croatia) Iva Majoli	9	Amelia Island Championships, United States	Clay	SF	2–6, 7–5, 7–6^{(7–5)}	15	1997	
19.	(United States) Monica Seles	3	Italian Open, Italy	Clay	3R	7–6^{(8–6)}, 7–6^{(8–6)}	15	1997	
20.	(Spain) Conchita Martínez	6	Italian Open, Italy	Clay	F	6–4, 6–0	15	1997	
21.	(Spain) Conchita Martínez	8	German Open, Germany	Clay	3R	6–2, 6–0	11	1997	
22.	(Croatia) Iva Majoli	9	German Open, Germany	Clay	QF	6–1, 6–4	11	1997	
23.	(South Africa) Amanda Coetzer	10	German Open, Germany	Clay	SF	6–4, 6–4	11	1997	
24.	(Switzerland) Martina Hingis	1	WTA Finals, United States	Carpet (i)	QF	6–3, 2–6, 7–5	7	1997	
25.	(Czech Republic) Jana Novotná	3	Open GDF Suez, France	Carpet (i)	SF	6–4, 2–6, 6–3	9	1998	
26.	(Croatia) Iva Majoli	8	Amelia Island Championships, United States	Clay	QF	6–3, 6–2	6	1998	
27.	(United States) Lindsay Davenport	2	Amelia Island Championships, United States	Clay	SF	4–6, 6–3, 6–3	6	1998	
28.	(Spain) Conchita Martínez	9	Amelia Island Championships, United States	Clay	F	6–7^{(8–10)}, 6–0, 6–2	6	1998	
29.	(Spain) Conchita Martínez	7	Southern California Open, United States	Hard	2R	6–7^{(1–7)}, 6–2, 6–3	16	1998	
30.	(United States) Venus Williams	5	Southern California Open, United States	Hard	QF	2–6, 7–6^{(7–3)}, 4–0 ret.	16	1998	
31.	(Switzerland) Martina Hingis	1	Southern California Open, United States	Hard	SF	3–6, 7–6^{(9–7)}, 6–2	16	1998	
32.	(South Africa) Amanda Coetzer	10	Stuttgart Open, Germany	Hard (i)	1R	6–2, 6–2	11	1998	
33.	(United States) Venus Williams	5	Kremlin Cup, Russia	Carpet (i)	SF	2–6, 6–2, 6–0	11	1998	
34.	(United States) Monica Seles	6	Kremlin Cup, Russia	Carpet (i)	F	7–6^{(7–2)}, 6–3	11	1998	
35.	(Austria) Barbara Schett	8	Stuttgart Open, Germany	Hard (i)	QF	7–6^{(7–1)}, 7–6^{(7–2)}	6	1999	
36.	(United States) Serena Williams	4	Indian Wells Open, United States	Hard	SF	6–2, 6–1	6	2000	
37.	(United States) Monica Seles	7	Charleston Open, United States	Clay	SF	6–1, 6–1	4	2000	
38.	(Spain) Arantxa Sánchez Vicario	10	Charleston Open, United States	Clay	F	6–1, 6–0	4	2000	
39.	(United States) Monica Seles	3	French Open, France	Clay	QF	4–6, 6–3, 6–4	7	2000	
40.	(Switzerland) Martina Hingis	1	French Open, France	Clay	SF	6–4, 5–7, 6–2	7	2000	
41.	(Spain) Conchita Martínez	5	French Open, France	Clay	F	6–2, 7–5	7	2000	
42.	(France) Sandrine Testud	10	Wimbledon, United Kingdom	Grass	2R	6–3, 6–4	74	2002	
43.	(Russia) Anastasia Myskina	10	Charleston Open, United States	Clay	2R	6–4, 1–6, 6–2	43	2003	
44.	(United States) Jennifer Capriati	5	Stuttgart Open, Germany	Hard (i)	2R	6–4, 6–2	48	2003	
45.	(Russia) Maria Sharapova	7	US Open, United States	Hard	3R	4–6, 6–2, 6–3	29	2004	
46.	(Switzerland) Patty Schnyder	10	French Open, France	Clay	4R	6–1, 1–6, 6–4	23	2005	
47.	(United States) Lindsay Davenport	1	French Open, France	Clay	QF	6–3, 6–2	23	2005	
48.	(Belgium) Justine Hénin-Hardenne	7	US Open, United States	Hard	4R	6–3, 6–4	12	2005	
49.	(France) Amélie Mauresmo	3	US Open, United States	Hard	QF	6–4, 6–1	12	2005	
50.	(Russia) Elena Dementieva	6	US Open, United States	Hard	SF	3–6, 6–2, 6–2	12	2005	
51.	(Belgium) Kim Clijsters	2	WTA Finals, United States	Hard (i)	RR	6–1, 4–6, 7–6^{(7–2)}	5	2005	
52.	(France) Amélie Mauresmo	4	WTA Finals, United States	Hard (i)	RR	2–6, 6–4, 6–2	5	2005	
53.	(Russia) Elena Dementieva	7	WTA Finals, United States	Hard (i)	RR	6–2, 6–3	5	2005	
54.	(United States) Lindsay Davenport	1	WTA Finals, United States	Hard (i)	SF	7–6^{(7–5)}, 7–6^{(8–6)}	5	2005	
55.	(Switzerland) Patty Schnyder	9	Open GDF Suez, France	Carpet (i)	SF	6–4, 6–2	6	2006	
