= 1999 Bausch & Lomb Championships – Doubles =

Doubles
- 1999 Bausch & Lomb Championships

Final
- Champions: (Spain) Conchita Martínez (Argentina) Patricia Tarabini
- Runners-up: (United States) Lisa Raymond (Australia) Rennae Stubbs
- Score: 7–5, 0–6, 6–4

Details
- Draw: 28
- Seeds: 8

Events
Singles	Doubles
← 1998 ·	Amelia Island Championships	· 2000 →

The 1999 Bausch & Lomb Championships doubles was the doubles event of the twentieth edition of the Bausch & Lomb Championships; a WTA Tier II tournament held in Amelia Island, Florida, United States, played on green clay. Sandra Cacic and Mary Pierce were the defending champions but lost in the quarterfinals to Lisa Raymond and Rennae Stubbs.

Conchita Martínez and Patricia Tarabini won in the final 7–5, 0–6, 6–4 against Raymond and Stubbs.

== Seeds ==
The top four seeded teams received byes into the second round.

1. (United States) Lisa Raymond / (Australia) Rennae Stubbs (final)
2. (Latvia) Larisa Neiland / (Ukraine) Elena Tatarkova (semifinals)
3. (Spain) Conchita Martínez / (Argentina) Patricia Tarabini (champions)
4. (Austria) Barbara Schett / (Switzerland) Patty Schnyder (quarterfinals)
5. (South Africa) Amanda Coetzer / (Russia) Anna Kournikova (quarterfinals, withdrew)
6. (United States) Katrina Adams / (United States) Chanda Rubin (second round)
7. (Romania) Cătălina Cristea / (Romania) Ruxandra Dragomir (quarterfinals)
8. (United States) Nicole Arendt / (Netherlands) Manon Bollegraf (semifinals)

== Draw ==
=== Key ===
- Q = Qualifier
- WC = Wild card
- LL = Lucky loser
- Alt = Alternate
- SE = Special exempt
- PR = Protected ranking
- ITF = ITF entry
- JE = Junior exempt
- w/o = Walkover
- r = Retired
- d = Defaulted
- SR = Special ranking

=== Final ===
Semifinals

Final

1
- (United States) Lisa Raymond
- (Australia) Rennae Stubbs
4
6
6

8
- (United States) Nicole Arendt
- (Netherlands) Manon Bollegraf
6
3
0

1
- (United States) Lisa Raymond
- (Australia) Rennae Stubbs
5
6
4

3
- (Spain) Conchita Martínez
- (Argentina) Patricia Tarabini
7
0
6

3
- (Spain) Conchita Martínez
- (Argentina) Patricia Tarabini
7^{7}
7^{7}

2
- (Latvia) Larisa Neiland
- (Ukraine) Elena Tatarkova
6^{3}
6^{5}

=== Top half ===
First round

Second round

Quarterfinals

Semifinals

1
- (United States) L Raymond
- (Australia) R Stubbs
6
6

- (Russia) N Petrova
- (United States) B Rippner
3
6
7

- (Russia) N Petrova
- (United States) B Rippner
3
3

- (France) N Dechy
- (Switzerland) E Gagliardi
6
4
5

1
- (United States) L Raymond
- (Australia) R Stubbs
6
6

- (Russia) T Panova
- (United States) M Shaughnessy
2
5

- (United States) S Cacic
- (France) M Pierce
2
4

- (United States) S Cacic
- (France) M Pierce
6
7

- (United States) S Cacic
- (France) M Pierce
7^{8}
6

- (Argentina) M-J Gaidano
- (United Kingdom) J Moore
2
1

6
- (United States) K Adams
- (United States) C Rubin
6^{6}
3

6
- (United States) K Adams
- (United States) C Rubin
6
6

1
- (United States) L Raymond
- (Australia) R Stubbs
4
6
6

8
- (United States) N Arendt
- (Netherlands) M Bollegraf
6
3
0

4
- (Austria) B Schett
- (Switzerland) P Schnyder
6
6

- (Canada) S Jeyaseelan
- (Slovakia) R Zrubáková
6
6

- (Canada) S Jeyaseelan
- (Slovakia) R Zrubáková
3
3

- (Japan) K Ishida
- (Japan) K Nagatomi
3
1

4
- (Austria) B Schett
- (Switzerland) P Schnyder
7
2
5

- (Czech Republic) K Hrdličková
- (Slovenia) T Križan
3
6
3

8
- (United States) N Arendt
- (Netherlands) M Bollegraf
5
6
7

- (Argentina) L Montalvo
- (Germany) B Rittner
6
1
1^{r}

- (Czech Republic) K Hrdličková
- (Slovenia) T Križan
6
6^{4}
4

- (Russia) E Kulikovskaya
- (Paraguay) L Schaerer
1
3

8
- (United States) N Arendt
- (Netherlands) M Bollegraf
4
7^{7}
6

8
- (United States) N Arendt
- (Netherlands) M Bollegraf
6
6

=== Bottom half ===
First round

Second round

Quarterfinals

Semifinals

7
- (Romania) C Cristea
- (Romania) R Dragomir
6
4
6

- (United States) J Craybas
- (United States) L Nikolaus
1
6
4

7
- (Romania) C Cristea
- (Romania) R Dragomir
6
6

- (United States) J Capriati
- (Croatia) I Majoli
2
6
6

- (United States) J Capriati
- (Croatia) I Majoli
4
3

- (Poland) A Olsza
- (United States) L Osterloh
6
4
2

7
- (Romania) C Cristea
- (Romania) R Dragomir
3
1

- (United States) S Reeves
- (Thailand) T Tanasugarn
6
6

3
- (Spain) C Martínez
- (Argentina) P Tarabini
6
6

- (United States) L Lee
- (United States) T Snyder
4
2

- (United States) S Reeves
- (Thailand) T Tanasugarn
6
2
3

3
- (Spain) C Martínez
- (Argentina) P Tarabini
4
6
6

3
- (Spain) C Martínez
- (Argentina) P Tarabini
7^{7}
7^{7}

5
- (South Africa) A Coetzer
- (Russia) A Kournikova
6^{6}
7
7

2
- (Latvia) L Neiland
- (Ukraine) E Tatarkova
6^{3}
6^{5}

(Federal Republic of Yugoslavia) S Naćuk
(Austria) S Plischke
7^{8}
5
5

5
- (South Africa) A Coetzer
- (Russia) A Kournikova
6
1
6

- (Canada) M Drake
- (Greece) C Papadáki
3
0

- (Argentina) I Gorrochategui
- (Australia) N Pratt
4
6
1

- (Argentina) I Gorrochategui
- (Australia) N Pratt
6
6

5
- (South Africa) A Coetzer
- (Russia) A Kournikova

- (South Africa) J Steck
- (Bulgaria) P Stoyanova
4
4

2
- (Latvia) L Neiland
- (Ukraine) E Tatarkova
w/o

- (Slovenia) T Pisnik
- (United States) A Stevenson
6
6

- (Slovenia) T Pisnik
- (United States) A Stevenson
2
0

2
- (Latvia) L Neiland
- (Ukraine) E Tatarkova
6
6
