= 2000 Bausch & Lomb Championships – Doubles =

Doubles
- 2000 Bausch & Lomb Championships
- 1999 Champions: (Spain) Conchita Martínez (Argentina) Patricia Tarabini

Final
- Champions: No champions declared

Details
- Draw: 28 (1 Q / 2 WC )
- Seeds: 8

Events
Singles	Doubles
← 1999 ·	Amelia Island Championships	· 2001 →

Conchita Martínez and Patricia Tarabini were the defending champions, but competed this year with different partners. Martínez teamed up with Arantxa Sánchez Vicario and reached the semifinals, while Tarabini teamed up with Nicole Arendt and lost in quarterfinals to Barbara Schett and Patty Schnyder.

The tournament was cancelled in the semifinal round due to several delays caused by bad weather. Tournament organisers decided to priorize the conclusion of the singles tournament, with players being forced to play two rounds on a single day.

== Seeds ==
The first four seeds received a bye into the second round.

1. (United States) Corina Morariu / (France) Mary Pierce (second round)
2. (United States) Lisa Raymond / (Australia) Rennae Stubbs (quarterfinals)
3. (Spain) Conchita Martínez / (Spain) Arantxa Sánchez Vicario (Semifinals until cancellation)
4. (Romania) Irina Spîrlea / (Netherlands) Caroline Vis (second round, retired)
5. (United States) Chanda Rubin / (France) Sandrine Testud (second round, retired)
6. (South Africa) Amanda Coetzer / (Japan) Ai Sugiyama (Semifinals until cancellation)
7. (United States) Nicole Arendt / (Argentina) Patricia Tarabini (quarterfinals)
8. (Italy) Rita Grande / (Russia) Elena Likhovtseva (quarterfinals)

== Draw ==
Key

- Q = Qualifier
- WC = Wild card
- LL = Lucky loser
- Alt = Alternate
- ITF = ITF entry
- PR = Protected ranking
- SR = Special ranking
- SE = Special exempt
- JE = Junior exempt
- JR = Junior Accelerator Programme entrant
- CO = College Accelerator Programme entrant
- NG = Next Gen Accelerator Program entrant
- w/o = Walkover
- r = Retired
- d = Defaulted

=== Finals ===
Semifinals
(Austria) Barbara Schett (Switzerland) Patty Schnyder
6	(South Africa) Amanda Coetzer (Japan) Ai Sugiyama
3	(Spain) Conchita Martínez (Spain) Arantxa Sánchez Vicario
(Spain) Virginia Ruano Pascual (Argentina) Paola Suárez

Final

=== Top half ===
First round
(Austria) B Schett (Switzerland) P Schnyder	6	6
WC	(Bulgaria) M Maleeva (Colombia) F Zuluaga	2	1
(Australia) C Barclay (Australia) A Ellwood	2	2
(South Africa) N de Villiers (South Africa) J Steck	6	6
(Slovenia) T Pisnik (Croatia) S Talaja	6^{7}	4
7	(United States) N Arendt (Argentina) P Tarabini	7^{9}	6
(South Africa) S de Beer (South Africa) L Horn	6	6
(Croatia) M Lučić (United States) A Stevenson	1	4
(United States) E deLone (Australia) N Pratt	6	6
(United Kingdom) J Pullin (Australia) B Stewart	2	3
(Sweden) Å Carlsson (Canada) S Jeyaseelan	6^{5}	4
6	(South Africa) A Coetzer (Japan) A Sugiyama	7^{7}	6

Second round
1	(United States) C Morariu (France) M Pierce	6	6^{4}	0
(Austria) B Schett (Switzerland) P Schnyder	2	7^{7}	6
(South Africa) N de Villiers (South Africa) J Steck	4	4
7	(United States) N Arendt (Argentina) P Tarabini	6	6
4	(Romania) I Spîrlea (Netherlands) C Vis	0	r
(South Africa) S de Beer (South Africa) L Horn	6
(United States) E deLone (Australia) N Pratt	6^{5}	6^{3}
6	(South Africa) A Coetzer (Japan) A Sugiyama	7^{7}	7^{7}

Quarterfinals
(Austria) B Schett (Switzerland) P Schnyder	6	7
7	(United States) N Arendt (Argentina) P Tarabini	2	5
(South Africa) S de Beer (South Africa) L Horn	6^{1}	3
6	(South Africa) A Coetzer (Japan) A Sugiyama	7^{7}	6

Semifinals
(Austria) B Schett (Switzerland) P Schnyder
6	(South Africa) A Coetzer (Japan) A Sugiyama

=== Bottom half ===
First round
8	(Italy) R Grande (Russia) E Likhovtseva	2	7^{7}	7
(United States) A Frazier (United States) K Schlukebir	6	6^{4}	5
(Switzerland) E Gagliardi (Germany) M Weingärtner	6	2	6
(Australia) J Dokic (Russia) N Petrova	4	6	2
(Japan) R Hiraki (Japan) Y Yoshida	6	6^{5}	6
(United States) M Shaughnessy (United States) L Wild	2	7^{7}	3
5	(United States) C Rubin (France) S Testud	6	6
WC	(United States) H Parkinson (United States) B Rippner	1	2
(Romania) R Dragomir (Japan) N Miyagi	3	6	2
(Spain) V Ruano Pascual (Argentina) P Suárez	6	4	6
Q	(Slovakia) D Hantuchová (Slovenia) P Rampre	3	2
(Argentina) F Labat (Argentina) L Montalvo	6	6

Second round
8	(Italy) R Grande (Russia) E Likhovtseva	7^{7}	6
(Switzerland) E Gagliardi (Germany) M Weingärtner	6^{2}	2
(Japan) R Hiraki (Japan) Y Yoshida	4	6	0
3	(Spain) C Martínez (Spain) A Sánchez Vicario	6	2	6
5	(United States) C Rubin (France) S Testud	3	6	r
(Spain) V Ruano Pascual (Argentina) P Suárez	6	4
(Argentina) F Labat (Argentina) L Montalvo	2	4
2	(United States) L Raymond (Australia) R Stubbs	6	6

Quarterfinals
8	(Italy) R Grande (Russia) E Likhovtseva	1	3
3	(Spain) C Martínez (Spain) A Sánchez Vicario	6	6
(Spain) V Ruano Pascual (Argentina) P Suárez	2	6	6
2	(United States) L Raymond (Australia) R Stubbs	6	4	4

Semifinals
3	(Spain) C Martínez (Spain) A Sánchez Vicario
(Spain) V Ruano Pascual (Argentina) P Suárez
