= 2003 Bausch & Lomb Championships – Doubles =

Doubles
- 2003 Bausch & Lomb Championships

Final
- Champion: (United States) Lindsay Davenport (United States) Lisa Raymond
- Runner-up: (Spain) Virginia Ruano Pascual (Argentina) Paola Suárez
- Score: 7–5, 6–2

Events
Singles	Doubles
← 2002 ·	Amelia Island Championships	· 2004 →

Daniela Hantuchová and Arantxa Sánchez Vicario were the defending champions, but Sánchez Vicario chose not to compete in 2003. Hantuchová played with Dája Bedáňová, but lost in the first round.

Lindsay Davenport and Lisa Raymond won the title.

== Seeds ==
1. (Spain) Virginia Ruano Pascual / (Argentina) Paola Suárez (final)
2. (United States) Lindsay Davenport / (United States) Lisa Raymond (champions)
3. (Serbia and Montenegro) Jelena Dokić / (Australia) Rennae Stubbs (quarterfinals)
4. (Zimbabwe) Cara Black / (Russia) Elena Likhovtseva (quarterfinals)

== Results ==
Key

- Q = Qualifier
- WC = Wild card
- LL = Lucky loser
- Alt = Alternate
- ITF = ITF entry
- PR = Protected ranking
- SR = Special ranking
- SE = Special exempt
- JE = Junior exempt
- JR = Junior Accelerator Programme entrant
- CO = College Accelerator Programme entrant
- NG = Next Gen Accelerator Program entrant
- w/o = Walkover
- r = Retired
- d = Defaulted

=== Draw ===
First round
1	(Spain) V Ruano Pascual (Argentina) P Suárez	6	7
PR	(Canada) S Jeyaseelan (Slovenia) M Matevžič	4	5
WC	(United States) L Granville (United States) J Hopkins	4	2
(Belgium) E Callens (United States) M Navratilova	6	6
4	(Zimbabwe) C Black (Russia) E Likhovtseva	6	6
(Czech Republic) D Bedáňová (Slovakia) D Hantuchová	1	2
(South Africa) A Coetzer (South Africa) J Steck	4	2
LL	(Russia) A Jidkova (Japan) A Morigami	6	6
(Russia) E Dementieva (Russia) L Krasnoroutskaia	0	3
(United States) M Tu (Venezuela) M Vento-Kabchi	6	6
Q	(France) M Bartoli (Australia) E Dominikovic
3	(Serbia and Montenegro) J Dokić (Australia) R Stubbs	w/o
(United States) S Reeves (Venezuela) M Sequera	3	6	6
(Italy) T Garbin (Australia) N Pratt	6	3	1
WC	(United States) A Stevenson (United States) M Washington	1	1
2	(United States) L Davenport (United States) L Raymond	6	6

Quarterfinals
1	(Spain) V Ruano Pascual (Argentina) P Suárez	5	6	6
(Belgium) E Callens (United States) M Navratilova	7	2	3
4	(Zimbabwe) C Black (Russia) E Likhovtseva	7	3	3
LL	(Russia) A Jidkova (Japan) A Morigami	5	6	6
(United States) M Tu (Venezuela) M Vento-Kabchi	3	7	7
3	(Serbia and Montenegro) J Dokić (Australia) R Stubbs	6	6^{9}	5
(United States) S Reeves (Venezuela) M Sequera	1	4
2	(United States) L Davenport (United States) L Raymond	6	6

Semifinals
1	(Spain) V Ruano Pascual (Argentina) P Suárez	6	6
LL	(Russia) A Jidkova (Japan) A Morigami	2	1
(United States) M Tu (Venezuela) M Vento-Kabchi	4	2
2	(United States) L Davenport (United States) L Raymond	6	6

Final
1	(Spain) V Ruano Pascual (Argentina) P Suárez	5	2
2	(United States) L Davenport (United States) L Raymond	7	6
