= 2004 Bausch & Lomb Championships =

- Date: 5 – 11 April
- Edition: 25th
- Category: WTA Tier II
- Draw: 56S / 16D
- Prize money: USD585,000
- Surface: Clay / outdoor
- Location: Amelia Island, Florida, U.S.
- Venue: Amelia Island Plantation

Champions

Singles
- (United States) Lindsay Davenport

Doubles
- (Russia) Nadia Petrova (United States) Meghann Shaughnessy
- Amelia Island Championships

The 2004 Bausch & Lomb Championships was a women's tennis tournament played on outdoor clay courts at the Racquet Park at the Amelia Island Plantation in Amelia Island, Florida, United States. It was classified as a Tier II event on the 2004 WTA Tour. It was the 25th edition of the event and took place from April 5 to 11, 2004. Lindsay Davenport won the singles title.

== Finals ==
=== Singles ===
(United States) Lindsay Davenport defeated (France) Amélie Mauresmo, 6–4, 6–4

=== Doubles ===
(Russia) Nadia Petrova / (United States) Meghann Shaughnessy defeated (Switzerland) Myriam Casanova / (Australia) Alicia Molik, 3–6, 6–2, 7–5
