= 2002 Bausch & Lomb Championships – Singles =

Singles
- 2002 Bausch & Lomb Championships

Final
- Champion: (United States) Venus Williams
- Runner-up: (Belgium) Justine Henin
- Score: 2–6, 7–5, 7–6^{(7–5)}

Details
- Draw: 56 (8 Q / 1 LL / 3 WC )
- Seeds: 16

Events
Singles	Doubles
- Amelia Island Championships

Amélie Mauresmo was the defending champion, but lost in second round to Anne Kremer.

Venus Williams won the title by defeating Justine Henin 2–6, 7–5, 7–6^{(7–5)} in the final.

== Seeds ==
The first eight seeds received a bye into the second round.

1. (United States) Venus Williams (champion)
2. (Belgium) Justine Henin (final)
3. (Federal Republic of Yugoslavia) Jelena Dokic (semifinals)
4. (France) Amélie Mauresmo (second round)
5. (France) Sandrine Testud (quarterfinals)
6. (Italy) Silvia Farina Elia (quarterfinals)
7. (United States) Meghann Shaughnessy (second round)
8. (Spain) Arantxa Sánchez Vicario (second round)
9. (Slovakia) Daniela Hantuchová (second round)
10. (Russia) Elena Dementieva (quarterfinals)
11. (South Africa) Amanda Coetzer (first round)
12. (United States) Lisa Raymond (first round)
13. (United States) Alexandra Stevenson (second round)
14. (Russia) Tatiana Panova (first round)
15. (Czech Republic) ~~Dája Bedáňová~~ (withdrew)
16. (Italy) Francesca Schiavone (second round)

== Draw ==
Key

- Q = Qualifier
- WC = Wild card
- LL = Lucky loser
- Alt = Alternate
- ITF = ITF entry
- PR = Protected ranking
- SR = Special ranking
- SE = Special exempt
- JE = Junior exempt
- JR = Junior Accelerator Programme entrant
- CO = College Accelerator Programme entrant
- NG = Next Gen Accelerator Program entrant
- w/o = Walkover
- r = Retired
- d = Defaulted

=== Finals ===
Quarterfinals
1	(United States) Venus Williams	6	6
(Argentina) Paola Suárez	3	1
(Luxembourg) Anne Kremer	7	6
5	(France) Sandrine Testud	5	1
10	(Russia) Elena Dementieva	6	6^{3}	1
3	(Federal Republic of Yugoslavia) Jelena Dokic	0	7^{7}	6
6	(Italy) Silvia Farina Elia	4	4
2	(Belgium) Justine Henin	6	6

Semifinals
1	(United States) Venus Williams	7	6
(Luxembourg) Anne Kremer	5	0
3	(Federal Republic of Yugoslavia) Jelena Dokic	2	1^{r}
2	(Belgium) Justine Henin	6	4

Final
1	(United States) Venus Williams	2	7	7^{7}
2	(Belgium) Justine Henin	6	5	6^{5}

=== Top half ===
==== Section 1 ====
First round
(United States) A Frazier	1	6	6
(Slovakia) H Nagyová	6	4	2
(Russia) A Myskina	4	6	6
Q	(Federal Republic of Yugoslavia) J Janković	6	3	3
Q	(Italy) An Serra Zanetti	4	7	2
13	(United States) A Stevenson	6	5	6
12	(United States) L Raymond	4	2
WC	(United States) J Craybas	6	6
Q	(United States) S Reeves	6^{5}	6	6
(Israel) A Smashnova	7^{7}	3	4
(Russia) A Kournikova	4	1
(Argentina) P Suárez	6	6

Second round
1	(United States) V Williams	6	7
(United States) A Frazier	1	5
(Russia) A Myskina	2	6	6
13	(United States) A Stevenson	6	0	2
WC	(United States) J Craybas	3	7^{7}	6
Q	(United States) S Reeves	6	6^{5}	3
(Argentina) P Suárez	6	1	6
7	(United States) M Shaughnessy	1	6	0

Third round
1	(United States) V Williams	6	7^{7}
(Russia) A Myskina	4	6^{5}
WC	(United States) J Craybas	0	0
(Argentina) P Suárez	6	6

Quarterfinals
1	(United States) V Williams	6	6
(Argentina) P Suárez	3	1

==== Section 2 ====
First round
(Luxembourg) A Kremer	5	6	6
(United States) J Hopkins	7	4	2
(Colombia) F Zuluaga	6^{7}	0
(Russia) E Likhovtseva	7^{9}	6
(Australia) N Pratt	3	6	6
14	(Russia) T Panova	6	3	4
11	(South Africa) A Coetzer	2	1
(Croatia) I Majoli	6	6
(Spain) G León García	6	6^{5}	1
(Spain) C Martínez	4	7^{7}	6
(Italy) Ad Serra Zanetti	6^{3}	6^{6}
(Paraguay) R de los Ríos	7^{7}	7^{8}

Second round
4	(France) A Mauresmo	6	2	3
(Luxembourg) A Kremer	3	6	6
(Russia) E Likhovtseva	6	6
(Australia) N Pratt	4	0
(Croatia) I Majoli	6	4	2
(Spain) C Martínez	1	6	6
(Paraguay) R de los Ríos	1	4
5	(France) S Testud	6	6

Third round
(Luxembourg) A Kremer	6	3	6
(Russia) E Likhovtseva	4	6	2
(Spain) C Martínez	7	4	6^{6}
5	(France) S Testud	5	6	7^{8}

Quarterfinals
(Luxembourg) A Kremer	7	6
5	(France) S Testud	5	1

=== Bottom half ===
==== Section 3 ====
First round
(United States) M Irvin	5	4
(France) N Dechy	7	6
(Switzerland) P Schnyder	6	6
(Spain) V Ruano Pascual	1	0
WC	(United States) L Osterloh	6^{1}	3
10	(Russia) E Dementieva	7^{7}	6
LL	(Russia) A Jidkova	2	5
(Switzerland) E Gagliardi	6	7
(United States) M Tu	6	4
(Germany) M Weingärtner	4	0^{r}
WC	(France) M Pierce	6	6
Q	(Germany) V Henke	2	3

Second round
8	(Spain) A Sánchez Vicario	2	2
(France) N Dechy	6	6
(Switzerland) P Schnyder	4	5
10	(Russia) E Dementieva	6	7
(Switzerland) E Gagliardi	6	5	6
(United States) M Tu	4	7	4
WC	(France) M Pierce	2	0
3	(Federal Republic of Yugoslavia) J Dokic	6	6

Third round
(France) N Dechy	3	7^{7}	3
10	(Russia) E Dementieva	6	6^{5}	6
(Switzerland) E Gagliardi	3	4
3	(Federal Republic of Yugoslavia) J Dokic	6	6

Quarterfinals
10	(Russia) E Dementieva	6	6^{3}	1
3	(Federal Republic of Yugoslavia) J Dokic	0	7^{7}	6

==== Section 4 ====
First round
(Japan) A Sugiyama	2	2
(Australia) A Molik	6	6
(Slovakia) J Husárová	6	6
(Italy) R Grande	1	1
Q	(Australia) E Dominikovic	5	4
9	(Slovakia) D Hantuchová	7	6
16	(Italy) F Schiavone	7^{7}	6
Q	(Indonesia) W Prakusya	6^{5}	2
(Italy) T Garbin	6	3	6
(Spain) M Marrero	3	6	3
Q	(Ukraine) J Vakulenko	1	1
Q	(Argentina) C Fernández	6	6

Second round
6	(Italy) S Farina Elia	6	6
(Australia) A Molik	4	2
(Slovakia) J Husárová	6	3	6
9	(Slovakia) D Hantuchová	4	6	1
16	(Italy) F Schiavone	3	2
(Italy) T Garbin	6	6
Q	(Argentina) C Fernández	4	5
2	(Belgium) J Henin	6	7

Third round
6	(Italy) S Farina Elia	6
(Slovakia) J Husárová	2	r
(Italy) T Garbin	3	3
2	(Belgium) J Henin	6	6

Quarterfinals
6	(Italy) S Farina Elia	4	4
2	(Belgium) J Henin	6	6
