= 1999 Bausch & Lomb Championships – Singles =

Singles
- 1999 Bausch & Lomb Championships

Final
- Champion: (United States) Monica Seles
- Runner-up: (Romania) Ruxandra Dragomir
- Score: 6–2, 6–3

Details
- Draw: 56 (8 Q / 3 WC )
- Seeds: 16

Events
Singles	Doubles
← 1998 ·	Amelia Island Championships	· 2000 →

The 1999 Bausch & Lomb Championships singles was the singles event of the twentieth edition of the Bausch & Lomb Championships; a WTA Tier II tournament held in Amelia Island, Florida, United States, played on green clay. Mary Pierce was the defending champion but lost in the quarterfinals to Conchita Martínez.

Monica Seles won in the final 6–2, 6–3 against Ruxandra Dragomir.

== Seeds ==
The top eight seeds received a bye to the second round.

1. (United States) Lindsay Davenport (third round)
2. (United States) Monica Seles (champion)
3. (United States) Venus Williams (second round)
4. (France) Mary Pierce (quarterfinals)
5. (South Africa) Amanda Coetzer (quarterfinals)
6. (Switzerland) Patty Schnyder (quarterfinals)
7. (Spain) Conchita Martínez (semifinals)
8. (Austria) Barbara Schett (third round)
9. (Russia) Anna Kournikova (semifinals)
10. (United States) Chanda Rubin (third round)
11. (Spain) Magüi Serna (second round)
12. n/a
13. (United States) Lisa Raymond (second round)
14. (Spain) Virginia Ruano Pascual (third round)
15. (France) Nathalie Dechy (third round)
16. (Croatia) Iva Majoli (second round)
17. (United States) Corina Morariu (first round)

== Draw ==
=== Key ===
- Q = Qualifier
- WC = Wild card
- LL = Lucky loser
- Alt = Alternate
- SE = Special exempt
- PR = Protected ranking
- ITF = ITF entry
- JE = Junior exempt
- w/o = Walkover
- r = Retired
- d = Defaulted
- SR = Special ranking

=== Finals ===
Quarterfinals
9	(Russia) Anna Kournikova	6	6
6	(Switzerland) Patty Schnyder	0	2
(Colombia) Fabiola Zuluaga	3	1
(Romania) Ruxandra Dragomir	6	6
7	(Spain) Conchita Martínez	3	7	6
4	(France) Mary Pierce	6	6	2
5	(South Africa) Amanda Coetzer	3	0
2	(United States) Monica Seles	6	6

Semifinals
9	(Russia) Anna Kournikova	3	5
(Romania) Ruxandra Dragomir	6	7
7	(Spain) Conchita Martínez	0	1
2	(United States) Monica Seles	6	6

Final
(Romania) Ruxandra Dragomir	2	3
2	(United States) Monica Seles	6	6

=== Top half ===
==== Section 1 ====
First round
Q	(Slovenia) T Pisnik	6	1	6
(United States) B Rippner	3	6	3
(Austria) S Plischke	5	3
(United States) J Capriati	7	6
LL	(Russia) E Kulikovskaya	1	5
9	(Russia) A Kournikova	6	7
16	(Croatia) I Majoli	7	6
Q	(Federal Republic of Yugoslavia) S Naćuk	5	3
Q	(Canada) J Nejedly	3	1
WC	(Argentina) I Gorrochategui	6	6
(United States) M Shaughnessy	5	6	1
WC	(South Africa) J Steck	7	3	6

Second round
1	(United States) L Davenport	7	6
Q	(Slovenia) T Pisnik	5	3
(United States) J Capriati	3	3
9	(Russia) A Kournikova	6	6
16	(Croatia) I Majoli	6	4	2
WC	(Argentina) I Gorrochategui	3	6	6
WC	(South Africa) J Steck	1	1
6	(Switzerland) P Schnyder	6	6

Third round
1	(United States) L Davenport	4	1
9	(Russia) A Kournikova	6	6
WC	(Argentina) I Gorrochategui	5	2
6	(Switzerland) P Schnyder	7	6

Quarterfinals
9	(Russia) A Kournikova	6	6
6	(Switzerland) P Schnyder	0	2

==== Section 2 ====
First round
Q	(Canada) S Jeyaseelan	3	6	6
(Spain) G León García	6	2	2
(Colombia) F Zuluaga	6	6
(Croatia) M Lučić	4	1
(Latvia) L Neiland	6	1	4
15	(United States) L Raymond	3	6	6
11	(Spain) M Serna	6	6
Q	(Argentina) M-J Gaidano	3	2
Q	(Russia) N Petrova	2	2
(Romania) R Dragomir	6	6
(Venezuela) M Vento	2	6
(Greece) C Papadáki	6	7

Second round
3	(United States) V Williams	4	6^{6}
Q	(Canada) S Jeyaseelan	6	7^{8}
(Colombia) F Zuluaga	6	5	6
15	(United States) L Raymond	2	7	0
12	(Spain) M Serna	2	2
(Romania) R Dragomir	6	6
(Greece) C Papadáki	3	3
8	(Austria) B Schett	6	6

Third round
Q	(Canada) S Jeyaseelan	4	2
(Colombia) F Zuluaga	6	6
(Romania) R Dragomir	6	6
8	(Austria) B Schett	2	2

Quarterfinals
(Colombia) F Zuluaga	3	1
(Romania) R Dragomir	6	6

=== Bottom half ===
==== Section 3 ====
First round
(United States) T Snyder	6	6
Q	(Paraguay) L Schaerer	2	4
(Thailand) T Tanasugarn	1	2
(Puerto Rico) K Brandi	6	6
(Australia) N Pratt	2	1
10	(United States) C Rubin	6	6
15	(France) N Dechy	6	6
WC	(United States) M Tu	2	3
(Ukraine) E Tatarkova	6	7
(Canada) M Drake	4	5
LL	(United States) A Stevenson	3	0
(Romania) C Cristea	6	6

Second round
7	(Spain) C Martínez	6	6
(United States) T Snyder	1	2
(Puerto Rico) K Brandi	1	3
10	(United States) C Rubin	6	6
15	(France) N Dechy	6	6
(Ukraine) E Tatarkova	1	3
(Romania) C Cristea	0	0
4	(France) M Pierce	6	6

Third round
7	(Spain) C Martínez	7^{8}	5	6
10	(United States) C Rubin	6^{6}	7	2
15	(France) N Dechy	6	4	3
4	(France) M Pierce	2	6	6

Quarterfinals
7	(Spain) C Martínez	3	7^{7}	6
4	(France) M Pierce	6	6^{4}	2

==== Section 4 ====
First round
(United States) L Osterloh	4	6	6
(Spain) M Sánchez Lorenzo	6	1	4
(France) A-G Sidot	6^{4}	6^{5}
(Russia) T Panova	7^{7}	7^{7}
(United States) S Cacic	2	1
14	(Spain) V Ruano Pascual	6	6
17	(United States) C Morariu	3	4
(France) A Fusai	6	6
Q	(Switzerland) E Gagliardi	5	1
(Israel) A Smashnova	7	6
(Germany) B Rittner	6	3	5
(Czech Republic) K Hrdličková	4	6	7

Second round
5	(South Africa) A Coetzer	6	6
(United States) L Osterloh	4	2
(Russia) T Panova	6^{0}	6	3
14	(Spain) V Ruano Pascual	7^{7}	4	6
(France) A Fusai	3	6	6
(Israel) A Smashnova	6	4	4
(Czech Republic) K Hrdličková	2	2
2	(United States) M Seles	6	6

Third round
5	(South Africa) A Coetzer	6	7
14	(Spain) V Ruano Pascual	1	5
(France) A Fusai	0	2
2	(United States) M Seles	6	6

Quarterfinals
5	(South Africa) A Coetzer	3	0
2	(United States) M Seles	6	6

== Qualifying ==
=== Seeds ===
1. (Canada) Jana Nejedly (qualifier)
2. (Switzerland) Emmanuelle Gagliardi (qualifier)
3. (United States) Alexandra Stevenson (qualifying competition, lucky loser)
4. (Federal Republic of Yugoslavia) Sandra Naćuk (qualifier)
5. (Russia) Evgenia Kulikovskaya (qualifying competition, lucky loser)
6. (Bulgaria) Pavlina Stoyanova (qualifying competition)
7. (United States) Karin Miller (first round)
8. (Russia) Nadia Petrova (qualifier)

=== Qualifiers ===
1. (Canada) Jana Nejedly
2. (Paraguay) Larissa Schaerer
3. (Federal Republic of Yugoslavia) Sandra Naćuk
4. (Canada) Sonya Jeyaseelan
5. (Slovenia) Tina Pisnik
6. (Argentina) María José Gaidano
7. (Russia) Nadia Petrova
8. (Switzerland) Emmanuelle Gagliardi

=== Lucky losers ===
1. (Russia) Evgenia Kulikovskaya
2. (United States) Alexandra Stevenson

== Qualifying draw ==
=== Key ===
- Q = Qualifier
- WC = Wild card
- LL = Lucky loser
- Alt = Alternate
- SE = Special exempt
- PR = Protected ranking
- ITF = ITF entry
- JE = Junior exempt
- w/o = Walkover
- r = Retired
- d = Defaulted
- SR = Special ranking

=== First qualifier ===
First round
1	(Canada) Jana Nejedly
Bye
(United Kingdom) Joanne Moore	6	6
(Japan) Keiko Ishida	4	1

Qualifying competition
1	(Canada) Jana Nejedly	6	6
(United Kingdom) Joanne Moore	2	2

=== Second qualifier ===
First round
(Japan) Keiko Nagatomi	1	2
(Paraguay) Larissa Schaerer	6	6
(Poland) Aleksandra Olsza	6	6
7	(United States) Karin Miller	3	1

Qualifying competition
(Paraguay) Larissa Schaerer	6	7^{7}
(Poland) Aleksandra Olsza	1	6^{5}

=== Third qualifier ===
First round
4	(Federal Republic of Yugoslavia) Sandra Naćuk
Bye
(Russia) Elena Makarova	6	6
(United States) Lindsay Lee	2	4

Qualifying competition
4	(Federal Republic of Yugoslavia) Sandra Naćuk	6	6
(Russia) Elena Makarova	3	3

=== Fourth qualifier ===
First round
(Canada) Sonya Jeyaseelan	3	6	6
(Slovenia) Tina Križan	6	2	3
Bye
5	(Russia) Evgenia Kulikovskaya

Qualifying competition
(Canada) Sonya Jeyaseelan	6	6
5	(Russia) Evgenia Kulikovskaya	4	1

=== Fifth qualifier ===
First round
6	(Bulgaria) Pavlina Stoyanova	3	6	6
(United States) Katie Schlukebir	6	2	3
(Slovenia) Tina Pisnik	6	6
(United States) Eleni Rossides	0	1

Qualifying competition
6	(Bulgaria) Pavlina Stoyanova	3	4
(Slovenia) Tina Pisnik	6	6

=== Sixth qualifier ===
First round
(Argentina) María José Gaidano	6^{4}	6	6
(Slovakia) Radka Zrubáková	7^{7}	3	1
Bye
3	(United States) Alexandra Stevenson

Qualifying competition
(Argentina) María José Gaidano	6	6
3	(United States) Alexandra Stevenson	1	4

=== Seventh qualifier ===
First round
8	(Russia) Nadia Petrova	6	6
(United States) Samantha Reeves	1	2
(United States) Tracy Singian	4	3
(United States) Lauren Nikolaus-Zink	6	6

Qualifying competition
8	(Russia) Nadia Petrova	7	6
(United States) Lauren Nikolaus-Zink	5	1

=== Eighth qualifier ===
First round
(United States) Jill Craybas	6	6
(United States) Trina Singian	2	0
Bye
2	(Switzerland) Emmanuelle Gagliardi

Qualifying competition
(United States) Jill Craybas	1	2
2	(Switzerland) Emmanuelle Gagliardi	6	6
