= 2001 Bausch & Lomb Championships =

- Date: April 9–15
- Edition: 22nd
- Category: Tier II
- Surface: Clay / outdoor
- Location: Amelia Island, Florida, U.S.
- Venue: Amelia Island Plantation

Champions

Singles
- (France) Amélie Mauresmo

Doubles
- (Spain) Conchita Martínez (Argentina) Patricia Tarabini
← 2000 ·	Amelia Island Championships	· 2002 →

The 2001 Bausch & Lomb Championships was a women's tennis tournament played on outdoor clay courts at the Amelia Island Plantation on Amelia Island, Florida in the United States and was part of Tier II of the 2001 WTA Tour. The tournament ran from April 9 through April 15, 2001. Sixth-seeded Amélie Mauresmo won the singles title.

== Finals ==
=== Singles ===
(France) Amélie Mauresmo defeated (South Africa) Amanda Coetzer 6–4, 7–5

- It was Mauresmo's 3rd title of the year and the 6th of her career.

=== Doubles ===
(Spain) Conchita Martínez / (Argentina) Patricia Tarabini defeated (United States) Martina Navratilova / (Spain) Arantxa Sánchez-Vicario 6–4, 6–2

- It was Martínez's only title of the year and the 42nd of her career. It was Tarabini's 1st title of the year and the 14th of her career.
