= 2004 Bausch & Lomb Championships – Singles =

Singles
- 2004 Bausch & Lomb Championships

Final
- Champion: (United States) Lindsay Davenport
- Runner-up: (France) Amélie Mauresmo
- Score: 6–4, 6–4

Details
- Draw: 56 (4 Q / 4 WC )
- Seeds: 16

Events
Singles	Doubles
- Amelia Island Championships

Elena Dementieva was the defending champion, but lost in second round to Jelena Kostanić.

Lindsay Davenport won the title by defeating Amélie Mauresmo 6–4, 6–4 in the final. It was the second title in the year for Davenport and the 40th title of her career.

== Seeds ==
The first eight seeds received a bye into the second round.

1. (Belgium) Justine Henin-Hardenne (semifinals)
2. (United States) Serena Williams (quarterfinals)
3. (France) Amélie Mauresmo (final)
4. (United States) Lindsay Davenport (champion)
5. (Russia) Elena Dementieva (second round)
6. (Japan) Ai Sugiyama (third round)
7. (Russia) Nadia Petrova (semifinals)
8. (Russia) Vera Zvonareva (quarterfinals)
9. (Argentina) Paola Suárez (quarterfinals)
10. (Italy) Silvia Farina Elia (quarterfinals)
11. (Serbia and Montenegro) Jelena Dokic (first round)
12. (Switzerland) Patty Schnyder (third round)
13. (Israel) Anna Smashnova-Pistolesi (second round)
14. (Italy) Francesca Schiavone (first round)
15. (Bulgaria) Magdalena Maleeva (second round)
16. (Spain) Conchita Martínez (third round)

== Draw ==
Key

- Q = Qualifier
- WC = Wild card
- LL = Lucky loser
- Alt = Alternate
- ITF = ITF entry
- PR = Protected ranking
- SR = Special ranking
- SE = Special exempt
- JE = Junior exempt
- JR = Junior Accelerator Programme entrant
- CO = College Accelerator Programme entrant
- NG = Next Gen Accelerator Program entrant
- w/o = Walkover
- r = Retired
- d = Defaulted

=== Finals ===
Quarterfinals
1	(Belgium) Justine Henin-Hardenne	6	6
8	(Russia) Vera Zvonareva	4	3
3	(France) Amélie Mauresmo	6	6
10	(Italy) Silvia Farina Elia	4	3
9	(Argentina) Paola Suárez	4	1
4	(United States) Lindsay Davenport	6	6
7	(Russia) Nadia Petrova	6	6
2/PR	(United States) Serena Williams	2	3

Semifinals
1	(Belgium) Justine Henin-Hardenne	7^{7}	5	3
3	(France) Amélie Mauresmo	6^{4}	7	6
4	(United States) Lindsay Davenport	3	6	6
7	(Russia) Nadia Petrova	6	4	1

Final
3	(France) Amélie Mauresmo	4	4
4	(United States) Lindsay Davenport	6	6

=== Top half ===
==== Section 1 ====
First round
(Thailand) T Tanasugarn	1	3
(Russia) D Safina	6	6
(Spain) A Medina Garrigues	6	6
(United States) J Craybas	4	2
(Russia) L Krasnoroutskaya	6	5	1
16	(Spain) C Martínez	3	7	6
12	(Switzerland) P Schnyder	7	4	6
(Luxembourg) C Schaul	5	6	1
WC	(Switzerland) M-G Mikaelian	6	2	6
(China) J Zheng	1	6	3
PR	(Luxembourg) A Kremer	2	4
(Slovenia) T Pisnik	6	6

Second round
1	(Belgium) J Henin-Hardenne	6	7^{8}
(Russia) D Safina	4	6^{6}
(Spain) A Medina Garrigues	3	4
16	(Spain) C Martínez	6	6
12	(Switzerland) P Schnyder	6	6
WC	(Switzerland) M-G Mikaelian	1	0
(Slovenia) T Pisnik	3	6	5
8	(Russia) V Zvonareva	6	1	7

Third round
1	(Belgium) J Henin-Hardenne	2	7	6
16	(Spain) C Martínez	6	5	3
12	(Switzerland) P Schnyder	2	3
8	(Russia) V Zvonareva	6	6

Quarterfinals
1	(Belgium) J Henin-Hardenne	6	6
8	(Russia) V Zvonareva	4	3

==== Section 2 ====
First round
(Venezuela) M Vento-Kabchi	4	1
(Japan) A Morigami	6	6
Q	(Czech Republic) B Strýcová	7^{7}	6
(Hungary) M Czink	6^{1}	1
WC	(United States) J Hopkins	0	0
13	(Israel) A Smashnova-Pistolesi	6	6
10	(Italy) S Farina Elia	6	6
(Russia) E Likhovtseva	4	4
(Spain) V Ruano Pascual	6	6
(United States) L Granville	1	3
(Croatia) J Kostanić	6	6
(Germany) M Weingärtner	4	2

Second round
3	(France) A Mauresmo	6	6
(Japan) A Morigami	0	3
Q	(Czech Republic) B Strýcová	2	6	7^{7}
13	(Israel) A Smashnova-Pistolesi	6	4	6^{1}
10	(Italy) S Farina Elia	6	6
(Spain) V Ruano Pascual	1	1
(Croatia) J Kostanić	7^{7}	1
5	(Russia) E Dementieva	6^{5}	0^{r}

Third round
3	(France) A Mauresmo	6	6
Q	(Czech Republic) B Strýcová	3	4
10	(Italy) S Farina Elia	6	6
(Croatia) J Kostanić	2	2

Quarterfinals
3	(France) A Mauresmo	6	6
10	(Italy) S Farina Elia	4	3

=== Bottom half ===
==== Section 3 ====
First round
Q	(Colombia) C Castaño	6	6
PR	(Argentina) M Díaz Oliva	3	3
(Japan) S Asagoe	6	7
(United States) S Reeves	3	5
LL	(Italy) M Santangelo	2	3
9	(Argentina) P Suárez	6	6
14	(Italy) F Schiavone	6	6^{4}	0
(Spain) A Parra Santonja	1	7^{7}	6
(Australia) A Molik	6	6
(Serbia and Montenegro) J Janković	0	0
Q	(China) T Sun	7^{10}	6
(Zimbabwe) C Black	6^{8}	3

Second round
6	(Japan) A Sugiyama	7	6
Q	(Colombia) C Castaño	5	4
(Japan) S Asagoe	4	3
9	(Argentina) P Suárez	6	6
(Spain) A Parra Santonja	3	4
(Australia) A Molik	6	6
Q	(China) T Sun	2	5
4	(United States) L Davenport	6	7

Third round
6	(Japan) A Sugiyama	5	6^{8}
9	(Argentina) P Suárez	7	7^{10}
(Australia) A Molik	4	5
4	(United States) L Davenport	6	7

Quarterfinals
9	(Argentina) P Suárez	4	1
4	(United States) L Davenport	6	6

==== Section 4 ====
First round
WC	(United States) M Navratilova	6	3	2
LL	(Venezuela) M Sequera	1	6	6
(Hungary) P Mandula	6	6
(Germany) A Barna	2	3
(United States) A Frazier	6	7
11	(Serbia and Montenegro) J Dokic	4	5
15	(Bulgaria) M Maleeva	6	6^{4}	6
Q	(Madagascar) D Randriantefy	4	7^{7}	3
(Croatia) K Šprem	6	6
WC	(United States) M Irvin	3	2
(United States) M Shaughnessy	1	2
(France) M Pierce	6	6

Second round
7	(Russia) N Petrova	6	6
LL	(Venezuela) M Sequera	1	0
(Hungary) P Mandula	7^{7}	7^{7}
(United States) A Frazier	6^{1}	6^{3}
15	(Bulgaria) M Maleeva	2	4
(Croatia) K Šprem	6	6
(France) M Pierce	3	1
2/PR	(United States) S Williams	6	6

Third round
7	(Russia) N Petrova	6	6
(Hungary) P Mandula	1	4
(Croatia) K Šprem	1	5
2/PR	(United States) S Williams	6	7

Quarterfinals
7	(Russia) N Petrova	6	6
2/PR	(United States) S Williams	2	3
