= 2004 Bausch & Lomb Championships – Doubles =

Doubles
- 2004 Bausch & Lomb Championships

Final
- Champions: (Russia) Nadia Petrova (United States) Meghann Shaughnessy
- Runners-up: (Switzerland) Myriam Casanova (Australia) Alicia Molik
- Score: 3–6, 6–2, 7–5

Details
- Draw: 16 (1 Q / 2 WC )
- Seeds: 4

Events
Singles	Doubles
← 2003 ·	Amelia Island Championships	· 2005 →

Lindsay Davenport and Lisa Raymond were the defending champions, but Raymond did not compete this year. Davenport teamed up with Corina Morariu and were eliminated in first round.

Nadia Petrova and Meghann Shaughnessy won the title by defeating Myriam Casanova and Alicia Molik 3–6, 6–2, 7–5 in the final. It was the 6th title for both players in their respective doubles careers. It was also the 2nd title for the pair during the season, after their win in Miami.

== Seeds ==
1. (Spain) Virginia Ruano Pascual / (Argentina) Paola Suárez (semifinals)
2. (South Africa) Liezel Huber / (United States) Martina Navratilova (first round)
3. (Zimbabwe) Cara Black / (Australia) Rennae Stubbs (first round)
4. (Russia) Elena Likhovtseva / (Spain) Conchita Martínez (first round)

== Draw ==
=== Key ===
- Q = Qualifier
- WC = Wild card
- LL = Lucky loser
- Alt = Alternate
- SE = Special exempt
- PR = Protected ranking
- ITF = ITF entry
- JE = Junior exempt
- w/o = Walkover
- r = Retired
- d = Defaulted
- SR = Special ranking

=== Draw ===
First round
1	(Spain) V Ruano Pascual (Argentina) P Suárez	6	7
Q	(China) Z Yan (China) J Zheng	1	5
WC	(France) N Dechy (France) A Mauresmo	6	7^{7}
(Japan) S Asagoe (China) T Sun	4	6^{4}
4	(Russia) E Likhovtseva (Spain) C Martínez	6	3	6^{1}
(Croatia) J Kostanić (Ukraine) T Perebiynis	1	6	7^{7}
(Greece) E Daniilidou (Venezuela) M Vento-Kabchi	1	2
(Russia) N Petrova (United States) M Shaughnessy	6	6
WC	(Slovenia) T Pisnik (Croatia) K Šprem	7	6^{4}	3
(Russia) L Krasnoroutskaya (Russia) V Zvonareva	5	7^{7}	6
(Hungary) P Mandula (United States) M Tu	6	6
3	(Zimbabwe) C Black (Australia) R Stubbs	4	2
(Switzerland) M Casanova (Australia) A Molik	5	6	1
(United States) L Davenport (United States) C Morariu	7	3	0^{r}
(Italy) S Farina Elia (Italy) F Schiavone	6	2	6
2	(South Africa) L Huber (United States) M Navratilova	2	6	3

Quarterfinals
1	(Spain) V Ruano Pascual (Argentina) P Suárez	6^{7}	6	6
WC	(France) N Dechy (France) A Mauresmo	7^{9}	2	2
(Croatia) J Kostanić (Ukraine) T Perebiynis	6^{3}	2
(Russia) N Petrova (United States) M Shaughnessy	7^{7}	6
(Russia) L Krasnoroutskaya (Russia) V Zvonareva	6	6
(Hungary) P Mandula (United States) M Tu	2	1
(Switzerland) M Casanova (Australia) A Molik	7	7
(Italy) S Farina Elia (Italy) F Schiavone	5	5

Semifinals
1	(Spain) V Ruano Pascual (Argentina) P Suárez	2	6	3
(Russia) N Petrova (United States) M Shaughnessy	6	2	6
(Russia) L Krasnoroutskaya (Russia) V Zvonareva	3	6^{2}
(Switzerland) M Casanova (Australia) A Molik	6	7^{7}

Final
(Russia) N Petrova (United States) M Shaughnessy	3	6	7
(Switzerland) M Casanova (Australia) A Molik	6	2	5
