= 2000 Bausch & Lomb Championships =

- Date: April 10 – 16
- Edition: 21st
- Category: Tier II
- Draw: 56S / 28D
- Prize money: $535,000
- Surface: Clay / outdoor
- Location: Amelia Island, Florida, U.S.
- Venue: Amelia Island Plantation

Champions

Singles
- (United States) Monica Seles

Doubles
- No champions declared
← 1999 ·	Amelia Island Championships	· 2001 →

The 2000 Bausch & Lomb Championships was a women's tennis tournament played on outdoor clay courts at the Amelia Island Plantation on Amelia Island, Florida in the United States that was part of Tier II of the 2000 WTA Tour. It was the 21st edition of the tournament and was held from April 10 through April 16, 2000. Monica Seles won the singles title.

== Finals ==
=== Singles ===
(United States) Monica Seles defeated (Spain) Conchita Martínez 6–3, 6–2

- It was Seles' 2nd title of the year and the 46th of her career.

=== Doubles ===
- The doubles event was cancelled at the semifinal stage due to bad weather
