= 2003 Bausch & Lomb Championships – Singles =

Singles
- 2003 Bausch & Lomb Championships

Final
- Champion: (Russia) Elena Dementieva
- Runner-up: (United States) Lindsay Davenport
- Score: 4–6, 7–5, 6–3

Details
- Draw: 56 (4 Q / 4 WC )
- Seeds: 16

Events
Singles	Doubles
- Amelia Island Championships

Venus Williams was the defending champion, but she did not compete in 2003.

Elena Dementieva won the title by defeating Lindsay Davenport in the final in three sets. It was her first WTA Tour title.

== Seeds ==
1. (Belgium) Justine Henin (semifinals)
2. (United States) Lindsay Davenport (final)
3. (United States) Jennifer Capriati (semifinals)
4. (Slovakia) Daniela Hantuchová (quarterfinals)
5. (Serbia and Montenegro) Jelena Dokić (third round)
6. (United States) Monica Seles (quarterfinals)
7. (Switzerland) Patty Schnyder (quarterfinals)
8. (South Africa) Amanda Coetzer (third round)
9. (United States) Meghann Shaughnessy (third round)
10. (Russia) Elena Dementieva (winner)
11. (France) Nathalie Dechy (third round)
12. (United States) Lisa Raymond (quarterfinals)
13. (Spain) Conchita Martínez (withdrew)
14. (Argentina) Clarisa Fernández (third round)
15. (Argentina) Paola Suárez (third round)
16. (United States) Alexandra Stevenson (third round)

== Draw ==
Key

- Q = Qualifier
- WC = Wild card
- LL = Lucky loser
- Alt = Alternate
- ITF = ITF entry
- PR = Protected ranking
- SR = Special ranking
- SE = Special exempt
- JE = Junior exempt
- JR = Junior Accelerator Programme entrant
- CO = College Accelerator Programme entrant
- NG = Next Gen Accelerator Program entrant
- w/o = Walkover
- r = Retired
- d = Defaulted

=== Finals ===
Quarterfinals
1	(Belgium) Justine Henin-Hardenne	6	6
6	(United States) Monica Seles	2	4
4	(Slovakia) Daniela Hantuchová	0	1
10	(Russia) Elena Dementieva	6	6
12	(United States) Lisa Raymond	2	0
3	(United States) Jennifer Capriati	6	6
7	(Switzerland) Patty Schnyder	1	1
2	(United States) Lindsay Davenport	6	6

Semifinals
1	(Belgium) Justine Henin-Hardenne	6	4	5
10	(Russia) Elena Dementieva	3	6	7
3	(United States) Jennifer Capriati	3	7	2
2	(United States) Lindsay Davenport	6	5	6

Final
10	(Russia) Elena Dementieva	4	7	6
2	(United States) Lindsay Davenport	6	5	3

=== Top half ===
==== Section 1 ====
First round
(Madagascar) D Randriantefy	6	6
(United States) S Taylor	4	4
Q	(Venezuela) M Sequera	6	2	2
(United States) J Craybas	3	6	6
Q	(Venezuela) M Vento-Kabchi	7	6
(France) M Bartoli	5	0
(Uzbekistan) I Tulyaganova	0	5
(Germany) A Barna	6	7

Second round
1	(Belgium) J Henin-Hardenne	6	6
(Madagascar) D Randriantefy	3	0
(United States) J Craybas	7	4	2
14	(Argentina) C Fernández	6^{6}	6	6
11	(France) N Dechy	7	4	7
Q	(Venezuela) M Vento-Kabchi	5	6	5
(Germany) A Barna	6	6^{5}	3
6	(United States) M Seles	2	7	6

Third round
1	(Belgium) J Henin-Hardenne	w/o
14	(Argentina) C Fernández
11	(France) N Dechy	1	2
6	(United States) M Seles	6	6

Quarterfinals
1	(Belgium) J Henin-Hardenne	6	6
6	(United States) M Seles	2	4

==== Section 2 ====
First round
Q	(Japan) A Morigami	6	6
(Australia) E Dominikovic	2	2
(Zimbabwe) C Black	7	6^{5}	2
(Belgium) E Callens	6^{10}	7	6
(Russia) T Panova	6	2	2
(Russia) L Krasnoroutskaia	4	6	6
(Russia) V Zvonareva	6^{3}	6	6
(United States) L Granville	7	3	1

Second round
4	(Slovakia) D Hantuchová	7	6
Q	(Japan) A Morigami	5	2
(Belgium) E Callens	5	3
16	(United States) A Stevenson	7	6
10	(Russia) E Dementieva	6	7
(Russia) L Krasnoroutskaia	1	5
(Russia) V Zvonareva	5	6	0
8	(South Africa) A Coetzer	7	4	6

Third round
4	(Slovakia) D Hantuchová	6	3	6
16	(United States) A Stevenson	4	6	2
10	(Russia) E Dementieva	7	6
8	(South Africa) A Coetzer	6^{2}	3

Quarterfinals
4	(Slovakia) D Hantuchová	0	1
10	(Russia) E Dementieva	6	6

=== Bottom half ===
==== Section 3 ====
First round
WC	(United States) J Hopkins	7	6^{6}	1
(Slovenia) T Pisnik	6^{2}	7	6
Q	(Ukraine) J Vakulenko	6	6
(United States) A Frazier	2	4
(France) S Foretz	1	2
(Russia) E Likhovtseva	6	6
(Czech Republic) D Bedáňová	3	4
(Switzerland) M-G Mikaelian	6	6

Second round
5	(Serbia and Montenegro) J Dokić	7	5	6
(Slovenia) T Pisnik	5	7	1
Q	(Ukraine) J Vakulenko	1	6	1
12	(United States) L Raymond	6	3	6
15	(Argentina) P Suárez	4	7	6
(Russia) E Likhovtseva	6	5	3
(Switzerland) M-G Mikaelian	4	6^{5}
3	(United States) J Capriati	6	7

Third round
5	(Serbia and Montenegro) J Dokić	3	7	2
12	(United States) L Raymond	6	6^{4}	6
15	(Argentina) P Suárez	6	2	5
3	(United States) J Capriati	2	6	7

Quarterfinals
12	(United States) L Raymond	2	0
3	(United States) J Capriati	6	6

==== Section 4 ====
First round
(United States) M Tu	6	5	6^{4}
(Slovenia) M Matevžič	4	7	7
(Spain) V Ruano Pascual	6	7
LL	(Russia) A Jidkova	2	5
WC	(United States) S Perry	6	5	2
(Italy) T Garbin	4	7	6
WC	(United States) B Bielik	6	5	0
(Australia) N Pratt	2	7	6

Second round
7	(Switzerland) P Schnyder	6	4
(Slovenia) M Matevžič	1	1	r
(Spain) V Ruano Pascual	2	3
9	(United States) M Shaughnessy	6	6
LL	(Germany) M Weingärtner	6	5	7
(Italy) T Garbin	4	7	5
(Australia) N Pratt	1	0
2	(United States) L Davenport	6	6

Third round
7	(Switzerland) P Schnyder	6	4	6
9	(United States) M Shaughnessy	2	6	2
LL	(Germany) M Weingärtner	1	1
2	(United States) L Davenport	6	6

Quarterfinals
7	(Switzerland) P Schnyder	1	1
2	(United States) L Davenport	6	6
