= 2001 Bausch & Lomb Championships – Doubles =

Doubles
- 2001 Bausch & Lomb Championships

Final
- Champions: (Spain) Conchita Martínez (Argentina) Patricia Tarabini
- Runners-up: (United States) Martina Navratilova (Spain) Arantxa Sánchez-Vicario
- Score: 6–4, 6–2

Details
- Draw: 16 (1 Q / 1 WC )
- Seeds: 4

Events
Singles	Doubles
← 2000 ·	Amelia Island Championships	· 2002 →

Conchita Martínez and Patricia Tarabini won in the final 6–4, 6–2 against Martina Navratilova and Arantxa Sánchez-Vicario.

== Seeds ==
Champion seeds are indicated in bold text while text in italics indicates the round in which those seeds were eliminated.

1. (United States) Lisa Raymond / (Australia) Rennae Stubbs (semifinals)
2. (Spain) Virginia Ruano Pascual / (Argentina) Paola Suárez (quarterfinals)
3. (Sweden) Åsa Carlsson / (United States) Kimberly Po (quarterfinals)
4. (Russia) Elena Likhovtseva / (Australia) Nicole Pratt (first round)

== Draw ==
=== Key ===
- Q = Qualifier
- WC = Wild card
- LL = Lucky loser
- Alt = Alternate
- SE = Special exempt
- PR = Protected ranking
- ITF = ITF entry
- JE = Junior exempt
- w/o = Walkover
- r = Retired
- d = Defaulted
- SR = Special ranking

First round
1	(United States) **L Raymond** (Australia) **R Stubbs**	**6**	**6**
(United States) A Frazier (United States) K Schlukebir	4	1
WC	(Russia) **E Dementieva** (Federal Republic of Yugoslavia) **J Dokić**	**6**	2	**7**
(United States) M Shaughnessy (Netherlands) C Vis	1	**6**	5
3	(Sweden) **Å Carlsson** (United States) **K Po**	**6**	4	**7^{7}**
(United States) E deLone (Canada) S Jeyaseelan	3	**6**	6^{3}
(Romania) R Dragomir Ilie (Italy) S Farina Elia	**6**	1	3
(Spain) **C Martínez** (Argentina) **P Tarabini**	4	**6**	**6**
(France) N Dechy (United States) C Rubin	6^{2}	3
Q	(Argentina) **M Díaz Oliva** (Germany) **M Weingärtner**	**7^{7}**	**6**
(South Africa) **A Coetzer** (United States) **L McNeil**	4	**6**	**6**
4	(Russia) E Likhovtseva (Australia) N Pratt	**6**	2	2
LL	(United States) K Brandi (United States) J Craybas	1	2
(United States) **M Navratilova** (Spain) **A Sánchez-Vicario**	**6**	**6**
(South Africa) L Huber (Argentina) L Montalvo	2	1
2	(Spain) **V Ruano Pascual** (Argentina) **P Suárez**	**6**	**6**

Quarterfinals
1	(United States) **L Raymond** (Australia) **R Stubbs**	**7**	**6**
WC	(Russia) E Dementieva (Federal Republic of Yugoslavia) J Dokić	5	2
3	(Sweden) Å Carlsson (United States) K Po	5	**6**	4
(Spain) **C Martínez** (Argentina) **P Tarabini**	**7**	3	**6**
Q	(Argentina) M Díaz Oliva (Germany) M Weingärtner	4	3
(South Africa) **A Coetzer** (United States) **L McNeil**	**6**	**6**
(United States) **M Navratilova** (Spain) **A Sánchez-Vicario**	**7^{7}**	1	**6**
2	(Spain) V Ruano Pascual (Argentina) P Suárez	6^{5}	**6**	1

Semifinals
1	(United States) L Raymond (Australia) R Stubbs	4	**6**	3
(Spain) **C Martínez** (Argentina) **P Tarabini**	**6**	3	**6**
(South Africa) A Coetzer (United States) L McNeil	4	5
(United States) **M Navratilova** (Spain) **A Sánchez-Vicario**	**6**	**7**

Final
(Spain) **Conchita Martínez** (Argentina) **Patricia Tarabini**	**6**	**6**
(United States) Martina Navratilova (Spain) Arantxa Sánchez-Vicario	4	2
