= 2002 Bausch & Lomb Championships – Doubles =

Doubles
- 2002 Bausch & Lomb Championships

Final
- Champions: (Slovakia) Daniela Hantuchová (Spain) Arantxa Sánchez Vicario
- Runners-up: (Argentina) María Emilia Salerni (Sweden) Åsa Svensson
- Score: 6–4, 6–2

Details
- Draw: 16 (1 Q / 1 LL / 2 WC )
- Seeds: 4

Events
Singles	Doubles
← 2001 ·	Amelia Island Championships	· 2003 →

Conchita Martínez and Patricia Tarabini were the defending champions, but decided to compete this year with different partners.

Martínez, alongside her partner Jelena Dokic, decided to withdraw in order to focus on the singles competition.

Tarabini teamed up with Laura Montalvo and lost in first round to Elena Likhovtseva and Nicole Pratt.

Daniela Hantuchová and Arantxa Sánchez Vicario won the title by defeating María Emilia Salerni and Åsa Svensson 6–4, 6–2 in the final.

== Seeds ==
1. (United States) Lisa Raymond / (Australia) Rennae Stubbs (first round)
2. (Spain) Virginia Ruano Pascual / (Argentina) Paola Suárez (semifinals)
3. (Slovakia) Daniela Hantuchová / (Spain) Arantxa Sánchez Vicario (champions)
4. (Federal Republic of Yugoslavia) ~~Jelena Dokic~~ / (Spain) ~~Conchita Martínez~~ (withdrew)

== Draw ==
=== Key ===
- Q = Qualifier
- WC = Wild card
- LL = Lucky loser
- Alt = Alternate
- SE = Special exempt
- PR = Protected ranking
- ITF = ITF entry
- JE = Junior exempt
- w/o = Walkover
- r = Retired
- d = Defaulted
- SR = Special ranking

=== Draw ===
First round
1	(United States) L Raymond (Australia) R Stubbs	3	6	6^{5}
WC	(South Africa) A Coetzer (South Africa) J Steck	6	0	7^{7}
(Russia) E Dementieva (Slovakia) J Husárová	1	4
(Chinese Taipei) J Lee (Indonesia) W Prakusya	6	6
LL	(Argentina) ME Salerni (Sweden) Å Svensson	6	7
(Italy) R Grande (Czech Republic) K Hrdličková	4	5
(Russia) E Likhovtseva (Australia) N Pratt	6	6
(Argentina) L Montalvo (Argentina) P Tarabini	3	3
(Japan) A Sugiyama (Ukraine) E Tatarkova	6	3	6
(Belgium) J Henin (United States) M Shaughnessy	3	6	4
WC	(United States) J Hopkins (United States) K Schlukebir	4	3
3	(Slovakia) D Hantuchová (Spain) A Sánchez Vicario	6	6
(France) N Dechy (France) S Testud	6	6
Q	(France) A Fusai (Netherlands) C Vis	4	2
(United States) N Arendt (South Africa) L Huber	3	1
2	(Spain) V Ruano Pascual (Argentina) P Suárez	6	6

Quarterfinals
WC	(South Africa) A Coetzer (South Africa) J Steck	6	2	7^{7}
(Chinese Taipei) J Lee (Indonesia) W Prakusya	3	6	6^{3}
LL	(Argentina) ME Salerni (Sweden) Å Svensson	6	6
(Russia) E Likhovtseva (Australia) N Pratt	3	4
(Japan) A Sugiyama (Ukraine) E Tatarkova	6	3	3
3	(Slovakia) D Hantuchová (Spain) A Sánchez Vicario	2	6	6
(France) N Dechy (France) S Testud	5	6	4
2	(Spain) V Ruano Pascual (Argentina) P Suárez	7	2	6

Semifinals
WC	(South Africa) A Coetzer (South Africa) J Steck	6	6^{3}	2
LL	(Argentina) ME Salerni (Sweden) Å Svensson	4	7^{7}	6
3	(Slovakia) D Hantuchová (Spain) A Sánchez Vicario	7^{7}	6
2	(Spain) V Ruano Pascual (Argentina) P Suárez	6^{5}	4

Final
LL	(Argentina) ME Salerni (Sweden) Å Svensson	4	2
3	(Slovakia) D Hantuchová (Spain) A Sánchez Vicario	6	6
