= 1998 Bausch & Lomb Championships =

- Date: April 6 – 12
- Edition: 19th
- Category: Tier II
- Surface: Clay / outdoor
- Location: Amelia Island, Florida, U.S.
- Venue: Amelia Island Plantation

Champions

Singles
- (France) Mary Pierce

Doubles
- (United States) Sandra Cacic (France) Mary Pierce
- Amelia Island Championships

The 1998 Bausch & Lomb Championships was a tennis tournament played on outdoor clay courts at the Amelia Island Plantation on Amelia Island, Florida in the United States that was part of Tier II of the 1998 WTA Tour. The tournament was held from April 6 through April 12, 1998.

== Finals ==
=== Singles ===
(France) Mary Pierce defeated (Spain) Conchita Martínez 6–7, 6–0, 6–2

- It was Pierce's 2nd title of the year and the 13th of her career.

=== Doubles ===
(United States) Sandra Cacic / (France) Mary Pierce defeated (Austria) Barbara Schett / (Switzerland) Patty Schnyder 7–6^{(7–5)}, 4–6, 7–6^{(7–5)}

- It was Cacic's only title of the year and the 2nd of her career. It was Pierce's 3rd title of the year and the 14th of her career.
