= 1998 Bausch & Lomb Championships – Singles =

Singles
- 1998 Bausch & Lomb Championships

Final
- Champion: (France) Mary Pierce
- Runner-up: (Spain) Conchita Martínez
- Score: 6–7, 6–0, 6–2

Details
- Draw: 56 (8 Q / 4 WC )
- Seeds: 16

Events
Singles	Doubles
← 1997 ·	Amelia Island Championships	· 1999 →

Lindsay Davenport was the defending champion but lost in the semifinals to Mary Pierce.

Pierce won in the final 6–7, 6–0, 6–2 against Conchita Martínez.

== Seeds ==
A champion seed is indicated in bold text while text in italics indicates the round in which that seed was eliminated. The top eight seeds received a bye to the second round.

1. (United States) Lindsay Davenport (semifinals)
2. (South Africa) Amanda Coetzer (semifinals)
3. (United States) Monica Seles (third round)
4. (France) **Mary Pierce (champion)**
5. (Croatia) Iva Majoli (quarterfinals)
6. (Spain) Conchita Martínez (final)
7. (Romania) Irina Spîrlea (second round)
8. (Russia) Anna Kournikova (quarterfinals)
9. (Switzerland) Patty Schnyder (third round)
10. (United States) Lisa Raymond (quarterfinals)
11. (Romania) Ruxandra Dragomir (third round)
12. (South Africa) Joannette Kruger (first round)
13. (Netherlands) Brenda Schultz-McCarthy (first round)
14. (Austria) Barbara Paulus (third round)
15. (Austria) Barbara Schett (second round)
16. (Venezuela) Maria Vento (first round)

== Draw ==
=== Key ===
- Q = Qualifier
- WC = Wild card
- LL = Lucky loser
- Alt = Alternate
- SE = Special exempt
- PR = Protected ranking
- ITF = ITF entry
- JE = Junior exempt
- w/o = Walkover
- r = Retired
- d = Defaulted
- SR = Special ranking

=== Finals ===
Semifinals
1	(United States) Lindsay Davenport	**6**	3	3
4	(France) **Mary Pierce**	4	**6**	**6**
6	(Spain) **Conchita Martínez**	**6**	**6**
2	(South Africa) Amanda Coetzer	4	0

Final
4	(France) **Mary Pierce**	6	**6**	**6**
6	(Spain) Conchita Martínez	**7**	0	2

=== Top half ===
==== Section 1 ====
First round
Q	(Argentina) P Suárez	6	1
(France) **A Dechaume-Balleret**	**7**	**6**
(Argentina) **F Labat**	**6**	**6**
(Thailand) T Tanasugarn	4	2
(France) A Mauresmo	**6**	3	5
14	(Austria) **B Paulus**	2	**6**	**7**
9	(Switzerland) **P Schnyder**	**7**	**6**
(Spain) V Ruano Pascual	5	2
WC	(United States) A Wunderlich	4	2
Q	(South Africa) **M de Swardt**	**6**	**6**
(Slovakia) K Studeníková	2	1
(Germany) **W Probst**	**6**	**6**

Second round
1	(United States) **L Davenport**	**6**	**6**
(France) A Dechaume-Balleret	0	2
(Argentina) F Labat	1	0
14	(Austria) **B Paulus**	**6**	**6**
9	(Switzerland) **P Schnyder**	**6**	**6**
Q	(South Africa) M de Swardt	3	4
(Germany) W Probst	1	2
8	(Russia) **A Kournikova**	**6**	**6**

Third round
1	(United States) **L Davenport**	**7**	**6**
14	(Austria) B Paulus	5	4
9	(Switzerland) P Schnyder	1	3
8	(Russia) **A Kournikova**	**6**	**6**

Quarterfinals
1	(United States) **L Davenport**	**7**	**6**
8	(Russia) A Kournikova	5	3

==== Section 2 ====
First round
Q	(Romania) **C Cristea**	**7**	**6**
(Czech Republic) S Kleinová	6	4
Q	(Switzerland) **E Gagliardi**	2	**6**	**6**
(Spain) C Torrens Valero	**6**	2	4
(Russia) **E Likhovtseva**	**6**	**6**
12	(South Africa) J Kruger	4	2
15	(Austria) **B Schett**	**6**	**7**
Q	(Russia) T Panova	1	6
WC	(United States) **J Capriati**	**6**	**6**
WC	(United States) L Osterloh	4	2
(United States) C Rubin	6	1
Q	(Germany) **B Rittner**	**7**	**6**

Second round
4	(France) **M Pierce**	**6**	**6**
(Romania) C Cristea	1	2
Q	(Switzerland) E Gagliardi	2	5
(Russia) **E Likhovtseva**	**6**	**7**
15	(Austria) B Schett	2	3
WC	(United States) **J Capriati**	**6**	**6**
Q	(Germany) B Rittner	**7**	3	6
5	(Croatia) **I Majoli**	5	**6**	**7**

Third round
4	(France) **M Pierce**	**6**	**6**
(Russia) E Likhovtseva	4	1
WC	(United States) J Capriati	4	1
5	(Croatia) **I Majoli**	**6**	**6**

Quarterfinals
4	(France) **M Pierce**	**6**	**6**
5	(Croatia) I Majoli	3	2

=== Bottom half ===
==== Section 3 ====
First round
(Spain) G León García	2	2
(United States) **A Miller**	**6**	**6**
(United States) C Morariu	1	**7**	0
Q	(Latvia) **L Neiland**	**6**	5	**6**
(Spain) **M Sánchez Lorenzo**	**7**	**7**
16	(Venezuela) M Vento	5	5
10	(United States) **L Raymond**	4	**7**	**6**
Q	(Austria) M Maruska	**6**	5	4
LL	(Germany) **J Kandarr**	4	**6**	**6**
(Italy) S Cecchini	**6**	4	4
(Germany) **M Babel**	**6**	**6**
(China) F Li	2	2

Second round
6	(Spain) **C Martínez**	**6**	**6**
(United States) A Miller	4	3
Q	(Latvia) L Neiland	3	**7**	3
(Spain) **M Sánchez Lorenzo**	**6**	6	**6**
10	(United States) **L Raymond**	**6**	**6**
LL	(Germany) J Kandarr	1	2
(Germany) M Babel	3	2	r
3	(United States) **M Seles**	**6**	**1**

Third round
6	(Spain) **C Martínez**	**6**	**6**
(Spain) M Sánchez Lorenzo	3	1
10	(United States) **L Raymond**	**7**	**6**
3	(United States) M Seles	6	4

Quarterfinals
6	(Spain) **C Martínez**	**6**	**7**
10	(United States) L Raymond	4	5

==== Section 4 ====
First round
WC	(United States) **T Snyder**	**6**	6	**6**
(Canada) P Hy-Boulais	0	**7**	0
(France) A-G Sidot	5	0
(Russia) **E Makarova**	**7**	**6**
(Australia) **R McQuillan**	**6**	2	**7**
13	(Netherlands) B Schultz-McCarthy	1	**6**	6
11	(Romania) **R Dragomir**	**6**	**6**
(United States) S Cacic	3	2
(Belarus) O Barabanschikova	3	0
(Sweden) **Å Carlsson**	**6**	**6**
(Chinese Taipei) S-T Wang	2	3
(Spain) **M Serna**	**6**	**6**

Second round
7	(Romania) I Spîrlea	**6**	2	3
WC	(United States) **T Snyder**	2	**6**	**6**
(Russia) E Makarova	1	3
(Australia) **R McQuillan**	**6**	**6**
11	(Romania) **R Dragomir**	**7**	**6**
(Sweden) Å Carlsson	5	2
(Spain) M Serna	3	3
2	(South Africa) **A Coetzer**	**6**	**6**

Third round
WC	(United States) **T Snyder**	5	**6**	**6**
(Australia) R McQuillan	**7**	2	1
11	(Romania) R Dragomir	4	**7**	0
2	(South Africa) **A Coetzer**	**6**	6	**6**

Quarterfinals
WC	(United States) T Snyder	4	4
2	(South Africa) **A Coetzer**	**6**	**6**
