= 2003 Bausch & Lomb Championships =

- Date: April 14 – 20
- Edition: 24th
- Category: Tier II
- Draw: 48S / 16D
- Prize money: $585,000
- Surface: Clay / outdoor
- Location: Amelia Island, Florida, U.S.
- Venue: Amelia Island Plantation

Champions

Singles
- (Russia) Elena Dementieva

Doubles
- (United States) Lindsay Davenport (United States) Lisa Raymond
- Amelia Island Championships

The 2003 Bausch & Lomb Championships was a women's tennis tournament played on outdoor clay courts at the Amelia Island Plantation on Amelia Island, Florida in the United States that was part of Tier II of the 2003 WTA Tour. It was the 24th edition of the tournament and was held from April 14 through April 20, 2003. Elena Dementieva won the singles title, her first at WTA level, and earned $93,000 first-prize money.

== Finals ==
=== Singles ===
(Russia) Elena Dementieva defeated (United States) Lindsay Davenport 4–6, 7–5, 6–3

- It was Dementieva's 1st title of the year and the 1st of her career.

=== Doubles ===
(United States) Lindsay Davenport / (United States) Lisa Raymond defeated (Spain) Virginia Ruano Pascual / (Argentina) Paola Suárez 7–5, 6–2

- It was Davenport's 2nd title of the year and the 34th of her career. It was Raymond's 2nd title of the year and the 38th of her career.
