= 2001 Bausch & Lomb Championships – Singles =

Singles
- 2001 Bausch & Lomb Championships

Final
- Champion: (France) Amélie Mauresmo
- Runner-up: (South Africa) Amanda Coetzer
- Score: 6–4, 7–5

Details
- Draw: 48 (4 Q / 3 WC )
- Seeds: 16

Events
Singles	Doubles
- Amelia Island Championships

Monica Seles was the reigning champion but did not compete that year.

Amélie Mauresmo won in the final 6–4, 7–5 against Amanda Coetzer.

== Seeds ==
A champion seed is indicated in bold text while text in italics indicates the round in which that seed was eliminated. All sixteen seeds received a bye to the second round.

1. (Switzerland) Martina Hingis (quarterfinals)
2. (Spain) Conchita Martínez (second round)
3. (Russia) Elena Dementieva (quarterfinals)
4. (South Africa) Amanda Coetzer (final)
5. (France) Mary Pierce (withdrew)
6. (France) **Amélie Mauresmo (champion)**
7. (Spain) Arantxa Sánchez Vicario (semifinals)
8. (United States) Chanda Rubin (second round)
9. (Argentina) Paola Suárez (third round)
10. (United States) Meghann Shaughnessy (quarterfinals)
11. (United States) Amy Frazier (second round)
12. (United States) Lisa Raymond (third round)
13. (Federal Republic of Yugoslavia) Jelena Dokić (third round)
14. (Spain) Gala León García (second round)
15. (Slovakia) Henrieta Nagyová (third round)
16. (Russia) Elena Likhovtseva (third round)

== Draw ==
Key

- Q = Qualifier
- WC = Wild card
- LL = Lucky loser
- Alt = Alternate
- ITF = ITF entry
- PR = Protected ranking
- SR = Special ranking
- SE = Special exempt
- JE = Junior exempt
- JR = Junior Accelerator Programme entrant
- CO = College Accelerator Programme entrant
- NG = Next Gen Accelerator Program entrant
- w/o = Walkover
- r = Retired
- d = Defaulted

=== Finals ===
Semifinals
7	(Spain) Arantxa Sánchez Vicario	3	2
6	(France) **Amélie Mauresmo**	**6**	**6**
4	(South Africa) **Amanda Coetzer**	4	**7**	**6**
(Russia) Nadia Petrova	**6**	5	4

Final
6	(France) **Amélie Mauresmo**	**6**	**7**
4	(South Africa) Amanda Coetzer	4	5

=== Top half ===
==== Section 1 ====
First round
WC	(Sweden) S Arvidsson	3	2
(Spain) **V Ruano Pascual**	**6**	**6**
(United States) **L Osterloh**	**6**	**7^{11}**
Q	(Germany) G Arn	3	6^{9}
(Russia) **A Myskina**	**6**	**6**
(Croatia) I Majoli	3	1
(Romania) R Dragomir Ilie	4	2
LL	(Bulgaria) **P Nola**	**6**	**6**

Second round
1	(Switzerland) **M Hingis**	**6**	**6**
(Spain) V Ruano Pascual	2	1
(United States) L Osterloh	**6**	2	6^{4}
15	(Slovakia) **H Nagyová**	3	**6**	**7^{7}**
9	(Argentina) **P Suárez**	**7**	6^{6}	**7**
(Russia) A Myskina	5	**7^{8}**	5
LL	(Bulgaria) P Nola	3	3
7	(Spain) **A Sánchez Vicario**	**6**	**6**

Third round
1	(Switzerland) **M Hingis**	**6**	**6**
15	(Slovakia) H Nagyová	1	3
9	(Argentina) P Suárez	2	4
7	(Spain) **A Sánchez Vicario**	**6**	**6**

Quarterfinals
1	(Switzerland) M Hingis	2	4
7	(Spain) **A Sánchez Vicario**	**6**	**6**

==== Section 2 ====
First round
(Japan) S Asagoe	**6**	5	1
(France) **N Dechy**	1	**7**	**6**
(United States) C Morariu	1	3
(Paraguay) **R de los Ríos**	**6**	**6**
(United States) **J Hopkins**	**6**	3	**6**
Q	(Germany) A Glass	1	**6**	3
(Sweden) Å Carlsson	2	0
(United States) **K Brandi**	**6**	**6**

Second round
3	(Russia) **E Dementieva**	**6**	**6**
(France) N Dechy	4	3
(Paraguay) R de los Ríos	4	3
16	(Russia) **E Likhovtseva**	**6**	**6**
12	(United States) **L Raymond**	**6**	**6**
(United States) J Hopkins	4	1
(United States) K Brandi	2	1
6	(France) **A Mauresmo**	**6**	**6**

Third round
3	(Russia) **E Dementieva**	**6**	**6**
16	(Russia) E Likhovtseva	4	3
12	(United States) L Raymond	6^{3}	**6**	3
6	(France) **A Mauresmo**	**7^{7}**	4	**6**

Fourth round
3	(Russia) E Dementieva
6	(France) **A Mauresmo**	**w/o**

=== Bottom half ===
==== Section 3 ====
First round
(United States) **M Tu**	**6**	**6**
Q	(United States) M Irvin	2	3
(South Africa) J Kruger	3	**7**	3
WC	(United States) **S Cacic**	**6**	5	**6**
(Switzerland) **P Schnyder**	**7**	**6**
(Canada) J Nejedly	5	3
(Russia) **T Panova**	4	**7**	**6**
(Australia) R McQuillan	**6**	5	3

Second round
LL	(United States) E deLone	**6**	2	2
(United States) **M Tu**	3	**6**	**6**
WC	(United States) S Cacic	**6**	0	5
10	(United States) **M Shaughnessy**	2	**6**	**7**
13	(Federal Republic of Yugoslavia) **J Dokić**	**7**	**6**
(Switzerland) P Schnyder	5	3
(Russia) T Panova	5	0	r
4	(South Africa) **A Coetzer**	**7**	**3**

Third round
(United States) M Tu	**6**	5	0
10	(United States) **M Shaughnessy**	4	**7**	**6**
13	(Federal Republic of Yugoslavia) J Dokić	4	**6**	3
4	(South Africa) **A Coetzer**	**6**	2	**6**

Fourth round
10	(United States) M Shaughnessy	3	3
4	(South Africa) **A Coetzer**	**6**	**6**

==== Section 4 ====
First round
(Russia) **N Petrova**	**6**	**6**
(Argentina) M Díaz Oliva	2	4
WC	(United States) B Mattek	**6**	1	3
LL	(United States) **J Craybas**	4	**6**	**6**
(Germany) M Weingärtner	4	1
Q	(Argentina) **M E Salerni**	**6**	**6**
(Italy) **S Farina Elia**	**6**	**6**
(Australia) N Pratt	4	3

Second round
8	(United States) C Rubin	**6**	4	0
(Russia) **N Petrova**	4	**6**	**6**
LL	(United States) **J Craybas**	**6**	**6**
11	(United States) A Frazier	2	2
14	(Spain) G León García	4	1
Q	(Argentina) **M E Salerni**	**6**	**6**
(Italy) **S Farina Elia**	**6**	**6**
2	(Spain) C Martínez	4	1

Third round
(Russia) **N Petrova**	**6**	**7^{8}**
LL	(United States) J Craybas	1	6^{6}
Q	(Argentina) M E Salerni	4	2
(Italy) **S Farina Elia**	**6**	**6**

Fourth round
(Russia) **N Petrova**	4	**6**	**6**
(Italy) S Farina Elia	**6**	3	0
