= 1998 Bausch & Lomb Championships – Doubles =

Doubles
- 1998 Bausch & Lomb Championships

Final
- Champions: (United States) Sandra Cacic (France) Mary Pierce
- Runners-up: (Austria) Barbara Schett (Switzerland) Patty Schnyder
- Score: 7–6^{(7–5)}, 4–6, 7–6^{(7–5)}

Details
- Draw: 28 (1 Q / 2 WC )
- Seeds: 8

Events
Singles	Doubles
- Amelia Island Championships

Lindsay Davenport and Jana Novotná were the defending champions but only Davenport competed that year with Monica Seles.

Davenport and Seles lost in the second round to Sandra Cacic and Mary Pierce.

Cacic and Pierce won in the final 7–6^{(7–5)}, 4–6, 7–6^{(7–5)} against Barbara Schett and Patty Schnyder.

== Seeds ==
Champion seeds are indicated in bold text while text in italics indicates the round in which those seeds were eliminated. The top four seeded teams received byes into the second round.

1. (United States) Katrina Adams / (Netherlands) Manon Bollegraf (semifinals)
2. (Russia) Anna Kournikova / (Latvia) Larisa Neiland (semifinals)
3. n/a
4. (Russia) Elena Likhovtseva / (Netherlands) Caroline Vis (second round)
5. (United States) Lisa Raymond / (Australia) Rennae Stubbs (first round)
6. (United States) Lindsay Davenport / (United States) Monica Seles (second round)
7. (Australia) Rachel McQuillan / (Japan) Nana Miyagi (second round)
8. (Romania) Ruxandra Dragomir / (Croatia) Iva Majoli (quarterfinals)

== Draw ==
Key

- Q = Qualifier
- WC = Wild card
- LL = Lucky loser
- Alt = Alternate
- ITF = ITF entry
- PR = Protected ranking
- SR = Special ranking
- SE = Special exempt
- JE = Junior exempt
- JR = Junior Accelerator Programme entrant
- CO = College Accelerator Programme entrant
- NG = Next Gen Accelerator Program entrant
- w/o = Walkover
- r = Retired
- d = Defaulted

=== Final ===
Final

WC
- (United States) **Sandra Cacic**
- (France) **Mary Pierce**
**7^{7}**
4
**7^{7}**

- (Austria) Barbara Schett
- (Switzerland) Patty Schnyder
6^{5}
**6**
6^{5}

=== Top half ===
First round

Second round

Quarterfinals

Semifinals

1
- (United States) **K Adams**
- (Netherlands) **M Bollegraf**
**w/o**

- (Spain) **V Ruano Pascual**
- (Argentina) **P Suárez**
**7**
2
**7^{8}**

- (Spain) V Ruano Pascual
- (Argentina) P Suárez

- (Sweden) Å Carlsson
- (China) F Li
5
**6**
6^{6}

1
- (United States) **K Adams**
- (Netherlands) **M Bollegraf**
**6**
**6**

- (Germany) M Babel
- (Germany) W Probst
1
0
r

- (United Kingdom) S Reeves
- (Chinese Taipei) S-T Wang
2
4

- (United Kingdom) **S Reeves**
- (Chinese Taipei) **S-T Wang**
**6**
**1**

- (United Kingdom) **S Reeves**
- (Chinese Taipei) **S-T Wang**
**6**
**6**

WC
- (Belarus) O Barabanschikova
- (Spain) M Serna
**7^{7}**
2
3

7
- (Australia) R McQuillan
- (Japan) N Miyagi
3
3

7
- (Australia) **R McQuillan**
- (Japan) **N Miyagi**
6^{4}
**6**
**6**

1
- (United States) K Adams
- (Netherlands) M Bollegraf
6^{6}
3

WC
- (United States) **S Cacic**
- (France) **M Pierce**
**7^{8}**
**6**

LL
- (United States) A Miller
- (United States) T Snyder
4
0

- (Romania) **C Cristea**
- (Argentina) **L Montalvo**
**6**
**6**

- (Romania) **C Cristea**
- (Argentina) **L Montalvo**
**6**
**6**

- (Canada) S Jeyaseelan
- (Canada) R Simpson
1
1

- (Romania) C Cristea
- (Argentina) L Montalvo
**6**
2
4

- (Italy) S Cecchini
- (Argentina) F Labat
1
2

WC
- (United States) **S Cacic**
- (France) **M Pierce**
3
**6**
**6**

WC
- (United States) **S Cacic**
- (France) **M Pierce**
**6**
**6**

WC
- (United States) **S Cacic**
- (France) **M Pierce**
**w/o**

- (France) A Dechaume-Balleret
- (Canada) P Hy-Boulais
1
3

6
- (United States) L Davenport
- (United States) M Seles

6
- (United States) **L Davenport**
- (United States) **M Seles**
**6**
**6**

=== Bottom half ===
First round

Second round

Quarterfinals

Semifinals

8
- (Romania) **R Dragomir**
- (Croatia) **I Majoli**
**6**
**6**

- (Russia) E Kulikovskaya
- (Slovakia) K Studeníková
2
2

8
- (Romania) **R Dragomir**
- (Croatia) **I Majoli**
**7^{9}**
**6**

- (Germany) **B Rittner**
- (France) **A-G Sidot**
**6**
**6**

- (Germany) B Rittner
- (France) A-G Sidot
6^{7}
4

- (Canada) M Drake
- (Venezuela) M Mazzotta
4
2

8
- (Romania) R Dragomir
- (Croatia) I Majoli
**6**
5
3

Q
- (South Africa) J Kruger
- (Austria) M Maruska
2
**6**
2

- (Austria) **B Schett**
- (Switzerland) **P Schnyder**
3
**7**
**6**

- (Austria) **B Schett**
- (Switzerland) **P Schnyder**
**6**
1
**6**

- (Austria) **B Schett**
- (Switzerland) **P Schnyder**
**6**
**6**

4
- (Russia) E Likhovtseva
- (Netherlands) C Vis
4
4

- (Austria) **B Schett**
- (Switzerland) **P Schnyder**
**6**
3
**6**

5
- (United States) L Raymond
- (Australia) R Stubbs
**6**
3
3

2
- (Russia) A Kournikova
- (Latvia) L Neiland
1
**6**
4

- (United States) **C Rubin**
- (Romania) **I Spîrlea**
3
**6**
**6**

- (United States) **C Rubin**
- (Romania) **I Spîrlea**
**6**
**6**

- (Czech Republic) **E Martincová**
- (Bulgaria) **P Stoyanova**
1
**7^{9}**
**7^{7}**

- (Czech Republic) E Martincová
- (Bulgaria) P Stoyanova
1
1

- (United States) D Graham
- (Argentina) K Rinaldi
**6**
6^{7}
6^{5}

- (United States) C Rubin
- (Romania) I Spîrlea
3
3

- (Argentina) M Paz
- (Netherlands) B Schultz-McCarthy
0
r

2
- (Russia) **A Kournikova**
- (Latvia) **L Neiland**
**6**
**6**

- (Australia) **L Pleming**
- (United States) **A Wunderlich**
**2**

- (Australia) L Pleming
- (United States) A Wunderlich
2
**7^{7}**
3

2
- (Russia) **A Kournikova**
- (Latvia) **L Neiland**
**6**
6^{1}
**6**
