= 1992 Bausch & Lomb Championships – Singles =

Singles
- 1992 Bausch & Lomb Championships

Final
- Champion: (Argentina) Gabriela Sabatini
- Runner-up: (Germany) Steffi Graf
- Score: 6–2, 1–6, 6–3

Details
- Draw: 56 (1WC/8Q/1LL)
- Seeds: 16

Events
Singles	Doubles
← 1991 ·	Amelia Island Championships	· 1993 →

Gabriela Sabatini successfully defended her title by defeating Steffi Graf 6–2, 1–6, 6–3 in the final.

== Seeds ==
The first eight seeds received a bye to the second round.

1. (Germany) Steffi Graf (final)
2. (Argentina) Gabriela Sabatini (champion)
3. (Spain) Arantxa Sánchez Vicario (semifinals)
4. (Spain) Conchita Martínez (semifinals)
5. (Czechoslovakia) Jana Novotná (quarterfinals)
6. (Bulgaria) Katerina Maleeva (third round)
7. (Commonwealth of Independent States) Leila Meskhi (quarterfinals)
8. (United States) Zina Garrison (quarterfinals)
9. (Commonwealth of Independent States) Natasha Zvereva (third round)
10. (Netherlands) Brenda Schultz (third round)
11. (Italy) Sandra Cecchini (third round)
12. (United States) Patty Fendick (third round)
13. (United States) ~~Debbie Graham~~ (withdrew)
14. (United States) Tami Whitlinger (second round)
15. (United States) Ann Grossman (first round)
16. (Argentina) Inés Gorrochategui (third round)

== Draw ==
=== Key ===
- Q = Qualifier
- WC = Wild card
- LL = Lucky loser
- Alt = Alternate
- ITF = ITF entry
- PR = Protected ranking
- SR = Special ranking
- SE = Special exempt
- JE = Junior exempt
- JR = Junior Accelerator Programme entrant
- CO = College Accelerator Programme entrant
- NG = Next Gen Accelerator Program entrant
- w/o = Walkover
- r = Retired
- d = Defaulted

=== Finals ===
Quarterfinals
1	(Germany) Steffi Graf	6	6
7	(Commonwealth of Independent States) Leila Meskhi	0	2
3	(Spain) Arantxa Sánchez Vicario	6	6
(Germany) Sabine Hack	1	2
8	(United States) Zina Garrison	3	1
4	(Spain) Conchita Martínez	6	6
5	(Czechoslovakia) Jana Novotná	2	1
2	(Argentina) Gabriela Sabatini	6	6

Semifinals
1	(Germany) Steffi Graf	6^{3}	6	6
3	(Spain) Arantxa Sánchez Vicario	7^{7}	4	3
4	(Spain) Conchita Martínez	3	3
2	(Argentina) Gabriela Sabatini	6	6

Final
1	(Germany) Steffi Graf	2	6	3
2	(Argentina) Gabriela Sabatini	6	1	6

=== Top half ===
==== Section 1 ====
First round
(Argentina) B Fulco-Villella	6^{0}	0
(Germany) S Meier	7^{7}	6
(Czechoslovakia) D Szabová	6	1	3
(Argentina) F Labat	4	6	6
(Argentina) M Paz	1	2
10	(Netherlands) B Schultz	6	6
12	(United States) P Fendick	6	4	6
Q	(United States) E Burgin	1	6	2
LL	(United States) Ca MacGregor	3	3
(Argentina) P Tarabini	6	6
(United States) B Bowes	6	6
(United States) D Faber	2	0

Second round
1	(Germany) S Graf	7	6
(Germany) S Meier	5	1
(Argentina) F Labat	6	3	5
10	(Netherlands) B Schultz	1	6	7
12	(United States) P Fendick	5	6	6
(Argentina) P Tarabini	7	1	2
(United States) B Bowes	2	4
7	(Commonwealth of Independent States) L Meskhi	6	6

Third round
1	(Germany) S Graf	6	6
10	(Netherlands) B Schultz	2	2
12	(United States) P Fendick	2	2
7	(Commonwealth of Independent States) L Meskhi	6	6

Quarterfinals
1	(Germany) S Graf	6	6
7	(Commonwealth of Independent States) L Meskhi	0	2

==== Section 2 ====
First round
(Germany) C Kohde-Kilsch	6	7^{9}
(United States) S Stafford	4	6^{7}
(United States) T Whittington	6	1	7
(Czechoslovakia) R Rajchrtová	3	6	5
Q	(United States) S Martin	1	7	4
16	(Argentina) I Gorrochategui	6	5	6
14	(United States) T Whitlinger	6	6
Q	(Czechoslovakia) Z Málková	1	0
(Germany) S Hack	6	6
(United States) L Allen	0	3
WC	(United States) M Jackson-Nobrega	2	6	6^{8}
(United States) H Cioffi	6	4	7^{10}

Second round
3	(Spain) A Sánchez Vicario	6	6
(Germany) C Kohde-Kilsch	2	2
(United States) T Whittington	0	2
16	(Argentina) I Gorrochategui	6	6
14	(United States) T Whitlinger	0	3
(Germany) S Hack	6	6
(United States) H Cioffi	4	1
6	(Bulgaria) K Maleeva	6	6

Third round
3	(Spain) A Sánchez Vicario	6	6
16	(Argentina) I Gorrochategui	0	2
(Germany) S Hack	6	6
6	(Bulgaria) K Maleeva	4	3

Quarterfinals
3	(Spain) A Sánchez Vicario	6	6
(Germany) S Hack	1	2

=== Bottom half ===
==== Section 3 ====
First round
(Commonwealth of Independent States) E Maniokova	6^{0}	6	5
(Germany) S Frankl	7^{7}	1	7
Q	(Canada) C Bassett-Seguso	3	6	6
Q	(United States) L Davenport	6	4	2
(Austria) P Ritter	4	6^{7}
9	(Commonwealth of Independent States) N Zvereva	6	7^{9}
11	(Italy) S Cecchini	6	6
(United States) C Rubin	2	1
(United States) G Helgeson	6	7^{7}
(Bulgaria) E Pampoulova-Wagner	3	6^{4}
(Germany) V Martinek	4	3
Q	(Greece) C Papadáki	6	6

Second round
8	(United States) Z Garrison	7	6
(Germany) S Frankl	5	3
Q	(Canada) C Bassett-Seguso	3	4
9	(Commonwealth of Independent States) N Zvereva	6	6
11	(Italy) S Cecchini	2	7^{8}	6
(United States) G Helgeson	6	6^{6}	2
Q	(Greece) C Papadáki	0	3
4	(Spain) C Martínez	6	6

Third round
8	(United States) Z Garrison	6	6
9	(Commonwealth of Independent States) N Zvereva	3	1
11	(Italy) S Cecchini	2	0
4	(Spain) C Martínez	6	6

Quarterfinals
8	(United States) Z Garrison	3	1
4	(Spain) C Martínez	6	6

==== Section 4 ====
First round
Q	(United States) R Jensen	0	2
(France) S Niox-Château	6	6
(Canada) P Hy	1	6	6
(United States) A Keller	6	4	0
(Hungary) A Temesvári	2	5
(Italy) F Bonsignori	6	7
15	(United States) A Grossman	4	2
(Italy) L Garrone	6	6
Q	(United States) J Santrock	2	1
WC	(United States) K Rinaldi	6	6
(United States) L Harvey Wild	1	6	7^{10}
(South Africa) R Fairbank-Nideffer	6	1	6^{8}

Second round
5	(Czechoslovakia) J Novotná	6^{6}	6	6
(France) S Niox-Château	7^{8}	1	1
(Canada) P Hy	2	6	6
(Italy) F Bonsignori	6	0	4
(Italy) L Garrone	5	2
WC	(United States) K Rinaldi	7	6
(United States) L Harvey Wild	3	5
2	(Argentina) G Sabatini	6	7

Third round
5	(Czechoslovakia) J Novotná	6	2
(Canada) P Hy	1	1^{r}
WC	(United States) K Rinaldi	0	3
2	(Argentina) G Sabatini	6	6

Quarterfinals
5	(Czechoslovakia) J Novotná	2	1
2	(Argentina) G Sabatini	6	6
