= 1991 Bausch & Lomb Championships – Singles =

Singles
- 1991 Bausch & Lomb Championships

Final
- Champion: (Argentina) Gabriela Sabatini
- Runner-up: (Germany) Steffi Graf
- Score: 7–5, 7–6^{(7–3)}

Details
- Draw: 56 (2WC/8Q/2LL)
- Seeds: 16

Events
Singles	Doubles
← 1990 ·	Amelia Island Championships	· 1992 →

Steffi Graf was the defending champion, but lost in the final to Gabriela Sabatini. The score was 7–5, 7–6^{(7–3)}.

== Seeds ==
The first eight seeds received a bye to the second round.

1. (Germany) Steffi Graf (final)
2. (Argentina) Gabriela Sabatini (champion)
3. (Spain) Arantxa Sánchez Vicario (semifinals)
4. (United States) Zina Garrison (quarterfinals)
5. (Czechoslovakia) Helena Suková (quarterfinals)
6. (Soviet Union) Natasha Zvereva (quarterfinals)
7. (Soviet Union) Leila Meskhi (quarterfinals)
8. (Italy) Sandra Cecchini (second round)
9. (Germany) Isabel Cueto (third round)
10. (United States) Susan Sloane (first round)
11. (Argentina) Mercedes Paz (first round)
12. (Germany) Sabine Hack (first round, retired)
13. (Germany) Claudia Kohde-Kilsch (second round)
14. (Germany) Veronika Martinek (third round)
15. (United States) Stephanie Rehe (first round)
16. (Canada) Patricia Hy (first round)

== Draw ==
=== Key ===
- Q = Qualifier
- WC = Wild card
- LL = Lucky loser
- Alt = Alternate
- ITF = ITF entry
- PR = Protected ranking
- SR = Special ranking
- SE = Special exempt
- JE = Junior exempt
- JR = Junior Accelerator Programme entrant
- CO = College Accelerator Programme entrant
- NG = Next Gen Accelerator Program entrant
- w/o = Walkover
- r = Retired
- d = Defaulted

=== Finals ===
Quarterfinals
1	(Germany) Steffi Graf	6	6
6	(Soviet Union) Natasha Zvereva	0	2
4	(United States) Zina Garrison	1	4
(United States) Patty Fendick	6	6
7	(Soviet Union) Leila Meskhi	1	6^{1}
3	(Spain) Arantxa Sánchez Vicario	6	7^{7}
5	(Czechoslovakia) Helena Suková	2	1
2	(Argentina) Gabriela Sabatini	6	6

Semifinals
1	(Germany) Steffi Graf	6	6
(United States) Patty Fendick	0	1
3	(Spain) Arantxa Sánchez Vicario	2	6	4
2	(Argentina) Gabriela Sabatini	6	2	6

Final
1	(Germany) Steffi Graf	5	6^{3}
2	(Argentina) Gabriela Sabatini	7	7^{7}

=== Top half ===
==== Section 1 ====
First round
Q	(Germany) A Kerek	3	1
LL	(Canada) R Simpson-Alter	6	6
(Soviet Union) E Brioukhovets	2	1
Q	(South Africa) M de Swardt	6	6
(New Zealand) C Toleafoa	3	2
9	(Germany) I Cueto	6	6
14	(Germany) V Martinek	4	7^{7}	6
(United States) A Keller	6	6^{2}	3
(Czechoslovakia) P Langrová	5
(United States) C Benjamin	4^{r}
Q	(United States) J Emmons	6^{4}	6	6
(United Kingdom) S Smith	7^{7}	4	3

Second round
1	(Germany) S Graf	6	6
LL	(Canada) R Simpson-Alter	4	0
Q	(South Africa) M de Swardt	7^{7}	2	4
9	(Germany) I Cueto	6^{3}	6	6
14	(Germany) V Martinek	6	6
(Czechoslovakia) P Langrová	3	3
Q	(United States) J Emmons	1	2
6	(Soviet Union) N Zvereva	6	6

Third round
1	(Germany) S Graf	6	6
9	(Germany) I Cueto	1	1
14	(Germany) V Martinek	6	2	1
6	(Soviet Union) N Zvereva	1	6	6

Quarterfinals
1	(Germany) S Graf	6	6
6	(Soviet Union) N Zvereva	0	2

==== Section 2 ====
First round
(Italy) L Garrone	6	6
(Germany) S Meier	3	3
LL	(Germany) S Frankl	6	6
Q	(United States) S Cacic	2	3
(Greece) A Kanellopoulou	6	2	6
10	(United States) S Sloane	1	6	1
12	(Germany) S Hack	2^{r}
(Argentina) P Tarabini	3
(United States) D Faber	2	1
(United States) P Fendick	6	6
(Argentina) F Labat	6^{2}	3
(Netherlands) B Schultz	7^{7}	6

Second round
4	(United States) Z Garrison	7^{7}	6
(Italy) L Garrone	6^{5}	3
LL	(Germany) S Frankl	0	2
(Greece) A Kanellopoulou	6	6
(Argentina) P Tarabini	3	6	1
(United States) P Fendick	6	0	6
(Netherlands) B Schultz	6	6
8	(Italy) S Cecchini	3	0

Third round
4	(United States) Z Garrison	6	6
(Greece) A Kanellopoulou	2	4
(United States) P Fendick	6	6
(Netherlands) B Schultz	3	4

Quarterfinals
4	(United States) Z Garrison	1	4
(United States) P Fendick	6	6

=== Bottom half ===
==== Section 3 ====
First round
WC	(United States) Julie Exum	5	3
(Hungary) A Temesvári	7	6
(Argentina) B Fulco	6	6
(Poland) R Baranski	1	1
(United States) T Whitlinger	3	6	6
11	(Argentina) M Paz	6	3	2
16	(Canada) P Hy	2	6	4
(United States) H Cioffi	6	4	6
(Argentina) C Tessi	5	7	3
(Czechoslovakia) R Zrubáková	7	5	6
(United States) L Harvey Wild	7	6
Q	(Italy) S Farina	5	3

Second round
7	(Soviet Union) L Meskhi	6	6
(Hungary) A Temesvári	0	0
(Argentina) B Fulco	6	2	3
(United States) T Whitlinger	2	6	6
(United States) H Cioffi	6	6
(Czechoslovakia) R Zrubáková	2	4
(United States) L Harvey Wild	3	0
3	(Spain) A Sánchez Vicario	6	6

Third round
7	(Soviet Union) L Meskhi	6	6
(United States) T Whitlinger	0	1
(United States) H Cioffi	3	1
3	(Spain) A Sánchez Vicario	6	6

Quarterfinals
7	(Soviet Union) L Meskhi	1	6^{1}
3	(Spain) A Sánchez Vicario	6	7^{7}

==== Section 4 ====
First round
(Belgium) S Wasserman	6	6^{5}	3
WC	(United States) C Rubin	3	7^{7}	6
(United States) G Helgeson	6	6^{5}	6
(Brazil) L Corsato	4	7^{7}	2
Q	(Sweden) M Lindström	0	2
13	(Germany) C Kohde-Kilsch	6	6
15	(United States) S Rehe	6^{7}	1
Q	(United States) C Kuhlman	7^{9}	6
(United States) Ca MacGregor	3	4
Q	(United States) L Spadea	6	6
(Italy) L Lapi	0	1
(Italy) F Bonsignori	6	6

Second round
5	(Czechoslovakia) H Suková	6^{7}	7	6
WC	(United States) C Rubin	7^{9}	5	2
(United States) G Helgeson	6	6^{5}	6
13	(Germany) C Kohde-Kilsch	3	7^{7}	4
Q	(United States) C Kuhlman	4	6	4
Q	(United States) L Spadea	6	1	6
(Italy) F Bonsignori	1	0
2	(Argentina) G Sabatini	6	6

Third round
5	(Czechoslovakia) H Suková	6	6^{3}	6
(United States) G Helgeson	4	7^{7}	2
Q	(United States) L Spadea	0	1
2	(Argentina) G Sabatini	6	6

Quarterfinals
5	(Czechoslovakia) H Suková	2	1
2	(Argentina) G Sabatini	6	6
