= 1992 Bausch & Lomb Championships – Doubles =

Doubles
- 1992 Bausch & Lomb Championships

Final
- Champions: (Spain) Arantxa Sánchez Vicario (Commonwealth of Independent States) Natasha Zvereva
- Runners-up: (United States) Zina Garrison (Czechoslovakia) Jana Novotná
- Score: 6–1, 6–0

Details
- Draw: 28 (2WC/1Q)
- Seeds: 8

Events
Singles	Doubles
← 1991 ·	Amelia Island Championships	· 1993 →

Arantxa Sánchez Vicario and Helena Suková were the defending champions, but Suková did not compete this year.

Sánchez Vicario teamed up with Natasha Zvereva and successfully defended her title, by defeating Zina Garrison and Jana Novotná 6–1, 6–0 in the final.

== Seeds ==
The first four seeds received a bye to the second round.

1. (Spain) Arantxa Sánchez Vicario / (Commonwealth of Independent States) Natasha Zvereva (champions)
2. (United States) Zina Garrison / (Czechoslovakia) Jana Novotná (final)
3. (Canada) Jill Hetherington / (United States) Kathy Rinaldi (quarterfinals)
4. (Commonwealth of Independent States) Leila Meskhi / (Argentina) Mercedes Paz (quarterfinals)
5. (United States) Elise Burgin / (United States) Patty Fendick (second round)
6. (South Africa) Rosalyn Fairbank-Nideffer / (Netherlands) Brenda Schultz (semifinals)
7. (Italy) Sandra Cecchini / (Argentina) Patricia Tarabini (quarterfinals)
8. (United States) Linda Harvey Wild / (United States) Shaun Stafford (first round)

== Draw ==
=== Key ===
- Q = Qualifier
- WC = Wild card
- LL = Lucky loser
- Alt = Alternate
- ITF = ITF entry
- PR = Protected ranking
- SR = Special ranking
- SE = Special exempt
- JE = Junior exempt
- JR = Junior Accelerator Programme entrant
- CO = College Accelerator Programme entrant
- NG = Next Gen Accelerator Program entrant
- w/o = Walkover
- r = Retired
- d = Defaulted

=== Finals ===
Semifinals
1	(Spain) Arantxa Sánchez Vicario (Commonwealth of Independent States) Natasha Zvereva	6	6
6	(South Africa) Rosalyn Fairbank-Nideffer (Netherlands) Brenda Schultz	3	2
(United States) Beverly Bowes (United States) Tami Whitlinger	6	6^{4}	1
2	(United States) Zina Garrison (Czechoslovakia) Jana Novotná	4	7^{7}	6

Final
1	(Spain) Arantxa Sánchez Vicario (Commonwealth of Independent States) Natasha Zvereva	6	6
2	(United States) Zina Garrison (Czechoslovakia) Jana Novotná	1	0

=== Top half ===
First round
(Czechoslovakia) Z Málková (Czechoslovakia) D Szabová	2	6	6
(United States) L Allen (France) S Amiach	6	3	2
(Bulgaria) E Pampoulova-Wagner (Austria) P Ritter	6	5	6
(United States) G Helgeson (United States) J Santrock	3	7	2
(Germany) S Frankl (Germany) S Meier	3	3
7	(Italy) S Cecchini (Argentina) P Tarabini	6	6
(United States) C MacGregor (United States) P Mager	7^{7}	6
(United States) H Cioffi (United States) A Keller	6^{3}	4
WC	(United States) Christine O'Reilly (United States) P O'Reilly	6	3	6
(Commonwealth of Independent States) E Maniokova (United States) L Spadea	1	6	2
(United States) A Grossman (Germany) S Hack	1	4
6	(South Africa) R Fairbank-Nideffer (Netherlands) B Schultz	6	6

Second round
1	(Spain) A Sánchez Vicario (Commonwealth of Independent States) N Zvereva	6	6
(United States) L Allen (France) S Amiach	0	1
(Bulgaria) E Pampoulova-Wagner (Austria) P Ritter	3	4
7	(Italy) S Cecchini (Argentina) P Tarabini	6	6
3	(Canada) J Hetherington (United States) K Rinaldi	6	4	6
(United States) C MacGregor (United States) P Mager	2	6	1
WC	(United States) C O'Reilly (United States) P O'Reilly	4	0
6	(South Africa) R Fairbank-Nideffer (Netherlands) B Schultz	6	6

Quarterfinals
1	(Spain) A Sánchez Vicario (Commonwealth of Independent States) N Zvereva	6	6
7	(Italy) S Cecchini (Argentina) P Tarabini	3	1
3	(Canada) J Hetherington (United States) K Rinaldi	1	4
6	(South Africa) R Fairbank-Nideffer (Netherlands) B Schultz	6	6

Semifinals
1	(Spain) A Sánchez Vicario (Commonwealth of Independent States) N Zvereva	6	6
6	(South Africa) R Fairbank-Nideffer (Netherlands) B Schultz	3	2

=== Bottom half ===
First round
8	(United States) L Harvey Wild (United States) S Stafford	6	0	2
(United States) B Bowes (United States) T Whitlinger	3	6	6
WC	(Canada) C Bassett-Seguso (United States) T Whittington	w/o
(Canada) P Hy (United States) C Kuhlman
(Brazil) L Corsato (France) S Niox-Château	6^{2}	6	6^{7}
(United States) L Glitz (Poland) R Baranski	7^{7}	4	7^{9}
5	(United States) E Burgin (United States) P Fendick	6	6
(Argentina) B Fulco (Argentina) F Labat	3	0
Q	(United States) Lynn Nabors (United States) N Sodupe	0	2
(Italy) L Garrone (Argentina) I Gorrochategui	6	6
(Czechoslovakia) R Rajchrtová (Hungary) A Temesvári	1	2
(United States) L Davenport (United States) C Rubin	6	6

Second round
(United States) B Bowes (United States) T Whitlinger	7^{7}	6
WC	(Canada) C Bassett-Seguso (United States) T Whittington	6^{2}	4
(United States) L Glitz (Poland) R Baranski	4	1
4	(Commonwealth of Independent States) L Meskhi (Argentina) M Paz	6	6
5	(United States) E Burgin (United States) P Fendick	4	6	2
(Italy) L Garrone (Argentina) I Gorrochategui	6	1	6
(United States) L Davenport (United States) C Rubin	1	1
2	(United States) Z Garrison (Czechoslovakia) J Novotná	6	6

Quarterfinals
(United States) B Bowes (United States) T Whitlinger	4	7^{7}	6
4	(Commonwealth of Independent States) L Meskhi (Argentina) M Paz	6	6^{5}	1
(Italy) L Garrone (Argentina) I Gorrochategui	6	1	0
2	(United States) Z Garrison (Czechoslovakia) J Novotná	4	6	6

Semifinals
(United States) B Bowes (United States) T Whitlinger	6	6^{4}	1
2	(United States) Z Garrison (Czechoslovakia) J Novotná	4	7^{7}	6
