= 1991 Bausch & Lomb Championships – Doubles =

Doubles
- 1991 Bausch & Lomb Championships

Final
- Champions: (Spain) Arantxa Sánchez Vicario (Czechoslovakia) Helena Suková
- Runners-up: (Argentina) Mercedes Paz (Soviet Union) Natasha Zvereva
- Score: 4–6, 6–2, 6–2

Details
- Draw: 28 (2Q/1LL)
- Seeds: 8

Events
Singles	Doubles
← 1990 ·	Amelia Island Championships	· 1992 →

Mercedes Paz and Arantxa Sánchez Vicario were the defending champions, but competed this year with different partners, facing each other in the final.

Sánchez Vicario, who teamed up with Helena Suková, won the title by defeating Paz and Natasha Zvereva 4–6, 6–2, 6–2 in the final.

== Seeds ==
The first four seeds received a bye to the second round.

1. (Spain) Arantxa Sánchez Vicario / (Czechoslovakia) Helena Suková (champions)
2. (Argentina) Mercedes Paz / (Soviet Union) Natasha Zvereva (final)
3. (United States) Katrina Adams / (United States) Zina Garrison (semifinals)
4. (United States) Elise Burgin / (United States) Patty Fendick (semifinals)
5. (Canada) Jill Hetherington / (United States) Kathy Rinaldi (second round)
6. (Italy) Sandra Cecchini / (Argentina) Patricia Tarabini (quarterfinals)
7. (United States) Sandy Collins / (Soviet Union) Leila Meskhi (quarterfinals)
8. (Czechoslovakia) Petra Langrová / (Czechoslovakia) Radka Zrubáková (quarterfinals)

== Draw ==
=== Key ===
- Q = Qualifier
- WC = Wild card
- LL = Lucky loser
- Alt = Alternate
- ITF = ITF entry
- PR = Protected ranking
- SR = Special ranking
- SE = Special exempt
- JE = Junior exempt
- JR = Junior Accelerator Programme entrant
- CO = College Accelerator Programme entrant
- NG = Next Gen Accelerator Program entrant
- w/o = Walkover
- r = Retired
- d = Defaulted

=== Finals ===
Semifinals
1	(Spain) Arantxa Sánchez Vicario (Czechoslovakia) Helena Suková	6	6^{1}	6
3	(United States) Katrina Adams (United States) Zina Garrison	3	7^{7}	1
4	(United States) Elise Burgin (United States) Patty Fendick	7^{7}	3	1
2	(Argentina) Mercedes Paz (Soviet Union) Natasha Zvereva	6^{1}	6	6

Final
1	(Spain) Arantxa Sánchez Vicario (Czechoslovakia) Helena Suková	4	6	6
2	(Argentina) Mercedes Paz (Soviet Union) Natasha Zvereva	6	2	2

=== Top half ===
First round
(Greece) A Kanellopoulou (Argentina) F Labat	5	0
(France) S Amiach (Sweden) M Lindström	7	6
(United States) B Bowes (United States) L Spadea	3	2
(Italy) S Farina (Belgium) S Wasserman	6	6
(United States) J Emmons (United States) S Schefflin	5	4
6	(Italy) S Cecchini (Argentina) P Tarabini	7	6
(United States) H Cioffi (United States) S Sloane	4	6	6
(United States) C Benjamin (Brazil) L Corsato	6	4	2
(United States) C MacGregor (United States) P Mager	6	6
(United Kingdom) S Smith (New Zealand) C Toleafoa	4	1
(Canada) P Hy (Canada) R Simpson-Alter	4	4
8	(Czechoslovakia) P Langrová (Czechoslovakia) R Zrubáková	6	6

Second round
1	(Spain) A Sánchez Vicario (Czechoslovakia) H Suková	6	6
(France) S Amiach (Sweden) M Lindström	1	0
(Italy) S Farina (Belgium) S Wasserman	3	1
6	(Italy) S Cecchini (Argentina) P Tarabini	6	6
3	(United States) K Adams (United States) Z Garrison	6	6
(United States) H Cioffi (United States) S Sloane	0	2
(United States) C MacGregor (United States) P Mager	5	6	6^{4}
8	(Czechoslovakia) P Langrová (Czechoslovakia) R Zrubáková	7	1	7^{7}

Quarterfinals
1	(Spain) A Sánchez Vicario (Czechoslovakia) H Suková	6	6
6	(Italy) S Cecchini (Argentina) P Tarabini	0	3
3	(United States) K Adams (United States) Z Garrison	6	5	6
8	(Czechoslovakia) P Langrová (Czechoslovakia) R Zrubáková	4	7	4

Semifinals
1	(Spain) A Sánchez Vicario (Czechoslovakia) H Suková	6	6^{1}	6
3	(United States) K Adams (United States) Z Garrison	3	7^{7}	1

=== Bottom half ===
First round
5	(Canada) J Hetherington (United States) K Rinaldi	6	6
(United States) L Harvey Wild (United States) G Helgeson	3	4
(United States) S Rehe (Hungary) A Temesvári	6	6
Q	(United States) S Cacic (United States) N Sodupe	1	4
(United States) D Faber (United States) T Whitlinger	6	3	4
(Argentina) B Fulco (Italy) L Garrone	3	6	6
7	(United States) S Collins (Soviet Union) L Meskhi	6	7
(Netherlands) G Coorengel (Netherlands) A van Buuren	3	5
LL	(Germany) S Frankl (Greece) C Papadáki	6	7
Q	(South Africa) R Gaddie (South Africa) M de Swardt	4	5
(United States) P O'Reilly (United States) Terri O'Reilly	3	4
(Poland) R Baranski (United States) T Whittington	6	6

Second round
5	(Canada) J Hetherington (United States) K Rinaldi	1	7^{7}	4
(United States) S Rehe (Hungary) A Temesvári	6	6^{5}	6
(Argentina) B Fulco (Italy) L Garrone	3	3
4	(United States) E Burgin (United States) P Fendick	6	6
7	(United States) S Collins (Soviet Union) L Meskhi	6	6
LL	(Germany) S Frankl (Greece) C Papadáki	2	3
(Poland) R Baranski (United States) T Whittington	0	0
2	(Argentina) M Paz (Soviet Union) N Zvereva	6	6

Quarterfinals
(United States) S Rehe (Hungary) A Temesvári	6	4	3
4	(United States) E Burgin (United States) P Fendick	2	6	6
7	(United States) S Collins (Soviet Union) L Meskhi	3	2
2	(Argentina) M Paz (Soviet Union) N Zvereva	6	6

Semifinals
4	(United States) E Burgin (United States) P Fendick	7^{7}	3	1
2	(Argentina) M Paz (Soviet Union) N Zvereva	6^{1}	6	6
