= 1993 Bausch & Lomb Championships =

- Date: April 5–11
- Edition: 14th
- Category: Tier II
- Draw: 56S / 24D
- Prize money: $375,000
- Surface: Clay / outdoor
- Location: Amelia Island, Florida, U.S.
- Venue: Amelia Island Plantation

Champions

Singles
- (Spain) Arantxa Sánchez Vicario

Doubles
- (Switzerland) Manuela Maleeva-Fragnière; (Georgia (country)) Leila Meskhi
| ← 1992 · | Amelia Island Championships | · 1994 → |

The 1993 Bausch & Lomb Championships was a women's tennis tournament played on outdoor clay courts at the Amelia Island Plantation on Amelia Island, Florida in the United States that was part of Tier II of the 1993 WTA Tour. It was the 14th edition of the tournament and was held from April 5 through April 11, 1993. First-seeded Arantxa Sánchez Vicario won the singles title.

== Finals ==
=== Singles ===
(Spain) Arantxa Sánchez Vicario defeated (Argentina) Gabriela Sabatini 6–2, 5–7, 6–2

- It was Sánchez Vicario's 2nd title of the year and the 10th of her career.

=== Doubles ===
(Switzerland) Manuela Maleeva-Fragnière / (Georgia (country)) Leila Meskhi defeated (South Africa) Amanda Coetzer / (Argentina) Inés Gorrochategui 3–6, 6–3, 6–4

- It was Maleeva-Fragnière's 1st title of the year and the 4th of her career. It was Meskhi's 2nd title of the year and the 4th of her career.
