= 1993 Bausch & Lomb Championships – Singles =

Singles
- 1993 Bausch & Lomb Championships

Final
- Champion: (Spain) Arantxa Sánchez Vicario
- Runner-up: (Argentina) Gabriela Sabatini
- Score: 6–2, 5–7, 6–2

Details
- Draw: 56 (2WC/8Q/1LL)
- Seeds: 16

Events
Singles	Doubles
← 1992 ·	Amelia Island Championships	· 1994 →

Gabriela Sabatini was the defending champion, but lost in the final to Arantxa Sánchez Vicario. The score was 6–2, 5–7, 6–2.

== Seeds ==
The first eight seeds received a bye into the second round.

1. (Spain) Arantxa Sánchez Vicario (champion)
2. (Argentina) Gabriela Sabatini (final)
3. (United States) Jennifer Capriati (quarterfinals)
4. (Switzerland) Manuela Maleeva-Fragnière (semifinals)
5. (South Africa) Amanda Coetzer (semifinals)
6. (Belarus) Natasha Zvereva (quarterfinals)
7. (United States) Lori McNeil (third round)
8. (Georgia (country)) Leila Meskhi (quarterfinals)
9. (Germany) Sabine Hack (third round)
10. (Italy) Sandra Cecchini (first round)
11. (Canada) ~~Patricia Hy~~ (withdrew)
12. (Netherlands) Brenda Schultz (first round)
13. (United States) Lindsay Davenport (third round)
14. (Argentina) Florencia Labat (second round)
15. (South Africa) Rosalyn Fairbank-Nideffer (first round)
16. (Germany) Veronika Martinek (second round)

== Draw ==
=== Key ===
- Q = Qualifier
- WC = Wild card
- LL = Lucky loser
- Alt = Alternate
- SE = Special exempt
- PR = Protected ranking
- ITF = ITF entry
- JE = Junior exempt
- w/o = Walkover
- r = Retired
- d = Defaulted
- SR = Special ranking

=== Finals ===
Quarterfinals
1	(Spain) Arantxa Sánchez Vicario	6	6
(United States) Shaun Stafford	2	4
4	(Switzerland) Manuela Maleeva-Fragnière	6	6
6	(Belarus) Natasha Zvereva	0	3
5	(South Africa) Amanda Coetzer	6	1	6
3	(United States) Jennifer Capriati	2	6	4
8	(Georgia (country)) Leila Meskhi	1	0
2	(Argentina) Gabriela Sabatini	6	6

Semifinals
1	(Spain) Arantxa Sánchez Vicario	6	6
4	(Switzerland) Manuela Maleeva-Fragnière	4	2
5	(South Africa) Amanda Coetzer	3	2
2	(Argentina) Gabriela Sabatini	6	6

Final
1	(Spain) Arantxa Sánchez Vicario	6	5	6
2	(Argentina) Gabriela Sabatini	2	7	2

=== Top half ===
==== Section 1 ====
First round
(Italy) F Perfetti	7^{8}	7^{9}
Q	(United States) R Jensen	6^{6}	6^{7}
(United States) C Kuhlman	6	7^{7}
Q	(Italy) L Golarsa	3	6^{4}
(United States) B Bowes	3	2
13	(United States) L Davenport	6	6
15	(South Africa) R Fairbank-Nideffer	1	3
(United States) S Stafford	6	6
(Czech Republic) R Bobková	6	1	6
(Argentina) M Paz	0	6	2
Q	(United States) N Hummel	2	4
(Italy) F Bonsignori	6	6

Second round
1	(Spain) A Sánchez Vicario	6	6
(Italy) F Perfetti	1	2
(United States) C Kuhlman	6	2	3
13	(United States) L Davenport	1	6	6
(United States) S Stafford	6	6
(Czech Republic) R Bobková	2	4
(Italy) F Bonsignori	3	5
7	(United States) L McNeil	6	7

Third round
1	(Spain) A Sánchez Vicario	6	6
13	(United States) L Davenport	2	4
(United States) S Stafford	7^{7}	4	6
7	(United States) L McNeil	6^{3}	6	3

Quarterfinals
1	(Spain) A Sánchez Vicario	6	6
(United States) S Stafford	2	4

==== Section 2 ====
First round
(France) A Fusai	6	6
(France) N van Lottum	4	0
(Slovakia) D Szabová	7	4	0
(Germany) K Kschwendt	5	6	6
(United States) J Santrock	1	6^{2}
9	(Germany) S Hack	6	7^{7}
12	(Netherlands) B Schultz	4	3
(Argentina) P Tarabini	6	6
(Germany) S Meier	3	2
Q	(United States) J Watanabe	6	6
(United States) T Whitlinger	3	4
(Argentina) B Fulco-Villella	6	6

Second round
4	(Switzerland) M Maleeva-Fragnière	6	6
(France) A Fusai	2	2
(Germany) K Kschwendt	1^{r}
9	(Germany) S Hack	4
(Argentina) P Tarabini	6	6
Q	(United States) J Watanabe	0	2
(Argentina) B Fulco-Villella	2	4
6	(Belarus) N Zvereva	6	6

Third round
4	(Switzerland) M Maleeva-Fragnière	7	6
9	(Germany) S Hack	5	4
(Argentina) P Tarabini	5	6	4
6	(Belarus) N Zvereva	7	1	6

Quarterfinals
4	(Switzerland) M Maleeva-Fragnière	6	6
6	(Belarus) N Zvereva	0	3

=== Bottom half ===
==== Section 3 ====
First round
Q	(Bulgaria) L Bacheva	1	4
(Croatia) N Ercegović	6	6
(United States) K Rinaldi	3	6	6
(Germany) S Frankl	6	4	2
(Germany) C Singer	3	6	6
10	(Italy) S Cecchini	6	1	4
14	(Argentina) F Labat	3	6	6
(Hungary) A Temesvári	6	2	0
WC	(Greece) C Papadáki	6	5	1
(Argentina) I Gorrochategui	1	7	6
(Netherlands) M Bollegraf	7	6^{1}	3
Q	(Russia) T Ignatieva	5	7^{7}	6

Second round
5	(South Africa) A Coetzer	7	6
(Croatia) N Ercegović	5	3
(United States) K Rinaldi	6	6
(Germany) C Singer	2	2
14	(Argentina) F Labat	6^{3}	6	1
(Argentina) I Gorrochategui	7^{7}	2	6
Q	(Russia) T Ignatieva	1	0
3	(United States) J Capriati	6	6

Third round
5	(South Africa) A Coetzer	7	5	6
(United States) K Rinaldi	5	7	3
(Argentina) I Gorrochategui	3	1
3	(United States) J Capriati	6	6

Quarterfinals
5	(South Africa) A Coetzer	6	1	6
3	(United States) J Capriati	2	6	4

==== Section 4 ====
First round
(Switzerland) C Fauche	1	3
(United States) C Rubin	6	6
(Mexico) A Gavaldón	6	7^{7}
Q	(Brazil) A Vieira	2	6^{4}
(United States) G Helgeson	6	4	6
LL	(United States) S Cacic	2	6	4
16	(Germany) V Martinek	6	6
(Canada) M Drake	2	1
(Czech Republic) P Langrová	6	7^{7}
Q	(United States) C Benjamin	2	6^{2}
WC	(Italy) L Ferrando	1	6	6^{2}
(South Africa) J Kruger	6	4	7^{7}

Second round
8	(Georgia (country)) L Meskhi	6	6
(United States) C Rubin	4	1
(Mexico) A Gavaldón	1	6	6
(United States) G Helgeson	6	3	4
16	(Germany) V Martinek	6^{2}	1
(Czech Republic) P Langrová	7^{7}	6
(South Africa) J Kruger	1	2
2	(Argentina) G Sabatini	6	6

Third round
8	(Georgia (country)) L Meskhi	6	6
(Mexico) A Gavaldón	4	0
(Czech Republic) P Langrová	0^{r}
2	(Argentina) G Sabatini	5

Quarterfinals
8	(Georgia (country)) L Meskhi	1	0
2	(Argentina) G Sabatini	6	6
