= 1994 Bausch & Lomb Championships =

- Date: April 4 – 10
- Edition: 15th
- Category: Tier II
- Draw: 56S / 24D
- Surface: Clay / outdoor
- Location: Amelia Island, Florida, U.S.
- Venue: Amelia Island Plantation

Champions

Singles
- (Spain) Arantxa Sánchez Vicario

Doubles
- (Spain) Arantxa Sánchez Vicario / (Latvia) Larisa Savchenko
| ← 1993 · | Amelia Island Championships | · 1995 → |

The 1994 Bausch & Lomb Championships was a women's tennis tournament played on outdoor clay courts at the Amelia Island Plantation on Amelia Island, Florida in the United States that was part of Tier II of the 1994 WTA Tour. It was the 15th edition of the tournament and was held from April 4 through April 10, 1994. First-seeded Arantxa Sánchez Vicario won her second consecutive singles title at the event.

== Finals ==
=== Singles ===
(Spain) Arantxa Sánchez Vicario defeated (Argentina) Gabriela Sabatini 6–1, 6–4

- It was Sánchez Vicario's 1st title of the year and the 13th of her career.

=== Doubles ===
(Spain) Arantxa Sánchez Vicario / (Latvia) Larisa Savchenko defeated (South Africa) Amanda Coetzer / (Argentina) Inés Gorrochategui 6–2, 6–7, 6–4

- It was Sánchez Vicario's 5th title of the year and the 43rd of her career. It was Savchenko's 3rd title of the year and the 48th of her career.
