= 1993 Bausch & Lomb Championships – Doubles =

Doubles
- 1993 Bausch & Lomb Championships

Final
- Champions: (Switzerland) Manuela Maleeva-Fragnière (Georgia (country)) Leila Meskhi
- Runners-up: (South Africa) Amanda Coetzer (Argentina) Inés Gorrochategui
- Score: 3–6, 6–3, 6–4

Details
- Draw: 28 (1WC/1Q)
- Seeds: 8

Events
Singles	Doubles
← 1992 ·	Amelia Island Championships	· 1994 →

Arantxa Sánchez Vicario and Natasha Zvereva were the defending champions, but lost in the quarterfinals to Manuela Maleeva-Fragnière and Leila Meskhi.

Maleeva-Fragnière and Meskhi won the title by defeating Amanda Coetzer and Inés Gorrochategui 3–6, 6–3, 6–4 in the final.

== Seeds ==
The first four seeds received a bye into the second round.

1. (Spain) Arantxa Sánchez Vicario / (Belarus) Natasha Zvereva (quarterfinals)
2. (Canada) Jill Hetherington / (United States) Kathy Rinaldi (quarterfinals)
3. (Netherlands) Manon Bollegraf / (United States) Lori McNeil (semifinals)
4. (Italy) Sandra Cecchini / (Argentina) Patricia Tarabini (semifinals)
5. (Czech Republic) Petra Langrová / (Argentina) Mercedes Paz (second round, withdrew)
6. (South Africa) Amanda Coetzer / (Argentina) Inés Gorrochategui (final)
7. (United States) Mary Lou Daniels / (South Africa) Rosalyn Fairbank-Nideffer (first round)
8. (Germany) Karin Kschwendt / (Argentina) Florencia Labat (first round)

== Draw ==
=== Key ===
- Q = Qualifier
- WC = Wild card
- LL = Lucky loser
- Alt = Alternate
- SE = Special exempt
- PR = Protected ranking
- ITF = ITF entry
- JE = Junior exempt
- w/o = Walkover
- r = Retired
- d = Defaulted
- SR = Special ranking

=== Finals ===
Semifinals
(Switzerland) Manuela Maleeva-Fragnière (Georgia (country)) Leila Meskhi	7^{7}	6
4	(Italy) Sandra Cecchini (Argentina) Patricia Tarabini	6^{4}	3
3	(Netherlands) Manon Bollegraf (United States) Lori McNeil	7^{7}	3	4
6	(South Africa) Amanda Coetzer (Argentina) Inés Gorrochategui	6^{4}	6	6

Final
(Switzerland) Manuela Maleeva-Fragnière (Georgia (country)) Leila Meskhi	3	6	6
6	(South Africa) Amanda Coetzer (Argentina) Inés Gorrochategui	6	3	4

=== Top half ===
First round
(Austria) P Ritter (France) N van Lottum	6	4	7
(Argentina) MJ Gaidano (Greece) C Papadáki	4	6	5
(Switzerland) M Maleeva-Fragnière (Georgia (country)) L Meskhi	6	6
Q	(Belarus) T Ignatieva (United States) R Jensen	0	4
(United States) B Bowes (United States) C Rubin	6	6
8	(Germany) K Kschwendt (Argentina) F Labat	3	2
(Brazil) L Tella (Brazil) A Vieira	2	4
(United States) J Emmons (United States) G Helgeson	6	6
(United States) M Ceniza (United States) J Watanabe	7^{7}	0	2
(United States) P O'Reilly (Netherlands) B Schultz	6^{2}	6	6
WC	(United States) Maureen Rankine (United States) Sylvia Schenck	0	1
5	(Czech Republic) P Langrová (Argentina) M Paz	6	6

Second round
1	(Spain) A Sánchez Vicario (Belarus) N Zvereva	6	6
(Austria) P Ritter (France) N van Lottum	1	2
(Switzerland) M Maleeva-Fragnière (Georgia (country)) L Meskhi	6	6
(United States) B Bowes (United States) C Rubin	2	3
4	(Italy) S Cecchini (Argentina) P Tarabini	6	7
(United States) J Emmons (United States) G Helgeson	2	5
(United States) P O'Reilly (Netherlands) B Schultz	w/o
5	(Czech Republic) P Langrová (Argentina) M Paz

Quarterfinals
1	(Spain) A Sánchez Vicario (Belarus) N Zvereva	4	1
(Switzerland) M Maleeva-Fragnière (Georgia (country)) L Meskhi	6	6
4	(Italy) S Cecchini (Argentina) P Tarabini	6	6
(United States) P O'Reilly (Netherlands) B Schultz	4	1

Semifinals
(Switzerland) M Maleeva-Fragnière (Georgia (country)) L Meskhi	7^{7}	6
4	(Italy) S Cecchini (Argentina) P Tarabini	6^{4}	3

=== Bottom half ===
First round
7	(United States) ML Daniels (South Africa) R Fairbank-Nideffer	5	1
(United States) S Stafford (Hungary) A Temesvári	7	6
(Canada) M Drake (United States) A Keller	7	6
(Czech Republic) R Bobková (France) A Fusai	5	4
(Bulgaria) L Bacheva (Germany) V Martinek	6	3	6^{6}
(United States) M Jackson-Nobrega (Netherlands) C Vis	2	6	7^{8}
6	(South Africa) A Coetzer (Argentina) I Gorrochategui	6	6
(Argentina) B Fulco-Villella (United States) T Whittington	3	2
(United States) L Davenport (Italy) L Golarsa	5	3
(United States) Ta Whitlinger (United States) Te Whitlinger	7	6
(South Africa) L Horn (South Africa) J Kruger	4	1
(United States) C Benjamin (United States) C Kuhlman	6	6

Second round
(United States) S Stafford (Hungary) A Temesvári	6	6
(Canada) M Drake (United States) A Keller	4	4
(United States) M Jackson-Nobrega (Netherlands) C Vis	4	4
3	(Netherlands) M Bollegraf (United States) L McNeil	6	6
6	(South Africa) A Coetzer (Argentina) I Gorrochategui	6	6
(United States) Ta Whitlinger (United States) Te Whitlinger	0	3
(United States) C Benjamin (United States) C Kuhlman	6	0	0
2	(Canada) J Hetherington (United States) K Rinaldi	3	6	6

Quarterfinals
(United States) S Stafford (Hungary) A Temesvári	6^{3}	4
3	(Netherlands) M Bollegraf (United States) L McNeil	7^{7}	6
6	(South Africa) A Coetzer (Argentina) I Gorrochategui	6	6
2	(Canada) J Hetherington (United States) K Rinaldi	2	1

Semifinals
3	(Netherlands) M Bollegraf (United States) L McNeil	7^{7}	3	4
6	(South Africa) A Coetzer (Argentina) I Gorrochategui	6^{4}	6	6
