= 1991 Bausch & Lomb Championships =

- Date: April 8 – 14
- Edition: 12th
- Category: Tier II
- Draw: 56S / 24D
- Prize money: $350,000
- Surface: Clay / outdoor
- Location: Amelia Island, Florida, U.S.
- Venue: Amelia Island Plantation

Champions

Singles
- (Argentina) Gabriela Sabatini

Doubles
- (Spain) Arantxa Sánchez Vicario (Czechoslovakia) Helena Suková
| ← 1990 · | Amelia Island Championships | · 1992 → |

The 1991 Bausch & Lomb Championships was a women's tennis tournament played on outdoor clay courts at the Amelia Island Plantation on Amelia Island, Florida in the United States. It was part of Tier II of the 1991 WTA Tour and marked the 12th edition of the tournament. The event took place from April 8 through April 14, 1991. Gabriela Sabatini emerged as the singles champion.

== Finals ==
=== Singles ===
(Argentina) Gabriela Sabatini defeated (Germany) Steffi Graf 7–5, 7–6^{(7–3)}

- It was Sabatini's 4th title of the year and the 19th of her career.

=== Doubles ===
(Spain) Arantxa Sánchez Vicario / (Czechoslovakia) Helena Suková defeated (Argentina) Mercedes Paz / (Soviet Union) Natasha Zvereva 4–6, 6–2, 6–2

- It was Sánchez Vicario's 2nd title of the year and the 7th of her career. It was Suková's 3rd title of the year and the 44th of her career.
