= 1994 Bausch & Lomb Championships – Singles =

Singles
- 1994 Bausch & Lomb Championships

Final
- Champion: (Spain) Arantxa Sánchez Vicario
- Runner-up: (Argentina) Gabriela Sabatini
- Score: 6–1, 6–4

Details
- Draw: 56 (8 Q / 3 WC )
- Seeds: 16

Events
Singles	Doubles
← 1993 ·	Amelia Island Championships	· 1995 →

Arantxa Sánchez Vicario was the defending champion and won in the final 6–1, 6–4 against Gabriela Sabatini.

== Seeds ==
A champion seed is indicated in bold text while text in italics indicates the round in which that seed was eliminated. The top eight seeds received a bye to the second round.

1. (Spain) **Arantxa Sánchez Vicario (champion)**
2. (Spain) Conchita Martínez (quarterfinals)
3. (United States) Martina Navratilova (semifinals)
4. (Argentina) Gabriela Sabatini (final)
5. (United States) Mary Joe Fernández (second round)
6. (United States) Lindsay Davenport (semifinals)
7. (France) Mary Pierce (quarterfinals)
8. (Bulgaria) Magdalena Maleeva (third round)
9. (South Africa) Amanda Coetzer (third round)
10. (Germany) Sabine Hack (quarterfinals)
11. (Netherlands) Brenda Schultz (first round)
12. (United States) Chanda Rubin (quarterfinals)
13. (Georgia (country)) Leila Meskhi (third round)
14. (United States) Ginger Helgeson (second round)
15. (Germany) Barbara Rittner (first round)
16. (Germany) Meike Babel (second round)

== Draw ==
=== Key ===
- Q = Qualifier
- WC = Wild card
- LL = Lucky loser
- Alt = Alternate
- SE = Special exempt
- PR = Protected ranking
- ITF = ITF entry
- JE = Junior exempt
- w/o = Walkover
- r = Retired
- d = Defaulted
- SR = Special ranking

=== Finals ===
Semifinals
1	(Spain) **Arantxa Sánchez Vicario**	**6**	**6**
3	(United States) Martina Navratilova	4	3
4	(Argentina) **Gabriela Sabatini**	**6**	**6**
6	(United States) Lindsay Davenport	2	4

Final
1	(Spain) **Arantxa Sánchez Vicario**	**6**	**6**
4	(Argentina) Gabriela Sabatini	1	4

=== Top half ===
==== Section 1 ====
First round
(Romania) **R Dragomir**	**6**	**6**
(Italy) S Farina	4	2
(Argentina) M-J Gaidano	2	3
(Belgium) **L Courtois**	**6**	**6**
WC	(Hungary) A Temesvári	5	1
14	(United States) **G Helgeson**	**7**	**6**
10	(Germany) **S Hack**	**7**	**6**
(Netherlands) K Boogert	5	2
(Argentina) **I Gorrochategui**	**6**	**6**
(Italy) F Bonsignori	0	3
(Argentina) P Tarabini	3	1
(Russia) **E Maniokova**	**6**	**6**

Second round
1	(Spain) **A Sánchez Vicario**	**6**	**6**
(Romania) R Dragomir	1	2
(Belgium) **L Courtois**	**6**	2	**6**
14	(United States) G Helgeson	2	**6**	2
10	(Germany) **S Hack**	4	**6**	**6**
(Argentina) I Gorrochategui	**6**	1	1
(Russia) E Maniokova	**7**	3	3
8	(Bulgaria) **M Maleeva**	6	**6**	**6**

Third round
1	(Spain) **A Sánchez Vicario**	**6**	**6**
(Belgium) L Courtois	0	2
10	(Germany) **S Hack**	**7**	**6**
8	(Bulgaria) M Maleeva	6	4

Quarterfinals
1	(Spain) **A Sánchez Vicario**	**6**	**6**
10	(Germany) S Hack	1	2

==== Section 2 ====
First round
LL	(Germany) **V Martinek**	**6**	**6**
(Mexico) A Gavaldón	1	1
(Germany) **S Frankl**	**6**	5	**6**
Q	(Germany) K Kschwendt	3	**7**	3
(United States) **K Rinaldi-Stunkel**	2	**6**	**6**
15	(Germany) B Rittner	**6**	0	3
12	(United States) **C Rubin**	**7**	1	**6**
(Italy) S Cecchini	6	**6**	3
Q	(United States) A Keller	0	4
(Switzerland) **E Zardo**	**6**	**6**
(Croatia) N Ercegović	3	**6**	3
Q	(Czech Republic) **P Langrová**	**6**	1	**6**

Second round
3	(United States) **M Navratilova**	**6**	**6**
LL	(Germany) V Martinek	1	1
(Germany) **S Frankl**	**6**	**6**
(United States) K Rinaldi-Stunkel	2	4
12	(United States) **C Rubin**	3	**7**	**6**
(Switzerland) E Zardo	**6**	5	2
Q	(Czech Republic) **P Langrová**	3	**6**	**6**
5	(United States) M J Fernández	**6**	4	2

Third round
3	(United States) **M Navratilova**	**6**	**6**
(Germany) S Frankl	1	1
12	(United States) **C Rubin**	4	**6**	**6**
Q	(Czech Republic) P Langrová	**6**	0	0

Quarterfinals
3	(United States) **M Navratilova**	**6**	**6**
12	(United States) C Rubin	3	2

=== Bottom half ===
==== Section 3 ====
First round
(Austria) S Dopfer	5	0
(Romania) **I Spîrlea**	**7**	**6**
LL	(Brazil) A Vieira	2	1
Q	(Sweden) **Å Carlsson**	**6**	**6**
Q	(South Africa) **J Kruger**	**6**	**6**
11	(Netherlands) B Schultz	1	2
9	(South Africa) **A Coetzer**	**6**	**6**
(France) A Fusai	4	2
(Latvia) **L Neiland**	**7**	**7**
(Germany) P Begerow	6	5
WC	(Argentina) B Fulco-Villella	2	4
(Slovakia) **J Husárová**	**6**	**6**

Second round
7	(France) **M Pierce**	**6**	**7**
(Romania) I Spîrlea	4	6
Q	(Sweden) **Å Carlsson**	**6**	**6**
Q	(South Africa) J Kruger	4	4
9	(South Africa) **A Coetzer**	**6**	**6**
(Latvia) L Neiland	2	2
(Slovakia) J Husárová	3	4
4	(Argentina) **G Sabatini**	**6**	**6**

Third round
7	(France) **M Pierce**	**6**	4	**6**
Q	(Sweden) Å Carlsson	2	**6**	2
9	(South Africa) A Coetzer	**6**	0	1
4	(Argentina) **G Sabatini**	4	**6**	**6**

Quarterfinals
7	(France) M Pierce	4	3
4	(Argentina) **G Sabatini**	**6**	**6**

==== Section 4 ====
First round
(Czech Republic) **R Bobková**	**6**	**6**
Q	(United States) J Watanabe	0	2
(Germany) C Singer	4	2
(Czech Republic) **K Kroupová**	**6**	**6**
WC	(Argentina) M Paz	4	3
16	(Germany) **M Babel**	**6**	**6**
13	(Georgia (country)) **L Meskhi**	**6**	**6**
Q	(United States) M Jackson-Nobrega	1	0
Q	(Argentina) **P Suárez**	**6**	**6**
(United States) L Raymond	4	2
(United States) C Kuhlman	1	0
LL	(Austria) **P Ritter**	**6**	**6**

Second round
6	(United States) **L Davenport**	**6**	**6**
(Czech Republic) R Bobková	3	0
(Czech Republic) **K Kroupová**	**7**	**6**
16	(Germany) M Babel	5	2
13	(Georgia (country)) **L Meskhi**	**7**	**6**
Q	(Argentina) P Suárez	5	0
LL	(Austria) P Ritter	1	2
2	(Spain) **C Martínez**	**6**	**6**

Third round
6	(United States) **L Davenport**	**6**	**6**
(Czech Republic) K Kroupová	2	1
13	(Georgia (country)) L Meskhi	2	3
2	(Spain) **C Martínez**	**6**	**6**

Quarterfinals
6	(United States) **L Davenport**	4	**6**	**7**
2	(Spain) C Martínez	**6**	4	6
