= 1994 Bausch & Lomb Championships – Doubles =

Doubles
- 1994 Bausch & Lomb Championships

Final
- Champions: (Latvia) Larisa Neiland; (Spain) Arantxa Sánchez Vicario
- Runners-up: (South Africa) Amanda Coetzer; (Argentina) Inés Gorrochategui
- Score: 6–2, 6–7, 6–4

Details
- Draw: 28 (1 Q / 2 WC )
- Seeds: 8

Events
Singles	Doubles
← 1993 ·	Amelia Island Championships	· 1995 →

Manuela Maleeva-Fragnière and Leila Meskhi were the defending champions. Maleeva-Fragnière retired from tennis earlier that year, but only Meskhi competed that year with Eugenia Maniokova.

Maniokova and Meskhi lost in the quarterfinals to Larisa Neiland and Arantxa Sánchez Vicario.

Neiland and Sánchez Vicario won in the final 6–2, 6–7, 6–4 against Amanda Coetzer and Inés Gorrochategui.

== Seeds ==
Champion seeds are indicated in bold text while text in italics indicates the round in which those seeds were eliminated. The top four seeded teams received byes into the second round.

1. (Latvia) **Larisa Neiland** / (Spain) **Arantxa Sánchez Vicario (champions)**
2. (United States) Mary Joe Fernández / (Spain) Conchita Martínez (quarterfinals)
3. (South Africa) Amanda Coetzer / (Argentina) Inés Gorrochategui (final)
4. (Italy) Sandra Cecchini / (Argentina) Patricia Tarabini (quarterfinals)
5. (United States) Lindsay Davenport / (United States) Lisa Raymond (semifinals)
6. (Canada) Jill Hetherington / (United States) Shaun Stafford (semifinals)
7. (France) Mary Pierce / (Hungary) Andrea Temesvári (first round)
8. (Germany) Barbara Rittner / (United States) Chanda Rubin (second round)

== Draw ==
=== Key ===
- Q = Qualifier
- WC = Wild card
- LL = Lucky loser
- Alt = Alternate
- SE = Special exempt
- PR = Protected ranking
- ITF = ITF entry
- JE = Junior exempt
- w/o = Walkover
- r = Retired
- d = Defaulted
- SR = Special ranking

=== Final ===
Final

1
- (Spain) **Arantxa Sánchez Vicario**
- (Latvia) **Larisa Savchenko**
**6**
6
**6**

3
- (South Africa) Amanda Coetzer
- (Argentina) Inés Gorrochategui
2
**7**
4

=== Top half ===
First round

Second round

Quarterfinals

Semifinals

1
- (Latvia) **L Neiland**
- (Spain) **A Sánchez Vicario**
**6**
**6**

- (Slovakia) **J Husárová**
- (Slovakia) **D Szabova**
**6**
**6**

- (Slovakia) J Husárová
- (Slovakia) D Szabova
1
1

- (Sweden) Å Carlsson
- (Belgium) L Courtois
3
4

1
- (Latvia) **L Neiland**
- (Spain) **A Sánchez Vicario**
**6**
**7**

- (Russia) **E Maniokova**
- (Georgia (country)) **L Meskhi**
**6**
**6**

- (Russia) E Maniokova
- (Georgia (country)) L Meskhi
2
5

- (United States) C MacGregor
- (United States) S McCarthy
4
1

- (Russia) **E Maniokova**
- (Georgia (country)) **L Meskhi**
**6**
**6**

Q
- (South Africa) L Horn
- (Czech Republic) L Lásková
4
**6**
6

8
- (Germany) B Rittner
- (United States) C Rubin
2
3

8
- (Germany) **B Rittner**
- (United States) **C Rubin**
**6**
4
**7**

1
- (Latvia) **L Neiland**
- (Spain) **A Sánchez Vicario**
**6**
**6**

6
- (Canada) J Hetherington
- (United States) S Stafford
2
3

4
- (Italy) **S Cecchini**
- (Argentina) **P Tarabini**
**6**
**6**

- (Argentina) **M Díaz Oliva**
- (Spain) **V Ruano-Pascual**
**6**
**6**

- (Argentina) M Díaz Oliva
- (Spain) V Ruano-Pascual
4
2

- (United States) E deLone
- (United States) A Keller
4
1

4
- (Italy) S Cecchini
- (Argentina) P Tarabini
**6**
6
6

- (United States) C Benjamin
- (United States) M Jackson-Nobrega
1
3

6
- (Canada) **J Hetherington**
- (United States) **S Stafford**
2
**7**
**7**

- (Czech Republic) **R Bobková**
- (Czech Republic) **P Langrová**
**6**
**6**

- (Czech Republic) R Bobková
- (Czech Republic) P Langrová
5
4

- (Netherlands) K Boogert
- (Germany) C Singer
4
6

6
- (Canada) **J Hetherington**
- (United States) **S Stafford**
**7**
**6**

6
- (Canada) **J Hetherington**
- (United States) **S Stafford**
**6**
**7**

=== Bottom half ===
First round

Second round

Quarterfinals

Semifinals

7
- (France) M Pierce
- (Hungary) A Temesvári
**6**
3
4

- (Germany) **M Babel**
- (Germany) **K Kschwendt**
0
**6**
**6**

- (Germany) M Babel
- (Germany) K Kschwendt
6
**6**
4

- (United States) **S Collins**
- (South Africa) **M de Swardt**
**6**
**6**

- (United States) **S Collins**
- (South Africa) **M de Swardt**
**7**
4
**6**

- (Austria) S Dopfer
- (Austria) P Ritter
1
3

- (United States) S Collins
- (South Africa) M de Swardt
4
**6**
2

WC
- (Germany) S Hack
- (United States) P O'Reilly
4
4

3
- (South Africa) **A Coetzer**
- (Argentina) **I Gorrochategui**
**6**
3
**6**

WC
- (United Kingdom) **J Moore**
- (United States) **V Sureephong**
**6**
**6**

WC
- (United Kingdom) J Moore
- (United States) V Sureephong
1
1

3
- (South Africa) **A Coetzer**
- (Argentina) **I Gorrochategui**
**6**
**6**

3
- (South Africa) **A Coetzer**
- (Argentina) **I Gorrochategui**
2
**6**
**6**

5
- (United States) **L Davenport**
- (United States) **L Raymond**
**6**
**6**

5
- (United States) L Davenport
- (United States) L Raymond
**6**
4
2

- (Romania) R Dragomir
- (Romania) I Spîrlea
3
4

5
- (United States) **L Davenport**
- (United States) **L Raymond**

- (Italy) **S Farina**
- (United States) **G Helgeson**
**6**
**6**

- (Italy) S Farina
- (United States) G Helgeson
d

- (Argentina) B Fulco-Villella
- (Slovakia) R Zrubáková
3
3

5
- (United States) **L Davenport**
- (United States) **L Raymond**
**6**
**6**

- (France) **A Fusai**
- (Poland) **M Mroz**
**6**
4
**6**

2
- (United States) M J Fernández
- (Spain) C Martínez
3
4

- (Canada) P Hy
- (Argentina) M Paz
2
**6**
4

- (France) A Fusai
- (Poland) M Mroz
2
2

2
- (United States) **M J Fernández**
- (Spain) **C Martínez**
**6**
**6**
