= 1990 Bausch & Lomb Championships =

Tennis tournament

- Date: April 9–15
- Edition: 11th
- Category: Tier II
- Draw: 56S / 24D
- Prize money: $350,000
- Surface: Clay / outdoor
- Location: Amelia Island, Florida, U.S.
- Venue: Amelia Island Plantation

Champions

Singles
- (Germany) Steffi Graf

Doubles
- (Argentina) Mercedes Paz (Spain) Arantxa Sánchez Vicario
← 1989 ·	Amelia Island Championships	· 1991 →

The 1990 Bausch & Lomb Championships was a women's tennis tournament played on outdoor clay courts at the Amelia Island Plantation on Amelia Island, Florida in the United States that was part of Tier II of the 1990 WTA Tour. It was the 11th edition of the tournament and was held from April 9 through April 15, 1990. First-seeded Steffi Graf won the singles title.

== Finals ==
=== Singles ===
(Germany) Steffi Graf defeated (Spain) Arantxa Sánchez Vicario 6–1, 6–0

- It was Graf's 3rd singles title of the year and the 47th of her career.

=== Doubles ===
(Argentina) Mercedes Paz / (Spain) Arantxa Sánchez Vicario defeated (Czechoslovakia) Regina Rajchrtová / (Hungary) Andrea Temesvári 7–6^{(7–5)}, 6–4

- It was Paz' 1st title of the year and the 16th of her career. It was Sánchez Vicario's 2nd title of the year and the 3rd of her career.
