= 1992 Bausch & Lomb Championships =

- Date: April 6–12
- Edition: 13th
- Category: Tier II
- Draw: 56S / 24D
- Prize money: $350,000
- Surface: Clay / outdoor
- Location: Amelia Island, Florida, U.S.
- Venue: Amelia Island Plantation

Champions

Singles
- (Argentina) Gabriela Sabatini

Doubles
- (Spain) Arantxa Sánchez Vicario (Commonwealth of Independent States) Natasha Zvereva
← 1991 ·	Amelia Island Championships	· 1993 →

The 1992 Bausch & Lomb Championships was a women's tennis tournament played on outdoor clay courts at the Amelia Island Plantation on Amelia Island, Florida in the United States that was part of Tier II of the 1992 WTA Tour. It was the 13th edition of the tournament and was held from April 6 through April 12, 1992. Second-seeded Gabriela Sabatini won the singles title and earned $70,000 first-prize money.

== Finals ==
=== Singles ===
(Argentina) Gabriela Sabatini defeated (Germany) Steffi Graf 6–2, 1–6, 6–3

- It was Sabatini's 4th title of the year and the 24th of her career.

=== Doubles ===
(Spain) Arantxa Sánchez Vicario / (Commonwealth of Independent States) Natasha Zvereva defeated (United States) Zina Garrison / (Czechoslovakia) Jana Novotná 6–1, 6–0

- It was Sánchez Vicario's 6th title of the year and the 14th of her career. It was Zvereva's 3rd title of the year and the 22nd of her career.
