= Gabriela Sabatini =

Argentine tennis player (born 1970)

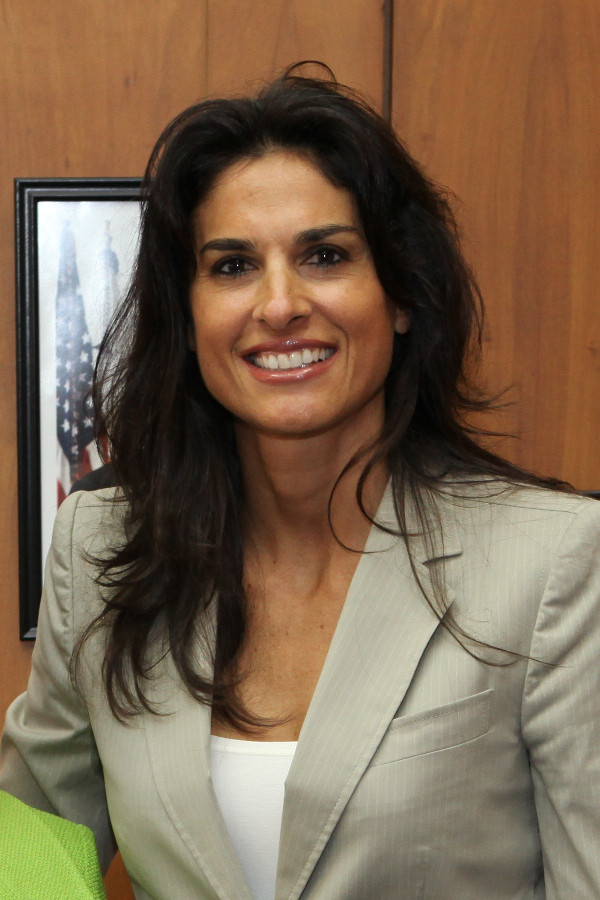
- Sabatini at the US Embassy in Buenos Aires, January 2012
- Full name: Gabriela Beatriz Sabatini
- Country (sports): Argentina
- Residence: Buenos Aires, Argentina; Boca Raton, Florida, U.S.
- Born: 16 May 1970 (age 56) Buenos Aires, Argentina
- Height: 1.75 m (5 ft 9 in)
- Turned pro: 1982
- Retired: 1996
- Plays: Right-handed (one-handed backhand)
- Prize money: $8,785,850
- Int. Tennis HoF: 2006 (member page)

Singles
- Career record: 632–189
- Career titles: 27
- Highest ranking: No. 3 (27 February 1989)

Grand Slam singles results
- Australian Open: SF (1989, 1992, 1993, 1994)
- French Open: SF (1985, 1987, 1988, 1991, 1992)
- Wimbledon: F (1991)
- US Open: W (1990)

Other tournaments
- Tour Finals: W (1988, 1994)
- Olympic Games: F (1988)

Doubles
- Career record: 252–96
- Career titles: 14
- Highest ranking: No. 3 (6 November 1988)

Grand Slam doubles results
- Australian Open: SF (1989)
- French Open: F (1986, 1987, 1989)
- Wimbledon: W (1988)
- US Open: SF (1986, 1987, 1988, 1989, 1994, 1996)
Medal record
Women's tennis
Representing Argentina
Olympic Games
Silver medal – second place	1988 Seoul	Singles

Gabriela Beatriz Sabatini (Spanish pronunciation: [gaˈβɾjela βeaˈtɾis saβaˈtini]; born 16 May 1970) is an Argentine former professional tennis player. A former world No. 3 in both singles and doubles, Sabatini was one of the leading players from the mid-1980s to the mid-1990s, amassing 41 titles across both disciplines.

In singles, Sabatini won the 1990 US Open, the WTA Finals in 1988 and 1994, and was runner-up at Wimbledon 1991, the 1988 US Open, and the silver medalist at the 1988 Olympics. In doubles, she won Wimbledon in 1988 partnering with Steffi Graf, and reached three French Open finals. Among Open Era players who did not reach the world No. 1 ranking, Sabatini has the most wins over reigning No. 1 players. In 2006, she was inducted into the International Tennis Hall of Fame, and in 2018, Tennis Magazine ranked her as the 20th-greatest female player of the preceding 50 years.

== Childhood and junior career ==
Sabatini was born 16 May 1970 in Buenos Aires, Argentina, to Osvaldo and Beatriz Garofalo Sabatini. Her father was an executive in General Motors. Her elder brother, Osvaldo, is an actor and producer.

Sabatini started playing tennis at the age of six, and won her first tournament at eight. In 1983, age 13, she became the youngest player ever to win the Orange Bowl in Miami, Florida. She won the girls' singles at the 1984 French Open and the US Open girls' doubles with fellow Argentinian Mercedes Paz. Sabatini reached world No. 1 in the junior rankings that year and was named 1984 Junior World Champion by the International Tennis Federation.

Sabatini stated that she deliberately lost matches in her youth to avoid having to do on-court interviews and therefore avoid media attention. She said that her shyness had been a major problem, and she thought she had to speak on-court after playing in the final of a tournament; so, she would lose in the semifinals.

== Career ==
=== Early years ===
In 1985, aged 15 years and three weeks, Sabatini became one of the youngest-ever players to reach the semifinals of the French Open, where she lost to Chris Evert. She won her first WTA Tour singles title later that year in Tokyo. She first entered the world's top ten (at #10) in September 1985, and ended the year ranked number 12. She received the WTA Newcomer of the Year award.

Sabatini reached the semifinals of Wimbledon in 1986, losing to Martina Navratilova, before winning her second WTA title in Buenos Aires, She re-entered the world's top ten in September 1986 and would remain there for 508 consecutive weeks until May 1996.

Sabatini reached the semifinals of the 1987 French Open, and reached the final of the 1987 WTA Tour Championships, losing to Steffi Graf both times. She also won three WTA titles, including defeating world No. 4, Pam Shriver in Brighton.

=== 1988: US Open and Olympics finals; WTA Finals champion ===
In February 1988, Sabatini entered the top five in rankings, and would remain there uninterrupted until August 1993. Having reached her third French Open semifinal, she then reached her first Grand Slam singles final at the US Open, where she lost to Graf in three sets. Sabatini represented Argentina in the 1988 Summer Olympics held in Seoul and was selected to carry her country's flag in the opening ceremony. She went on to win the silver medal in the women's singles competition, losing to Graf in the final. Sabatini teamed-up with Graf to win the women's doubles title at Wimbledon that year. At the end of 1988, Sabatini won her first WTA Tour Championships, without dropping a set.

=== 1989 ===
In 1989, Sabatini reached seven tournament finals and won four titles, including the Miami Open (defeating Evert in the final). In defeating world No. 2, Martina Navratilova, and No. 1, Steffi Graf, to obtain the Amelia Island title, she became only the fifth player in Open Era history to defeat both the No. 1 and 2 ranked players at the same tournament. She also reached the semifinals of the Australian Open and US Open Grand Slam tournaments.

=== 1990: US Open champion ===
At the Australian Open, Sabatini sprained her ankle during a third-round match while one set up, and had to be taken off Centre Court in a wheelchair. 80 minutes later, in the following match, Mark Woodforde also sprained his ankle on the same court and was forced to retire by wheelchair too. Multiple players had complained of the dangers of playing on the Rebound Ace hard court surface used at the tournament, which they claimed became very sticky – and therefore potentially dangerous – in very hot conditions. Sabatini was sidelined for six weeks by the injury, returning to the tour in mid-March and winning her first tournament back – the Virginia Slims of Florida – without the loss of a set.

She reached the semi-finals of Wimbledon, losing to eventual champion Martina Navratilova, in straight sets.

At the US Open, Sabatini progressed to her second Grand Slam final where she defeated world No. 1 Graf in straight sets 6–2, 7–6 to win the title, having saved two set points against her while 5-6 down in the second set. She credited her win with being more aggressive and coming to the net whenever she could to attack Graf's shorter balls. Sabatini also beat Graf in the semifinals of the WTA Championships in Madison Square Garden later that year, losing in the final to Monica Seles, 6–4, 5–7, 3–6, 6–4, 6–2. It was the first five-set match to be played on the women's tour since 1901.

=== 1991: Wimbledon final ===
Sabatini won five tournaments in the first half of the year. She beat three top five players (Graf, Navratilova and Fernandez) on her way to winning the title in Tokyo, and beat Graf on three further occasions in Boca Raton, Key Biscayne and Amelia Island. In the Italian Open final, Sabatini defeated world no. 1 Seles for the loss of just five games. She reached the semifinals at Roland Garros (saving two match points in defeating Jana Novotná in the quarter-finals) and then her third Grand Slam singles final at Wimbledon, where she lost to Graf 4–6, 6–3, 6–8 (having served for the match twice). Sabatini came close to attaining the world No. 1 ranking in 1991, but was narrowly denied by Graf and then Monica Seles. All three players' rankings were within a few points of each other for much of the year. Her year was capped by receiving the WTA Most Improved Player of the Year award.

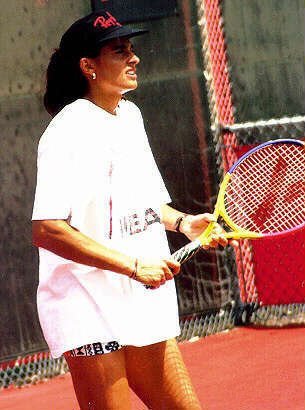
Sabatini practicing in the early 1990s

=== 1992 ===
Sabatini reached eight finals and won five titles, including her fourth Italian Open (where she beat world No. 1 Seles in the final again), Amelia Island (defeating Graf in the final) and Hilton Head. She also reached the semifinal stage at three of the four grand slams: the Australian Open, French Open and Wimbledon; and a quarterfinal at the US Open.

=== 1993 ===
At the Australian Open, Sabatini reached the semifinals, saving three match points in the quarterfinals against Mary Pierce to defeat her 4–6, 7–6, 6–0, before losing to eventual champion, Seles. She reached consecutive finals at the Italian Open and German Open during the clay-court season. At the French Open in June, Sabatini lost to Mary Jo Fernandez in the quarterfinals 8–10 in the final set, in what was – at the time – the third longest match in Open Era tennis, having led 5–1 in the second set. Sabatini also reached the quarterfinals at Wimbledon, and at the US Open where she lost to Graf in three sets.

That year in May, following the stabbing attack of Monica Seles in the WTA Hamburg tournament, a vote among the top players was held by the tour organisers to decide whether Seles should be allowed to have her world no. 1 ranking protected while recovering from the knife attack. Of the 17 players voting, all players voted against protecting Seles' ranking, apart from Sabatini (who abstained). Despite the vote result, Seles was eventually granted a joint No. 1 ranking (with Graf) upon her return to the tour two years later.

=== 1994: WTA Finals champion ===
In 1994, Sabatini reached the finals of Amelia Island and Strasbourg, and the semifinals of both the Australian Open and US Open. Across 15 consecutive Grand Slam events from Wimbledon 1990 to Australian Open 1994, she did not lose before the quarterfinal stage; this was the 4th longest streak of consecutive quarterfinal Grand Slam appearances in women's tennis ever (behind Graf and Navratilova tied on 19, and Chris Evert with 32 straight.) In November, Sabatini defeated Lindsay Davenport in the final of the WTA Championships in New York to win her second title at that tournament. In the first round, she beat world No. 6, Martina Navratilova, in what was Navratilova's last match before retirement.

=== 1995 ===
Sabatini won the title at the Sydney International, defeating Davenport in the final in straight sets. As well as the reaching a record seventh final in the Amelia Island Championships and her third final at the Porsche Tennis Grand Prix, she also reached the quarterfinals of both the French Open and Wimbledon, and the semifinals of the US Open (where she lost to eventual champion Graf 4–6, 6–7). Their semifinal was the 40th and final match between the pair, in which Graf led 29–11. Sabatini's 11 wins meant she had defeated Graf more times than any other player ever managed to defeat her.

=== 1996: injury and retirement ===
Sabatini missed several months of the season due to a pulled stomach muscle injury. In New York in October, she announced her retirement from professional tennis. At the end of the year, she received the WTA Diamond Aces Award (given to the player considered to have done the most to promote tennis both on and off the court).

From 1986 until her five-month injury absence in 1996, Sabatini spent 508 consecutive weeks within the world's top 10. This remains the fourth longest top-10 streak among any player in WTA-tour history. She spent 312 of those weeks in the world's top five, and finished six consecutive seasons with a top-5 ranking. Sabatini reached the semifinal stage or better in Grand Slam championships on 18 occasions in singles and 14 times in doubles, and reached at least one Grand Slam singles semifinal for 11 consecutive years. She defeated the reigning world No. 1 on ten occasions (Graf seven times, Seles twice and Navratilova once) during her career.

Sabatini won the Diamond Konex Award in 2000 as the most distinguished "Sportsperson of the Decade" in Argentina, and in July 2006 she was inducted into the International Tennis Hall of Fame.

== Personal life ==
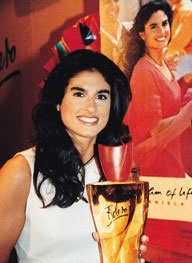
Sabatini with her perfume in 2006

In the late 1980s, Sabatini launched a line of fragrances after partnering with the German perfume company Mülhens (4711). Her signature scent debuted in 1989. Since retiring, she has continued to promote her lines of perfumes.

In 1992, Sabatini became the first ever tennis player to have a rose named after her, an orange-red bloom.

Great American Doll Company created a doll in Sabatini's likeness in 1994, dressed in tennis attire. That same year, Sabatini published a motivational book entitled My Story.

In 2003, she obtained Italian citizenship "jus sanguinis" through her paternal great-grandfather, David Sabatini, who was born in Potenza Picena in Central Italy, and immigrated to Argentina at the end of the 19th century with his wife Rosa Vivani.

A statue of Sabatini was unveiled in central Buenos Aires by Mauricio Macri in 2014. Within weeks of its unveiling, however, the bronze-coloured racket was stolen from the statue's grip. The statue is placed alongside memorials to other Argentinian sports stars including Lionel Messi, Diego Maradona, Guillermo Vilas and Roberto de Vicenzo.

Sabatini was awarded the International Club's prestigious Jean Borotra Sportsmanship Award in 2017 in recognition of both the sportsmanship she demonstrated throughout her career, and for her charitable projects post-retirement. She received the award from Rod Laver at the 2018 Wimbledon Championships.

In 2019, the ITF presented Sabatini with its highest accolade, the Philippe Chatrier Award, for her achievements both during her tennis career and post-retirement charity work, specifically her work involving UNICEF, UNESCO, the Special Olympics, and as an 'Athlete Role Model' at the 2018 Youth Olympic Games.

Sabatini resides in Buenos Aires, Boca Raton (Florida) and Pfäffikon in Switzerland.

== Grand Slam performance timelines ==
Key
W	F	SF	QF	#R	RR	Q#	DNQ	A	NH

(W) winner; (F) finalist; (SF) semifinalist; (QF) quarterfinalist; (#R) rounds 4, 3, 2, 1; (RR) round-robin stage; (Q#) qualification round; (DNQ) did not qualify; (A) absent; (NH) not held; (SR) strike rate (events won / competed); (W–L) win–loss record.

=== Singles ===
Tournament	1984	1985	1986	1987	1988	1989	1990	1991	1992	1993	1994	1995	1996	SR	W–L
Australian Open	A	A	NH	A	A	SF	3R	QF	SF	SF	SF	1R	4R	0 / 8	29–8
French Open	A	SF	4R	SF	SF	4R	4R	SF	SF	QF	1R	QF	A	0 / 11	42–11
Wimbledon	A	3R	SF	QF	4R	2R	SF	F	SF	QF	4R	QF	A	0 / 11	42–11
US Open	3R	1R	4R	QF	F	SF	W	QF	QF	QF	SF	SF	3R	1 / 13	51–12
Win–loss	2–1	7–3	11–3	13–3	14–3	14–4	17–3	19–4	19–4	17–4	13–4	13–4	5–2	1 / 43	164–42
Year-end ranking	74	12	9	6	4	3	5	3	3	5	7	7	56		

=== Doubles ===
Tournament	1984	1985	1986	1987	1988	1989	1990	1991	1992	1993	1994	1995	1996	Career SR
Australian Open	A	A	NH	A	A	SF	2R	3R	A	A	A	2R	QF	0 / 5
French Open	A	1R	F	F	SF	F	A	SF	A	A	3R	3R	A	0 / 8
Wimbledon	A	2R	A	3R	W	QF	QF	A	A	A	1R	SF	A	1 / 7
US Open	A	1R	SF	SF	SF	SF	3R	A	A	A	SF	2R	SF	0 / 9
Grand Slam SR	0 / 0	0 / 3	0 / 2	0 / 3	1 / 3	0 / 4	0 / 3	0 / 2	0 / 0	0 / 0	0 / 3	0 / 4	0 / 2	1 / 29
Year-end ranking	128	54	9	5	3	19	29	55	NR	NR	14	13	NR	

== See also ==
- Open Era tennis records – women's singles
- Graf–Sabatini rivalry
- Tweener (tennis)
- List of rose cultivars named after people

Awards
Preceded by (Argentina) Diego Maradona	Olimpia de Oro; 1987–1988	Succeeded by (Argentina) Eduardo Romero
Olympic Games
Preceded by Ricardo Ibarra	Flagbearer for Argentina; Seoul 1988	Succeeded by Marcelo Garraffo
Sporting positions
Preceded by (United States) Debbie Spence	Orange Bowl Girls' Singles Champion; Category: 18 and under 1984	Succeeded by (United States) Mary Joe Fernández
